= Flevo Festival =

Christian music festival in the Netherlands

Coordinates: 52°12′11″N 6°5′50″E

The Flevo Festival was an open air Christian music festival held each August in the Netherlands. The festival was first organized as the Kamperland Festival in 1978 by the Dutch arm of Youth for Christ and became a private foundation in 2002. The last event was held in 2012; one month later, the organization decided to stop gatherings because the quantity of visitors was decreasing: For example, in 2012 the number of people attending the festival was 6,000, whereas in 2011 that number was 9,500 people.

In its heyday, the festival attracted approximately 10,000 to 20,000 people each year. It highlighted all musical styles, but especially rock, and was considered by some to be the most important European Christian festival. Previous headline bands have included Stryper, dc Talk, Jars of Clay, Sixpence None the Richer, Bride, Audio Adrenaline, SONICFLOOd, Switchfoot and Five Iron Frenzy.

== Main Stage Performances (period from 1991) ==
Year	Thursday	Friday	Saturday	Sunday
1991	Split Level; P.I.D. Leon Patillo; Allies; Stryper	Brighton; Susan Ashton; The Throes; DeGarmo & Key; Julie Miller; Kenny Marks	In The Silence; Steve Grace; P.I.D. Steven Curtis Chapman; BeBe & CeCe Winans; Darrell Mansfield	
1992	Changed; John Johnson; Meekness; Wes King; The Violet Burning; Adrian Snell	Ben Okafor; Novella; Dan H Lost Dogs; Going Classic	Rick Elias; Acappella; XT; Over the Rhine; Billy & Sarah Gaines; Margaret Becker; Oslo Gospel Choir	
1993	Eden Burning; Perry & The Poor Boys; Novella; Over the Rhine; Legend; Blood Brothers	Kevin Prosch; Undercover; Vince Ebo; Keith Brown; The 77s The Five Blind Boys of Alabama	The Prayer Chain; Anointed; Ralph van Manen; Iona; Martyn Joseph; Guardian; Bryan Duncan	
1994	Schulze; Sixpence None The Richer; Greg & Rebecca Sparks; Ashley Cleveland; Whitecross; Blues Jam (with Darrell Mansfield, Trace Balin, Julie Miller)	The Electrics; Pam Thum; Steve Taylor; Jerusalem; Julie Miller	Buddy Miller; Phil Keaggy; Newsboys; The World Wide Message Tribe; Nina Åström; Whiteheart	
1995	Millennium; No Buts; Randy Stonehill; 65 dBA; Sunday's Child; Chris Lizotte; Jessy Dixon & Chicago Community Choir	Cauzin' Efekt; Blessed Rain; Imagine This; Bride; Quick and the Dead; Margaret Becker; One Hundred Days	Limit X Third Day; Schulze; Eric Champion; The Prayer Chain; Over the Rhine; The World Wide Message Tribe	
1996	Why? Sixpence None The Richer; Grits; 65 dBA; Perry & The Poor Boys; Mike Roe	Split Level; Carolyn Arends; Quick and the Dead; Ralph van Manen; MIC	Tourniquet; Johnny Q. Public; Iona; Dance Experience (The World Wide Message Tribe, Cameron Dante, HOG, and others)	
1997	Die Päpste; Tess Wiley; Whitecross; David Fitzgerald; MIC	Why? No Buts; Raze; Vigilantes of Love; Jerusalem	Dime Store Prophets; Switchfoot; Sarah Masen; Charlie Peacock; Over the Rhine; All Star United	
1998	David & Carrie Grant; The Echoing Green; Darrell Mansfield; Beam; The Gospel Project; Audio Adrenaline	Halcyon Days; Three Crosses; Ralph van Manen; Raze; Delirious?	The Electrics; Stavesacre; Five Iron Frenzy; JC Culture; All Star United; Larry Norman & Beam	
1999	Fono; The Potboilers; Kryptonite Garden; Stir; Three Crosses; MIC	W4C; Pete Stewart & Michael Tait; Split Level; Normal Generation? Salt; Sonicflood	Smalltown Poets; Vigilantes of Love; The O.C. Supertones; Out of Eden; Lucky; Burlap To Cashmere	
2000	Eminent Child; Skypark; Phat Fish; ReLand; Kate Miner; Steve Scott; Plumb	Rick Altizer; Normal Generation? Monk; A Ragamuffin Band; Glorybox; Kendall Payne; Luna Halo	KJ-52; Soapbox; John Reuben; Jennifer Knapp; The Violet Burning; The World Wide Message Tribe	
2001	Circadian Rhythm; Benjamin Gate; Jacob's Hip; MIC; Beam; Eminent Child	The Spirit That Guides Us; Cush; Kendall Payne; Switchfoot; Whisper Loud; Tourniquet; Bebo Norman; Luna Halo	Capewalk; Salvation Street; LaRue; Jeni Varnedeau; Shine; Earthsuit; The Violet Burning	
2002	Rodney Cordner and Jean-Pierre Rudolph dBA; Blaise; Superchick; Paige; Newsboys	Ceilli Rain; Zober; The Spirit That Guides Us; Steve; Earthsuit	Thebandwithnoname; Yfriday; Selfmindead; Gospel Boulevard; Over the Rhine; Kevin Max	
2003	Christafari; Cathy Burton; Extol; Verbs; East West	Blackstrap; Satellite 7 MIC; Jewels; The Prayer Chain; All Star United	SixStarHotel; Superhero; Trin-i-tee 5:7; Andy Hunter; Audio Adrenaline	
2004	Seeker's Planet; By The Tree; BarlowGirl; Rock 'n' Roll Worship Circus; The Spirit That Guides Us	Seventh Avenue; This Beautiful Mess; LA Symphony; Plumb; Andy Hunter	Rescate; The Electrics; Out of Eden; The Violet Burning; Jars of Clay	
2005	Beggars Fortune; Campsite; Seeker's Planet; John Davis; The Electrics	Onehundredhours; Narnia; Mars Ill; Superchick; Rock 'n' Roll Worship Circus (The Listening)	Zundapp; Day of Fire; 4th Avenue Jones; Rivertribe; Newsboys	
2006	TheBandwithnoname; Superhero; Blindside	Matt Redman; Verra Cruz; Family Force 5 All Star United; Andy Hunter	Kees Kraayenoord; TBC; DJ Maj; The Violet Burning; Luna Halo	
2007	Disciple; Rebecca St. James; Michael W. Smith	Hillsong London; Christafari; This Beautiful Republic; Sarah Kelly; Chris Tomlin	Kees Kraayenoord & friends – 30 jaar Flevo; The Gentlemen; The Listening; Over the Rhine; Newsboys	
2008	Make up Your Mind; Starfield; The Elms; Project 86; Sixpence None the Richer	Tim Hughes; Fireflight; Stellar Kart; Tourniquet; Salvador	Sarah Kelly; Ruth; Flatfoot 56; The Gentlemen; MxPx	
2009	The Dazzled Prophet; Thousand Foot Krutch; Rebecca St. James; Neal Morse; Salvador	Bluetree; Addison Road; Octoberlight feat. MOJO (Supertones); Fee; HB; Family Force 5	Parachute Band; Flatfoot 56; Philmont; Seabird; NewWorldSon; Newsboys; Superhero	
2010	Coen van den Heuvel; Children 18:3; Remedy Drive; The Listening; NewWorldSon	Rend Collective Experiment; Reilly; House of Heroes; The Gentlemen; People Get Ready; Stellar Kart	Pieter Daniel; Kutless; Trinity; The Afters; Anberlin; Leeland	
2011	Good Weather Forecast; Brian 'Head' Welch; Paper Route; Starfield	Gungor; Handsome Poets; Tenth Avenue North; Rapture Ruckus; Seabird; HB	The Convocation ft. Gospelflavor; Nikki; Run Kid Run; Abandon; LZ7; Red	
2012	Andy Hunter; Newworldson	InSalvation; The RED17; Mike Mains & The Branches; The Almost; Lights; Newworldson	Trinity; Humming People; Icon For Hire; Hawk Nelson; Gungor; Family Force 5	André van Zyl; Kees Kraayenoord; Parachute Band
