= Gomer (disambiguation) =

Gomer was the son of Japheth in the Hebrew Bible.

Gomer may also refer to:

== Places ==
- Gomer, Armenia, a town
- Gomer, Pyrénées-Atlantiques, France, a commune
- Gomer, Ohio, U.S., an unincorporated community
- Gomer Township, Caldwell County, Missouri, U.S.
- Fort Gomer, a former fort in Gosport, England

== Arts and entertainment ==
- Gomer Pyle, a fictional character from the American TV sitcoms The Andy Griffith Show and Gomer Pyle, U.S.M.C.
- The Gomers, an American rock band

== People ==
- Gomer (name), a list of people with the given name or surname
- Gomer (wife of Hosea), from the Hebrew Bible
- Harold Gomer Hodge (1944–2007), American Major League Baseball player and minor league manager and instructor
- Joseph Harris (Gomer) (1773–1825), Welsh minister, author and publisher known by the pseudonym "Gomer"

== Other uses ==
- "Get Out of My Emergency Room" (GOMER), a medical abbreviation for a patient in the emergency room who does not require emergency care
- French frigate Gomer (1841)
- Gomer Press, a printing and publishing company in Wales
- Gomer (animal), a male livestock animal whose penis has been surgically altered to prevent sexual intercourse

== See also ==
- Gomera (disambiguation)
- Gomér
