= LZ7 =

English Christian electronic dance music group

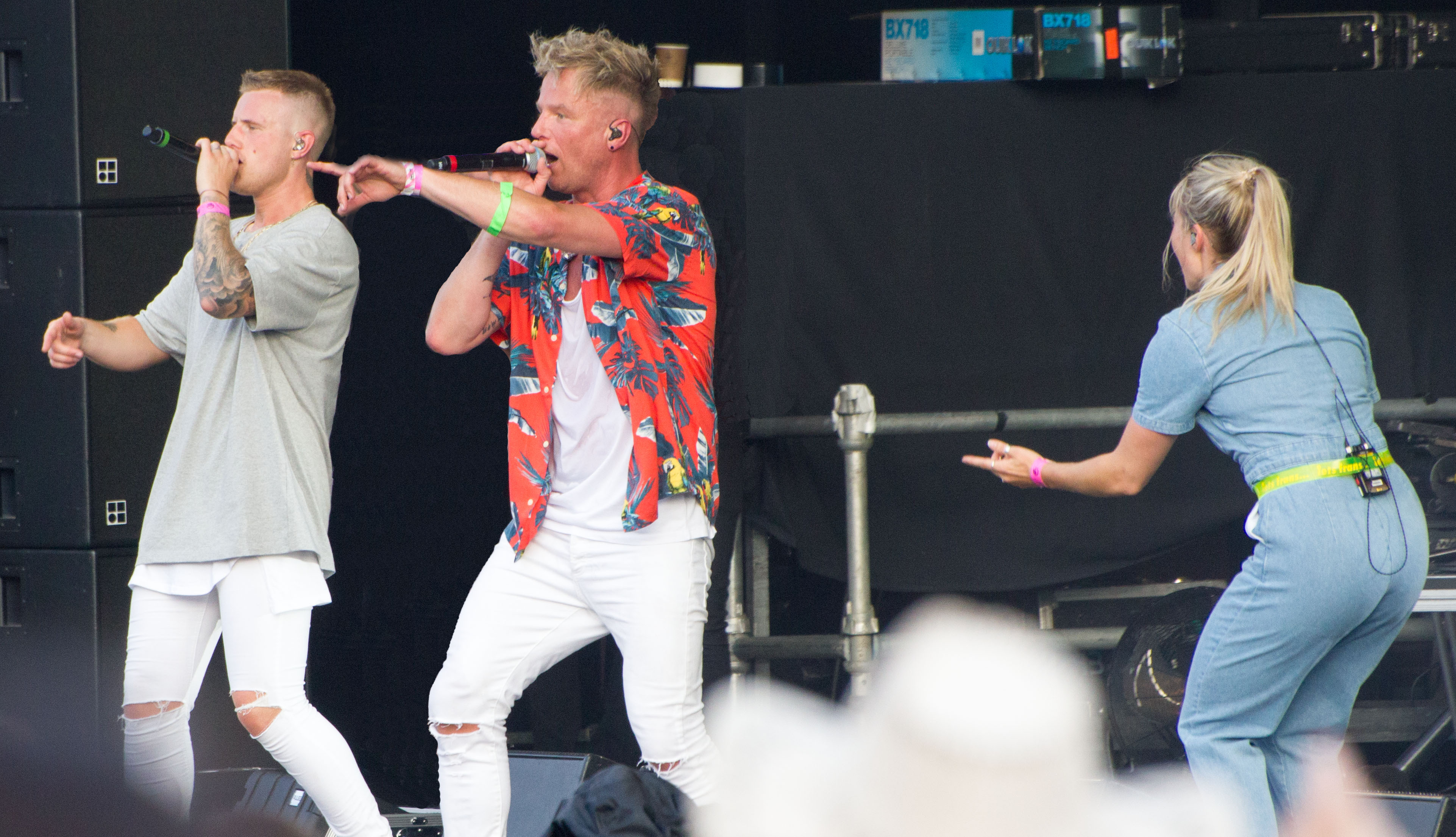
- Members of LZ7 performing in May 2019

Background information
- Origin: Manchester, United Kingdom
- Genres: Contemporary Christian, CEDM
- Years active: 2005–present
- Labels: Kingsway, Fierce!, LIGHT
- Members: Lindz West; Mary Kate Matthews; Danny Stephenson; Lee Matthews; Roo Walker; Leonn Meade; Louis Read
- Past members: Lily Jo; Ryan Sullivan; Adam Brown; Jorge Mhondera; J Marie Cooper; Jack Hobbs; Nana Ntiamoah; Nic Scholey; Ben Smith; Lucy West; Nathan Cross; Harrison Jupp
- Website: lz7.co.uk

LZ7 are an English Christian electronic dance music group from Manchester. The band was formed in 2005 by Lindz West, a member of dance band The Tribe, who had split up the previous year. LZ7 worked for many years as a part of the Christian charity The Message Trust, working with tens of thousands of teenagers each year in schools across Greater Manchester, Maidenhead and Reading. In 2012 LZ7 moved on from being part of the Message Trust and moved under the banner of independent charitable organisation "Light". The group is fronted by West who is the band's lead singer and rapper. In recent years LZ7 have moved into more mainstream areas, collaborating with artists such as Silentó and supporting Jason Derulo on his '2 Sides World Tour'.

== History ==
Lindz West, LZ7's frontman, had been a member of Manchester-based dance band The Tribe for three years from 2001. The Tribe's main focus was working with young people in high schools across Greater Manchester as part of youth charity The Message Trust, but they had also received acclaim as recording artists, winning three GMA Dove Awards.

After The Tribe disbanded in 2004, West originally intended to work with thebandwithnoname, but instead chose to create his own band, and formed LZ7 the following year, also under the banner of The Message Trust. LZ7 performed in school assemblies during 2005, and, alongside this work, played outdoor events over the summer, including Live Audacious, Grapevine and Merseyfest. Their debut album, Ruckus, was launched on 11 December 2005, before being officially released through Survivor Records on New Year's Eve.

"Cross I Carry"
LZ7's track "Cross I Carry", taken from Ruckus, featured West rapping and vocals from pop group BlushUK.

In 2006, LZ7 contributed to two Christian youth resources with members of BlushUK and Andy Hawthorne, founder of The Message Trust. These were a DVD named Deep and an album called Start Something. Deep won a Gold Award at the Christian Broadcast Council Annual Media Awards in 2006 for Best Factual DVD. LZ7 continued to perform through 2007, playing alongside thebandwithnoname and tbc at eight dates of the 2007 Hope Revolution tour and working with the Luis Palau Evangelical Association, leading a group of Arab Christians in Cairo with a performance of their track "Cross I Carry".

During 2008, LZ7 released Gasoline, a new EP that featured an early version of "This Little Light". The band continued to work in schools across Greater Manchester and perform at festivals in the UK and around the world, such as at Centre for Life in Newcastle upon Tyne. In early 2010, Lindz West featured on "Somebody Please", a single released by contemporary Christian artists to benefit victims of the 2010 Haiti earthquake. LZ7's personnel changed its lineup in 2010, ahead of their summer tour, which included dates at The Big Church Day Out, The Ultimate Event and Creation Fest.

In October, LZ7 had their first chart hit, when their single "This Little Light" made No. 26 on the UK Singles Chart and No. 4 on the UK Indie Chart. The song was originally featured on the Gasoline mini-album, but was remixed for single release and for inclusion on their 2010 album, Light. The song was the theme song for both the UK government's Shine Week 2009 and The Message Trust's own Shine Your Light campaign in 2010.

From the release of their new album and single, LZ7 went on 'The Light Tour', which saw them perform across the UK and further afield. Many of the gigs were end-of-week shows topping off evangelistic schools weeks. The lineup for this tour, were the members who featured on the album, West continuing as lead singer, drummer Rob Evans, Singer-dancer Nana Ntiamoah and Nic Scholey, formerly with BlushUK.

Since the release of Light in 2010, LZ7 have gone on to release a single, "27 Million", with worship leader Matt Redman. The aim, to raise awareness of modern-day slavery and to support the A21 Campaign, an organisation that work to fight human trafficking. Released on 27 February the single hit at No. 12 on the UK Singles Chart on 4 March. The band toured internationally with Redman, to raise awareness through worship/gig nights.

Since then, the band have been on-tour internationally, with dates in New Zealand and the EO Youthday in the Netherlands, along with other places.

LZ7 changed their touring lineup with a rolling lineup, with different members joining from show to show. 2012–13 saw a variety of faces at the front of the band: Adam Brown aka 'Ad-Apt' as Rapper and DJ, Jorge Mhondera as second vocalist and Joel Atkins playing drums for a period of time. The band has also seen support from 'Hobbit - The Human Soundscape' (Jack Hobbs), who has beat boxed for the band on tour and also for sessions in schools. The band often played with session musicians, such as Willie Weeks, Jake Isaac & Ben Smith. LZ7 continued with schools weeks, as a main part of what they do, in not just UK schools, but much of Europe and even Australasia. These include workshops, lessons, gigs, most of which are followed by an end of week gig.

In May 2013, American Ryan Sullivan, aka Remidee, joined and began fronting the band, alongside Lindz. The band also announced the upcoming release of their fourth album, to be called Aftershow. The title track, "#Aftershow", was released as a single, on 2 June. The album's second single, "Give out the Love", was released on 1 September. The full album was released in October 2013, containing 15 tracks of varying musical styles, from dubstep to dance. The tracks included collaborations with other artists such as Matt Redman on "Overcome by Love", Guvna B on "Whoever Said", Solomon Olds and Family Force 5 on "Next Level" and Jake Isaac on "Brave Face".

Since the release of Aftershow the band have continued touring with a rolling lineup, with core members Lindz West, Ryan Sullivan and Jorge Mhondera were also joined in other shows by singer Lucy West and session musicians; guitarist Willie Weeks, drummers Ben Smith and Andy Hutts.

In January 2015, LZ7 announced that they were working on their new album, with the working title #LZ7Album5. The album has been primarily produced with Solomon Olds, formerly of Family Force 5 and Phenomenon, alongside other producers including Cassell the BeatMaker.

LZ7 continue to tour, with Lindz West at the front of the band alongside Saint Louis (Louis Read), with Jorge Mhondera as male vocalist, alongside new female vocalist Lily Jo. The band continue to play with session musicians at different shows, including Ben Smith, Andy Hutts, Jonny Pike, Willie Weeks and Jack Hobbs (Hobbit).

The music video for the first single, "So Good", premiered on 17 November 2015. The second single from the album, "Home" was released on 18 March 2016 and the music video premiered on youredm.com on 11 April 2016. The full album of 13 tracks was released on 27 May 2016, including featured Soul Glow Activatur (aka Solomon Olds), Lauren Olds, Martin Smith, Ad-Apt and a remix of "Home" by Geekboy.

In 2017, the band continued releasing music, of a similar style to their previous album home. Working with again with producer and writer Soul Glow Activatur (aka Solomon Olds) the band released singles in June 2017: "Give My All" and "Golden". "Give My All" featured vocals from J Marie Cooper, while "Golden" featured vocals from Lauren Olds. The group also released a music video for "Give My All", filmed in locations around Iceland. In October, the band released an online exclusive track, "Eleven", with J Vessel, where the track and video were finished in a day, fans could watch a live stream event to see the progress throughout the day.

In 2018, LZ7 started releasing further new music. In May the group released a single "Legends" featuring vocals from Silentó. Lead singer West filmed the music video for the song in New York.

In September 2018 the band announced that they were supporting Jason Derulo on his 2 Sides world tour during October and November. As part of the tour, the band released a free download of their song "G.O.A.T", fans could sign a petition to "fight for peace" in their community on the band's website.

In October the single "Breakthrough" was released featuring vocals from Keelie Walker.

In June 2019, the group released their latest project named "These Are Better Days". The album included previously release singles alongside new material & remixes. The album includes features from Silentó, Daniel Eduardo, Keelie Walker, Ad-Apt, J Marie Cooper, S.O. (rapper) The group now tour their live show with West at the front with Mary Kate Matthews and Daniel Stephenson alongside.

In August, the group released "Forever Young", and in November, they released "Dance With Me", featuring Faith Child.

From March to May 2020, LZ7 held a live stream every Monday, Wednesday and Friday evening and released a new song, DJ set or remix under the title "Supply Drop" on Fridays. They also released three behind-the-scenes videos showing production of their new album, coming out later in 2020. Between 10 am on the 1 May and 10 am on the 2 May, they did a 24-hour, non-stop DJ set Cabin Fever, to honour Dave Clark, involved with the work of Open Arms, a project to support poor children in Kenya. By 10 am on Saturday, they had raised around £8000. On the 3 May, they released "Peace and Love". In mid-May 2020, the group announced they would release a new single, "Amazing Grace", featuring George Mhondera, on 15 May. On 25 May, LZ7 announced the release of "Churchboy", to be released on .

Linz hasn't been on pause. LZ7 keeps on performing on various places and stages and releasing multiple new singles. Last show was on Big Church Festival in UK in August 2025. There he "released" his latest single "Risk it all".

== Discography ==
=== Studio albums ===
Title	Album details
Ruckus	Released: 31 December 2005; Label: Survivor; Format: CD
Light	Released: 18 October 2010; Label: Integrity Music / Fierce!; Format: CD, Digital
Aftershow	Released: 6 October 2013; Label: Light; Format: CD, Digital
Home	Released: 27 May 2016; Label: Light; Format: CD, Digital
These Are Better Days	Released: 31 May 2019; Label: Light/ Kobalt; Format: CD, Digital

=== Extended plays ===
Title	Album details
Gasoline	Released: 15 August 2008; Label: Survivor; Format: CD
This Little Light - EP	Released: 26 September 2010; Label: Integrity Music / Fierce!; Format: Digital

=== Singles ===
Year	Title	Chart Peak positions		Album
Year	Title	UK	UK Indie	Album
2010	"This Little Light"	26	4	Light
2012	"Twenty Seven Million" (featuring Matt Redman)	12	—	Non-album singles
2013	"Aftershow Festival Edition"	—	—	Non-album singles
2013	"Aftershow"	—	—	Aftershow
2013	"Give Out the Love"	—	—	Aftershow
2015	"So Good"	—	—	Home
2015	"Home"	—	—	Home
2017	"Golden"	—	—	These Are Better Days
2017	"Give My All"	—	—	These Are Better Days
2018	"Legends" (featuring Silentó)	—	—	These Are Better Days
2018	"Breakthrough"	—	—	These Are Better Days
2019	"Forever Young"	—	—	Non-album singles
2019	"Dance with Me" (featuring Faith Child)	—	—	Non-album singles
2020	"Peace and Love"	—	—	Non-album singles
2020	"Amazing Grace" (featuring George Mhondera)	—	—	Non-album singles
2020	"Churchboy"	—	—	Non-album singles
2020	"Freefalling"	—	—	Non-album singles
2020	"Family"	—	—	Non-album singles
2020	"Sound of the Weekend"	—	—	Non-album singles
2020	"Won't Run Out"	—	—	Non-album singles
2020	"Gettin Wild"	—	—	Non-album singles
2021	"Only Hope"	—	—	Non-album singles
2021	"Back In Time"	—	—	Non-album singles
2021	"Energy"	—	—	Non-album singles
2021	"Last Night"	—	—	Non-album singles
2022	"Last Night"			
2023	"Same Line"			
2023	"Human"			
2023	"Plan B"			
2024	"Heart Unchained"			
2024	"Be Forever"			
2024	"Facts"			
2025	"The Send"			
2025	"Rewind"			
2025	"Risk it all"			

== See also ==
- List of Christian hip hop and rap artists
