= Where I Wanna Be =

Where I Wanna Be may refer to:

- Where I Wanna Be (Cravin' Melon album), 1995
- Where I Wanna Be (Donell Jones album), 1999
  - "Where I Wanna Be" (Donell Jones song)
- "Where I Wanna Be" (Shade Sheist song), 2000
- Where I Wanna Be (V*Enna album), by V*Enna, 2000
- Where I Wanna Be (Nathan Carter album), 2013
- "Where I Wanna Be", a song by Eric Church from his 2021 album Heart & Soul
