= Blessed Redeemer =

Christian hymn written by Avis Christiansen and Harry Dixon Loes

Blessed Redeemer is a prominent Christian hymn with lyrics by Avis Christiansen and music by Harry Dixon Loes of the Moody Bible Institute in Chicago, Illinois.

Loes developed the music and title after hearing a sermon entitled "Blessed Redeemer," and he asked Christiansen to write the lyrics. The hymn describes Jesus' death and atonement for sin on the cross at Calvary in Jerusalem as described in Matthew's and Mark's gospels in the New Testament for the redemption of sinners as explained in the New Testament Book of Romans. The song was first published in the Songs of Redemption (1920) published by the Baptist Home Mission Board (Atlanta, Georgia). Musical groups, including the Casting Crowns, have recorded versions of the song.
