= Gomér =

Gomér is a surname.

== People with the surname ==
- David Gomér, Swedish politician
- Gunilla Gomér (born 1960), Swedish politician

== See also ==
- Gomer
- Gomer (disambiguation)
