= Flevo =

Flevo can refer to:

- Lake Flevo (Lacus Flevo), a former lake (now the Zuiderzee), Netherlands.
- Flevoland, a province in the Netherlands
- Flevopolder, world's largest artificial island and polder in the Netherlands.
- The Flevo Festival, a Dutch Christian music festival
