= Bill Mason Band =

- Origin: England
- Genres: Punk rock, Christian punk
- Years active: 1970s, 1980s
- Label: Kingsway Music

The Bill Mason Band was one of the earliest Christian punk rock bands in the UK. They were active in the 1970s and 1980s.

== Background ==
The band originated in England's northwest and was founded by Bill Mason and Simon Hawthorne. Hawthorne's brother is Andy Hawthorne, a youth evangelist and founder of the group, World Wide Message Tribe. The Bill Mason Band was heavily influenced by the Boomtown Rats, The Clash, and Elvis Costello. In turn they, themselves had an effect on the punk and new wave scene. They were blackballed by the mainstream Christian community but they did via playing to young audiences, bring many youths to Christianity. They also had an appeal to the secular audience.

The Bill Mason Band had established themselves as a Christian punk band some five years before The Altar Boys appeared on the scene.

== Career ==
In 1977, the Bill Mason Band played at the Greenbelt Festival. They were followed by U2 who came without their instruments. They had to borrow the drum kit from the Bill Mason Band.

The Bill Mason Band recorded their debut album which was released on the Kingsway label in 1979. The following year, it had a reissue in the US on Star Song Records. By that time the group's reputation was growing due to their loud, aggressive, spiritually passionate music.

The group appeared on The Old Grey Whistle Test that was broadcast on Tuesday 1 April 1980.

== Later years ==
It was reported by Cross Rhythms on 1 July 2012 that Bill Mason was now based in Canada and was going by the name of Captain Bill. He had also released a children's album entitled Run to the Lord.

The Bill Mason Band got together to play a charity concert with band, After the Fire at the Maxwell Hall on 16 October 2010. The event was to raise money for the Dalit people of India.

The group's No Sham! album was reissued on CD by Born Twice Records in 2011.

== Musicians ==
- Bill Mason - Lead vocals, percussion
- Simon Hawthorne - Guitars, backing vocals
- Iain Beeston - Bass guitar, backing vocals
- Dave Rawding - Drums, percussion

=== Others ===
- Phil Holmes - Fender Rhodes, Korg synth, acoustic piano, vocals
- Paula Holmes - Backing vocals
- Steve Gilbert - Congas, whale noises
