= This Little Light of Mine =

Gospel song

- by Harry Dixon Loes
- Genre: Gospel
- Written: 1920s
- Based on: Matthew 5:14-16; Mark 4:21-22; Luke 11:33

"This Little Light of Mine" is an American gospel song that originated in the 1920s, when it was first sung in Christian churches and penitentiaries. The hymn is often attributed to evangelist Harry Dixon Loes who is said to have written it for children, using the biblical passage about the lamp under a bushel as inspiration. However, researchers at the Moody Bible Institute said they found no evidence that he wrote it, though they noted that Loes did create the popular arrangement of the hymn in the 1940s. The gospel song became popular among African-American Christians, and it was later adapted by Zilphia Horton, amongst many other activists, in connection with the civil rights movement. "This Little Light of Mine" is printed in the hymnals of various Christian denominations.

== History ==
The origin of the song is unclear, but the phrase "This little light of mine" appears published in poetry by 1925 by Edward G. Ivins, a writer in Montana. In 1931, the song is mentioned in a Los Angeles newspaper as "Deaconess Anderson's song". In 1932, the song was mentioned in a 1932 Missouri newspaper. In 1933, the song was mentioned in newspapers as being sung by a chorus at an African Methodist Episcopal conference in Helena, Montana, and then various other churches around the United States later that year. In June 1934 John and Alan Lomax made its earliest known recording, of Jim Boyd of Jacksonville, Texas, singing at the State Penitentiary in Huntsville, Texas. In 1939 Lomax returned to Texas with Ruby Lomax during their Southern States Recording Trip and recorded the song again. This song and others were sung by a black woman, Doris McMurray who was imprisoned at Thomas Goree Unit in Texas and said that she learned the song from her grandmother in Waco. She sang the following lyrics, taught to her by her grandmother:

This little light o' mine, I'm goin' let it shine

Let it shine, let it shine, let it shine.
Ev'rywhere I go, I'm goin' let it shine (repeat)
Let it shine, let it shine, let it shine, let it shine, let it shine.
In my neighbor's home, I'm goin' let it shine (repeat)

Let it shine, let it shine, let it shine.

Many other verses have been added over the years, including impromptu lines appropriate to the occasion. The song is sung around the world, with the simple lyrics and tune resonating with all ages. Harry Dixon Loes, who studied at the Moody Bible Institute and the American Conservatory of Music, was a musical composer and teacher, who wrote or co-wrote several other gospel songs. He wrote a popular adaptation of the song "This Little Light of Mine" in the 1940s but never copyrighted or claimed credit for writing the original, which remains of unknown origin.

Often thought of as an African-American spiritual, it can be found in modern hymnals such as The United Methodist Hymnal, #585, adapted by William Farley Smith in 1987, and in the Unitarian Universalist Hymn Book, Singing the Living Tradition, #118, with harmonies by Horace Clarence Boyer. The song does not appear in any of the major nineteenth-century collections of African American songs.

While the song is most widely recognized as an African American spiritual, over the years it has been transformed into a song of resistance adopted by Civil Rights Movements. With such joyful and hopeful lyrics, "This Little Light of Mine" brought unification and strength to social movements, allowing oppressed groups to reinforce their shared identity and communicate their demands for equity. Freedom Singing, a congressional style of singing that often uses church hymns as a form of resistance in social protests, was quite common especially during the Civil Right Movement in the 1960s. Rutha Mae Harris, one of the four original freedom singers from Georgia, said the song "helped steady protestors' nerves as abusive police officers threatened to beat them or worse." Singing this exuberant, spiritual song also helped to deescalate the tension and agitation during the protests.

== Theme ==
The hymn "This Little Light of Mine" takes its theme from Jesus's remarks to his followers in the Parable of the Lamp under a Bushel. Matthew 5:14-16 of the King James Version gives: "Ye are the light of the world. A city that is set on an hill cannot be hid. Neither do men light a candle and put it under a bushel, but on a candlestick; and it giveth light unto all that are in the house. Let your light shine before men, that they may see your good works and give glory to your Father who is in heaven." The parallel passage in Luke 11:33 of the King James Version gives: "No man, when he hath lighted a candle, putteth it in a secret place, neither under a bushel, but on a candlestick, that they which come in may see the light."

== Versions ==
Bettie Mae Fikes singing "This Little Light of Mine" in a church located in Selma, Alabama (2019)

The song was sung by Sister Rosetta Tharpe as early as 1960. The song has also been secularised into "This Little Girl of Mine" as recorded by Ray Charles in 1956 and later The Everly Brothers. It has often been published with a set of hand movements to be used for the instruction of children.

Under the influence of Zilphia Horton, Fannie Lou Hamer, and others, it eventually became a Civil Rights anthem in the 1950s and 1960s, especially the version by Bettie Mae Fikes. The Kingston Trio recorded it on College Concert in 1962, and The Seekers for their second UK album, Hide & Seekers (also known as The Four & Only Seekers) in 1964. Sam Cooke released his version on the 1964 live album Sam Cooke at the Copa. Over time it also became a very popular children's song, recorded and performed by the likes of Raffi in the 1980s from his album Rise and Shine. It is sometimes included in Christian children's song books.

Odetta and the Boys Choir of Harlem performed the song on the Late Show with David Letterman on September 17, 2001, on the first show after Letterman resumed broadcasting, after having been off the air for several nights following the events of 9/11. Reverend Osagyefo Sekou and other counter-protesters sang "This Little Light of Mine" defiantly before a crowd of white supremacists and alt-right supporters gathered for the Unite the Right rally in Charlottesville, VA in 2018.

The song featured on Hoyt Axton's 1963 album Thunder 'N Lightnin' named "This Little Light". LZ7 took their version of the song also named "This Little Light" to number 26 in the UK Singles Chart. The song is also sung in several scenes of the 1994 film Corrina, Corrina starring Whoopi Goldberg and Ray Liotta.

The song was also featured twice in the Power Rangers franchise. The first was in Power Rangers Jungle Fury in the episode "Ghost of a Chance", where Theo sings the song for a Spirit World test, and the second was in Power Rangers RPM in the episode "Ranger Red", where a mother sang the song to her baby.

Sharon, Lois & Bram recorded & performed the song on their television series Sharon, Lois & Bram's Elephant Show in 1987. It was featured in Season 4, Episode "Blackout".

The song was mixed with You Can't Be A Beacon by The Masters V (Later: J.D. Sumner and the Stamps) in 1988.

The song was sampled throughout the titular song to the 2012 film Let it Shine.

Meghan Markle and Prince Harry chose to end their wedding in May 2018 with a version of the song.

== See also ==
- Civil rights movement in popular culture
