= This Little Light =

Single by LZ7
- Released: 26 September 2010 (worldwide)
- Recorded: 2008
- Genre: Contemporary Christian, dance, hip hop
- Length: 3:31 (album version); 3:05 (radio rdit)
- Label: Fierce!

LZ7 singles chronology
| "This Little Light" (2010) | "Twenty Seven Million" (2012) |

"This Little Light" is a song by the British hip-hop act LZ7 and is based around a sample of the 20th century gospel track "This Little Light of Mine". It originally featured on the group's 2008 EP Gasoline, before being remixed in 2010 for inclusion on their second studio album, Light. This remix was released as LZ7's first official single on 26 September 2010, and was sold by independent label Fierce! exclusively as a digital download. The track was downloaded over 11,000 times in the UK, which gave it a chart peak of Number 26 on the UK Singles Chart and Number 4 on the UK Indie Chart.

Although largely ignored by the mainstream media, "This Little Light" received mostly positive reviews and was selected as the theme song for both the UK government's Shine Week 2010 and The Message Trust's Shine Your Light campaign—profits from sales of the single were donated to Shine Your Light. A different music video for "This Little Light" was produced for each different version. The first video, which accompanied the original 2008 version, was filmed at Rose Bridge High School in Wigan and features LZ7 members Lindz West and Louis Read handing out glowing lightbulbs from an ice cream van. The second music video, used to promote the 2010 single release, shows three examples of people being generous and the band performing in front of a tower block estate.

== Background and release ==
"This Little Light" is based around "This Little Light of Mine", a gospel song written by American composer Harry Loes in the early 20th century. It first appeared on LZ7's EP Gasoline, which was released in the UK in August 2008. It was then remixed in 2010 for inclusion as track one on the band's second studio album, Light, and was used as a theme song for both The Message Trust's charitable initiative Shine Your Light and the UK government's Shine Week 2010. LZ7 launched the 2010 remix at a gig at the Manchester Apollo, before promoting the track at summer festivals and an eight-date schools tour around Manchester. The band encouraged people to make a note of the release date and to download the single, with Lindz West, LZ7's frontman, remarking: "What we don't want is anyone phoning up stations and saying 'Why aren't you playing this song?', because that just creates a bad name for us in the first place. What we do want is people buying it and getting it to the position where it has to go on the radio airplay lists and the stations have to play it."

"This Little Light"
The chorus of the 2010 remix of "This Little Light" samples "This Little Light of Mine" by Harry Loes.

"This Little Light" was officially released in the UK exclusively as a digital download at midnight on 26 September through download stores such as iTunes and 7digital. It featured alongside remixes from Kenny Hayes and Starz Angels as part of a four-track EP, which was sold by record label Fierce! as a charity record to benefit Shine Your Light. After selling over 11,000 copies in the UK, "This Little Light" charted at Number 26 on the UK Singles Chart and Number 4 on the UK Indie Chart.

== Critical reception ==
As it was released on Fierce!—an independent label—"This Little Light" received little radio airplay and few reviews from mainstream music critics. What reviews it did receive were generally favourable. Tony Cummings of Cross Rhythms gave the single eight out of ten and said that it had "all the mixture of pop savvy and street vibe that could connect with a mass audience". Jono Davies of Louder Than the Music gave "This Little Light" five stars out of five, calling it a "very catchy pop Hip Hop song". Natalie Clark of SouthSonic gave the song four out of five, and described it as a "definite buy for alternative music lovers". A slightly more mixed review came from James Masterton of Yahoo! Music, who said that "as a pop record it isn't half bad", but that it was "never going to be particularly cool, no matter how hard anyone tries".

== Music videos ==
West hands a glowing lightbulb to a teenager in the first music video for "This Little Light".

Two official music videos for "This Little Light" were produced, one for each version of the song. The first video, filmed in 2008, was used to promote the original version of "This Little Light" that featured on Gasoline. It was filmed at Rose Bridge High School in Wigan, and begins by showing a group of teenagers in detention. An ice cream van, driven by LZ7 members Lindz West and Louis Read, drives onto the school grounds and parks next to the detention hall. Read begins playing "This Little Light" through the van's stereo system—hearing the song, the young people in detention rush over the window, then run downstairs to the van. West begins handing out glowing lightbulbs to some of the teenagers at the van, who hold them in the air. This sequence is interspersed with shots of LZ7 performing "This Little Light" live in front of a large group of young people outside Rose Bridge Sports & Community Centre. The video was uploaded to The Message Trust's official YouTube channel in November 2008. As of 1 September 2011, it has been viewed nearly 268,000 times.

LZ7 perform in front of a tower block estate in the second video for "This Little Light".

A second music video for "This Little Light" was specially filmed in 2010 to accompany the release of the new remixed version. It begins with shots of the members of LZ7 walking towards a tower block estate, in front of which they then perform the song. The video features three stories of people being either generous or compassionate: the first shows a young man delivering a bottle of milk to an elderly lady, the second shows another young man helping someone push start their car, and the final story shows a young woman consoling another young woman, who is crying. These stories are cut between shots of LZ7 performing "This Little Light" both in front of the tower block and in front of garages. This second video was uploaded to The Message Trust's official YouTube channel in August 2010. As of 1 September 2011, it has been viewed over 246,000 times.

== Track listing ==
Digital download
| No. | Title | Length |
|---|---|---|
| 1. | "This Little Light (Radio Edit)" | 3:05 |
| 2. | "This Little Light (Kenny Hayes Remix / All Around the World)" | 6:03 |
| 3. | "This Little Light (Starz Angels Remix)" | 5:48 |
| 4. | "This Little Light (Album Version)" | 3:31 |
| Total length: | | 18:27 |

== Chart performance ==
| Chart (2010) | Peak position |
|---|---|
| UK Indie (Official Charts) | 4 |
| UK Singles (Official Charts) | 26 |
