= Gomer (name) =

Gomer was the name of the son of Japheth in the Hebrew Bible. The wife of Hosea was also named Gomer.

People with this given name or surname include:

- Gomer Berry, 1st Viscount Kemsley (1883–1968), Welsh colliery owner and newspaper publisher
- Gomer Gunn (1885–1935), Welsh rugby union and rugby league footballer
- Gomer Hughes (1910–1974), Welsh rugby union and rugby league footballer
- Gomer Jones (1914–1971), American football player, coach and college athletics administrator
- Gomer Griffith Smith (1896–1953), American politician
- David Gomér (1897–1977), Swedish politician
- Ez Gomér (born 1962), Swedish vocalist, bass player, songwriter and producer
- Joseph Gomer (missionary) (1834–1892), African American missionary
- Joseph Gomer (pilot) (1920–2013), African-American World War II pilot, one of the Tuskegee Airmen
- Nina Gomer (1870–1950), American civil rights activist
- Robert Gomer (1924–2016), Austrian chemist and professor
- Sara Gomer (born 1964), English retired tennis player
- Steve Gomer, American film and television director who made his debut in 1987
