= Leviticus (band) =

Swedish Christian metal band

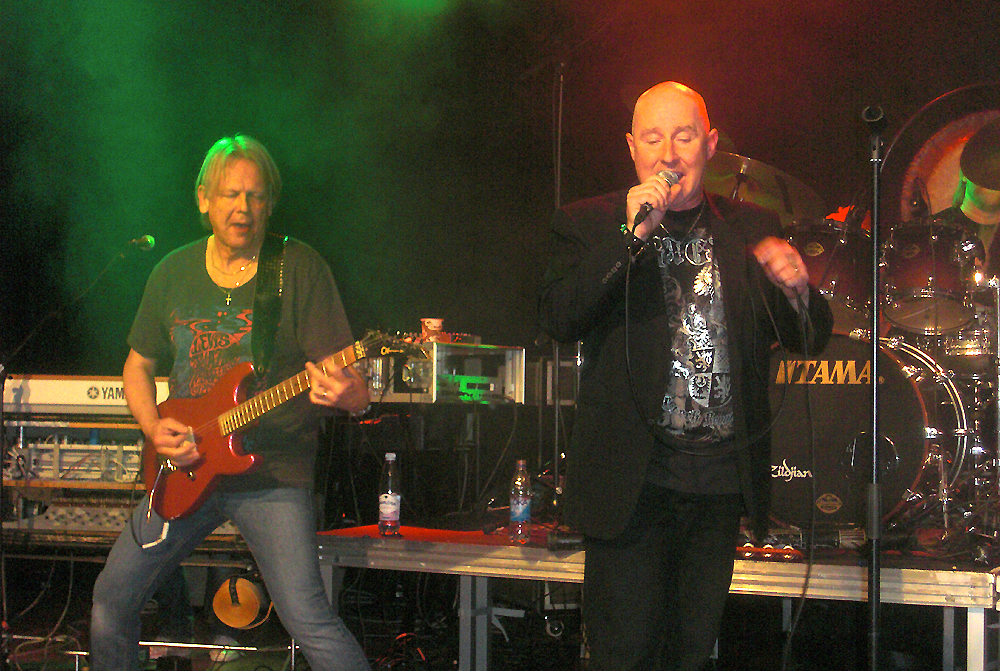
- Leviticus live 2011: Björn Stigsson and Peo Pettersson

Background information
- Origin: Skövde, Sweden
- Genres: Christian rock Christian metal
- Years active: 1981–1990, 2011–present (Reunion: 2003)
- Members: Kjell Andersson; Håkan Andersson; Peo Pettersson; Niklas Edberger
- Past members: Björn Stigsson; EZ Gomér; Terry Haw; Sonny Larsson; Nicklas Franklin; Dan Tibell

Leviticus is a Christian metal band from Sweden. The band formed in 1981 and led by Björn Stigsson until his passing in 2026. They released four albums before breaking up in 1990.

== Background ==
The band's early releases were metal with symphonic influences using the Roland synthesizer guitar and Moog Taurus pedals. Knights of Heaven showed a move toward a more melodic rock based sound.

A February 1986 profile in the Swedish magazine OKEJ, timed to coincide with the release of The Strongest Power, described how Leviticus concerts routinely paused mid-set for singer Håkan Andersson to read from the Bible and deliver a short sermon before the band resumed playing, a practice guitarist Björn Stigsson said no other hard rock band had done before them. In the article, Stigsson recounted that a young woman in Britain had converted from Satanism after hearing Andersson preach at one of their shows, and that the band remained in contact with her; he also said audience members sometimes flashed the "devil horns" hand sign at the band, which he described as an object of sympathy rather than provocation.

By that point the band had toured Germany, Norway, England and the Netherlands, and their debut album I Shall Conquer had recently been reissued in the United States with new cover artwork, accompanied by a music video for "Let Me Fight" made to help launch the record on the American market. The Strongest Power had recently been reviewed in Kerrang!, which rated it four out of five stars and praised Stigsson's songwriting. The band was planning a UK tour for June 1986 and hoped to secure a support slot on a US tour with Stryper that August, with further studio recording planned for that autumn and a new album expected in time for Christmas. The band opened for Twisted Sister during their UK tour in 1986.

In 1986 the band went through lineup changes: Ez Gomér was brought in to replace Håkan Andersson on bass, and Terry Haw joined. Both were with the band through Setting Fire to the Earth (1987), then left to form Jet Circus. With this lineup they toured extensively in Europe throughout 1986–1987.

They played the Greenbelt festival in England three times, 1984, 1985, and 1987, and the Scandinavium in Gothenburg twice (1985, 1987). The second appearance at the Scandinavium was with a festival, and was filmed by Sveriges Television.

In early '88 they toured again in Sweden and in April they returned to England. Their first United States tour was in August 1988, when they opened for Larry Norman and played as his backup band. In fall of that year they toured for two months throughout Europe. together with Bloodgood and concluded the year playing the Ennepetal Christmas Rock Night festival in Germany for the second time.

In 1989 they did touring again in Australia and completed two tours in the USSR. The same year they recorded Knights of Heaven in Los Angeles, produced by John Elefante.

Before breaking up in the latter part on 1990 they again toured in the United States and Canada.

The band (Jet Circus) did make an American appearance at the "Cornerstone" festival in Bushnell, Ill., the weekend of July 4, 1991.

The band re-formed in March 2003 to play at the final Bobfest. The show was recorded by Sveriges Radio and released to CD. The final Leviticus show was held in Hjo Sweden June 2003 a festival gig together with Swedish metal giants In Flames.

In 2011, Leviticus celebrated their 30 years anniversary with a concert, on May 7, 2011, at Valhall in Skövde, Sweden. The line-up was the same as on Bobfest, 2003, with only one exception: Håkan Andersson replaced Niklas Franklin on the bass guitar, and also performed vocals. They have continued to play since.

Founding guitarist Björn Stigsson died on 6 August 2026, aged 75, following a period of illness.

== Side projects ==
Gomer and Haw joined with drummer Little George to form Jet Circus in 1988. Jet Circus's first album, Step On It (1991), had a proto-rapcore sound. It was distributed in Europe by Pila Records, and introduced to the United States by Doug Van Pelt, Editor of HM Magazine. Despite quality issues due to its mastering Van Pelt dubbed it "the most creative release in Christian metal in 1990." After a long hiatus the band released No Mercy For The Living Dead in 2003. Ez also released a solo album – which became a Jet Circus album, when Terry left the band – entitled Look At Death Now in 2005. This album features artists including Mikkey Dee of Motörhead, Stefan Elmgren of HammerFall, and The Swedish Radio Symphony Orchestra. They have since released a remix album entitled Dance or Die.

Following the end of Leviticus, Stigsson formed XT with Sonny Larson. XT released three albums. Stigsson also released a solo project in 1987 entitled Together With Friends. Peo Pettersson is still active in numerous projects ex. Staggerwing, Sinisis and King & dreams.

== Members ==
=== Current members ===
- Håkan Andersson - bass (1981-1986, 1987-1988, 2011–present), vocals (1981-1986), keyboards (1981-1988)
- Kjell Andersson - drums (1981-1990, 2003, 2011–present)
- Peo Pettersson - vocals (1989-1990, 2003, 2011–present), keyboards (1989-1990)
- Niklas Edberger - keyboards (2003, 2011–present)

=== Former members ===
- Björn Stigsson - guitar (1981-1990, 2003, 2011–2026), keyboards (1981-1989)
- Sven "EZ" Gomer – bass, vocals, keyboards (1986–1987)
- Terje "Terry Haw" Hjortander – lead vocals (1986–1987)
- Sonny Larsson – lead vocals (1987–1988)
- Nicklas Franklin – bass (1988–1990, 2003)
- Dan Tibell – keyboards (1988)

== Discography ==
=== Studio Albums ===
- 1983: Jag skall segra! (Stanley & Andrew Music)
- 1984: I Shall Conquer (Shadow Records/Talking Music)
- 1985: The Strongest Power (Twilight records/Pure Metal Records) (One of the best records of the year) Mark Putterford Kerrang Magazine !!
- 1987: Setting Fire to the Earth (Royal/Solid Rock Import), Review: CCM Magazine)
- 1989: Knights of Heaven (Royal)

=== EPs ===
- 1982: Stå och titta på (EP)
- 2024: MMXXIV (Talking Music)

=== Singles ===
- 1984: Let Me Fight - Day By Day (12" single, Talking Music TALKS 1014)
- 1987: Love Is Love / Flames of Fire (7" vinyl (45 RPM)) (Royal)
- 1989: Isn't It Love / Born Again (7" vinyl (45 RPM)) (Royal)

=== Live ===
- 2003: Live at Bobfest 2003 (BTS Records)

=== Compilations ===
- 1993: Best of Leviticus (Viva)
- 2016: 35 Years Anniversary - In His Service (Talking Music)

=== Others ===
- 1987: Together With Friends – Björn Stigsson (solo album with Leviticus members)
