= Christine Caine =

Australian activist, evangelist, and speaker (born 1966)

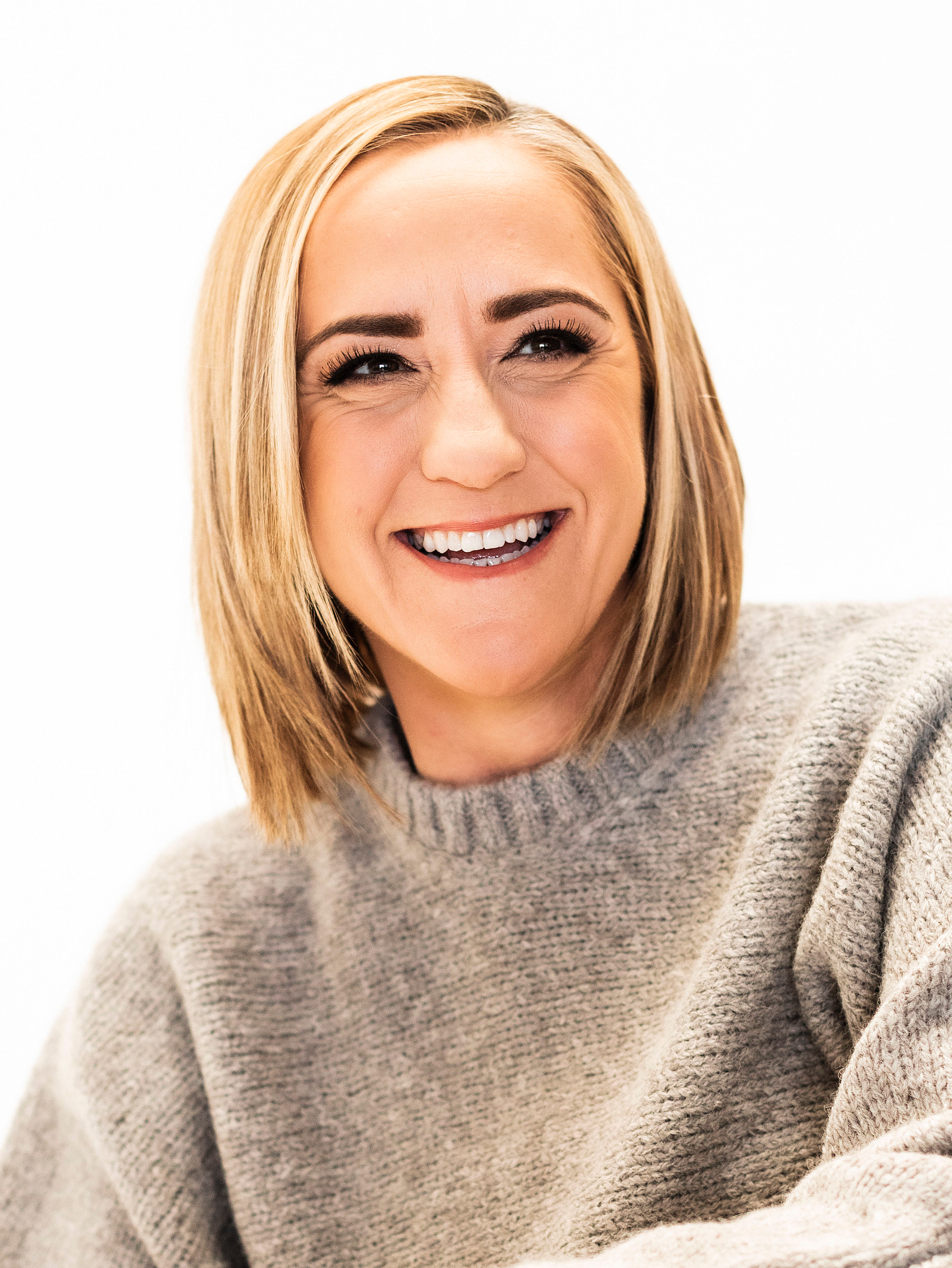
- Caine in 2020
- Born: Christine Caryofyllis; 23 September 1966 (age 59)
- Occupations: Activist; speaker; author; Founder of The A21 Campaign & Propel Women
- Known for: Christian, Leadership
- Spouse: Nick Caine (m. 1996)
- Children: 2

Christine Caine (née Caryofyllis, 23 September 1966) is an Australian activist, evangelist, author, and public speaker.

Caine and her husband Nick are best known for founding The A21 Campaign in 2008, a 501(c)(3) non-profit, non-governmental organization that combats human trafficking around the globe. In 2015, Caine founded Propel Women, a Christian women's organization. Caine and her husband are also founders of Zoe Churches, which has locations in Bulgaria, Poland, and Greece. Caine has written numerous books on Christianity, including A Life Unleashed (2012), Run to Win (2008), and Resilient Hope (2022). Caine speaks about faith and leadership at conferences and other events across the globe.

== Early life and education ==
Australian-born and of Greek descent, Christine Caine was adopted at birth by Greek Orthodox immigrants who raised her in public commission housing in Lalor Park, New South Wales, Sydney, Australia. She attended Lynwood Park Public School and Blacktown Girls High School. Caine survived several years of sexual abuse as a child.

She graduated from the University of Sydney with a degree in English. Caine also attended and graduated from Hillsong College in 1992. In 2022, Caine graduated from Wheaton College with her M.A. in Evangelism and Leadership as part of a cohort-based program in partnership between Propel Women and Wheaton College.

== Career ==
Caine grew up in the Greek Orthodox Church in Australia. She first volunteered as a youth worker, when she helped establish Hills District Youth Service. She went on to become the director of a nationwide youth ministry, Youth Alive. In 2008 she founded the A21 Campaign with her husband Nick, who is now the CEO of A21 and pastor of Zoe Churches. A21 is a 501(c)(3) non-profit, non-governmental organization which fights to "abolish slavery everywhere, forever". With 19 locations in 14 countries, their aim is to prevent human trafficking through awareness, to protect trafficked victims in their shelters and transition homes, to prosecute traffickers and strengthen the legal response to human trafficking, and to partner with law enforcement, individuals, corporations, official bodies, and other non-governmental organizations to end human trafficking in the 21st century.

In January 2015, Caine founded Propel Women, an organization focused on empowering women to fulfill their potential. Propel Women aims to honor the calling of every woman, empower her to lead, equip her for success, and develop a sense of God-given purpose.

Caine has also been featured on several international television shows, including TBN's Praise the Lord, Life Today with James Robison, Better Together, Huckabee, Joyce Meyer's Enjoying Everyday Life, and Daystar. In October 2016, TBN launched a weekly TV show featuring Caine called Equip & Empower with Christine Caine.

In May 2018, author Carey Scott sued Caine and her publisher, HarperCollins Christian Publishing, for alleged copyright infringement of Scott's work in Caine's book Unashamed (2016) and in a derived work Unshakeable (2017). A settlement was reached in October 2018 and later printings of the works credited Scott's work or were reworded.In 2022, Scott told reporter Julie Roys that she opted for a settlement after discovering her husband had been having multiple affairs. She felt she needed to focus all of her energy on supporting her children even though she felt she could have won her suit against Caine.

== Personal life ==
Caine married Nick Caine in 1996. They have two daughters. Caine is a cancer survivor.

== Works ==
- Resilient Hope: 100 Devotions for Building Endurance in an Unpredictable World. 2022. ISBN 978-0310457961
- How Did I Get Here?: Finding Your Way Back to God When Everything is Pulling You Away. 2021. ISBN 978-1400226566
- 20/20: Seen. Chosen. Sent. 2019. ISBN 978-1535952323
- Undaunted: Daring to Do What God Calls You to Do (updated and expanded). 2019. ASIN: 0310355885
- Unexpected: Leave Fear Behind, Move Forward in Faith, Embrace the Adventure. 2018. ISBN 0310351243
- Unstoppable: Step Into Your Purpose, Run Your Race, Embrace the Future (with study guide). 2018. ASIN: 0310351367
- Unshakeable: 365 Devotions for Finding Unwavering Strength in God’s Word. 2017. ISBN 0310090679
- Unashamed: Drop the Baggage, Pick up Your Freedom, Fulfill Your Destiny. 2016. ISBN 0310340705
- Unstoppable: Running the Race You Were Born to Win. 2014. ISBN 9780310341185
- Undaunted: Daring to Do What God Calls You to Do. 2012. ISBN 0310333873
- A Life Unleashed: Giving Birth to Your Dreams. 2012. ISBN 0980518733
- Can I have and Do It All Please? 2009. ISBN 0980518717
- Run to Win: Pursuing God and Finishing Strong. 2008. ISBN 1903725798
- The Core Issue. 2007. ASIN: B008SYRDS2
- Stop Acting Like A Christian. Just Be One. 2007. ISBN 0830743731
- Youth Ministry. 2002. ISBN 0957871910
- Certain Uncertainty. 2009. ASIN: B002TVLKL6
- Passion: Living Life Large. 2006. ASIN: B0051QYW5M
- DNA of a Leader. 2006. ASIN: B00589YV2Q
- I’m Not Who I Thought I Was. 2006. ASIN: B001HEM10K
- Possessing the Promise. 2005. ASIN: B0084V78DO
- Understanding Teenagers. 2005. ASIN: B001O8OQT8
- Your Dreams Can Come True. 2005. ASIN: B005C4WGJ2
- God Wants You To Win. 2004. ASIN: B009BIDAT0
- Relationships: An Issue of the Heart. 2003. ASIN: B005FGOFT6
- Activating Your Potential. 2003. ASIN: B007Q1WMHA
- Relationships Q&A. 2003. ASIN: B005FGOFT6
