= Avis Christiansen =

Avis Marguerite Burgeson Christiansen (also known by the pen names of Avis Burgeson, Christian B. Anson and Constance B. Reid) (October 11, 1895 – January 14, 1985) was an American Christian hymnwriter. She wrote the lyrics to "Blessed Redeemer" with Harry Dixon Loes writing the music.

Avis Marguerite Burgeson was born in 1895 in Chicago, Illinois to a Christian family and wrote poems as a child. Avis Christiansen became a member of the Moody Memorial Church in 1915 and remained a member for forty years serving in various ministries. She attended a secretarial school and then the evening school at the Moody Bible Institute where her husband, Ernest O. Christiansen, worked for almost forty years, eventually serving as vice president. Avis and Ernest Christiansen married in 1917 and had two daughters. Avis Christiansen died in 1985.
