= Christmas Rock Night =

Annual music festival in Ennepetal, Germany

Christmas Rock Night is a Christian music festival held annually during December in Ennepetal, Germany. The festival does not focus on particular styles of Christian music, but leans toward harder forms including metal and alternative.

== Background ==
Founded in 1980, the first festival drew only three bands. Since then it has expanded to a two- to three-day event which regularly draws international artists such as Skillet, Icon For Hire, Fireflight, P.O.D., Disciple, Saviour Machine, Petra, Bride, and Split Level.

The festival has spawned a few spinoff festivals. Fishcore, a one-off festival, was held in 1999. It featured European bands such as Noise Toys, Lightmare, and Sacrificium in competition with each other. Legends Of Rock is a best-of festival held closer to Spring in 2007, 2008 and 2009. This festival features international bands such as Bloodgood, The Electrics, Glenn Kaiser Band, and Rex Carroll, sometimes for reunion events.

In 2007 the festival, under the leadership of Detlev and Martina Westermann, took the German Promikon Award in the category "Best Christian organizers."
