= Twenty Seven Million =

Single by Matt Redman and LZ7
- Released: 27 February 2012
- Recorded: 2011
- Genre: Hip house, contemporary Christian music
- Length: 4:16
- Label: Survivor / sixsteps
- Songwriter(s): Matt Redman, Beth Redman, Lindz West, Lucy West, George Mhondera, Willie Weeks
- Producer(s): William Weeks, George Mhondera

Matt Redman singles chronology
"Never Once" (2011)	"Twenty Seven Million" (2012)	"'10,000 Reasons (Bless the Lord)'" (2012)

LZ7 singles chronology
"This Little Light" (2010)	"Twenty Seven Million" (2012)

Music video
- "Twenty Seven Million" on YouTube

"Twenty Seven Million" is a song released by English Christian worship leader, songwriter and author Matt Redman and English Christian electronic dance music group LZ7. The song was released in the United Kingdom as a digital download on 27 February 2012.

== Background ==
Matt Redman & LZ7 released the song on 27 February 2012 intending to raise awareness for the anti-human trafficking movement. The record is in support of the A21 Campaign, and the aim to abolish modern day slavery. Redman said: "It's a huge issue in our world that's rising to the surface. Governments, police and the media are all talking about it, and the church is doing a lot of stuff - this is a song to recognise that and hopefully drive some more awareness. Let's propel this somewhere good together, make some noise about this issue that is on the heart of God and the heart of the Church."

== Track listing ==
Digital download

1. "Twenty Seven Million" - 4:16

== Charts ==
Chart (2012)	Peak position
Scotland (OCC)	24
UK Singles (OCC)	12
US Christian Songs (Billboard)	45

== Release history ==
Country	Date	Format	Label
United Kingdom	27 February 2012	Digital download	Survivor Records / Sixstepsrecords
United States	28 February 2012	Digital download	Sixstepsrecords
