= Cravin' Melon (EP) =

EP by Cravin' Melon
- Released: July 25, 1995
- Genre: Pop/Rock
- Label: Seedless Records

Cravin' Melon chronology
Cravin' Melon (1995)	Where I Wanna Be (1995)

Cravin' Melon is the debut EP by Cravin' Melon, released in 1995.

== Track list ==
All tracks are written by Cravin' Melon.

No.	Title	Length
1.	"Sweet Blossom"	4:45
2.	"One and Only Friend"	3:29
3.	"Land of Oz"	4:03
4.	"Got No Time"	3:32
5.	"Save Me"	4:45
