= Bettie Mae Fikes =

American singer

Bettie Mae Fikes (born April 16, 1946) also known as The Voice of Selma, is an American singer and civil rights activist.

Fikes singing "This Little Light of Mine" in Selma, Alabama, in 2019.

== Life ==
Born in Selma, Alabama in 1948, she began singing at the age of four.Early on, at the age of four, Fikes fell in love with the power of gospel singing while attending church on Sunday's with her gospel-singing mother. Fikes was a member of the Student Nonviolent Coordinating Committee (SNCC) Freedom Singers, and became known as "the Voice of Selma". At 16, she joined the SNCC to get out of her house and to find something to do. Soon, she found a righteous cause to be a part of. The enormity of the cause would soon become apparent. Fikes would personally take part in sit-ins at whites-only restaurant counters, bus boycotts, school walkouts and voter registration rallies. Fikes briefly described some of the horrific scenes that she witnessed over the years from beatings and shootings to stabbings and fire bombings. Those disturbing images forever seared into her memory. She was jailed as a teenager in 1963 for her participation in a Selma protest and was also involved in Bloody Sunday in 1965.

She performed at both the 1964 Democratic National Convention and the 2004 Democratic National Convention where Maya Angelou introduced her. In 2020, she sang at the funeral services for John Lewis, which she indicated might be her final public performance. In 2023, Fikes joined President Biden to commemorate the 58th anniversary of Bloody Sunday in Selma, Alabama where she also received a standing ovation at the State of the Union.

== Bibliography ==
- Hutchinson, John (26 August 1999). The Hutchinson Encyclopedia Of Modern Political Biography. Avalon Publishing. ISBN 978-0-8133-3741-8.
- Living Blues Publications (2007). Living Blues. Vol. 188–193. Living Blues Publications.
