= Cravin' Melon =

- Origin: Clemson, South Carolina
- Genres: Rock; Roots rock Folk rock
- Years active: 1994–2001; 2008–Present
- Labels: Seedless Records; Mercury Records; Solaris Entertainment

Cravin' Melon is a rock band based out of Clemson, South Carolina, United States. The band is composed of Doug Jones (lead vocals, guitar), Jimbo Chapman (lead guitar, vocals), Rob Clay (bass, vocals), Gary Greene (drums, vocals), Chad Barger (keyboards, vocals).

== History ==
Cravin' Melon was formed at Clemson University in 1994 after the dissolution of two other local South Carolina bands, Doghouse and The Next Move. The band gained popularity on the regional live scene, and after a self-pressed EP and full-length, they signed to Mercury Records and released Red Clay Harvest, in 1997. The album spawned a minor radio hit, "Come Undone", which peaked at #37 on Billboard's Mainstream Rock chart. The band's style and geographical roots prompted frequent comparisons to contemporaries and tourmates Hootie & the Blowfish and Edwin McCain. After a 1998 EP, the band was dropped from the label and recorded a final LP in 2000 before breaking up on May 19, 2001; a double live CD of one of their last performances was subsequently released. The band reunited in 2008 for a reunion tour. They continued to do shows in 2010. Lead singer Doug Jones released a solo album in 2007 Doug Jones Everybody Doug Jones. At their December 26, 2009 concert at the Wild Wing Cafe in Greenville, SC, the band announced plans to make a new album in the near future. March 18, 2019, Jimbo Chapman and Doug Jones just announced that Cravin' Melon signed with Solaris Entertainment.

== Members ==
- Doug Jones – Vocals
- J. J. Bowers – Bass (Former)
- Jimbo Chapman – Guitar
- Rick Reames – Drums (Former)
- Rob Clay – Bass/Vocals (Former)
- Kerry Brooks - Bass
- Gary Greene – Drums (Former)
- Tim Haney - Drums
- Chad Barger – Keyboards

== Discography ==
- Cravin' Melon (EP) (1995)
- Where I Wanna Be (Seedless, 1995)
- Red Clay Harvest (Mercury, 1997) #18 Billboard Heatseekers chart
- Squeeze Me (live EP, Mercury, 1998)
- The Great Procrastinator (Seedless, 2000)
- Cat's Cradle (double live LP, 2001)
