= Red Clay Harvest =

Studio album by Cravin' Melon
- Released: January 28, 1997
- Genre: Pop/Rock
- Length: 54:23
- Label: Mercury
- Producer: Don Smith

Cravin' Melon chronology
Where I Wanna Be (1995)	Red Clay Harvest (1997)	Squeeze Me (1998)

Professional ratings
Review scores
Source	Rating
AllMusic	3/5 stars
The Encyclopedia of Popular Music	3/5 stars
Stereo Review	3/5 stars

Red Clay Harvest is an album by Cravin' Melon, released in 1997.

The album was the band's major label debut. Benmont Tench and Tommy Stinson contributed to the album. "Come Undone" was a minor Billboard Mainstream Rock hit.

== Critical reception ==
Stereo Review wrote: "When you've got good songs, a great lead voice, and solid supporting players, you don't really need attitude, tattoos, and studio tomfoolery." The Encyclopedia of Popular Music called the album "an excellent introduction to the group's relaxed, highly tuneful rock/pop fare."

== Track listing ==
Red Clay Harvest track listing
No.	Title	Length
1.	"Come Undone"	4:40
2.	"Sweet Tea"	3:47
3.	"Pretend"	3:56
4.	"Post Office"	4:32
5.	"Hey Sister"	5:06
6.	"Simple Man"	4:59
7.	"Nobody's Prize"	3:47
8.	"Can't Find My Way"	4:28
9.	"Joda"	3:38
10.	"Come a Day"	4:53
11.	"Blossom"	5:05
12.	"Faithless Me"	5:32
Total length:		54:23

== Personnel ==
- Jimbo Chapman - guitar
- Rob Clay - bass
- Doug Jones - vocals
- Rick Reames - drums
