= The A21 Campaign =

International non-governmental organization

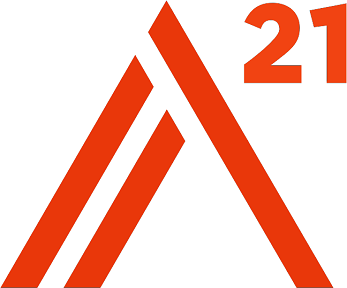
- Founded: 2008; 18 years ago Australia
- Founder: Christine Caine
- Type: Non-profit; INGO
- Headquarters: Costa Mesa, California, United States
- Location: Australia, Bulgaria, Cambodia, Denmark, Greece, Norway, South Africa, Spain, Thailand, Ukraine, the United Kingdom, the United States
- Services: Combating human trafficking, slavery and bonded labor, involuntary domestic servitude, and child soldiery
- CEO: Nick Caine
- Website: www.a21.org

The A21 Campaign (commonly referred to as "A21") is a global 501(c)(3) non-profit, non-governmental organization that works to fight human trafficking, including sexual exploitation and trafficking, forced slave labor, bonded labor, involuntary domestic servitude, and child soldiery. The organization was founded by Christine Caine, an international motivational speaker, in 2008.

One aim of A21's Campaign says, "We exist to abolish slavery everywhere. And with your help, we will." their focuses are on combatting slavery around the world through educational awareness and prevention, the protection of survivors, the prosecution of traffickers, and various partnerships. The A21 Campaign has branches in the Australia, Bulgaria, Cambodia, Denmark, Greece, Norway, Portugal, South Africa, Spain, Thailand, Ukraine, the United Kingdom, the United States and more.

== History ==
Christine Caine, a leader from Hillsong Church, founded The A21 Campaign organization in 2008 after she discovered what she believes to be insufficient action taken against human trafficking. Her husband, Nick Caine, is the organization's director.

== Work ==
The A21 Campaign develops global programs and initiatives to inform the general public about human trafficking, as well as encouraging the public to fight against trafficking in their own way. The A21 Campaign is one of few international organizations addressing the human trafficking problem in Europe. Recent UN findings show that the former Soviet Union, as well as other countries in Central and Eastern Europe, have replaced Asia as the main source of women trafficked to Western Europe. In addition, Western Europe contains many of the highest-ranking destination countries in the Human Trafficking Citation Index.

According to their mission statement, The A21 Campaign works towards:

- Prevention, through awareness and education. They have created student programs and curriculum resources for schools, orphanages, and universities to educate potential victims and the general public about trafficking. The Campaign has released their US certified high school program called "Bodies are Not Commodities", which seeks to raise awareness about human trafficking amongst ninth and tenth graders. The goal is to teach students to help prevent human trafficking before it begins, making use of all forms of communication, from their abolitionist A-teams raising awareness to global mass media.
- Protection, by providing care through their shelters and transition homes across Europe. These shelters and transition homes are safe places for victims. The A21 Campaign works to move trafficking survivors past crisis to stabilization, equip them with skills they can use in the future, and assist them with making the next step after they leave the homes.
- Prosecution of traffickers and the strengthening the legal response to human trafficking. The A21 Campaign offers legal counsel to every victim in their care, and represents them in criminal proceedings.
- Partnering with local law enforcement, service providers, and community members to meet a comprehensive set of needs for those rescued from bondage.

Their efforts are focused in and supported by teams in Greece, Ukraine, Australia, US, Bulgaria, United Kingdom, Norway, South Africa, Thailand, and Spain, where trafficking is most active. Greece, a destination country for human trafficking, and other Eastern European countries, including Ukraine and Bulgaria, are countries of origin, and increasingly countries of destination, for victims of trafficking. The United States, Great Britain, and Australia are destination countries for trafficking victims, while South Africa and Thailand are both sources and destinations for trafficking victims.

== Funding ==
The A21 Campaign is a non-profit, non-governmental organization. The organization is funded through donations from individuals, faith-based organizations, businesses and other partnerships. One partner of The A21 Campaign is the Row for Freedom team. This all-female UK team rowed across the Atlantic Ocean, following an old slave trade route from the Canary Islands to Barbados, and crossed over 2,600 miles in a record-setting 45 days to raise awareness and funding for The A21 Campaign.

== Recognition ==
The A21 Campaign was referenced in both the 2011 and the 2012 publications of the United States Department of State publication of the Trafficking in Persons Report.

The A21 Campaign partnered with recording artist Matt Redman and LZ7 to release a single titled Twenty Seven Million. The song was inspired by The A21 Campaign and was aimed at raising global awareness and was released on February 27 of 2012, in recognition of the estimated 27 million slaves throughout the world today. The A21 Campaign was also featured on the Global Freedom Report to raise awareness of human trafficking, while A21 representative Phil Hyldgaard was named a 2012 TIP Report Hero by the U.S. Department of State.

== See also ==
- List of organizations that combat human trafficking
