= Galactus Jack =

British DJ and EDM producer

- Origin: England
- Genres: EDM; Christian EDM
- Years active: 2008–present
- Label: Message
- Website: www.galactusjack.co.uk

Galactus Jack, real name Ben Jack, is a British DJ and EDM producer who was once one third of House music outfit Aorta and now part of the Message Trust in Manchester, England.

== Biography ==
Ben grew up in Cambridge, England where he picked up an interest in DJing and electronic music production as a teenager. Having spent two years working for British Youth For Christ where he toured the UK, he formed the house music group Aorta with DJ and friend Simon Dayman in 2002.

=== Aorta ===
Aorta was born when friends and DJs Ben Jack and Simon Dayman felt frustrated at the lack of diversity in Christian worship music. They set about to create a group which encouraged the church to think outside the box on matters of musical and non musical worship. The duo were joined in 2004 by producer Andy Searle Barnes, and quickly established themselves with appearances all over the UK, including the Greenbelt festival, Spring Harvest, and Soul Survivor (charity).

In August 2005 the group released their debut EP Love Hope Future on Rubik Records to positive reviews.

In 2008 the band announced they would be separating in July to concentrate on solo projects.

=== Going solo ===
As a solo artist Galactus Jack moved in a slightly different direction, embracing a broader EDM sound and a stronger focus on faith themes that would help listeners connect to the Christian gospel message. His debut single 'Headspace' gave fans their first taste of his solo material, showcasing a rockier edgier sound. The single was featured on the various artists album The Rose Sessions: Volume One (TVCM Music 2008). Galactus Jack has since produced five EP's and an Album (2016's UNIVERSAL), and has toured extensively around the UK, throughout Europe and into Asia and North America.

=== Reality Bytes (2009) ===
Reality Bytes was the Debut EP from Galactus Jack, released on 27 April 2009 worldwide through TVCM Music. The EP was written and produced with Chris Taylor at Liverpool's Rooftop Audio Studio's and features guest vocals from CCM artist Shell, MC Ad-Apt and singer/songwriter Lindsey and utilised live electric guitar parts and an electronic/rock hybrid sound.

"Reality Bytes" received positive reviews from various online sites such as Cross Rhythms, Soul Audio and Louder Than The Music and won Independent Contemporary Album of the Year at the Christian Broadcast Council Awards 2010.

=== NEON (2012) ===
Neon was co-written and produced with Roo Walker over the first six months of 2012, and was released independently to a strong critical reception in July.

The EP was predominantly an instrumental work drawing influences from French electronic artists such as Justice, Cassius and Daft Punk and moved Galactus Jack back to his house DJ roots. The title track was the sole featured vocal on the EP, an epic two part chill out track featuring Dawn Elektra.

=== UNIVERSAL (2016) ===
UNIVERSAL, the debut album, was released through the Message Trust, with who Galactus Jack has been working with full-time since 2014. Featuring collaborations with Lucy Speakman (Brightline), Crown Freedom (Vital Signs), Geek Boy, Lucy West (Vienna; Blush UK), and Jonathan Ogden (Rivers and Robots), UNIVERSAL embraced various styles within the EDM genre, from the commercial house sounds of Captured and Heaven, to the big room sound of Existence. Released on 29 July, once again the critical response was overwhelmingly positive with Louder Than The Music heralding it as "modern, dance inspired, cool and fresh" and awarding it 5/5, and OneManInTheMiddle saying "this is a release that is bang up to date for the EDM crowd. If that’s your thing then my suggestion is get this album, I don’t think you’ll be disappointed" in their 8.9/10 review.

=== Younger Days (2017) ===
Younger Days was released as three EP's throughout 2017, with the full album to be all three EP's and new material collected onto one release in spring 2018. Part I was a four track EP and exclusive Geek Boy remix, released in March and included the single 'I Got You feat. Soulbox', which featured a music video shot on location in New York City.<ref </ref> Part II was released on 25 August as a double A-Side single featuring the tracks 'Lay It Down feat. Philippa Hanna' and '100 feat. Dawn Elektra'. Part III is released on 15 December and brings the EP releases to a climax before the album arrives in the spring, and features three original songs including collaborations with Twelve24, Roberto Rosso, Ad-Apt and SoulBox, plus an exclusive remix of the Part II track '100' by drum and bass DJ/Producer BCee which received its debut play from Rene LaVice on BBC Radio 1's drum and bass show on 12/12/17.

"The final part of the EP series has some of my favourite new songs on it from Younger Days, both musically and lyrically, as well as having my mate and all around legend Bcee bringing some drum and bass remix vibes to 100" said Galactus Jack.

== Discography ==
Albums and EPs

- Love Hope Future EP - As part of House music outfit Aorta released on Rubik Records (2005)
- Reality Bytes EP - TVCM Music (2009)
- NEON EP - Independent (2012)
- UNIVERSAL - Message (2016)
- Younger Days: Part I EP - Message (2017)
- Younger Days: Part II EP - Message (2017)
- Younger Days: Part III EP - Message (2017)

Other projects

- The Rose Sessions: Volume One - Various Artists album compiled by and featuring Galactus Jack (July 2008)
- The Rose Sessions: Volume Two - Various Artists album produced by and featuring Galactus Jack (Dec 2010)
