= Harry Dixon Loes =

Christian hymn writer

Harry Dixon Loes (October 20, 1892 – February 9, 1965) was an American composer and teacher, best known for his arrangement of the gospel song "This Little Light of Mine". Loes was a prolific composer and hymn writer, hymnal editor, and music professor, as well as musical director in several churches and an evangelist for more than a dozen years.

== Life ==
Harry Loes was born in Kalamazoo, Michigan as the son of Fred Loes and Louise Novak Loes. He was the musical director in several churches. Subsequently, Loes became involved in evangelistic work for more than a dozen years. Afterwards he became a music teacher at the Moody Bible Institute in 1939, where he worked until his death. He adopted the middle name of "Dixon" as an homage to the former pastor of the Moody Church, Dr. A. C. Dixon. In 1924 Loes married Garnet Leonard.

Loes was first inspired by Paul Rader during a sermon at the Moody church about “All that I want is in Jesus” in 1915. After hearing the sermon, Loes wrote the lyrics of a hymn called "All Things in Jesus" which was later sung by the youth group of the church. During his lifetime, Loes crafted the words to over 1,500 hymns, and created the music for some 3,000 others. He died in Chicago on February 9, 1965, at the age of 72.

== This Little Light of Mine ==
Loes is often credited with composing "This Little Light of Mine", c.1920. However, the evidence that he actually created the song is lacking. Loes wrote a popular adaptation of "This Little Light of Mine" in the 1940s, but never copyrighted or claimed credit for writing the original, which remains of unknown origin. Daniel Harper points to a story that is typical of apparent myths about the song published in Ace Collins' book Music for your heart: Reflections from your favorite songs, saying the author provided "no documentation whatsoever for any of [his] assertions" that Loes composed the song.

"This Little Light of Mine" was an important song during the U.S. civil rights movement and as part of the protests during the 2015 Baltimore, MD protests. The song was also covered by contemporary artist Bruce Springsteen in Dublin.

== Blessed Redeemer ==
It has been said that "Blessed Redeemer" was inspired by a sermon at the Moody church "which reflected the subject of Christ's atonement". After composing the melody Loes asked his friend Avis Christiansen to write the lyrics. Christiansen provided words and arrangements for Loes' compositions. "Blessed Redeemer" was first published in 1920 in the hymnal Songs of Redemption.

== Other hymns ==
Loes also wrote the music to "Blessed Redemer", "All Things in Jesus", "Love Found a Way", and "Shine for Jesus Where You Are". In addition to his musical contributions, Loes also wrote the lyrics to "All Things in Jesus", and "Shine for Jesus Where You Are" and "At the Judgment Bar".
