= Ez Gomér =

Swedish musician

Ez Gomér (born September 3, 1962) is a Swedish vocalist, bass player, songwriter and record producer.

Vocalist and bass guitarist, Ez Gomér got his start in the mid-eighties when he joined the Swedish melodic metal band Leviticus in time to perform on their third release Setting Fire to the Earth (1986). In 1987, after some extensive European and American touring with Leviticus and after opening for bands like Uriah Heep, Nazareth and Twisted Sister, Gomér felt it was time to move on. During his tenure in Leviticus, Ez struck up a friendship with the band's lead vocalist Terry Haw which at this time, which led to the formation of new group called Jet Circus consisting only of Gomér and Haw. As a live act a drummer was added and showed the band as a trio.

== Biography ==
=== Creating Hybrid Metal ===
Gomér wanted to create something fresh and different and told "The whole idea was to dig inside instead of looking at others." Experimenting and having fun was high priority. As a result, the two came up with the creative "hybrid-form" of funky groove-laden hard rock – found on the Sony Epic 1991, US debut release for Jet Circus, Step On It.

Jet Circus landed an endorsement deal from Harley-Davidson in time for the American release "Step On It." Perhaps Derek Oliver of British Kerrang! said at the time: "Jet Circus is the best band I’ve heard to come out of Scandinavia – this band is brilliant."

With the 1991 US radio hit song "Victory Dance", Jet Circus were amongst the first to experiment with metal and rap, which later on led them to be mentioned in the media as grandfathers for bands like Limp Bizkit and Linkin Park. Ez Gomér replied: "That’s fine with me as long as I don’t have to retire".

In time for their first US tour, Jet Circus went No1 on the CCM radio chart with "Break This Jail" and were played om air somewhere in the States every twenty minutes for almost a year with songs like "Victory Dance", "Rockin Horse", "Jet Blue", "Step On It" and "Break This Jail" – which also went on to be “Metal song of the year” on CCM.

Following a tour of the U.S that same year, Ez and Terry Haw began writing and recording the material that would make up Jet Circus' sophomore effort – No Mercy For The Living Dead, but with never ending hassle with the record company, this album project is still unfinished. No Mercy For The Living Dead was recorded 1992–93 and 2004.

Terry Haw who, since 1993, showed less interest in the band left the band finally in 2003, leaving Gomér to be the sole member of Jet Circus.

After the American Sony Epic debut, Jet Circus have since then released albums in Japan (Virgin/All Fired Up) South America – Brazil, Argentina, Puerto Rico, Peru, Europe – Scandinavia, England, Germany, Belgium, Netherlands, Italy, Spain and sold approximately half a million albums.

From 1993 to 2004, Gomér recorded with bands and artists such as: Mikkey Dee (Motorhead, Dokken), Tony Carey (Rainbow), Stephen Pearcy (Ratt), BB Cunningham (Jerry Lee Lewis), James Lott (Carl Perkins, Johnny Cash), Sayit, (Tony Franklin, Richard Marx), Tommy Denander (Toto, Paul Stanley, Radioactive), Jani Stefanovic (Divinefire, Miseration) Pete Pritchard (Scotty Moore, Eric Clapton).

Gomér runs his studio Hypersonic Studios and advertising agency in the heart of Gothenburg, Sweden and has been working as a lecturer at the University of Skövde, teaching entrepreneurship and song writing.

== Discography ==
Year	Band	Album	Role	Notes	Ref
Unreleased	Jet Circus	Dance or Die			
1986	Leviticus	Setting Fire to the Earth	Bass		
1989	Jet Circus	Step On It	Bass, keyboard, backing vocals		
1991	Arrival Records compilation	Righteous Metal II		Jet Circus' "Victory Dance"	
1992	Compilation	The Heaven's Metal Collection 1		Jet Circus' "Step On It"	
1993	Wonderland Records compilation	Motion Factory		Jet Circus' "Victory Dance (Leather Mix)"	
2003	Jet Circus	No Mercy for the Living Dead			
2005	Jet Circus	Look at Death Now	Bass, vocals		
2005	Paradoxx	Contamination			
2005	Sha-Boom	The Race Is On	Bass	"Get the Party Started"	
2006	Templar	Witch Hunt			
2006	Liberty N' Justice	Soundtrack Of a Soul	Vocals	"Kings of Hollywood"	
2007	Liberty N' Justice	Independence Day	Bass, vocals		
2007	Veni Domine	Tongues	Bass	"October" and "Stay With Me"	
TBD	Ez Gomér	Vegas Overdose			

Sources: Angelic Warlord, Kerrang, Bridefan, No Life Til metal, Rad Rockers, Phantom Tollbooth, Freewebs, Cross Rhythms, CCM
