= Faith Child =

- Also known as: Faith Child, Faith Kid, MC Faith
- Born: Michael Oluwaseyi Ayo; 5 March 1989 (age 37); London, England
- Genres: Christian hip hop, CEDM
- Occupations: Rapper; songwriter
- Instrument: Vocals
- Years active: 2008–present
- Website: faithchildmusic.com

Michael Oluwaseyi Ayo (born 5 March 1989), known by his stage name Faith Child, is a British Christian rapper. He has released three studio albums, Illumination in 2009, Airborne in 2015, and When Faith Feels Far in 2025.

== Early life ==
Faith Child was born Michael Oluwaseyi Ayo on 5 March 1989, in London, England, to a mother of four children. Her motto was; "'Don't abort the baby, I have put him there for a plan and a purpose and when he grows up he will be a man after my heart and he will serve me.'"

== Music career ==
Faith Child's music career started in 2000 at age 11 when he was in a group called Godz Inheritorz, in which he did his first UK support tour on the Phat'N'Heavy tour. After the group disbanded a couple of years later, Faith took time to focus on his education. During his secondary education, he featured on Praise Project by L'Dubzy in 2005 and shortly after in 2007 featured on 'Bibles, Bibles' by Simply Andy.

In 2008, Faith Child released his debut single, "I Like It", and this was followed-up by "Flashback" in November 2009 and then his debut studio album, Illumination in December 2009 His subsequent studio album, Airborne, was released in 2015.

He won best Best Gospel Act at MOBO Awards 2015. He has opened for MOBO Award winner Tinie Tempah and shared the stage with the likes of Lecrae, Terrell King, and Kirk Franklin.

Along with 'Airborne', Faith acquired a number of awards, nominations, and accolades resulting in him touring 12 countries across four continents in 2016, as well as meeting the President of Slovenia whilst on tour there and closing 2016 with a performance for the Mayor of London, Sadiq Khan, at the Mayor's Christmas Carol Service.

In 2025, Faith released his most recent studio album, When Faith Feels Far. Mundane Magazine called it "vulnerable, unpretentious, and built to lift."

== Discography ==
Studio albums

- Illumination (2009, Independent)
- Airborne (2015, Independent)
- When Faith Feels Far (2025, Wings Music Group)
