= La Gomera (disambiguation) =

La Gomera is the second-smallest of Spain's Canary Islands.

La Gomera may also refer to:

- La Gomera, Escuintla, a municipality in the Escuintla department of Guatemala
- La Gomera Airport, an airport located near the village of Alajeró, Spain
- La Gomera giant lizard, a lacertid lizard species

== See also ==
- Peñón de Vélez de la Gomera, one of the Spanish occupied territories in North Africa off the Moroccan coast
- San Sebastián de la Gomera, a district on the northeastern coast of La Gomera in the province of Santa Cruz de Tenerife of the Canary Islands
- Gomero Wall Gecko, a species of lizard in the family Gekkonidae
- La Gomera (The Whistlers), a Romanian crime thriller film
