= Split Level (band) =

Northern Irish Christian rock band

- Origin: Northern Ireland
- Genre: Christian rock
- Years active: 1986–2000
- Labels: Word Records, Organic Records
- Past members: Adrian Thompson; Shane Jackson; Rob Craner; Gary Preston; Barry Kennedy; Derek Currie; Chuck Cummings; Jaz Greer

Split Level were a Christian rock band from Northern Ireland, active from 1986 to 2000.

== History ==
Split Level first began their career in the mid-1980s, playing local Christian gatherings and festivals in Northern Ireland. A song of theirs appeared on a 1985 Word Records compilation called The Buzz on the Streets. Their debut recording appeared in 1986 on Big Feet Records, followed by the 1987 release Sons of Liberty on Word Records.

They began playing events in England soon after, and eventually relocated to England permanently. In 1991 they released View of a World, their first record to be pressed on CD, on German label Pila Records. Working with producer Andy Piercy, the full-length Boomerang followed in 1992 to critical acclaim in the Christian music press. The European Christian Booksellers' Journal named Boomerang its Album of the Year in 1993. Their 1994 EP, Call Me White Call Me Black, was first recorded with the intent of selling during their Artists Against Racism tour in Germany, but was later tapped for general release. In 1995, the European Christian Booksellers' Journal gave Split Level its award for Best Christian Rock Band. Their next full-length, glo.bal, was released in both the UK and the U.S. in 1997 on Pamplin Music. Their 2000 live release was recorded in Ennepetal, Germany at the Christmas Rock Night festival 1998.

== Members ==
=== Final Lineup ===
- Adrian Thompson – vocals, guitar
- Rob Craner – drums, backing vocals
- Gary Preston – bass, backing vocals

=== Other past members ===
- Chuck Cummings – drums
- Derek (Del) Currie – bass, backing vocals
- Barry Kennedy – drums, backing vocals
- Jaz Greer – drums
- Shane Jackson – keyboards
- Fionn Brannigan – Guitar
- David Dunlop – Guitar, Vocals
- William Rea – synths, keyboards
- Mervyn Dunlop
- Richard Morrison

== Discography ==
- Break the Chains (1986)
- Sons of Liberty (1987)
- Bootleg Demos (1989)
- View of a World (1991)
- Boomerang (1992)
- Call Me White Call Me Black EP (1994)
- glo.bal (1997)
- Live (2000)

"Live" (Remixed) (2023)
