= XT (band) =

- Origin: Sweden
- Genres: Christian metal
- Years active: 1991–1995

XT was a metal band from Sweden. It was formed by Bjorn Stigsson and Sonny Larson in 1991, following the breakup of Stigsson's earlier band Leviticus.

The band, whose name means "Christ" released three albums before their breakup in 1995. They became better known in Japan than either Europe or the United States.

Prior to forming XT, Sonny Larson had been involved in a few other Swedish metal bands as lead vocalist. While in Motherlode (1983–1987) he worked with Mark Stanway, who was later in the British melodic rock band Magnum. Motherlode released one album, Sanctuary, in 1986. Following Motherlode, he joined Charizma and stayed with them until 1988.

Beyond Leviticus and XT, Stigsson also released a solo project in 1986 called Together With Friends.

== Discography ==
- 1992: XT (Viva)
- 1993: Taxfree (Viva)
- 1995: Extended Empire (Review: Cross Rhythms)
- 2017: Saved By The Blood (Talking Music)
- 2019: Revived ...standing for Jesus Christ (Talking Music)

== Members ==
- Bjorn Stiggson - guitar (1991-1995, 2017-present)
- Sonny Larson - vocals (1991-1995, 2017-present)
- Danne Tibell - Keyboards (2017-present)
- Peter Carlsohn - Bass (2017-present)
- Thomas Weinesjö - drums (2018-present)

== Former Members ==
- Hakan Andersson - bass (1991-1993)
- Michael Ulvsgärd - drums (1991-1993)
- P-O Larsson - bass (1993–1995)
- Nicklas Jonsson - keyboards (1993-1995)
- Mike Nordstrom - drums (1993–1994, 2017-2018)
- John Stark - bass (1995)
- Kjell Andersson - drums (1995)

=== Citations ===
- Hale, Mark (1993). Headbangers. Ann Arbor, Michigan: Popular Culture, Ink. ISBN 1-56075-029-4..
