= List of medical abbreviations: G =

Sortable table
Abbreviation	Meaning
G	gravidity (total number of pregnancies, successful or not)
G	guanosine
G6PD	glucose-6-phosphate-dehydrogenase
GA	general anaesthesia
GA	gestational age
GABA	gamma-aminobutyric acid
GABHS	group A beta-hemolytic streptococcus
GACI	Generalized Arterial Calcification of Infancy
GAD	Generalized anxiety disorder
GAF	Global Assessment of Functioning
GAPS	Guidelines for Adolescent Preventative Services
GAS	Group A Streptococcal
GAS	General Adaptation Syndrome
GAS	Gender Affirming Surgery
GAS	Global Assessment Scale
GAVE	Gastric antral vascular ectasia
GB	gallbladder
GBC	Gallbladder carcinoma
GBS	group B Strep.
GBS	Guillain–Barré syndrome
GBM	glioblastoma multiforme
GBM	glomerular basement membrane
GC	general condition
GC	gonococcus
GCA	giant-cell arteritis
GCS	Glasgow Coma Scale; Complete Blood Count; Graduated compression stockings
GCT	germ cell tumor glucose challenge test Giant cell tumor
G-CSF	granulocyte colony-stimulating factor
GD	gender dysphoria
GDA	gastroduodenal artery
GDLH	glutamate dehydrogenase
GDM	Gestational Diabetes Mellitus
GDMT	Guideline Directed Medical Therapy
GDP	guanosine diphosphate
GDS	Geriatric Depression Scale
GERD	gastroesophageal reflux disease
GFR	glomerular filtration rate
GGO	ground glass opacification
GGT	gamma glutamyl transferase
GGTP	gamma glutamyl transpeptidase
GH	growth hormone
GHRF	growth hormone releasing factor
GHRH	growth hormone releasing hormone
GI	gastrointestinal; gastrointestinal tract
GIA	A model of surgical staple (GI: Gastro-Intestinal)
GIB	gastrointestinal bleed
GID	gender identity disorder
GIS	GastroIntestinal Surgeon
GIFT	gamete intrafallopian transfer
GIST	gastrointestinal stromal tumor
GIT	gastrointestinal tract
GITS	gastrointestinal therapeutic system
GLF	ground level fall
GMC	general medical condition (e.g., 0 GMC)
GM-CSF	granulocyte macrophage colony-stimulating factor
GMFCS	gross motor function classification system
GMP	guanosine monophosphate
GN	glomerulonephritis
GNRH	gonadotropin-releasing hormone
GOAT	Galveston Orientation and Amnesia Test
GOC	Goals of care
GOD	glucose oxidase
GOMER	get outta my emergency room
GORD	gastro-oesophageal reflux disease
GOT	glutamic-oxalacetic transaminase
GP	general practitioner Goodpasture's syndrome
GPA	granulomatosis with polyangiitis
GPCL	gas permeable contact lens
GPT	glutamic-pyruvic transaminase
Gr	grain
GRAV I	gravidity = 1 (indicating a woman during her first pregnancy)
GSW	gunshot wound
GTCS	generalised tonic-clonic seizure
GTN	glyceryl trinitrate gestational trophoblastic neoplasia
GTT	glucose tolerance test gestational trophoblastic tumor
Gtts	guttae (drops)
GU	genitourinary gastric ulcer
GUM	genitourinary medicine (often used more restrictively as alternative to sexually transmitted disease clinic)
GvH	graft-versus-host
GvHD, GVHD	graft-versus-host disease
GXT	graded exercise test
GYN	gynecology
