= The Message Trust =

UK Christian charity organization

- Founded: 1992
- Founder: Andy Hawthorne OBE
- Type: Registered Charity number: 1081467
- Location: Manchester, England
- Region served: UK
- Website: http://www.message.org.uk

The Message Trust is a Christian charity working to improve the lives of people in the UK and beyond through work in schools, prisons and communities.

Working in partnership with churches and other organisations, The Message is in contact with around 100,000 young people each year.

The Message was founded by Andy Hawthorne OBE.

In 2018, The Message was named the Best Not-For-Profit To Work For in the Sunday Times' annual Best Companies survey.

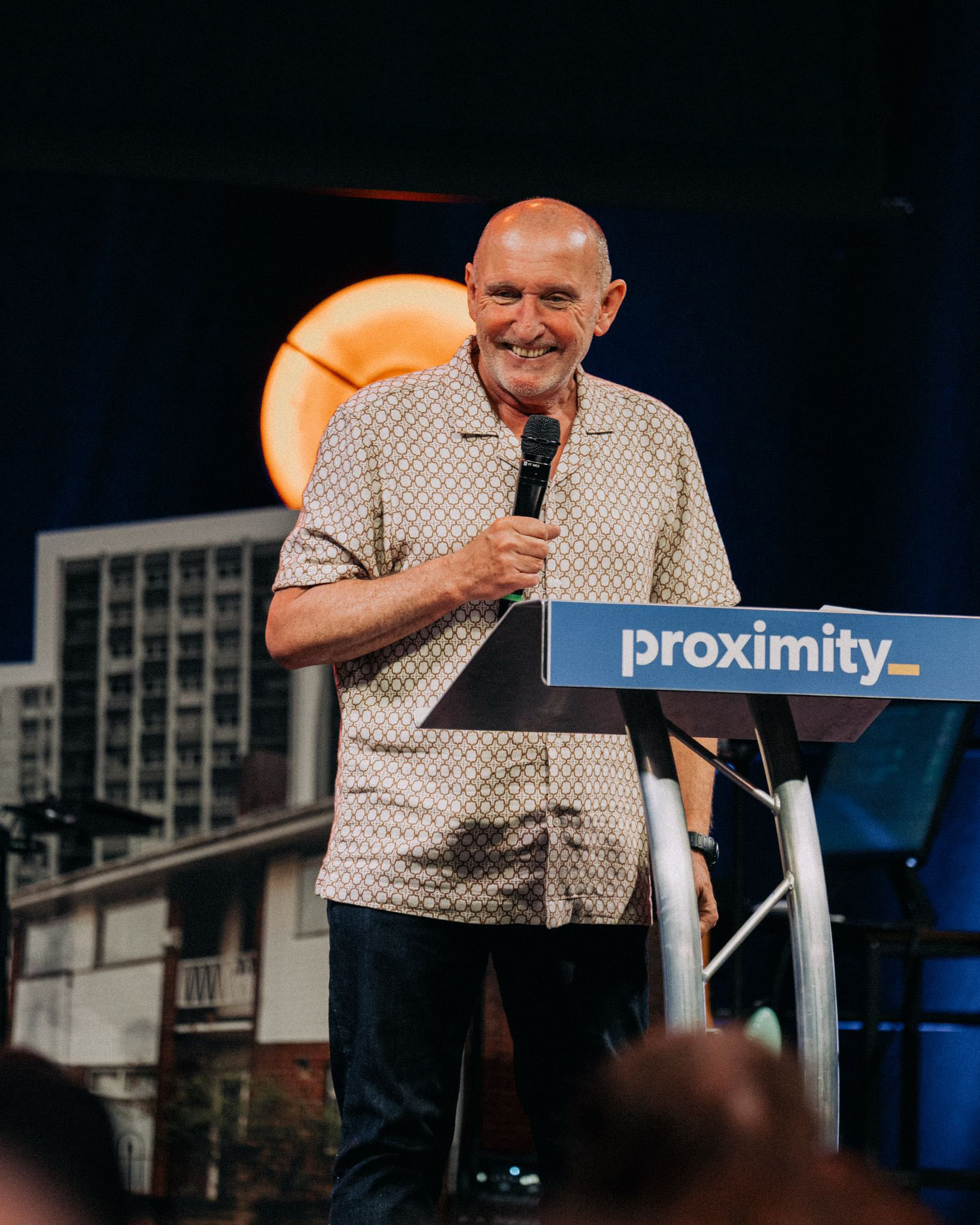
Andy Hawthorne speaking at Proximity Conference, May 2025

== History ==
The history of The Message is told in Andy Hawthorne's books, The Message 20 - Celebrating Two Decades of Changed Lives, and Diary of a Dangerous Vision.

The Message Trust has its roots in a week-long youth event that took place at the Manchester Apollo in 1988, Message '88. Founder and current CEO Andy Hawthorne together with his businessman brother Simon felt stirred to present the Christian gospel message relevantly to the young people of Manchester and organised a week of mission gigs at the Apollo. Message ‘88 attracted over 20,000 young people to hear live performances by bands and artists and a presentation of the gospel message.

A repeat run in 1989 attracted similar numbers and led to the brothers being approached by a member of one of the bands involved about forming a full-time youth mission to schools. ‘Message to Schools’ was the result, formed with the express purpose of taking the gospel to young people in schools through hip hop and dance music.

As the team continued to develop a sharper focus on Manchester, particularly the toughest areas and estates, the charity expanded their initiatives from just schools work, changing its name to what we know it as today, The Message Trust.

In more recent years, The Message has expanded into other parts of the UK, and across the world, with Advance Groups meeting in 108 nations across the globe.

== World Wide Message Tribe and creative teams ==
The Message has a history of engaging young people with a message of hope through creative mission, including the development of popular music. The World Wide Message Tribe, later shortened to simply The Tribe, was initially formed to run the schools weeks. Demand for the band to play in schools and further afield quickly increased and the Tribe went on to record successful albums which brought international recognition and critical acclaim. The Tribe disbanded in 2004, but The Message's schools work has multiplied with new creative teams to reach young people in high schools in Greater Manchester and beyond.

These have included bands LZ7, Twelve24, Vital Signs, MaLoKai, Blush, BrightLine, KineticIV, SoulBox, Amongst Wolves, OTC and NXT CHAPTR; theatre company In Yer Face; dance crew Square1; sex, relationships and self-esteem team Respect ME.

== Eden ==
As the team developed a sharper focus on Manchester, and particularly the more economically deprived areas of the city, Andy Hawthorne and team developed a vision of Christians moving into these areas to live and work and supported local churches to reach young people. This initiative was named Eden, and the first Eden partnership was launched in 1997 in Benchill, Wythenshawe: at that time the most deprived neighbourhood in the UK. Others followed and over the last 30 years, they have established more than 80 Eden teams, with 850 volunteers, in key areas of urban challenge in Greater Manchester and across the UK. The history and philosophy behind Eden is explained in Matt Wilson's books Eden: Called to the Streets and Concrete Faith. In 2009, the Eden Network was formed with the aim of spreading the Eden vision to other urban areas across the UK, and 2014 saw the first Eden team outside the UK in Cape Town, South Africa. Eden launched in the neighbourhood of Downtown Eastside, Greater Vancouver, Canada in 2018. In October 2024, Message Brasil set up their first Eden team in Santa Marta.

=== Message Bus ===
A bus ministry was launched in early 2000, to extend The Message's reach. The Message Buses (formerly Eden Buses) are mobile youth centres, equipped with technology and staffed by volunteers from local churches. Each week the 6 buses visited deprived neighbourhoods in the North West, London, South Wales, Midlands, and Yorkshire and the Humber, working with hundreds of young people each week.

== Festivals and tours ==
=== Message 2000 ===
In the summer of 2000, The Message partnered with another Christian youth charity, Soul Survivor, to run an ambitious citywide youth mission, Message 2000. Around 10,000 young Christian volunteers worked in partnership with Greater Manchester churches on social, environmental and crime reduction projects. The project was hailed as a success, not least because during the 10 days of work in one estate, Swinton Valley, there were no recorded incidence of crime. Since the summer of 2000, police have reported a sustained reduction in crime.

=== Festival:Manchester ===
In the summer of 2003, The Message partnered with the Luis Palau Evangelistic Association, to put on another week-long citywide venture, Festival:Manchester. Over 5,000 young people got involved in a total of 317 local community projects, many in association with Greater Manchester Police. Around 55,000 people from across Manchester attended the open-air festival that took place in Heaton Park the following weekend, featuring Luis Palau, and performances from The Tribe, Michael Tait and TobyMac.

=== The Higher Tour ===
In 2015, The Message announced plans for the Higher Tour, a UK-wide mission to share the gospel with young people in schools and arenas. In partnership with LZ7, Twelve24 and Chip Kendall, the tour was first delivered in Greater Manchester in 2016, reaching 35,000 young people in 55 schools over three weeks. Since then, Higher has visited the Midlands, Cambridgeshire, the Channel Islands and South Wales. As the UK went into lockdown in 2020, the Higher Tour went online and the team delivered lessons and entertainment content through YouTube and social media. Since 2022, The Higher Tour has continued to run in South Africa in person, in schools and youth groups.

=== Festival Manchester ===
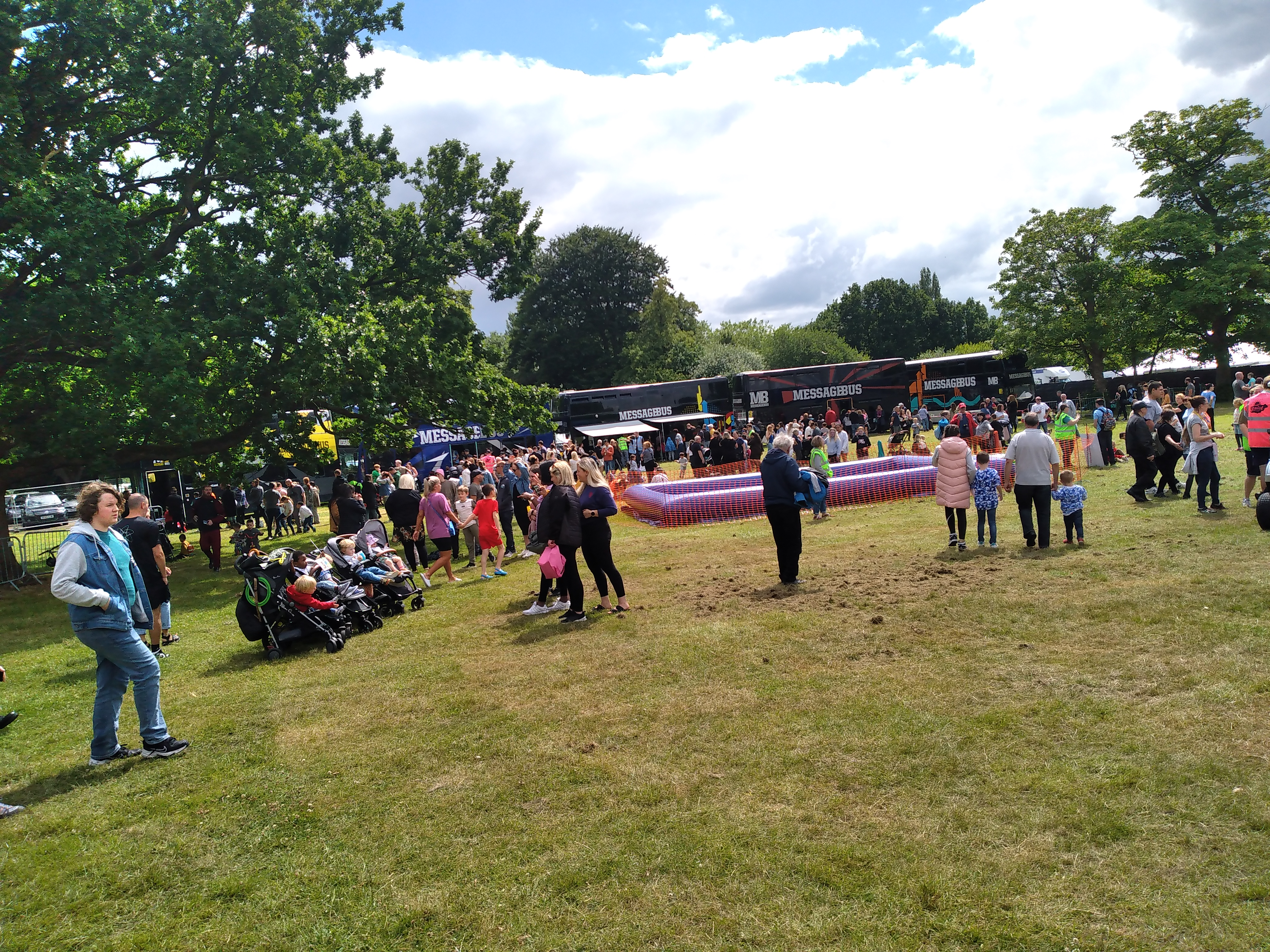
Messagebuses at Festival Manchester 2022

In 2022, a second free event, Festival Manchester took place in Wythenshawe Park over three days in July 2022. Alongside gaming tents, a skatepark and fairground, the live stage featured Grammy Award winning artists such as Matt Redman, Lecrae and Goodboys.

=== No More Knives Tour ===
As a response to the increased number of knife-related incidents in the UK, The Message started a school tour encouraging young people to abstain from carrying knives. These lessons, supported by the police, teach young people not to carry knives. Alongside the tour, The Message band OTC, released the song 'Lay Your Knives Down' which was performed as part of the tour, and at the end-of-tour gigs. In 2024, The Message launched the No More County Lines tour to address the increasing danger of drug dealing and exploitation and to support young people in making positive choices.

== 'Words and action' evangelism ==
The model of ‘words and action’ evangelism which characterised both Message 2000 and Festival:Manchester continued in the ‘Big Deal’, ‘Hope 08’ and 'Shine Your Light' initiatives. Supported by police, schools and councillors, Big Deal and Hope 08 brought together local communities to deliver social action and community-building projects in the ten boroughs that make up Greater Manchester. These range from environmental clean-ups, painting, car washes, barbecues, children's activities, fun days and youth concerts. In 2010, The Message launched a national campaign to spread the model of 'words and action' evangelism further, challenging young people to complete 15 specific acts of kindness in their local communities during the summer of 2010.

== Ministry in prisons ==
The Message was a founder member of the Reflex network in partnership with Youth For Christ, delivering ministry in prisons across the North West of England. Outreach workers engage mainly with young offenders between the ages of 18 and 21 but also with juvenile offenders aged 17 and under. Their work spans first-contact detached work on the prison wings through to help with resettlement back into the community in conjunction with the Message Community Hub (see below).

== Message School of Evangelism ==
The Message School of Evangelism (formerly Genetik/Message Academy) is an annual gap-year programme for young people aged 17 and over who wish to train in Christian mission and youth work. Nearly 500 young leaders were trained by The Message between 2001 and 2018. The Message School of Evangelism course runs over 10 months and involves placements in The Message's community-based Eden projects and partner organisations. Guest tutors have included Matt Redman.

== Message Enterprise ==
In January 2013, the charity opened the Message Community Hub (Formerly Message Enterprise Centre), a new business and training hub for young people in the region. Building on The Message's track record for mentoring young men and women from disadvantaged communities and those leaving custody, the centre has created several new businesses which employ ex-offenders. As of February 2019, these include The Mess Café, a property maintenance and development business, and events businesses. The Community Grocery flagship store was also opened in the Message Community Hub.

== Community Grocery ==
During the first Covid lockdown in 2020, The Message Trust responded to food poverty in Wythenshawe by delivering 60,000 meals and food parcels to families across the area.

As lockdown lifted, they set up The Community Grocery in Sharston, one of the first of its kind in the UK. For just £5 a year, and from £5 a shop, members come into store and can choose 12 items of food from fridge and freezer, tinned goods, bakery, fresh fruit and veg and household goods. The Community Grocery works with a number of major partners and suppliers from FMCG companies who have a surplus of food, helping to reduce food waste. They also work with other charities and church partners to provide practical support, including cookery classes, money management and the Alpha course.

As of March 2023, they have 21 Community Groceries across the UK including Lincoln, Telford, Bolton, Ilford and Burnley, feeding over 40,000 families each week.

== Advance ==
In 2017 The Message was a founding partner of Advance 2020 along with the Church of England, Evangelical Alliance, Hope, Luis Palau Association and Redeemed Christian Church of God (RCCG). The groups are designed to encourage, train and disciple Christians for practicing and proclaiming the gospel into the world. This is achieved through monthly small group gatherings using the free 3-year mentoring material. The organisers say that Advance exists “for anyone who wants to grow their understanding of the gospel and their ability to share it”. Advance Groups run in churches, homes, universities, and a wide range of locations in more than 96 nations around the globe. Course materials are translated into native languages to equip the groups and churches as they are trained.

== Regional and international hubs ==
During 2014, two UK hubs were launched to develop The Message's reach across Scotland and the Midlands. In September 2015, Message Wales was launched when Ignite merged with the Message Trust. Gary Smith, founder of Ignite was appointed Message Wales Director. Since then, The Message have established additional UK hub locations with offices across the UK.

The Message South Africa launched in March 2014, first in Cape Town and then across South Africa. In 2016, The Message Canada was launched in Vancouver, Canada, followed by The Message Germany in Annaberg-Buchholz in 2017.

=== Regional UK Hubs ===
- London
- East Midlands
- West Midlands
- Yorkshire and Humberside
- North East
- North West
- Wales
- Scotland

=== International Hub ===
- South Africa
- Canada
- Germany
- Brazil
- Netherlands
- Uganda

== Awards ==
Name of Award	Date
Sunday Times Best Not-For Profit To Work For	2018

=== Urban Hero Awards ===
July 2008 saw the first annual Urban Hero Awards at which young people are honoured for notable achievements, often against the odds. The awards have been repeated each year since, with winners from all over England emerging from Eden work in Yorkshire to the Message School of Evangelism programme in Manchester. The Urban Hero Awards 2018 took place at Lancashire County Cricket Club's Old Trafford ground with 800 guests.

== See also ==
- Galactus Jack
