= Andy Hawthorne =

British evangelist, author and founder of The Message Trust

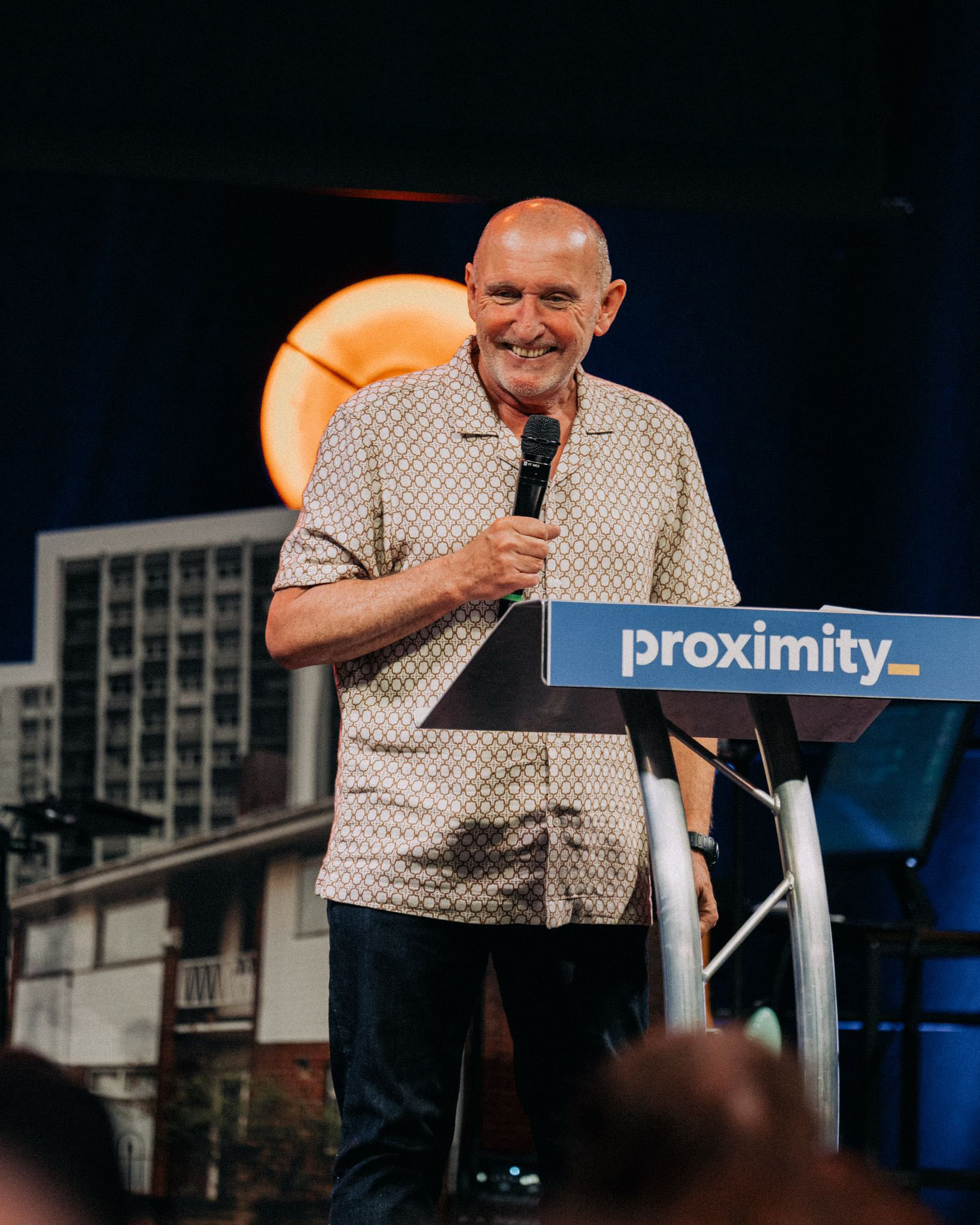
Andy Hawthorne speaking at Proximity Conference, May 2025

Andy Hawthorne, OBE is a British evangelist, author, and founder of The Message Trust, a global Christian mission organisation based in Manchester, UK.

He has been a speaker at New Wine, Spring Harvest, Soul Survivor, Keswick Convention, and other Christian conferences in the UK. He was one of the founders of Hope 08 and the Hope Together initiatives.

The Message Trust has been working with young people and communities across the UK for over 30 years; its initiatives and work have been particularly directed at those who are traditionally hard to reach, in prison, or from disadvantaged communities. Originally focused in Greater Manchester, The Message now works across the UK, with hubs in Scotland, Wales, London, the Midlands, and the North East, as well as Manchester. They also work internationally in Cape Town, South Africa, Vancouver, Canada, Annaberg-Buchholz, Germany, Brazil, the Netherlands, Uganda and Ethiopia.

== Early life ==
Hawthorne and his brother Simon were raised in Cheadle, Manchester, United Kingdom. He attended Mosley Hall Grammar School, where he was quite disruptive. After leaving school, the brothers set up a fashion accessories business in Longsight. Their mother was a Christian, but as children, they had no religious interests. Simon tells the story of receiving a Christian book from his mother, giving it away, and eventually having it returned to him by a friend of a friend in Blackpool who had found it in a charity shop. The brothers decided to read the book and then committed their lives to Jesus. Hawthorne ran the fashion accessories business for 13 years, picking up a number of skills which later proved useful when he started building a charity. An unexpected surge in demand for braces in 1987 let to him hiring 30 young men from a local estate, but they caused many problems, and in desperation, he asked local churches what they were doing to help such people. He then booked the Apollo Theatre for a week, and organised events to attract the local youth.

== Christian work ==
The brothers formed Message 88 in 1988, and Andy later co-founded the Christian band World Wide Message Tribe which had success in the UK and American pop charts. The Eden initiative was set up in Manchester in 1996.

Hawthorne is public about his Christian faith and has described it as the 'engine' of all that has been achieved through The Message Trust. On June 21, 2011, he addressed cross-bench parliamentarians at the National Prayer Breakfast at the Houses of Parliament. Invited to speak on the theme of 'Raising the aspirations of young people', he said, ‘The Bible works, and Jesus is the answer... The message of the Bible raises the aspirations of young people—we ditch it at our peril. The best of our society is built on this precious book. The more we invest in today’s young people the values that God gave us in this book, the better our society will become.’

In 2018, Hawthorne was a key figure in launching Advance 2020, a coordinated campaign by Christian ministries to deliver a major evangelistic push in the UK in 2020. Speaking about the campaign, he said, ‘I felt like we need to see a multiplication of the evangelist gift, but also in Isaiah 60 it says, "assemble my people," and I felt like we need to start going big again.’

In 2022, Hawthorne and The Message Trust partnered with the Luis Palau Association for a second time to put on Festival Manchester. Having originally held a mission in 2003, they decided to go again coming out of the Covid-19 pandemic. In the summer of 2022, Festival Manchester 2022 headed into schools, communities, ran thousands of hours of social action projects, before hosting a weekend festival in Wythenshawe Park in July. The weekend saw over 65,000 people attend.

Coming out of the first Covid 19 lockdown in 2020, Andy and The Message Trust pioneered a Community Grocery in Sharston, near Wythenshawe, giving those who were finding it hard to keep their families fed access to affordable food and wrap-around support. By April 2026, this first store had grown into a network of 38 stores across the UK that has helped put food on the table for over 80,000 member families since the first store opened. Each Community Grocery is run through a partnership between The Message Trust and a local church looking to reach their community.

Hawthorne started meeting monthly with 12 other evangelists in his office in Sharston. The twelve decided to go on and set up their own Advance Group. By 2026, Advance Groups had grown internationally and groups were meeting in more than 105 countries, and with groups meeting on every continent around the world, except Antartica.

The story of The Message is told in Hawthorne's books, The Message 20: Celebrating Two Decades of Changed Lives and Being The Message: Lessons learned on the frontline of mission.

== Awards ==
In recognition for his services to young people, Hawthorne was awarded the OBE in 2011. He was also named ‘Best Leader’ in The Sunday Times Best Not-For-Profit Organisations To Work For surveys in 2017 and 2018.

== Personal life ==
Hawthorne is married and the couple have two children, and two grandchildren. His great-grandfather was a missionary in India with the Salvation Army.

His brother Simon is the co-founder of Christian punk band, the Bill Mason Band.

== Books and publications ==
- Hawthorne, Andy (2022), A Burning Heart: Wake up, grow up, build up, The Message Trust. ISBN 978-1-9163489-5-0
- ——— (2019), Here I Am: Joining God's adventurous call to love the world, David C Cook. ISBN 978-0-8307-7653-5
- ——— et al. (2017), Being The Message: Lessons learned on the frontline of mission, The Message Trust. ISBN 978-1-9999036-0-2
- ——— (2016), Here I Am, Seek Me: More teaching from the book of Isaiah and powerful stories from The Message Trust, The Message Trust. ISBN 978-0-9571414-8-3
- ——— (2014), Here I Am, Send Me: Teaching from the book of Isaiah and powerful stories from The Message Trust, The Message Trust. ISBN 978-0957141476
- ——— Nicky Gumbel, Pete Greig, Luis Palau, Mike Pilavachi and John Sentamu (2011), The Message 20: Celebrating Two Decades of Changed Lives, The Message Trust. ISBN 978-0-9571414-0-7
- ——— (2009), Hope Unleashed, Survivor Books. ISBN 978-1-4347-6448-5
- ——— (2008), Diary of a Dangerous Vision (Revised), Survivor Books. ISBN 978-1-84291-184-6
- ——— (2005), The Smile of God, Survivor Books. ISBN 978-1-84291-236-2
- ——— (2004), Diary of a Dangerous Vision, Survivor Books. ISBN 978-1-84291-184-6
- ——— and Craig Borlase (2000), Mad for Jesus: The Vision of the World Wide Message Tribe, Hodder and Stoughton. ISBN 0-340-74563-0
- ——— and Jim Overton (1999), Get God, Zondervan. ISBN 978-0-551-03225-5
