= Where I Wanna Be (Cravin' Melon album) =

Studio album by Cravin' Melon
- Released: August 15, 1995
- Genre: Pop/Rock
- Length: 36:10
- Label: Seedless Records

Cravin' Melon chronology
Cravin' Melon (1995)	Where I Wanna Be (1995)	Red Clay Harvest (1997)

Where I Wanna Be is the first album by Cravin' Melon, released in 1995. The album was self-produced.

== Track list ==
No.	Title	Length
1.	"Pretend"	3:05
2.	"Come a Day"	3:59
3.	"Sweet Tea"	4:12
4.	"Down Without a Home"	4:29
5.	"Running"	3:33
6.	"Old Man Song"	4:13
7.	"Peace of Mind"	3:26
8.	"Post Office"	3:56
9.	"Blossom"	5:17
Total length:		36:10
