= HB (band) =

Finnish Christian symphonic metal band

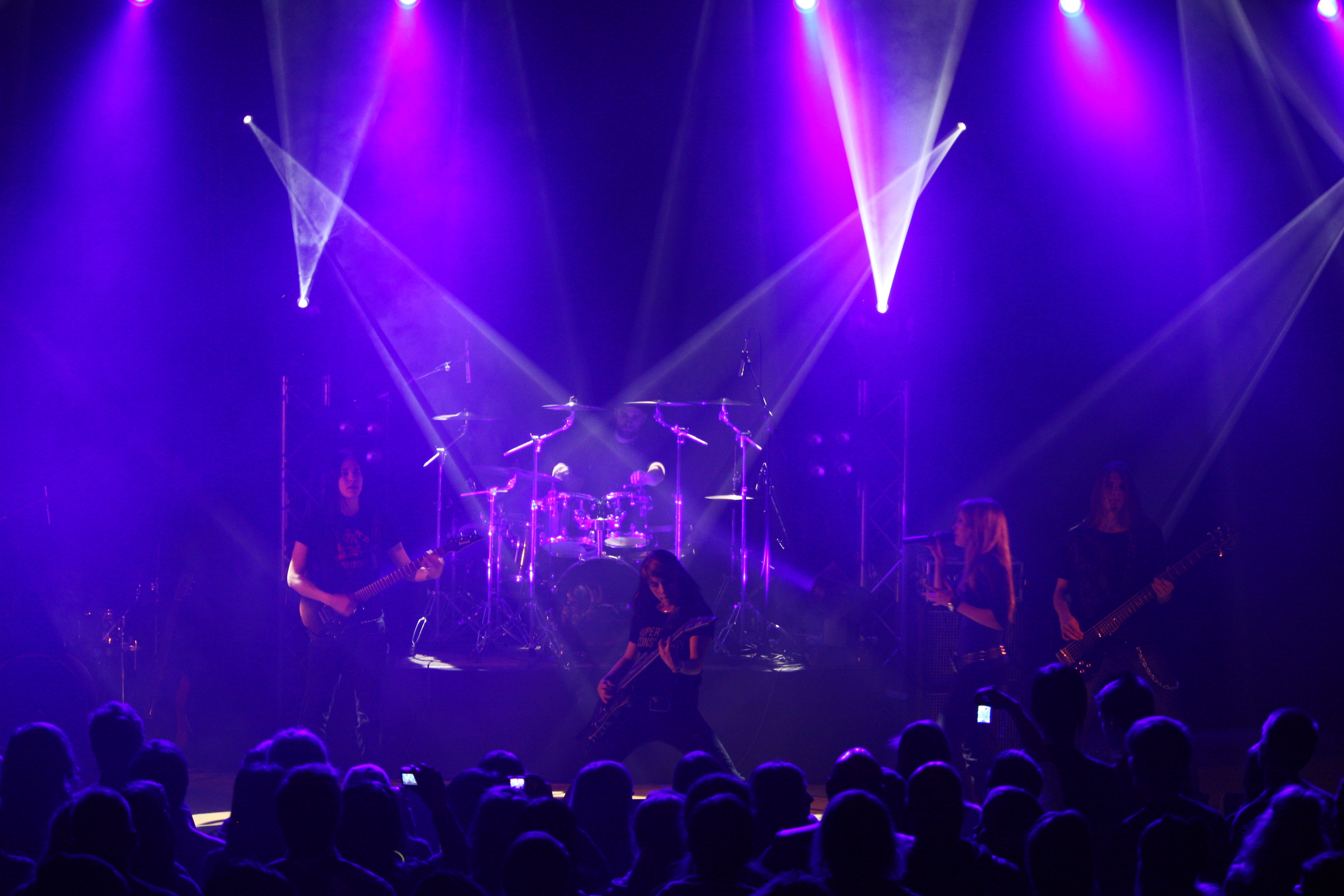
- HB live at Uusi Alku, Lempäälä, Finland 2010

Background information
- Origin: Forssa, Finland
- Genres: Christian metal, symphonic metal, power metal
- Years active: 2002–2016
- Labels: Bullroser, Data Universum, HooBee
- Members: Johanna Kultalahti (Aaltonen); Antti Niskala; Markus Malin; Tuomas Kannisto
- Website: www.hbmusic.net

HB is a Christian symphonic metal band, formed in Forssa, Finland in 2002. They recorded a demo, four albums in Finnish with English versions for three of them, three singles, and a live DVD filmed at the Maata Näkyvissä Festival (2006).

Concerning the origin and meaning of the initials HB, Johanna Kultalahti (Aaltonen) said at the official website of the band: "Actually the initials H and B don't really stand for anything. We once had a competition on our webpage, where people could suggest different meanings for the two letters. Holy Bible was one of the suggestions."

Musically the band performs symphonic metal with powerful sounds of the electric guitars, bass guitar and drums, fused with characteristic instruments of classical music, choir and even a few verses of lyric singing. The band is also characterized by the strong spiritual content in their Christ-centred lyrics.

Johanna Kultalahti (Aaltonen), the original lead vocalist, left in early 2013, to be replaced by Miia Rautkoski, who in turn announced her departure from the band in March 2014. On 3 May 2014 the band announced Johanna Aaltonen was back with HB.

On 10 December 2016 they played their farewell concert in Germany at Christmas Rock Night. They told the audience that they had decided to go their own ways in mutual agreement.

in March 2022 they released a new music video, "Praying for Europe".

== Members ==
Final line-up

- Johanna Kultalahti (Aaltonen) – vocals (2002–2013, 2014–2016)
- Antti Niskala – guitar (2002–2016)
- Markus Malin – drums (2007–2009, 2011–2016)
- Tuomas Kannisto – bass (2009–2016)

Other former members

- Keijo Kauppinen – guitar (2006–2007)
- Tuomas Mäki-Kerttula – bass (2002–2008)
- Tommi Huuskonen – bass (2008–2009)
- Janne Karhunen – guitar (2006–2009)
- Samuel Mäki-Kerttula – drums (2002–2007, 2009–2011)
- Bob Kanervo – guitar (2009–2011)
- Sofia Ylinen – guitar (2009–2011)
- Miia Rautkoski– vocals (2013–2014)

Timeline

== Discography ==
Finnish-language version			English-language version	
Title	Year	Format	Title	Year
HB 2002	2002	Demo/EP	—	
Uskon Puolesta	2004	Album	The Battle of God	2011
Turhaa Tärinää? (two-track single)	2004	CDS	—	
Enne	2005	Album	Frozen Inside	2008
Can You Road?	2006	DVD	—	
Piikki lihassa	2008	Album	Jesus Metal Explosion	2010
Perkeleitä	2010	CD	—	
Pääkallonpaikka	2010	Album	—	
—	—	CDS	"Mary" (Christmas single)	2014
