= V*Enna =

Christian musical duo

- Origin: U.S., UK
- Genres: Christian pop
- Years active: 2000–2001
- Labels: Essential
- Past members: Lucy Britten; Sharnessa Shelton
- Website: www.v-enna.com

V*Enna was a Christian pop music and dance duo made up of members Lucy Britten and Sharnessa Shelton. The group was formed by Mark Pennells and Zarc Porter previously from the World Wide Message Tribe as a response to pop stars such as Britney Spears and Jessica Simpson. V*Enna scored three singles on Christian radio: "Where I Wanna Be" (No. 6, 2000), "Do You Wanna Know?" (No. 15, 2001) and "All the Way to Heaven". Britten left before the final concerts in September 2001; they were performed by Bessie Jean Sopeland and Shelton.

== Discography ==
Where I Wanna Be

- Released: 2000
- Format: CD, Cassette
- Label: Essential
- Tracks:
  1. "Where I Wanna Be"
  2. "Make That Noize" featuring J'Marc of Raze
  3. "Do You Wanna Know?"
  4. "Sometimes"
  5. "Why Did I Let You Go?"
  6. "Sunshine and Rain"
  7. "Best Friends"
  8. "Hold On"
  9. "Don't Stop"
  10. "All the Way to Heaven"
  11. "Don't Get Left Behind"
  12. "Make That Noize (Init Remix)" UK Bonus Track

All the Way to Heaven EP

- Released: 2000
- Format: CD
- Label: Essential
- Tracks:
  1. "All the Way to Heaven" (Radio Mix)
  2. "All the Way to Heaven" (AC Radio Mix)
  3. "All the Way to Heaven" (European AC Mix)

Where I Wanna Be EP

- Released: 2000
- Format: CD
- Label: Essential
- Tracks:
  1. "Where I Wanna Be" (Radio Pop Mix)
  2. "Where I Wanna Be" (Pure Pop Mix)
  3. "Where I Wanna Be" (Light Pop Mix)

All the Way to Heaven (Enhanced Maxi-single)

- Released: 2000
- Format: CD
- Label: Essential
- Tracks:
  1. "All the Way to Heaven"
  2. "Sunshine and Rain"
  3. "All the Way to Heaven" (Urban Mix)
  4. "Sunshine and Rain" (Interchangeable Mix)
  5. "All the Way to Heaven" (Supertap Mix)
  6. "All the Way to Heaven" (Bonus Karaoke track)
  7. "Sunshine and Rain" (Bonus Karaoke track)
  8. "Meet V*Enna" video

=== Singles ===
- 2000 "All the Way to Heaven" (Essential)
- 2000 "Where I Wanna Be" (Essential)
- 2001 "Do You Wanna Know?" (Essential)

=== Contributions ===
- 2000 "O Come All Ye Faithful" on Essential Energy Christmas
- 2000 "Do You Wanna Know? (live)" on Celebrate Freedom Live
- 2000 "All the Way to Heaven" on Left Behind: The Movie OST
- 2001 "Where I Wanna Be" on WOW Hits 2001
- 2006 "Where I Wanna Be" and "Why Did I Let You Go" & "Sometimes" on The Best of Movation
