= David Gomér =

Swedish politician

David Gomér (1897–1977) was a Swedish politician. He was a member of the Centre Party.
