= TBC (group) =

English Christian band

- Origin: Manchester, England
- Genres: Christian music, dance, pop
- Years active: 2004–present
- Label: ICC / Spring Harvest
- Members: Lucy-Jayne Wells; Rachel Holmes; Megan Howard; Bethan Ellis
- Past members: Natalie Joy Potgieter; Shell Perris; Liz Roberts-Fraser; Laura Moseley
- Website: www.tbcmusic.com

TBC (styled as tbc) are a Christian girl group who were launched by Innervation Trust in 2004, as a "flagship" girl band alongside their brother band Thebandwithnoname. Innervation Trust is a Christian charity that exists to recruit and resource schools teams, dubbed "Collectives", each dedicated to a major city in the UK. Innervation Trust is the product of Mark Pennells and Zarc Porter, a songwriter/producer partnership also credited with writing most of the music for, and co-founding, the World Wide Message Tribe. After 7 years of promoting the Collective bands throughout every region of the UK, they were replaced by the primary school project, Pop Connection. This has since been replaced by iSingPOP. iSingPOP works in primary schools and will spend a week teaching all the children a number of songs (usually 7) as a choir and the next week will perform these songs in their local church or activity hall/centre with an audience. They also have a recording day to make their own album.

== Name ==
As an advertising device to raise the profile of the band at its launch, Innervation opened a competition for fans to give the band a name. Fans were invited to vote via the internet for a new name, and the most popular ones were placed in a shortlist from which fans could vote for their favourite. However, the band decided, that alongside brother band Thebandwithnoname and with the help of around 80% of the votes, they decided to keep band name TBC in other words "Touring Band Collective". Shortly after the Collective work had ended, the girls refer to TBC as "To Be Continued", as to whatever the situation concerning new band members, the girls will try to continue doing work for God.

== Debut album ==
TBC's debut album TBC, produced by Zarc Porter, was released in 2005. TBC were then a four-piece group, the members being Shell Perris, Natalie Joy Potgieter, Liz Roberts-Parry and Laura Moseley. The TBC self-titled album sold more than expected, due to the girls touring so much. The album also received a 10/10 review from popular Christian radio station, Cross Rhythms. Giving the girls high hopes for the future and catching something different in the Christian music market. This album had high energy pop, with an r'n'b influence throughout most of the tracks, including the rocky track, "Do You Know What It's Like?" and a contrast to a more WWMT past sound of "When I Get To Heaven". These two songs both had good reviews and also had music videos. Sugababes and the early Girls Aloud have been linked with this sound. The music of TBC became well known at Spring Harvest, popular Christian music festival and New Wine. Also expect some vocals by now solo artist/author, Shell Perris, in TBC hoody feature, "Loved".

== Interim line-up ==
In 2006, the band announced a new line-up. Liz Roberts-Parry and Laura Mosely along with now Christian rock chick solo artist Shell Perris left the band. Natalie Joy Potgieter, a singer and dancer from Essex, remained along with three new members: Lucy-Jayne Wells, a dancer and singer from Tyrone – Atlanta, Georgia (USA); Megan Howard a singer and dancer from Essex; and Rachel Holmes a dancer, rapper and singer from Manchester. A new album was set to release with a tour leading up to an album launch at the Manchester Apollo. It was decided that TBC would change their image. From doing secondary school work to Primary school. This meant their style and genre of music was to change from the more cranky r'n'b to primary school pop, only in relation to past groups such as Steps, S Club 7, S Club Juniors, or a slightly more party style Girls Aloud.

== Talk of the Town ==
Talk of the Town was the band's second album, and launched the band further into the Christian music scene. The album received very positive reviews, mostly towards the work in which the girls were doing. Natalie Joy Potgieter had cut her hair from long and red to short and blonde. People warmed to the new line-up. All went smoothly as they launched their new album Talk of the Town at the Manchester Apollo. The crowd was a wide age range. This seemed like a popular new audience for the all new style TBC. The performance included special guests, Thebandwithnoname and support from the "Pop Connection Touring Choir". The title track "Talk of the Town" alongside "Faithful", "Nobody Loves Me Like You Do" and "One Summer's Day" have a genre similar to The Beatles and rock chick musical Grease. Whereas their other song, with music video, "We'll Keep on Dancing", was a contrast in pop, sounding similar to the likes of "Saturday Night Fever". Popular with the older TBC audience is the only r'n'b flavoured track "I Will Always Love You". Production crafted by producers in work with the Sugababes and resembling Shayne Ward. Also ending the Talk of the Town album with an almost-lullaby resemblance gives you "Goodnight" featuring the Pop Connection touring Choir. The title song "Talk of the Town" received the most airplay.

== Touring ==
The girls have been touring up and down the UK since before and after their album launch. They also visit primary schools, which has been popular. The TBC girls toured South Africa successfully and also did an American tour in January 2009 visiting primary schools, taking lessons, dance workshops and church events.

== New line-up ==
In April 2009, after nearly five years of work in TBC/Innervation Trust, it was time for Natalie Joy Potgieter to leave the band to move to South Africa with her husband. TBC were then a three-girl band and have been searching for a new member. They carried on touring at such events, Spring Harvest, QuobFest, and New Wine music festivals. Also continuing to do primary school work. In October 2009, Megan Howard left the group but continued with the band's main gigs until they find someone else.

== New album ==
There have been rumours of a new album by TBC with a more up-to-date image. Since working with primary school, the TBC girls and their team at Innervation have understood the pop music that young children are listening to and are heading towards the sounds of the new dance hip/pop sound.
