= The Electrics =

Scottish Celtic rock band

- Origin: Dumbarton, Scotland
- Genres: Celtic rock, Christian rock
- Years active: 1988–present
- Labels: Word; Pila; 5 Minute Walk; Pleitegeier
- Members: Sammy Horner; Paul Baird; Davie McArthur; Allan Hewitt
- Past members: Tim Cotterell; Jim Cosgrove; Jim Devlin; Heather Negus; Kris McEwan; David Lyon; Kenny MacNicol; Robin Callander
- Website: www.theelectrics.com

The Electrics are a Celtic rock band from Dumbarton, Scotland. They formed in 1988 when former Infrapenny members Sammy Horner (vocals and bass guitar) and Paul Baird (guitar) asked drummer Dave McArthur and sax/keyboard player Allan Hewitt to play a gig at Glasgow's Impact Festival. The band released a self-financed cassette album, Views in Blues, in 1989. Following this recording the band evolved a Celtic rock sound, heavily influenced by the Waterboys and the Pogues. Subsequent recordings included Vision and Dreams (1990) which was distributed by Word Records, and Big Silent World (1993), on Germany's Pila Music label.

The band has performed in the UK, Europe and the US and has never officially disbanded.

Sam Horner has returned to live in Ireland once again, and spends much of the year touring the world performing concerts with his wife, Kylie Horner, as the Sweet Sorrows.

== Band members ==
Current members

- Sammy Horner — lead vocals, bass
- Paul Baird — guitar and backing vocals
- Davie McArthur — drums, bodhrán
- Allan Hewitt — keyboards, accordion, saxophone, whistle and backing vocals
- Tim Cotterell — fiddle, mandolin

Former members

- Jim Devlin — guitar, mandolin
- Jim Cosgrove — drums
- Heather Negus — accordion, keyboards
- Kris McEwan — fiddle, mandolin
- David Lyon — accordion, keyboards
- Kenny MacNicol — highland pipes, uilleann pipes, whistles
- Robin Callander — fiddle, mandolin

== Discography ==
- 1991: Visions and Dreams (Review: Cross Rhythms)
- 1993: Big Silent World
- 1995: The Whole Shebang!
- 1997: The Electrics (Reviews: Cross Rhythms, The Phantom Tollbooth)
- 1998: Livin' It Up When I Die (Review: Cross Rhythms, The Phantom Tollbooth, HM Magazine)
- 1999: Danger Live (Review: The Phantom Tollbooth
- 2001: Reel, Folk'n'Rock'n'Roll (Review: Cross Rhythms)
- 2005: Old, New, Borrowed & Green (Review: Cross Rhythms)
- 2014: The Norway Sessions (recorded 2005, released as a digital album on Bandcamp almost 10 years later)
- 2024: Big Pub in the Sky (recorded 2023)

Samples

- Grass is greener
- Rolling Home
