= Thebandwithnoname =

British Christian band

thebandwithnoname
- Also known as: tbwnn
- Origin: Manchester, UK
- Genres: Christian hip hop, Christian EDM, Christian rock, Christian metal, nu metal, grime, crunk rock
- Years active: 2002–2010
- Labels: ICC, Spring Harvest
- Past members: Chip Kendall (Chip K); Leon Henderson (QKid); David Strafford (Straff); Jonathan Moore (J); Adam Brown (Presha); Bobby Joel Stearns (The Bobsta); James Adams (Jimmy)

thebandwithnoname (referred to as "TBWNN" by fans) were a Christian band who were launched by Innervation Trust in March 2002, as their flagship band, alongside girl band TBC. TBWNN hosted their final gig at the Stockport Plaza on Saturday 4 September 2010 and have since disbanded.

== Trust background ==
Innervation Trust is a Christian charity that recruits and resources school teams, each dedicated to a major city in the UK. Innervation Trust is the product of Mark Pennells and Zarc Porter, a songwriter/producer partnership also credited with writing most of the music for, and co-founding, the World Wide Message Tribe.

== Name ==
To raise the profile of the band at its launch, Innervation opened a competition for fans to give the band a name. Fans were invited to vote via the internet for a new name, and the most popular ones were placed in a shortlist from which fans could vote for their favourite. However, the band had already released a single ("Take Up the Tempo", which would also appear on their first album The Blitz), and performed a high-profile launch concert at Soul Survivor 2002 under the name "thebandwithnoname". Fan response was in favour of the name being retained.

== The Blitz ==
thebandwithnoname's debut album The Blitz, produced by Zarc Porter, was released almost as soon as the band's lineup was finalised. thebandwithnoname were then a three-piece group, the members being Adam Brown (known as Presha while with thebandwithnoname; now goes by Ad-apt); Bobby Joel Stearns (known as The Bobsta) and Chip Kendall (known in thebandwithnoname as chipK). The Blitz Tour took place in 2002/2003, a 60-date tour to promote this album, and also featured Doug Walker (Manchester-based singer/songwriter) as a support act. Bobby Joel Stearns was later one-third of electrosoul outfit Unklejam. Adam Brown features on the first single release of another one of Innervation's project's, Bebe Vox. They released, a single, "Take Up the Tempo", to promote the album.

=== The Blitz track listing ===
1. "The Blitz" - 3:47
2. "Faster" - 3:41
3. "Amazing Grace" - 3:44
4. "TTWIMTB" - 3:28
5. "Radio Fresh" (Interlude) - 0:30
6. "Take Up The Tempo" - 3:23
7. "Ramp" (Interlude) - 1:03
8. "Will You Ever?" - 4:42
9. "Get Up" - 3:03
10. "Guilty" (Interlude) - 0:19
11. "Without You Within Me" - 4:16
12. "Now" - 2:51
13. "Hal-Le-Lu-Jah" - 4:45
14. "The Blitz" Remix – Savalas - 6:44
15. "Take Up The Tempo" (Underburner Remix) – Zarc Porter - 6:15

== Schizophrenix ==
Schizophrenix cover

Schizophrenix was the band's second album. Released on 15 December 2003, it launched the band further into the Christian music scene. The album received very positive reviews. However, Bobby Stearns, and later Adam Brown, left the group shortly after the release of Schizophrenix to pursue individual careers. A long period of reduced activity followed for the band, with Zulu Yengwa (a rapper) and Joshua Philip Oluwadare Morohumobo Kofi Alamu (a singer known simply as "Josh" whilst appearing with thebandwithnoname) occasionally featuring alongside the only remaining original member of the group, chipK. For some time Innervation failed to recruit any new members for the group. During this time, thebandwithnoname added dancers, Tina Mann and Helen Kendall (chipK's wife) and went on a 2 1/2-month tour of the US. The tour was organized by Tom Miyashiro of Faith 2 Faith Ministries International, who by the end of the tour helped recruit and send American musicianaries to the UK to work in Innervation's bands. Tom released a book in 2006 entitled, "Schizophrenic" as a complement to the Schizophrenix album.

=== Schizophrenix track listing ===
1. "Drive" - 4:37
2. "Found and Lost" - 4:16
3. "Tell Me Something I Don't Know Already" - 3:58
4. "Before The Throne" - 3:33
5. "Schizophrenic Skin" - 4:07
6. "Prophecy" - 0:40
7. "The Best Thing" - 3:59
8. "Reveal" - 3:53
9. "Everybody's Free (To Feel Good)" - 4:25
10. "Beatbox" - 0:47
11. "Heavy" - 3:12
12. "Home" - 5:01
13. "Tell Me Something" (Kubiks and Bcee Remix) - 4:57
14. "Amazing Grace" (Intreid Remix) - 12:08

== Interim lineup ==
At the end of 2005, thebandwithnoname announced a new lineup. chipK remained along with three new members: Leon Henderson, stage name Q Kid, a rapper from Milton Keynes; Jonathan Moore, stage name J, a dancer and singer from London; and David Strafford, stage name Straff, a singer from Kent. The Innervation Winter Tour 2005 premiered this new lineup, a 13-date tour across the UK. American musicianaries Carissa Jardio (who later married Zulu from the second tbwnn lineup) and Kylie Evans (2006) were added to the band as back up dancers alongside Tina and Helen. They released, another single, "Justified/Pull Up the Vinyl", to showcase their new hip hop sound.

== Dying to Be There ==
The band's third album, Dying to Be There, was released on 23 February 2007, and has garnered extremely positive reviews including a 10 square review from Cross Rhythms. Thanks to a record company systems failure, several copies were sent to Christian bookshops early and sold well before the release date. In addition the album was sold in the US by the band, before the album was released in the UK. The album won two Album Of The Year awards in the UK and the first song on the album "Do Or Die" was the most played song of 2007 on the UK's CR Radio. They band released, a reissued album, Dying to be There, with a bonus DVD.

== New lineup ==
In late 2008 Jonathan Moore (stage name "J") left the band in order to work on other projects. From around 2008 a live band began playing alongside Chip, Straff and Leon. Session drummer Tom Pearson (stage name "Kuvey") and guitarist James Adams (stage name "Jimmy") began performing on stage with them. Leon also spent time DJing as well as rapping. Jimmy's last performance with the band was at Greenbelt 2009. He was replaced by new guitarist Joel Atkins, who played alongside Kuvey until the band's finish in September 2010.

== The4Points/The Best of thebandwithnoname ==
The band's fourth, and final, album, The4Points/The Best of thebandwithnoname, was released on 19 February 2010 and received a 10 square review from Cross Rhythms. The album contains the best songs from all three albums but also contains 3 new songs titled "the4points", "Heroes Fall" and "Space Cadet". "The4Points" track features LZ7 along with The Pop Connection Choir, Love and Joy Gospel Choir, Sanctified Gospel Choir, tbc, Shell Perris, Blush UK, 12:24 and 4 Kornerz. During 2009/2010 the band went on their final tour "The Four Points Tour" with full live band, all over the UK and abroad. This tour lead up to their final gig in the Stockport Plaza, on 4 September 2010. During the final gig, Chip, Straff and Leon were joined by previous members Presha (Ad- Apt) and Jimmy (Previous Guitarist), for a few songs during the set.

== theshowwithnoname ==
Chip Kendall and David Strafford hosted a weekly podcast "theshowwithnoname", which included music from the band and other Christian artists. The show also included "Precha Man", which was Chip Kendall talking on a section from the bible, or from a Christian devotion book. As well as this a section called "People Clips" included phonecall or studio interviews with various people in Christian ministry. "The Rath of Straff" was a section dedicated to Christian "Hardcore" music. The show also included randomly themed intros and outros recorded by Chip and Straff.
