= The Tribe (dance band) =

British Christian dance band

- Also known as: World Wide Message Tribe
- Origin: Manchester, England
- Genres: CCM, CEDM, Christian hip hop
- Years active: 1991–2004
- Labels: N'Soul/Diamante, Warner Bros., Resolve/Diamante
- Past members: Andy Hawthorne; Mark Pennells; Zarc Porter; Elaine Hanley; Sani; Beth Vickers Redman; Cameron Danté; Deronda K Lewis; Colette Smethurst; Claire Prosser; Emma Owen; Tim Owen; Lindz West; Jhorge Mhondera; Quintin Delport

The Tribe, formerly the World Wide Message Tribe (WWMT), were a British Christian dance band. Their aim was "to communicate the gospel to young people in Greater Manchester". They were part of the Christian charity, The Message Trust, in Manchester.

== Background ==
The World Wide Message Tribe formed in 1991, and grew out of an evangelistic project called "Message to Schools" run by fashion designer Andy Hawthorne and singer Mark Pennells. The Tribe disbanded in 2004.

The line up of the Tribe varied over the 13 years and included many recognised Christian artists including Andy Hawthorne (director of the message), Mark Pennells (co-director of Innervation trust), Zarc Porter (also co-director of Innervation Trust as well as producer and co-writer for most of the Tribe's musical output), Elaine Hanley, Lorraine Williams, Sani, Beth Redman (internationally known artist and author and wife of Matt Redman; she was later in a band called Storm which released an eponymous album in 1998.), Cameron Danté (formerly of Bizarre Inc), Deronda K Lewis, Colette Smethurst, Claire Prosser, Emma and Tim Owen, Lindz West, Jorge Mhondera and Quintin Delport (Jorge and Quintin were formally members of SA band, M.I.C. and have now set up a new bands known as Whistlejacket and Shackleton respectively).

The Tribe's parent organisation, The Message Trust, has since created multiple bands, including BlushUK (a girl group), LZ7, a hip hop group fronted by ex-Tribe member Lindz West, and Twelve24, another hip hop group. "Genetik", the tribe academy has been set up with the vision to train up young evangelists in an Urban or Creative course at its Manchester base. Mark Pennells and Zarc Porter have also continued to develop evangelistic bands and projects as part of the Innervation Trust including Shinemk, V*enna, thebandwithnoname, tbc, BeBe Vox, iSingPOP and iSingWorship.

The group won three GMA Dove Awards.

== Discography ==
- WWMT – Take A Long Hike With The Chosen Few (N*Soul/Diamante, 1993) – N*Soul's first CD
- WWMT – Dance Planet (N*Soul/Diamante, 1994) – Compilation, #1 radio hits:”On My Way to Zion”, “Where Are You Going” & “Peace”
- WWMT – Jumping in the House of God (Warner Alliance, 1998)
- WWMT – We Don't Get What We Deserve (Warner Alliance, 1996),#1 Radio Hit, “Sweet Salvation”
- Jumping in the House of God II (Alliance, 1998) – Various artists
- WWMT – Revived (Warner Alliance, 1999) – Compilation
- WWMT – Heatseeker (Warner Resound, 1997)
- Jumping in the House of God III (Alliance, 1998) – Various artists, #1 Radio Hits,”The Real Thing”, “Jumping in the House of God”
- WWMT – Frantik (Resolve/Diamante, 1999)
- The Tribe – Take Back The Beat (Alliance, 2001) – Three track/video cd-rom
- The Tribe – Raise Your Game (Authentic, 2003)
- The Tribe – Message to the Masses (2004) – Compilation

=== Singles ===
Year	Song	Album	Billboard Chart	Position
1996	"The Real Thing"	Jumping in the House of God	Hot Dance Music/Club Play	22
