= Ultimate Collection (Matt Redman album) =

Studio album by Matt Redman
- Released: 20 April 2010
- Genres: CCM, worship
- Label: Kingsway Music

Matt Redman chronology
We Shall Not Be Shaken (2009)	Ultimate Collection (2010)	10,000 Reasons (2011)

Ultimate Collection is the compilation by worship leader Matt Redman which features songs from his studio and live albums.

== Track listing ==
Album release
No.	Title	Writer(s)	Originally recorded on	Length
1.	"You Never Let Go"	B. Redman, M. Redman	Beautiful News	4:43
2.	"Blessed Be Your Name"	Beth Redman, Matt Redman	Where Angels Fear to Tread	4:39
3.	"Once Again"	M. Redman	The Friendship and the Fear	4:52
4.	"Nothing But the Blood"	Robert Lowry, M. Redman	Facedown	6:28
5.	"Dancing Generation"	M. Redman	Facedown	5:05
6.	"Shine"	M. Redman	Beautiful News	5:00
7.	"The Heart of Worship"	M. Redman	Intimacy	5:21
8.	"Facedown"	B. Redman, M. Redman	Facedown	5:31
9.	"Let Everything That Has Breath"	M. Redman	Intimacy	4:25
10.	"Lord Let Your Glory Fall"	M. Redman	Where Angels Fear to Tread	4:43
11.	"I Will Offer Up My Life"	M. Redman	Passion for Your Name	5:00
12.	"Better Is One Day" (featuring Charlie Hall)	M. Redman	Passion for Your Name	5:15
13.	"The Father's Song"	M. Redman	The Father's Song	4:18
14.	"Yes and Amen"	Josiah Bell, Robert Marvin, M. Redman	Beautiful News	6:18
Total length:				71:38
