= Blessed Be Your Name: The Songs of Matt Redman Vol. 1 =

Blessed Be Your Name: The Songs Of Matt Redman Vol. 1

Studio album by Matt Redman
- Released: 19 July 2005
- Recorded: Atlanta, Georgia
- Genre: Worship
- Length: 59:34
- Label: Survivor
- Producer: Nathan Nockels

Matt Redman chronology
Facedown (2004)	Blessed Be Your Name: The Songs Of Matt Redman Vol. 1 (2005)	Beautiful News (2006)

Professional ratings
Review scores
Source	Rating
Jesus Freak Hideout	4/5 stars

Blessed Be Your Name: The Songs of Matt Redman Vol. 1 is an album by worship artist Matt Redman released in 2005. It is a live re-recording of some of Redman's best known songs. It was recorded during the Facedown: Conference for Songwriters which was held 28 to 30 January 2004, at North Point Community Church in Alpharetta, Georgia. Redman recorded enough material at the 2004 conference to release a live album in 2004 (Facedown) that was focused on newly written songs plus a second retrospective album in 2005 (Blessed Be Your Name). One song, "Facedown", appears in both albums, however producer Nathan Nockels recorded numerous overdubs on the Blessed Be Your Name version as he did with numerous other tracks on the album, adding in percussion, string orchestra parts (overdubbed in Prague by the National Opera Orchestra) and additional background vocals.

The album was mainly recorded at one location: North Point Community Church, Alpharetta, Georgia with Tom Laune acting as the engineer. Overdubs were recorded by producer Nathan Nockels at Berwick Lane, Franklin, Tennessee, Esseille Studios, Brighton, England and by Chris Freels at West 2nd Recording, Oklahoma City, Oklahoma.

== Track listing ==
Album release
No.	Title	Original studio recording on	Length
1.	"Blessed Be Your Name"	Where Angels Fear to Tread	5:48
2.	"Holy Moment"	The Father's Song	4:42
3.	"Once Again"	The Friendship and the Fear	4:58
4.	"The Heart of Worship"	Intimacy	6:27
5.	"Let My Words Be Few"	The Father's Song	4:08
6.	"Lord, Let Your Glory Fall"	Where Angels Fear to Tread	4:46
7.	"Undignified"		4:07
8.	"Better Is One Day" (featuring Charlie Hall)	Passion for Your Name	5:06
9.	"Facedown"	Facedown	5:35
10.	"I Will Offer Up My Life"	Passion for Your Name	5:07
11.	"Let Everything That Has Breath"	Intimacy	4:43
12.	"The Father's Song"	The Father's Song	4:07
Total length:			62:04

=== Bonus items extended CD ===
"Heart of Worship" video from Atlanta Matt Redman interview

== Personnel ==
Band

- Matt Redman – lead vocals, acoustic guitars
- Andrew Philip – keyboards
- Nathan Nockels – acoustic piano, Wurlitzer electric piano, Hammond B3 organ
- John Ellis – electric guitars
- Jonathan Ahrens – bass
- Terl Bryant – drums, percussion
- Matt King – drums, percussion
- David Raven – drums, percussion
- Christy Nockels – backing vocals
- Lex Buckley – backing vocals

Additional musicians

- Nathan Nockels – keyboards, programming, acoustic guitars, electric guitars, backing vocals
- Gary Burnette – electric guitars
- Pat Malone – bass
- Charlie Hall – vocals (on "Better Is One Day")
- Keith Getty – string arrangements

=== Production ===
- Louie Giglio – executive producer
- Les Moir – executive producer
- Nathan Nockels – producer, overdub recording
- Tom Laune – recording, mixing
- Chris Freels – overdub recording
- Aaron Hawthorne – assistant engineer
- Stephen Lotz – assistant engineer
- Lee Bridges – digital editing
- Richard Dodd – mastering
- Simon Ward – production manager
- Jan Cook – creative director

== Release details ==
- 2005, UK, Survivor Records SURCD5026, Release Date 19 July 2005, CD

== Awards ==
The album was nominated for a Dove Award for Praise & Worship Album of the Year at the 37th GMA Dove Awards.
