= 10,000 Reasons =

10,000 Reasons may refer to:

- 10,000 Reasons (album), 2013 Christian album by Matt Redman
- 10,000 Reasons (book), 2016, by Matt Redman
- "10,000 Reasons (Bless the Lord)", 2011 song co-written in by Matt Redman and Jonas Myrin
