= Unbroken Praise =

Studio album by Matt Redman
- Released: 15 June 2015
- Recorded: Abbey Road Studios
- Genre: CCM, worship
- Length: 57:59
- Label: sixsteps
- Producer: Nathan Nockels

Matt Redman chronology
Your Grace Finds Me (2013)	Unbroken Praise (2015)	These Christmas Lights (2016)

Unbroken Praise: At Abbey Road Studios is the ninth studio album and twelfth album overall from Matt Redman. sixsteps Records released the album on 15 June 2015.

== Critical reception ==
Professional ratings
Review scores
Source	Rating
CCM Magazine	4/5 stars
Christian Music Review	4.2/5
Cross Rhythms	10/10 squares
Louder Than the Music	5/5 stars
New Release Today	4.5/5 stars
Worship Leader	4/5 stars

Matt Conner, giving the album four stars by CCM Magazine, describes, "While the totality of it lacks any specific theme or direction, it is a solid set of eleven vertical songs that stand on their own." Awarding the album four and a half stars from New Release Today, Kevin Davis states, "These are very passionate worship songs." DeWayne Hamby, reviewing the album for Charisma, writes, "Unbroken Praise...brings 11 new sing-able tracks ready to be used for corporate and personal worship...The worship experience captured there features the singer-songwriter at his best, offering an engaging musical production that merges high-energy worship and heartfelt, memorable praise."

Jonathan Harris, rating the album a ten out of ten for Cross Rhythms, writes, "a superb album." Indicating in a four star review at Worship Leader, Jeremy Armstrong states, "Redman's Skill as a prayer-poet is clearly evident in Unbroken Praise—depending on the spiritual/emotional state of your community, you will find songs that will resonate." Giving the album a 4.2 out of five at Christian Music Review, Laura Chambers says, "Unbroken Praise transports us to a moment in time where God stirred the atmosphere and inspired hearts to glorify Him. Jono Davies, awarding the album five stars by Louder Than the Music, describes, "This isn't just another Matt Redman album, this album has songs that hit your heart with such strength that you will not be the same after you hear them. God does something amazing in these songs."

== Awards and accolades ==
This album was No. 8, on the Worship Leader's Top 20 Albums of 2015 list.

The song, "Unbroken Praise", was No. 4, on the Worship Leader's Top 20 Songs of 2015 list.

== Track listing ==
No.	Title	Writer(s)	Length
1.	"Louder"	Matt Redman, Jason Ingram, Jonas Myrin	4:01
2.	"It Is Well with My Soul"	M. Redman, Beth Redman	5:57
3.	"Flames"	M. Redman, Myrin, Ingram	5:09
4.	"Unbroken Praise"	M. Redman, Myrin	5:12
5.	"Abide with Me"	Matt Maher, M. Redman, Ingram, David Crowder	5:20
6.	"King of My Soul"	M. Redman, Willie Weeks, Myrin, Jorge Mhondera	4:00
7.	"Songs in the Night"	M. Redman, Myrin, Ingram	5:48
8.	"No One Like Our God"	Myrin, M. Redman, Ed Cash	6:08
9.	"The Awesome God You Are"	M. Redman, Ingram, Cash	4:57
10.	"No Longer I"	Ian Yates, M. Redman, Sam Blake	6:25
11.	"Majesty of the Most High"	M. Redman, Myrin, Chris Tomlin	5:02
Total length:			57:59

== Personnel ==
- Matt Redman – lead vocals, acoustic guitar
- Nathan Nockels – keyboards, programming, guitars, vocals
- Jimmy James – extra programming (1–3)
- Mark Suhonen – extra programming (2)
- Willie Weeks – extra programming (2, 3, 5–7, 10, 11)
- Bryan Brown – guitars, vocals
- James Duke – guitars
- Jon Duke – bass
- Jacob Arnold – drums
- Abimaro – backing vocals
- Philly Lopez – backing vocals
- Jorge Mhondera – backing vocals
- Hope Plumb – backing vocals

String section

- Huw White – string arrangements and coordinator
- Catherine Lee – cello
- Georgie Harris – viola
- Tansy Garrod, Elspeth Hanson, Ramona Racovicean and Sean Riley – violin

=== Production ===
- Louie Giglio – executive producer
- Shelley Giglio – executive producer, art direction, management
- Brad O'Donnell – executive producer
- Nathan Nockels – producer
- Jim Dineen – sound recording engineer
- Stephen Bailey – live sound engineer
- Mark Sunderland – monitor engineer
- Luke Fellingham – vocal engineer for demos at Luna Sound (Brighton, UK)
- Daniel James – string engineer, editing
- Ainslie Grosser – mixing
- Stephen Marcussen – mastering at Marcussen Mastering (Hollywood, California, USA)
- Josef Mirakovits – technical assistant, guitar technician
- Ed White – lighting design
- Richard Rhys Thomas – lights
- Andy Hutch – video
- Bekah Harmer – live event lyric projection
- Tom Redman – production coordinator, tour manager
- Ian Cattle – production manager
- Leighton Ching – art direction, design
- Mike McCloskey – art direction, management
- Kendra Harrell – design
- Hazel Thompson – artist photography, live event photography
- Ed Peers – live event photography

== Chart performance ==
Chart (2015)	Peak position
UK Albums (OCC)	58
US Billboard 200	50
US Top Christian Albums (Billboard)	1
