= Veritas (disambiguation) =

Veritas was the Roman goddess of truth, and is the Latin word for "truth".

Veritas may also refer to:

== Media ==
=== Books ===
- Veritas (manhwa), written by Kim Dong-hoon and illustrated by Yoon Joon-shik
- Veritas, a historical novel by Monaldi & Sorti
- "Veritas", a 2002 short story by Robert Reed

=== Music ===
- Veritas (band), an American classical vocal group
- Veritas (Agnes album), 2012
- Veritas (Gary Hughes album) or the title song, 2007
- Veritas (Veritas album), 2014
- Veritas (P.O.D. album), 2024
- Veritas, an album by the Alex Skolnick Trio, 2011
- "Veritas", a song by Bloodred Hourglass, 2021

=== Film, television, and audio ===
- "Veritas" (Castle)
- "Veritas" (CSI: NY)
- "Veritas" (Sanctuary)
- "Veritas" (Smallville)
- "Veritas" (Star Trek: Lower Decks)
- Veritas, Prince of Truth, a 2007 film
- Veritas: The Quest, a 2003 American television series
- Veritas, a text in the Doctor Who episode "Extremis"
- Veritas, a character in the Sarah Jane Adventures audio story "Judgement Day"

== Organisations and corporations ==
- Veritas (automobile), German post-WW2 sports and racing car manufacturer
- Veritas (political party), a defunct British political party
- Bureau Veritas, an international certification agency
- Det Norske Veritas, a standards organization for maritime construction
- Project Veritas, U.S. far-right activist group
- Veritas Academy, Florida
- Veritas Academy (Austin, Texas)
- Veritas AG, a German corporation of automotive parts, based in Gelnhausen, Germany
- Veritas Capital, a New York-based private-equity firm
- Veritas Communications, publishing company of the Irish Catholic Bishops' Conference
- Veritas Forum, Christian organization
- Veritas Technologies, a software corporation
- Veritas Tools, a Canadian manufacturer of woodworking tools
- Veritas, publishing company of the Australian League of Rights
- Veritas of Washington, a consulting company in Washington, D.C., that once managed United Medical Center

== Science and technology ==
- 490 Veritas, an asteroid
- VERITAS, a high-energy astrophysics telescope in southern Arizona
- VERITAS (spacecraft), a planned spacecraft mission to Venus
- Veritas File System, for storing and organizing digital data

== Other uses ==
- DZRV-AM, a Catholic AM radio station in Metro Manila, Philippines known as Radyo Veritas 846
- Radio Veritas, a shortwave Catholic station broadcasting in Asia
- Veritas (Scots law), a defense to defamation under Scots law
- Veritas Stadion, a football stadium in Turku, Finland
- Operation Veritas, 2001 UK military operations against the Taliban government of Afghanistan
