= We Shall Not Be Shaken =

Studio album by Matt Redman
- Released: 25 August 2009
- Studio: Platinum Lab Recording and Dutchland Studios (Nashville, Tennessee); Berwick Lane (Atlanta, Georgia)
- Genre: CCM, worship
- Label: Sparrow/sixsteps
- Producer: Robert Marvin

Matt Redman chronology
Beautiful News (2006)	We Shall Not Be Shaken (2009)	Ultimate Collection (2010)

Professional ratings
Review scores
Source	Rating
Christianity Today	4.5/5 stars
Jesus Freak Hideout	4.5/5 stars

We Shall Not Be Shaken is Matt Redman's critically acclaimed seventh studio album. It was released in the US on 25 August 2009 and in Europe on 4 September 2009.

== Track listing ==
Album release
No.	Title	Writer(s)	Length
1.	"This is How We Know"	Matt Redman, Beth Redman	4:56
2.	"We Shall Not Be Shaken"	M. Redman, Jonas Myrin	3:51
3.	"Through it All"	M. Redman, Myrin	4:56
4.	"You Alone Can Rescue"	M. Redman, Myrin	4:48
5.	"The Glory of Our King"	Myrin, Jess Cates, M. Redman	4:27
6.	"How Great is Your Faithfulness"	M. Redman, Myrin	4:22
7.	"Remembrance (Communion Song)"	Matt Maher, M. Redman	5:59
8.	"The More We See"	M. Redman, Chris Tomlin	4:19
9.	"For Your Glory"	Ben Cantelon, M. Redman	5:07
10.	"Gloria"	M. Redman, Myrin, Peter Kvint	4:36
11.	"All That Really Matters"	M. Redman, Myrin	5:20
12.	"My Hope"	Tim Wanstall, M. Redman, Robert Marvin	3:58
Total length:			56:33

== Personnel ==
- Matt Redman – lead vocals
- Robert Marvin – keyboards (1–6, 8–11), programming (1–6, 8–11)
- Nathan Nockels – keyboards (1–5, 8, 11), programming (1–5, 8, 11)
- Tim Wanstall – keyboards (3, 4, 7, 12), programming (3, 4, 7, 12)
- Cason Cooley – keyboards (6, 7, 10), programming (6, 7, 10)
- Josiah Bell – keyboards (9), programming (9)
- Andy Selby – keyboards (9), programming (9)
- Tyler Burkam – guitars (1, 3–5, 8–11)
- David May – guitars (1, 6–11)
- Gary Burnette – guitars (4, 6, 7, 9, 10)
- Cary Barlowe – guitars (4)
- Tony Lucido – bass (1–11)
- Jeremy Lutito – drums (1–11)
- Brent Kutzle – cello (12)
- Bryan Brown – backing vocals (1, 3, 4, 6, 8–10)
- Jonas Myrin – backing vocals (2–7, 10, 11)
- Christa Black – backing vocals (3, 4, 6, 10)
- Beth Redman – backing vocals (3, 4, 6, 10)

== Production ==
- Louie Giglio – executive producer
- Les Moir – executive producer
- Brad O'Donnell – executive producer
- Robert Marvin – producer, recording
- Joe Baldridge – vocal recording
- Nathan Nockels – vocal recording
- Travis Brigman – recording assistant
- F. Reid Shippen – mixing at Robot Lemon (Nashville, Tennessee)
- Buckley Miller – mix assistant
- Greg Calbi – mastering at Sterling Sound (New York City, New York)
- Gary Dorsey – art direction, design
- David Molnar – photography
- Shelley Giglio – management

== Singles ==
- "This is How We Know" (2009)
- "You Alone Can Rescue" (2010)
