= Blessed Be Your Name (song) =

2002 song by Matt Redman

Song by Matt Redman

from the album Where Angels Fear to Tread
- Released: 2002
- Recorded: 2002
- Genre: Contemporary worship music
- Songwriters: Matt Redman, Beth Redman

"Blessed Be Your Name"

Single by Tree63

from the album The Answer to the Question
- Released: 2003
- Genre: Contemporary worship music
- Label: Essential
- Songwriters: Matt Redman, Beth Redman

"Blessed Be Your Name" is a song by English Christian singer-songwriters Matt Redman and Beth Redman, performed by Matt Redman. The track appeared on Redman's 2002 album Where Angels Fear to Tread on the Worship Together label. The Matt Redman track was not released as a single.

The song was covered as a single in 2003 by the South African Christian band Tree63. That version peaked at number 2 on the US Billboard Christian Songs chart, becoming their first and biggest chart success. The single stayed on that chart for 68 weeks. They included the track in their album in 2004, The Answer to the Question. Their version is included on WOW Hits 2005. Also in 2004, Newsboys covered the song for their Devotion album.

The song has reappeared on later compilation albums, specifically on the Matt Redman 2005 compilation album Blessed Be Your Name: The Songs of Matt Redman Vol. 1, released on Survivor Records, and on Tree63's 2008 compilation album Blessed Be Your Name: The Hits, released on Inpop Records.

== Awards ==
In 2005, the song won the GMA Dove Award for Worship Song of the Year.

== Charts ==
=== Weekly charts ===
Chart (2003)	Peak position
US Hot Christian Songs (Billboard)	2

=== Year-end charts ===
Chart (2004)	Position
US Billboard Hot Christian Songs	1

=== Decade-end charts ===
Chart (2000s)	Position
Billboard Hot Christian Songs	7
