= Dreams Plans Everything =

Studio album by Jonas Myrin
- Released: August 8, 2012
- Genre: Pop, Indie pop
- Label: EMI (2012); Duva Records / Polydor/Island / Universal (2013)
- Producer: Jonas Myrin, Carl Wikström Ask, Peter Kvint, Crispin Hunt, Björn Hallberg, Christian Walz, Joakim Olovsson

Dreams Plans Everything is the debut studio album by Swedish singer-songwriter Jonas Myrin, released on 8 August 2012 on EMI Records in Germany. A reissue was released in 2013 across Germany, Austria and Switzerland on Duva Records, under exclusive licence to Polydor/Island, a division of Universal Music Group.

== Background ==
Prior to the album, Myrin had been active as a worship leader at Hillsong Church London and as a co-writer for international acts. Dreams Plans Everything marked his debut as a solo recording artist.

The album was produced primarily by Myrin and Carl Wikström Ask, with additional production from Peter Kvint — a Swedish producer whose credits include Britney Spears and A-ha — as well as Christian Walz, Crispin Hunt, Björn Hallberg and Joakim Olovsson. The album was mixed at Hansa Tonstudios in Berlin and mastered at Sterling Sound in New York by Tom Coyne.

== Singles ==
The lead single, "Day of the Battle", was released on 27 July 2012 and was certified gold in Germany. The single was written by Tom Baxter and Adam Midgley and co-produced by Myrin and Carl Wikström Ask.

On New Year's Eve 2012–13, Myrin performed at the Brandenburg Gate in Berlin as part of ZDF's nationally broadcast Willkommen 2013 concert, alongside Pet Shop Boys, Bonnie Tyler and Loreen.

== Track listing ==
Standard edition (2012)
No.	Title	Writer(s)	{{{extra_column}}}	Length
1.	"Dreams Plans Everything"	Gary Go	Produced by Björn Hallberg, Carl Wikström Ask, Jonas Myrin	4:46
2.	"Day of the Battle"	Tom Baxter, Adam Midgley	Produced by Carl Wikström Ask, Jonas Myrin	3:35
3.	"Dead Alive"	Lauren Evans, Tortuga	Produced by Christian Walz	4:01
4.	"Elephants & Drum Machines"	Christian Walz	Produced by Carl Wikström Ask, Jonas Myrin; additional production by Christian Walz	3:49
5.	"Broken Is Beautiful"	Joel Pott	Produced by Carl Wikström Ask, Jonas Myrin; strings arranged by Erik Arvinder	3:55
6.	"The Astronaut"	Joakim Olovsson	Produced by Joakim Olovsson; strings arranged by Erik Arvinder	3:26
7.	"Not Alone"	Crispin Hunt	Produced by Carl Wikström Ask, Crispin Hunt, Jonas Myrin	4:23
8.	"Prisoner"	Peter Kvint	Produced by Carl Wikström Ask, Jonas Myrin; additional production by Peter Kvint	3:38
9.	"Grace"	Jeffrey Steele	Produced by Carl Wikström Ask, Jonas Myrin; strings arranged by Erik Arvinder	3:57
10.	"Kingdom"	Crispin Hunt	Produced by Carl Wikström Ask, Jonas Myrin	3:54
11.	"Heartbreak But Worse"	Iain Archer	Produced by Carl Wikström Ask, Jonas Myrin; strings arranged by Erik Arvinder	3:31
12.	"Man on a Wire"	Matt Redman	Produced by Carl Wikström Ask, Jonas Myrin; brass arranged by Svante Halldin, strings arranged by Erik Arvinder	5:18

Bonus track (2013 reissue)
No.	Title	Writer(s)	{{{extra_column}}}	Length
13.	"Grace (Unplugged)"	Jeffrey Steele	Produced by Jonas Myrin, Peter Kvint	4:45

== Personnel ==
=== Performance ===
- Jonas Myrin — vocals, piano, instruments, executive producer
- Gary Go — additional vocals ("Dreams Plans Everything")
- Adam Midgley — vocals, whistling ("Day of the Battle")
- Tom Baxter — whistling ("Day of the Battle")
- Christian Walz — backing vocals ("Dead Alive", "Elephants & Drum Machines")
- Peter Kvint — backing vocals, guitar, mandolin, omnichord, whistling ("Prisoner")

=== Production ===
- Carl Wikström Ask — producer, instruments (most tracks)
- Jonas Myrin — producer, instruments (most tracks)
- Björn Hallberg — producer ("Dreams Plans Everything"); additional guitars ("Broken Is Beautiful")
- Christian Walz — producer ("Dead Alive"); additional production ("Elephants & Drum Machines")
- Crispin Hunt — producer ("Not Alone"); additional production ("Kingdom")
- Joakim Olovsson — producer, bass, engineer, guitar, keyboards, mandolin, percussion ("The Astronaut")
- Peter Kvint — additional production ("Prisoner"); producer ("Grace (Unplugged)")
- Erik Arvinder — string arrangements ("Broken Is Beautiful", "The Astronaut", "Grace", "Heartbreak But Worse", "Man on a Wire", "Grace (Unplugged)")
- Svante Halldin — brass arrangements ("Man on a Wire")
- Michael Illbert — mixing (tracks 1–12), Hansa Tonstudios, Berlin
- Peter Kvint — mixing ("Grace (Unplugged)")
- Tom Coyne — mastering, Sterling Sound, New York
- Robin Günther — artwork and design concept
- Henrik Halvarsson — cover photography
- Daniel Standke — A&R

== Release history ==
Region	Date	Label	Format	Catalogue number
Germany	8 August 2012	EMI	CD	5099991462428
Germany, Austria, Switzerland	28 June 2013	Duva Records / Polydor/Island / Universal	CD	06025 3739638 2
