= Beautiful News =

Album by Matt Redman

Studio album by Matt Redman
- Released: 26 December 2006
- Studio: Curtis Schwartz Studios (Ardingly): Abbey Road Studios (London, UK); Esselle Studios (Brighton, UK); Dutchland Studios, The Smoakstack and Sound Stage Studios (Nashville, Tennessee, USA)
- Genre: Worship, contemporary Christian music
- Label: sixsteps
- Producer: Doubledutch

Matt Redman chronology
Blessed Be Your Name (2005)	Beautiful News (2006)	We Shall Not Be Shaken (2009)

Professional ratings
Review scores
Source	Rating
Christian Music Today	4.5/5 stars
Jesus Freak Hideout	3.5/5 stars

Beautiful News is an album by Christian worship artist Matt Redman. Two songs, "Take it To The Streets" and "All Over the World", were written in collaboration with Martin Smith, lead singer of Christian band Delirious? while "A Greater Song" was written in collaboration with worship artist Paul Baloche.

"All Over The World" was covered by Tree63 on their album Worship Volume One: I Stand For You.

"You Never Let Go" was covered by Rebecca St. James on her 2011 album I Will Praise You, Stellar Kart on their album Everything Is Different Now, Jeremy Camp on We Cry Out: The Worship Project in 2010, AJ Michalka of Aly & AJ and James Denton for their film, Grace Unplugged, and by the Mexican band Rojo in Spanish, as "No Me Soltarás" on Con el Corazón en la Mano in 2007.

== Track listing ==
Album release
No.	Title	Writer(s)	Length
1.	"Beautiful News"	Matt Redman	3:49
2.	"You Never Let Go"	Redman	4:47
3.	"Shine"	Redman	5:00
4.	"Take It to the Streets"	Redman, Martin Smith	5:41
5.	"Yes and Amen"	Josiah Bell, Robert Marvin, Redman	6:16
6.	"A Greater Song"	Paul Baloche, Redman	5:01
7.	"Blessing"	Redman	3:34
8.	"Thank You for Healing Me"	Redman	4:42
9.	"Fearfully and Wonderfully Made"	Redman	5:07
10.	"All Over the World"	Redman, Smith	4:18
11.	"When All Is Said and Done"	Redman	3:28
12.	"If You Know You're Loved By the King"	Redman	7:39
Total length:			59:22

- "If You Know You're Loved By the King" contains a hidden remix track of "Beautiful News".

== Production ==
- Louie Giglio – executive producer
- Les Moir – executive producer
- Brad O'Donnell – executive producer
- Doubledutch (Josiah Bell and Robert Marvin) – producers
- Curtis Schwartz – recording
- Chris Bolster – recording
- John Barnett – recording assistant
- Josiah Bell – recording assistant
- Robert Marvin – recording assistant
- Paul Moak – recording assistant
- Jan Kotzmann – string engineer
- Cenda Kotzmann – assistant string engineer
- F. Reid Shippen – mixing
- Andy Selby – additional editing
- Greg Calbi – mastering at Sterling Sound (New York, NY)
- Jess Chambers – A&R administration
- Holly Meyers – A&R administration
- Jan Cook – creative direction
- Tim Frank – art direction
- Benji Peck – design, illustration
- Andy Hutch – photography

== Personnel ==
- Matt Redman – vocals
- Josiah Bell – programming, all other instruments (2), backing vocals (4), additional backing vocals (6)
- Robert Marvin – programming, acoustic piano (2, 5), all other instruments (2)
- Paul Moak – acoustic piano (1–3, 9, 11, 12), guitars, programming (2), all other instruments (2), Rhodes electric piano (6), Hammond B3 organ (9)
- Andy Selby – programming (4, 8)
- David May – additional guitars (2–4, 6–11)
- Matt Weeks – bass (1, 3–10)
- Tony Lucido – bass (2)
- Travis Nunn – drums (1, 3–10)
- Jeremy Lutito – drums (2), percussion (2)
- Philharmonic Orchestra – strings (5, 6)
- Tim Harries – string arrangements (5, 6)
- Joni McCabe – string conductor (5, 6)
- Petr Pycha – string contractor (5, 6)
- John Ellis – backing vocals (2–4, 7, 10), additional guitars (4, 6, 7), additional backing vocals (6)
- Nickie Conely – additional backing vocals (6), backing vocals (9)
- Quintin Delport – additional backing vocals (6)
- Jorge Mhondera – additional backing vocals (6)

Choir (Tracks 5, 6, 8 & 10)

- Delores Cox, Hope Darst, Nirva Dorsaint, Lisa Kimmey, Jerard Woods and Juan Winans
