= William Ernest Weeks =

- Born: 5 August 1986 (age 39)
- Occupations: Songwriter; Record Producer; Musician
- Website: willieweeksmusic.com

Willie Weeks (born 5 August 1986) is a British musician, songwriter, and record producer. One of his songs with Matt Redman reached No. 1 in the U.S. Billboard Top Christian Albums chart in 2013, and he has since worked with and contributed music for Stray Kids, BTS, Monsta X, Cravity, Taeyeon, SF9, TVXQ, Mark & Xiumin, Oh My Girl and Newton Faulkner.

== Career ==
His first achievement came in 2013, writing for Matt Redman's Your Grace Finds Me. Weeks has since been involved in other songs for Redman's albums, including These Christmas Lights, Unbroken Praise and Glory Song. He was also a part of writing "27 Million", a song by Matt Redman and LZ7, who released it with the intention to raise awareness for the A21 Campaign, with the aim to abolish modern day slavery. The song reached No. 12 in the UK official singles chart.

He wrote the Kpop song, "Wishing on a Star" for BTS's Youth album in 2016. Since then, Weeks has written and produced several songs which led UKP magazine to name him the brain behind K-pop.

He wrote the Monsta X songs "Follow: Find You", which reached No. 1 on the Gaon Music Chart, "Fantasia X" and "Love Killa" from the band's Fatal Love album. He also wrote "Extra VIP" for SixTones' 1ST. He has also written for Ive, Cravity, Taeyeon, SF9, Mark & Xiumin and Oh My Girl. He has also worked as a songwriter and producer with Newton Faulkner, TVXQ and Kizzy Crawford

In 2023, he arranged and composed the song "Blind Spot" for the album Rock-Star with Stray Kids members Bang Chan, Changbin, and HAN (known collectively as 3RACHA). The album, Rock-Star, reached No. 1 on the Billboard 200 charts.

In 2024, he and Kyler Niko produced and wrote a song (titled "Infinity") with NIJISANJI EN Livers, Shu Yamino and Sonny Brisko, as part of the monthly NIJI ENcounter project.
