= Myrin =

Myrin is a surname. Notable people with the surname include:

- Arden Myrin (born 1973), American actress, author, and comedian
- Jonas Myrin (born 1982), Swedish singer, songwriter and producer
