= Land (Tree63 album) =

Studio album by Tree63
- Released: September 11, 2015
- Genre: Christian alternative rock
- Length: 46:26
- Label: Fuel

Tree63 chronology
Blessed Be Your Name: The Hits (2008)	Land (2015)	Voyage (2026)

Land is the seventh studio album by Tree63. Fuel Music released the album on September 11, 2015.

== Critical reception ==
Professional ratings
Review scores
Source	Rating
Alpha Omega News	A
CCM Magazine	4.5/5 stars
Christian Music Review	4/5
Cross Rhythms	9/10 squares
Jesus Freak Hideout	4/5 stars
New Release Today	4/5 stars
The Phantom Tollbooth	3/5
Worship Leader	4/5 stars

Awarding the album four and a half stars from CCM Magazine, Kevin Sparkman writes, "Tree63's Land deserves nothing short of a ticker-tape parade." Mary Nikkel, giving the album four stars at New Release Today, states, "Although this album may largely appeal to a particular niche, for any who choose to sail into its rich waters, it is a voyage well worth the taking." Signaling in a four star review by Jesus Freak Hideout, describes, "The fact is that Land is without a doubt the most diverse, nuanced, and interesting Tree63 album yet, while maintaining a worshipful tone...Land is a quality record that should be heard." Chris Webb, assigning the album a nine out of ten for Cross Rhythms, says, "This album is not just to support some live performances; this is a stand-alone statement of intent that Tree63 are back on track."

Rob Snyder, rating the album an A for Alpha Omega News, says, "the lyrics are simple but inspiring and real". Giving the album a 4.0 out of five by Christian Music Review, Laura Chambers states, "Land authentically...[concludes] that God is good and His promises are real, no matter how it might seem". Scott Mertens, indicating in a three out of five review at The Phantom Tollbooth, replies, "Land is a mix of the big, arena sound of their past and softer, mellower works." Rating the album four stars from Worship Leader, Jay Akins states, "Strong melodies and well-written stories draw the listen into the moments of each song. Land is a great album full of hope and compassion for everyone listening."

== Track listing ==
Track list
No.	Title	Length
1.	"Alive"	3:16
2.	"The Storm"	3:08
3.	"A Whisper"	4:45
4.	"Standing on It"	3:59
5.	"If God"	3:48
6.	"Hard to Believe"	4:00
7.	"Ship"	3:05
8.	"Every Reason"	3:14
9.	"Stumbling Stone"	4:14
10.	"Blood Flows"	4:43
11.	"The Greatest Story Ever Told"	4:28
12.	"Never Had a Winter"	3:52
Total length:		46:26
