= Blessed Be Your Name: The Hits =

Greatest hits album by Tree63
- Released: 2008
- Recorded: 2000–2007
- Genre: Worship; Christian & Gospel

Tree63 chronology
Sunday! (2007)	Blessed Be Your Name: The Hits (2008)	Unfinished Dream: Songs from the Sunday Sessions (2014)

Blessed Be Your Name: The Hits is Tree63's greatest hits album. It was released in 2008 on Inpop Records.

== Track listing ==
No.	Title	Original Album
1.	Blessed Be Your Name	The Answer to the Question
2.	Treasure	Tree63
3.	King	The Answer to the Question
4.	Over And Over Again	The Answer to the Question
5.	Sunday	Sunday!
6.	The Answer To The Question	The Answer to the Question
7.	All Over the World	Worship, Vol. 1: I Stand for You
8.	Nothing But The Blood	Worship, Vol. 1: I Stand for You
9.	Joy	Tree63
10.	Look What You've Done	Tree63
11.	I Stand For You (2005)	Worship, Vol. 1: I Stand for You
12.	Amazing Grace (Live)	Worship, Vol. 1: I Stand for You
