= Veritas (Veritas album) =

Studio album by Veritas
- Released: September 9, 2014
- Genre: Classical Crossover; Operatic Pop; Vocal; Adult Contemporary; Christian
- Length: 44:54
- Label: Fair Trade Services
- Producer: Kent Hooper, Phillip Keveren

Veritas is the first album from Veritas. It was released through Fair Trade Services on September 9, 2014. Veritas worked with Kent Hooper and Phillip Keveren in the production of this album.

== Reception ==
Professional ratings
Review scores
Source	Rating
365 Days of Inspiring Media	3.5/5 stars
CCM Magazine	3/5 stars
New Release Tuesday	4/5 stars

In a three star out of five review for CCM Magazine, Grace S. Aspinwall describes the album as "Possibly one of the most diverse and intriguing projects this year... Truly remarkable work from the quartet". Caitlin Lassiter, writes a four star album review for New Release Tuesday, realizing, "this album seems to have it all. Backed by smooth vocals that blend beautifully from start to finish and pitch-perfect harmonies, the group has mastered an unmistakable new sound - a sound that could very well be a breath of fresh air into the world of Christian music." Awarding the album three and a half stars at 365 Days of Inspiring Media, Joshua Andre says, "Veritas’ debut album has done is widen my musical horizons so that I can appreciate songs outside of my genre without loving them more than other tracks."

== Track listing ==
No.	Title	Writer(s)	Length
1.	"Agnus Dei Medley: A Mighty Fortress/All Hail the Power of Jesus' Name"	Michael W. Smith	5:44
2.	"You'll Never Walk Alone"	Oscar Hammerstein II, Richard Rodgers	4:17
3.	"Dare You to Move"	Jonathan Mark Foreman	4:32
4.	"Love of My Life"	Randy Cox, Kent Hooper, Phillip Keveren	3:57
5.	"I Can Only Imagine"	Bart Millard	4:30
6.	"The Hand That Holds the Storm"	Paul Allen, Jeff Pardo	4:10
7.	"An American Anthology: God Bless America\America the Beautiful\Battle Hymn of the Republic"	Katharine Lee Bates, Irving Berlin, Samuel A. Ward	4:54
8.	"10,000 Reasons"	Jonas Myrin, Matt Redman	4:57
9.	"If You're Out There"	Marcus Bryant, Devon Harris, Kawan Prather, John Stephens	4:18
10.	"The Lord's Prayer"	Albert Hay Malotte	3:35
Total length:			44:54

== Charts ==
Chart (2014)	Peak position
US Christian Albums (Billboard)	39
US Top Classical Albums (Billboard)	4
US Heatseekers Albums (Billboard)	35
