= Your Grace Finds Me =

Live album by Matt Redman
- Released: 24 September 2013
- Recorded: Live at Passion City Church (Atlanta, Georgia, USA)
- Studio: Brighton Electric Studios and Luna Sound (Brighton, UK); Berwick Lane (Atlanta, Georgia, USA)
- Genre: Contemporary worship music, contemporary Christian music
- Length: 65:15
- Label: sixsteps, Sparrow
- Producer: Nathan Nockels

Matt Redman chronology
10,000 Reasons (2011)	Your Grace Finds Me (2013)	Unbroken Praise (2015)

Your Grace Finds Me was the third live album from contemporary worship musician Matt Redman, which it was released by the dual labels sixstepsrecords and Sparrow Records on 24 September 2013, and it was produced by Nathan Nockels. This was Redman's eleventh album for his career. The album has achieved commercial charting successes, as well as, it has received critical acclaim from music critics.

== Music and lyrics ==
At Worship Leader, Andrea Hunter wrote that "The songs reel you in and keep you singing; they are filled with hope and joy and proclaim a God who is gracious, merciful, loving and just." Mark Geil of Jesus Freak Hideout said that "When it works, the album works exceedingly well, and Redman continues to grow as an important and valued praise and worship songwriter. Many of these songs will certainly impact the church, consistently pointing believers to our God and the grace that spans a universe to find us." At HM, Sarah Arendas Roberts wrote that "As his music usually does, Matt Redman's new album meets you and ushers you into a place on honesty before the living God; worship follows."

Kevin Davis of New Release Tuesday stated that the release "keeps Matt's signature holy energy flowing, and has plenty more songs that you'll soon be singing with fellow believers", and it "provides listeners with twelve tracks of vertical offerings to God that you can sing in any circumstance." At Louder Than the Music, Dave Wood wrote that "Somehow worship songs feel more real when they are recorded live, in front of a room full of people whose focus is on worshiping God. Matt Redman has again shown his willingness and ability to produce songs the global church can claim as their own. With a fresh sound, thought-out arrangements and lyrics that are steeped in worship".

== Critical reception ==
Professional ratings
Review scores
Source	Rating
AllMusic	3.5/5 stars
CCM Magazine	4/5 stars
Christian Music Review	4/5 stars
Cross Rhythms	10/10 squares
HM	4/5 stars
Jesus Freak Hideout	3.5/5 stars
Louder Than the Music	4.5/5 stars
New Release Tuesday	4/5 stars
Worship Leader	5/5 stars

Your Grace Finds Me garnered critical acclaim by music critics. Matt Conner of CCM Magazine said that the release "comfortably fits in the catalog as another loaded live offering." At HM, Sarah Arendas Roberts affirmed that "If you enjoy quality musicianship, Matt Redman's vocals, and music that will lead you into the worship place — that you can sing along with — you will thoroughly enjoy Redman's new album," which she called "Beautiful." Tom Jurek of AllMusic felt that the release "will certainly resonate with fans."

At Worship Leader, Andrea Hunter proclaimed that "Truly, every song on Your Grace Finds Me is tailored for some part of the service of worship." Tony Cummings of Cross Rhythms evoked that this album "shows that he is still the world Church's most consistent creator of heartwarming worship songs." At Jesus Freak Hideout, Mark Geil highlighted that "Your Grace Finds Me is poised to continue the wave, and though it has its weaker moments, there is much to be celebrated on Redman's latest."

Jay Heilman of Christian Music Review alluded to how "If you are looking for the total worship experience in a way that Redman has continuously drawn fans for years, then Your Grace Finds Me is one you will want to find yourself immersed in." At Louder Than the Music, Dave Wood called the release "a brilliant modern praise album." Kevin Davis of New Release Tuesday felt that this album was "an excellent follow-up" to his last release.

== Chart performance ==
For the Billboard charting week of 12 October 2013, Your Grace Finds Me was the No. 28 most sold album in the entirety of the United States by the Billboard 200, and it was the No. 1 Top Christian Album sold the same week.

== Track listing ==
No.	Title	Writer(s)	Length
1.	"Sing and Shout"	Jorge Mhondera, Matt Redman, Willie Weeks	4:21
2.	"Your Grace Finds Me"	Jonas Myrin, M. Redman	5:40
3.	"Mercy"	Myrin, Redman	5:34
4.	"I Need You Now"	Scott Ligertwood, Myrin, M. Redman	7:02
5.	"This Beating Heart"	Myrin, M. Redman	4:52
6.	"One Name Alone"	Jason Ingram, Myrin, M. Redman	4:33
7.	"Jesus, Only Jesus"	Christy Nockels, Nathan Nockels, M. Redman, Kristian Stanfill, Chris Tomlin, Tony Wood	5:42
8.	"Wide as the Sky"	Myrin, M. Redman, Stanfill	5:11
9.	"Good Forever"	Ingram, Reuben Morgan, M. Redman	5:32
10.	"Let My People Go"	Gary Baker, Myrin, Beth Redman, M. Redman	4:12
11.	"Come and See"	Ingram, Matt Maher, M. Redman, Tomlin	5:31
12.	"The Benediction"	Myrin, Redman	7:05
13.	"Mercy" (radio version) (bonus track edition only)	Myrin, Redman	3:50
Total length:			65:15

== Personnel ==
- Matt Redman – lead vocals
- Nathan Nockels – keyboards, programming, strings, backing vocals
- Gabe Scott – synthesizer programming, dulcimer, beats
- Willie Weeks – synthesizer programming, banjo, beats
- Bryan Brown – acoustic guitar, backing vocals
- Daniel Carson – guitars
- James Duke – guitars
- Matt Podelsa – guitars
- Jon Duke – bass
- Jacob Arnold – drums
- Jules Adekambi – backing vocals
- Jorge Mhondera – backing vocals
- Christy Nockels – backing vocals
- Beth Redman – backing vocals

Production

- Louie Giglio – executive producer
- Shelley Giglio – executive producer, art direction, management
- Brad O'Donnell – executive producer
- Nathan Nockels – producer, overdub recording
- Jim Dineen – live event recording
- Stephen Bailey – live sound recording
- Neil Collins – rehearsal engineer
- Dan Swift – rehearsal engineer
- Luke Fellingham – additional vocal engineer
- Ainslie Grosser – mixing
- Ted Jensen – mastering at Sterling Sound (New York City, New York)
- Jess Chambers – A&R administration
- Leighton Ching – art direction, design
- Mike McCloskey – art direction, management
- Gary Dorsey – cover layout
- Anne H. Neilson – cover painting
- Brooke Bennett – photography
- Mary Caroline Mann – photography
- Bobby Russell – photography

== Charts ==
Chart (2013)	Peak position
Scottish Albums (OCC)	95
UK Albums (OCC)	68
UK Album Downloads (OCC)	55
UK Christian & Gospel Albums (OCC)	1
US Billboard 200	28
US Top Christian Albums (Billboard)	1
