= 10,000 Reasons (Bless the Lord) =

Single by Matt Redman

from the album 10,000 Reasons
- Released: 24 May 2012
- Genre: Worship, CCM
- Length: 5:42 (album version) 4:22 (single version)
- Label: sixstepsrecords, Sparrow
- Songwriters: Jonas Myrin, Matt Redman

Music video
- "10,000 Reasons (Bless the Lord)" on YouTube

"10,000 Reasons (Bless the Lord)" is a song by the English worship singer-songwriter Matt Redman from his tenth album of the same name (2011). He wrote it with the Swedish songwriter Jonas Myrin. The track was subsequently included on a number of compilations, covered by other artists and included as congregational worship music in English or in translation around the world. In 2013, at the 55th Annual Grammy Awards, the song won two Grammy Awards for "Best Contemporary Christian Music Song" and "Best Gospel/Contemporary Christian Music Performance", and the Dove Award for Song of the Year. After the song's success and impact, Redman also published a book: 10,000 Reasons: Stories of Faith, Hope, and Thankfulness Inspired by the Worship Anthem.

== Context ==
The song is a contemporary version of a classic worship song expressing "10,000 reasons for my heart to find" to praise God. The inspiration for the song came through the opening verse of Psalm 103: "Praise the Lord, my soul; all my inmost being, praise his holy name". It is also based on the 19th century English hymn "Praise, My Soul, the King of Heaven" written by Henry Francis Lyte.

Redman recalled the writing of the song was through an initial idea or suggestion from co-writer Jonas Myrin. Redman told Worship Leader magazine: "He [Myrin] played me an idea for some of the chorus melody, and I found it immediately inspiring. In fact, it felt like a perfect fit for a song based on the opening of Psalm 103. The song came together really quickly – a good chunk of the song was actually a spontaneous moment", adding that the song reiterates how "we live beneath an unceasing flow of goodness, kindness, greatness, and holiness, and every day we're given reason after reason why the Lord is so completely and utterly worthy of our highest and best devotion".

The song enumerates various attributes of the love of God for mankind that make him worthy of "praise unending", worship for "ten thousand years and then forevermore". The song uses these attributes: God's holiness, lovingkindness, slowness to anger, kind heart, His goodness and His great name. The "10,000 Reasons" concept is used in two instances in the song: First in the lyrics "Your name is great and Your heart is kind / For all Your goodness, I will keep on singing / Ten thousand reasons for my heart to find" and the second at the lyrics: "And on that day when my strength is failing / The end draws near and my time has come / Still, my soul will sing Your praise unending / Ten thousand years and then forevermore".

The refrain says:

Bless the Lord, O my soul,
O my soul, worship his holy name.
Sing like never before, O my soul.
I'll worship your holy name.

== Music video ==
A music video was filmed in a church setting in Berlin, Germany. The black-and-white video, filmed by Andy Hutch of Yodo Creative in 2012, shows Redman singing and playing the guitar accompanied by an acoustic music band and a number of backing vocalists.

== Charts ==
"10,000 Reasons (Bless the Lord)" was released in 2012 as a single and spent 16 weeks at the top spot on Christian Radio and remained No. 1 on the Billboard Christian Songs Chart for 13 weeks and was certified gold. The album containing the song as its title track peaked in its own right on the US Christian Album chart at No. 1. and No. 149 on the UK charts.

Studies analysing Christian Copyright Licensing International (CCLI) charts for the 2010s ranked "10,000 Reasons (Bless the Lord)" as the No. 1 worship song in aggregated worship-usage charts compiled from church licensing data.

The song was featured in the BBC Songs of Praise Top 100 Hymns poll and performed on the programme in January 2016, with Redman and Myrin credited.

=== Weekly charts ===
Chart (2012)	Peak position
US Bubbling Under Hot 100 (Billboard)	3
US Hot Christian Songs (Billboard)	1
US Christian Airplay (Billboard)	1
US Heatseekers Songs (Billboard)	11

=== Decade-end charts ===
Chart (2010s)	Position
US Christian Songs (Billboard)	6

== Certifications ==
Region	Certification	Certified units/sales
United Kingdom (BPI)	Silver	200,000^{‡}
United States (RIAA)	2× Platinum	2,000,000^{‡}
^{‡} Sales+streaming figures based on certification alone.

== Awards ==
Year	Organization	Award	Result	Ref.
2013	Grammy Award	Best Contemporary Christian Music Song	Won	
2013	Grammy Award	Best Gospel/Contemporary Christian Music Performance	Won	
2013	Gospel Music Association	Song of the Year	Won	
2013	Gospel Music Association	Contemporary Christian Performance of the Year	Won	
2013	Dove Award	Song of the Year	Won	
2013	Dove Award	Contemporary Christian Performance of the Year	Won	
2013	Dove Award	Pop Contemporary Song	Won	

== Covers ==
The song has been covered by a number of artists and bands including:

- Irish worship band, Rend Collective, in their 2013 album Campfire.
- Contemporary Christian music group The Katinas in their 2014 album Sunday Set, accompanied by a music video
- The vocal quintet Veritas in their self-titled 2014 album Veritas
- The Christian reggae band Christafari in their 2015 album Anthems. Their version features additional vocals by Avion Blackman. The release was accompanied by a music video.

At Passion 2014 in Houston, it was sung by the song's co-writer Matt Redman. It was also performed at Passion 2015 in Houston, featuring vocals from Chris Tomlin, Brett Younker and Kristian Stanfill.

Parts of the song were incorporated by rapper KB as part of his track, "10k", on his 2020 album His Glory Alone. It peaked at No. 36 on the Billboard Hot Christian Songs chart.

The song has been translated into a number of languages. It was recorded in Spanish as "Diez Mil Razones (10,000 Reasons)" by Evan Craft in an acoustic version in his 2012 album Yo Soy Segundo. and in German as "Zehntausend Gründe" ("10,000 Gründe") by the German Christian band Outbreakband and recorded on their album Das ist unser Gott, a live album performed at the Glaubenszentrum Bad Gandersheim.

== The book ==
Cover of 10,000 Reasons: Stories of Faith, Hope, and Thankfulness Inspired by the Worship Anthem

Matt Redman co-authored with Craig Borlase the book 10,000 Reasons (full title 10,000 Reasons: Stories of Faith, Hope, and Thankfulness Inspired by the Worship Anthem). In the 176-page book published in 2017 by David C Cook Publishing Company, and a foreword written by Christian author Max Lucado, Redman shares details behind the song's creation and explores the influences and experiences the song generated with many vivid examples of inspiring stories, experiences and testimonies by individuals in their greatest time of need.
