= Facedown (album) =

Live album by Matt Redman
- Released: 2004
- Recorded: January 2004 at North Point Community Church (Alpharetta, Georgia, USA)
- Studio: The Orange Room, Bluestone Studios and Abbey Road Studios (London, UK): Northwind Recording (Kloof, South Africa); Berwick Lane (Atlanta, Georgia, USA); Bridgeway Studios (Nashville, Tennessee, USA)
- Genre: Worship
- Label: Survivor
- Producer: Nathan Nockels

Matt Redman chronology
Where Angels Fear to Tread (2002)	Facedown (2004)	Blessed Be Your Name (2005)

Professional ratings
Review scores
Source	Rating
Jesus Freak Hideout	link

Facedown is an album by worship artist Matt Redman. The song "Nothing But the Blood" has been covered by Jamie Hill (of the band Quench) on his album One Day.

It was recorded during the Facedown: Conference for Songwriters, which was held January 28–30, 2004, at North Point Community Church in Alpharetta, Georgia. One song, Facedown, was re-included on Redman's next album Blessed Be Your Name: The Songs of Matt Redman Vol. 1. However, producer Nathan Nockels augmented that version with numerous overdubs.

== Track listing ==
All songs written by Matt Redman, except where noted.

1. "Praise Awaits You" - 4:45
2. "Nothing But The Blood" (Redman, Robert Lowry) - 6:37
3. "Seeing You" - 6:41
4. "Gifted Response (We Will Worship You)" - 6:04
5. "Dancing Generation" - 5:08
6. "Pure Light" - 5:21
7. "Worthy, You Are Worthy"; Duet with Chris Tomlin - 5:55
8. "Lead Us Up The Mountain" - 1:25
9. "Facedown" - 5:41
10. "Breathing The Breath" - 5:48
11. "Mission's Flame" - 5:33
12. "Raise A Voice" - 2:35
13. "If I Have Not Love" - 4:44

== Personnel ==
- Matt Redman – vocals, acoustic guitar
- Andrew Phillip – keyboards
- Nathan Nockels – acoustic piano, Wurlitzer electric piano, Hammond B3 organ
- John Ellis – electric guitars
- Gary Burnette – additional guitars
- Jonathan Ahrens – bass
- Terl Bryant – drums, percussion
- David Raven – drums, percussion
- Lex Brodie – backing vocals
- Christy Nockels – backing vocals
- Chris Tomlin – additional vocals (7)

=== Production ===
- Louie Giglio – executive producer
- Les Moir – producer
- Nathan Nockels – producer, additional recording
- Tom Laune – recording, mixing (US release)
- Aaron Hawthorne – recording assistant
- Stephen Lotz – recording assistant
- Niklas Fairclough – additional recording
- Julian Kindred – additional recording
- Paul Hicks – mixing (UK release)
- Alan Scannell – mix assistant (UK release)
- Dave Lynch – compiling (UK release)
- Matt Rowbottom – compiling (UK release)
- ICC Studios (Sussex, UK) – compiling location (UK release)
- Chris Blair – mastering (UK release)
- Richard Dodd – mastering (US release)
- Jan Cook – creative director
- Marcus Melton – art direction, design
- Andrew Phillip – front cover design
- Benji Peck – front cover design
- David Salmon – front cover design
- Martin Butcher – photo image
- Matt Huesmann – live photography
- Katherine Bombay – photography
- Megan Thompson – stylist

Live crew

- Chris Briley – live sound
- Simon Ward – project production manager
- Jayce Fincher – additional technical crew
- John Gray – additional technical crew
- Brad Horton – additional technical crew
- Tom Redman – additional technical crew
- Ciete Terrell – additional technical crew
