= The Life and Times of Absolute Truth =

The Life And Times Of Absolute Truth

Studio album by Tree63
- Released: 2002
- Studio: Northwind Recording (Kloof, South Africa)
- Genre: Contemporary Christian Music
- Producer: Niklas Fairclough

Tree63 chronology
Tree63 (2000)	The Life And Times Of Absolute Truth (2002)	The Answer to the Question (2004)

The Life And Times Of Absolute Truth is South African rock band Tree63's fourth album. It was released in 2002. The songs on this album gained popularity in Australia, Canada, South Africa and the UK.

== Track listing ==
All songs written by John Ellis.

1. "The Glorious Ones" - 3:30
2. "All Hands" - 3:17
3. "No Words" - 3:50
4. "All Because" - 4:31
5. "Anxious Seat" - 2:49
6. "Here of All Places" -
7. "Be All End All" - 4:08
8. "It's All About to Change" - 2:51
9. "Surprise Surprise" - 3:16
10. "How Did I Sleep?" - 8:49

== Personnel ==
Tree63

- John Ellis – vocals, keyboards, guitars, loops
- Daniel Ornellas – bass
- Darryl Swart – drums, percussion

=== Production ===
- Steve Ford – executive producer
- John Ellis – producer, cover photography
- Niklas Fairclough – producer, recording, mixing, photography
- Sarah-Jane Hall – assistant engineer
- Ken Love – mastering at MasterMix (Nashville, Tennessee)
- Anthony Ellis – art direction, design
- Steve Hopper – photography
- Patrick McGee – photography
- Clive Thompson – photography
- Andy Skarda and Sound Choice Management – management
