= Wake Up My Soul =

Studio album by Matt Redman
- Released: 1993
- Studio: ICC Studios (Sussex, England, UK)
- Genre: Worship
- Length: 51:06
- Label: Kingsway Records
- Producer: Matt Redman: Martin Smith

Matt Redman chronology
Wake Up My Soul (1993)	Passion For Your Name (1995)

Wake Up My Soul is the debut album by worship artist Matt Redman.

== Track listing ==
All songs written by Matt Redman, except where noted.

1. "Wake Up, My Soul" - 4:34
2. "Here Am I, a Sinner Free" - 5:30
3. "Glory to My King" - 5:25
4. "There's a Sound of Singing" (Redman, Paul Donnelly) - 4:33
5. "The Angels, Lord, They Sing" - 5:36
6. "You Give Me Love" - 4:27
7. "The Works of His Hands" - 4:56
8. "Oh, How I Love Jesus" (Jeff Searles, Frederick Whitfield) - 3:49
9. "I've Got a Love Song" - 4:35
10. "Now Unto The King" (Joey Holder) - 4:40
11. "No Longer Just Servants" - 3:28

== Personnel ==
- Matt Redman – lead vocals
- Richard Causon – keyboards, acoustic piano, Hammond organ
- Paul Donnelly – acoustic guitar
- Martin Smith – acoustic guitar, mandolin, backing vocals
- Stuart Garrard – electric guitars
- Les Moir – bass
- Martin Neil – drums, percussion
- Mike Haughton – alto saxophone, soprano saxophone, penny whistle, recorder
- Nick Rodwell – soprano saxophone (5)
- Helen Burgess – backing vocals
- Natalie Clarke – backing vocals
- Noelle Lane – backing vocals
- David Lyle Morris – backing vocals
- Adrian Thompson – backing vocals (6)

=== Production ===
- Mike Pilavachi – executive producer
- David Pytches – executive producer
- Matt Redman – producer, arrangements
- Martin Smith – producer, arrangements, recording, mixing

== Release details ==
- 1993, UK, Kingsway Records KMCD781, Release Date ? ? 1993, CD
- 2000, UK, Survivor Records SURCD040, Release Date 21 July 2000, CD (double CD with "Passion For Your Name")
