= Good News (Ian Yates album) =

Studio album by Ian Yates
- Released: 24 June 2012
- Genre: CCM, rock, alternative rock, worship, pop rock
- Length: 48:43
- Label: 7Core

Ian Yates chronology
The Hope and the Glory (2010)	Good News (2012)	DNA (2014)

Good News is the second studio album by British musician Ian Yates. 7Core Music released the album on 24 June 2012.

== Critical reception ==
Professional ratings
Review scores
Source	Rating
Cross Rhythms	10/10 squares
Louder Than the Music	4.5/5 stars
New Release Today	3.5/5 stars

Rating the album a ten out of ten for Cross Rhythms, Tony Cummings writes, "We must now report that, if anything, 'Good News' is even better." Sarah Fine, giving the album three and a half stars from New Release Today, states, "this is a fantastic album." Awarding the album five stars at Louder Than the Music, Dave Wood describes, "Ian's sublime and unique style cleverly mixes sounds to produce a diverse album full of creativeness."

== Track listing ==
Track listing
No.	Title	Length
1.	"An Introduction"	3:36
2.	"Good News"	3:29
3.	"Burning for You"	3:45
4.	"Trusting in You"	3:19
5.	"The Lord Is Here"	4:52
6.	"You Found Me"	5:57
7.	"Freedom"	4:04
8.	"The Cross Changed Everything"	6:19
9.	"New"	3:40
10.	"The Father's Love"	3:47
11.	"You Are Here"	5:55
Total length:		48:43
