= Let It Be a Hallelujah =

2025 single by Lauren Daigle

Single by Lauren Daigle
- Written: 2015
- Released: July 31, 2025
- Length: 3:58
- Label: Centricity Music
- Songwriters: Busbee; Jonas Myrin; Lauren Daigle
- Producer: Austin Davis

Lauren Daigle singles chronology
"Desperate" (2025)	"Let It Be a Hallelujah" (2025)

Music video
- "Let It Be a Hallelujah" (lyrics) on YouTube

"Let It Be a Hallelujah" is a song recorded by the American pop musician Lauren Daigle. "Let It Be a Hallelujah" was released on July 31, 2025, via Centricity Music. It was written by Busbee, Jonas Myrin, and Daigle, while production was handled by Austin Davis.

== Release and promotion ==
"Let It Be a Hallelujah" was first released on July 31, 2025, exclusively to K-Love radio stations. The following day, it was released to digital download and streaming formats. The song was supported with the release of a lyric video.

== Composition ==
=== Style ===
"Let It Be a Hallelujah" is a string‑rich worship power ballad. Lindsay Williams of K‑Love described it as a "moving, string‑laden ballad" that carries the emotional weight of Daigle's early work while reflecting her artistic growth over the past decade. The 2025 recording was produced by Austin Davis, who helped Daigle re‑imagine the original 2017 demo for the 10th‑anniversary edition of How Can It Be. According to Williams, the track "pulls from time periods of long ago while also being a present time stamp", containing a combination of both older and modern production elements. The song's arrangement emphasizes melodies, strings, and vocals. The track contains "vertical lyrics, soaring melodies, and [Daigle's] signature vocal tying it all together", while concurrently being "sonically and lyrically moving", with a polished, emotive production.

=== Development ===
Daigle wrote "Let It Be a Hallelujah" in 2015, shortly following the release of her debut studio album, How Can It Be. She had not released it then and waited until 2025 to do so because she "didn't necessarily understand the weight of this lyric back then". The song never made it onto an album and had overall been forgotten entirely. In 2025, Daigle had wanted to release material in celebrationHow Can It Be's tenth anniversary, and it was suggested by her label that she select "Let It Be a Hallelujah". She also selected this song because she wanted to choose "a song that's withstood the test of time". While recording the song in 2025, Daigle collaborated with musicians who she had worked with earlier on in her career, in an attempt to "[pull] from time periods of long ago while also being a present time stamp". "Let It Be a Hallelujah" is centered on themes of praising in every season of life. The song quotes the traditional hymn, "Take My Life and Let It Be" by Francis Havergal. Daigle begins the track with the hymn's lyric:

Take my life and let it be

consecrated, Lord, to thee.

Take my moments and my days;

let them flow in endless praise.

Busbee, who wrote the song alongside Myrin and Daigle, died in 2019 of glioblastoma, a form of brain tumor. He wrote the song shortly after receiving the diagnosis.

== Reception ==
=== Critical ===
Critics responded positively to the song's emotional sound. Digital Journal praised it as "one of her best songs of faith to date since 'You Say' ", calling it "captivating... filled with positivity and inspiration". Life 90.5 oting that it "reminds us that our praise is not bound by our circumstances". Scott Savage of Air1 described it as "a reflection on God's faithfulness" shaped by Daigle's decade‑long personal journey. Jason Witt of Air1 called it a "powerful ballad" that encourages believers to choose praise even in chaos. Williams noted the song's significance as a milestone in Daigle's career, calling it a "capstone on the first 10 years" of her artistry and praising its "flawless, sincere delivery".

=== Commercial ===
"Let It Be a Hallelujah" debuted at number 16 on the Billboard Hot Christian Songs chart for the week of August 16, 2025, supported by an appearance at number 7 on the Christian Digital Song Sales chart that same week. The following week, the song entered into the Christian Airplay chart at number 26, and in the week succeeding that it entered the Christian Adult Contemporary chart at number 29. Over the span of six months, "Let It Be a Hallelujah" went on to top the Christian Airplay and Christian Adult Contemporary charts, while reaching a high of number 9 on the Hot Christian Songs chart.

=== Accolades ===
At the fourteenth annual New Release Today We Love Awards, "World on Fire" received three nominations, including Song of the Year, Pop Song of the Year, and Music Video of the Year. The results are scheduled for announcement on 22 March 2026. In 2026, Air1 listed "Let It Be a Hallelujah" at number 7 on their list of "7 Songs for Calming Anxiety". Later that year, Crosswalk.com listed the song at number 2 on their list of "Today's Top 10 Most Popular Contemporary Christian Songs".

Year	Organization	Category	Result	Ref.
2025	We Love Awards	Worship Song of the Year	Won	
2026	K-Love Fan Awards	Song of the Year	Nominated	
2026	Dove Awards	Pop/Contemporary Song of the Year	Pending	

== Track listing ==
No.	Title	Length
1.	"Let It Be a Hallelujah"	3:58
2.	"Let It Be a Hallelujah" (live)	4:07
Total length:		8:05

== Personnel ==
Credits adapted from Tidal.

- Austin Davis – producer, drums, percussion, programming
- Busbee – writer
- Cara Fox – cello
- Cory Pierce – electric guitar
- Dan Mackenzie – bass
- Devonne Fowlkes – choir
- Eleonore Denig – violin
- Grant Pittman – organ, piano
- Jase Keithley – engineer
- Jason Eskridge – choir
- Jonas Myrin – writer
- Kiley Phillips – choir
- Lauren Daigle – writer, vocals
- Sean Moffitt – engineer, mixer
- Will Merrell – choir

== Charts ==
=== Weekly ===
Weekly chart performance for "Let It Be a Hallelujah"
Chart (2025–2026)	Peak position
US Hot Christian Songs (Billboard)	9
US Christian Airplay (Billboard)	1

=== Year-end ===
Year-end chart performance for "Let It Be a Hallelujah"
Chart (2025)	Position
US Hot Christian Songs (Billboard)	80

== Release history ==
Release history and formats for "Let It Be a Hallelujah"
Region	Date	Format(s)	Label(s)	Ref.
United States	July 31, 2025	Christian adult contemporary radio; Christian contemporary hit radio	Centricity Music	
Various	August 1, 2025	Digital download; streaming	Centricity Music	
