= Ian Yates =

British Christian musician

- Also known as: World Famous
- Born: Ian Stephen Yates; 17 September
- Origin: Liverpool, North West England
- Genres: CCM, rock, alternative rock, worship, pop rock
- Occupations: Singer, songwriter
- Instruments: vocals, singer-songwriter
- Years active: 2007–present
- Labels: Survivor, 7Core
- Member of: Elim Sound
- Website: ianyatesmusic.com

Ian Stephen Yates (born 17 September) is a British Christian musician, who primarily plays a contemporary Christian and Christian alternative rock style of worship music. He has released one independent album Desperate to See Your Glory in 2007, and six studio albums, The Hope and the Glory in 2010, Good News in 2012, DNA in 2014, Awaken to Love in 2016, Mystery in 2020 and Between The Joy And The Sorrow in 2022. There has been four extended plays released from him, Really Good News in 2013, Spinning in 2014, a DNA one, in 2015 and Deconstruction, Vol.1 in 2019.

== Early life ==
Ian Stephen Yates is from Liverpool, and is the preacher's son from Bootle Elim Pentecostal Church.

== Music career ==
Yates' music career commenced in 2007, with the release, Desperate to See Your Glory, that was independently released by the artist himself. His first studio album, The Hope and the Glory, was released on 16 May 2010, with Survivor Records.

The subsequent release, Good News, was released by 7Core Music, on 24 June 2012. He released two extended plays after this with 7Core Music, Really Good News, in 2013, and Spinning, in 2014, both from 7Core Music. His next studio album, DNA, was released on 21 July 2014, by 7Core Music. The album was followed-up by an extended play of the same title, in 2015 with 7Core Music. in 2016 he released Awaken to Love, which included co-writes with Matt Redman (No Longer I) and Nick Herbert (High Wire). 2020 saw the release of Mystery, and Between The Joy And The Sorrow was released in 2022.

== Personal life ==
He is married to Kate, and they reside in Liverpool, with their children, and Yates is part of the Elim Sound worship group.

== Discography ==
=== Independent albums ===
- Desperate to See Your Glory (2007)

=== Studio albums ===
- The Hope and the Glory (16 May 2010, Survivor)
- Good News (24 June 2012, 7Core)
- DNA (21 July 2014, 7Core)
- Awaken to Love (17 Sept 2016, 7Core)
- Mystery (3 April 2020, 7Core)
- Between The Joy And The Sorrow (Part 1: 24 June 2022, Part 2: 30 Sept 2022 7Core)

=== EPs ===
- Really Good News (2013, 7Core)
- Spinning (2014, 7Core)
- DNA (2015, 7Core)
- Deconstruction, Vol.1 (2019 7Core)
