= DNA (Ian Yates album) =

Studio album by Ian Yates
- Released: 21 July 2014
- Genre: CCM, rock, alternative rock, worship, pop rock
- Length: 40:33
- Label: 7Core

Ian Yates chronology
Good News (2012)	DNA (2014)

DNA is the third studio album by Ian Yates. 7 Core Music released the album on 21 July 2014.

== Critical reception ==
Professional ratings
Review scores
Source	Rating
CCM Magazine	3/5 stars
Christian Review Magazine	4.5/5 stars
Cross Rhythms	9/10 squares
Jesus Wired	8/10 stars
Louder Than the Music	5/5 stars
New Release Today	4/5 stars

Awarding the album three stars from CCM Magazine, Matt Conner states, "DNA features several straightforward originals that speak to typical themes, but congregations should find several songs to appreciate". Tony Cummings, rating the album a nine out of ten at Cross Rhythms, writes, "This is one of their best." Giving the album four stars for New Release Today, Christopher Thiessen describes, "DNA is a great worship experience that will lead listeners to worship God throughout the entirety of the album." Dave Wood, awarding the album four stars from Louder Than the Music, says, "'DNA' is an inspired, innovative album, polished and sparkling, bursting full of energy, and with a heartfelt passion that is both infectious and appealing." Rating the album an eight out of ten for Jesus Wired, Rebekah Joy states, "DNA is a great album that will be loved by many". Leah St. John, giving the album four and a half stars at Christian Review Magazine, writes, "[It] is a great release that brings 80's synth and alternative rock together in a way that will help redefine and alter the DNA of worship, making it more accessible to a modern audience."

== Track listing ==
Track listing
No.	Title	Length
1.	"Freedom Song"	3:11
2.	"The First Day"	3:29
3.	"Christ in Me"	4:18
4.	"Innocent"	3:28
5.	"Fullness"	2:50
6.	"God I Need You"	4:40
7.	"Rescued Me"	3:48
8.	"We Remember"	4:03
9.	"Spinning"	3:33
10.	"We Enjoy You"	3:40
11.	"We Stand"	3:33
Total length:		40:33
