= The Answer to the Question =

Studio album by Tree63
- Released: March 9, 2004
- Studios: West Main Studios and Bridge Street Studios (Franklin, Tennessee)
- Genre: Contemporary Christian Music
- Producers: Jason Burkum: Nathan Dantzler; Joe Baldridge; John Ellis

Tree63 chronology
| The Life and Times of Absolute Truth (2002) | The Answer to the Question (2004) | Worship Volume One: I Stand For You (2005) |

The Answer to the Question is Tree63's third album. The original version contains ten tracks; a later released expanded edition contains five additional tracks.

== Track listing ==
All songs written by John Ellis, except where noted.

1. "King" - 3:49
2. "Blessed Be Your Name" (Matt Redman, Beth Redman) - 3:49
3. "You Only" - 2:32
4. "The Answer to the Question" - 3:04
5. "I Stand for You" - 3:44
6. "Over and Over Again" - 3:24
7. "So Glad" - 2:52
8. "But Now My Eyes Are Open" - 3:04
9. "Let Your Day Begin" - 3:40
10. "Overdue" - 3:00
11. "Maker of All Things" (New Expanded Edition Track) (Tim Hughes) - 3:10
12. "Paradise" (New EE Track) - 3:18
13. "All Because" (Expanded Edition Acoustic Version) - 3:56
14. "King" (EE Acoustic Version) - 3:05
15. "You Only" (EE Acoustic Version) - 2:18

== Personnel ==
Tree63

- John Ellis – vocals, keyboards, acoustic piano, guitars
- Daniel Ornelles – bass
- Theunis Odendaal – drums

Additional musicians

- Nathan Dantzler – programming
- Jeff Frankenstein – keyboards
- Peter Furler – guitars, percussion, backing vocals
- Phil Joel – backing vocals

=== Production ===
- Steve Ford – executive producer
- Peter Furler – executive producer
- Jason Burkum – producer (1, 3–10), additional engineer (1, 3–10), editing (1, 3–10)
- Nathan Dantzler – producer (1, 3–10), engineer (1, 3–10), mixing (1, 3–10), editing (1, 3–10)
- Joe Baldridge – producer (2), engineer (2), mixing (2)
- John Ellis – producer (2), engineer (2), mixing (2)
- Mac Hatton – editing (1, 3–10)
- Richard Dodd – mastering at Vital Recordings (Nashville, Tennessee)
- Christiév Carothers – creative director
- Anthony Ellis – art direction, cover design
- Kristin Barlowe – photography
