= Worship Volume One: I Stand for You =

Studio album by Tree63
- Released: November 22, 2005
- Recorded: Blazing Sound Studios; Bridge Street Studios
- Genre: Christian rock
- Length: 73.5
- Label: Inpop Records
- Producer: John Ellis; Jeremy Hunter; Bobby Blazier; Ted T

Tree63 chronology
The Answer to the Question (2004)	Worship Volume One: I Stand for You (2005)	Blessed Be Your Name: The Hits (2008)

Worship Volume One: I Stand For You is Tree63's fourth album. It features 5 new songs, 4 live recording off Tree63 songs, a cover of Matt Redman's Nothing But The Blood, new versions of "I Stand For You" and "Have You Way" and a live recording of John Newton's Amazing Grace.

== Track listing ==
1. "No Other"
2. "Treasure" (Live)
3. "I Will Never Be the Same"
4. "Joy" (Live)
5. "I Stand For You" (New Version)
6. "All Over the World"
7. "Lift"
8. "Nothing But the Blood"
9. "King" (Live)
10. "Have Your Way" (New Version, original from 63)
11. "Great Kindness"
12. "Look What You've Done" (Live)
13. "Amazing Grace" (Live)
