= 1ST (SixTones album) =

Studio album by SixTones
- Released: January 6, 2021
- Recorded: 2020
- Genres: Rock; hip hop; R&B; pop; EDM
- Languages: Japanese; English
- Label: Sony Japan

SixTones chronology
1ST (2021)	City (2022)

Singles from 1ST
- 1. "Imitation Rain" Released: January 22, 2020; 2. "Navigator" Released: July 22, 2020; 3. "New Era" Released: November 11, 2020

1ST is the debut studio album by the Japanese boy band SixTones. The album was first released through Sony Music Entertainment Japan on January 6, 2021, in three versions: the Rough Stone edition, the Tone Colors edition (both of which are first press editions), as well as a regular edition. The album topped both the Oricon Albums Chart and Billboard Japan Hot Albums chart, selling over 467,000 copies in Japan in its first week. It has since been certified double platinum by the RIAJ.

== Release ==
The album's first press edition was released in two versions: the "Rough Stone Edition" and "Tone Colors Edition", the names of which come from the origin of SixTones' name. The album's lead song "ST" was called an "emotional" and "loud" rock song about people exceeding their own limits. The "Rough Stone edition" includes the studio versions of the group's original five pre-debut songs. The group was divided into duo units for songs on the "Tone Colors edition" and recorded three different genre songs. The regular edition includes two additional songs, including a popular coupling song that was included on "Imitation Rain/D.D.", their first single, as well as a remix of the song "Telephone". Beside the lead song, the unit songs also include a music video.

=== Songs ===
1ST includes three of the group's previously released singles: "Imitation Rain", "Navigator", and "New Era". "Imitation Rain" is the group's debut single and also includes a single by Snow Man, another group under Johnny & Associates' who debuted the same day as SixTones. The song was composed by Yoshiki. The single sold more than one million copies. "Navigator" was used as the opening theme of anime series The Millionaire Detective Balance: Unlimited. "New Era" was used as the opening theme of anime series Yashahime: Princess Half-Demon. The album features a mix of rock, hip-hop, R&B, pop, and EDM. The "rough stone edition" includes 15 songs, including SixTones' original pre-debut songs previously performed live.

== Track listing ==
1ST – Standard edition
No.	Title	Lyrics	Music	Arrangement	Length
1.	"ST"	Sorari Matsubara	Kengo Minamida	Kengo Minamida	4:45
2.	"Navigator"	Seiji Takagi	Seiji Takagi; Kokei Takafumi	Kokei Takafumi; Daisuke Madowaki	4:05
3.	"Special Order"	Atsushi Shimabara	Albin Nordqvist	Albin Nordqvist	3:06
4.	"New Era"	Page Grace; Dr. Loui; Naoki Itai	Naoki Itai; MEG	Naoki Itai; MEG	3:52
5.	"Curtain Call"	Ryo'LEFTY'Miyata	Mattias Olofsson; Anders Dannvik; Ryo'LEFTY'Miyata	Ryo'LEFTY'Miyata	3:42
6.	"Dance All Night"	Komei Kobayashi	Jan Baars; Rajan Muse; Ronnie Icon; Susumu Kawaguchi	Jan Baars; Rajan Muse	4:16
7.	"S.I.X"	Toru Ishikawa	Toru Ishikawa; Joe Ogawa	Joe Ogawa	3:30
8.	"Coffee & Cream"	Tsugumi; Tomoko Ida	Tsugumi; Tomoko Ida	Tsugumi; Tomoko Ida	3:39
9.	"Imitation Rain"	Yoshiki	Yoshiki	Yoshiki	5:17
10.	"Lifetime"	Komei Kobayashi	Christoffer Semelius; Jimmy Claeson	Christoffer Semelius	4:21

1ST – Rough stone edition (bonus tracks)
No.	Title	Lyrics	Music	Arrangement	Length
11.	"Kono Hoshi no Hikari" (この星のHIKARI)	Susumu Kawaguchi	Susumu Kawaguchi	Susumu Kawaguchi; Dele Ladimeji	4:06
12.	"Be Crazy"	ma-saya	Steven Lee	Steven Lee; Shuko Tateyama	3:24
13.	""Laugh" In the Life"	Gaku	Gaku	Gaku	3:41
14.	"Rollin'"	Yocke	Yocke	Yocke	4:27
15.	"Ram-Pam-Pam"	Onigashima	Scott Russell Stoddart; Warren David Meyers; Mark Angelico Thomson	Scott Russell Stoddart	3:42

1ST – Tone edition (bonus tracks)
No.	Title	Lyrics	Music	Arrangement	Length
11.	"Extra VIP" (Jesse & Juri Tanaka duet song)	Page Grace; Kanata Okajima	Andreas Oberg; Ninos Hanna; Willie Weeks	Willie Weeks	3:05
12.	"My Hometown" (Kochi Yugo & Shintaro Morimoto duet song)	Shinkō Ogura	Chris Meyer; Stefan Ekstedt; Samuel Waermo	Carlos K.	3:38
13.	"Tte Anata" (ってあなた, Taiga Kyomoto & Hokuto Matsumura duet song)	Yūsuke Saeki	Yūsuke Saeki	Yūsuke Saeki	4:53

1ST – Standard edition (bonus tracks)
No.	Title	Lyrics	Music	Arrangement	Length
11.	"Uyamuya" (うやむや)	Kōdai Iwatsubo	Kōdai Iwatsubo; Seiji Iwasaki	Kōdai Iwatsubo; Seiji Iwasaki	3:34
12.	"Mad Love"	Onigashima	Takuya Harada; Christoffer Semelius; Jimmy Claeson	Christoffer Semelius	3:18
13.	"Telephone" (1ST Remix)	Onigashima	Justin Trugman; Jason Parris; Drew Ryan Scott	Jason Parris	4:29

== Charts ==
Chart performance for 1ST
Chart (2021)	Peak position
Japanese Albums (Oricon)	1
Japanese Combined Albums (Oricon)	1
Japanese Hot Albums (Billboard Japan)	1

== Certifications ==
Certifications for 1ST
Region	Certification	Certified units/sales
Japan (RIAJ)	2× Platinum	500,000^{^}
^{^} Shipments figures based on certification alone.
