= Tree63 (album) =

Studio album by Tree63
- Released: October 24, 2000
- Genre: Christian rock
- Length: 40:53
- Label: Inpop
- Producer: Andrew Phillip: E.H. Holden

Tree63 chronology
63 (1999)	Tree63 (2000)	The Life and Times of Absolute Truth (2002)

Professional ratings
Review scores
Source	Rating
Jesus Freak Hideout	2.5/5 stars

Tree63 is Tree63's third album, released on October 24, 2000. It features songs from the first two studio albums Overflow and 63. Joy and Worldwide were originally released on Overflow, the remaining tracks were originally released on 63.

== Track listing ==
All songs written by John Ellis, except where noted.

1. "Treasure" - 3:57
2. "Joy" - 3:46
3. "Look What You've Done" - 4:34
4. "Sacrifice" - 4:24
5. "Earnestly" - 3:36
6. "Anthem" - 4:30
7. "A Million Lights" - 4:06
8. "1*0*1*" (T.C. Ellis) - 4:57
9. "Can I See Your Face?" - 3:02
10. "Worldwide" (John Ellis, Jon Randall, Darryl Swart) - 4:04

== Personnel ==
Tree63

- John Ellis – vocals, keyboards, guitars
- Martin Engel – bass, backing vocals
- Darryl Swart – drums, percussion, backing vocals

== See also ==
Tree63

Christian rock
