= 10,000 Reasons (album) =

Studio album by Matt Redman
- Released: 12 July 2011
- Genres: CCM, worship
- Label: Kingsway Music
- Producer: Nathan Nockels

Matt Redman chronology
Ultimate Collection (2010)	10,000 Reasons (2011)	Your Grace Finds Me (2013)

Singles from 10,000 Reasons
- 1. "Never Once" Released: 3 June 2011; 2. "10,000 Reasons (Bless The Lord)" Released: 24 May 2012

10,000 Reasons is a live album by worship artist Matt Redman. It peaked on the US Christian Album chart at No. 1 and No. 149 on the UK charts.

== Track listing ==
Album release
No.	Title	Writer(s)	Length
1.	"We Are the Free"	Jonas Myrin, Matt Redman	4:02
2.	"Here for You"	Matt Maher, Redman, Jesse Reeves, Tim Wanstall	5:57
3.	"Holy"	Jason Ingram, Myrin, Redman	7:13
4.	"10,000 Reasons (Bless the Lord)"	Myrin, Redman	5:42
5.	"Fires"	Myrin, Redman	5:01
6.	"Never Once"	Ingram, Redman, Wanstall	4:32
7.	"Where Would We Be"	Ingram, Myrin, Redman	5:48
8.	"We Could Change the World"	Ingram, Myrin, Redman	4:27
9.	"Magnificent"	Myrin, Redman	5:02
10.	"O This God"	Myrin, Redman	4:59
11.	"Endless Hallelujah"	Myrin, Redman, Chris Tomlin, Wanstall	7:06
Total length:			59:49

== Personnel ==
- Matt Redman – lead vocals
- Nathan Nockels – keyboards, programming, acoustic guitar, electric guitar, backing vocals
- Bryan Brown – acoustic guitar, backing vocals
- Tyler Burkum – electric guitar
- Matt Podelsa – electric guitar
- Jon Duke – bass
- Jacob Arnold – drums
- Claire Indie – cello
- Jules Adekambi – backing vocals
- Jonas Myrin – backing vocals
- Beth Redman – backing vocals
- Katie Ashworth – additional vocals
- Morgan Blake – additional vocals
- Daniel Carson – additional vocals
- Katie Corven – additional vocals
- Kayla Johnson – additional vocals
- Stan Johnson – additional vocals
- Ji Lee – additional vocals
- Melodie Malone – additional vocals
- J. D. Meyers – additional vocals
- Travis Nunn – additional vocals
- John Pritchard – additional vocals
- Jennifer Richards – additional vocals
- Christoffer Wadensten – additional vocals
- David Williams – additional vocals

== Production ==
- Louie Giglio – executive producer
- Shelley Giglio – executive producer
- Brad O'Donnell – executive producer
- Nathan Nockels – producer, overdub recording
- Jim Dineen – recording
- Christoffer Wadensten – additional vocal engineer
- Ainslie Grosser – mixing
- Hank Williams – mastering at MasterMix (Nashville, Tennessee)
- Jess Chambers – A&R administration
- Mike McCloskey – A&R administration
- Leighton Ching – art direction, design

== Charts ==
Chart performance for 10,000 Reasons
Chart (2011–13)	Peak position
UK Albums Chart	149
US Billboard 200	60
US Top Christian Albums (Billboard)	1

== Certifications ==
Region	Certification	Certified units/sales
United States (RIAA)	Gold	500,000^{‡}
^{‡} Sales+streaming figures based on certification alone.
