= Veritas (band) =

American classical crossover quintlet

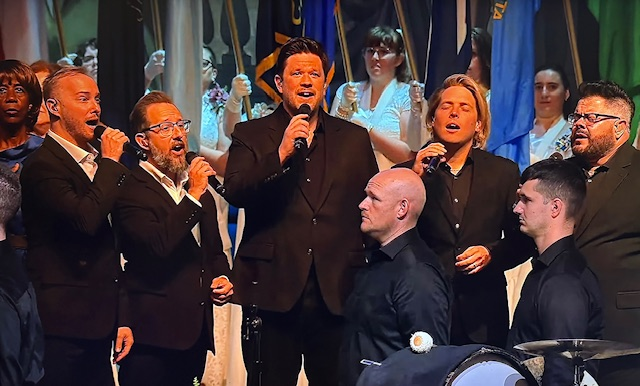
- Veritas performing at DAR Constitution Hall in 2025

Background information
- Origin: United States
- Genres: Classical crossover, operatic pop, Christian
- Years active: 2012–present
- Labels: Fair Trade Services
- Members: Jeff Anderson; James Berrian; Andrew Goodwin; Jordan Johnson; Lucas Scott Lawrence

Veritas is an American classical crossover vocal quintet who started making music in 2012 and have released one album, Veritas, through the Fair Trade Services label. The album contains a variety of traditional repertoire, musical theater, pop, and a few original pieces.

== Members ==
- Jeff Anderson - tenor
- James Berrian - baritone
- Andrew Goodwin - tenor
- Jordan Johnson - tenor
- Lucas Scott Lawrence - bass

== Songs ==
- "Agnus Dei Medley"
- "You'll Never Walk Alone"
- "Dare You to Move"
- "Love Of My Life"
- "I Can Only Imagine"
- "The Hand That Holds The Storm"
- "American Anthology"
- "10,000 Reasons"
- "If You're Out There"
- "The Lord's Prayer"

== Discography ==
List of studio albums, with selected chart positions
Title	Album details	Peak chart positions		
Title	Album details	US Christ	US Class	US Heat
Veritas	Released: September 9, 2014; Label: Fair Trade Services; Format: CD, digital download	39	4	35
