= Where Angels Fear to Tread (Matt Redman album) =

Studio album by Matt Redman
- Released: 2002
- Recorded: 2002
- Studio: Sonikwire Studios (Irvine, California); Rythmic West (Pasadena, California); Rythmic East and IHOF Studios (Nashville, Tennessee)
- Genre: Worship
- Length: 53:01
- Label: Survivor
- Producer: Rythmic (Jason Halbert and Dwayne Larring)

Matt Redman chronology
The Father's Song (2000)	Where Angels Fear to Tread (2002)	FaceDown (2004)

Professional ratings
Review scores
Source	Rating
Cross Rhythms	10/10 squares
Jesus Freak Hideout	4/5 stars

Where Angels Fear to Tread is a studio album by worship artist Matt Redman.

== Track listing ==
All songs written by Matt Redman, except where noted.

1. "Amazing" – 3:05
2. "Blessed Be Your Name" (Matt Redman, Beth Redman) – 5:06
3. "Befriended" – 4:53
4. "When My Heart Runs Dry" – 5:22
5. "Making Melody" – 4:27
6. "Call To Worship" – 4:40
7. "Rejoice With Trembling" – 5:14
8. "The Promise of Your Cross" – 4:08
9. "Wonderful Maker" (Matt Redman, Chris Tomlin) – 4:58
10. "Lord, Let Your Glory Fall" – 5:10
11. "Where Angels Fear to Tread" (Matt Redman, Tom Lane) – 5:54

== Personnel ==
- Matt Redman – lead vocals
- Rythmic (Jason Halbert and Dwayne Larring) – keyboards, programming, guitars, additional bass, backing vocals
- Mike Busbee – additional keyboards, programming, guitars, bass, backing vocals
- Dana Weaver – additional guitars (1)
- Eli Thompson – bass
- David Raven – drums
- John Catchings – cello
- David Davidson – violin
- John Mark Painter – string arrangements
- Kendall Payne – backing vocals (3)

Group vocals

- Esther Alexander
- Andy Argunda
- Mark Beswick
- Lou Fellingham
- James Gregory
- Brenden Guyatt
- Priscilla Jones Campbell

Various voices on "Making Melody"

- Raquel D'Olivera (Brazil)
- Rhona Armstrong-Abudu (Caribbean)
- Shelley-Ann Sydial (Caribbean)
- Eike Albert (Germany)
- Siu Mui Lam (Hong Kong)
- Yoon Park (Korea)
- Philip Beccles (Liberia)
- Felicia Hidajat (Malaysia)
- Dimeji Onabanjo (Nigeria)
- Tosin Okusanya (Nigeria)
- Johnny Larring (Norway)
- Ruth Larring (Norway)
- Simon Soderstroin (Sweden)
- Dave Wellington (UK)

Production

- John Hartley – executive producer
- Les Moir – executive producer
- Rythmic – producers, engineers
- Mike Busbee – engineer, mixing at The Manor (Los Angeles, California)
- Neil Costello – engineer (group vocals)
- Ken Love – mastering at MasterMix (Nashville, Tennessee)
- Christiév Carothers – creative direction
- Jan Cook – art direction
- Benji Peck – art direction, design
- Brandon Dickerson – photography
