= The Friendship and the Fear =

The Friendship And The Fear

Studio album by Matt Redman
- Released: 1997
- Recorded: ???
- Studio: Curtis Schwartz Studios (Surrey, England): Penn Farm Studios (UK); West Park Studios (Littlehampton, England)
- Genre: Worship
- Length: 73:17
- Label: Survivor, Star Song
- Producer: Andy Piercy: Martin Smith

Matt Redman chronology
Passion For Your Name (1995)	The Friendship And The Fear (1997)	Intimacy (1998)

The Friendship And The Fear is an album by worship artist Matt Redman.

AllMusic stated in its review of the album, "Redman, whose voice resembles Martin Smith's from Delirious?, offers a style that combines praise and worship with CCM."

The original album was produced by Andy Piercy and recorded at various locations:

- Curtis Schwartz Studios, Surrey, England – (Engineer: Curtis Schwartz).
- Penn Farm Studios, ?, England – (Engineer: Curtis Schwartz, for "The Way of the Cross").

== Track listing ==
All songs written by Matt Redman, except where noted.

The Friendship and the Fear track listing
No.	Title	Length
1.	"There Is a Louder Shout to Come"	5:24
2.	"Believer"	4:34
3.	"Bowing Down"	5:04
4.	"Deep Calls to Deep"	6:32
5.	"Pure, Pure Heart"	6:23
6.	"Knocking on the Door of Heaven" (written by Matt Redman and Steve Cantellow)	5:51
7.	"Once Again"	6:32
8.	"Can I Ascend"	5:49
9.	"Can We Walk Upon the Water"	6:01
10.	"The Way of the Cross"	5:00
11.	"I Need to Get the Fire Back"	5:10
12.	"The Yoke Is Easy"	4:39
13.	"The Friendship and the Fear"	6:18
Total length:		78:17

=== StarSong US release ===
For the US release although the name was the same this is almost a different album. However the track listing is somewhat different, combining songs from the UK release and his earlier album, Passion For Your Name. Some believe this to be a rather uncomfortable blend of styles and prefer to UK releases as a result.

The Friendship and the Fear (StarSong US release) track listing
No.	Title	Length
1.	"Believer"	4:34
2.	"Knocking on the Door of Heaven"	5:49
3.	"There Is a Louder Shout to Come"	6:00
4.	"I Will Offer Up My Life"	5:01
5.	"The Way of the Cross"	4:57
6.	"It's Rising Up"	7:19
7.	"Bowing Down"	5:02
8.	"The Cross Has Said It All"	3:54
9.	"Once Again"	6:30
10.	"Friend of Sinners"	3:09
11.	"Can I Ascend"	5:51
12.	"The Friendship and the Fear"	4:30
13.	"Better Is One Day"	6:23
Total length:		69:59

== Personnel ==
- Matt Redman – lead vocals, guitars
- Steve Cantellow – keyboards, additional backing vocals
- Paul Carrack – keyboards, backing vocals (4) (US release)
- Richard Causon – keyboards
- Mark Edwards – keyboards
- Stuart Townend – keyboards
- Craig Borlase – guitars
- Dan Boreham – guitars
- Dave Clifton – guitars, mandolin
- Stuart Garrard – guitars
- Bryn Haworth – guitars
- Martin Smith – guitars
- Jim Bryan – bass
- Andy Coughlin – bass
- Paul Lancaster – bass
- Dudley Phillips – bass
- Colin Brookes – drums, percussion, additional backing vocals
- Phil Crabbe – drums, percussion
- Martin Neil – drums, percussion, drum programming
- Curtis Schwartz – drum programming, additional backing vocals
- Mike Sturgis – drums, percussion
- Andy Piercy – tambourine, additional backing vocals
- Steve Gregory – soprano saxophone
- Helen Burgess – backing vocals
- Kaz Lewis – backing vocals
- Esther Pratt – backing vocals
- Stephen Quashie – backing vocals (6, 11)
- Vanessa Freeman – backing vocals (8, 13) (US release)
- Soul Survivor crowd – additional backing vocals

== Production ==
- John Mays – executive producer (US release)
- Les Moir – executive producer
- Andy Piercy – producer
- Martin Smith – producer (4, 6, 8, 10), recording (4, 6, 8, 10) (US release)
- Curtis Schwartz – recording, mixing
- Denis Blackham – mastering at Country Masters (Surrey, UK)
- Ken Love – mastering at MasterMix (Nashville, Tennessee) (US release)
- Christiév Carothers – creative director (US release)
- Jan Cook – art direction (US release)
- Dan Harding – design (US release)
- Paul Yates – photography (US release)

== Release details ==
- 1997, UK, Survivor Records SURCD001, Release Date ? ? 1997, CD
- 1998, USA, Star Song 724382017523, Release Date 27 January 1998, CD
- 2003, UK, Survivor Records SURCD092, Release Date 21 Mar 2003, CD (double CD with Intimacy)
