= Passion for Your Name =

Passion For Your Name

Studio album by Matt Redman
- Released: 1995
- Studio: West Park Studios (Littlehampton, UK)
- Genre: Contemporary Worship
- Length: 54:12
- Label: Kingsway Records
- Producer: Martin Smith

Matt Redman chronology
Wake Up My Soul (1993)	Passion For Your Name (1995)	The Friendship And The Fear (1997)

Passion For Your Name is an album by worship artist Matt Redman. This was his first album, following his debut Wake Up My Soul.His second album was The Friendship and the Fear

The album was recorded at West Park Studios in Littlehampton, England with audio engineer Martin Smith.

The song "Better Is One Day" may concern a mystical experience—the Most Holy Trinity Inhabitation, mystical experience of many saints which perceive the physical, real and alive Presence of God in their heart. "For here my heart is satisfied within your presence"—the author wishes himself to die in order to see and experience God again in Paradise, his house and court, or "come once again to me", because "I've tasted and I've seen".

== Track listing ==
All songs written by Matt Redman, except where noted.

1. "It's Rising Up" (Redman, Martin Smith) – 7:12
2. "The Cross Has Said It All" (Redman, Smith) – 3:41
3. "I Will Offer Up My Life" – 5:02
4. "Surely The Time Has Come" – 6:06
5. "Jesus, Is This Song of Love" – 3:35
6. "The Happy Song" (Smith) – 4:13
7. "Turned Me Around" – 5:23
8. "This Means I Love You" – 3:25
9. "Friend of Sinners" – 3:08
10. "Fill Us Up And Send Us Out" – 3:20
11. "Rags To Riches" – 3:08
12. "Better Is One Day" – 5:59

== Personnel ==
- Matt Redman – lead vocals, acoustic guitar
- Richard Causon – keyboards, Hammond organ, accordion
- Stuart Townend – additional keyboards
- Tim Jupp – acoustic piano (5, 6)
- Stuart Garrard – electric guitars, group vocals (1)
- Bryn Haworth – National acoustic guitar, additional electric guitars, lap steel guitar, acoustic guitars (5, 9)
- Martin Smith – mandolin, backing vocals, group vocals
- Andy Coughlan – bass (1–5, 7–12)
- Les Driscoll – bass (6)
- Martin Neil – drums (1–5, 7–12), percussion, drum programming
- Stewart Smith – drums (6)
- Graham Ord – harmonica
- Chris Haigh – violin
- Helen Burgess – backing vocals
- Jussy McLean – group vocals (1)
- Vanessa Freeman – backing vocals (2, 5, 12)
- Paul Carrack – backing vocals (3, 7, 10)

== Production ==
- Les Moir – executive producer
- Mike Pilavachi – executive producer
- David Pytches – executive producer
- Martin Smith – producer, recording, mixing
- Tim Jupp – additional engineer
- James Kessell – art direction, design
- Paul Yates – photography

== Release details ==
- 1995, UK, Kingsway Records KMCD857, Release Date ? ? 1995, CD
- 2000, UK, Survivor Records SURCD040, Release Date 21 July 2000, CD (double CD with "Wake Up My Soul")
