= Tree63 =

South African rock band

- Origin: Durban, South Africa
- Genres: Rock; contemporary rock; contemporary Christian rock
- Years active: 1996–2009; 2014–2015; 2024–present
- Labels: InPop; Survivor
- Members: John Ellis; Angus Warden; Deon Knipe
- Past members: Darryl Swart; Daniel Ornellas; Jon Randall; Martin Engel; Thinus Odendaal

Tree63 is a South African three-piece rock band from Durban, South Africa.

== History ==
=== 1996–2000: Formation and initial years ===
The band was formed in 1996 and originally, it was unnamed. In 1997, the band had to come up with a name before performing at North Beach, Durban, and came up with "Tree". They added the "63" part of their name in 2000 due to a naming conflict with an American band. 63 had been the name of their second album, which was named in reference to Psalm 63.

'We were originally just "Tree", after the numerous references in the Bible to trees: the garden of Eden, the cross Jesus hung on etc. "63" was the title of our second record, and it came from Psalm 63. When we got to the States in 2000, we discovered a band in Boston called "Tree" already, and they were unwilling to give up their band name, so we had to either alter or change ours. The compromise was "Tree63".'

— John Ellis, Interview with Christian Music Daily

=== 2001–2009: Popularity and move to America ===
Their first album released in the United States, Tree63, won the GMA Dove Award for Rock Album of the Year in 2001.

Tree63's recording of Matt Redman's "Blessed Be Your Name" peaked at number 2 on the US Billboard Christian Songs chart, and helped to spark the song's popularity. This recording was featured on the 2005 edition of WOW Hits and was nominated for two Dove Awards. On a 2 February 2007 broadcast of 20, The Countdown Magazine (special edition, Praise and Worship), guest Chris Tomlin described Tree63's rendition of "Blessed Be Your Name" as "...the definitive recording of one of the most all-encompassing songs in the entire world of Christian music." The song was then announced as the number 3 Praise and Worship song of all time.

Tree63 parted ways in 2009, and John Ellis returned to South Africa, where he started his solo career. His debut solo album, Come Out Fighting, was released in June 2010.

=== 2014–2015: Reunion with Ornellas and Swart ===
Splashy Fen Music Festival announced that Tree63 would be part of their line-up in 2014.

In November 2014, Tree63 released previously unreleased songs from 2006 which were recorded during the sessions for their Sunday! album.

After reconvening in 2014 for a series of celebratory South African concerts, talk of a new album and resumed live work resurfaced and the band began work on their new album in Nashville in November 2014. Land was released in November 2015.

=== 2024–2025: New members, shows and recording ===
In 2024, John Ellis relaunched the Tree63 brand with new members Angus Warden (drums, vocals) and Deon Knipe (bass, vocals), both accomplished and seasoned musicians.

The band is touring through 2025 and plans to record new material for global release in 2025–26.

== Band members ==
Current

- John Ellis — vocals, guitar, piano
- Angus Warden — drums, backing vocals
- Deon Knipe — bass, backing vocals

Former

- Darryl Swart — drums
- Daniel Ornellas — bass
- Thinus Odendaal — drums
- Jon Randall — bass
- Martin Engel — bass

== Discography ==
=== Studio albums ===
List of albums, with selected chart positions, sales and certifications
Title	Details	Peak positions	
Title	Details	US Christ.	US Heat.
Overflow (as "Tree")	Release date: 1997; Label: Independent; Formats: CD, digital download	—	—
63 (as "Tree")	Release date: 21 March 1999; Label: Kingsway Music; Formats: CD, digital download	—	—
Tree63	Release date: 24 October 2000; Label: Inpop Records; Formats: CD, digital download	—	—
The Life and Times of Absolute Truth	Release date: 22 October 2002; Label: Inpop Records; Formats: CD, digital download	—	—
The Answer to the Question	Release date: 9 March 2004; Label: Inpop Records; Formats: CD, digital download	32	29
Worship Volume One: I Stand For You	Release date: 22 November 2005; Label: Inpop Records; Formats: CD, digital download	—	—
Sunday	Release date: 25 September 2007; Label: Inpop Records; Formats: CD, digital download	32	47
Blessed Be Your Name: The Hits	Release date: 27 May 2008; Label: Inpop Records; Formats: CD, digital download	—	—
Land	Release date: 11 September 2015; Label: Fuel Records; Formats: CD, digital download	—	—
Voyage	Releasing: 26 June 2026; Label: Just Music; Formats: Digital download, streaming	To be released	

=== EP ===
- UNFINISHED DREAM – Songs from the Sunday Sessions

=== Singles ===
List of singles, with selected chart positions, showing year released and album name
Year	Title	Peak positions		Album
Year	Title	US Christ.	US Christ. AC	Album
2002	"Be All End All"	—	—	The Life and Times Of Absolute Truth
2002	"Anxious Seat"	—	—	The Life and Times Of Absolute Truth
2004	"Blessed Be Your Name"	2	2	The Answer to the Question
2004	"King"	22	21	The Answer to the Question
2005	"Maker Of All Things"	33	33	The Answer to the Question
2006	"I Stand For You"	15	14	Worship Volume One: I Stand for You
2006	"All Over The World"	5	3	Worship Volume One: I Stand for You
2007	"Sunday"	14	12	Sunday
2015	"The Storm"	—	—	Land
2015	"Standing On It"	—	—	Land
2025	"How Much Longer"	—	—	Voyage
2026	"Voyage"	—	—	Voyage

== Awards ==
Tree63, won the GMA Dove Award for Rock Album of the Year in 2001.
