= Jonas Myrin =

Swedish musician

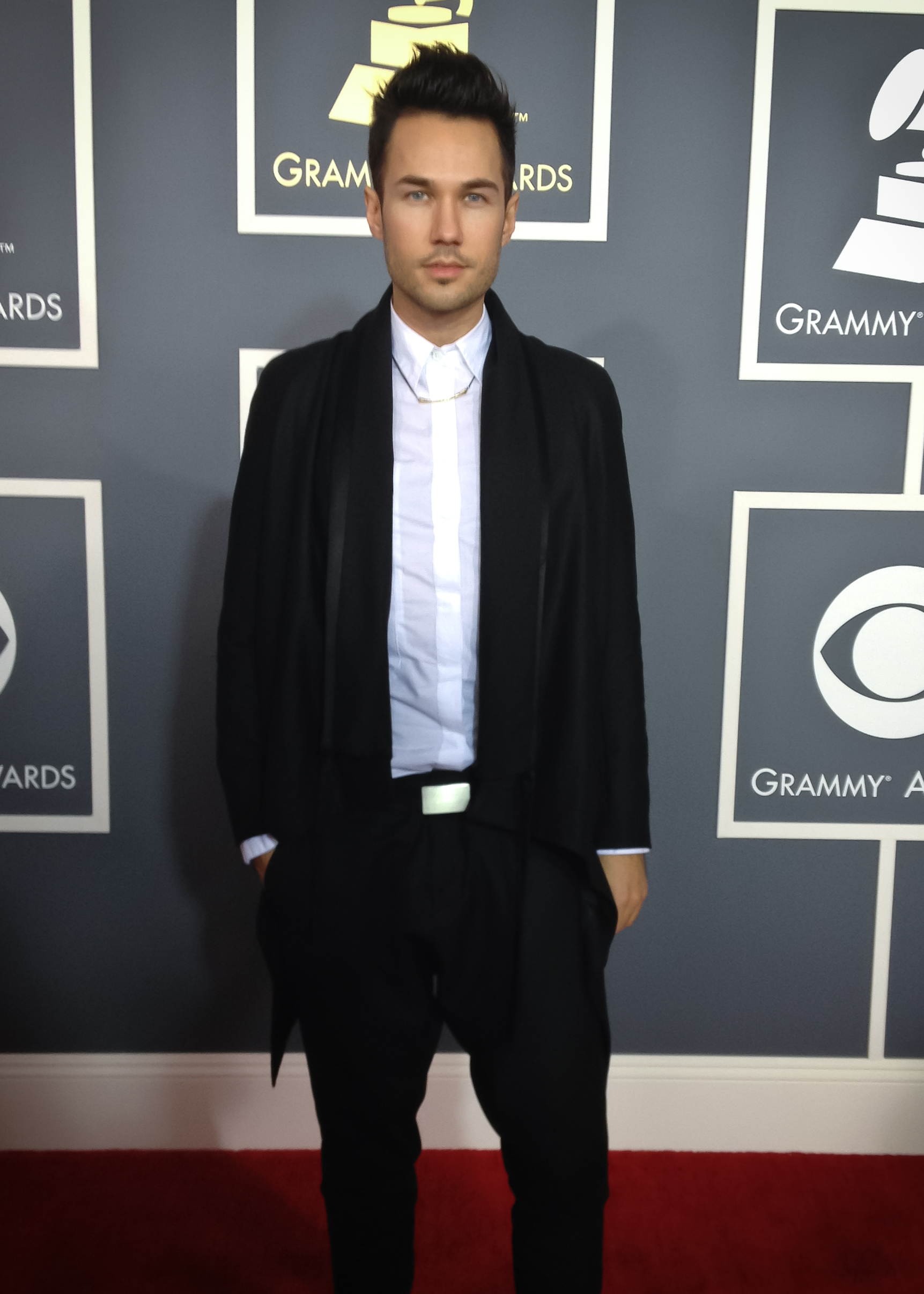

Background information
- Born: Jonas Myrin; 30 November 1982 (age 43); Örebro, Sweden
- Genres: Pop; rock; gospel; worship
- Occupations: Songwriter, musician, producer
- Instruments: Vocals, piano, guitar
- Years active: Early 2000s–present
- Website: jonasmyrin.com

Jonas Myrin (born 30 November 1982) is a Swedish singer, songwriter and producer based in Los Angeles, California. He won a Grammy Award for co-writing "10,000 Reasons (Bless the Lord)" with Matt Redman, as well as Billboard Music Awards and multiple Dove Awards. He has written songs for films, television and artists including Barbra Streisand, Idina Menzel, Andrea Bocelli, Céline Dion, Lauren Daigle, Nicole Scherzinger, John Legend, Tasha Cobbs Leonard and Delta Goodrem.

== Early life ==
Myrin grew up in Örebro, Sweden, where he began songwriting at an early age. His father, Ingemar Myrin, was a journalist and a prolific contributor to Hemmets Vän. Growing up, his parents shared their favourite music with him, including Stevie Wonder, The Beatles and Donny Hathaway, which he has cited as major influences on his work.

At 17, Myrin moved to London to study music and drama. While in London he played the lead role in a production of West Side Story, for which he was awarded the Hjalmar Berglund scholarship in Sweden in 2002. He also met Natasha Bedingfield, with whom he began a long-running creative collaboration. Although he received several record contract offers, he instead became a worship leader at Hillsong Church London, and co-wrote several songs that were featured on various albums by Hillsong Music. In the years that followed, he also wrote songs for artists including members of Supergrass, as well as Björn from Peter Bjorn and John, and Greg Kurstin, among others.

In 2002, he appeared in the music video for the Sophie Ellis-Bextor song "Get Over You".

Jonas's father died in 2020 from complications of COVID-19.

== Music career ==
=== 2007–2013: Breakthrough as a songwriter ===
In 2007, Myrin co-wrote "Yours" for Steven Curtis Chapman's album This Moment. The song spent twenty-six weeks on the Hot Christian Songs chart and won Song of the Year at the BMI Music Awards the following year.

Myrin wrote the song "Period" as the opening theme of the Japanese anime series Fullmetal Alchemist: Brotherhood. The song was performed by Japanese pop duo Chemistry and reached No. 12 on the Oricon weekly charts for eight consecutive weeks.

Together with John Hill, Myrin co-wrote "Run Run Run" and "A Little Too Much" for Natasha Bedingfield's album Strip Me (2010). "A Little Too Much" was later used as the end-title song for the Warner Bros. film Something Borrowed (2011). That same year, he co-wrote "Our God" for Chris Tomlin, which received a Grammy Award nomination and won both Dove and Billboard awards.

He co-wrote "10,000 Reasons (Bless the Lord)" with Matt Redman, who performed the song. The song was written in 2011, inspired by the opening verse of Psalm 103. It won two Grammy Awards at the 55th Annual Grammy Awards and remained at No. 1 on the Billboard Christian Songs chart for thirteen weeks.

Studies analysing Christian Copyright Licensing International (CCLI) charts for the 2010s found that the repertoire sung in churches worldwide is produced by a relatively small network of songwriters. One academic study comparing CCLI and PraiseCharts Top-100 worship-song lists between 2010 and 2020 identified 114 songs associated with only 43 songwriters or church groups.

Among the songs appearing most prominently in decade-long worship rankings was 10,000 Reasons (Bless the Lord), written by Jonas Myrin and Matt Redman, which was ranked the No. 1 worship song of the 2010s in aggregated worship-usage charts compiled from church licensing data.

The song was featured in the BBC Songs of Praise Top 100 Hymns poll and performed on the programme in January 2016, with Myrin credited as composer and lyricist.

In July 2012, Myrin released his debut solo single "Day of the Battle" on EMI Records, exclusively in the German-speaking markets of Germany, Switzerland and Austria, where it was certified gold in Germany. The single was followed by his debut album Dreams Plans Everything in August 2012. He toured with Katie Melua and performed on German television programmes including the ZDF Bauhaus show, the Goldene Henne Award ceremony and Der Fernsehgarten. On New Year's Eve 2012/13, he performed at the Brandenburg Gate alongside Pet Shop Boys, Bonnie Tyler and Loreen, in a concert broadcast nationally on ZDF.

=== 2016–2018: Major label collaborations ===
Myrin collaborated with Lauren Daigle on several songs, including "Loyal" in 2016. He co-wrote "Your Spirit" with Kim Walker-Smith, Matt Redman and Tasha Cobbs Leonard, which was recorded by Cobbs Leonard and propelled her album Heart.Passion.Pursuit to No. 1 on the Gospel Albums chart. A Portuguese version, "Teu Espírito", recorded by Walker-Smith and Gabriela Rocha, was subsequently released in Brazil.

In 2017, he wrote and performed "Sadness (Who's Laughing Now)" for the Sony Pictures film Rough Night.

In 2018, Myrin co-wrote "Great Things" with Phil Wickham for his album Living Hope, which received a Dove Award nomination for Worship Recorded Song of the Year in 2020. Later that year, he travelled to Rio de Janeiro as part of Universal Music Publishing Group's songwriter programme, collaborating with Vanessa da Mata, Ana Carolina and Antonio Villeroy.

Also in 2018, Myrin co-wrote and co-produced four songs on Barbra Streisand's album Walls, including "What's On Your Mind", "Don't Lie to Me", "The Rain Will Fall" and "Better Angels" (the latter produced by David Foster). Walls reached No. 6 on the Billboard 200 and was nominated for the Grammy Award for Best Traditional Pop Vocal Album at the 2020 Grammy Awards. Rolling Stone named it one of the 20 Best Pop Albums of 2018.

Myrin also worked with French singer Gaëtan Roussel on his album Traffic, co-writing and performing on several tracks including the single "Hope".

For Andrea Bocelli, Myrin co-wrote "Gloria the Gift of Life", which appeared on Bocelli's album Sì, the first classical album to reach No. 1 on the Billboard 200 in the United States and on the UK Albums Chart.

=== 2019–2020: Songwriters Hall of Fame and solo artistry ===
In 2019, Myrin performed "That's What Friends Are For" alongside Carole Bayer Sager, Patti LaBelle, Desmond Child and Jordan Smith at the Songwriters Hall of Fame 50th Annual Induction and Awards Dinner in New York City, in honour of Carole Bayer Sager receiving the Johnny Mercer Award.

That year, he co-wrote "Thank Me Later", "Lonely" and "Stranger" with Devon Gilfillian for his debut album Black Hole Rainbow, which the New York Times described as a "formidable debut". The album was nominated for a Grammy for Best Engineered Album, Non-Classical in 2021.

Also in 2019, Myrin co-wrote "Victorious" with Nicole Scherzinger, which was performed at the 2019 Special Olympics World Games in Abu Dhabi. Now United performed his co-written song "Beautiful Life" at the opening ceremony of the same games.

Céline Dion recorded "Play Me Like A Love Song", co-written by Myrin and Carole Bayer Sager, in June 2019. Later that year, Myrin co-wrote "At This Table" for Idina Menzel's holiday album Christmas: A Season of Love.

"Gloria the Gift of Life" was used as the end-title music for the film Fatima (2020). That same year, Myrin wrote "Together in This" for the animated film Jungle Beat: The Movie, performed by Natasha Bedingfield. Myrin and Bedingfield performed the song on Live with Kelly and Ryan and CBS's The Talk, among other programmes. Also in 2020, Myrin wrote the theme song "Just a Breath Away (Noel)" for the holiday film The Three Wise Men, directed by Yarrow Cheney and featuring narration from the late Andy Griffith.

During 2020, Myrin wrote "Sweet Freedom" for the Kelly Family's album 25 Years Later Live, which reached No. 1 in Germany, and wrote and produced four songs for Patricia Kelly's album One More Year, also performing a duet with her on "Don't Lose Hope".

Following encouragement from Barbra Streisand, Myrin released his US debut single "Not Alone" with Capitol Music Group in August 2020. Co-written with Crispin Hunt and co-produced by Elias Kapari, the song features string arrangements by Erik Arvinder conducting the Stockholm Symphony. The song is a re-recording of a track first released on Myrin's 2012 album Dreams Plans Everything.

He reunited with Idina Menzel in a duet version of "At This Table" for a deluxe edition of the album sold at Target stores at Christmas 2020, and the pair performed together at the USO Christmas Holiday special that year.

He co-wrote "No Fear" for Kari Jobe's album The Blessing: Live, which reached No. 1 on the Billboard Christian Albums chart upon its release in October 2020.

=== 2021–present: Grammy, Eurovision and global collaborations ===
In 2022, Myrin co-wrote "The Greatest Gift" with Andrea Bocelli, Amy Wadge and Stephan Moccio for the Bocelli family album A Family Christmas, performed by Andrea, Matteo and Virginia Bocelli.

In November 2024, Myrin co-wrote and produced "First Christmas" for actress Diane Keaton, alongside Carole Bayer Sager. The song, featuring string arrangements by Erik Arvinder, became Keaton's first solo single release. Following Keaton's death on 11 October 2025, it became her first and final solo recording. The song debuted at No. 22 on the Billboard Digital Song Sales chart.

In 2025, Myrin wrote songs for the Amazon Prime Video series House of David, including "Lead Me to the Water", written and produced by Myrin and performed by Michael Iskander and Gabby Barrett; "Beautiful Horizon", co-written with Eden Golan and Stav Beger; and "Help", co-written with Tasha Cobbs Leonard. Also in 2025, "Let It Be a Hallelujah" was released by Lauren Daigle. Co-written with Daigle and the late producer Busbee in 2019, the song had remained unreleased for six years. The song reached number one on the Billboard Christian Airplay chart in February 2026.Myrin composed original songs Adventure Song and the Young David songs 23 and Rhythm of Grace for the animated musical Angel Studios film David, which grossed over $82 million worldwide at the box office. The animated family adventure was added to Netflix on June 3, 2026, and was the No. 1 movie on in the United States by June 5, 2026.

On Friday, 7 November 2025 the 68th Annual Grammy Awards, Myrin received a nomination for the Grammy Award for Best Gospel Performance/Song as one of the co-writers of "Church", performed by Tasha Cobbs Leonard and John Legend.

In 2026, Myrin co-wrote "Eclipse" with Delta Goodrem, Ferras Alqaisi and Michael Fatkin, with Fatkin producing the track. The song was written during a session in Sydney in November 2025, following Goodrem's confirmation as Australia's Eurovision representative.

The song, released as a single on 1 March 2026, was selected to represent Australia at the 70th Eurovision Song Contest in Vienna. In the United Kingdom, the single debuted at number 34 on the UK Singles Downloads Chart on 6 March 2026. In Australia, "Eclipse" debuted at number one on the AIR Independent Singles Chart, holding the position for three consecutive weeks. At the Grand Final on 16 May 2026 in Vienna, the song finished in fourth place with 287 points.

Jonas co-wrote the single "Hologram" from Delta Goodrem's forthcoming album Pure with Delta, Ferras Alqaisi and Michael Fatkin (released on 26 June 2026). Production was handled by Fatkin.

== Awards ==
- Dove Award for Worship Song of the Year for "Our God" (Chris Tomlin) in 2011
- Two Dove Award nominations for "Our God" (Chris Tomlin) in 2011
- Billboard Music Award for Top Christian Song for "Our God" (Chris Tomlin) in 2011
- Grammy Award nomination for "Our God" (Chris Tomlin) at the 53rd Grammy Awards in 2011
- Grammy Award for Best Contemporary Christian Music Song for "10,000 Reasons (Bless the Lord)" (Matt Redman) at the 55th Annual Grammy Awards in 2013
- Grammy Award for Best Gospel/Contemporary Christian Music Performance for "10,000 Reasons (Bless the Lord)" (Matt Redman) at the 55th Annual Grammy Awards in 2013
- Billboard Music Award for Top Christian Song for "10,000 Reasons (Bless the Lord)" (Matt Redman) in 2013
- Dove Awards for Song of the Year Pop Contemporary, Praise and Worship Song, Songwriter of the Year, Contemporary Christian Performance for "10,000 Reasons (Bless the Lord)" (Matt Redman) in 2013
- Six Dove Award wins in total
- Dove Award for Contemporary Gospel/Urban Song of the Year for "Our God" (Chris Tomlin) in 2014
- Dove Award nomination for Contemporary Gospel/Urban Song of the Year for "Our God" (Chris Tomlin) in 2014
- Dove Award nomination for "Let It Be Jesus" in 2016
- Dove Award nomination for Urban Worship Recorded Song of the Year for "The Name of Our God" (Tasha Cobbs Leonard) in 2018
- Dove Award nomination for Worship Recorded Song of the Year for "Great Things" (Phil Wickham) in 2020
- Grammy Award nomination for Best Gospel Performance/Song for "Church" (Tasha Cobbs Leonard feat. John Legend) at the 68th Annual Grammy Awards in 2026
- GMA Dove Award for Traditional Gospel Recorded Song of the Year for the song Church in 2026 (Tasha Cobbs Leonard, John Legend Writers: Tasha Cobbs Leonard, Kenneth Leonard Jr, Brunes Charles, Jonas Myrin, ANTHNY, Annatoria Chitapa)

== Discography ==
Solo

- Dreams Plans Everything (2012)
- "Sadness" (2017)
- "Not Alone" (2020)
- "Not Alone (Stockholm Symphony Version)" (2020)
- "Just a Breath Away (Noel)" (2020)
- "Mountains" (2022)

Year	Song	Artist	Co-writers	Album
2003	"Centre of My Life", "Gonna Be Alright", "Father's Love", "I Will Go", "Me"	Hillsong Worship	Natasha Bedingfield, Gio Galanti	Shout Gods Fame
2003	"Shout Your Fame"	Hillsong Worship	Natasha Bedingfield, Gio Galanti, Paul Nevison	Hope
2004	"Hallelujah"	Marty Sampson	Marty Sampson	For All You've Done
2005	"There is Nothing Like"	Marty Sampson	Marty Sampson	Look to You and God He Reigns
2007	"Christmas Angels"	Michael W. Smith	Michael W. Smith	It's a Wonderful Christmas
2007	"Feelgood"	Ola	Tony Nilsson	Good Enough
2007	"Yours"	Steven Curtis Chapman	Steven Curtis Chapman	This Moment
2009	"2nd Chance"	Anna Abreu	Patrik Berggren, Karl Aastroem	Just a Pretty Face?
2009	"We Shall Not Be Shaken", "Through it All", "You Alone Can Rescue", "The Glory of Our King", "How Great is Your Faithfulness", "Gloria", "All That Really Matters"	Matt Redman	Matt Redman, Jess Cates, Peter Kvint	We Shall Not Be Shaken
2010	"Another Sky"	Harry Brooks Jr.	Mathias Wollo, Melissa Pierce	5 April
2010	"Sígueme Y Te Seguiré"	Christian Chávez	Peter Kvint	Almas Transparentes
2010	"Our God"	Chris Tomlin	Matt Redman, Jesse Reeves, Chris Tomlin	And If Our God Is For Us
2010	"A Little Too Much", "Run Run Run", "Break Thru"	Natasha Bedingfield	Natasha Bedingfield, John Hill, Andreas Kleerup	Strip Me
2011	"Nuestro Dios (Our God)"	Eric Lopez	Chris Tomlin, Jesse Reeves, Matt Redman	Top 25 Cantos de Alabanza (2012 Edition)
2011	"Never Once", "We Are the Free", "Holy", "10,000 Reasons (Bless the Lord)", "Fires", "Where Would We Be", "We Could Change the World", "Magnificent", "O This God", "Endless Hallelujah"	Matt Redman	Matt Redman, Jason Ingram, Chris Tomlin, Tim Wanstall	10,000 Reasons
2012	"Cornerstone"	Hillsong Live	Eric Liljero, Reuben Morgan, Edward Mote	Cornerstone
2012	"Nosso Deus (Our God)"	Marcus Salles	Chris Tomlin, Jesse Reeves, Matt Redman	Ao vivo na Igreja
2012	"Yahweh"	Passion	Jason Ingram, Chris Tomlin	Passion: White Flag
2013	"One and Only One"	Tohoshinki	Peter Kvint	TIME
2013	"Christ Is Enough"	Hillsong Church	Reuben Morgan	Glorious Ruins
2013	"Benediction", "I Need You Now", "Mercy", "One Name Alone", "This Beating Heart", "Wide As the Sky", "Your Grace Finds Me"	Matt Redman	Matt Redman, Scott Ligertwood, Jason Ingram, Kristian Stanfill	Your Grace Finds Me
2013	"Dieu admirable"	Georges Merza	Chris Tomlin, Jesse Reeves, Matt Redman	Culture Louange
2013	"Let My People Go"	Matt Redman	Beth Redman, Gary Baker, Matt Redman	Secret World
2013	"Mis Ojos Están en Ti"	Martin Smith	Martin Smith	Día de Redención
2013	"Santo (Holy)"	Mariana Valadão	Jason Ingram, Matt Redman	Santo
2013	"Sovereign"	Chris Tomlin	Jason Ingram, Chris Tomlin, Martin Chalk, Matt Redman	Burning Lights
2014	"Broken Vessels (Amazing Grace)", "No Other Name", "Calvary", "Our Father"	Hillsong Worship	Joel Houston, Taya Smith, Reuben Morgan, Mrs. Walter G. Taylor, Scott Ligertwood, Brooke Fraser	No Other Name
2014	"At the Cross (Love Ran Red)", "Jesus, This is You"	Chris Tomlin	Chris Tomlin, Ed Cash, Matt Armstrong, Matt Redman	Love Ran Red
2014	"Half a Heart"	I Heart Sharks	Joseph Cross, Pierre Beecroft, Simon Wangemann	Anthems
2014	"Let It Be Jesus"	Passion, Christy Nockels	Chris Tomlin, Matt Redman	Let It Be Jesus
2014	"Vases d'Argile (Grâce Infinie)"	Hillsong En Français	Joel Houston	Simplified Worship Songs in French
2014	"Worthy"	Passion	Chris Tomlin, Matt Redman	Passion: Take it All
2014	"Zehntausend Gründe"	Yasmina Hunzinger, Daniel Harter, Ann Kristin Röder	David Hanheiser, David Schnitter, Matt Redman	Night of the Hymns
2015	"Hello"	Kiyohito Komatsu, Patrik Berggren, David Astrom	w-inds	Seventh Ave.
2015	"A Christmas Alleluia", "A King Like This", "Midnight Clear (Love Song)"	Chris Tomlin	Chris Tomlin, Matt Redman, Ed Cash/Traditional	Adore: Christmas Songs of Worship
2015	"Be With You", "Remedy"	Leslie Clio	Leslie Clio, Per Ekland	
2015	"Find Me at the Feet of Jesus", "Let It Be Jesus"	Christy Nockels	Chris Tomlin, Matt Redman	Let It Be Jesus
2015	"Flames", "King of My Soul", "Louder", "Majesty of the Most High", "No One Like Our God", "Songs in the Night", "Unbroken Praise"	Matt Redman	Matt Redman, Jason Ingram, Jorge Mhondera, Willie Weeks, Chris Tomlin, Ed Cash	Unbroken Praise
2015	"King of My Soul"	Matt Redman	Matt Redman, Jorge Mhondera, Willie Weeks	Unbroken Promise
2015	"Let It Be Jesus"	Encounter Music	Chris Tomlin, Matt Redman	Who You Are
2015	"Me Rindo a Ti"	Aline Barros	Chris Tomlin, Jason Ingram, Matt Redman	Vivo Estas
2015	"Mi Roca", "Mi Todo", "Vasijas Rotas (Sublime Gracia)"	Hillsong en Español	Eric Liljero, Reuben Morgan, Joel Houston	En Esto Creo (live)
2015	"Santo (TCE)"	The Crossing Church	Matt Redman, Jason Ingram	The Crossing Sessions, Vol. 1
2016	"Let There Be Light"	Hillsong Worship	Michael Guy Chislett, Matt Crocker, Joel Houston, Brooke Fraser, Scott Ligertwood	Let There Be Light
2016	"Loyal"	Lauren Daigle	Jason Ingram, Lauren Daigle, Paul Mabury	How Can It Be
2016	"1000 Tongues"	Vertical Worship	Andi Rozier, Chris Tomlin, Jason Ingram, Matt Maher, Matt Redman	Frontiers
2016	"A Minha Fé (My Faith)"	Ministério de Louvor Rio do Trono		Incomparável
2016	"Crie ta gloire"	Jeunesse en Mission	Gio Galanti, Natasha Nevison, Paul Nevison	J'aime l'Eternel Kids Vol. 5
2016	"Find Me"	Sylver Logan Sharp	Emanuel Olsson, Rachel Thibodeau	Find Me
2016	"Glory Hallelujah", "Glory to You in the Highest", "Hearts Waiting (Joy to the World)", "Help From Heaven", "O Little Town (The Glory of Christmas)", "The Name of Emmanuel"	Matt Redman	Matt Redman, Beth Redman, Chris Tomlin, Bernie Herms/Traditional	These Christmas Lights
2016	"God and God Alone", "God of Calvary"	Chris Tomlin	Jason Ingram, Chris Tomlin, Matt Maher, Matt Redman	Never Lose Sight
2016	"Lay Me Down"	The Hope Collective	Chris Tomlin, Jason Ingram, Matt Redman	Back to Life
2016	"Mercy"	Bethany Worship	Matt Redman	The Spark
2016	"Mín Vón Er Bygd Á" (featuring Bodil Olsen)	Maibritt Højgaard Johansen, Keldan Worship	Eric Liljero, Reuben Morgan, Edward Mote, Maibritt Højgaard Johansen	Mín Vón Er Bygd Á
2016	"No Hay Otro Nombre"	Twice	Joel Houston	Sesión Orgánica, Vol. 3
2016	"Sovereign"	Melinda Botticelli	Jason Ingram, Chris Tomlin, Martin Chalk, Matt Redman	Melinda Botticelli live
2016	"Vasijas Rotas"	Marisol Park	Joel Houston	Mi Todo
2017	"Weil Liebe nie zerbricht"	Helene Fischer	Robin Grubert, Justin Stanley, Ali Zuckowski, Sera Finale, Jennie Lena	Helene Fischer
2017	"Awake My Soul (A 1000 Tongues)"	Laura Story	Laura Story, Matt Maher, Matt Redman	Open Hands
2017	"En Tu Cruz"	La Octava	Chris Tomlin, Ed Cash, Matt Armstrong, Matt Redman	Eterna Roca
2017	"Glory Be"	Connection Worship	Chris Tomlin, Ed Cash, Jason Ingram	Come Alive
2017	"Gracefully Broken", "The Name of Our God", "The River of the Lord", "Wonderful Grace", "Your Spirit"	Tasha Cobbs Leonard	Bryan Torwalt, Katie Torwalt, Matt Redman, Tasha Cobbs Leonard, Kenneth Leonard Jr., Kim Walker-Smith	Heart.Passion.Pursuit
2017	"Greatest Hallelujah"	Matt Redman	Matt Redman	Glory Song
2017	"Here I Bow", "Mention of Your Name", "Mercy and Majesty"	Dan Musselman		After All These Years: Solo Piano
2017	"Home"	Grainne Duffy	Justin Stanley	Where I Belong
2017	"Hope is Marching On", "It is Finished", "Questions (You Are Faithful)", "Still I Sing"	Matt Redman	Matt Redman, Ed Cash	Glory Song
2017	"Love Looks Like"	Art House	Natasha Bedingfield, Julio Reyes Copello	Love Looks Like (with Natasha Bedingfield)
2017	"Misfit Anthem (Radio Version)"	Social Club Misfits	Fernando Miranda, Joel Houston, Joel McNeill, John McNeill, Marty Santiago, Wit Shahbazian	The Misadventures of Fern & Marty
2018	"Heart of God", "SELAH I"	Hillsong Young & Free	Aodhán King	III
2018	"Gloria the Gift of Life"	Andrea Bocelli	Bob Ezrin, Edmond Cash	Si
2018	"What's on My Mind", "Don't Lie to Me", "The Rain Will Fall", "Better Angels"	Barbra Streisand	Barbra Streisand, Carole Bayer Sager, Jay Landers, John Shanks, Charlie Midnight	Walls
2018	"Tu me manques" (featuring Vanessa Paradis), "Hope", "Je veux bien, je ne sais pas", "Le jour et la nuit", "La question", "Ne tombe pas"	Gaëtan Roussel	Gaëtan Roussel, Dimitri Peronno, Justin Stanley, Clarisse Fieurgant	Traffic
2018	"Great Things"	Phil Wickham	Phil Wickham	Living Hope
2018	"10K"	KB	Kevin Burgess, Matt Redman, Quinten Coblentz, Wes Writer	45
2018	"Cuando Menciono Tu Nombre"	Victor Robles	Brian Johnson, Jenn Johnson, Matt Redman, Seth Mosley	Cuando Menciono Tu Nombre
2018	"Deeper"	Tamia	Julio Reyes, Lundon "DaBridge" Knighten, Tamia Hill	Passion Like Fire
2018	"Isus Imi E-Ndeajuns"	Decean	Reuben Morgan	Un Drum Nou EP
2018	"Não Há Um Nome Igual", "Vasos Quebrados (Sublime Graça)"	Hillsong Em Português	Joel Houston	Quão Lindo Esse Nome
2018	"Tu Corazón"	Twice	Aodhán King	Tu Corazón
2018	"Zehntausend Gründe"	Jugendchor Mitternachtsruf	David Hanheiser, David Schnitter, Matt Redman	König Jesus
2019	"Beautiful Life"	Now United	Gannin Arnold, Lousteau John	Now United Essentials
2019	"Dias Roubados"	Ana Carolina	Ana Carolina, Antonio Villeroy	Fogueira em Alto Mar EP
2019	"At This Table"	Idina Menzel	Idina Menzel	Christmas: A Season of Love
2019	"Sweet Freedom"	The Kelly Family	Patricia Kelly	25 Years Later
2019	"Hoje Eu Sei"	Vanessa da Mata	Vanessa da Mata	Quando Deixamos Nossos Beijos na Esquina
2019	"A Tu Nombre Mencionar – Sesiones Emerge"	Antonio & Allison	Brian Johnson, Jenn Johnson, Seth Mosley	A Tu Nombre Mencionar – Sesiones Emerge
2019	"Alive"	Hillsong Worship	Gio Galanti, Natasha Bedingfield	Jesus is My Superhero
2019	"Always Jesus"	Gene Moore	Bernie Herms, Danny Gokey, Matt Redman	Tunnel Vision
2019	"Bénis Dieu"	Andy Alonso	Matt Redman	Dieu incomparable
2019	"Love Never Fails"	William Murphy	Tasha Cobbs Leonard	Settle Here
2019	"Mi Dios"	Sara Escobar	Chris Tomlin, Jesse Reeves, Matt Redman	Sesiones Acústicas, Vol. 3
2019	"Pai Nosso"	Cristiane Luiza	Brooke Ligertwood, Scott Ligertwood	Eterno
2019	"Quem Sabe Numa Tarde"	Ana Carolina	Ana Carolina, Antonio Villeroy	Quem Sabe Numa Tarde
2019	"Worship Medley"	Donnie McClurkin	Chris Tomlin, Darius Paulk, Ed Cash, Jesse Reeves, Matt Redman, Robin Mark	A Different Song
2020	"Thank Me Later", "Stranger", "Lonely"	Devon Gilfillian	Devon Gilfillian, Thad Cockrell, Tim Bruns, Jeremy Lutito, Tobias Jesso Jr., Carl Anderson, Zack Smith, Hedy West, Ted Daryll, Jonathan Smalt, Tim Anderson	Black Hole Rainbow
2020	"Together in This"	Natasha Bedingfield	Natasha Bedingfield	Jungle Beat: The Movie soundtrack
2020	"Don't Lose Hope", "Love Found Me", "Mother", "We're Gonna Be Okay"	Patricia Kelly	Patricia Kelly	One More Year
2020	"Hati-Mu"	Hillsong Dalam Bahasa Indonesia	Aodhán King	Raja S'gala Raja
2020	"Hij Is Genoeg Voor Mij"	Squareband	Reuben Morgan	Square Live 2019
2020	"Le cœur de Dieu"	Hillsong En Français	Aodhán King	Mains nettes / Cœurs purs
2020	"Love We're Going to Lose"	Craig Strickland	Craig Strickland	Starlit Afternoon
2020	"The Lord is My Salvation"	Shane & Shane	Keith Getty, Kristyn Getty, Nathan Nockels	Facing a Task Unfinished
2020	"There's Nobody Like You" / "Our God is Greater"	IMMV Band	Chris Tomlin, Jesse Reeves, Matt Redman	X
2022	"The Greatest Gift"	Andrea Bocelli, Matteo Bocelli, Virginia Bocelli	Amy Wadge, Stephan Moccio, Andrea Bocelli	A Family Christmas
2025	"Lead Me to the Water"	Michael Iskander & Gabby Barrett		House of David (Music Inspired by the Prime Video Original Series, Season One)
2025	"Beautiful Horizon"	Eden Golan	Eden Golan, Stav Beger	House of David (Music Inspired by the Prime Video Original Series, Season One)
2025	"Help"	Tasha Cobbs Leonard	Tasha Cobbs Leonard	House of David (Music Inspired by the Prime Video Original Series, Season One)
2025	"Let It Be a Hallelujah"	Lauren Daigle	Busbee, Lauren Daigle	Single
2026	"Eclipse"	Delta Goodrem	Ferras Alqaisi, Michael Fatkin	Pure
