= Matt Redman =

English worship leader and musician (born 1974)

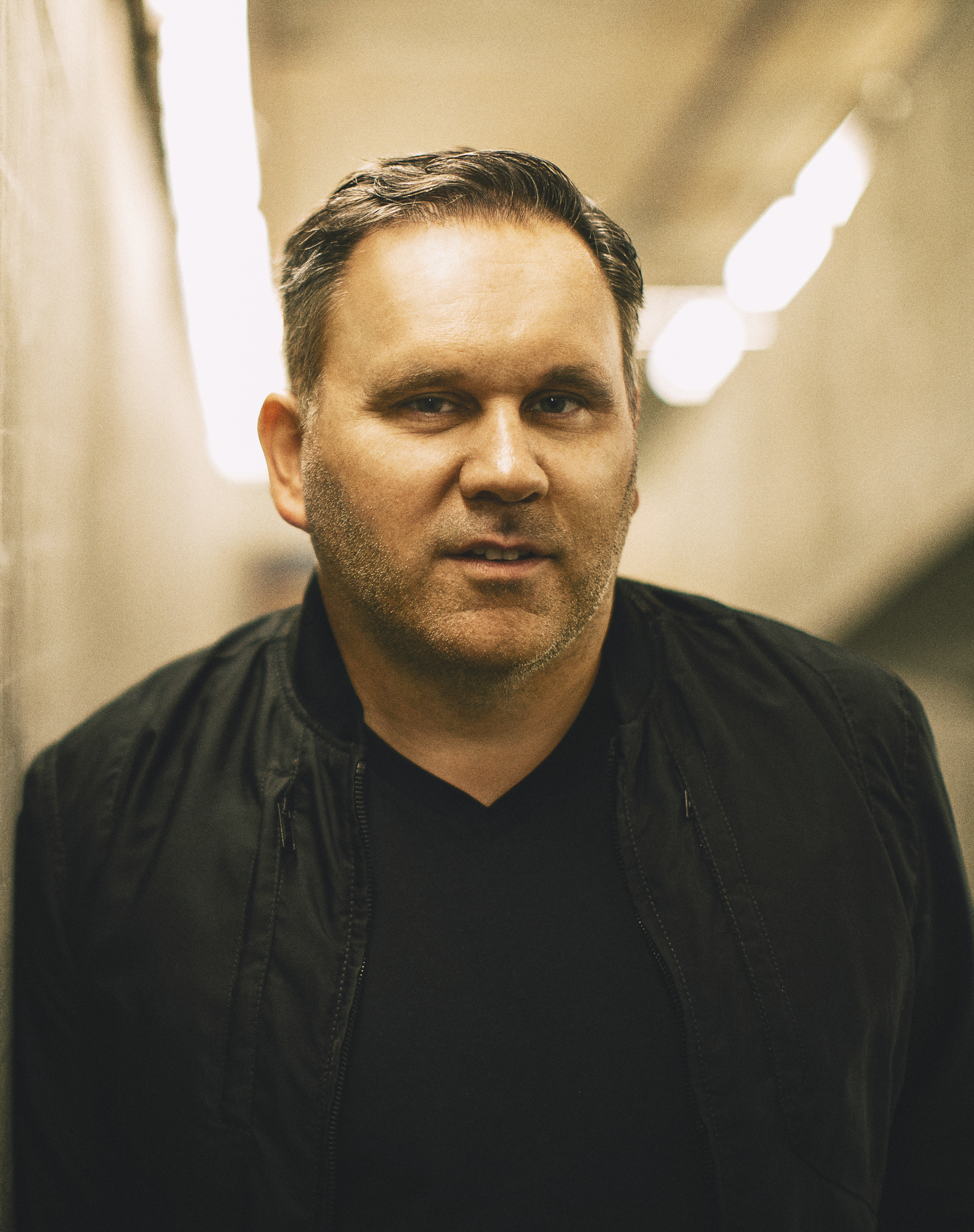
- Redman in 2019

Background information
- Born: Matthew James Redman; 14 February 1974 (age 52); Watford, England
- Genres: Worship, contemporary Christian, pop
- Occupations: Singer-songwriter, worship leader, author
- Instruments: Vocals, guitar
- Years active: 1993–present
- Labels: sixstepsrecords, Sparrow, Integrity
- Website: mattredman.com

Matthew James Redman (born 14 February 1974) is an English Christian worship leader, singer-songwriter and author. Redman has released 16 albums, written 8 books, and helped start three church-plants. He is best known for his two-time Grammy Award-winning single, "10,000 Reasons (Bless the Lord)". Co-written with Jonas Myrin, the single reached No. 1 on the US Billboard Christian Songs chart in 2012.

== Early life ==
Redman was born on 14 February 1974, and raised in Watford, England. The family had moved to Chorleywood, a small commuter town, when he was around the age of two. His father took his own life when Matt was seven years old, and he and his brother were raised predominantly by his mother. His mother later remarried into an abusive relationship that took a great toll on the family. At the age of 10, he converted to Christianity after attending a mission service by Luis Palau at London's QPR football stadium and was encouraged by Mike Pilavachi, an Anglican church youth leader to lead worship in his teens.

== Career ==
=== Christian church leadership ===
Redman converted to Christianity at the age of 10 and attended the Anglican church of St Andrew's Chorleywood, in Hertfordshire. It was there he learned to play guitar, and at the age of 20, he began leading worship services and released his first album. In 1993, Redman helped found alongside his youth leader, Mike Pilavachi, Soul Survivor, a global Christian movement and yearly music festival aimed at youth. From 1994 until 2002, Redman led worship services for Soul Survivor Church, Watford.

In 2002, after a sabbatical in America to record Where Angels Fear to Tread, Redman moved to Brighton. In 2004 he and his wife joined a new church plant, The Point, in West Sussex, led by pastor Will Kemp.

In 2008, Redman, along with his wife Beth and their three children, moved to Atlanta, Georgia, to help plant Passion City Church with Louie Giglio and Chris Tomlin. In August 2010, they returned to the UK with their children.

=== Music ===
Matt recorded his first album, Wake Up My Soul, at ICC studios in January and February 1994. The album had an impressive line-up of Christian musicians including Iona's Mike Haughton, percussionist Martin Neil, Split Level's Adrian Thompson, Helen Burgess and Les Moir on bass, and was produced by Martin Smith.

In 2002, Redman co-wrote with his wife Beth, the 2002 Dove Award-winning "Blessed Be Your Name" (Worship Song of the Year) and the Grammy Award-nominated "Our God." Since then, Matt and Beth have co-created some of Redman's most successful songs including, "You Never Let Go", "Face Down" and "Let My Words Be Few".

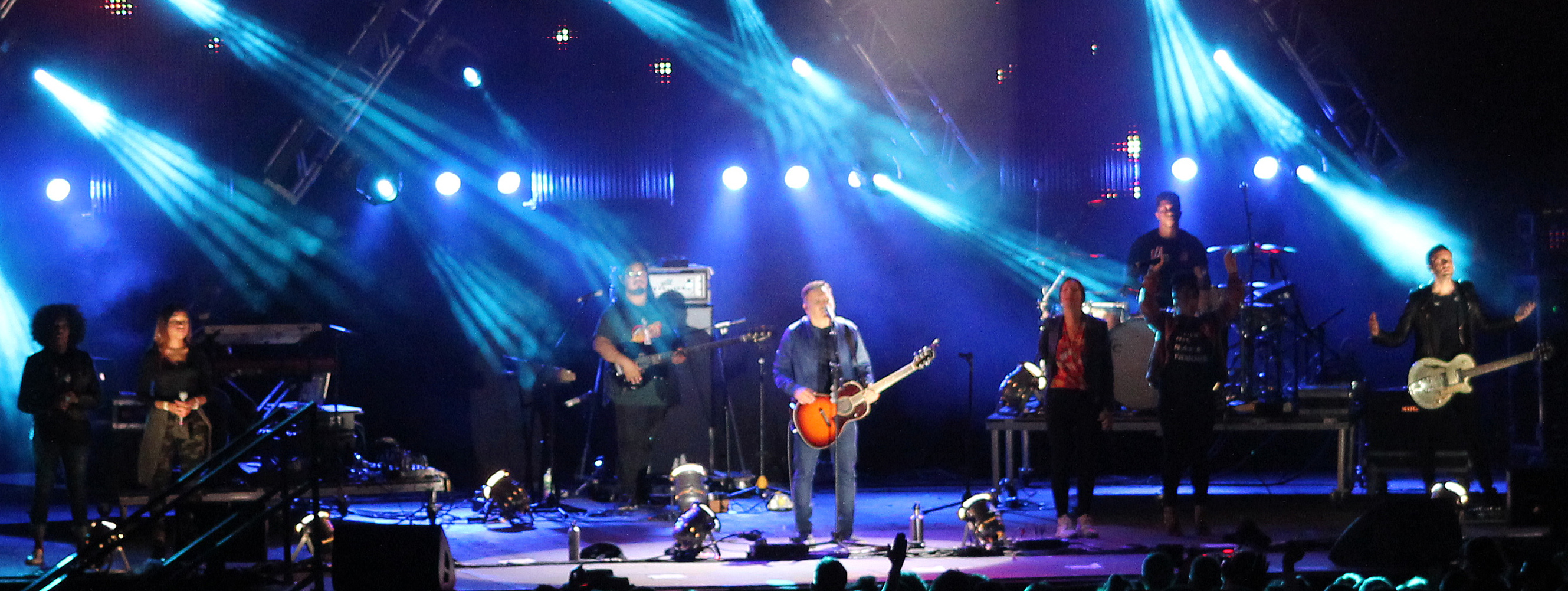
Redman performing in May 2018

In February 2011, Redman joined Chris Tomlin, Louie Giglio, and Nathan and Christy Nockels at LIFT – A Worship Leader Collective where his 2011 live album, 10,000 Reasons, was recorded. On 28 July 2012, "10,000 Reasons (Bless the Lord)", the title track of Redman's new album, topped the Billboard Christian Songs chart, where it stayed for 13 weeks. It was his first No. 1 hit on American Contemporary Christian radio. The single went on to win two Grammy Awards, for Best Contemporary Christian Music Song and Best Gospel/Contemporary Christian Music Performance and was certified Gold by RIAA in 2018. Matt has also won thirteen Gospel Music Association's Dove Awards.

The album's success came immediately after Matt Redman and LZ7, a Manchester-based Christian rap and urban music group, released the song "Twenty Seven Million" on 27 February 2012, to raise awareness for the anti-human trafficking movement. The record, charted on the UK Singles Chart reaching No. 12. Redman toured internationally with the band, to raise awareness for the cause through worship.

Redman's songs have been covered by a number of contemporary Christian music (CCM) artists including Matt Maher, Michael W. Smith, Jeremy Camp, Rebecca St. James, Chris Tomlin, David Crowder Band, Tree63, Kutless, Stellar Kart, and Hillsong United. He has regularly collaborates with other Christian musicians including Chris Tomlin and Tim Hughes.

In 2019, Redman announced he had signed with Integrity Music, with new music coming in late 2019, and a new album in 2020.

=== Writing ===
He has authored and edited multiple books on Christian worship, including The Unquenchable Worshipper and the book Facedown which accompanied the album of the same name. He and his wife co-wrote the book titled "Blessed Be Your Name" with the hopes to bring others to trust God and his goodness, no matter the circumstance.

== Personal life ==
He married Beth Redman, who is also a songwriter and author. The couple have five children.

On 13 July 2023, following reports of allegations of abuse committed by Mike Pilavachi, Redman released a statement in which he identified himself as one of Pilavachi's alleged victims. In his statement, Redman said, "I have spent years trying to fully heal from my time at Soul Survivor". In April 2024 he released a short documentary entitled Let There Be Light in which he described his experience.

== Discography ==
=== Albums ===
==== Studio albums ====
Year	Title	Peak chart position			Certifications
Year	Title	UK	US	US Christ.	Certifications
1993	Wake Up My Soul	—	—	—	
1995	Passion for Your Name	—	—	—	
1997	The Friendship and the Fear	—	—	—	
1998	Intimacy	—	—	—	
1999	The Heart of Worship (US release of Intimacy)	—	—	—	
2000	The Father's Song	—	—	—	
2002	Where Angels Fear to Tread	—	—	38	
2006	Beautiful News: Label: sixstepsrecords	—	156	8	
2009	We Shall Not Be Shaken: Label: sixstepsrecords	—	136	13	
2011	10,000 Reasons: Label: Sparrow Records	149	60	1	RIAA: Gold
2015	Unbroken Praise: At Abbey Road Studios: Label: sixstepsrecords	58	50	1	
2016	These Christmas Lights: Label: sixstepsrecords	—	—	15	
2017	Glory Song: Label: Sparrow/sixstepsrecords	—	112	2	
2020	Let There Be Wonder (Acoustic): Label: Integrity Music	—	—	—	
2023	Lamb of God: Label: Integrity Music	—	—	—	
2025	Life & Breath: Label: Integrity Music	—	—	—	

==== Live albums ====
Year	Title	Peak chart position		
Year	Title	UK	US	US Christ.
2004	Facedown: Label: sixstepsrecords	—	—	19
2005	Blessed Be Your Name: The Songs of Matt Redman Vol. 1: Label: sixstepsrecords	—	—	41
2013	Your Grace Finds Me: Label: sixstepsrecords	68	28	1
2020	Let There Be Wonder: Label: Integrity Music; Released: January 31, 2020	—	— (Note: Let There Be Wonder did not enter the Billboard 200, but peaked at No. 49 on the Top Album Sales chart.)	10

==== Compilation albums ====
Year	Title	Peak chart position		
Year	Title	UK	US	US Christian
2010	Ultimate Collection: Label: Sparrow	—	—	—
2012	Sing Like Never Before: The Essential Collection: Label: Sparrow	—	—	23

==== Video albums and DVDs ====
- 2004: Facedown (DVD)

=== Singles ===
Year	Song	Peak chart positions				Certifications	Album
Year	Song	US Bub.	US Christ	US Christ Airplay	UK	Certifications	Album
2003	"Blessed Be Your Name"	—	— (Note: "Blessed Be Your Name" did not enter the Hot Christian Songs chart, but peaked at No. 15 on the Christian Digital Song Sales chart.)	—	—		Where Angels Fear to Tread
2006	"You Never Let Go"	—	17		—	RIAA: Gold	Beautiful News
2011	"10,000 Reasons (Bless the Lord)"	3	1		—	RIAA: 2× Platinum; BPI: Silver; RMNZ: Platinum	10,000 Reasons
2011	"Never Once"	—	—	— (Note: "Never Once" did not enter the Christian Airplay chart, but peaked at No. 16 on the Christian Soft AC chart.)	—		10,000 Reasons
2012	"Twenty Seven Million" (with LZ7)	—	45		12		non-album single
2013	"Your Grace Finds Me"	—	11	10	—		Your Grace Finds Me
2014	"Mercy"	—	37	28	—		Your Grace Finds Me
2015	"It Is Well With My Soul"	—	34	24	—		Unbroken Praise
2015	"Unbroken Praise"	—	—	— (Note: "Unbroken Praise" did not enter the Christian Airplay chart, but peaked at No. 1 on the Christian Soft AC chart.)	—		Unbroken Praise
2016	"His Name Shall Be"	—	35	21	—		These Christmas Lights
2016	"Help from Heaven" (with Natasha Bedingfield)	—	—	33	—		These Christmas Lights
2017	"Gracefully Broken" (with Tasha Cobbs Leonard)	—	18	17	—		Glory Song
2019	"One Day (When We All Get to Heaven)"	—	—	—	—		Glory Song
2019	"The Same Jesus"	—	46	34	—		Let There Be Wonder (Live)
2020	"We Praise You" (with Brandon Lake)	—	—	—	—		Let There Be Wonder (Live)
2020	"Upon Him"	—	—	—	—		Let There Be Wonder (Live)

== Appearances ==
Collaborations on Passion event albums

- 2000: "Did You Feel The Mountains Tremble?" on The Road to OneDay
- 2003: "O Come Let Us Adore Him" / "Come Let Us Return to the Lord" and "Blessed Be Your Name" on Sacred Revolution: Songs From OneDay 03
- 2004: "Father Let Me Dedicate" / "Here Is Love" on Passion: Hymns Ancient and Modern
- 2006: "You Never Let Go" on Everything Glorious
- 2008: "God of Our Yesterdays" / "Shine" / "Dancing Generation" on God of This City
- 2010: "You Alone Can Rescue" on Passion: Awakening
- 2011: "Set Free" (jointly with Chris Tomlin) on Passion: Here for You
- 2012: "Lay Me Down" (jointly with Chris Tomlin) / "10,000 Reasons (Bless the Lord)" on Passion: White Flag
- 2013: "Jesus, Only Jesus" / "Shout" (jointly with Chris Tomlin) on Passion: Let the Future Begin
- 2014: "Mercy" / "Worthy" on Passion: Take It All

Appearances on Passion Live and Passion compilation albums

- 2000: OneDay: Live
- 2005: How Great Is Our God
- 2006: The Best of Passion (So Far)
- 2007: Live from Passion 07 Pt. 2

== Awards ==
Grammy Award wins

- 2013: Best Contemporary Christian Music Song – "10,000 Reasons (Bless the Lord)"
- 2013: Best Gospel/Contemporary Christian Music Performance – "10,000 Reasons (Bless the Lord)"

Dove Award wins

- 2005: Worship Song of the Year: "Blessed Be Your Name"
- 2006: Praise and Worship Album of the Year: Blessed Be Your Name: The Songs of Matt Redman Vol. 1
- 2007: Children's Music Album of the Year: VeggieTales Worship Songs
- 2007: Special Event Album of the Year: Passion: Everything Glorious
- 2009: Special Event Album of the Year: Passion: God of This City
- 2011: Worship Song of the Year – TIE: "Our God"
- 2011: Special Event Album of the Year: Passion: Awakening
- 2013: Song of the Year: "10,000 Reasons (Bless the Lord)"
- 2013: Contemporary Christian Performance of the Year: "10,000 Reasons (Bless the Lord)"
- 2013: Songwriter of the Year

Church of England

- 2016: Cranmer Award for Worship, "for his contribution to the worship life of the Church"

== Published books ==
- The Unquenchable Worshipper (2001)
- Where Angels Fear to Tread (2002)
- The Heart of Worship Files (2003)
- Facedown (2004)
- Inside Out Worship (2005)
- Blessed Be Your Name (with Beth Redman) (2005)
- Mirror Ball (2011)
- 10,000 Reasons: Stories of Faith, Hope, and Thankfulness Inspired by the Worship Anthem (with Craig Borlase) (2017)
