= Lou Fellingham =

English worship leader and singer-songwriter (born 1974)

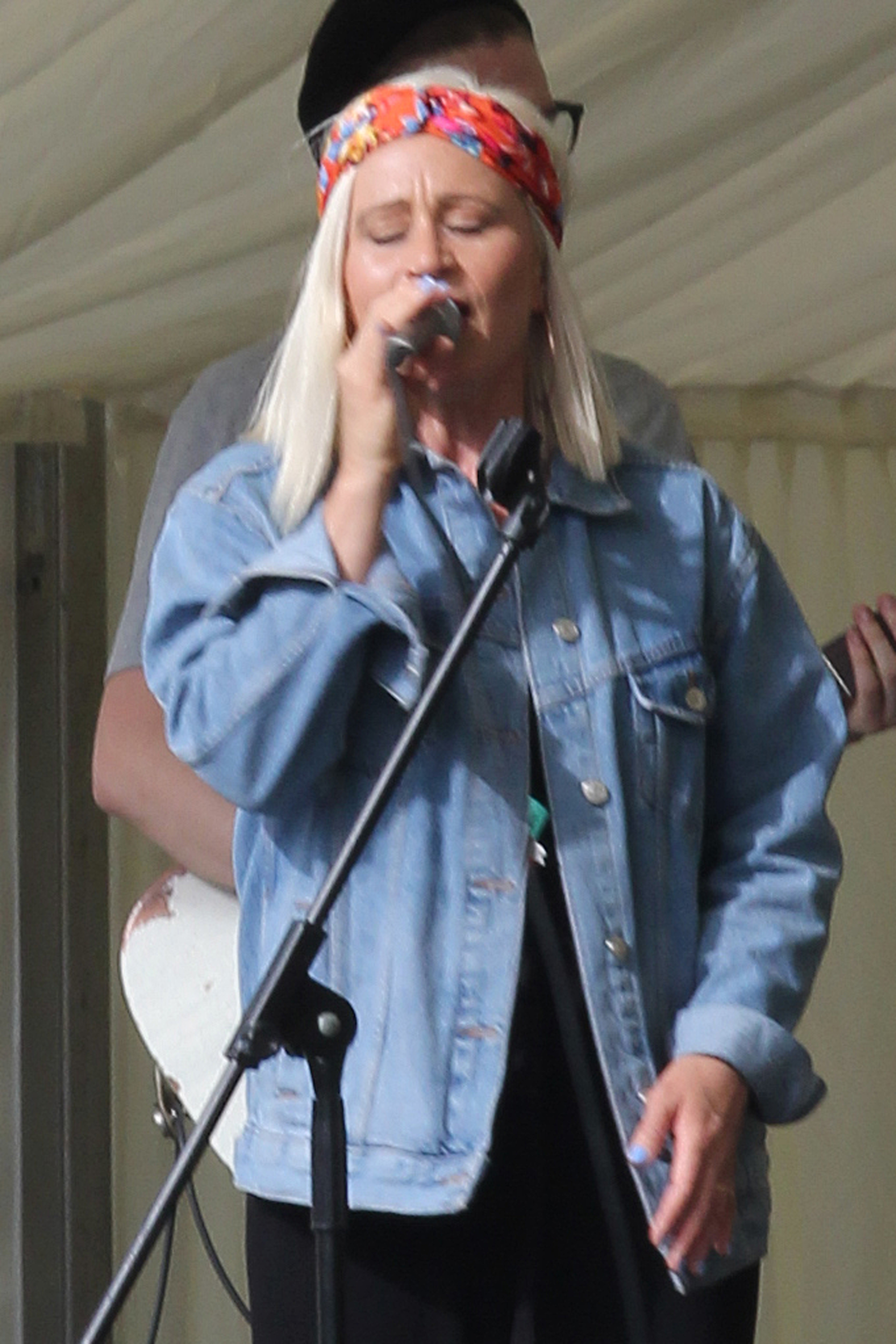
- Fellingham performing at the Big Church Day Out Festival at Wiston, West Sussex in 2017

Background information
- Born: Louise Hunt; 5 May 1974 (age 52)
- Origin: Brighton, England
- Genres: Worship, contemporary Christian music
- Occupations: Worship leader, singer, songwriter
- Years active: 1994–present
- Labels: Kingsway, Integrity Music
- Website: Official website

Louise "Lou" Fellingham (née Hunt; born 5 May 1974) is an English Christian worship leader, singer and songwriter from Brighton in East Sussex, England. She is a founding member of the British band Phatfish and has also pursued a solo career. In 2008, she won a Christian Broadcasting Council (CBC) Award for her album Promised Land, in the category of Best Worship. She has worked alongside other Christian artists such as Matt Redman, Graham Kendrick, Tim Hughes and Stuart Townend. She regularly leads worship and performs at different venues around the world. A rendition of Fellingham leading the hymn "In Christ Alone" has had more than six million views on YouTube.

== Personal background ==
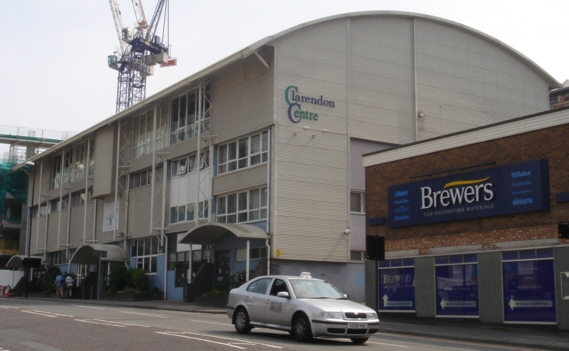
Church of Christ the King in Clarendon Centre at Brighton

Louise (Lou) Fellingham (née Hunt) grew up in the West Sussex village of Turners Hill in England, where she attended the Turners Hill Free Church. In her teens, during the late 1980s and early 1990s, she sang in two local Christian groups, The Turners Hill Mob and 4th Dimension. Both gained local acclaim among the churches and youth groups of mid Sussex. In 1998, she married Nathan Fellingham, the drummer and one of the founding members of Phatfish. Together, they have three children.

The family attends the Church of Christ the King (CCK), where they are frequently involved in leading worship and musical projects. In particular, Fellingham serves the church by training and managing their 50-member church choir. Nathan's father, David Fellingham has served as one of the elders since 1979. The church is also home to Stuart Townend, Paul Oakley and other prominent Christian figures. The evangelical church is affiliated with the Newfrontiers neocharismatic church network and is located at the Clarendon Centre near Brighton railway station.

== Professional background ==
Fellingham has been the lead singer of the British Christian band Phatfish for the last 17 years, which has played in worship conferences, concert halls, and music festivals, touring throughout Europe and around the world. She has also performed as a soloist and worship leader and has toured extensively throughout the UK, Canada and the United States.

The various music festivals and worship conferences in which she has participated include the following:

- Stoneleigh Bible Week
- Church of Christ the King
- Newfrontiers
- Mission:Worship Conference
- Greenbelt Festival
- Festival:Manchester
- Newday Youth Festival
- Soul Survivor
- Keswick Convention
- New Wine Christian Festival
- New Word Alive
- Spring Harvest Christian Conference
- Souled Out (Aberdeen)
- Bognor Regis Bible Week
- Christ for the Nations UK
- Worship Together
- Hope HIV
- Soul by the Sea
- Newfrontiers Leadership Conference
- Newday Youth Festival
- Woman to Woman Northern Conference
- Together On A Mission Conference
- The Cheltenham Bible Festival
- Worship at the Abbey
- Kingsway Children's Conference
- Radiant Conference
- Big Church Day Out Festival
- Pentecost Festival
- Cheltenham Bible Conference
- Women Walking With God
- Soul Sista
- Together at Westpoint 2011

=== Phatfish and Lou Fellingham ===
In late 2005, Lou Fellingham began recording her debut solo album Treasure, which was released in January 2006. Fellingham wrote most of the songs on the album, while her husband served as co-writer. The album quickly shot to the number one spot, becoming the best-selling album of 2006 through Cross Rhythms.

In 2006 and early 2007, before work on the next Phatfish studio album started, Fellingham began performing songs from Treasure on a "Stu and Lou" Tour, with Stuart Townend, which took them to various locations around the UK. When Phatfish's Guaranteed was released in July 2007, it received positive reviews and high sales at Christian events. With the success of both Fellingham's Treasure, and Phatfish's Guaranteed, rather than embark on an official Guaranteed tour, Phatfish followed up with a series of one-night shows and a TV appearance on Premier TV, under the banner Phatfish and Lou Fellingham.

In early 2008, the band performed two more Phatfish and Lou Fellingham concerts in connection with Hope 08. The first event was in Brighton, as part of "Soul By The Sea"; the second in Gloucester on 14 March. Lou Fellingham led worship at the Kingsway's Children's Ministry conference in January, and the band gigged and led worship at New Word Alive in Wales alongside Stuart Townend. There were five more concerts in 2008; Keswick, Crawley, NEWI, Danbury and Bognor Regis Bible Week.

Since 1994, live appearances by Phatfish had simply been titled Phatfish, but due to the successful release of Lou Fellingham's debut album, along with the appearance of some of her songs in the setlist, her name was incorporated into the title as Phatfish and Lou Fellingham. Fellingham's husband, Nathan described the arrangement during an interview with Adrian Warnock.

So, we’re out sometimes as Phatfish, sometimes as Lou Fellingham, Lou Fellingham Band, whatever. Sometimes it’s Stuart Townend’s Worship Band—you know. All these different things—it’s all us. It’s all the same heart, just slightly different expressions of different songs.

—Nathan Fellingham

More recently, concerts have been titled Phatfish and Lou Fellingham, with songs from Lou Fellingham's set of works and Phatfish's works being played, in addition to older songs, as well. Phatfish and Lou Fellingham have also supported Stuart Townend in Cheltenham and Wrexham, with less dynamic lighting and a more acoustic sound.

In addition to other musical projects, Fellingham continues to lead worship and head up the choir at her local church. She is still a faithful member of the band Phatfish and they have just released their latest full studio album, In Jesus. Recent appearances at Newday, Souled Out, The Cheltenham Bible Conference, Brighton, Wrexham, Soul By The Sea and Gloucester have been titled "Phatfish and Lou Fellingham". Phatfish and Lou Fellingham have also led worship at the Mission:Worship conference alongside Stuart Townend and Matt Redman in Eastbourne. Additionally, they participated on the Mission:Worship album released by Kingsway Music/Survivor Records titled A New Day Of Worship.

Fellingham is back on the latest Phatfish album In Jesus, released in June 2009. She has continued to perform on the In Jesus tour over the past year and has done many one-night events including unplugged concerts, a special event at Westminster Abbey, and the Premier Radio Woman to Woman Northern conference in Manchester.

=== Worship leading ===
Since their formation, and even before, Phatfish has been called upon as a worship band to lead and assist others at conferences and their local church. Fellingham serves her home church, the Church of Christ the King, as the director of their 50-member worship choir.

Throughout 2008 and 2009, Fellingham has led worship and performed at events such as Keswick Ministries, New Word Alive, Kingsway Children's Conference, Radiant, Newfrontiers, Newday, and other artists such as Tim Hughes at Mission:Worship. She appeared at The Big Church Day Out and Pentecost Festival with Phatfish. There were also appearances and engagements leading worship with Matt Redman, Stuart Townend, Martyn Layzell and others. The Newfrontiers organised conferences, Together On A Mission and Newday, gathered crowds of up to 6,000 people. The largest crowds were at the Stoneleigh Bible Week, where in its final year, there was a record 26,000 persons in attendance.

In an interview with Tony Cummings for Cross Rhythms, Fellingham was asked whether she was comfortable with the label "worship leader".

The way I understand the role of the "worship leader" at this time, it doesn't bother me if that is part of who I am. The best thing about "leading worship" is when the people as a whole worship together. I believe in a worshipping community but when the numbers reach a certain level I don't think it's inappropriate to have someone anointed and gifted to help guide the way.

—Lou Fellingham

Fellingham and the band offer practical advice about Christian music and leading worship on their 2006 release Working As A Band double-disc CD. They teach this material at worship seminars and one-day events, as well as the annual Mission:Worship conference in Eastbourne.

Fellingham has also led worship at international conferences in England, Scotland and Wales. The band was the runners up at the Christian Web and Blog Awards, attended by the Bishop of London, in the "Most Original Worship Blog/Website" category. They came second to Tim Hughes' and Al Gordon's win for their website worshipcentral.org.

=== Collaborations ===
Since forming Phatfish, Fellingham travelled the UK working and collaborating with numerous Christian artists and worship leaders, in addition to performing at various conferences and events. With her breakout solo singing career, she has been involved in several collaborative projects with various Christian events including worship conferences, leadership conferences, women's conferences, music festivals, and stadium concerts, usually alongside the band Phatfish.

In 1991, Newfrontiers started the Stoneleigh Bible Week in Coventry, England. These were conferences gathering UK charismatics/restorationists to hear preaching from various apostolic figures and international speakers. The event gathered up to 26,000 people from around the world for teaching and celebration. During this time, Fellingham was featured on the Stoneleigh recordings published by Kingsway Music.

Since Stoneleigh, Fellingham has been regularly requested to lead worship at other major Christian events including Newday and Spring Harvest. She has appeared on numerous compilation albums, including the Newfrontiers live albums from Stoneleigh to the more recent, Newday. Fellingham has also been involved in training worship leaders and singers through the Church of Christ the King's worship school.

She worked with Mary Mary singer Erica Campbell and gospel singer Jason Bailley on the track "Angels" featured on the collaborative album One Voice released by Kingsway Music in 2009. The album pulled together over 200 Christian artists and musicians. The list of performers reads like a who's who of Christian music: Darlene Zschech, Martin Smith, Smokie Norful, Tim Hughes, Israel Houghton, Nu Colours, Kierra Kiki Sheard, Brenton Brown, Warryn Campbell, Tommy Sims, Muyiwa, Mal Pope, Matt Redman, Rance Allen, Bishop John Francis, Tre Sheppard and Noel Robinson.

The album is the brain child of London Community Gospel Choir co-founder Lawrence Johnson, inspired after he watched the devastation from the Boxing Day tsunami in 2004 with horror. Just a few short weeks later, and with the help of Les Moir (Survivor Records), 150 artists answered the call and turned up at the famed Abbey Road Studios in London to begin a journey that has been four years in the making.

"One Voice, One Heart" is a charity single recorded in February 2005 and released at Easter to raise funds for the survivors of the South East Asia tsunami, as well as women's conferences up and down the UK - but her most widely viewed appearances are on BBC's Songs of Praise.

In 2007, Fellingham featured on the Songs of Praise performing songs including "In Christ Alone" (a rebroadcast of 1 February 2004), "See What A Morning", "My Heart Is Filled With Thankfulness", "Knowing Your Grace" and "I Will Say". "I Will Say" was also featured on Spring Harvest albums Shine and Liz Babbs' meditative Immerse. Fellingham's version of "In Christ Alone" was used as a backing track to a radio advertising campaign by Jonathan Gledhill, the Bishop of Lichfield on Beacon Radio, Classic Gold, Signal 1 and Signal 2 in September 2007. This version can also be found on YouTube in various videos popularising the song.

Drummer Nathan Fellingham was the driving force behind the album Trinity, released 2006. It is a compilation of tracks from many artists including Phatfish; the songs focusing on the Trinitarian nature of God.

They have also appeared at events such as Spring Harvest, Soul Survivor, Keswick Convention, Bognor Regis Bible Week, Radiant, Women Walking With God, Kingsway Children's Ministry, Cheltenham Bible Week, Mission:Worship, Festival Manchester, New Word Alive and Worship Together in the United States and Canada.

Stuart Townend has been present at some of the recordings, although Lou Fellingham performed his "In Christ Alone" in 2005 when it featured on the list of the "10 most popular hymns in Britain".

==== Individual collaborations ====
- Matt Redman
- Tim Hughes
- Graham Kendrick
- Simon Brading
- Stuart Townend
- Brian Houston
- Aaron Keyes
- Evan Rogers
- Andreana Argana
- Mark Edwards
- Cathy Burton
- Yfriday
- Martyn Layzell
- Erica Campbell
- Jason Bailley
- Liz Babbs
- Kate Simmonds
- Gary Sadler
- Kingsway Music
- Busbee

== Album releases ==
Whether fronting the band Phatfish or performing as a solo artist Fellingham has been described as "one of the most distinctive voices in Christian music." Fellingham has stated that her heart is to communicate the love of God through song. Her desire is to express truth, feed the church and bring revelation of God through her singing and songwriting.

Her first solo release Treasure shot to the number one spot, becoming best-selling album of 2006 through Cross Rhythms. Her second release, Promised Land, received the Gold Award from the Christian Broadcasting Council, which recognised the album as the "Worship Album of 2008".

In May 2010, Fellingham's third solo album, Step Into the Light, was released. A special launch party and concert was held on 24 May 2010 at Komedia in Brighton. The concert was sold out.

=== Treasure ===
In 2006, Fellingham's first solo album, entitled Treasure, was released. Fellingham wrote most of the songs on the album, while her husband was co-writer. The project was published by Kingsway Music and produced by Michael Busbee, an American songwriter known professionally as Busbee. The album was recorded in Los Angeles.

In the Cross Rhythms interview with Tony Cummings, Fellingham explained the thoughts behind the title song, "Treasure".

There were two mighty men of God in our movement of churches, Newfrontiers. One fighting fit and looked the full bill of health and could go on for years. The other had been suffering with sickness for years, wheelchair bound and looked like he should have passed away years ago. Anyway, God decided to take them at the same time. Both were a shock and very sobering. It reminded me of that Scripture in 2 Corinthians 4 where it talks about having "treasure in jars of clay". The one who seemed to be so strong on the outside, still in fact had the gospel in a jar of clay, as did the one who seemed like his jar should have broken a long time ago, but God had other plans. They were both filled with the Holy Spirit and were great testimonies of men of faith.

—Lou Fellingham

The track "Hard Pressed" was released as a radio single, receiving airplay in the U.S. and on online-based Christian radio stations. The album was Cross Rhythms' best selling album for 2006 and received a positive review from Tony Cummings of Cross Rhythms, referring to Fellingham as one of the best worship leaders in today's church. Fellingham said of the album:

That song came about when my family, particularly my Mum, was going through an extremely hard time. One that didn't seem to make any sense, one that we had no control over, one that was very painful. I actually wrote the first verse a long time ago, but then when it came time to doing the album we decided to develop the song. There are times when faith seems weak, even non-existent and you can barely open your mouth to speak to God, but that doesn't mean that he's not looking after you and sometimes we just have to fall on God and not say anything. His arms are big enough.

—Lou Fellingham

Following the success of Treasure, Fellingham teamed up with Stuart Townend for a "Stu and Lou" tour with Phatfish. The tour took them to various places around the UK with Fellingham performing tracks from Treasure, while Stuart performed selected tracks from his album, Monument to Mercy.

=== Promised Land ===
Fellingham released her second solo album, Promised Land in May 2008. Busbee produced the album and helped to write the songs, 13 of which were written over three days in Brighton. While Fellingham's first album, Treasure, has been described as being a very "pastoral" album, Fellingham considers Promised Land to be more evangelistic, saying, "It speaks of God's people, the journey we're on, the power of the Gospel and our future, with Jesus, in Heaven."

An exclusive launch night at the Clarendon Centre was planned with only 150 tickets where Fellingham, backed by Phatfish, performed each track from her new album and talked about the inspiration behind them. An article appeared on the Cross Rhythms website with similar content of Fellingham talking about the songs from the album.

The album received a positive review from Tony Cummings of Cross Rhythms, calling it Fellingham's best work yet. In 2008, the album received a Gold Award from the Christian Broadcasting Council in the category of "Best Christian Worship Music Album".

=== Step Into The Light ===
In early 2010, Fellingham met with Christian songwriter and musician Gary Sadler, who wrote Ancient of Days to write new material for her third album, entitled, Step Into The Light. It was released in May 2010 and launched at a special concert held at the Komedia in Brighton. The concert was sold out.

The album includes a new version of the Fanny Crosby hymn "To God Be the Glory". Published by Kingsway Music and produced by keyboardist Mark Edwards, the album features various individuals that have worked with highly successful musical artists.

- Troy Miller (drums) — drummer for Amy Winehouse
- Stu G (lead guitar) — lead guitarist, backing vocalist, and songwriter for the rock band Delirious?
- Lawrence Johnson (background vocals) — choir arrangement for Leona Lewis' Echo album released in 2009
- LaDonna Harley-Peters (background vocals) — background vocals for Corinne Bailey Rae

=== Made For You (Live) ===
In April 2019 Made For You (Live) was released.

== Songwriting ==
List of works by Lou Fellingham
"Song"	Artist	(Co-writers)
"All I Have And All I Am" (Build This House)		
"Amazing Love"		
"Believe The Truth" (Spinning)		
"Come Let Us Enter"		
"Coming Home"		
"God Immortal Invisible"		
"God Of Earth And Sky" (In You)		
"God Of Mercy" (Prayer Song)		
"Holy Ground"		
"I Am Hard Pressed" (Hard Pressed)		
"I Am Yours"		
"I Will Say" (You Give Rest To The Weary)		
"O God Of Love" (How Good It Is)		
"On Eagle's Wings"		
"Once I Was Dead To You" (Promised Land)		
"River Of Life"		
"Second Best"		
"Sing To The Lord"		
"Stepping Out"		
"There's A Sound That Comes From Heaven" (Restoration Song)		
"We Believe You're A God" (Breathe)		
"We Have This Treasure" (Treasure)		
"Who Could Understand" (Christ Crucified)		
"Worship The Lord"		
"Your Love"		

== Discography ==
Lou Fellingham discography
Year	Title	Label	Type
2006	Treasure	Kingsway Music	Studio
2008	Promised Land	Kingsway Music	Studio
2010	Step Into The Light	Kingsway Music	Studio
2012	Best of Lou Fellingham Live	Kingsway Music	Live
2014	Fascinate	Integrity Music	Studio
2017	This Changes Everything	Integrity Music	Studio
2018	Lou Fellingham Ultimate Collection	Integrity Music	Compilation
2019	Made For You	Integrity Music	Studio
2020	Come & Adore Him	Freedom Sounds	Studio
2021	Lean On The Everlasting Arms (Hymns, Vol. 1)	Wings Music Group	Studio
2022	Songs For Easter	Wings Music Group	Studio
Phatfish discography
Year	Title	Label	Type
1994	Purple Phatfish		
1995	River of Life		
1996	Neworldisorder		
1997	We Know the Story		
1999	Purple Through the Fishtank	Pamplin Records	
2000	An Audience with God		
2001	Heavenbound	Authentic Media	
2002	Hope - Unplugged Live		
2003	Nothing But The Truth		
2004	Faithful: The Worship Songs		
2006	Trinity		
2006	Working As A Band		
2006	There Is A Day - The Video Collection		
2007	Guaranteed		
2008	15 (The Anniversary Collection)		
2009	In Jesus		
2011	Higher		
2014	Phatfish Live		
Contributions to live recordings
Year	Title/Artist	Label	Type
2002	Soul Survivor - Glimpses Of Glory		
2002	Newfrontiers - Live 2002	Kingsway Music	
2003	Newfrontiers - Does The Future Have A Church?		
2003	Soul Survivor - Anthem Of The Free		
2003	Spring Harvest - Live Worship 2003		
2004	Newfrontiers - The Passion Of God's Son		
2004	Newday - A Generation Is Emerging	Survivor Records	
2004	Soul Survivor - Dancing Generation		
2005	Live 2005		
2005	Soul Sista	Survivor Records	
2005	Newfrontiers - The Power Of The Cross		
2005	Newday - You Reign		
2006	Live 2006		
2006	Newfrontiers - Praise Is Rising		
2006	Newday - Shout From The Roof		
2006	Enter In: The Lost UK Worship Sessions		
2007	The Best Live Worship Songs... Ever	Kingsway Music	
2007	Live 2007		
2007	Just One Touch From The King	Kingsway Music	
2007	Newfrontiers - Amazing God		
2007	Newday - Let The Rain Come		
2007	Unshackled! Living In Outrageous Grace		
2008	Live 2008	Kingsway Music	
2008	The Voice Of Hope	Kingsway Music	
2008	Keswick - Live	Elevation Music	
2009	Live 2009	Kingsway Music	
2009	Mission:Worship - Revive	Kingsway Music	
2008	Newday - The Sound Of A New Generation	Survivor Records	
2008	Newfrontiers Live - Salvation's Song	Kingsway Music	
2008	Newday Live - This Is Life	Survivor Records	
Album collaborations and compilations
Year	Title/Artist	Label	Type
2002	Where Angels Fear To Tread by Matt Redman		
2005	One Voice One Heart		
2006	Monument To Mercy by Stuart Townend		
2007	Mission:Worship - Hymns	Kingsway Music	
2007	Worship At The Abbey	Star Song Music	
2007	A Woman's Worship - 30 Songs Of Worship	Kingsway Music	
2007	Best Worship Songs... Ever!	Worship Together	
2007	More... Best Worship Songs Ever!	Kingsway Music	
2007	The Best New Worship Songs... Ever!	Kingsway Music	
2007	The Best Of Stuart Townend Live		
2008	50 Worship Anthems	Star Song Music	
2008	Mission:Worship - A New Day Of Worship	Kingsway Music	
2008	The Best Modern Hymns... Ever!	Kingsway Music	
2008	Just Worship	Kingsway Music	
2008	Love Mercy - Songs of Worship and Justice	Kingsway Music	
2008	Heart of Worship	Kingsway Music	
2008	Tune Into Worship	Kingsway Music	
2008	Radiant - 50 Worship Songs by Women for Women	Kingsway Music	
2008	The Veil Torn	Kingsway Music	
2008	Hymns Past & Present	Kingsway Music	
2008	Love Songs from Heaven...The Worship Songs of Noel Richards	Kingsway Music	
2008	100% Worship		
2008	Kingsway New Songs 08/09	Kingsway Music	
2008	Mark Edwards - Hymn To Grace	Kingsway Music	

== Music videos ==
Year	Song	Album	Director(s)
2020	"Glad Tidings"	Come & Adore Him	Simeon Lumgair, Quirky Motion
2020	"Hark! The Herald Angels Sing"	Single	Simeon Lumgair, Quirky Motion
2020	"Fix My Eyes (Ibe 'Giantkiller' Remix) ft. Renzo BA"	Single	Simeon Lumgair, Quirky Motion
