= Martyn Layzell =

Martyn Layzell (born 1975) is a British worship leader and Anglican clergyman. Since 2020, he has been Vicar of St Mark's, Battersea Rise, a Church of England church in London. He is also a worship leader and has regularly led worship at major Christian events including Soul Survivor and New Wine. He features on several live albums from those events both as a singer and a songwriter. He has produced three studio albums, Reward; in collaboration with Tim Hughes, and Lost in Wonder and Turn my Face, with Lost in Wonder winning Christian Booksellers Convention Worship Album of the Year 2004.

== Background ==
Layzell grew up attending St Andrew's Church in Chorleywood where Mike Pilavachi was his youth leader. After a psychology degree at Birmingham University, he moved to Soul Survivor Watford, where he latterly worked as a worship pastor. He moved to St Aldate's Church in Oxford, after six years at Soul Survivor, to take up the position of worship director.

He then did a two-year Diploma in Ministry at Wycliffe Hall, Oxford, an evangelical Anglican theological college, between 2008 and 2010. He was ordained in the Church of England as a deacon by the Bishop of London at Holy Trinity Brompton (HTB) in September 2010, and as a priest in 2011. From 2010 to 2020, he ministered at HTB, first as a curate and then as an associate vicar. In 2020, he was appointed vicar of St Mark's, Battersea Rise in the Diocese of Southwark.

== Discography ==
- Lost in Wonder (EMI CMG, 2003)

1. With all my heart
2. Sovereign Lord
3. Lost in wonder
4. Praise You
5. Jesus Christ Emmanuel
6. You opened up my eyes
7. King Jesus I believe
8. Devoted
9. I'll never stop loving You
10. All of me
11. I surrender all

- Turn my Face (Survivor Records, 2006)

1. Join the Song
2. For Your glory
3. Turn my face
4. Through Your precious blood
5. I stand in awe
6. Immortal, Invisible
7. Holding On
8. If I should ever falter
9. More than anything
10. As Jesus walked

== See also ==
- Nicky Gumbel
- Tim Hughes
- Nicky Lee
- Matt Redman
