= Happy Day (album) =

Live album by Tim Hughes
- Released: March 14, 2009
- Recorded: September 2008
- Studio: ICC Studios (Sussex, UK); Berwick Lane (Atlanta, Georgia, USA)
- Genre: Rock, Christian rock
- Length: 56:00
- Label: Survivor
- Producer: Nathan Nockels / DVD Directed by Andy Hutch

Tim Hughes chronology
| Holding Nothing Back (2007) | Happy Day (2009) | Love Shine Through (2011) |

Happy Day is a live album by British worship leader Tim Hughes. In September 2008, Hughes attended Shepherd's Bush Empire in London, England, to record a live concert album and DVD. 2,000 fans attended the event. The album was released on 14 March 2009, to many positive reviews. British guitarist Stu G of Delirious? also performed at the event, and a duet of 'Here I Am To Worship' was performed with Martin Smith. Rap act 29th Chapter also dueted with Hughes on the song 'Dance'.

== Track listing ==
Standard edition
| No. | Title | Writer(s) | Length |
|---|---|---|---|
| 1. | "Jesus Saves" | Tim Hughes | 3:58 |
| 2. | "Beautiful One" | Tim Hughes | 3:42 |
| 3. | "Give Us Your Courage" | Tim Hughes | 5:08 |
| 4. | "Here I Am To Worship" | Tim Hughes | 6:50 |
| 5. | "Remember" | Tim Hughes | 4:06 |
| 6. | "Happy Day" | Tim Hughes, Ben Cantelon | 3:16 |
| 7. | "Dance" | Tim Hughes | 4:28 |
| 8. | "Consuming Fire" | Tim Hughes | 4:41 |
| 9. | "Everything" | Tim Hughes | 4:31 |
| 10. | "We Won't Stay Silent" | CompassionArt | 3:21 |
| 11. | "God of Justice" | Tim Hughes | 5:24 |
| 12. | "When I Survey" | Isaac Watts | 6:41 |

== Personnel ==
- Tim Hughes – lead vocals, acoustic guitars
- Nathan Nockels – keyboards
- Stu G – guitars
- Alex Nifong – guitars
- Mark Prentice – bass
- Dan Needham – drums
- Lucy Payne – cello
- Andreana Arganda – backing vocals
- Quintin Delport – backing vocals
- Ian Pitter – backing vocals
- Hope Plumb – backing vocals
- Martin Smith – guest lead vocals (4)
- The 29th Chapter – rappers (7)
- Sacred – dancers

=== Production ===
- Tim Hughes – executive producer
- Les Moir – executive producer
- Nathan Nockels – producer, additional recording
- Neil Costello – additional recording
- Peter Lozinski – additional recording
- Sam Gibson – mixing at Chapel Lane Studios (Hereford, UK)
- Geoff Pesche – mastering at Abbey Road Studios (London, UK)
- Andy Colthart – photography
- Stewart Smith – design

Live crew

- Simon Ward – production manager
- Tom Redman – stage manager
- Paul Burton – FOH sound
- Mark Wilson – FOH sound assistant
- Trevor Michael – stage sound
- Colin Hounsome – stage sound assistant
- Dave Moore – design operator
- John Dawson Butterworth – lighting assistant
- Richard Luke – lighting technician
- Craig Lawrence – projection
- Lee Slater – backline technician

DVD

- Andy Hutch – director
- Ryan Reddick – producer
- James Quintin – editor
- Mark Debnam – projection visual
- James Ward – projection visual
- Rob Wilson – projection visual
- David Johnson – Worship Central videos
