= Set Apart =

Live album by Worship Central
- Released: October 28, 2014
- Genre: Worship
- Length: 68:56
- Label: Integrity
- Producer: Ben Cantelon, Tim Hughes

Set Apart is a live album from Worship Central. Integrity Music released the album on October 28, 2014. They worked with Ben Cantelon and Tim Hughes, in the production of this album.

== Critical reception ==
Professional ratings
Review scores
Source	Rating
365 Days of Inspiring Media	4/5 stars
All about Worship	3/5 stars
Cross Rhythms	9/10 squares
Louder Than the Music	5/5 stars
New Release Today	4/5 stars
Worship Leader	4.5/5 stars

Awarding the album four and a half stars at Worship Leader, Bobby Gilles states, "Set Apart is a can't-miss collection." Stella Redburn, rating the album a nine out of ten for Cross Rhythms, writes, "Worship Central continue to lay down a benchmark for other worship ministries." Giving the album four stars from New Release Today, Caitlin Lassiter describes, "Set Apart seems to have served its purpose: empowering believers and giving new songs for the church to lift up to the King." Jonathan Andre, assigning the album four star at 365 Days of Inspiring Media, says, "such an encouraging and uplifiting album!" Indicating in a five star review for Louder Than the Music, Jono Davies writes, "It didn't take long for this album to become an instant classic in my household." Mathew Reames, signaling in a three star review from All about Worship, states, "In the end this is a fine album, but doesn’t really wow."

== Awards and accolades ==
This album was No. 9 on the Worship Leader's Top 20 Albums of 2014 list.

== Track listing ==
No.	Title	Writer(s)	Length
1.	"The Way" (featuring Tim Hughes)	Ben Cantelon, Nick Herbert, Tim Hughes	4:44
2.	"Stand Up" (featuring Luke Hellebronth)	Luke Hellebronth, Herbert	5:34
3.	"Can't Stop Your Love" (featuring Ben Cantelon)	Cantelon, Herbert, Jason Ingram	5:53
4.	"Set Apart" (featuring Tim Hughes)	Cantelon, Herbert, Hellebronth, Hughes	6:34
5.	"Pursue Me" (featuring Luke Hellebronth)	Cantelon, Hellebronth, Daniela Hogger, Hughes	4:25
6.	"Awesome Is He" (featuring Anna Hellebronth)	Cantelon, Nikki Fletcher, Hellebronth, Hughes, Tom Smith	4:44
7.	"Worth It All" (featuring Ben Cantelon)	Cantelon, Benji Cowart, Ingram, Smith	5:35
8.	"All That I Am" (Spontaneous Song)		2:47
9.	"Enough Light" (featuring Ben Cantelon)	Cantelon, Herbert	4:10
10.	"Let Go" (featuring Tim Hughes)	Cantelon, Herbert, Hughes	3:44
11.	"Your Cross Is Enough" (featuring Luke Hellebronth)	Hellebronth, Herbert, Hughes, Evan Wickham	4:43
12.	"Dead Things to Life" (featuring Ben Cantelon)	Cantelon, Tom Reed, Joel Wardle	5:48
13.	"Singing over Us" (featuring Karen Gillespie)	Tom Eccleshall, Stephen William	6:32
14.	"Wide Open Space" (Spontaneous Song)		3:43
Total length:			68:56
