= As Sure as the Stars =

As Sure As The Stars

Studio album by onehundredhours
- Released: 20 July 2007
- Genre: Contemporary Christian music Christian rock
- Length: 44:24
- Label: Survivor
- Producer: Nathan Dantzler

Onehundredhours chronology
Stronger Than My Heart (2004)	As Sure As The Stars (2007)

As Sure as the Stars is the fourth album released by onehundredhours on the Survivor Records label. It was released on 20 July 2007. Many of the tracks were first played to audiences who attended the New Wine and Soul Survivor festivals in the following weeks.

It was rated a nine out of ten by Cross Rhythms.

== Track list ==
1. Home (2:51)
2. Almost There (2:50)
3. Forever Over Us (4:11)
4. Mercy Day (3:30)
5. Hold On (3:52)
6. Love Rescue Me (4:10)
7. Remember (3:46)
8. Come As You Are (3:36)
9. I Can't See Myself (2:29)
10. She (3:20)
11. Safe in Your Hands (4:16)
12. Love Come Take Me Home (5:32)
