= Worship Central =

British Christian band

Worship Central is a British Christian music praise and worship charity from Birmingham, United Kingdom, founded at Holy Trinity Brompton in 2006 by Tim Hughes and Al Gordon. The charity exists to train worship pastors for churches as well as writing and producing new music for churches.

== Background ==
The charity was founded in 2006 out of London, United Kingdom, where they were located at Holy Trinity Brompton, while now they are based at Gas Street Church. Notable staff members and associate songwriters include Tim Hughes, Ben Cantelon, Al Gordon and Luke Hellebronth.

== History ==
Worship Central released their first album, Lifting High, in 2009, then Spirit Break Out, in 2011, Counting On Your Name, also in 2011, Let It Be Known in 2012, Set Apart in 2014, Mercy Road in 2017 and Stir A Passion in 2018.

Their albums have been recorded by the labels Integrity Music and Capitol Records. Let It Be Known reached number 45 in the UK Official Album Charts and lasted a record five weeks at number 1 at the Official Christian And Gospel Chart

== Discography ==
List of albums, with selected chart positions
Title	Album details	Peak chart positions in the UK
Lifting High	Released: 2009; Format: CD, digital download	-
Spirit Break Out	Released: 2011; Format: CD, digital download	48
Counting on Your Name	Released: 2011; Format: CD, digital download	-
Let It Be Known	Released: 2012; Format: CD, digital download	45
Set Apart	Released: 2014; Format: CD, digital download	66
Mercy Road	Released: 2017; Format: CD, digital download	-
Stir A Passion	Released: 2018; Format: CD, digital download	-
"—" denotes a recording that did not chart or was not released in that territory.
