= Cardiphonia =

Studio album by onehundredhours
- Released: 19 April 2002
- Genre: Contemporary Christian music, Christian rock
- Label: Emerge
- Producer: Paul Burton

Onehundredhours chronology
Lift (2001)	Cardiphonia (2002)	Stronger Than My Heart (2004)

Cardiphonia is the second album released by onehundredhours. It was released on Soul Survivor's Emerge label in 2002.

== Track listing ==
1. I Won't Let the Rocks Cry Out (3:43)
2. Taste and See (4:10)
3. You Are Holy (4:43)
4. Were There Words (4:10)
5. You Have Been So Good to Me (4:12)
6. Close to Me (3:37)
7. At the Foot of the Cross (4:52)

== 2005 Re-Release ==
After the success of Stronger Than My Heart, Cardiphonia and Lift were both re-released by Survivor Records in a 2 compact disc set in 2005. This was met with kind regard by critics and fans alike, as the independent releases would be available to be bought together and would receive an increased publicity.
