= Onehundredhours =

Christian rock band

- Genres: Rock; Christian rock
- Years active: 2001–2009
- Label: Survivor
- Members: Tré Sheppard; Tori Sheppard; Paul Baker; Mark Prentice; Steve Evans; Johnny Ravn

Onehundredhours (also known among fans as '100h', or 'the hours') were a Christian rock band, headed by Tré Sheppard. They performed from 1997 to 2009.

== History ==
The band initially started by accident an initial one-off gig, when Tré was asked to lead worship at a youth Cell-Church conference in 1997, which resulted in their first tour, of California after they were invited by the conference speakers. Following this, the band released 2 independent records, which sold in excess of 16,000 copies. Onehundredhours were then signed up by the Christian record label Survivor. Since then, another 2 albums have been released, assisting in the growth of the band's popularity, in the UK and also within Europe, where many tours have taken place. They are also regular guests to Spring Harvest and Soul Survivor festivals, as well as New Wine.

In 1998, the band started ‘’The Factory’’ mission with Youth With A Mission.

In 2005, Onehundredhours supported Daniel Bedingfield on his UK & European tour. Daniel, a long-time friend of Onehundredhours, gave a personal invitation for the band to guest on the tour.

In 2006, the band toured throughout the UK, touring with Tree63 on their UK dates in December. Furthermore, on 11 May 2008 Onehundredhours played at the Astoria Theatre as part of the 'Live at the Court' celebration, which made up a number of events in the London-wide Pentecost festival. They shared the stage on this occasion with The Gentlemen, Electric Church and headliners Salvador.

In 2009, the band played their last gig at Soul Survivor Week C.

In 2019, Sheppard became Associate Pastor at Causeway Coast Vineyard Church in Northern Ireland; he has since left the post in late 2025 and is currently studying to become an ordained minister in the Church of Ireland.

== Name ==
The Band's name comes from the average amount of free time a Christian has each week, inspired by the book 'The Other Hundred Hours' by Wyn Fountain. The process on which it works is as follows:
There are 7 x 24 = 168 hours in a week
If you spend 8 hours sleeping per day, this makes 7 × 8 = 56 hours per week
So extracting the time spent sleeping, that leaves 112 hours a week. 12 hours is about the maximum time one can spend in church, at bible studies, or youth groups etc. That leaves 100 hours, and the band wanted to say that this doesn't need to be 100 hours without God, but instead that worship should be a lifestyle, which spans all our time.

== Members ==
- Tré Sheppard
- Tori Sheppard
- Tim Cooke
- Mark Prentice
- Steve Evans
- Jonny Ravn

== Discography ==
- One Hundred Hours (1999)
- Lift (2001)
- Cardiphonia (2002)
- Stronger Than My Heart (2004)
- As Sure as the Stars (2007)

== engagehivaids.com ==
Engagehivaids.com was set up by Onehundredhours in 2004. It is a web-based community created, in partnership with the iThemba AIDS Foundation, to raise awareness for the HIV/AIDS crisis in Africa. To date, many campaigns have been run, including selling red rubber wrist bands, a texting service, and selling badges. The ultimate goal is for the band's heart to inspire, challenge and resource young people to live their lives with justice, hope, action and love at the core to bring about change for people affected by HIV/AIDS.
