= Holding Nothing Back =

Studio album by Tim Hughes
- Released: 2007
- Studios: Chapel Lane Studios (Hereford, UK); Livingston Studios (London, UK); Conway Studios (Hollywood, California); Berwick Lane (Atlanta, Georgia)
- Genre: Christian Worship
- Length: 49:24
- Label: Sparrow/Survivor
- Producers: Nathan Nockels; Matt Bronleewe

Tim Hughes chronology
When Silence Falls (2004)	Holding Nothing Back (2007)	Happy Day (2009)

Holding Nothing Back is the third Christian music album by Tim Hughes, which was released on April 3, 2007.

== Track listing ==
All songs written by Tim Hughes, except where noted.

1. "Happy Day" (Tim Hughes, Ben Cantelon) - 3:23
2. "The Highest and the Greatest" (Tim Hughes, Nick Herbert) - 5:32
3. "Everything" - 4:30
4. "Holding Nothing Back" - 3:44
5. "Clinging to the Cross" [featuring Brooke Fraser] - 5:16
6. "Almighty God" - 3:35
7. "God of Justice" - 7:00
8. "Out of the Darkness" (Rachel Hughes, Tim Hughes) - 3:27
9. "Centre of It All" - 4:31
10. "Living for Your Glory" (Rachel Hughes, Tim Hughes) - 4:27
11. "Take the World" - 3:59

== Personnel ==
- Tim Hughes – vocals, backing vocals
- Nathan Nockels – acoustic piano (1–3, 5, 7–9), keyboards (1–3, 5, 7–9), programming (1–3, 5, 7–9), acoustic guitars (1–3, 5, 7–9), electric guitars (1–3, 5, 7–9), backing vocals (1–3, 5, 7–9)
- Patrick Warren – keyboards (4, 6, 10, 11)
- Gary Burnette – electric guitars (1–3, 5, 7–9)
- Michael Guy Chislett – electric guitars (1–3, 5, 7–9)
- Stu G – electric guitars (1–3, 5, 7–9)
- Dan Wheeler – electric guitars (1–3, 5, 7–9)
- Bruce Gaitsch – acoustic guitars (4, 6, 10, 11)
- Paul Moak – electric guitars (4, 6, 10, 11), additional instrumention (4, 6, 10, 11)
- Lyle Workman – electric guitars (4, 6, 10, 11)
- Chris Donohue – bass (1–3, 5, 7–9)
- Matt Weeks – bass (1–3, 5, 7–9)
- James Gregory – bass (4, 6, 10, 11)
- Paul Evans – drums (1–3, 5, 7–9)
- Dan Needham – drums (1–3, 5, 7–9)
- David Raven – drums (4, 6, 10, 11)
- Matt King – percussion (1–3, 5, 7–9), loops (1–3, 5, 7–9)
- Lawrence Johnson – backing vocals (1–3, 5, 7–9)
- Brooke Fraser – vocals (5)

Choir

- Jamie J. Morgan, Jeff Schmidt, Scott Sheriff and Andrea Springall

=== Production ===
- Les Moir – executive producer
- Brad O'Donnell – executive producer
- Nate Yetton – executive producer
- Nathan Nockels – producer (1–3, 5, 7–9), overdubbing (1–3, 5, 7–9)
- Matt Bronleewe – producer (4, 6, 10, 11)
- Joe Baldridge – recording
- Sam Gibson – recording
- Aaron Swihart – recording (4, 6, 10, 11)
- Alex Scannell – recording (8)
- Darrell Lehman – assistant engineer
- Seth Waldmann – assistant engineer
- Rusty Varenkamp – editing (4, 6, 10, 11)
- Shane D. Wilson – mixing
- Kip Kubin – mix assistant
- Lani Crump – mix coordinator
- Sarah Deane – mix coordinator
- Dave Stuenbrink – mix coordinator, production coordinator (4, 6, 10, 11)
- Hank Williams – mastering at MasterMix (Nashville, Tennessee)
- Alicia Lewis – production coordinator (1–3, 5, 7–9)
- Jess Chambers – A&R administration
- Jan Cook – creative director
- Tim Frank – art direction
- JT Daly – design, artwork
