= Stronger Than My Heart =

Studio album by onehundredhours
- Released: Spring 2004
- Genre: Contemporary Christian music, Christian rock
- Label: Survivor
- Producer: Tom Mills and Paul Burton

Onehundredhours chronology
Cardiphonia (2002)	Stronger Than My Heart (2004)	As Sure As The Stars (2007)

Stronger Than My Heart is the third album from the Christian rock band onehundredhours, and was their first widely available album on the Survivor Records label.

== Track list ==
1. King of Every Heart (3.39)
2. He is Good (4.12)
3. I Believe in Love (4.04)
4. Light it Up (3.07)
5. O Love, My Love (4.53)
6. You Are The One (4.43)
7. River Wide (4.33)
8. All of Me (2.36)
9. One Day (4.49)
10. Make Me Okay (3.22)

== Special edition ==
In 2005, a special edition of Stronger Than My Heart was released. Paul Hicks, who has worked with bands such as Coldplay, Placebo and Travis in the secular stream, remixed the track 'King of Every Heart'. This was accompanied by a video of the song which was directed by Andy Hutch, who in the past has experience of working with The Thrills and Propellerheads.
