= Love Takes Over =

Live album by Soul Survivor
- Released: 13 November 2015
- Genre: Worship, Christian pop
- Length: 62:06
- Label: Integrity

Soul Survivor chronology
The Flood (2013)	Love Takes Over (2015)	Never Gonna Stop (2016)

Love Takes Over is the live album from Soul Survivor. Integrity Music released the album on 13 November 2015.

== Critical reception ==
Professional ratings
Review scores
Source	Rating
365 Days of Inspiring Media	4/5 stars
Cross Rhythms	8/10 squares
Louder Than the Music	5/5 stars

Giving the album an eight out of ten at Cross Rhythms, Matt McChlery says, "recommended." Jono Davies, rating the album five stars for Louder Than the music, writes, "the worship sounds...ringing out is captured beautifully on this recording." Awarding the album four stars from 365 Days of Inspiring Media, Jonathan Andre states, "such an awe-inspiring and compelling set of 11 tracks!"

== Track listing ==
No.	Title	Artist(s)	Length
1.	"Love Takes Over"	Beth Croft	4:05
2.	"Dynamite"	Tom Smith	4:48
3.	"Take My Heart"	Tom Smith	5:30
4.	"Hope and Glory"	Tim Hughes	5:59
5.	"Boldly I Approach"	Rend Collective	6:00
6.	"The Way"	Beth Croft	4:27
7.	"This Is Living"	Tom Smith	3:37
8.	"Rule in My Heart"	Beth Croft	5:51
9.	"Pocketful of Faith"	Tim Hughes	6:39
10.	"Hold On"	Beth Croft	6:56
11.	"End of Me"	Tom Smith	8:14
Total length:			62:06

== Chart performance ==
Chart (2015)	Peak position
Christian & Gospel Albums (OCC)	1
