= Beth Croft =

- Born: Beth Emily Coulson; 13 October 1986 (age 39); Watford, England
- Genres: CCM, worship
- Occupations: Singer, songwriter
- Instruments: vocals, singer-songwriter Guitar
- Years active: 2014–present
- Labels: Integrity, Survivor
- Website: weareworship.com/uk/writers/beth-croft/

Beth Emily Croft (née, Coulson; born 13 October 1986) is an English Christian musician, who primarily plays a contemporary Christian style of worship music. She released, Rule in My Heart, with Integrity Music alongside Survivor Records, in 2014.

== Early life ==
Beth Croft was born on 13 October 1986, as Beth Emily Coulson, in Watford, England, where her parents raised her along with her two younger brothers, Tim and Stephen, in the church. It was not until her mid-teenage years, where her faith would blossom and flourish, when her parents changed churches to Soul Survivor. Croft is now a worship director at Soul Survivor. She went to college at the University of Bath, studying mathematics.

== Music career ==
Croft's music recording career commenced in 2014, with the release, Rule in My Heart, by Integrity Music alongside Survivor Records, on 27 July 2014. She is also showcased on the Soul Survivor albums, The Flood, Love Takes Over, Never Gonna Stop and The Promise

== Personal life ==
She married pastor and leader of soul61, Andy Croft, in 2009. Together they have 4 sons: Josiah David Croft, born 2015, Judah Croft, born 2016, Caleb Croft, born 2017 and Zachery Croft, born 2019.

== Discography ==
Solo albums

- Rule in My Heart (27 July 2014, Integrity Music/Survivor)

As featured artist

- Standing On The Edge(2018 Soul Survivor)
- The Promise (2017 Soul Survivor)
- Never Gonna Stop (11 November 2016, Soul Survivor)
- Love Takes Over (15 November 2015, Soul Survivor)
- The Flood (17 November 2013, Soul Survivor)
- Soul Survivor: 20th Anniversary Collection (14 July 2013, Soul Survivor)
- Kingdom Come (20 November 2012, Soul Survivor)
- We Are The Free (13 November 2011, Soul Survivor)
- Light The Sky (14 November 2010, Soul Survivor)
- Be My Everything: Best of Soul Survivor Live (2005–2009) (18 July 2010, Soul Survivor)
- Not Ashamed (29 November 2009, Soul Survivor)
- Complete – Live Worship From Soul Survivor 2008 (15 December 2008, Soul Survivor)
- Living For your Glory (3 March 2008, Soul Survivor)
