= When Silence Falls =

Studio album by Tim Hughes
- Released: 2004
- Studios: Bridge Street Studios and Sound Kitchen (Franklin, Tennessee); Ocean Way Recording (Nashville, Tennessee)
- Genre: Worship
- Length: 51:27
- Label: Survivor Records
- Producer: Nathan Nockels

Tim Hughes chronology
| Here I Am to Worship (2001) | When Silence Falls (2004) | Holding Nothing Back (2007) |

Professional ratings
Review scores
| Source | Rating |
|---|---|
| The Wichita Eagle | 4/5 stars |

When Silence Falls is the second Christian music album by Tim Hughes.

== Track listing ==
All songs written by Tim Hughes.

1. "Beautiful One" - 3:56
2. "You" - 4:44
3. "Consuming Fire" - 5:15
4. "Giver of Life" - 4:35
5. "Whole World in His Hands" - 3:49
6. "Beauty of Your Peace" - 5:06
7. "Name Above All Names" - 4:38
8. "When the Tears Fall" - 4:48
9. "Nothing in This World" - 4:13
10. "Joy Is in This Place" - 3:08
11. "Holy, Holy" - 5:28
12. "Beautiful One" (reprise) - 1:47

== Personnel ==
- Tim Hughes – vocals, acoustic guitars
- Nathan Nockels – acoustic piano, keyboards, acoustic guitars, backing vocals
- Gary Burnette – electric guitars
- Pat Malone – bass
- Trent Austin – drums
- Ken Lewis – percussion
- Christy Nockels – additional vocals (3, 11)

=== Production ===
- Les Moir – executive producer
- Mike Pilavachi – executive producer
- Nathan Nockels – producer
- Billy Whittington – recording (1, 3, 7–10)
- Joe Baldridge – recording (2, 4–6, 11)
- Julie Brakey – recording assistant (1, 3, 7–10)
- Joe Costa – recording assistant (2, 4–6, 11)
- Sam Gibson – mixing
- Adam Deane – mix assistant
- Chris Blair – mastering at Abbey Road Studios (London, UK)
- Marcus Melton – art direction, design
- Jimmy Abegg – photography
