= Souled Out (disambiguation) =

Souled Out was a professional wrestling pay-per-view promoted by World Championship Wrestling.

Souled Out may also refer to:

- Souled Out (Aberdeen), a non-denominational Christian organisation based in Aberdeen, Scotland
- Souled Out (Hezekiah Walker album), 2008
- Souled Out (Jhené Aiko album), 2014
- Souled Out (Tower of Power album), 1995
- "Souled Out (song)", by California group Supreme Love Gods (1992)
- "Souled Out!!!", a song by Conor Oberst on his self-titled album (2008)
- Soulboy (film), a British coming-of-age film with the working title Souled Out (2010)
- Souled Out, a 2019 album by Blacklite District
- Souled Out, a 1993 album by Panjabi MC
