= Here I Am to Worship (song) =

Song by Tim Hughes

from the album Here I Am to Worship
- Language: English
- Released: 24 December 2001
- Genre: Contemporary worship music
- Length: 5:15
- Label: EMI Gospel
- Songwriter: Tim Hughes

"Here I Am to Worship" is a song written by Tim Hughes and was released as the title song of his debut album Here I Am to Worship. The song is a popular worship ballad. It is commonly sung at Christian churches, festivals and youth gatherings. The song was ranked No. 1 on the Christian Copyright Licensing International (CCLI) two years in a row and was still ranked on their Top 25 Songs list in 2016.

== Writing and inspiration ==
Hughes wrote the song in 1999 as a response to how he felt after reading Philippians 2. The passage speaks about Christ's humility and how He willingly left His throne in heaven, came to earth as a man, and sacrificed Himself on the cross all because of His love for us. With this passage in mind, he picked up his guitar and, as he sang, the words to the song flowed out, but he was not satisfied with the chorus and felt that it did not flow well with the song. For several months, he struggled with the chorus and even put the song aside for about six months before finally finishing it. However, he was still not confident in the chorus. It was not until he played this song at his home church Soul Survivor, and his pastor told him to play the song more often, that he realized the potential the song had. Since then, this song has spread and become widely known. Hughes himself said. "No one has been more surprised than myself at seeing how God has used this worship song." The themes in the song are the life of Jesus, thankfulness, and worship.

== Composition ==
"Here I Am to Worship" is a slow worship ballad with a length of five minutes and fifteen seconds. The song is set in common time and has a tempo of 75 beats per minute. It is written in the key E Major. The verses follow the chord progression E - B - F♯m - A - E - B - A, the chorus follows the progression E - B - C♯m - A, and the bridge follows the progression B - E - A.

== Versions ==
It has been covered by other contemporary worship musicians, including:

- Michael W. Smith (Worship Again, 2002)
- Chris Tomlin (Passion: Our Love is Loud, 2002)
- Michael Gungor (Bigger Than My Imagination, 2003)
- Hillsong (Hope, 2003) recorded in a medley with "Call"
- Phillips, Craig and Dean (Let Your Glory Fall, 2003)
- Plus One (WOW Worship: Red, 2004 and Exodus, 2003)
- John Tesh (Worship Collection: Awesome God, 2003)
- Rebecca St. James (Live Worship: Blessed Be Your Name, 2004)
- Salvador (Worship Live, 2003)
- Sonicflood (Cry Holy, 2003)
- Jeremy Camp (Empty Me, Vol. 1, 2004)
- Israel & New Breed (Live from Another Level, 2004)
- Terry MacAlmon (The Sound of Heaven, 2004)
- Hillsong (Ultimate Worship, 2005)
- The O.C. Supertones (Faith of a Child, 2005)
- Randy Travis (Glory Train: Songs of Faith, Worship, and Praise, 2005)
- Lincoln Brewster (Let the Praises Ring, 2006)
- Lenny LeBlanc (Songs 4 Worship: Country, 2007)
- VeggieTales (Here I Am To Worship, 2009)
- Heather Headley (Audience of One, 2009)
