= Turners Hill =

Village and parish in West Sussex, England

Coordinates: 51.10368°N 0.08519°W

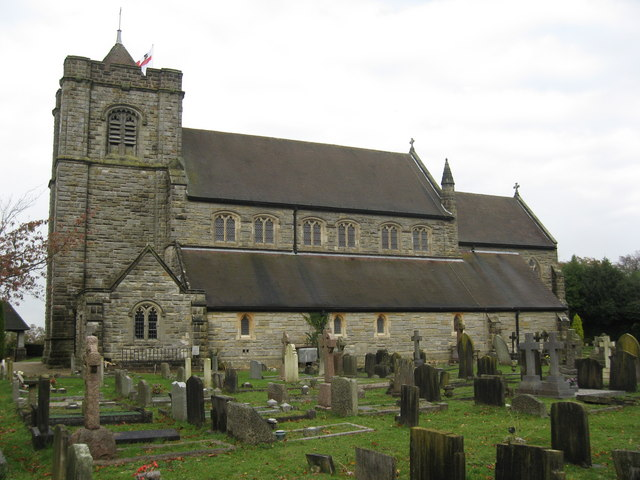
- St Leonard's Church

- Location within West Sussex
- Area: 13.90 km^{2} (5.37 sq mi)
- Population: 1,849 2001 Census; 1,919 (Census 2011)
  - Density: 133/km^{2} (340/sq mi)
- OS grid reference: TQ341355
  - London: 27 miles (43 km) N
- Civil parish: Turners Hill
- District: Mid Sussex
- Shire county: West Sussex
- Region: South East
- Country: England
- Sovereign state: United Kingdom
- Post town: CRAWLEY
- Postcode district: RH10
- Dialling code: 01342
- Police: Sussex
- Fire: West Sussex
- Ambulance: South East Coast
- UK Parliament: East Grinstead & Uckfield

Turners Hill is a village and civil parish in the Mid Sussex District of West Sussex, England. The civil parish covers an area of 1,390 hectares (3,400 acres), and has a population of 1,849 (2001 census) increasing to 1,919 at the 2011 Census.

The village is located three miles (5 km) south-west of East Grinstead, four miles (6 km) to the south-east of Crawley, and stands on a steep ridge line at one of the highest points (580 feet above sea level) of the High Weald, where two historically important routes, the B2110 and B2028, cross.

== The village ==
In the centre is the village green which, together with the shops, the Crown pub and the Free Church, form the focal point. St Leonard's Anglican church is on a ridge of the hill. St Leonard's was built in 1895–7 by Lacy Ridge, with porches and the rock-faced tower added by Sir Aston Webb in 1923. The stained glass windows are all by Charles Eamer Kempe. The reredos seems to be a composite of salvaged pieces from different sources. The Free Church building dates from 1906 and replaced a church on the same site formed in 1824 by members of Zion Chapel in East Grinstead and the Countess of Huntingdon's Connexion.

The village has two pubs, the Crown and the Red Lion. Facilities for football, netball, five-a-side and tennis are available on the large recreation ground while the cricket club now has its own ground. There is a Victorian primary school, Turners Hill Church of England primary school, which has recently been extended, and has a wind turbine. Pupils usually move to Imberhorne School after year six. A community centre, The Ark, and parish council facilities involving a village housing scheme has been built adjacent to the recreation ground.

The area to the north of the cross-roads represents the major residential development in recent years while the older parts of the village, and in particular Lion Lane, have retained their historic character. Many buildings date from the 17th and 18th centuries and a number have been listed by the Department of the Environment. The village centre with its pubs and churches has been designated a conservation area.

== Sport ==
Football is a very popular sport in the village. There are two football teams, Turners Hill and Turners Hill reserves. Football is often played at the recreation ground (always called "the rec or the ark" by villagers) for fun as well as by all three teams. There is a traditional rivalry with the nearest village Crawley Down. The rec also holds events such as the annual village fair.

Turners Hill Cricket Club (nicknamed the "Tigers") plays competitive cricket as an affiliated member of the Sussex Cricket League. The club currently has one adult Saturday team that plays in Division 7 Central, and a T20 team that competes in the Sussex Slam tournament. Turners Hill Tigers are the reigning 2024 Men's Sussex Slam Shield champions. The club relocated from the Ark to Turners Hill Road in the early-1990s, opposite Tulleys Farm pumpkin fields.

The village is known as one of the hardest sections of the London to Brighton bike ride, perhaps second only to Ditchling Beacon, and every year causes severe congestion.

== Landmarks ==
Within the parish, there is a Site of Special Scientific Interest also called Turners Hill. This is a disused quarry whose workings have left vertical sections in the sandstone making it a valuable resource for paeleoenvironmental research.

Worth Abbey and Worth School are situated near the village.

== Notable residents ==
Antiques appraiser David Battie, who is an expert on Antiques Roadshow and previously at Sotheby's.

Olympic athlete Daley Thompson lived in the village for a short time.

Jimmy Page, former guitarist for Led Zeppelin, owns a house near the village.

Phatfish singer Lou Fellingham grew up in the village and attended the Free Church.

Olympic athlete (4th 1984 Olympic 5,000m) and TV Commentator Tim Hutchings was brought up in the cottage next to the White Hart Inn, 1.5 miles to the south of the village. He attended Worth School.

== Twin towns ==
In 1992 Turners Hill entered into a Town Twinning relationship with St Leger en Yvelines in the Île-de-France region of France. The active Turners Hill Twinning Association meets at monthly social events and has an annual exchange visit with the residents of St Leger, each town visiting the other on a bi-annual rotation.
