= Rainmaker (YFriday album) =

Studio album by YFriday
- Released: 1999
- Genre: Rock, Christian Rock
- Length: 46:16
- Label: Survivor Records
- Producer: Neil Costello

YFriday chronology
Rainmaker (1999)	Open (2001)

Rainmaker is YFriday's debut album. Released in 1999 before the band went full-time the album contains the well known track "Holy, Holy, Holy".

== Track listing ==
1. Shine (4:07)
2. Holy, Holy, Holy (3:55)
3. Closer (4:37)
4. Part of Me (4:44)
5. Thank You for the Cross (4:42)
6. Rainmaker (2:11)
7. All over the World (4:08)
8. Greatest (4:19)
9. If (4:24)
10. Calling Out (3:21)
11. Here (5:54)

== Personnel ==
- Ken Riley - vocals and guitars
- Gav Richards - keyboards, guitars & backing vocals
- Ben Culkin - bass guitar
- Dez Minto - drums
