= Revolution (YFriday album) =

Studio album by YFriday
- Released: 2003
- Recorded: Blue Sky Studios, Derby
- Genre: Rock, Christian Rock
- Length: 35:29
- Label: Survivor Records
- Producer: Neil Costello

YFriday chronology
Open (2001)	Revolution (2003)	Universal (2006)

Revolution is an album by the Christian rock band YFriday. Released in 2003, Revolution is the band's third studio album.

== Track listing ==
1. Rise – 3:19
2. Someone I Can Live For – 2:34
3. Revolution – 3:22
4. Hands Up – 4:10
5. 13 – 3:48
6. Saved the Day – 3:01
7. Lift – 4:03
8. Start of the Summer – 3:33
9. Shine2 – 3:32
10. Lament – 4:07

All music and lyrics by Ken Riley.

== Personnel ==
- Ken Riley - vocals and guitars
- Gav Richards - keyboards and backing vocals
- Danny Smith - bass
- Dez Minto - drums
- Michelle John - backing vocals
- Tracey Riggan - backing vocals
- Carla Hayes - backing vocals

== Reception ==
Professional ratings
Review scores
Source	Rating
Cross Rhythms	link

The album was reviewed in issue 77 of the Cross Rhythms Magazine; the review was favourable, describing the album as "simply excellent" and its sound as "an organic, stripped down rock sound".
