= Open (YFriday album) =

Studio album by YFriday
- Released: 2001
- Genre: Rock, Christian Rock
- Length: 42:06
- Label: Survivor Records
- Producer: Neil Costello

YFriday chronology
Rainmaker (1999)	Open (2001)	Revolution (2003)

Open is the second studio album from the Christian band yFriday. Released in 2001 the CD also contains Head Over Heels which was released as the band's only single.

== Track listing ==
1. Creator (4:18)
2. At the Cross (3:51)
3. Glory (4:10)
4. Head Over Heels (3:44)
5. I Love You (3:12)
6. Rain (5:01)
7. Praise (4:22)
8. Carry Me (4:38)
9. Joy (3:44)
10. Shelter (5:12)

== Head Over Heels ==
Head over Heels was released as a single on the Survivor Record label. In contained two tracks, Head over Heels and a remix of the track Closer, taken from their first album Rainmaker. Also on the CD was a music video for Head over Heels.

== Personnel ==
- Ken Riley - Vocals & Guitars
- Gav Richards - Keyboards, Guitars & Backing Vocals
- Danny Smith - Bass & Backing Vocals
- Dez Minto - Drums
