= The Universal Broadcast =

Live album by YFriday
- Released: 10 March 2008
- Recorded: 27 October 2007
- Genre: Rock, Christian Rock
- Length: 1:09:09
- Label: Survivor Records
- Producer: Adrian Thompson & Les Moir

YFriday chronology
Universal (2006)	The Universal Broadcast (2008)

The Universal Broadcast is the first live CD and DVD from the Newcastle-based English Christian Rock band YFriday. Released in March 2008, it features songs from most of the band's albums and one song not yet recorded in the studio (How Can We Dance?) and a bonus 'Behind The Scenes' DVD feature.

Published on the 'Survivor Music' label, the CD and DVD were recorded at the same concert. Over 1,300 fans came to the Riverside Centre in Derby on 27 October 2007 where the recording was made.

The album was rated an 8 out of 10 by Cross Rhythms.

== Track listing ==
1. Intro (2001: A Space Odyssey - Sprach Zarathustra) (1:49)
2. Universal (3:38)
3. Someone I Can Live For (3:07)
4. Wonderful (3:41)
5. I'm Yours (5:19)
6. Hands Up (4:28)
7. Holy Holy Holy (4:01)
8. How Can We Dance? (5:33)
9. Shine2 (3:33)
10. Rise (3:22)
11. Start of the Summer/Rain (6:25)
12. Gravity (6:34)
13. Everlasting God (7:30)
14. One Hope (4:26)
15. Revolution (5:49)

== Personnel ==
- Ken Riley - Vocals & Guitars
- Gav Richards - Keyboards, Guitars & Backing Vocals
- Danny Smith - Bass & Backing Vocals
- Dez Minto - Drums
- Subrina McCalla - Additional Vocals in Hands Up
- Crystal Jones - Additional Vocals in Hands Up
