= Rule in My Heart =

Studio album by Beth Croft
- Released: 27 July 2014
- Genre: CCM, alternative rock, worship, britpop, synthpop
- Length: 47:15
- Label: Integrity, Survivor

Rule in My Heart is the first studio album by Beth Croft. Integrity Music alongside Survivor Records released the album on 27 July 2014.

== Critical reception ==
Professional ratings
Review scores
Source	Rating
365 Days of Inspiring Media	4/5 stars
Cross Rhythms	8/10 squares
Louder Than the Music	4/5 stars
Worship Leader	4/5 stars

Awarding the album four stars from Worship Leader, Jeremy Armstrong describes, "heavily Brit-pop tones and synthy washes of sound surrounding solid lyric writing centered on worship designed with a youthy vibe." Stephen Curry, rating the album an eight out of ten at Cross Rhythms, writes, "a good set from a songwriter who is emerging as an artist in her own right." Giving the album four stars for Louder Than the Music, Jono Davies states, "There is so much to like about this album as a piece of musical art." Jonathan Andre, indicating in a four star review by 365 Days of Inspiring Media, says the album has, "such honesty, vulnerability and encouragement".

== Awards and accolades ==
This album was No. 16 on the Worship Leader's Top 20 Albums of 2014 list.

The song, "Say the Word", was No. 19 on the Worship Leader's Top 20 Songs of 2014 list.

== Track listing ==
Track listing
No.	Title	Length
1.	"Love Takes Over"	3:58
2.	"Say the Word"	5:07
3.	"Rule in My Heart"	5:12
4.	"Boldly I Approach (The Art of Celebration)"	5:28
5.	"Arms of Grace"	4:25
6.	"Purify"	5:53
7.	"Hold On"	3:31
8.	"Make the World Dance"	4:07
9.	"Kingdom Come (live)"	5:30
10.	"Lectio Davina"	4:04
Total length:		47:15
