= Love Shine Through =

Studio album by Tim Hughes
- Released: 20 March 2011
- Studio: Chapel Lane Studios (Hereford, UK); Street Studios (Rustington, UK); White Horse Studios (Portland, Oregon, USA); Berwick Lane (Atlanta, Georgia, USA)
- Genre: CCM, worship
- Length: 63:52
- Label: Kingsway
- Producer: Martin Smith

Tim Hughes chronology
Happy Day (2009)	Love Shine Through (2011)	Pocketful of Faith (2015)

Love Shine Through is the fourth studio album by British worship leader Tim Hughes. It was released in March 2011

== Track listing ==
Standard edition
No.	Title	Writer(s)	Length
1.	"Counting On Your Name"	Tim Hughes, Nick Herbert & Ben Cantelon	05:33
2.	"God Is Coming"	Tim Hughes & Martin Smith	05:48
3.	"Never Stop Singing"	Tim Hughes, Paul Evans, Martin Smith, Ben Cantelon & Jon Dean	04:49
4.	"Saviour's Song"	Tim Hughes, Kees Kraayenoord & Martin Smith	05:17
5.	"All Glory"	Nikki Fletcher, Tim Hughes & Martin Smith	04:51
6.	"At Your Name (Forever)"	Tim Hughes & Phil Wickham (also Martin Smith)	06:38
7.	"Jesus Saves"	Tim Hughes & Nick Herbert	04:00
8.	"Love Shine Through"	Tim Hughes & Martin Smith	05:32
9.	"Keep The Faith"	Martin Smith, Nick Herbert & Tim Hughes	06:36
10.	"Wake Up"	Stu G, Tim Hughes & Martin Smith	05:06
11.	"Ecclesiastes"	Martin Smith & Tim Hughes	04:42
12.	"At Your Name"	Tim Hughes & Phil Wickham	05:00
Total length:			63:52

== Personnel ==
- Tim Hughes – vocals, lead guitar, acoustic guitars
- Josiah Sherman – keyboards, programming
- Ben Cantelon – additional keyboards
- Martin Smith – keyboards, acoustic guitars, guest vocals (1)
- Nathan Nockels – keyboards, programming, electric guitars, backing vocals
- Daniel Carson – electric guitars
- Michael Guy Chislett – electric guitars
- Marc James – slide guitar, pedal steel guitar, guest vocals (2)
- Mark Prentice – bass (1–11)
- Pat Malone – bass (12)
- Jerry Brown – drums (1–11), percussion (1–11)
- Ashley Appling – drums (12)
- Jamie Dalton – brass
- Rick Swann – brass
- Gerald La Feuvre – cello
- Omotoye Makinde (Mo. Tru) – conductor
- David Grant – backing vocals, guest vocals (11)
- Tony Momrelle – backing vocals
- Fay Simpson – backing vocals, guest vocals (5)
- Kate Woodrow – backing vocals
- Kim Walker-Smith – guest vocals (4)
- Rend Collective – men's crowd singing
- Jesus House Choir – choir

=== Production ===
- Les Moir – executive producer
- Martin Smith – producer
- Sam Gibson – recording (1–11), mixing
- Jim Dineen – recording (12)
- Nathan Nockels – recording (12)
- Trevor Michael – additional engineer (1–11)
- Jared Rogers – additional engineer (12)
- Luke Collins – additional editing
- Geoff Pesche – mastering at Abbey Road Studios (London, UK)
- Mark Debnam – creative director, design
- Soulla Petrou – photography
