= Guaranteed (Phatfish album) =

Studio album by Phatfish
- Released: (United Kingdom) (United States) 1 July 2007
- Genre: CCM; Worship; Christian rock
- Length: 40:38
- Producer: Kevan Frost and Nathan Fellingham

Phatfish chronology
There Is A Day - The Video Collection (2006)	Guaranteed (2007)	15 (2008)

Professional ratings
Review scores
Source	Rating
Cross Rhythms	(10/10)
Christianity Today	4/5 stars
The Jono Show	5/5 stars

Guaranteed is the 2007 studio album from Phatfish. It features the vocals of Lou Fellingham, and consists of 10 new tracks written by various members of the band. Phatfish worked with Kevan Frost on the album, who produced their 2001 release Heavenbound.

The album received a positive response, with Cross Rhythms website giving it 10/10 in its review and the album peaking at number 4 on the monthly sales charts. The tracks "Amazing God", written by Nathan Fellingham and Paul Oakley, and "Best Thing" were chosen for radio airplay with the latter reaching Number 1 and staying there for 9 weeks. The track was the 13th most played song of the year for Cross Rhythm's Radio for 2007.

American website Christianity Today gave the album 4/5 stars, with various other critics, Christian music reviewers and online shops rating the album well. The album was chosen as CD of the month in August 2007 for Wesley Owen, an online website and chain of Christian shops based in the UK. It also reached top of the contemporary charts for the website.

The track "Amazing God" was chosen as Kingsway Song's song of the month for July 2007, offering sheet music and an audio download of Nathan Fellingham describing the song for free. "Amazing God" was also offered as a download for Phatfish newsletter subscribers before the release of the album, along with the band's website receiving a new colour scheme and entrance page to coincide with the release of Guaranteed.

In late 2007 Lou Fellingham, Nathan Fellingham and Michael Sandeman made a TV appearance on Premier TV, talking about Guaranteed and other topics.

== Live ==
To follow-up the release of the album Phatfish did not embark on an official Guaranteed Tour, rather opted to play one-off concerts titled Phatfish and Lou Fellingham.

Two songs from the album, "Pouring Out" and "Amazing God" have started to appear on live worship albums and were sung at the Newday, Together On A Mission and Mission:Worship conferences in 2007, which Phatfish attended.

The song "Amazing God" has grown in popularity. As well as being the title song for the 2007 Newfrontiers live album "Amazing God" (sung by Kate Simmonds), it was covered by American worship leader Kelly Minter on her studio album last year. A Phatfish version featured on the 2008 Mission:Worship live album, which was recorded late 2007, titled "A New Day Of Worship". In addition, a newer version features on the upcoming Newday Live 2008 album titled "This Is Life", played by Phatfish & Lou Fellingham. The most recent rendition of "Amazing God" can be found on the 2008 live album from the Keswick Convention, titled Keswick Live. The track is played by Phatfish, lead singer Lou Fellingham with Stuart Townend on guitar.

The song "From The Rising Of The Sun" featured on the 2008 Newfrontiers live worship release Salvation's Song, played by Phatfish. They were leading worship at the conference Together On A Mission when it was recorded.

== Track listing ==
1. "Pouring Out"
2. "I Am Yours"
3. "Amazing God"
4. "Best Thing"
5. "Who Else Could I Run To?"
6. "Holy Spirit"
7. "This Year"
8. "Rise Up"
9. "Come And Behold"
10. "From The Rising Of The Sun"

== Personnel ==
- Lou Fellingham - vocals
- Nathan Fellingham - drums, percussion, backing vocals
- Michael Sandeman - keyboards, synthesizer, Hammond organ
- Luke Fellingham - bass
- Kevan Frost - electric guitars, acoustic guitars, backing vocals
- Alan Rose - additional guitars
