= Universal (YFriday album) =

Studio album by YFriday
- Released: 2006
- Genre: Rock, Christian Rock
- Label: Survivor Records
- Producer: Nathan Dantzler

YFriday chronology
Revolution (2003)	Universal (2006)	The Universal Broadcast (2008)

Universal was YFriday's fourth album. It was released on 31 March 2006 at Youth for Christ's IXth Hour event in Newcastle.

The album was rated a 9 out of 10 by Cross Rhythms.

== Track listing ==
1. "Universal" – 3:32 (Ken Riley)
2. "I'm Yours" – 4:23 (Ken Riley)
3. "Wonderful" – 3:35 (Ken Riley)
4. "Lullaby" – 4:33 (Ken Riley)
5. "Calling" – 4:09 (Ken Riley)
6. "Gravity" – 5:23 (Ken Riley)
7. "Shadow of the Cross" – 4:14 (Ken Riley)
8. "Everlasting God" – 4:32 (Brenton Brown/Ken Riley)
9. "One Hope" – 3:31 (Ken Riley)
10. "Yahweh" – 3:55 (Ken Riley)
11. "Hallelujah" – 4:10 (Ken Riley)

== Personnel ==
- Ken Riley - vocals and guitars
- Gav Richards - keyboards and backing vocals
- Danny Smith - bass and backing vocals
- Dez Minto - drums
