= Pocketful of Faith =

Studio album by Tim Hughes
- Released: 17 July 2015
- Genres: CCM, worship
- Length: 57:59
- Label: Integrity
- Producers: Nathan Nockels: Jacob Attwooll; Josh Record

Tim Hughes chronology
Love Shine Through (2011)	Pocketful of Faith (2015)

Pocketful of Faith is the fifth studio album by Tim Hughes. Integrity Music released the album on 17 July 2015.

== Critical reception ==
Professional ratings
Review scores
Source	Rating
365 Days of Inspiring Media	4.5/5 stars
CCM Magazine	4/5 stars
Christian Music Review	4.5/5
Cross Rhythms	9/10 squares
Louder Than the Music	4.5/5 stars
New Release Today	4/5 stars
The Phantom Tollbooth	3/5
Worship Leader	4.5/5 stars

Jamie Walker, rating the album four stars for CCM Magazine, states, "Tim Hughes, one of the most prolific songwriters and artists in contemporary worship music delivers another stand-out album with Pocketful of Faith'." Giving the album a nine out of ten from Cross Rhythms, Paul Ewbank writes, "Vocally, Hughes is on top form and the production is excellent throughout...[where] he hasn't sounded this fresh and exciting in a long time." Jeremy Armstrong, indicating in a four and a half star review by Worship Leader, replies, "And in classic Hughes form, the prayers are artful, musically excellent, and vulnerable with an ability to catch our hearts along with them." Rating the album four stars from New Release Today, Jonathan Brassington says, "Each song holds its own by way of honest lyrics and natural vocals."

Awarding the album four and a half stars at 365 Days of Inspiring Media, Jonathan Andre describes, "It is in spite of the long wait between albums where he has mined and dug and now uncovered 13 quality tracks- songs that are well worth the wait." Jono Davies, giving the album four and a half stars from Louder Than the Music, writes, "Tim, as always, has produced a top quality album." Rating the album a 4.5 out of five for Christian Music Review, Kelly Meade states, "As you listen to Pocketful Of Faith start to finish, you hear how each song fits together telling a story of trust, faith and putting them into motion, moving towards the purpose God has for your life." Derek Walker, signaling in a three out of five reviews at The Phantom Tollbooth, says, "No one's expecting any surprises from Hughes and he gives a solid, if predictable, set of songs that focus on faith and obedience."

== Awards and accolades ==
This album was No. 4, on the Worship Leader's Top 20 Albums of 2015 list.

The song, "Hope and Glory", was No. 3, on the Worship Leader's Top 20 Songs of 2015 list.

== Track listing ==
Standard edition
No.	Title	Writer(s)	Length
1.	"Here with Me"	Tim Hughes, Reuben Morgan, Jamie Snell	5:34
2.	"Only the Brave"	Hughes, Nick Herbert, Martin Smith	3:15
3.	"Pocketful of Faith"	Hughes, Herbert, Ben Cantelon, Phil Wickham	6:07
4.	"Symphony"	Hughes, Morgan, Snell	4:18
5.	"Set Apart"	Cantelon, Hughes, Herbert, Luke Hellebronth	4:14
6.	"Plans"	Hughes, Herbert	2:53
7.	"Arms"	Hughes, Herbert, Smith, Jonas Myrin	4:58
8.	"Sky High"	Hughes, Hellebronth, Myrin, Jason Ingram, Matt Redman	5:58
9.	"The Cross Stands"	Cantelon, Hughes, Herbert, Redman	3:36
10.	"The Way"	Cantelon, Hughes, Herbert	4:30
11.	"Hope and Glory"	Hughes, Herbert, Smith	4:02
12.	"Hallelujah (Friend and King)"	Hughes, Jacob Attwooll, Josh Record	4:34
13.	"The Way" (acoustic) (bonus track)	Cantelon, Hughes, Herbert	4:00
Total length:			57:59

== Charts ==
Chart (2015)	Peak position
UK Albums (Official Charts)	98
