= Here I Am to Worship =

Studio album by Tim Hughes
- Released: 24 December 2001
- Studios: Soul Survivor (Watford, UK); Earful Sound (Brentwood, Tennessee); The Refuge and Paragon Studios (Franklin, Tennessee); The Junction (Pasadena, California)
- Genre: Contemporary Christian music
- Length: 47:25
- Label: Worship Together
- Producers: Jason Halbert; Dwayne Larring

Tim Hughes chronology
Here I Am to Worship (2001)	When Silence Falls (2004)

Professional ratings
Review scores
Source	Rating
Cross Rhythms	10/10

Here I Am to Worship is an album of Christian music by singer-songwriter Tim Hughes.

== Track listing ==
All songs written by Tim Hughes, except where noted.

No.	Title	Writer(s)	Length
1.	"Maker of All Things"		3:49
2.	"May the Words of My Mouth"	Tim Hughes, Rob Hill	4:14
3.	"Here I Am to Worship"		5:15
4.	"I'll Always Love You"		5:33
5.	"If There's One Thing"		4:38
6.	"Redeemer"		3:12
7.	"Day After Day"		3:52
8.	"Jesus, You Alone"		3:51
9.	"Never Lose the Wonder"		4:52
10.	"The Eyes of My Heart"	Matt Redman	4:26
11.	"My Jesus, My Lifeline"		3:43

== Personnel ==
- Tim Hughes – lead vocals, backing vocals, additional guitars
- Jason Halbert – keyboards, organ, programming
- Carl Marsh – additional string programming
- George Cocchini – acoustic guitars
- Dwayne Larring – acoustic guitars, electric guitars
- David Larring – additional guitars, bass
- Otto Price – bass
- Rick May – drums
- John Catchings – cello
- Monisa Angell – viola
- David Angell – second violin
- David Davidson – first violin, string arrangements

== Production ==
- Les Moir – executive producer
- Mike Pilavachi – executive producer
- Jason Halbert – producer, engineer, mixing (3)
- Dwayne Larring – producer, additional engineer
- Jim McCaslin – additional engineer
- Fred Paragano – mixing (1, 2, 4–11)
- Ken Love – mastering at MasterMix (Nashville, Tennessee)
- Christiév Carothers – creative direction
- Jan Cook – art direction
- Benji Peck – design
- Kristin Barlowe – photography
