= YFriday =

British Christian rock and worship band

Background information
- Origin: Newcastle upon Tyne, England
- Genre: Christian rock
- Years active: 1994–2010
- Label: Survivor Records
- Members: Ken Riley; Gav Richards; Danny Smith; Dez Minto

YFriday were a British Christian rock and worship band from Newcastle upon Tyne. From their beginning in 1994 until they split in 2010, they gained popularity amongst Christian music fans around the world, particularly in the United Kingdom. In 2010, YFriday announced that they were commencing their final months before disbanding later in the same year, after releasing a number of successful albums.

== History ==
The group was formed in 1994, originally as the house band for a monthly evangelistic outreach event run by Youth for Christ called WhyFriday?. The WhyFriday? outreach programme initially had a regular attendance of about 50–60 young people, but this steadily grew and the event, later called IXth Hour, was held at the Newcastle City Hall for a number of years. At its peak, IXth Hour had around 800 attendees each month and the band still performed there regularly until their split.

Following the 1999 release of the Rainmaker album, the band were approached by Kingsway with an offer of a 3-year recording contract. Bassist Danny Smith joined the band in 2001, in time for the Open album. It was at this time that the band members made the decision to leave their jobs to work together full-time. They also released an EP in 2003.

From 2007 until 2010, the band supported the event Chesterfest, playing a number of gigs and performing at their "Funday on a Sunday". In February 2010, YFriday also performed alongside the worship team from Abundant Life Church, Blush and Kev Whitmore at the "Heart for Haiti" concert supporting the NXT ministries projects in Port-au-Prince after the January 2010 earthquake.

The band played at the first Big Church Day out in 2009.

YFriday played their final concert as a band in a sold out Newcastle City Hall on 31 October 2010.

== Members ==
Band membership has changed slightly since the original formation.

=== Ken Riley ===
Riley was the lead singer and guitarist of YFriday. He is a prolific songwriter and has collaborated with a number of other Christian songwriters including Matt Redman, Martin Smith (Delirious?) and Tim Hughes. His most globally recognised song "Everlasting God", co-written with Brenton Brown, received an ASCAP Award in 2008 and was nominated for a Dove Award.

He co-produced the YFriday album, Great and Glorious, with Sam Gibson (Crowded House, Hillsong United) and, in 2010, produced the album Supreme for the band The Steels, following their signing to Kingsway/EMI.

Riley is married to Amanda and has three children. After leaving the band he was appointed Director of Worship at City Church Newcastle and, in 2013, released his first solo EP, Wondrous Things.

=== Dez Minto ===
Minto, the band's drummer, also founded Broadwater Studios, a recording studio in Gateshead, and Minto Music, an audio-visual and lighting hire company with bases in Gateshead and Exeter. He is married to Rachael and is a father of two. After the band split, the family relocated to Devon where he is the Worship Leader at Rediscover Church (an Elim Pentecostal Church).

=== Danny Smith ===
Smith joined the band as bassist in 2001 as they signed their first professional record contract. A member of an Anglican church in South Tyneside, where he was part of the worship band and helped with the youth work, Smith also taught guitar. As of 2023, Smith is serving a five year prison sentence for sexual offences against a minor, which took place while he was working as a church music director.

=== Gav Richards ===
Keyboards and second guitar player and backing vocalist, Richards was born and grew up in Hartlepool. He is part of the worship and production teams at the gate church in prudehoe. After the band split, he worked as a sound engineer and producer for Broadwater Studios. He is now married.

== Discography ==
=== Albums ===
- Rainmaker (June 1999)
- Open (2001)
- Revolution (September 2003)
- Universal (April 2006)
- The Universal Broadcast (March 2008)
- Great & Glorious (April 2009)
- Everlasting God: The Best of yFriday (August 2010)

=== EP ===
- Why Friday? (199?) – Very rare Audio Cassette Featuring 'Tear Down the Walls' among others.
- Songs of Heaven (2003)

== Gallery ==
Yfriday live in Motherwell

Yfriday live in Motherwell

Yfriday live in Motherwell
