= Mobilise =

- Founded: 2002
- Type: Christian students and twenties conference
- Owner: Newfrontiers
- Website: http://mobiliseuk.org/

Mobilise is a set of Christian conferences, weekend retreats and resources for students and twenties, run by the Newfrontiers family of churches in the UK.

== Mobilise Conference ==
The main Mobilise event is an annual conference, which has been attended by over 1,600 students and twenties. The four-day conference was held during the summer, often in July, at the Brighton Centre in Brighton, England, alongside the Together On A Mission conference for Christian leaders.

At the final Together On A Mission conference in July 2011, it was announced that the Mobilise conference would continue independently in the coming years. The 2012 conference was held at a Pontins holiday park in Prestatyn, Wales.

== Other Endeavours ==
=== Leaders' Weekends ===
Mobilise runs student and twenties workers' retreats.

=== Mobilise Worldwide ===
Mobilise also supports international missions, sending out two teams a year during the Easter and summer holidays.

=== Resources ===
Mobilise also provides support for Christians attending and graduating university.

== See also ==
- Newfrontiers
- Together On A Mission
- Newday
