= Turners Hill SSSI =

Protected area in West Sussex, England

Coordinates: 51.102°N 0.090°W

- Site of Special Scientific Interest
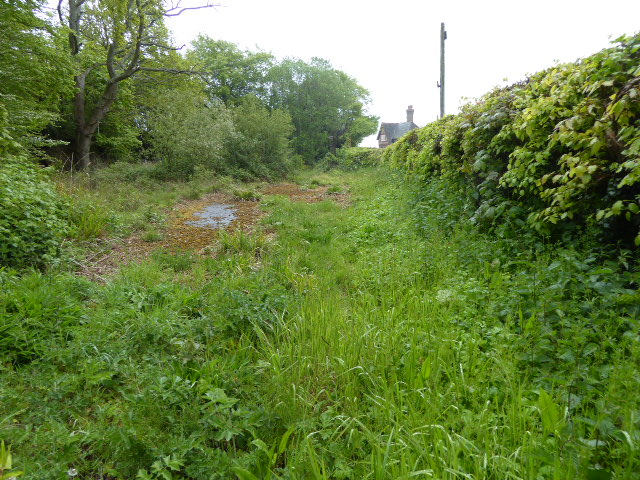
- Location of Turners Hill SSSI.
- Area of search: West Sussex
- Grid reference: TQ 338 354
- Interest: Geological
- Area: 0.2 hectares (0.49 acres)
- Notification date: 1999
- Location map: Magic Map

Turners Hill SSSI is a 0.2-hectare (0.49-acre) geological Site of Special Scientific Interest in Turners Hill in West Sussex. It is a Geological Conservation Review site.

This former quarry exposed the Tunbridge Wells Sand Formation, part of the Hastings Beds, which dates to the Early Cretaceous between about 140 and 100 million years ago. It provided excellent three dimensional sections through the Ardingly Sandstone Member of the Formation.

The site is private land with no public access. The quarry has been filled in and no geology is visible.
