= Soulla Petrou =

British photographer (born 1964)

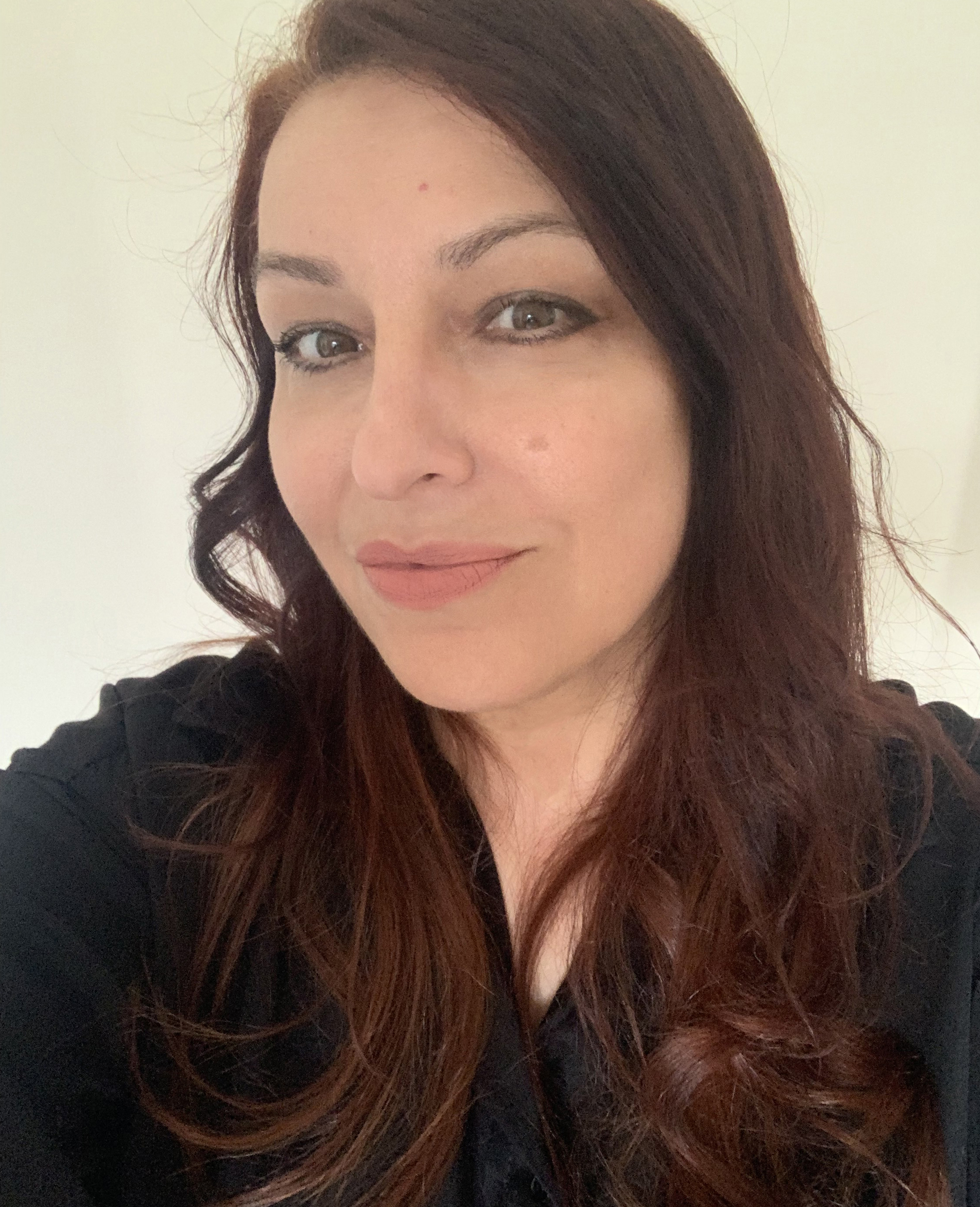
- Petrou in 2024
- Born: March 1964 (age 62); Leeds,United Kingdom
- Occupation: Photographer
- Years active: since 1994
- Website: https://www.soullapetrou.com

Soulla Petrou (born 1964) is a British photographer based in London whose work focuses on music, portraiture, fashion and beauty..Born in Leeds to Greek Cypriot parents, she studied Fashion at Middlesex University before taking photography night classes at St Martin’s School of Art

== Career ==
Petrou is known for documenting music and club culture including drum and bass club nights and photographing a wide range of musicians such as Goldie, Blur, Fatboy Slim, Orbital, Underworld and General Levy from the mid-1990s onwards. Her work has been published in national media including The Face magazine, Mixmag, DJ magazine, The Saturday Times Her work is held in the permanent collection of the Victoria and Albert Museum, London. In 2007 Petrou photographed Frankie Knuckles, David Morales, Satoshi Tomiie, Hector Romero for the 20th anniversary of Def Mix Productions, the DJ agency and management company. Work includes album covers for various artists. ReBoot (Sam Brown album) , Love Shine Through

== Book ==
Petrou is the author of "Rewind-Journey of a Music Photographer" which chronicles her first 15 years of working as a music photographer from 1994 to 2009.(ISBN 9781739116606) The Foreword is written by the Guardian music critic Alexis Petridis.

== Exhibitions ==
Petrou has exhibited her work in both solo and group exhibitions in the UK and in Germany. In 2025 she exhibited "Rewind"as a solo exhibition at Photofusion Gallery in London which featured early images of Geri Halliwell 2 years prior to her Spice Girls fame, Damon Albarn, Supergrass alongside clubbing images from the Big Chill Festival and AWOL jungle night which revealed a newly discovered shot of Goldie amongst the crowd of clubbers and work from Defected Records during the Winter Music Conference in Miami. Some of her "Rewind" images were exhibited at Photo North Festival in Leeds in March 2026. Petrou's image of Mis-teeq features in "The Music is Black: A British Story" the inaugural exhibition at the V&A East in April 2026..

== Awards and Recognition ==
In 2025 Petrou's image of "Alex on Fairground Ride" from her series "Alex's Brighton Adventure" was selected for the Taylor Wessing Photo Portrait Prize and exhibited at the National Portrait Gallery, London with the exhibition touring to the Millennium Gallery in Sheffield. She has received various awards over the years, including British Institute of Professional Photographers (BIPP) National Awards for her image "Siren" in 2022. Her work was also recognised by the International Photography Awards in 2008 for her series on DJ duo "Copyright", shot originally for Defected Records, where she achieved 3rd place in the Music Category. In 2014 Petrou won Silver in the fashion category for her "Ted Baker" footwear campaign at the Prix de la Photographie and was the overall 3rd-place winner of the "People's Choice". In 2026 Petrou was a Photo-book winner at the Belfast Photo Festival.

== Collections ==
Petrou's image of Mis-Teeq, shot in 2003 for Popworld magazine was acquired in 2024 by the Victoria and Albert Museum, London, to be held in the permanent collection.
