= Tom Smith (Christian musician) =

- Born: 24 February 1988 (age 38); Littlehampton, West Sussex
- Origin: Watford, London, England
- Genres: Worship; CEDM; CCM; dubstep
- Occupations: Singer, songwriter, worship leader
- Instruments: vocals, singer-songwriter
- Years active: 2015–present
- Website: tomsmith.tv

Tom Smith (born 24 February 1988) is an English Christian musician and worship leader, who plays a Christian pop and EDM style of worship music. He released, Sound of Heaven, an extended play, in 2014.

== Early life and personal life ==
Tom Smith was born on 24 February 1988, in Littlehampton, West Sussex, and he resides in Watford, Hertfordshire, England, with his wife, Susi. He has a son named Sonny Smith who was born in May 2017.

== Music career ==
Smith's music recording career commenced in 2015, with the release, Sound of Heaven, an extended play, on 6 July 2015, independently. He is also showcased on the Soul Survivor albums, Love Takes Over, Never Gonna Stop, The Promise and Standing on the Edge

== Discography ==
EPs

- Sound of Heaven (6 July 2015)
- Everyday (27 July 2018)
