= Sound of Heaven =

EP by Tom Smith
- Released: 6 July 2015
- Genres: Worship; CEDM; CCM; dubstep
- Length: 22:28
- Producers: Martin Smith, Tom Smith

Sound of Heaven is the first extended play by English Christian musician Tom Smith. He released the EP on 6 July 2015. Smith worked with Martin Smith, in the production of this EP.

== Critical reception ==
Professional ratings
Review scores
Source	Rating
Louder Than the Music	5/5 stars
The Phantom Tollbooth	3.5/5 stars
Worship Leader	4/5 stars

Awarding the EP four stars at Worship Leader, Jeremy Armstrong writes, "Plenty of worship releases these days have semblances of EDM/dubstep. But is a semblance enough? Sound of Heaven says absolutely not." Derek Walker, rating the album three and a half out of five for The Phantom Tollbooth, states, "Worship music does have a future after all...This one shows the way with colour, energy and soaring production." Giving the album five stars from Louder Than the Music, describes, "Once you take away all the big sounds, the creative music, we are left with the most important aspect of any worship album, the lyrics...Tom hasn't just used the same old clichéd lyrics and the same old melodies with the same old bridge section, Tom has written honestly yet poetically and passionately."

== Track listing ==
No.	Title	Length
1.	"Dynamite"	4:29
2.	"Take My Heart"	3:42
3.	"Burn Bright"	3:21
4.	"Sound of Heaven"	5:23
5.	"End of Me"	5:33
Total length:		22:28
