= Tim Hughes =

The Reverend Tim Hughes
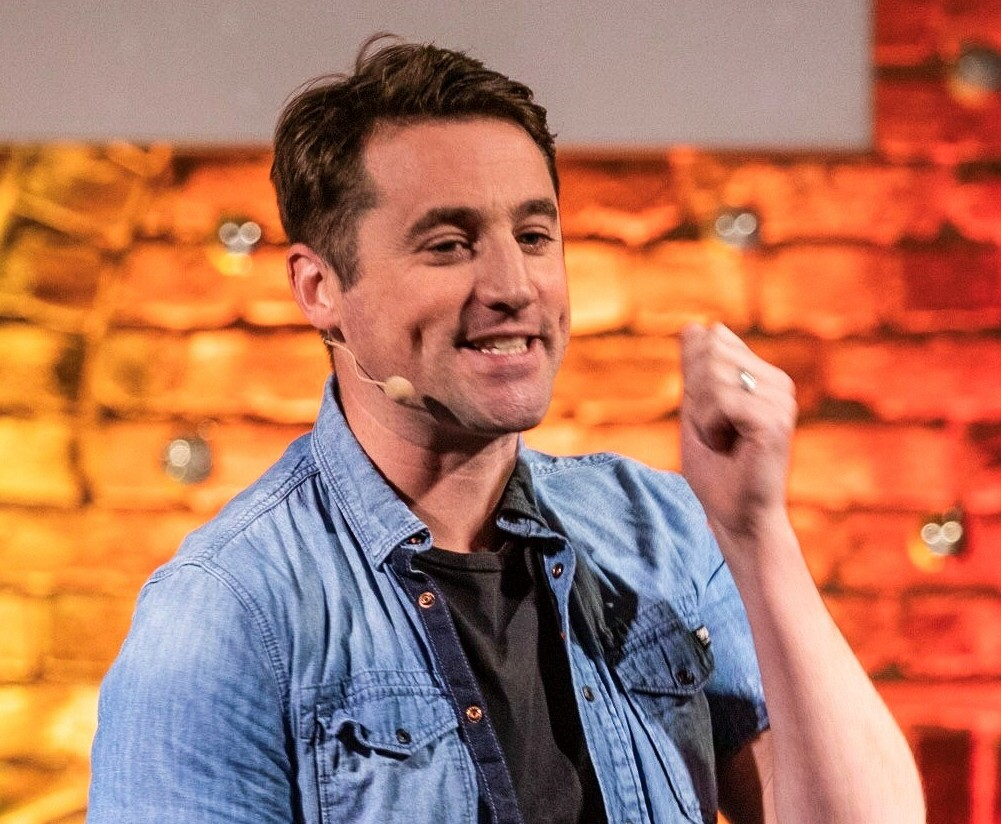
- Hughes in 2018

Background information
- Born: Timothy David Llewelyn Hughes; 23 July 1977 (age 49)
- Origin: London, England
- Genres: CCM, worship
- Occupations: Worship leader, Anglican priest
- Instrument: Guitar
- Years active: 1997–present
- Label: Survivor
- Website: www.worshipcentral.org
- Priest-in-charge of St Luke's, Gas Street
- Church: Church of England
- Diocese: Diocese of Birmingham
- In office: 2015 to present

Orders
- Ordination: 29 June 2013 (deacon) by Richard Chartres; 22 June 2014 (priest) by Paul Williams

Personal details
- Denomination: Anglicanism
- Spouse: Rachel (m. 2004)
- Children: Four
- Education: University of Sheffield; St Mellitus College

Timothy David Llewelyn Hughes (born 23 July 1977) is a British worship leader, singer, songwriter, and Anglican priest. Formerly the director of worship at Holy Trinity Brompton, a large Anglican church in central London, he has since been ordained as a minister in the Church of England and appointed Vicar of St Luke's, Gas Street Birmingham. He leads Worship Central, an international worship training and resource centre. Hughes has written a number of songs that are sung worldwide, including the Dove Award-winning "Here I Am to Worship", "Happy Day", "Beautiful One", "Jesus Saves", "At Your Name", and "The Way".

== Personal life ==
Hughes, the son of an Anglican vicar, grew up in High Wycombe, before moving to Birmingham as a teenager when his father was appointed vicar of St John's Church, Harborne. He studied history at Sheffield University, graduating in 2000.

Hughes is married to Rachel and has four children.

== Career ==
=== Worship leader ===
Hughes began his music career in 1997, when he was invited by Mike Pilavachi to lead worship at a Soul Survivor festival. After the departure of Matt Redman from Soul Survivor Watford Church, Hughes succeeded him as Worship Pastor. In 2005, he moved to Holy Trinity Brompton, an Anglican church in central London, as director of worship. In 2015, he and his family moved to Birmingham where they have launched and now head up Gas Street Church.

He is a member of Compassionart, a charity founded by musician Martin Smith, the front man of Delirious?.

=== Ordained ministry ===
Hughes trained for ordination at St Mellitus College, a non-residential Anglican theological college in London. On 29 June 2013, he was ordained in the Church of England as a deacon by Richard Chartres, Bishop of London, during a service at St Paul's Cathedral, London. On 22 June 2014, he was ordained as a priest by Paul Williams, Bishop of Kensington, during a service at St Mary Abbots, Kensington.

From 2013 to 2015, Hughes served his curacy at Holy Trinity Brompton (HTB) in the Diocese of London. In 2015, he was appointed priest-in-charge of St Luke's, Gas Street, Birmingham in the Diocese of Birmingham. This was a church plant from HTB, and involved the renovation and consecration of a derelict warehouse to use as a church for Hughes and his team. The church officially launched on 5 February 2016.

=== Worship Central ===
With Holy Trinity Brompton's associate director of worship, Al Gordon, Hughes established Worship Central, a worship training and resource centre, aiming to have an international impact.

=== Music recording ===
Hughes' songs were published in the UK by Survivor Records and distributed globally by EMI CMG, a major music label documented as market share leader from 1998 to 2009. He is currently signed under Integrity Music.

Hughes has recorded and released six albums: Here I Am to Worship in 2001, When Silence Falls in 2004, Holding Nothing Back in 2007, Happy Day in 2009, Love Shine Through in 2011, and Pocketful of Faith in 2015.

Here I am to Worship Hughes' album, Here I Am to Worship was released in 2001. The album introduced the worship songs "Jesus, You Alone" and the Dove Award-winning song "Here I Am to Worship". Both songs have become world-renowned worship anthems.

When Silence Falls Released in 2004, When Silence Falls featured well-known tracks, "Beautiful One", "Consuming Fire", and "Whole World in His Hands". The bonus track on the album, "Saviour" featured the hip hop group 29th Chapter, from west London.

Holding Nothing Back Hughes' third album, Holding Nothing Back, was released on 3 April 2007, and includes songs like "Living for your glory", "The Highest and the Greatest", "God of Justice", "Everything", and "Happy Day". In 2007, prior to the recording of Holding Nothing Back, Christian Today interviewed Hughes, asking him, "Do you think any of the songs have the potential to become worldwide hits like some of your previous singles ("Here I am to Worship" and "Beautiful One")?" Hughes responded that what connected with people was often a surprise and hard to predict.

Happy Day In July 2008, Hughes recorded a live album and DVD, Happy Day, at a Worship Central event held on 16 September 2008 at the Shepherds Bush Empire, London. The recording featured a mix of previously released material and brand new songs, including "Give us your courage". The album was released at the Worship Central Global Day on 14 March 2009, in London's Westminster Central Hall.

Love Shine Through On 11 March 2011, a fourth studio album was released, Love Shine Through. The recording was produced by Martin Smith and featured musicians Marc James, Michael Guy Chislet and members of Northern Irish band, Rend Collective Experiment.

Pocketful of Faith On 17 July 2015 Hughes released his fifth studio album, Pocketful of Faith. The album was produced by Nathan Nockels and includes songwriting collaborations with Martin Smith, Matt Redman, Reuben Morgan, Phil Wickham, Jonas Myrin and Tim's Worship Central teammates Nick Herbert, Luke Hellebronth and Ben Cantelon.

=== Literary publishing ===
Hughes published Passion For Your Name in 2003, in which he gives his advice on many issues, including worship leading and songwriting.

Hughes has published a book called Holding Nothing Back (the same name as his third album) and was interviewed by Premier.tv's Christian TV On Demand, to promote the book.

== Honours ==
In June 2017, he was awarded the Cranmer Award for Worship by the Archbishop of Canterbury "for his outstanding contribution to contemporary worship music".

== Discography ==
=== As lead artist ===
==== Studio albums ====
Title	Details	Peak chart positions			
Title	Details	UK	UK Christ.	UK Indie	US Christ.
Here I Am to Worship	Released: 24 December 2001; Label: Worship Together Records; Formats: CD, digital download, streaming	—	—	—	—
When Silence Falls	Released: 1 January 2004; Label: EMI, Survivor; Formats: CD, digital download, streaming	—	—	—	—
Holding Nothing Back	Released: 3 April 2007; Label: Sparrow Records, Survivor; Formats: CD, DVD, digital download, streaming	—	—	—	—
Love Shine Through	Released: 20 March 2011; Label: Kingsway Music; Formats: CD, digital download, streaming	— (Note: Love Shine Through did not enter the UK Albums Chart, but peaked at number 42 on the UK Album Downloads Chart.)	—	14	44
Pocketful of Faith	Released: 17 July 2015; Label: Integrity Music; Formats: CD, digital download, streaming	98	1	9	—
"—" denotes a recording that did not chart or was not released in that territory.

==== Collaborative albums ====
Title	Details
Reward (with Martyn Layzell)	Released: 21 May 1999; Label: Survivor; Formats: CD

==== Live albums ====
Title	Details
Happy Day	Released: 14 March 2009; Label: Survivor; Formats: CD, digital download, streaming

==== Singles ====
Title	Year	Peak chart positions	Album
Title	Year	UK Christ.	Album
"Here I Am to Worship"	2001	—	Here I Am to Worship
"Happy Day"	2010	—	Holding Nothing Back
"At Your Name"	2012	—	Love Shine Through
"Make a Way"	2026	3	Non-album single
"—" denotes a recording that did not chart or was not released in that territory.

=== With Worship Central ===
- Lifting High (2009, Survivor Records)
- Spirit Break Out (September 2011, Kingsway)
- Let It Be Known (March 2013, Kingsway)
- Set Apart (October 2014, Kingsway)
- Mercy Road (May 2017)

=== Soul Survivor Event albums ===
- Your Name's Renown – Soul Survivor Live 2001 (2001)
- Soul Survivor Live 2002: Glimpses Of Glory (2002)
- Soul Survivor: Anthem Of The Free (2003)
- Soul Survivor Live 2004: Living Loud (2004)
- Soul Survivor: We Must Go (2005)
- Soul Survivor: Love Came Down (2006)
- Soul Survivor: Living For Your Glory (2007)
- Complete – Live Worship From Soul Survivor 2008 (2008)
- Soul Survivor: Not Ashamed (2009)
- Soul Survivor: Light the Sky (2010)
- Soul Survivor: We Are the Free (2011)
- Soul Survivor: Love Takes Over (2015)

== Published works ==
- Hughes, Timothy R. Passion for Your Name, Kingsway Publications, 2003. ISBN 978-1-84291-175-4
- Hughes, Timothy R. Holding Nothing Back, Kingsway Publications, 2007. ISBN 978-1-84291-352-9
- Hughes, Tim; and Gordon, Al. Worship Central, Alpha International, 2011. ISBN 978-1-905887-26-2
