= St Mark's, Battersea Rise =

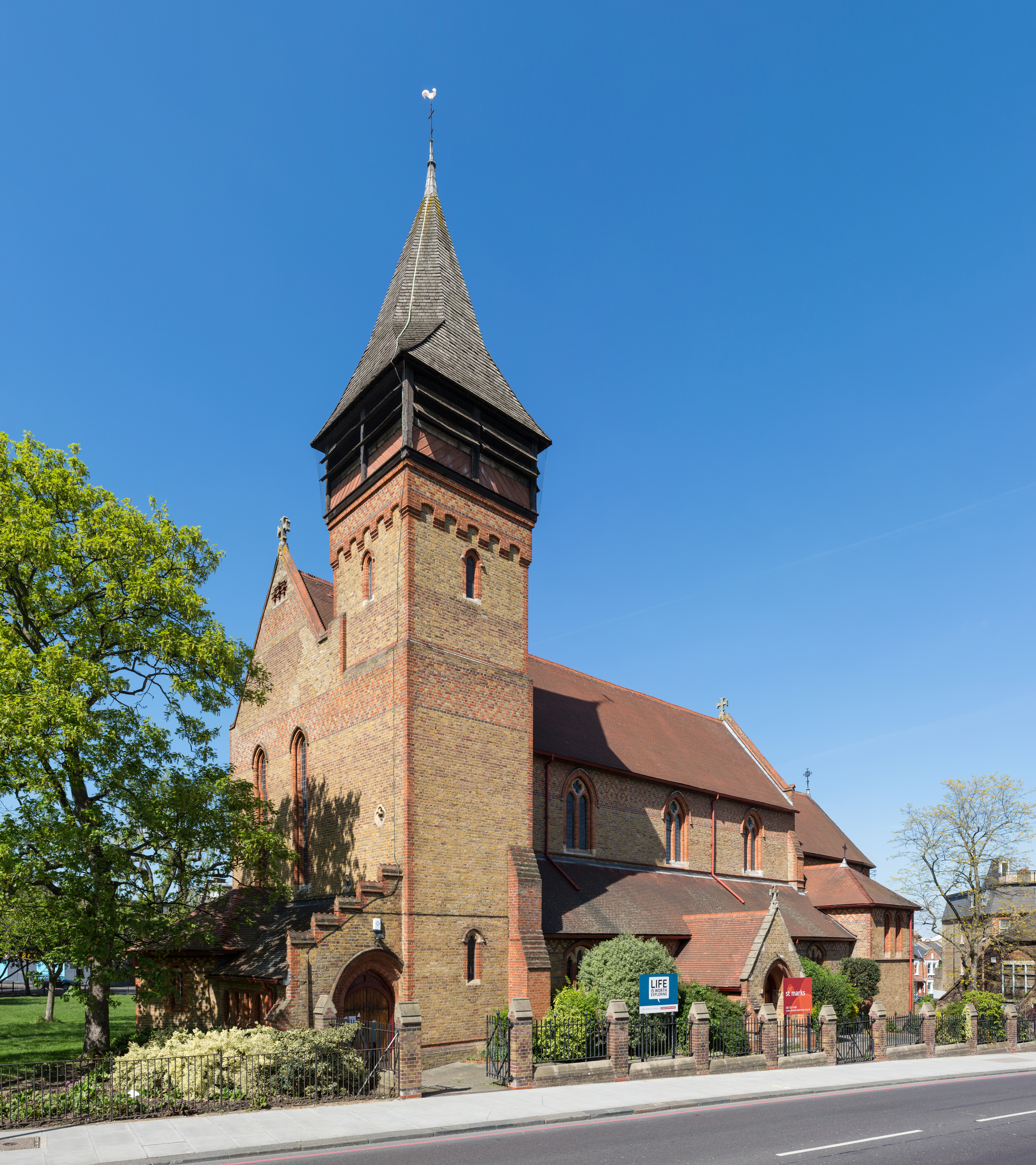
- St Mark's viewed from Battersea Rise
- St Mark's, Battersea Rise
- 51.4604°N 0.1702°W
- Location: Battersea Rise, London
- Country: England
- Denomination: Church of England
- Churchmanship: Conservative Evangelical
- Website: http://www.stmarks-battersea.org.uk

Architecture
- Architect: William White
- Style: Victorian Gothic
- Years built: 1874

Administration
- Diocese: Diocese of Southwark

Clergy
- Vicar: The Revd Martyn Layzell

St Mark's, Battersea Rise, is a Victorian Grade II* listed Anglican church located in Clapham Junction in London. The church was designed by William White and built from 1872 to 1874 in a Geometric Middle-pointed, 13th Century Gothic style using yellow bricks with red brick dressings and diapering. Inside, the nave comprises four bays with north aisles, a tower at the south-west corner supporting a wooden belfry and a shingled spire. Concrete piers with naturalistic stone-carved capitals were produced by Harry Hems. The interior floor is tiled. The choir stalls, pulpit and font were built to White's designs. The altar is raised on a stone plinth behind low brass rails. At the east end, the ambulatory descends to the crypt.

After a declining congregation and a dilapidated church building, the parish recovered as the result of a church plant in 1987 from Holy Trinity Brompton, led by Pastor Paul Perkin, his wife Christine and a group of about 50 followers. Through donations from the congregation, building works have been undertaken, with a new welcome hall and extended meeting hall opened in 2007.

St Mark's Church has been described as conservative and evangelical and was the subject of an article by The Guardian newspaper in 2012, Money becomes new church battleground. The article describes a "bitter power struggle within the CofE and the wider Anglican communion" on conservative issues such as homosexuality and the ordination of women priests.

Boutflower Road, which runs to the east of the church, is named for Henry Boutflower Verdon, the church's first vicar-designate who died, young, in 1879, seven years before the construction of the road as part of Alfred Heaver's St John's Park property development.
