= CompassionArt =

UK charity

CompassionArt is a charity based in Littlehampton, England, founded by songwriter Martin Smith and his wife Anna, with the aim of generating income from works of art to assist in the relief of suffering around the planet.

== Retreat in Scotland ==
Several songwriters met for a retreat in Perthshire, Scotland, set out to write 10–12 songs and, by the end of the retreat, had completed 22 new songs. In addition to those on the GMA Dove Awards, CompassionArt songwriters include Stu Garrard (of Delirious?), Tim Hughes, Graham Kendrick, Andy Park, Darlene Zschech, Israel Houghton, Paul Baloche, Michael W Smith, Steven Curtis Chapman, Chris Tomlin and Matt Redman. Together the songwriters account for at least 42 million albums sold, 82 No. 1 songs, 10 Grammy Awards, 118 Dove Awards, two Stellar Awards, two American Music Awards, and 98 current CCLI Top 500 songs.

This call came through his work Project India, which collects Indian girls from prostitution by offering them any help necessary.

== Board of trustees ==
- Mark Zschech - Charity expert
- Matt Redman - Worship leader and author
- Richard Hubbard - CEO of Links International charity and one of the leaders of Arun Community Church
- Bill Hearn - CEO of Capitol Christian Music Group
- Brett Farrell - Law and Order - Lawyer
- Dave Meyer - CEO of world missions for Joyce Meyer ministries
- Philippa King - Charity expert

== The recording ==
Following the retreat, CompassionArt songwriters began recording the songs in February at the famous Abbey Road Studios in London. Joining the songwriters were musicians Dan Needham, Tommy Sims and Akil Thompson, and engineering were Josiah Bell, Danny Duncan and Sam Gibson. The songwriters continued to record songs in March at Pentavarit Studio in Nashville, joined by guest vocalists Amy Grant, tobyMac and Leeland Mooring, and with Matt Bronleewe and Paul Moak producing and Andy Hunt engineering. With 14 songs now recorded, future recording sessions with the songwriters are planned.

The children on songs like "Come to the Water", "Highly Favored", and "There Is Always A Song", are part of Watoto Children's Choir and were recorded in Kampala, Uganda at Watoto Church studios, engineered and recorded by Kiracho Njoroge Jude.

In addition to the songwriters, the publishers, managers, copyright institutes and agents involved all waived their rights and donated their efforts on this project to CompassionArt. The songs are to be given through CompassionArt to help to raise money for the relief of suffering around the planet. One half of the monies received over the songs' lifetimes will go to the songwriters' charities of choice, and the other 50% will go to a charitable project agreed upon by all the songwriters involved.

The album CompassionArt was released internationally in November 2008.

== Awards ==
CompassionArt became the recipient of the inaugural "Gospel Angel Award" presented by the Gospel Music Channel during the network's telecast of the Dove Awards. GMC created the special award to honor Christian/Gospel artists for helping those in need.

== Aims ==
Martin and Anna Smith had previously visited India where they were so moved by the poverty that they unsuccessfully tried to bring one girl, Farin, to England. The CompassionArt album was dedicated to Farin. Martin Smith and his family went to Uganda in May 2008 to visit some of the Watoto villages outside the capital Kampala, looking at a holistic approach to the care of children. Most of the children they met are orphaned, and some started life rescued from rubbish bins at the side of the road. Smith said in 2009 that the project's success would not be measured in record sales but in lives changed on the ground, with clean water, enough food in a sustainable community and essential medicines.
