= Souled Out (Aberdeen) =

Souled Out is a non-denominational Christian organisation based in Aberdeen, Scotland. It runs worship events roughly once a quarter, all of which are held in the Aberdeen Exhibition and Conference Centre.

Souled Out also organise annual "Encounter" conferences. These are run jointly with the North East Christian Fellowship.

Doxano Music is a record label which produces albums of live worship recorded at Souled Out events.

== Events ==
Souled Out events include both a time of worship and a time of teaching. Worship is led by the Souled Out Band. Individuals from across the UK have spoken at Souled Out events, including Joel Edwards, Director General of the Evangelical Alliance.

Souled Out events run under the mantra "a passionate people faithfully serving the King of Kings".

== Events 2004 ==
The following Souled Out events took place in 2004, with the speakers listed:

- Sat 27 March 2004 - Liam Goligher
- Sat 29 May 2004 - Nigel Pollock
- Sat 25 September 2004 - Mark Inglis
- Sat 27 November 2004 - Gerald Coates

== Events 2005 ==
The following Souled Out events took place in 2005, with the speakers listed:

- Sat 26 March 2005 - Joel Edwards
- Sat 4 June 2005 - Joey Dodson
- Sat 1 October 2005 - George Verwer (ENCOUNTER conference)
- Sat 12 November 2005 - Patrick Sookhdeo

== Events 2006 ==
The following Souled Out events took place in 2006, with the speakers listed:

- Sat 15 April 2006 - Stuart Blythe
- Sat 17 June 2006 - Matthew Henderson
- Sat 11 November 2006 - Jim Clarke

== Events 2007 ==
The following Souled Out events took place in 2007, with the speakers listed:

- Sat 3 March 2007 - Daniel Kim
- Sat 19 May 2007 - Pete Greig

== Accountability ==
The Souled Out team are guided by, and accountable to, a Council of Reference, made up of church leaders from Aberdeen. This group contains leaders from churches of various denomination, including, but not limited to, Baptist and Church of Scotland.

== Charitable Status ==
Souled Out is a not-for-profit organisation and a recognised Scottish Charitable Trust.

== Encounter Conferences ==
In 2005 Souled Out began running weekend conferences known as Encounter. Encounter 05 ran over the weekend of the 1st and 2 October. Over 70 mission and ministry organisations from across the country exhibited at the conference. A Phatfish concert concluded the conference.

Encounter 2006 ran over the weekend of the 16th and 17 September. The keynote speaker was Mark Greene of the London Institute for Contemporary Christianity.

Encounter 2007 ran over the 28–30 September 2007. The main speakers included Nicky Cruz.

== Doxano Music ==
In 2006 Souled Out began releasing live worship albums recorded at Souled Out events under the label Doxano Music. The first release was entitled "Glorify Your Name", the second "Take My Life".
