= Mike Pilavachi =

British evangelist and pastor (born 1958)

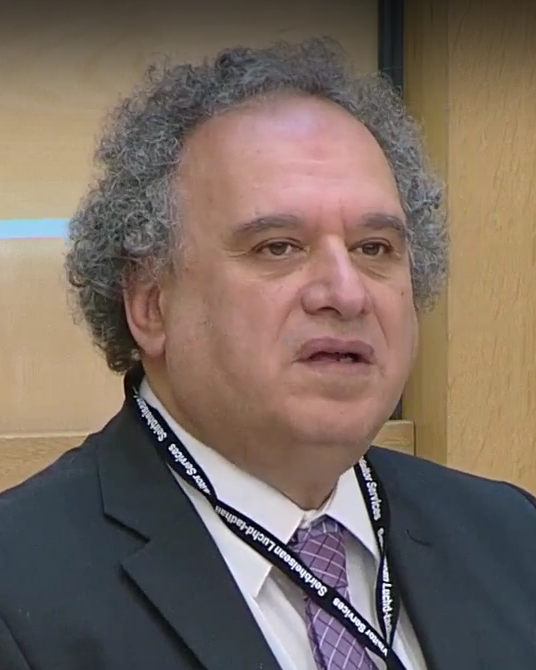
- Pilavachi in 2022
- Born: Michael Pilavachi; 7 March 1958 (age 68)
- Education: St Mellitus College

Ecclesiastical career
- Religion: Christianity
- Church: Church of England
- Ordained: 2012 (deacon); 2013 (priest)
- Laicised: 2024
- Congregations: St Andrew's Church, Chorleywood; Soul Survivor Church, Watford

Michael Pilavachi (/ˌpɪləˈvɑːtʃi/ pill-ə-VAH-chee; born 1958) is a British charismatic evangelist, defrocked Anglican priest, and author. He is a co-founder and former leader of the Soul Survivor charity based in Watford, England.

Pilavachi founded the Soul Survivor summer festivals in 1993, which subsequently ran every year until 2019 and grew to a yearly attendance of around 32,500 young people. Pilavachi was known for encouraging direct contact with the Holy Spirit and practising this at the festivals. Pilavachi and others from his former church established the Soul Survivor Church, Watford, where Pilavachi served as pastor.

In May 2023, Pilavachi was suspended from ministry while under investigation for safeguarding concerns, having stepped back from ministry the previous month. In July 2023, Pilavachi resigned from his role at Soul Survivor Watford. The internal investigation being undertaken by the Church of England concluded in September 2023: they substantiated the accusations against him and concluded that "he used his spiritual authority to control people and that his coercive and controlling behaviour led to inappropriate relationships".

== Early life ==
Pilavachi was born in London in March 1958 to a family of Greek Cypriot heritage. He stated in an interview with Reform magazine that his parents were "militant atheists" who banned him from going to church, but nonetheless he became a Christian at 16 years old.

After studying at the University of Birmingham he worked as an accountant at Harvey Nichols. At 29 years old, a year after joining St Andrew's Church, Chorleywood, he was appointed as a full time youth minister there.

== Ministry ==
=== Soul Survivor ===
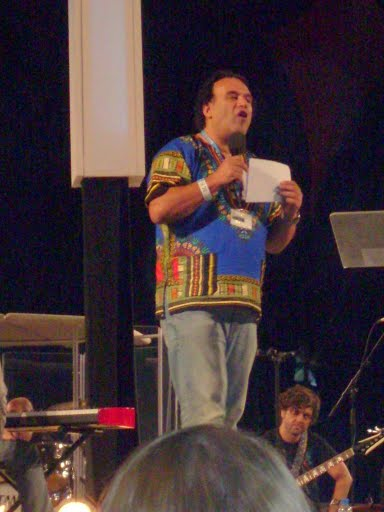
Pilavachi speaking at the Soul Survivor festival in 2009

Pilavachi started the Soul Survivor summer festivals in 1993, after he saw the success of the Christian festival New Wine and was inspired to create a festival for young people to experience charismatic Christianity. The early festivals were supported by St Andrew's and were held at the Bath and West showground. At the same time, a group from St Andrew's went on to establish a permanent Soul Survivor church in Watford, where Pilavachi served as pastor. During the summer festivals, Pilavachi encouraged active interaction with the Holy Spirit.

The festivals continued yearly until 2019, when Pilavachi announced that the Soul Survivor conference would be ending, after the Soul Survivor team felt that God had told them to stop. In the final year, around 32,500 young people attended over three separate week long festivals.

=== Ordained ministry ===
Pilavachi trained for ordination at St Mellitus College, an Anglican theological college in London. He was made a deacon in the Church of England at St Albans Abbey on 1 July 2012, and ordained a priest the following year. He served as a curate at St Peter's Church, Watford, in the Diocese of St Albans from 2012, and was made an honorary canon of St Albans Cathedral in 2016. On 30 June 2020, The Archbishop of Canterbury Justin Welby awarded Pilavachi with the Alphege Award for Evangelism and Witness.

On 18 January 2024, the Church of England clarified that Pilavachi had no authority to minister, but could return after being "fully risk assessed". However, by September 2024, he had been fully laicised.

== Safeguarding investigation and substantiated allegations ==
On 2 April 2023, Soul Survivor Watford announced that Pilavachi had "stepped back from all ministry" while "non-recent safeguarding concerns" were investigated by the Church of England National Safeguarding Team and the diocese of St Albans. On 28 April, the phrase "non-recent" was removed after more recent concerns had become apparent. Pilavachi resigned as a director of the Soul Survivor charity on 4 April.

Also on 4 April, The Daily Telegraph reported on the concerns, adding that the allegations were related to inappropriate messages and intimate relationships with young adults involved in Soul61, a Christian gap year project. On 1 May and 12 May, The Telegraph released further reports detailing the allegations. They alleged that Pilavachi straddled young people to apply full-body oil massages, engaged in up to 20 minute long wrestling matches and preyed upon a "conveyor belt" of young attractive men who he made feel "special". According to The Telegraph, there were allegations by over 100 people spread across three decades, with the most recent in 2020. The Times stated that concerns about Pilavachi's behaviour were first raised with Soul Survivor leadership in 2004 but were not followed up. On 15 May, Archbishop of Canterbury Justin Welby said he was "deeply conscious of the impact" of the reports and backed the Church of England's investigation as being independent from Soul Survivor.

Pilavachi was suspended as an employee of the Soul Survivor charity on 20 May, and on 11 July, Pilavachi resigned as Associate Pastor of the Soul Survivor Church in Watford. In a Facebook post announcing his resignation, Pilavachi stated, "I have taken this step because the Church needs to heal and I have realised that my continued presence will hinder that process" and "I seek forgiveness from any whom I have hurt during the course of my ministry."

On 6 September, the investigation by the Church of England National Safeguarding Team and the Diocese of St Albans concluded. The investigation substantiated the accusations of massaging, wrestling and abuses of power. The associated press release also stated that Pilavachi had resigned his licence to officiate and therefore could no longer minister in the Church of England. In addition, the report noted that a complaint under the Clergy Discipline Measure had been taken out against Pilavachi, which related to "verbal interactions with a vulnerable person" and was ongoing at the time of publication. In January 2024, this investigation concluded and the Church of England gave Pilavachi a written warning for his conduct; they clarified that Pilavachi had no authority to minister, but could return after being "fully risk assessed". However, by September 2024, he no longer had a licence to minister.

Following concerns of the Church of England's objectivity in their investigation, in November 2023, Soul Survivor commissioned the law firm Landmark Chambers to provide an independent report into Pilavachi's conduct. The report was published on 26 September 2024, and verified the reports of coercion, wrestling matches and intimate massages. It also suggested that his "spiritual celebrity" may have been a factor in the failure to stop his behaviour.

In April, Matt Redman, an early worship leader at Soul Survivor, released the documentary "Let There Be Light" on his YouTube channel, which documented his experiences of abuse by Pilavachi.

== Personal life ==
In the 2020 New Year Honours, Pilavachi was appointed a Member of the Order of the British Empire (MBE) for services to young people. In August 2025, Pilavachi's MBE was revoked by the sovereign following calls to remove it after the safeguarding allegations were substantiated.

Pilavachi has stated that his celibacy enabled certain work which he would not have been able to balance with having a family.

== Books ==
- Live the Life (1998)
- Walking with a stranger, discovering God (1999)
- My first trousers, growing up with God (1999)
- For the audience of one, the soul survivor guide to worship (1999)
- Weeping before an empty tomb, struggling with God (1999)
- Afterlife, facing the future with God (2000)
- Life, death (and everything in between) (2001)
- Wasteland?, encountering God in the desert (2003)
- When Necessary Use Words, Changing Lives Through Worship, Justice and Evangelism (2007)
- Storylines: tracing threads that run through the Bible (2008)
- Life Beneath the Surface, Thoughts on a Deeper Spiritual Life (2011)
- Storylines, your map to understanding the Bible (2013)
- Everyday Supernatural: Living A Spirit-Led Life Without Being Weird (2016)
- Lifelines: sound advice from the heroes of the faith (2018)
