= Paul Burton =

Bolivian footballer (1992-2016)

Personal information
- Full name: Paul Jorge Burton Salvatierra
- Date of birth: 25 June 1992
- Place of birth: Beni, Bolivia
- Date of death: 11 December 2016 (aged 24)
- Place of death: Santa Cruz de la Sierra, Bolivia
- Position: Midfielder

Senior career*
Years	Team	Apps	(Gls)
2011–2012	Real Mamoré	13	(0)
2012–2014	San José	32	(0)
2014–2016	Club Petrolero	66	(1)
2016	Oriente Petrolero	2	(0)
Total		113	(1)
- * Club domestic league appearances and goals

Paul Jorge Burton Salvatierra (25 June 1992 – 11 December 2016) was a Bolivian footballer. Burton was left brain dead after a failed surgery for a herniated disc. He died a few days later, on 11 December 2016.

== Career statistics ==
Club Man	Season	League			Cup		Continental		Other		Total	
Club Man	Season	Division	Apps	Goals	Apps	Goals	Apps	Goals	Apps	Goals	Apps	Goals
Real Mamoré	2011	Primera División	8	0	0	0	–		0	0	8	0
Real Mamoré	2011–12	Primera División	5	0	0	0	–		0	0	5	0
Real Mamoré	Total		13	0	0	0	0	0	0	0	13	0
San José	2012–13	Primera División	21	0	0	0	1 (Note: Appearances in the Copa Libertadores)	0	0	0	22	0
San José	2013–14	Primera División	11	0	0	0	–		0	0	11	0
San José	Total		32	0	0	0	1	0	0	0	33	0
Club Petrolero	2014–15	Primera División	35	1	0	0	–		0	0	35	1
Club Petrolero	2015–16	Primera División	31	0	0	0	–		2 (Note: Appearances in the Relegation/promotion playoff)	0	33	0
Club Petrolero	Total		66	1	0	0	0	0	2	0	66	1
Oriente Petrolero	2016–17	Primera División	2	0	0	0	–		0	0	2	0
Career total			113	1	0	0	1	0	2	0	116	1
