= Luke Hellebronth =

British Christian musician (born 1985)

- Birth name: Luke James Hellebronth
- Born: 29 October 1985 (age 39)
- Origin: London, England
- Genres: CCM, worship
- Occupation(s): Singer, songwriter
- Instrument(s): Vocals, singer-songwriter
- Years active: 2003–present
- Labels: Integrity

Luke James Hellebronth (born 29 October 1985) is a British Christian musician, who primarily plays a contemporary Christian style of worship music. His first release, an extended play, Stand Up, was released in 2012, by Integrity Music.

== Early life ==
Luke James Hellebronth was born on 29 October 1985. He started his music ministry in 2003, while he was attending Trinity College of Music studying his craft.

== Music career ==
His music career started in 2003, yet his first extended play Stand Up was released on 12 November 2013 from Integrity Music.

== Personal life ==
He is married to Anna Hellebronth, who is Irish, and they reside in Costa Mesa, California, USA.

== Discography ==
EPs

- Stand Up (12 November 2013, Integrity)
