= Phatfish =

British Christian rock band (1994–2014)

- Also known as: Purple Phatfish
- Origin: Brighton, England
- Genres: Worship, Christian rock, CCM
- Years active: 1994–2014
- Labels: Kingsway, Authentic
- Past members: Lou Fellingham; Nathan Fellingham; Luke Fellingham; Mike Sandeman; Jos Wintermeyer; Ben Hall; Rachel Head; Mike Blow; Adrian Watts; Alan Rose
- Website: phatfish.net

Phatfish were a Christian rock, CCM and worship band from Brighton, England, active from 1994 to 2014. During that time they released nine studio albums and several live releases, as well as a compilation, 15: The Anniversary Collection, in 2008. The principal members of the band were Lou Fellingham (lead vocals), Nathan Fellingham (drums), Michael Sandeman (keyboards), and Luke Fellingham (bass).

Their worship songs "Holy, Holy", "There is a Day" and "Amazing God" have become part of the Christian music canon internationally.

== History ==
=== Early years (1994–2000) ===
The band was formed by Dave Fellingham in Brighton in January 1994, under the name 'Purple Phatfish'. The name was taken from a keyring belonging to one of the band members, of a small fat purple fish which blew air out when squeezed.

The band started life as a jazz-funk/rap group, and spent the first year performing their own songs in music clubs, mainly in the Brighton area. Most of their early songs were not overtly Christian in content. Rapper Rachel Head left the band at the end of 1994, and the band was renamed as 'Phatfish'.

In 1997, the band moved towards more explicitly worship-orientated songs, and released their first album, We Know the Story.

In mid-1998, guitarist Mike Blow and percussionist Adrian Watts left Phatfish. Guitarist Alan Rose joined, and the band started writing again, moving away from jazz-funk towards rock. They made demos with producer Alan Shacklock, and subsequently signed with US label Pamplin, recording their next album, Purple Through the Fishtank, in Nashville in spring 1999. The album increased their profile, and they began touring in Canada, the US and Europe. In 2000, Phatfish released an album of their older music, entitled An Audience With God.

=== 2000s ===
In 2001, they released the album Heavenbound, touring the UK in Autumn 2001 in support of the album.

They recorded three unplugged gigs in the UK in January 2002 for the Hope album, with guests Stuart Townend, Kate Simmonds and Brian Houston; the gigs and album raised money for Hope HIV, a charity supporting AIDS orphans in Africa.

Nothing But the Truth was released in May 2003. Guitarist Alan Rose departed in August 2003, and the band went on hiatus for a year.

Faithful – The Worship Songs featured studio arrangements of many of the band's more 'congregational' worship songs. "The Faithful Tour" took them across England and Scotland, supported by guitarist Dan Wheeler.

The album Trinity was released in 2006, a compilation of tracks from many artists including Phatfish.

The band appeared several times on the BBC's Songs of Praise during 2006 and 2007. They also supported lead singer Lou Fellingham and Stuart Townend on the 'Stu + Lou tour' of the UK.

At the end of 2006, Phatfish released an instruction CD called Working as a band, with advice for aspiring church worship musicians intending to start a band. There Is A Day – The Video Collection was also released at the end of 2006, incorporating music videos, an unplugged concert and interview footage.

In July 2007 Phatfish released Guaranteed, their first studio album since 2003.

In December 2008, the band released a double-CD greatest hits compilation, 15, to celebrate their 15-year anniversary.

In January 2009, guitarists Ben Hall and Jos Wintermeyer joined Phatfish, and the band returned to the studio to record their album In Jesus, released that summer.

=== Final years ===
In December 2010, Phatfish released a new compilation album, Anthems for Worship, a collection of their most popular worship songs for congregational use. The album featured remastered tracks and some new recordings.

Recorded in their own studio during summer 2011, Higher featured more pop-orientated songs and intimate tracks such as the hymn "And Can It Be". Phatfish toured the album around the UK through 2011 and 2012 and accompanied Lou Fellingham on her solo tour in Autumn 2012.

In January 2014, Phatfish announced two final farewell concerts after 20 years together. On 14 and 15 March, they played at Wessex Christian Centre. They were joined on stage for some songs by former guitarists Mike Blow and Alan Rose. The shows were recorded for their final double album Phatfish LIVE.

== Band members ==
Band Role	Year				
Band Role	1994	1995–1997	1998–2003	2004–2008	2009–2014
Lead Vocals	Lou Fellingham				
Guitar					Jos Wintermeyer
Lead Guitar	Mike Blow		Alan Rose		Ben Hall
Bass	Luke Fellingham				
Drums	Nathan Fellingham				
Percussion	Adrian Watts				
Keyboards	Michael Sandeman				
Rapping	Rachel Head				

== Legacy ==
Mike Rimmer of Cross Rhythms wrote in his review of Faithful - The Worship Songs that the "influence of the Phatfish guys on the British worship scene should not be underestimated. Whether as songwriters or as part of the Stoneleigh worship band, they have played a major part in the last 10 years."

Phatfish have contributed many worship songs to the modern church canon, both in Britain and internationally. In an interview with New Word Alive, Nathan Fellingham described Holy Holy as being the band's most popular song that has "travelled furthest around the world". It also featured on Tim Hughes' When Silence Falls and The Livingstone Collective's Portrait of Worship. The band's songs have been included on many compilation, live, studio and instrumental albums internationally, and several of their songs, such as There Is A Day, Amazing God, and Awake Awake O Zion, have been covered by other artists.

== Discography ==
This list includes only Phatfish releases, and does not include other recordings on which the band featured.

- 1994 Purple Phatfish (three song demo, cassette only)
- 1995 River of Life (cassette only)
- 1996 Neworldisorder (six song EP)
- 1997 We Know the Story
- 1999 Purple Through the Fishtank
- 2000 An Audience with God (compilation with some re-recorded material)
- 2001 Heavenbound
- 2002 Hope – Unplugged Live
- 2003 Nothing But The Truth
- 2004 Faithful: The Worship Songs
- 2006 Trinity (compilation with other artists)
- 2006 Working As A Band (Music resource for Church musicians)
- 2006 There Is A Day – The Video Collection (DVD)
- 2007 Guaranteed
- 2008 15 – The Anniversary Collection
- 2009 In Jesus
- 2010 Anthems For Worship
- 2011 Higher
- 2014 PHATFISH LIVE
