= Newday =

Christian annual youth festival

- Founded: August 2004
- Founder: Joel Virgo
- Type: Christian youth event
- Location: Norfolk, UK
- Owner: Clarendon Trust Ltd.
- Key people: Joel Virgo, Stu Gibbs, Matt Simmonds
- Website: http://www.newdaygeneration.org/

Newday is an annual Christian youth festival for churches from all denominations, initially organised by the Newfrontiers family of churches. Established since August 2004, the event is aimed at young people between the ages of 12 and 18.

== Vision ==
Former Newday logo

Newday's stated vision is to play a role in stopping the drift away from God in young people's lives. This includes performing voluntary community work during the festival period, worshipping God through music, preachers and prayers.

== History ==
The first Newday event in 2004 was held at Newark showground, Lincolnshire and was attended by about 3500. It was interrupted by torrential rainfall flooding the camp site causing many young people to be evacuated into nearby schools and leisure centres.

The 2005 event moved to Notts County Stadium, Nottingham, with an attendance of about 5000. The 2006 event was at Uttoxeter Racecourse, Staffordshire, attended by nearly 6000. In 2009, it moved to Norfolk Showground, Norwich, with approximately 7000 people in attendance.

In 2020 and 2021, the event moved online due to the ongoing COVID-19 pandemic.

== Discography ==
This is life CD cover produced at Newday 2008

During each festival, a live album is recorded and released.

== See also ==
- Mobilise, a similar Newfrontiers conference aimed at students and twenties
