= New Wine =

English Evangelical organisation

New Wine Trust
- Founded: 1989
- Founder: David Pytches
- Type: New Wine Trust is a registered charity no. 1084415 and a company limited by guarantee, governed by a memorandum and articles of association.
- Location: Ealing, London
- Origins: St Andrew's Church, Chorleywood, Hertfordshire
- Region served: Worldwide
- Method: Summer conferences, Leadership and Network events, and Overseas activities
- Key people: Paul Langham (Chair of Trustees); Rich Johnson (National Leader)
- Revenue: £4,022,000 (2024)
- Employees: 20
- Volunteers: 5000 (during Summer Conference)
- Website: new-wine.org

New Wine is a not-for-profit Christian charismatic evangelical organisation based in England, United Kingdom. It equips Christian churches and leaders in spiritual renewal, worship and church planting.

== Overview ==
The purpose of New Wine is "local churches changing nations".

New Wine operates in England and multiple other nations worldwide.

Rev Rich Johnson is the National Leader. Rev Paul Langham is the Chair of Trustees.

The organisation is based at 4a Ridley Avenue, London W13.

== History ==
New Wine was set up by the former Bishop of the then-diocese of Chile, Bolivia and Peru, David Pytches, in 1989. Pytches was heavily influenced by the founder of the Vineyard Church, John Wimber, who had held a number of conferences through the 1980s, leading to increased interest in the charismatic movement in the United Kingdom.

== Summer conferences ==
The first New Wine Christian Conference was held in 1989 at the Royal Bath and West Showground, Somerset, and attracted nearly 2,500 people. The event now attracts more than 14,000 people per year.

In 1993 a separate conference, called Soul Survivor, aimed at teenagers and young adults was established by the evangelist Mike Pilavachi, which ran until 2019.

The conference has attracted a number of speakers prominent within the evangelical movement in the United Kingdom and the United States, including Baroness Caroline Cox, Jackie Pullinger, J.John, Heidi Baker, Bill Johnson, Francis Chan, Ken Costa and Brother Yun.

== Associated Organisations ==
New Wine Ireland is based in Belfast. It states its purpose as "working together to change the island of Ireland through a network of church leaders, our summer conference and training events."
