= Ben Cantelon =

- Born: Benjamin Lennart Cantelon; August 5, 1983 (age 43); Vancouver, British Columbia
- Origin: Nashville, United States
- Genres: Contemporary Christian music, worship
- Occupations: Singer, songwriter
- Instrument: Vocals
- Years active: 2005–present
- Labels: Kingsway, Survivor
- Website: weareworship.com/uk/writers/ben-cantelon/

Benjamin Lennart Cantelon (born August 5, 1983) is a Canadian Christian musician, who primarily plays a contemporary Christian style of worship music. He has released three extended plays, Daylight Breaks Through in 2007, with Survivor Records, Introducing Ben Cantelon in 2009, with Kingsway Music, and The Ascent, Vol 1 in 2016, and two studio albums, both with Kingsway Music, Running After You in 2009, and Everything in Colour in 2012.

== Early life ==
Benjamin Lennart Cantelon was born in Vancouver, British Columbia, on August 5, 1983, He was raised in Langley, British Columbia, where he comes from a lineage of pastors, while his father Brent is a pastor with the PAOC.

== Music career ==
Cantelon's music career commenced in 2005, with his first release, Daylight Breaks Through, an extended play, that was released on July 31, 2007, by Survivor Records. The second extended play, Introducing Ben Cantelon, was released by Kingsway Music, on October 20, 2009. His subsequent release, a studio album, Running After You, was released on August 30, 2009, with Kingsway Music. He released, another studio album, Everything in Colour, was released on May 8, 2012, from Kingsway Music. His song, "Saviour of the World", was nominated at the Covenant Awards in 2013, for Modern Worship Song.

== Personal life ==
He is married to Alice Cantelon (née, Buckley), and they reside in Nashville, Tennessee, United States, with their child.

== Discography ==
Studio albums

- Running After You (August 30, 2009, Kingsway)
- Everything in Colour (May 8, 2012, Kingsway)

EPs

- Daylight Breaks Through (July 31, 2007, Survivor)
- Spinning (October 20, 2009, Kingsway)
