= Soul Survivor (charity) =

Christian charismatic evangelical movement

- Founded: 1993
- Founder: Mike Pilavachi, Matt Redman
- Location: Watford, Hertfordshire, England
- Region served: Worldwide
- Members: 1500 (Soul Survivor Watford, 2026); 35,000 (summer festivals)
- Website: soulsurvivor.com

Soul Survivor is a Christian movement, based in Watford, Hertfordshire, part of the charismatic evangelical tradition. From 1993 until 2019, it ran Christian summer festivals aimed at young people, as well as other events throughout the year. It is also the name of a church, centred on weekly worship services at its warehouses in Watford.

== Festivals ==
Soul Survivor
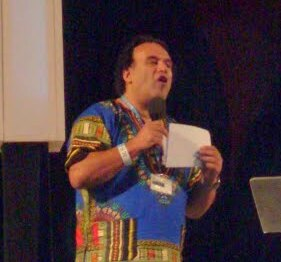
- Mike Pilavachi in a Soul Survivor main meeting
- Dates: Scotland: 21–25 July 2018; NSN: 28 July – 2 August 2018; Week A: 4–8 August 2018; Week B: 18–22 August 2018; Week C: 24–28 August 2018
- Locations: Staffordshire, Peterborough and Kinross
- Years active: July 1993 - August 2019
- Website: http://www.soulsurvivor.com/

Soul Survivor was used as the branding of annual festivals, well known in British evangelical churches. The organisation was registered at Companies House in the UK, on 12 May 2000, and with the Charity Commission on 12 May 2011. At their height, the festivals attracted 30,000 people annually, and in the financial year ending December 2019 during which the final festival took place, the charity had an income of almost £3,800,000.

=== History ===
==== Beginnings ====
By 1993, the number of young people attending the annual New Wine charismatic evangelical Christian family conference every summer at the Royal Bath and West Showground in Somerset was sufficient for the organisers to launch a specific youth event. The first Soul Survivor conference took place in the summer of 1993, under the leadership of Mike Pilavachi, a youth worker at St Andrew's Church, Chorleywood. The worship leader Matt Redman was also involved in the festival's founding. Like New Wine, the Soul Survivor conferences were initially overseen by St Andrew's Church, before being established as independent entities.

==== Growth of the festivals ====
1,896 young people attended the first Soul Survivor festival and in 1995, it was split across two weeks, named Soul Survivor A and Soul Survivor B. By 2006, annual attendance across the two weeks was around 25,000. Soul Survivor C was launched the following year at the Royal Cheshire Showground. In 2008, Soul Survivor A moved to the Stafford County showground with B and C remaining at the Royal Bath and West Showground. A fourth week was launched in July 2014 at the Thainstone Centre in Inverurie, later moving to Lendrick Muir in Kinross. In 2017, Soul Survivor moved to the East of England Showground near Peterborough for the Soul Survivor B and Soul Survivor C festivals. The final Soul Survivor festival ended on 27 August 2019 at the East of England Showground, near Peterborough.

==== Additional events ====
The Momentum festival, aimed at students and young adults in their twenties and thirties, was established in 2004. A further event, Naturally Supernatural, for the whole family, was launched in 2017.

=== Locations ===
Between 1993 and 2019, festivals were held at various sites across the UK. Brands and venues included:

Name	Venue/Location	Age Range	Duration
Soul Survivor A	Stafford County Showground, Staffordshire	Teenagers	5 days
Soul Survivor B Soul Survivor C	Royal Bath and West Showground, Shepton Mallet (until 2017) East of England Showground, Peterborough (2017-2019)	Teenagers	5 days each
Naturally Supernatural	Stafford County Showground, Staffordshire	All ages	6 days
Soul Survivor Scotland	Lendrick Muir, Kinross	Teenagers	5 days

The festivals consisted of seminars, sporting events and art, music and drama workshops during the day, and a charismatic worship service followed by live bands in the evening.

=== Live albums ===
The worship events at the Soul Survivor festivals were often recorded, and each year a live album was released featuring the most popular new songs from the festivals. The albums contained original songs written by the worship teams, as well as traditional and contemporary songs from other artists and churches.

== Soul Survivor Church, Watford ==
Soul Survivor
- Soul Survivor
- 51.67688209206518°N 0.38834570783536093°W
- OS grid reference: TQ 11530 98796
- Address: 5-7 Greycaine Road, Watford, Hertfordshire WD24 7GP
- Country: England
- Denomination: Church of England
- Website: www.soulsurvivorwatford.co.uk

History
- Founded: 1993

Architecture
- Architectural type: Warehouse

Administration
- Diocese: Diocese of St Albans
- Parish: Watford

Clergy
- Pastor: Rev Jon Stevens

A church, based in two converted warehouses in Watford, Hertfordshire, shares the name Soul Survivor but is a legally separate organisation. Started by a team of eleven from St Andrew's, Chorleywood, in its current form, the church was incorporated as a charitable incorporated organisation in June 2019. There are now around 1,000 people attending three services on a Sunday, as well as a number of events throughout the week. Soul Survivor Watford is an Anglican church and so is part of the Church of England but is very relaxed and informal. Sunday services happen at 9.15am, 11.30am and 6.30pm each Sunday, with the 11.30 service livestreamed on YouTube. The church meets in two warehouse in Watford, Hertfordshire.

The church raised £1,789,628 to rebuild part of their site in June 2018.

Soul Survivor Watford is a Bishops' Mission Order of the Diocese of St Albans, and part of the Church of England.

=== Investigation into Mike Pilavachi ===
In April 2023, it was announced that Mike Pilavachi had "stepped back from all ministry," including his roles leading Soul Survivor, while an investigation was carried out into "non-recent safeguarding concerns". The internal investigation was completed in September 2023, substantiating the allegations made against Pilavachi and concluding that "he used his spiritual authority to control people and that his coercive and controlling behaviour led to inappropriate relationships".

=== 2026 funding ===
In January 2026, the Diocese of St Albans announced that £2.3 million of funding would be made available for church planting, and that Soul Survivor Watford would support this programme, although Soul Survivor Watford will not receive any direct financial support. The announcement was criticised by advocates for Pilavachi's victims.

== Other events ==
=== UK ===
In 2000, the Soul Survivor team partnered with The Message Trust on Message 2000 and Festival: Manchester, gathering 10,000 young people in the city.

This was followed in 2004 with "Soul In The City", in London, a mission in which 20,000 young people from around the world gathered in the capital to undertake practical projects and evangelistic events.

Soul Survivor also organised "Soul In The City Durban" which took place in Summer 2009 in Durban, South Africa.

=== International ===
Soul Survivor has also held festivals and other events in the following locations:

Country	Locations	Established	Status
Australia	Melbourne	2000	Inactive (as of 2018)
Australia	Sydney		Active
Malaysia	Selangor		Active
Netherlands	Putten	1998	Active
New Zealand	Feilding	2007	Active
South Africa	Durban		Active
United States	Newport Beach	2000	Active

== Legacy ==
A seminar on vocation to Christian ministry was timetabled at the festival every year, often led by principals of Church of England training colleges. Former Bishop of Kensington Graham Tomlin suggested that the events had a positive impact on the number of young church leaders training, particularly looking towards deployment in the church planting movement.

The festivals were also influential in the growth of the charismatic worship movement in the UK. Worship leaders Matt Redman and Tim Hughes, whose songs were sung internationally, began their careers at the events.

== See also ==
- The Message Trust
- Survivor Records - a record label affiliated with Soul Survivor, distributed by Kingsway Communications.
- Worship Central
