= Survivor Records =

- Founded: 1997
- Distributor(s): Kingsway Communications
- Genre: Worship music, Christian rock
- Country of origin: UK
- Official website: www.kingsway.co.uk

Survivor Records is a British Christian Music record label and is a sub-ministry of Kingsway Communications. The label launched in 1997 as a medium by which to publish music associated with the Soul Survivor events. One of the first artists signed was Matt Redman, who had been involved with Soul Survivor for many years.

== Notable artists ==
- Vicky Beeching
- Brenton Brown
- Tim Hughes
- Martyn Layzell
- Ben Cantelon
- Beth Croft
- LZ7
- onehundredhours
- Phatfish (now with Authentic Media)
- Matt Redman
- Tree63
- YFriday

== See also ==
- Kingsway Communications
- List of record labels
