= Freedom of religion in Russia =

In Russia, freedom of religion is provided for in Chapter 1, Article 14, Chapter 2, Articles 28 and 29 of the 1993 constitution, which forbid the federal government from declaring a state or mandatory religion, permit the freedoms of conscience and profession of faith, and forbids state advocacy purporting superiority of any group over another on religious grounds. However, each of these provisions have been contrasted against a clause in Chapter 2, Article 55 that permits the federal government to restrict human rights where it is deemed necessary and under specific conditions. With these articles taken collectively, and as there is no explicit provision allowing for the automatic right of religious groups to exist as establishments, proselytize, or provide guidance, "religious freedom" as would be defined in other nations is not guaranteed.

In practice, as of 2021, allegations of religious persecution, unequal treatment of religious groups, and calls for the respect of free religion have been made against the Russian government.

== Overview ==
The Law on Freedom of Conscience and Religious Associations (also known as the 1997 Law) declared that all religions are equal before the law, prohibited government interference in religion, and established simple registration procedures for religious groups. The country, by law, would be a secular state without a state religion. The preamble to the 1997 Law acknowledged Christianity, Islam, Buddhism, Judaism, and other religions as an inseparable part of the country's historical heritage, and also recognized "the special role of Orthodoxy in the history of Russia and in the establishment and development of its spirituality and culture".

The U.S. Department of State reported in its 2007 International Religious Freedom Report, "Following the 1997 Law's registration deadline of December 31, 2001, the Ministry of Justice began to legally dissolve approximately 2,000 organizations that had not reregistered, sometimes over the complaints of groups who claimed that they were still active."

In 2020, the USCIRF noted that the US State Department recommends that Russia be seen as a Country of Particular Concern. The International Religious Freedom Act sees CPC countries as "engaging in or tolerating severe violations of religious freedom".

In 2022, Freedom House saw Russia as scoring 20 out of 100 in political and civil liberties. This has spilled over into religious freedom, and in 2023, the country was scored 1 out of 4. In particular, they highlighted 2017's Supreme Court decision to support the countries definition of Jehovah’s Witnesses as extremists.

According to data from the V-Dem Institute, the state of freedom of religion in Russia has steadily deteriorated since 1991.

The invasion of Ukraine in February 2022 also highlighted international concerns.

== History ==
See also History of the Jews in Russia, Religion in Russia, and Religion in the Soviet Union

=== 10th to 20th Centuries ===
In the 10th century, Prince Vladimir I was converted to Christianity by missionaries from Byzantium. He embraced Christianity and made it an official religion in Russia. For approximately 1,000 years thereafter, Russian Orthodoxy became the country's primary denomination.

In the early days of the Russian Revolution, the Bolsheviks mobilized Jewish support for their movement when Lenin proclaimed that the antisemitic pogroms of old were a trapping of Tsarism and had no place in a workers' movement. Despite the official attempts to court Russian Jews, antisemitism and anti-Jewish violence was continually perpetrated by the Red Guard throughout the country during the difficult transition out of the World War I.

By 1922, the Russian Empire collapsed and the Soviet Union was officially established. Despite the Soviet Constitution guaranteeing religious freedom, religious activities in the Soviet Union were greatly constrained, and a doctrine of state atheism was established and introduced. Memberships to religious organizations were considered incompatible with memberships in the Communist Party (ruling political party of the Soviet Union). Temporarily, the open expression of Christian beliefs was permitted during World War II as the government sought the support of Christians in the fight against Fascism. However, the restrictions were re-imposed once the war ended, and intolerance towards religion in general continued.

In the 1980s, under the reformist administration of Mikhail Gorbachev, the policy of glasnost (English: openness) was established, allowing for greater tolerance for the practice of religion. With the dissolution of the Soviet Union, religious freedom became a guaranteed right under the new Russian Constitution, and large segments of the population began practising a variety of faiths. Russian nationalists who emerged in the 1990s identified the Russian Orthodox Church as a major element of Russian culture.

The 1990 Soviet Law and Religious Freedom introduced a legal guarantee of "full equality of all religious groups", acting in compliance with the Convention for the Protection of Human Rights and Fundamental Freedoms and the International Covenant on Civil and Political Rights.

After the 1997 Law's December 31, 2001 registration deadline, Russia's Ministry of Justice began to dissolve around 2,000 organizations that had not re-registered, at times over the complaints of organizations who claimed that they were still active.

=== Early 21st Century ===
The 2016 Yarovaya Law, named after politician Irina Yarovaya, extends the legal restrictions against extremism to include evangelism by minority faiths.

The Russian government has a number of laws against religious extremism and foreign funding of non-government organizations including the Yarovaya Law, that can be used to restrict the practices of religious minorities, such as evangelism or the importation of foreign religious literature. Critics of these laws argue that the Russian government gives priority to the Russian Orthodox Church, making it an unofficial state church. According to experts, the law is likely to be interpreted in a way to block churches other than the Russian Orthodox Church from evangelizing ethnic Russians.

According to International Christian Concern, in 2021 the "crackdowns on religious freedom have intensified in Russia." In June 2021, Forum 18 highlighted that “twice as many prisoners of conscience are serving sentences or are in detention awaiting appeals for exercising freedom of religion or belief as in November 2020.”

== Religious demography ==
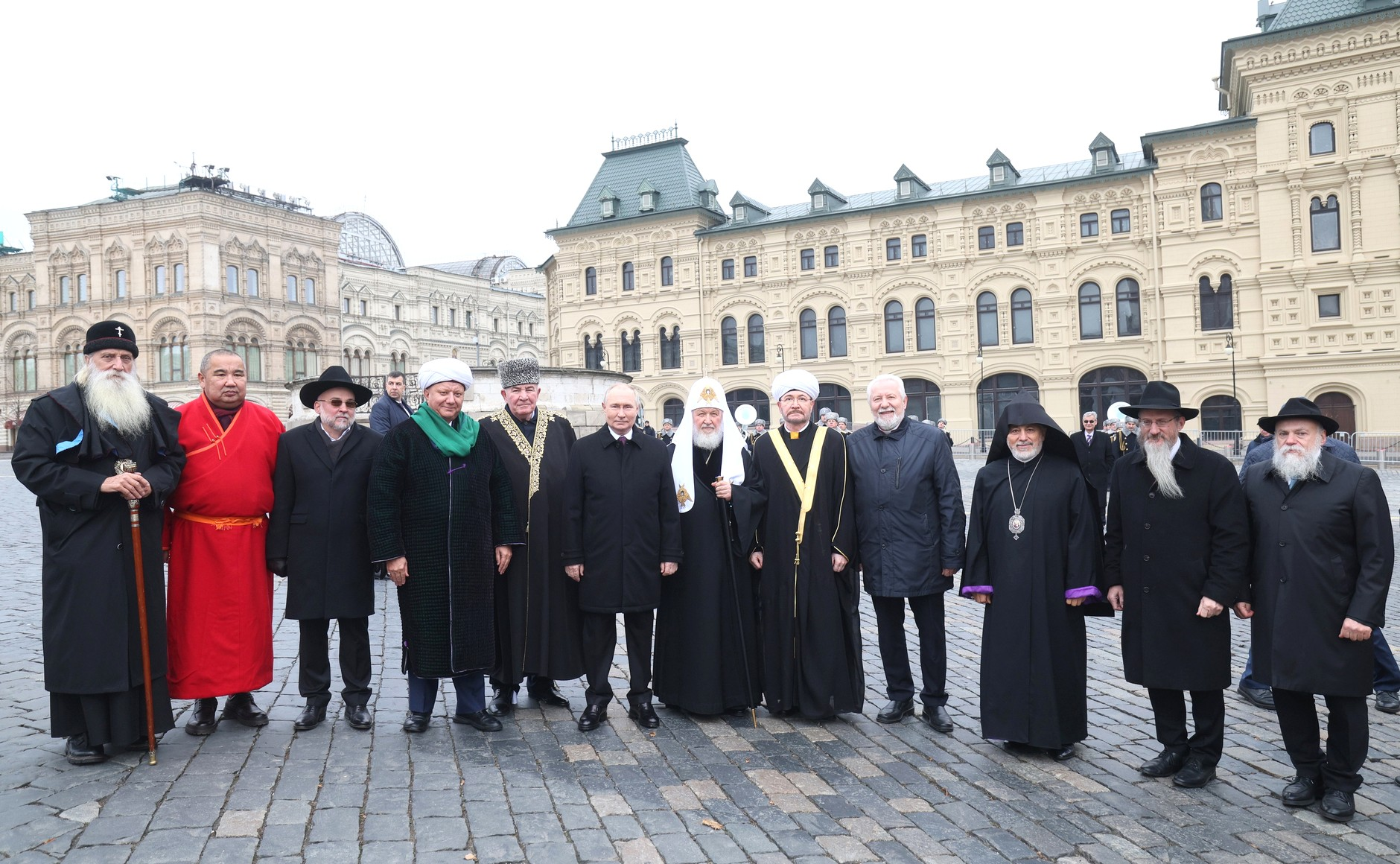
Putin with Kremlin-controlled religious leaders during the official celebrations of the National Unity Day on 4 November 2023

The country has an area of 17,098,242 km^{2} (6,601,668 sq mi) and a population of 146 million. There is no single set of reliable statistics that breaks down the population by denomination or active participation, and the statistics below are compiled from government, polling, and religious group sources.

The 2017 Survey Religious Belief and National Belonging in Central and Eastern Europe made by the Pew Research Center showed that,

- 73% of Russians declared themselves Christians, including
  - 71% Orthodox,
  - 1% Catholic,
  - 2% Other Christians
- 15% were unaffiliated
- 10% were Muslims
- 1% were from other religions

Approximately 100 million citizens consider themselves Russian Orthodox Christians, although the vast majority are not regular churchgoers.

The largest religious minority is formed by 14 to 23 million Muslims, most of whom live in the Volga-Urals region and the North Caucasus, although Moscow, St. Petersburg, and parts of Siberia and Yakutia have sizeable Muslim populations.

The Buddhist Association of Russia estimated that there were between 1.5 and 2 million Buddhists, who live in the traditionally Buddhist regions of Buryatiya, Tuva, and Kalmykia.

According to the Slavic Centre for Law and Justice, Protestants make up the second-largest group of Christian believers, with 3,500 registered organizations and more than 2 million followers.

There are an estimated 600,000 Jews (0.4% of the population), the vast majority of whom live in Moscow and St. Petersburg.

The Catholic Church estimated that there are 600,000 Catholics, most of whom are not ethnic Russians.

In Mari El, Yakutiya and Chukotka, pantheistic and nature-based religions are practiced independently or alongside other religions.

According to Human Rights Ombudsman Vladimir Lukin's annual report, the Ministry of Justice had registered 22,956 religious organizations as of January 1, 2007. This was 443 more than in January 2006. Among the registered religious groups are Russian Orthodox, Orthodox Old Believers, Muslim, Buddhist, Jewish, Evangelical Christians, Catholic, and other denominations.

In 2022, there were 67,720,000 Christians, with 58,750,000 of them belonging to the Russian Orthodox Church.

The following details are informed by the 2020 International Religious Freedom Report.

== Status of religious freedom ==
Some Russian federal agencies, such as the Federal Registration Service and many local authorities, continued to restrict the rights of some religious minorities. Legal obstacles to registering under a complex 1997 Law on Freedom of Conscience and Religious Associations (which lists Orthodox Christianity, Islam, Judaism, and Buddhism as traditional religions) continued to seriously disadvantage some religious groups considered non-traditional. There were indications that the security services, including the Federal Security Service (FSB), treated the leadership of some Islamic groups as security threats.

There are reports of societal abuses and discrimination based on religious beliefs or practices. However, conditions remain largely the same for most, and government policy continues to contribute to the generally free practice of religion for the majority of the population. Thus, religious matters are not a source of social tension or problems for the majority of citizens.

Resistance against non-Orthodox religions was behind manifestations of anti-Semitism and occasional friction with non-Orthodox Christian denominations. Conservative activists claiming ties to the Russian Orthodox Church (ROC) occasionally disseminated negative publications and held protest meetings against other religions, including alternative Orthodox congregations. Some ROC clergy stated publicly their opposition to any expansion of the presence of Roman Catholics, Protestants, and other non-Orthodox denominations.

=== Legal and policy framework ===
The 1990 Soviet Law and Religious Freedom introduced a legal guarantee of "full equality of all religious groups", acting in compliance with the Convention for the Protection of Human Rights and Fundamental Freedoms and the International Covenant on Civil and Political Rights.

The Constitution provides for freedom of religion, and the Government of Russia generally respected this right in practice. However, it seems that in some cases the authorities imposed restrictions on certain groups, most often through the registration process. The Constitution also provides for the equality of all religions before the law and the separation of church and state. However, the Government did not always respect this provision. Article 14 reads that "no religion may be established as State or obligatory" and also that “religious associations shall be separate from the State and equal before the law."

In November 2006, the Government eliminated the value-added tax on religious products sold by religious organizations.

=== The 1997 Law ===
The Law on Freedom of Conscience and Religious Associations (a.k.a. the 1997 Law) declares that all religions are equal before the law, prohibits government interference in religion, and establishes simple registration procedures for religious groups. The country is by law a secular state without a state religion. The preamble to the 1997 Law, however, acknowledges Christianity, Islam, Buddhism, Judaism, and other religions as constituting an inseparable part of the country's historical heritage and also recognized the "special contribution" of Orthodoxy to the country's history and to the establishment and development of its spirituality and culture.

The 1997 Law creates three categories of religious communities (groups, local organizations, and centralized organizations) with different levels of legal status and privileges.

The most basic unit of a religion is the individual congregation, which has the authority to make decisions about how its members practice their faith. This includes the right to hold religious services and ceremonies, as well as to pass on religious teachings and beliefs. A group is not registered with the Government and consequently does not have the legal status to open a bank account, own property, issue invitations to foreign guests, publish literature, receive tax benefits, or conduct worship services in prisons, state-owned hospitals, and the armed forces. However, individual members of a group may buy property for the group's use, invite personal guests to engage in religious instruction, and import religious material. In principle, members of unregistered groups are thus able to rent public spaces and hold services, but in practice, they sometimes encountered significant difficulty in doing so.

The next level is the "local religious organization", which can be registered if it has at least 10 citizen members and is either a branch of a centralized organization or has existed in the locality as a religious group for at least 15 years. Local religious organizations have legal status and may open bank accounts, own property, issue invitation letters to foreign guests, publish literature, enjoy tax benefits, and conduct worship services in prisons, state-owned hospitals, and the armed forces.

"Centralized religious organizations" can be registered by joining at least three local organizations of the same denomination. In addition to all the legal rights enjoyed by local organizations, centralized organizations also have the right to open new local organizations without any waiting period. Centralized organizations that have existed in the country for more than 50 years have the right to use the words "Russia" or "Russian" in their official names.

The 1997 Law gives officials the authority to ban religious groups and thereby prohibit all of the activities of a religious community. Following the passage of the law, groups that failed to re-register by December 31, 2000, became subject to legal dissolution (often translated as "liquidation"), i.e., deprivation of juridical status.

==== NGO Law ====
The 2006 Law on Public Associations (NGO or NPO Law) contains a few provisions that apply to religious organizations.

The NGO law grants the Ministry of Justice the authority to obtain certain documents, send its representatives (with advance notice) to attend religious organization events, and conduct an annual review of the organization's compliance with its registered mission statement. Religious organizations are required to inform the Federal Registration Service (FRS) of changes in leadership or address within 3 days of the changes taking effect. The law allows FRS to file suit against organizations that fail to comply with the law's requirements. If a court finds in favour of FRS, then the organization may be closed down. In addition, a contemporaneous amendment to the Civil Code may affect religious organizations, but the effect of this amendment and all other amendments remains to be seen. Some denominations with numerous local organizations feared that compliance with these changes would be highly burdensome.

Jehovah's Witnesses reported that federal officials used the NGO Law to investigate their headquarters, and that government officials told them the investigation was launched based on this law.

Under NGO law, religious organizations have new reporting requirements. These reporting requirements are extensive, and many NGOs and religious groups complained about the time and effort needed to complete them. The required reporting includes information about "organised events and activities" and accounts of funds received from international and foreign organizations, foreign citizens, and stateless persons. This generates difficulties in reporting anonymous donors. Failure to file reports and complete them adequately can result in warnings that may lead to the organization being closed down.

After lobbying by many religious groups, including the ROC, the Government reduced the reporting requirements for all religious organizations and extended the financial reporting deadline of the NGO Law to June 1. Russian organizations are no longer asked whether they receive income from Russian individuals or the Russian state. Although each organization must still supply full names, addresses, and passport details of members belonging to its governing body, they no longer have to provide details of religious congresses, conferences or governing body meetings, including the number of participants. The accounting procedures have been significantly simplified.

While neither the constitution nor the 1997 Law grants explicit privileges or advantages to the four "traditional" religions, in practice the ROC cooperates more closely with the Government than do other faiths. The ROC has entered into several formal and informal agreements with various government ministries that give the ROC far greater access than other religious groups to public institutions such as schools, hospitals, prisons, the police, and the army. ROC activities with the Government include support for the psychological rehabilitation of servicemen returning from conflict zones, the holding of religious services for those serving in conflict zones, and cooperation with the Ministry of Internal Affairs to combat extremism.

The ROC has special arrangements with government agencies to conduct religious education and provide spiritual counselling. These include agreements with the Ministries of Education, Defence, Health, Internal Affairs, and Emergency Situations, and other bodies, such as the Federal Tax Service, Federal Border Service, and Main Department of Cossack Forces. Not all of the details of these agreements were accessible, but available information indicated that the ROC received preferential treatment.

Officials in law enforcement and the legislative branches spoke of protecting the "spiritual security" of the country by discouraging the growth of "sects" and "cults", usually understood to include some Protestant and newer religious movements. In January 2007, the Moscow City Prosecutor warned of the danger posed by extremist and dangerous new religious movements entering the country and promised tough measures to stop their activities. To date, no such measures have been proposed or implemented.

The National Security Concept of the Russian Federation, last updated in 2000, states that "ensuring national security includes countering the negative influence of foreign religious organizations and missionaries."

Representative offices of foreign religious organizations are required to register with state authorities, and they may not conduct services or other religious activities unless they have acquired the status of a group or organization. In practice, many foreign religious representative offices opened without registering or were accredited to a registered religious organization.

The Moscow City Duma is proposing a law that would prohibit "religion agitation" in public. Administrative punishment for violations under this article would be approximately $4–20 (100-500 rubles).

The regions of Kabardino-Balkariya and Dagestan have laws banning extremist Islamic "Wahhabism", but there were no reports that authorities invoked these laws to deny registration to Muslim groups. However, the former president of the Kabardino-Balkaria republic ordered the closure of six of seven mosques in Nalchik, the region's capital. The new president of the region has reopened one mosque and announced plans to reopen another.

Officials of the Presidential Administration, regions, and localities maintain consultative mechanisms to facilitate government interaction with religious communities and to monitor application of the 1997 Law. At the national level, groups interact with a special governmental commission on religion, which includes representatives from law enforcement bodies and government ministries. On broader policy questions, religious groups continued to deal with the Presidential Administration through the Presidential Council on Cooperation with Religious Associations. The broad-based Council is composed of members of the Presidential Administration, secular academic specialists on religious affairs, and representatives of traditional and major nontraditional groups. Other governmental bodies for religious affairs include a Governmental Commission for the Affairs of Religious Associations, headed by the Minister of Culture and Mass Communications.

Avenues for interaction with regional and local authorities also exist. The offices of some of the seven Plenipotentiary Presidential Representatives (Polpreds) include sub-offices that address social and religious issues. Regional administrations and many municipal administrations also have designated officials for liaison with religious organizations. Religious minorities most often encounter problems at the regional level.

The Russian Academy of State Service works with religious freedom advocates, such as the Slavic Center for Law and Justice, to train regional and municipal officials in properly implementing the 1997 Law. The Academy opens many of its conferences to international audiences.

The Office of Federal Human Rights Ombudsman Vladimir Lukin has a department for religious freedom issues, which receives and responds to complaints. The Ombudsman's Office receives 200–250 religious freedom complaints annually, which represents thousands of alleged individual violations. The Office has determined that approximately 75 percent of these cases represent genuine violations of religious freedoms guaranteed under the law.

Contradictions between federal and local laws, and varying interpretations of the law were used by some regional officials to restrict the activities of religious minorities. According to many observers, local governments are more susceptible to pressure from the local religious majority and therefore are more likely to discriminate against local minority religious communities. Many localities appeared to implement their own policies with very little federal interference. When the federal Government intervenes in local cases, it works through the Procuracy, Ministry of Justice, Presidential Administration, and the courts. The federal Government only occasionally intervened to prevent or reverse discrimination at the local level.

In July 2006, the country hosted the World Summit of Religious Leaders, where President Putin spoke to the participants about increasing religious tolerance. Officials met regularly during the reporting period with leaders of several faiths, including Christian, Muslim, and Jewish communities.

The federal Government does not require religious instruction in schools, but it continues to allow public use of school buildings after hours for the ROC to provide religious instruction on a voluntary basis. Several regions offer a course on Orthodoxy in public schools, and five regions (Kaluga, Tver, Bryansk, Smolensk, and Voronezh) have a mandatory class on the Fundamentals of Orthodox Culture. The Belgorod Oblast voluntary course can be avoided only if the parents themselves provide and pay for an alternative course. The course is offered as an elective in several other regions. In regions where the class is not mandatory, in practice students may be compelled to take it where schools do not provide alternatives. Minister of Education Andrey Fursenko warned against these lessons, and he proposed instead a course on "world religions" or on Orthodoxy. Fursenko's proposal remained controversial among some experts, including some in the ROC. Some regions offer a class on "History of Religion", a proposal that Fursenko suggested but did not introduce nationally. The Ministry of Education rejected the continued publication and dissemination of a textbook that detailed Orthodox Christianity's contribution to the country's culture, with descriptions of some minority religions that members of those religions found objectionable; for example, the text's stance on Jews, certain non-traditional denominations, and foreigners is considered problematic by some. Some schools continued to use the text.

There is a universal military draft for men, but the Constitution provides for alternative service for those who refuse to bear arms for reasons of conscience. The length of alternative service is longer than the standard military service. The standard length of military service is 18 months, alternative service in a Ministry of Defence agency is 27 months, and alternative service in a non-defence agency is 31.5 months. Some human rights groups have complained that the extended length of service for draftees requesting alternative assignments acts as a punishment for those who exercise their convictions.

In July 2006, a new law came into effect that repeals deferrals for students of religious training institutions. The law was protested by many religious groups, including the ROC.

==== Extremism laws ====
The 2002 Law on Extremism, amended in July 2006, can affect religious groups, particularly Muslim groups, by criminalizing a broad spectrum of activities. For example, Mansur Shangareev was convicted of extremism and sentenced to 2 years in prison for "actively adhering to a radical trend of Islam" that claimed superiority over mainstream Islam, and for making "remarks to Muslim girls about their immodest dress", among other things.

The 2006 amendments allow some charges of extremism where people are alleged to have defended or expressed sympathy with other individuals already charged with extremism.

Laws against extremism have been tightened over time. The 2016 Yarovaya Law, named after politician Irina Yarovaya, extends the legal restrictions against extremism to include evangelism by minority faiths.

On May 5, 2015, customs authorities in Russia seized a shipment of religious literature containing Ossetian language Bibles published by Jehovah's Witnesses. Russian customs officials in the city of Vyborg held up a shipment of 2,013 Russian language copies of Bibles on July 13, 2015. Customs authorities confiscated three of the Bibles, sent them to an "expert" to study the Bibles to determine whether they contained "extremist" language, and impounded the rest of the shipment.

On July 21, 2015, the Russian Federation Ministry of Justice added Jehovah's Witnesses official website to the Federal List of Extremist Materials thereby making it a criminal offence to promote the website from within the country and requiring Internet providers throughout Russia to block access to the site.

On March 23, 2017, the Russian News Agency TASS reported, "Russia's Justice Ministry has suspended the activities of the religious organization calling itself Administrative Centre of Jehovah's Witnesses in Russia due to its extremist activities." On April 5, 2017, the Supreme Court of Russia heard a request by the Russian Justice Ministry to declare Jehovah's Witnesses an extremist organization and adopted it. The ruling banned the organization's activity across Russia and resulted in seizure of their property. Later that year, Dennis Christensen, a Danish Jehovah's Witness, was arrested for being a "religious extremist". On January 23, 2019, Christensen was put on trial and sentenced to 6.5 years in prison. This was the first case of a person being put on trial in Russia due to them being a Jehovah's Witness.

A spokesman for the Jehovah's Witnesses reported in late 2021 that, since the organization was outlawed in 2017, Russian authorities have brought 257 criminal cases involving 559 believers; 70 of them are now in prison, 31 are under house arrest, and 1,594 homes have been raided.

On June 7, 2022, the European Court of Human Rights in the case “Taganrog LRO and Others v. Russia” found that the Russian liquidation of the Jehovah's Witnesses and the repression of the organization in Russia was unlawful.

=== Restrictions on religious freedom ===
Restrictions on religious freedom generally fall into four categories: registration of religious organizations, access to places of worship (including access to land and building permits), visas for foreign religious personnel, and government harassment of religious organizations or individuals. In the first three cases, religious communities rely upon government officials to grant them permission to assemble, own, or build property, or allow people into the country.

Many of the difficulties that religious communities face are rooted in bureaucratic obstacles and corruption, not religious bigotry. While it is nearly impossible to discern if groups are being targeted because of their religious beliefs or because they are vulnerable to demands by corrupt officials, the net effect is a restriction on their ability to worship.

==== Registration ====
Following the 1997 Law's registration deadline of December 31, 2001, the Ministry of Justice began to legally dissolve approximately 2,000 organizations that had not re-registered, sometimes over the complaints of groups who claimed that they were still active. Complaints of involuntary dissolution have decreased as this wave of dissolutions has passed, and only a few remain to be contested in court.

Due to legal restrictions, poor administrative procedures on the part of some local authorities or disputes between religious organizations, an unknown number of groups have been unable to register. Some religious groups registered as social organizations because they were unable to do so as religious organizations.

In June 2007, a St. Petersburg Court suspended and ordered The Scientology Centre in St. Petersburg to close. The centre had refused to allow government officials to sit in on confidential "auditing" sessions and did not hand over confidential documents from these sessions when requested. Government authorities claimed to have a right to these inspections and documents under the new NGO law. The Centre continued to operate at the end of the period covered by this report.

The Unification Church was contesting the refusal of officials to re-register three local organizations. The Unification Church alleged that its registration process had been complicated by the requirements imposed by a broad range of government agencies, including the fire safety office, tax inspectors, and epidemiological inspectors. The Church also reported that federal authorities investigated its compliance with visa rules, and scrutinized missionaries' activities and property holdings.

Local authorities continued an investigation of the Jehovah's Witnesses Administrative Centre—their national headquarters in St. Petersburg—in what the Jehovah's Witnesses described as a search for an excuse to shut down their operations. The authorities indicated to the Jehovah's Witnesses that any irregularity they found would be used as grounds to close the centre. On February 16, 2007, the centre wrote to the Prosecutor General's Office expressing concern over the investigations, which had continued for more than 2 years. The St. Petersburg Prosecutor's Office, the Prosecutor General's Office, and the Office of the Human Rights Ombudsman of the Russian Federation sent replies stating that the investigators had not exceeded their authority and had not violated the law.

As of December 2006, the Federal Registration Service had registered 407 Jehovah's Witnesses local organizations in 72 regions, but problems with registration continued in some areas, notably Moscow, where the Moscow Golovinskiy Inter-municipal District Court and the Moscow City Court (of appeal) have banned them since 2004. The Moscow community appealed the ban to the European Court of Human Rights (ECHR).

In June 2006, the FRS branch in Novosibirsk used the NGO law and found that a local Pentecostal church, the Word of Life Church, violated its charter by organizing a show in a Siberian military unit. The FRS sent a written notification to the church stating that if they violated their charter again, the FRS would file a suit to close the church.

During the reporting period, the European Court of Human Rights (ECHR) unanimously ruled against the Government on three religious freedom cases involving the registration of the Salvation Army, the Jehovah's Witnesses, and the Church of Scientology. In all three cases, the court unanimously determined that the Government violated its international obligations under the European Convention for the Protection of Human Rights and Fundamental Freedoms. Other religious freedom cases against the Government were pending at the ECHR.

In Moscow Branch of the Salvation Army v. Russia, the ECHR ruled in October 2006 that the Government's refusal to re-register the Moscow branch of the organization violated the right of assembly and freedom of religion of the Salvation Army. The Government paid $13,418 (10,000 Euros) in damages and legal fees to the Salvation Army. The Salvation Army cannot re-register its Moscow branch, as the deadline for re-registration under the 1997 Religions Law was May 2000. They may only be re-registered by the Moscow Chief Directorate of the Ministry of Justice. It was the Chief Directorate that designated the Salvation Army as a paramilitary organization, and successfully argued in court that this prevented re-registration. The Supreme Court did not address this designation, nor did they remove it.

In the Jehovah's Witnesses case, Kuznetsov and Others v. Russia, the ECHR ruled in January 2007 that Chelyabinsk authorities had violated the rights of the Chelyabinsk Jehovah's Witnesses when they disrupted a worship meeting in 2000. The court ordered the Government to pay $121,486 (90,544 euros) to the Jehovah's Witnesses.

In the Church of Scientology Moscow v. Russia case, the ECHR ruled that Moscow authorities violated the religious freedom rights of the Church of Scientology under the European Convention on Human Rights by refusing to re-register their Moscow church. The Scientologists had applied to re-register 11 times with no success. The Government did not appeal, and the decision is final.

Local authorities refused to register Scientology centres as religious organizations in Dmitrovgrad, Izhevsk, and other localities. Since these centres have not been in existence for 15 years, they are by law ineligible to register as religious organizations and cannot perform religious services (although they were allowed to hold meetings and seminars). The Churches of Scientology in Surgut City and Nizhnekamsk (Tatarstan) filed suits with the ECHR contesting the refusal of officials to register the churches based on the 15-year rule. The ECHR found the suits admissible in June 2005 and combined the cases. The case awaited a final decision, which the Church of Scientology expected by the end of 2007.

According to FRS statistics, there are 22,956 registered religious groups operating in the country, approximately half of which are affiliated with the ROC. In 2005, the last year for which statistics are available, authorities investigated the activities of 3,526 religious organizations during the 2005 calendar year. The Ministry of Justice sent notifications of violations to 2,996 religious organizations. The courts made decisions to liquidate 59 local organizations for violations of constitutional norms and federal legislation during that period.

The Jehovah's Witnesses alleged in some cases that authorities had consulted with the ROC in determining whether to approve their requests for registration.

Many religious groups had difficulty acquiring land or permits to build houses of worship. Some local governments prevented religious groups from using venues suitable for large gatherings such as cinemas and government facilities.

Some religious groups, particularly Jehovah's Witnesses, but also the Church of Jesus Christ of Latter-day Saints (LDS), Pentecostal congregations, and the Evangelical Christian Missionary Union, reported that local authorities in recent years denied them permission to acquire land on which to construct places of worship. Authorities continued to deny construction permits to several groups.

Many non-traditional denominations frequently complained that they were unable to obtain venues for worship. Because they are small and often newly established, they often lacked the necessary resources to buy or rent facilities on the open market and must rely on government assistance. Because they are nontraditional, they frequently met opposition from the traditional communities and often were unable to find government officials who were willing to assist them in renting state-owned property. There were multiple reports of religious organizations who were not allowed to renew leases on public and private buildings. Increased competition for space in a growing economy and increasing real estate prices led many owners (public and private) to lease property to higher-paying clients, and in some cases, religious groups were refused outright at any price.

Representatives of multiple Protestant groups spoke about increasing difficulty in extending existing leases or signing new leases for worship premises, the majority of which are still state-controlled. For example, administrations in Tikhoretsk and Volgograd refused to extend rental agreements with member churches of the Union of Christian Evangelical Missionaries, which used the spaces for worship.

The Word of Life Christian Church in Kaluga region faced great difficulties trying to build its church. The Church had been frequently visited by tax, fire, and other government inspectors. In December 2006, the mayor issued a decree to confiscate the Church's building and land, which would then be given to a foreign commercial developer. The Church's appeals to the governor, prosecutor, and police were unsuccessful, although the property had not been confiscated.

The NGO Sova Centre reported at the end of the reporting period that the Vladimir Muslim community still was not able to obtain public land to build a mosque. In 2004, despite interference from the Vladimir city authorities, the congregation constructed a mosque on private land near a house that community members bought and used as a temporary prayer house. The mosque was called a community house and was used by the local community of Muslims even though it did not have room for all 25,000 members.

The Sochi mayor's office continued to deny the Muslim community authorization to build a new mosque; the current premises insufficiently accommodate the membership. Officials allotted land several times but never transferred it to the Muslim community. According to the regional government, authorities can allocate land for a mosque only after a public opinion survey indicates that the proposed location would not cause conflict. In March 2007 Abdul-Vakhed Niyazov, Chairman of the Sochi Russian Islamic Cultural centre, asked Presidential Representative to the Southern Federal District Dmitriy Kozak to investigate.

On 14 May 2007, at a public hearing in the city of Murmansk, residents of the central city district voted to refuse the Jehovah's Witnesses permission to build a church in the city's downtown area. Mayor Mikhail Savchenko issued a statement noting that even though it was his preference that new places of worship be built outside of the city center, he regretted the lack of tolerance shown at the public hearing. Jehovah's witnesses in Dezershinsk, Nizhny Novgorod Oblast failed to obtain land for constructing a building of worship.

Religious news sources claimed that authorities acting on behalf of the ROC sometimes prevented Orthodox churches not belonging to the ROC, including the True Orthodox, from obtaining or maintaining buildings for worship. In 2005 a church reconstructed and renovated by the Russian Orthodox Autonomous Church (ROAC) was transferred to the ROC Diocese of Stavropol. The subsequent protest by the ROAC culminated in the beating of Metropolitan Valentin (see the Abuse section) and threats to other ROAC clergy. The Zheleznogorsk City Administration subsequently promised to allot a new building to the ROAC, but had not done so by the end of the reporting period.

There was an ongoing conflict between the Moscow Hare Krishnas and the Government regarding allocating a plot of land for worship. In the first half of 2007, Moscow City authorities rescinded their allotment of land for the construction of a Krishna temple in the Moscow city centre and instead allotted the Krishnas 5 acres (20,000 m^{2}) of land in the Moscow suburbs.

Since Richen Ling, a Tibetan Buddhist community, lost its Moscow city centre premises in 2004 due to a municipal construction project, it continued to rent facilities since it has been unable to secure a permanent house of worship.

The Unification Church reported difficulties in establishing a Eurasian Church Centre in Moscow to coordinate church activities in the region. The authorities would not allow the church building to be occupied until an annex illegally built by the former owner was legalized. The church estimated that the building would remain closed for 2 years until all the necessary documentation was done.

Local officials have refused permission to build to a Catholic parish in Barnaul (Altai Region) and to a Muslim community in Sochi for more than 10 years.

The Church of Scientology reported that it sometimes had difficulties getting permits for large events in Moscow.

In October 2006 local authorities in Tyumen destroyed a building that was intended to house a mosque. The Muslim community had spent years working to receive ownership of the building, which had been a mosque before the 1917 revolution. The authorities had decided to give the building to the Muslim community earlier that year.

In June 2006, the city of Krasnodar demanded the demolition of a private home intended to host worship for an Evangelical group. The lower court upheld the city's decision. A court appeal was pending.

In January 2006, the district court in Astrakhan ordered the demolition of a mosque on an access road to the city. The construction of the mosque had been allowed by the mayor in 1998, but officials argued in 2006 that the land was zoned residential, that the mosque was illegally built, and that the community must demolish it. Following the failure of their appeal to the Russian Supreme Court, which upheld the demolition order and held the Muslim community must pay for the demolition itself, the Muslim community appealed to the ECHR, which agreed to hear the case.

The Emmanuel Pentecostal Church continued to face difficulties building its church in Moscow. The old House of Culture, which the Emmanuel church wants to convert into a prayer house and office building, sits on land that the local land committee agreed to rent to the church. Other local authorities opposed to that location for the church have up the registration of the land title, some on grounds that local public opinion is against the religious community involved. They refused to allow the building to be reconstructed as a church. On March 26, 2007, arsonists set the building on fire.

The 1997 Law appeared to change the visa regime for religious and other foreign workers. Immediately after its implementation, nontraditional groups reported problems receiving long-term visas.

During the reporting period, the number of foreign religious personnel experiencing visa and customs difficulties while entering or leaving the country decreased, although some problems continued. Authorities have deported or denied entry to religious workers with valid visas in the past. The Unification Church in Moscow appealed the January 2006 deportation of its founder and legal/spiritual adviser, Jack Corley, to the ECHR. By law he must remain outside of the country for at least 5 years, at which point he can reapply for residence. The ECHR appeal joined two similar cases involving deportations of Unification Church foreign missionaries. A member of the Japanese Unification Church invited to Ufa to make a presentation was detained by FSB officers and forced to buy tickets to Moscow for himself and an FSB officer for onward deportation to Japan. He appealed the deportation and won the right to re-enter.

In June 2007, the Government threatened to deport three Falun Gong followers to China, where they could face official persecution. The UN High Commission on Refugees arranged to have these practitioners resettled to other countries. On March 28, 2007, officials deported a Falun Gong follower and her young daughter to China.

In December 2006, a Moscow court rejected the appeal against deportation of Sunday Adelaja, a leader of the Ukrainian "Embassy of God." Church The court found Adelaja's deportation to be "in the interests of state security." In May 2006, while traveling to Moscow in order to participate in a television program, Adelaja had been denied entry at a Moscow airport, despite having a multiple-entry visa.

Visa problems decreased for some groups. Groups such as the LDS and Roman Catholic churches, among others, reported that the Government issued most of their clergy 1-year visas that may be extended to 5-year visas after they have entered the country. They reported that the administration of the visas had improved since the last reporting period. Foreign clergy are particularly important for the Roman Catholic Church, since there are few ordained Russian priests. Catholic authorities reported a decrease in visa problems for priests during the period covered by this report.

Many religious groups were unable to regain property confiscated in the Soviet era and to acquire new property. The SOVA Center said the property problem was most prevalent among Muslims and Protestants.

Although authorities have returned many properties used for religious services, including churches, synagogues, and mosques, all four traditional religions continued to pursue restitution cases. As of May 2007, the Ministry of Economic Development and Trade was preparing legislation on returning most religious property (except for a few cultural and historical treasures) to its pre-1917 owners.

The ROC appeared to have greater success reclaiming pre-revolutionary property than other groups, although it still had disputed property claims. At the end of the reporting period, the Moscow Diocese of the ROC owned more than 1,400 buildings, up from 130 in 1998.

Property claims for the ROC are legally complicated, since there was no separation of church and state before the revolution. Most of the Orthodox church buildings that were returned to the ROC were not considered ROC property before 1917. The ROC was only entitled to use these buildings and theoretically could have been evicted, but there was no attempt to do so. The ROC fully owned only churches built, bought, or received after 1991.

The Roman Catholic community reported 44 disputed properties, including the Saint Peter and Saint Paul Cathedral in Moscow. While most state-owned property was returned, the community had no success with buildings that had been privatized. The community continued to work with authorities in the federal and local levels to resolve these issues.

Muslims in Beslan appealed to the Presidential Council for Cooperation with Religious Associations for the return of its Cathedral Mosque.

The Jewish community was still seeking the return of a number of synagogues and cultural and religious artefacts. The Federation of Jewish Communities reported that federal officials had been cooperative in the community's efforts to seek restitution of former synagogues, as had some regional officials, although some Jews asserted that the Government had returned only a small portion of the total properties confiscated during the Soviet period. The international Chabad Lubavitch organization repeatedly sought return of the Schneerson Collection, a large collection of revered religious books and documents of the Lubavitcher rebbes, which the authorities consider part of the country's cultural heritage.

Some human rights groups and religious minorities accused the Procurator General of encouraging legal action against a number of minority religions and of giving official support to materials that are biased against Muslims, Jehovah's Witnesses, the LDS, and others. There were credible reports that individuals within the federal security services and other law enforcement agencies harassed certain minority religious groups, investigated them for purported criminal activity and violations of tax laws, and pressured landlords to renege on contracts. In some cases the security services were thought to have influenced the Ministry of Justice to reject registration applications.

Law enforcement officials in Kabardino-Balkariya reportedly kept lists of students who said Muslim prayers, had Muslim middle names, or who sent clips with Islamic themes through their mobile phones. During the reporting period, the Sova Centre reported that in general the pressure on Muslims in Kabardino-Balkariya dropped with the appointment of the republic's new leadership.

A school principal in Argayash allegedly forced a member of the Pentecostal church to resign from her kindergarten teaching post or else face criminal charges of maltreating children. Local news reports cited complaints from parents that implied that the teacher had been teaching about religion and alleged that she had physically mistreated them. Church officials maintained that these charges were fabricated and that she was actually removed due to her religious beliefs.

In June 2007 officials in the city of Uzlovaya banned a Christian music festival organized by local Baptist churches. The officials originally gave permission for the festival but revoked it after reportedly receiving phone calls from the local FSB. The mayor reportedly claimed not to have known that the festival was a religious event.

In May 2007 local authorities in the town of Revda, Murmansk Oblast ordered the closure of a Pentecostal drug and alcohol rehabilitation centre for the homeless. Two members of the town council and a local Russian Orthodox priest first organized public opposition to the centre and held a screening of a negative film about Pentecostals. Pentecostals were not invited to the public hearing that decided the issue; they showed up nonetheless and were booed by the approximately 800 participants. The town council then voted to close the centre. The Pentecostals planned to appeal the matter to a court.

On December 25, 2006, a court found Viktor Tanakov, high priest of the ethnic Mari faith, guilty of incitement to religious and ethnic hatred for having written and distributed a brochure entitled "The Priest Speaks", which describes all world religions as "demonic." He lost his appeal to the Supreme Court on March 21, 2007.

In June 2007 a Moscow district court published a ban on the works of Said Nursi, a Turkish pacifist Islamic theologian. The ban, which was being appealed, was condemned by religious and human rights leaders. Ravil Gainutdin, Chairman of the Russian Council of Muftis, wrote an open letter to President Putin describing the Risale-i Nur ban as "a crude violation of freedom of conscience in our country." Vladimir Lukin, the Human Rights Ombudsman, denounced the ban, saying that Nursi's works contained no trace of religious hatred or intolerance. In an open letter to the court, Lukin wrote that "It is very important that we do not allow interference in the convictions and beliefs of millions of citizens on the poorly grounded, unproven pretext of fighting against extremism, as this really could provoke wide-scale violations of their right to freedom of belief."

There has been a trend of senior government officials showing support for those religious leaders who endorse them; this can lead to indirect discrimination. For example, in St. Petersburg, an Imam at Cathedral Mosque endorsed United Russia, which supported his plans for a second mosque in the city. At the same time, Muslims not part of Cathedral Mosque were unable to obtain permission to construct their own mosque in St. Petersburg. Governor Valentina Matviyenko noted in response to a letter of inquiry that this is in part because they are "in a state of conflict" with and "follow a different trend of Islam" from the Cathedral Mosque community.

Local authorities in St. Petersburg began an investigation of the Jehovah's Witnesses Administrative Centre, their national headquarters, even before the 2006 NGO law's implementing regulations were published. The authorities indicated that any irregularity they found would cause them to close the centre. Federal and local authorities continued their investigations of the centre in 2007. On February 16, 2007, the centre wrote to the Prosecutor General's Office, expressing concern over the investigations, which had continued for more than 2 years. The St. Petersburg Prosecutor's Office, the Prosecutor General's Office, and the Office of the Human Rights Ombudsman sent replies stating that the investigators had not exceeded their authority and had not violated the law.

The Government in practice gave preference to the ROC. Authorities permitted Orthodox chapels and priests on army bases. Protestant groups had more limited access to military facilities, while authorities largely banned Islamic services in the military and generally did not give Muslim conscripts time for daily prayers or alternatives to pork-based meals. Some recruits serving in the army reported that fellow servicemen insulted and abused them because they were Muslim.

=== Abuses of religious freedom ===
Although there are several laws addressing crimes motivated by ethnic or religious hatred, law enforcement agencies enforced these laws in an inconsistent, generally infrequent, and sometimes arbitrary manner.

Authorities rarely prosecuted or sentenced those arrested for attacks and vandalism against religious minorities, and they often failed to bring hate-crime charges even when religious bigotry was clearly involved. Some government officials denied that there was a problem with hate crimes, or if they did exist, they were manifestations of economic ills. Some government officials and human rights observers noted that, due to heavy caseloads, prosecutors chose to file easily proven charges of vandalism or hooliganism rather than risk an acquittal on the harder-to-prove hate-crime motive. The result was that hate crime legislation was often not enforced.

The Government also used counter-terrorism to commit serious violations of religious freedom against the Muslim population. There were a number of cases of Muslims being prosecuted for extremism or terrorism even when they have no clear relation to such activities. These included individuals detained for possessing religious literature such as the Qur'an, or on the basis of evidence allegedly planted by the police. Some people suspected by local police of Islamic extremism allegedly were subjected to torture and ill-treatment.

According to human rights groups, a Supreme Court decision to ban 15 Muslim groups for alleged ties to international terrorism made it easier for officials to arbitrarily detain Muslims for alleged connections to these groups.

On 24 May 2007, during an inter-ethnic brawl in Stavropol between hundreds of Russian and Chechen youths, Gelani Ayatev was badly beaten and soon after died of his injuries. Zaurbek Akhmadov, an eyewitness, said that riot troops and local police cheered on skinheads as they physically assaulted Ayatev, who had been handcuffed. Police then put Ayatev, still in handcuffs, and Akhmadov, who had been shot in the leg by police as he tried to help Ayatev, in the back of a police vehicle. According to Akmadov, the police refused to allow medical attention for Ayatev or Akmadov for more than an hour, and in response to Akhmadov's cries to help Ayatev and bring him to a doctor, the policemen answered "Don't worry. He won't be shouting Allah Akbar, anymore."

In the case where a suspect threw a Molotov cocktail at a synagogue in Saratov in May 2007, police were investigating it as a case of "hooliganism" rather than as a hate crime, and had not apprehended any suspects. They declared it may not have been clear to the perpetrator that the building was a synagogue.

In Saratov at the beginning of April 2007, when a Jewish community member's home was targeted in an arson attack and graffiti reading "kikes to Israel" was written on a fence near the synagogue, police investigators classified these incidents as "hooliganism" and had not detained any suspects as of May.

In February 2007, the court gave light prison sentences to five teenagers who beat and fatally stabbed a Jewish man in October 2005, a murder motivated by ethnic hatred.

There were isolated instances in which local officials detained individuals who were publicly discussing their religious views, but usually authorities resolved these instances quickly.

On May 13 and 14, 2007 police arrested and detained 15 members of the Voskresenye Baptist community in Ivanovo, who were holding an event in a movie theatre, distributing the New Testament and Book of Psalms. The organizers of the event had a written agreement with the theatre. The reason given for the inspection appeared erroneous. The police tried to intimidate the detainees and urged them not to attend Baptist meetings, stating it was a "harmful sect."

On March 31, 2006, residents of Novaya Adygeia village were prevented from going to their mosque for Friday prayers. Police and Adygeia militia blocked all the roads into the village, stopped cars, and searched Muslims. According to the Maykop mosque imam, police officers also allegedly assaulted and apprehended a group of young Muslims, including the imam; masked policemen dragged the group to minibuses and took them to the Interior Ministry's Anti-Organized Crime Department. The policemen beat and questioned them about why they wore beards and observed Islamic norms of hygiene. After the Muslims were detained for a night in prison, officials took them before a judge who ordered their immediate release. The NGOs Memorial and SOVA reported that government officials have harassed Muslims in Adygeia since summer 2005, including seizing religious literature, preventing congregants from attending Friday prayers, and warning them to stop attending the mosque.

A complicated case regarding the disruption of an April 2006 meeting of Jehovah's Witnesses in Moscow was still pending. In April 2006 the Lyublino Police Department of Moscow disrupted a religious meeting of Jehovah's Witnesses, and officers detained and interrogated 14 male leaders of the congregation, taking their passports. Police refused to provide written reasons for their detention, reportedly physically assaulted their attorney Vitaly Sinyukov when he went to the police station to assist them, and threatened him at knife-point not to file a complaint. In June 2006 a Moscow district court found the detention of the plaintiffs unlawful but dismissed the remainder of the suit because the Jehovah's Witnesses did not have legal permission to hold the meeting. Both the Jehovah's Witnesses and the police appealed the decision, and on March 22, 2007, the court reversed the June 2006 decision and ruled that the detention had in fact been lawful. The Moscow City Court refused to allow the ECHR judgement Kuznetsov v. Russia to be introduced as evidence in the case.

Vitaliy Sinyukov filed a suit against the Lyublino District Police Department. On April 20, 2006, the Lyublino District Court dismissed the complaint against the police without considering its merits. Sinyukov appealed, and on July 13, 2006, the Moscow City Court reversed the ruling and returned the case to the Lyublino District Court for consideration. On August 16, 2006, the Lyublino District Court again ruled to dismiss the case without considering its merits. Sinyukov appealed again, and on December 14, 2006, the Moscow City Court reversed the ruling in part and again returned the case to the Lyublino District Court for partial consideration of its merits. The case was pending at the end of the reporting period.

On December 24, 2006, local police and officials from the Chelyabinsk Emergencies and Youth departments raided a Pentecostal service at a private house in Argayash and demanded documents relating to the property and church. Police Colonel Ramil Galilullin told the press that the reason for the raid was a complaint by local citizens that children attended the Pentecostal church without parental permission. Following the raid, the authorities also conducted a fire inspection and fined the church for incorrect use of a stove and defective wiring. The Chelyabinsk region public prosecutor opened an investigation into the actions of the authorities in February 2007.

From July 1, 2005 through June 30, 2006, the courts convicted 46 Muslims, 29 of whom were in prison, for membership in Hizb-ut-Tahrir, a pan Islamist organization which aims at the institution of a global caliphate where they'd impose sharia law. Courts gave Anton (Abdullah) Stepanenko, an imam in Pyatigorsk (Stavropol Region), a suspended sentence, partially for inciting religious hatred. Stepanenko's lawyer maintained that he was not permitted to order a psychiatric assessment of a key witness with a long history of mental illness, or to cross-examine scholars responsible for an expert analysis which alleged that Islamic literature—with no proven link to Stepanenko personally—was extremist. Whereas criminal investigators reportedly claimed that Stepanenko was in possession of "Wahhabi" literature (a term widely and loosely used in the country to denote Islamic extremism), President Putin stated that "Wahhabism in itself does not pose any threat."

In February 2006 local police in Kabardino-Balkariya started compiling a list of "Wahhabis" by going to educational institutions and noting the names of students who prayed regularly. Under the new government in that region, however, pressure against Muslims seemed to diminish.

In October 2005, following a dispute between the ROAC and the ROC over the ownership of St. Olga's Church (see Restrictions section), three armed men beat and attempted to kidnap the ROAC Metropolitan from his home. The FSB reportedly interrogated and threatened several ROAC clergy and members following this incident.

Throughout 2005 tensions increased in Kabardino-Balkariya between Islamists and police. Police closed a large number of mosques, especially in areas declared "liberated" by Islamist militants. In October 2005, local militants joined Islamic militants loyal to the Chechen fighter Shamil Basayev and attacked and occupied government and police buildings in Nalchik. Several hundred militants were killed; many of the bodies have still not been returned to their families. Government officials said they arrested more than 60 persons on suspicion of participating in raids, while human rights groups claimed the number of detainees was higher and that most of them were not involved in the unrest.

Following the 2004 hostage-taking in Beslan, police stepped up activity in the North Caucasus. Authorities allegedly charged increasing numbers of Muslims, both Russian citizens and citizens of the predominantly Muslim states bordering the country, with extremism. The NGO Memorial described 23 cases involving more than 80 individuals charged with extremism as "trumped-up." Of these, 18 resulted in verdicts, only 1 of which was an acquittal.

According to the Sova Center, on April 19, 2005, police briefly detained and interrogated nine female students in Kabardino-Balkariya for wearing the hijab and studying the Qur'an as a group.

While most detentions for religious practices were of Muslims, there were occasional reports of short-term police detentions of non-Muslims on religious grounds, but such incidents were generally resolved quickly. For example, local police frequently detained missionaries for brief periods throughout the country or asked them to cease their proselytizing activities, regardless of whether they were actually in violation of local statutes. During the reporting period, the Jehovah's Witnesses reported approximately 55 incidents, 21 of which took place in Moscow, in which authorities briefly detained their members or other citizens who were conducting lawful preaching activities.

In Vladimir Oblast, authorities inspected the property owned by the ROAC several times. In January 2006, FSB representatives seized about 20 files with documentation on ROAC ownership without informing ROAC leaders or giving any reasons.

As of now there are several religious prisoners including a Dutch man.

=== Forced religious conversion ===
There were no reports of forced religious conversion.

=== Antisemitism ===
Racially motivated violent attacks against Jews decreased during the reporting period, despite an increase in racist violence targeting other ethnic groups. Antisemitism remained a serious problem, and there were several antisemitic attacks on persons and synagogues during the reporting period.

In September 2006, a court convicted of attempted murder and of inciting ethnic and religious strife, and sentenced to 16 years in prison, a man who stabbed eight persons during evening prayers in the Chabad synagogue in Moscow in January 2006. The assailant did not deny that antisemitism was a motive in his attack. The courts increased the 13-year sentence he received in April 2006 because it had not taken into account the extremist motive of the attack.

A student attempted a copy-cat attack on a synagogue in Rostov-on-Don in January 2006, but security guards stopped him before he could harm anyone. An appeals court overturned his attempted murder conviction on the basis that he was mentally unfit to stand trial, and ordered him to undergo psychiatric treatment.

On October 1, 2005, 21-year-old Andrey Dzyuba was killed by a gang of drunken teenagers in Yekaterinburg. The group yelled antisemitic insults at Dzyuba, dragged him to a cemetery, beat him, and killed him with a metal cross grave marker. Courts convicted five of the attackers of murder for reason of ethnic hatred, and gave them sentences ranging from five to ten years in prison. Ten underage attackers who participated in the beating but not the murder were not charged due to their age.

According to the NGO Moscow Bureau of Human Rights (MBHR), the ultra-nationalist and antisemitic Russian National Unity (RNE) paramilitary organization continued to propagate hostility toward Jews and non-Orthodox Christians. The RNE appeared to have lost political influence in some regions since its peak in 1998, but the organization maintained high levels of activity in other regions, such as Voronezh.

Some branches of the ultra-nationalist and antisemitic National Sovereign Way of Russia (NDPR) participated in events organized by local officials.

The primary targets of skinheads were foreigners and individuals from the North Caucasus, but they expressed anti-Muslim and antisemitic sentiments as well.

Vandals desecrated several synagogues and Jewish community centers during the reporting period, including in Saratov, Lipetsk, Borovichy, Murmansk, Nizhniy Novgorod, Taganrog, Samara, Petrozavodsk, Perovo, Baltiisk, Kurgan, Khabarovsk, Vladivostok, Tomsk, and Kaliningrad. Officials often classified the crimes as "hooliganism." In the cases where local authorities prosecuted cases, courts generally imposed suspended sentences.

In May 2007 Dmitry Levanov firebombed the Jewish centre in Ulyanovsk and nailed a threatening note on its door with a knife. The next day he returned with a friend and threw a brick through its window. He was detained by police, tried in court, and given a 2-year suspended sentence for inciting ethnic hatred. His friend was released without being charged.

On 5 May 2007, an assailant threw a Molotov cocktail at a synagogue in Saratov. No suspects were apprehended. The police were investigating the arson as a case of "hooliganism" rather than as a hate crime. They stated it may not have been clear to the perpetrator that the building was a synagogue.

In the same town at the beginning of April 2007, a Jewish community member's home was targeted in an arson attack. Graffiti reading "kikes to Israel" was written on a fence near the synagogue. Police investigators also classified these incidents as hooliganism and had not detained any suspects as of May 2007.

On the night of March 18, 2007, vandals painted extremist phrases and swastikas on the walls of a synagogue in Voronezh. Officials initiated a criminal investigation on charges of vandalism and inciting extremist activity. The head of the Voronezh Jewish Community believed that the synagogue was attacked in response to the arrest of two young persons suspected of vandalizing a Jewish cemetery in Voronezh.

On the night of March 1, 2007, vandals desecrated a synagogue in Vladivostok and painted swastikas and antisemitic phrases on the walls of the synagogue. The synagogue was also vandalized on October 26, 2006.

On December 15, 2006, the Jewish Charity Centre in Pskov reported that pepper spray was sprayed through a keyhole during its Hanukkah celebration. Police found no evidence of an attack but agreed to step up patrols when the centre was having public events.

In September 2006 unidentified persons threw stones at synagogues in Khabarovsk and Astrakhan, breaking several windows. One perpetrator threw a Molotov cocktail at the Astrakhan synagogue during this attack.

Vandals also desecrated several Jewish cemeteries and memorials during the reporting period.

On March 30, 2007, unknown vandals defaced seven grave markers in a Jewish cemetery in St. Petersburg with swastikas and graffiti. Police were investigating.

On March 29, 2007, unknown vandals spray painted swastikas and fascist graffiti on a Holocaust memorial in Kaliningrad. The local Jewish community chairman asked the prosecutor to investigate.

On March 6, 2007, vandals desecrated a Jewish cemetery in Voronezh, ruining more than 20 tombstones. Officials initiated a criminal case under article 244 of the Criminal Code—desecrating a cemetery.

Charges of "hooliganism" were quite common for crimes that would normally be considered bias crimes against a particular community, but prosecutors, even by governmental opinion, were reluctant to pursue aggravated charges of racial bias in crimes and were many times content with the lesser charge being applied. At times, there was a fear of not being able to win a court judgement of a bias crime.

There were many reports of antisemitic publications during the reporting period.

A number of small, radical-nationalist newspapers that print antisemitic, anti-Muslim, and xenophobic articles, many of which appeared to violate the law against extremism, were readily available throughout the country. There were also reports of antisemitic literature on sale in cities across the country. The estimated number of xenophobic publications exceeded 100, many sponsored by the local chapters of the National Power Party. In addition, there were at least 80 websites in the country that disseminated antisemitic propaganda.

The Euro-Asian Congress noted that in 2006 prosecutors recorded the highest number of attempts to prosecute purveyors of antisemitic propaganda. While the Government has publicly denounced nationalist ideology and supported legal action against antisemitic acts, the reluctance of some lower-level officials to call such acts anything other than "hooliganism" remained an impediment.

In June 2007 a court in Novosibirsk sentenced the publisher of a local newspaper to two years in prison for inciting antisemitism. He had published articles that openly called for violence against Jews.

In April 2007, at a book fair in Moscow, police arrested a trader in extremist books and charged him with inciting ethnic, racial, and religious enmity. The police stated that they were seeking to identify the publisher of these materials.

Members of the State Duma and other prominent figures expressed antisemitic sentiments in a January 2005 letter, urging the prosecutor general to investigate Jewish organizations and initiate proceedings to ban them, charging that a Russian translation of ancient Jewish law, the Kitzur Shulchan Arukh, incited hatred against non-Jews. According to the ADL, in 2006 human rights organizations made numerous unsuccessful attempts to prosecute the authors of the "Letter of 500."

The Rodina party merged with the Russian Party of Life and the Party of Pensioners to form the new "For a Just Russia" party in 2006. Rodina members with known antisemitic views generally did not approve of the merger and did not join the new party. "For a Just Russia" was led by Federation Council Speaker Sergey Mironov, who frequently spoke out against intolerance and anti-Semitism, including at a September 2006 visit to the Babiy Yar memorial in Ukraine.

In 2006, Nikolay Kurianovich, an LDPR Duma deputy, initiated and publicized a "list of the enemies of the Russian people", which mostly featured Jewish names. On March 7, 2007, aides to Kurianovich were expelled from the Duma chambers for wearing swastika armbands. Kurianovich declared their expulsion part of a "struggle against all that is Russian."

=== Improvements and positive developments in respect for religious freedom ===
During the reporting period, President Putin spoke several times on the need to combat inter-ethnic and inter-religious intolerance. The ROC hosted the World Summit of Religious Leaders in July 2006, including 200 leaders from 40 countries. The conference focused on political and social issues and included calls for inter-religious tolerance. President Putin addressed the leaders and urged them to lead their congregations away from extremism.

On March 13, 2007, President Putin visited the Vatican and discussed with Pope Benedict XVI ways to improve relations between the ROC and Roman Catholic Church.

The LDS succeeded in registering 51 local religious organizations as of the end of 2006.

On December 12, 2006, a court affirmed the New Testament Church and the Perm Community of Evangelical Christians' title to the former Lenin Palace of Culture, providing an official certificate documenting the community's ownership of the facility, which they planned to use as a house of worship.

An Old Believer community in Samara regained its pre-Revolutionary church through a municipal decision during the reporting period.

Despite the prolonged series of investigations, Jehovah's Witness officials in St. Petersburg told consulate staff that the situation in Northwest Russia had improved. The officials said they had been able to engage in constructive dialogue with Government officials with regard to the general situation on religious freedom and the investigation of their Administrative Centre.

In November 2006, the Permskiy Kray court ruled in favour of the Pentecostal Church, allowing the church to register its property, overturning several previous lower court decisions against the group. The Pentecostal group reported having received no official harassment since the resolution of the case.

In February 2007 a Sverdlovsk oblast court convicted five teenagers of the 2005 murder of a Jewish man, sentencing them to prison sentences ranging from 5 to 10 years. The teens were skinheads and members of extremist and Nazi-affiliated groups. The court acknowledged the anti-Semitic nature of the crime in its verdict, which came under Article 105, Section 2, "Ethnic or Religious Hate Crime."

Federal and regional officials participated actively in, and in many cases strongly supported, a range of government and NGO-organized programs to promote tolerance. The December 2006 conference "A Multi-Ethnic Russia" was cosponsored by the Federation Council and UNESCO and included sessions on religious diversity and tolerance.

The Commission for Human Rights in the Russian Federation, a government body headed by Vladimir Lukin, released its annual report on human rights and publicized the difficulty that some religious groups faced in property restitution and land acquisition, and the difficulties that religious minorities faced with government officials.

The Public Chamber's Commission on Tolerance and Freedom of Conscience promoted tolerance in troubled areas, by holding a public hearing in March 2006 on how to promote stability and civil accord in the North Caucasus. Among the participants were government and religious leaders from the region.

Federal authorities, and in many cases regional and local authorities, facilitated the establishment of new Jewish institutions. In June 2006 work began on the construction of a $100 million Moscow Jewish community centre on land donated by the Moscow city government to house Jewish community institutions including a school, a hospital, and a major new museum devoted to the history of the country's Jews, the Holocaust, and tolerance. The construction was scheduled to be completed by the end of 2008.

Evangelical Christian leaders in St. Petersburg reported important progress in obtaining federal permission to expand work with prisoners, in particular through its broadcasting network. With the cooperation of the ROC, satellite receivers were installed in dozens of prisons to allow broadcasting of programming that was broadly Protestant but tried to reach across denominations. The prison broadcasting program's stated goal was to provide inmates with an alternative to mainstream television.

ROC Patriarch Aleksiy II and spiritual leaders of Russian Muslims held an interfaith appeal for peace and joint efforts to counter ethnic and religious strife, following inter-ethnic violence in the city of Kondopoga.

Despite the problems the Jehovah's Witnesses faced, church leaders said that their community grew by 3 percent (to 140,000) in the last year. Although in the past the Jehovah's Witnesses had difficulty securing large venues, they held an annual congress on July 14–16, 2006, at the Luzhniki Sports Complex in Moscow, which more than 22,000 attended. The April 2007 Jehovah's Witnesses' observances of the death of Jesus in Moscow proceeded without official or community disruption.

=== Yarovaya law ===
The Yarovaya law which was passed into law in 2016 has had a negative impact on religious freedom. A number of missionaries have been subject to arrest, convicted and fined for violating the law. Donald and Ruth Ossewaarde, independent missionaries working in Oryol, were fined 40,000 rubles (around $700), prompting the couple to leave the country; Sergei Zhuravlyov, a Ukrainian Reformed Orthodox Church of Christ representative, was arrested for engaging in preaching in St. Petersburg; and Ebenezer Tuah of Ghana, the leader of the Christ Embassy church, was arrested and fined 50,000 rubles for conducting baptisms at a sanatorium.

On 9 July 2016, Jim Mulcahy, a 72-year-old American pastor who is the Eastern European coordinator for the U.S.-based Metropolitan Community Church, was arrested and deported under the prohibition of missionary activities at non-religious sites, after advertising and holding a "tea party" in Samara with an LGBT group. Authorities had targeted Mulcahy under suspicions that he was planning to organize a same-sex wedding.

== Societal abuses and discrimination ==
Here were reports of societal abuses and discrimination based on religious belief or practice, including some physical attacks against individuals and communities because of the victims' religious affiliation (see also the section on Anti-Semitism). Groups that monitor hate crimes reported at least 70 incidents of vandalism against religious targets, including 36 aimed at Jews, 12 against Russian Orthodox, and 11 against Muslims.

On April 9, 2007, the Stavropol court charged a suspect with murder on religious hatred grounds for the September 2006 killing of Imam Kurdzhiyev.

In February 2007, police charged suspects in the June 2004 killing of Nikolay Girenko, an expert on xenophobia, racism, and anti-Semitism. Girenko had served for many years as an expert witness in trials involving alleged skinheads and neo-Nazis.

On December 8, 2006, a hand grenade was thrown into the yard of the house of Ismail Berdiyev, Chairman of the Coordinating Council of Moslems of the North Caucasus. No one was hurt in the attack.

Russian Orthodox priest Andrey Nikolayev, his wife, and their three children were killed on December 2, 2006, when their house was set on fire. The motive for the arson and murder was not known, but media reported that a criminal group had threatened the priest in the past and had burned down his house in another village.

According to Jehovah's Witness officials, there were 5 incidents of physical attacks on Jehovah's Witnesses, and 11 incidents of police detention in the first half of 2007. In 2006 there were 24 physical attacks and 40 cases of police detention.

Many citizens believe that at least nominal adherence to the ROC is a part of Russian culture, and three other faiths — Islam, Judaism, and Buddhism — are widely considered "traditional religions." Terrorism and events related to the war in Chechnya have given rise to negative popular attitudes toward traditionally Muslim ethnic groups in many regions. Hostility toward non-Russian-Orthodox religious groups sparked harassment and occasionally physical attacks. Religiously motivated violence continued, although it was often difficult to determine whether xenophobia, religion, or ethnic prejudices were the primary motivation. Conservative activists claiming ties to the ROC disseminated negative publications and staged demonstrations throughout the country against Roman Catholics, Protestants, Jehovah's Witnesses, and other minority religions.

Some religious groups participated in interfaith dialogues. Pentecostal and Baptist organizations, as well as the ROC, were reluctant to support ecumenism at the local level, although the national leaders engaged each other at public forums during the reporting period. At the international level, the ROC has traditionally pursued interfaith dialogue with other Christian groups. In the Muslim-dominated regions of the Tatarstan republic and the surrounding Volga region, tensions between Muslims and Russian Orthodox believers occasionally emerged. Law enforcement organizations closely watched Muslim groups. Officials often described Muslim charitable organizations as providing aid to extremists in addition to their overt charity.

A small splinter group of the ultra-nationalist Russian National Unity (RNE) organization called "Russian Rebirth" registered successfully in the past in Tver and Nizhniy Novgorod as a social organization, prompting protests from human rights groups; however, in several regions such as Moscow and Karelia, the authorities limited the activities of the RNE by denying registration to its local affiliates. According to Sova Center, there were neither registration denials nor registrations of RNE during the reporting period. Sova Centre reported that three other ultra-nationalist organizations were dissolved in 2006. In one case, the Supreme Court upheld the decision by a Krasnodar court to ban the Krasnodar Orthodox Slavic community, an Orthodox Old Believers group that used neo-Nazi symbols.

On July 2, 2006, 15 shots were fired over a 15-minute period at the Trinikolsky monastery in the Dmitrovsky District of the Moscow Oblast. While no one was injured, the shots caused $12,000 in damage.

On August 27, 2006, an unknown attacker sprayed teargas, disrupting a Pentecostal church service in the "New Testament" Evangelical Church in the city of Perm.

Muslims continued to encounter societal discrimination and antagonism in some regions. After terrorists associated with Chechen, Ingush, and Islamic extremists seized a school in 2004 in Beslan, North Ossetia, interethnic and interreligious tensions resulting in discrimination persisted in the region without the authorities' intervention, according to NGOs. Muslims claimed that citizens in certain regions feared Muslims, citing cases such as a dispute in Kolomna, approximately 60 miles (97 km) southeast of Moscow, over the proposed construction of a mosque. Government officials, journalists, and the public have liberally labelled Muslim organizations "Wahhabi", a term that has become equivalent with "extremist." Numerous press reports documented anti-Islamic sentiment.

In Muslim-dominated regions, relations between Muslims and Russian Orthodox believers were generally harmonious. Extremely traditional or orthodox versions of Islam were often associated in the public mind with terrorism and radical Muslim fighters in the North Caucasus.

Although the previous reporting period saw the chairman of the Council of Muftis, the head of the Central Spiritual Board of the country's Muslims, and the head of the Coordinating Centre of Muslims of the North Caucasus jointly denounce terrorism, the national press carried stories during the reporting period highlighting their public differences in attitudes toward Wahabbism, among other things.

As in the past, there were many attacks against houses of worship, meeting halls, and cemeteries across the country. Attacks ranged from threats and graffiti to arson. Often, even in the face of blatant anti-religious signs, local authorities investigated the cases as "hooliganism", and not under the stronger anti-hate laws, although there were signs that prosecutors were using the hate-crime laws more often. In April 2007 the Government amended the Criminal Code to increase punitive measures for hate crimes and extremism. According to new legislation, an individual convicted of committing an act of vandalism motivated by ideological, political, national, racial and religious hatred or enmity can be sentenced for up to 3 years.

Sova Centre reported that 25 acts of vandalism motivated by religious hatred were committed against churches and other religious buildings in 2006, including 11 attacks on Muslim religious buildings. A mosque was bombed in Yahroma village of Moscow region. Mosques in Vladimir and Yaroslavl were attacked with Molotov cocktails.

On September 27, 2006, arsonists attempted to burn down a mosque in Yaroslavl by throwing six Molotov cocktails at the building. Vandals painted extremist phrases and swastikas on the outer wall of the mosque. Police arrested and charged an 18-year-old student with instigation of nationalist, racial, and religious hatred. There was another attempt of arson on the same mosque 3 days earlier. On December 25, 2006, the arsonists were convicted of desecration and arson; one was given a suspended sentence of 1 year and 3 months, and the other was sentenced to 10 months in a labour camp. The arsonists apologized publicly.

Emmanuel Moscow Evangelical Church reported an arson attack on their building in Solntsevo district of Moscow on the night of March 26, 2007. Also in March 2007, attackers threw bottles filled with resin at the front wall of Central Prayer House of the Christians of Evangelical Faith in Voronezh.

Sova Center registered 24 cases of vandalism in Orthodox, Muslim, and Jewish cemeteries in 2006. On October 3, 2006, a group of skinheads desecrated approximately 150 Jewish and Tatar tombs in a cemetery in Tver. Extremist leaflets were found at the scene. A criminal case was initiated on charges of desecrating a cemetery.

On August 4, 2006, a Muslim cemetery was vandalized in Yekaterinburg. More than a dozen headstones, many of them of historic value, were destroyed. Police characterized the vandalism as hooliganism, not a hate crime, and Muslim community representatives in Yekaterinburg, including Imam Sibgatulla-Hazrat, agreed with this view.

During the reporting period, the tensions between the Vatican and the ROC notably decreased, although the Patriarchy in Moscow continued to object to the transfer of the Ukrainian Greek-Catholic See from Lviv to Kyiv, Ukraine, which occurred in August 2005. The press coverage of President Putin's March 2007 meeting with Pope Benedict XVI was positive, and Roman Catholic representatives noted a decrease in tensions during the reporting period. Other issues of concern that remained between the two groups included the continued belief that Roman Catholics were proselytizing in the country and a proposal by a local priest to open a Catholic Carmelite convent whose main mission would be to work with orphans in the city of Nizhniy Novgorod. The ROC alleged that the convent would serve as a base for missionary activities, while the Catholic Church maintained that the convent was not a full-fledged convent but a means for caring for local orphans. In April 2007 the Head of the ROC's Inter-Christian Relations Secretariat publicly criticized the Catholic Church for allegedly proselytizing at orphanages, calling their missionary activity "unacceptable."

Reports of the harassment of evangelicals and Pentecostals dramatically decreased during the reporting period, particularly after September 2005, when Bishop Sergey Ryakhovskiy joined the Public Chamber. Nevertheless, African-Russian and African ministers of non-Orthodox Christian churches were subject to religious and racial bigotry.

According to a July 13, 2006, report by SOVA, an Orthodox priest and other activists attempted to interrupt a Baptist service in the village of Achit (Sverdlovsk region). They reportedly told persons walking by that the Baptists were a dangerous "sect." Police arrived on the scene and fined the Baptists for holding an "unauthorized meeting." Similar actions were reported against Pentecostals and Hare Krishnas.

The press routinely continued to reference members of Jehovah's Witnesses as a religious "sect", although they have been present in the country for approximately 100 years.

In the past, Jehovah's Witnesses officials reported physical attacks against their members throughout the country. The officials were unable to update these figures for this reporting period, citing the difficulty of collecting the information.

A case at the ECHR continued 4 years after a provocative exhibit on religion was vandalized at the Sakharov Center. Although the authorities never prosecuted the vandals, a court found the Center Director and a staff member guilty of inciting religious hatred, and fined them. The case was being appealed at the ECHR.

During the reporting period, the Slavic Center for Law and Justice and a number of minority "nontraditional" religious leaders asserted that the Government and majority religious groups increasingly used the mass media, conferences, and public demonstrations to foment opposition to minority religions as threats to physical, mental, and spiritual health, asserting that these groups threatened national security. During the reporting period, television channels broadcast several programs about "dangerous cults and sects" and implied that these included Pentecostals and other proselytizing religions.

== See also ==
- Religion in Russia
- Yarovaya law (Anti proselytism law)
- Human rights in Russia
- Freedom of assembly in Russia
- Media freedom in Russia
- Russian Church property restitution
