= Unity Christian Music Festival =

Music festival

- Status: active
- Genre: music festival
- Frequency: Annually
- Location: Muskegon, Michigan
- Coordinates: 43°14′03″N 86°14′54″W
- Country: United States
- Website: www.unitymusicfestival.com

Unity Christian Music Festival (Unity) is a four-day Christian music festival held annually during the month of August at Heritage Landing in Muskegon, Michigan.

Unity was started in 2001 to bring Christians together for public praise, worship and fellowship; to provide a wholesome, family valued entertainment alternative and to raise funds and recruit volunteers for area Christian ministries. The Festival is presented by Alive on the Lakeshore, an all volunteer group of local Christians who want to present wholesome, Christ centered, family valued entertainment options in West Michigan. Each year, 700 volunteers are part of the festival. The festival is a member of the Christian Festival Association.

Average per day attendance ranges from 9,000 on Thursday to over 20,000 on Saturday. Artists who have played at Unity include Relient K, Hawk Nelson, Anointed, Steven Curtis Chapman, Geoff Moore, Petra, Chris Rice, Phil Keaggy, Mark Schultz, Jars of Clay, tobyMac, The Newsboys, 4th Point, Chris Tomlin and Michael W. Smith.

In the past, Unity's parent organization Alive on the Lakeshore presented a smaller festival called Rock the Coast at Michigan's Adventure amusement park.

The 20th festival was deferred to 2021 as officials blamed the COVID-19 pandemic as grounds for 2020's cancellation.
