= Kingdom Bound =

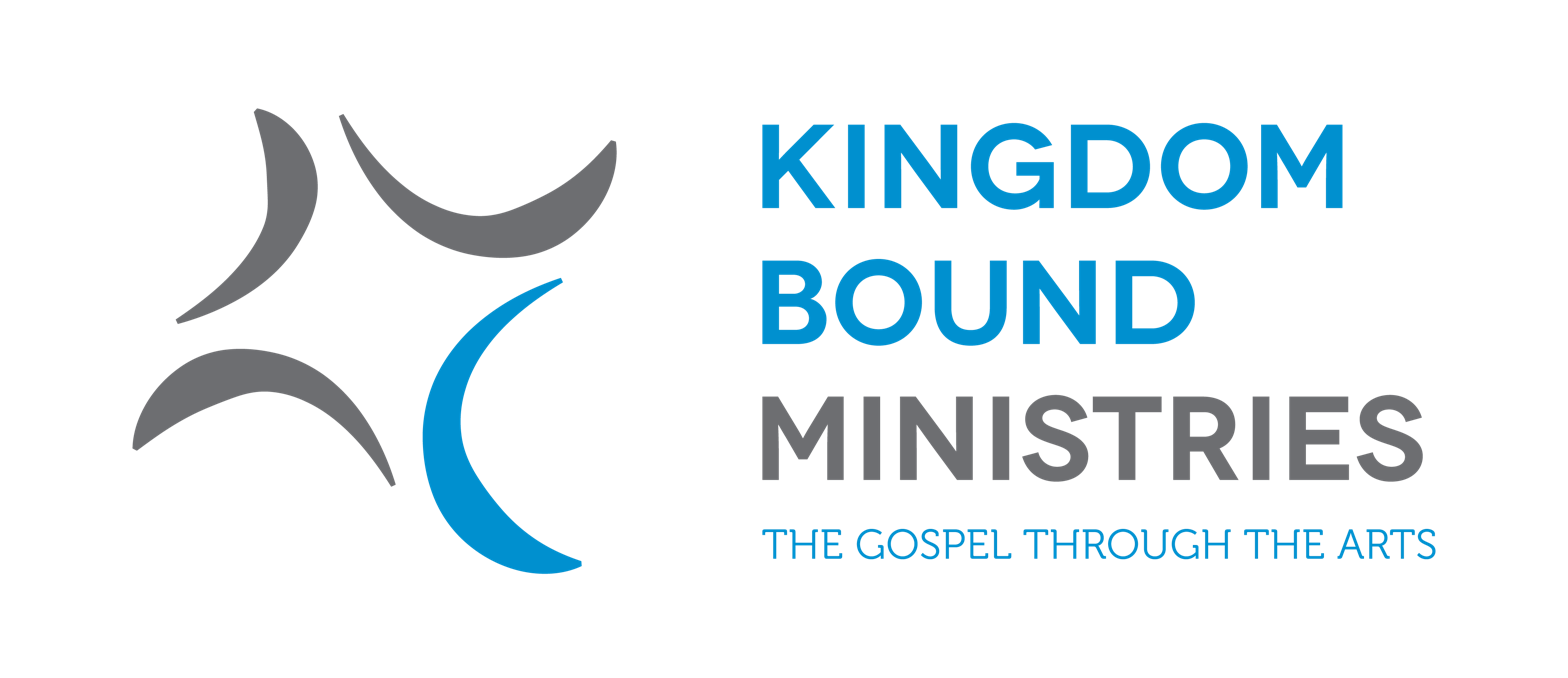
- The Gospel Through The Arts
- Genre: Contemporary Christian music
- Dates: July 27 - 29, 2026
- Locations: Darien Lake Theme Park Resort: Darien Center, NY 14040, United States
- Years active: 1986 to present
- Founders: Fred Caserta and Mike Caputy
- Organizer: Kingdom Bound Ministries
- Website: kingdombound.org

Kingdom Bound is an annual Christian music festival held at Darien Lake Theme Park Resort near Buffalo, New York. The festival takes place over a span of three days and has hosted a variety of Christian speakers and artists since the late 1980s.

== History ==
Kingdom Bound started out as an idea by two locals from Buffalo, New York, Fred Caserta, a booking agent and concert promoter, and Mike Caputy, a local musician.

1980s- In 1986, Caserta and Caputy presented a concert featuring Christian artists Sheila Walsh, Russ Taff, and Mylon LeFevre. Following this concert, Caserta and Caputy were approached by Kevin Ketcham, who, at the time, was the special events coordinator for Darien Lake Theme Park, located halfway between Buffalo and Rochester, New York. Ketcham presented them with an idea of holding a Christian music day at the theme park, and in October 1987, the Kingdom Bound festival made its debut. Despite chilly, 39 degree atmosphere, approximately 6,000 people showed up to hear the variety of Christian artists and speakers that Caserta and Caputy had put together. The following year, in 1988, the festival was moved from October to the end of August, where it would remain for the next twelve years.

1990s- In 1992, despite heavy rains from Hurricane Andrew, the Kingdom Bound festival was not cancelled. Many still attended the rain soaked event and to this day, the incident became lovingly known among patrons and staff as “Mudfest”. The following year saw a first for the festival when Kingdom Bound booked three headliners: Newsboys, dc Talk, and Steven Curtis Chapman. With festival attendance and popularity growing at an incredible rate, Kingdom Bound began booking concerts year round in different cities, bringing in different Christian artists such as Steve Green and 4Him.

2000s-Upon entering the new millennium, Kingdom Bound was moved from Wednesday through Saturday in late August, to Sunday to Wednesday at the beginning of August. The new era also saw the beginning of Kingdom Bound’s website, www.kingdombound.org. In 2004, Kingdom Bound welcomed Enemy Opposition, a ministry that uses BMX, inline skating, and skateboarding to present the gospel, to the festival In 2008, Kingdom Bound Ministries partnered with CMS Productions to bring the Christian Music Summit to Buffalo.

== Artists/speakers ==
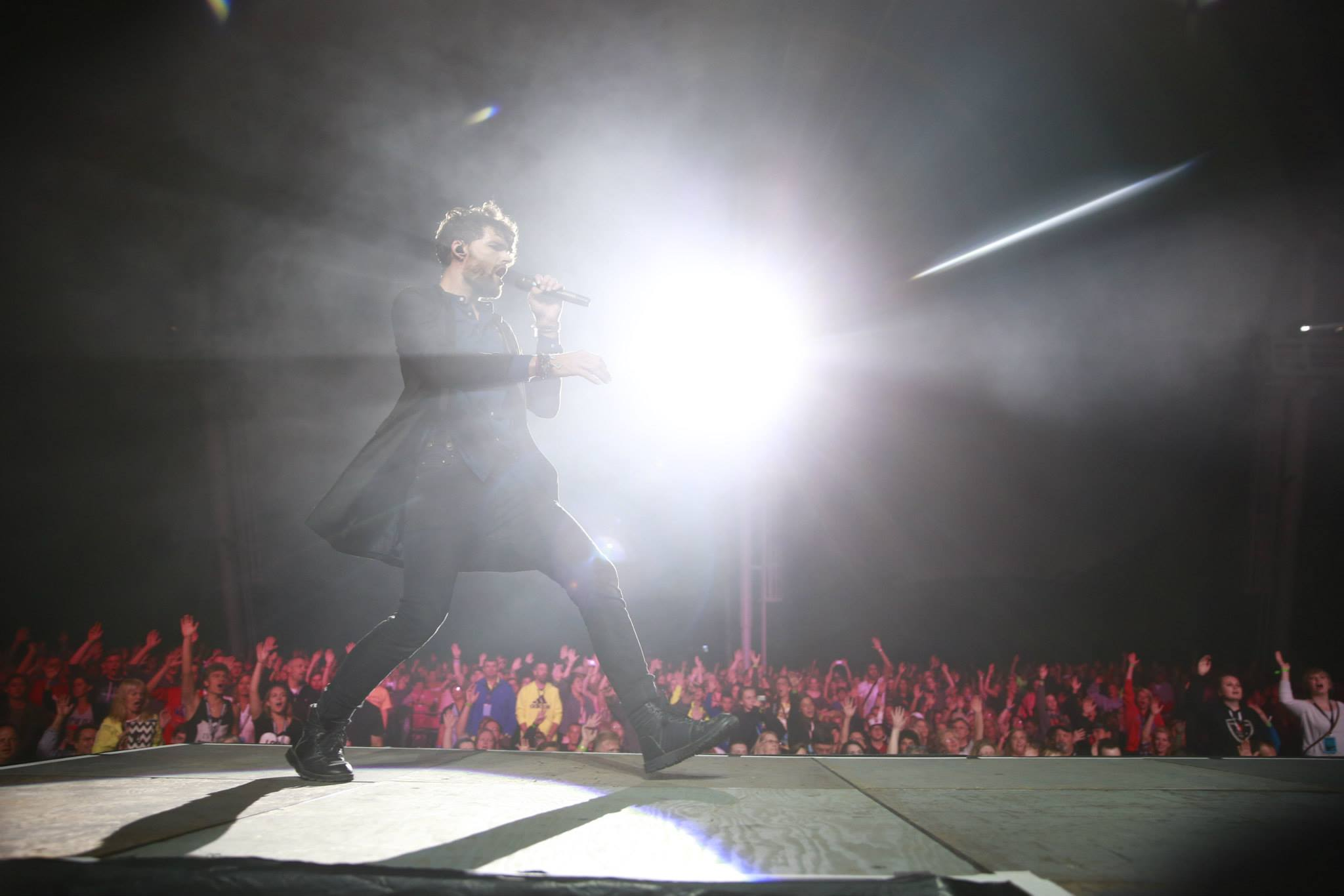
for King & Country performing at Kingdom Bound 2015

Artists have included- Michael W. Smith, Paul Baloche, Rebecca St. James, Skillet, Relient K, Jeremy Camp, Nicole C. Mullen, Kutless, Pillar, Casting Crowns, MercyMe, TobyMac, Chris Tomlin, Third Day, Thousand Foot Krutch, David Crowder Band, Seventh Day Slumber, Lecrae, Newsboys, Hillsong United, OC Supertones, Insyderz, Family Force 5 (aka the Brothers), Superchic[k], Hello Kelly, Manic Drive, MXPX, Delirious, Audio Adrenaline, Hawk Nelson, Kids in the Way, Icon for Hire, Project 86, Spoken, Nevertheless, Five Iron Frenzy, RED, and Carman.

Speakers have included- Jake the Snake Roberts, Jay Bakker, Frank Reich of the Buffalo Bills, Jill Kelly, actors Kirk Cameron and Stephen Baldwin, Dr. Kevin Leman, columnist Cal Thomas, Nick Vujicic, and Wes Aarum.

== Activities ==
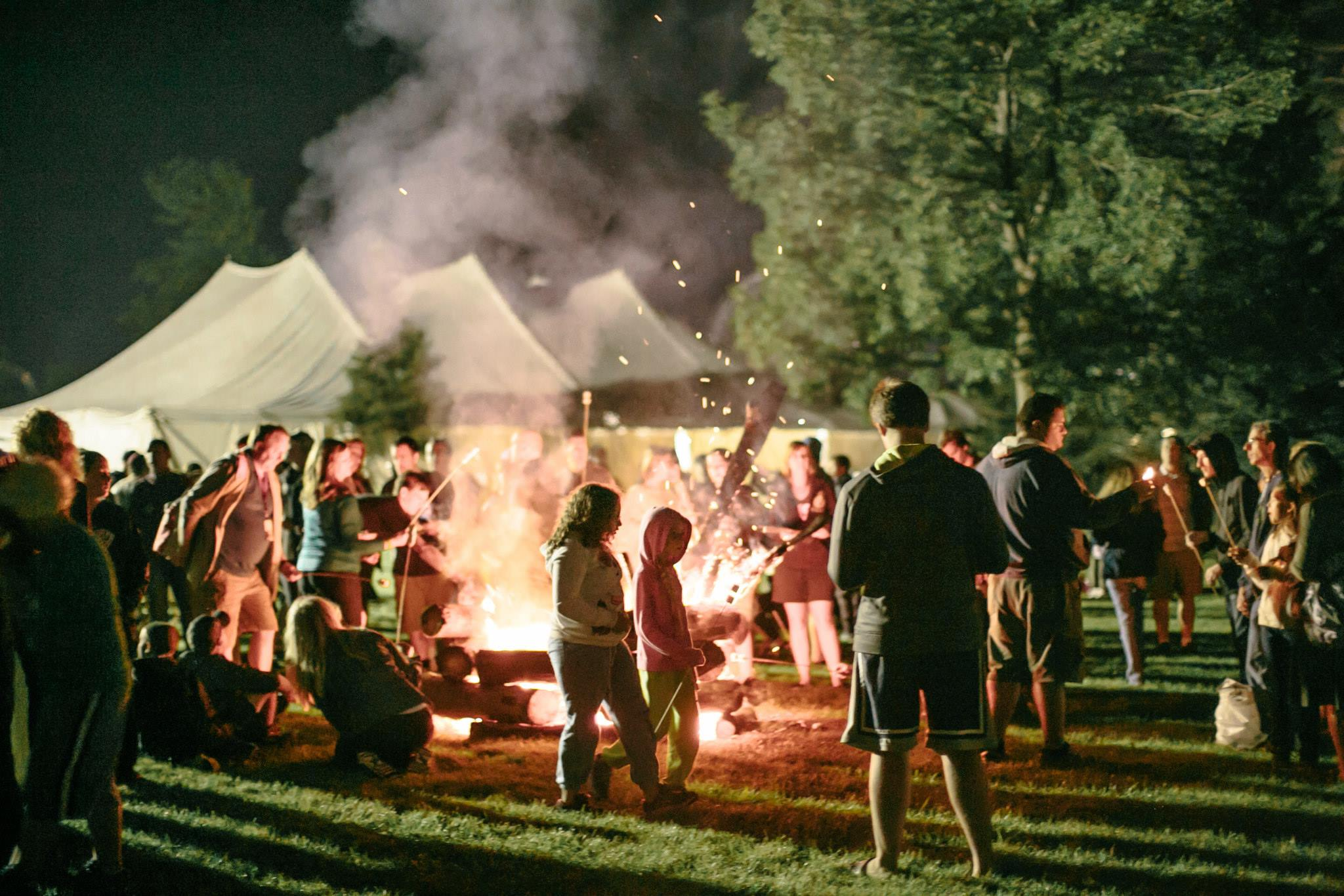
The annual Late Night Bonfire in the Darien Lake Campground

Along with the various Christian speakers and artists, Kingdom Bound has worked hard to provide different activities for its patrons. For example, in the summer of 1996, the festival offered activities such as “Rave in the Cafe”, a single’s coffee house, and nightly Bible studies with Rochester’s Pastor Samme Palermo and in 2014, Kingdom Bound invited artist Tony Goodwin to teach Art & Soul Workshops during the festival. Over the years, the festival has offered, and continues to offer, daily seminars throughout the event, as well as activities specifically geared towards youth such as KB Kidz, geared toward 4-8 year olds, and AMPED for 9-13 year olds. Not only are patrons encouraged to enjoy the activities, but the KB Marketplace as well, which contains a variety of Christian vendors and giveaways.

== Stages ==
Darien Lake Amphitheatre (The PAC)

The Darien Lake Amphitheatre, or “PAC”, took shape in 1993 when for the first time in KB history, the festival booked three headliners. This stage serves as the main stage and continues to be where the headliners play during the festival. Artists that have performed here include TobyMac, Skillet, Mandisa, for King & Country, and Michael W. Smith

The AWAKEN Stage (The Park Stage)

Known as the “place for interactivity”, this stage plays host to a variety of acts such as teachings, skits, games, and hard rock or hip-hop Christian artists. Artists that have performed on this stage include RED, Manic Drive, Red Jumpsuit Apparatus, KB, Social Club and many others.

Worship Tent:

Added in 1989, this stage has been called “The heart of Kingdom Bound Summer Festival”. Located next to the campground, this tent offers teachings, music, and worship from morning to night all throughout the festival. Worship artists such as Paul Baloche, Robin Mark, Brothers McClurg and Rend Collective have performed on this stage.

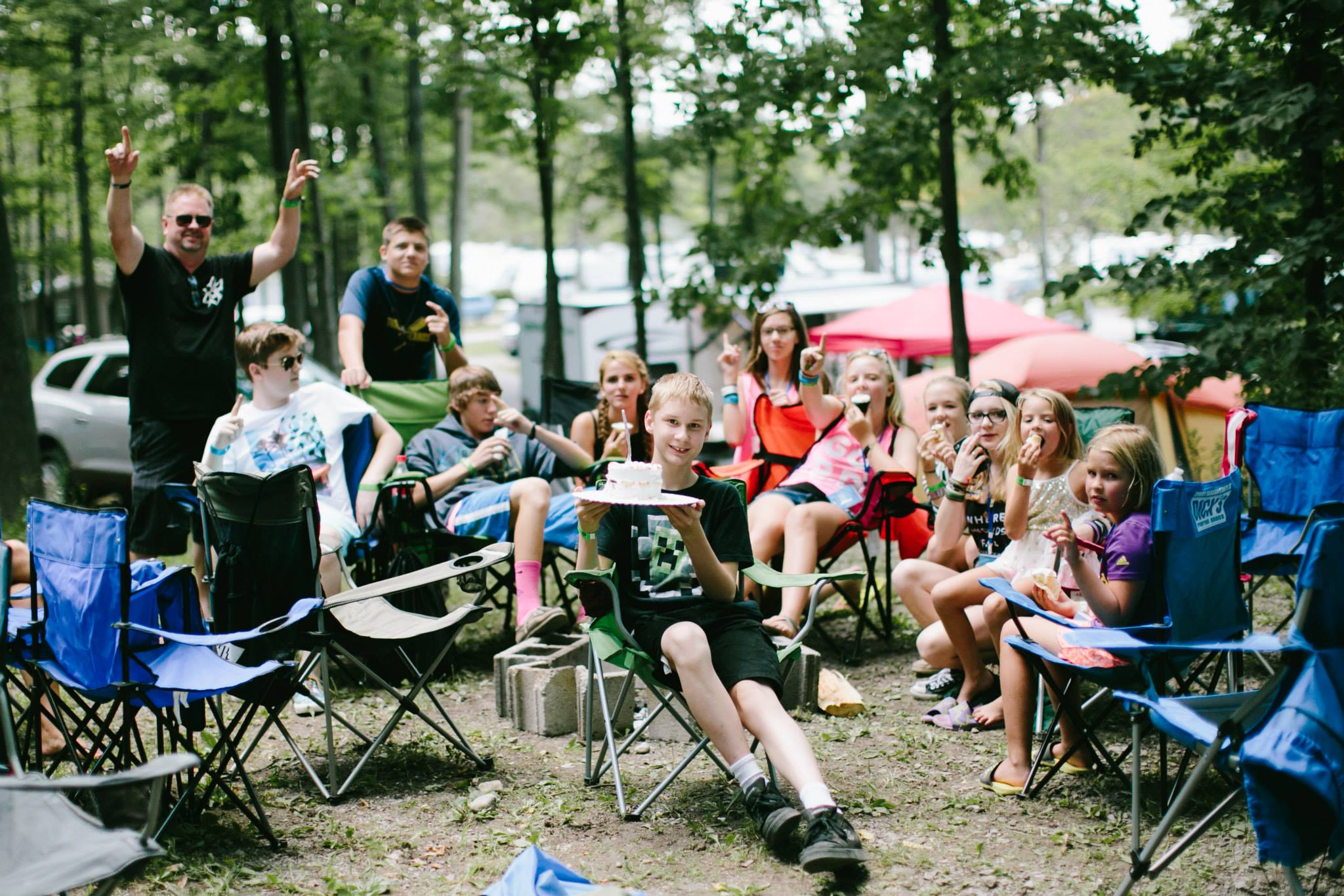
Camping at Kingdom Bound

Camping/hotels:

During the festival, Kingdom Bound offers all those attending the festival the chance to stay in the Darien Lake Theme Park Resort. Those attending can also choose to rent a lodge by the lake, rent a cabin, or a bunk house. Patrons are also allowed bring their own trailer/hookup, or choose to camp out in a tent with the campsite rental option.
