= Christian Festival Association =

The Christian Festival Association was formed in September 2006. The group consists of members representing major Christian music festivals held in the United States and Canada. Collectively, this group represents nearly a million attendees annually, whose events are held between April and October each year. The association's Executive Director is Julie Klinger and the organization is headquartered in Sioux Falls, South Dakota.

== Member festivals ==
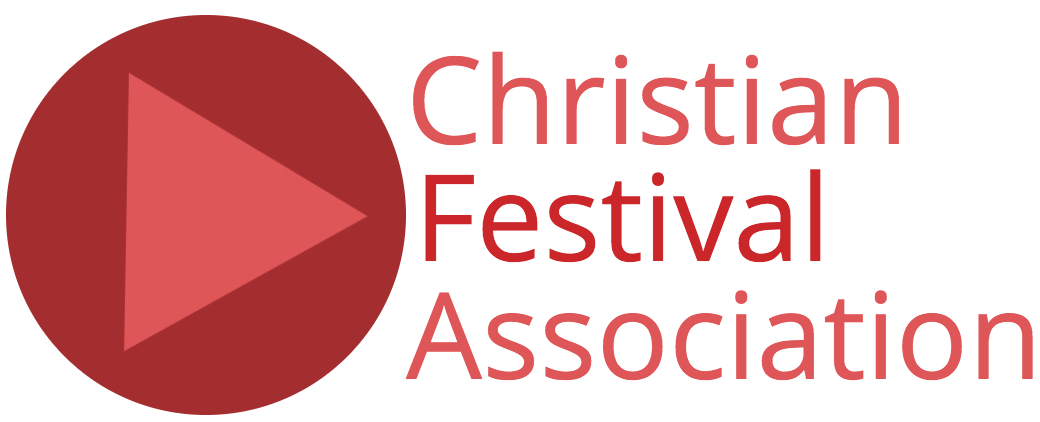
Christian Festival Association Logo

The members of the CFA include:

- Kingdom Bound – Darien Center, New York
- Lifest – Oshkosh, Wisconsin
- Amplify Fest - Arkansas
- Connect Festivals - New England
- FaithFest - North Carolina
- GraceFest - California
- Hillfest - New Hampshire
- LifeLight Hills Alive – South Dakota
- LifeLight – South Dakota
- Light the Way - Olive Branch
- Light the Way - Thunder Ridge
- Livin' Out Loud - Nebraska
- OneFest - Wisconsin
- Off the Charts - North Dakota
- Palau Festivals - Nationwide
- Resound Festival - Missouri
- RiseFest - Iowa
- RURAL Music Fest - Minnesota
- Rock The Smokies - Tennessee
- SonRise Music Festival - Virginia
- ThriveFest - Minnesota
- UnityFest - North Carolina
- Uprise Festival - Pennsylvania
- Unity Christian Music Festival – Muskegon, Michigan
