= LifeLight Communications =

- Formation: 1998
- Founder: Alan and Vicki Greene
- Type: Non-profit Ministry
- Headquarters: Sioux Falls, South Dakota
- Website: https://lifelight.org

LifeLight Communications is a non-profit ministry based in Sioux Falls, South Dakota dedicated to taking the church outside of the walls through tours & concerts, student ministries, missions, radio, outreach events and festivals. The best known aspect of their ministry is the LifeLight Music Festival, a free, annual Christian Music Festival held over Labor Day weekend in Worthing, South Dakota.

== History ==
LifeLight Communications was founded in 1998 by Alan and Vicki Greene. It started with the first LifeLight Festival which was held on a local church lawn. By 2001, the Greenes decided to pursue full-time ministry. The term LifeLight was taken from the Bible verse John 8:12-Jesus said, "I am the light of the world. Whoever follows me will not walk in darkness but have the Light of Life."

== Mission ==
The mission of LifeLight Communications is to take the church outside the walls by uniting churches and ministries together to achieve the three main goals of their ministry, "Reaching", "Raising" and "Sending" people locally and internationally to receive and advance the gospel.

== Ministries ==
=== Festivals ===
The annual LifeLight Music Festival is the best known aspect of the ministry. It started on a local church lawn in 1998 then moved to the W.H. Lyon Fairgrounds in 2001. It outgrew the Fairgrounds and moved to Wild Water West in 2005. In 2010, it moved to a permanent home located on farmland near Worthing, South Dakota and hosted an estimated 300,000 people during the three days of the festival. The LifeLight model has expanded with a new 1 day festival in Bethany, Missouri and four festivals and two pastors conferences hosted in April 2010 in Karachi & Hyderabad, Pakistan.

=== Tours/Concerts ===
LifeLight tours began in 2005 when people began asking for more music between festivals. It started out with local artists mainly traveling to local cities. Now, LifeLight Tours has partnered with several national and regional bands/speakers and travels well beyond the Midwest for tour dates.

=== Missions ===
The LifeLight founders took their family on a mission trip to Juarez, Mexico and have been dedicated to taking mission trips around the world ever since. They state that missions is the core of the ministry and the purpose of their mission trips is to evangelize the lost, disciple the saved, and encourage the existing churches & missionaries around the world. They have returned to Mexico multiple times since 1998 and have taken trips to the Rosebud Indian Reservation and most recently, Pakistan. They have partnered with Mission Haiti and Food for the Hungry and done work in Haiti, Ethiopia & Bangladesh and have adopted villages in Zewey & Belo, Ethiopia.

=== Radio ===
LifeLight Radio is a weekly half-hour radio show during which Alan and Vicki (or a special guest) address topics in a real and relevant way from a Biblical perspective. It can be heard on a local radio station or online.
