= Join in the Sound =

Studio album by Brothers McClurg
- Released: July 31, 2012
- Genres: Worship, Gospel, Folk, Rock, CCM, Christian rock, Christian alternative rock, southern gospel, roots rock, folk rock
- Length: 61:22
- Label: Integrity
- Producers: Anthony Hoisington, Chris Hoisington, Joseph Secchiaroli

Join in the Sound is the first studio album from Brothers McClurg. Integrity Music released the album on July 31, 2012. They worked with Joseph Secchiaroli, in the production of this album.

== Critical reception ==
Professional ratings
Review scores
Source	Rating
Cross Rhythms	8/10 squares
Louder Than the Music	4/5 stars
New Release Today	4/5 stars
Worship Leader	5/5 stars

Awarding the album five stars for Worship Leader, Jeremy Armstrong states, "this band of brothers mixed passion and creativity with their powerful devotional songwriting chops to offer one of the best debut releases this year." Brendan O'Regan, rating the album an eight out of ten from Cross Rhythms, writes, "the lyrics are well crafted and one is left with a thoroughly engaging album". Giving the album four stars at New Release Today, Mary Nikkel says, "The songs are framed by strong, smooth vocals, mellow guitar work, and songwriting that is powerful in its simplicity." Jono Davies, indicating in a four star review by Louder Than the Music, describes, "the album is very relaxed, it's something to put on during a nice evening in front of the fire with a book."

== Track listing ==
No.	Title	Writer(s)	Length
1.	"Tune Up"	Anthony Hoisington, Chris Hoisington, Glenn Packiam	0:48
2.	"Join in the Sound"	Hoisington, Hoisington, Packiam	4:27
3.	"I Believe in Hope"	Hoisington, Hoisington, Don Poythress, Anthony Skinner	4:27
4.	"You Shine Through"	Gareth Gilkerson, Hoisington, Hoisington, Chris Llewellyn	5:34
5.	"From Every Stormy Wind That Blows"	Thomas Hastings, Hoisington, Hoisington, Hugh Stowell	3:26
6.	"Forgiven Forever"	Carl Cartee, Packiam	5:22
7.	"Come to the Fount"	Hoisington, Hoisington	6:24
8.	"All Around"	Mia Fieldes, Hoisington, Hoisington	4:06
9.	"Lean Not"	Hoisington, Hoisington, Leslie Jordan, David Leonard	5:42
10.	"I Just Need You"	Hoisington, Hoisington	5:57
11.	"Caught in the Moment"	Hoisington, Hoisington, Poythress, Tony Wood	4:13
12.	"Alive"	Hoisington, Hoisington, Jordan, Leonard	3:54
13.	"Living Water"	David Lunsford	3:09
14.	"Just Say"	Paul Baloche, Hoisington, Hoisington	3:53
Total length:			61:22

== Chart performance ==
Chart (2012)	Peak position
US Top Christian Albums (Billboard)	36
US Heatseekers Albums (Billboard)	22
