= Law on Freedom of Conscience and Religious Associations =

The Law on Freedom of Conscience and Religious Associations (Russian: «Закон О свободе совести и о религиозных объединениях»), also known as the 1997 Law (Russian: «Закон 1997 года») is a Russian law passed and signed by President Boris Yeltsin on September 26, 1997.

The law redefined the state's relationship with religion, as the USSR president Mikhail Gorbachev had defined in on the Law of the Russian Soviet Federative Socialist Republic on Freedom of Worship passed on October 25, 1990, commonly known as the 1990 Law. After the fall of Communism, Gorbachev had given much-needed breathing room to the practice of religion in Russia, whose culture's heart is Eastern Orthodoxy, but had also opened the door indiscriminately and generally to the practice of religion. The Russian Orthodox Church believed that a new law was needed to preserve Russia against what they considered to be the corruption of Orthodoxy.

The law was formulated and pushed by the Russian Orthodox Church, secular nationalists, and communists alike, with such determination that though Yeltsin vetoed the bill once, he could not legitimately do so a second time.

Written in the law was the upholding of separation of church and state, as well as an interdiction against a state religion. With that in mind, the following definitions and regulations are given:

== Definitions ==
- religious organizations: at the level of individual church congregations
- religious associations: whole denominations
- religious groups: groups without legal status, such as a bible study group

== Regulations ==
- Organizations may only be founded by Russian citizens

this ostensibly provided for national security.

- All associations must have a religious purpose, including:
  - a creed,
  - regular worship services,
  - the conducting of religious education.

aimed at para-church organizations such as Campus Crusade for Christ and the Salvation Army.

- No organization may function until they have been registered with the government for 15 years, unless it affiliates with an existing association. During the wait, the following is forbidden:
  - public worship services,
  - distribution of literature and materials,
  - the hiring of foreign clergy.

this discouraged independent-style and evangelical churches such as Baptists.

- A religious group may be liquidated by the government for any of the following reasons:
  - creating an armed militia unit,
  - threatening the integrity of the Russian Federation,
  - infringing on the health of its citizens,
  - restricting its members from leaving the religion,
  - encouraging its members to disobey civic duties.

== Effects ==
Religion under the new law became nearly as regulated as it had been in Soviet times, though without the official communist hostility. It did accomplish some expulsion of Western religious work, though it left room for some foreign churches to legitimately register. There had been on the order of 16,000 registered organizations before the passage of the law, and by 2004 there were 22,000. By regulating on grounds common among new, foreign organizations, it made it difficult for them to take root, and it succeeded in promoting and securing a privileged place for the Russian Orthodox Church.

On June 22, 2005, debate of the Parliamentary Assembly of the Council of Europe (PACE) concluded, that the 1997 Law "creates a complex form of categorization of religions which has led to various forms of discrimination and to the stigmatization of 'non-traditional' religions."

== See also ==
- Law of the Russian Federation
- Orthodoxy, Autocracy, and Nationality
- Freedom of Religion
- Separation of Church and State
