= Brothers McClurg =

- Origin: Buffalo, New York
- Genres: Worship, Gospel, Folk, Rock, CCM, Christian rock, Christian alternative rock, southern gospel, roots rock, folk rock
- Years active: 2008–present
- Label: Integrity
- Members: Anthony Hoisington; Chris Hoisington; Jeremy Thompson
- Past members: Matt Poulsen; Justin Michau; Peter Bordin; Ed Chilungu; Dan Swain
- Website: brothersmcclurg.com

Brothers McClurg is an American Christian music brother duo from Buffalo, New York. They started making music in 2008, with their first studio album, Join in the Sound, released in 2012, with Integrity Music. This album was their breakthrough release upon the Billboard magazine charts, where it placed on two of them the Christian Albums and Heatseekers Albums.

== Background ==
The Brothers McClurg took their name from their maternal grandfather, who was a pastor, Bill McClurg, while he is the musical impetus for the family and his children, Bill Jr., Martha and Mary, and his grandchildren, Anthony and Chris Hoisington. The brothers started making music in 2008, in the Buffalo, New York-area, where they caught the attention of a major Christian music record label.

== Music history ==
The brother duo started as a musical entity in 2008, with their first studio album, Join in the Sound, that was released on July 31, 2012, from Integrity Music. This album was their breakthrough release upon the Billboard magazine charts, where it peaked at No. 36 on the Christian Albums and at No. 22 on the Heatseekers Albums charts.

== Members ==
- Anthony Craig Hoisington
- Christopher Lucas Hoisington
- Jeremy Thompson
- Matt Poulsen (guitar)
- Dan Swain (bass)
- Justin Michau (guitar)
- Peter Bordin (drums)

== Discography ==
Albums

List of Albums, with selected chart positions
Title	Album details	Peak chart positions	
Title	Album details	US CHR	US Heat
Join in the Sound	Released: July 31, 2012; Label: Integrity; CD, digital download	36	22
