= Rosreestr =

Federal Service for State Registration, Cadastre and Cartography
- Федеральная служба государственной регистрации, кадастра и картографии
- Agency seal

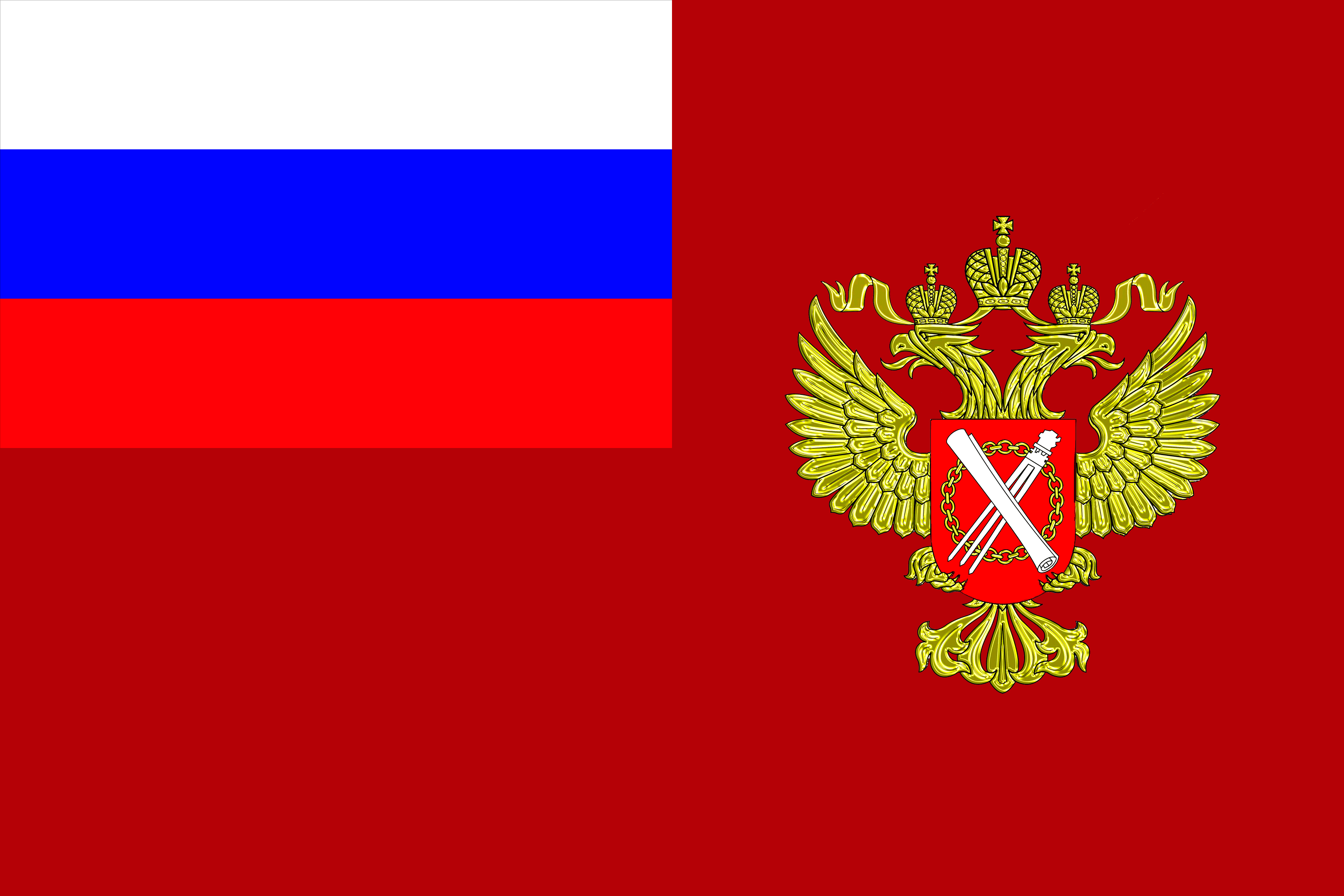
- Agency flag

- Digital emblem

Agency overview
- Formed: 9 March 2004
- Preceding agencies: Federal Agency for Geodesy and Cartography (Roskartografiya); Federal Real Estate Cadastre Agency (Rosnedvizhimost)
- Jurisdiction: Government of Russia
- Headquarters: Chistoprudny Boulevard 6/19, Moscow; 55°45′49.3″N 37°38′23.4″E
- Agency executive: Oleg Skufinsky, Director
- Parent agency: Government of Russia
- Website: rosreestr.gov.ru Building details
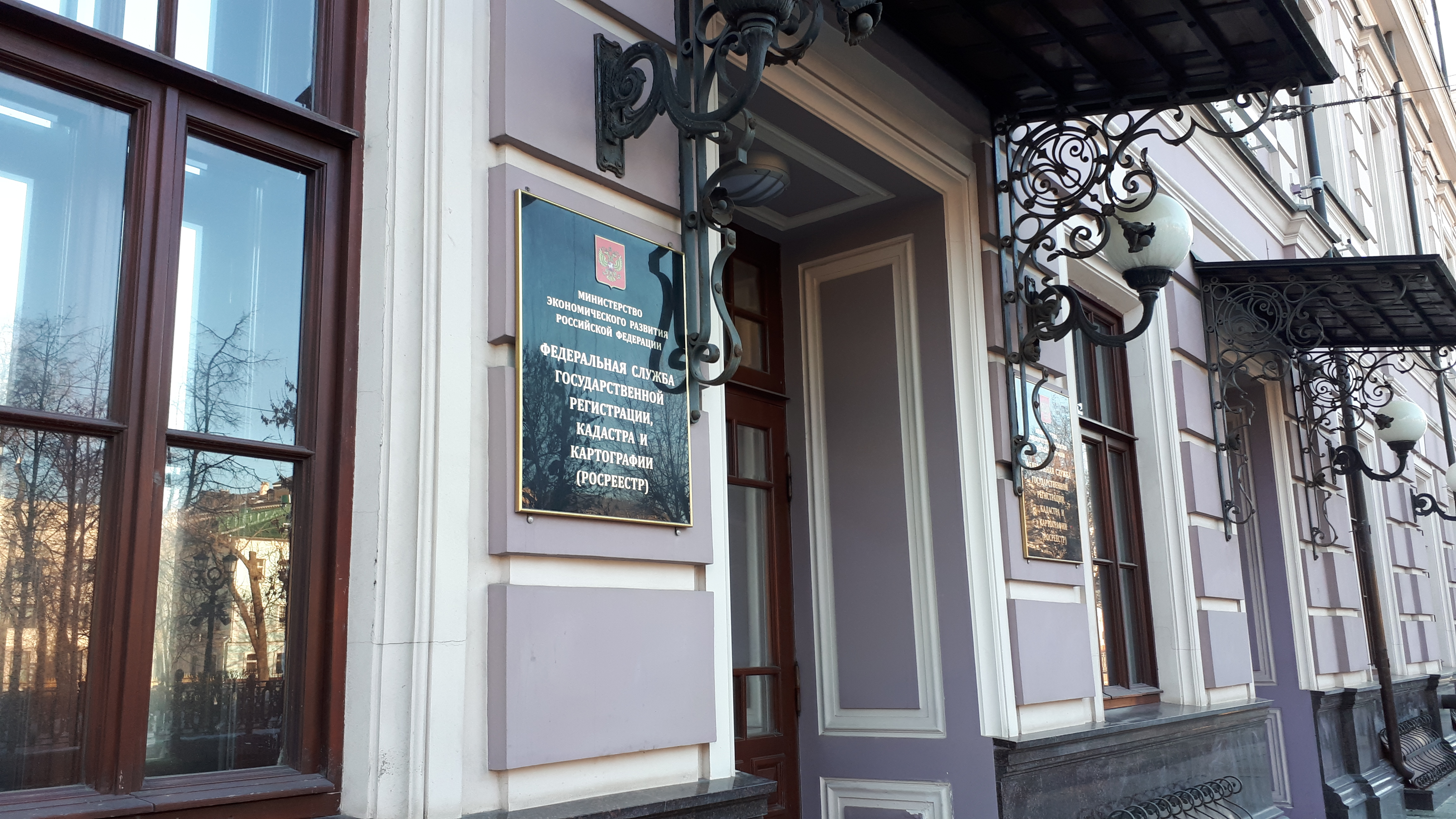
- Headquarters of the agency in Moscow

The Federal Service for State Registration, Cadastre and Cartography (Rosreestr) (Russian: Федеральная служба государственной регистрации, кадастра и картографии, «Росреестр») (prior to December 30, 2008, Federal Registration Service) is a federal agency in Russia, responsible for the organization of the Unified State Register of Rights on Real Estate and Transactions (Russian: Единый государственный реестр прав на недвижимое имущество и сделок с ним), as well as the spatial data infrastructure of the Russian Federation. It is Russia's official cadastre and cartography agency. According to the amendments to the list of names and abbreviations of the federal bodies of executive power (the order of the Presidential Administration of Russia and the Government of Russia of July 16, 2008 № 943/788) of 2 March 2009 number P41-6596 abbreviation of the Federal Service for State Registration, Cadastre and Cartography - Rosreestr. In the past it was under the Ministry of Economic Development but has since directly subordinated Government of Russia.

== History ==
During the existence of the Russian Empire, Russia had various land registers and surveying institutions, but no single nationwide agency. Land ownership was documented in Zemstvo records, church archives, and local authorities. During the early Soviet period, land was state-owned, and cadastral functions were fragmented across ministries and agencies. On March 15, 1919, the Supreme Geodetic Administration (VGU) was created. From June 15, 1935 it was reformed into the Main Administration of State Surveying and Cartography of the NKVD. By Resolution of the Council of People's Commissars of the USSR No. 1196 of September 23, 1938, it was separated from the NKVD and transformed into the Main Administration of Geodesy and Cartography under the Council of People's Commissars of the USSR. On May 10, 1967, the Chief Directorate of Geodesy and Cartography under the USSR Council of Ministers (Russian: Главное управление геодезии и картографии) known in its acronym Glavgeodeziya (Russian: Главгеодезия) managed mapping, while rights registration did not exist in the modern sense due to the political and economic system of the country which was communist with no private ownership. On April 20, 1991, the Main Directorate of Geodesy and Cartography under the Council of Ministers of the RSFSR (Glavkartografiya RSFSR) was established.

Following the collapse of the Soviet Union in December 1991, the new Russian state inherited the cadastral system of the Soviet Union which had to be reformed to meet the demands of a market economy which is based on private property rights. As a result, in the 90s the following agencies were created:

- Federal Agency for Geodesy and Cartography created on September 30, 1992 handled mapping.
- Federal Agency for Real Estate Cadastre handled cadastral records.
- Federal Registration Service (Rosregistratsiya) handled property rights.

The system was characterized by fragmentation, which led to inconsistencies and delays.

In 1997, the Law of the Russian Federation "On State Registration of Rights to Real Estate and Transactions Therewith" was adopted. On January 1, 2000, the creation of a system of justice institutions for state registration of rights to real estate and transactions therewith in all subjects of the Russian Federation was completed.

By Decree of the Russian president Vladimir Putin On the System and Structure of Federal Executive Authorities dated March 9, 2004 No. 314, the Federal Registration Service (Rosregistration) was established.

By Decree of the President dated December 25, 2008 No. 1847, it was renamed the Federal Service for State Registration, Cadastre and Cartography (Rosreestr), a transition period is provided for the transfer of functions and powers to it from the abolished Federal Agency for Real Estate Cadastre (Rosnedvizhimost) and the Federal Agency for Geodesy and Cartography (Roskartografiya). On March 1, 2009, the transition period was completed.

Following its inception, Rosreester was responsible for two registries: the EGRP (rights registry) and GKN (cadastre). In 2017, with the adoption of Federal Law No. 218-FZ, these two registries were unified into EGRN, which Rosreestr administers.

The administrative regulations for the work of Rosreestr were approved by Order of the Ministry of Economic Development of Russia dated June 7, 2017 No. 278 "On approval of the Administrative Regulations of the Federal Service for State Registration, Cadastre and Cartography for the provision of public services for state cadastral registration and (or) state registration of rights to real estate" and Order of Rosreestr dated June 18, 2019 No. P/0240 "On approval of the Administrative Regulations for the implementation of state land supervision by the Federal Service for State Registration, Cadastre and Cartography".

== See also ==
- Topographic Service of the Russian Armed Forces
- Corps of Military Topographers of the Russian Imperial Army
