= Christian music festival =

A Christian music festival (also known as a Jesus music festival or simply a Jesus festival) is a music festival held by the Christian community, in support of performers of Christian music. The festivals are characterized by more than just music; many feature motivational speakers and evangelists, and include seminars on Christian spiritual and missions topics, service, and evangelism. They are often viewed as evangelical tools, and small festivals can draw 10 times the crowd of traditional revival meetings. While the central theme of a Christian festival is Jesus Christ, the core appeal of a Christian music festival remains the artists and their music. Critics point out that the dichotomy of business and religious interests can be problematic for Christian festivals. In similar ways as the Christian music industry in general, festivals can be drawn away from their central theme and gravitate toward commercialization and mainstream acts in an attempt to draw crowds.

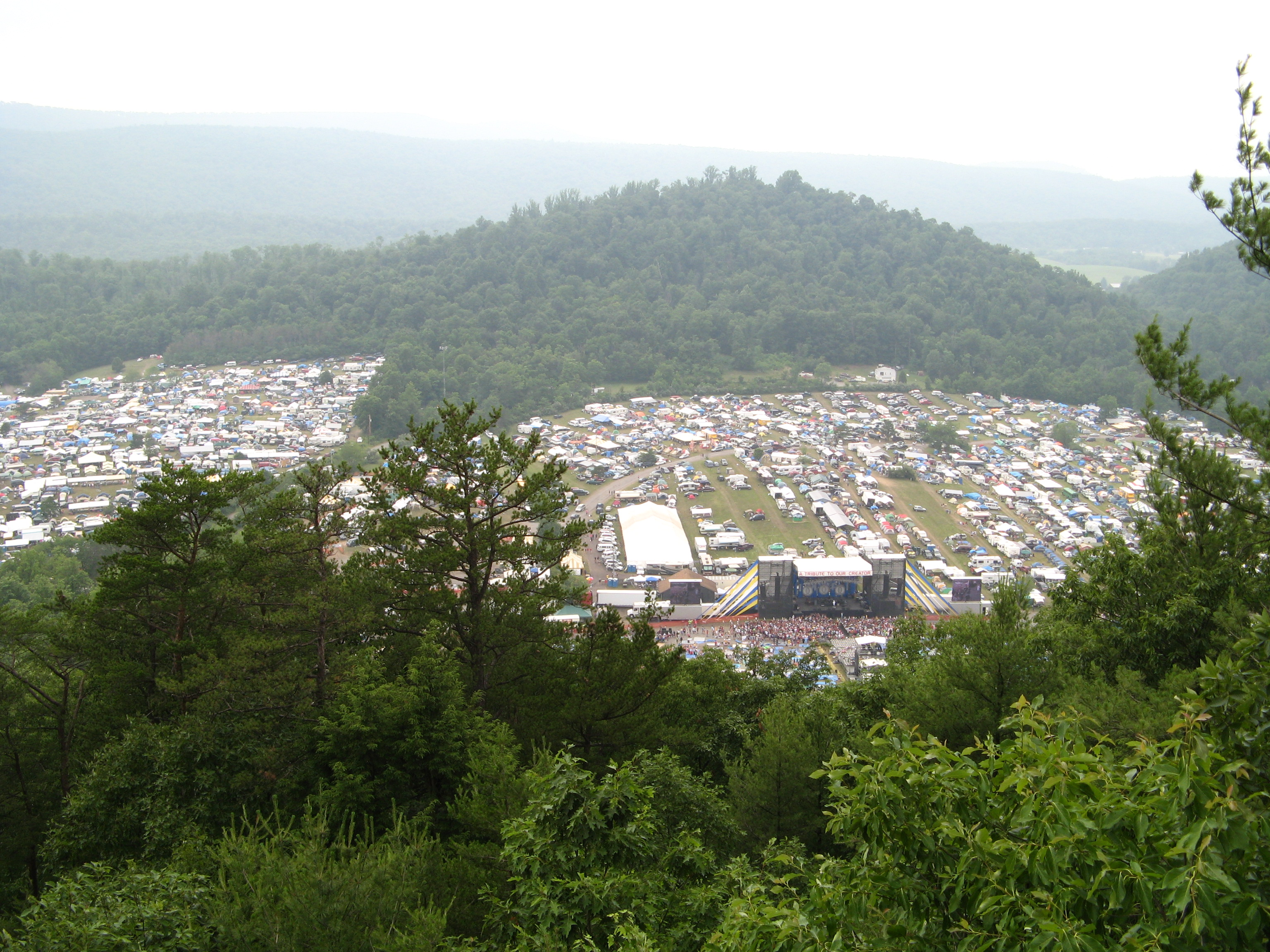
Creation Festival, 2007

Though Christian music festivals had been held prior to it, 1972 is seen as a pivotal year for Christian music due to the Explo '72 event, which was concluded by a massive music festival. Today Christian music festivals are held regularly throughout the United States and around the world. Christian music festivals were often supported by evangelical organizations; this is still true today, however, there are a number of free-standing festivals as well. Christian festivals are sometimes attached as secondary events to youth conferences, revival meetings, or billed as a part of a weekend package at theme parks. In 1999 the Gospel Music Association estimated the commercial revenue of Christian music festivals in the United States at approximately $22 million, with a combined attendance of over one-half million people. Christian music festivals continued to grow significantly into the 2000s, with the number of large festivals rising, and the formation of a representative organization for the festivals themselves.

While counter-culture is generally accepted many attendees dress conservatively, and unlike their mainstream counterparts Christian music festivals are relatively free of alcohol and drug use. Even at the Explo '72 festival, which was attended by 150,000 or more people, police reported a trouble free event.

== In the United States ==
In the early days of the Jesus People movement Christian events were sometimes held as part of secular music festivals. As the genre of Jesus music gained artists, its followers began to sponsor festivals, mimicking secular events such as Woodstock and Monterey Pop Festival. One of the first events, the Youth for Christ sponsored Faith Festival, was first held in 1970 in Evansville, Indiana. The event drew enough attention that the following year it garnered coverage by CBS and attracted about 15,000. Artists at the Faith Festival included Pat Boone, Gene Cotton, Danny Taylor, Crimson Bridge, and "e", a band which included Greg X. Volz. The attention that the Faith Festivals drew made them prototypes for future Christian music festivals.

Also in 1970, Asbury Theological Seminary professor Robert Lyon founded the Ichthus Music Festival, which is presently the longest running Christian music festival. The Hollywood Free Paper, a publication about the Jesus people movement, sponsored festivals in California and other areas of the United States. In 1971 the "Love Song Festival", sponsored by Maranatha! Music, was held at Knott's Berry Farm. Attendance was reported to be 20,000, a park record at the time, and artists included Love Song, The Way, Blessed Hope, and the Children of the Day. In late 1971 Christianity Today summarized four festivals that had taken place during the summer season. The same article described the artists who appeared at a Santa Barbara, California event, including Gentle Faith, Tom Howard, Ron Salsbury, The Bridge, and Randy Stonehill, as being "veterans of Jesus rock festivals".

1972 is seen as a pivotal year for Christian music festivals due to a crusade and evangelism training event called Explo '72, held in Dallas, Texas. Explo was sponsored by the World Conference on Missions and Campus Crusade for Christ. The week-long event was attended by 80,000 registered attendees and concluded with a day-long music festival. The attendance of the final event was reported by Life magazine at 150,000 and was characteristic by Billy Graham as a "religious Woodstock". The Explo '72 roster contained artists in a variety of genres including performers Larry Norman, Love Song, Andrae Crouch, and Johnny Cash. Explo '72 was a watershed event for the fledgling Jesus Music genre, and was the most visible event of the Jesus People movement. It is also the largest Christian music festival ever recorded; some critics even credit Explo with jump-starting the Christian music industry.

Early Christian music festivals were noted for their conservatism, often limiting their artistic expression to "safe, middle-of-the-road acts." The Jesus Festival, which was founded in 1973, offers a few illustrative incidents. In their inaugural year they hired a promoter, Tim Landis, who brought in acts such as 2nd Chapter of Acts, Pat Terry, and Phil Keaggy. The conservative owners, who wanted a family oriented music festival, found the music "a little too racy" and fired him. The following year at the same festival, Randy Matthews was chased off stage by a crowd which pronounced him to be demon or drug possessed due to his musical style and his announcement of an impending tour with Lynyrd Skynyrd and ZZ Top. Matthews was later dropped from the tour roster.

Christian music festivals in 1975.
View

The number and size of Christian music festivals continued to grow alongside the Christian music industry. By the mid 1970s festivals had appeared in all parts of the country. Tim Landis went on to found the Creation Festival in 1979, which was designed to appeal the youth, and has become one of the largest Christian festivals in the United States. For several years Creation was held at the same venue as the Jesus Festival, the Agape Farm, only a few weeks apart. More specialized festivals appeared to fill niche markets within the industry. The first completely rock music oriented festival was held in 1981. Called Illinois Jam, it featured artists including Barnabas, Servant, Randall Waller, and Randy Stonehill. Christian metal festivals also emerged, particularly in the late 1980s. One such festival was held in Carson, California in September 1987. The lineup was entirely Christian metal bands and included Guardian, Barren Cross, Vengeance Rising, and many smaller bands.

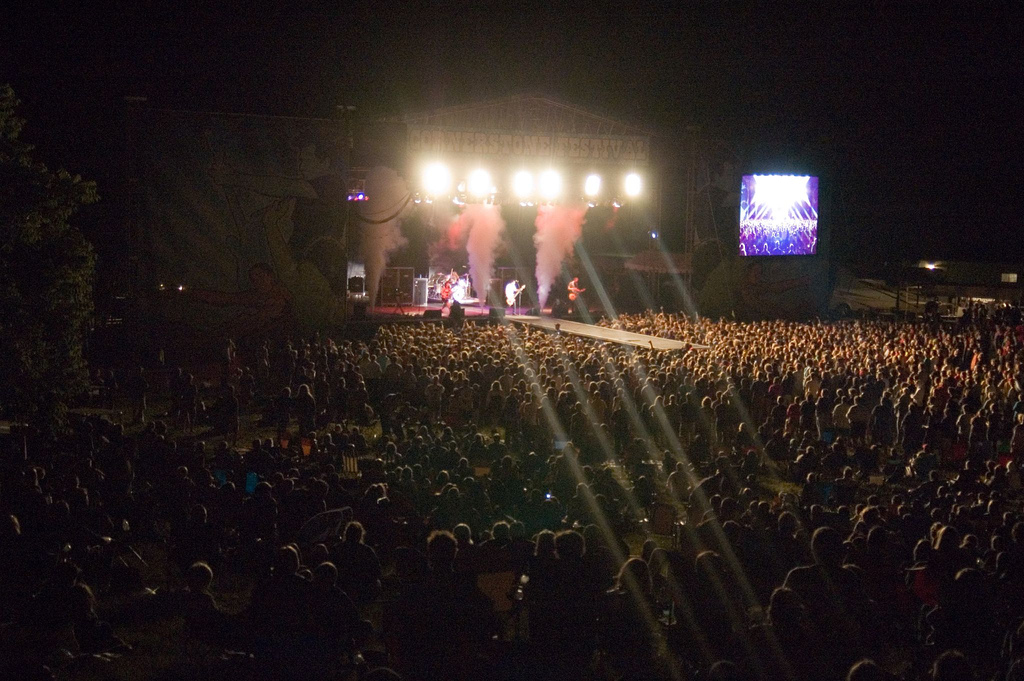
Cornerstone main stage, 2007

While the members of Jesus People USA had long been involved in Christian festivals around the country, the Chicago organization founded the Cornerstone Festival in 1984, influenced by the Greenbelt festival of the UK with which Jesus People USA shared a common heritage. Seeing the trend toward conservatism, Cornerstone was designed to set itself apart by being artistically unrestrictive. Its design came from the counter-culture of JPUSA itself, with an intent to appeal to an audience that may not have been attracted to more conservative forms of music. As Cornerstone magazine editor Jon Trott later characterized it: "Cornerstone would be to Jesus festivals what 7Up was to cola: the unfestival." Their slogan in 1984 was "More Rock And Roll Than Anyone Has Dared"; Artists included Kerry Livgren, Resurrection Band, The Choir, Joe English, and the Sweet Comfort Band. Cornerstone was one of the premier Christian music festivals, and was most influential promoting groups on the fringe of Christian music. The last Cornerstone Festival was held in 2012, citing the difficult economy.

The Alive Festival was founded in 1988 in Ohio and is one of the longest running three-day festivals with over 45 artists on three stages. In the 1990s the contemporary Christian music industry experienced explosive growth and saw the establishment of new festivals as well. The most significant of these are Purple Door and Tomfest, the latter of which regularly holds mini-festivals in diverse parts of the country. Since the turn of the century traveling tours such as Festival Con Dios and Shout Fest have appeared. They are often similar in structure to their secular counterparts such as Vans Warped Tour or Lollapalooza, offering extreme sports and a carnival-like atmosphere. Throughout the 2000s, the attendance at United States festivals grew significantly. According to one source, the number of Christian music festivals attended by more than 5000 youths grew from five in the year 2000 to 35 in 2006. As a result of this growth, many US festivals have formed a collective organization, the Christian Festival Association, to represent their interests.

LifeLight Communications started an annual LifeLight Music Festival in 1998 which now occurs over Labor Day weekend on farmland near Worthing, South Dakota.

== Worldwide ==
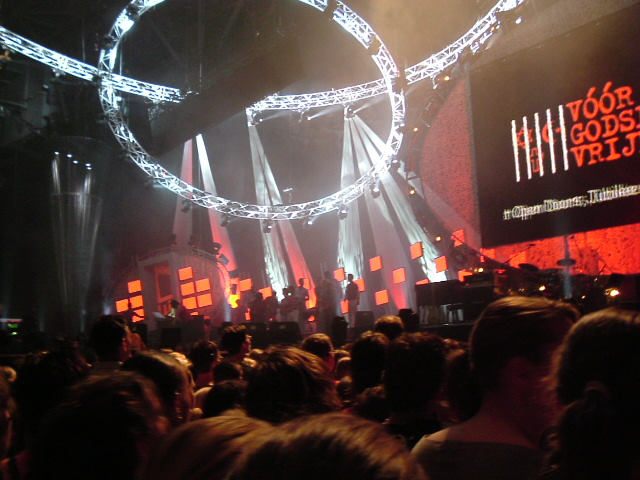
EO Youth Day in the Netherlands

Christian music festivals now exist throughout the world. The Jesus Music Greenbelt festival, founded in 1974 by Americans and British in the United Kingdom, was at one time the largest recurring Christian music festival in the world, and has always been focused on the arts as well as music. Germany is host to several festivals; four of the most notable are Christmas Rock Night, Freakstock, Himmelfahrt-Festival and Rock Without Limits. In greater Europe notable festivals include Flevo and EO-Youth Day in the Netherlands, Seaside Festival in Norway, the Big Boss' Festival in Switzerland, the Song of Songs Festival in Poland, Festival Lumen in Slovakia and Frizon Festival in Sweden. In 2014 the first Christian music festival is being held in Hungary (named Cross Sound).

A sanctioned Christian festival was held in 1989 in Tallinn, Soviet Estonia. The festival featured performances by American artists such as Sheila Walsh, Bruce Carroll, Paul Smith, and Scott Wesley Brown, and had an attendance of 15,000. This was reported to be the first such festival. In 1992, after the Fall of the Iron Curtain, a Christian music festival was held in St. Petersburg, Russia. Dubbed as a "Christian arts festival", the event included acts to appeal to all ages from a variety of styles, largely representing greater Europe and North America. The event also included orchestras from the UK and Russia, and Russian headliner Boris Grebenshchikov. The shows, which were organized by Youth With A Mission, sold out 10,000 tickets well in advance.

From 1992 to 2014, New Zealand hosted the Southern Hemisphere's largest Christian festival, the annual Parachute Music Festival. It attracted a large number of non-Christians.

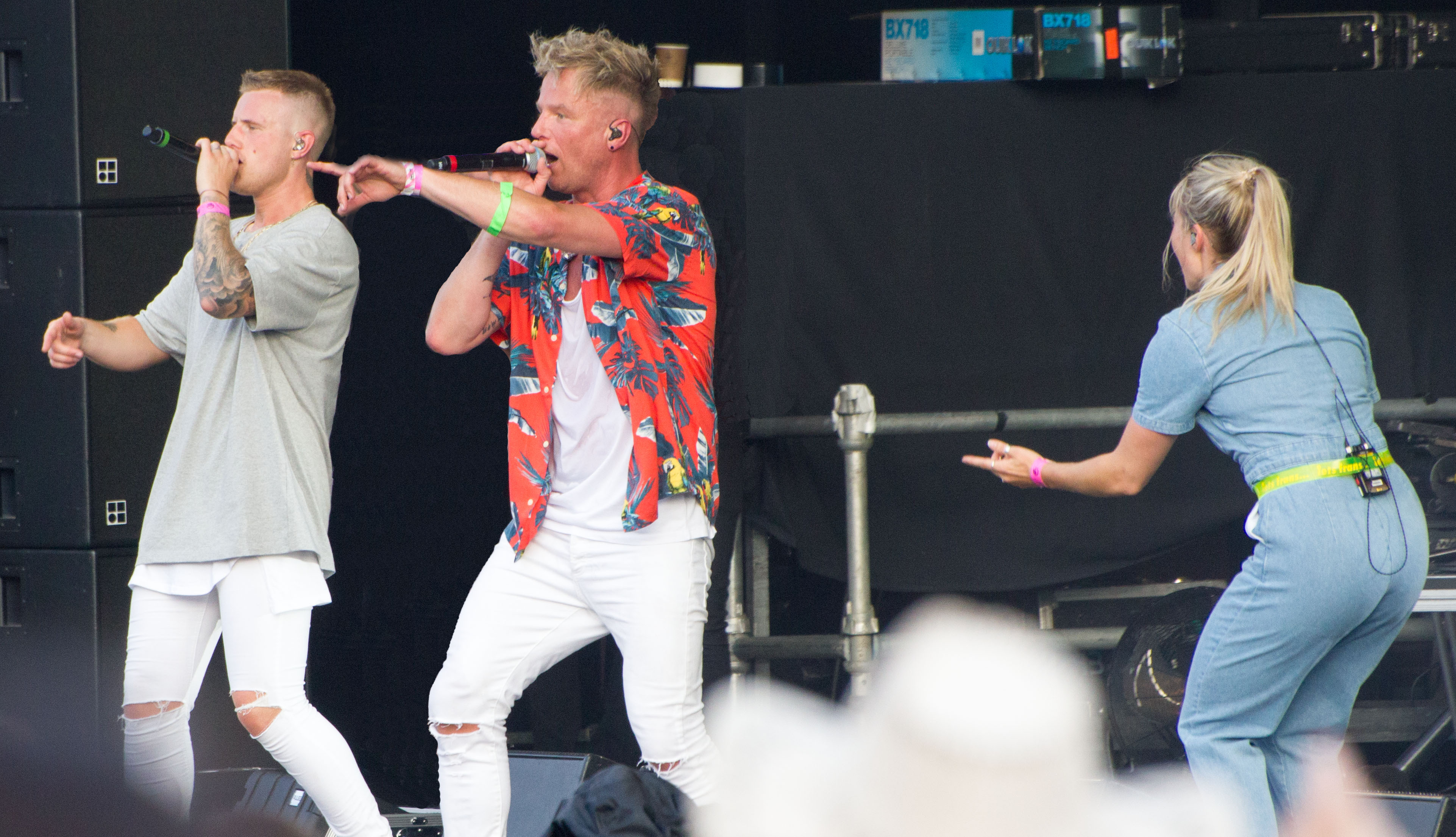
LZ7 performing at Big Church Festival at Wiston House, West Sussex, UK in May 2019.

In Brazil, in the city of Fortaleza, Ceará annually happens Halleluya Festival, which brings together music from the various attractions theatrical performances and dance. Is among the largest Catholic music festivals in the world, and in its latest edition the record crowd of 300,000 people in one day, and more than 1 million people over the five days of the Festival. The event is held by Catholic Community Shalom. The Halleluya Festival has editions in several Brazilian cities such as Brasília, Rio de Janeiro, São Paulo, and also outside the country as in Rome.

In the United Kingdom, Delirious? keyboardist Tim Jupp founded the Big Church Festival in 2009. The Festival, which began as Big Church Day Out, is held annually in Wiston, West Sussex, England. Performers have included Switchfoot, Reuben Morgan, Mary Mary, and Stu G. The Festival attracts approximately 30,000 people annually and from 2025, the Festival will move from the Late Spring Bank Holiday in May, to the Summer Bank Holiday in August and run for 3 days instead of 2.

== See also ==
- Music festival
- Christian music
