= 41st GMA Dove Awards =

2010 US music awards ceremony

- Date: April 21, 2010
- Location: The Opry Entertainment Complex, Nashville, Tennessee
- Hosted by: Bart Millard

The 41st Annual GMA Dove Awards presentation was held on April 21, 2010 recognizing accomplishments of musicians for the year 2009. The show was held at The Opry Entertainment Complex in Nashville, Tennessee, and was hosted by Bart Millard.

Nominations were announced on February 18, 2010 during a press conference at Belmont University's Curb Café in Nashville, Tennessee. The announcement was hosted by a group of artists which included Francesca Battistelli, Jeremy Camp, Jason Crabb, Brandon Heath, Kari Jobe, Michael W. Smith, Ben Tankard and Lisa Kimmey.

Casting Crowns won Artist of the Year, while Sidewalk Prophets won New Artist of the Year. Rock group Needtobreathe ended up winning the three awards it was nominated for. Other multiple winners include: Jennie Lee Riddle, Francesca Battistelli, and Jars of Clay.

== Performers ==
Opening ceremony

- Voices of Glory
- Karen Peck & New River
- Rhonda Vincent & The Rage
- Collin Raye
- The Nelons with Karen Peck

Telecast ceremony

The following performed:

Artist(s)	Song(s)
Natalie Grant; Jordin Sparks	"Human"
Kari Jobe; Phillips, Craig and Dean	"Revelation Song"
Brandon Heath; Jars of Clay	"Two Hands"
Jason Crabb; Donald Lawrence	"My Tribute"
The Blackwood Brothers; The Perrys; The Crabb Family; The Booth Brothers; Mosie Lister	Tribute to 100 Years of Southern Gospel "Give the World a Smile" "If You Knew Him" "Through the Fire" "Still Feeling Fine"
TobyMac and Diverse City	"Funky Jesus Music"
Ricky Skaggs; Gordon Kennedy	"Someday Soon"
MercyMe; David Crowder Band	"All of Creation"/"How He Loves"
Casting Crowns	"Until the Whole World Hears" (featuring New Hope Academy Children Choir)
Tenth Avenue North	"By Your Side"
Francesca Battistelli	"Beautiful, Beautiful"
Red; Brian "Head" Welch	"Fight Inside"/"Death Of Me"
BeBe & CeCe Winans	"Grace"
Amy Grant	"Better Than a Hallelujah"
Michael W. Smith; Jeremy Camp; TobyMac; Brandon Heath; Matt Maher; Nicole C. Mullen; Lee Greenwood; Veronica Petrucci; Wynonna Judd; Amy Grant; Natalie Grant; Melinda Doolittle; Phil Stacey; Mark Hall	"Come Together Now"

== Presenters ==
Telecast ceremony

The following presented:

- Tenley Molzhan – introduced Ricky Skaggs and Gordon Kennedy
- Bart Millard – Male Vocalist of the Year
- Franklin Graham – introduced the performance from "Come Together Now"
- David Mann

== Awards ==
=== General ===
Artist of the Year

- Francesca Battistelli
- Casting Crowns
- Jason Crabb
- Jars of Clay
- Mary Mary
- Skillet
- TobyMac

New Artist of the Year

- Crystal Aikin
- Bluetree
- Jonny Diaz
- Kari Jobe
- Revive
- Sidewalk Prophets
- Brian Courtney Wilson

Group of the Year

- Casting Crowns
- Gaither Vocal Band
- Hezekiah Walker & The Love Fellowship Crusade Choir
- Jars of Clay
- Needtobreathe
- Skillet
- Tenth Avenue North

Male Vocalist of the Year

- Jeremy Camp
- Jason Crabb
- Michael English
- Brandon Heath
- Donnie McClurkin
- Smokie Norful
- Bebo Norman
- Mark Schultz

Female Vocalist of the Year

- Francesca Battistelli
- Karen Peck Gooch
- Natalie Grant
- Heather Headley
- Mandisa
- Dawn Michele
- Laura Story

Song of the Year

- "Born to Climb" – Jeff & Sheri Easter
  - Wayne Haun, Joel Lindsey, songwriters
- "By Your Side" – Tenth Avenue North
  - Tenth Avenue North, songwriters
- "Free To Be Me" – Francesca Battistelli
  - Francesca Battistelli, songwriter
- "God Is There" – Diamond Rio
  - Marty Roe, Jimmy Olander, Bernie Herms, songwriters
- "I Will Rise" – Chris Tomlin
  - Louie Giglio, Chris Tomlin, Matt Maher, Jesse Reeves, songwriters
- "Let The Waters Rise" – Mikeschair
  - Sam Tinnesz, Mike Grayson, Ben Glover, songwriters
- "Revelation Song" – Phillips, Craig & Dean
  - Jennie Lee Riddle, songwriter
- "Somebody Like Me" – Jason Crabb
  - Neil Thrasher, Michael Boggs, songwriters
- "Two Hands" – Jars of Clay
  - Dan Haseltine, Charlie Lowell, Stephen Mason, Matt Odmark, Jeremy Lutito, Gabe Rushchival, songwriters
- "Why Can't All God's Children Get Along" – Karen Peck and New River
  - Stephen Hill, songwriter

Songwriter of the Year

- Francesca Battistelli
- Michael Boggs
- Mike Donehey
- Jason Ingram
- Jennie Lee Riddle
- Neil Thrasher

Producer of the Year

- Ed Cash
- Ian Eskelin
- Wayne Haun
- Bernie Herms
- Jason Ingram and Rusty Varenkamp

=== Pop ===
Pop/Contemporary Recorded Song of the Year

- "City on Our Knees" – tobyMac
- "Free to Be Me" – Francesca Battistelli
- "Let the Waters Rise" – Mikeschair
- "My Deliverer" – Mandisa
- "Until the Whole World Hears" – Casting Crowns

Pop/Contemporary Album of the Year

- Come Alive – Mark Schultz
- Mikeschair – Mikeschair
- Speaking Louder Than Before – Jeremy Camp
- The Long Fall Back to Earth – Jars of Clay
- These Simple Truths – Sidewalk Prophets

=== Rock ===
Rock Recorded Song of the Year

- "Bring Me to Life" – Thousand Foot Krutch
- "Fight Inside" – Red
- "Hero" – Skillet
- "Mess of Me" – Switchfoot
- "Mystery of You" – Red

Rock/Contemporary Recorded Song of the Year

- "Always" – Switchfoot
- "Can't Take Away" – Mikeschair
- "How He Loves" – David Crowder Band
- "Lay 'Em Down" – Needtobreathe
- "You Gave Me a Promise" – Fireflight

Rock Album of the Year

- Awake – Skillet
- Constellations – August Burns Red
- Crash – Decyfer Down
- Innocence & Instinct – Red
- Searchlights – Abandon
- Welcome to the Masquerade – Thousand Foot Krutch

Rock/Contemporary Album of the Year

- Church Music – David Crowder Band
- Confessions – Pillar
- It Is Well – Kutless
- Love & War – BarlowGirl
- The Outsiders – Needtobreathe

=== Rap/Hip-Hop ===
Rap/Hip-Hop Recorded Song of the Year

- "America" – Tracy Edmond
- "End of My Rope" – KJ-52
- "Go On" – B.Reith
- "Lost" – Da' T.R.U.T.H.
- "Movin'" – Group 1 Crew

Rap/Hip-Hop Album of the Year

- Five-Two Television – KJ-52
- Now Is Not Forever – B.Reith
- Reiterate – GRITS
- The Big Picture – Da' T.R.U.T.H.
- Thrilla – Mr. Del

=== Inspirational ===
Inspirational Recorded Song of the Year

- "Hold On To Jesus" – Austins Bridge
- "Hosanna" – Selah
- "Jesus Saves" – Travis Cottrell
- "Since The World Began" – Matt Maher, Amy Grant, Ed Cash, Mac Powell
- "The Only Hope" – Bebo Norman

Inspirational Album of the Year

- A Grand New Day – Women of Faith Worship Team
- Fearless – Phillips, Craig & Dean
- Jesus Saves Live – Travis Cottrell
- Live at Oak Tree – Aaron & Amanda Crabb
- You Deliver Me – Selah

=== Gospel ===
Southern Gospel Recorded Song of the Year

- "Because He Lives" – Gaither Vocal Band
- "Born to Climb" – Jeff & Sheri Easter
- "If You Knew Him" – The Perrys
- "Life Goes On" – Talley Trio
- "Live With Jesus" – Oak Ridge Boys

Southern Gospel Album of the Year

- Almost Morning – The Perrys
- Reunited – Gaither Vocal Band
- North America Live – The Hoppers
- Treasure – Janet Paschal
- Worth It – Brian Free & Assurance

Traditional Gospel Recorded Song of the Year

- "Always Remember" – Andrae Crouch
- "Don't Do It Without Me" – Bishop Paul S. Morton
- "How I Got Over" – Vickie Winans
- "Justified" – Smokie Norful
- "Oh Happy Day" – Queen Latifah

Traditional Gospel Album of the Year

- Almost Morning – Dorothy Norwood
- Gaither Vocal Band Reunited – Lee Williams and the Spiritual QC's
- Shout! Live – Mike Farris & The Roseland Rhythm Revue
- Treasure – Clarence Fountain, Sam Butler and The Boys

Contemporary Gospel Recorded Song of the Year

- "Awesome God" – Fred Hammond
- "Dear God" – Smokie Norful
- "Every Prayer" – Israel Houghton
- "So Good" – Melinda Watts
- "Souled Out" – Hezekiah Walker & LFC
- "The Power of One (Change the World)" – Israel Houghton
- "Wait On The Lord" – Donnie McClurkin

Contemporary Gospel Album of the Year

- America – Tracy Edmond
- Audience of One – Heather Headley
- Love Unstoppable – Fred Hammond
- Smokie Norful Live – Smokie Norful
- Souled Out – Hezekiah Walker & LFC

=== Country & Bluegrass ===
Country Recorded Song of the Year

- "Dry Bones" – Austins Bridge
- "God Is There" – Diamond Rio
- "King of the World" – Point of Grace
- "Somebody Like Me" – Jason Crabb
- "Thank God for Kids" – Ernie Haase and Signature Sound

Country Album of the Year

- Jason Crabb – Jason Crabb
- Live at Oak Tree – Austins Bridge
- Never Going Back – Collin Raye
- The Reason – Diamond Rio
- Then Sings My Soul – Ronnie Milsap

Bluegrass Recorded Song of the Year

- "I Heard My Savior Calling Me" – Rhonda Vincent
- "On The Other Side" – Dailey & Vincent
- "This World Is Not My Home" – Ricky Skaggs
- "When We Fly" – Little Roy Lewis & Lizzy Long
- "Working on a Building" – Patty Loveless

Bluegrass Album of the Year

- Blue Ridge Mtn. Memories – The Marksmen Quartet
- Breaking Like Dawn – Little Roy Lewis & Lizzy Long
- I Have Been Blessed – The Far City Boys
- I Just Want To Thank You Lord – Larry Sparks
- Lord Bless This House – Nothin Fancy
- The Isaacs ...Naturally – The Isaacs

=== Praise & Worship ===
Worship Song of the Year

- “Alive Again” – Matt Maher
  - Matt Maher and Jason Ingram, songwriters
- “Hosanna” – Selah
  - Paul Baloche and Brenton Brown, songwriters
- “I Will Rise” – Chris Tomlin
  - Chris Tomlin, songwriter
- “New Song We Sing”; Meredith Andrews
  - Meredith Andrews, Jason Ingram, and Keith Everette Smith, songwriters
- “Revelation Song” – Phillips, Craig & Dean
  - Jennie Lee Riddle, songwriter

Praise & Worship Album of the Year

- A Grand New Day – Women of Faith Worship Team
- Alive Again – Matt Maher
- Awaken The Dawn – Keith & Kristyn Getty
- Church Music – David Crowder Band
- Jesus Saves Live – Travis Cottrell

=== Others ===
Urban Recorded Song of the Year

- "Avaylable" – Kortney Pollard
- "Close To You" – BeBe & CeCe Winans
- "Just Love" – Brian Courtney Wilson
- "Just Wanna Say" – Israel Houghton
- "You Never Let Me Down" – Marvin Winans Jr.

Instrumental Album of the Year

- A Moment's Peace, Vol. 2 – Christopher Phillips and John Catchings
- A Moment's Peace, Vol. 1 – Christopher Phillips and John Catchings
- Joy Comes In The Morning – Stan Whitmire
- Mercy Mercy Mercy – Ben Tankard

Spanish Language Album of the Year

- Adorándote – Julissa
- Apasionado Por Ti – Rojo
- Cerca de Mí – Yamil Ledesma
- Le Canto – Kari Jobe
- Su Vida, Sus Pasos, Su Voz – Melodie Joy

Special Event Album of the Year

- CompassionArt: Creating Freedom From Poverty (Sparrow Records)
- Fireproof: Original Motion Picture Soundtrack (Reunion Records)
- Glory Revealed II: The Word of God In Worship (Reunion Records)
- Hip Hope Hits 2009 (Gotee Records)
- Oh Happy Day: An All-Star Music Celebration (EMI Gospel/Vector Recordings)

Children's Music Album of the Year

- Great Worship Songs for Kids 3 – GWS Kids Praise Band
- I Shine Jamz, Vol. 1 – Todd Collins
- Shout Praises Kids: Today Is The Day – Various
- The Real Thing – pureNRG
- Veggie Tales: Here I Am To Worship – Featuring Natalie Grant & Aaron Shust

Christmas Album of the Year

- Christ Is Come – Big Daddy Weave
- Christmas Is – Mark Harris
- Every Light That Shines at Christmas – Ernie Haase & Signature Sound
- Glory in the Highest: Christmas Songs of Worship – Chris Tomlin
- Family Force 5 Christmas Pageant – Family Force 5

Choral Collection of the Year

- Everlasting Praise 2 – Mike Speck and Stan Whitmire
- Hallelujah! Light Has Come – Various arrangers
- Hymns of the Ages – Lari Goss
- Let The Worshippers Arise – Various arrangers
- Jesus Saves Live – Travis Cottrell

Recorded Music Packaging of the Year

- Live Life Loud – Hawk Nelson
  - Bonnie Biro (art director), Ryan Clark (graphic artist), Caleb Kuhl (illustrator/photographer); BEC Recordings
- Lost in the Sound of Separation (Deluxe Edition) – Underoath
  - Jordan Butcher (art director), Drew Beckmeyer (graphic artist), Ryan Russell (illustrator/photographer); Tooth & Nail Records/Solid State Records
- It's All Crazy! It's All False! It's All a Dream! It's Alright – MewithoutYou
  - Jordan Butcher (art director/graphic artist), Vasily Kavonof (illustrator/photographer); Tooth & Nail Records
- The Long Fall Back to Earth (Limited Edition) – Jars of Clay
  - Tim Parker and Jars of Clay (art directors), Kharyn Hill; Gray Matters/Essential Records
- Forget and Not Slow Down – Relient K
  - Matthew Thiessen and Linden Frederick (art directors), Davy Baysinger, Ethan Luck, Cale Glendening; Mono Vs Stereo
- The Long Fall Back to Earth – Jars of Clay
  - Tim Parker and Jars of Clay (art directors), Kharyn Hill; Gray Matters/Essential Records

=== Musicals ===
Musical of the Year

- A Baby Changes Everything
- Glorious Impossible
- It's The Most Wonderful Time of the Year
- Reign, Jesus, Reign
- See What A Morning

Youth/Children's Musical

- Camp Wallaballa
- Christmas Hang-ups
- Get To The Manger!
- GPS (God's Plan of Salvation)
- The Best Christmas Present Ever!

=== Videos ===
Short Form Music Video of the Year

- "Beautiful Ending" – BarlowGirl
  - Tim Morgan (video director and producer)
- "Free to Be Me" – Francesca Battistelli
  - Andy & Jon Erwin (video directors), Dan Atchison (video producer)
- "Hero" – Skillet
  - Andy & Jon Erwin (video directors), Dan Atchison (video producer)
- "Live Life Loud" – Hawk Nelson
  - Etypical (video director), Kayvan Ghavim (video producer)
- "Lose My Soul" – TobyMac, featuring Kirk Franklin and Mandisa
  - Danny Yourd (video director), Danny Yourd and Steve Hoover (video producers)
- "Monster" – Skillet
  - Andy & Jon Erwin (video directors), Dan Atchison (video producer)
- "Too Bright To See" – Underoath
  - Anders Foreman (video director and producer)
- "Wait and See" – Brandon Heath
  - Eric Welch (video director), Tameron Hedge (video producer)

Long Form Music Video of the Year

- 45 Days (Documentary w/music) – Demon Hunter
  - Cale Glendening (video director), Don and Ryan Clark (video producers)
- A Gospel Journey – Oak Ridge Boys
  - Doug Stuckey (video director), Bill Gaither, Barry Jennings, and Bill Carter (video producers)
- A New Hallelujah: The Live Worship DVD – Michael W. Smith
  - Steve Gilreath (video director and producer)
- Faith + Hope + Love – Hillsong Live
  - Luke Irvine and Magdalene Phillips (video directors), Hillsong Music (video producers)
- Live at Oak Tree – Austins Bridge
  - Graham Bustin (video director), Paul Corley, Tre Corley, Norman Holland, Michael Turner, and Shannon Lancaster (video producers)
- Live Revelations – Third Day
  - Andy and Jon Erwin (video directors), Dan Atchison, Jonathan Erwin, and Andrew Erwin (video producers)

== Artists with multiple nominations and awards ==
The following artists received multiple nominations:

- Six: Jars of Clay, Skillet, Matt Maher and Jason Crabb
- Five: Francesca Battistelli
- Four: Smokie Norful
- Three: Casting Crowns, Gaither Vocal Band, Needtobreathe
- Two: Tenth Avenue North, Jeremy Camp

The following artists received multiple awards:

- Three: Needtobreathe
- Two: Jennie Lee Riddle, Francesca Battistelli, Jars of Clay
