= Revelation Song =

2009 song by Jennie Lee Riddle

"Revelation Song" is a song written by Jennie Lee Riddle with lyrics adapted from Revelation 4 of the New Testament. The song first gained exposure on U.S. Christian radio through a Christ for the Nations Institute recording, "Glorious" in 2004, as well as on Gateway Worship's debut album, Living for You in 2006, and subsequently included on Kari Jobe's self-titled album. It was later released by Phillips, Craig and Dean as the first single of Fearless.

== Phillips, Craig and Dean cover ==
"Revelation Song"

Single by Phillips, Craig and Dean

from the album Fearless
- Released: May 5, 2009
- Recorded: 2008–2009
- Genre: Contemporary worship music, CCM
- Length: 5:53 (album version); 4:47 (radio version)
- Label: INO
- Songwriters: Jennie Lee Riddle, 2004

Phillips, Craig and Dean singles chronology
"Top of My Lungs" (2008)	"Revelation Song" (2009)	"'Great Are You Lord'" (2010)

=== Release ===
Revelation Song was released by contemporary Christian group Phillips, Craig and Dean on May 5, 2009 as the lead single from their album Fearless. Their version quickly gained popularity, reaching No. 1 on Billboard's Hot Christian Songs chart in August 2009, and No. 31 on Billboard's Heatseekers Songs. It was the longest-running number-one song in any format on Christian radio in 2009. In all, it spent over 15 weeks atop Billboard's Hot Christian Adult Contemporary chart and 11 weeks atop Billboard's Hot Christian Songs chart.

Band member Randy Phillips explained why the trio recorded the song:

This song captures the moment of looking up into Heaven, peeling back the curtain of eternity so we can peek in. If you keep your eyes on the Dow Jones or nuclear weapons in North Korea, you’ll always be nervous. Look to the awesomeness of God instead.

=== Chart history ===
==== Weekly charts ====
Chart (2009)	Peak position
US Christian AC (Billboard)	1
US Christian Airplay (Billboard)	1
US Hot Christian Songs (Billboard)	1
US Christian AC Indicator (Billboard)	1
US Christian Soft AC (Billboard)	1
US Heatseeker Songs (Billboard)	28

==== Year-end charts ====
Chart (2009)	Peak position
US Christian Songs (Billboard)	3
US Christian AC (Billboard)	3

Chart (2010)	Peak position
US Christian AC (Billboard)	20

==== Decade-end charts ====
Chart (2000s)	Position
Billboard Hot Christian Songs	32

=== Certifications ===
Region	Certification	Certified units/sales
United States (RIAA)	Gold	500,000^{‡}
^{‡} Sales+streaming figures based on certification alone.

== Other cover versions ==
Diante do Trono released a Portuguese version, "Canção do Apocalipse", on Aleluia in 2010.

Newsboys released "Revelation Song" on God's Not Dead in 2011.

Latin American worship leader Ingrid Rosario recorded a Spanish version, "Digno y Santo", on Cuan Gran Amor (What Great Love). Danilo Montero also recorded a live version with Kari Jobe on Devoción.

Phillips, Craig & Dean and Kari Jobe performing "Revelation Song" at the 2010 GMA Dove Awards

== Awards ==
In 2010, the song won a Dove Award for Worship Song of the Year at the 41st GMA Dove Awards. It was also nominated for Song of the Year.
