= Breathe In (Phillips, Craig and Dean album) =

Studio album by Phillips, Craig and Dean
- Released: March 13, 2012
- Recorded: 2011–12
- Genre: CCM, worship
- Length: 43:53
- Label: Fair Trade
- Producer: Bernie Herms; Nathan Nockels

Phillips, Craig and Dean chronology
Hope for All the World (2010)	Breathe In (2012)	Above It All (2014)

Singles from Breathe In
- 1. "When the Stars Burn Down" Released: 2012; 2. "Great I Am" Released: 2012

Breathe In is the twelfth studio album from Christian Contemporary-Worship trio Phillips, Craig and Dean. It was released on March 13, 2012, on the Fair Trade Services label, and was produced by Bernie Herms and Nathan Nockels. The album has garnered positive reviews from the critics and the album has achieved commercial success as indicated by the charting positions.

== Critical reception ==
Professional ratings
Review scores
Source	Rating
About.com	4/5 stars
AllMusic	3/5 stars
Alpha Omega News	(B+)
CCM Magazine	4/5 stars
Christianity Today	2/5 stars
Cross Rhythms	8/10 stars
New Release Tuesday	4.5/5 stars
Worship Leader	4.5/5 stars

The album garnered generally positive to favorable reviews, but had some negativity about the effort, as well. About.com's Kim Jones bequeathed the album a four-out-of-five-stars, and praised the album for being "potent and powerful" in the worship area, which she said to that effect that the music was "Drenched with harmonies that sound like they were orchestrated in Heaven", and called it the trio's "best". Grace S. Aspinwall of CCM Magazine bestowed the album a four-out-of-five-stars, and affirmed that "PC&D have only gotten stronger with time." Cross Rhythms' Stephen Luff conferred an eight-out-of-ten-stars to the album, and applauded with a "Well up to the singing pastors' high standards." Amanda Furbeck of Worship Leader presented the album a four-and-a-half-out-of-five-stars, and extolled that "Breathe In is a fresh, rich, and powerful praise and worship album for the hurting, broken, and struggling. Its Top 40 flavor is masterfully mixed, and its sweet harmonic blend and encouraging, worshipful lyrics are a smooth cup of coffee for a weary soul." New Release Tuesday's Dawn Teresa granted the album a four-and-a-half-out-of-five-stars, and applauded that "Breathe In is a glowing showcase for time-tested musical trio Phillips, Craig & Dean. The three solidly demonstrate musical relevance, songwriting skills, and vocals that sound better than ever." Alpha Omega News' Rob Snyder bequeathed the album a B+ grade, which means that the album is a little better than "Not perfect, but worth checking out", and admired "their message of love and hope".

AllMusic's Jon O'Brien gave a more mixed review of the effort, noting that "Fans of polished indie rock worship music will no doubt feel uplifted by Breathe In's first half, but a plodding and derivative second suggests the trio have now milked the Coldplay cow dry." Even further, Robert Ham of Christianity Today levied the worst rating against the album, with only a two-out-of-five-stars, and cautioned that "The intensity may rise and fall at times, but otherwise these songs of praise can only be differentiated through subtle shifts in instrumentation and melody."

== Track listing ==
Album release
No.	Title	Writer(s)	Length
1.	"Great and Glorious"	Bernie Herms, Matt Hooper, Jonathan James & Mark Stevens	4:59
2.	"Our God Is Here"	Seth Mosley & John Otero	4:09
3.	"Great I Am"	Jared Anderson	4:29
4.	"When the Stars Burn Down (Blessing and Honor)"	Jennie Lee Riddle	5:02
5.	"Speechless"	Phillip LaRue & Mosley	4:23
6.	"Tell Your Heart to Beat Again"	Herms, Randy Phillips & Matthew West	3:58
7.	"Great Great God"	David Moore	4:03
8.	"I Choose to Believe"	Dan Dean, Don Poythress & Tony Wood	4:25
9.	"These Bones"	Kyle Lee & R. Phillips	3:44
10.	"All Is Well"	Shawn Craig	4:41
Total length:			43:53

== Personnel ==
Phillips, Craig and Dean

- Randy Phillips – lead vocals (1–3, 5, 8, 9), backing vocals
- Shawn Craig – lead vocals (2, 3, 5, 7, 10), backing vocals
- Dan Dean – lead vocals, backing vocals

Musicians (Tracks #1 & 4–6)

- Bernie Herms – keyboards, programming (4), acoustic piano (6)
- Peter King – keyboards (1, 5), programming (5)
- Matt Stanfield – keyboards (4), programming (4)
- Andy Selby – keyboards (4), programming (4)
- Mike Payne – guitars (1), electric guitars (6)
- Adam Lester – electric guitars (4–6)
- Jason Hoard – electric guitars (4, 5)
- Stu Garrard– electric guitars (4, 5)
- Trevor Morgan – acoustic guitar (6)
- Tony Lucido – bass (1, 6)
- Joey Canaday – bass (4, 5)
- Dan Needham – drums

Musicians (Tracks #2, 3 & 7–10)

- Nathan Nockels – keyboards, programming, acoustic guitars, electric guitars
- Matt Stanfield – programming
- Jason Hoard – electric guitars
- Pat Malone – bass
- Jacob Arnold – drums

== Production ==
Tracks #1 & 4-6

- Produced and Arranged by Bernie Herms
- Recorded and Edited by Ben Phillips at Superphonic (Nashville, TN).
- Vocals engineered by Bernie Herms
- Mixed by Craig Alvin, assisted by Ryan Williamson.
- Production Coordination – Kristi Brazell for Maximum Artist Group.

Tracks #2, 3 & 7-10

- Producer by Nathan Nockels
- Tracked at White Cabin Studios (Atlanta, GA) by Jim Dineen.
- Overdubs recorded at Berwick Lane (Atlanta, GA) and Sonica (Atlanta, GA) by Nathan Nockels.
- Mixed by Ainselle Grosser

Additional Credits

- A&R – James Rueger
- Mastered by Andrew Mendleson at Georgetown Masters (Nashville, TN).
- Creative Director and Wardrobe Styling – Dana Salsedo
- Design – Daniel McCarthy
- Grooming – Rachel Banta

== Charts ==
Chart (2012)	Peak position
US Billboard 200	88
US Top Christian Albums (Billboard)	6
