= Musica (sculpture) =

Bronze statue in Nashville, Tennessee

Coordinates: 36°9′7.52″N 86°47′29.92″W

External image
- Photograph of "Musica" on Flickr

Musica is a bronze statue that sits upon a grassy knoll in Nashville, Tennessee, at the center of a traffic rotary where the confluence of Division Street and 16th Avenue North happens, known as the Music Row Roundabout or Buddy Killen Circle.

It is located directly across from Owen Bradley Park in Nashville's Music Row district. It was built as part of an urban renewal project for the Music Row neighborhood and unveiled in 2003.

== Composition ==
Musica is Alan LeQuire's largest sculpture commission to date, and currently the largest sculpture group in the United States. It features nine nude figures, male and female, dancing in a circular composition approximately 38 feet (11.5 m) tall. There are five figures which spring forth from the base. Four more rise up in the center floating above the others. The pinnacle of the statue is a female holding a tambourine. The scale of each figure is fourteen to fifteen feet, or more than twice life-size. The dancers and part of the base are cast in bronze. The other part of the base is composed of massive natural limestone boulders, which are prevalent in the Nashville area.

Much of the work on the statue was actually done at a foundry in Lander, Wyoming, with the pieces transported and assembled onsite. It weighs approximately 10 tons.

== Vision ==
LeQuire writes of his work:

Dance is the physical expression of music and the piece is intended to convey that feeling to the viewer in a composition which is simple, exuberant and celebratory. The theme of the sculpture is music, because of the historical and economic significance of the site. This is the heart of Music Row, the area and the artistic activity for which Nashville is best known. The sculpture conveys the importance of music to Nashville, past, present and future, and represents all forms of music without reference to any one form or style. It is meant to provide a visual icon for the area and for the city as a whole. The theme is music, but the sculpture represents artistic creativity itself. An artistic idea often seems to miraculously and spontaneously burst forth. This is what happens in the sculpture, and the title Musica suggests this since it refers to all the 'arts of the muses.'

He also intended for the work to make a statement about Multiculturalism/diversity and racial harmony.

Just as I wanted all different kinds of music included, not just country, I always wanted it to be a reflection of our culture the way it is. ... this is a multicultural city with an amazing number of ethnicities in it.

Using live models, whose facial and bodily features he depicted, LeQuire created two Caucasian women and one Caucasian man; an African-American man and woman; one Asian-American woman; a Native American man; and a Hispanic man and woman.

== Funding ==
The $1.1-million project, funded by local arts patrons who gave on the condition of anonymity, is being offered as a gift to the city to highlight that very point. Such a permanent tribute, since approved by the Metropolitan Nashville Arts Commission and Metro Council, is what project backers sought originally when they approached LeQuire several years back. The artist is quoted as saying:

They wanted to do something lasting for that area, which is such a significant place in the history and future of Nashville. Plus, everyone felt that Music Row, as important as it has been, never had a sort of identifying feature. That was the whole reason for the roundabout itself, and those who created it always imagined a monument that went in the center.

== Controversy ==
The work was controversial due to its depiction of nudity, although according to LeQuire the work is entirely tasteful and not at all sexualized.

One television commentator, Larry Brinton, referred to the statue constantly as "the naked statue" after its unveiling. Others expressed even stronger disapproval. "It seems quite hypocritical to me that, in a nation like ours, naked statues paid for by private money can be displayed on public land but a copy of the Ten Commandments paid for by private funds could not," said Jerry Sutton, former pastor of the Two Rivers Baptist Church in Nashville. Sutton and others called unsuccessfully for removal of the statue from public view.

Proponents of the statue were equally vehement in its defense. Columnist Gail Kerr of The Tennessean wrote, "It's art. But naked art, predictably, has some people all upset. I'm not sure why really. We've already got naked statues." She urged bemused indifference to the current controversy. "If you have such a peculiar fetish for bronze that fondling Musica's tambourine will be simply irresistible, just steer clear of the roundabout. Otherwise, don't get your toga in a wad."

On Saint Patrick's Day, 2010, a local music group, the Willis Clan, and a group of friends, clothed the statues in oversized Celtic kilts and blouses they had made for the event, in what one local news source described as an "epic" prank. 2011 was the second year the ritual was performed. Unfortunately the wind that day was particularly violent; the statues had to be reclothed multiple times to keep from exposing anything explicit. The sculpture occasionally adorns other trinkets, such as T-shirts supporting the Nashville Predators during playoff runs, as well as runners' bibs during the Country Music Marathon.
