= Above It All =

Studio album by Phillips, Craig and Dean
- Released: November 10, 2014
- Genres: CCM, worship
- Length: 39:04
- Label: Fair Trade Services
- Producers: Seth Mosley; Nathan Nockels

Phillips, Craig and Dean chronology
Breathe In (2012)	Above It All (2014)	Hymns & Psalms (2017)

Above It All marks the thirteenth album from Phillips, Craig and Dean. Fair Trade Services released the project on November 10, 2014. Phillips, Craig and Dean worked with producers Seth Mosley and Nathan Nockels in the creation of this album.

== Critical reception ==
Professional ratings
Review scores
Source	Rating
365 Days of Inspiring Media	4/5 stars
CCM Magazine	4/5 stars
Christian Music Review	4.3/5
New Release Tuesday	4.5/5 stars
The Phantom Tollbooth	3.5/5
Worship Leader	3/5 stars

Signaling in a four star review by CCM Magazine, Andy Argyrakis responds, "This thirteenth studio album once again features the trio's signature harmonies over vertical lyrics, alongside some new-found electronic elements, which may seem out of character to more traditionally minded adult contemporary listeners, but never diminish these veteran singers' seasoned abilities." Adding a half star to her rating compared to the aforementioned, New Release Tuesday's Phronsie Howell recognizes, "Above It All is an excellent worship album, and I can see a few of the songs being brought into the music rotation of many churches." Indicating in a three star review at Worship Leader, Barry Westman says, "a bit predictable".

Joshua Andre, awarding the album four stars at 365 Days of Inspiring Media, writes, "Phillips, Craig And Dean have created a stellar and engaging album, as Above It All combines the energetic and enthusiastic heart for Jesus that each of the three vocalists have, a fresh and relevant musical sound, as well as the musical prowess of producer Seth Mosley." Rating the album a 4.3 out of five for Christian Music Review, Laura Chambers says, "it doesn't hurt that the melodies are appealing, and in, at least one case, groovy." Michael Dalton, indicating in a 3.5 out of five review at The Phantom Tollbooth, replies, "This consistently sounds a triumphant note."

== Track listing ==
No.	Title	Writer(s)	Length
1.	"What Hope Feels Like"	Shawn Craig, Jason Ingram, Jonathan Smith	4:00
2.	"High Above It All"	John Farro, Sam Tinnesz	3:54
3.	"Jesus, Only Jesus"	Chris Tomlin, Christy Nockels, Kristian Stanfill, Matt Redman, Nathan Nockels, Tony Wood	4:19
4.	"Let It Be Known"	Nick Herbert, Tim Hughes, Tom Smith	3:40
5.	"Throne of Praise"	Chris Lockwood, Krissy Nordhoff	3:31
6.	"Voices from the Other Side"	Randy Phillips, Matthew West	3:52
7.	"Hope Has a Name"	Craig, Jennie Lee Riddle, Travis Ryan	3:37
8.	"Come as You Are"	Dan Dean, Scott Krippayne	3:53
9.	"If Not for Grace"	Riddle, Dean, Devin Dean	4:04
10.	"Join the Song"	Phillips, West	4:14
Total length:			39:04

== Personnel ==
Phillips, Craig and Dean

- Randy Phillips – lead vocals (2–6, 10), backing vocals
- Shawn Craig – lead vocals (2, 3, 7), backing vocals
- Dan Dean – lead vocals (1–5, 8, 9), backing vocals

Tracks #1, 2 & 4–10

- Produced by Seth Mosley
- Engineered by Mike "X" O'Connor, Buckley Miller and Seth Mosley.
- Editing and Vocal Engineering –Mike "X" O'Connor and Jericho Scoggins
- Mixed by Sean Moffitt
- Recorded at Full Circle Music (Franklin, TN).
- Mastered by Aya Merrill at Sterling Sound (New York, NY).
- Production Coordination – Celi Mosley
- Keyboards, synthesizers and Hammond B3 organ – Tim Lauer and Seth Mosley
- Programming – Matt Stanfield and Seth Mosley
- Guitars – Mike Payne, Andrew DeRoberts and Seth Mosley
- Bass – Tony Lucido and Eli Beard
- Drums – Ben Phillips and Nick Buda
- Percussion – Seth Mosley and Ben Phillips
- Backing vocals – Seth Mosley, Tasha Leyton, Tyler George, Jordan George and Laura Cooksey

Track #3

- Produced and Recorded by Nathan Nockles
- Recorded at Berwick Lane (Atlanta, GA).
- Drums recorded by Stephen Lewieke
- Mixed by Neal Avron
- Mastered by Tom Coyne at Sterling Sound (New York, NY).
- Keyboards, programming and guitars – Nathan Nockles
- Additional programming – Joe Thibideau
- Bass – Chris Brink
- Drums – Paul Mabury

Production and design

- A&R – James Rueger
- Art Direction/Wardrobe – Dana Salsedo
- Design – Josh Hailey for Mellowtown
- Photography – Trey Hill
- Hair/Make-up – Heather Spivey

== Charts ==
Chart (2014)	Peak position
US Billboard 200	198
US Top Christian Albums (Billboard)	13
