= Thrilla =

Thrilla may refer to:

- Thrilla (album), a 2009 album by Mr. Del
- Thrilla, a member of the Heatmakerz
