= Jesus Saves =

"Jesus Saves" is the name of a well-known Christian hymn. "Jesus Saves" may also refer to:

- Jesus Saves (novel), a novel by Darcey Steinke
- "Jesus Saves", a song on the album Reign in Blood by Slayer
- "Jesus Saves", a song on the album Streets: A Rock Opera by Savatage
- "Jesus Saves", a song on the album We Cry Out: The Worship Project by Jeremy Camp

== See also ==
- Jesus Saves Live, an album by Travis Cottrell
- Media related to Jesus Saves at Wikimedia Commons
