= Travis Cottrell =

- Origin: Boone, North Carolina, US
- Genres: CCM; praise & worship
- Years active: 1992–present
- Website: traviscottrell.com

Travis Cottrell is an American contemporary Christian music (CCM) artist, songwriter, author, and worship leader.

== Biography ==
Cottrell grew up in Boone, North Carolina. In 1990, he moved to Nashville to study at Belmont University. After graduating in 1992 with a degree in music he dedicated time to songwriting. Also in 1992, he wrote Larnelle Harris' song "It's Only Thunder". Cottrell worked with Kathie Hill on a musical titled Waiters: A Youth Musical About Waiting on the Lord. He has continued to write songs and he works as an editor for a music publishing company.

In 1994, the church Cottrell attended, Two Rivers Baptist Church in Nashville, lost its minister of worship and at the church's request, Cottrell was the worship leader for about a year and a half. He said, "The opportunity of leading worship at Two Rivers Baptist Church that Dr. Jerry Sutton gave me was a blessing." Since that time Cottrell's vocals have been on several praise and worship albums led by Don Moen. Cottrell has led worship at Beth Moore's conferences titled Living Proof Live since 1998.

Since 2002 he has released several solo albums of praise and worship and received several nominations for Dove Awards. He writes songs and provide background vocals for artists including Amy Grant, Alan Jackson, and Garth Brooks. In 2010, Cottrell moved to Jackson, Tennessee to be the music minister at Englewood Baptist Church. On July 4, 2020, he became the worship leader at Brentwood Baptist Church in Brentwood, Tennessee.

== Discography ==
=== Solo albums ===
- The Deep (2002)
- Unashamed Love (2003)
- Alive Forever (2004)
- Found (2006)
- Ring the Bells (2008)
- Jesus Saves Live (2010)
- When the Stars Burn Down (2011)
- I'm Living Proof (2014)
- All That Is Within Me (2016)
- The Reason (2018)
- Spirit Rise (2020)
- The Kindness Of The Cross (2022)
- Come Behold Emmanuel: A Christmas Worship Celebration (2023)
- Son Of God Son Of Man (2024)
- Hymnal one (2024)
- Before The Manger (2024)
- Redemption Story (2025)
- Christus Victor: Hymns Of The Gettys Vol. 1 (2025)
- Victory In Jesus: Hymns Of The Gettys Vol. 2 (2025)
- Humble Adoration (2025)
- Tribute To The King (2026)
- Any Given Sunday (2026)

=== Collaborations and vocals ===
- Don Moen - Mighty Cross (1994)
- Don Moen - Emmanuel Has Come (1996)
- Beth Moore - Living Proof Live 2 (2000)
- Don Moen - God in Us (2001)
- Don Moen - Thank You Lord (2004)
- MercyMe - Coming Up to Breathe (2006)
- Various - iWorship/Connect: Live Your Worship (2009)
- Various - iWorship Hymns: The Essential Collection (2009)
- Max Lucado - Fearless Worship (2009)
- Various - Pressing On: Songs inspired by the Journeys of Paul (2009)

=== Publications ===
- Cottrell, Travis (2013). He Knows Your Name. Worthy Publishing. ISBN 9781617951916.

== Awards and recognition ==
In 2010, Cottrell received four Dove Awards nominations for his album Jesus Saves Live:

Year	Presenter	Nominated work	Award	Result
2010	GMA Dove Awards	"Jesus Saves"	Inspirational Recorded Song of the Year	Nominated
2010	GMA Dove Awards	Jesus Saves Live	Inspirational Album of the Year	Nominated
2010	GMA Dove Awards	Jesus Saves Live	Praise & Worship Album of the Year	Nominated
2010	GMA Dove Awards	Jesus Saves Live	Choral Collection of the Year	Won
