= Hope for All the World EP =

Studio album by Phillips, Craig and Dean
- Released: November 23, 2010
- Genres: Christmas; Contemporary Christian
- Length: 19:54 (LP), 36:34 (CD)
- Label: Independent
- Producer: Nathan Nockels

Phillips, Craig and Dean chronology
Fearless (2009)	Hope for All the World EP (2010)	Breathe In (2012)

Singles from Hope for All the World
- 1. "For All The World" Released: November 2010

Hope for All the World EP is the twelfth main studio release and second Christmas album by CCM trio Phillips, Craig and Dean. It was released on November 23, 2010. It was the group's first EP, however all songs from the EP were later included in a full-length Christmas studio album released in 2013 with the same name, along with four brand new songs.

== Reception ==
=== Singles ===
The first single from the EP, For All The World, has performed moderately successful on Christian radio charts, debuting at No. 13 on the INSPO chart and 28 the Billboard Christian Songs chart. It is currently at 17 on the Christian Songs chart, 16 on the Soft AC/INSPO chart, and 10 on the INSPO chart

Do You Hear What I Hear has also charted at No. 31 on the Billboard chart and 20 on the Soft AC/INSPO and received radio airplay, despite not being officially released as a single.

== Track listing ==
1. "For All The World" (Kyle Wayne Lee, Michael Farren) – 3:57
2. "O Come All Ye Faithful" – 3:44
3. "Do You Hear What I Hear" – 4:24
4. "A Night of Hope" (Geron Davis, Dan Dean) – 3:49
5. "God Bless Us" (Scott Krippayne, Jeff Peabody) – 3:35
6. "Jingle Bells (Duck Mix)" – 1:45

Total Length: 19:54

2013 CD Release

1. "Born Is The King (It's Christmas) (Scott Ligertwood, Matt Crocker) – 3:17
2. "Do You Hear What I Hear" – 4:24
3. "For All The World" (Kyle Wayne Lee, Michael Farren) – 3:57
4. "O Come All Ye Faithful" – 3:44
5. "God Rest Ye Merry Gentlemen/We Three Kings" – 3:28
6. "The First Noel" – 3:35
7. "God Bless Us" (Scott Krippayne, Jeff Peabody) – 3:35
8. Suddenly (Randy Phillips, Jimmy Fedd, Matthew West) – 5:04
9. "A Night of Hope" (Geron Davis, Dan Dean) – 3:49
10. "Jingle Bells (Duck Mix)" – 1:45

Total Length: 36:34

== Credits ==
Phillips Craig & Dean

- Randy Phillips – lead vocals (1–10), backing vocals
- Dan Dean – lead vocals (1–9), backing vocals
- Shawn Craig – lead vocals (2–8), backing vocals

Musicians

- Nathan Nockels – keyboards, programming, acoustic guitars, electric guitars
- Gabe Scott – programming, accordion, acoustic guitars, bouzouki, dulcimer
- Jason Hoard – electric guitars
- Chris Brink – bass
- Jacob Arnold – drums

Production

- Nathan Nockels – producer, recording
- Jim Dineen – recording
- Tom Laune – mixing
- Dave McNair – mastering

== Singles ==
Year	Song	Peak chart position		
Year	Song	Christian Songs	Soft AC/Inspirational	INSPO
2010	"For All The World"	17	16	10
2010	"Do You Hear What I Hear"	31	20	—
"—" denotes the single didn't chart.
