= Times Like These (Austins Bridge album) =

Studio album by Austins Bridge
- Released: May 4, 2010
- Genres: Country; CCM
- Length: 38:12
- Label: Daywind Records
- Producer: Jay DeMarcus

Austins Bridge chronology
Live at Oak Tree (2009)	Times Like These (2010)

Times Like These is the third album from the Christian country music band Austins Bridge. It was released on May 4, 2010.

== Track listing ==
No.	Title	Writer(s)	Length
1.	"Angels"	Jay DeMarcus; Monty Powell	3:41
2.	"Mercy Never Leaves"	Barry Weeks; Joel Lindsey	3:32
3.	"There Is a God"	Ashley Gorley; Chris DuBois	3:51
4.	"Quitters"	Wendell Lee Mobley; Neil Thrasher; George Canyon	4:17
5.	"Big Sky"	Jennifer Schott; Marty Dodson; Dany Orton	4:52
6.	"Times Like These"	Jay DeMarcus; Monty Powell	3:37
7.	"Dash Between the Dates"	Justin Rivers; Tony Wood; Don Poythress	3:23
8.	"Love Is On the Way"	Danny Myrick; Jennifer Kennard	4:09
9.	"Hold on to Jesus"	Justin Rivers; Jason Baird	3:19
10.	"Good Time"	Justin Rivers; Jason Baird	3:31
Total length:			38:12

== Awards ==
The album was nominated for a GMA Dove Award for Country Album of the Year at the 42nd GMA Dove Awards.
