= Holy South Worldwide =

Mr. Del Presents Holy South World Wide

Compilation album by Mr. Del
- Released: August 3, 2004
- Recorded: 2000–2004
- Genre: Crunk, Southern hip hop, Christian hip hop
- Length: 59:59
- Label: Holy South
- Producer: Mr. Del

Mr. Del chronology
Da Takeover (2003)	Mr. Del Presents Holy South World Wide (2004)	The Future (2005)

Mr. Del Presents Holy South World Wide is the second compilation album by Memphis Christian Rap artist Mr. Del. It was released on August 3, 2004 and includes appearances by Lisa Kimmey of Out Of Eden, Salt from Salt N Pepa, Euclid of Public Announcement, and more.

== Track listing ==
1. Worldwide [Performed by W.O.G.]
2. Take It 2 Da Streetz [Performed by W.O.G.]
3. Talk About Love [Performed by Lisa Kimmey of Out Of Eden]
4. Da Truth [Performed by Mr. Del]
5. Shine'N [Performed by Mr. Del]
6. ABC [Performed by Willie Will]
7. I Found Love [Performed by Willie Will]
8. Party Wit Me [Performed by Avail]
9. Holy Ghost Soldier [Performed by Mr. Del]
10. H'z Up [Performed by W.O.G.]
11. TN [Performed by W.O.G.]
12. Told Cha [Performed by Mr. Del]
13. Holy Matrimony [Performed by Mr. Del]
14. Step On [Performed by Euclid of Public Announcement]
15. Shine [Remix] [Performed by Mr. Del Featuring Salt of Salt N Pepa]
16. Outro [Performed by Mr. Del]
