= Two Hands (song) =

Single by Jars of Clay

from the album The Long Fall Back to Earth
- Released: February 2009
- Recorded: 2008–2009
- Genre: Rock, new wave revival
- Length: 4:26
- Label: Essential
- Songwriters: Dan Haseltine, Charlie Lowell, Stephen Mason, Matt Odmark, Gabe Ruschival and Jeremy Lutito
- Producer: Jars of Clay

Jars of Clay singles chronology
"Closer" (2008)	"Two Hands" (2009)	"Heaven" (2009)

"Two Hands" is a song written and performed by Jars of Clay. It is the first radio single from their 2009 studio album, The Long Fall Back to Earth. A remix of the song was available in the iTunes limited-edition version of the album.

== Music video ==
The music video for "Two Hands" features video footage from the band's trip to Kenya mixed with video of the band performing the song first in a library/office, then later in a high-rise building. Touring band members Gabe Ruschival and Jeremy Lutito appear with the band in the video.

== Other appearances ==
The song also makes an appearance on WOW Hits 2010.

== Charts ==
- Hot Christian Songs: No. 6

== Awards ==
In 2010, the song was nominated for a Dove Award for Song of the Year at the 41st GMA Dove Awards.
