= Fearless (Phillips, Craig and Dean album) =

Studio album by Phillips, Craig and Dean
- Released: August 4, 2009
- Genres: Contemporary Christian, contemporary worship
- Length: 44:00
- Label: INO
- Producer: Bernie Herms

Phillips, Craig and Dean chronology
Favorite Live Songs of All (2007)	Fearless (2009)	Hope for All the World (2010)

Singles from Fearless
- 1. "Revelation Song" Released: May 5, 2009; 2. "Great Are You Lord" Released: April 30, 2010; 3. "From the Inside Out" Released: 2011

Fearless is the eleventh studio album from Contemporary Christian group Phillips, Craig and Dean. It was released on August 4, 2009, and won a Dove Award for 'Inspirational Album of the Year' at the 41st annual GMA Dove Awards.

== Concept ==
Randy Phillips explained how they found the album's theme:

“We were talking about how afraid our church members are today. A look at your finances right now might mean kids who wanted to go to college can't, and so on. The fear that brings can be paralyzing... But then we asked ourselves, Shouldn't believers who have the heart of eternity in them be different? That's where we found our theme; fear less, hope more.”

Shawn Craig explained his view of the album's message:

“Fearless is a statement against the current level of anxiety that's being sold by the loudest voices in our culture... But I've also been inspired by the stories of Christians in parts of India. A missionary our church supports tells us about many who are baptized there in spite of being shunned by family or even endangering their live. That's being fearless. We all need that kind of courage.”

== Songs/Style ==
The first track on the album, "Counting on God", a pop worship song written by Jared Anderson, is paraphrased by Randy Phillips as "Get out of the funk. Embrace life! Run headlong into it. Start counting on God." Album producer Bernie Herms wanted Phillips to "Get in the microphone and growl" and had him singing through a magazine to produce a vocal effect.

When explaining the meaning of "Revelation Song", Randy Phillips stated that it “captures the moment of looking up into Heaven, peeling back the curtain of eternity so we can peek in. If you keep your eyes on the Dow Jones or nuclear weapons in North Korea, you’ll always be nervous. Look to the awesomeness of God instead.” The song was written by Jennie Lee Riddle.

Another song on the album, "Let God Be God", was written by Dan Dean in response to global instability. Dean stated that "This is the perfect time for us to say, Don't panic. God is in control. Jesus asks in Luke 12:25: Who of you by worrying can add a single hour to his life?" One of the edgier songs the band has recorded, the song even has a James Brown scream, which Dean originally recorded to be funny, but it eventually stuck.

"The Distance", an original song written by Shawn Craig, is explained by him as "The idea is that God couldn't stand the distance between us, so He came near. There's a bit of hyperbole in that, but the principle is true. God shows His love in spanning the canyon between mankind and Himself with the humble cross. I feel as strongly about that lyric as any I've written."

"Nothing to Prove", an adult contemporary song, was written by Dan Dean in response to the death of a close friend and church member's father. "I'll never forget the morning he called and said, 'My dad is gone,'" Dean recalled. "It was brilliant and sad, and I went into the chapel with a heavy heart asking God what I could do, and out came this song with words that I hope can be said about me someday."

Randy Phillips also explained the message and style of "Spirit Of God Is Here". "If you love golf, talking to Tiger Woods would be an honor. If it were politics, maybe you'd enjoy speaking with President Obama. But to talk to God! That's amazing. And musically, Bernie gives the song some Coldplay cool."

== Reception ==
Professional ratings
Review scores
Source	Rating
Christian Music Review	(8.9/10 B+) link

Fearless was received positively by CCM fans, selling over 10,000 units during its first week of release, peaking at no. 1 on the Hot Christian Albums chart and no. 49 on the Billboard 200, both career highs for Phillips, Craig and Dean.

Fearless was also received positively by critics. Kevin Davis of Christian Music Review gave the album a B+, commenting that he particularly enjoyed “Counting On God”, “From The Inside Out”, “Revelation Song” and “The Distance”.

=== Singles ===
The album's first single, "Revelation Song", was released digitally on May 5, 2009. It was successful on the charts, reaching no. 1 on Billboard's Christian Songs and Christian AC charts, spending over 10 weeks at the top on both. It also had a run on the iTunes Christian Singles chart, reaching no. 1 on it as well. The song won a Dove Award for 'Worship Song of the Year' at the 2010 Dove Awards, at which it was performed live by Phillips, Craig and Dean and Kari Jobe.

"Great Are You Lord" was released as the second single of the album on April 30, 2010. It has currently peaked at No. 1 on the Soft AC/INSPO Chart, holding the spot for 3 weeks, 19 on the Christian AC chart, and 22 on the Hot Christian Songs chart. After dropping out of the main Soft AC/INSPO chart, it also peaked at no. 1 on the Soft AC/INSPO recurrent chart.

"From The Inside Out" was released as the third single from the album, peaking at No. 39 on the Christian Songs chart and No. 2 on the Soft AC/INSPO Chart, their third top 5 single from the album. In addition, an album cut, 'Nothing to Prove', spent one week on the Soft AC/INSPO chart, peaking at No. 16.

== Track listing ==
Album release
No.	Title	Writer(s)	Length
1.	"Counting on God"	Jared Anderson	3:54
2.	"From the Inside Out"	Joel Houston	4:48
3.	"Revelation Song"	Jennie Lee Riddle	5:53
4.	"The Distance"	Shawn Craig, Bernie Herms	4:13
5.	"When Grace Walks In"	Craig, Sam Mizell	4:20
6.	"Spirit of God Is Here"	Randy Phillips, Paul Baloche	3:56
7.	"Nothing to Prove"	Dan Dean	4:35
8.	"Let God Be God"	Dean, Herms	4:09
9.	"Great Are You Lord"	James Rueger, Tony Wood	4:43
10.	"Name Above All Names"	Steve Sharp, Barry Weeks, Bryan Brown	3:32
Total length:			44:00

== Personnel ==
Phillips, Craig and Dean

- Randy Phillips – lead vocals (1, 3, 6, 9, 10), backing vocals
- Shawn Craig – lead vocals (1, 4–6, 9), backing vocals
- Dan Dean – lead vocals (2–4, 6–10), backing vocals

Musicians

- Bernie Herms – keyboards (1, 2, 4, 6, 8–10), acoustic piano (3, 4, 8), programming (8)
- Jason Webb – keyboards (2, 3, 6, 9), Wurlitzer electric piano (5), acoustic piano (7)
- Adam Lester – guitars (1–3, 5–10), electric guitars (4)
- Chris Graffagnio – guitars (2, 5)
- Trevor Morgan – acoustic guitars (4)
- Chris Rodriguez – mandolin (7)
- Tony Lucido – bass (1, 3, 8, 10)
- Joey Canaday – bass (2, 5–7, 9)
- James Gregory – bass (4)
- Dan Needham – drums (1, 3, 4, 8, 10)
- Scott Williamson – drums (2, 5–7, 9)

Choir on "Revelation Song"

- Maurice Carter
- Anthony Evans
- Missi Hale
- Shelly Justice
- Leanne Palmore
- Nirva Ready
- Michelle Swift
- Terry White
- Jovaun Woods

== Production ==
- Producer – Bernie Herms for SoulFuel Productions
- A&R – James Rueger
- Recorded at Platinum Lab and Warner Bros. Studios (Nashville, TN); Randall Technologies (Franklin, TN).
- Recording – Joe Baldridge and Danny Duncan
- Assistant engineers – Travis Brigman, Dustin Lefholz and Joe Martino.
- Vocals recorded at SoulFuel Studios (Brentwood, TN) and Randall Technologies.
- Vocals recorded by Bernie Herms and Billy Whittington, assisted by Dustin Lefholz and Charlie Valley.
- Digital editing – Jeff Cain
- Tracks #1–6 & 8–10 mixed by Craig Alvin, assisted by Jeff Pillar.
- Track #7 mixed by Justin Niebank, assisted by Drew Bollman.
- Mastered by Andrew Mendelson at Georgetown Masters (Nashville, TN).
- Production manager – Ken Johnson
- Design and cover by Sakura Reese for Saksgraphics.
- Packaging by Dan Harding at Blue Mile Design.
- Creative director – Dana Salsedo
- Photography – Michael Gomez
- Wardrobe styling – Joseph Cassell
- Hair and make-up – Tina Davis

== Chart positions ==
=== Album ===
Chart (2009)	Peak position
Billboard 200	46
Billboard Top Christian Albums	1

=== Singles/Charting Songs ===
Year	Song	Peak chart position		
Year	Song	Christian Songs	Soft AC/Inspirational	Christian AC Monitored
2009	"Revelation Song"	1	1	1
2010	"Great Are You Lord"	19	1	17
2011	"Nothing To Prove"	–	16	–
2011	"From The Inside Out"	39	2	–

- ^{1} Reached #1 on other charts
