= Searchlights (album) =

Studio album by Abandon
- Released: August 25, 2009
- Studios: FabMusic (Franklin, Tennessee)
- Genre: Christian rock
- Length: 46:48
- Label: ForeFront
- Producer: Christopher Stevens

Abandon chronology
| Abandon II EP (2009) | Searchlights (2009) | Control (2011) |

Professional ratings
Review scores
| Source | Rating |
|---|---|
| Jesus Freak Hideout | 3.5/5 stars |
| Soul-Audio | 9.5/10 stars |

Searchlights is the first full-length album by Christian rock band Abandon. The album was released on August 25, 2009 through ForeFront Records.

== Background ==
Abandon had released two full-length albums as an independent band (Ambush and Who You Are), before being signed to Christian music label, ForeFront Records in 2007. Since being signed to ForeFront Records, Abandon has released two EPs, which feature songs that are on Searchlights. The first single off their first EP, "Providence", reached #7 on R&R's Christian rock charts. The song "Hold On", originally released as a single, was #1 for multiple weeks.

== Track listing (U.S.) ==
| No. | Title | Writer(s) | Length |
|---|---|---|---|
| 1. | "Hold On" | Abandon | 3:52 |
| 2. | "Song for the Broken" | Abandon | 4:08 |
| 3. | "Confession" | Abandon, Christopher Stevens | 4:01 |
| 4. | "Be Alive in Me" | Abandon, Stevens, Justin York | 3:33 |
| 5. | "Here We Are Now" | Abandon, Allen Salmon | 3:50 |
| 6. | "Providence" | Abandon | 3:25 |
| 7. | "City Lights" | Abandon | 4:17 |
| 8. | "Safe in Your Arms" | Abandon, Stevens | 3:59 |
| 9. | "Atmosphere" | Abandon | 4:19 |
| 10. | "Here Waiting" | Abandon | 3:55 |
| 11. | "Your Love Lifts Me Up" | Abandon, Stevens, Kevin Bruchert | 3:45 |
| 12. | "Hero" | Abandon, Stevens, York | 3:44 |

== Track listing (Japan) ==
| No. | Title | Writer(s) | Length |
|---|---|---|---|
| 1. | "Hold On" | | 3:52 |
| 2. | "Be Alive in Me" | | 3:33 |
| 3. | "Song for the Broken" | | 4:08 |
| 4. | "Providence" | | 3:25 |
| 5. | "City Lights" | | 4:17 |
| 6. | "Gold" | | 4:28 |
| 7. | "If I Could Write a Song" | | 5:05 |
| 8. | "All Because of You" | Abandon, Ben Glover | 3:52 |
| 9. | "Here Waiting" | | 3:55 |
| 10. | "Atmosphere" | | 4:19 |
| 11. | "Your Love Lifts Me Up" | | 3:45 |
| 12. | "Hero" | | 3:44 |
| 13. | "Safe in Your Arms" | | 3:59 |

== Awards ==
In 2010, the album was nominated for a Dove Award for Rock Album of the Year at the 41st GMA Dove Awards.

== Personnel ==
Abandon

- Josh Engler – lead vocals
- Justin Engler – rhythm guitars
- Stevan Vela – lead guitars
- Bryan Fowler – bass
- Dave Vela – drums

Additional musicians

- Christopher Stevens – keyboards, programming, backing vocals
- Claire Indie – cello

=== Production ===
- Christopher York – A&R
- Christopher Stevens – producer, mixing
- Kevin Powell – assistant engineer, editing
- Jess Chambers – A&R administration
- Jan Cook – creative director
- Katie Moore – art direction
- Christian Rios – photography
