= Austins Bridge (album) =

Studio album by Austins Bridge
- Released: February 27, 2007
- Genre: Country; CCM
- Label: Daywind Records
- Producer: Bubba Smith

Austins Bridge chronology
Austins Bridge (2007)	Live at Oak Tree (2009)

Austins Bridge is the debut album from the band of the same name, which was released on February 27, 2007.

== Critical reception ==
Crosswalk writes, "Austins Bridge is as country and Southern gospel as you can get, and then some."

== Track listing ==
No.	Title	Writer(s)	Length
1.	"He Will Carry You"	Justin Rivers; Aaron Crabb	3:08
2.	"Dry Bones"	Traditional	2:48
3.	"His Burden's Light"	Justin Rivers; Jason Baird	2:48
4.	"He's in Control"	Justin Rivers; Mike Kofahl; John Rowsey	5:17
5.	"I Am Free"	Justin Rivers	3:24
6.	"This Is Love"	Buddy Mullins; Joel Huggins; Mark Willett; Matt Huesmann; Westley Willett	4:02
7.	"I See Daylight"	Justin Rivers; Annie McRae	2:50
8.	"Life's Too Short"	Chris Binion; John Colgin	4:17
9.	"Native American Prayer"	Mohican chant and prayer	0:18
10.	"History Turned the Page"	Gerald Crabb	3:03
11.	"What I Still Believe"	Justin Rivers; Annie McRae	3:49
12.	"Jesus, You Are"	Justin Rivers	2:42
Total length:			38:26

== Awards ==
In 2008, the album was nominated for a Dove Award for Country Album of the Year at the 39th GMA Dove Awards. The song "He's In Control" won a Dove Award for Bluegrass Recorded Song of the Year that same year.
