= Top of My Lungs =

Studio album by Phillips, Craig and Dean
- Released: September 16, 2006
- Studio: Sound Kitchen and Antenna Studios (Franklin, Tennessee); Berwick Lane (Atlanta, Georgia); SoundTown Digital (Fort Worth, Texas)
- Genre: Contemporary Christian, Contemporary Worship
- Length: 43:42
- Label: INO Records
- Producer: Nathan Nockels

Phillips, Craig and Dean chronology
The Ultimate Collection (2006)	Top of My Lungs (2006)	Greatest Hits (2007)

Top of My Lungs is the tenth studio album from contemporary Christian group Phillips, Craig and Dean. It was released through INO Records on September 16, 2006. The album features the radio hit singles, "Saved the Day", "Your Name", and "Top of My Lungs".

== Track listing ==
No.	Title	Writer(s)	Length
1.	"One Way"	Joel Houston, Johnathan Douglas	3:48
2.	"Your Name"	Paul Baloche, Glenn Packiam	4:00
3.	"Top of My Lungs"	Tony Wood, Jim Odom, Ryan Wingo	4:10
4.	"Saved the Day"	Michael Neale	4:23
5.	"Amazed"	Jared Anderson	4:20
6.	"I Will Boast"	Baloche	3:52
7.	"Because of that Blood"	Randy Phillips, Mark Harris	3:33
8.	"Let the Redeemed"	Dan Dean, Roger Hodges	4:14
9.	"That's My Lord"	Shawn Craig, Hodges	3:28
10.	"For Your Glory" (Matt Maher Cover)	Matt Maher	3:55
11.	"Tis So Sweet" (hidden track, ft. Danielle Dean, Devin Dean, Garland Phillips)	Traditional	3:59
Total length:			43:42

== Credits ==
Phillips, Craig and Dean

- Randy Phillips – lead vocals (1, 2, 4, 5, 7, 10), backing vocals
- Shawn Craig – lead vocals (1, 3–5, 9, 10), backing vocals
- Dan Dean – lead vocals (1–10), backing vocals

Musicians

- Nathan Nockels – acoustic piano, keyboards, programming, acoustic guitars, electric guitars, backing vocals
- Jeremy Bose – programming (2, 3, 8, 9)
- Jason Hoard – electric guitars
- Gary Burnette – electric guitar overdubs
- Mark Hill – bass
- Dan Needham – drums
- Tom Howard – string arrangements and conductor (2–5)
- The Nashville String Machine – strings (2–5)
- Laura Ball, Matthew Ball, Kimberly Burr, Chase Ezell, Don Garrett, Joy Kayser, Anne Kayser, Kara Langer, Gabriel Lopez, Nathan Nockels, Stephen Proctor, Sarah Schatz and Denise Tabscott – choir (4, 7)
- Devin Dean, Garland Phillips and Danielle Dean – all vocals (11)

== Production ==
- James Rueger – A&R
- Nathan Nockels – producer, overdub recording
- Joe Baldridge – tracking engineer, choir engineer (4, 7)
- Todd Robbins – string engineer (2–5)
- Steve Beers – tracking assistant, assistant string engineer (2–5)
- Kenzi Butler – tracking assistant
- Darrell Lehman – assistant choir engineer (4, 7)
- Chris Clayton – additional engineer (8)
- David Parker – additional engineer (8)
- Tom Laune – mixing at Bridgeway Studios (Nashville, Tennessee)
- Andrew Mendelson – mastering at Georgetown Masters (Nashville, Tennessee)
- Alicia Lewis – production coordinator
- Jay Smith/Jukebox Designs – design
- Dana Salsedo – creative director
- Michael Gomez – photography
- Joseph Cassell – wardrobe styling
- Tina Davis – hair, make-up

== Chart positions ==
Chart	Peak position
US Billboard 200	181
US Billboard Top Christian Albums	12
US Billboard Heatseekers Albums	10

== Awards ==
In 2007, the album was nominated for a Dove Award for Praise & Worship Album of the Year at the 38th GMA Dove Awards.
