= What Life Would Be Like =

Studio album by Big Daddy Weave
- Released: July 22, 2008
- Studio: Vibe 56 and Pentavarit (Nashville, Tennessee); Red 91 Productions (Mt. Juliet, Tennessee); Shmowland Studios (Brentwood, Tennessee); LiveHorns.com Studio (Mobile, Alabama); The Field (Pensacola, Florida)
- Genre: Contemporary Christian music, Christian rock
- Length: 43:55
- Label: Fervent
- Producer: Jeremy Redmon; Christopher Stevens; Bryan White

Big Daddy Weave chronology
Every Time I Breathe (2007)	What Life Would Be Like (2008)	Christ Is Come (2009)

Professional ratings
Review scores
Source	Rating
Cross Rhythms	8/10 stars
Jesus Freak Hideout	4.5/5 stars
New Release Tuesday	4.5/5 stars

What Life Would Be Like is the fifth studio album by Christian rock band Big Daddy Weave. It was released on July 22, 2008. The album charted at no. 15 on the Billboard's chart on August 9, 2008 in the Christian Albums category.

== Track listing ==
What Life Would Be Like
No.	Title	Writer(s)	Length
1.	"You Found Me"	Dave Gillette, Jay Weaver, Mike Weaver	4:41
2.	"What Life Would Be Like"	Don Chaffer, Mike Weaver	4:06
3.	"We Want the World to Hear"	Chris Kuti	4:21
4.	"Revive Us Again"	Mike Weaver (arrangement)	4:19
5.	"Blue Skies"	Andy Cloninger, Jay Weaver, Mike Weaver	3:32
6.	"Another Day in Paradise"	Phil Collins	6:14
7.	"Right with You"	Andy Gullahorn, Jay Weaver, Mike Weaver	4:09
8.	"Falling into You"	Jeff Jones, Mike Weaver	3:20
9.	"From Here"	Mark Schultz, Mike Weaver	4:30
10.	"Just Like Somebody Else"	Mike Weaver	4:44

== Personnel ==
Big Daddy Weave

- Mike Weaver – lead vocals, acoustic guitars, backing vocals
- Jeremy Redmon – electric guitars, mandolin, programming, backing vocals
- Joe Shirk – keyboards, saxophone,
- Jay Weaver – bass,
- Jeff Jones – drums

Additional musicians

- Matt Gilder – keyboards
- Dan Dugmore – dobro (6), mandolin (6)
- Lauren Morris – strings (4, 9)
- Matt Nelson – strings (4, 9), string arrangements (4, 9)
- Emily Walsh – strings (4, 9)
- Claire Whitcomb – strings (4, 9)
- Lee Barren – trombone (10)
- Rodney Mills – trombone (10)
- Tommy Vaughan – trumpet (10), horn arrangements (10)
- Anna Redmon – backing vocals
- David Leonard – backing vocals

=== Production ===
- Josh Bailey – executive producer
- Susan Riley – executive producer
- Jeremy Redmon – producer, overdub recording
- Christopher Stevens – co-producer (2)
- Bryan White – co-producer (9), overdub recording (9)
- Shane D. Wilson – engineer, mixing
- Scott Velazco – assistant engineer
- Sarah Deane – mix coordinator
- Greg Klimetz – bass recording (6, 7, 9)
- Mark Drury – drum editing
- Andrew Mendelson – mastering at Georgetown Masters (Nashville, Tennessee)
- Jason Jenkins – A&R administration
- Katherine Petillo – creative director
- Roy Roper – design
- Ben Pearson – photography
- Robin Geary – personal stylist
- Kim Perrett – wardrobe stylist
