= Now Is Not Forever =

Studio album by B. Reith
- Released: September 22, 2009
- Genre: Hip hop, rap, pop
- Length: 43:46
- Label: Gotee

B. Reith chronology
The Forecast (EP) (2009)	Now Is Not Forever (2009)	How The Story Ends (2011)

Professional ratings
Review scores
Source	Rating
Jesus Freak Hideout	4/5 stars
Allmusic	(?)

Now Is Not Forever is the first full-length album from Christian hip-hop artist B. Reith. It was released on September 22, 2009, through Gotee Records.

== Track listing ==
All songs written by Brian Reith except where noted.

1. "Intro (Excuse Me Everybody)" - 1:02
2. "The Comeback Kid" - 3:43
3. "I Know" - 3:22
4. "Mess" - 3:50
5. "Antidote" - 4:07
6. "My Story" - 3:20
7. "U Should Know" - 3:46
8. "Wish That" - 4:13
9. "Old School" (Brian Reith, Dave HuYoung) - 3:07
10. "Rain Down" - 5:03
11. "Just For You" - 4:02
12. "Breathe" - 4:18

== Awards ==
The album was nominated for a Dove Award for Rap/Hip-Hop Album of the Year at the 41st GMA Dove Awards. In 2009, a music video for the song "The Comeback Kid" was released.

== Chart performance ==
The album peaked at #2 on the Top R&B/Hip-Hop Albums list. The song "Antidote" peaked at #50 on Billboard's list of Christian Songs.
