= Live at Oak Tree (Austins Bridge album) =

Live album by Austins Bridge
- Released: 2009
- Genre: Country; CCM
- Label: Daywind Records

Austins Bridge chronology
Austins Bridge (2007)	Live at Oak Tree (2009)	Times Like These (2010)

Live at Oak Tree is a live album from the Christian country band Austins Bridge, and part of the Live at Oak Tree series from Daywind Records. The album features a behind-the-scenes look at the presentation of the band to record live at the Oak Tree studio in Tennessee. It was released in 2009.

== Track listing ==
1. "Dry Bones"
2. "I See Daylight"
3. "I Am Free"
4. "Jesus, You Are"
5. "Hold On To Jesus"
6. "Dash Between the Dates"
7. "He Will Carry You"
8. "Learned How To Live"
9. "Oh, How Marvelous"
10. "It Is Well"
11. "I'll Fly Away"

== Awards ==
The album was nominated to two Dove Awards for Country Album of the Year and Long Form Music Video of the Year at the 41st GMA Dove Awards. Also, the songs "Dry Bones" and "Hold On To Jesus" were respectively nominated for Country Recorded Song of the Year and Inspirational Recorded Song of the Year.
