= Lifeline (Phillips, Craig and Dean album) =

Studio album by Phillips, Craig and Dean
- Released: January 24, 1994
- Recorded: 1993
- Genre: Contemporary Christian
- Length: 45:49
- Label: Star Song
- Producer: Paul Mills, Brian Green

Phillips, Craig and Dean chronology
Phillips, Craig and Dean (1992)	Lifeline (1994)	Trust (1995)

Lifeline is Phillips, Craig and Dean's second album. Two singles, "Concert of the Age" and "I Want to Be Just Like You", were released to Christian radio. Both songs, along with "He'll Do Whatever It Takes" and "Build a Bridge of Love", were included on Favorite Songs of All. In addition, "Concert of the Age" was included in WOW 1996.

== Track listing ==
No.	Title	Writer(s)	Length
1.	"Concert of the Age"	Geoff Thurman, Jeoffrey Benward	4:20
2.	"A Friend Called Grace"	Dan Dean, Randy Phillips	4:36
3.	"He'll Do Whatever It Takes"	Dean	4:56
4.	"He Believes In Lost Causes"	Dwight Lyles, Michael Puryear	4:01
5.	"I Want To Be Just Like You"	Dean, Joy Becker	5:32
6.	"Can I Get A Witness"	G. Thurman, Becky Thurman	4:01
7.	"Strong Determination"	Shawn Craig, Lyles	5:08
8.	"Build a Bridge of Love"	Phillips, Jeff Switzer	4:51
9.	"When The Walls Come Down"	Craig, John Mandeville, Ty Lacy	4:44
10.	"Will You Love Jesus More"	Craig, Mandeville	4:50
Total length:			45:49

== Personnel ==
Phillips, Craig and Dean

- Randy Phillips – lead vocals (tracks 1, 6, 8), backing vocals
- Shawn Craig – lead vocals (tracks 1, 4, 7, 9), backing vocals
- Dan Dean – lead vocals (tracks 1, 2, 3, 5, 10), backing vocals

Musicians

- Brian Green – keyboards, programming, strings
- Paul Mills – additional keyboards and programming
- Phil Madeira – Hammond B3 organ
- Mark Baldwin – guitars
- Jerry McPherson – guitars
- Jimmie Lee Sloas – bass guitar
- Mark Hammond – drums, percussion, drum programming
- Carl Marsh – horns (track 1)
- Bobby Taylor – English horn (track 3)
- Sam Levine – saxophones (track 6)
- Mark Douthit – saxophone overdubs (track 7)
- Chris McDonald – trombone and brass arrangements (track 6)
- Barry Green – trombone (track 6)
- Mike Haynes – trumpet (track 6)
- Additional background vocals – Lisa Bevill, Guy Penrod, Chris Rodriguez, Michael Black, Michael Mellett, and Tom McCain
- Choir (track 6) – The Music City Mass Choir
- Children choir (track 8) – Kid Connection Music
- Janet McMahon-Wilson – choir contractor (track 8)

=== Production ===
- Produced by Paul Mills
- Co-produced by Brian Green
- Executive Producer – Jackie Patillo
- Engineers – Lynn Fuston, Steve Dady, and Paul Mills.
- Assistant Engineers – Dave Dillbeck and Todd Robbins
- Recorded at RTC Studio, Castlebury Productions, The Saltmine and North Beach Studio (Franklin, TN); OmniSound Studios (Nashville, TN).
- Mixed by Lynn Fuston at North Beach Studio.
- Mastered by Hank Williams at MasterMix (Nashville, TN).
- Production Coordination – Chad Williams and Scott Brickell at Chapel Hill Management.
- Art Direction and Design – Brian Dominey
- Creative Direction – Toni Thigpen
- Photography – Russ Harrington
- A&R – Vicki Dvoracek
