= Aleluia =

Live album by Diante do Trono
- Released: 17 September 2010
- Recorded: 17 July 2010, Cowboy Park Barretos, Barretos, São Paulo, Brazil (60,000 people present)
- Genre: Contemporary worship music
- Length: 71:45 (CD) and 129:28 (DVD & blu-ray)
- Label: Som Livre
- Producer: Diante do Trono

Diante do Trono Live Praise & Worship chronology
Tua Visão (2009)	Aleluia (2010)	Sol da Justiça (2011)

Aleluia is the thirteenth album in the live praise and worship series of contemporary worship music by Diante do Trono.

== Background ==
In the pre-recording of the Aleluia, the mining group released the Tua Visão album, recorded at the Station Square, in Belo Horizonte.

Aleluia was recorded with an audience of over 60,000 in the arena and over 150,000 people present. It was recorded at the Cowboy Park Barretos in Barretos, on July 17, 2010.

The album sold more than 230,000 copies so getting Triple Platinum Disc was the best-selling gospel album of 2010. Charting hits in churches throughout Brazil as "Aleluia", "Oleiro", "Me Refaz" and "Canção do Apocalipse".

== Track listings ==
=== CD ===
Song	Author	Worship Leader	Duration
Aleluia	Ana Paula Valadão	Ana Paula Valadão	5:51
Este é o Dia	Ana Paula Valadão	Ana Paula Valadão	3:47
Por Tudo Que Tu és	Ana Paula Valadão	Ana Paula Valadão	5:21
Digno de Adoração	Ana Paula Valadão	André Valadão	4:52
Glória	Ana Paula Valadão	Ana Nóbrega	4:25
Oleiro	Ana Paula Valadão	Ana Paula Valadão	9:33
Me Refaz	Ana Paula Valadão	Ana Paula Valadão	1:31
És o Deus Que Me Cura	Ana Paula Valadão	Ana Paula Valadão	5:33
Eis-me Aqui	Ana Paula Valadão	Ana Paula Valadão & Ludmila Ferber	5:08
Eu Vou Prosseguir	Ana Paula Valadão	Ana Paula Valadão & Ludmila Ferber	2:21
Por Ti Eu Existo	Ana Paula Valadão	Israel Salazar	4:48
Espírito Santo	Ana Paula Valadão	Ana Paula Valadão	6:58
Meu Redentor Vive	Ana Paula Valadão	Ana Paula Valadão	4:54
Canção do Apocalipse	Jennie Lee Riddle (translated version by Ana Paula Valadão)	Ana Paula Valadão	7:17

=== DVD ===
Song	Worship Leader
Aleluia	Ana Paula Valadão
Este é o Dia	Ana Paula Valadão
Por Tudo Que Tu és	Ana Paula Valadão
Digno de Adoração	André Valadão
Glória	Ana Nóbrega
Oleiro	Ana Paula Valadão
Me Refaz	Ana Paula Valadão
És o Deus Que Me Cura	Ana Paula Valadão
Testemunho Eis-me Aqui	Ana Paula Valadão
Eis-me Aqui	Ana Paula Valadão & Ludmila Ferber
Ministração Pra. Ludmila Ferber	Ludmila Ferber
Eu Vou Prosseguir	Ana Paula Valadão & Ludmila Ferber
Por Ti Eu Existo	Israel Salazar
Espírito Santo	Ana Paula Valadão
Espontâneo Espírito Santo	Ana Paula Valadão
Águas Purificadoras	Ana Paula Valadão & André Valadão
Espontâneo Águas Purificadoras	Ana Paula Valadão & André Valadão
Oração Pela Nação	Pr. Márcio Valadão
Manancial	Ana Paula Valadão & André Valadão
Meu Redentor Vive	Ana Paula Valadão
Canção do Apocalipse	Ana Paula Valadão
O Espírito e a Noiva Dizem: Vem	Ana Paula Valadão
