= Phillips, Craig & Dean (album) =

Phillips, Craig and Dean

Studio album by Phillips, Craig and Dean
- Released: September 17, 1992
- Recorded: 1992
- Genre: CCM, Gospel
- Length: 45:20
- Label: Star Song
- Producer: Paul Mills

Phillips, Craig and Dean chronology
Phillips, Craig and Dean (1992)	Lifeline (1994)

Phillips, Craig and Dean is Phillips, Craig and Dean's self-titled debut album, released on September 17, 1992. The songs "Turn Up the Radio" and "Favorite Song of All" were released as singles. Both of those songs, as well as "Midnight Oil", "This Is the Life" and "Little Bit of Morning", were included on their greatest hits album Favorite Songs of All.

== Track listing ==
No.	Title	Writer(s)	Length
1.	"Turn Up the Radio"	Geoff Thurman	4:04
2.	"This Is the Life"	Shawn Craig, Leonard Ahlstrom	3:37
3.	"He'll Never Let You Go"	Craig	5:03
4.	"Favorite Song of All"	Dan Dean	4:30
5.	"Midnight Oil"	Craig, Joy Becker	4:45
6.	"In Heaven"	Wayne Berry, Thurman	4:44
7.	"Little Bit of Morning"	Randy Phillips, Dwight Liles	4:34
8.	"For a Dream"	Dean	5:46
9.	"Take Me to Jesus"	Phillips	4:00
10.	"It Wasn't in the Thunder"	Phillips, Craig	4:14
Total length:			45:20

== Personnel ==
Phillips, Craig & Dean

- Randy Phillips – lead vocals (6, 7, 9, 10), backing vocals
- Shawn Craig – lead vocals (2, 3, 5, 6), backing vocals
- Dan Dean – lead vocals (1, 4, 5, 6, 8), backing vocals

Musicians

- Paul Mills – keyboards, bass programming, additional drums and percussion programming (1, 3); additional keyboards, bass and percussion programming (2, 4–10)
- Brian Green – keyboards and bass programming (2, 4–10)
- Jerry McPherson – acoustic and electric guitars
- Michael Hodge – acoustic guitar (10)
- Mark Hammond – drums and percussion programming
- Sam Levine – saxophones (1)
- Marty Paoletta – saxophone (10)
- Chris McDonald – trombone (1), brass arrangements (1)
- Mike Haynes – trumpet (1)
- George Tidwell – trumpet (1)
- Chris Rodriguez – backing vocals
- Guy Penrod – backing vocals (1, 3)
- Chris Eaton – backing vocals (2, 4–10)
- Gail Mayes – backing vocals (6)

== Production ==
- Executive Producer – Jackie Patillo
- Producer, Engineer and Mixing – Paul Mills
- Recorded and Mixed at RTC Studios (Nashville, TN).
- Brass Engineering on track 1 – Steve Dady at Skylab Studios (Nashville, TN).
- Mastered by Hank Williams at MasterMix (Nashville, TN).
- Production Management – Chad Williams and Scott Brickell at Chapel Hill Management.
- Creative Direction – Toni Thigpen
- Design and Layout – YNO Design
- Photography – Russ Harrington
