= Christ Is Come =

Studio album by Big Daddy Weave
- Released: September 22, 2009
- Studio: Bletchley Park (Nashville, Tennessee); Red 91 Productions (Mt. Juliet, Tennessee); Quimby Productions (Mobile, Alabama)
- Genre: CCM, Rock
- Length: 40:27
- Label: Fervent Records
- Producer: Jeremy Redmon

Big Daddy Weave chronology
What Life Would Be Like (2008)	Christ Is Come (2009)	The Ultimate Collection (2011)

Christ Is Come is an album from Contemporary Christian/Rock band Big Daddy Weave. The album was released on September 22, 2009 through Fervent Records.

== Accolades ==
At the 41st GMA Dove Awards, Christ Is Come won a Dove Award for Christmas Album of the Year.

== Chart performance ==
The album peaked at #5 on Billboard's Holiday Albums.

== Track listing ==
Christ Is Come
No.	Title	Writer(s)	Length
1.	"O Come All Ye Faithful"		4:23
2.	"Joy to the World"		3:21
3.	"Glory"	Gene Burroughs, Jeremy Redmon, Mike Weaver	4:36
4.	"O Come, O Come, Emmanuel"		4:07
5.	"I'll Be Brave This Christmas"	Kandice Weaver, Mike Weaver, Tony Wood	4:16
6.	"Go Tell It On the Mountain"		3:58
7.	"Peace on Earth"	Mike Weaver, Tony Wood	4:51
8.	"Christ Is Come"	Mike Weaver	4:00
9.	"Silent Night"		3:28
10.	"Angels We Have Heard On High"		3:22
Total length:			40:27

== Personnel ==
Big Daddy Weave

- Mike Weaver – lead and backing vocals, acoustic guitars, arrangements
- Jeremy Redmon – keyboards, electric guitars, drum programming, kazoo, arrangements
- Joe Shirk – keyboards, saxophone,
- Jay Weaver – bass guitar
- Jeff Jones – drums

Additional Musicians

- Matt Gilder – keyboards
- Jimmy Olander – banjo, arrangements
- Ken Lewis – percussion
- Matt Nelson – cello
- Anna Redmon – backing vocals
- Toby Friesen – backing vocals, group vocals
- Conrad Johnson – backing vocals, group vocals
- Chris Kuti – backing vocals, group vocals
- David Leonard – backing vocals, group vocals

String Section and Arrangements

- David Angell
- Monisa Angell
- David Davidson
- Saraghani Reist

=== Production ===
- Jeremy Redmon – producer, engineer
- Ben Phillips – engineer
- Jeff Quimby – engineer
- Craig Alvin – mixing
- Andrew Mendelson – mastering at Georgetown Masters (Nashville, Tennessee)
- Natthapol Abhigantaphand – mastering assistant
- Shelley Anderson – mastering assistant
- Daniel Bacigalupi – mastering assistant
- Katherine Petillo – creative director
- Roy Roper – design
- Thomas Petillo – photography
- Robin Geary – grooming
