= Love Prevails =

Studio album by Abandon
- Released: November 4, 2014
- Studio: The Refinery, Farmland Studios, Duncan Sparks Music, Fancy Man and Superphonic Studios (Nashville, Tennessee); Dancing Heart (San Antonio, Texas)
- Genre: Worship, Christian rock, pop rock
- Length: 37:57
- Label: 2TEN
- Producer: Geoff Duncan; Phillip LaRue; Allen Salmon

Abandon chronology
Control (2011)	Love Prevails (2014)

Love Prevails is the third studio album by Abandon. 2TEN Records released the album on November 4, 2014.

== Critical reception ==
Professional ratings
Review scores
Source	Rating
365 Days of Inspiring Media	3.5/5 stars
CCM Magazine	4/5 stars
Christian Music Review	3.8/5
Jesus Freak Hideout	3.5/5 stars 3/5 stars
Worship Leader	4/5 stars

Awarding the album four stars at CCM Magazine, Andy Argyrakis states, "a cutting edge collection". Amanda Furbeck, giving the album four stars from Worship Leader, writes, "put a retro-yet-fresh spin on their musical style". Rating the album three and a half stars by Jesus Freak Hideout, Bert Gangl describes, "Love Prevails doesn't quite ascend to the same rocking, quirky, funk-filled heights as its predecessor...it comes across as both a moral and stylistic victory for its talented and tenacious creators." Christopher Smith, awarding the album three stars for Jesus Freak Hideout, writes, "Love Prevails doesn't do much to stand out." Giving the album three and a half stars from 365 Days of Inspiring Media, Jonathan Andre says, "Love Prevails is just the album for us to fall in love with Justin’s powerful voice as much as his brother Josh’s when he was around leading the band. " Laura Chambers, rating the album a 3.8 out of five review for Christian Music Review, states, "A solid, consistent message throughout, catchy hooks, and honesty make this album a decent buy".

== Track listing ==
Track list
No.	Title	Length
1.	"Sound of Love"	2:58
2.	"Messenger"	4:06
3.	"Hope Is Alive"	4:04
4.	"It Was Love"	3:44
5.	"Warrior"	4:07
6.	"While We're Living"	3:34
7.	"Better"	3:50
8.	"Forever"	3:31
9.	"You Were There"	4:19
10.	"Heaven"	3:39
Total length:		37:57
