= Austins Bridge =

- Origin: Austin, Texas, United States
- Genres: Christian country
- Years active: 2007–2013
- Labels: Daywind Records
- Members: Justin Rivers; Jason Baird; Toby Hitchcock
- Past members: Mike Kofahl
- Website: www.austinsbridge.com

Austins Bridge is an American Christian country band originally formed in Austin, Texas. The band consists of Justin Rivers and Jason Baird.

== Band history ==
The band was formed around 2007 by Rivers and Baird, along with Mike Kofahl. After signing a record contract with Daywind Records, their eponymous debut album was released in 2007, produced by Bubba Smith. The album received critical praise and the band received several Dove Award nominations during the 39th GMA Dove Awards, winning "Best Bluegrass Recorded Song".

In 2008, the band participated at the Franklin Graham Crusade, and they've appeared at Winterfest for the past three years. After the departure of Kofahl, Toby Hitchcock, who had been friends with Lead singer Justin Rivers for many years, was asked to come and join the group. The band continued to tour. They recorded a live album called Live at Oak Tree, which was released on CD/DVD in 2009. The album received four Dove Award nominations at the 41st GMA Dove Awards, including "Country Album of the Year" and "Long Form Video of the Year".

In November 2009, the band performed at the opening of Mercy Ministries' new locations in Sacramento, California. In February 2010 they also joined other artists in recording "Come Together Now", a single in support of victims from the 2010 Haiti earthquake.

Their second studio album, Times Like These, was released in May 2010 and was produced by Jay DeMarcus of Rascal Flatts. The album received rave reviews and was nominated for a Grammy in 2011.

The group was not able to sustain itself financially throughout 2010 and though it hurt Justin, Jason & Toby very deeply, the boys decided to take a break from touring. The group remains on hiatus as of February 2012, and has no plans to get back together.

In April 2013, Justin Rivers competed in the blind auditions for a spot on NBC's The Voice: season four, and was selected to be a member of the team mentored by country singer Blake Shelton.

== Discography ==
- Austins Bridge (2007)
- Live at Oak Tree (2009)
- Times Like These (2010)

== Awards and nominations ==
Austins Bridge has received several Dove Award nominations in their career. In 2008, they were nominated for Bluegrass Recorded Song of the Year at the 39th GMA Dove Awards. In 2010, they received Dove Award nominations for Country Album of the Year and Long Form Music Video for Live at Oak Tree. The songs "Dry Bones" and "Hold on To Jesus" also received nominations for Country Recorded Song of the Year and Inspirational Recorded Song of the Year respectively.

Year	Association	Nominated work	Category	Result
2008	GMA Dove Awards	—	New Artist of the Year	Nominated
2008	GMA Dove Awards	"He's In Control"	Bluegrass Recorded Song of the Year	Won
2010	GMA Dove Awards	Live at Oak Tree	Country Album of the Year	Nominated
2010	GMA Dove Awards	Live at Oak Tree	Long Form Video of the Year	Nominated
2010	GMA Dove Awards	"Hold on to Jesus"	Inspirational Recorded Song of the Year	Nominated
2010	GMA Dove Awards	"Dry Bones"	Country Recorded Song of the Year	Nominated
2011	GMA Dove Awards	Times Like These	Country Album of the Year	Nominated
2011	Grammy Awards	Times Like These	Best Southern, Country, Or Bluegrass Gospel Album	Nominated
