= Favorite Songs of All =

Compilation album by Phillips, Craig and Dean
- Released: October 8, 1998
- Recorded: 1992–1998
- Genre: Contemporary Christian, Inspirational
- Label: Star Song
- Producer: Paul Mills; Brown Bannister

Phillips, Craig and Dean chronology
| Where Strength Begins (1997) | Favorite Songs of All (1998) | Restoration (1999) |

Favorite Songs of All is Phillips, Craig and Dean's sixth album and first greatest hits collection. No songs from Where Strength Begins or Repeat the Sounding Joy were included. In addition, two new songs, "Freedom of the Sea" and "No Matter How Long" were added to the album. "Shine On Us" originally appeared on the compilation album My Utmost for His Highest and appears for the first time on a PC&D album.

== Track listing ==
| No. | Title | Writer(s) | Original release(s) | Length |
|---|---|---|---|---|
| 1. | "Freedom of the Sea" | Dan Dean, Lowell Alexander | New song (1998) | 4:57 |
| 2. | "No Matter How Long" | Dean | New song (1998) | 4:53 |
| 3. | "Favorite Song of All" | Dean | Phillips, Craig, & Dean (1992) | 4:29 |
| 4. | "Turn Up the Radio" | Geoff Thurman | Phillips, Craig, & Dean (Note: Omits the radio intro.) | 3:52 |
| 5. | "I Want to Be Just Like You" | Dean, Joy Becker | Lifeline (1994) | 5:33 |
| 6. | "Shine On Us" | Michael W. Smith, Debbie Smith | My Utmost For His Highest (Various artists album) (1995) | 4:03 |
| 7. | "Mercy Came Running" | Dean, Dave Clark, Don Koch | Trust (1995) | 4:27 |
| 8. | "The Concert of the Age" | Jeoffrey Benward, Thurman | Lifeline | 4:20 |
| 9. | "Midnight Oil" | Shawn Craig, Becker | Phillips, Craig, & Dean | 4:42 |
| 10. | "Build a Bridge of Love" | Randy Phillips, Jeff Switzer | Lifeline | 4:42 |
| 11. | "This Is the Life" | Craig, Leonard Ahlstrom | Phillips, Craig, & Dean | 3:26 |
| 12. | "Little Bit of Morning" | R. Phillips, Dwight Liles | Phillips, Craig, & Dean | 4:24 |
| 13. | "He'll Do Whatever It Takes" | Dean | Lifeline | 4:56 |
| 14. | "Crucified with Christ" | R. Phillips, Denise Phillips, Clark, Koch | Trust | 5:18 |

== Personnel ==
=== Musicians ===
Phillips, Craig and Dean

- Randy Phillips – vocals
- Shawn Craig – vocals
- Dan Dean – vocals

Musicians (Tracks 1 & 2)

- Blair Masters – keyboards, acoustic piano
- Lincoln Brewster – guitars
- Jimmie Lee Sloas – bass
- Chris McHugh – drums
- Sam Levine – tin whistle (1)
- John Catchings – cello
- Richard Grosjean – viola
- David Angell – violin
- David Davidson – violin, string contractor
- Paul Mills – arrangements, string conductor
- Lisa Cochran – backing vocals
- Tim Davis – backing vocals, vocal arrangements
- Rikk Kittlemann – backing vocals

=== Production ===
- John Mays – executive producer (1, 2)
- Paul Mills – producer (1–5, 7–14), vocal recording (1, 2), mixing (1, 2), vocal production (6)
- Brown Bannister – producer (6)
- Shane D. Wilson – recording (1, 2)
- Jeff Pitzer – string recording (1, 2), musical assistance (1, 2), production manager (1, 2)
- Jason Boertje – musical assistance (1, 2)
- Ronnie Thomas – editing
- Hank Williams – mastering
- Christiév Carothers – creative direction
- Jan Cook – art direction
- Ian Black – design
- Matthew Barnes – photography
- Kristin Gossett Barlowe – stylist

Studios

- Tracks 1 & 2 recorded at Sixteenth Avenue Sound and Quad Studios (Nashville, Tennessee); RTC Studio (Franklin, Tennessee); Sunset Blvd. Studios (Brentwood, Tennessee).
- Tracks 1 & 2 mixed at Shakin' Studio (Franklin, Tennessee).
- Edited and Mastered at MasterMix (Nashville, Tennessee).
