= LifeAustin Church =

Church building in Texas, United States

Coordinates: 30.249857°N 97.903485°W

Life Family established on the west side of Austin, TX. The church was started in 2005 (21 years ago) by pastor Randy Phillips, who is also a member of the musical group Phillips, Craig and Dean. The church has approximately 3,500 congregants.
