= B. Reith =

- Born: Brian James Reith; January 26, 1979 (age 47)
- Origin: Brown Deer, Wisconsin
- Genres: Christian hip hop, pop, soul, rap, contemporary Christian
- Occupations: Singer-songwriter, rapper, guitarist, pianist
- Instruments: Vocals, guitar, keyboard
- Years active: 2002–present
- Labels: Gotee, Nside Entertainment
- Website: www.breith.com

Brian James Reith, better known as B. Reith, is a Christian hip hop/pop singer and rapper.

He began his musical career with the release of his first album, Urgent Message, in 2003. In 2008, Reith signed to Gotee Records and released his EP The Forecast. Later that year, he toured with TobyMac on the Winter Wonder Slam tour. In September 2009, Reith released his second album, Now Is Not Forever, which charted at No. 2 on the R&B/Hip-Hop Albums chart and No. 32 on the Heatseekers chart. The album spawned the singles "Antidote", which peaked at No. 50 on the Christian Songs chart, and "The Comeback Kid".

In early 2011, Reith released a buzz single "Knockin On My Door". On November 11, 2011, Reith released his third album, How the Story Ends. On September 2, 2016, Reith released a crowdfunded EP called Heart on My Sleeve, through Pledge Music.

== Early life ==
Brian James Reith grew up in Milwaukee, Wisconsin, where his father, Jim, owned and operated a recording studio. At a young age, he was exposed to music and soon took an interest in it; Reith sang on his first commercial at the age of five.

== Musical career ==
Reith's musical career began when he released an independent album, Urgent Message, in 2003. Christian singer and Gotee Records manager TobyMac discovered his music in 2006. TobyMac reportedly pulled his car off to the side of the road when he first heard Reith's music, later stating: "Brian is just naturally gifted from God vocally and his lyrics [...] sort of just ease into your heart." In 2008, Reith signed to Gotee Records and released his EP The Forecast in May 2008.

At the end of the year, he guested on TobyMac's annual 2008 Winter Wonder Slam tour, which ran through November and December 2008. On March 10, 2009, an expanded edition of his EP was digitally-released, featuring two more songs and two music videos. Reith's first full-length album, Now Is Not Forever, was released on September 22, 2009. In late 2009, Reith toured again with TobyMac on the Winter Wonder Slam tour.

In early 2011, Reith released a buzz single "Knockin On My Door". His third studio album, How the Story Ends, was released on November 1, 2011.

On September 2, 2016, Reith released his crowdfunded EP Heart on My Sleeve, through Pledge Music. The EP was released on regular digital markets on October 14, 2016. On October 21, 2017, Reith released the EP Heart on My Sleeve (Acoustic). He released an EP with reimagined versions of tracks from Now is Not Forever under his birth name in 2021.

== Style ==
Reith's style is based on a combination of hip hop and pop music. His lyrical style has been compared to Christian rapper KJ-52, specifically in Reith's song "Go On".

== Discography ==
=== Albums ===
Year	Album
2003	Urgent Message: 1st studio album; Released: 2003; Labels: n/a; Formats: CD, digital download
2009	Now Is Not Forever: 2nd studio album; Released: September 22, 2009; Labels: Gotee Records; Formats: CD, digital download
2011	How the Story Ends: 3rd studio album; Released: November 1, 2011; Labels: Nside Entertainment; Formats: CD, digital download

=== EPs ===
- 2004: One Down
- 2006: The Introproduction EP
- 2008: The Forecast EP
- 2009: The B. Reith EP
- 2016: Heart on My Sleeve EP
- 2017: Heart on My Sleeve (Acoustic) EP

=== Mixtapes ===
- 2012: How the Story Continues

=== Singles ===
Year	Title	Chart positions			Album
Year	Title	US	US Christian	US CHR	Album
2003	"Automatic"	—	—	—	Urgent Message
2003	"Hurt No More"	—	—	—	Urgent Message
2004	"Take Me Away"	—	—	—	One Down
2008	"Go On"	—	—	—	The Forecast EP
2008	"Awe-Struck"	—	—	—	The Forecast EP
2009	"Rain Down"	—	—	—	The Forecast EP
2009	"Mess"	—	—	19	The Forecast EP
2009	"Antidote"	—	50	—	Now Is Not Forever
2010	"The Comeback Kid"	—	—	—	Now Is Not Forever
2011	"Knockin' On My Door"	—	—	—	Knockin' On My Door – Single
2011	"Simple Days"	—	—	—	How the Story Ends
2012	"2 Steps Forward"	—	—	—	How the Story Ends

== Tours ==
- 2008: Winter Wonder Slam Tour (with TobyMac)
- 2009: Creation Festival: The Tour
- 2009: Winter Wonder Slam Tour (with TobyMac)
- 2009: The Comeback Kid Tour
- 2012: Synergy (with Mali Music)
- 2015: Northern Lights Tour (with Christon Gray & Swoope)

== Awards and nominations ==
Year	Category	Nominated work	Result
Dove Awards
2010	Rap/Hip Hop Recorded Song of the Year	"Go On"	Nominated
2010	Rap/Hip Hop Album of the Year	"Now Is Not Forever"	Nominated
