= Abandon (band) =

American Christian rock band

- Origin: San Antonio, Texas, US
- Genres: Christian rock; pop; alternative rock
- Years active: 2005–present
- Label: ForeFront
- Members: Justin Engler; Stevan Vela; Ben Vela
- Past members: Dave Vela; Ryan Reavis; Bryan Fowler; Josh Engler
- Website: abandonrock.com

Abandon is an American Christian rock band from San Antonio, Texas. The group had five members: brothers Josh (lead vocals) and Justin Engler (guitar), cousins Stevan (guitar) and Dave Vela (drums), and Bryan Fowler (bass).

Abandon signed with ForeFront Records in late 2007, and released the Abandon EP in July 2008. Their first single, "Providence", was released to radio in August. It reached No. 7 on R&R's Christian rock charts.

The group's name was inspired by the Bible verse: "And he that taketh not his cross, and followeth after me, is not worthy of me" (Matthew 10:38).

== History ==
The group of two brothers and two cousins, with friend Ryan Reavis (former bassist), formed as an independent band in 2002. They began playing worship music at their church. In 2005, they began to play local concerts and released their first album, Ambush. It was produced by the band with Tavis Wilson. Soon after the release of their second album, Who You Are (produced by Kevin Bruchert), Reavis chose to leave the band. Not long afterwards, Bruchert introduced the band to Bryan Fowler after they played at his church. Soon after, Fowler joined the band.

They signed a deal with ForeFront Records in the fall of 2007. The record label's A & R Recording manager, Chris York, discovered the band by hearing them play at a club next door (where York was in a restaurant with his wife). He claims:

"I was having dinner at a Mexican restaurant with my wife, and she started to get frustrated with me because she could tell I wasn't paying full attention to our conversation. This was because I could hear a band playing live at the club next door, and it sounded really, really good. I got in touch with the band later, and after we got to know each other, we knew it was a fit and started working together!"

Abandon's initial ForeFront release, the Abandon EP (produced by Chris Stevens), was released on July 22, 2008. It contains five tracks that were released on their forthcoming studio album. Alternative rock songs "Providence" and "All Because of You", which have more of a contemporary Christian music style, were both released as radio singles on August 1, 2008. "Providence" reached No. 7 on R&R's Christian rock chart by October 24, 2008.

Abandon released its second album, Control, on April 19, 2011. The band's single, "Live it Out", was featured on the Food Network for the promotion of Food Network Challenge. It was also played during the 2011 ESPY Awards on ESPN, and used in the Seven Network's highlights for the 2012 Australian Open.

Lead vocalist Josh Engler, decided to stop touring with the band in 2012. His brother, Justin, decided to move from guitar to vocals to fill the role. Dave (drums) and Bryan (bass) also decided to stop touring with Abandon that year. This left only Justin and Stevan. They decided to keep working on new music. They recruited Ben Vela, Stevan's brother, to play drums.

In April 2013, Abandon successfully funded their new album via a Kickstarter campaign. In early June 2014, it was announced that Kevin Max would be stepping down as lead singer of Audio Adrenaline. Abandon's former lead vocalist Josh Engler filled the position.

Later in 2014, the band released three new singles which included: "It Was Love", "Forever" (on a compilation album of various artists), Reverence: an Offering, and "While We're Living" (on Jesusfreakhideout.com). Abandon's third album, Love Prevails, was released on November 4, 2014. It was made available for purchase in the iTunes Store.

== Musical style ==
Abandon's music, and lead singer's voice, have often been compared to The Killers.

== Members ==
=== Current members ===
- Justin Engler – lead vocals, rhythm guitar
- Stevan Vela – lead guitar, background vocals
- Ben Vela – drums

=== Former members ===
- Ryan Reavis – bass guitar
- Chris Santos – bass guitar (session and live)
- Bryan Fowler – bass guitar
- Dave Vela – drums
- Josh Engler – lead vocals, keyboards

== Discography ==
Studio albums

- Who You Are (2006) (independent)
- Searchlights (2009) (ForeFront Records)
- Control (2011) (ForeFront)
- Love Prevails (2014) (2TEN Records)

Extended plays

- Ambush (2005) (independent)
- Abandon EP (2008) (ForeFront)
- Abandon II EP (2009) (ForeFront)

Singles

- "It Was Love" (2014) (independent)
- "While We're Living" (2014) (independent)
- "Forever" (2014) (independent)
