= Jesus Saves Live =

Live album by Travis Cottrell
- Released: January 5, 2010
- Genre: CCM
- Length: 73:58
- Label: Word Records

Travis Cottrell chronology
Ring the Bells (2008)	Jesus Saves Live (2010)

Professional ratings
Review scores
Source	Rating
Allmusic	3/5 stars

Jesus Saves Live is a live album from Christian singer Travis Cottrell. It was released on January 5, 2010, through Word Records.

== Track listing ==
1. "To the King" - 4:47
2. "Hallelujah, God Is Here" - 4:29
3. "Our God Saves" - 4:56
4. "I Will Sing of My Redeemer (With You Set Me Free)" - 5:03
5. "My Inheritance" - 4:55
6. "Praise the King" - 4:44
7. "Do It Lord" - 4:51
8. "Jesus Is the Lord" - 6:15
9. "Mercy Seat (With Lord, Have Mercy)" - 8:11
10. "Beth Moore" - 5:30
11. "I Am Persuaded" - 4:10
12. "Victory in Jesus" - 5:12
13. "Jesus Saves" - 4:19
14. "In Christ Alone (With the Solid Rock)" - 6:36

== Awards ==
The album was nominated for three Dove Awards for Inspirational Album of the Year, Praise & Worship Album of the Year, and Choral Collection of the Year at the 41st GMA Dove Awards. The song "Jesus Saves" was also nominated for Inspirational Recorded Song of the Year.
