= Mr. Del =

American rapper

- Also known as: Mr. Del, Dr.Del Lawrence, The Hope Dealer
- Born: Del Lawrence; Memphis, Tennessee
- Genres: Christian hip hop, Southern hip hop, crunk, dirty rap (early), hardcore hip hop (early), gangsta rap (early)
- Occupations: Rapper, record producer, President of Dedicated Music Group (DMG)
- Label: Dedicated Music Group(DMG)/Universal Music Group
- Website: mrdel.net

Mr. Del (born Delmar H. Lawrence III; June 10, 1978) is an American Christian rapper and music producer. He is president of the independent record label Dedicated Music Group (DMG)/Universal Records. He received a Grammy award nomination for Best Rock Gospel Album of the year and 2010 GMA Dove Award nomination for Rap/Hip Hop Album of the year. His first solo album, The Future (EMI Gospel), was released in 2005 and debuted at No. 15 on Billboard’s Gospel Chart. Hope Dealer was released in 2007 and peaked at No. 47 on Billboard’s Gospel Chart and featured American jazz musician Kirk Whalum. Thrilla (DMG/Universal Records) was released in 2009 and debuted at No. 2 on the Christian R&B/Hip Hop Chart.

== Early life and career ==
Mr. Del was born Delmar Lawrence in Memphis, Tennessee. He began his music career recording a song with the rap group Three 6 Mafia. After becoming a Christian in 2000, he left the secular rap genre to begin his own ministry and record label.

== Discography ==
- 1999: Lyrical Millenium
- 2000: The 2nd Coming
- 2000: Enter The Light
- 2003: Church Age
- 2003: Da Takeover
- 2004: Holy South Worldwide
- 2005: The Future
- 2006: Holy South: Kingdom Crunk
- 2007: Crunk Soul: A Nu Soul Project
- 2007: Hope Dealer
- 2009: Thrilla
- 2010: Tennmann
- 2013: Faith Walka
- 2014: Hope Dealer 2
- 2016: Love Noize
- 2018: Black
- 2020: MD:20/20 Southside
- 2020: MD:20/20 Soulside
