= Thrilla (album) =

Studio album by Mr. Del
- Released: June 30, 2009
- Genre: Southern hip hop, Christian hip hop, crunk

Mr. Del chronology
Hope Dealer (2007)	Thrilla (2009)	Tennman (2010)

Professional ratings
Review scores
Source	Rating
Jesus Freak Hideout	2.5/5 stars
Allmusic	(?)

Thrilla is an album from Christian hip-hop artist Mr. Del. It was released on June 30, 2009.

== Track listing ==
1. "Want It" - 4:42
2. "More Than a Conqueror" - 4:16
3. "Crunk Az Me" - 4:12
4. "Panic Room (True& Mot!)" - 4:13
5. "Rock It Out" - 4:01
6. "Spread the Gospel" - 3:19
7. "Checkin My S.W.A.G" - 4:39
8. "Get Dom" - 4:26
9. "Out There" - 5:28
10. "Blessed Fresh" - 4:13
11. "This Is It" - 2:44
12. "Step Forward" - 2:46
13. "U Can Do It 2" - 3:18
14. "Faith Walk" - 3:57
15. "Rite Back" - 4:17
16. "Reverse the Curse" - 3:22
17. "Don't Do It" - 4:50
18. "Run Away (True & Mot!)" - 3:51
19. "My Life Rated 'R' (Real)" - 2:42
20. "Indescribable" - 3:41

== Awards ==
The album was nominated for a Dove Award for Rap/Hip-Hop Album of the Year at the 41st GMA Dove Awards.

== Chart performance ==
The album peaked at #33 on Billboard's Gospel Albums.
