= Phillips, Craig and Dean =

Christian music trio

Phillips, Craig & Dean
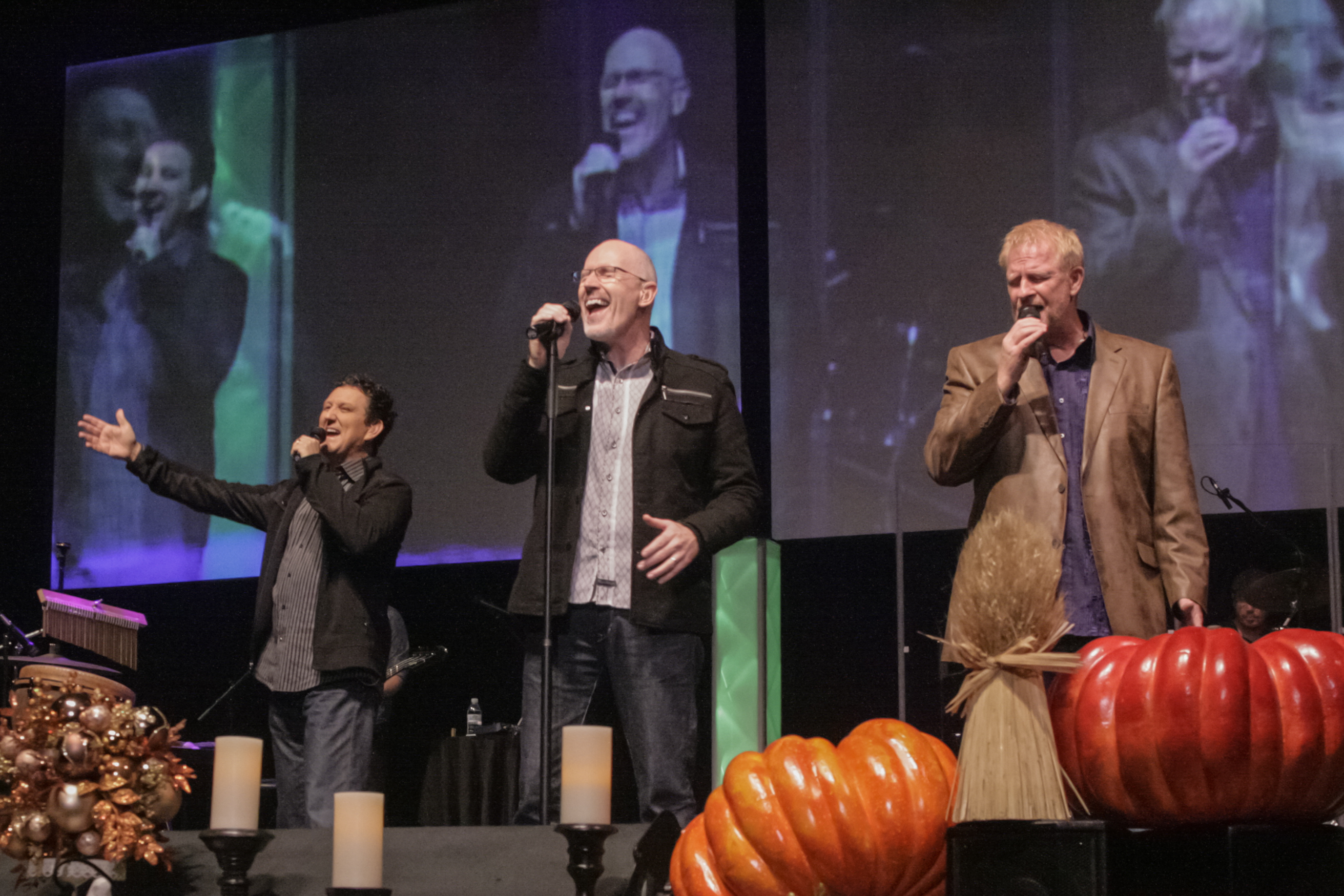
- Phillips, Craig and Dean performing in 2012

Background information
- Origin: Nashville, Tennessee
- Genres: Contemporary Christian, contemporary worship
- Occupations: Singers, songwriters, pastors
- Years active: 1991–present
- Label: INO/Columbia
- Members: Randy Phillips; Shawn Craig; Dan Dean
- Website: www.phillipscraiganddean.com

Phillips, Craig and Dean (rendered as Phillips, Craig & Dean on albums) is a contemporary Christian music trio composed of pastors Randy Phillips, Shawn Craig, and Dan Dean. Since forming in 1991, the group has sold over two million units. They have also received ten GMA Dove Award nominations, winning four, including Praise and Worship Album of the Year in 2007 for Top of My Lungs, and Inspirational Album of the Year in 2010 for Fearless.

== History ==
In 1991, Randy Phillips went to several record companies with a solo album he had. StarSong, a Nashville-based company, urged him to form a male vocal group. He then called two friends who also happened to be pastors—and had also recently made solo albums.

In 1992 they released their eponymously titled debut album, which peaked at No. 13 on the Christian albums chart. The band followed it with Lifeline in 1994 and Trust in 1995, which charted at No. 12 and No. 11, respectively. The song "Crucified with Christ" from Trust was particularly popular, reaching No. 1 on the INSPO chart and being nominated for 'Inspirational Song of the Year' and ' Song of the Year' at the 1997 Dove Awards. It was also awarded the 'Inspirational Song of the Decade Award' by CCM Magazine.

In 1996 they released a Christmas album titled Repeat the Sounding Joy featuring the Christ Church Choir and the Nashville String Machine.

In 1997 they released Where Strength Begins. The following year, they released a compilation titled Favorite Songs of All which included two new songs. In 1999 they returned with Restoration, and followed it with Let My Words Be Few in 2001 and Let Your Glory Fall in 2003.

In recent years, they've shed their contemporary Christian roots and focused on more worship oriented music. On that line, they've released their latest albums. It was through Phillips' weekly TV program that Phillips, Craig & Dean discovered what would be the title track for their 2004 CD Let The Worshipers Arise. The praise & worship-themed show sought to discover the best song from an unknown songwriter with Michael Ferrin of Texarkana, Texas taking home the top prize. Once the judging was over, the top five winners came to Austin and the winning song debuted on an Awakening broadcast. "When I heard him sing it live it was one of those moments," Phillips recalls. "I think when people hear it, it’s going to cause them to reach out to Christ with a renewed passion like they’ve never had before."

In 2006, Phillips, Craig and Dean released their 11th studio album, Top of My Lungs. Three singles from the album, Your Name, Saved the Day, and Top of My Lungs, landed Top 5 spots on the INSPO chart. The band gained national attention when Texas Rangers outfielder Josh Hamilton approached the plate at home games during the 2008 season to "Saved the Day", a song from the album.

They've also contributed to several Contemporary Christian music compilations, most notably My Utmost For His Highest in 1995. Their second greatest hits album, the 2-CD set The Ultimate Collection, was released by Sparrow Records in 2006.

Since all three singers are full-time pastors and make it a priority to be at their respective churches for Sunday services, they have declared a virtual moratorium on Saturday night concerts.

They have performed at the conventions of the National Religious Broadcasters and Christian Booksellers Association, appeared at Moody Church, played at Promise Keepers rallies, and recorded music for the National Day of Prayer. In 2001, the National Day of Prayer 50th Anniversary theme song was "Shine on Us", featuring the trio.

PC & D with Kari Jobe at the 2010 GMA Dove Awards show

Their album Fearless was released on August 4, 2009. It sold over 10,000 copies during its first week and reached No. 46 on the Billboard 200, becoming the trio's highest-debuting album to date. The album's first single was "Revelation Song". It reached No. 1 on Billboard's Hot Christian Songs chart in August 2009, and stayed at the top for 11 weeks. It also grabbed the top spot on the INSPO chart for 18 weeks. In addition, "Revelation Song" earned a Dove Award at the 2010 GMA Dove Awards for Worship Song of the Year, while Fearless earned the Inspirational Album of the Year award. During the 2010 GMA Dove Awards, Phillips, Craig and Dean performed Revelation Song live with fellow CCM artist Kari Jobe.

In 2010, the second single from Fearless, "Great Are You Lord" reached No. 1 on the INSPO chart. It has also peaked at No. 23 on the Hot Christian Songs chart and 19 on the Christian AC chart.

The group's first EP, a Christmas project titled Hope for All the World, was released later in 2010.

In 2012, the trio released their twelfth studio album, Breathe In. It peaked at No. 6 on Billboard's U.S. Christian Albums chart.

In 2013, the songs from their Christmas EP were added in a full-length studio album of the same name along with four new songs.

On November 10, 2014, their fourteenth studio album, Above It All, was released. It takes on a new, modern, and electronic style while retaining PCD's trademark elements. The first single is a reverent cover of "Jesus, Only Jesus".

In 2017 the trio released their fifteenth studio album Hymns & Psalms, a collection of hymns.

Their sixteenth studio album, You're Still God, was released on July 10, 2020.

== Members ==
Randy Phillips, Shawn Craig, and Dan Dean each is the senior pastor of a local church.

=== Randy Phillips ===
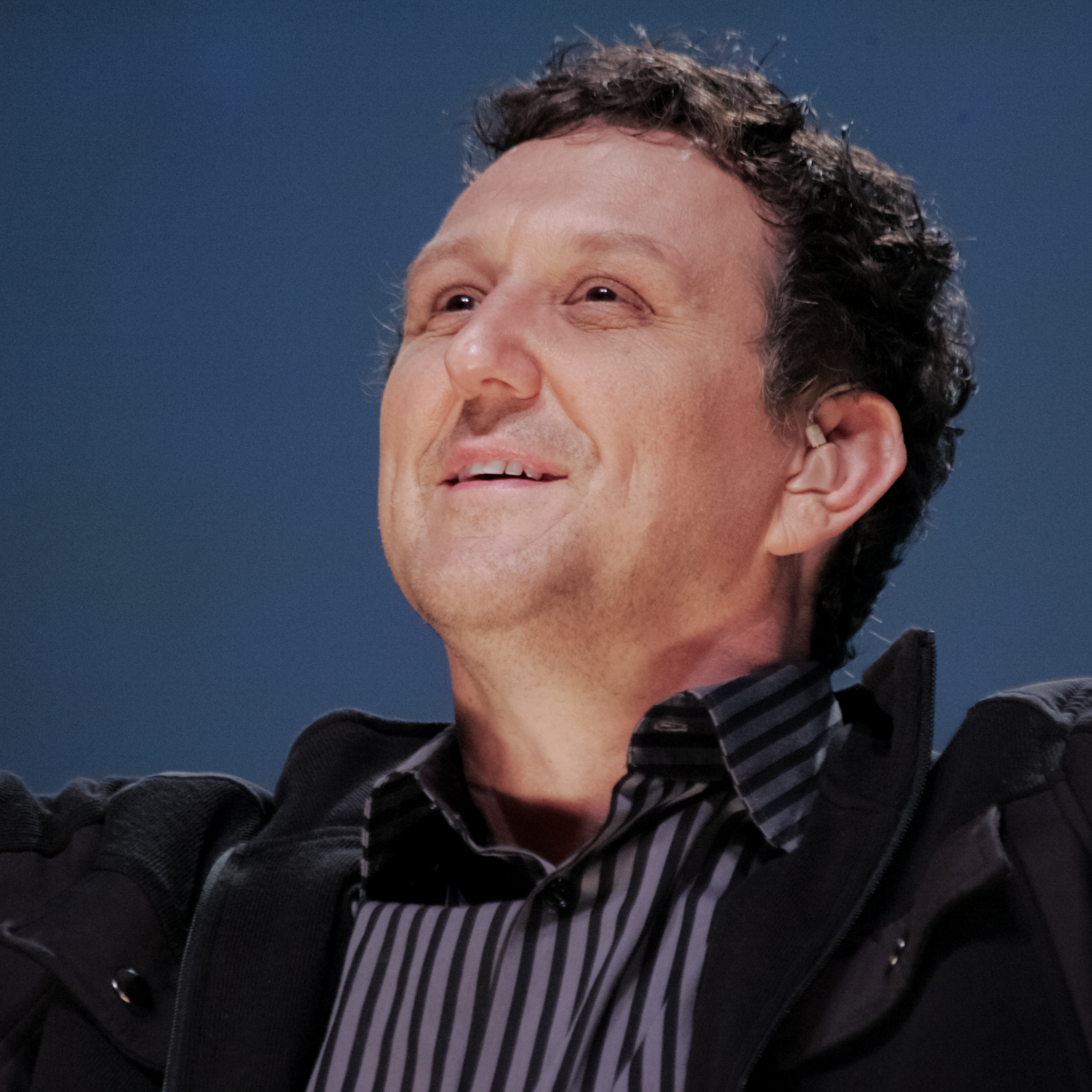
Randy Phillips (2012)

- Pastor of LifeAustin Church in Austin, Texas
- Hosts The Awakening, a long-running worship series—taped in Austin and has aired nationally on TBN and other channels

=== Shawn Craig ===
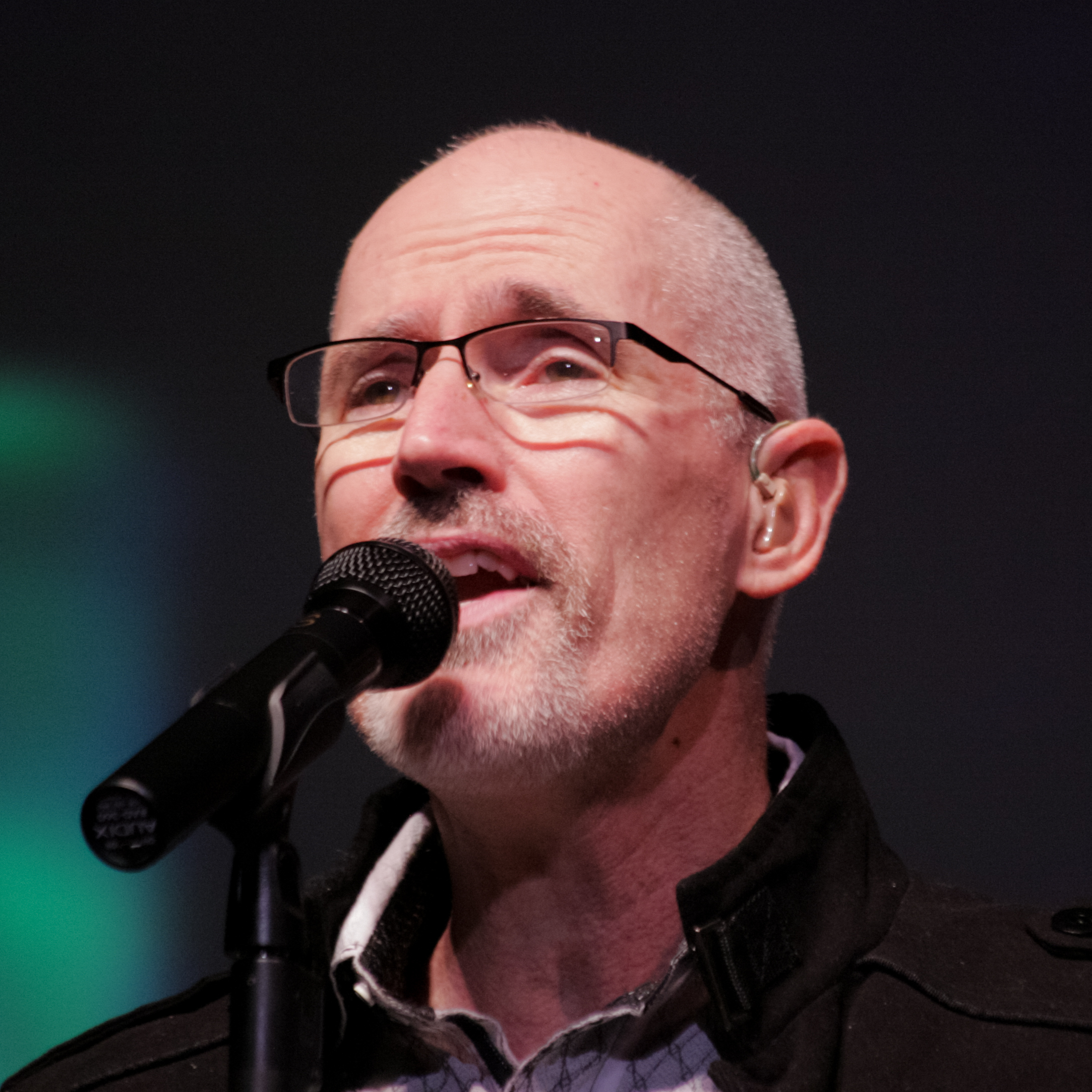
Shawn Craig (2012)

- Pastor of Crosspoint Church (formerly South County Christian Center) in St. Louis, Missouri
- Completed his Masters of Divinity degree at Oral Roberts University in Tulsa, Oklahoma
- Has won three GMA Dove Awards for the song In Christ Alone (in 1993—Inspirational Recorded Song of the Year; in 1994—Song of the Year; in 2006—Inspirational Recorded Song of the Year again)
- He is also married to Becki Trueblood(-Craig) of the Heritage Singers.

=== Dan Dean ===
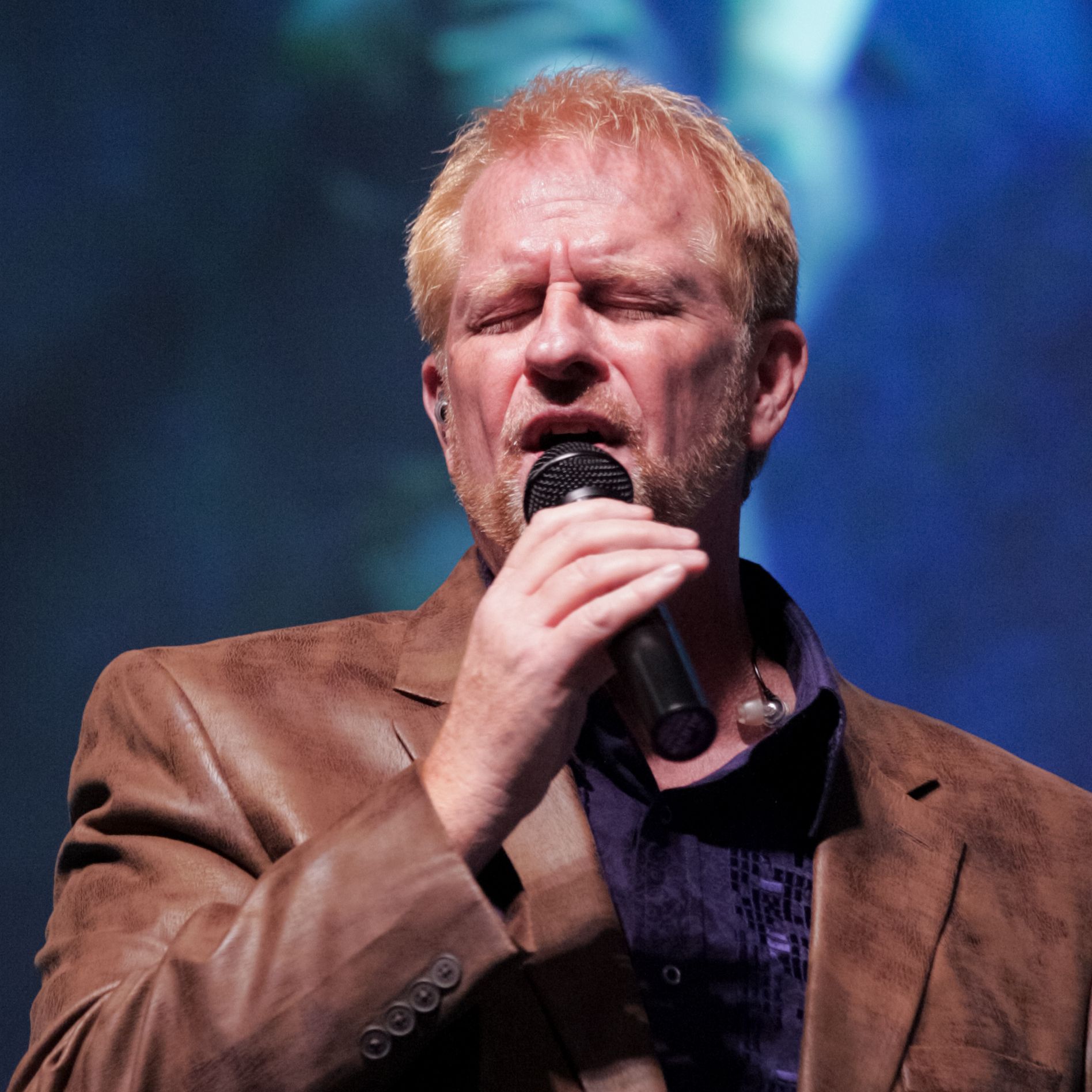
Dan Dean (2012)

- Pastor of Heartland Church (formerly Christ Temple) in Carrollton, Texas
- Began (like Craig) as music/worship director before becoming senior pastor
- In the Spring of 2012, Dean was diagnosed with prostate cancer, and is now in the process of recovery and remission

== Discography ==
=== Studio albums ===
Year	Title	Peak chart position			Label	Record producer
Year	Title	US Christian	Heatseekers	Billboard 200	Label	Record producer
1992	Phillips, Craig & Dean	13	–	–	Star Song	Paul Mills
1994	Lifeline	12	–	–	Star Song	Paul Mills / Brian Green
1995	Trust	11	40	–	Star Song	Paul Mills
1996	Repeat the Sounding Joy (Christmas album)	12	11	–	Star Song	Paul Mills / Carl Marsh
1997	Where Strength Begins	6	16	–	Star Song	Mills / Dennis Matkosky / Phil Naish
1999	Restoration	33	–	–	Sparrow	Phil Naish
2001	Let My Words Be Few	15	–	–	Sparrow	Nathan Nockels
2003	Let Your Glory Fall	8	2	142	Sparrow	Nathan Nockels
2004	Let The Worshipers Arise	5	7	179	INO/Columbia	Nathan Nockels
2006	Top of My Lungs	12	4	181	INO/Columbia	Nathan Nockels
2009	Fearless	1	–	46	INO/Columbia	Bernie Herms
2012	Breathe In	6	–	88	Fair Trade	Nathan Nockels / Bernie Herms
2013	Hope for All the World (Christmas album)	–	–	–	Fair Trade	Nathan Nockels
2014	Above It All	13	–	198	Fair Trade	Seth Mosley, Nathan Nockels
2017	Hymns & Psalms	–	–	–	Fair Trade	Chris Bevins
2020	You're Still God	–	–	–	Gaither Music Group	Nathan Nockels

==== EPs ====
- 2010: Hope for All the World EP (Independent)

==== Compilations ====
- 1998: Favorite Songs of All (Star Song) (includes 2 new songs)
- 2004: 8 Great Hits (Sparrow)
- 2005: The Worship Collection: Favorite Songs of All (Sparrow)
- 2006: The Ultimate Collection (2CD) (Sparrow)
- 2007: Greatest Hits (Sparrow)
- 2007: Favorite Live Songs of All
- 2011: My Phillips, Craig & Dean Playlist (Sparrow)

=== Singles ===
Year	Title	Peak chart positions		Certifications	Album
Year	Title	US Christ	US Heat	Certifications	Album
2003	"My Praise"	9	–		Let Your Glory Fall
2003	"Hallelujah (Your Love is Amazing)"	20	–		Let Your Glory Fall
2003	"Here I Am to Worship"	5	–		Let Your Glory Fall
2004	"You Are God Alone" ^{3}	10	–		Let the Worshipers Arise
2005	"Friend of God" ^{2}	9	–		Let the Worshipers Arise
2007	"Your Name" ^{3}	15	–		Top of My Lungs
2007	"Saved the Day" ^{3}	29	–		Top of My Lungs
2008	"Top of My Lungs" ^{3}	25	–		Top of My Lungs
2009	"Revelation Song" ^{2}	1	28	RIAA: Gold	Fearless
2010	"Great Are You Lord" ^{2}	19	–		Fearless
2010	"For All the World"	17	–		Hope for All the World (EP)
2010	"Do You Hear What I Hear?"	31	–		Hope for All the World (EP)
2011	"From the Inside Out" ^{3}	39	–		Fearless
2012	"When the Stars Burn Down (Blessing and Honor)"^{2}	3	–		Breathe In
2012	"Great I Am"	14	—		Breathe In
2014	"Jesus Only Jesus"^{2}	33	—		Above It All
"–" denotes releases that did not chart

- ^{2} Reached No. 1 on the Soft AC/Inspirational chart
- ^{3} Reached the Top 5 on the Soft AC/Inspirational chart

=== Video ===
- 2005: Live (INO/Epic)

== Awards and nominations ==
GMA Dove Awards

Year	Category	Nominated work	Result
1993	New Artist of the Year	—	Nominated
1994	Contemporary Song	"Favorite Song of All"	Nominated
1995	Inspirational Song of the Year	"I Want To Be Just Like You"	Nominated
1995	Inspirational Album of the Year	Lifeline	Nominated
1995	Special Event Album of the Year	My Utmost For His Highest	Won
1997	Inspirational Song of the Year	"Crucified With Christ" (Shawn Craig, songwriter)	Nominated
1997	Song of the Year	"Crucified With Christ" (Shawn Craig, songwriter)	Nominated
2002	Praise and Worship Album	Let My Words Be Few	Nominated
2005	Praise and Worship Album	Let the Worshipers Arise	Nominated
2007	Praise and Worship Album	Top of My Lungs	Nominated
2010	Worship Song	"Revelation Song"	Won
2010	Inspirational Album of the Year	Fearless	Won
2015	Inspirational Album of the Year	Above It All	Won

=== Other awards ===
- 1992: New Artist of the Year (Christian Research Report)
- 1993: No. 2 Favorite Group (CCM Magazine)
- 1993: No. 1 Song of the Year for "Favorite Song of All" (CCM Magazine)
- 2000: Inspirational Song of the Decade (1990s) for "Crucified With Christ" (CCM Magazine)
- 2005: Favorite Inspirational Artist Reader's Choice (CCM Magazine)
- 2006: Favorite Inspirational Artist Reader's Choice (CCM Magazine)
