= Jerry Sutton =

American Southern baptist minister

Dr. Jerry Sutton is an American Southern Baptist pastor, historian, and administrator. His theology is best described as conservative and evangelical.

== Biography ==
=== Early life ===
He earned a PhD in church history from the Southwestern Baptist Theological Seminary.

=== Career ===
He served at Two Rivers Baptist Church in Nashville, Tennessee, for twenty-two years and retired on August 3, 2008. The church averaged approximately 2,000 in average weekly attendance over the course of his pastorate.

In 1999, he led the Summit for the New Millennium which was designed to coordinate missionary efforts and church support in the 10/40 window, a region defined as having high socioeconomic challenges and low access to the Christian message and resources. He served as the president of Southern Baptist Pastor's Conference in 2000 and was first Vice President of the Southern Baptist Convention in 2005. During the 2006 Tennessee Baptist Convention, he led a movement amongst Tennessee Baptist to affirm the Baptist Faith and Message 2000 edition when he proposed that all appointees of the Convention’s Committee on Committees and the Convention’s Committee on Boards be asked if they affirmed the Baptist Faith and Message 2000 edition.

He served as the first vice president of the Southern Baptist Convention from June 2005 to June 2006. In June 2006, he announced he would allow himself to be nominated for the Presidency of the Southern Baptist Convention after being repeatedly asked to run by other Southern Baptists. He made this announcement only a few days prior to the election at the Southern Baptist Convention in Greensboro, North Carolina. He ran against two other candidates, Frank Page of South Carolina and Ronnie Floyd of Arkansas. He placed third with 24.08% of the overall vote.

In 2009 Sutton joined the faculty at Liberty University in Lynchburg, Virginia, and wrote the Primer on Biblical Preaching. He took the position of Vice President of Academic Development and Dean of the Faculty at Midwestern Baptist Theological Seminary in Kansas City, Missouri, in 2010.

=== Personal life ===
He is married to Fern, a professional Christian therapist, and has two daughters.

== Bibliography ==
- The Baptist Reformation
- The Way Back Home
- A Matter of Conviction
- A Primer on Biblical Preaching
- Lectures From the Gates of Hell
