= Jennie Lee Riddle =

American Christian songwriter (born 1967)

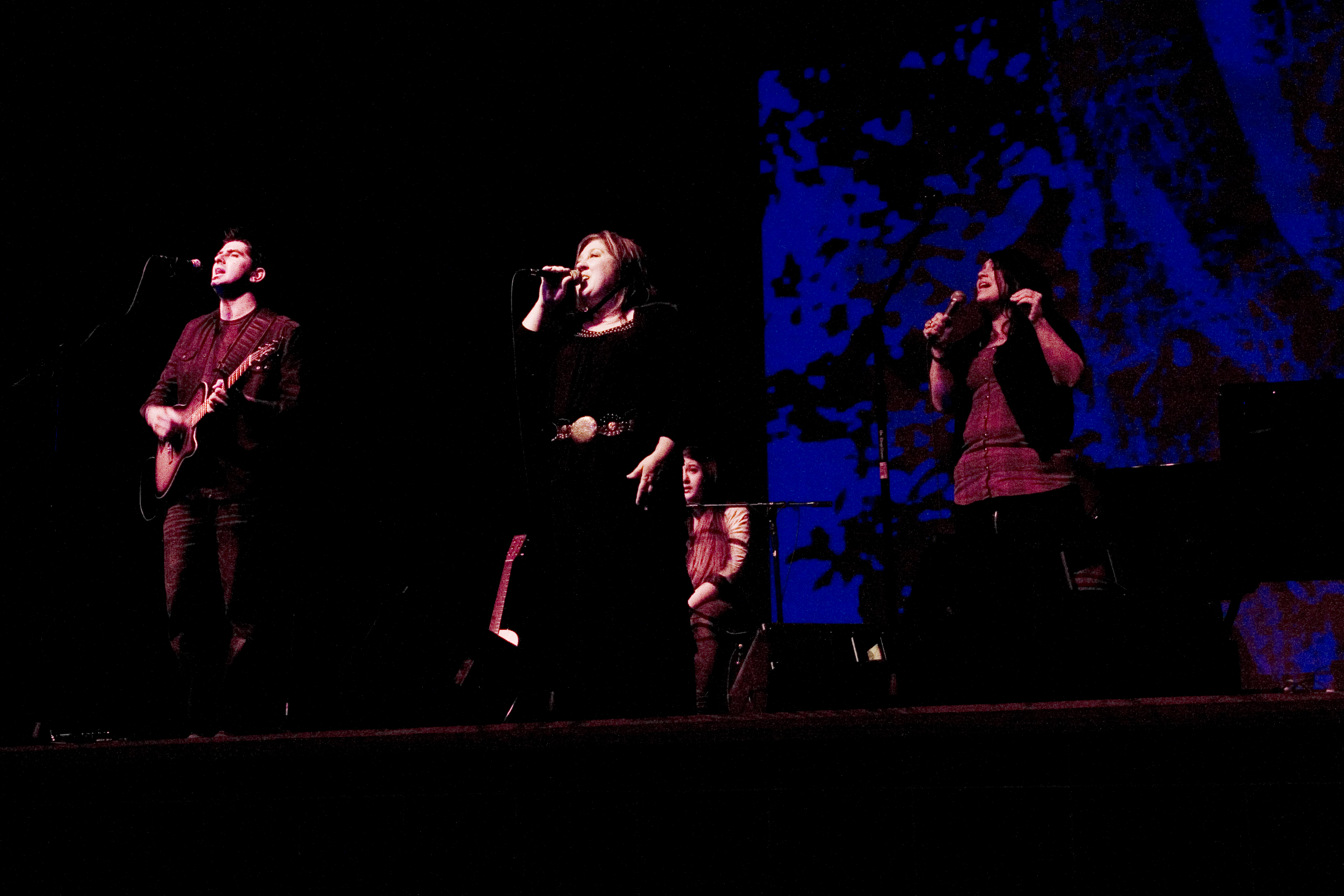
- Jennie Lee Riddle performs with New Nation Music at Prince of Peace Lutheran, Carrollton, TX.

Background information
- Born: Jennie Lee Gager; April 22, 1967 (age 59); Jefferson, Texas
- Genres: Worship; Contemporary Christian
- Occupation: Songwriter
- Years active: 2001–present
- Website: jennieriddle.com

Jennie Lee Riddle (born April 22, 1967) is an American Christian songwriter, best known for penning "Revelation Song", first made popular by Gateway Worship and Kari Jobe, and carried to No. 1 by Phillips, Craig & Dean. The song enjoyed a 17-week run at No. 1 on Christian radio per Billboard. "Revelation Song" has been recorded in multiple languages and has appeared on numerous albums. Most recently, the song was certified gold by the Recording Industry Association of America, an honor attributed to songs with over 500,000 units sold.

Riddle also co-wrote "When the Stars Burn Down," "Hope of the Broken World" and "The One That Really Matters" recently recorded on the Michael W. Smith album entitled Sovereign. She has been nominated for five Dove Awards, and awarded three; Songwriter of the Year, Worship Song of the Year (for "Revelation Song") and Inspirational Song of the Year (for "Hope of the Broken World" by Selah. Her songs are some of the most performed on CCLI (a company specializing in copyright licensing of Christian music), ranking in the top 10 since 2010.

Jennie's music has been recorded and performed by many other artists as well, including NewSong, Shane & Shane, JJ Heller, Jesus Culture, Gateway Worship, Chris Tomlin, Diante do Trono, Passion, Meredith Andrews, Travis Ryan, Newsboys, Sandi Patti, Guy Penrod, and Rebecca St. James. Her songs have been used among the largest Christian Conferences in the world including Passion.

2011 saw the release of the title-track song "One True God", featured on NewSong's latest album. The song was also performed by them during a Winter Jam Tour in 2012, billed as the world's largest Christian music tour.

The newest musical endeavor of Jennie's is the forming of People & Songs community, the 1st release of her Opus Collective, and the subsequent 1st release in the Simple Collection Series, "I Stand Before Almighty God Alone". Opus 1 enjoyed a No. 1 debut on iTunes and has since received all five-star reviews, in addition to being touted by Worship Leader Magazine as the Indie Best of Best for 2012 and listed in the top 10 albums of 2012 by New Release Tuesday.

Formerly, Jennie worked as a staff writer for Integrity Music and as a recruiter for the National Praise and Worship Institute. She volunteered her remaining time to the Gospel Music Association where she served as co-coordinator for Immerse for several years. She has been married to Darrin Riddle since 1988, and they have four adult children.

In addition to songwriting, Riddle is also a speaker, teacher, and church music consultant. She regularly teaches at conferences and events. A native Texan, Riddle currently resides in Laporte, Indiana with her husband.

== Song credits ==
Some of the songs written by Riddle are:

- "Revelation Song" – Kari Jobe, Gateway Worship, and Phillips, Craig & Dean
- "One True God" (co-written with Don Poythress and Tony Wood) – NewSong
- "Hope of the Broken World" (co-written with Carl Cartee) – Selah
- "You Are My Shepherd" (co-written with Jonathan Lee) – Tricia Brock (Superchick)
- "When The Stars Burn Down (Blessings & Honor)" (co-written with Jonathan Lee) – Rebecca St. James and Phillips, Craig & Dean
- "Dwelling Place" – Kari Jobe and Gateway Worship
- "King of This World" (co-written with Crystal Yates) – Rebecca Pfortmiller and Gateway Worship
- "It Is Finished" – (co-written (Matt Papa)
- "This Is My Father's World -(co-written with Aaron Purdy) (CCLI)
- "The One That Really Matters – (co-written with Dustin Smith)
- "I Stand Before Almighty God Alone" -(co-written with string-arranger Brandon Michael Collins)
- "You Can Take All That I Have" - (co-written with singer songwriter Sean Aaron Carter)

== Awards and nominations ==
| Year | Presenter | Nominated work | Award | Result |
|---|---|---|---|---|
| 2010 | GMA Dove Awards | Herself | Songwriter of the Year | Won |
| 2010 | GMA Dove Awards | "Revelation Song" | Song of the Year | Nominated |
| 2010 | GMA Dove Awards | "Revelation Song" | Worship Song of the Year | Won |
| 2011 | BMI Christian Music Awards | Herself | "Revelation Song" | Won |
