= Gateway Worship =

American Christian music band

- Origin: Southlake, Texas, U.S.
- Genre: Contemporary worship music
- Years active: 2003–present
- Labels: EMI, Fair Trade Services, Capitol Music Group
- Website: www.gateway-music.com

Gateway Worship is an American Christian worship band from Dallas-Fort Worth, Texas. The team leads worship at Gateway Church, a 39,000 member congregation located in Southlake, Texas, which has grown quickly since the church's beginnings in 2000. Gateway Worship is made of a whole team of worshippers who serve Gateway. Thomas Miller served as the original senior worship pastor until becoming executive ministry pastor in 2018. He was succeeded by Mark Harris, formerly of 4Him. Harris leads a team of worship pastors including, David Moore, Matt Birkenfeld, Zach Neese, Aaron Crider, Jason Tam, Tim Sheppard, Jessica Sheppard, Levi Smith, Austin Benjamin.

Gateway Worship is currently signed with Gateway Create Publishing, Fair Trade Services, and Integrity Music.

The group's 2008 release Wake Up the World reached No. 2 on the Billboard Top Christian Albums chart.

== Discography ==
Gateway Worship's discography includes live albums and studio albums.

=== Live albums ===
Year	Album	Details	Peak chart positions		Notes
Year	Album	Details	US 200	US Christ.	Notes
2006	Living for You	Recorded: April 29, 2005; Label: Integrity Music, Gateway Create	—	—	Recorded live at Gateway Church's original Southlake campus in Southlake, Texas.
2008	Wake Up the World	Recorded: September 21, 2007; Released: April 8. 2008; Label: Integrity Music, Gateway Create	—	2	Recorded live at Gateway Church's original Southlake campus in Southlake, Texas.
2010	God Be Praised	Released: November 15, 2010; Label: Integrity Music, Gateway Create	63	3	Recorded live over two nights at Gateway Church's original Southlake campus in Southlake, Texas. This is the last album recorded at Gateway's original Southlake campus.
2011	Great Great God (EP)	Released: November 1, 2011; Label: Gateway Create, Fair Trade Services	55	3	Recorded live over a weekend at Gateway Church's Southlake campus in Southlake, Texas. This is the first album recorded at Gateway's new Southlake campus.
2012	Forever Yours	Recorded: May 4, 2012; Released: October 19, 2012; Label: Gateway Create, Fair Trade Services	46	2	Recorded live at Gateway Church's Southlake campus in Southlake, Texas.
2015	Walls	Recorded: May 15, 2015; Released: October 2, 2015; Label: Gateway Create, Fair Trade Services	33	1	Recorded live at Gateway Church's Southlake campus in Southlake, Texas.
2018	Acoustic Sessions: Volume One	Recorded: November 9, 2017; Released: January 19, 2018; Label: Gateway Music	—	—	
2018	Greater Than	Recorded: May 25, 2018; Released: September 28, 2018; Label: Gateway Music, Fair Trade Services	121	2	Recorded live at Gateway Church's Southlake campus in Southlake, Texas.
2020	See You Move: Acoustic Session Volume 2	Released: August 28, 2020; Label: Gateway Music, Integrity Music	—	—	
2023	Completely Abandoned (Live)	Released March 3, 2023; Label: Gateway Music, Integrity Music	—	—	Recorded live at Gateway Church's Grand Prairie campus in Dallas, Texas.
2023	Crowns Down (Live)	Released: September 8, 2023; Label: Gateway Music, Capitol Music Group	—	48	Recorded live at Gateway Church's Grand Prairie campus in Dallas, Texas.

=== Studio albums ===
- Unsearchable (2003)
- My Beloved (2009)
- (Songs Inspired By) Conversations with God (2009)
- The More I Seek You (2011)
- Gateway Worship Voices (2016)
- Monuments (2017)

=== Gateway Devotions albums ===
The album titles are taken from various sermon series led by Robert Morris, Founding Senior Pastor.

- Drawing Closer: Songs from Gateway Devotions (2006)
- The Battle: Songs from Gateway Devotions (2007)
- First: Songs from Gateway Devotions (2008)
- Let's Go: Songs from Gateway Devotions (2010)
- In Jesus Name: Songs from Gateway Devotions (2012)
- Love Expressed: Songs from Gateway Devotions (2013)
- It Is Written: Songs from Gateway Devotions (2014)
- The Blessed Life: Songs from Gateway Devotions (2015)
- The God I Never Knew: Songs from Gateway Devotions (2016)
- Waiting on a Whisper: Songs from Gateway Devotions (2017)

=== Compilation albums ===
- The First 10 Years (2013)
- Voices: Kari Jobe (2016)
- Voices: Thomas Miller (2016)

=== Gateway Choir albums ===
- We Cry Out (2016)

=== Gateway Kids Worship albums ===
- Look Up (as Gateway Next) (2012)
- Ready to Go (as Gateway Next) (2013)
- Heartbeat (EP) (2016)
- Believe It (2018)
- Todos Mis Dias (2020)

=== Gateway Generate albums ===
- Gateway Generate (EP) (2013)

=== Spanish albums ===
- El Señor Reina (2013)
- Gloria a Dios (2014)
- Por Siempre Tuyo (2016)
- Murallas (2017)
- Mas Grande (2018)
- Grande y Fiel (2022)
- Celebraré (2023)

=== Portuguese albums ===
- Glória a Deus (2012)
- Deus Reina (2015)
- Pra Sempre Teu (2016)
- Muralhas (2017)
