= Nathan Nockels =

American singer-songwriter

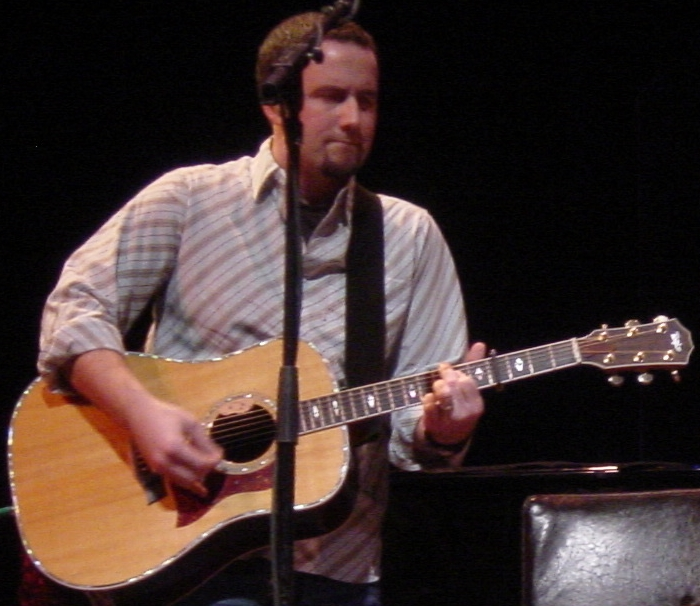
- Nathan Nockels on August 25, 2005

Background information
- Birth name: Nathaniel Edward Nockels
- Also known as: Nathan
- Born: June 8, 1973 (age 51); Oklahoma City, Oklahoma
- Origin: Franklin, Tennessee; Alpharetta, Georgia
- Occupation(s): music producer, composer, songwriter, guitarist pianist, bassist
- Instrument: Multi-instrumentalist
- Years active: 1997–present
- Spouse: Christy Nockels (m. 1995)

Nathaniel Edward "Nathan" Nockels (born June 8, 1973) is an American singer-songwriter and worship leader, who is a producer, songwriter, and composer of sacred music. He has received seven GMA Dove Awards, for his production. Nockels and his wife, Christy, were members of the worship-duo, Watermark.

== Early and personal life ==
Nockels was born, Nathaniel Edward Nockels, on June 8, 1973, in Oklahoma City. He is a graduate of Oklahoma Baptist University. Nockels first came in contact with Christy Nockels, while they were attending the Christian Artists Seminar in 1993, where it was hosted in Estes Park, Colorado, and they would eventually marry in 1995. The couple now reside in Franklin, Tennessee, and Alpharetta, Georgia, with their three children.

== Music career ==
His music career started in 1997, where he was a producer on Faith of Our Fathers, that was released on September 9, 1997. He was a member of the worship duo, Watermark, with his wife Christy Nockels, from 1998 until 2006, when he focused more on production work and her on a solo music career. Nockels has gone on to produce albums and songs that have won him seven GMA Dove Awards, during his career, mostly for Passion Conferences albums in the category of Special Event Album of the Year, in 2007, 2009 and 2011. He won GMA Dove Awards for Pop/Contemporary Album of the Year in 2012, where he was the producer on Blessings by Laura Story, and for Inspirational Album of the Year in 2015, for his production on Above It All by Phillips, Craig and Dean, with Seth Mosley. His work with Matt Redman has won him GMA Dove Awards for Blessed Be Your Name: The Songs of Matt Redman Vol. 1 in the category of Praise and Worship Album of the Year in 2006, while winning for Contemporary Christian Performance of the Year with song "10,000 Reasons (Bless the Lord)" on 10,000 Reasons.
