= List of Brazilian singers and bands of Christian music =

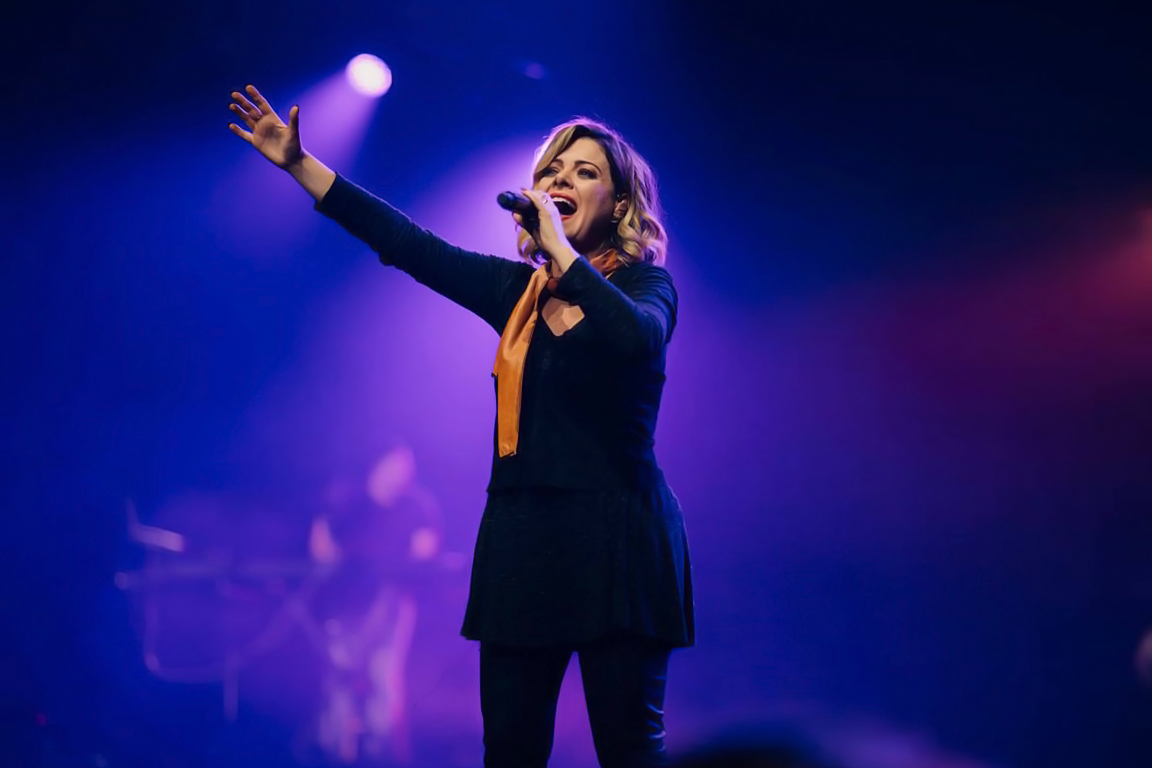
Ana Paula Valadão, one of the main worship music ministries in Brazil

This is a list of notable Christian singers, who were either citizens or residents of Brazil, or published the bulk of their work while living there.

== A ==
- Rodolfo Abrantes (born 1972)
- Lu Alone (born 1993)

== B ==
- Aline Barros (born 1976)
- Fernanda Brum (born 1976)

== C ==
- Cassiane (born 1973)

== D ==
- Damares (born 1980)
- Diante do Trono

== F ==
- Ludmila Ferber (born 1965)
- Marine Friesen (born 1988)

== M ==
- Cristina Mel (born 1964)
- Soraya Moraes (born 1973)

== N ==
- Mattos Nascimento (born 1954)
- Nelson Ned (1947–2014)
- Ana Nóbrega (born 1980)

== O ==
- Oficina G3

== P ==
- Perlla (born 1988)

== R ==
- Gabriela Rocha (born 1994)
- Deise Rosa (born 1974)

== S ==
- Davi Sacer (born 1975)
- Israel Salazar (born 1990)
- Sarah Sheeva (born 1973)
- Nívea Soares (born 1976)
- Juliano Son (born 1978)

== T ==
- Trazendo a Arca

== V ==
- Ana Paula Valadão (born 1976)
- André Valadão (born 1978)
- Mariana Valadão (born 1984)

== See also ==
- Brazilian music
- Contemporary Christian music
- Contemporary worship music
- List of singers
- List of televangelists in Brazil
- Category:Brazilian gospel singers
