= Hillsong Global Project =

Album series / musical project by Hillsong

The Hillsong Global Project is an initiative by Hillsong Music working with various Hillsong Church campuses around the world, along with international worship ministries to create nine albums in nine different languages.

These languages include Spanish, Portuguese, Korean, Mandarin, Indonesian, German, French, Swedish and Russian—featuring Hillsong songs.

The albums were released on 18 September 2012. All albums contain "Go" except for Global Project Español, which features "You Deserve" instead, and each album has a different track listing.

== List of albums ==
=== Global Project Deutsch ===
Global Project Deutsch is the German-language version recorded with Hillsong Church Konstanz and Düsseldorf.

Global Project Deutsch

Studio album
- Released: 18 September 2012
- Recorded: 2012
- Genre: Contemporary worship music
- Length: 64:38
- Label: Hillsong Music
- Producers: Reuben Morgan, Freimut Haverkamp, Joanna Haverkamp

No.	Title	Length
1.	"Wir geben es alles hin" ("Go")	04:15
2.	"Gott ist's möglich" ("God is Able")	04:41
3.	"Zurück zu dir" ("The Lost Are Found")	08:03
4.	"Ich lauf in deinen Arm" ("Forever Reign")	06:12
5.	"Mein Gebet (Schritt für Schritt)" ("Like Incense (Sometimes By Step)")	07:37
6.	"Du bist mit uns" ("With Us")	04:42
7.	"Du" ("You")	04:29
8.	"Alles ist anders" ("The Difference")	03:47
9.	"Du lebst in mir" ("Alive in Us")	04:34
10.	"Weil Du mich endlos liebst" ("Unending Love")	06:18
11.	"Ich will Dich Loben" ("I Will Exalt You")	07:33
12.	"Meine Seele steht fest" ("The Stand")	07:01
Total length:		64:38

=== Global Project Español ===
Global Project Español

Studio album
- Released: 18 September 2012
- Recorded: 2012
- Genre: Contemporary worship music
- Length: 77:36
- Labels: Hillsong Music, CanZion
- Producers: Reuben Morgan, Marcos Witt, Alex Campos, Marco Barrientos, Marcela Gándara, Darlene Zschech, Toni Romero

No.	Title	Writer(s)	Worship leader	Length
1.	"Tú Mereces" ("You Deserve")	Matt Crocker, James Dunlop	Marco Barrientos	04:47
2.	"Dios Es Amor" ("Our God Is Love")	Joel Houston, Scott Ligertwood	Marcos Witt	04:06
3.	"Dios Es Poderoso" ("God Is Able")	Reuben Morgan, Ben Fielding	Alex Campos	04:23
4.	"Hosanna"	Brooke Fraser	Marcela Gándara	05:42
5.	"Es Tu Amor" ("It's Your Love")	Mia Fieldes	Darlene Zschech	05:31
6.	"Gracias" ("Thank You")	Morgan, Fielding	Alex Campos	05:25
7.	"Aquí Estoy" ("The Stand")	Houston	Marcos Witt	06:55
8.	"Tu Amor No Tiene Fin" ("With Us")	Morgan, Dylan Thomas	Marco Barrientos	04:41
9.	"Abre Mis Ojos" ("Open My Eyes")	Morgan, Braden Lang	Alex Campos	04:03
10.	"Por Mí Murió" ("To Know Your Name")	Matt Crocker	Marco Barrientos	05:40
11.	"Eterno Amor" ("Unending Love")	Jill McCloghry & Sam Knock	Marcos Witt & Marcela Gandara	06:10
12.	"Poderoso Para Salvar" ("Mighty To Save")	Morgan, Fielding	Marcos Witt	06:01
13.	"Sobrenatural" (from Sobrenatural)	Marcos Witt, Alex Campos, Pablo Sierra, Eduardo Durney	Marcos Witt	05:04
14.	"Cantamos Aleluya" (from Transformados)	Julián Collazos	Marcos Barrientos	04:33
15.	"Te Alabaré"	Campos	Alex Campos	04:49
Total length:				77:36

=== Global Project Français ===
Global Project Français

Studio album
- Released: 18 September 2012
- Recorded: 2012
- Genre: Contemporary worship music
- Length: 67:25
- Label: Hillsong Music
- Producers: Reuben Morgan, Brendan White, Camille White

Global Project Français is the French-language version recorded by Hillsong Church Paris.

No.	Title	Length
1.	"Pour suivre ta voie" ("Go")	04:14
2.	"Dieu est Puissant" ("God is Able")	04:36
3.	"Hosanna" ("Hosanna")	06:16
4.	"Je t'exalterai" ("I Will Exalt You")	07:26
5.	"Tu es là" ("With Us")	04:43
6.	"Ouvre mes yeux" ("Open My Eyes")	04:05
7.	"Toi" ("You")	04:31
8.	"C'est notre Dieu" ("This Is Our God")	06:06
9.	"De tout mon être" ("With Everything")	07:23
10.	"Amour sans fin" ("Unending Love")	06:34
11.	"Tu vis en nous" ("Alive in Us")	04:31
12.	"Sauve avec Puissance" ("Mighty to Save")	06:54
Total length:		68:09

=== Global Project Indonesia ===
Global Project Indonesia

Studio album by JPCC Worship, True Worshippers, Hillsong
- Released: 18 September 2012
- Recorded: 2012
- Genre: Contemporary worship music
- Length: 77:21
- Labels: Hillsong Music, Insight Unlimited
- Producers: Sidney Mohede and Kenny Goh

Global Project Indonesia is the Indonesian-language version recorded with JPCC Worship.

No.	Title	Writer(s)	Worship leader	Length
1.	"Kuberikan Segalanya" ("Go")	Matt Crocker	Sidney Mohede	04:18
2.	"Tuhan Sanggup" ("God is Able")	Reuben Morgan, Ben Fielding	Sidney Mohede	04:12
3.	"Hosana" ("Hosanna")	Brooke Fraser	Ribka Wijaya	05:47
4.	"Kau Ditinggikan" ("I Will Exalt You")	Fraser	Sari Simorangkir	04:38
5.	"Terbesar" ("Stronger")	Morgan, Fielding	Gianni Messah	04:25
6.	"Berkuasa Selamanya" ("Forever Reign")	Jason Ingram, Morgan	Sidney Mohede	05:20
7.	"Kau" ("You")	Joel Houston	Billy Simpson	04:28
8.	"Berdiri" ("The Stand")	Houston	Gianni Messah	06:44
9.	"Kaulah Tuhan" ("This Is Our God")	Morgan, Fielding	Alvi Radjagukguk	05:04
10.	"Bagaikan Dupa" ("Like Incense (Sometimes By Step)")	Fraser, David Strasser, Rich Mullins	Ribka Wijaya	06:40
11.	"Kasih AbadiMu" ("Unending Love")	Sam Knock, Jill McCloghry	Billy Simpson, Ribka Wijaya	05:09
12.	"Sanggup S'lamatkan" ("Mighty To Save")	Morgan, Fielding	Alvi Radjagukguk	03:52
13.	"Dengan-Mu Tuhan" (from Glory to Glory)	Andre Hermanto	Sidney Mohede, Sari Simorangkir	04:38
14.	"Tiada Ternilai" (from Glory to Glory)	Andre Hermanto	Sidney Mohede, Sari Simorangkir	06:14
15.	"Jadi Seperti-Mu" (from God Is Our Victory)	Andre Hermanto	Sidney Mohede, Sari Simorangkir	06:08
Total length:				77:21

=== Global Project Português ===
Global Project Português

Studio album by Diante do Trono and Hillsong
- Released: 18 September 2012
- Recorded: 2012
- Genre: Contemporary worship music
- Length: 78:34
- Labels: Hillsong Music, CanZion Brasil
- Producer: Diante do Trono

Global Project Português is the Brazilian Portuguese version recorded with Diante do Trono released on CanZion Brasil.

No.	Title	Writer(s)	Worship leader	Length
1.	"Tudo Por Ti" ("Go")	Matt Crocker	Israel Salazar	04:14
2.	"Nosso Deus é Poderoso" ("God Is Able")	Reuben Morgan, Ben Fielding	Guilherme Fares	04:16
3.	"Hosana" ("Hosanna")	Brooke Fraser	Ana Paula Valadão, Mariana Valadão and Felippe Valadão	06:05
4.	"Vivo Em Nós" ("Alive in Us")	Morgan, Jason Ingram	Ana Nóbrega	04:12
5.	"És Mais Forte" ("Stronger")	Morgan, Fielding	Amanda Cariús and Tião Batista	04:21
6.	"Pra Sempre Reinarás" ("Forever Reign")	Morgan, Ingram	André Valadão	03:28
7.	"Tu És" ("You")	Joel Houston	Dave Ware	04:26
8.	"Me Rendo" ("The Stand")	Houston	Ana Paula Valadão	06:11
9.	"Aleluia" ("Hallelujah")	Marty Sampson, Jonas Miryn	Ana Paula Valadão	05:46
10.	"Como Incenso / Passo-a-Passo" ("Like Incense / Step by Step")	Fraser, Rich Mullins	Ana Nóbrega	07:38
11.	"Este é o Nosso Deus" ("This Is Our God")	Morgan	Rodrigo Campos	05:30
12.	"Eterno Amor" ("Uneding Love")	Jill McCloghry, Sam Knock	Ana Paula Valadão and Israel Salazar	05:33
13.	"Poder Pra Salvar" ("Mighty to Save")	Morgan, Fielding	André Valadão	05:13
14.	"Meu Coração" (from Sol da Justiça)	Ana Paula Valadão	Ana Paula Valadão	05:20
15.	"A Ti a Honra" (from Sol da Justiça)	Ana Paula Valadão	Amanda Cariús, Marine Friesen and Letícia Brandão	06:35
Total length:				78:34

=== Global Project Svenska ===
Global Project Svenska is the Swedish-language version recorded by Hillsong Church Stockholm.

No.	Title	Length
1.	"Vi ger vårt allt" ("Go")
2.	"För vår Gud är allting möjligt" ("God Is Able")
3.	"Hosianna" ("Hosanna")
4.	"Jag ger dig ära" ("I Will Exalt You")
5.	"Du är vår Gud" ("This Is Our God")
6.	"Regerar i ditt ljus" ("Forever Reign")
7.	"Du" ("You")
8.	"Jag står" ("The Stand")
9.	"Halleluja" ("Hallelujah")
10.	"Kärlek som aldrig tar slut" ("Unending Love")
11.	"Kärlek stor" ("It's Your Love")
12.	"Alla behöver kärlek" ("Mighty to Save")

=== Global Project Русский ===
Global Project Русский

Studio album by Hillsong Church Kiev, Hillsong
- Released: 18 September 2012
- Recorded: 2012
- Genre: Contemporary worship music
- Length: 78:07
- Label: Hillsong
- Producers: Zhenya Kasevich, Vera Kasevich, Roman Kasevich

Global Project Русский is the Russian-language version recorded by Hillsong Church Kiev.

No.	Title	Writer(s)	Worship leader	Length
1.	"Мы всё отдаём" ("Go")	Matt Crocker	Roman Kasevich	04:17
2.	"Всё может Бог наш" ('God Is Able")	Reuben Morgan, Ben Fielding	Roman Kasevich	04:17
3.	"Осанна" ("Hosanna")	Brooke Ligertwood	Vera Kasevich	05:52
4.	"Превознесу я" ("I Will Exalt You")	Ligertwood	Vera Kasevich	04:38
5.	"Ты блудных найдёшь" ("The Lost are Found")	Fielding, Sam Knock	Roman Kasevich	05:46
6.	"Цари вовек" ("Forever Reign")	Reuben Morgan, Jason Ingram	Roman Kasevich	05:13
7.	"Ты" ("You")	Joel Houston	Roman Kasevich	04:28
8.	"Стою" ("The Stand")	Houston	Roman Kasevich	06:34
9.	"Таков Бог наш" ("This Is Our God")	Morgan	Vera Kasevich	05:42
10.	"B вечной любви" ("Unending Love")	Knock, Jill McCloghry	Roman Kasevich, Vera Kasevich	06:13
11.	"Ты сильнее" ("Stronger")	Morgan, Fielding	Roman Kasevich	04:22
12.	"Силён спасти" ("Mighty to Save")	Morgan Fielding	Roman Kasevich	05:00
13.	"Алтарь" (from "Алтарь")	Vera Kasevich, Roman Kasevich	Vera Kasevich	04:25
14.	"Бог всей земли" (from "Это наш царь")	Roman Kasevich	Roman Kasevich	05:46
15.	"Это наш царь" (from "Это наш царь")	Kasevich, Kasevich	Roman Kasevich	06:52
Total length:				78:07

=== Global Project 華語 ===
Global Project 華語

Studio album by New Creation Church, Hillsong
- Released: 18 September 2012
- Recorded: 2012
- Genre: Contemporary worship music
- Length: 66:47
- Labels: Hillsong Music, New Creation Church
- Producers: Nelson Ng, James Liew, Victor Xue, Susan Wilson, Karen Lim

Global Project 華語 is the Mandarin-language version recorded with New Creation Church Singapore.

No.	Title	Writer(s)	Worship leader	Length
1.	"行祢旨意" ("Go")	Matt Crocker	Sean Goh	04:19
2.	"神有大能" ("God Is Able")	Reuben Morgan, Ben Fielding	Sean Goh	04:15
3.	"和散那" ("Hosanna")	Brooke Fraser	Esther Volstad	05:50
4.	"我要尊崇祢" ("I Will Exalt You")	Fraser	Angie Lesmana	04:38
5.	"永遠掌權" ("Forever Reign")	Morgan, Jason Ingram	Louis Teng	05:33
6.	"更堅固" ("Stronger")	Morgan, Fielding	Teng	04:21
7.	"祢" ("You")	Joel Houston	Daniel Chong	04:31
8.	"浪子回頭" ("The Lost Are Found")	Fielding, Sam Knock	Goh	05:50
9.	"我們的神" ("This Is Our God")	Morgan	Chong	05:37
10.	"活在我們裡面" ("Alive in Us")	Morgan, Ingram	Adeline Gan	04:27
11.	"無盡的愛" ("Unending Love")	Knock, Jill McCloghry	Gan, Chong	06:09
12.	"大能拯救" ("Mighty To Save")	Morgan, Fielding	Goh	05:03
13.	"祢施恩" ("I See Grace")	Karen Lim	Gan	06:26
14.	"主愛拯救了我" ("Love Rescued Me")	Lim	Gan	06:32
15.	"愛何等奇妙" ("Love So Amazing")	Lim	Gan	04:40

=== Global Project 한국어 ===
Global Project 한국어 is the Korean-language version recorded by Campus Worship (예수전도단).

No.	Title	Length
1.	"주님 안에 자유있네" ("Go")
2.	"능력의 주" ("God Is Able")
3.	"호산나" ("Hosanna")
4.	"크신 사랑 온 땅 찬양해" ("Alive in Us")
5.	"강하신 주" ("Stronger")
6.	"영원히 다스리네" ("Forever Reign")
7.	"오직 주" ("You")
8.	"태초부터 계신 주" ("The Stand")
9.	"주 하나님" ("This is Our God")
10.	"향기로운 기도 들으소서" ("Like Incense/Sometimes By Step")
11.	"변함없는 사랑" ("Unending Love")
12.	"내 주는 구원의 주" ("Mighty to Save")
13.	"예수는 내 삶의 모든 것" ("Jesus You Are Everything To Me")
14.	"내 영혼에 빛" ("Light in My Soul")
15.	"우리 주 하나님" ("Our Lord, God")

== Awards and nominations ==
The Spanish version of this project was awarded "Spanish Album of the Year" at the Gospel Music Association's Dove Awards of 2013.
