= Mariana Valadão =

- Born: 3 July 1984 (age 42); Belo Horizonte, Minas Gerais, Brazil
- Genres: Contemporary Christian music, contemporary worship music, worship music
- Occupations: Singer, songwriter, worship pastor, television presenter
- Instrument: Vocals
- Years active: 2000–present
- Labels: Diante do Trono, Furious? Record, Graça Music, Sony Music
- Formerly of: Diante do Trono
- Website: marianavaladao.com

Mariana Machado Valadão (born 3 July 1984) is a Brazilian Christian singer, songwriter, worship pastor and television presenter.

== Biography ==
Mariana Valadão is the daughter of Pastor Márcio Valadão and Renata Valadão, pastors and founders of the Lagoinha Baptist Church. Mariana is the youngest sister of André Valadão and Ana Paula Valadão.

She was part of the worship ministry Diante do Trono, led by her sister Ana Paula Valadão.

Her first solo album was "Mariana Valadão", recorded in 2008.

== Discography ==
Solo career

Title	Details
Mariana Valadão	Released: 2008; Label: Graça Music; Format: CD, download digital; Sales: 150,000
De Todo Meu Coração	Released: 2009; Label: Graça Music; Format: CD, download digital; Sales: 200,000
Vai Brilhar	Released: 2011; Label: Graça Music; Format: CD, download digital; Sales: 100,000
Santo	Released: 21 October 2013; Label: Sony Music; Format: CD, download digital; Sales: 80,000
Canções para Ninar	Released: 7 August 2015; Label: Sony Music; Format: CD, download digital; Sales: 11,500

Video Albums

Title	Details
Vai Brilhar	Released: 2011; Label: Graça Music; Format: CD, download digital; Sales: 60,000

with Diante do Trono

- Águas Purificadoras – as member (2000)
- Aclame ao Senhor – as member (2000)
- Preciso de Ti – as member (2001)
- Brasil Diante do Trono – as member (2002)
- Nos Braços do Pai – as member (2002)
- Quero Me Apaixonar – as member (2003)
- Esperança – as member (2004)
- Ainda Existe Uma Cruz – as member (2005)
- Por Amor de Ti, Oh Brasil – as member (2006)
- In the Father's Arms – as member (2006)
- En los Brazos del Padre – as member (2006)
- Tempo de Festa – as member (2007)
- Príncipe da Paz – as member (2007)
- Com Intensidade – as member (2008)
- A Canção do Amor – as member (2008)
- Tua Visão – as special participant (2009)
- Sol da Justiça – as special participant (2011)
- Glória a Deus – as special participant (2012)
- Creio – as special participant (2012)
- Global Project: Português – as special participant (2012)
- Tu Reinas – as special participant (2014)
- Deus Reina – as special participant (2015)
