= Tetelestai =

Live album by Diante do Trono
- Released: 28 June 2015
- Recorded: 13–15 May 2014, Tower of David, Golgotha, Garden of the Empty Tomb and Mount of Olives, Jerusalem, Israel
- Genre: Contemporary worship music
- Label: Diante do Trono
- Producer: Diante do Trono

Diante do Trono Live praise & worship chronology
Tu Reinas (2014)	Tetelestai (2015)

Tetelestai is the seventeenth album in the live praise and worship series of Christian Contemporary music by Diante do Trono.

== Background ==
The title comes from the Greek word τετέλεσται (tetelestai) meaning "it is completed", which according to St. John, is the next to last word of Jesus on the cross, the last words of Christ on the Cross was, "Father into thy hands I commit my spirit".

In the pre-recording of Tetelestai, the mining group released the Tu Reinas album, recorded at the Events Park Padre Cícero, in Juazeiro do Norte.

The album contains 10 songs, all were written by Ana Paula Valadão, 8 new songs and two re-recordings from previous albums. The recording of the album took place in places like the Tower of David, Golgotha, the Garden of the Empty Tomb and the Mount of Olives. The event was thirteen days long. This is the first disc of the Diante do Trono recorded outside Brazil.

This recording captured the hearts of Israel. Several international TV news reported the recording that took place in the Tower of David, for example, CBN News, which did a story about the event and interviewed Ana Paula Valadão and her husband, Gustavo Bessa.

The event's audience had about 500 people, among these 382 people are formed by subscribers in a caravan.

== CD track listing ==
All songs written by Ana Paula Valadão. All songs led by Ana Paula Valadão except where noted.

Song	Worship leader
"Medley Israel (Abertura Shema Israel, Deus de Israel, Shailailai, Salmo 24)"	
"A Batalha é do Senhor"	Ana Paula Valadão and André Valadão
"Espontâneo"	Ana Paula Valadão and André Valadão
"Salmo 91 Recitado"	
"À Sombra do Altíssimo"	
"Seu Nome"	
"Espontâneo"	
"Eu Sou"	Israel Salazar
"Ó, Jerusalém"	Ana Paula Valadão, Ana Lúcia Câmara, Asaph Borba and Rosana Borba
"Tetelestai"	
"Espontâneo"	
"Ressuscitou"	
"Aleluia Maranata"	
"O Espírito e a Noiva"	
