= Diante do Trono (label) =

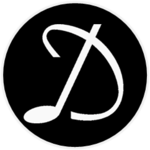
- Parent company: Diante do Trono
- Founded: 1997
- Distributor(s): Diante do Trono
- Genre: Contemporary worship music
- Country of origin: Brazil
- Official website: www.diantedotrono.com

Diante do Trono is a label created by Diante do Trono group. He started his work officially as a record label in 2003 and launched a solo career as gospel singers André Valadão, Nívea Soares and also CTMDT. In 2009, the label stopped distributing, but in 2014 the label again distributed.

== Artists ==
Current

- Diante do Trono
- Ana Paula Valadão
- Crianças Diante do Trono
- Israel Salazar
- Marine Friesen

Former

- André Valadão
- Nívea Soares
- Ministério Intimidade
- CTMDT
- Trazendo a Arca

== Albums distributed between 2014–present ==
- Tetelestai - Diante do Trono 17 (2015)
- Alfa & Ômega - Marine Friesen (2015)
- Jesus - Israel Salazar (2015)
- Tu Reinas - Diante do Trono 16 (2014)

== Albums distributed between 1998-2009 ==
- Amigos do Perdão - Crianças Diante do Trono (2010)
- As Fontes do Amor - Ana Paula Valadão (2009)
- Para Adorar ao Senhor - Crianças Diante do Trono (2008)
- Com Intensidade - 10 Years Diante do Trono (2008)
- A Canção do Amor - Diante do Trono 11 (2008)
- Sobrenatural - André Valadão (2008)
- Ao Vivo no Japão - Trazendo a Arca (2007)
- Príncipe da Paz - Diante do Trono 10 (2007)
- Marca da Promessa - Trazendo a Arca (2007)
- Samuel, o Menino que Ouviu Deus - Crianças Diante do Trono 6 (2007)
- En los Brazos del Padre - Spanish version of Nos Braços do Pai (2007)
- In the Father's Arms - English version of Nos Braços do Pai (2007)
- Tempo de Festa - 10 Years Diante do Trono (2007)
- Rio - Nívea Soares (2007)
- Clássicos - André Valadão (2007)
- Viver por Ti - CTMDT 1 (2006)
- Por Amor de Ti, Oh Brasil - Diante do Trono 9 (2006)
- A Arca de Noé - Crianças Diante do Trono 5 (2006)
- Alegria - André Valadão (2006)
- Fan the Fire - Nívea Soares (2006)
- Ainda Existe Uma Cruz - Diante do Trono 8 (2005)
- Vamos Compartilhar - Crianças Diante do Trono 4 (2005)
- Milagres - André Valadão (2005)
- Enche-me de Ti - Nívea Soares (2005)
- Esperança - Diante do Trono 7(2004)
- Mais que Abundante - André Valadão (2004)
- Quem é Jesus? - Crianças Diante do Trono 3 (2004)
- Reina Sobre Mim - Nívea Soares (2003)
- Quero Me Apaixonar - Diante do Trono 6 (2003)
- Amigo de Deus - Crianças Diante do Trono 2 (2003)
- Nos Braços do Pai - Diante do Trono 5 (2002)
- Brasil Diante do Trono 1 - Diante do Trono (2002)
- Crianças Diante do Trono - Crianças Diante do Trono 1 (2001)
- Preciso de Ti - Diante do Trono 4 (2001)
- Águas Purificadoras - Diante do Trono 3 (2000)
- Exaltado - Diante do Trono 2 (2000)
- Diante do Trono - Diante do Trono 1 (1998)
