= Diante do Trono =

Brazilian contemporary Christian music band

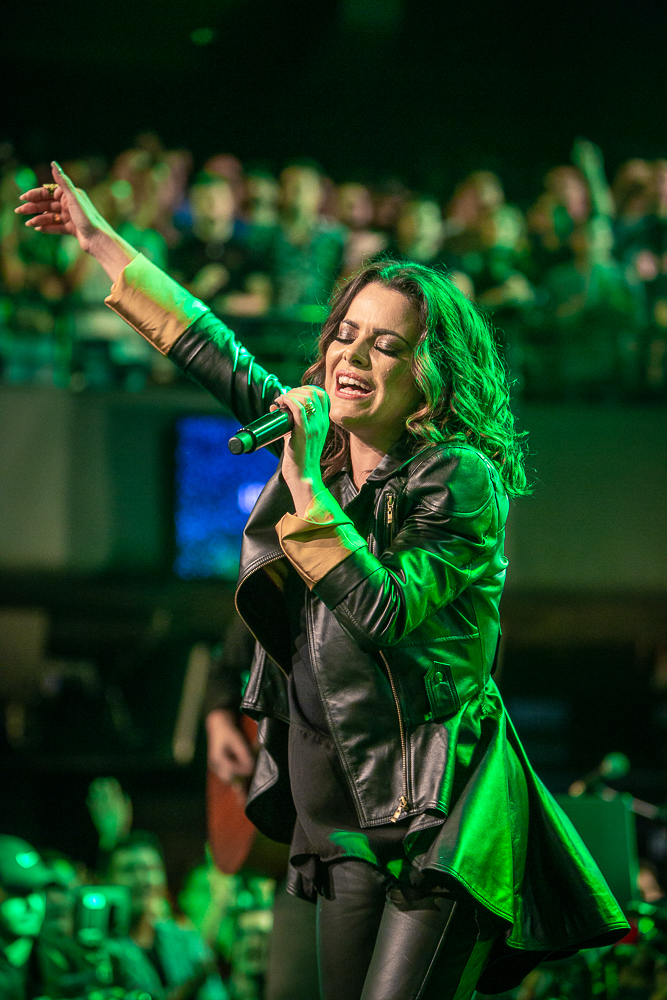
- Ana Paula Valadão and Diante do Trono in 2019

Background information
- Origin: Belo Horizonte, Minas Gerais, Brazil
- Genres: Contemporary Christian music; contemporary worship music; worship music; pop rock
- Years active: 1997–present
- Labels: Diante do Trono; Hosanna!/Integrity; Som Livre; Onimusic
- Members: Ana Paula Valadão
- Past members: Ana Nóbrega; Amanda Cariús; Daniel Friesen; Elias Fernandes; Israel Salazar; Jarley Brandão; Letícia Brandão; Marine Friesen; Thiago Albuquerque; Vinícius Bruno; André Valadão; Breno Borges; Bruno Gomes; Clay Peterson; Eduardo Leite; Érica Costa; Graziela Santos; Guilherme Fares; Gustavo Soares; Helena Tannure; João Lúcio Tannure; Marcelo Costa; Mariana Valadão; Maximiliano Moraes; Nívea Soares; Paulo Abucater; Tião Batista; Renata Valadão; Roberta Izabel; Roney Fares; Rodrigo Campos; Saara Campos; Sérgio Gomes; Soraya Gomes
- Website: www.diantedotrono.com

Diante do Trono (IPA: [dʒiˈɐ̃tʃi du ˈtɾonu]; lit.: Before the Throne) is a Brazilian contemporary Christian music band formed in 1997 as a ministry of Lagoinha Church in Belo Horizonte. It is led by singer, songwriter and pastor Ana Paula Valadão. The group became popular in Brazil since the release of their first album in 1998: Diante do Trono. However, it was from the Águas Purificadoras and Preciso de Ti albums that it acquired international recognition, becoming the largest worship ministry in Latin America and one of the world's largest ministries of praise, worship and mission. It is also considered one of the most successful bands in Brazilian music.

In a single presentation, held on 10 July 2003, during the recording of the album, Quero Me Apaixonar, Diante do Trono gathered about 2 million people at Campo de Marte Airport, in São Paulo, being the largest public of a Christian event already registered in the world, and the second largest public of Brazil, losing only to the festival Rock In Rio. The band has also been a winner of Talent and Promises Awards, and was nominated for the Latin Grammy in 2012 and 2026 with the albums Sol da Justiça and De Nós Se Lembrará. The group has sold over 15 million albums, one of the record holders for music sales in Brazil.

For its first decade and a half, the band had brass and string sections. It has had several instrumental changes throughout its career, especially the period of the years 2011 and 2012, when the only members that remained from the initial group were lead vocalist Ana Paula Valadão and rhythm guitarist Elias Fernandes. The band's sound became noticeably more pop rock with the removal of its brass and string sections, and is characterized by congregational singing, with influences of pop rock, progressive rock and folk.

Diante do Trono, in partnership with the Lagoinha Church, has promoted over the years several social, humanitarian and missionary actions, having part of its profits from the sales of CDs and DVDs destined for initiatives such as India Project, which combats human trafficking, collecting and helping Indian girls in prostitution, as well as other occasional actions promoted during some of its live album recordings in Brazil and the Middle East. The group also has part of its discography entirely aimed at children, the Crianças Diante do Trono. The group also created the Ministerial Training Center Diante do Trono (CTMDT), a preparatory center for musicians and singers in the area of missions, as well as the Arts Factory, which is a partnership with Lagoinha Church, to train professionals in various areas such as singing, theater and dance.

== History ==
=== 1997–2001: The beginning ===
In 1997, the group was formed in the church in 1997. The songs would be composed or versioned by Ana Paula Valadão herself, who would also take the lead in praise, while Sérgio Gomes would be responsible for the instrumental arrangement. The musicians responsible for this recording were Lagoinha praise ministers. To this end, rehearsals began later that year and the material for the album was recorded live on 31 January 1998, at a worship service at the Lagoinha Church in Belo Horizonte. Along with Ana Paula, the vocals were formed by other singers such as André Valadão, his brother, Nívea Soares and Soraya Gomes, wife of Sérgio Gomes. A few months after the recording, the musical work was released, having an initial print run only for members of the local church, but was later distributed throughout Brazil independently. The name of the album was called Diante do Trono. Many songs from that recording began to be performed on radio stations and churches in various parts of Brazil, especially "Aclame ao Senhor", "Deus de Amor", "Manancial" and "Te Agradeço".

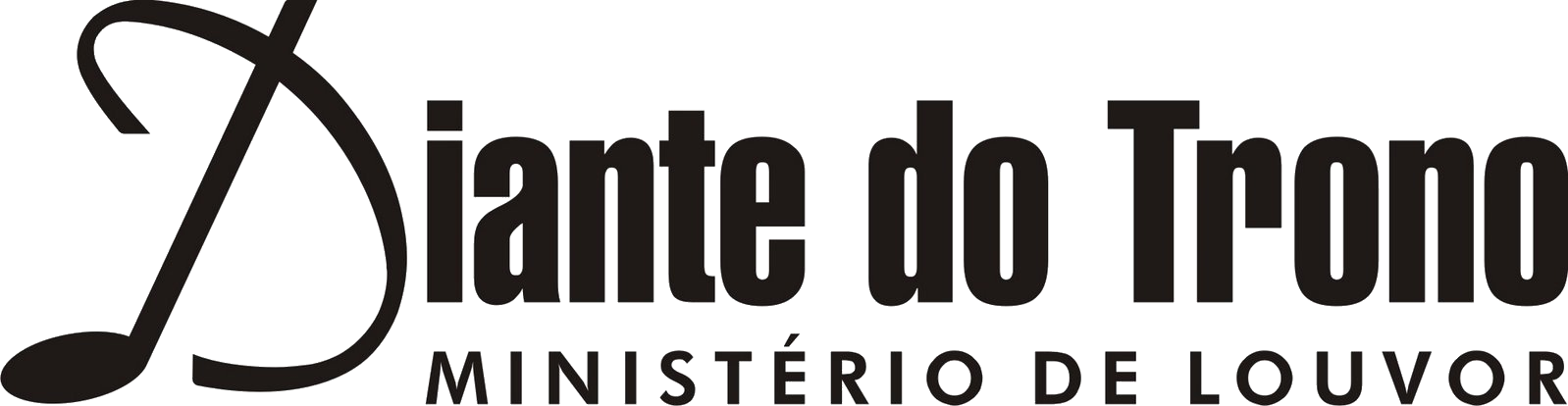
Logo adopted by the band.

With the positive repercussion and commercial success of the album, the ministry of praise decided to continue, taking the name of the first release: "Diante do Trono". In the following months, the members of the group began to consolidate, with the entrance of the couple Helena Tannure and João Lúcio Tannure, besides the vocal arranger Maximiliano Moraes. Thus, on 13 February 1999, again at Lagoinha Church, was recorded the second album of the series, entitled Exaltado, highlighting the songs "A Ele a Gloria", "Quero Ser" and "Amigo Fiel". From Exaltado, the Diante do Trono began to perform throughout Brazil and the band's popularity began to grow among evangelicals, the name of the group was consolidating with their trips to Brazilian states and their expressive sale of records.

In 2000, the First Conference of Praise and Worship Diante do Trono was held, also at the Lagoinha Church. This has undergone some name changes over the years, but continues to be held annually on Holy Week holiday in Belo Horizonte. For the recording of the group's third album, the Lagoinha temple no longer held the public interested in participating, so, on 15 July 2000, the album Águas Purificadoras was recorded at Parque da Gameleira, Belo Horizonte, gathering about of seventy thousand people and had the arrival of new band members, such as Graziela Santos and Mariana Valadão. This album had even more impact among the congregational praises of several Brazilian churches, with special success of the title song. That same year, the group had partnership with the American label Hosanna! Music, recorded two musical works: Aclame ao Senhor, Portuguese version of the album Shout to the Lord, by Hillsong Church, and Shalom Jerusalém, consisting of songs with Jewish rhythm featuring Paul Wilbur.

In 2000, the group founded a house for young girls in India to combat prostitution.

In 2001, the group released the fourth album of the Diante do Trono's series: Preciso de Ti, recorded on 14 July of that year at the Mineirão Stadium in Belo Horizonte, bringing together about two hundred and ten thousand people, this was the record of public in the history of the Minas Gerais stadium. The work sold four hundred thousand copies in the week of release and subsequently surpassed the two million mark sold, making it an unprecedented success in the history of Brazilian Christian music, with all of its songs being performed on likes radios and churches all over Brazil. In addition to their commercial success, the band gained media recognition and criticism, winning the Talent Awards in 2002 in the Best Music category for "Preciso de Ti" and Best Group.

Still in 2001, the first album of the collection Crianças Diante do Trono was released, with its works directed to children. The eponymous work would become the first in a series of children's albums, and the song "Aos Olhos do Pai" became one of the group's biggest hits, also among the adult audience.

=== 2001–2006: Vision "Brasil Diante do Trono" ===
In late 2001, Ana Paula Valadão said she received a vision from God that showed that the Diante do Trono should hold gatherings for Brazil, so that the nation in unity would pray and intercede for the country. To this end, the group, which had hitherto concentrated in Belo Horizonte for their live recordings, began to hold gatherings throughout all regions of Brazil, and as the beginning of this project, on 1 December 2001, in Maracanã Stadium, in Rio de Janeiro, with an audience of more than 180,000 people, was recorded the album Brasil Diante do Trono, which was a collection with recordings of songs released by the group in the first four albums.

On 13 July 2002, in continuation of the "Brasil Diante do Trono" project, it was recorded at the Ministries Esplanade in Brasília, Federal District, attended by over one million two hundred thousand people, from caravans from all over Brazil, the fifth album of the Diante do Trono's series, called Nos Braços do Pai. It was the first time that a musical event was held at that venue and to this day it was the largest stage ever built for the Diante do Trono's recordings, which brought together vocalists, band, orchestra, choir and dancers. The album contained songs with the theme of divine fatherhood and again was commercial and critical success. In 2006, the album also gained versions of the Diante do Trono itself in English and Spanish, but as of 2002, the group began making international trips showing their work in other countries, performing as in Guatemala and Japan.

In 2003, Nívea Soares decided to start a solo career and recorded her first album, Reina Sobre Mim, but without leaving the group. On 12 July 2003, the group recorded the sixth album of the Diante do Trono's series and the third of the "Brasil Diante do Trono" project: Quero Me Apaixonar, which featured a theme of love for God and repentance, as well as a remix version of the song "Manancial". The recording took place at Campo de Marte Airport, in the north of São Paulo, and had an audience of over two million people, a record for the group. In this event the band collected 35 tons of food, which were distributed in the north of Minas Gerais. At that year's Talent Awards, the band took two of their three nominations. Soon after recording the CD Quero Me Apaixonar in São Paulo, the Diante do Trono went through a period of change covering the entire internal and administrative structure of the group, which remained independent, with its own record label.

In 2004, André Valadão followed in the footsteps of Nívea Soares and began his solo career with the work Mais Que Abundante parallel to the group's work. That same year, the seventh work, Esperança, was recorded at the Bahia Administrative Center in Salvador, on 10 July 2004, bringing together about one million two hundred thousand people, according to data from the Bahia Military Police, and had the sound of the Bahian group Tambores Ungidos in the song "Quem é Deus Como o Nosso Deus?". In the recording Ana Paula shared with the audience her difficulty getting pregnant and brought a message of encouragement, faith and hope. At the Talent Awards, the band was the highlight, winning seven out of eight nominations. Also in 2004, Diante do Trono founded in Santa Luzia the Diante do Trono Ministerial Training Center (CTMDT), whose mission was to prepare people to work in areas such as praise and missions, in Brazil and around the world.

At the beginning of 2005 Maximiliano Moraes left the group, which, at Sérgio Gomes' request, still worked on the vocal arrangement of the group's next album, but was no longer part of the band's vocal. On 9 July 2005, the Diante do Trono recorded the album Ainda Existe Uma Cruz in Porto Alegre, on the banks of the Guaíba River, attended by over three hundred thousand people and marked by Ana Paula Valadão being pregnant with her first child, a year after she shared her difficulty getting pregnant. The theme of the album came against the Brazilian Christian market, bringing a message that the gospel of Christ brings responsibilities and that it is an arduous path, as in the title song, in addition to "Quero Seguir-Te" and "Coração Todo Teu". The work maintained its excellence of compositions and productions. During the Talent Awards, the group won in three categories.

The following year, on the night of 15 July 2006, the band went to Belém do Pará, a city the group called the "Gateway of the Amazon", for the recording of the album Por Amor de Ti, Oh Brasil, the ninth from the Diante do Trono's series, recorded live at the Yamada Arena, which was attended by over eighty thousand people. The album received mixed reception from the public and critics, and kept songs of praise and worship to God, and a theme of intercession for the nation, with emphasis on "Na Terra Seca", "Rei dos Reis" and "Tu Reinas", the latter that marked much of the audience in the arena, as well as the band itself, spontaneously bending their knees in worship of God. Also that year was released Sem Palavras, the first instrumental album of the group. In the Talent Awards, the group won mostly in the children's album categories.

=== 2007–2010: New cycles ===
In 2007, the ministry of praise completed 10 years of its formation. In celebration of the group's first decade, Diante do Throne recorded the album Tempo de Festa live at Via Funchal in São Paulo, which was a commemorative double CD and DVD featuring the theme songs from each of the first nine albums from Diante do Trono's series, as well as hits such as "Manancial", "Tempo de Festa" and the unreleased song "Amado Salvador", composed by the band leader especially for this work. In addition to the show, the DVD contained a documentary telling the group's story and messages from girls who were rescued by the missionary project in India, which originated the album recordings. It was also the last project that featured pastor Renata Valadão on vocals, which after this album, definitely left the group for health reasons. According to expert critics, the weak point of the event was the lack of innovation. At the International Conference of Praise and Worship that year, the group recorded a second CD and DVD in celebration of 10 years: Com Intensidade, which features only the celebration songs recorded by the group so far.

After the commemorative recordings, the group began preparations for the recording of their tenth album of the Diante do Trono's series. Having fulfilled the call to hold strategic gatherings in all regions of Brazil, the group felt inspired to end the cycle in the city of the first recording of the vision "Brasil Diante do Trono", Rio de Janeiro, but this time with an album of songs unpublished. The group scheduled the event to take place on 7 July 2007. Initially, the group wanted to record in Praça da Apoteose, but there was no authorization from the local government, because the same day would happen in Rio the event "Live Earth", which would require a great attention from the security of the city. The work clomplted the Brasil Diante do Trono collection, with recordings in all regions of Brazil. However, there was a prior authorization to hold the event at Aterro do Flamengo, so the group even announced the venue of the event, however, the Rio de Janeiro authorities did not grant all the necessary authorizations for recording at that location and the event was transferred exactly to Praça da Apoteose, place where the Samba Schools Parade of Rio de Janeiro is traditionally held during Carnival. The change was celebrated by the group, who for years pray and prophesy for the end of Carnival in Brazil, so that place was strategic and representative for them. Thus, on 7 July 2007, the Diante do Trono recorded the album Príncipe da Paz, with an audience of over 100,000 people. In one of the moments of the recording, Ana Paula Valadão again prophesied against the carnival and received from the city hall the symbolic keys of Rio de Janeiro. The album was divided into two moments, the first being marked by strong guitar and brass arrangements, as in the song "Cordeiro e Leão", and a controversial lyrics for the song "Mais Que Vencedor", and a second moment with lyrics and introspective arrangements, as for the songs "Espírito de Vida" and "Autor da Vida". The work also marked the entry of Marine Friesen as the group's vocal backing, as well as Daniel Friesen and Vinicius Bruno in the band, all former students of CTMDT. The work was considered as the end of the "Brasil Diante do Trono" cycle, with recordings in all five regions of Brazil. In the Talent Awards it was the same as the previous year: the group won mostly in the children's categories, but received positive reviews for the work. At the end of the same year, André Valadão and Nívea Soares officially left the group to pursue a solo career.

In January 2008, Diante do Trono entered into a partnership to distribute the works of the group Trazendo a Arca through the independent label of Diante do Trono, as well as with solo albums by Nívea Soares and André Valadão. The purpose of the partnership was to strengthen both groups against piracy. In May 2008, the Diante do Trono first went to a nationally screened TV show and was honored on the Raul Gil Program on BAND channel. The program told the story of the band and other Christian musicians, such as David Quinlan, Marina de Oliveira, Aline Barros, Trazendo a Arca and Adhemar de Campos, paid tribute to the group. On 4 and 5 July, at the Chevrolet Hall in Recife, the group recorded the eleventh album of the Diante do Trono's series: A Canção do Amor. The album took up the concept of the album Quero Me Apaixonar released in 2003, but with a more explicit focus, being all about the love of God towards his children and children with God, as in the title song and "Porque Te Amo". Also that year, Mariana Valadão started her solo career, released an eponymous album, and decided to leave the group.

In 2009, during the International Conference of Praise and Worship Diante do Trono, the group even announced that the traditional recording of that year would take place in Manaus, but the group again had difficulties with bureaucratic issues to make the recording possible. With this, after eight years, the group went back to recording an album of the Diante do Trono's series in their hometown, Belo Horizonte, and so occurred on 1 August 2009, at Praça da Estação. This twelfth album was called Tua Visão and carried a message of confidence in God's will. The album marked the entrance of a new generation of musicians coming from CTMDT, especially vocalists Ana Nóbrega and Israel Salazar. It was also the first to feature a participation of another name known in the Brazilian Christian milieu, Fernanda Brum, in a vocal trio along with Ana Paula Valadão and Nívea Soares in the song "Encontro das Águas". According to expert critics, the work confirmed the need for a musical renewal in the group. Soon after the album was recorded, a partnership was announced between Diante do Trono and Som Livre record label, which would distribute the group's CDs and DVDs throughout Brazil, in addition to opening the doors for regional and national disclosures by Rede Globo and its affiliates. That year, Ana Paula Valadão, along with her family, moved to Dallas, in the United States, which made the group's ministrations at Lagoinha Church happen under the vocal leadership of Ana Nóbrega and Israel Salazar, and Ana Paula returned to Brazil whenever needed for ministry throughout Brazil.

In 2010, during the International Conference of Praise and Worship Diante do Trono, the group announced that that year would be the thirteenth album of the Diante do Trono's series in the city of Barretos. The event was supported by a council of pastors of the city and would take place at the Arena do Peão, a place where traditional festivals in the Brazilian countryside traditionally take place. On the day of the recording, the band did a social work in partnership with Barretos Cancer Hospital, promoting a bone marrow donation campaign. The album recorded there was called Aleluia and was, at the time, the most pop rock of the band, joining the sound of guitars with the brass of the orchestra, in addition to the re-recording of "Este é o Dia" in country rhythm and the participation of the singer Ludmila Ferber in the re-recording of the song "Eis-me Aqui". The song "Canção do Apocalipse" was very successful among the churches of the country, being performed on likes radios around Brazil, the album became the best selling Christian work of 2010 in Brazil. After the release of Aleluia, the group performed for the first time on a Rede Globo TV show, Domingão do Faustão, where they sang "Preciso de Ti" and "Tempo de Festa", in addition to talking with Fausto Silva, participation raised the audience of the program on that date.

=== 2011–2013: Structural changes ===
The ministry of praise Diante do Trono began in 2011 with a significantly different formation, because the brass orchestra, conductor Sérgio Gomes and some vocals such as Helena and João Lúcio Tannure couples, Clay Peterson and Graziela Santos, as well as Soraya Gomes officially left the group, accompanying others who were already pursuing solo careers, such as Nívea Soares, André Valadão and Mariana Valadão. The only members of the group's initial formation that remained were Ana Paula Valadão and Elias Fernandes, other band members were former CTMDT students, some of them had been joining the Diante do Trono since 2007 and 2009, others joined the group as the drummer Tiago Gaúcho. With this new formation, besides the return of Ana Paula Valadão's residence to Brazil, it allowed the group to increase the number of live musical performances in Brazil and abroad, besides bringing significant sound changes to the group's songs. These changes were announced to the public during the 12th International Conference of Praise and Worship, which also marked the beginning of a musical and ministerial exchange with the American group Gateway Worship, from the recording of the album Glória a Deus, a Portuguese version of one of Gateway's works. In addition, the band continued with the distribution of their productions by Som Livre, making their administrative area leaner.

Still in 2011, the Diante do Trono was the hometown of Natal for the recording of the fourteenth album of Diante do Trono's series: Sol da Justiça. The group gathered an audience of more than 120,000 people on 16 July 2011, in Praia do Meio, but the bad weather conditions hindered the completion of the stage assembly, making the event was held again at the Riachuelo Theater, on 18 July, but this time with the planned scenographic structure. The album was a new milestone in the group's history, achieving great commercial success. The song "Me Ama" was one of the most performed on radio stations and churches throughout Brazil. In just one day of release the album sold over fifty thousand copies. During the Promises Awards ceremony in 2011, the group was the most awarded, winning in the Best Ministry of Praise and Best DVD categories. On 10 December, Diante do Throno was at Aterro do Flamengo, in Rio de Janeiro, to participate in the Promises Festival, an event organized and broadcast by Rede Globo, which brought together, in addition to the group, eight more Christian singers: Davi Sacer, Fernanda Brum, Fernandinho, Damares, Preacher Luo, Ludmila Ferber, Regis Danese and Eyshila.

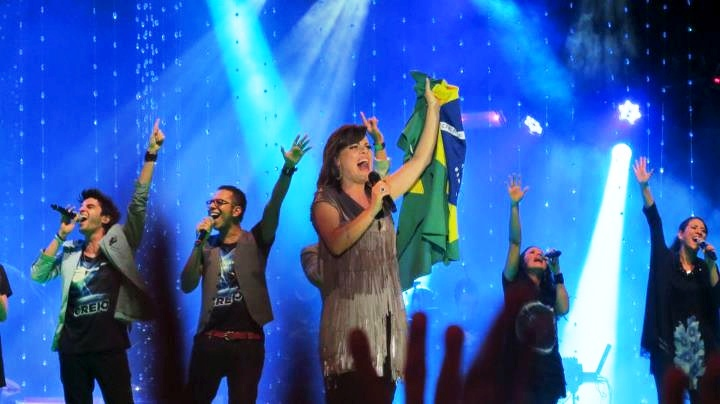
The band in 2012, during the recording of Creio.

On 9 June 2012, the band can finally fulfill their wish to record an album of the Diante do Trono's series in the city of Manaus. The recording was the fifteenth of the series, and was supported by pastors and churches in the city, with an audience of 350,000 people in the Manaus Sambadrome. The album, entitled Creio, was directed by Alex Passos, who chose to do a different work than most audio-visual projects produced at the time, especially in the Christian environment. The event also featured the special appearances of Ludmila Ferber, Thomas Miller, Mariana Valadão, Felippe Valadão, among other musicians. The work received positive reviews from the specialized media, and received considerable acclaim from the public, selling 50,000 copies in just one day. The same work in DVD format became platinum in fifteen days. Also in 2012, Diante do Trono also recorded the album Suomi Valtaistuimen Edessä, an international project in Finnish, featuring re-recordings of the albums Aleluia and Sol da Justiça, as well as participation in the Hillsong Global Project, recording the Portuguese version of the project. In partnership with Hillsong, released by the CanZion label, it sold 40,000 copies, reaching gold disk.

In 2013, in celebration of 15 years of ministry, the band recorded during the 14th Conference of Praise and Worship the album Renovo, which is a rereading of older songs that marked the history of the group in new arrangements and were voted by the public in a poll of a commemorative hotsite launched by the band and created by Quartel Design, which also contained testimonials, stories, photos, polls, among other special materials, mostly of exclusive origin. At the same conference, Ana Paula Valadão announced at an annual event held in Tubarão that annual conferences would focus more on Intercession and Missions, in addition to Praise and Worship. In May of that year, the Diante do Trono was featured on Billboard Brasil with the songs "Creio", "Canta Minh'alma" and "Me Ama". In the same year, the vocalist Ana Nóbrega signed a contract with Som Livre record label to release her second solo career, being the first since joining the band, titled Nada Temerei. The release of the album also marked the departure of Ana Nóbrega from Diante do Trono. Shortly after, Ana Paula Valadão announced the departure of other vocals of the band, such as the couple Rodrigo and Saara Campos, Guilherme Fares, Sebastião Batista and Roberta Izabel.

On 6 July 2013, the Diante do Trono gathered about 30,000 people at the Padre Cicero Event Park in Juazeiro do Norte, for the recording of the sixteenth album of the Diante do Trono's series, entitled Tu Reinas. In addition to the main gathering, the group toured small communities in the northeastern backlands and recorded the same songs more intimately in an unprecedented initiative, as an incentive for social and missionary actions in one of the poorest regions of Brazil that suffered that year with one of the worst droughts ever recorded in the region. The album's repertoire contains re-readings of some of the band's hits and three unreleased tracks, including "Rasga os Céus", which was marked by a light rain in the Northeast drought, and was much celebrated by the group members. The album featured guest appearances by Juliano Son of the band Livres para Adorar, André Valadão and Mariana Valadão, and the visual direction of Alex Passos. At the same time, the band released a custom clothing shop, "DT Wear", containing books, accessories, footwear and clothing with messages of songs of the band. The recording of the project marked the end of the partnership between Diante do Trono and Som Livre, which for reasons never disclosed by either party, decided that the label would not distribute the new album, causing the Diante do Trono to just release the album the following year, after the end of the contract with the parties, returning to the independent format.

=== 2014–2017: From Brazil to the nations ===
The year 2014 began, the band was preparing to record their seventeenth album of the Diante do Trono's series, and their first live recording outside of Brazil, the chosen venue was Israel. The name of the project was called Tetelestai, as this was the word spoken by Jesus on Calvary and means "It is finished." In May, a caravan organized by the group left for Israel, with about 382 caravans. On 13 May, the recording took place in the Tower of David in Jerusalem, in addition to the caravans, other people also attended, the event gathered about 557 people. On 15 May, the recordings took place in the Garden of the Empty Tomb and the Mount of Olives. The project had the special participation of André Valadão, Asaph Borba, Rosana Borba and Ana Lúcia Câmara, André Borba, son of Asaph Borba and Isaque Valadão, son of Ana Paula Valadão, who played violin in this project, directed by Alex Passos and again with many innovations. In June 2015, the band released Tetelestai, and held a pre-release album tour of several cities in Brazil. During the pre-release of the project, the band participated in the Ratinho's Program, on SBT channel, on 8 July. After the recording period of the album, the band performed an international tour through Europe, passing through Portugal, England, Belgium, Germany, Finland and France, while passing through Finland, the band released their second album in Finnish by the project Nations Before the Throne, titled Läpimurto, with songs, recorded in Finnish, from Creio, Renovo and Tu Reinas. A choir of approximately 100 voices awaited the Diante do Trono upon their arrival in Finland to sing in front of the Finnish parliament on the parliamentary stairs, with the album being released. On 12 August, the second album in partnership with Gateway Worship was recorded at Lagoinha Church, entitled Deus Reina, members of the Gateway Church were present in the recording.

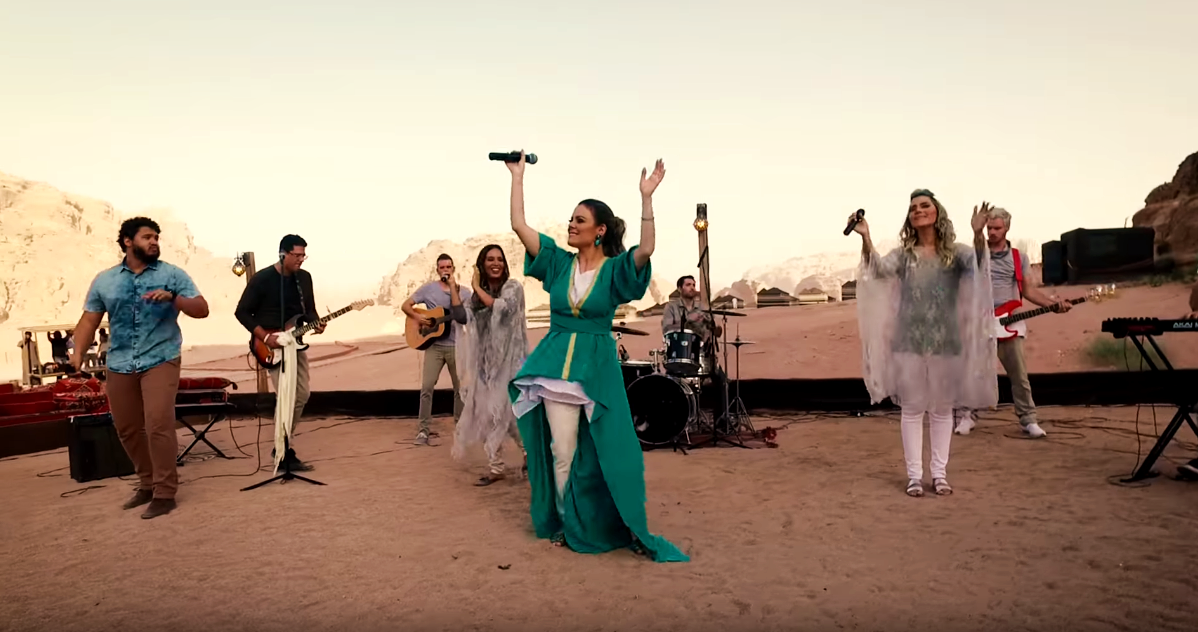
The band during the recording of Deserto de Revelação, in 2017.

Due to the release of the album Tu Reinas only occurred in 2014, Tetelestai's release schedule was delayed, the latter being released in June 2015. To commemorate the great achievement of the project recorded live in Israel, the band performed a pre-release tour of the album. The tour toured several cities in Brazil. During the pre-launch of the project, Ana Paula Valadão held an afternoon of autographs at the Saraiva bookstore at Center Norte Mall in São Paulo and participated in the Ratinho Program at SBT on 8 July, where the singer released the work and sang some songs. In September 2015, took place at Lagoinha Church, the recording of the album Pra Semper Teu, in a new partnership with Gateway Worship. The album was attended by Juliano Son, Fernanda Brum, Nívea Soares, among others. In the same year, Israel Salazar and Marine Friesen released their first solo albums entitled "Jesus" and "Alfa & Ômega", respectively. 2015 marked the official entrance of Gustavo Bessa, the husband of Ana Paula Valadão, in the executive direction of Diante do Trono, and at the end of that year Ana Paula and Gustavo, along with their sons Isaque and Benjamim, returned to live in the United States, where Ana Paula became a worship pastor at Gateway Church. In the same year, the band signed with the record label Onimusic for the publicity and distribution of all its audiovisual works.

In 2016, a new project in partnership with Gateway was recorded in Brazil: the album Muralhas, recorded live at the Biblical Church of Peace, in São Paulo, and was attended by Fernandinho, Fred Arrais, Nívea Soares, among others. In the same year, the group recorded in the United States the CD Imersão, all in Soaking Music style, which are spontaneous songs, which have always been a trademark of the Diante do Trono. The album consists of 21 songs or "moments" as defined by the ministry leader. In 2017, during the conference of Worship, Intercession and Mission, the group recorded the second volume of this series, Imersão 2, with arrangements by Gustavo Soares and the participation of Nívea Soares and the couple Fred and Flávia Arrais.

After a few years of preparation, the band recorded their second album outside their home nation and the eighteenth of the Diante do Trono's series. The visual album Deserto de Revelação was recorded in June 2017 during a caravan for Jordan and Israel. It was recorded in places like Wadi Rum, Jerash, Petra, Little Petra, Sea of Galilee, among others, and reaffirmed the pop rock sound adopted by the group in its second decade of existence. Visual direction was again taken over by Alex Passos and visual art by Salt Agency. The album featured the participation of singer Asaph Borba in the song "Rio de Lágrimas". This was considered by Ana Paula Valadão as her most authoritative and personal album ever made by the ministry of praise Diante do Trono. This was the first work fully focused on digital media, first released on streaming platforms, later having a physical CD release, but no DVD releases, and the music videos released directly on the group's YouTube channel. The album received mixed reception by critics, with positive highlight for the song "Amor Que Me Abraça". The response from the public on the digital streaming and download platforms was positive, making the album, in its release week, reach the first place of the gospel genre and second place in iTunes Brasil, the most heard album on the Deezer platform and the most heard among religious records on the Google Play platform.

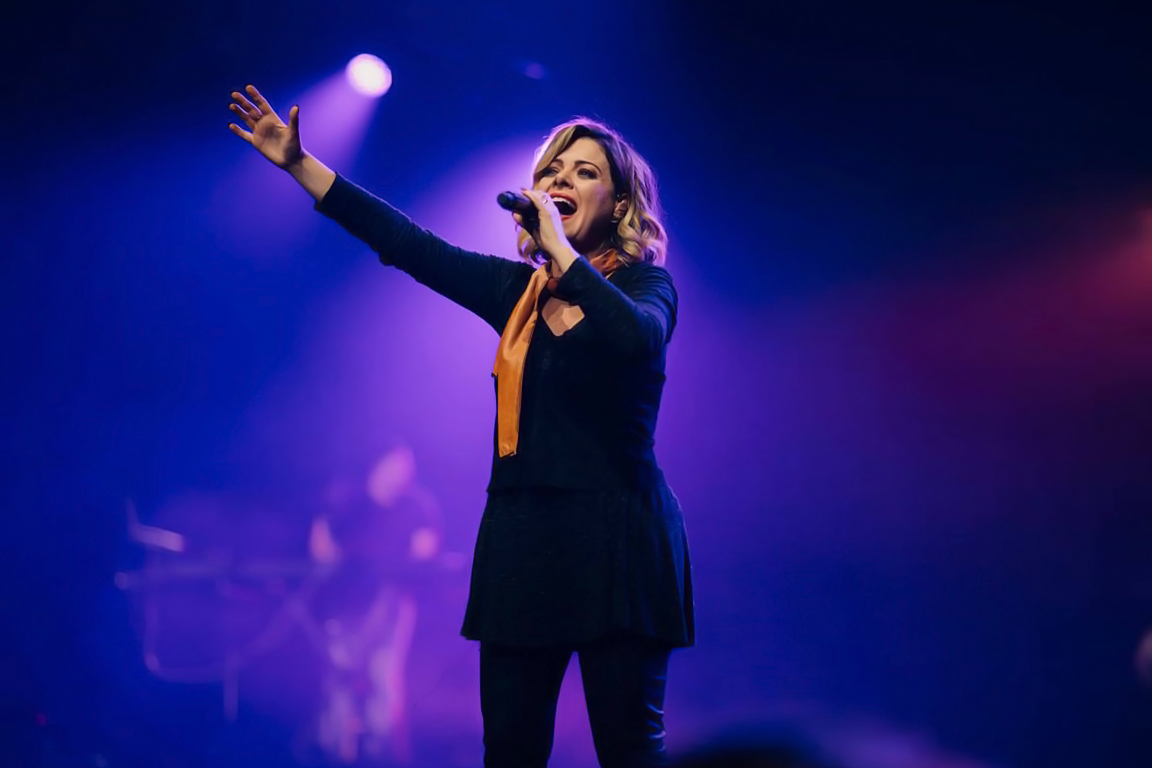
Ana Paula Valadão, leader of Diante do Trono, at Christ for the Nations Institute, in Dallas, Texas.

=== 2018-present: 20 years; Before the Throne Church; Outra Vez ===
The year 2018 began with the remembrance of the Diante do Trono's 20-year milestone through posts on the band's social networks and members and former members of the group. In late January, Ana Paula Valadão began posting weekly videos on the group's YouTube channel recalling the history of the ministry, divided by each year and album released by the Diante do Trono's series. Also in the same period was announced that the theme of the conference of Worship, Intercession and Mission of that year would be "Times and Seasons" and with special programming in celebration of the band's 20 years. The conference, which took place during Holy Week, featured a reunion of different group formations, such as vocalists Ana Paula Valadão, Ana Nóbrega, André Valadão, Clay Peterson, Graziela Santos, Helena Tannure, Israel Salazar, João Lúcio Tannure, Leticia Brandão, Mariana Valadão, Marine Friesen, Nívea Soares and Roberta Izabel, as well as keyboardist Gustavo Soares, conductor Sérgio Gomes and members of the brass orchestra, who together gave the praise at the opening of the conference. The album Imersão 3 was also recorded live, with the participation of Ana Nóbrega, André Valadão, Israel Salazar, Mariana Valadão, Marine Friesen and Nívea Soares, and the Musical 20 Anos Diante do Trono, with the participation of the choir El-Shammah, conducted by Robinho, from Lagoinha Church. Both musical projects have not yet been released. During the conference, Ana Paula Valadão shared messages and chats reminding the group's history, sharing what she would do differently and what she believes should not change in the band, as well as testimonies of miracles achieved by the intercession led by Ezenete Rodrigres and stories about the group's missionary project in India.

During the 2018 conference, Ana Paula Valadão also shared that she and her husband, Gustavo Bessa, will pastor a Lagoinha Church in Miami, United States. The following month, it was announced by the couple's social networks that the church in Miami will be called Before the Throne Church - by Lagoinha, indicating that they are still directly connected to the Lagoinha Church. The new church will have its own continuing and expanding identity of the ministry.

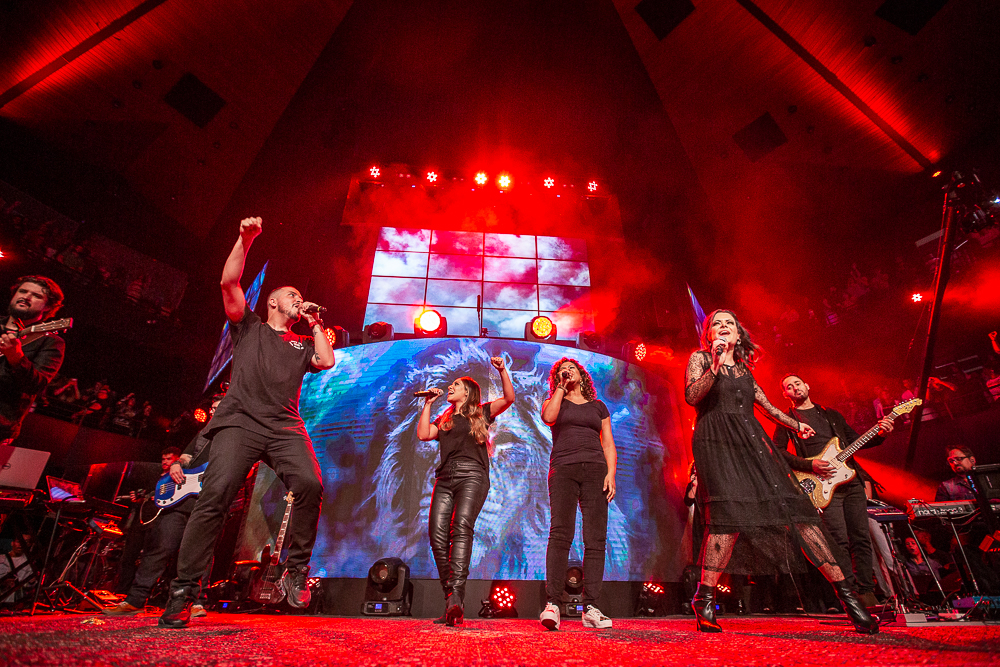
Isaias Saad, Gabriela Rocha, Nívea Soares and Ana Paula Valadão during the recording of the album Outra Vez at Lagoinha Church.

On 19 April 2019, during the Diante do Trono conference, the ministry recorded its 19th album from the Diante do Trono series, titled Outra Vez. The title track is a Portuguese version of Elevation Worship's song "Do It Again" and was versioned by Ana Paula and her friend Raquel Kerr. The album marked the return of live recordings in Brazil, with Belo Horizonte being the city chosen after 10 years (since the album Tua Visão) and the Lagoinha Church as a stage after 20 years (since the album Exaltado). The album was produced by Gustavo Soares and featured guest appearances by Isaias Saad, Gabriela Rocha and Nívea Soares. The full album contains 13 tracks, 9 copyright and 4 versions. The release was split into two parts, volume 1 being released on all streaming platforms on 17 September of the same year, containing 7 tracks. The release of volume 2, with the remaining 6 tracks of the project, has not yet been announced.

== Discography ==
Discography of Diante do Trono consists of over twenty-five live albums, nine children's albums, and four studio albums. The works produced brought several awards and sold over 15 million copies. Recordings took place in cities in all regions of Brazil, as well as international recordings in Israel, Jordan and the United States.

Diante do Trono's series

- Diante do Trono (1998)
- Exaltado (1999)
- Águas Purificadoras (2000)
- Preciso de Ti (2001)
- Nos Braços do Pai (2002)
- Quero Me Apaixonar (2003)
- Esperança (2004)
- Ainda Existe Uma Cruz (2005)
- Por Amor de Ti, Oh Brasil (2006)
- Príncipe da Paz (2007)
- A Canção do Amor (2008)
- Tua Visão (2009)
- Aleluia (2010)
- Sol da Justiça (2011)
- Creio (2012)
- Tu Reinas (2014)
- Tetelestai (2015)
- Deserto de Revelação (2017)
- Outra Vez (2019)
- Respirar (2021)
- Sim e Amém (2023)

Compilations and specials

- Aclame ao Senhor with Hillsong (2000)
- Shalom Jerusálem with Paul Wilbur (2000)
- Brasil Diante do Trono (2001)
- Tempo de Festa: 10 Anos (2007)
- Com Intensidade: 10 Anos (2008)
- Glória a Deus with Gateway Worship (2012)
- Suomi Valtaistuimen Edessä (2012)
- Global Project: Português with Hillsong (2012)
- Renovo: 15 Anos (2013)
- Läpimurto (2014)
- Deutschland vor dem Thron (2015)
- Deus Reina with Gateway Worship (2015)
- Pra Sempre Teu with Gateway Worship (2016)
- Imersão (2016)
- Imersão 2 (2017)
- Muralhas with Gateway Worship (2017)
- Eu e a Minha Casa (2018)
- Imersão 3 (2019)
- Imersão 4 (2020)
- Extras Diante do Trono (2021)
- Imersão 5 (2022)
- Memórias do Coração: 25 Anos (2023)
- De Nós Se Lembrará (2025)
- Delante Del Trono (2026)

== Musical style and influences ==
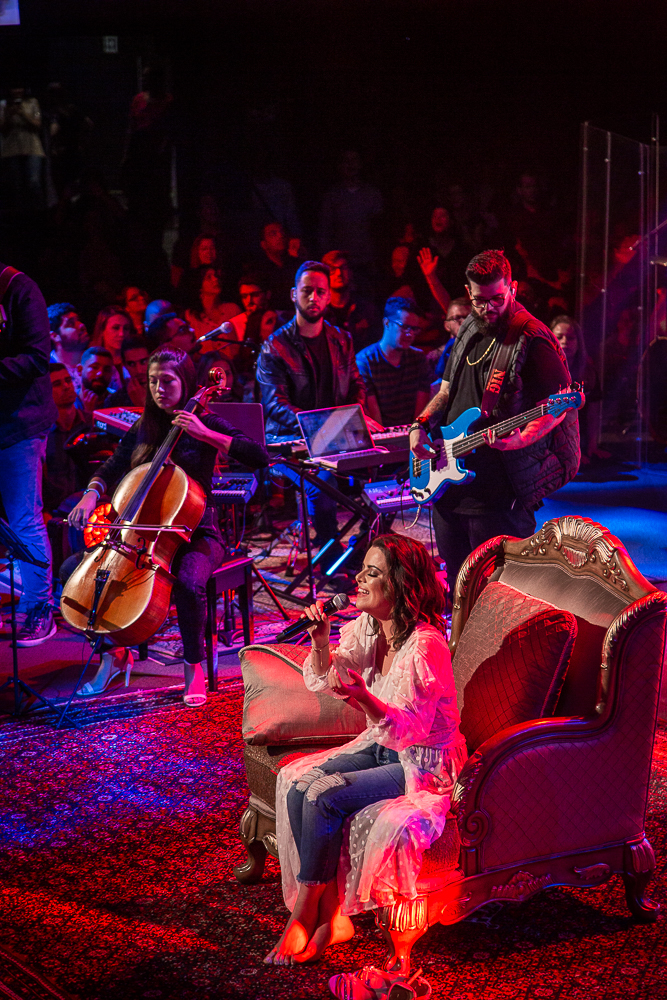
Diante do Trono during the recording of the album Outra Vez, in 2019.

Since the first album, the group has had roots of congregational singing in instrumental part. The band's orchestra was a hallmark of the group's works released between 1998 and 2010, making the heavy, dense sound of brass the main musical feature of the group. The departure of the band's orchestra brought a renewal of the group's arrangements from the 2011 album Sol da Justiça. Since then, the Diante do Trono has taken on pop rock influences in their arrangements.

The Diante do Trono's main musical references are from foreign worship ministries, notably the Australian group Hillsong and the American group Gateway Worship. The Brazilian band even recorded several albums in partnership with these ministries. Another reference of the band is the American group Jesus Culture, which had some of their versioned songs, such as "Canção do Apocalipse" from the album Aleluia, "Me Ama" from the album Sol da Justiça, and "Santo" from the album Tu Reinas. The song "Aclame ao Senhor" featured on the album Diante do Trono was another notable version of Hillsong leader Darlene Zschech.

In addition to influencing various church worship ministries in Brazil, the Diante do Trono also influenced Brazilian musicians, such as the Evangelical group Toque no Altar/Trazendo a Arca, and the Catholic singer Marcelo Rossi, who re-recorded the song "Seja o Centro", from the album Quero Me Apaixonar, in his album Minha Benção, released in 2006.

== Other projects ==
=== Crianças Diante do Trono ===
The Crianças Diante do Trono project started from a desire of the band to take their songs in language aimed at children, using animated characters and children from Lagoinha Church.

The first album aimed at children was the Crianças Diante do Trono, released in 2001. The album was very successful, besides containing the song "Aos Olhos do Pai", which is one of the band's best known songs by the general public. After the good repercussion of the work, they launched eight more: Amigo de Deus, Quem é Jesus?, Vamos Compartilhar, A Arca de Noé, Samuel, o Menino que Ouviu Deus, Para Adorar ao Senhor, Amigos do Perdão, Davi, Renovo Kids, DT Babies and Pó-De-Crescer were released.

Some versions of the Crianças Diante do Trono's series were even produced in other languages for distribution in countries such as Albania, Poland and Turkey. The goal would be to promote evangelism through the Christian language-language messages contained in the group's productions.

Through albums, the group has won the Talent Awards for several years and is recognized for producing some of the highest quality children's albums in the Brazilian music market.

=== Ministerial Training Center Diante do Trono (CTMDT) ===
In the year 2000, when Pastor João Osmar and his wife, Pastor Lylian Abucater, were at the head of the Teenagers Network of Lagoinha Church and because of the couple's missionary experience with YWAM (Youth with a Mission, missionary institution). João Osmar suggested that Lagoinha, within the teenagers ministry, should develop a missionary training to go to the nations. Pastor Márcio Valadão (Senior of Lagoinha Church) then gave support to start the project of qualification and formation in the church. On a site in Melo Viana the first pillars of this project were founded, which was initially called CFMDT (Missionary Training Center Diante do Trono). With the school began a work of evangelism and cells in the homes of the region. In order to optimize this vision, namely the local church association, praise and worship and missions, the idea of the creation of the Ministerial Training Center Diante do Trono (CTMDT) as a school was born in mid-2003, that could relate praise and worship and cross-cultural missions. After a while, in 2004 the project was born, the vision broadened and the couple Gustavo Bessa and Ana Paula Valadão took over the direction of the Seminar, joining efforts with João and Lylian to achieve this project. The group acquired a property in Santa Luzia and in 2005, CTMDT was established in this headquarters that has a housing building with 52 suites and capacity for over 200 people, a recreation area with two swimming pools, a sports court and gardens, a restaurant and industrial kitchen, and an educational building with several classrooms. In 2009, with Gustavo Bessa and Ana Paula Valadão going to the United States, the couple Clay Peterson and Graziela Santos, vocalists of the Diante do Trono, took over in support of João and Lyllian.

At CTMDT, there were names like Marine Friesen, Ana Nóbrega and Israel Salazar, and some music albums were produced by downtown classes, such as the Viver Por Ti, Não Haverá Limites and Tu És Tudo Para Mim CDs, as well as from the EP Dependente. Missionary work was also the fruit of CTMDT, such as missions carried out in the Amazon, Sertão, Europe, Africa and elsewhere.

At the end of 2017, Diante do Trono informed that from 2018, would not have the courses in the format of boarding school. However, they would be evaluating the possibility of implementing the Distance Learning system, which would allow the continued application of content and also the participation of students from various parts of Brazil and the world, and with this readjustment, we can cover a lot more people and churches, and make a significant contribution to the formation of the Church.

=== Diante do Trono's conferences ===
Since 2000, the ministry of praise Diante do Trono promotes during the Holy Week holiday a conference in the city of Belo Horizonte, bringing together people from various parts of Brazil and the world who usually organize in caravans to attend the traditional event. The conference promotes worship services, chats and preaching with Diante do Trono members or national and international guests, focusing on Bible-related themes and context, as well as moments of intercession and worship of God. Until 2013 the event was titled International Conference of Praise and Worship Diante do Trono, from 2014 to 2015 it was called Conference of Worship and Intercession Diante do Trono and since 2016 it is called Conference of Worship, Intercession and Mission Diante do Trono. From 2000 to 2002 the event took place in the temple of Lagoinha Church, from 2003 to 2007 it took place at Mineirinho Gymnasium, in 2008 it took place at Chevrolet Hall, from 2009 to 2011 it happened again at Lagoinha Church, from 2012 to 2014 it took place at Expominas and since 2015 again returned to the temple of Lagoinha Church. The events are recorded on video and broadcast on DVD/VHS, via the Rede Super or through the band's YouTube channel. Some recordings of albums have already been recorded during the conferences, such as the Mais Que Abundante, Milagres and Alegria albums by André Valadão, Rio, by Nívea Soares, Com Intensidade, Glória a Deus, Renovo, Imersão 2, Imersão 3 and Outra Vez, by Diante do Trono.

In 2011, also at Lagoinha Church, the band created the Women Diante do Trono Conference, led by Ana Paula Valadão. And from 2015, parallel to the women's event, the Men Diante do Trono Conference, led by Gustavo Bessa, took place. And since 2017 the two conferences have been unified, so-called Men and Women Diante do Trono Conference, taking place in the main temple of Lagoinha and, according to Gustavo Bessa, is for men and women, both married couples, as well as single, divorced and married. widowed. The purpose of these events is to focus the family in the light of the Bible, and in this sense, various chats, preaching, as well as praise, worship and intercession are promoted. The events are also broadcast on Rede Super and the band's YouTube channel.

Some compact and traveling versions of these Diante do Trono-sponsored conferences eventually take place in other cities in Brazil.

=== Missão DT ===
Since recording the Diante do Trono's first album in 1998, the group has aimed to develop missionary and social projects, especially in India, where Pastor Marcio Valadão, along with a pastoral team from Lagoinha Church, had visited in 1997 and sensitized with a strong scenario of child prostitution. So Ana Paula Valadão and Sérgio Gomes took on the challenge of recording an album where part of the proceeds went to Church missionary action in India. With the success of the group formed by them, the Diante do Trono since 2000 has been developing a social project in the Indian territory that provides integral care for girls who lived in various situations of risk and vulnerability. More than 500 girls have been reached and cared for, including housing, food, education, English classes, vocational courses, medical and spiritual care.

And in 2017, during the Conference of Worship, Intercession and Mission Diante do Trono, held annually in Belo Horizonte, Ana Paula, together with her husband Gustavo Bessa, announced the creation of the project "Missão DT", which is the unification in a single project all the social and missionary actions developed by the Diante do Trono. Currently, in addition to India Project, the Israel Project has been announced, which encourages missionary work in the Israeli nation and promotes social action for Syrian and Iraqi refugees in Jordan. And in Brazil, Sertão Project, focused on the area that, according to the group, is the least evangelized region in the country, the group has promoted actions such as the recording of the album Tu Reinas in 2013 and the band's conferences to draw the attention of Brazil and the world to the needs of the Brazilian Sertão, in addition, the group is linked to other partners who have since received support from the ministry so that not only the Gospel is taken to the needy people, but also, so that they have decent human conditions to live.

=== Diante do Trono's label ===
Since its first album, released in 1998, Diante do Trono has worked on the production, dissemination and distribution of its materials independently. In 2003, after an internal administrative overhaul, the group officially created their own record label, bearing the group's name and having a track record of highly successful material in Brazil, such as the albums Águas Purificadoras, Preciso de Ti and Nos Braços do Pai. In addition to the group's own materials, Nívea Soares was part of the label's casting with her first three albums from 2003 to 2007, Reina Sobre Mim, Enche-me de Ti and Rio, and André Valadão also with his first six albums from 2004 to 2008, Mais Que Abundante, Milagres, Alegria, Clássicos, Sobrenatural and Clássicos de Natal.

Both Nívea Soares and André Valadão had direct links with the Diante do Trono as they were also vocalists of the group, the Diante do Trono also worked with the albums of Crianças Diante do Trono and CTMDT. In 2008, the Diante do Trono announced that they would also distribute albums from a group that had not had a direct link to the group, the Trazendo a Arca, with the albums Marca da Promessa and Ao Vivo no Japão. The initiative would be to combat piracy, joining forces in the Brazilian Christian music market without having any direct ministerial involvement.

However, in 2009, the record label Diante do Trono ended its activities and the band signed a disclosure and distribution agreement with Som Livre, from Grupo Globo. The partnership between the band and the record label Som Livre lasted until 2014, when the group became independent again and released two albums of their own, Tu Reinas and Tetelestai, in addition to the album Jesus, by Israel Salazar, band's vocalist. In 2015, the group signed a contract with Onimusic, which has since been responsible for the dissemination and distribution of works produced by Diante do Trono.

== Recognition ==
Throughout its career, the Diante do Trono has achieved remarkable marks for a Christian music band: it was the only Brazilian gospel ensemble to receive a tribute on a television show; has performed for more than two million people at a concert in the city of São Paulo; besides being the only band participating in Promises Festival. The group has already toured in Europe, the United States, Asia, among other places.

Specialist criticism considers that the whole is diversified in its compositions, with deep lyrics, poetry, words that bring repentance, among other subjects.

The Diante do Trono has already participated in several television programs, especially Programa Raul Gil, Eliana, Domingão do Faustão, Caldeirão do Huck, Encontro com Fátima Bernardes, Altas Horas, Programa do Ratinho and many other news programs. In 2012, Ana Paula Valadão was listed in the Most Important Brazilian of All Time election, being the only Christian singer on the list. The following year, Forbes magazine published a list in which the Diante do Trono's leader, Ana Paula Valadão is one of the 100 most influential celebrities in Brazil. In September 2013, Ana Paula Valadão participed of the frame "Crianças Curiosas" in Raul Gil Program and shortly thereafter, received the invitation to participate in Teleton 2013. The following year, the singer participated again and was featured in singing the song Aos Olhos do Pai in national network. In October 2013, UOL published a special report about the Diante do Trono's 15 years, were interviewed Ana Paula Valadão, André Valadão, Mariana Valadão, Nívea Soares, Helena Tannure, Ana Nóbrega, among many others.

== Awards and nominations ==
During its years of existence, the Diante do Trono received 61 nominations in Talent Awards between the 2002 and 2009. Of the 61 indications it received, it won in 24, or 39.3% of them. The most successful year of the set was that of 2004, when they received 8 nominations and won in 7.

In the first edition of the Promises Awards in 2011 the ministry was nominated in 5 categories and won in two, being the most awarded of the night. Promises Awards 2012, received 5 nominations passed through two stages of the awards with five nominations and won two, which represents 40% of them. Knowing that these first two editions of the largest Brazilian Christian music awards Promises Awards, the ministry is the biggest winner, along with Thalles Roberto with four awards.

In 2012 and 2026 the group was nominated for a Latin Grammy for Best Christian Album of Music in Portuguese.
