= Thomas Miller (pastor) =

American singer-songwriter (born 1970)

- Born: Thomas Harrison Miller Jr. September 27, 1970 (age 56); Charleston, West Virginia
- Origin: Dallas, Texas, United States
- Genres: Contemporary Christian, contemporary worship
- Occupations: Singer-songwriter, executive senior pastor, worship pastor
- Instruments: Vocals, piano
- Years active: 2003–present
- Labels: Integrity Music, Fair Trade Services

Thomas Harrison Miller Jr. (born September 27, 1970) is an American contemporary Christian music singer, songwriter and pastor. He was an executive pastor at Gateway Church in Southlake, Texas and was formerly the church's senior worship leader. In the latter role, he oversaw Gateway Worship, Gateway Create Publishing, The Blessed Life TV and Gateway Conference.

== Biography ==
Thomas was born, Thomas Harrison Miller Jr., on September 27, 1970, in Charleston, West Virginia. He relocated to Dallas, Texas to start his ministry, and is married to Mary Beth Miller and father of Harrison Miller.

Between 1995 and 1997 he studied Theology at the Christ for the Nations Institute, along with his wife Mary Beth. While at CFNI, they met Ana Paula Valadão, a student from Brazil who later became the leader of the worship ministry Diante do Trono, the main worship ministry in Latin America.

In 2003, Thomas became worship pastor at Gateway Church. Under his leadership, Gateway Worship one of the main praise ministries in the United States. Thomas is a composer of several worship songs, like "O The Blood" which was composed along with his wife.

In 2010, Gateway Worship partnered with Valadão's praise band, Diante do Trono. Two years later, Valadão invited Miller to participate in the recording of her band's 15th live album, titled Creio, the album was recorded at the Sambadrome, in the city of Manaus, Brazil, gathering more 350 thousand people.

== Discography ==
=== Studio albums with Gateway Worship ===
- Unsearchable (2003)
- Masterpiece (2003) (Released under the name Gatewayouth, formerly Gateway Church's youth ministry, currently known as GatewayStudents and Gateway Generate)
- Drawing Closer: Songs from Gateway Devotions (2006)
- The Battle: Songs from Gateway Devotions (2007)
- First: Songs from Gateway Devotions (2008)
- My Beloved (2009)
- (Songs Inspired By) Conversations with God (2009)
- Let's Go: Songs from Gateway Devotions (2010)
- The More I Seek You (2011)
- In Jesus Name: Songs from Gateway Devotions (2012)
- Love Expressed: Songs from Gateway Devotions (2013)
- The Blessed Life: Songs from Gateway Devotions (2015)

=== Live albums with Gateway Worship ===
- Living for You (2006)
- Wake Up the World (2008)
- God Be Praised (2010)
- Great, Great God (EP) (2011)
- Forever Yours (2012)
- WALLS (2015)

=== Compilation albums with Gateway Worship ===
- The First 10 Years (2013)
- Gateway Worship Voices: Thomas Miller (2016)
