= Creio =

Live album by Diante do Trono
- Released: 25 September 2012
- Recorded: 9 June 2012, Sambadrome of Manaus, Manaus, Amazonas, Brazil (350,000 people present)
- Genre: Contemporary worship music
- Length: 73:40 (CD) and 117:47 (DVD & blu-ray)
- Label: Som Livre
- Producer: Diante do Trono

Diante do Trono Live Praise & Worship chronology
Sol da Justiça (2011)	Creio (2012)	Tu Reinas (2013)

Creio is the fifteenth album in the live praise and worship series of Contemporary worship music by Diante do Trono.

== Pre-recording ==
In the pre-recording of the Creio, the mining group released the Sol da Justiça album, recorded at the Beach of Meio and Riachuelo Theater, in Natal.

== Recording and award ==
Creio was recorded on June 9, 2012, in Manaus, Amazonas, during and after the March for Jesus and released on September 25 of that year. The work celebrates the fifteen-year history of the group with an album produced by Vinícius Bruno and Jarley Brandão, with several cameos. The work was directed by Alex Passos.

In 2013, Creio won for Best CD of Trophy Promises.

== History ==
In 2009, Diante do Trono expressed interest in recording a live album in Manaus. This happened with Tua Visão, which initially would be recorded in the city, but the event was canceled, making the work was recorded in Belo Horizonte.

In the earlier recording Creio year, Diante do Trono launched Sol da Justiça, recorded in Natal, which sold fifty thousand copies in its first days of release. The joint celebration by then, his fourteen years of successful career in the Christian community.

== 2012 release ==
In February 2012, the band released the recording of the work would be on June 2 in an undefined location of Manaus. Distribution of the work, like the previous titles would be done by the secular label Som Livre. Later that month, the Diante do Trono released a logo developed by Quartel Design celebrating fifteen years of the group. For the fifteenth album was already estimated an audience of six hundred thousand people.

The following month, the event had set the date and location, June 9 at the Sambadrome of Manaus, during late March for Jesus in Manaus. As of March 17, 2012, the band has opened registration for people interested in joining the choir that would be part of the recording. According to the organizers, it was not necessary experience, only knowing the songs that would be interpreted in the recording. Submissions were made on the official website of the band through a register.

In early May of that year, Ana Paula Valadão announced the name of the work: Creio. Later that month, the hot-site recording, titled with the name of the eponymous book was released. Such hot-site, developed by Quartel Design was divided into three parts: One had the lyrics and the other showed inscriptions coral and caravans for recording.

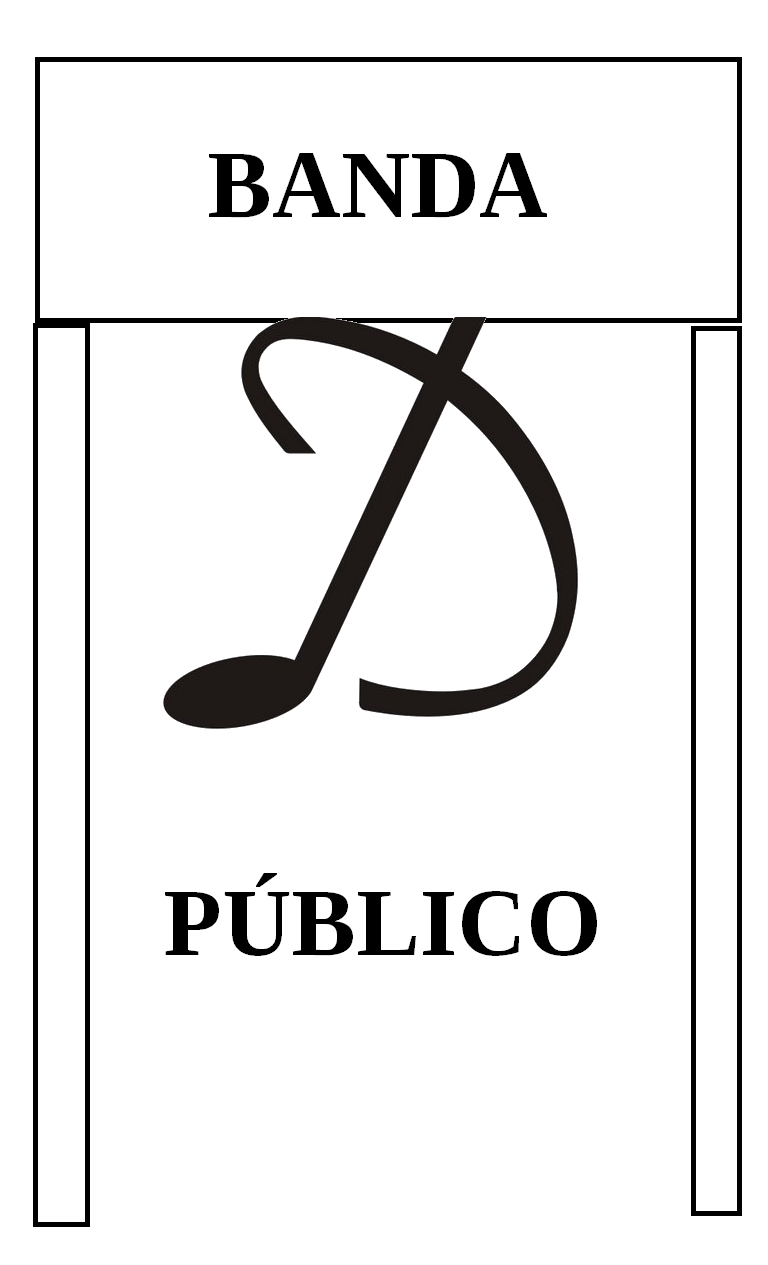
Design stage built in recording Creio.

On June 2, missing a week for recording, Diante do Trono performed the traditional rehearsal, where the band performed a week before a live recording.

At the beginning of the month the stage was already being set up at the end of the Sambadrome to ensure the use of the grandstand and walkways. Still, it was reported that the structure would be in a D-shaped, in allusion to the whole logo. To avoid the inconvenience caused by rain in burning ‘’Sol da Justiça’’, the technical team from Diante do Trono working with a material that is resistant to rain, ensuring that recording I believe was carried out without a hitch.

== Video album ==
Diante do Trono chose Alex Passos to be the director of the video album. Alex had worked on several successful productions, respectively. The director decided to make a different from previous work done by the group. According to him, thirteen cameras would be used during the event and crazy things happen, like a door on stage that Ana Paula would come, but that the DVD would go somewhere else, that would be using clips interspersed with images of the live recording.

The Italian clothing company Follow J was responsible for making a line of t-shirts for the members of Diante do Trono recording and used them for sale later. These shirts have representations of fauna and flora, as well as hydrography of the state of Amazonas.

== Interview ==
The day before the recording, Alex Passos gave an interview where he said his expectations in relation to that record saying he was having fun with all that the public expects. Also stated that it is not the director of the recording, but the DVD, so I was bringing innovations to the audio-visual record.

It is a feature somewhat like my head: in Thalles I created a stage different from the main stage, in the Mariana did a catwalk LED, it's my tendency to leave the traditional stage because the stage is something for everyone, and if you not give an identity to him, he is like any other...

— Alex Passos commenting on stage their productions.

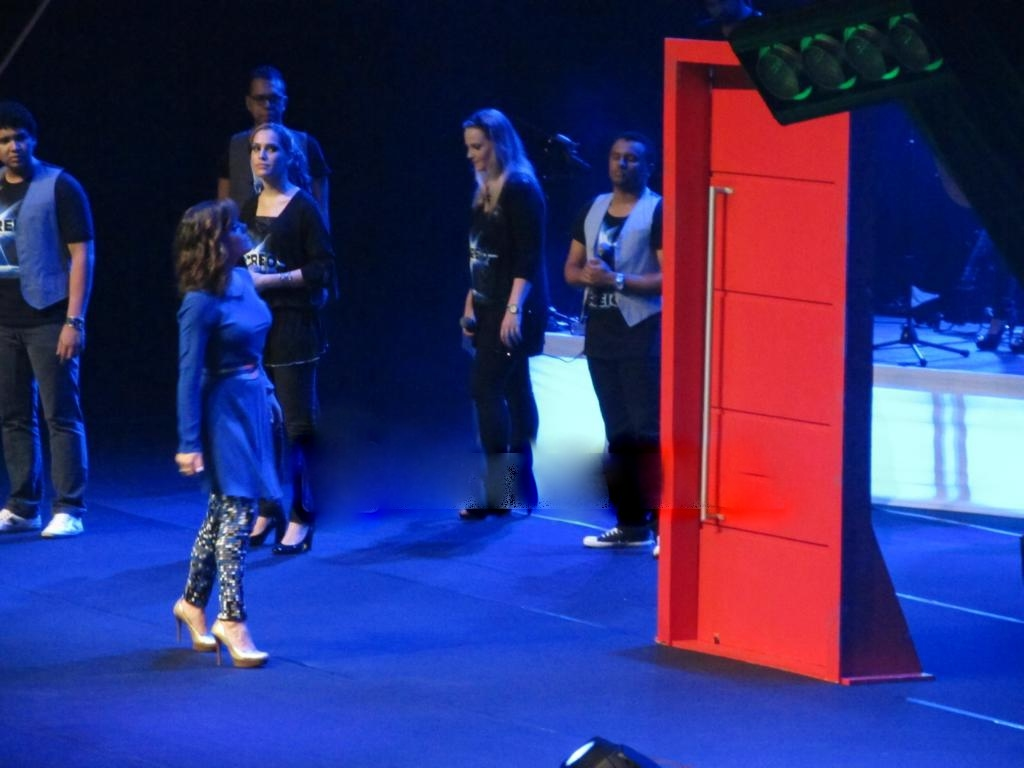
The stage door used by Ana Paula Valadão.

The Day June 9, 2012 arrived and Creio recording was performed. The Diante do Trono could muster in the Sambadrome, 350,000 people. However, according to the military police throughout the march were 750-800 thousand people. Due to the large presence of the public, Roger Oliver commented in his report published on the website: "I believe the project says that the gospel has its mainstream and that a ministry of 15 years on the road can still cause so much success in the media generally only burn a CD and DVD. had the Beatles in rock, pop Michael Jackson and the gospel we have the Ministry of Praise Diante do Trono".

== Choir ==
The recording featured a choir of ten thousand people in white gloves on hands, at the end sang "Happy Birthday", which ended up surprising the musicians in the band. All members walked in "D" while the audience shouted: "Pula, leaves the ground, 15 years of anointing" Colored balls were thrown by angels at that time.<

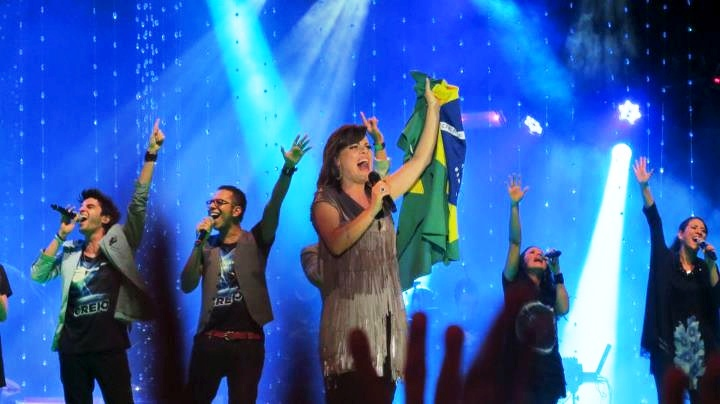
Members of Diante do Trono recording of Creio. Ana Paula Valadão is ahead with Flag of Brazil.

After recording, Diante do Trono remained in Amazonas state where they recorded the clips that were part of the audio-visual record of the work. One of the local Indian tribe was Hywi, visited by artist Ana Paula Valadão, which was recorded scenes for the song "Preciso de Ti". The singer sang for the children and bathed in the Negro River with them.

In August, the Quartel Design released the graphic design of the disc, which features a picture of the fireworks show took place at the Sambadrome during the event, with the title Creio, emphasizing the word "rei" ("king") formed with the union of three existing letters in the title of works.

Ana Paula Valadão also told that for the recording of each project, are thought on the characteristics of the regions where the events are held.

== Track listings ==
=== CD ===
Song	Author	Worship Leader	Duration
Toma o Teu Lugar	Ana Paula Valadão	Ana Paula Valadão	5:40
Canta Minh'alma	Ana Paula Valadão	Ana Paula Valadão	4:24
Enquanto Eu Viver	Klaus Kuehn & Thomas Miller (version of Ana Paula Valadão)	Ana Paula Valadão & Israel Salazar	3:52
Jesus Amado	Ana Paula Valadão	Ana Paula Valadão, Rodrigo Campos & Saara Campos	5:29
Grande Deus	David Moore (version of Ana Paula Valadão)	Ana Paula Valadão & Guilherme Fares	5:35
Escudo e Proteção	Glen Packiam, Shannon Alford & Sion Alford (version of Ana Paula Valadão)	Israel Salazar, Marine Friesen e Amanda Cariús	5:13
Creio	Ana Paula Valadão	Ana Paula Valadão	7:00
O Vencedor	Walker Beach (version of Ana Paula Valadão	Israel Salazar, Tião Batista, Rodrigo Campos & Guilherme Fares	4:29
Porque Estás Comigo	Ana Paula Valadão	Ana Nóbrega	4:50
Em Tua Presença	Klaus Kuehn (version of Ana Paula Valadão)	Ana Paula Valadão	4:57
Só Um Relance	Ana Paula Valadão	Ana Paula Valadão	5:34
Santo, Santo, Santo (Salvador e Rei)	Reginald Heber, John Bacchus Dykes & Walker Beach (version of Ana Paula Valadão)	Ana Paula Valadão, Thomas Miller, Mariana Valadão & Felippe Valadão	6:05
Casa de Oração	Ana Paula Valadão	Ana Paula Valadão, Ludmila Ferber, Ana Lúcia Câmara & Gilmar Britto	4:24
Vinho Novo	Ana Paula Valadão	Ana Paula Valadão	5:26

=== DVD ===
Song	Worship Leader
Toma o Teu Lugar	Ana Paula Valadão
Canta Minh'alma	Ana Paula Valadão
Enquanto Eu Viver	Ana Paula Valadão & Israel Salazar
Tudo Para Mim	Ana Paula Valadão
Jesus Amado	Ana Paula Valadão, Rodrigo Campos & Saara Campos
Grande Deus	Ana Paula Valadão & Guilherme Fares
Escudo e Proteção	Israel Salazar, Marine Friesen e Amanda Cariús
Creio	Ana Paula Valadão
O Vencedor	Israel Salazar, Tião Batista, Rodrigo Campos & Guilherme Fares
Porque Estás Comigo	Ana Nóbrega
Em Tua Presença	Ana Paula Valadão
Só Um Relance	Ana Paula Valadão
Santo, Santo, Santo (Salvador e Rei)	Ana Paula Valadão, Thomas Miller, Mariana Valadão & Felippe Valadão
Preciso de Ti	Ana Paula Valadão
Casa de Oração	Ana Paula Valadão, Ludmila Ferber, Ana Lúcia Câmara & Gilmar Britto
Vinho Novo	Ana Paula Valadão
