= Marine Friesen =

Brazilian Christian singer and songwriter

- Born: 5 February 1988 (age 38); Rio de Janeiro, Brazil
- Genres: Contemporary Christian music, contemporary worship music, pop rock
- Occupations: Singer, songwriter
- Instruments: Vocals, guitar
- Years active: 2007–present
- Label: Diante do Trono
- Website: marinefriesen.com//

Marine Almeida Friesen (born 5 February 1988) is a Brazilian Christian singer and songwriter.

== Biography ==
Marine Friesen was born in the city of Rio de Janeiro, she converted to Christianity in Sunday school. She studied at CTMDT, being one of the first school classes newly founded at the time. In March 2007, Marine was invited by singer Ana Paula Valadão joined the band Diante do Trono.

She married Daniel Friesen on November 22, 2008, their first child, David Friesen, was born in 2014.

Marine recorded her first album in 2015, the album Alfa & Ômega was recorded live in the Lagoinha Church.

== Discography ==
Solo career

- Alfa & Ômega (2015)
- Alfa & Ômega (New version) (2016)
- Ressuscitou (2017)

as member of Diante do Trono

- Príncipe da Paz - (2007)
- A Canção do Amor - (2008)
- Tua Visão - (2009)
- Aleluia - (2010)
- Sol da Justiça - (2011)
- Glória a Deus - (2012)
- Creio - (2012)
- Global Project Português - (2012)
- Renovo - (2013)
- Tu Reinas - (2014)
- Tetelestai - (2015)
- Deus Reina - (2015)
