= Fernanda Brum =

Brazilian musician, pastor and writer

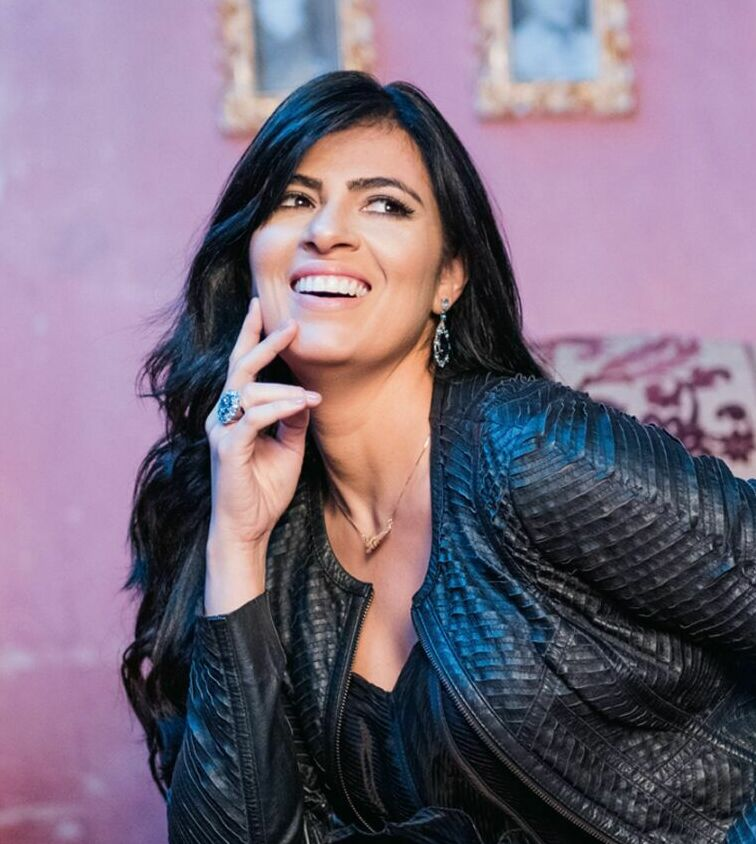
- Fernanda Brum

Background information
- Born: 19 December 1976 (age 49); Rio de Janeiro, RJ, Brazil
- Genres: Contemporary Christian music, contemporary worship music
- Occupations: Singer, songwriter, worship pastor, author
- Instrument: Vocals
- Years active: 1993–present
- Labels: Nancel Produções (1993); MK Music (1995–2020); Sony Music (2020 – atualmente)
- Website: fernandabrum.com.br

Fernanda Brum Costa da Cruz Pinheiro (born 19 December 1976) is a Brazilian Christian singer, songwriter, worship pastor and writer.

== Biography ==
Born in Rio de Janeiro, she grew up in Irajá, a middle-class neighborhood in the north. Fernanda has three siblings, namely: Marcia Brum, Bruno Costa and Louise Costa; Her parents are Nelio Brum (Policial officer) Costa and Maria Fernandes Costa. Since she was a little girl, Fernanda always had contact with the musical world, and as a child Fernanda won a TV contest singing to represent the school in which she studied. Fernanda has done theater course, sang jingles among other things. On 18 May 1996, Fernanda Brum married the singer and pastor Emerson Pinheiro music producer, 26 both pastors of Central Baptist Church in Barra da Tijuca. She participated in the group "Voices" for several years.

She participated in 2011 Festival Promessas, alongside Ana Paula Valadão, the band leader Diante do Trono, Ludmila Ferber and Damares.

In 2015, she was nominated for the 16th Latin Grammy Awards in the Best Christian Album (Portuguese Language) category. She was nominated again for the same award in 2017 with her album Ao Vivo em Israel.

== Discography ==
Solo career

=== Studio albums ===
Title	Details
Feliz de Vez	Released: 1993; Label: Nancel Produções; Format: LP
Meu Bem Maior	Released: 1 December 1995; Label: MK Music; Format: LP, CD
Sonhos	Released: 1997; Label: MK Music; Format: CD
O Que Diz Meu Coração	Released: 15 July 1999; Label: MK Music; Format: CD
Feliz de Vez	Released: 19 July 2001; Label: MK Music; Format: CD, download digital
Quebrantado Coração	Released: 2002; Label: MK Music; Format: CD
Profetizando às Nações	Released: March 2006; Label: MK Music; Format: CD, download digital
Cura-me	Released: 20 March 2008; Label: MK Music; Format: CD, download digital
Glória	Released: 14 June 2010; Label: MK Music; Format: CD, download digital
Liberta-me	Released: 23 August 2012; Label: MK Music; Format: CD, download digital
Som da Minha Vida	Released: 2017; Label: MK Music; Format: CD, download digital
Terceiro Céu	Released: 2019; Label: MK Music; Format: CD, download digital
Águas Profundas	Released: 2020; Label: MK Music; Format: download digital
Do Éden ao Éden	Released: November 2021; Label: Sony Music; Format: download digital
Milagre	Released: 18 March 2025; Label: Sony Music; Format: download digital

=== Live albums ===
Title	Details
Apenas um Toque	Released: March 2004; Label: MK Music; Format: CD, DVD, download digital
Glória in Rio	Released: 25 August 2011; Label: MK Music; Format: CD, DVD, download digital
Da Eternidade	Released: 16 January 2015; Label: MK Music; Format: CD, download digital
Ao Vivo em Israel	Released: 25 October 2016; Label: MK Music; Format: CD, DVD, download digital
Onde o Fogo Não Apaga	Released: 13 April 2023; Label: Sony Music; Format: download digital

=== International ===
Title	Details
Apenas un Toque	Released: May 2007; Label: MK Music; Format: CD
Redención	Released: May 2008; Label: MK Music; Format: CD

=== Collected ===
Title	Details
MK CD Ouro – As 10 Mais de Fernanda Brum	Released: 2005; Label: MK Music; Format: CD
MP3 Collection	Released: 2005; Label: MK Music; Format: CD
O Melhor da Musica Gospel (Edição 02)	Released: 2008; Label: MK Music; Format: CD, download digital
Som Gospel	Released: 2009; Label: MK Music; Format: CD, download digital
Falando de Amor	Released: 2010; Label: MK Music; Format: CD, download digital
Gospel Collection	Released: 2014; Label: MK Music; Format: CD, download digital

=== Live albums ===
Title	Details
Apenas um Toque – O Evento	Released: 2004; Label: MK Music; Format: DVD
Profetizando às Nações – Ao Vivo	Released: 2007; Label: MK Music; Format: DVD
Cura-me – Ao Vivo	Released: December 2009; Label: MK Music; Format: DVD
Glória in Rio	Released: 25 August 2011; Label: MK Music; Format: DVD
Liberta-me	Released: 8 April 2014; Label: MK Music; Format: DVD
Ao Vivo em Israel	Released: 25 October 2016; Label: MK Music; Format: DVD

=== Amigas Project ===
Title	Details
Amigas	Released: January 2008; Label: MK Music; Format: CD, download digital
Amigas 2	Released: November 2009; Label: MK Music; Format: CD, download digital

with Voices

- Colores del Amor (1997)
- Corações Gratos (1999)
- Por Toda Vida (2009)
- Coração de Criança (2001)
- Aliança (2002)
- Acústico (2005)
- Sobreviverei (2007)
- Natal (2008)
- Para Sempre (2012)

== Awards and nominations ==
Troféu Promessas

Year	Category	Recipient	Result
2013	Best CD	Liberta-me	Nominated
2013	Best Clip	Liberta-me	Nominated
2013	Best singer	Herself	Won
2012	Best CD	Glória in Rio	Nominated
2012	Best DVD	Glória in Rio	Nominated
2012	Best music	Canta Minha Alma	Nominated
2012	Best singer	Herself	Won
2011	Best music	Pavão Pavãozinho	Won
2011	Best CD	Glória	Nominated
2011	Best singer	Herself	Nominated

Troféu Talento

Year	Category	Recipient	Result
2009	Duo of the Year	Fernanda Brum e Eyshila	Won
2007	Singer of the Year	Herself	Won
2005	Singer of the Year	Herself	Nominated
2003	Video Clip of the Year	Quebrantado Coração	Nominated
2003	Song of the Year	Quebrantado Coração	Nominated
2003	CD of the Year	Quebrantado Coração	Nominated
2003	Best Re-Recording	Lembranças de Jesus	Won
2003	Singer of the Year	Herself	Won
2002	Best Re-Recording	Feliz de Vez	Nominated
1996	Feminine Revelation	Herself	Won

Latin Grammy Awards

Year	Category	Recipient	Result
2008	Best Christian Music Album in Portuguese Language	Cura-me	Nominated
2015	Best Christian Music Album in Portuguese Language	Da Eternidade	Won
2017	Best Christian Music Album in Portuguese Language	Ao Vivo em Israel	Nominated
2018	Best Christian Music Album in Portuguese Language	Som Da Minha Vida	Won

Troféu de Ouro

Year	Category	Recipient	Result
2015	Best National Album	Da Eternidade	Nominated
2015	Best Song of All Time	Espírito Santo	Nominated
2016	National Singer	Herself	Won
2016	Best Clip	Efésios	Nominated

Troféu Gerando Salvação

Year	Category	Recipient	Result
2016	Addictive Music	O Que Sua Glória Fez Comigo	Nominated
2016	Song of the Year	O Que Sua Glória Fez Comigo	Nominated
2016	Album of the Year	Da Eternidade	Nominated
2016	Singer of the Year	Herself	Nominated
2019	Videoclip	Limpe o Palco, Apague as Luzes	Nominated
2021	Videoclip	Ar	Nominated
2021	Singer of the Year	Herself	Nominated
2022	Videoclip	Escreve	Nominated
2022	Singer of the Year	Herself	Nominated
2024	Singer of the Year	Herself	Nominated
2024	Feat of the year	A Doçura do Teu Falar (with Diante do Trono and Eyshila)	Nominated

Deezer Gospel Day

Year	Category	Recipient	Result
2022	Singer	Herself	Nominated

Troféu Rede Gospel

Year	Category	Recipient	Result
2024	Children's Project	A Alegria do Senhor (with Smilinguido)	Nominated

Restrospectiva Super Gospel

Ano	Category	Recipient	Result
2021	Best Music Video	Escreve	TOP 1

== Bibliography ==
- E Foi Assim... (2013)
- Na Mira... (2023)
- Plena... (2024)
