= Nos Braços do Pai =

Live album by Diante do Trono
- Released: 2002
- Recorded: 13 July 2002
- Venue: Ministries Esplanade, Brasília, Distrito Federal, Brazil
- Genre: Contemporary worship music
- Length: 73:39
- Label: Diante do Trono
- Producer: Diante do Trono

Diante do Trono Live Praise & Worship chronology
Preciso de Ti (2001)	Nos Braços do Pai (2002)	Quero Me Apaixonar (2003)

Nos Braços do Pai is the fifth album in the live praise and worship series of contemporary worship music by Diante do Trono.

== About the project ==
In the pre-recording of the Nos Braços do Pai, the mining group released the Preciso de Ti album, recorded at the Mineirão Stadium, in Belo Horizonte.

In July 2002, the Ministries Esplanade in Brasília, one of the biggest stages ever built in Brazil was erected 78 meters ahead. The event was a record crowd in the national capital: 1,200,000 people. Nos Braços do Pai coincided with Brazil's victory in the World Cup and brasiliense people can contemplate yellow green special lighting placed in the domes of the Senate and Congress especially for the production. People all over the country organized themselves and mobilized caravans to be present in most Christian event ever held in the country's political capital. The CD is part of the development of Brasil Diante do Trono campaign, the first stage was chosen Rio de Janeiro, in Maracanã Stadium.

Talent Trophy in 2003, Nos Braços do Pai won the award for Best CD Praise and Worship, and Ministry was recognized again as Group of the Year.

The album Nos Braços do Pai, was also recorded in English (In the Father's Arms) and Spanish (En los Brazos del Padre), in 2006.

== Track listings ==
=== CD ===
Song	Songwriter	Worship leader	Duration
"Abertura"		Ana Paula Valadão	1:26
"Tua Chuva"	Ana Paula Valadão	Ana Paula Valadão	5:22
"De Todo o Coração"	Ana Paula Valadão	Nívea Soares	6:24
"Invoca-Me"	Ana Paula Valadão	André Valadão	7:45
"Nos Braços do Pai"	Ana Paula Valadão	Ana Paula Valadão	11:20
"Cântico Espontâneo"		Ana Paula Valadão	5:42
"Vem de Ti, Senhor"	Ana Paula Valadão	Ana Paula Valadão, Mariana Valadão	8:17
"No Teu Altar"	Ana Paula Valadão	Ana Paula Valadão, Maximiliano Moraes	6:17
"Amigo"	Ana Paula Valadão	Graziela Santos	7:22
"Brasil"	Ana Paula Valadão	Ana Paula Valadão	6:12
"Eu Sou do Meu Amado"	Ana Paula Valadão	Ana Paula Valadão	7:28

=== DVD ===
Song	Worship leader
"Abertura"	Ana Paula Valadão
"Tua Chuva"	Ana Paula Valadão
"De Todo o Coração"	Nívea Soares
"Pregação"	Ana Paula Valadão
"Invoca-Me"	André Valadão
"Profecia"	André Valadão
"Nos Braços do Pai"	Ana Paula Valadão
"Espontâneo 1"	Ana Paula Valadão
"Vem de Ti, Senhor"	Ana Paula Valadão, Mariana Valadão
"No Teu Altar"	Ana Paula Valadão, Maximiliano Moraes
"Amigo"	Ana Paula Valadão
"Brasil"	Ana Paula Valadão
"Clamor Pelo Brasil"	Ana Paula Valadão
"Espontâneo 2"	Ana Paula Valadão
"Espontâneo 3"	André Valadão
"Eu Sou do Meu Amado"	Ana Paula Valadão
"Convite à Salvação"	Pr. Márcio Valadão
