= Walls (Gateway Worship album) =

Live album by Gateway Worship
- Released: October 2, 2015
- Recorded: May 15, 2015
- Venues: Gateway Church, Southlake, Texas
- Genre: Worship
- Length: 70:20
- Labels: Gateway Create, Fair Trade Services

Gateway Worship chronology
Forever Yours (2012)	Walls (2015)	Acoustic Sessions: Volume One (2018)

Singles from Walls
- 1. "Grace That Won't Let Go" Released: August 28, 2015

Walls (stylized WALLS) is the sixth live album from Gateway Worship. It was released on October 2, 2015.

== Critical reception ==
Professional ratings
Review scores
Source	Rating
CCM Magazine	3/5 stars
The Christian Beat	4/5 stars
Cross Rhythms	7/10 squares
New Release Today	4/5 stars
Worship Leader	4/5 stars

Awarding the album three stars at CCM Magazine, Matt Conner states, "...the set list for Walls is loaded for an album that focuses on tearing down the walls we encounter, both personal and corporate. Walls is, more than anything, an invitation and longing for God’s love and grace to set the listener free". Amanda Furbeck, indicating in a four star review for Worship Leader, says, "Walls exceeds expectations with its impressive roster of talent musicians, fierce energy and themes of God's unchanging love for his people interspersed with the hope of tearing down walls that keep people for a relationship with God and each other."

Signaling in a seven out of ten review at Cross Rhythms, Brendan O'Regan describes, "Producers Walker Beach, Josh Alltop and Miguel Noyola have captured the spirit of live performance but maintained a high quality sound." Mark Ryan, giving the album four star from New Release Today, writes, "The Gateway Worship team has put together a remarkable live worship project that will encourage you in your own worship times, while also providing the church with songs that create an indelible impact on those who sing them." Rating the album four stars by The Christian Beat, Lauren McLean describes, "Each song could be a stand out single in its own right and each track is compelling in its own way."

== Awards and accolades ==
This album was No. 17, on the Worship Leader's Top 20 Albums of 2015 list.

The song, "Grace That Won't Let Go", was No. 16, on the Worship Leader's Top 20 Songs of 2015 list.

== Track listing ==
No.	Title	Writer(s)	Worship Leader	Length
1.	"Higher Than the Sky"	David Eric Moore, Michael Neale	Matt Birkenfeld	3:35
2.	"Love Has Found Us"	Mark Harris, Matthew Harris	Anna Byrd	4:00
3.	"Walls"	Cody Carnes, Jason Walker	Cody Carnes	4:49
4.	"You Stand"	Colin Baker, Mark Harris	Thomas Miller	4:35
5.	"Grace That Won't Let Go"	Thomas Miller, Mark Harris	Mark Harris	3:52
6.	"Let the Heavens Open"	Cody Carnes, Kari Jobe Carnes	Kari Jobe Carnes	8:43
7.	"Undone (We Cry Out)"	Levi Smith, Michael Farren	Thomas Miller	6:52
8.	"You Never Change"	Rita Springer, Mia Fieldes	Rita Springer	5:10
9.	"Found in You"	David Eric Moore	David Moore	5:12
10.	"We Are One"	Josh Alltop, Mark Harris, Michael Farren, Kyle Lee	Matt Birkenfeld	3:16
11.	"Wait for You"	Rebecca Hart, Mark Harris, Michael Farren	Rebecca Hart	3:07
12.	"Whatever You Want"	Josh Alltop, Michael Farren	Cody Carnes	4:25
13.	"We Bow Low"	Tim Sheppard	Tim Sheppard	5:39
14.	"Grace That Won't Let Go" (radio version)	Thomas Miller, Mark Harris	Mark Harris	3:59
15.	"Wait for You" (studio version)	Rebecca Hart, Mark Harris, Michael Farren	Rebecca Hart	3:06
Total length:				70:20

== Chart performance ==
Chart (2015)	Peak position
US Heatseekers Albums (Billboard)	33
US Top Christian Albums (Billboard)	1
