= Quero Me Apaixonar =

Live album by Diante do Trono
- Released: 2003
- Recorded: 12 July 2003, Campo de Marte Airport, São Paulo, São Paulo, Brazil (2,000,000 people present)
- Genre: Contemporary Christian
- Length: 74:02 (CD) and 122:15 (DVD & VHS)
- Label: Diante do Trono
- Producer: Diante do Trono

Diante do Trono Live Praise & Worship chronology
Nos Braços do Pai (2002)	Quero Me Apaixonar (2003)	Esperança (2004)

Quero Me Apaixonar is the sixth album in the live praise and worship series by Brazilian contemporary Christian musician Diante do Trono.

== Background ==
In the pre-recording of the Quero Me Apaixonar, the mining group released the Nos Braços do Pai album, recorded at the Ministries Esplanade, in Brasília. The live recording of the album brought an audience of more than 2 million, according to the military police. Recorded at the Campo de Marte Airport in Santana, São Paulo neighborhood.

The album sold about 800,000 copies in Brazil thus receiving Triple Platinum album, charting successes in churches throughout Brazil including "Eu Nasci de Novo" and "Quero Me Apaixonar" (theme song).

Quero Me Apaixonar garnered multiple 2004 Talent Trophies: Best CD of the Year, Best Live CD and Best Praise and Worship CD, Ana Paula Valadão as Best Female Interpreter and the ministry was recognized again as Group of the Year.

== Track listings ==
=== CD ===
Song	Author	Worship leader	Length
Manancial Remix	Ana Paula Valadão	Ana Paula Valadão	7:11
Com Intensidade	Ana Paula Valadão	Ana Paula Valadão	5:23
Invoco o Senhor	Ana Paula Valadão	Ana Paula Valadão	4:07
Lugares Altos	Ana Paula Valadão	Helena Tannure	5:37
Quero Me Apaixonar	Ana Paula Valadão	Ana Paula Valadão	7:46
Seja o Centro	Ana Paula Valadão	Ana Paula Valadão & Nívea Soares	6:58
Quero Tocar-Te	Ana Paula Valadão	Mariana Valadão	11:51
Tu és o Cordeiro	Ana Paula Valadão	Ana Paula Valadão, Graziela Santos & Soraya F. Gomes	5:02
Eu Nasci de Novo	Ana Paula Valadão	Ana Paula Valadão & André Valadão	14:23
História de Amor	Ana Paula Valadão	Ana Paula Valadão	5:38

=== DVD ===
Song	Worship Leader
Manancial Remix	Ana Paula Valadão
Com Intensidade	Ana Paula Valadão
Invoco o Senhor	Ana Paula Valadão
Espontâneo 1	Ana Paula Valadão
Lugares Altos	Helena Tannure
Clamor Pela Nação	Helena Tannure
Quero Me Apaixonar	Ana Paula Valadão
Seja o Centro	Ana Paula Valadão & Nívea Soares
Quero Tocar-Te	Mariana Valadão
Espontâneo 2	Ana Paula Valadão
Tu és o Cordeiro	Ana Paula Valadão, Graziela Santos & Soraya F. Gomes
Eu Nasci de Novo	Ana Paula Valadão & André Valadão
Espontâneo 3	Ana Paula Valadão & André Valadão
História de Amor	Ana Paula Valadão
Créditos Finais	
