= Preciso de Ti =

Live album by Diante do Trono
- Released: 2001
- Recorded: 14 July 2001
- Venues: Mineirão Stadium, Belo Horizonte, Minas Gerais, Brazil
- Genres: Worship, contemporary Christian
- Length: 73:04
- Label: Diante do Trono
- Producer: Diante do Trono

Diante do Trono Live Praise & Worship chronology
Águas Purificadoras (2000)	Preciso de Ti (2001)	Nos Braços do Pai (2002)

Preciso de Ti is the fourth album in the live praise and worship series of contemporary worship music by Diante do Trono.

== About the project ==
In the pre-recording of the album, the mining group released the Águas Purificadoras album, recorded at the Gameleira Park, in Belo Horizonte.

The Diante do Trono booked the Governor Magalhães Pinto Stadium, Mineirão, to record the fourth album, Preciso de Ti. In July 2001, with a 42-foot stage, 210,000 people attended the event. It was the largest crowd ever recorded in the stadium according to ADEMG (the government agency responsible for administering stages of Minas Gerais). Preciso de Ti also marked the history of Diante do Trono to receive three Indian girls recovered by India Project. Along with the whole group they sang and danced.

On this album all tracks are written by Ana Paula Valadão.

Nowadays, the theme song "Preciso de Ti" is sung throughout Brazil, and even in other countries.

For this CD, Diante do Trono was recognized by Talent Trophy 2002, Grammy gospel music in Brazil, as Group of the Year and the title track of the CD Preciso de Ti won the award for Song of the Year.

According to the ABPD (Brazilian Association of Record Producers), the album Preciso de Ti sold 2 million copies around Brazil, is the best-selling album in the history of Brazilian gospel music, and is the 15th most-sold album in Brazil's history.

Like other tracks on the album, "Deus de Milagres" was written in a moment of sadness in the life of Ana Paula Valadão. Newly married, during the honeymoon, her husband Gustavo Bessa crashed his jet ski. The song is the most re-recorded song on the album according to the ministry of Diante do Trono. Two versions of the song in English, both written by Ana Paula Valadão, but with different lyrics, were created.

== Track listing ==
Song	Songwriter	Worship leader	CD duration
"Quero Subir"	Ana Paula Valadão	Ana Paula Valadão	5:57
"Em Teus Átrios"	Ana Paula Valadão	Ana Paula Valadão	5:59
"Insaciável"	Ana Paula Valadão	Ana Paula Valadão	5:02
"Conhecerei"	Ana Paula Valadão	Ana Paula Valadão	4:39
"Mais do que Tudo"	Ana Paula Valadão	André Valadão	5:07
"Ouve, Senhor"	Ana Paula Valadão	Ana Paula Valadão	4:38
"Deus de Milagres"	Ana Paula Valadão	Ana Paula Valadão	6:34
"Coração Igual ao Teu"	Ana Paula Valadão	Ana Paula Valadão, Maximiliano Moraes	5:08
"Preciso de Ti"	Ana Paula Valadão	Ana Paula Valadão, Helena Tannure e João Lúcio Tannure	15:19
"Leva-me"	Ana Paula Valadão	Ana Paula Valadão, Nívea Soares	7:41
"Em Toda a Terra"	Ana Paula Valadão	Ana Paula Valadão	6:55
