= André Valadão =

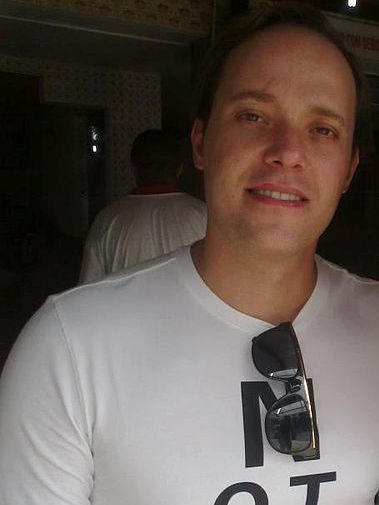
- Valadão in 2012

Background information
- Born: 16 April 1978 (age 48); Belo Horizonte, Minas Gerais, Brazil
- Genres: Contemporary Christian music, contemporary worship music, pop rock
- Occupations: Singer, songwriter, worship pastor
- Instruments: Vocals, piano
- Years active: 1998–present
- Labels: Diante do Trono, Furious? Record, Graça Music, Onimusic, Som Livre
- Formerly of: Diante do Trono
- Website: andrevaladao.com

André Machado Valadão (born 16 April 1978) is a Brazilian Christian singer, songwriter, worship pastor and television presenter.

In December 2022, he became Senior pastor of the Global Lagoinha Church.

== Biography ==
He was part of the successful band Diante do Trono, led by his sister Ana Paula Valadão, starting in 1998. Son of the senior pastor of the Lagoinha Baptist Church, Márcio Valadão, André is married to Cassiane Valadão, with whom he has two children, Lorenzo Valadão and Vitório Valadão. André is brother of singers Ana Paula Valadão and Mariana Valadão. He attended RHEMA Bible Training Center, also the DOMATA School of Missions in Tulsa/Oklahoma and the music seminar Christ For the Nations in Dallas/Texas. In his solo career, which began in 2004, he has released twelve albums, seven with songs of his own. André Valadão has received the Talent Award trophy in different categories and was also twice nominated for a Latin Grammy for album Sobrenatural (2008) and Fé (2009). His album Fé, released in 2009, was the most successful album of André Valadão.

The artist has his own trademark "Fé", used to market clothing, accessories, helmets and cosmetics. The singer has ties to the Uptime (English school) and Claro. In 2017 the pastor leads a branch of Lagoinha Church in Orlando, Florida. In December 2022, he became Senior pastor of the Global Lagoinha Church.

== Discography ==
Solo career

| Title | Details |
|---|---|
| Mais que Abundante | Released: 2004; Label: Diante do Trono; Format: CD, download digital |
| Milagres | Released: 2005; Label: Diante do Trono; Format: CD, download digital |
| Alegria | Released: 2006; Label: Diante do Trono; Format: CD, download digital |
| Clássicos | Released: 2007; Label: Diante do Trono; Format: CD, download digital |
| Sobrenatural | Released: 2008; Label: Diante do Trono; Format: CD, download digital |
| Unidos - Delirious? + André Valadão | Released: 2008; Label: Diante do Trono; Format: CD, download digital |
| Clássicos de Natal | Released: December 2008; Label: Diante do Trono; Format: CD, download digital |
| Fé | Released: 2009; Label: Graça Music; Format: CD, download digital |
| André Valadão Diante do Trono | Released: 2009; Label: Som Livre; Format: CD, download digital |
| Minhas Canções na Voz de André Valadão | Released: 2010; Label: Graça Music; Format: CD, download digital |
| Aliança | Released: 2011; Label: Onimusic; Format: CD, download digital |
| Fortaleza | Released: 20 July 2013; Label: Som Livre; Format: CD, download digital |
| Versões Acústicas | Released: 11 August 2014; Label: Som Livre; Format: CD, download digital |
| Crer para Ver | Released: 4 March 2016; Label: Som Livre; Format: CD, download digital |
| Bossa Worship | Released: 20 January 2017; Label: Som Livre; Format: CD, download digital |
| Versões Acústicas 2 | Released: 28 December 2017; Label: Som Livre; Format: CD, download digital |

Video Albums

| Title | Details |
|---|---|
| Mais que Abundante | Released: 2004; Label: Diante do Trono; Format: CD, download digital |
| Milagres | Released: 2005; Label: Diante do Trono; Format: CD, download digital |
| Alegria | Released: 2006; Label: Diante do Trono; Format: CD, download digital |
| Unidos - Delirious? + André Valadão | Released: 2008; Label: Diante do Trono; Format: CD, download digital |
| Fé | Released: 2009; Label: Graça Music; Format: CD, download digital |
| Aliança | Released: 2011; Label: Onimusic; Format: CD, download digital |
| Fortaleza | Released: 20 July 2013; Label: Som Livre; Format: CD, download digital |
| Crer para Ver | Released: 4 March 2016; Label: Som Livre; Format: CD, download digital |

With Diante do Trono

- Diante do Trono - as member (1998)
- Exaltado - as member (2000)
- Águas Purificadoras - as member (2000)
- Aclame ao Senhor - as member (2000)
- Preciso de Ti - as member (2001)
- Brasil Diante do Trono - as member (2002)
- Nos Braços do Pai - as member (2002)
- Quero Me Apaixonar - as member (2003)
- Esperança - as member (2004)
- Ainda Existe Uma Cruz - as member (2005)
- Por Amor de Ti, Oh Brasil - as member (2006)
- In the Father's Arms - as member (2006)
- En los Brazos del Padre - as member (2006)
- Tempo de Festa - as member (2007)
- Príncipe da Paz - as member (2007)
- Com Intensidade - as member (2008)
- A Canção do Amor - as member (2008)
- Aleluia - as special participant (2010)
- Sol da Justiça - as special participant (2011)
- Glória a Deus - as special participant (2012)
- Global Project: Português - as special participant (2012)
- Tu Reinas - as special participant (2014)
- Tetelestai - as special participant (2015)
- Deus Reina - as special participant (2015)

== Television program ==
- Fé (2012–present)

== Participation in films ==
- Vingança (2013)
