= Juliano Son =

- Born: 11 February 1974 (age 52); São Paulo, São Paulo, Brazil
- Genres: Contemporary Christian music, contemporary worship music, Worship music, Pop, Rock, Pop rock
- Occupations: Singer, songwriter, missionary, worship pastor
- Instruments: Vocals, piano
- Years active: 2005–present
- Label: Onimusic
- Website: www.livresoficial.com

Juliano Son (born 11 February 1974) is a Brazilian Christian singer, songwriter, missionary and worship pastor. He is the leader of the ministry Livres Para Adorar.

== Life and career ==
Juliano Son is descendant of Korean immigrants who came to Brazil. He is married to Daniele Son, with whom he has three sons, Lucas, Filipe and Mateus. He studied theology at the Baptist Theological College of São Paulo. Juliano is a member of the Oriental Missionary Church of São Paulo.

The band Livres Para Adorar was founded in 2005 by Juliano, after receiving a testimony of a missionary who reported on the reality of trafficking and child sex slavery in Nepal. The purpose of the ministry was to promote and financially support a project that helped these children, thus came the ministry Livres who recorded his first CD entitled "Livres Para Adorar". In the same year of the launch of the first album, the ministry Livres Para Adorar founded the shelter "Livre Ser", which welcomes children between 8–17 years in the desert region of Brazil, considered the poorest region of Brazil, the Northeast Sertão. At the end of 2012, Julian moved with his family to the Sertão, on Piauí state to be a missionary.

== Discography ==
Albums with Livres Para Adorar

- Livres Para Adorar (2005)
- A Mensagem (2006)
- Pra Que Outros Possam Viver (2009)
- Pra Que Outros Possam Viver - Ao Vivo (2009)
- Mais Um Dia (2011)
- Mais Um Dia - Ao Vivo (2013)
- Só Em Jesus (2015)
- Ao Vivo em São Paulo (2017)

Singles

- Tudo Novo (2019)
- Tudo Bem (2019)
- Verei (2020)
- Ele É (2020)
