= Sol da Justiça =

Live album by Diante do Trono
- Released: 18 September 2011
- Recorded: 16 and 18 July 2011
- Venue: Beach of Meio and Riachuelo Theater, Natal, Rio Grande do Norte, Brazil
- Genre: Contemporary worship music
- Length: 73:57
- Label: Som Livre
- Producer: Diante do Trono

Diante do Trono Live Praise & Worship chronology
Aleluia (2010)	Sol da Justiça (2011)	Creio (2012)

Sol da Justiça is the fourteenth album in the live praise and worship series of contemporary worship music by Diante do Trono.

== About the project ==
In the pre-recording of the Sol da Justiça, the mining group released Aleluia, recorded at the Cowboy Park Barretos, in Barretos.

The album was recorded in Natal. On the disc, the group manages to bring a new musical influence in his music, being different from Aleluia, its predecessor. The orchestra band was absent in the work.

The work was also responsible for making the group receiving his first Latin Grammy nomination in the category Best Portuguese Language Christian Album in 2012. Also received several nominations Trophy Promises.

On 16 July 2011, with an estimated 120,000 people in Beach of Meio public recording of the album was made. But by heavy rains leading up to that day, the recording was impaired by time. So to solve the problem, two days after the group recorded the album again, but in the Riachuelo Theatre, also in Natal. The recording was attended by Asaph Borba and former members of the group, who participated in a medley singing the older songs the group.

A few days after the release, the group also released an application for smartphones, tablets and iPods.

On 21 September, the Expocristã, the disc had sold over forty thousand copies in Brazil, and had been released two days earlier.

The album has a more pop rock sound, different from previous works. The album also features some international versions.

== Track listing ==
=== CD ===
Song	Songwriter	Worship leader	Length
"Hosana"	Ana Paula Valadão	Ana Paula Valadão	7:53
"Grande"	Ana Paula Valadão	Ana Paula Valadão	6:43
"Quão Grande és Tu"	Stuart Hine	Israel Salazar	4:51
"Eu Canto"	Bethany Stephens	Ana Paula Valadão, Israel Salazar	12:04
"Onde?"	Ana Paula Valadão	Ana Nóbrega	6:21
"Me Ama"	John Mark McMillan	Ana Paula Valadão	14:35
"Em Meio à Tua Glória"	Ana Paula Valadão	Ana Paula Valadão	7:28
"Anseio"	Jonathan Lewis	Roberta Izabel	7:44
"Sol da Justiça"	Ana Paula Valadão	Ana Paula Valadão	6:14

=== DVD ===
Song	Worship leader
"Hosana"	Ana Paula Valadão
"Tempo de Festa"	Ana Paula Valadão
"Medley Pentecostal"	Ana Paula Valadão
"Grande"	Ana Paula Valadão
"Quão Grande és Tu"	Israel Salazar
"A Ti a Honra"	Marine Friesen, Amanda Cariús, Letícia Brandão
"Eu Canto"	Ana Paula Valadão, Israel Salazar
"Meu Coração"	Ana Paula Valadão
"Tua Paz"	Ana Paula Valadão, Israel Salazar, Ana Nóbrega
"Onde?"	Ana Nóbrega
"Me Ama"	Ana Paula Valadão
"Em Meio à Tua Glória"	Ana Paula Valadão
"Anseio"	Roberta Izabel
"Um"	Ana Paula Valadão, Asaph Borba
"Medley Asaph Borba"	—
"Sol da Justiça"	Ana Paula Valadão
