= Ludmila Ferber =

Brazilian musical artist (1965–2022)

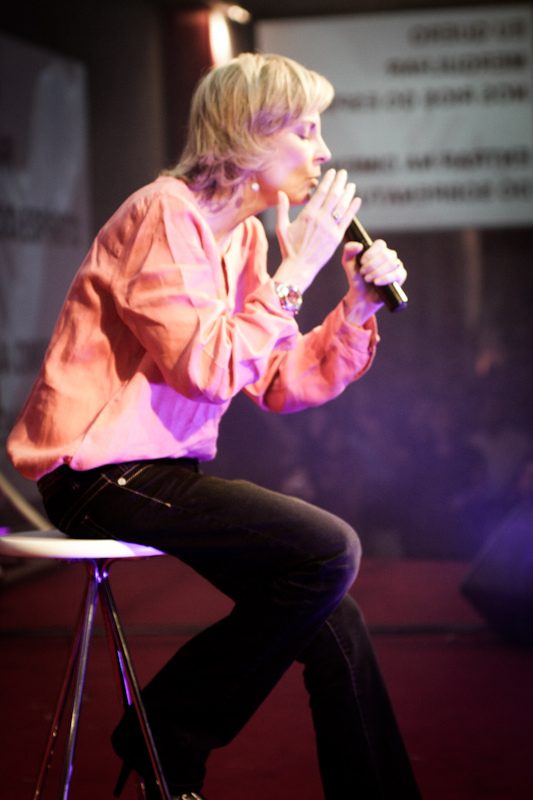
- Ferber in 2012

Background information
- Born: 8 August 1965; Rio de Janeiro, RJ, Brazil
- Died: 26 January 2022 (aged 56)
- Genres: Contemporary Christian music, contemporary worship music, pop rock
- Occupations: Singer, songwriter, worship pastor, author
- Instruments: Vocals, guitar
- Years active: 1996–2022
- Labels: MK Publicitá, Kairós Music, Som Livre, Sony Music
- Website: ludmilaferber.com.br

Ludmila Múrias Ferber Lino (8 August 1965 – 26 January 2022) was a Brazilian Christian singer, songwriter, worship pastor and writer.

== Life and career ==
The singer was the descendant of Russian Jews, Spanish and Portuguese. She became evangelical after her father was cured of cancer. In 1987, Ferber married José Antônio Lino. They had three daughters: Ana Lídia, Vanessa and Daniela.

In 1996, Ferber released her first solo CD, entitled Marcas, which launched her career as a gospel singer. Her music became increasingly popular, and she was soon consolidated as one of the most prestigious names in Brazilian gospel.

She died on 26 January 2022, at the age of 56.

== Discography ==
Studio albums

- Marcas (1996)
- O Verdadeiro Amor (1998)
- Deus é Bom Demais (1999)
- O Coração de quem Adora (2000)
- O Segredo de ser Feliz (2002)
- Ouço Deus me Chamar (2003)
- 24 Horas por Dia (2005)
- Ainda é Tempo (2006)
- Cantarei para Sempre (2008)
- A Esperança Vive (2009)
- Pra Me Alegrar (2013)
- Um Novo Começo (2019)

Live albums

- Os Sonhos de Deus (2001)
- Unção sem Limites (2002)
- Tempo de Cura (2004)
- Uma História, Uma Estrada, Uma Vida (2004)
- Nunca Pare de Lutar (2005)
- Coragem (2007)
- Pérolas da Adoração (2007)
- O Poder da Aliança (2011)

Compilations

- Melodias Inesquecíveis (2007)
- Canções Inesquecíveis (2010)

Kids

- Meu Amigão do Peito (2005)

Singles

- Um Novo Começo (2019)
- O Caminho do Milagre (2019)

== Books ==
- Nunca Pare de Lutar (2012)
