= Israel Salazar (singer) =

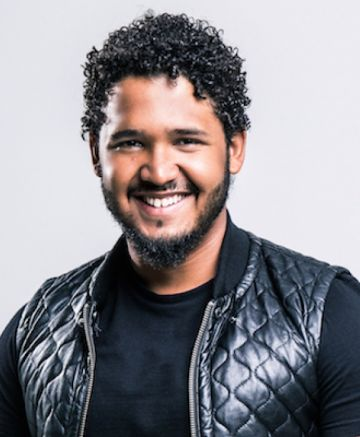

Background information
- Born: 11 June 1990 (age 36); Rio de Janeiro, Rio de Janeiro, Brazil
- Genres: Contemporary worship music
- Occupations: Singer, songwriter
- Instruments: Vocals; guitar; piano; drum
- Years active: 2009–present
- Labels: Som Livre; Diante do Trono; Onimusic; Universal
- Formerly of: Diante do Trono

Israel Salazar de Luna Freire (born 11 June 1990) is a Brazilian contemporary worship music singer and songwriter.

== Biography ==
Salazar was born in Rio de Janeiro. Through adolescence in a religious middle Salazar found himself heavily involved with music, and from a local band. Freire became a student of CTMDT, and became a member of Diante do Trono. His first recording was 2009's Tua Visão. Freire gained prominence as the lead singer. In February 2013, Salazar served as arranger and one of the major composers of the album Nada Temerei, Ana Nóbrega, released by Som Livre label.

== Discography ==
Studio albums

- Jesus (2015)

Live albums

- Avante (2017)

Singles

- "É Natal" (2015)
- "Deus Conosco" (2015)
- "Tua Igreja Canta" (2017)
- "Fé Inabalável" (2019)
- "Move o Sobrenatural" (2019)
