= Nívea Soares =

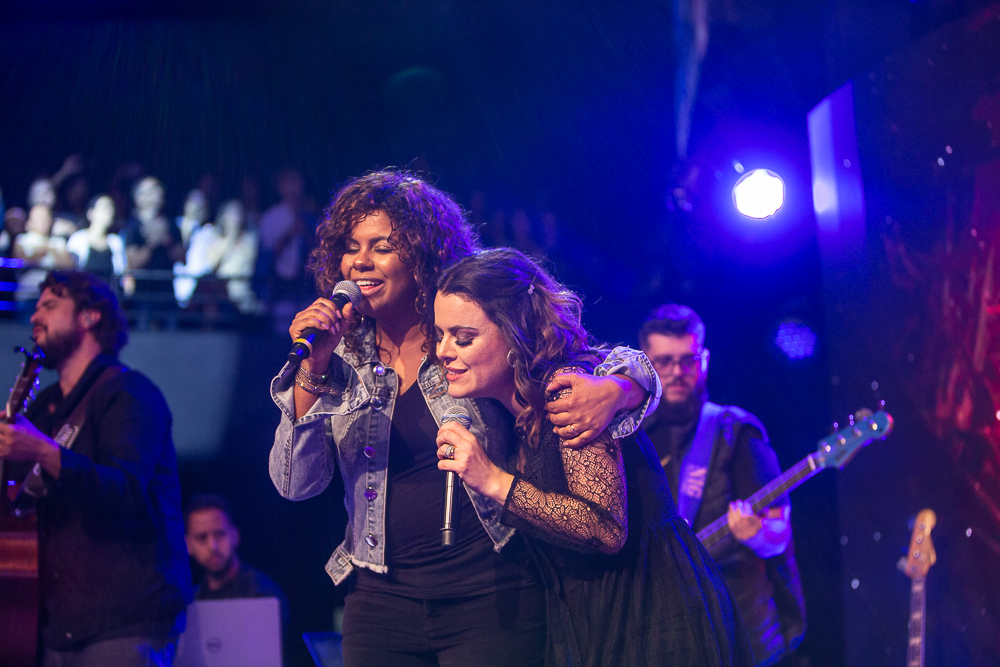
- Nívea Soares and her main musical reference, Ana Paula Valadão.

Background information
- Born: 25 July 1976 (age 50); Belo Horizonte, Minas Gerais, Brazil
- Genres: Contemporary Christian music, contemporary worship music
- Occupations: Singer, songwriter, worship pastor, author, television presenter
- Instrument: Vocals
- Years active: 1997–present
- Labels: Diante do Trono, Aliança, Onimusic
- Website: niveasoares.com

Nívea da Costa Pinto Soares (born 25 July 1976) is a Brazilian Christian singer, songwriter, worship pastor, writer and television presenter.

== Biography ==
Nívea Soares was born in a Christian home, and since childhood has always been involved with music. She has four brothers and is the youngest of her family.

Nívea is a member of the Lagoinha Baptist Church, in 1998 began singing in worship ministry Diante do Trono, led by singer Ana Paula Valadão.

Her first solo album was "Reina Sobre Mim" recorded in 2003.

In 2012 she released the CD and DVD Glória e Honra. The album is considered her most successful work, with several nationally known songs. The song "Em Tua Presença", became the highlight of the album and has millions of views on YouTube.

== Discography ==
Albums

- Reina Sobre Mim (2003)
- Enche-me de Ti (2005)
- Fan the Fire (2006)
- Rio (2007)
- Acústico (2009)
- Emanuel (2010)
- Glória e Honra (2012)
- Canção da Eternidade (with Antônio Cirilo and David Quinlan) (2014)
- Reino de Justiça (2016)
- Jesus (2019)

Collects

- Diante do Trono (2009)
- 10 Anos (2013)

== Singles ==
- Deus Vivo (2016)
- Ousado Amor (2018)
- Jesus (2019)
- Rocha Eterna (2019)
- Reina o Senhor (2019)
- Grande é o Senhor (2019)
- Pai de Amor (2019)
- Eu Me Prostro (2019)
- Venceu (2019)
- Há Um Rio (2019)

== Television program ==
- Lugar Secreto (2013–present)

== Bibliography ==
- Os Improváveis de Deus (2016)
- O Pedido Final (2019)
