= Ana Nóbrega =

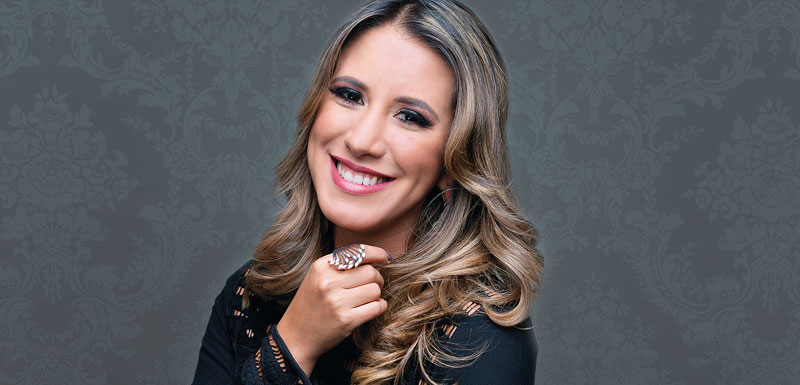

Background information
- Born: 17 July 1980 (age 46); Fortaleza, Ceará, Brazil
- Genres: Contemporary Christian music, contemporary worship music, pop rock
- Occupations: Singer, songwriter
- Instruments: Vocals, piano
- Years active: 2007–present
- Labels: Som Livre, Onimusic
- Website: ananobrega.com.br

Ana Paula de Araújo Aderaldo Nóbrega (born 17 July 1980) is a Brazilian Christian singer and songwriter.

== Biography ==
Ana Nóbrega has been influenced by music since her early childhood. She converted at the age of twelve to Christianity.

Ana is a member of the Lagoinha Baptist Church, and she began singing in 2009, in the worship ministry Diante do Trono, led by singer Ana Paula Valadão.

Her first solo album was "Jesus, me Rendo a Ti," which was recorded in 2007.

== Discography ==
Studio albums

- Jesus, me Rendo a Ti (2007)
- Nada Temerei (2013)
- Perfeito Amor (2017)
- Acústico (2017)

Live albums

- Não Me Deixes Desistir (2015)
