= Latin Grammy Award for Best Christian Album (Portuguese Language) =

- Awarded for: Christian Album (Portuguese Language) containing at least 51% of newly recorded material
- Country: United States
- Presented by: The Latin Recording Academy
- First award: 2002
- Currently held by: Eli Soares for Memóri4s (Ao Vivo) (2025)
- Website: latingrammy.com

The Latin Grammy Award for Best Christian Album (Portuguese Language) is given every year since the 5th Latin Grammy Awards ceremony, which took place at the Shrine Auditorium in Los Angeles. The award goes to solo artists, duos, or groups for releasing vocal or instrumental Portuguese Christian albums containing at least 51% of new recordings.

In 2002 and 2003 the category was named Best Christian Album and rewarded the Christian albums in Spanish and Portuguese. In 2004, the category was split into two depending on the language, with Spanish language releases being awarded in the Best Christian Album (Spanish Language) category ever since.

Brazilian singer Aline Barros holds the record of most wins in the category with eight, followed by Soraya Moraes and Fernanda Brum with two wins each.

== Winners and nominees ==
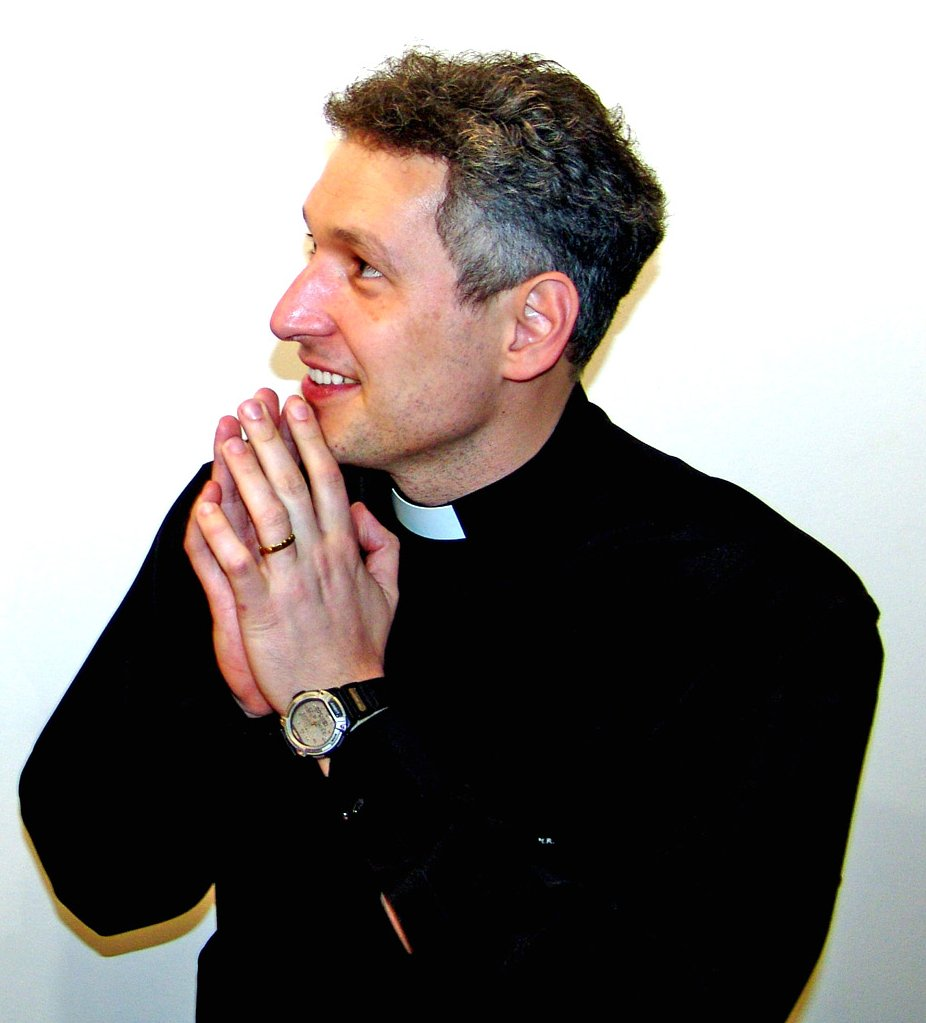
Brazilian musician Marcelo Rossi was the first winner of this category in 2000 when there was only one category for Christian albums that included both Spanish and Portuguese.

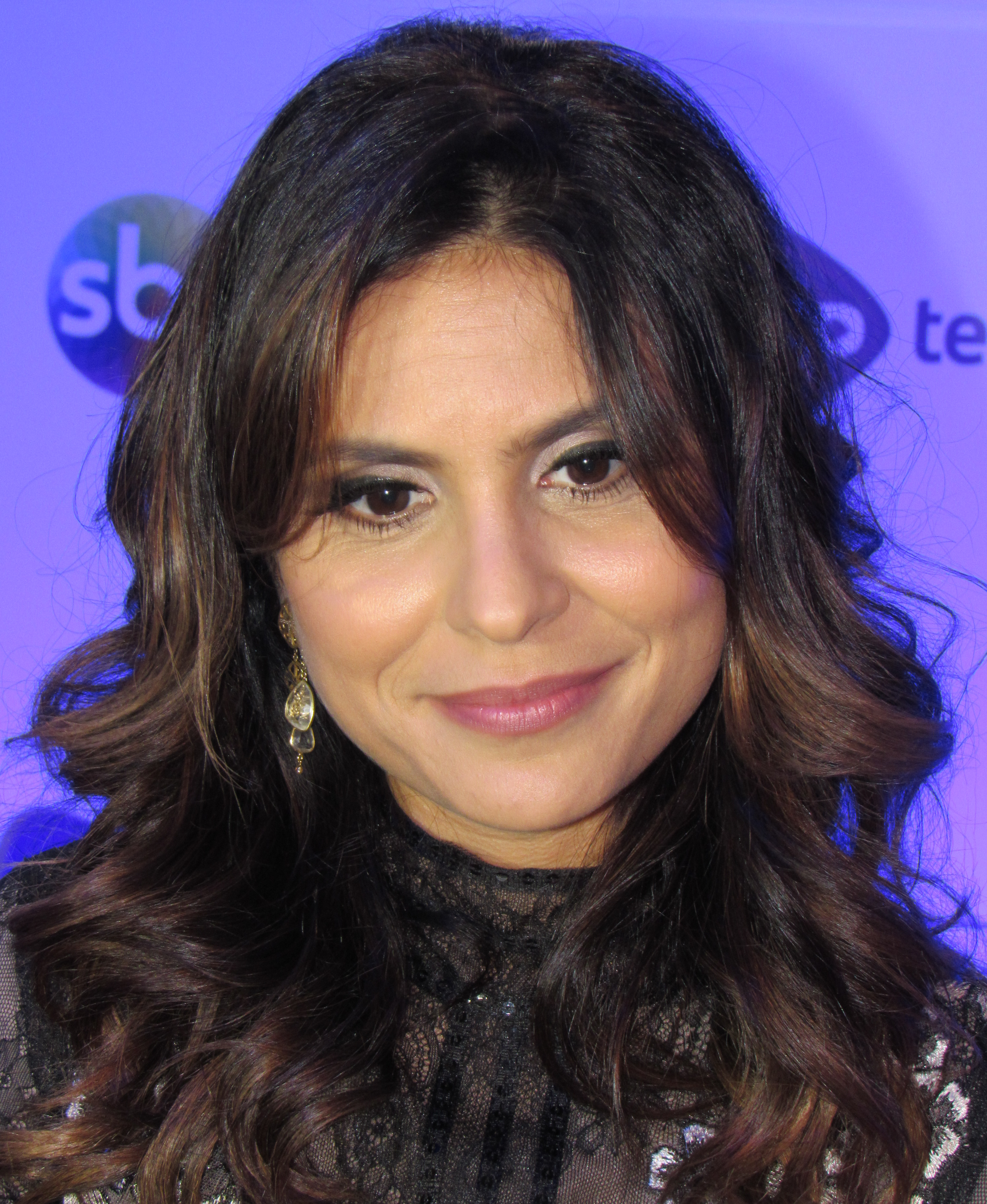
Aline Barros holds the record of most wins in the category with eight wins, in 2004, 2006, 2007, 2011, 2012, 2014, 2017 and 2020.

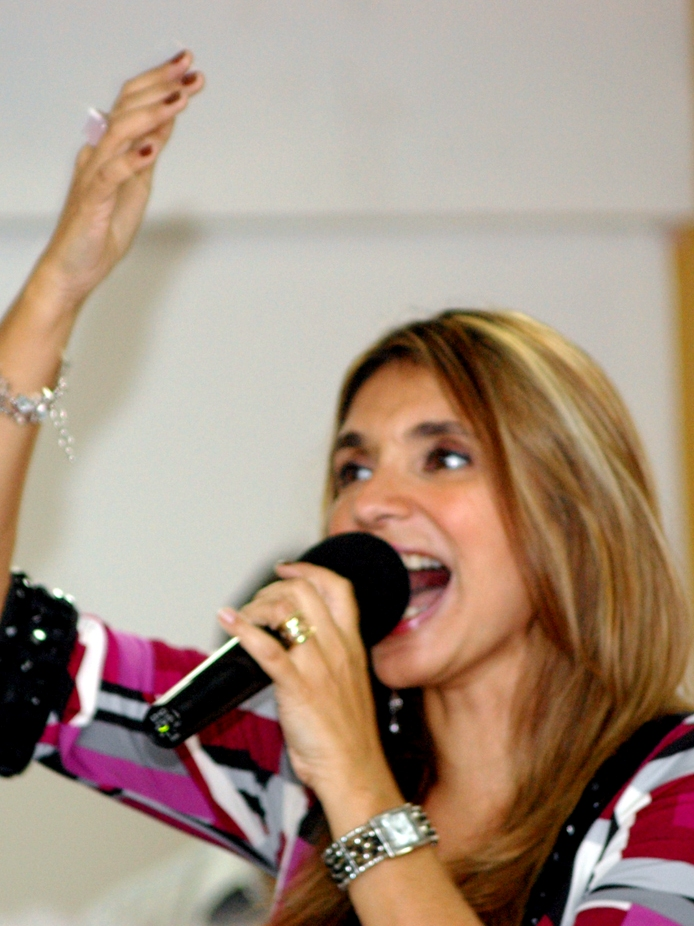
Soraya Moraes has won twice, in 2005 and 2008.

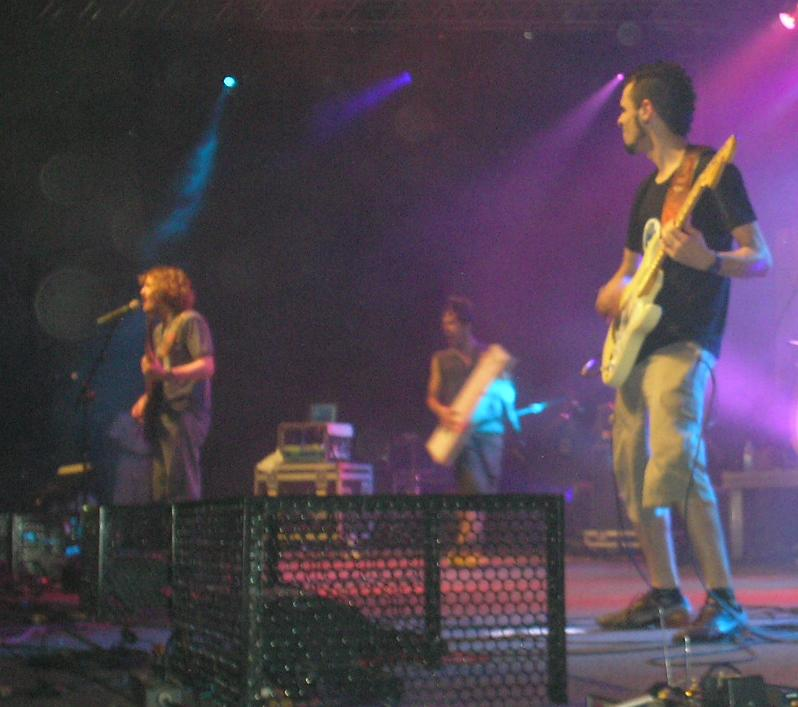
2009 winner Oficina G3.

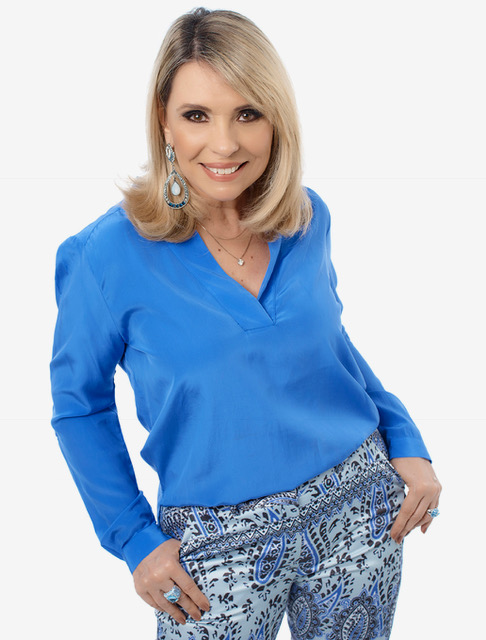
2010 winner Marina de Oliveira.

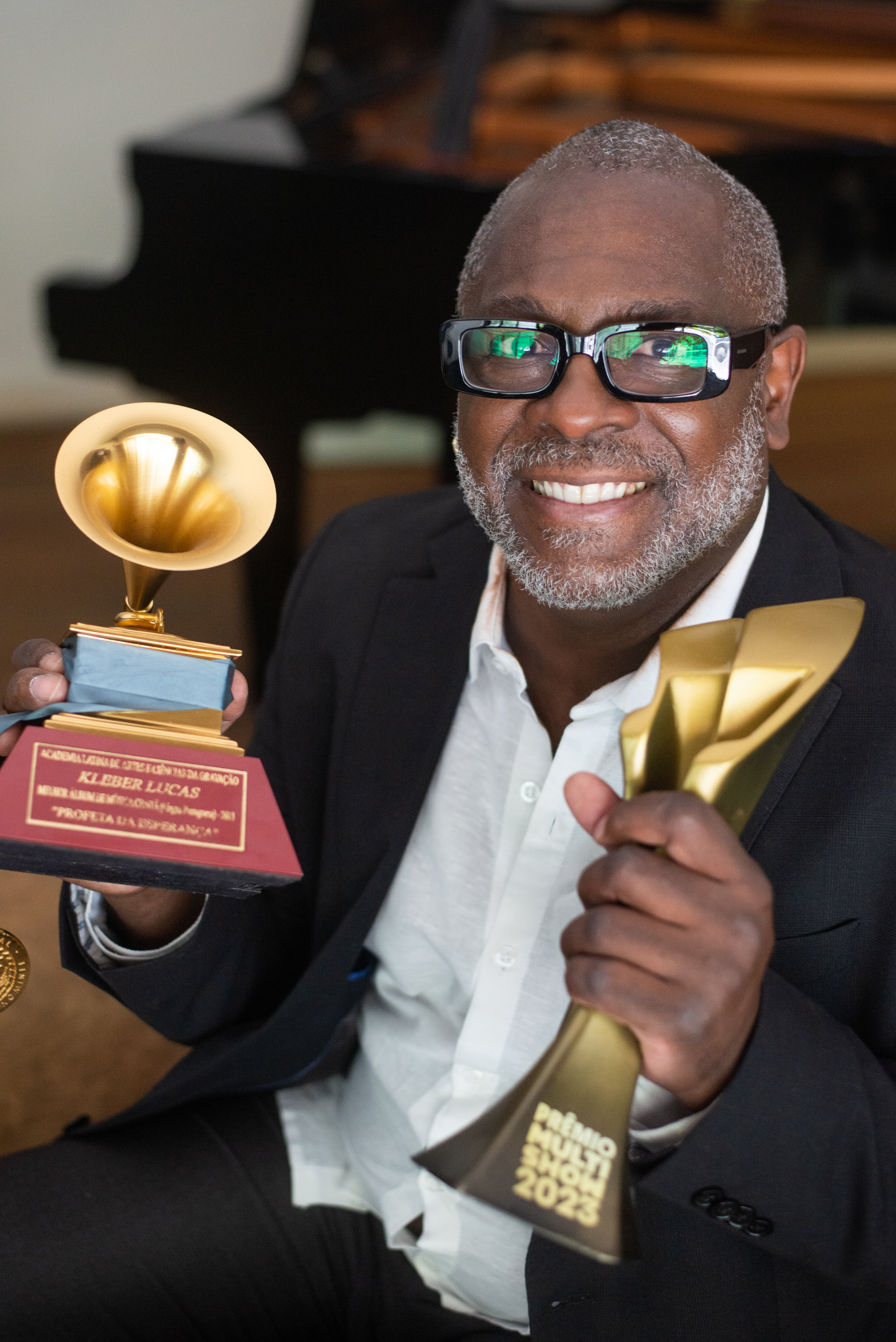
2013 winner Kleber Lucas.

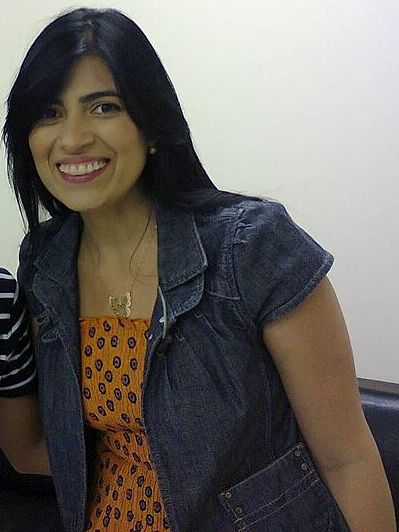
Two-time winner Fernanda Brum.

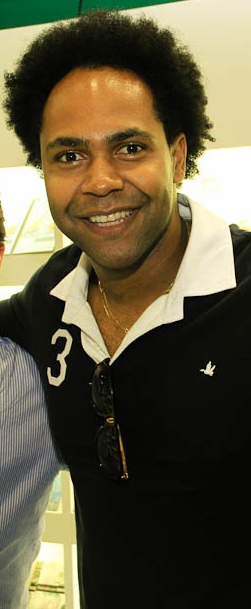
2024 winner Thalles Roberto.

=== Best Christian Album ===
Year	Performing artist(s)	Work	Nominees	Ref.
2002	Padre Marcelo Rossi	Paz - Ao Vivo	Ileana Garcés – El Amor Tiene Un Valor; Roberto Orellana – Mi Nuevo Amor; Rabito – Viva La Vida; 33 DC – Ven, Es Tiempo de Adorarle	
2003	Marcos Witt	Sana Nuestra Tierra	Patty Cabrera – Amar A Alguien Como Yo; Funky – Funkytown; Annette Moreno & Jardín – Un Ángel Llora; Perucho – Almas Unidas	

=== Best Christian Album (Portuguese Language) ===
Year	Performing artist(s)	Work	Nominees	Ref.
2004	Aline Barros	Fruto de Amor	Teus Igreja Batista and Nova Jerusalém – Discípulos; Fernanda Lara and Giordani Vidal – Livre Para Amar; Padre Marcelo Rossi – Maria Mãe Do Filho de Deus (Trilha Sonora Original do Filme); Thalles Roberto – Acústico Gospel	
2005	Soraya Moraes	Deixa O Teu Rio Me Levar - Ao Vivo	Aline Barros – Som De Adoradores - Ao Vivo; Eyshila – Terremoto - Ao Vivo; Ludmila Ferber – Para Orar e Adorar 3 - Ouço Deus Me Chamar; Rose Nascimento – Para O Mundo Ouvir; Oficina G3 – Além do que os Olhos Podem Ver; Alexandre Soul – Cantando, Dançando e Louvando!	
2006	Aline Barros	Aline Barros y Cia	Mara Maravilha – Jóia Rara; Cristina Mel – As Canções da Minha Vida 15 Anos - Ao Vivo; Soraya Moraes – Promessas; Robson Nascimento – Tudo O Que Sou	
2007	Aline Barros	Caminho De Milagres	Padre Juarez de Castro – Deus Está Aqui; Eyshila – Até Tocar O Céu; Cristina Mel – Um Novo Tempo; Robinson Monteiro – Uma Nova História; Oficina G3 – Oficina Elektracustika G3	
2008	Soraya Moraes	Som Da Chuva	Aline Barros – Aline Barros & CIA 2; Fernanda Brum – Cura-Me; Toque No Altar – E Impossivel Mas Deus Pode; André Valadão – Sobrenatural; Italo Villar – Deus Sonha Com Vocé	
2009	Oficina G3	Depois da Guerra	Regis Danese – Compromisso; Marina de Oliveira – Eu Não Vou Parar; Jozyanne – Eu Tenho A Promessa; André Valadão – Fé	
2010	Marina de Oliveira	Na Extremidade	Paulo César Baruk – Multiforme; Bruna Karla – Advogado Fiel; Kleber Lucas – Meu Alvo; Soraya Moraes – Grande É O Meu Deus; Rosa de Saron – Horizonte Distante; Padre Zezinho – Ao País dos Meus Sonhos	
2011	Aline Barros	Extraordinário Amor de Deus	Ministério Adoração e Vida – Em Santidade; Rosa de Saron – Horizonte Vivo Distante; Various Artists; Verônica Firmino (producer) – Uma História em Canções; Padre Zezinho – Quando Deus Se Calou	
2012	Aline Barros	Aline Barros & Cia 3	Diante do Trono – Sol da Justiça; Paulo César Baruk – Eletro Acústico 3; Grupo Chamas – Inquieto Coração; Cantores de Deus – Mulheres Ao Vivo	
2013	Kleber Lucas	Profeta Da Esperança	Eyshila – Jesus, O Brasil Te Adora; Anderson Freire – Raridade; Bruna Karla – Aceito O Teu Chamado; Padre Reginaldo Manzotti – Paz e Luz; Ministério Adoração e Vida – Herói	
2014	Aline Barros	Graça	Anderson Freire – Anderson Freire E Amigos; Jotta A – Geração De Jesus; Soraya Moraes – Céu Na Terra; Renascer Praise – Renascer Praise 18 - Canto De Sião	
2015	Fernanda Brum	Da Eternidade	Anderson Freire – Ao Vivo; Jane Gomes – Posso Tudo Nele; Bruna Karla – Como Águia; Wilian Nascimento – Não Vou Desistir	
2016	Anderson Freire	Deus Não Te Rejeita	Paulo César Baruk – Graça Quase Acústico; Ceremonya – A Vida Num Segundo; Padre Fabio de Melo – Deus No Esconderijo Do Verso; Adelso Freire – Reaprender	
2017	Aline Barros	Acenda A Sua Luz	Paulo César Baruk and Leandro Rodrigues – Piano e Voz, Amigos e Pertences 2; Fernanda Brum – Ao Vivo Em Israel; Padre Fábio de Melo – Clareou; Bruna Karla – Incomparável; Eli Soares – Memórias	
2018	Fernanda Brum	Som Da Minha Vida	Cassiane – Nivél Do Céu; Anderson Freire – Contagem Regressiva; Pr. Lucas – Pintor Do Mundo; Léa Mendonça – Adoração Na Guerra Ao Vivo	
2019	Delino Marçal	Guarda Meu Coração	Priscilla Alcântara – Gente; Adriana Arydes – Sagrado; Preto No Branco – Preto No Branco 3; Eli Soares – 360º	
2020	Aline Barros	Reino	Daniela Araújo – Catarse: Lado A; Ministério Mergulhar – Profundo; Padre Marcelo Rossi – Maria Passa À Frente; Eli Soares – Memórias II (Ao Vivo em Belo Horizonte/2019)	
2021	Anderson Freire	Seguir Teu Coração	Daniela Araújo – Catarse: Lado B; Sarah Farias – Sarah Farias (Ao Vivo); Leonardo Gonçalves – Sentido; Eli Soares – Eli Soares 10 Anos	
2022	Eli Soares	Laboratório do Groove	Asaph – Antes da Terapia –; Antonio Cirilo – O Samba e o Amor; Clovis – Epifania; Bruna Karla – És Tudo	
2023	Eli Soares	Nós	Aline Barros – 30 Anos Vol 1; Casa Worship – Novo Tempo; Fernandinho – Único; Preto No Branco – Preto No Branco Vertical	
2024	Thalles Roberto	Deixa Vir - Vol II (Ao Vivo)	Bruna Karla – Ele É Jesus - Ao Vivo; Rosa de Saron – In Concert (Ao Vivo); Eli Soares – Vida (Ao Vivo); Vocal Livre – Temporal	
2025	Eli Soares	Memóri4s (Ao Vivo)	Ton Carfi – Ton Carfi 20 Anos (Ao Vivo); Paloma Possi – Razão Da Esperança; Resgate – Onde Guardamos As Flores?; Julliany Souza – A Maior Honra	
