= Iahweh =

Brazilian christian rock & metal band

- Origin: Taubaté, São Paulo, Brazil
- Genres: Christian rock; Christian metal; CCLM
- Years active: 1993–2000; 2001–2015
- Labels: Codimuc
- Members: André Leite (vocals); Toninho de Marco (guitar); Tiago Mattos (guitar); Alessandro Bittencourt (bass); Eloy Casagrande (drums)
- Past members: Neli Sestari; Júlio César
- Website: www.iahweh.com.br

Iahweh was a Brazilian Catholic rock/metal band, originating in São Paulo, Brazil.

== Biography ==
The band was founded in São Paulo and released its Alfa e Ômega album, in 1996. Due to internal problems, the band went into hiatus, but returned in 2008 to release the album Neblim, which included the tracks "Misericórdia, Senhor" and "Ruah".

In 2009, the group won the first Louvemos ao Senhor Trophy in the Best Rock Album category. In 2010, the band released their first music video for the orchestrated version of their song "Neblim".

In 2012, Iahweh's lead singer André Leite left the band to join the Rio De Janeiro-based group Hangar.

On March 5, 2014, coinciding with the carnival on Ash Wednesday, Iahweh released a new clip with the participation of Father Fábio de Melo entitled "Deserto," which was also the name of their third CD released later in the same month.

== Members ==
- André Leite – vocals
- Toninho de Marco – guitar
- Alessandro Bittencourt – bass
- Tiago Mattos – guitar
- Eloy Casagrande – drums

=== Past members ===
- Neli Sestari
- Júlio César

== Discography ==
- 1996 – Alfa e Ômega
- 2008 – Neblim
- 2014 – Deserto

== Videography ==
=== Videos ===
- 2010 – "Neblim"
- 2014 – "Deserto"

== Awards ==
Year	Album	Category	Result
2009	Neblim	I Louvemos o Senhor Trophy: Category 12: Best Rock Album	Won

== See also ==
- Rosa de Saron
