= Arena Pernambuco =

Stadium in São Lourenço da Mata, Brazil

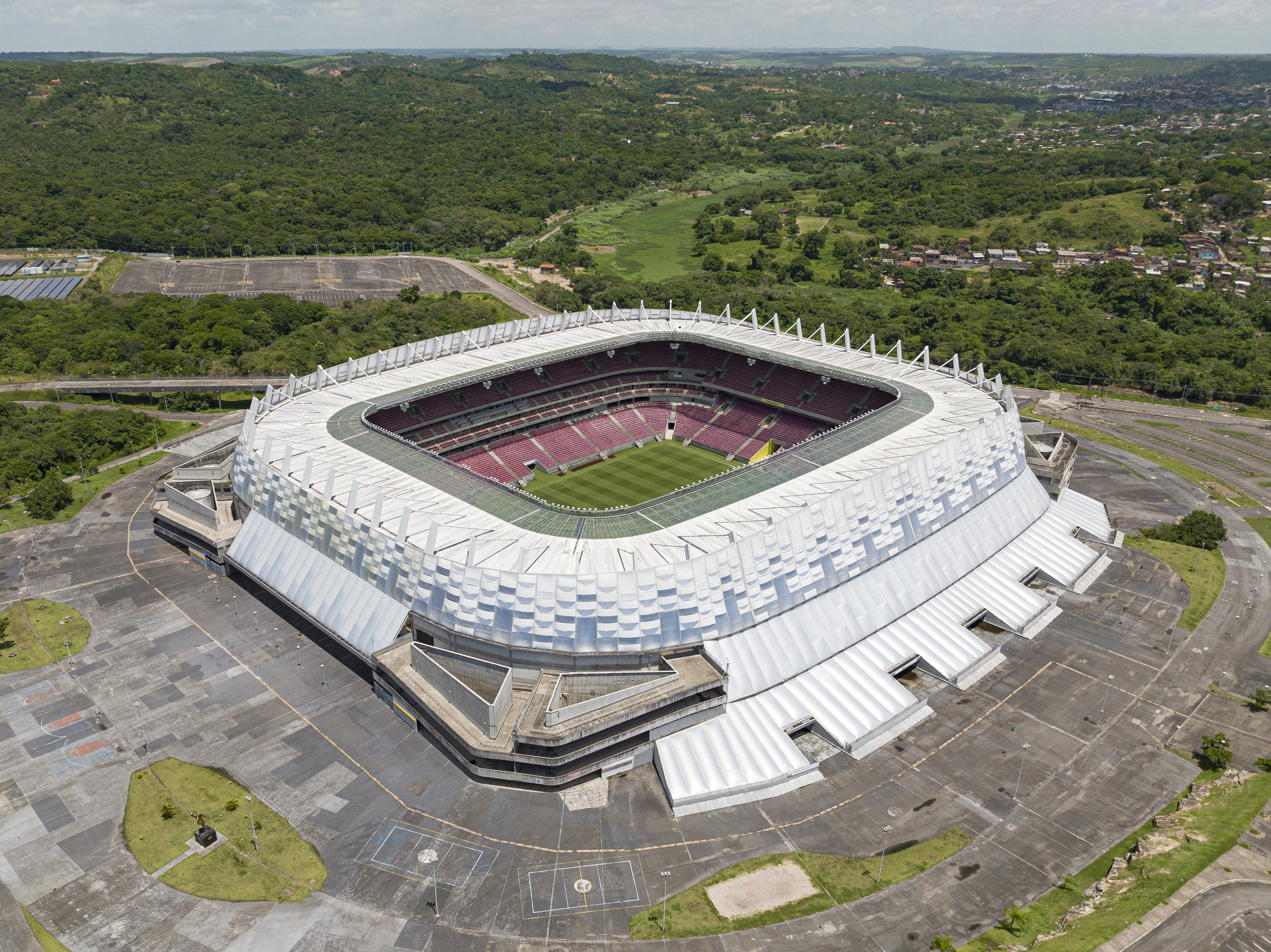
- Sisbrace
- Interactive map of Arena Pernambuco
- Location: São Lourenço da Mata, Pernambuco, Brazil
- Coordinates: 08°02′26″S 35°00′30″W
- Capacity: 45,440
- Field size: 105 x 68 m

Construction
- Built: October 2010 to April 2013
- Opened: 22 May 2013
- Cost: R$ 500 million US$ 226 million EU€ 166 million

Tenants
- Náutico (2013–2018); Brazil national football team (selected matches)

Arena Pernambuco (Portuguese: Arena de Pernambuco), officially named Estádio Governador Carlos Wilson Campos, is a multi-use stadium with a capacity of 45,440 spectators located in the western suburbs of the Recife metropolitan area, in São Lourenço da Mata, Brazil. It is mostly used for football matches and was notably used to host some matches during the 2014 FIFA World Cup.

In 2012 Clube Náutico Capibaribe, one of three professional football clubs in the Recife metro area, signed an agreement to become part owners of the new stadium. In July 2013, Clube Náutico Capibaribe started to play all of their home games at Itaipava Arena Pernambuco. The stadium was previously known as Itaipava Arena Pernambuco under a sponsorship arrangement with brewing company Grupo Petrópolis between 2013 and 2016.

== History ==
Construction of the new stadium was carried out by Odebrecht Infraestrutura and is being completed in various stages. When fully finished the area around Arena Pernambuco will include a university campus, indoor arena, hotel and convention center, plus commercial, business and residential units and a large entertainment complex with shopping centers, cinemas, bars and restaurants.

A "Green" arena: Odebrecht Energia, in partnership with Neoenergia, is implementing a solar power plant in Pernambuco Arena. With an investment of about $13 million, the solar plant will generate 1 MW of installed capacity and is part of a program of research and development of solar power in the country. When not filling the stadium, the energy generated by the plant will be able to meet the average consumption of 6,000 people.

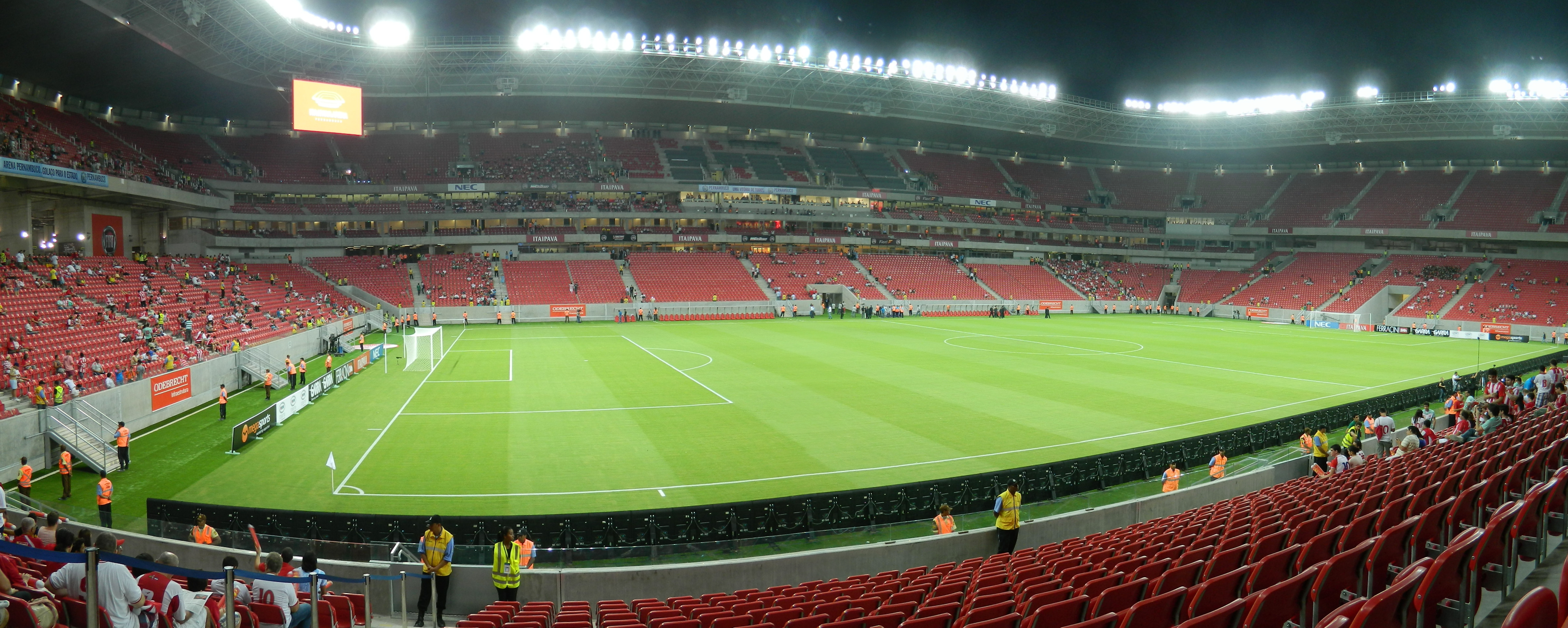
Panorama stadium in interior

== 2013 FIFA Confederations Cup ==
| Date | Time (UTC-03) | Team #1 | Result | Team #2 | Round | Attendance |
|---|---|---|---|---|---|---|
| 16 June 2013 | 19:00 | Spain | 2–1 | Uruguay | Group B | 41,705 |
| 19 June 2013 | 19:00 | Italy | 4–3 | Japan | Group A | 40,489 |
| 23 June 2013 | 16:00 | Uruguay | 8–0 | Tahiti | Group B | 22,047 |

== 2014 FIFA World Cup ==
| Date | Time (UTC-03) | Team #1 | Result | Team #2 | Round | Attendance |
|---|---|---|---|---|---|---|
| 14 June 2014 | 22:00 | Ivory Coast | 2–1 | Japan | Group C | 40,267 |
| 20 June 2014 | 13:00 | Italy | 0–1 | Costa Rica | Group D | 40,285 |
| 23 June 2014 | 17:00 | Croatia | 1–3 | Mexico | Group A | 41,212 |
| 26 June 2014 | 13:00 | United States | 0–1 | Germany | Group G | 41,876 |
| 29 June 2014 | 17:00 | Costa Rica | 1–1 (a.e.t.) (5–3 (p)) | Greece | Round of 16 | 41,242 |

== 2027 FIFA Women's World Cup ==
| Date | Time (UTC-03) | Team #1 | Result | Team #2 | Round | Attendance |
|---|---|---|---|---|---|---|
| 27 June 2027 | --:-- | E1 | v | E2 | Group E | |
| 29 June 2027 | --:-- | A1 | v | A3 | Group A | |
| 1 July 2027 | --:-- | D1 | v | D3 | Group D | |
| 3 July 2027 | --:-- | G1 | v | G3 | Group G | |
| 5 July 2027 | --:-- | B3 | v | B2 | Group B | |
| 7 July 2027 | --:-- | E3 | v | E2 | Group E | |
| 10 July 2027 | --:-- | Winner Group C | v | Runner-up Group D | Round of 16 | |

== Brazil national football team ==
| Date | Time (UTC-03) | Team #1 | Res. | Team #2 | Round | Attendance |
|---|---|---|---|---|---|---|
| 25 March 2016 | 21:45 | Brazil | 2–2 | Uruguay | 2018 FIFA World Cup qualification | 45,020 |
| 9 September 2021 | 21:30 | Brazil | 2–0 | Peru | 2022 FIFA World Cup qualification | 0 |

== Concerts ==
| Band/Artist | Tour | Attendance | Year | Date |
|---|---|---|---|---|
| Claudia Leitte, Saulo Fernandes, Wesley Safadão, Anitta and others | Maior Show do Mundo | N/A | 2013 | August, 3 |
| Fábio de Melo, Padre Reginaldo Manzotti and others | Show dos 25 anos da Comunidade Obra de Maria | ≅ 30,000 | 2015 | January, 11 |
| Padre Reginaldo Manzotti, Padre Damião Silva, Padre João Carlos, Eliana Ribeiro and others | Show dos 26 anos da Comunidade Obra de Maria | ≅ 25,000 | 2016 | October, 23 |
| Larissa Manoela, João Guilherme and Belli e Sua Turma | Play Music Festival | N/A | 2016 | November, 19 |
| Padre Reginaldo Manzotti, Padre Antônio Maria, Padre Marcelo Rossi, Padre João Carlos and others | Show dos 27 anos da Comunidade Obra de Maria | N/A | 2017 | October, 1 |
| Pastor Ailton José Alves and others | Abertura do Centenário da Assembleia de Deus em Pernambuco | 53,635 | 2017 | October, 21 |
| Pastor Ailton José Alves and others | Centenário da Assembleia de Deus em Pernambuco | 56,000 | 2018 | October, 20 |
| Padre Reginaldo Manzotti, Padre Marcelo Rossi, Padre Damião Silva, Padre João Carlos and others | Show dos 28 anos da Comunidade Obra de Maria | ≅ 25,000 | 2018 | November, 4 |
| Bruno & Marrone, Elba Ramalho, Padre Fábio de Melo, Luan Santana, Padre Marcelo Rossi and others | Show dos 30 anos da Comunidade Obra de Maria | N/A | 2020 | January, 17, 18 and 19 |
| Guns N' Roses | Guns N' Roses 2020 Tour | N/A | 2022 | September 4 |
| Milton Nascimento | One Final Music Session – Farewell Tour 2022 | N/A | 2022 | September 11 |
| Anitta featuring Felipe Mar | Ensaios da Anitta 2022 | N/A | 2023 | January 28 |

== In popular culture ==
- EA Sports added all 12 venues used at the 2014 FIFA World Cup, including the Arena Pernambuco, to the 2014 FIFA World Cup Brazil video game.
- The Arena Pernambuco is featured on "You Don't Have to Live Like a Referee", the sixteenth episode of the 25th season of the American animated sitcom The Simpsons, and the 546th episode of the series. Homer Simpson acts as a FIFA World Cup 2014 referee on a game played at Arena Pernambuco.

== See also ==
- List of football stadiums in Brazil
- Lists of stadiums
