= Eternamente =

Eternamente may refer to:

- "Eternamente", a song by pianist Angelo Mascheroni
- Eternamente, a 2009 studio album by Mexican pop singer Ana Gabriel
- Eternamente, a 2017 classical album by Romanian vocalist Angela Gheorghiu
- Eternamente, a 2009 studio album by American Tejano group Jimmy González y Grupo Mazz
- Eternamente, an album by Brazilian gospel singer Cassiane
- Eternamente, an album by Brazilian singer Cristina Mel
- Eternamente, an album by Portuguese band UHF
