= FM Dom Bosco =

FM Dom Bosco (ZYS 803)
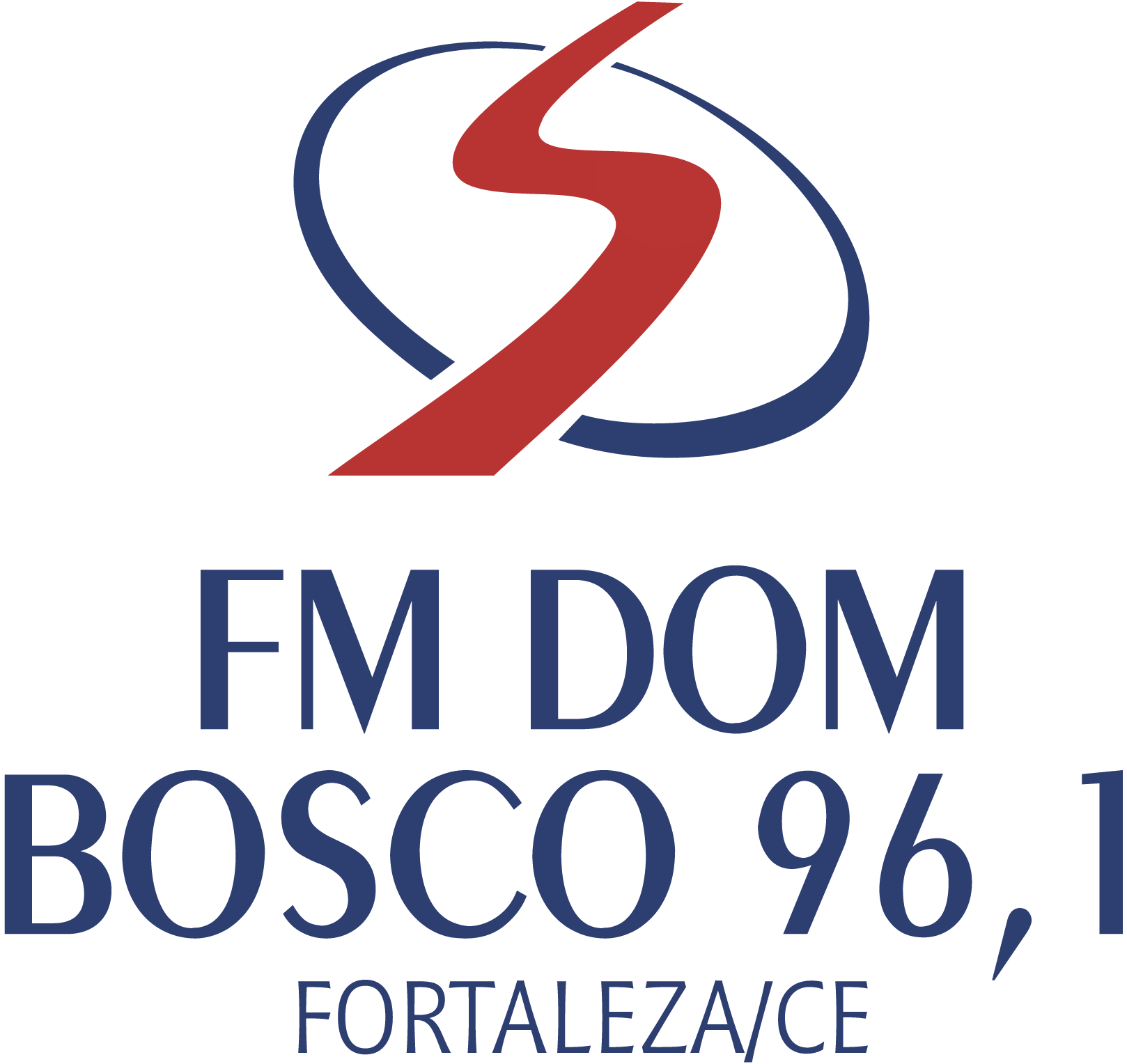

Fortaleza, Ceará; Brazil
- Frequency: 96.1 MHz

Programming
- Language: Portuguese
- Format: Catholic; Talk
- Affiliations: Rádio Imaculada

Ownership
- Owner: Fundação Educacional Salesiana Dom Bosco

History
- First air date: August 24, 1997

Technical information
- Licensing authority: ANATEL
- Class: A3
- ERP: 30.8 kW

Links
- Public license information: Profile
- Webcast: Listen live
- Website: fmdombosco.com

FM Dom Bosco (ZYS 803) is a radio station licensed to Fortaleza, Ceará, serving the respective metropolitan area. It is a Catholic radio station founded in 1997 and maintained by the Fundação Educacional Salesiana Dom Bosco.

== History ==
The station went on the air for the first time on August 24, 1997, under the name Rádio Comunitária Dom Bosco, on the frequency 97.5 MHz, a band initially reserved for community broadcasting. At the time, the station's founder, Father Sebastião, was in charge of the station, which initially worked from Monday to Sunday, from 6am to 7pm, with religious programming. After a year of existence, the radio began to have 24-hour content, using the early hours of the morning for music and messages. The station's professional staff included broadcasters who took turns broadcasting throughout the day.

For four years, Sebastião Alves sought authorization from the regulatory bodies to operate as an educational radio station. At the time, the priest also organized fundraising campaigns to buy equipment and set up the headquarters. On April 18, 2001, the Federal Senate approved the Act that granted the Fundação Educacional Salesiana Dom Bosco permission to carry out radio broadcasting services in modulated frequency.

The official debut as an educational radio station took place on August 1, 2001, with a speech by Fr. Sebastião Alves da Silveira, who recited a prayer and thanked God for the historic moment. Continuing its predominantly Catholic programming, the radio station premiered new programs, as well as broadcasting Masses and the recitation of the Marian Rosary at 6pm. The station also had professional broadcasters and volunteers who presented programs and operated the radio desk during the 18 hours of programming in rotation, such as Jurandir Vilanova, Gil França, Edvânio Alencar, Joana Campos, Maria Alves, Frei João Maria and Alex Ventura. In the early hours of the morning, the station started broadcasting the programming of Rede Milícia Sat.

When Fr. Sebastião moved to Recife, Fr. Orsini Nuvens Linard took over as director of the station. Later, new equipment was purchased to improve the sound quality. On August 30, 2008, it held its first major event, the 1st Evangelizar Dom Bosco with the presence of Padre Reginaldo Manzotti celebrating mass on Iracema Beach in Fortaleza, with more than 400,000 faithful. In 2012, the radio station appeared in Ibope's measurements as the second most listened to radio station in the capital.

With the departure of Fr. Orsini, Fr. Gilberto Antônio da Silva took over as radio director. With the new administration, several employees have been hired, digital equipment has been installed, the website and social networks have been redesigned, and a closer relationship has been established with the radio team and listeners.

Fr. José Mauro da Silva has been running the station since 2015.During this time, Fr. Mauro, together with the management team, employees and volunteers, has carried out many projects: training for employees, events, caravans in the neighborhoods and cities of the Greater Fortaleza, retreats, concerts, structural renovations in the environments, purchase of new equipment, etc.

As a highlight, 2019 saw the inauguration of a new 85-meter-high transmission tower and an increase in power from 5 KW to 12 KW. These changes allowed for greater coverage of the signal, reaching around 4.5 million inhabitants.
