= Adriana Arydes =

Brazilian Christian singer-songwriter

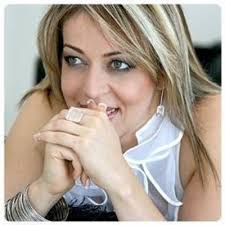

Background information
- Also known as: Adriana Arydes
- Born: Adriana Paula de Almeida Arydes; 18 April 1973 (age 53); Cruzeiro, São Paulo, Brazil
- Genres: Contemporary Christian Music, Worship Music
- Occupations: singer, songwriter
- Instruments: Voice, Classical guitar, bass, piano
- Years active: 1994–present
- Labels: Canção Nova (1994–1997); CODIMUC (1999–2002); Som Livre (2009); Paulinas-COMEP(2003–2016); Universal Music (2018–)
- Website: Adriana Arydes on Instagram

Adriana Paula de Almeida Arydes (18 April 1973), better known as Adriana Arydes, is a Brazilian singer and songwriter of Catholic Worship Music. She has 10 CDs and 2 DVDs recorded, in one of the most solid careers in Catholic music.

== Biography ==
Adriana Arydes was born on Holy Wednesday, 18 April 1973, in Cruzeiro, São Paulo.

Her parents are José de Arimatéia and Dona Auxiliadora Maria, and Adriana says that the family had the habit of getting together to listen to music. Adriana's story of singing began at the age of 7, playing at the masses of the Bom Jesus chapel in her hometown of Cruzeiro (SP). She recalls that at that time there was no music at Mass. Mother and daughter played at the celebrations until the guitar teacher set up a children's choir, which Adriana attended for several years. As a teenager, he joined the youth group and became part of the band that animated the meetings.

In 1982, Arydes began participating in the Rebanhões, in Cruzeiro, organized by Father Jonas Abib and the Canção Nova Community.

12 years later, Arydes would start his career in Catholic music. In 1994, she became part of the Canção Nova Band, with which she animated the first camps, masses and Thursdays of worship of Canção Nova.

At that time, for the first time she entered a studio professionally, to record the LP "Deus Há", the first work of the band Canção Nova. During this period, he also recorded backing vocals for Codimuc record albums. In 1999, she was invited to release her first solo CD by Codimuc.

"Reencontro" opened the way for her solo career and hit the big hits "Morte de Cruz" and "Abraço de Pai." In 2001, she released her second work, also by Codimuc. "Qual é a Chave" has leveraged the singer's career with the classic, "A Chave do Coração", besides the super hits "Chamado", "Quem Perder Sua Vida a Encontrará", "Amor que não se cansa", "Se compreendesses dom de Deus", "Doce Jesus", "Pacto de Esperança", "Colo de Mãe", "Pra te louvar" and "Ponto de Partida".

In 2003, Adriana left Codimuc and released her first album by Paulinas-Comep. In addition to the theme track, "Lindo Céu" also featured some of the hits that are still in the public memory to this day. Among them, "Nova Unção", "Glória e Majestade", "Nada é impossível para ti" and the beautiful "Coroação de Nossa Senhora".

In 2005, she launched "Mais Feliz". Her fourth album featured the tracks "Humano Amor de Deus", "Consolo", "Nossa Missão" and "Nova Jerusalém", in addition to the re-recording of the classic "Olhos no Espelho" and the Italian version "Lindo Cielo".

Her first DVD came in 2007. Bringing together the big hits of her career, "Adriana Live" brought two unreleased songs: "Reunidos Aqui" and "Eternamente Grata". The following year, the album won DVD and Gold Disc, surpassing 25,000 DVDs and 25,000 CDs sold.

"Jardim Secreto", the singer's sixth work, came in 2009, featuring the hits "Milagre", "Tocar em tuas vestes", "Eu sou um Jardim" and "Teu amor é maior". In the same year, he married Fabiano, assuming the surname Arydes.

In 2011, Adriana Arydes released the album "Coisas que vivi" and once again achieved several hits. Among them, "Te farei vencer", "O Segredo", "Só é feliz quem ama", "Jesus, meu amigo" and "Tu és Santo".

In 2013, Adriana expressed on a record the most intense experience ever lived by her: “Ser Mãe”. This is the title of the eighth CD of the singer. A project specially produced to share the unique moment Adriana was living. Highlights include the tracks "Aprendendo a ser mãe", "Mãe do Eterno Amor" and, of course, the theme track, "Ser Mãe". In addition, to career records, Adriana also released two collections: “Milagres”, released in 2009, by Som Livre record label, and “Adriana – Coletânea”, released by Paulina-Comep.

In 2014, the second DVD, “Adriana Arydes – Live”, brings together some of the biggest hits of the singer's career. One of the highlights of the album is the unreleased "Guardiões". The letter expresses the attitude of those who struggle to defend the family. Adriana says that the production of the DVD lasted more than two years. Another highlight is the song “Halleluyah”, which features guest appearances by Ziza Fernandes, Davidson Silva, Fatima Souza and Adelso Freire.

== Discography ==
Year	Album Details	Sales and Certifications
1999	Reencontro: Label: CODIMUC; Formats: CD	Gold – 100,000
2001	Qual É A Chave?: Label: CODIMUC; Formats: CD	Gold – 100,000
2003	Lindo Céu: Label: Paulinas COMEP; Formats: CD	Gold – 100,000
2005	Mais Feliz: Label: Paulinas COMEP; Formats: CD	Gold 60,000
2007	Adriana Ao Vivo: Label: Paulinas COMEP; Formats: CD, DVD	Gold 70,000 (CD) +30.000 (DVD)
2009	Milagres: Label: Som Livre; Formats: CD	Gold +95.000
2009	Jardim Secreto: Label: Paulinas COMEP; Formats: CD	Gold 80,000
2010	Coletânea Série Ouro: Label: Paulinas COMEP; Formats: CD	20,000
2011	Coisas Que Vivi: Label: Paulinas COMEP; Formats: CD	Gold 70,000
2013	Ser Mãe...: Label: Paulinas COMEP; Formats: CD	20.000
2014	Adriana Arydes Ao Vivo: Label: Paulinas COMEP; Formats: CD, DVD	
2018	Sagrado: Label: Universal Music; Formats: CD	

=== Singles ===
- Abraço de Pai – 1999
- Resgate – 2000
- A Chave do Coração – 2001
- Chamado – 2002
- Jovem Te Olho – 2003
- Lindo Céu – 2003
- Nova Unção – 2004
- Glória e Majestade – 2005
- Nova Manhã – 2005
- Nossa Missão – 2005
- Nova Jerusálem – 2005
- Humano Amor de Deus – 2006
- Reunidos Aqui – 2007
- Milagres – 2009
- Tocar em Tuas Vestes – 2009
- Teu Milagre – 2009
- Eu sou um Jardim – 2010
- Minha Graça te Basta – 2011
- Coisas que Vivi – 2012
- Ser Mãe... – 2013
- O Menor Da Casa Sou Eu – 2016
- Deus Está No Controle – 2018
- Sara Brasil – 2018
- O Poço - 2020

== Tours ==
Ano	Títle
1999–2001	Adriana Ao Vivo – Tour Reencontro
2001–2003	Adriana Ao Vivo – Qual é a Chave?
2003–2005	Adriana Ao Vivo – Tour Mais Feliz
2005–2006	Adriana Ao Vivo
2006–2007	Tour Enredados Brasil
2007–2008	Adriana Ao Vivo
2008–2009	Adriana Ao Vivo – Tour Milagres
2009–2010	Adriana Ao Vivo – Tour Milagres
2010–2011	Adriana Ao Vivo – Tour Jardim Secreto
2012–2013	Adriana Ao Vivo – Tour Coisas Que Vivi
2017	Adriana Ao Vivo – Tour 2017

== Awards and nominations ==
Year	Award	Category	Result
2008	I Online Trophy – CatolicosNews	2007 Best Singer	Won
2008	I Online Trophy – CatolicosNews	2007 Best Music: Humano Amor de Deus (partnership with Father Fábio de Melo)	Won
2009	Louvemos O Senhor Trophy	Best Singer	Won
2009	Louvemos O Senhor Trophy	Highlight of the Year	Nominated
2010	Louvemos o Senhor Trophy	Best Singer	Won
2010	Louvemos o Senhor Trophy	Best collecting: Milagres	Won
2010	Louvemos o Senhor Trophy	Highlight of the Year	Nominated
2010	Louvemos o Senhor Trophy	Female Interpreter	Nominated
2012	Louvemos o Senhor Trophy	Best Singer	Won
2012	Louvemos o Senhor Trophy	Best Song: Coisas Que Vivi	Won
2012	Louvemos o Senhor Trophy	Female Interpreter	Won
2012	Louvemos o Senhor Trophy	Best Pop Album: Coisas Que Vivi	Nominated
2012	Louvemos o Senhor Trophy	Best Recording: Coisas Que Vivi	Nominated
2014	Louvemos o Senhor Trophy	Best Singer	Won
2014	Louvemos o Senhor Trophy	Artistic Personality	Nominated
2014	Louvemos o Senhor Trophy	Female Interpreter	Nominated
2014	Louvemos o Senhor Trophy	Best Alternative Album: Ser Mãe...	Nominated
2015	Louvemos o Senhor Trophy	Best Singer	Won
2015	Louvemos o Senhor Trophy	Artistic Personality	Won
2015	Louvemos o Senhor Trophy	Female Interpreter	Won
2015	Louvemos o Senhor Trophy	Best Album Pop: Adriana Arydes Ao Vivo	Won
2015	Louvemos o Senhor Trophy	DVD of the Year: Adriana Arydes Ao Vivo	Nominated
2015	Louvemos o Senhor Trophy	Best Recording DVD: Adriana Arydes Ao Vivo	Won
2015	Louvemos o Senhor Trophy	Music of the Year: Guardiões	Nominated
2019	20th Annual Latin Grammy Awards	Best Christian Album (Portuguese Language) (for Gente)	Nominated
