= Reginaldo Manzotti discography =

The Padre Reginaldo Manzotti discography, a Brazilian singer and priest, is composed of eleven studio albums, four live albums, four video albums, two digital singles and an EP digital.

== Albums ==
=== Studio albums ===
List of studio albums with selected stop positions, sales numbers and certifications
Title	Album details	Best positions	Sales	Certifications
Title	Album details	BRA	Sales	Certifications
Deus é Presença Real	Released: 4 June 2003; Label: Independent; Formats: CD	—	100.000	Gold
No Poder da Oração	Released: 2005; Restarted (Music download): 10 April 2010; Label: Som Livre; Formats: CD, music download	—	40.000	Gold
A Tempestade Vai Passar	Released: 1 January 2007; Restarted (musical download): 2010; Label: Som Livre; Formats: CD, musical download	—	50.000	Gold
Creio no Deus do Impossível	Released: 2008; Restarted (musical download): 10 April 2010; Label: Som Livre; Formats: CD, musical download	—		
Sinais do Sagrado	Released: 25 January 2010; Label: Som Livre; Formats: CD, musical download	6		
Em Deus um Milagre	Released: 10 November 2011; Label: Som Livre; Formats: CD, musical download	—		
Faça-Me Crer	Released: 30 September 2013; Label: Som Livre; Formats: CD, musical download	1	80.000	Platinum
O Amor Restaura	Released: 2 March 2015; Label: Som Livre; Formats: CD, musical download	1		
Entre Amigos	Released: 14 August 2015; Label: Som Livre; Formats: CD, musical download	—		
Momentos	Released: 21 October 2016; Label: Som Livre; Formats: CD, download digital	—		
Tá Na Mão de Deus	Released: 20 April 2018; Label: Universal Music; Formats: CD, musical download	—		

=== Live albums ===
Live albums list
Title	Album details
Creio no Deus do Impossível – ao Vivo	Released: 1 January 2009; Label: Som Livre; Formats: DVD
Milhões de Vozes – ao Vivo em Fortaleza	Released: 29 March 2011; Label: Som Livre; Formats: CD, DVD, musical download
Paz e Luz – Candelária ao Vivo	Released: 30 September 2012; Label: Som Livre; Formats: CD, DVD, musical download
Alma Missionária – ao Vivo	Released: 4 March 2016; Label: Som Livre; Formats: CD, DVD, musical download

=== Vídeo albums ===
List of studio albums with selected stop positions, sales numbers and certifications
Titles	Album details	Sales	Certifications
Creio no Deus do Impossível – ao Vivo	Released: 1 January 2009; Label: Som Livre; Formats: DVD	100.000	2× Platinum
Milhões de Vozes – ao Vivo em Fortaleza	Released: 29 March 2011; Label: Som Livre; Formats: CD, DVD, musical download		
Paz e Luz – Candelária ao Vivo	Released: 30 September 2012; Label: Som Livre; Formats: CD, DVD, musical download		
Alma Missionária – ao Vivo	Released: 4 March 2016; Label: Som Livre; Formats: CD, DVD, musical download		

=== Singles ===
Singles List
Titles	Album details
Obrigado Jesus	Released: 23 September 2013; Label: Som Livre; Formats: Musical download
Tá Na Mão De Deus	Released: 22 December 2017; Label: Universal Music; Formats: Musical download
Espalhar Amor (EP)	Released: 23 March 2018; Label: Universal Music; Formats: Musical download
