= Antônio Cardoso (musician) =

Brazilian singer-songwriter (born 1957)

- Birth name: Antônio Cardoso da Silva Carvalho
- Born: February 7, 1957 (age 68); Miguel Calmon, Bahia, Brazil
- Genres: Contemporary Catholic liturgical music
- Occupation: Singer-songwriter
- Instrument: Voice
- Years active: 1979–present
- Labels: Paulinas COMEP
- Website: antoniocardoso.com.br

Antônio Cardoso da Silva Carvalho (born February 7, 1957) is a Brazilian singer-songwriter of Christian songs, particularly of Catholic music.

== Biography ==
Cardoso was born on February 7, 1957, in Miguel Calmon, to Antônio Silva de Carvalho and Sílvia Cardoso de Carvalho. He learned musical culture from his father who was a musician and from 1975 he moved to São Paulo and then as a musician was supported by Padre Zezinho. Initially he was part of LP's in the Pauline Editions and since 1979 started a solo career. From 1986 to 1989, he paused his recording career to perform in Brazil.

== Discography ==
- Direitos de Menino, 1979
- Migrante, 1980, (first solo LP)
- Histórias da gente, 1981
- Teimosia, 1982
- Trilhos de fé, 1985
- Antonio Cardoso, 1989, with Padre Zezinho's participation
- Juntos, 1990
- Quando se vive um grande amor, 1991, double with Padre Zezinho
- Diante de ti, 1992
- Amor de Pai, 1993
- Antonio Cardoso, 1994
- Aprendiz, 1996, Padre Zezinho's production
- Juntos, 1998
- Quando se vive um grande amor, 2001
- Diante de ti, 2004
- Amor de Pai, 2007
- Pede um amor às estrelas, 2010
- Coletânea, 2012

== Louvemos ao Senhor Trophy ==
In 2016, Cardoso was one of the winners of the eighth edition of the Louvemos ao Senhor Trophy with liturgical songs: "Na Tua Presença, Senhor" e “Uma Casa Iluminada por Jesus”, in the composer category.

== See also ==
- Padre Zezinho
