= Irala (surname) =

Irala is a surname of Basque origin. Notable people with the surname include:

- Adriano Irala (1894–1933), Paraguayan professor and journalist
- Blas Irala (born 1983), Paraguayan footballer
- Casimiro Abdon Irala Arguello (born 1936), Brazilian Jesuit priest and musician
- Domingo Martínez de Irala (1509–1556), Spanish conquistador
- Padre Irala (1936–2024), Paraguayan-Brazilian Jesuit priest, writer, musician and songwriter
- Pedro Richard Irala (born 1979), Paraguayan footballer
- Severiano Irala (died 2012), Paraguayan footballer
