= Puro Amor =

Puro Amor may refer to:

- Puro Amor, album by Dom Salvador 2002
- Puro Amor, album by Los Tucanes de Tijuana 2003
- Puro Amor, album by Cassiane 1996
