= Guilherme de Sá =

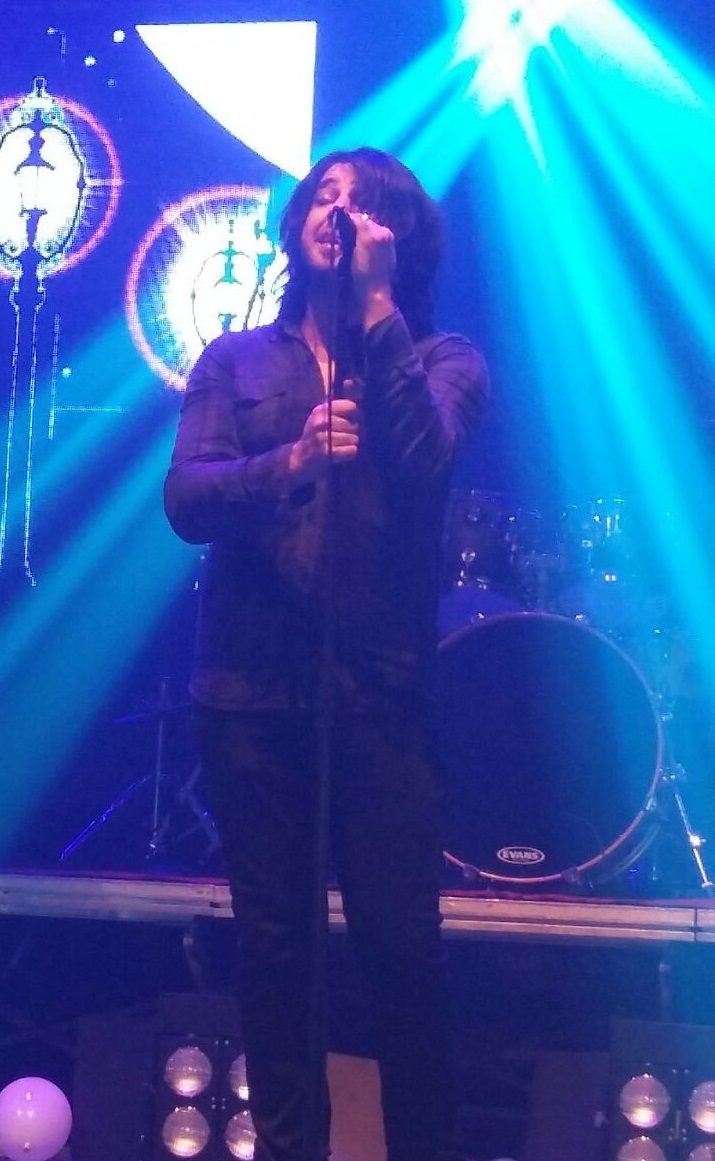

Background information
- Born: December 10, 1980 (age 45); Limeira, São Paulo, Brazil
- Genres: Christian rock, alternative rock
- Occupations: singer, composer
- Instruments: Voice, classical guitar
- Years active: 2001–present
- Labels: Codimuc, Som Livre

Guilherme de Sá (born December 10, 1980) is a Brazilian singer, songwriter, writer, poet, music producer and arranger, best known for being the former vocalist of the rock band Rosa de Saron from 2001 to 2019, having his last performance with the group on February 10, 2019, in São Paulo.

== Biography ==
Despite being born in Limeira, Guilherme de Sá lived almost his entire childhood in the city of Artur Nogueira. At the age of 10, he moved to neighboring Cosmópolis, where he had a troubled adolescence due to his stepfather's abusive relationship. At the age of 10, he began singing in a prayer group at Santa Gertrudes parish, thus beginning his history in music. At age 15, he moved to Artur Nogueira where he went to live with his grandmother. He joined Hohenzöllern, a Pop Rock covers band, performing in numerous bars and festivals. At the age of 17, he converted to Catholicism, leaving not only Rock, but also the group in which he sang. A new phase in Guilherme's life then began, singing in church. During this period, he developed and became a music teacher. Acquired a taste for Opera and had a successful career singing at weddings and university performances. In early 2001, he sent a recording to a test when the band Rosa de Saron was looking for a new singer, considering their former had left the group. Two months later, precisely on March 11, Guilherme joined the group, becoming the band's leader .

He debuted on the album Depois do Inverno, released in 2002. Since the album Casa dos Espelhos, released in 2005, he was responsible for the musical production of all the albums, including recording all the music instruments on most of them. However, it was with the DVDs Acústico e ao Vivo and Horizonte Vivo Distante, released in 2008 and 2010 respectively, that he established his name as one of the main rock vocals in the country, with a drive and technical control above standards. In addition, he was also the band's main composer, having composed more than 100 songs. For his performances in the band, he won the Louvemos o Senhor Trophy several times in the Best Singer category. He also received two nominations for the Latin Grammy Awards in Las Vegas. With Rosa de Saron, he received several Gold Records and a Platinum Record. He performed at WYD in Madrid and Rio de Janeiro, the latter for more than 4 million people on Copacabana beach, having sung as a solo at the vigil for Pope Francis. Guilherme remains self-taught and belongs to the select group of musicians with absolute pitch .

Starting in 2015, Sá started to perform as a solo artist alongside Mauro Henrique, lead singer of Oficina G3, and singer Leonardo Gonçalves. The three formed the project Loop Session + Friends, who performed in several theaters nationwide.

In 2017, Sá announced the release of his first solo album, titled Íngreme, distributed by the record company Som Livre. The song "Ágora" was chosen as the first single to promote the album. That same year, he wrote the book Entre Bardos e Druídas released by Editora Planeta, where together with his Jesuit friend Father Bruno Franguelli, he wove a dense epistolary project about hope

On November 13, 2018, Guilherme de Sá announced his departure from Rosa de Saron through a video on the band's Facebook account. On November 14, he released the single "A Última Canção" on digital platforms and the music video on YouTube. In 2019 after the last show with Rosa de Saron, he moved to Florence, Italy, with his wife Pamela and his 3 children Lívia, Laura and Nuno. They currently lives with in York, England.

== Discography ==
=== Rosa de Saron ===
==== Studio albums ====
- (2002) Depois do Inverno
- (2005) Casa dos Espelhos
- (2007) Acústico
- (2009) Horizonte Distante
- (2012) O Agora e o Eterno
- (2014) Cartas ao Remetente
- (2018) Gran Paradiso

==== Live/video albums ====
- (2008) Acústico e ao Vivo
- (2010) Horizonte Vivo Distante
- (2013) Latitude, Longitude
- (2015) Acústico e ao Vivo 2/3

=== Solo ===
- (2017) Íngreme
- (2019) Diminuto, Pt. 1
- (2020) Homemade
- (2021) Fermata XI
- (2024) Tempestade

=== Books ===
- (2017) Entre Bardos e Druídas
- (2022) Siracvsa
