= Histórias e Bicicletas (Reflexões, Encontros e Esperança) =

Studio album by Oficina G3
- Released: 30 April 2013
- Recorded: RAK Studios, London
- Genre: Progressive metal, folk metal, christian rock
- Length: 61:58
- Label: MK Music
- Producer: Oficina G3

Oficina G3 chronology
Depois da Guerra (2008)	Histórias e Bicicletas (Reflexões, Encontros e Esperança) (2013)

Histórias e Bicicletas (Reflexões, Encontros e Esperança) English: Histories and Bicycles (Reflections, Encounters and Hope) is the eleven album by Oficina G3, released by MK Music in 2013. This is the second album with the new lead singer Mauro Henrique and the one with Alexandre Aposan.

Professional ratings
Review scores
Source	Rating
O Propagador	4/5 stars

== Track listing ==
1. "Diz" – 5:42
2. "Água Viva" – 6:20
3. "Encontro" – 6:21
4. "Confiar" – 5:13
5. "Não Ser" – 5:52
6. "Compartilhar" – 4:59
7. "Descanso" – 5:18
8. "Aos Pés da Cruz" – 4:01
9. "Sou Eu" – 5:41
10. "Lágrimas" – 7:17
11. "Save Me From Myself" – 4:16

== Personnel ==
- Mauro Henrique: vocals, guitar
- Juninho Afram: electric guitar, vocals
- Duca Tambasco: bass
- Jean Carllos: keyboard, piano, vocals
- Alexandre Aposan: drums

=== Additional personnel ===
- Leonardo Gonçalves: vocals in "Lágrimas"
- Richard Woodcraft: mixing

== Certifications ==
Region	Certification	Certified units/sales
Brazil (Pro-Música Brasil)	Gold	20,000^{*}
^{*} Sales figures based on certification alone.
