= Elektracustika =

Studio album by Oficina G3
- Released: 2007
- Genre: Christian Rock; Acoustic Rock
- Label: MK Music

Oficina G3 chronology
| Além do que os olhos podem ver (2005) | Elektracustika (2007) | Depois Da Guerra (2008) |

Elektracustika is the ninth studio album by Oficina G3, and the fourth released by MK Music. This album introduces new versions of old songs of the Oficina G3, and brings four new songs.

On 9 November 2008, the album was certified with a Gold by Pro-Música Brasil, due to more than 40,000 copies sold. To promote the album, the music video for the single "Eu, Lázaro" was released. The project received nominations for the Troféu Talento in 2008. It was also nominated for the Latin Grammy Award for Best Christian Album in Portuguese Language.

== Track listing ==
1. "Intro" - 0:56
2. "Além do Que os Olhos Podem Ver" - 4:18 (from Além do que os olhos podem ver, 2005)
3. "Desculpas" - 3:50 (from Humanos, 2002)
4. "Mais Alto" - 4:08 (from Além do que os olhos podem ver, 2005)
5. "Cura-me" - 3:49
6. "Resposta de Deus" - 4:19 (from Nada é tão novo, Nada tão velho, 1993)
7. "A Deus" - 5:01
8. "Eu, Lázaro" - 4:57
9. "Ele Vive" - 4:17 (from O Tempo, 2000)
10. "Razão" - 4:08 (from Nada é tão novo, Nada tão velho, 1993)
11. "Preciso Voltar" - 4:37 (from O Tempo, 2000)
12. "A Lição" - 4:05 (from Além do que os olhos podem ver, 2005)
13. "Deserto" - 4:31
14. "Perfeito Amor" - 3:41 (from O Tempo, 2000)
15. "Me Faz Ouvir" - 3:44

== Personnel ==
- Juninho Afram: guitar, acoustic guitar, vocals
- Duca Tambasco: bass
- Jean Carllos: keyboard

== Certifications ==
| Region | Certification | Certified units/sales |
|---|---|---|
| Brazil (Pro-Música Brasil) | Gold | 30,000^{*} |
^{*} Sales figures based on certification alone.
