= Depois da Guerra =

Studio album by Oficina G3
- Released: 2008
- Recorded: NaCena Studios, São Paulo; MR. Som Studios, São Paulo
- Genre: Progressive metal Christian metal Metalcore
- Length: 69:40
- Label: MK Music
- Producer: Heros Trench; Marcelo Pompeu

Oficina G3 chronology
Elektracustika (2007)	Depois da Guerra (2008)	Histórias e Bicicletas (Reflexões, Encontros e Esperança) (2013)

Depois da Guerra (English: After the War) is the tenth studio album by Oficina G3, and the fifth released by MK Music. This is the first album with the new lead vocalist Mauro Henrique. The band won the 2009 Latin Grammy Award for Best Christian Album (Portuguese Language) in 2009.

== Track listing ==
1. "D.A.G." - 1:05
2. "Meus Próprios Meios" - 4:53 (My Own Ways)
3. "Eu Sou" - 5:53 (I Am)
4. "Meus Passos" - 5:04 (My Steps)
5. "Continuar" - 4:28 (Continue)
6. "De Joelhos" - 5:20 (On My Knees)
7. "Tua Mão" - 4:27 (Thy Hand)
8. "Muros" - 4:59 (Walls)
9. "Depois Da Guerra" - 4:55 (After The War)
10. "A Ele" - 4:40 (To Him)
11. "Incondicional" - 4:16 (Unconditional)
12. "Obediência" - 5:05 (Obedience)
13. "Better" - 6:22
14. "People Get Ready" - 4:01
15. "Unconditional" - 4:15

== Personnel ==
- Mauro Henrique – vocals
- Juninho Afram – guitar, vocals
- Duca Tambasco – bass
- Jean Carllos – keyboards

=== Additional personnel ===
- Celso Machado – guitar on "People Get Ready"
- Alexandre Aposan – drums

== Certifications ==
Region	Certification	Certified units/sales
Brazil (Pro-Música Brasil)	Gold	30,000^{*}
^{*} Sales figures based on certification alone.
