= Além do que os Olhos Podem Ver =

Studio album by Oficina G3
- Released: February 2005
- Genre: Christian rock
- Length: 46:19
- Label: MK Publicitá

Oficina G3 chronology
Humanos (2003)	Além do que os Olhos Podem Ver (2005)	Elektracustika (2007)

Além do que os Olhos Podem Ver (English: Beyond What The Eyes Can See) is the sixth studio album by Oficina G3, released in 2005.

== Track listing ==
No.	Title	Length
1.	"Intro"	0:24
2.	"Mais Alto"	3:24
3.	"Réu ou Juiz"	3:12
4.	"Meu Legado"	3:18
5.	"Através da Porta"	3:33
6.	"Além do que os Olhos Podem Ver"	3:31
7.	"A Lição"	3:57
8.	"O Fim É Só o Começo"	5:35
9.	"Lugar Melhor"	3:15
10.	"Amanhã"	3:58
11.	"Sem Trégua" (featuring Marcão)	3:14
12.	"De Olhos Fechados"	4:01
13.	"Ver Acontecer"	3:57
14.	"Queria Te Dizer"	3:40
Total length:		46:19

== Personnel ==
Oficina G3:

- Juninho Afram – vocals, guitar, acoustic guitar
- Duca Tambasco – bass
- Jean Carllos – keyboards

Session musicians:

- Lufe – drums
