= Alexandre Soul =

- Born: Alexandre Emanuel Cláudio; 28 July 1972 (age 54); São Paulo, São Paulo, Brazil
- Genres: Contemporary Catholic liturgical music, soul music
- Occupations: Singer, composer
- Instrument: Voice
- Years active: 1994–present
- Website: https://www.alexandresoul.com.br/

Alexandre Soul is a singer of Catholic Christian music. He was nominated for a Latin Grammy Award in 2005.

== Biography ==
Alexandre Emanuel Cláudio was born on 28 July 1972.

In high school, he set up his first national and international rock cover band, playing at school festivals and neighborhood parties. Over the years, Alexander became increasingly interested in the arts, so much so that he eventually studied Art Education at Alcântara Machado College of Arts. At this college he got to know the arts as a whole but became more interested in theater and music.

Acting in various works, Alexandre has always sought to unite his two artistic passions, music and theater. He went through many groups and bands where he experimented with different styles and rhythms and thus began his professional career in the city of São Paulo.

In 1991, he voluntarily joined the Catholic entity CCEV (Community House Hope and Life) where recovering drug and alcohol addicts where began a work involving the arts in the treatment of recovering. That same year he set up a work with a rock band where he was one of the protagonists. With the task of doing the drug prevention work, this rock band called Eterna recorded and released their first CD in 1994. After great success Eterna's work became known in Brazil. Being invited to show the success of her work with drug addicts through the arts, in 1998, Eterna participated in the David International Multifestival of Arts in Barcelona, Spain.

In 1999, Alexandre became the host of a television musical program called "Canto da Hora" by producer ASJ (now 21st Century TV). In this program that aired throughout Brazil by Redevida de Televisão and later, also by TV Século XXI itself, there were singers, bands, theater and dance groups that Alexandre helped to discover and launch throughout Brazil.

In the year 2000, Alexandre Soul chose to pursue a solo musical career and to dedicate himself to his studies, when he joined FASCS (São Caetano do Sul Arts Foundation) where he began to study composition and conducting.

Since 2001 he became a volunteer of the New Generation Association that takes care of drug addicts. Due to the taste for the style "soul music" Alexander adopted the artistic surname "Soul", becoming known and called by Alexandre Soul. In 2005 released the first solo album of his career, the CD "Cantando, Dançando e Louvando!", a work with influences of soul music and also of MPB.

This first CD, produced musically by Alexandre Soul himself, was nominated for 2005 Latin Grammy Award in the category of "Best Christian Music Album in Portuguese". Alexandre Soul produced and released in 2011 his second album, the CD "Joelhos no Chão". In this album, Alexandre continued the work of drug and alcohol prevention talking about everyday life, addressing themes related to family, relationships, work and so on. It is also worth mentioning that the CD "Joelhos no Chão" was awarded in 2011 for the Louvemos ao Senhor Trophy of TV Século XXI in the category of best independent album.

Alexandre Soul is also a graduate of the Célia Helena Theater School, where he participated in several plays presented in the school's own theater, open to the public.

== Awards ==
In the 2011 edition of the Louvemos ao Senhor Trophy, Soul won the award for best independent album, Joelhos no Chão.'

== Discography ==
- 2005 – Cantando, Dançando e Louvando!
- 2011 – Joelhos no Chão
