= Cristina Mel =

- Born: March 10, 1964 (age 62); Brás de Pina, Rio de Janeiro, Brazil
- Genres: Devotional music, Gospel music, pop
- Occupations: Singer; songwriter; Christian minister; teacher; missionary
- Years active: 1991–present
- Labels: Bompastor; Line; MK; Sony
- Website: www.cristinamel.com.br

Maria Cristina Mel de Almeida Costa (born March 10, 1964) is a Brazilian singer, songwriter, Christian minister, teacher and missionary. She made her recording debut in 1990 under the guidance of Bompastor executive Isaias Costa, and performed in gospel and secular media.

== Biography ==
At age 16, after her parents' divorce, she was invited by a friend Gopel to attend a church in Rio de Janeiro, an American Christian group, The Continental Singers and Orchestra, under the pretext of practicing English. Mel became a Christian and "saw the bitterness of her life to become a honey". New heart, new life, with forgiveness, restoration, joy and peace. Cristina Mel had born just at that moment – as reported by herself.

After a 20-year career singing gospel and secular music, with national and international performances she has sold over five million copies, with gold in all the burned CDs without the awards have achieved with simple platinum and double platinum. Her musical career has reached both the gospel market in Portuguese (in Brazil and abroad), as the Latin market. Cristina Mel has also produced, with special focus on whole albums, dedicated exclusively to children.

== Discography ==
| Year | Album | Sales |
|---|---|---|
| 1990 | Tá Decidido | 50,000 |
| 1992 | Pra Sempre | 500,000 |
| 1993 | Mil Horizontes | 100,000 |
| 1994 | Refúgio de Amor | 650,000 |
| 1995 | Mel | 450,000 |
| 1996 | Gratidão | 200,000 |
| 1997 | Dê Carinho | 400,000 |
| 1998 | Presente de Deus | 150,000 |
| 1998 | Um Toque de amor | 800,000 |
| 1999 | Tem Coisas que a Gente não Esquece | 220,000 |
| 2000 | Sempre Te Amei | 190,000 |
| 2001 | Tudo Por Você | 500,000 |
| 2002 | Você é um Vencedor | 200,000 |
| 2003 | Eternamente | 300,000 |
| 2005 | Recomeçar | 270,000 |
| 2005 | As Canções da Minha Vida: 15 Anos Ao Vivo | 290,000 |
| 2006 | Um Novo Tempo | 170,000 |
| 2009 | Ame Mesmo Assim | 50,000 |
| 2011 | Som do Amor | 35,000 |
| 2013 | Eu Respiro Adoração | 30,000 |
| 2019 | Rompendo o Silêncio | 1,000 |

=== Children's Albums ===
| Year | Album | Sales |
|---|---|---|
| 1999 | Amiguinhos do Coração | 50,000 |
| 2000 | www.conto.com.você | 100,000 |
| 2001 | Mania de ser Feliz | 50,000 |
| 2002 | 4 Kids | 100,000 |
| 2003 | Por um Mundo Melhor | 200,000 |
| 2004 | Tempo de Ser Criança | 50,000 |
| 2006 | Cristina Mel e os Vegetais | 50,000 |
| 2009 | Turminha da Cristina Mel | 15,000 |
| 2010 | Clube da Cristina Mel | 50,000 |
| 2012 | Clube da Cristina Mel 2 | 20,000 |
| 2014 | Turminha da Cristina Mel: Fazendo a diferença | 20,000 |
| 2017 | Turminha da Cristina Mel: Para Brincar e Aprender | — |
