= Oficina G3 =

Brazilian Christian metal band

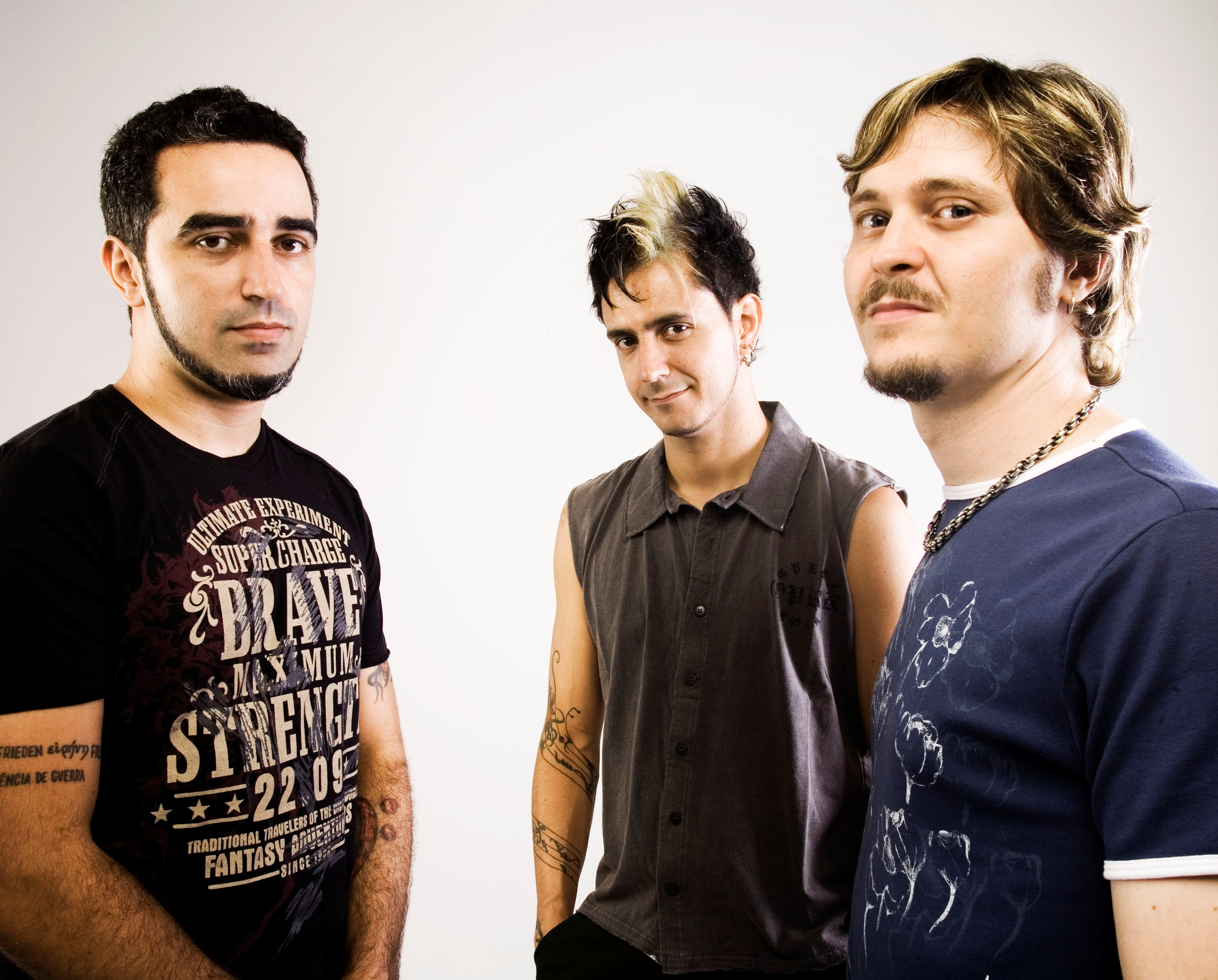
- Oficina G3: Duca Tambasco, Jean Carllos and Juninho Afram

Background information
- Origin: São Paulo, Brazil
- Genres: Christian metal, heavy metal, hard rock, progressive metal, nu metal
- Years active: 1987–present
- Labels: Gospel Records (1990-2000); MK Music (2000-2016)
- Members: Juninho Afram; Jean Carllos; Duca Tambasco
- Past members: Mauro Henrique; Luciano Manga; P.G. Walter Lopes; Wagner García; Alexandre Aposan
- Website: Oficina G3

Oficina G3 is a Christian metal band from São Paulo, Brazil. Lead vocalist and guitarist Juninho Afram formed the band along with drummer Walter Lopes and bassist Wagner García in 1987. Through their history they have changed their musical style very drastically. Initially they were a heavy metal / hard rock band with influences from Petra and Stryper, then they changed to a more pop rock and metal oriented genre, and recently changing to a more progressive metal driven musical style.

The band is regarded in Brazil as one of the pioneers of Christian rock in that country, and one of the bands which most contributed to the progress of that musical genre. The band has met considerable success, being nominated to Latin Grammy Awards three times recently, in 2005 and in 2007, and winning the 2009 Best Brazilian Christian Album "Depois Da Guerra".

== Band members ==
Current

- Juninho Afram — guitar, vocals (1987–present)
- Jean Carllos — keyboards (1995–present)
- Duca Tambasco — bass (1994–present)

Former

- Mauro Henrique — lead vocals (2008–2020)
- Manga — lead vocals (1987–1998)
- P.G. — lead vocals (1998–2003)
- Walter Lopes — drums (1987–2001)
- Wagner Garcia — bass (1987–1993)
- Woody Carvalho — keyboard (1989–1994)
- Alexandre Aposan — drums (2007–2014)
- Tulio Regis - Lead vocals 1980-1986)

== Discography ==
Studio albums

Title	Details
Nada é tão novo, Nada é tão velho	Released: 1993; Label: Gospel Records; Format: CD
Indiferença	Released: 1996; Label: Gospel Records; Format: CD
Acústico	Released: 1998; Label: Gospel Records; Format: CD
O Tempo	Released: October, 2000; Label: MK Music; Format: CD
Humanos	Released: September 11, 2002; Label: MK Music; Format: CD
Além do que os Olhos Podem Ver	Released: February, 2005; Label: MK Music; Format: CD, download digital
Elektracustika	Released: May 21, 2007; Label: MK Music; Format: CD, download digital
Depois da Guerra	Released: December 3, 2008; Label: MK Music; Format: CD, download digital
Histórias e Bicicletas (Reflexões, Encontros e Esperança)	Released: April 30, 2013; Label: MK Music; Format: CD, download digital

Live albums

Title	Details
Ao Vivo	Released: 1990; Label: Gospel Records; Format: CD
Acústico Ao Vivo	Released: 1999; Label: Gospel Records; Format: CD

Videography

Title	Details
Acústico Ao Vivo	Released: 1999; Label: Gospel Records; Format: DVD
O Tempo Ao Vivo	Released: 2002; Label: MK Music; Format: DVD
D.D.G. Experience (Live Santa Barbara D'Oeste)	Released: September 9, 2010; Label: MK Music; Format: DVD
Histórias e Bicicletas	Released: 2015; Label: MK Music; Format: DVD

Compilations

Title	Details
The Best of Oficina G3	Released: 2000; Label: Gospel Records; Format: CD
Platinum	Released: 2002; Label: Gospel Records; Format: CD
MK CD Ouro: As 10 Mais de Oficina G3	Released: 2006; Label: MK Music; Format: CD
Som Gospel	Released: 2008; Label: MK Music; Format: CD
Gospel Collection	Released: September, 2014; Label: MK Music; Format: CD
