= Rosa de Saron =

Brazilian rock band

- Origin: Campinas, São Paulo, Brazil
- Genres: Christian metal, hard rock
- Years active: 1988–present
- Labels: CODIMUC, Som Livre
- Members: Rogério Feltrin; Eduardo Faro; Wellington Greve; Bruno Faglioni
- Past members: Marcelo Machado; Sandão; Alex Nozaki; Eduardo Bortolatto; Guilherme de Sá
- Website: rosadesaron.com.br

Rosa de Saron is a Christian-themed Brazilian rock band that formed within the Catholic Charismatic Renewal movement in 1988, in Campinas, known for being one of the forerunners of Christian metal in Brazil. The band currently consists of Bruno Faglioni (vocals), Eduardo Faro (guitar), Rogério Feltrin (bass), and Wellington Greve (drums). Their first album, Diante da Cruz, was released in 1994, and they released their next album, Angústia Suprema, in 1997. In 1999, the band recorded Olhando de Frente. In 2002, after a change of vocalists, Rosa de Saron launched the album Depois do Inverno. Their next record, Casa dos Espelhos, came out in 2005, and in 2007, they put out Acoustic CD.

In 2008, to celebrate twenty years of activity, released their first live album, Acústico e ao Vivo. The band followed up with the album Horizonte Distante. In 2010, released their second live album, Horizonte Vivo Distante, nominated for a Latin Grammy Awards. In 2011, released an EP titled Siete Camiños, with songs re-recorded in different languages, and presented it at World Youth Day 2011 in Madrid. In 2012, released the album O Agora e o Eterno. In 2013, released their third live album, Latitude, Longitude. In 2014, released the album Cartas ao Remetente. In 2015, released their fourth live album, Acústico e ao Vivo 2/3. In 2016, to commemorate 28 years of activity, released their first compilation album, Essencial: Rosa de Saron. In 2018, released the album Gran Paradiso.

== History ==
=== Early years ===
Rosa de Saron was formed in 1988 by Marcelo Machado (vocals), Alessandro (drums), Eduardo Faro (guitar), Alex Nozaki Mota (guitar), Rogério Feltrin (bass), and Eduardo Bortolato (keyboards), They initially played during masses and at the youth group in the Catholic community of Infant Jesus of Prague, in the Cambui neighborhood of Campinas, São Paulo. In 1994, they released their first album, Diante da Cruz, a mix of hard rock and heavy metal. After the album came out, Nozaki and Alessandro left the band, and Welington Greve (Grevão) took over on drums. In 1997, the band released their second album, Supreme Angústia.

In 1999, Machado left, and Guilherme de Sá was hired to replace him in 2001. A year later, Rosa de Saron released Depois do Inverno. In 2005 their Casa dos Espelhos album, produced by de Sá, was released. The album release took place at Hopi Hari and was supported by a series of concerts in Brazil.

The album Acústico, was released in 2007. To celebrate its 20 years in activity, on April 16, 2008, recorded their first DVD in Valinhos, Acústico e ao Vivo. In July of the same year, Feltrin published the book Rock, Faith and Poetry, which describes the band's first 20 years and each song.

=== Success ===
In January 2009, Som Livre began to distribute the DVD Acústico e ao Vivo, with significant distribution to the mainstream market. In December, Horizonte Distante was released. The album's resulted in the band's first Latin Grammy nomination in the category "Best Christian Music Album in Portuguese".

In September 2010, the band recorded their second live DVD, Horizonte Vivo Distante, at HSBC Brasil in São Paulo. The audience totaled more than 3,500 and counted on the participation of Mauricio Manieri on "Rara Calma". Both CD and DVD were certified gold by the Brazilian Association of the Producers of Discs (ABPD). It also received a Latin Grammy nomination.

In 2011, the band released their second EP, Siete Camiños. It contains seven of the band's songs: three in English and four in Spanish. The following year, the DVD Rosa na Estrada was released, a documentary produced by TV Século 21. The band also played at World Youth Day in Madrid in 2011. In May 2012, O Agora e o Eterno was released.

In 2013, they recorded their third live DVD Latitude, Longitude in Belo Horizonte.

The band performed during World Youth Day 2013 in Rio de Janeiro. de Sá and Feltrin participated in the Vigil and Mass of Shipment presided over by the Pope Francis. On 1 September 2013, Latitude, Longitude was performed in São Gonçalo, Rio de Janeiro, in the Rincão do Senhor. In 2014 the band released Cartas ao Remetente, the band's sixth project released by Som Livre.

On 8 July 2015, they recorded the fourth live DVD, Acústico e ao Vivo 2/3, together with Fábio de Melo, Lucas Lima and Jonathan Corrêa, in the Rede Século 21 studios in Valinhos.

On 17 April 2017 the program Casa da Rosa's debut was presented by the band members.

To commemorate the band's 30th anniversary, they released Gran Paradiso in February 2018. The publicity tour began in March of the same year and went through several Brazilian cities. Aparecida do Norte, a 30th-anniversary commemorative performance, was held on 14 July 2018. It was broadcast live nationally and by TV Aparecida in December.

In October 2018, de Sá announced his departure from the band. A farewell tour was announced and had shows until February 2019. In March 2019, the single "A Fênix" with new vocalist Bruno Faglioni was released.

== Members ==
=== Current members ===
- Rogério Feltrin: bass (1988–present)
- Eduardo Faro: lead and acoustic guitar (1990–present)
- Wellington Greve: drums (1995–present)
- Bruno Faglioni: vocals, acoustic guitar (2019–present)

=== Past members ===
- Alessandro: drums (1988–1995)
- Alex Nozaki: electric guitar (1990–1995)
- Eduardo Bortolatto: keyboards (1990–1998)
- Marcelo Machado: vocals (1988–2000)
- Guilherme de Sá: vocals, rhythm and acoustic guitar (2001–2019)

== Discography ==
=== Studio albums ===
- (1994) Diante da Cruz
- (1997) Angústia Suprema
- (2002) Depois do Inverno
- (2005) Casa dos Espelhos
- (2007) Acústico
- (2009) Horizonte Distante
- (2012) O Agora e o Eterno
- (2014) Cartas ao Remetente
- (2018) Gran Paradiso
- (2020) Lunação
- (2021) Baile das Máscaras
- (2026) Rua dos Regressos

=== Live albums ===
- (2008) Acústico e ao Vivo
- (2010) Horizonte Vivo Distante
- (2013) Latitude, Longitude
- (2015) Acústico e ao Vivo 2/3
- (2023) In Concert

=== Extended plays ===
- (1999) Olhando de Frente
- (2011) Siete Camiños

=== Greatest hits albums ===
- (2016) Essencial

=== Video albums ===
- (2008) Acústico e ao Vivo
- (2010) Horizonte Vivo Distante
- (2013) Latitude, Longitude
- (2015) Acústico e ao Vivo 2/3
- (2016) Essencial
- (2023) In Concert

== Books ==
- (2008) Rock, Faith and Poetry – 20 years of Rosa de Saron narrated through their music.
- (2016) Collectors of Stories

== Awards ==
- 2009 – Troféu Louvemos ao Senhor
  - Best band
  - Best singer (Guilherme de Sá)
  - Best song (Rara Calma)
- 2010 – Troféu Louvemos o Senhor
  - Best band
  - Best vocalist (Guilherme de Sá)
  - Best male performer (Guilherme de Sá)
  - Latin Grammy nomination for best Christian CD in Portuguese (Horizonte Distante)
- 2011 – Troféu Louvemos o Senhor
  - Best singer: Guilherme de Sá
  - Best guitarist: Eduardo Faro
  - Best bassist: Rogério Feltrin
  - Best drummer: Wellington Greve
- 2011 – Latin Grammy nomination as Best Christian CD in Portuguese (Horizonte Vivo Distante)
- 2013 – Troféu Louvemos o Senhor
  - Best band
  - Best rock album
- 2013 – Gold Album
  - By the CD O Agora e o Eterno
- 2014 – Troféu Louvemos o Senhor
  - Best DVD Burning: Latitude Longitude
  - Best DVD of the Year: Latitude Longitude
  - Best band singer: Guilherme de Sá
  - Best bassist: Rogério Feltrin
  - Best guitarist: Eduardo Faro
  - Best drummer: Wellington Greve
  - Best music of the year: Aurora
