= José Fernandes de Oliveira =

Brazilian priest, writer, and musician (born 1941)

Padre Zezinho
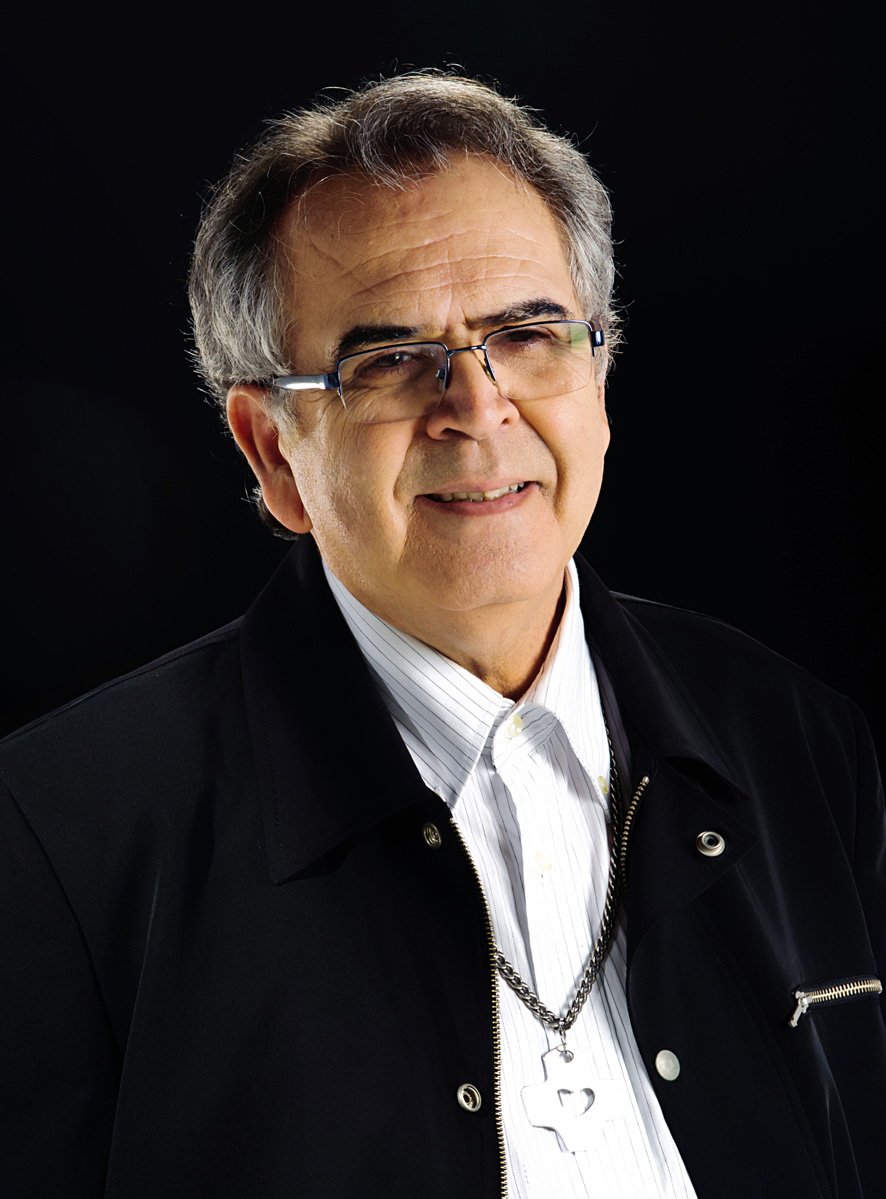

Personal life
- Born: José Fernandes de Oliveira; 8 June 1941 (age 85) Machado, Minas Gerais, Brazil

Religious life
- Religion: Roman Catholicism
- Order: SCJ
- Ordination: 21 September 1966

Military service
- Rank: Priest
- Website: http://www.padrezezinhoscj.blogspot.com/

Padre Zezinho
- Genres: Contemporary Catholic liturgical music, Contemporary Christian music
- Occupations: Singer, composer
- Instrument: Voice
- Years active: 1967–present
- Label: Paulinas COMEP

José Fernandes de Oliveira, SCJ, known as Padre Zezinho (born 8 June 1941), is a Dehonian priest, writer and Brazilian musician.

== Biography ==
His father was a violinist and he inherited his love by music. As a child, José Fernandes went to live with the priests, who assisted his family. Zezinho is the youngest of six siblings. When he was two years old, his family moved from Machado to Taubaté after his father had an accident and became paralyzed. At the age of eleven, he entered the seminary of the Dehonian Fathers.

Ordained a priest at 25 years old, on 21 September 1966 in the United States, he adopted in the following year, theater and music as means of evangelization and, in 1969, also the means of communication for this purpose.

== Career ==
Padre Zezinho is considered one of the biggest names in Christian music, and one of the pioneers in this musical genre. He began to compose in 1964 and began his singing career in 1967. In 1969, Zezinho recorded Song of Friendship (Shalom), his first compact, by Paulines COMEP. He was also a pioneer in the use of modern instruments such as electric guitar and drums in religious music.

Currently, Padre Zezinho presents a program on several Catholic Radio stations in Brazil, generated from São Paulo and titled "Words that do not pass". It also presents a program with the same name in TV Século XXI, of the Association of the Lord Jesus. He also recorded discs in more than five languages.

Some of his most famous songs are Um Certo Galileu, Maria de Nazaré, Amar Como Jesus Amou (gravado em Portugal por José Cid), Oração pela Família (versão para Portugal de Star Light e a dupla Nelo Silva e Cristiana), És Água Viva, Maria da Minha Infância, Alô Meu Deus, Ilumina, Ilumina, Estou Pensando em Deus, Utopia, Tua palavra, Senhor, Mãe do Céu Morena, Um Coração para Amar, Quando Jesus Passar, Cidadão do Infinito, Nova Geração, Minha Vida Tem Sentido, Daqui do Meu Lugar, De Lá do Interior, Palavra de Salvação, Cantiga Por um Ateu, Cantiga por Francisco, É Muito Jovem a Minha Oração, Mini Sermão, Ieshuá, Há um Barco Esquecido na Praia, Filho Pródigo, Vocação e Glória a Deus na Imensidão.

In 2010 his album Ao País dos Meus Sonhos was nominated for Best Christian Album (Portuguese Language) at the Latin Grammys.

In 2012 he suffered a stroke, which mainly affected his memory, leaving him with certain limitations of communication. Gradually he is resuming his activities, but under medical supervision, using the local anesthetic.

In 2014, he completed fifty years of evangelization.

== Discography ==
- 1972 - Estou Pensando em Deus
- 1973 - Canção para Meu Deus
- 1973 - Ágape: Músicas para Celebrações Eucarísticas
- 1974 - Histórias Que Eu Conto e Canto
- 1974 - Convívio: Músicas Para Encontros da Comunidade Cristã (Missa Ágape II)
- 1975 - Um Certo Galileu 1
- 1976 - Verdades
- 1977 - Teodicéia 1: Missa Maranathá
- 1977 - Teodicéia 2: Verdades Que Eu Rezo e Canto
- 1977 - Teodicéia 3: Cantigas de Dor e Esperança
- 1978 - Reviravolta
- 1978 - O Filho do Carpinteiro
- 1978 - Não Deixes que Eu Me Canse
- 1978 - À Sombra de Tuas Asas
- 1979 - Cantigas de Pão e Vinho
- 1980 - Quietude
- 1981 - Um Certo Galileu 2
- 1981 - Lá na Terra do Contrário
- 1982 - Qualquer Coisa de Novo
- 1983 - Oferenda
- 1984 - Coragem de Sonhar
- 1985 - Graça e Paz
- 1985 - Deus é Bonito!
- 1986 - Opereta Irmã Clara e Pai Francisco
- 1987 - Pra Ver a Paz Acontecer
- 1988 - Uma Canção Talvez
- 1989 - Sem Ódio e Sem Medo
- 1990 - Sol Nascente, Sol Poente
- 1991 - Canções Que o Amor Escreveu
- 1992 - Sereno e Forte
- 1993 - Canções para Quem não Reza
- 1994 - Ir ao Povo
- 1995 - Quando a Gente Encontra Deus
- 1996 - Canções Que a Fé Escreveu
- 1996 - Missa Fazedores da Paz
- 1997 - Canções Que a Vida Escreveu
- 1998 - Fortes na Fé
- 1998 - Canção para Meu Deus (Regravação)
- 1999 - Alpendres, Varandas e Lareiras 1
- 1999 - Alpendres, Varandas e Lareiras 2
- 2000 - Canções em Fé Maior
- 2000 - Criancices
- 2001 - Um Grito de Paz
- 2002 - Canções para o Sol Maior
- 2002 - Sereno e Forte (Remix 2002)
- 2003 - Ele Me Ungiu
- 2003 - Oremos pela Terra
- 2004 - Contemplativo / Quando Me Chamaste
- 2004 - Diante do Presépio
- 2006 - Canções Que a Família Escreveu
- 2007 - Manhãs Iluminadas
- 2008 - Deus É Muito Mais
- 2008 - Discípulos e Missionários
- 2008 - Cuida Bem da Palavra
- 2009 - Ao País dos Meus Sonhos
- 2009 - Coisas que Já Sei 1 (Disponível também em Versão Instrumental)
- 2010 - Mil Canções para Maria (PROCADE)
- 2011 - Quando Deus se calou (Disponível também em Versão Instrumental)
- 2011 - 45 anos de canção (Ao vivo)
- 2013 - Fez a paz acontecer
- 2013 - Ao vivo em Belém-PA
- 2014 - De Volta para o meu interior
- 2016 - Mil vezes Aparecida - o musical

== Published books ==
- 1971: Alicerce para um mundo novo (Ed. Paulinas)
- 1971: Gente como nós
- 1971: A juventude é uma parábola (Ed. Paulinas)
- 1971: Meu povo minha igreja (Ed. Paulinas)
- 1972: Um Cristo para os seus amigos (Ed. Paulinas)
- 1972: Os jovens estão rezando (Ed. Paulinas)
- 1972: Este rebelde quer ser padre (Ed. Paulinas)
- 1972: Cantiga de libertação (Ed. Paulinas)
- 1972: A revolta e a paz de Maria Helena (Ed. Paulinas)
- 1972: Meu mundo adolescente (Ed. Paulinas)
- 1972: Diga ao mundo que sou jovem (Ed. Paulinas)
- 1973: Um certo Jesus da Silva (Ed. Paulinas)
- 1973: O diálogo da vida (Ed. Paulinas)
- 1973: Uma jovem chamada Maria (Ed. Paulinas)
- 1973: Pastoral das vocações (Ed. Paulinas)
- 1973: A comunidade jovem (Ed. Paulinas)
- 1974: Ágape (Ed. Paulinas)
- 1974: Convívio – Quando Jessus passar (Ed. Paulinas)
- 1974: Esta menina está ficando Igreja (Ed. Paulinas)
- 1974: O Espírito sopra onde quer (Ed. Paulinas)
- 1974: Um jovem custa muito pouco (Ed. Paulinas)
- 1974: Jesus Cristo me deixou inquieto (Ed. Paulinas)
- 1974: A juventude agora (Ed. Paulinas)
- 1974: A pressa é inimiga do casamento (Ed. Paulinas)
- 1975: Meu Cristo jovem foi ficando adulto (Ed. Paulinas)
- 1975: Jesus falou e disse (Ed. Paulinas)
- 1975: Histórias que Jesus contava (Ed. Paulinas)
- 1975: Seu filho: Anjo ou demônio? (Ed. Paulinas)
- 1975: Os jovens em um minuto (Ed. Paulinas)
- 1975: Esta Igreja magnífica e seus leigos maravilhosos (Ed. Paulinas)
- 1976: Esta juventude magnífica e seus namoros nem sempre maravilhosos (Ed. Paulinas)
- 1976: Esquemas de perseverança Vol.01 (Ed. Paulinas)
- 1976: Esquemas de perseverança Vol.02 (Ed. Paulinas)
- 1976: Esquemas de perseverança Vol.03 (Ed. Paulinas)
- 1977: Ao meu Cristo adolescente (Ed. Paulinas)
- 1978: Não digas não a Deus (Ed. Paulinas)
- 1978: A Igreja dos cegos, dos surdos e dos mudos (Ed. Paulinas)
- 1978: Por causa de um certo Reino (Ed. Paulinas)
- 1978: Teatro jovem na Igreja (Ed. Paulinas)
- 1978: A Igreja do certo e do errado (Ed. Paulinas)
- 1978: Não deixes que eu me canse (Ed. Paulinas)
- 1980: O agitado coração adolescente (Ed. Paulinas)
- 1981: Rebeldes e inquietos em Jesus Cristo (Ed. Paulinas)
- 1982: Porque Deus me chamou... (Ed. Paulinas)
- 1982: Um coração que seja puro (Ed. Paulinas)
- 1982: O direito de ser jovem (Ed. Paulinas)
- 1982: Seu filho (guia para os pais) (Ed. Paulinas)
- 1982: Pastoral de Juventude (Ed. Paulinas)
- 1982: Senhor, que queres que eu faça? (Ed. Paulinas)
- 1982: A família em 1 minuto (Ed. Paulinas)
- 1982: Eduque seu filho para Deus (Ed. Santuário, Aparecida)
- 1983: Estou pensando em Deus (Ed. Santuário, Aparecida)
- 1983: O sexo que Deus lhe deu (Ed. Paulinas)
- 1983: Nós, os Católicos Romanos (Ed. Paulinas)
- 1984: Viver como Jesus viveu (Ed. Paulinas)
- 1984: Em paz com Deus e com a vida (Ed. Paulinas)
- 1984: O incômodo e magnífico Jesus de Nazeré (Ed. Paulinas)
- 1985: Desculpa Deus, ainda não sei rezar (Ed. Paulinas)
- 1985: Ensina-me a ser pobre de verdade (Ed. Paulinas)
- 1986: Três minutos de Juventude (Ed. Paulinas)
- 1987: A dor que dói na Juventude (Ed. Paulinas)
- 1988: Amizade talvez seja isso... (Ed. Paulinas)
- 1988: Essa dor que dói no mundo... (Ed. Paulinas)
- 1988: E Deus te quis mulher (Ed. Paulinas)
- 1989: A difícil arte de ser bom (Ed. Paulinas)
- 1989: A vocação de cada um (Ed. Paulinas)
- 1991: História de Simone (Ed. Paulinas)
- 1991: Oi, Deus! Meu nome é Zé (Ed. Paulinas)
- 1991: A geração insatisfeira (Ed. Paulinas)
- 1992: Há quem diga... Que o amor é um riacho... (Ed. Paulinas)
- 1995: Missa Ir ao Povo (Ed. Paulinas)
- 1996: Católicos pela graça de Deus (Ed. Paulinas)
- 1996: Em nome dos pais e dos filhos (Ed. Paulinas)
- 1996: Claro como a luz do dia (Ed. Paulinas)
- 1997: Tranquilamente Católico (Ed. Paulinas)
- 1997: Católicos serenos e felizes (Ed. Paulinas)
- 1999: Orar e pensar como família (Ed. Paulinas)
- 2002: Batizados e batizadores, O difícil caminho das águas (Ed. Paulinas)
- 2003: Apenas um rio que passa (Ed. Paulinas)
- 2003: Palavras que não passam (Ed. Paulinas)
- 2003: A fé humilde (Ed. Paulinas)
- 2003: O amor humilde (Ed. Paulinas)
- 2004: Novos púlpitos e novos pregadores (Ed. Paulinas)
- 2005: O Deus que achamos ter achado (Ed. Paulinas)
- 2006: Adolescentes em busca de algo mais (Ed. Paulinas)
- 2006: Adolescentes em busca de um porquê (Ed. Paulinas)
- 2007: Adolescentes em busca de si mesmos (Ed. Paulinas)
- 2007: De família sitiada à família situada (Ed. Paulinas)
- 2007: Do púlpito para as antenas, a difícil transição (Ed. Paulinas)
- 2007: Meu jeito de ser católico (Ed. Paulinas)
- 2008: Maria do jeito certo (Ed. Paulinas)
- 2009: De volta ao catolicismo (Ed. Paulinas)
- 2010: Um rosto para Jesus Cristo (Ed. Paulinas)
- 2011: João Leão Dehon, o profeta do verbo ir (Ed. Paulinas)
- 2012: Melhores filhos, melhores pais (Ed. Paulinas)
- 2012: Ser um entre bilhões (Ed. Paulinas)
- 2012: Juventude: Crises, cruzes e luzes (Ed. Paulinas)
- 2013: Pensar como jesus pensou (Ed. Paulinas)
- 2013: Chamados a cantar a Fé (Ed. Paulinas)
- N/D: Bem-aventurados os pacifistas (Ed. Paulinas)
- N/D: Dez poemas de paz inquieta (Ed. Paulinas)
- N/D: A paz é possível! (Ed. Paulinas)
- N/D: Jesus Cristo que também foi jovem... (Ed. Paulinas)

== See also ==
- Contemporary Catholic liturgical music
- Christian music
