= Cassiane =

Brazilian singer, born 1973

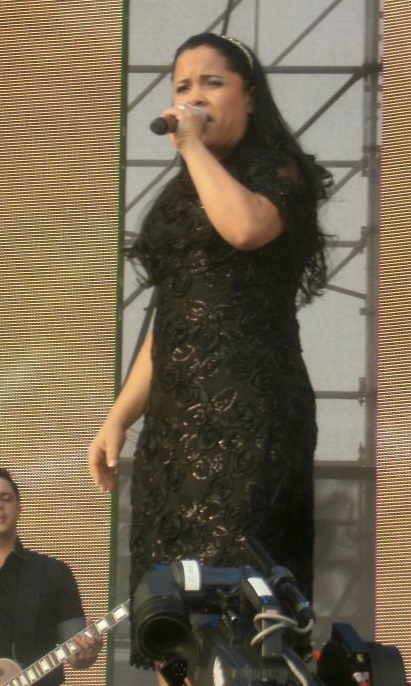
- Cassiane in 2012

Background information
- Born: Cassiane Santana Santos Manhães Guimarães; January 27, 1973 (age 53)
- Origin: Nova Iguaçu, RJ, Brazil
- Genres: Devotional music, Gospel music, Pentecostal music Pop music
- Occupations: Musician, singer-songwriter
- Instrument: Vocals
- Years active: 1981–present
- Labels: Reuel Music e Editora, Sony Music Gospel, MK Music.
- Website: www.cassiane.com

Cassiane Santana Santos Macnhães Guimarães (born January 27, 1973) is a Brazilian gospel singer, songwriter and Christian minister. She is known mononymously as Cassiane. She has been singing for over 40 years.

== History ==
Cassiane was born January 27, 1973. Cassiane was born in a Christian home in the municipality of Nova Iguaçu, Baixada Fluminense (RJ). At three years old she sang in worship with family support.

In 1981 the singer recorded her first album (an LP) at 8 years of age. She married in 1994 to Jairinho Manhães. They have 3 children, Jayane, Caius and Joshua. Cassiane Jairinho and recorded together for the album "Love You". Once residing in Ilha do Governador, Rio de Janeiro.

She has recorded 17 musical works including "No Words" - gold album (1996), "Forever" - platinum (1998), "With Much Praise" - Diamond Disc (1999 ), "Reward" disc platinaduplo (2001), "The Cure", platinum (2003), "Seeds of Faith" - disk platinaduplo (2006) and "Make a Difference" (2007).

In 2005, Cassiane was named the first pastor for her church. The singer was nominated in several categories at Promises Trophy in 2011, among them best song ("I shall"), Best CD (Viva) and best singer.

== Discography ==
=== Albums ===
| Title | Details |
|---|---|
| Cristo é a Força | Released: 1981; Label: Melodia Celeste; Format: LP |
| Dou Glória a Deus | Released: 1982; Label: Melodia Celeste; Format: LP |
| Rosa de Saron | Released: 1984; Label: Melodia Celeste; Format: LP, CD, K7 |
| Desafio | Released: 1987; Label: Som e Louvores; Format: LP, CD, K7 |
| União | Released: 1990; Label: Som e Louvores; Format: LP, CD, K7 |
| Atualidades | Released: 1992; Label: Independent; Format: LP, CD, K7 |
| Força Imensa | Released: October 31, 1993; Label: MK Music; Format: LP, CD, K7, download digital |
| Puro Amor | Released: 1994; Label: MK Music; Format: LP, CD, K7, download digital |
| Sem Palavras | Released: 1996; Label: MK Music; Format: CD, K7, download digital; Sales: 500,000 |
| Para Sempre | Released: 1998; Label: MK Music; Format: CD, K7, download digital; Sales: 600,000 |
| Com Muito Louvor | Released: December, 1999; Label: MK Music; Format: CD, K7, download digital; Sales: 2,000,000 |
| Recompensa | Released: September, 2001; Label: MK Music; Format: CD, download digital; Sales: 1,000,000 |
| A Cura | Released: September 5, 2003; Label: MK Music; Format: CD, download digital; Sales: 950,000 |
| Sementes da Fé | Released: September 23, 2005; Label: MK Music; Format: CD, download digital; Sales: 900,000 |
| Faça Diferença | Released: November, 2007; Label: Reuel Music; Format: CD, download digital; Sales: 500,000 |
| Harpa - Vol. 1 | Released: 2010; Label: Reuel Music; Format: CD, download digital; Sales: 100,000 |
| Viva | Released: July 26, 2010; Label: Sony Music; Format: CD, download digital; Sales: 250,000 |
| Ao Som dos Louvores | Released: September 19, 2011; Label: Sony Music; Format: CD, download digital; Sales: 150,000 |
| Um Espetáculo de Adoração | Released: March 15, 2013; Label: Sony Music; Format: CD, DVD; Sales: 40,000 |
| Harpa - Vol. 2 | Released: October, 2015; Label: MK Music; Format: CD, download digital; Sales: 10,000 |
| Eternamente | Released: November 16, 2015; Label: MK Music; Format: CD, download digital; Sales: 40,000 |
| Tempo de Excelência | Released: 2016; Label: MK Music; Format: CD, download digital; Sales: 25,000 |

=== Video albums ===
| Title | Details |
|---|---|
| Sem Palavras | Released: 1997; Label: MK Music; Format: DVD |
| Com Muito Louvor | Released: 2000; Label: MK Music; Format: DVD |
| 25 Anos de Muito Louvor | Released: 2006; Label: MK Music; Format: DVD |
| MK Clipes Collection Cassiane | Released: 2007; Label: MK Music; Format: DVD |
| Box edição de Colecionador 8 DVDs | Released: 2008; Label: Sony Music; Format: DVD |
| Harpa Cristã O recital | Released: 2010; Label: Reuel Music; Format: DVD |
| Bastidores Viva | Released: 2011; Label: Sony Music; Format: DVD |
| Um Espetáculo de Adoração - Ao Vivo | Released: March 15, 2013; Label: Sony Music; Format: CD, DVD |
