= Fábio de Melo =

Brazilian priest and musical artist

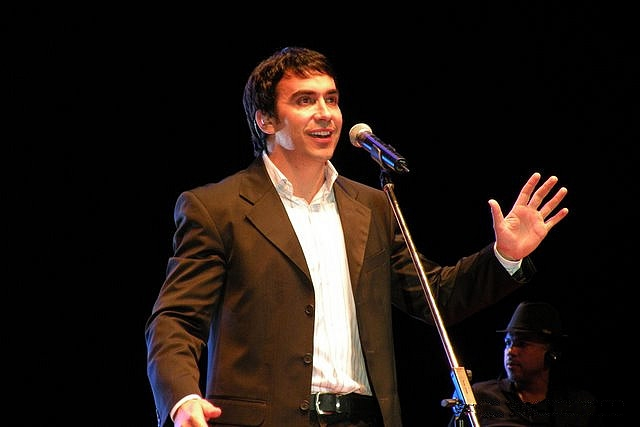

Personal life
- Born: Fábio José de Melo Silva; April 3, 1971 (age 55) Formiga, Minas Gerais, Brazil

Religious life
- Religion: Roman Catholicism
- Order: SCJ
- Ordination: December 15, 2001

Military service
- Rank: Priest
- Website: http://www.fabiodemelo.com.br/

Padre Fábio de Melo
- Genres: Contemporary Catholic liturgical music, Contemporary Christian music
- Occupations: singer, composer, poet, writer, teacher and presenter
- Instrument: Voice
- Years active: 1997 – present
- Labels: Sony Music; Som Livre; Canção Nova; Paulinas; LGK Music

Fábio José de Melo Silva, better known as Padre (Father) Fábio de Melo (April 3, 1971), is a Catholic priest, artist, writer, university professor and presenter. He belongs to the Congregation of the Priests of the Sacred Heart of Jesus. He acts in the Diocese of Taubaté, in the interior of the State of São Paulo. As a singer, he has recorded eight albums for the Paulinas-COMEP Catholic record label, one for the record company Canção Nova, an independent project. His first record for a secular record company, Vida, was released by LGK Music and by Som Livre, with whom he continues to record, having already released two more albums by the end of 2009. As a university professor, he taught theology at the Dehonian College of Taubaté. Nowadays, he presents the program Spiritual Direction, transmitted by TV Canção Nova.

== Biography ==
Father Fábio José de Melo Silva was born in the city of Formiga, Minas Gerais, on April 3, 1971. A master in theological anthropology, he was ordained in 2001 and works in the diocese of Taubaté, in the interior of São Paulo. He is the youngest of the eight children of the mason Dorinato Bias Silva and the housewife Ana Maria de Melo Silva.

== The priesthood ==
After 18 years of formation and studies in seminaries, with a final phase being frater in the seminary of St. Jude Tadeu of Terra Boa – Pr, on December 15, 2001, in his hometown, in the Mother Church of St. Vincent Ferrer, Fábio de Melo was ordained a priest by the consecratory prayer of the Church and by the imposition of the hands of the Metropolitan Archbishop of Palmas, Tocantins, Bishop Alberto Taveira Corrêa.

Father Mauricio Leão had a great influence on his life as a seminarian, leading him to the Lavras seminary. In his priestly life, he has as reference the priests Zezinho, Joãozinho, and Léo Tarcísio. He has also confessed of the influence of the Reverend Caio Fábio.

Father Fábio de Melo graduated from the Abílio Machado State School in Formiga (MG) and the second grade at the Nossa Senhora de Lourdes School in Lavras (MG). He holds a degree in theology from the Dehonian College of Taubaté, with a diploma from the Pontifical Catholic University of Rio de Janeiro and Philosophy at the Brusque Educational Foundation in Santa Catarina.

He received a post-graduate education in Rio de Janeiro and a master's degree in Belo Horizonte, together with the Jesuits, at Instituto Santo Inácio – ISI (FAJE: Faculdade Jesuíta de Filosofia e Teologia).

Fábio de Melo then returned to Taubaté to teach in the area of Fundamental and Systematic Theology, in the same college where he had graduated.

== Music career ==
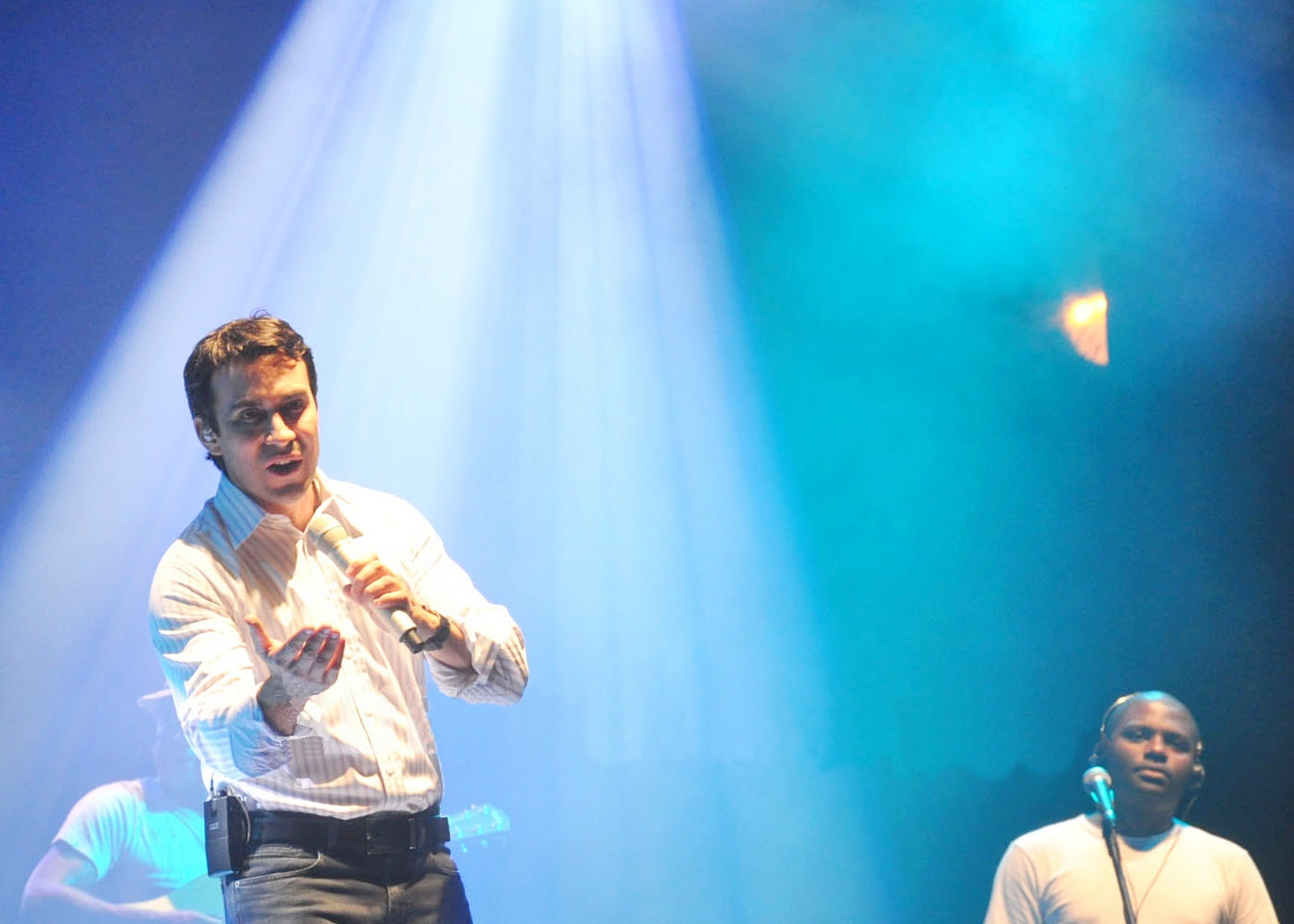
Fábio at a concert in 2011.

With reference to Father Zezinho, SCJ, precursor of the singer priests since the 1960s, Father Fábio de Melo released his first CD, in 1997, entitled De Deus um cantador. Following this, he released Saudades do Céu, with the participation of several Catholic artists, bringing together the singers of his congregation. Included in this CD was the song Sing Heart, a tribute to the Sacred Heart of Jesus.

Upon receiving diaconal ordination, he composed Seasons of Life, which would become the opening music of his live performances, especially after the release of the DVD Eu e o Tempo. Already an ordained priest, he brought to market his newest work in 2003, Marcas do Eterno.

In 2004, the album Tom de Minas was released, an independent project that honors names and places of his home state Minas Gerais, with the participation of popular singer and songwriter Paulinho Pedra Azul from a show in the capital, Belo Horizonte, under the name "Minas e Outros Tons".

The CD Humano Demais released in 2005 represented a return to his original themes, containing songs of his own and of other composers of catholic music.

In 2006, celebrating his 10 years of acting in Catholic music, several well-known songs known as "sertanjeas" were included in his 2006 release, in homage to his origins and his father, who also sang and played Viola.

The 2007 CD, Son of Heaven, first out of the Paulines and now for the New Song, tells of personal experiences and of those who have left, such as Father Léo Tarcísio, his trainer in seminary, and his great friend and singer-songwriter Robson Jr., of Cantores de Deus. Both were victims of cancer. Released the same year, the CD My Simple People retakes the idea already tried in "Zé Da Silva", with sertanejas, presenting those songs that were not originally recorded.

In 2008, Fábio de Melo released his first CD for the record company Som Livre – Vida – a work that made him known nationally, through the various participation in programs on open TV. Continuing his work of evangelism through the media, in 2009 he launched the CDs Iluminar and Eu e o Tempo. In 2014, he recorded Amar Como Jesus Amou, in a duet with singer Fernanda Takai, on her album Na Medida do Impossível.

== Discography ==
=== Released albums ===
Year	Title	Label	Sales	Certification
1997	De Deus um cantador	Paulinas-COMEP	—	—
1999	Saudades do céu	Paulinas-COMEP	—	—
2001	As Estações da Vida	Paulinas-COMEP	—	—
2003	Marcas do eterno	Paulinas-COMEP	—	—
2004	Tom de Minas	Independent	—	—
2005	Humano Demais	Paulinas-COMEP	100,000	Gold
2006	Sou um Zé da Silva e Outros Tantos	Paulinas-COMEP	50,000	Gold
2007	Filho do Céu	Canção Nova	100,000	Platinum
2007	Enredos do Meu Povo Simples	Paulinas-COMEP	50,000	Gold
2008	Vida	LGK Music, Som Livre	1,500,000	Diamond
2009	Iluminar	Som Livre	400,000	3× Platinum
2012	Estou aqui	Sony Music	100,000	Platinum
2014	Solo Sagrado	Sony Music	70,000	Gold
2015	Deus no Esconderijo do Verso	Sony Music	60,000	Gold
2017	Clareou	Sony Music	14,000	
2018	O Amor Me Elegeu	Canção Nova		

=== Live albums ===
Year	Title	Label	Sales	Certification
2009	Eu e o Tempo	LGK Music, Som Livre	350,000	3× Platinum
2010	Iluminar - Ao Vivo	Som Livre	200,000	2× Platinum
2011	No Meu Interior Tem Deus	Sony Music	200,000	2× Platinum
2013	Queremos Deus	Sony Music	50,000	Gold
2016	Deus no Esconderijo do Verso – Ao Vivo	Sony Music	40.000	—

=== DVDs ===
Year	Title	Label	Sales	Certification
2009	Eu e o Tempo	LGK Music, Som Livre	500,000	2× Diamond
2010	Iluminar - Ao Vivo	Som Livre	100,000	2× Platinum
2011	No Meu Interior Tem Deus	Sony Music	200,000	3× Platinum
2013	Queremos Deus	Sony Music	50,000	Platinum
2016	Deus no Esconderijo do Verso – Ao Vivo	Sony Music	20,000	—

=== Collecting ===
- 2000 – Canta Coração (Paulinas-COMEP)
- 2007 – Grandes Momentos (Paulinas-COMEP)
- 2008 – Coletânea Padre Fabio De Melo (LGK music, Som Livre)
- 2009 – Grandes Momentos 2 (Paulinas-COMEP)
- 2009 – Grandes Sucessos Vol.1 – Vários Artistas (Paulinas-COMEP)
- 2009 – Grandes Sucessos Vol.2 – Vários Artistas (Paulinas-COMEP)
- 2010 – Pe. Fábio de Melo – Coletânea Série Ouro – CD em comemoração dos 50 anos da Paulinas-COMEP (Paulinas-COMEP)

=== Parallel Projects ===
- 2007 – Brasil (Adriana, Pe. Fábio de Melo, Dunga, Martin Valverde e Migueli) (Solo Sagrado Produções e Eventos).
- 2007 – Enredados ao Vivo Vol. 2 – Enredados Brasil (Solo Sagrado Produções e Eventos)
- 2007 – DVD Enredados ao Vivo – Enredados Brasil (Solo Sagrado Produções e Eventos)

=== CD Participations ===
- 2004

– Diamante Lapidado – Celina Borges (track 6 "Bate Coração")

- 2005

– Mais Feliz – Adriana (track 12 – "Nossa Missão")

- 2007

– Adriana Ao Vivo – Adriana (track 12 – "Humano Amor de Deus")

- 2008

– Perseverar – Adrielle Lopes (track 6 – "Milagre")

- 2009

– Tudo Posso – Celina Borges (track 10 – "Lava-me")

– Coração sem abrigo – Andre Leonno (track 11 – "Contrários")

– Milagres – Adriana – (track 03 – "Milagres")

– Typ Vox – Typ Vox (track 10 – "Alma de Adorador")

- 2010

– Molda-me – Dalvimar Gallo (track 10 – "Volta pra Casa")

– Tudo Passa Pela Cruz – Olívia Ferreira (track 7 – "Cuidas de Mim")

– 30 Anos Ao vivo – Roupa Nova (track "A Paz")

- 2011

– 30 Anos – Paulinho Pedra Azul (track 3 – "Ave Cantadeira")

– Não Estou Sozinho – Banda Dominius & Ivete Sangalo – track 3 – "Não Estou Sozinho"

- 2014

– Na Medida do Impossível – Fernanda Takai (track 9 – "Amar Como Jesus Amou")

– Deserto – Iahweh (track 3 – "Deserto")

- 2016

– Quem é você? – Celina Borges (track 10 – "O Sol vai brlhar")

=== DVD participations ===
- 2007

– Adriana Ao Vivo – Adriana – (track 12 – "Humano Amor de Deus")

- 2010

– Raízes ao Vivo – Daniel – (track 11 – "Só o amor")

– Roupa Nova – 30 anos – Roupa Nova – (track 11 – "A Paz")

- 2011

Em Santidade – (Ministério Adoração e Vida) – (track 9 – "A esperança chegando")

- 2015

Acústico e ao Vivo 2/3 – (Banda Rosa de Saron) – (Casino Boulevard)

== Books ==
- 2006 – Tempo: saudades e esquecimentos – Paulinas-COMEP – ISBN 853560989X.
- 2007 – Amigo: somos muitos, mesmo sendo dois – Editora Gente – ISBN 978-85-7312-584-9.
- 2008 – Quem Me Roubou de Mim? – Canção Nova – ISBN 97-885-7677098-5.
- 2008 – Mulheres de aço e de flores – Gente – ISBN 97-885-7312610-5.
- 2008 – Quando o sofrimento bate a sua porta – Canção Nova – ISBN 97-885-7677122-7.
- 2009 – Cartas entre Amigos – sobre medos contemporaneous, com Gabriel Chalita – Ediouro – ISBN 97-885-6030302-1.
- 2009 – Mulheres Cheias de Graça – Ediouro – ISBN 9788500330223.
- 2010 – Cartas entre Amigos – sobre ganhar e perder, com Gabriel Chalita – Editora Globo – ISBN 8525048402.
- 2011 – O verso e a cena – Editora Globo
- 2011 – Tempo de Esperas – Editora Planeta
- 2012 – Orfandades – o destino das ausências – Editora Planeta
- 2013 – É Sagrado Viver – Editora Planeta
- 2014 – O Discípulo da Madrugada – Editora Planeta

== Awards ==
- 2009

– 1st Louvemos o Senhor Trophy

– Best Male Interpreter of 2008

– 2008 Highlights

- 2010

– Faustão's Melhores do Ano Trophy

– Best singer

– 2nd Louvemos o Senhor Trophy

– Best Male Interpreter of 2009

– 2009 Highlights

– Best Composer of 2009

– Best 2009 Song for Holy Mass for "Incendeia Minha Alma" – Composers: Rogério and Júlio Cesar

– Best Song of the Year for "Tudo é do Pai" – Composer: Frederico Cruz

2016

– Latin Grammy Award for Best Christian Album (Portuguese Language) (nominated)

2017

– Latin Grammy Award for Best Christian Album (Portuguese Language) (nominated)
