= Reginaldo Manzotti =

Padre Reginaldo Manzotti
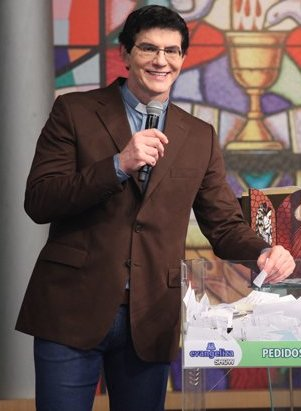

Personal life
- Born: Reginaldo Manzotti; 25 April 1969 (age 57) Paraíso do Norte, Paraná, Brazil

Religious life
- Religion: Roman Catholicism
- Ordination: 14 January 1995

Military service
- Rank: Priest
- Musical career
- Genres: Contemporary Catholic liturgical music, Contemporary Christian music
- Occupation: singer
- Instrument: Voice
- Years active: 1995–present
- Website: https://www.padrereginaldomanzotti.org.br/

Reginaldo Manzotti (25 April 1969) is a Catholic priest and Brazilian singer, also known as "The Father who gathers crowds", is a native of Paraíso do Norte, in the interior of Paraná. He was ordained a priest at the age of 25 and is currently parish priest of the Shrine of Our Lady of Guadalupe, in Curitiba – PR. He coordinates the Evangelizar é Preciso association, with thousands of members across the country.

For his gift of taking the divine word through music and the media, Father Reginaldo is requested by archdioceses and communities throughout Brazil to participate in evangelization movements, including non-Catholic movements; it is important to highlight that in all its events there is no cost to participate; the priest asks only for the collaboration of all to bring 1 kg of non-perishable food to give to the needy. In October 2011, in the IV Evangelize of Fortaleza, over one million four hundred thousand faithful were present. His official website receives almost one million hits per month.

== Biography ==
Father Reginaldo was born in Paraíso do Norte, in the northwestern municipality of the state of Paraná, the youngest of the six children of Percília Maria and Antônio Manzotti, through whom he descends from Italians.

Manzotti studied in his native city until he was eleven years old, when he joined the Carmelite Seminary of the Immaculate Conception of Graciosa, in Paranavaí. He graduated from San José Seminary in the same city. Later, in Curitiba, he studied Philosophy at the Vincentian Institute of Philosophy (later recognized by the University of São Paulo) and completed his baccalaureate in Theology by Studium Theologicum (recognizing this course by the Pontifical Lateran University of Rome). Soon after, he left for a year-long experience in the municipality of Camocim de São Félix, in the State of Pernambuco.

He received the presbyterate in his native city, on 14 January 1995, by the hands of Bishop Alberto Först, O.Carm., Bishop of Dourados.

In 1999, he sought Archbishop Pedro Antônio Fedalto to accept him in the Archdiocese of Curitiba. Dom Pedro resisted, at first, but yielded, with the endorsement of the Order of the Carmelites, and on 3 January 1999, he appointed him parish priest of St. Joseph of Vila Antonieta in Pinhais. After the three years of experience required by the Code of Canon Law and with the favorable opinion of the Presbyteral Council, Manzotti was lodged in the archdiocese on 19 March 2002, continuing in the same parish.

In 2003, he founded the association Evangelizar é Preciso, an evangelization movement. On 26 September 2005, Father Reginaldo Manzotti, at the invitation of the Colméia de Maringá radio station in Paraná, began to broadcast his "Experience of God" program by the Archdiocese of Maringá. From 2005, with the partnership of Rádio Colméia, the retransmission began with other partner radios, called "sister radios" that today goes beyond the 1500 stations.

On 5 February 2005, Archbishop Moacyr José Vitti transferred him to the Immaculate Conception Parish of Guabirotuba, where he was able to better develop his work as a communicator. Thanks to the generosity of Father Paulo Iubel, who proposed the exchange with his parish, Bishop Moacyr transferred Manzotti to the Parish of Our Lady of Guadalupe on 8 January 2006.

Today Father Reginaldo is the director of Radio Evangelizar, in which he himself presents a program of evangelization. He is also the director and coordinator of TV Evangelizar. His studio album Sinais do Sagrado reached sixth place in the TOP 20 ABPD. And the DVD "Creio no Deus do Impossível" was certified with Double Platinum Disc by ABPD, due to the more than 100 thousand copies sold in the country. Born in Paraíso do Norte (PR), Father Reginaldo Manzotti, known as the "Father who gathers crowds", is the coordinator of the Evangelizar é Preciso Association, a work of evangelization that has thousands of associates throughout Brazil. He is pastor of the Nossa Senhora de Guadalupe Church in Curitiba (PR) and daily shows TV and radio programs that are broadcast to various stations in the country.

Father Reginaldo is the author of books such as "10 Responses That Will Change Your Life," "20 Steps to Inner Peace," and "Mother of All, Mary."Paz Interior" e "Mãe de Todos, Maria". In 2011, he launched "Uma Oração Por Dia" and the following year "Minha Primeira Bíblia", adapted by him to the children. He also published the book "Feridas da Alma" with the aim of launching, through prayers and guidance, a little Divine Light on the shadows of human fragility.

In 2013, he released the CD "Faça Me Crer", which has special guest appearances, including names like Luan Santana and Neguinho da Beija-Flor. Also in the same year he was nominated with the CD Paz e Luz for the Latin Grammy in the category of Best Portuguese Christian Album.

His last studio album released, Tá Na Mão de Deus, was awarded on 20 April 2018.

In 2018, Father Reginaldo Manzotti in partnership with the pair Simone and Simaria, released the single Espalhar Amor. The song came to figure in the top 10 viral Spotify.

== Discography ==
=== Studio albums ===
- Deus é Presença Real (2003)
- No Poder da Oração (2005)
- A Tempestade Vai Passar (2007)
- Creio no Deus do Impossível (2008)
- Sinais do Sagrado (2010)
- Em Deus um Milagre (2011)
- Faça-Me Crer (2013)
- O Amor Restaura (2015)
- Entre amigos (2015)
- Momentos (2016)
- Tá Na Mão de Deus (2018)

=== Live albums ===
- Milhões de Vozes – Live in Fortaleza (2011)
- Paz e Luz (2012)
- Alma Missionária (2016)

== Books ==
- 2010 – 10 respostas que vão mudar sua vida
- 2010 – 20 Passos para a Paz Interior
- 2013 – Ser Cristão no dia a dia
- 2013 – Feridas da Alma
- 2013 – Milagres
- 2014 – A beleza de Deus está em toda parte
- 2015 – Manhã com Deus
- 2015 – Parábolas
- 2016 – Encontros
- 2017 – Batalha Espiritual: Entre anjos e demônios
- 2018 – Combate Espiritual no Dia a Dia
- 2019 – O Poder Oculto

== Awards and nominations ==
Year	Organization	Award	Nomination	Result	Reference
2013	Latin Grammy Award	Best Christian Album in Portuguese	Paz e Luz	Nominated	
