= List of Christian worship music artists =

This is a list of Christian worship music artists or bands. This list includes notable artists or bands that have recorded or been known to perform contemporary worship music at some point in their careers. This includes worship leaders, Christian songwriters, and contemporary Christian music artists. It is not a list of contemporary Christian music artists alone.

Bands are listed by the first letter in their name, excluding the words "a", "an", or "the", and individuals are listed by family name.

== Artists ==
=== A ===
- All Sons & Daughters
- Coffey Anderson
- Meredith Andrews
- Ascend the Hill
- Cory Asbury
- Audrey Assad
- Austin Stone Worship
- The Afters
- Yolanda Adams
- Avalon
- Andrew Ripp

=== B ===
- Josh Baldwin
- Paul Baloche
- Jon Bauer
- Marco Barrientos
- Francesca Battistelli
- Vicky Beeching
- The Belonging Co
- Bethel Music
- Big Daddy Weave
- Charles Billingsley
- Bluetree
- Dante Bowe
- Lincoln Brewster
- Bright City
- Brenton Brown
- Clint Brown
- Fernanda Brum
- Bryan & Katie Torwalt
- Building 429
- Bukas Palad Music Ministry
- Jon Buller

=== C ===
- Byron Cage
- Adam Cappa
- Caedmon's Call
- Adrienne Camp
- Jeremy Camp
- Carman (singer)
- Cody Carnes
- Steven Curtis Chapman
- Christ for the Nations Music
- The City Harmonic
- Citipointe Worship
- Citizens & Saints
- Consumed by Fire
- Amanda Cook
- Travis Cottrell
- Crowder
- David Crowder Band
- Casting Crowns
- Michael Card
- Citizen Way
- Christafari
- CAIN

=== D ===
- Lauren Daigle
- Hope Darst
- Diante do Trono
- Delirious?
- Desperation Band
- Jeff Deyo
- Disciple
- The Digital Age
- Kristene DiMarco
- Christine D'Clario
- Brian Doerksen
- Colton Dixon

=== E ===
- Samantha Ebert
- Elevation Worship
- Misty Edwards
- Darrell Evans

=== F ===
- Ludmila Ferber
- Lou Fellingham
- FFH
- Finding Favour
- Fireflight
- Don Francisco
- Brooke Fraser
- Austin French
- Marine Friesen
- For King & Country
- Jordan Feliz
- Forrest Frank

=== G ===
- Rob Galea
- Gateway Worship
- Maryanne J. George
- Keith Getty
- Aaron Gillespie
- Matt Gilman
- The Glorious Unseen
- Danny Gokey
- Steffany Gretzinger
- Keith Green
- Michael Gungor
- Amy Grant
- Steve Green
- Natalie Grant

=== H ===
- Deitrick Haddon
- Charlie Hall
- Fred Hammond
- Mark Harris
- Harvest
- Benjamin William Hastings
- Brandon Heath
- JJ Heller
- Hillsong United
- Hillsong Young & Free
- Hillsong Worship
- Israel Houghton
- Housefires
- Joel Houston
- Tim Hughes
- Koryn Hawthorne

=== J ===
- Jesus Culture
- Kari Jobe
- Brian Johnson
- Jenn Johnson
- Jimmy Needham
- Jonathan David & Melissa Helser
- Julissa
- Josiah Queen
- Jars Of Clay

=== K ===
- Glenn Kaiser
- The Katinas
- Graham Kendrick
- Dustin Kensrue
- Kings Kaleidoscope
- Kutless
- Ron Kenoly

=== L ===
- Brandon Lake
- Tasha Layton
- Lenny LeBlanc
- Leeland
- Crystal Lewis
- Brian Littrell
- Loud Harp
- The LUKAS Band
- LIFE Worship
- Tasha Cobbs Leonard
- Rachel Lampa

=== M ===
- Matthew West
- Matt Maher
- Mandisa
- Maranatha! Singers
- Robin Mark
- William Matthews
- Maverick City Music
- The McClures
- Heath McNease
- MercyMe
- Don Moen
- Danilo Montero
- Chandler Moore
- Mosaic MSC
- Molly Kate Kestner
- Shawn McDonald
- Nicole C. Mullen

=== N ===
- Ana Nóbrega
- Christy Nockels
- Katy Nichole
- needtobreathe
- Newsboys
- NewSong
- NewSpring Worship
- New Life Worship

=== O ===
- One Sonic Society
- Fernando Ortega
- The O.C. Supertones
- Stacie Orrico
- Ginny Owens

=== P ===
- Parachute Band
- Twila Paris
- Andy Park
- Laura Hackett Park
- Sandi Patty
- Alexis Peña
- Charlie Peacock
- Andrew Peterson
- Petra
- PFR
- Phatfish
- David Phelps
- Phillips, Craig and Dean
- Planetboom
- Planetshakers
- Point of Grace
- Matt Price
- Kevin Prosch

=== Q ===
- Chris Quilala
- Josiah Queen

=== R ===
- Naomi Raine
- Matt Redman
- Rend Collective
- Jeremy Riddle
- Gabriela Rocha
- Rock n Roll Worship Circus
- Jesus Adrian Romero
- Noel Richards
- Jon Reddick
- Andrew Ripp

=== S ===
- Israel Salazar
- Nívea Soares
- Torrey Salter
- Sanctus Real
- Juliano Son
- Rebecca St. James
- Kathryn Scott
- Seeker & Servant
- Seventh Day Slumber
- Beckah Shae
- Shane & Shane
- Aaron Shust
- Sidewalk Prophets
- Manfred Siebald
- Sinach
- Sixteen Cities
- Skillet
- Chris Sligh
- Martin Smith
- Michael W. Smith
- Sonicflood
- Starfield
- Laura Story
- Stryper
- Switchfoot
- Sons Of Sunday
- Sovereign Grace Music
- Ryan Stevenson
- Kristian Stanfill

=== T ===
- Tenth Avenue North
- Third Day
- Chris Tomlin
- Stuart Townend
- Hunter G. K. Thompson
- Jon Thurlow
- Randy Travis
- Tribl
- TobyMac
- Tauren Wells
- Tree 63
- Micah Tyler

=== U ===
- United Pursuit
- Jason Upton

=== V ===
- Ana Paula Valadão
- André Valadão
- Mariana Valadão
- Jaci Velasquez
- Vertical Church Band
- Victory Worship

=== W ===
- Kim Walker-Smith
- Tommy Walker
- John Waller
- Watermark
- Wayne Watson
- Waterdeep
- We Are Messengers
- Steven Welch
- Evan Wickham
- Phil Wickham
- Paul Wilbur
- Kelly Willard
- Zach Williams
- Josh Wilson
- Marcos Witt
- Worth Dying For
- CeCe Winans
- Anne Wilson
- We The Kingdom
- Worship Central
- Rhett Walker
- Matthew West

=== Y ===
- Young Oceans

=== Z ===
- Darlene Zschech

== See also ==
- List of Christian bands and artists by genre
