= Diante do Trono discography =

Diante do Trono's discography consists of live albums and studio albums. The band has sold over 15 million albums in a variety of formats.

== Albums ==
=== Diante do Trono series (Live) ===
Year	Album informations
1998	Diante do Trono: Place of recording: Lagoinha Church, Belo Horizonte, MG (7.000 people present); Date of recording: 31 January; Released: 1998; Labels: Diante do Trono; Format: CD, DVD, K7, Playback, VHS & digital download; Duration: 72:09 (CD) e 87:50 (DVD & VHS); Sales: 680.000 (CD); Certifications: 2× Platinum (CD) Golden (DVD)
1999	Exaltado: Place of recording: Lagoinha Church, Belo Horizonte, MG (7.000 people present); Date of recording: 13 February; Released: 2000; Labels: Diante do Trono; Format: CD, DVD, K7, VHS & digital download; Duration: 72:32 (CD) e 89:36 (DVD & VHS); Sales: 500.000 (CD); Certifications: 2× Platinum (CD) Golden (DVD)
2000	Águas Purificadoras: Place of recording: Gameleira Park, Belo Horizonte, MG (70.000 people present); Date of recording: 15 July; Released: 2000; Labels: Diante do Trono; Format: CD, DVD, Playback, VHS & digital download; Duration: 73:08 (CD) e 90:12 (DVD e VHS); Sales: 1.500.000 (CD); Certifications: Diamond (CD) Golden (DVD)
2001	Preciso de Ti: Place of recording: Mineirão Stadium, Belo Horizonte, MG (210.000 people present); Date of recording: 14 July; Released: 2001; Labels: Diante do Trono; Format: CD, DVD, Playback, VHS & digital download; Duration: 73:04 (CD) e 96:25 (DVD & VHS); Sales: 2.000.000 (CD); Certifications: 2× Diamond (CD) Platinum (DVD)
2002	Nos Braços do Pai: Place of recording: Monumental Axis, Brasília, DF (1.200.000 people present); Date of recording: 13 July; Released: 2002; Labels: Diante do Trono; Format: CD, DVD, Playback, VHS & digital download; Duration: 73:39 (CD) e 196:59 (DVD & VHS); Sales: 1.200.000 (CD) 250.000 (DVD); Certifications: Diamond (CD) 2× Diamond (DVD)
2003	Quero Me Apaixonar: Place of recording: Campo de Marte Airport, São Paulo, SP (2.000.000 people present); Date of recording: 12 July; Released: 2003; Labels: Diante do Trono; Format: CD, DVD, Playback, VHS & digital download; Duration: 74:02 (CD) e 122:15 (DVD & VHS); Sales: 1.000.000 (CD) 170.000 (DVD); Certifications: 3× Platinum (CD) Diamond (DVD)
2004	Esperança: Place of recording: Bahia Administrative Center, Salvador, Bahia (1.200.000 people present); Date of recording: 10 July; Released: 2004; Labels: Diante do Trono; Format: CD, DVD, Playback, VHS & digital download; Duration: 73:40 (CD) e 123:08 (DVD & VHS); Sales: 700.000 (CD) 190.000 (DVD); Certifications: Diamond (CD) Diamond (DVD)
2005	Ainda Existe Uma Cruz: Place of recording: Margins of Guaíba River, Porto Alegre, RS (300.000 people present); Date of recording: 9 July; Released: 2005; Labels: Diante do Trono; Format: CD, DVD, Playback, VHS & digital download; Duration: 72:41 (CD) e 122:39 (DVD & VHS); Sales: 500.000 (CD) 95.000 (DVD); Certifications: Platinum (CD) Diamond (DVD)
2006	Por Amor de Ti, Oh Brasil: Place of recording: Yamada Arena, Belém, PA (90.000 people present); Date of recording: 15 July; Released: 2006; Labels: Diante do Trono (Label)|o; Format: CD, DVD, Playback & digital download; Duration: 73:29 (CD) e 123:02 (DVD); Sales: 300.000 (CD) 60.000 (DVD); Certifications: 3× Platinum (CD) Platinum (DVD)
2007	Príncipe da Paz: Place of recording: Apoteose Square, Rio de Janeiro, RJ (100.000 people present); Date of recording: 7 July; Released: 2007; Labels: Diante do Trono; Format: CD, DVD, Playback & digital download; Duration: 72:56 (CD) e 121:48 (DVD); Sales: 370.000 (CD) 74.000 (DVD); Certifications: Platinum (CD) Platinum (DVD)
2008	A Canção do Amor: Place of recording: Chevrolet Hall, Recife, PE (45.000 people present); Date of recording: 4, 5 July; Released: 2008; Labels: Diante do Trono; Format: CD, DVD, Playback & digital download; Duration: 73:47 (CD) e 110:30 (DVD); Sales: 150.000 (CD) 53.000 (DVD); Certifications: Platinum (CD) Platinum (DVD)
2009	Tua Visão: Place of recording: Station Square, Belo Horizonte, MG (50.000 people present); Date of recording: 1 August; Released: 30 September 2009; Labels: Som Livre e Diante do Trono; Format: CD, DVD, Playback & digital download; Duration: 71:31 (CD) e 114:52 (DVD); Sales: 200.000 (CD) 77.000 (DVD); Certifications: Platinum (CD) Platinum (DVD)
2010	Aleluia: Place of recording: Parque do Peão, Barretos, SP (60.000 people present); Date of recording: 17 July; Released: 17 September 2010; Labels: Som Livre e Diante do Trono; Format: CD, DVD, Playback, Blu-ray & digital download; Duration: 71:45 (CD) e 129:28 (DVD & Blu-ray); Sales: 250.000 (CD) 110.000 (DVD); Certifications: 3× Platinum (CD) 2× Platinum (DVD)
2011	Sol da Justiça: Place of recording: Beach of Meio & Riachuelo Theater, Natal (Rio Grande do Norte)|Natal, RN (120.000 e 2.500 people present); Date of recording: 16, 18 July; Released: 18 September de 2011; Labels: Som Livre e Diante do Trono; Format: CD, DVD, Playback, Blu-ray & digital download; Duration: 73:57 (CD), 71:48 e 117:29 (DVD & Blu-ray); Sales: 130.000 (CD) 81.000 (DVD); Certifications: Platinum (CD) Platinum (DVD)
2012	Creio: Place of recording: Sambadrome, Manaus, AM (350.000 people present); Date of recording: 9 June; Released: 25 September 2012; Labels: Som Livre e Diante do Trono; Format: CD, Playback, DVD, Blu-ray & digital download; Duration: 73:40 (CD) e 117:47 (DVD & Blu-ray); Sales: 150.000 (CD) 82.000 (DVD); Certifications: Platinum (CD) Platinum (DVD)
2014	Tu Reinas: Place of recording: Events Park Padre Cícero, Juazeiro do Norte, CE (50.000 people present); Date of recording: 6 July 2013; Released: 1 October de 2014; Labels: Diante do Trono; Format: CD, DVD & digital download; Duration: 72:13 (CD) e 120:00 (DVD); Sales: 70.000 (CD) 40.000 (DVD); Certifications: Golden (CD)
2015	Tetelestai: Place of recording: Tower of David, Garden of the Empty Tomb & Mount of Olives, Jerusalem, Israel (557 people present); Date of recording: 13, 14, 15 May 2014; Released: 2015; Labels: Diante do Trono; Format: CD, DVD & digital download; Duration: 71:08 (CD); Sales: 60.000 (CD) 20.000 (DVD); Certifications: Golden (CD)
2017	Deserto de Revelação: Place of recording: Amman, Jerash, Petra, Little Petra, Wadi Rum & Sea of Galilee, Jordan & Israel (270 people present); Date of recording: 14, 15, 16 June 2017; Released: 2017; Labels: Diante do Trono & Onimusic; Format: CD & digital download; Duration: 62:75 (CD); Sales: Certifications:

=== Another live albums ===
Year	Album informations
2000	Aclame ao Senhor: Place of recording: Lagoinha Church, Belo Horizonte, MG (7.000 people present); Date of recording: 19 July; Released: 2000; Labels: Hosanna! Music; Format: CD, & VHS; Duration: 53:28 (CD) e 60:09 (DVD & VHS); Sales: Certifications:
2000	Shalom Jerusalém: Place of recording: Lagoinha Church, Belo Horizonte, MG (7.000 people present); Date of recording: 5 August; Released: 2000; Labels: Hosanna! Music; Format: CD; Duration: 70:19 (CD); Sales: Certifications:
2001	Brasil Diante do Trono: Place of recording: Maracanã Stadium, Rio de Janeiro, RJ (180.000 people present); Date of recording: 1 December; Released: 2002; Labels: Diante do Trono; Format: CD & VHS; Duration: 65:46 (CD 1), 60:00 (CD 2) e 89:24 (VHS); Sales: 500.000 (CD); Certifications: 2× Platinum (CD)
2007	Tempo de Festa: 10 Years: Place of recording: Via Funchal, São Paulo, SP (7.000 people present); Date of recording: 9, 10 March; Released: 2007; Labels: Diante do Trono; Format: CD, DVD & digital download; Duration: 61:33 (CD 1), 59:33 (CD 2) e 185:00 (DVD); Sales: 200.000 (CD) 60.000 (DVD); Certifications: 2× Platinum (CD) Platinum (DVD)
2007	Com Intensidade: 10 Years: Place of recording: Mineirinho Stadium, Belo Horizonte, MG (13.000 people present); Date of recording: 16 April; Released: 2008; Labels: Diante do Trono (Label)|o; Format: CD, DVD & digital download; Duration: 71:26 (CD) e 130:00 (DVD); Sales: 50.000 (CD) 40.000 (DVD); Certifications: Golden (CD) Golden (DVD)
2011	Glória a Deus: Place of recording: Lagoinha Church, Belo Horizonte, MG (6.000 people present); Date of recording: 22 April; Released: 2012; Labels: Som Livre & Diante do Trono; Format: CD & digital download; Duration: 73:55 (CD); Sales: 100.000 (CD); Certifications: Platinum (CD)
2013	Renovo: 15 Years: Place of recording: Expominas, Belo Horizonte, MG (12.000 people present); Date of recording: 29 March; Released: 8 June 2013; Labels: Som Livre & Diante do Trono; Format: CD & digital download; Duration: 74:22 (CD); Sales: 75.000 (CD); Certifications: Golden (CD)
2015	Deus Reina: Place of recording: Lagoinha Church, Belo Horizonte, MG (6.000 people present); Date of recording: 12 August 2014; Released: 2015; Labels: Onimusic; Format: CD & digital download; Duration: 59:14 (CD); Sales: 20.000 (CD); Certifications:
2016	Pra Sempre Teu: Place of recording: Lagoinha Church, Belo Horizonte, MG (6.000 people present); Date of recording: 1 September 2015; Released: 23 June 2016; Labels: Onimusic; Format: CD & digital download; Duration: 72:72 (CD); Sales: Certifications:
2016	Imersão: Place of recording: Life Fellowship Church, McKinney, United States; Date of recording: 8 October 2016; Released: November 2016; Labels: Onimusic; Format: CD & digital download; Duration: Sales: 30.000 (CD); Certifications:
2016	Muralhas: Place of recording: Biblical Church of Peace, São Paulo, SP; Date of recording: 23 June 2016; Released: 17 April 2017; Labels: Onimusic; Format: CD & digital download; Duration: 61:04 (CD); Sales: Certifications:
2017	Imersão 2: Place of recording: Lagoinha Church, Belo Horizonte, MG (7.000 people present); Date of recording: 13 April 2017; Released: 4 August 2017; Labels: Onimusic; Format: CD & digital download; Duration: 67:13 (CD); Sales: Certifications:

=== Crianças Diante do Trono albums ===
Year	Album informations
2001	Crianças Diante do Trono: Released: 2002; Labels: Diante do Trono; Format: CD, Playback, DVD, VHS & digital download; Duration: 59:29 (CD) e 62:31 (DVD & VHS); Sales: 500.000 (CD) 150.000 (DVD); Certifications: Platinum (CD) Diamond (DVD)
2003	Amigo de Deus: Released: 2003; Labels: Diante do Trono; Format: CD, Playback, DVD, VHS & digital download; Duration: 48:55 (CD) e 52:27 (DVD & VHS); Sales: 250.000 (CD) 100.000 (DVD); Certifications: Platinum (CD) Diamond (DVD)
2004	Quem é Jesus?: Released: 2004; Labels: Diante do Trono; Format: CD, Playback, DVD, VHS & digital download; Duration: 55:42 (CD) e 53:07 (DVD & VHS); Sales: 350.000 (CD) 250.000 (DVD); Certifications: 3× Platinum (CD) Diamond (DVD)
2005	Vamos Compartilhar: Released: 2005; Labels: Diante do Trono; Format: CD, Playback, DVD & digital download; Duration: 52:21 (CD) e 52:24 (DVD); Sales: 150.000 (CD) 120.000 (DVD); Certifications: Platinum (CD) Diamond (DVD)
2006	A Arca de Noé: Released: 2006; Labels: Diante do Trono; Format: CD, Playback, DVD & digital download; Duration: 50:57 (CD) e 50:42 (DVD); Sales: 200.000 (CD) 250.000 (DVD); Certifications: Platinum (CD) Diamond (DVD)
2007	Samuel, o Menino que Ouviu Deus: Released: 2007; Labels: Diante do Trono; Format: CD, Playback, DVD & digital download; Duration: 48:41 (CD) e 49:13 (DVD); Sales: 125.000 (CD) 120.000 (DVD); Certifications: Platinum (CD) 2× Platinum (DVD)
2008	Para Adorar ao Senhor: Released: 2008; Labels: Diante do Trono; Format: CD, DVD & digital download; Duration: 47:39 (CD) e 110:00 (DVD); Sales: 50.000 (CD) 60.000 (DVD); Certifications: Golden (CD) Platinum (DVD)
2010	Amigos do Perdão: Released: 2010; Labels: Som Livre e Diante do Trono; Format: CD, DVD & digital download; Duration: 43:58 (CD) e 110:00 (DVD); Sales: 100.000 (CD) 130.000 (DVD); Certifications: Platinum (CD) 2× Platinum (DVD)
2012	Davi: Released: 25 September 2012; Labels: Som Livre e Diante do Trono; Format: CD, Playback, DVD, Blu-ray & digital download; Duration: 53:07 (CD) e 54:47 (DVD); Sales: 60.000 (CD) 52.000 (DVD); Certifications: Golden (CD) Platinum (DVD)
2015	Renovo Kids: Released: 9 October 2015; Labels: Onimusic; Format: CD; Duration: 69:00 (CD); Sales: 5.000 (CD); Certifications:
2016	DT Babies: Released: 30 September 2016; Labels: Onimusic; Format: CD; Duration: Sales: 2.000 (CD); Certifications:

=== Studio albums ===
Year	Album informations
2006	En los Brazos del Padre: Released: 2006; Labels: Diante do Trono; Format: CD; Duration: 70:58 (CD); Sales: Certifications:
2006	In the Father's Arms: Released: 2006; Labels: Diante do Trono; Format: CD; Duration: 71:06 (CD); Sales: Certifications:
2012	Global Project: Português: Released: 18 September de 2012; Labels: CanZion Brasil; Format: CD & digital download; Duration: 66:46 (CD); Sales: 70.000 (CD); Certifications: Golden (CD)

=== Instrumental ===
Year	Album informations
2006	Sem Palavras: Released: 2006; Labels: Diante do Trono; Format: CD, DVD & digital download; Duration: 44:52 (CD) e 57:41 (DVD)

=== Ana Paula Valadão solo albums ===
Year	Album informations
2009	As Fontes do Amor: Released: 2009; Labels: Diante do Trono; Format: CD & Playback; Duration: 61:52 (CD); Sales: 100.000 (CD); Certifications: Golden (CD)

=== CTMDT albums ===
Year	Album informations
2006	Viver por Ti: Place of recording: Centro de Treinamento Ministerial Diante do Trono, Santa Luzia, MG (???? people present); Date of recording: 18 November 2006; Released: 2006; Labels: Diante do Trono; Format: CD & DVD; Duration: 68:30 (CD) e 88:37 (DVD)
2009	Não Haverá Limites: Place of recording: Baptist Central Church, Belo Horizonte, MG (???? people present); Date of recording: 18 October 2009; Released: 2009; Labels: Diante do Trono; Format: CD & DVD; Duration: 62:50 (CD) e 77:57 (DVD)
2012	Tu És Tudo Pra Mim: Place of recording: Centro de Treinamento Ministerial Diante do Trono's Auditory, Belo Horizonte, MG (???? people present); Date of recording: 31 October 2010; Released: 2012; Labels: Diante do Trono; Format: digital download; Duration: 67:17 (Digital download)
2017	Dependente: Place of recording: Date of recording: Released: 2017; Labels: Format: digital download; Duration:

=== Nations Before The Throne ===
Year	Album informations
2012	Suomi Valtaistuimen Edessä: Idiom: Finnish; Released: November 2012; Labels: Missiokustannus; Format: CD & digital download; Duration: 65:12 (CD)
2014	Läpimurto: Idiom: Finnish; Released: 2 July 2014; Labels: Missiokustannus; Format: CD & digital download; Duration: 76:51 (CD)
2015	Deutschland Vor Dem Thron: Idiom: German; Released: 15 December 2015; Labels: Diante do Trono; Format: CD & digital download; Duration: (CD)

== See also ==
- Ana Paula Valadão
- Lagoinha Church

== Sources ==
- https://www.lojadiantedotrono.com
