= Alexis Peña =

Alexis Peña may refer to:

- Alexis Peña (Venezuelan footballer) (born 1956), Venezuelan football forward
- Alexis Peña (singer) (born 1984), Colombian Christian music, singer, songwriter, worship leader, pastor, and author
- Alexis Peña (Mexican footballer) (born 1996), Mexican football centre-back
