= Valadas =

Valadas is a surname. Notable people with the surname include:

- Alfredo Valadas (1912–1994), Portuguese footballer
- Francisco Valadas (1906–?), Portuguese equestrian

== See also ==
- Valadao
- Valadas Occitanas, Valley of Italy
