= Eugene Mirman Comedy Festival =

The Eugene Mirman Comedy Festival was a stand-up comedy festival, that ran from 2008 until 2017 at the Bell House and Union Hall in Brooklyn created by Eugene Mirman and featured comedians from the alt-comedy community. In the 2019 documentary, It Started As a Joke, Mike Birbiglia told the audience how Mirman pitched Birbiglia and Julie Smith Chen, saying "I have this idea. What if we made a festival that's just making fun of other festivals?"

== History ==
The Eugene Mirman Comedy Festival was a reaction to the large scale comedy festivals such as Just For Laughs. Mirman said, "I just thought it was really funny. Then I was like, I’m not really going to do that, because it’s like a combination of ridiculous and self-aggrandizing" and Birbiglia and Smith Chen convinced him to do it. Mirman and Smith Chen booked the Bell House and its sister club, Union Hall, and invited their friends to come do the first festival in 2008, mostly comics from the alt-scene as well as musicians. Shows had titles such as "We Appreciate Ourselves: The Five Year Anniversary Celebration of the Eugene Mirman Comedy Festival," "This is the Night These Comics Get Discovered and Become Stars!," and "Uh Oh: Dangerous, Inappropriate Comedy for Teenagers, A Comedy Show for Sexually Active Teens* Or Families that Don’t Feel Too Weird if Adult Subject Matter is Discussed (*Teens Don’t Actually Have to be Sexually Active, In Fact, It’s Better if You Wait ‘Til Sophomore Year of College.)" It had VIP areas with titles "VIP Herring room,” with different kinds of untouched herring displayed. The stand-up was real, featuring Jim Gaffigan, Janeane Garofalo, Sarah Silverman and other established comics.

In addition to the comedy on stage, festival goers could do a staring context, or talk to a therapist in a bouncy castle, or play Connect Four with a dermatologist. In 2011, started a Kickstarter to help raise funds for the festival.

Mirman ended the festival after ten years, telling Jessie Thorn on Maximum Fun, "The reason we kept doing it was because it was enjoyable and then the reason we stopped is because it wasn’t exactly feasible." So many of the comics, including Mirman, had moved out of New York City. It had become logistically as well as cost-challenging. When Mirman ended EMCF, it was replaced by the Janelle James Comedy Festival in 2018.

The documentary about the EMCF, It Started As a Joke... premiered at SXSW in 2020. It was directed by Julie Smith Clem and Ken Druckerman and featured Aparna Nancherla, Bobcat Goldthwait, Daniel Kitson, H. Jon Benjamin, Janeane Garofolo, Jim Gaffigan, Jo Firestone, Jon Glaser, John Oliver, Kristen Schaal, Kumail Nanjiani, Mike Birbiglia, Michael Ian Black, Michael Showalter, Reggie Watts, Wyatt Cenac as well as Mirman and his wife, Katie Westfall-Tharp.

== Entertainers featured ==
The ECMF ran for ten years. The following is a list of the performers that appeared over its run.

2008: Eugene Mirman Comedy Festival

- Andrea Rosen, Andy Blitz, Arj Barker, Aziz Ansari, Bobby Tisdale, Chelsea Peretti, Craig Baldo, Dave Hill, David Wain, Fred Armisen, Gary Gulman, Greg Johnson, Hannibal Burress, Heather Lawless, Ira Glass, Janeane Garofalo, Joe Wong, Les Savvy Fav, Matt Price, Michael Showalter, John Mulaney, John Roberts, Katty Bisone, Larry Murphy, Leo Allen, Marc Maron, Mehran Khaghani, Morgan Murphy, Rick Canavan, Ron Lynch, Sam Seder, Seth Herzog, Shonali Bhowmilk, Tig Notaro

2009: Eugene Mirman Comedy Festival

- A. D. Miles, Bobby Tisdale, Brent Sullivan, Brett Gelman, Daniel Kitson, Eric Slovin, Hannibal Buress, John Hodgman, John Mulaney, Jon Auer (of The Posies), Jon Benjamin, Kirsten Schaal, Kumail Nanjiani, Larry Murphy, Leo Allen, Marc Maron, Max Silvestri, Michael Showalter, Patrick Borelli, Pete Holmes, Reggie Watts, Seth Herzog, Tim & Eric, Todd Barry, Tony V., Zak Orth

2010: Eugene Mirman Comedy Festival

- A.D. Miles, Brent Sullivan, Bobby Tisdale, Colson Whitehead, Dan St. Germain, Daniel Kitson, Darin Strauss, David Cross, Emo Philips, Eric Slovin, Glenn Wool, Greg Johnson, Hannibal Buress, Jon Benjamin, John Mulaney, John Oliver, John Wesley Harding, Jon Glaser, Ken Reid, Kristen Schaal, Kumail Nanjiani, Kurt Braunohler, Larry Murphy, Leo Allen, Maeve Higgins, Marc Maron, Max Silvestri, Michael Showalter, Mike Birbiglia, Mike Lawrence, Patrick Borelli, Reggie Watts, Ron Lynch, Sarah Vowell, Tony V., William Graham, Yo La Tengo

2011: Eugene Mirman Comedy Festival

- Adam Reed, Aisha Tyler, Alan Alda, Amber Nash, Brent Sullivan, Chris Parnell, Elna Baker, Ira Glass, Jane Borden, Jen Kirkman, Jena Friedman, Jessica Walter, John Hodgman, John Oliver, Jon Glaser, Kristen Schaal, Kurt Braunohler, Lamont Price, Leo Allen, Lucky Yates, Matt Thompson, Neil deGrasse Tyson, Rachel Maddow, Rick Jenkins, Ron Funches, Sarah Vowell, Scott Adsit, Tom Allen, Tom Shillue

2012: Eugene Mirman Comedy Festival

- Ben Kronberg, Brendon Small, Brent Sullivan, Brooke Van Poppelen, Daniel Kitson Dr. David Grinspoon, Damien Lemon, Elna Baker, Jacqueline Novak, Jared Logan, Jim Gaffigan, John Mulaney, Jon Glaser, Kevin Townley, Matt McCarthy, Michael Che, Neil DeGrasse Tyson, Nick Turner, Sarah Silverman, Todd Barry, Tom Shillue

2013: Eugene Mirman Comedy Festival

- Adam Newman, Bobby Tisdale, Claudia Cogan, Dan St Germain, Ira Glass, Jena Friedman, Jim Gaffigan, Jim Tews, Jon Benjamin, Jon Glaser, Josh Gondelman, Kate Berlant, Kristen Schaal, Kurt Braunohler, Leo Allen, Mehran Khaghani, Michael Che, Monica Bill Barnes and Anna Bass, Neil deGrasse Tyson, Nick Turner, Sean Donnelly, Seaton Smith, Wyatt Cenac

2014: Eugene Mirman Comedy Festival

- Bill Nye, Bridget Everett, Chris Duffy, Elna Baker, Dave Hill, Derrick Brown, Elna Baker, Emily Maya Mills, H. Jon Benjamin, Jessi Klein, Jon Glaser, Kevin Townley, Maeve Higgins, Mehran Khaghani, Michael Che, Michelle Wolf, Neil deGrasse Tyson, Nick Thune, Robyn Hitchcock, Wyatt Cenac

2015: Eugene Mirman Comedy Festival

- AC Newman & Eleanor Friedberger, Amy Schumer, Bill Nye, Chris Duffy, Dan Boulger, Ira Glass, Janeane Garofalo, Jessi Klein, Jessica Williams, Jo Firestone, John Mulaney, John Oliver, Josh Gondelman, Jon Benjamin, Jon Glaser, Jon Spencer & Cristina Martinez, Ken Reid, Louis CK, Maeve Higgins, Phoebe Robinson, Reggie Watts, Scott Adsit, Stephin Merritt of Magnetic Fields, Wyatt Cenac

,2016: Eugene Mirman Comedy Festival

- Aaron Glaser, Al Park, Ahmed Bharoocha,Aparna Nancherla, Ashley Brooke Roberts, Caroline Rhea, Chris Duffy, Eliot Glazer, Ilana Glazer, Jo Firestone, John Mulaney, Jon Glaser, Josh Gondelman, Micheal Che, Neil deGrasse Tyson, Nick Kroll, Phil Kaye, Sasheer Zamata, Shalewa Sharpe, Steve Macone

2017: 10th Eugene Mirman Comedy Festival

- Aparna Nancherla, Bennett Ferris, Bryan Brinkman, Bob Goldthwait, Blythe Roberson, Caroline Rhea, Casey James Salengo, Chris Duffy, Derrick Brown, Eliot Glazer, Emily Flake, Emmy Blotnick, Harris Mayersohn, Ian Fidance, Jo Firestone, Joel Kim Booster, Jon Glaser, Josie Long, Julio Torres, Kyle Ayers, Madelyn Freed, Maeve Higgins, Mike Birbiglia, Neil deGrasse Tyson, Ophira Eisenberg, Phoebe Angle, Robyn Hitchcock, Roy Wood Jr., Sarah Vowell, Seth Herzog, Tanael Joachim, Will Winner, Wyatt Cenac
