= Valadao =

Valadao or Valadão is a surname. Notable people with the surname include:

- Ana Paula Valadão (born 1976), Brazilian singer
- André Valadão (born 1978), Brazilian singer
- Mariana Valadão (born 1984), Brazilian singer
- Márcio Valadão (born 1947), Brazilian pastor
- David Valadao (born 1977), American politician
