= Steven Welch =

- Born: Steven Lloyd Welch
- Origin: Springfield, Missouri
- Genres: Worship, Christian pop
- Occupations: Singer, songwriter, worship leader, pastor
- Instrument: Vocals
- Years active: 2011–present
- Labels: Dream
- Website: stevenwelchmusic.com

Steven Lloyd Welch is an American Christian musician, worship leader, and pastor, who primarily plays Christian pop and contemporary worship music. He has released one solo album, Color of Love, in 2012, with Dream Records.

== Early and personal life ==
Steven Lloyd Welch, the son of Stan, a pastor, and Sherry Lynn Welch, who is the older brother to Sumer, who is his sister. He was formerly the worship leader at James River Assembly in Springfield, Missouri, while he eventually left to take a position with Eastridge Church in Issaquah, Washington. His wife is Danina, and they have children together.

== Music career ==
His professional music career started in 2011, with the recording, Color of Love, that was released on September 18, 2012, from Dream Records.

== Discography ==
Albums

- Color of Love (September 18, 2012, Dream)
