= A Canção do Amor =

Live album by Diante do Trono
- Released: 2008
- Recorded: 4 and 5 July 2008, Chevrolet Hall, Recife, Pernambuco, Brazil (45,000 people present)
- Genre: Contemporary worship music
- Length: 73:47 (CD) and 110:30 (DVD)
- Label: Diante do Trono
- Producer: Diante do Trono

Diante do Trono Live Praise & Worship chronology
Príncipe da Paz (2007)	A Canção do Amor (2008)	Tua Visão (2009)

A Canção do Amor is the eleventh album in the live praise and worship series of Contemporary worship music by Diante do Trono.

== About the project ==
In the pre-recording of the A Canção do Amor, the mining group released the Príncipe da Paz album, recorded at the Apoteose Square, in Rio de Janeiro.

The album was recorded at Chevrolet Hall in Recife, Pernambuco, on 4 and 5 July 2008.

All songs were composed by Ana Paula Valadão.

The album sold about 150,000 copies in Brazil so getting the platinum disc charted hits in churches throughout Brazil as "Confio Em Teu Amor" and "A Canção do Amor".

== Track listings ==
=== CD ===
Song	Author	Worship Leader	Duration
Saudades	Ana Paula Valadão	Ana Paula Valadão	6:21
Desperta	Ana Paula Valadão	Ana Paula Valadão	6:03
Pela Manhã	Ana Paula Valadão	Ana Paula Valadão	4:38
Com Júbilo Eu Canto	Ana Paula Valadão	André Valadão	9:23
Confio Em Teu Amor	Ana Paula Valadão	Ana Paula Valadão	7:05
O Teu Amor	Ana Paula Valadão	Ana Paula Valadão, Helena Tannure & Soraya F. Gomes	6:22
Pelo Teu Amor	Ana Paula Valadão	Ana Paula Valadão	6:49
A Canção do Amor	Ana Paula Valadão	Ana Paula Valadão	8:33
Porque Te Amo	Ana Paula Valadão	Ana Paula Valadão	5:34
Espontâneo	Ana Paula Valadão	Ana Paula Valadão	5:45
Minha Herança	Ana Paula Valadão	Ana Paula Valadão	6:58

=== DVD ===
Song	Worship Leader
Desperta	Ana Paula Valadão
Pela Manhã	Ana Paula Valadão
Com Júbilo Eu Canto	André Valadão
Espontâneo 1	Ana Paula Valadão
Confio Em Teu Amor	Ana Paula Valadão
O Teu Amor	Ana Paula Valadão, Helena Tannure & Soraya F. Gomes
Espontâneo 2	Ana Paula Valadão
Pelo Teu Amor	Ana Paula Valadão
Deuteronômio 11	Ana Paula Valadão
A Canção do Amor	Ana Paula Valadão
Espontâneo 3	Ana Paula Valadão
Porque Te Amo	Ana Paula Valadão
Espontâneo 4	Ana Paula Valadão
Oásis	Mariana Valadão & Marine Friesen
Minha Herança	Ana Paula Valadão
