= Rede Super =

Brazilian broadcast television network

- Type: Religious broadcasting
- Country: Brazil
- Availability: National (broadcast, cable, satellite); Worldwide (satellite)
- Founded: 2000 by Márcio Valadão
- Headquarters: Belo Horizonte, Brazil
- Owner: Lagoinha Church
- Key people: Márcio Valadão (founder); André Valadão (president)
- Launch date: July 2000 (25 years ago)
- Former names: Rede de Televisão Comunitária
- Picture format: 480i (SDTV); 1080i (HDTV)
- Webcast: Watch Live
- Official website: redesuper.com.br
- Language: Portuguese

Rede Super (English: Super Network) is a Brazilian evangelical Christian-based religious broadcast television network that is owned by the Lagoinha Church, founded by Márcio Valadão in 2000. Rede Super is headquartered in Belo Horizonte, Brazil.

== History ==
In May 1997, journalists Alberico de Sousa Cruz and Lauro Diniz founded the Rede de Televisão Comunitária of the journalistic genre, broadcast by channel 21 UHF. In 2000, the sale of the Rede de Televisão Comunitária to the Lagoinha Church was carried out, being transformed into Rede Super. After the sale, the first broadcasts of the channel on pay TV was by NET and later came with the satellite signal covering greater coverage. On July 17, 2002, the church acquired the local cable channel and began broadcasting 24 hours of evangelical programming.

Since 2001, the Rede Super transmits all the general rehearsals of Diante do Trono, worship services and events of Lagoinha, as well as the congresses that the church and the band organize in Belo Horizonte, beginning with the general rehearsal of the recording of the album Preciso de Ti. That year the station inaugurates its first branch in Juiz de Fora.

In 2008, Rede Super began to be managed by the group Diante do Trono, the largest praise group in Brazil and Latin America. During that period, the station adopted the slogan "Rede Super: restoring lives" and later, "Rede Super: a TV before the Throne".

On February 22, 2010, pastor André Valadão assumed the presidency of the Rede Super. With the new management, Alex Passos, who since 2002 presents the program Balaio, took over the executive board of the station. In November of the following year, the station gained its own headquarters. The facilities moved from the Lourdes neighborhood in Belo Horizonte to the São Luiz neighborhood in the Pampulha region.

In February 2015, the Rede Super started to broadcast its programming on channel 32 UHF. That year Rede Super also stopped having Via Brasil TV as an affiliate. On August 2, the station is no longer broadcast on channel 21.

== Controversies ==
There were rumors that the Rede Super would switch channels with the Novo Tempo TV, which would be transmitted by channel 32 UHF and the Rede Super would return to channel 21 UHF to enter the digital signal.

ANATEL gave a deadline until February 2016 for the Rede Super to enter the digital signal or else it would be disconnected along with the analog signal, although it is being generated in Belo Horizonte. The deadline was extended to November 2017. As a result, on March 28, 2017, Rede Super, through Lagoinha, began the campaign "The Rede Super can not Stop", in which R$3 million was sought for digitalization of the network signal and disconnection of the analogic signal in Belo Horizonte, under the closing sentence of the broadcaster. On the same night of launch, at least R$60,000 in donations were collected. Before the deadline, the amount of R$3 million was collected and the Rede Super transmits today normally in channel 32.1 in Belo Horizonte.

== Programming ==
Current programs

- Amplificador
- Cristo Vivo
- De Tudo Um Pouco
- Os Gideões
- Mente Aberta
- Profetizando Vida
- Sempre Feliz
- Tio Uli e os Bonecos

Past programs

- Balaio
- Diante do Trono
- Display
- EsclareSer
- Esquadrão do Lar
- Fé
- Impacto Vida
- Loucos Por Respostas
- Noite & Cia
- Nos Bastidores com o DT
- Novo de Novo
- Nunca Pare de Lutar
- Resgatados
- Santa Geração
- Sexta Básica
- Só Vai Melhorar
- Super Bastidores
- UP
