= Príncipe da Paz =

Live album by Diante do Trono
- Released: 2007
- Recorded: 7 July 2007, Apoteose Square, Rio de Janeiro, Rio de Janeiro, Brazil (100,000 people present)
- Genre: Contemporary worship music
- Length: 72:56 (CD) and 121:48 (DVD)
- Label: Diante do Trono
- Producer: Diante do Trono

Diante do Trono Live Praise & Worship chronology
Por Amor de Ti, Oh Brasil (2006)	Príncipe da Paz (2007)	A Canção do Amor (2008)

Príncipe da Paz is the tenth album in the live praise and worship series of contemporary worship music by Diante do Trono.

== Background ==
In the pre-recording of the Príncipe da Paz, the mining group released the Por Amor de Ti, Oh Brasil album, recorded at the Yamada Arena, in Belém.

Recorded on a symbolic day 7/7/7 date (the number 7 in the Bible is God's number, the number of perfection), the album was recorded at the Sambadrome of Rio de Janeiro, where the carnival is held, with more than 100 thousand present.

The work sold over 370,000 copies and received a gold disc symbol, from the NovoDisc.

== Track listings ==
=== CD ===
Song	Author	Worship leader	Length
Música do Céu	Ana Paula Valadão	Ana Paula Valadão	5:33
Mais Que Vencedor	Ana Paula Valadão	Ana Paula Valadão	4:40
Mais Que Vencedor (Reprise)	Ana Paula Valadão	Ana Paula Valadão	2:43
Debaixo dos Nossos Pés	Ana Paula Valadão	André Valadão	4:21
Cordeiro e Leão	Ana Paula Valadão	Ana Paula Valadão	6:43
Príncipe da Paz	Ana Paula Valadão	Ana Paula Valadão	6:18
Corpo de Cristo	Ana Paula Valadão	Ana Paula Valadão	6:51
Espírito de Vida	Ana Paula Valadão	Ana Paula Valadão	7:30
Autor da Vida	Ana Paula Valadão	Ana Paula Valadão	5:51
Tudo Vem de Ti	Ana Paula Valadão	Ana Paula Valadão	7:30
Tua Glória	Ana Paula Valadão	Ana Paula Valadão & Soraya F. Gomes	6:13
Salmo 90	Ana Paula Valadão	Ana Paula Valadão	6:15
Aleluia de Handel	Georg Friedrich Händel	Ana Paula Valadão, André Valadão & Nívea Soares	2:23

=== DVD ===
Song	Worship leader
Música do Céu	Ana Paula Valadão
Mais Que Vencedor	Ana Paula Valadão
Espontâneo 1	Ana Paula Valadão
Debaixo dos Nossos Pés	André Valadão
Espontâneo 2	André Valadão
Cordeiro e Leão	Ana Paula Valadão
Espontâneo Intercessão	Ana Paula Valadão
Príncipe da Paz	Ana Paula Valadão
Corpo de Cristo	Ana Paula Valadão
Espírito de Vida	Ana Paula Valadão
Autor da Vida	Ana Paula Valadão
Tudo Vem de Ti	Ana Paula Valadão
Tua Glória	Ana Paula Valadão & Soraya F. Gomes
Salmo 90	Ana Paula Valadão
Aleluia de Handel	Ana Paula Valadão, André Valadão & Nívea Soares
