= Robin Mark =

Northern Irish Christian musical artist (born 1957)

- Born: 1957 (age 68–69)
- Origin: Belfast, Northern Ireland, United Kingdom
- Genre: Contemporary Christian
- Occupations: Singer, musician, songwriter
- Instruments: Vocals, piano, acoustic guitar
- Years active: 1990–present
- Website: robinmark.com

Robin Mark (born 1957) is a Northern Irish Christian singer, songwriter, worship leader, and recording artist based in Belfast, Northern Ireland. Mark may be known best for "Days of Elijah", "Revival", "Jesus, All for Jesus", "The Wonder of The Cross", and "Not by Might" amongst the many songs he has written and which are sung throughout the world. He has released thirteen albums in total, with sales of over two million worldwide, and has won the GMA's international award.

Though known within the United Kingdom and throughout Canada and Europe from the early 1990s, it was not until his 1999 live album Revival in Belfast that Mark became known well in the United States, Australia, and the rest of the world. His signature song, "Days of Elijah", has proven popular since 1996.

Mark's album Revival in Belfast, released in 1999, remained high in both the Christian retail charts and Billboard charts for many years. It was still at No. 39 on the Billboard Top Christian Albums chart in 2004. When the follow-up album, Come Heal This Land, was released in 2001, it went straight to No. 1 in the Christian Retail Charts in the United States. Robin became the first artist from the UK to accomplish this feat.

Robin Mark is also the worship leader in his home church, Christian Fellowship Church (CFC) in East Belfast.

== Discography ==
Studio recordings

- Captive Heart (1990)
- Not By Might (1993)
- Days of Elijah (1996)
- This City, These Streets (1998)
- Sanctuary (2000)
- Songs & Hymns (2005)
- East of the River (2007)
- John Wesley & Co. (2012)
- Liberation Praise (2014)
- The Great Hurricane (2016)

Live recordings

- Room for Grace (1997)
- Mandate – All for Jesus (1999)
- Revival in Belfast (1999)
- Mandate – Men of Faith (2001)
- Come Heal This Land (2001)
- Mandate: Experiencing God (2003)
- Revival in Belfast 2 (2004)
- Arise: A Celebration of Worship (2006)
- Mandate 2007: Living the Adventure (2008)
- Year of Grace (2009)
- Fly (2011)
- A Belfast Symphony (2018)

Compilations

- Days of Elijah (The Worship Songs of Robin Mark) (2006)
- All for Jesus: Songs and Hymns (2010)
- Ultimate Collection (2013)
