= Diante do Trono (album) =

Live album by Diante do Trono
- Released: 1998
- Recorded: 31 January 1998, Lagoinha Baptist Church, Belo Horizonte, Minas Gerais, Brazil (7,000 people present)
- Genre: Contemporary worship music
- Length: 72:09 (CD) and 87:50 (DVD & VHS)
- Label: Diante do Trono
- Producer: Diante do Trono

Diante do Trono Live Praise & Worship chronology
Diante do Trono (1998)	Exaltado (1999)

Diante do Trono is the first album in the live praise and worship series of contemporary worship music by Diante do Trono.

== About the Project ==
In 1995, the pastor Márcio Valadão, father of Ana Paula and Sérgio Gomes, conductor of the Church, decided to make a record, whose income would serve to combat child prostitution that they saw on a trip to India.

In 1997 the city of Belo Horizonte, in the Lagoinha Baptist Church, under the leadership of Ana Paula Valadão is formed a group of praise and worship, which until then had no name.

In 1998 a group of musicians from the Lagoinha Baptist Church, in Belo Horizonte, met to record the songs sung in the community. With five versions of American composers and six authorship of the group, under the leadership of Ana Paula Valadão, CD Diante do Trono church took shape in the temple itself. For two hours, 7,000 people sang and danced, creating a new trend and legitimizing a new concept of music in the Christian community.

The material for the album was recorded on January 31, 1998, a cult of the Lagoinha Baptist Church. Along with Ana Paula, the vocals were formed by singers like André Valadão, his brother, and Nívea Soares.

A few months after recording the musical work was released, especially the song "Diante do Trono". With the positive impact of the song, the group, which until then had no official name, became known Diante do Trono. Besides this, other songs of the set were also very popular on the radio, especially "Aclame ao Senhor", "Deus de Amor" and "Manancial".

The repertoire of the album contains versioned songs (such as "Te Agradeço" [written by Dennis Jernigan ] and "Aclame ao Senhor" [written by Darlene Zschech ] and unreleased songs (such as "A Quem Temerei?" And "Diante do Trono", which gives name to the album). versions and unreleased songs are all authored by Ana Paula Valadão.

== Track listing (CD) ==
Song	Author	Worship Leader	Duration
Quero Celebrar	Dennis Jernigan (version of Ana Paula Valadão)	Ana Paula Valadão	3:45
A Quem Temerei?	Ana Paula Valadão	Ana Paula Valadão	4:24
Não Temas	Ana Paula Valadão	Ana Paula Valadão	4:06
Me Libertou	Ana Paula Valadão	André Valadão	3:53
Se Renovam	Ana Paula Valadão	Ana Paula Valadão	5:16
Te Agradeço	Dennis Jernigan (version of Ana Paula Valadão)	Ana Paula Valadão	5:05
Deus de Amor	Ana Paula Valadão	Ana Paula Valadão	6:36
Manancial	Ana Paula Valadão	Ana Paula Valadão & André Valadão	8:13
Aclame ao Senhor	Darlene Zschech (version of Ana Paula Valadão)	Nívea Soares, Erica Costa & Soraya F. Gomes	7:35
Diante do Trono	Ana Paula Valadão	Ana Paula Valadão	8:28
Quão Grande és Tu	Shannon Fogal Wexelberg (version of Ana Paula Valadão)	Soraya F. Gomes	7:42
Adoramos o Cordeiro	Dennis Jernigan (version of Ana Paula Valadão)	Ana Paula Valadão	7:04

== Track listing (DVD) ==
Song	Worship Leader
Quero Celebrar	Ana Paula Valadão
A Quem Temerei?	Ana Paula Valadão
Não Temas	Ana Paula Valadão
Me Libertou	André Valadão
Se Renovam	Ana Paula Valadão
Te Agradeço	Ana Paula Valadão
Deus de Amor	Ana Paula Valadão
Manancial	Ana Paula Valadão & André Valadão
Aclame ao Senhor	Nívea Soares, Erica Costa & Soraya F. Gomes
Diante do Trono	Ana Paula Valadão
Quão Grande és Tu	Soraya F. Gomes
Adoramos o Cordeiro	Ana Paula Valadão
