= Esperança (album) =

Live album by Diante do Trono
- Released: 2004
- Recorded: 10 July 2004
- Venue: Administrative Center of Bahia, Salvador, Bahia, Brazil
- Genre: Contemporary worship music
- Length: 73:40
- Label: Diante do Trono
- Producer: Diante do Trono

Diante do Trono Live Praise & Worship chronology
| Quero Me Apaixonar (2003) | Esperança (2004) | Ainda Existe Uma Cruz (2005) |

Esperança is the seventh Portuguese-language album in the live praise and worship series of contemporary worship music by Diante do Trono.

== About the project ==
In the pre-recording of the Esperança, the mining group released the Quero Me Apaixonar album, recorded at the Campo de Marte Airport, in São Paulo.

The group once again reaffirmed its intention to hold large gatherings of worshipers in their recordings when this brought, according to the Civil Police, an audience of about 1,200,000 people. The album sold over 650,000 copies, charting successes in churches throughout Brazil as "Eis-me Aqui" and "Esperança" (theme song).

By Talent Trophy 2005, the Esperança album won the awards for Best CD and Best Praise and Worship CD of the Year, the ministry Diante do Trono was awarded as Group of the Year.

== Track listings ==
=== CD ===
| Song | Songwriter | Worship leader | Length |
|---|---|---|---|
| "Quem é deus Como o Nosso Deus?" | Ana Paula Valadão | Ana Paula Valadão | 6:29 |
| "Descanso em Deus" | Ana Paula Valadão | Ana Paula Valadão | 6:21 |
| "A Cada Manhã" | Ana Paula Valadão | Ana Paula Valadão | 4:22 |
| "Tua Presença" | Ana Paula Valadão | Ana Paula Valadão | 5:47 |
| "Quando a Tempestade Vem" | Ana Paula Valadão | Helena Tannure, Graziela Santos, Maximiliano Moraes | 4:40 |
| "Esperança" | Ana Paula Valadão | Ana Paula Valadão | 7:24 |
| "Meu Filho, Não Temas" | Ana Paula Valadão | André Valadão | 11:37 |
| "Eis-me Aqui" | Ana Paula Valadão | Ana Paula Valadão | 8:22 |
| "Isaías 53" | Ana Paula Valadão | Ana Paula Valadão | 5:48 |
| "Tu és a Minha Coroa" | Ana Paula Valadão | Nívea Soares | 6:56 |
| "Salvador" | Ana Paula Valadão | Ana Paula Valadão | 5:49 |

=== DVD ===
| Song | Worship leader |
|---|---|
| "Salmos 115" | Nena Lacerda |
| "Quem é deus Como o Nosso Deus?" | Ana Paula Valadão |
| "Palavra-Descanso" | Ana Paula Valadão |
| "Descanso em Deus" | Ana Paula Valadão |
| "A Cada Manhã" | Ana Paula Valadão |
| "Tua Presença" | Ana Paula Valadão |
| "Quando a Tempestade Vem" | Helena Tannure, Graziela Santos, Maximiliano Moraes |
| "Palavra-Esperança" | Ana Paula Valadão |
| "Esperança" | Ana Paula Valadão |
| "Meu Filho, Não Temas" | André Valadão |
| "Eis-me Aqui" | Ana Paula Valadão |
| "Isaías 53" | Ana Paula Valadão |
| "Clamor Pela Nação" | Ana Paula Valadão |
| "Espontâneo" | Ana Paula Valadão |
| "Tu és a Minha Coroa" | Nívea Soares |
| "Salvador" | Ana Paula Valadão |
