= Samantha Ebert =

Canadian Christian singer-songwriter

- Born: Ottawa, Ontario, Canada
- Genres: Contemporary Christian music
- Occupation: Singer-songwriter
- Instrument: Vocals
- Years active: 2018–present
- Labels: Sounds Good Music; Virgin Music Group
- Website: samanthaebertmusic.com

Samantha Ebert is a Canadian Christian singer and songwriter.

== Career ==
Ebert began writing songs in 2015 and later started sharing her music on social media. In 2024, she independently released her third single "Flowers". The song later charted on Billboard's Christian Airplay chart and amassed over 60 million global streams.

Following the success of "Flowers", Ebert signed with Sounds Good Music, in partnership with Virgin Music Group. and released a version of "Flowers" featuring Seph Schlueter.

Eberts follow up single "Overthinking" amassed over 10 million streams. She later released "No One Knows". "Forty One" and "Questions".

Her music is characterized by faith-centered themes of perseverance, waiting, and trust, and draws from her experience with illness.

In 2025, Ebert received two K-LOVE Fan Awards nominations, including Breakout Single of the Year for "Flowers" and Female Artist of the Year.

== Discography ==
Title	Details
The Waiting	Released: July 10, 2026; Label: Sounds Good Music / Virgin Music Group; Format: Digital download, streaming

=== Singles ===
Title	Year	Peak chart positions		Album
Title	Year	US Christ Air	US Christ AC	Album
"All I Wanted Was a Coffee"	2022	—	—	Non-album singles
"Denim"	2023	—	—	Non-album singles
"Flowers" (original or with Seph Schlueter)	2024	26	23	The Waiting (EP)
"Overthinking"	2025	—	—	The Waiting (EP)
"No One Knows"	2025	—	—	The Waiting (EP)
"Forty One"	2026	—	—	The Waiting (EP)
"Questions"	2026	—	—	The Waiting (EP)
"—" denotes a recording that did not chart or was not released in that territory.
