= Young Oceans =

American Christian art rock band

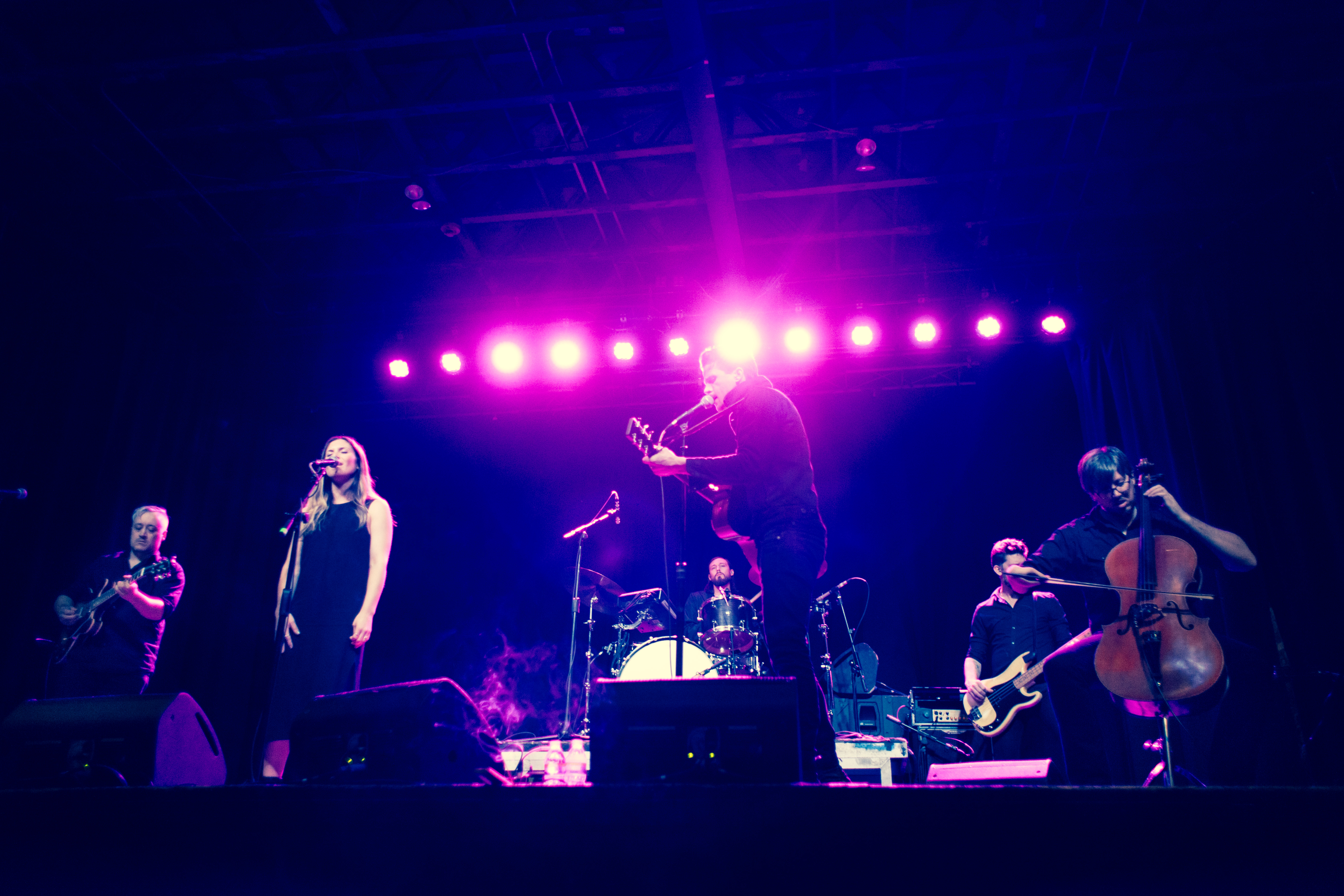
- Young Oceans performing in 2018

Background information
- Also known as: Eric Marshall
- Origin: Brooklyn, New York, U.S.
- Genres: Prayer Music; Alternative worship; Meditative
- Years active: 2012–present
- Label: Young Oceans
- Members: Eric Marshall
- Website: youngoceans.com

Young Oceans is an American music project led by songwriter, producer, and worship leader Eric Marshall. Originally formed in New York City, the project has been described as “prayer music” and combines elements of ambient music, alternative music, art rock, and contemporary worship. Marshalls' compositions are written both for church gatherings and for personal devotion and meditation.

== Members ==
Current members

- Eric Marshall

== Discography ==
Studio albums

- Young Oceans (April 3, 2012, Street Talk Media)
- Advent (Deluxe) (March 5, 2013, Street Talk Media)
- I Must Find You (September 30, 2014, Street Talk Media)
- Voices (April 8, 2016, Street Talk Media)
- Suddenly (Or The Nuclear Sunburst of the Truth Revealed) (October 20, 2017, Street Talk Media)
- Among the Ruins (Original Soundtrack - Live) (November 2019, Street Talk Media
- Songs of Christmas (December 2019, Street Talk Media)
- You Are Fullness 1 and 2 (late 2020)
- Subjects in Motion (late 2022)
- Somehow I Know It's Love (2024)
- Love Like Raindrops Made of Light (2025)
- Music for After Amen (2026)

EPs

- Advent (December 2, 2012, Street Talk Media)
