= Seeker & Servant =

- Also known as: Seeker and Servant
- Origin: Jackson, Mississippi
- Genres: Worship, CEDM, CCM, Christian rock
- Years active: 2012–present
- Members: Cameron Wood; Chandler Wood; Kody Gautier
- Website: seekerandservantmusic.com

Seeker & Servant were an American worship band from Jackson, Mississippi, where the trio started making music in 2012. As of 2021, the band revealed on their Facebook page they are no longer making music. They play CEDM, CCM, and Christian rock styles of music. Their first release, Into Your Love, I Go, a studio album, was released in 2014. They released a second studio album, You Alone Forever, in 2015.

== Background ==
The group started in 2012, with brothers Cameron and Chandler Wood getting together with Kody Gautier to form their trio in Jackson, Mississippi.

== Members ==
- Cameron Wood
- Chandler Wood

=== Former members ===
- Kody Gautier (2013-2015)

== Discography ==
- Into Your Love, I Go (January 7, 2014)
- You Alone Forever (November 13, 2015)

You Alone Forever received a 4.5-star review from Worship Leader magazine.
