= Alexis Peña (singer) =

Columbian singer (born 1984)

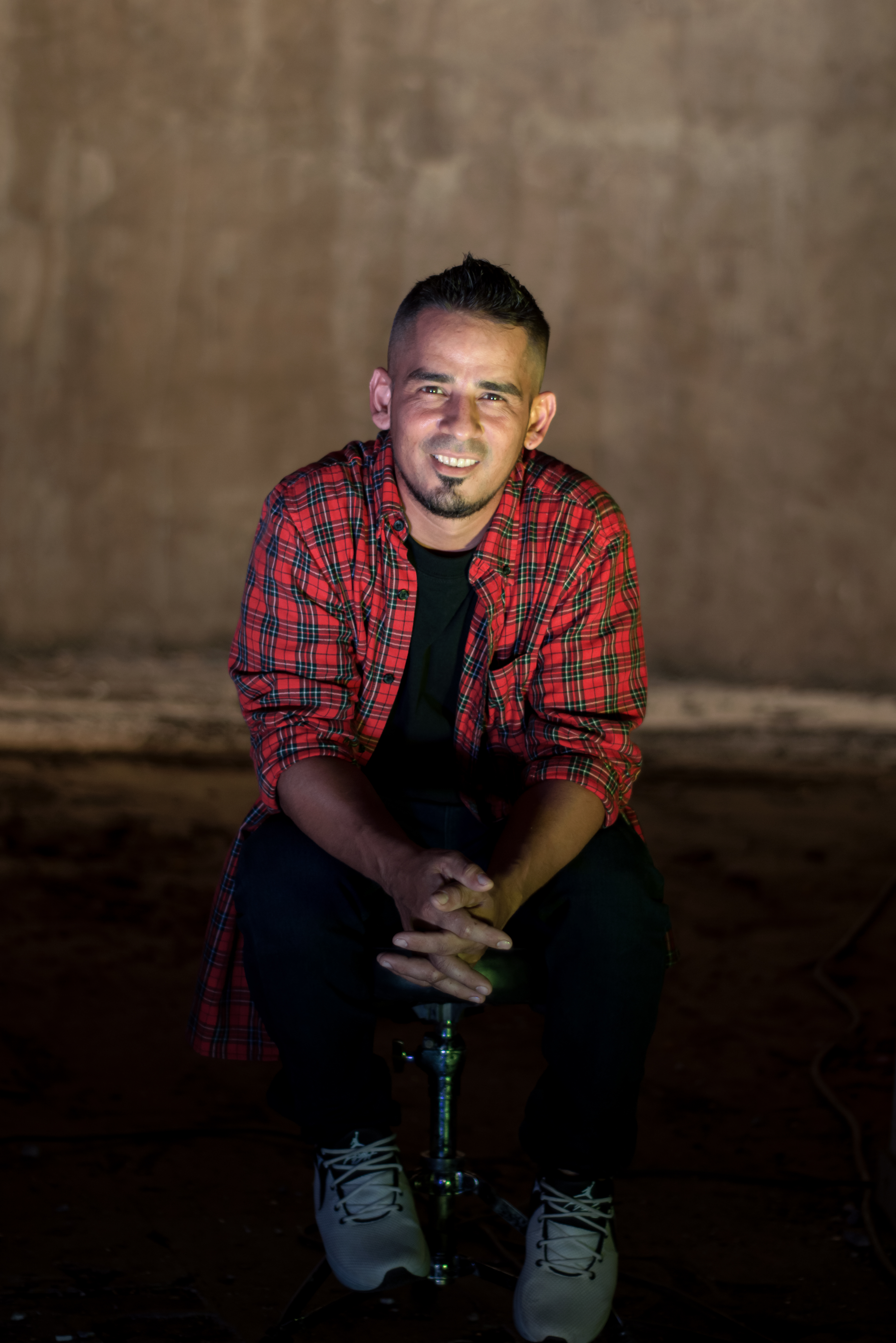

Background information
- Also known as: Alexis Peña
- Born: Jaime Alexis Peña Molina; February 2, 1984 (age 42); Piedecuesta, Santander, Colombia
- Genres: Contemporary worship music; Christian rock; Latin pop; Rock en Español
- Occupations: Singer, pastor, songwriter, record producer
- Instruments: Vocals, piano, percussion Bass
- Years active: 2002–present
- Label: Amorecords
- Website: alexispoficial.tk

Jaime Alexis Peña Molina better known as Alexis Peña (born 2 February 1984) is a Colombian Christian music, singer, songwriter, worship leader, pastor, author, teacher, and speaker known for combining practical biblical principles with the flow of prophetic songs. He plays contemporary worship music for a Latin music audience.

== Early and personal life ==
Alexis Peña was born in Piedecuesta, Santander in 1984. He is the youngest brother of five children and grew up in a dysfunctional home. He left home at age 12 and became a drug addict and an alcoholic. At age 18, he met Jesus in a local church and left drugs and alcohol to devote himself to writing songs and singing to God. At age 20, he married Nancy Peña with whom he has a son Angel Alexis Peña.

Peña wrote his first worship song at age 18. In the mid-2000s, he was a worship leader at the Confraternidad Cristiana Internacional in Piedecuesta.

He was ordained as the principal pastor of Casa de adoracion (House of Worship) in Piedecuesta in 2011. He was sent as a missionary to the city of Maracaibo, Venezuela in 2017.

== Career ==
Peña is the principal pastor in the Casa de adoración in Piedecuesta, Colombia. Additionally, he is the founder and leader of the school of worshipers Adoración genuina.

He began his musical career in 2002 as part of a Christian rock band, Si previo aviso (Unannounced).

Peña recorded his first album in 2010, Abriste mis ojos (Open my eyes), which was followed by an international tour. He was ordained as the principal pastor in Casa de adoracion (House of worship) in Piedecuesta in 2011.

He recorded El sacrificio de tu amor (The sacrifice of your love) in 2015. It sold well in Latin American countries like Venezuela, Ecuador, Peru, Panama and his native Colombia in the tour El sacrificio de tu amor, in 2016 with this same album is nominated as best Latin song of the year in the AMCL awards.

In 2016, he recorded Yo te prometo (I promise you), which includes duets with different Latin American musicians from Venezuela, Ecuador, Peru, Panama, Dominican Republic and Colombia. The album was nominated for several Latin American music awards. Peña was sent as a missionary to Venezuela in 2017.

== Discography ==
- Abriste mis ojos (2010)
- El sacrificio de tu amor (2015)
- Yo te prometo (2016)
- "Resucitame" featuring Aline Barros (2016) single Smule
- Vida hecha canción (2017)
- El tiempo llego (2018)
- Tu rareza (2019)
- Direccionados (2019) featuring Alex Márquez & The maestro
- Muestrame tu gloria (2020)
- Aleluya - Hallelujah (Versión Cuarentena) Featuring various artists (2020)
- El Dios que tengo yo (Versión Cuarentena) Featuring Isaac Idrovo (2020)
- Dios subió a su trono (2021) Jaime Murrell tribute
- Tu Santo nombre (2021)
- Latido de mi corazón featuring Fernando Pinillos (2021)
- Aun si no lo haces (2021)
- Que niño es este? (2021)
- Resucitame (Live) (2022)
- Yo soy de ti feat Juan Miguel (2022)
- Casa de adoración (Casa de milagros) (2023)
- Preciosa sangre (live) (2023)
- Aguas profundas featuring New Culture band (2024)
- Preciosa sangre (Studio) (2024)
- El sacrificio de tu amor (live) (2024)
- Nuestro Dios reina (Our God reigns) (live) (2024)
- La bondad de Dios (Goodness of God) feat New Culture Band (2024)
- Espontaneo - No Te Rindas, Tienes un Padre (Live) (2024)
- Bésame - Espontaneo - Ven Disfruta Mi Adoración (Live) (2024)
- Canción de Navidad (Razón de la Navidad) (2024)
