= Harvest (band) =

American Christian band

- Also known as: Jerry Williams and Harvest
- Origin: Lindale, Texas
- Genres: Contemporary Christian music, Gospel
- Years active: 1977–1995
- Labels: Everlasting Spring; Milk & Honey; Greentree; Benson
- Past members: Jerry Williams; Ed Kerr; Paul Wilbur; Tommy Hoeser; Ben Ketting; Steve Cummins; Wes Aarum; Jeff Seighman; Jim Meyer; Elisa Meyer; Mike Coker

Harvest was a Christian band founded in Bloomington, Indiana, by Jerry Williams in 1977. The vision of Harvest was to see 100 million people come to know Jesus Christ personally through the band's music ministry.

== History ==
Jerry Williams came from a nightclub entertainment background, and music had been a major part of his life. In an interview, Williams stated that "[he] realized there had to be more to life than sports cars and dating beauty queens . . . I became a Christian." Williams spent some time playing the guitar on Texas streets before becoming a pastor in Bloomington, Indiana.

Along with Jerry Williams, the original members of Harvest were Ed Kerr and Paul Wilbur, both of whom were music students. Wilbur had met Williams at a church where Williams was the youth pastor, and Williams had been influential in Wilbur's decision to become a Christian. Ed Kerr, who graduated from Indiana University with an M.A. in piano performance, was a mutual friend of both Williams and Wilbur. Kerr met Williams at a rally at Indiana University in Bloomington and made a decision to become a Christian afterwards. The three men collaborated on the first two albums created by Harvest: Harvest and Morning Sun.

Later in 1981, personal problems forced Williams to disband the original Harvest group, which at one time had numbered five. The group was reformed as a duo of Williams and Kerr. Williams and Kerr were together for the production of many records, including It's Alright Now, Send Us to the World, Voices, Only the Overcomers, Give Them Back, Holy Fire and Carry On. In 1982 the magazine CCM took notice of the duo in its article, "A Bountiful Harvest." The writer praised the group's vocal harmonies and was especially fond of the song "Because I Am" (found on the album It's Alright Now).

In 1988, Discovery Broadcasting Network recorded a live video of Harvest in concert. On the cover of the video, the network stated that Harvest averages "over 100 concerts a year."

By 1991, Ed Kerr left the group and Harvest became a five-player band led by Williams. With various members, Williams' band produced Let's Fight (For a Generation), Mighty River, and 41 Will Come. In 1992 the band went on an "Olympic and European Tour." They performed in Spain at the Barcelona Summer Olympics and at the Sevilla World Expo. Their tour also took them into Germany as part of Operation Mobilisation's "Love Europe" crusade. Harvest finished its tour with a performance in the Netherlands.

"Because I Am" (1982)
Harvest's song reached No. 8 in 1983.

== Music Style ==
According to Jerry Williams in 1988, Harvest's sound was "light middle-of-the-road to light contemporary rock." He described it as hard to classify because it was a real mixture of styles. The group sound incorporated a little bit of rock, some country, and really good harmonies. Williams likened the group's harmonization to the Gatlin Brothers, who he had grown up listening to. Williams also said that "Every time people have tried to figure out who we sound like, we sound like Harvest. There's really no one else who sounds like us." But, when pressed to liken the band's sound to another's style, Williams said it was similar to that of Christian performer Wayne Watson.

== Discography ==
=== Studio albums ===
Everlasting Spring

- 1979: Harvest

Milk & Honey Records

- 1981: Morning Sun
- 1982: It's Alright Now
- 1983: Send Us to the World
- 1984: Voices

Greentree Records

- 1985: The Best of Harvest
- 1986: Only the Overcomers
- 1987: Give Them Back

Benson Records

- 1988: Holy Fire
- 1990: Carry On
- 1991: The Early Works
- 1991: Let's Fight (For a Generation)
- 1993: Mighty River
- 1995: 41 Will Come

=== Videos ===
- 1987: A Call to Action
- 1992: Let's Fight (For a Generation)

== Jerry Williams Discography ==
=== Studio albums ===
- 1996: Warriors Arise
- 2001: Flood Over Me
- 2003: The Angel's Anthem
- 2006: Gideon, A Mighty Warrior
- 2009: Thank You
- 2013: Psalms Project Musical Devotional
- 2016: Christmastime EP (5 songs including the popular "O Holy Night" from the "Jesus, The Best Gift of All" CD (Benson,1994)
- 2018: Till I Cry Holy
- 2019: The Psalms Project Vol. 1-3 (3CDs)
- 2019: Hold the Fort
- 2020: Church Arise
- 2021: Marching On
- 2022: All the Praise
- 2022: Unfailing Love
- 2023: He's Passing By
- 2024: The Hymns Project

== Ed Kerr Discography ==
- 1990 Unexpected Turns
- 2011 Christmas In Ivory
- 2021 The Winter, The Wind

== Christian Radio Hits ==
Album	Song	Year	Position
It's Alright Now	"Because I Am"	1982	8
	"The Wedding Day"	1982	24
	"Behold God"	1982	26
Send Us To The World	"The Army of the Lord"	1984	1
	"The Blood of the Lamb"	1984	8
	"If We Don't Believe"	1984	12
Voices	"On the Water"	1985	21
Only the Overcomers	"Only the Overcomers"	1987	16
Give Them Back	"All That is in Me"	1987	10

== See also ==
- Jesus Music
