= Matt Price (musician) =

- Born: Matthew Lee Price; July 28, 1987 (age 39); Atlanta, Georgia
- Origin: Nashville, Tennessee
- Genres: Christian pop, worship
- Occupations: Singer, songwriter, music producer, worship Leader
- Instruments: vocals, guitar, keys
- Years active: 2013–present
- Website: mattpriceonline.com

Matthew Lee Price (born July 28, 1987) is an American Christian musician, music producer, and worship leader, who primarily plays Christian pop and contemporary worship music. He has released two extended plays, We Won't Waver, in 2013, and, Dream, in 2016.

== Early and personal life ==
Price was born, Matthew Lee Price, on July 28, 1987, in Atlanta, Georgia, where he resided until his departure in 2014, for Nashville, Tennessee. He is married to Charae.

== Music career ==
He started his music recording career in 2013, by releasing, an extended play, We Won't Waver, on September 24, 2013. He released a single, "Our Great Healer", in 2014, featuring Laura Sully. His subsequent extended play, Dream, was released on February 10, 2016.

== Discography ==
EPs

- We Won't Waver (September 24, 2013)
- Dream (February 10, 2016)

Singles

- "Let Your Life Flow" (2013)
- "Our Great Healer" (2014, featuring Laura Sully)
- "Beautiful Now" (2015)
