= Márcio Valadão =

Brazilian pastor, author, and televangelist (born 1947)

- Born: 24 November 1947 (age 78); Belo Horizonte, Minas Gerais
- Occupations: Pastor, apostle, author and televangelist

Márcio Roberto Vieira Valadão (born 24 November 1947) is a Brazilian pastor, apostle, author, and televangelist. He is a former senior pastor of the Lagoinha Church.

== Biography ==
Márcio Valadão, husband of Renata Valadão and father of Ana Paula, André and Mariana Valadão, is the senior pastor and leader of the Lagoinha Baptist Church which has more than 82,000 members. Was anointed apostle in 2001. The pastor became president of the Lagoinha Church in 1972, which was previously chaired by José Rego. He is also the founder of the television network Rede Super, founded in 2000.

The pastor is the grandfather of Isaque, Benjamim, Lorenzo, Vitório, Tito, Davi, Bella and Angel Valadão.

Márcio Valadão was affectionately nicknamed "paistor" (father) Márcio by members of his church.

His church became national and international prominence with the Diante do Trono group, initially headed by their children Ana Paula Valadão and André Valadão.

The pastor has since 1990 the Profetizando Vida television program, which is now displayed by Rede Super in 2002 and appears since then.
