= Paul Wilbur =

American musician (born 1951)

- Born: Paul Robert Wilbur; January 18, 1951 (age 75); Jacksonville, Florida, U.S.
- Genres: Worship
- Occupations: Singer, songwriter, worship leader
- Instruments: Vocals, guitar
- Years active: 1979–present
- Labels: Integrity; Hosanna!; Epic; Venture3Media
- Website: wilburministries.com

Paul Robert Wilbur (born January 18, 1951) is an American Christian musician, worship leader, and guitarist. He has released albums with Integrity Music, Hosanna! Music, Epic Records, and Venture3Media during his career. An adherent of Messianic Judaism, Wilbur's first known musical work, Up to Zion, was the first of a number of albums recorded primarily for Integrity Music; with many of his albums being recorded in Jerusalem.

== Early life ==
Paul Robert Wilbur was born on January 18, 1951 to a Jewish father and Baptist mother. Although he attended many different churches as a child, Wilbur further explored Judaism as an undergraduate in college. It was then that he began attending a local synagogue, but continued to believe in Christ, recognizing Him as the Jewish Messiah.

== Music career ==
During college in the 1970s, Wilbur planned on becoming an opera singer. His musical pursuits changed when he began to focus on Christian music. Wilbur's recording career began in a group called Harvest with Ed Kerr and Jerry Williams. The trio recorded two albums, the self-titled first album Harvest (1979) and their second album in 1981 called Morning Sun. Wilbur left after that leaving Kerr and Williams to continue with the band. He joined the group Israel's Hope. They released Introducing Israel's Hope in 1987.

Wilbur's solo career began in 1991, with the release, Up to Zion, a live album, released by Hosanna! Music. He has received reviews for nine of his albums from Cross Rhythms. Those reviewed were: Shalom Jerusalem in 1995, Holy Fire in 1997, Jerusalem Arise! in 1999, Pray for the Peace of Jerusalem in 2002, The Watchman in 2005, Worship from the Heart of Israel in 2006, Praise Adonai in 2007, Live: A Night of Extravagant Worship in 2008, and Desert Rain in 2010, which was also reviewed by Worship Leader. The 2013 album, Your Great Name, was reviewed by CCM Magazine.

== Personal life ==
At one time Wilbur resided in Jacksonville, Florida. He is married to Luanne Wilbur. They have two sons, Nathan and Joel.

== Discography ==
- Harvest (1979)
- Morning Sun (1981)
- Israel's Hope (1985)
- Arise O Lord (with Israel's Hope) (1987)
- Up to Zion (1991)
- Shalom Jerusalem (1995)
- Holy Fire (1997)
- Jerusalem Arise! (1999)
- Fuego Santo (1999) (Spanish version of Holy Fire)
- Levántate Jerusalén! (1999) (Spanish version of Jerusalem Arise!)
- Heal Our Land with Don Moen in South Korea (recorded in 1999, released in 2000)
- Shalom Jerusalém (with Ana Paula Valadão) (2000)
- Celebración En Sión (2000) (Spanish version of Up To Zion)
- Más De Ti (with Don Moen and Aline Barros) (2000)
- Lion of Judah (2001)
- Leon De Juda (2001) (Spanish version of Lion of Judah)
- Pray for the Peace of Jerusalem (2002)
- Shalom Jerusalém! with Cristina Mel (2002)
- The Watchman (2005)
- El Shaddai (2005) (Spanish version of The Watchman)
- Worship from the Heart of Israel (2006)
- Praise Adonai (2007)
- Live: A Night of Extravagant Worship (2008)
- Desert Rain (2010)
- Lluvia en el Desierto (2010) (Spanish version of Desert Rain)
- Your Great Name (2013)
- Tu Gran Nombre (2013) (Spanish version of Your Great Name)
- Ultimate Collection (2014)
- Colección (2014) (Spanish version of Ultimate Collection
- Forever Good (2016)
- Por Siempre Fiel (2016) (Spanish version of Forever Good)
- Roar from Zion (2019)
- Selah (2020)
- Shouts of Joy (2023)
