= Torrey Salter =

American singer

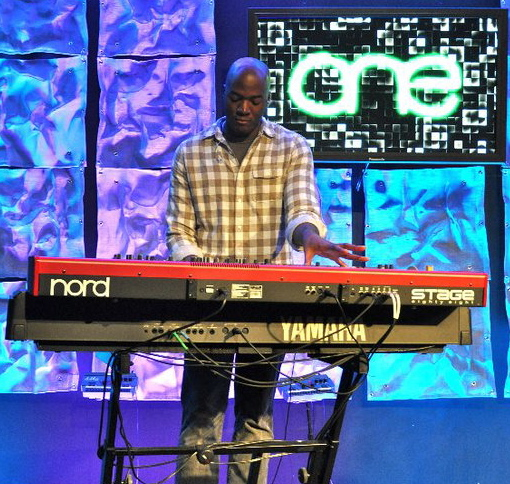
- Torrey Salter

Background information
- Born: July 15, 1988 (age 38)
- Origin: Birmingham, Alabama, United States
- Genres: Alternative rock Independent
- Occupations: Singer, Pianist, Guitarist
- Instruments: Vocals, Piano, Acoustic guitar
- Years active: 2007 - present
- Label: unsigned

Torrey Salter (born July 15, 1988) is an Alternative rock singer/songwriter, pianist, and guitarist from Birmingham, Alabama. He began writing music at the age of 17 after being encouraged by his family and friends and influenced by Coldplay and The Fray.

== Biography ==
=== Childhood and youth ===
Salter was raised in a Christian home, the second of four children (a sister Taira and brothers Titus and Trey). He became more musically active at age 16 while taking piano and vocal lessons.

At Auburn University, he began singing and playing piano at weddings around town. His family and friends encouraged him to learn popular songs and to eventually write his own. He switched his major to Music Performance and began his full-time music career by releasing his first single, "Bring Me Back".

== Discography ==
=== Albums ===
- Bring Me Back (single) (July 2008)
- Redemption (September 2008)
- You Alone (July 2011)

=== Tours ===
- Torrey Salter plays weddings and events thoroughout the town.
- He is rumored to go on tour during the summer of 2009.
