= Ana Paula Valadão =

Brazilian contemporary Christian singer (born 1976)

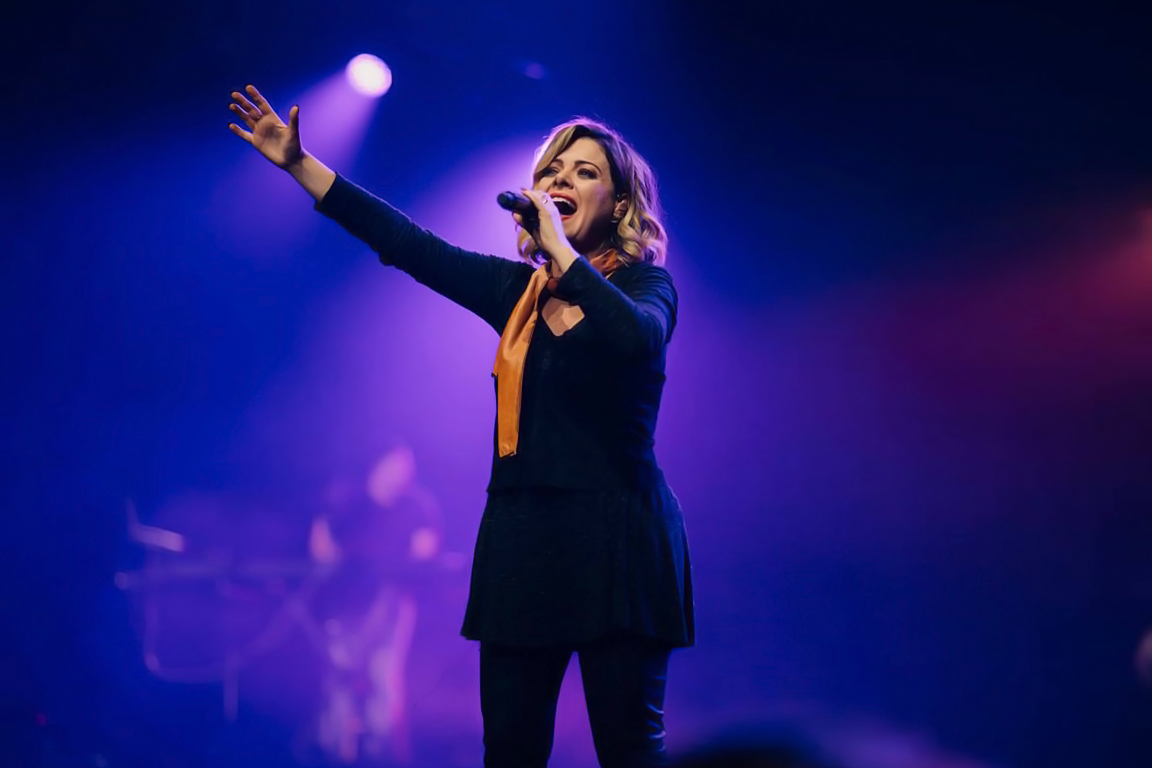

Background information
- Born: Ana Paula Machado Valadão; May 16, 1976 (age 50); Belo Horizonte, Minas Gerais, Brazil
- Genres: Worship, CCM
- Occupations: Singer, songwriter, pastor, author, television presenter
- Instrument: Vocals
- Years active: 1997–present
- Labels: Diante do Trono, Hosanna!, Integrity, Som Livre, Onimusic
- Member of: Diante do Trono (1997–present), Gateway Worship
- Website: diantedotrono.com

Ana Paula Machado Valadão Bessa (born May 16, 1976) is a Brazilian Christian worship leader, singer-songwriter and pastor. She is the leader of the contemporary praise band Diante do Trono, which has sold more than 15 million worship albums globally and has led worship gatherings of as many as two million people in attendance. She is also associated with the children's music project Crianças Diante do Trono, the worship collective DT Worship and the Before the Throne Church in Boca Raton, Florida, which she leads alongside her husband, pastor Gustavo Bessa.

Under her leadership, Diante do Trono has released more than 50 albums, including live recordings, studio and children's projects such as the Crianças Diante do Trono.

In a single performance, held on July 12, 2003, during the recording of the album Quero Me Apaixonar, Diante do Trono brought together over 2 million people at Campo de Marte Airport in São Paulo, being the largest audience of a Christian event in the world and the second largest audience in Brazil, second only to the Rock in Rio festival. Her band has also been a winner of the Talent Awards, by RecordTV and Promises Awards, by Rede Globo, and was nominated for a Latin Grammy Award in 2012 with the album Sol da Justiça.

Through the ministry Diante do Trono and her home church, Lagoinha Church, Valadão promotes various social, humanitarian and missionary actions, such as Projeto India, which combats human trafficking, the Missão DT, and other specific actions promoted during some of her live album recordings in Brazil and the Middle East. She is presently co-pastor of Before the Throne Church in Boca Raton, Florida, alongside her husband, Gustavo Bessa.

In 2012, she was named one of the 100 most important Brazilians of all time by a survey by broadcaster SBT in partnership with the BBC London. In 2013, she was cited by Forbes as the 89th most influential celebrity in Brazil.

== Life and career ==
Valadão is the daughter of Pastors Márcio Valadão and Renata Valadão, pastors of Lagoinha Church, a charismatic Baptist megachurch in their hometown of Belo Horizonte. She is the older sister of André Valadão and Mariana Valadão. She started her music career by participating in a group called King's Kids and her first album was Expressão de Fé, recorded by the King's Kids. Some time later, she participated in the choir El-Shammah and recorded the album Ele Tem Sido Fiel.

Valadão studied law at the Federal University of Minas Gerais (UFMG), but locked up the course in 1996, and therefore decided to attend the Christ for the Nations Institute (CFNI) in Dallas, Texas, United States. When she returned to Brazil, she began writing songs, and she recorded her first album entitled Diante do Trono in 1998. Its creation marked the beginning of the group Diante do Trono. Valadão married the pastor Gustavo Bessa on September 13, 2000, one year and eleven months after they met. Afterward she struggled to conceive and portrayed this difficulty in her CD Esperança, especially in the title track "Esperança". While recording her next CD, Ainda Existe Uma Cruz, she was pregnant with her first son Isaque Valadão Bessa, who was born on January 3, 2006, and on May 23, 2009, her second son, Benjamim Valadão Bessa, was born. In the same year, she also released her first solo album As Fontes do Amor.

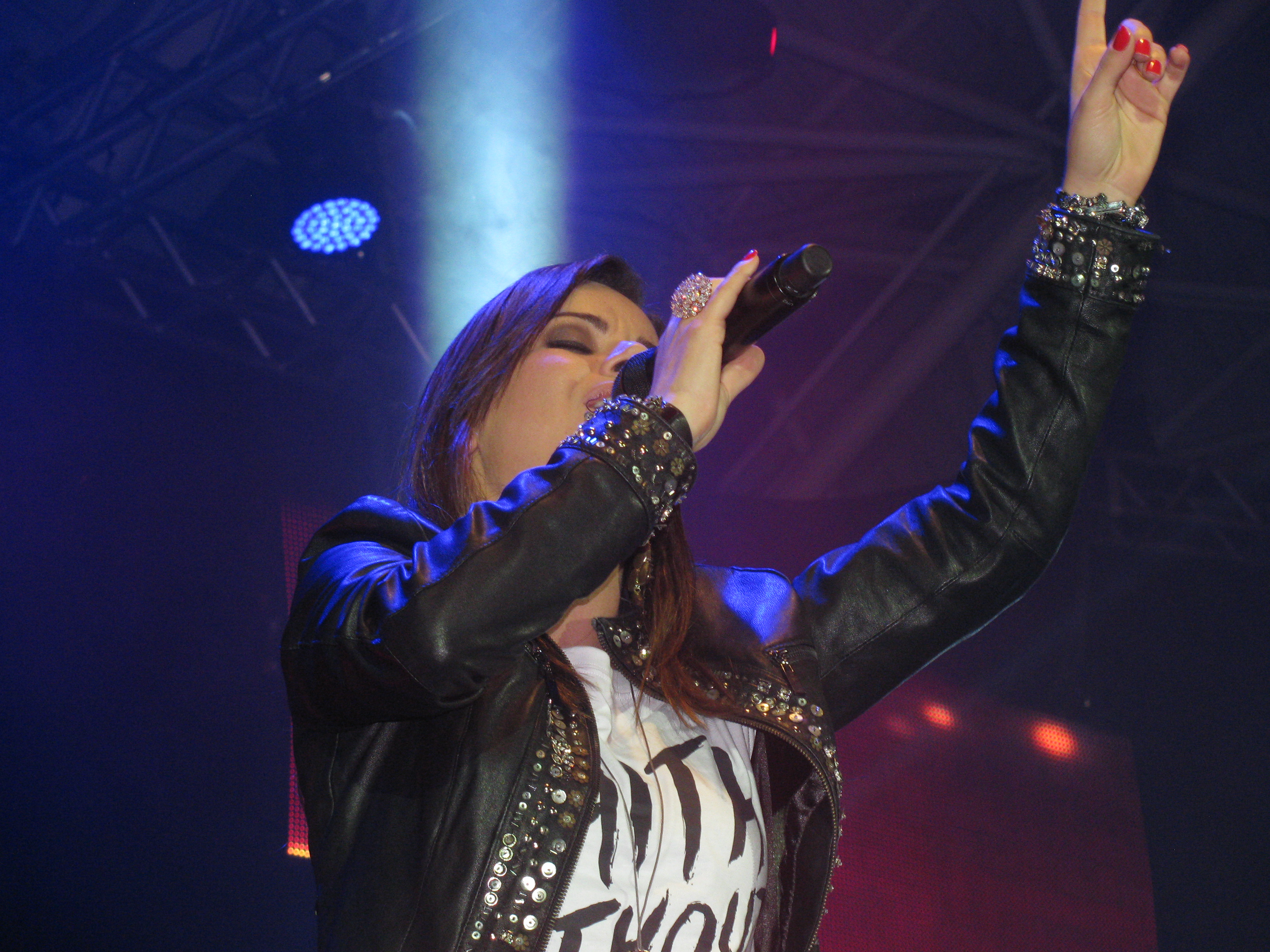
Valadão in 2013

In August 2009, she and her family moved to Dallas, where her husband continued his ministerial studies. However, she explained on Diante do Trono's official website that she decided that she would not leave the band and would continue to appear in all the group's main events. In May 2011, the family returned to Brazil.

Valadão has received more than 32 awards on behalf of her group. In 2004, of the 8 nominations that were submitted for Troféu Talento (a Brazilian award similar to the Dove Awards) she won 7, and was also nominated for awards in various categories in the 38th GMA Dove Awards for the album In The Father's Arms, though she won none. Diante do Trono has traveled to several countries in America, Europe, the Middle East, Africa, and Asia. Throughout its history, Valadão has remained head of the ministries, compositions and organizations of the group.

In July 2012, Valadão was considered one of the 100 most important Brazilians of all time by the Brazilian television network SBT in partnership with the BBC, where through the Internet the public suggested names of people who should be considered the great icons of Brazil. She has occupied the 97th position and participated in the program, O Maior Brasileiro de Todos os Tempos (English: The Greatest Brazilian of All Times) by singing Me Ama on Brazilian national television. In December of that year, she was cited by the American publication Forbes as the 89th most influential celebrity in Brazil.

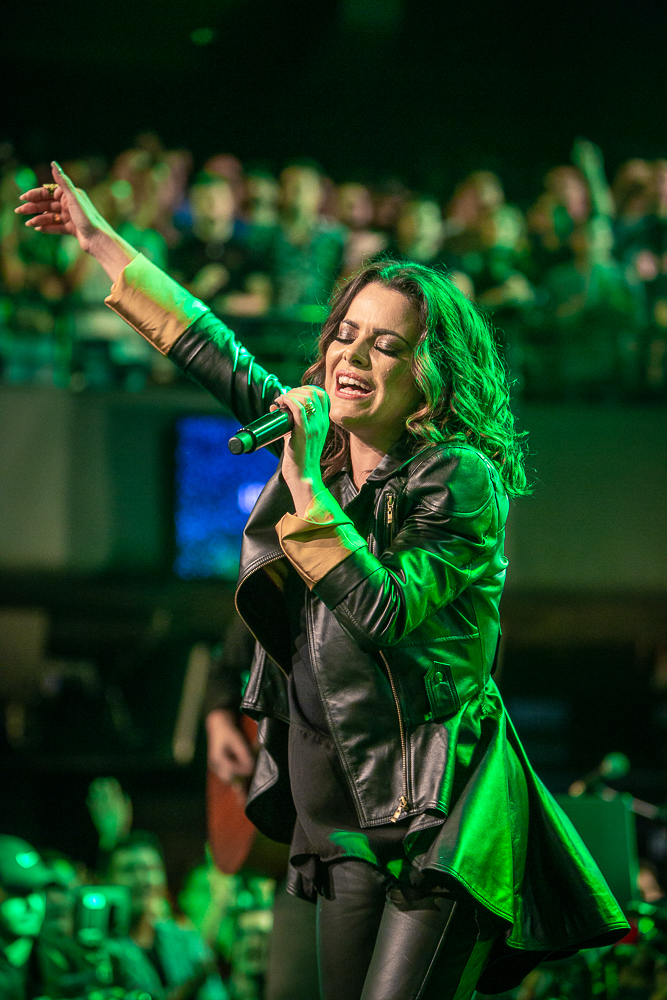
Valadão during the recording of Outra Vez in Belo Horizonte

In September 2015, Valadão was invited by the Christian Embassy of Jerusalem to minister at the Feast of Tabernacles in Ein Gedi desert and Pais Arena. At the event there were representatives of 95 nations, the singer participated representing Brazil and Latin America. Earlier in the same year, the singer had been invited to attend the global conference Empowered21 held in Israel. At the end of 2015, she and her family moved back to Dallas, where she taught at CFNI and served as a worship pastor at Gateway Church under her married name, Ana Paula Bessa. In this new period, she has ministered in diverse chapels and conferences by the United States, such as IHOPKC, Oral Roberts University, among others. She has also participated in television materials of CBN and Daystar Television Network.

In late 2017, she and her family moved to the state of Florida, where her husband continued his studies. During the 2018 Worship, Intercession, and Mission Diante do Trono Conference, Valadão announced that she would be presiding over a new Lagoinha satellite church in Miami, alongside her husband.

The South Florida branch of Lagoinha Church has since moved to Boca Raton and is called "Before the Throne Church - By Lagoinha", or "B.Church" for short.

In August 2024, Valadão reported recovering from severe clinical depression, mentioning that the pressure from organizing large events and the associated physical and emotional exhaustion contributed to the worsening of her condition.

=== Diante do Trono ===
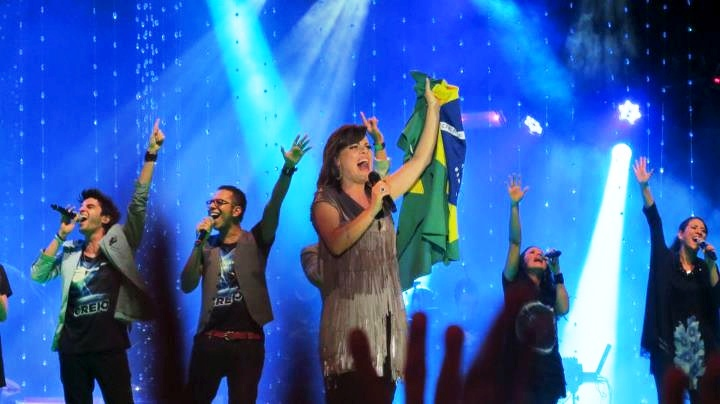
Valadão (holding a Brazilian flag) performing Vinho Novo during the recording of Creio in Manaus, Amazonas

Valadão has been the lead singer of the worship ministry Diante do Trono since 1997, when it was founded in the Lagoinha Church. The band has sold over 15 million albums, has received over 32 awards, is regarded internationally as the largest worship ministry in Latin America and the world, and has hosted a cumulative audience of more than 7 million to their various annual recordings.

=== Missão DT ===
Since childhood, Valadão has dedicated her love for missionary work. Diante do Trono's first album was recorded in 1998 to raise funds for a missionary project in India that rescues girls who are victims of sexual exploitation. Throughout her career, she has invested 90 percent of the proceeds received in missionary projects. On April 15, 2017, Valadão founded with her husband Gustavo Bessa, the "Missão DT", which aims to raise funds to support missionary projects in India, Israel, and also in the Brazilian Sertão, who has been embraced by her ministry in social causes since 2014, with the recording of the album Tu Reinas.

== Discography ==
Solo career

- Aclame ao Senhor (2000)
- Shalom Jerusalém with Paul Wilbur (2000)
- As Fontes do Amor (2009)
- Ana Paula Valadão Live in Finland (2010)
- 1976 - Autorais (2026)

with El-Shammah

- Ele Tem Sido Fiel (1997)
- Musical 20 Anos Diante do Trono (2018)

with Diante do Trono

- Diante do Trono (1998)
- Exaltado (1999)
- Águas Purificadoras (2000)
- Preciso de Ti (2001)
- Brasil Diante do Trono (2001)
- Nos Braços do Pai (2002)
- Quero Me Apaixonar (2003)
- Esperança (2004)
- Ainda Existe Uma Cruz (2005)
- Por Amor de Ti, Oh Brasil (2006)
- In the Father's Arms (2006)
- En los Brazos del Padre (2006)
- Tempo de Festa (2007)
- Príncipe da Paz (2007)
- Com Intensidade (2007)
- A Canção do Amor (2008)
- Tua Visão (2009)
- Aleluia (2010)
- Sol da Justiça (2011)
- Glória a Deus (2012)
- Creio (2012)
- Global Project: Português (2012)
- Renovo (2013)
- Tu Reinas (2014)
- Tetelestai (2015)
- Deus Reina (2015)
- Pra Sempre Teu (2016)
- Imersão (2016)
- Muralhas (2017)
- Imersão 2 (2017)
- Deserto de Revelação (2017)
- Eu e a Minha Casa (2018)
- Imersão 3 (2019)
- Outra Vez (2019)
- Imersão 4 (2020)
- Respirar (2021)
- Imersão 5 (2022)
- Sim e Amém (2023)
- Memórias de Coração (2023)
- De Nós Se Lembrará (2025)
- Delante Del Trono (2026)

with Crianças Diante do Trono

- Crianças Diante do Trono (2001)
- Amigo de Deus (2003)
- Quem é Jesus? (2004)
- Vamos Compartilhar (2005)
- Fëmijë Përpara Fronit (2005)
- Dzieci Przed Tronem (2006)
- Arca de Noé (2006)
- Samuel, O Menino Que Ouviu Deus (2007)
- Kim Bu İsa? (2008)
- Para Adorar ao Senhor (2008)
- Amigos do Perdão (2010)
- Davi (2012)
- Renovo Kids (2015)
- DT Babies (2016)
- Pó-De-Crescer (2025)

with Nations Before the Throne

- Suomi Valtaistuimen Edessä (2012)
- Läpimurto (2014)
- Deutuschland Vor Dem Thron (2015)

=== Participation in international albums ===
- Desert Rain (2010) – Paul Wilbur – solo in the song "You Are" for Integrity Music.
- Lluvia En El Desierto (2010) – Paul Wilbur – solo in the song "Eres Nuestro Dios" for Integrity Music.
- Respondiendo (2010) – Christ for the Nations Worship – solo in the song "Bajo La Sombra" for Integrity Music.
- Espera En Dios (2011) – Mike Herron – solo in the song "Dad A Jehová" for Integrity Music.
- Just the Name of Jesus (2018) – Life Fellowship Worship – solo in the song "Be Exalted" and duet in "Turn Your Eyes Upon Jesus" for Life Fellowship Worship.
- REVERE: Unscripted Portuguese (2022) – Revere – duet in the song "Caminho no Deserto / Way Maker" for Integrity Music.
- REVERE: Brasil (2022) – Revere – solo in the songs "Te Adoramos" and "We Adore You" for Integrity Music.
- Here Is Our Surrender (2024) – Revere – duet in the songs "We Adore You", "Te Adoramos" and "Sing Our Way / Crown Him" for Integrity Music.
- Shout to the Lord (All the Earth) (2026) – Darlene Zschech – featuring the song "Shout to the Lord (All the Earth)" for Integrity Music.

== Television program ==
- Programa Diante do Trono (2001–2010) / (2013–2015)
- Nos Bastidores com o DT (2011–2013)

== Bibliography ==
- Adoração Diante do Trono (2003)
- Verdadeira Adoração (2013)
- Reflexos da Alma with Devi Titus & Helena Tannure (2014)
