= Lagoinha Church =

Coordinates: 19.9004°S 43.9451°W

Lagoinha Baptist Church
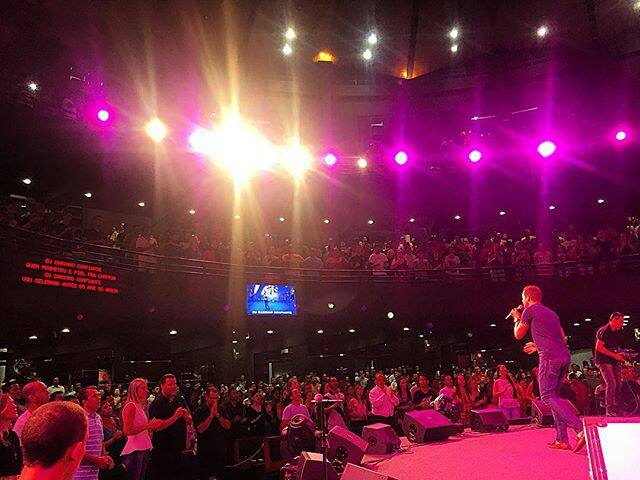
- Worship in 2016
- Lagoinha Baptist Church
- Location: Belo Horizonte, Minas Gerais
- Country: Brazil
- Denomination: Baptist
- Website: lagoinha.com

History
- Founded: December 20, 1957
- Founder: José Rego do Nascimento

Specifications
- Capacity: 7,000

Lagoinha Baptist Church (Portuguese: Igreja Batista da Lagoinha) is a charismatic Evangelical Baptist multi-site megachurch based in Belo Horizonte, Minas Gerais, in Brazil. The church became known through one of its ministries, the worship ministry Diante do Trono, which is one of the world's largest ministries of praise, worship and mission. Some of the main services are broadcast live via Internet and also via their own TV and radio station: Rede Super. It is affiliated with the National Baptist Convention, Brazil, and Baptist World Alliance. In December 2022, André Valadão became Senior pastor.

In 2026, amidst the fallout from the Banco Master scandal, the institution became informally associated with the affair—referred to in some public discourse as the "Banco Master church"—due to the connections between individuals linked to the church and former banker Daniel Vorcaro and his brother-in-law, Fabiano Zettel. Several churches and communities have left Lagoinha too the global convention linked to Lagoinha.

== History ==
Lagoinha Church was founded by José Rego on December 20, 1957 in Formiga street, 322, district of Lagoinha. It is the sixth Baptist Church in Belo Horizonte, became known as Lagoinha Baptist Church. The church also has a television network titled Rede Super.

On July 31, 1972, Márcio Valadão became the Senior pastor of the church, the church had 300 members.

In 2016, it had 100 campuses in Brazil and around the world.

In November 2022, Flavinho Marques became Senior pastor of the church.

In December 2022, André Valadão became Global Senior pastor.

Since Pastor André Valadão assumed the presidency of Lagoinha Global, the church has experienced a wave of significant departures. Thousands of members are leaving, while several affiliated churches have announced their independence, placing Valadão’s leadership under scrutiny.

In 2025, the Church had 50,000 people.

Linked to the Lagoinha Baptist Church, the fintech Clava Forte Bank is under investigation by the INSS Joint Parliamentary Inquiry Commission (CPMI) for its alleged involvement in a multi-billion-reais scheme involving illegal deductions from National Social Security Institute (INSS) benefits, as well as its ties to Banco Master. This information comes from Correio Brasiliense.

André Valadão praised the Daniel Vorcaro's family during a Lagoinha church service: 'friends for life, for decades' Following the scandal, André Valadão claims he was betrayed, as he seeks to distance himself from the Vorcaro family.

In 2026, Pastor André Valadão has confirmed the closure of Clava Forte Bank’s operations and denied any connection to Banco Master.

== Music ==
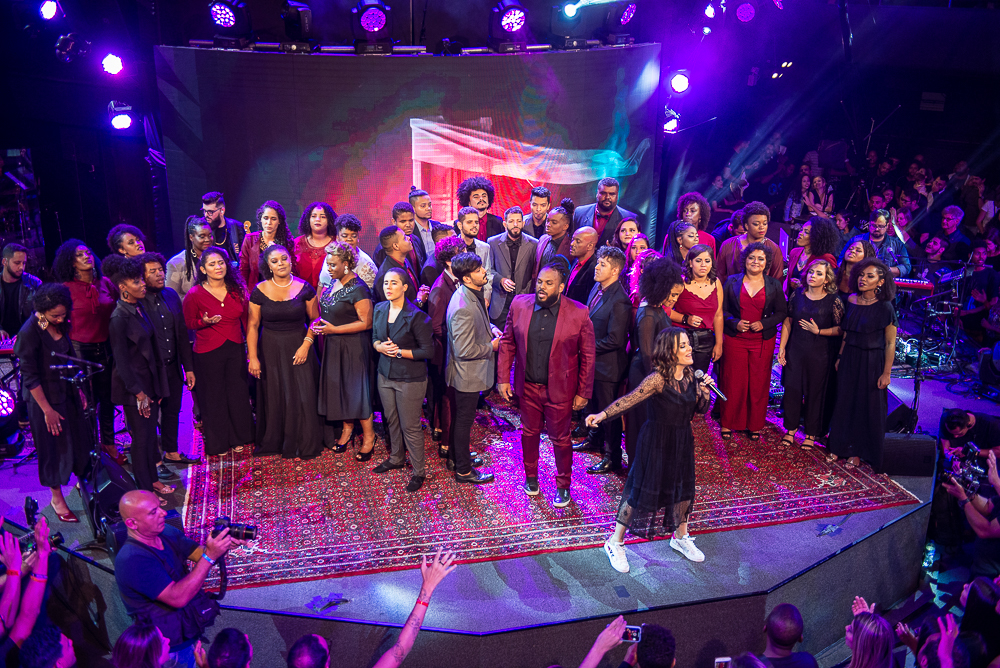
Diante do Trono's 19th live album recording at Lagoinha in 2019

In 1997, the Lagoinha worship ministry Diante do Trono, was formed in the church. After the release of their first album, Diante do Trono in 1998, the group became popular in Brazil. The release of Águas Purificadoras and Preciso de Ti garnered international recognition. They have become the largest worship ministry in Latin America and one of the world's largest praise ministries. It is also considered one of the most successful bands in Brazilian music.

In 2000, the group founded a house for young girls in India to combat prostitution.

== See also ==
- List of the largest evangelical megachurches
