= Contemporary worship =

Form of Christian worship

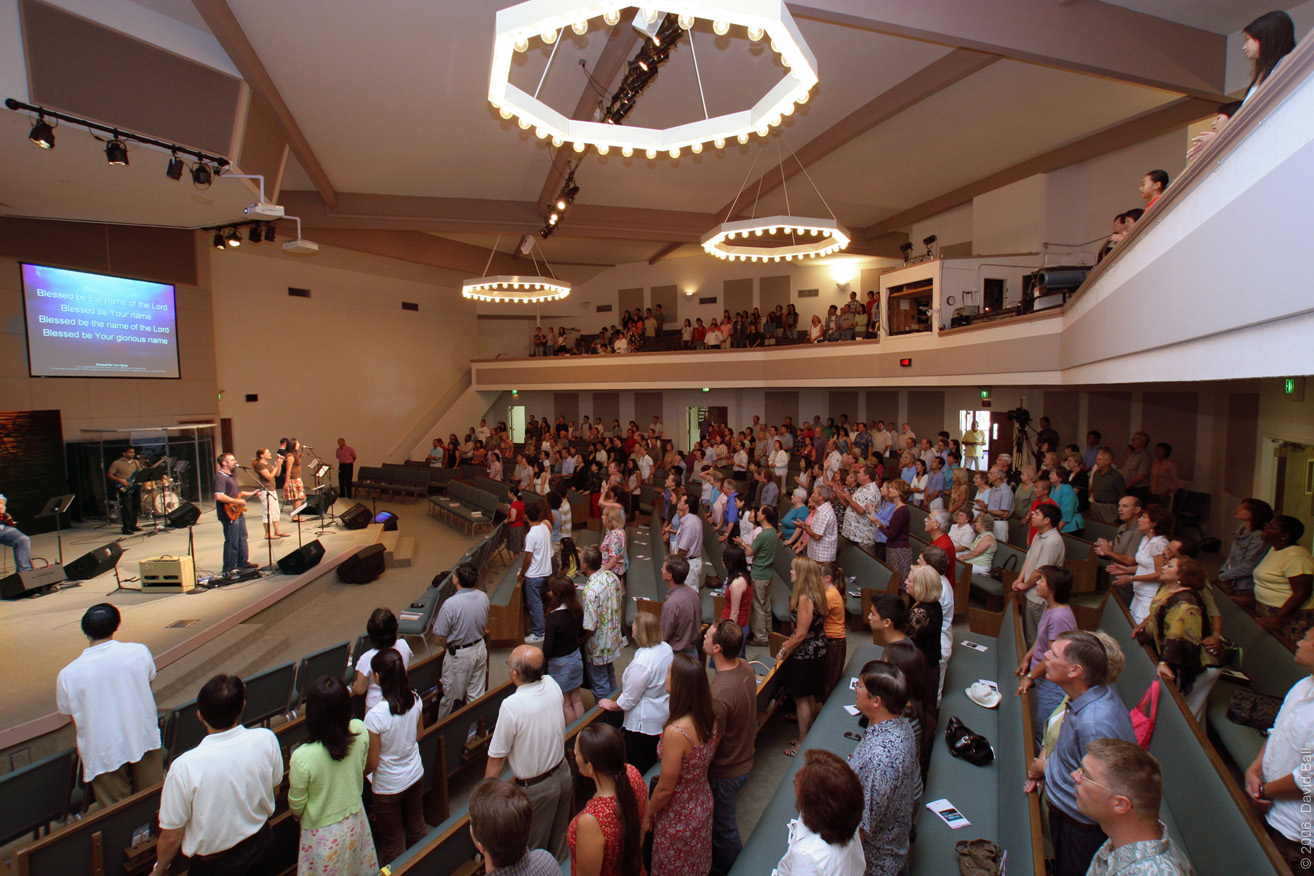
Contemporary Christian worship in a nondenominational Christian congregation

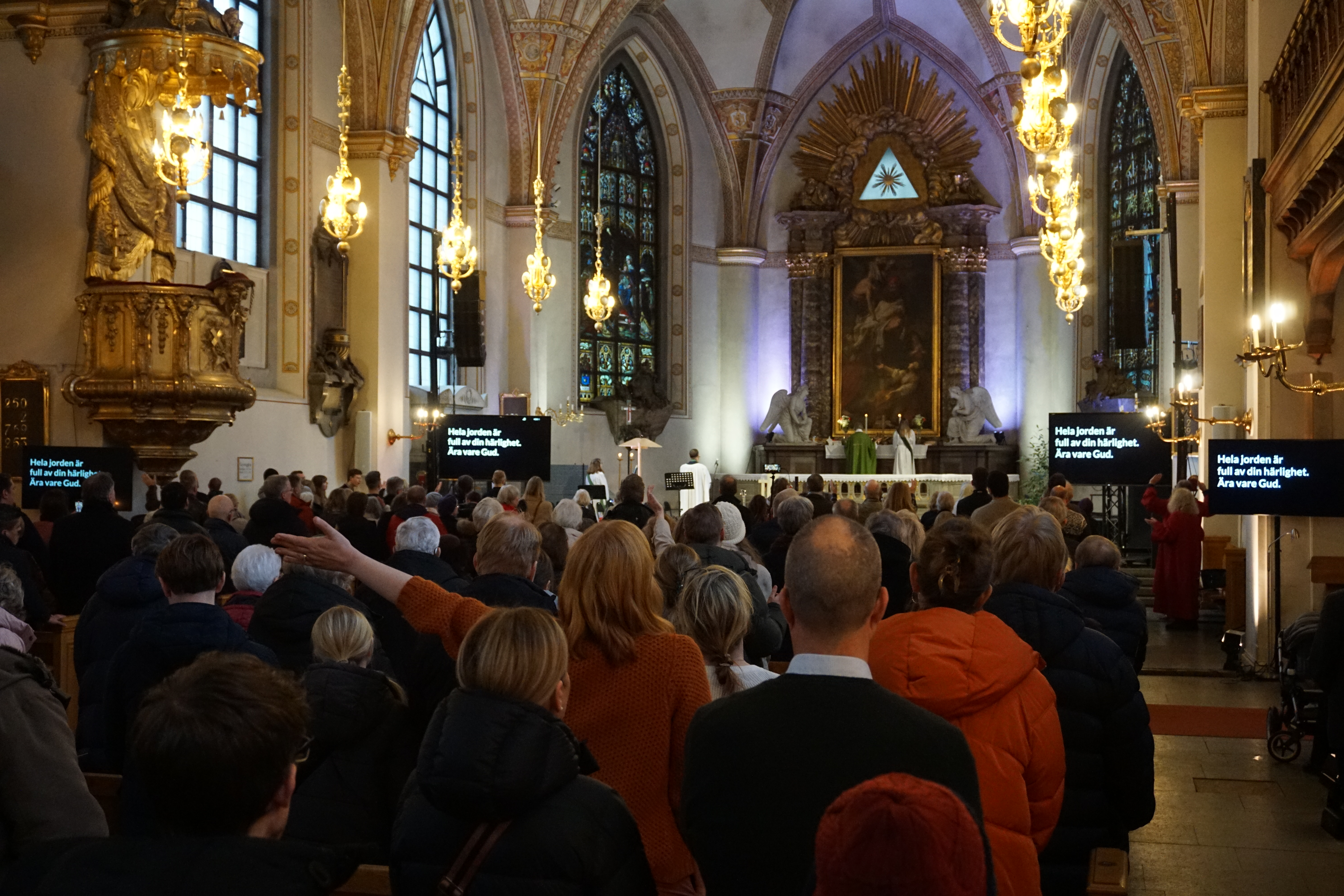
Mass in the Evangelical-Lutheran tradition being celebrated in a contemporary style in the Church of Sweden

Contemporary worship is a form of Christian worship that emerged within Western evangelical Protestantism in the 20th century. It was originally confined to the charismatic movement, but is now found in a wide range of churches, including many which do not subscribe to a charismatic theology. In many evangelical churches (usually Baptist, Methodist, Quaker, Pentecostal, and nondenominational Christian), contemporary worship uses contemporary worship music in an informal setting. Congregational singing typically comprises a greater proportion of the service than in conventional forms of worship. Where contemporary worship is practiced in churches with a liturgical tradition (Roman Catholicism and Evangelical-Lutheranism), elements of the liturgy are retained while the music sung is accompanied by guitars and drums, rather than the traditional organ or piano. The terms historic worship, traditional worship or liturgical worship are sometimes used to describe conventional worship forms and distinguish them from contemporary worship.

== History ==
The contemporary worship phenomenon emerged from the Jesus Movement in North America in the 1960s and the "Charismatic Renewal Movement" in Australia and New Zealand during the 1970s and 1980s. The function of music in services, the style of songs, their performance, the explicit theology of the lyrics, and the theology implied by these aspects distinguish “contemporary worship” from traditional worship in practice, and theological background. Contemporary worship music takes a significant part of the service time and repetition of phrases reinforces the theological content of the service. The impact is heightened as creeds and formal prayers are seldom used. Theologically, contemporary worship music is influenced by Pentecostal and evangelical theologies. However, the phenomenon has influenced all major denominations to some degree. There is a wide variety in practice between churches.

Contemporary worship is intrinsically related to the contemporary Christian music industry.

== Block worship ==
Contemporary worship normally includes a number of songs sung in succession, with little or no intermediate speaking. In more traditional forms of worship, it would be normal for hymns to be interspersed with prayers, readings, liturgical items, etc. The traditional practice is sometimes referred to as a 'hymn-prayer sandwich' and the contemporary form 'block worship' or the 'praise and worship'.

== Worship leader ==
A notable feature of contemporary worship is the worship leader. A worship leader is normally a musician (often a guitarist or pianist) with good singing ability whose role it is to lead the congregational singing. Many composers of contemporary worship songs are also worship leaders. The worship leader has a prominent role in contemporary worship services and is responsible for much of the spiritual direction of the meeting and often will choose the songs that will be sung. This can be contrasted with traditional churches, where the entire service is normally led by a member of the clergy. Also, in many cases, the worship leader is responsible for recruiting, assigning, and training other musicians to compose a worship band or team.

A popular definition of the worship leader's role is by Bob Kauflin: "A faithful worship leader magnifies the greatness of God in Jesus Christ through the power of the Holy Spirit by skillfully combining God's Word with music, thereby motivating the gathered church to proclaim the gospel, to cherish God's presence, and to live for God's glory."

=== Worship band ===
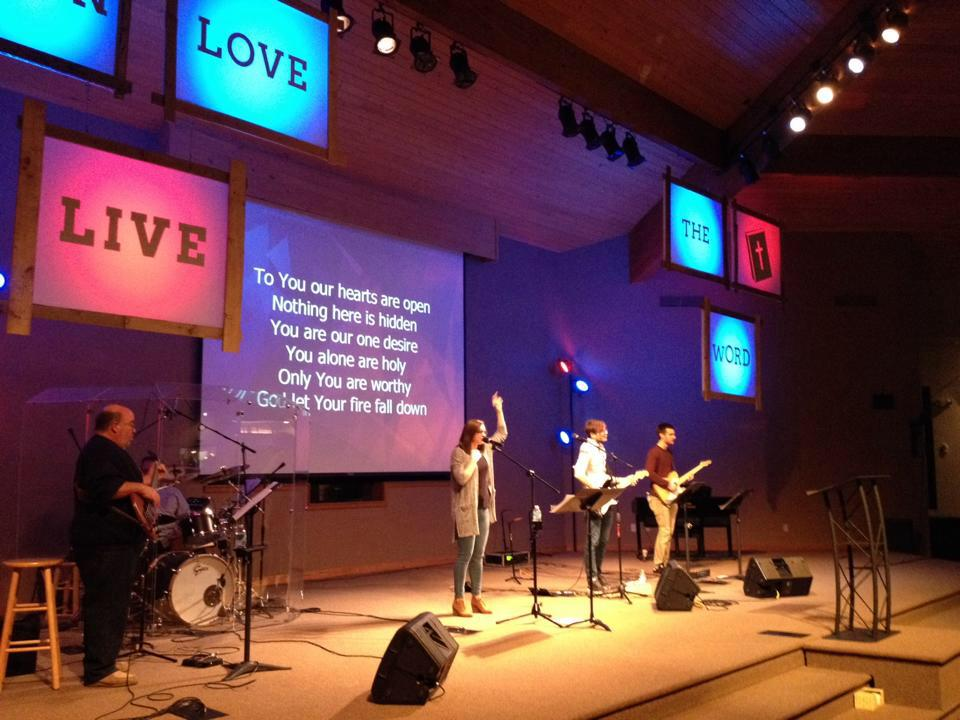
A worship team leads this nondenominational Christian congregation in song; projected lyrics on a motion background seen in the rear

The style of contemporary worship music is influenced by popular music and not suitable for the traditional church organ. Most churches adopting contemporary worship therefore have a worship band or praise band to provide music during their services. Other terms such as worship team, worship group, praise team, or music group are also used.

Worship bands are most common in evangelical denominations, but can also be found among other Christian denominations.

Most worship bands are church-based and seldom play outside their own churches. However, some contemporary Christian music bands also act as worship bands for events, and may label themselves as such.

Worship bands have varying compositions and use a variety of non-traditional church instruments. In the 1970s and 1980s, a folk music style was commonplace with acoustic string or woodwind instruments being popular. Today, the influence of rock music is widespread and the use of electric instruments has increased.

Worship bands normally also include vocalists and a worship leader and usually lead congregational singing replacing the traditional church choir and pipe organ, although occasionally churches use both bands and choirs. In fact, apart from the singers and musicians, the people "handling the presentation slides, the sound guy who manages the mixer, and all others who support the worship ministry in many different ways" are also considered a part of the worship team or band. A worship band can create a contemporary sound to the worship that younger worshipers can identify with. Worship bands may also be utilized with the rationale that some non-churchgoing visitors will feel more comfortable.

=== Projected lyrics ===
The charismatic movement also resulted in large numbers of songs being written. It became impractical for churches to use hymn or song books, as a single book rarely contained all the material they wanted to sing, and the turnover in songs was rapid.

Hence many churches that adopt a contemporary style of worship project the words to the songs onto one or more screens. Originally, this was done using an overhead projector or occasionally a slide projector, but as video projectors fell in price and improved in performance, it became more popular to use a computerised system. Specialised software, known as worship presentation programs, was developed to generate the images for display.

=== Creative arts ===
Contemporary worship often includes other elements not found in conventional forms of worship. Drama, typically in the form of short sketches, is sometimes used to highlight a topic of teaching. Dance is commonplace and includes both choreographed and improvised dance as both an expression of worship and again for teaching purposes. Occasionally short videos or film clips are shown.

== Criticism ==
Critics have also argued that contemporary worship services are actually 'entertainment', claiming that the increased amounts of music (often played by a band) and lack of intercession, create the atmosphere of a concert or performance.

Interviewed in Christianity Today in 2011, Grove City College professor T. David Gordon stated that churches were adding hymns to contemporary services, but that in the past the main concern had never been how new the music sounded. He supported blended services, but only to the extent that they kept churches from splitting. After his 2011 interview, Gordon said Mark Moring of Christianity Today had observed that contemporary music in churches was on the decline. Gordon said the people who first wanted it are older, and contemporary music had become so common that it was no longer a marketing tool, and no longer new when people wanted what was new. Praise teams, Gordon said, were like performers, but they were in conflict with what the Bible said. And the congregation needed to participate.

== See also ==
- Christian worship
- List of Christian worship music artists
- Contemporary Christian music
- CCLI
