= List of songs recorded by Keith Getty =

Songs by Keith Getty, listed in alphabetical order (current through 2005). Some songs may be known by more than one title. Official lyrics pages at GettyMusic (linked below) also have audio samples.

| Title | Year | Co-author | Album(s) | Related |
|---|---|---|---|---|
| Across the Lands (Hymn for World Missions) | 2003 | Stuart Townend | New Irish Hymns 4 In Christ Alone | Lyrics, Story |
| All My Life | 2002 | Kristyn Getty | Tapestry | — |
| Beneath the Cross (Hymn for Cross and Community) | 2005 | Kristyn Getty | New Irish Hymns 4 In Christ Alone | Lyrics, Story |
| Better Is One Day with Jesus; Based on Luke 10:38-42 | 2005 | Kristyn Getty | Songs That Jesus Said | — |
| Born Where the Shadows Lie | 2004 | Kristyn Getty | New Irish Hymns 3 | Review/Analysis |
| Celtic Christmas Blessing | 2004 | Kristyn Getty | New Irish Hymns 3 | Review/Analysis |
| Christ Has Risen | 2005 | Kristyn Getty | Songs That Jesus Said | — |
| Come, Let Us Sing | 2003 | Kristyn Getty | New Irish Hymns 2 | — |
| Cross of Jesus | 2003 | Kristyn Getty | New Irish Hymns 2 | — |
| Every Breath | 2002 | Kristyn Getty | Tapestry | — |
| Every Promise (Hymn of Response to the Word) | 2005 | Stuart Townend | New Irish Hymns 4 | Story |
| Father in Heaven (The Lord's Prayer); Based on Matthew 6:9-13 | 2002 | Kristyn Getty | Songs That Jesus Said | — |
| Father, We Have Sinned (Repentance) | 2003 | Stuart Townend | New Irish Hymns 2 | Lyrics |
| First Love | 2002 | Kristyn Getty | Tapestry | — |
| Fullness of Grace | 2004 | Kristyn Getty, Stuart Townend | New Irish Hymns 3 | — |
| Glorious Light | 2004 | Kristyn Getty, Ian Hannah | New Irish Hymns 3 | Story |
| God is Here (Instrumental) | 2002 | — | An Evening in Prague | Based on a melody by Lara Martin |
| God of Grace | 2003 | Jonathan Rea | New Irish Hymns 2 | — |
| The Grace Song of Heaven | 2005 | Kristyn Getty | Songs That Jesus Said | — |
| Hear All Creation | 2001 | Margaret Becker | New Irish Hymns | — |
| He Is My Light; Based on John 1:4-5, John 8:12 | 2002 | Kristyn Getty | Songs That Jesus Said | — |
| Holy Child, Who Chose the Hearts of Men | 2004 | Kristyn Getty | New Irish Hymns 3 | Lyrics |
| How Good, How Pleasing (Hymn for Unity) | 2005 | Margaret Becker | New Irish Hymns 4 | — |
| I Am Still Willing | 2002 | Kristyn Getty | Tapestry | — |
| Imagine | 2004 | Kristyn Getty | New Irish Hymns 3 | Review/Analysis |
| I'm Ready to Go; Based on Matthew 28:18-20 | 2005 | Kristyn Getty | Songs That Jesus Said | — |
| In Christ Alone | 2001 | Stuart Townend | New Irish Hymns, In Christ Alone, An Evening in Prague | Lyrics, Story (1), Story (2) |
| In My Father's House; Based on John 14:1-4 | 2005 | Kristyn Getty | Songs That Jesus Said | Liner notes: “For Heather” |
| I Will Trust | 2003 | Kristyn Getty | New Irish Hymns 2 | — |
| Jesus, Draw Me Ever Nearer (May This Journey) | 2001 | Margaret Becker | New Irish Hymns, In Christ Alone | Lyrics |
| Jesus, Ever Abiding Friend | 2003 | Steve Siler | New Irish Hymns 2 | — |
| Jesus Is Lord | 2003 | Stuart Townend | New Irish Hymns 2, An Evening in Prague | Lyrics, Story |
| Jesus, Your Name | 2004 | Kristyn Getty, Ian Hannah | New Irish Hymns 3 | Lyrics |
| Join All the Glorious Names | 2003 | Kristyn Getty | New Irish Hymns 2 | — |
| Joy Has Dawned Upon the World | 2004 | Stuart Townend | New Irish Hymns 3, An Evening in Prague | Lyrics, Review/Analysis |
| Let the Little Children Come; Based on Matthew 19:13-15 | 2005 | Kristyn Getty | Songs That Jesus Said | Liner notes: “For Toby Joel” |
| Lift Up Our Hearts | 2002 | Kristyn Getty | Tapestry | — |
| Light of God (Hymn for the World) | 2005 | Kristyn Getty | New Irish Hymns 4 | Dedicated to C.S. Lewis, Story |
| Like the Starlight (Your Song to Me) | 2001 | Kristyn Getty | New Irish Hymns | — |
| Little Zac; Based on Luke 19:1-10 | 2005 | Kristyn Getty | Songs That Jesus Said | Liner notes: “For Ruslan Leigh” |
| Look to Jesus; Based on John 3, John 4, John 7:37 | 2005 | Kristyn Getty | Songs That Jesus Said | Liner notes: “For Luc Kenya” |
| Look to the Lord | 2002 | Kristyn Getty | Tapestry | — |
| May the Peace of God (Hymn for Benediction) | 2005 | Stuart Townend | New Irish Hymns 4 | Lyrics, Story |
| My Heart Is Filled with Thankfulness | 2003 | Stuart Townend | New Irish Hymns 2 | Story |
| My Hope Rests Firm | 2001 | Richard Creighton | New Irish Hymns | Lyrics |
| No Height, No Depth | 2002 | Kristyn Getty | Tapestry | — |
| Not Ashamed | 2002 | Kristyn Getty | Tapestry | — |
| O For a Closer Walk | 2001 | William Cowper | New Irish Hymns | — |
| O For a Heart (Hymn of Dedication) | 2002 | Margaret Becker | New Irish Hymns 4 | — |
| Oh My Soul | 2003 | Margaret Becker | New Irish Hymns 2 | — |
| Once Upon a Boat; Based on Matthew 8:23-27 | 2005 | Kristyn Getty | Songs That Jesus Said | — |
| Over Fields of Green (My Song Shall Rise to You) | 2001 | Joanne Hogg | New Irish Hymns | — |
| The Power of the Cross (Hymn for Communion) | 2005 | Stuart Townend | New Irish Hymns 4 In Christ Alone | Lyrics, Story, Interview |
| Prologue | 2004 | Tom Howard | New Irish Hymns 3 | — |
| Remember; Based on Matthew 6:25-34 | 2005 | Kristyn Getty | Songs That Jesus Said | Liner notes: “For Alivia Skye” |
| The Risen Christ (O Breath of God, or Doxology) | 2003 | Phil Madeira | New Irish Hymns 2 | — |
| See, What a Morning (Resurrection Hymn) | 2003 | Stuart Townend | New Irish Hymns 2, In Christ Alone | Lyrics, Story |
| Seed You Sow; Based on Luke 8:14-15 | 2005 | Kristyn Getty | Songs That Jesus Said | — |
| Solid Ground | 2002 | Kristyn Getty | Tapestry | — |
| Speak, O Lord (Hymn for the Preaching of the Word) | 2005 | Stuart Townend | New Irish Hymns 4 In Christ Alone | Lyrics, Story |
| Stop and Think; Based on Matthew 7:12, 20:26-27 | 2005 | Kristyn Getty | Songs That Jesus Said | — |
| Store Up Good; Based on Luke 6:45 | 2002 | Kristyn Getty | Songs That Jesus Said | — |
| There Is a Higher Throne | 2002 | Kristyn Getty | Tapestry; In Christ Alone | Lyrics |
| This Fragile Vessel (Communion) | 2001 | Máire Brennan | New Irish Hymns | — |
| Two Little Houses; Based on Matthew 7:24-27 | 2005 | Kristyn Getty | Songs That Jesus Said | — |
| Underneath the Shining Star; Based on Matthew 1-2 | 2003 | Kristyn Getty | Songs That Jesus Said | — |
| When Trials Come (Hymn on Suffering) | 2005 | Kristyn Getty | New Irish Hymns 4 | Lyrics, Story |
| Who Do You Say He Is; Based on Luke 9:18-20 | 2005 | Kristyn Getty | Songs That Jesus Said | Liner notes: “For Victoria Hélène-May” |
| With the Early Morning (Song of the Kingdom) | 2001 | Máire Brennan | New Irish Hymns | — |
| The Wonder of Grace (Orchestral Hymn Meditation); Medley of: “Father, We Have Sinned,” “Fullness of Grace,” “This Fragile Vessel” | 2005 | — | New Irish Hymns 4 | Story |
| You Are the Shepherd; Based on John 10:3-5,14-15 | 2002 | Kristyn Getty | Songs That Jesus Said | Liner notes: “For Melissa” |
| You Have Chosen Us | 2002 | Kristyn Getty | Tapestry | — |
| You Know; Based on Matthew 10:29-31 | 2005 | Kristyn Getty | Songs That Jesus Said | — |
| Your Glory Be Ever Known (Hymn for Opening a Service) | 2005 | Margaret Becker | New Irish Hymns 4 | — |
| Your Hand, O God, Has Guided (One Church, One Faith) | 2001 | E.H. Plumptre | New Irish Hymns | Lyrics |
| Your Song to Me | 2002 | Kristyn Getty | Tapestry | — |
