= Keith & Kristyn Getty =

Northern Irish Christian duo

- Also known as: The Gettys; Getty Music
- Origin: Northern Ireland
- Genres: Modern hymns; contemporary worship music; Irish folk music
- Years active: 2004–present
- Label: Getty Music
- Website: gettymusic.com

Keith & Kristyn Getty are a musical duo from Northern Ireland who perform hymns and other Christian music. They are best known for the 2001 hymn "In Christ Alone", co-written with Stuart Townend. They are additionally best known for the 2024 contemporary Easter hymn "Christus Victor (Amen)” co-written by Matt Papa, Texas native Matt Boswell and Nashville, Tennessee's Bryan Fowler.

Other well-known hymns in the Getty Music catalog include "Rejoice", "The Lord Almighty Reigns", "His Mercy Is More", "He Will Hold Me Fast", "The Power of the Cross", "The Lord Is My Salvation", "By Faith", and "Speak O Lord". The Gettys have recorded 26 albums and have been nominated for a Grammy Award, as well as winning two Dove Awards. In 2017, Christianity Today named the Gettys "preeminent" hymn writers who have "changed the way evangelicals worship".

The couple run Getty Music, a record label and publishing house in addition to an education program for developing hymn writers and worship leaders. In 2020, the Gettys founded the Getty Music Foundation which provides resources to churches and families, especially resources pertaining to theology and education in congregational singing. They have four children.

== Formation and members ==
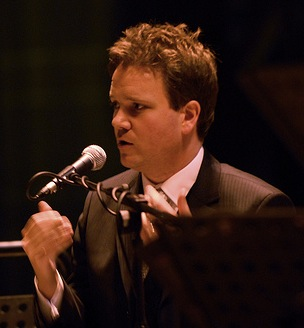
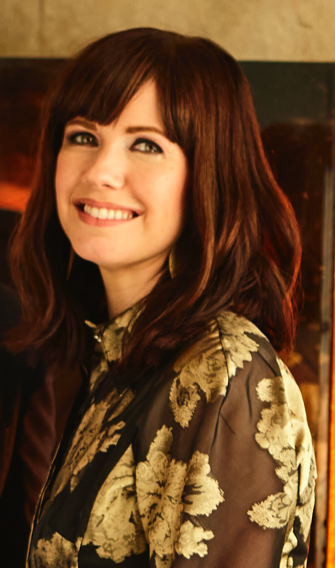
Keith & Kristyn Getty

Kristyn Getty's uncle John Lennox, introduced the couple to each other and the pair soon began writing songs together. They worked with several organizations and in projects in Northern Ireland. The Gettys were married in 2004, moving to Switzerland and working at an international church in Geneva. They then moved to Cleveland, Ohio and were based in Parkside Church with Alistair Begg for four years. They moved again to Nashville in 2010.

=== Keith Getty ===
Julian Keith Getty OBE (born 16 December 1974 (age 51)) was born in Lisburn, Northern Ireland to Helen Getty (née Irwin), a piano teacher, and John Getty, an organist. He studied music at St Chad's College at Durham University in Durham, England, in 1993. He enrolled in private conducting lessons with Alan Hazeldine in London and later in 1996 at the Tanglewood Music Center in Lenox, Massachusetts.

=== Kristyn Getty ===
Kristyn Elizabeth Rebekah Getty (née Lennox, born 22 May 1980 (age 46)) was born in Belfast, Northern Ireland. She is the daughter of Gilbert Lennox and Heather Lennox (née Wright). She is the niece of John Lennox, a mathematician. In 1999, she studied English literature and ethnomusicology at Queen's University of Belfast (1999–2003) in Belfast. Kristyn was a member of various local bands during her early career, before meeting Keith Getty and beginning to write music. Her first song to be published was titled "Your Song to Me," which was released on her album with Keith, under her maiden name Kristyn Lennox.

== Musical career ==
"In Christ Alone" was released in 2001 on New Irish Hymns, featuring vocalists Máire Brennan, Margaret Becker, and Joanne Hogg. The song gained popularity. It was No. 1 on the United Kingdom CCLI charts by 2006, and in January 2009, it was still No. 1 in the UK, No. 2 in Australia, No. 7 in Canada, and No. 15 in the United States. In 2013, "In Christ Alone" was played during the enthronement of Justin Welby, England's 105th Archbishop of Canterbury. "In Christ Alone" has been covered by numerous Christian and Celtic performers, including Natalie Grant, Lauren Daigle, Jim Brickman, Owl City, the Gaither Vocal Band, Alison Krauss, and Newsboys. The Gettys have also performed for former President George W. Bush, South Korean President Lee Myung-bak, and former Vice President Mike Pence.

=== In Christ Alone album ===
The duo's debut release was In Christ Alone, released in 2006. This record was a collection of ten hymns remade with Kristyn as the vocalist.

After distribution of approximately 200,000 units, In Christ Alone was nominated for a Dove Award in 2007. "The Risen Christ", a choral collection based on the album, was also nominated for a Dove Award in 2009.

=== Awaken the Dawn album ===
In 2008, Awaken the Dawn was the duo's second album. The album was nominated in the 41st GMA Dove Awards for "Praise and Worship Album of the Year". Awaken the Dawn introduced a more "worship band" approach as Keith and Kristyn Getty started touring and performing their music to an American audience. The album was produced by Phil Naish with string arrangements by Rob Mathes, and the contributions of rhythm musicians in Nashville. With a distribution of approximately 110,000 units, Awaken the Dawn was nominated for a Dove Award in 2009.

=== Joy – An Irish Christmas album ===
In 2011, the Gettys released Joy: An Irish Christmas. The album is dedicated to their daughter, Eliza Joy, born that year. The album developed into a touring Christmas show. "Irish Christmas" is performed annually at Carnegie Hall in Manhattan, New York and was performed at the John F. Kennedy Center for the Performing Arts in Washington, D.C.

=== 2012–2020 releases ===
In 2012, The Gettys released Hymns for the Christian Life, a collection of music strongly portraying the Gettys move to Nashville. The album is personal, both in terms of writing more hymns on how the gospel speaks to the issues of everyday life and moving away to a more acoustic musical style blending the two cultures in which they live— from Northern Ireland and American folk music. The album was produced by Charlie Peacock and Ed Cash. It features guests artists including Alison Krauss, Ricky Skaggs, and Máire Brennan. In 2014, The Greengrass Sessions EP was released as a supplement containing additional songs used on the Hymns for the Christian Life tour. It is a limited edition EP with recordings of the live touring band.

The pair first performed at Royal Albert Hall in 2012 for the 40th anniversary of Prom Praise with the All Souls Orchestra and returned to the same venue in 2022 for the 50th anniversary concert. In 2013, they performed at the Ryman Auditorium in Nashville for the first time for a Saint Patrick's Day concert. In the spring of 2013, the National Conference of The Gospel Coalition was held in Orlando, Florida. The Gettys arranged the music at the event with traditional and modern hymns, including several selections from their own catalog. It became a live album as well as a printed songbook. The album was produced by Ed Cash and features 13 previously released songs.

In 2016, the Gettys began work on their next album Facing a Task Unfinished. The album's title track is the hymn "Facing a Task Unfinished", which the Gettys were invited to re-write by OMF International from the original by Frank Houghton in 1931. The album was recorded at Ocean Way in Nashville. It features special guests Ladysmith Black Mambazo, Fernando Ortega, John Patitucci, and Chris Tomlin. Facing a Task Unfinished was released on 17 June 2016. In 2018, Keith and Kristyn performed at British Parliament's annual National Prayer Breakfast at Westminster Hall. They led a worship service, singing songs including "Behold The Lamb" and "In Christ Alone". Former UK prime minister Theresa May was in the audience, and the event was introduced by the former Speaker of the House of Commons, John Bercow.

In May 2019, the Gettys announced via their Facebook page an album named after the Christian worship hymn His Mercy Is More. The album features Getty Music partners Matt Papa and Matt Boswell and came out in August 2019. In 2019 and 2020, TBN aired the program Sing! An Irish Christmas during the Christmas season. The program featured the Gettys as well as Boswell, Matt Papa, and other performers. On 4 September 2020, the Gettys released the album Evensong (Hymns and Lullabies at the Close of Day), which features lullabies written by the Gettys as well as various other hymns. The album is a product of collaboration between the Gettys and various artists including Vince Gill, Heather Headley, Ellie Holcomb, and Skye Peterson, daughter of musician and author Andrew Peterson. In its debut week, it debuted at No. 1 on both the Top Christian Albums chart and the Kid Albums chart

=== Confessio album ===
On 29 October 2021, Keith and Kristyn Getty released the album Confessio: Irish American Roots, which includes traditional and original hymns arranged in Celtic and American folk styles. The album featured collaborations with Ricky Skaggs, Alison Krauss, Kirk Whalum, Dana Masters, Jordyn Shellhart, and Sandra McCracken. The album was nominated for a Grammy in the category Best Roots Gospel Album at the 2023 Grammy Awards.

=== Christ Our Hope in Life and Death album ===
On 28 April 2023, Keith and Kristyn Getty released the album Christ Our Hope in Life and Death, named after the song with the same title. The album, consisting mainly of original worship songs and hymns, featured collaborations with Michael W. Smith, Rend Collective, Shane & Shane, Laura Story, Skye Peterson, Matt Boswell, and Matt Papa.

== Style ==
The Gettys have been influenced by the work of musicians such as Irish traditional musicians, George Gershwin and Johann Sebastian Bach. Their music has been influenced by folk music and classical music and their lyrics incorporate techniques used in contemporary songwriting and standard hymnody.

In reference to his songwriting and musical performance, Keith Getty wrote in 2015: "I do not pretend to be qualified to write a theological treatise on this particular subject. Congregational singing is a holy act, and as I organize my thoughts, I hear my old pastor, Alistair Begg, reminding me that in our song worship, we have to be spiritually alive..."

== Tours ==
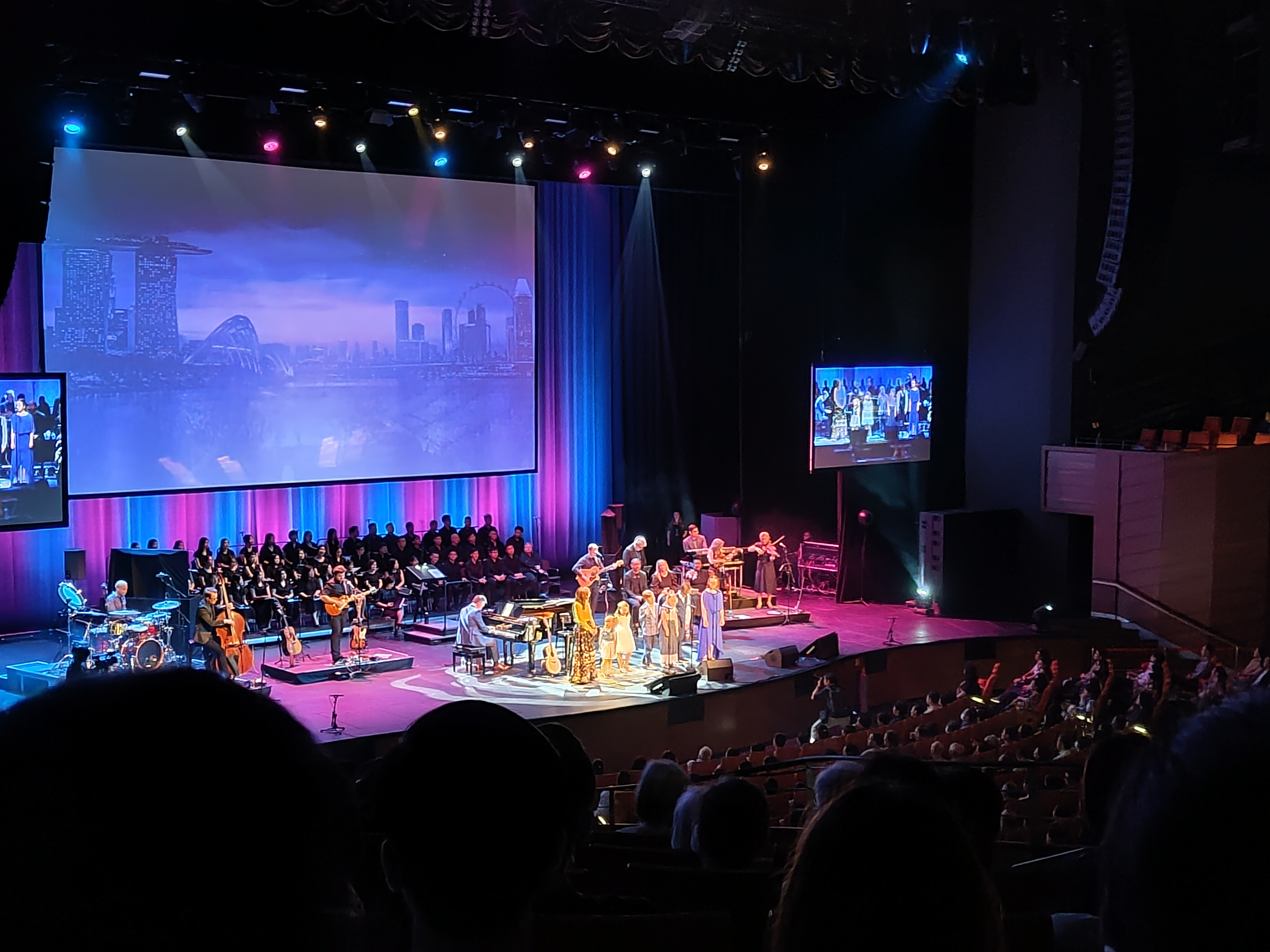
The Gettys performing at The Star Theatre in Singapore as part of the Sing! Asia tour in 2023

=== Joy – An Irish Christmas and Sing! An Irish Christmas ===
In 2010, Tom Bledsoe invited Keith and Kristyn Getty to join a special Christmas celebration with George Beverly Shea and Cliff Barrows. Billy Graham was the speaker. The Gettys prepared 30 minutes of music from their album Joy: An Irish Christmas for the first evening. Their segment was expanded to a fuller evening of music later presented to many churches in 2010.

By 2011, Joy - An Irish Christmas was developed into a full-length album and a month-long concert tour. The tour returned in December 2012. Irish Christmas went on hiatus in 2013 as Keith and Kristyn awaited the birth of their second daughter. The tour went to North America in 2014 culminating with a performance at Carnegie Hall with Ricky Skaggs as a special guest. 2015's Joy - An Irish Christmas Tour went to 20 cities across the southeastern United States. The Gettys were joined by guest artists John Patitucci and Sally Lloyd-Jones in New York City, as well as Buddy Greene and Skaggs at The Fox Theatre and the Schermerhorn Symphony Center, with astronaut Butch Wilmore as a special guest at the tour's final stop in Nashville.

=== Hymns for the Christian Life American & Celtic Tours ===
The duo along with others toured the UK in 2012 during their The Northern Celtic Islands Tour. Guest performers included Stuart Townend, New Scottish Choir and Orchestra, Jonathan Rea, New Irish Arts, and Dr. Noël Tredinnick. In 2013, Keith and Kristyn embarked on the Hymns for the Christian Life Tour throughout North America.

== Personal life ==
Keith and Kristyn Getty were introduced to each other in 2002 by Kristyn's uncle, John Lennox. After dating for two years, the Gettys married on 16 June 2004 in Armagh, Northern Ireland. They have four children.

They divide their time living in Portstewart, Northern Ireland and Nashville.

== Partial Discography ==
=== As Keith Getty & Kristyn Lennox ===
- Tapestry (2002)
- New Irish Hymns 2: Father, Son, and Holy Spirit (2003) with Margaret Becker, Joanne Hogg

=== As Keith & Kristyn Getty ===
- New Irish Hymns 3: Incarnation (2004) with Becker and Hogg
- New Irish Hymns 4: Hymns for the Life of the Church (2005) with Becker
- Songs That Jesus Said (2005), a collection of songs for children
- The Apostles' Creed (2006)
- Modern Hymns Live (2006)
- In Christ Alone (2007)
- Prom Praise (2008) featured guest with the All Souls Orchestra; recorded live at Royal Albert Hall in London
- Keswick Live (2008) with Kristyn Getty, Stuart Townend, and Steve James, recorded at the 2008 Keswick Convention in Keswick, England
- Awaken the Dawn (2009)
- Joy - An Irish Christmas (2011)
- Hymns for the Christian Life (2012)
- Modern and Traditional Hymns: Live at the Gospel Coalition (2013)
- Facing a Task Unfinished (2016)
- Sing! Live at The Getty Music Worship Conference (2017)
- Sing! Psalms : Ancient & Modern (Live at The Getty Music Worship Conference) (2018)
- The North Coast Sessions (2018)
- His Mercy Is More - The Hymns of Matt Boswell and Matt Papa (2019)
- Sing! An Irish Christmas (Live at the Grand Ole Opry House) (2019)
- Sing! Global (Live at the Getty Music Worship Conference) (2020)
- Evensong: A Collection of Hymns and Lullabies at Close of Day (2020)
- Sing! Global (Live at the Getty Music Worship Conference) (2021)
- Confessio - Irish American Roots (2021)
- Sing! Live in Singapore (2022)
- Sing! Christ Our Hope in Life and Death (Live at the Getty Music Worship Conference) (2022)
- Sing! The Great Commission World Tour LIVE (2023)
- Christ Our Hope in Life and Death (2023)
- Sing! From Generation to Generation (Live at the Getty Music Worship Conference) (2025)

== Books ==
- Getty, Kristyn; Getty, Keith (2017). Sing! How Worship Transforms Your Life, Family, and Church. Broadman & Holman. ISBN 9781462742660.

== Awards and honours ==
Keith has received two honorary doctorates: one from Lancaster Bible College in 2011, and another from Dallas Baptist University in Dallas in 2021. Kristyn received an honorary doctorate from Dallas Baptist University in 2023. In 2012, The British Hymn Society named "In Christ Alone" as one of the top Five Hymns of All Time.

In 2018, Keith was appointed an Officer of the Order of the British Empire (OBE) by Elizabeth II, becoming the first church musician of the modern era to be given the award for contributions to music and hymn writing. In August 2019, Lisburn and Castlereagh City Council (LCCC) approved a motion to bestow its highest civic order on Keith and Kristyn Getty after a proposal by Alderman Allan Ewart. The award of Freedom of the City of Lisburn and Castlereagh was conferred on 1 June 2023.

In 2019, "In Christ Alone" was voted as the third most popular hymn in Britain as announced on the BBC program Songs of Praise, making it the only modern hymn to be included in the top ten. In 2020, their children's album Evensong topped Billboard's Kids Album Chart, moving the Frozen soundtrack from the top position.

Year	Association	Category	Nominated work	Result	Ref
2018	Christian Book Award	Best New Author(s)	Sing! How Worship Transforms Your Life, Family, and Church	Nominated	
2018	Christian Book Award	Best Ministry Resources	Sing! How Worship Transforms Your Life, Family, and Church	Nominated	
2019	GMA Dove Award	Inspirational Album of the Year	The North Coast Sessions	Won	
2022	GMA Dove Award	Children's Album of the Year	Getty Kids Hymnal: Hymns from Home	Won	
2022	Grammy Award	Best Roots Gospel Album	Confessio - Irish American Roots	Nominated	

== Controversy ==
In 2013, the Presbyterian Committee on Congregational Song in the United States sought permission to include "In Christ Alone" in a hymnal with a modification of the lyrics: "Till on that cross as Jesus died, the wrath of God was satisfied" to instead say, "Till on that cross as Jesus died, the love of God was magnified". Keith Getty and co-author Stuart Townsend rejected the request for modification and the Committee declined to include the song in its hymnal. The dean of Beeson Divinity School of Samford University in Homewood, Alabama, Timothy George, published an article criticizing the committee's attempt to remove the controversial doctrine of the wrath of God from the song. The topic of George's article became popular and was eventually adapted by reporters from USA Today, The Washington Post, and other major publications.
