= Apostles Creed (album) =

The Apostles Creed

Compilation album by Various
- Released: 2006
- Genre: Celtic music, Christian music
- Label: Kingsway
- Producer: John Hartley

The Apostles Creed is an album of songs by Keith Getty and Stuart Townend, featuring many guest performers assembled by producer John Hartley. As its title suggests, the songs reflect various aspects of the Christian Apostles' Creed. All songs are by Getty and Townend, except "Merciful God," which is also by Kristyn Getty.

== Track listing ==
1. "Let the Earth Resound in Praise" performed by Christine Denté
2. "In Christ Alone" performed by Susan Ashton
3. "Jesus Is Lord" performed by Sarah Sadler
4. "Joy Has Dawned" performed by Steve Garrett
5. "My Heart is Filled with Thankfulness" performed by Christine Denté
6. "See, What a Morning (Resurrection Hymn)" performed by JP
7. "You're the Word of God the Father (Across the Lands)" performed by Brenton Brown
8. "Merciful God" performed by Tammy Trent
9. "Holy Spirit" performed by Kristyn Getty
10. "O Church, Arise" performed by Tim Hughes
11. "Oh to See the Dawn (The Power of the Cross)" performed by JP
12. "Lord, We Wait" performed by Derri Daugherty
