= New Irish Hymns (album series) =

New Irish Hymns is a series of Christian-themed albums created and produced by Keith Getty and Stuart Townend. Each album is performed by different singers:

1. New Irish Hymns - (subtitled In Christ Alone: New Hymns for Prayer and Worship) - sung by Máire Brennan, Margaret Becker and Joanne Hogg
2. New Irish Hymns 2 (subtitled Father, Son, and Holy Spirit) - sung by Margaret Becker, Joanne Hogg, and Kristyn Lennox (Getty)
3. New Irish Hymns 3 (subtitled Incarnation) - sung by Margaret Becker, Kristyn Getty and Joanne Hogg
4. New Irish Hymns 4 (subtitled Hymns for the Life of the Church - sung by Margaret Becker, Kristyn Getty and Joanne Hogg
