= In Christ Alone (disambiguation) =

In Christ Alone is the English translation of Solus Christus, a slogan of Protestant theology. It may also refer to:

== Songs ==
- "In Christ Alone" (Keith Getty and Stuart Townend song), a Christian song (2001). The song is subject of many covers.
- "In Christ Alone" (Brian Littrell song), 2005

== Albums ==
(in chronological order)

- In Christ Alone: New Hymns for Prayer and Worship, a 2002 Worship Together album (USA release) also known as New Irish Hymns (original UK release)
- Greatest Hits: In Christ Alone, a 2006 album by Michael English
- In Christ Alone, a 2007 album by Keith & Kristyn Getty
- In Christ Alone: Modern Hymns of Worship, a 2008 album by Bethany Dillon and Matt Hammitt

== Books ==
- In Christ Alone: Living the Gospel Centered Life, 2007 book by Sinclair B. Ferguson
