= Erin O'Donnell =

American Contemporary Christian music singer

Erin O'Donnell (born Erin McDonald, March 11, 1971 in Severn, Maryland) is an American Contemporary Christian music singer. She grew up near Jacksonville, Florida before going to the University of Miami Frost School of Music, where she got her degree in Jazz Performance and where she met her husband, Brad O'Donnell, with whom she began her career (he was her songwriter and bassist) and who is now a Christian music A&R executive. They have two daughters, and a son. They currently live in Nashville, Tennessee. O'Donnell is also one of the first recording artists to be signed through the internet.

== Discography ==
- A Scrapbook of Sorts (1996: Cadence Communications | BMG Records)
- Scratching The Surface (1998: Cadence Communications | BMG Records)
- No Place So Far (2001: Myrrh Records)
- Wide, Wide World (2003: Inpop Records)
- Christmas Time Is Here (2004: Inpop Records)
- No Better Place (2006: Independent)

== Side projects ==
- Sing Over Me: Worship Songs and Lullabies, 2006
- Prayer of Jabez, 2002 (winner of the 2002 GMA Dove Awards for Special Event Album of the Year with Sarah Sadler, Margaret Becker, Geoff Moore, Steve Reischl, Erin O'Donnell, Adrienne Liesching, Jamie Rowe, Phil Keaggy, Rebecca St. James, Michael Tait, Jill Phillips, Kevin Max; John Hartley, David Zaffiro; ForeFront)
- The Mercy Project, 2000
