= Falling Forward =

Falling Forward may refer to:

- Falling Forward (Sandi Patty album), 2007
- Falling Forward (Margaret Becker album), 1998
- Falling Forward (Julia Fordham album), 1994
