= Kelly Minter =

American musician

Kelly Minter (born September 23, 1975) is a Christian worship leader, author, speaker, songwriter, and musician.

== Early life and education ==
The daughter of a pastor, Minter grew up in Northern Virginia and as a teenager was more interested in sports than music. When she was a senior in high school, Minter was offered and then lost a college basketball scholarship. To help her recover from that disappointment, Minter started playing the guitar.

== Music ==
In 1999, Minter moved to Nashville, Tennessee. In 2001 she started her career as a recording artist with her major-label debut, Good Day. Her next album, the 2003 Wrestling with Angels included the song “This Is My Offering,” which went to number one on the charts.

Minter has toured with various Christian artists, including Sonicflood, Bebo Norman, and Watermark. She counts Margaret Becker her mentor in the music industry. Songs Minter has written have been recorded by Point of Grace, Joy Williams, Sonicflood, Sandi Patty, and Margaret Becker.

== Religion ==
After the 2003 album, Minter ended management and record ties and, eventually, began leading worship in churches. She speaks at Christian events, including the Kingsway worship conference in England and the LifeWay Christian Resources After Eve event. She teaches from the Christian Standard Bible.

Minter wrote a teen Bible study called Hannah’s One Wish, and authors a Bible study series with LifeWay Christian Resources called "The Living Room Series".No Other Gods, a Bible study and the first title in that series, was released in August 2007. She also wrote a longer book under the title No Other Gods title, released in 2008.

She has written about her missionary work with people living on the Amazon River; of her book, Wherever the River Runs: How a Forgotten People Renewed My Hope in the Gospel (2014), Publishers Weekly wrote "Though Minter can seem self-absorbed at times, particularly early on, her ability to be honest about her struggles to relate what she was learning in the Amazon to her need for significance proves winsome".

== Works ==
=== Books ===
- Minter, Kelly (2004). Water Into Wine: Hope for the Miraculous in the Struggle of the Mundane. Doubleday Religious Publishing. ISBN 1-57856-797-1.
- ——— (2007). No Other Gods: Confronting Our Modern-Day Idols. LifeWay. ISBN 978-1-4158-5256-9.
- ——— (2007). Hannah's One Wish: A Bible Study for Teen Girls. LifeWay Press. ISBN 978-1-4158-5254-5.
- ——— (2008). No Other Gods: Confronting Our Modern Day Idols. David C Cook. ISBN 978-0-7814-4897-0.
- ——— (2009). Ruth: loss, love & legacy. LifeWay Christian Resources. ISBN 978-1415866931.
- ——— (2012). Nehemiah: A Heart That Can Break. Lifeway Church Resources. ISBN 978-1-4158-7342-7.
- ——— (2014). What Love Is: The Letters of 1, 2, 3 John. Lifeway Christian Resources. ISBN 9781430031550.
- ——— (2016). All Things New: A Study on 2 Corinthians. LifeWay Christian Resources. ISBN 9781430055044.

=== Discography ===
Studio

- Wheels Of Change • Independent (1997)
- Good Day • Word (2001)
- Wrestling the Angels • Cross Driven Records (2003)
- Finer Day • Kingsway (2008)
- Loss, Love, and Legacy • Lifeway (2009)

Contributions to

- Love Divine • Kingsway (2007) - multi-artist CD
- Live at the Abbey • Kingsway (2007) - multi-artist CD & DVD
