= Wrestling the Angels =

Studio album by Kelly Minter
- Released: October 1, 2003
- Studio: Dark Horse Studios, Franklin, TN; The Castle, Franklin, TN
- Genre: Religious/Pop
- Length: 42:00
- Label: Cross Driven Records
- Producer: Margaret Becker; Paul Buono

Kelly Minter chronology
Good Day (2001)	Wrestling the Angels (2003)	Finer Day (2008)

Professional ratings
Review scores
Source	Rating
AllMusic	3/5 stars
Cross Rhythms	7/10 squares

Wrestling the Angels is Kelly Minter's second studio album, third overall as she had previously released an independent album titled Wheels Of Change in 1997. According to Minter, the album's title, Wrestling the Angels, was inspired by her reading of Jacob's struggle in Genesis.

== Critical reception ==
Ashleigh Kittle of AllMusic begins her review by saying, "Singer/songwriter Kelly Minter released her sophomore project Wrestling the Angels in the fall of 2003. Produced by Margaret Becker and Paul Buono, the acoustic pop album is similar in style to the early music of Susan Ashton as well as (Margaret) Becker's later projects."

Tony Cummings of Cross Rhythms gives this album 7 out of a possible 10 and concludes his revies with, "Maybe not the most innovative release to emerge from the US CCM but definitely a good showcase for a singer/songwriter with a heart for mission."

Crosswalk's interview with Minter mention's this about the album, "Wrestling the Angels, the organic-pop recording produced by (Margaret) Becker and Paul Buono, paves the way for Minter to pick up where she left off — this time more weathered and content to follow the simple advice Kim Hill offered her close to a decade ago: "Bloom where you’re planted."

== Track listing ==
All tracks are written by Kelly Minter and Paul Buono, unless otherwise noted.

No.	Title	Writer(s)	Length
1.	"This is My Offering"		3:49
2.	"Open Up the Sky"		3:54
3.	"Shade"	Minter; Mary Danna	3:43
4.	"Wrestling the Angels"	Minter; Margaret Becker	4:05
5.	"Love Has Come"	Minter; Steven Leiweke	3:21
6.	"Say the Word"	Minter; Danna	3:28
7.	"Miss You Here"	Minter	3:12
8.	"Walk Me Trough"		3:57
9.	"Yet Will I Praise"		4:44
10.	"Captives Dance"		4:01
11.	"You're Listening"		3:46
Total length:			42:00

== Musicians ==
"This is My Offering"

- Kelly Minter: Vocals, Acoustic, High Strung & Electric Guitars, Background Vocals
- Ken Lewis: Drums & Percussion
- Chris Donohue: Bass & Electric Guitars
- Keith Getty: String Arrangements
- Prague Symphony Orchestra: Strings
- Jonathan Noel: Keyboards
- Steven Leiweke: Electric Guitars & Programming
- Peter Penrose: Background Vocals
- Cheri Bebout: Background Vocals
- Margaret Becker: Background Vocals
- Kathy Shooster: Background Vocals

"Open Up the Sky"

- Kelly Minter: Vocals, Acoustic, Background Vocals
- Dan Needham: Drums & Percussion
- Mark Hill: Bass
- George Cocchini: Electric Guitar
- Paul Buono: Guitars, Electric Sitar, Keyboards, Programming
- Love Sponge Strings: David Davidson, Monisa Angell, David Angell & Anthony LaMarchina
- Paul Buono & David Davidson: String Arrangement

"Shade"

- Kelly Minter: Vocals, Acoustic, High Strung & Electric Guitars, Background Vocals
- Ken Lewis: Drums & Percussion
- Chris Donohue: Bass & Electric Guitars, Whistle
- Keith Getty: String Arrangements
- The Prague Symphony Orchestra: Strings
- Jonathan Noel: Keyboards
- Steven Leiweke: Electric Guitars
- Peter Penrose: Background Vocals
- Cheri Bebout: Background Vocals
- Margaret Becker: Background Vocals
- Kathy Shooster: Background Vocals

"Wrestling the Angels"

- Kelly Minter: Vocals, Acoustic Guitar, Background Vocals
- Dan Needham: Drums & Percussion
- Matt Pierson: Bass
- George Cocchini: Electric Guitar
- Paul Buono: Dobro, Keyboards, Programming
- Blair Masters: B3
- Steve Short: Bell Tree
- Strings: David Davidson, Monisa Angell, David Angell & Anthony LaMarchina
- Paul Buono & David Davidson: String Arrangement

"Love Has Come"

- Kelly Minter: Vocals, Acoustic, Background Vocals
- Dan Needham: Drums & Percussion
- Mark Hill: Bass
- George Cocchini: Electric Guitar
- Paul Buono: Guitars, Keyboards, Programming

"Say the Word"

- Kelly Minter: Vocals, Acoustic Guitars, Background Vocals
- Ken Lewis: Drums & Percussion
- Chris Donohue: Bass & Electric Guitars, Accordion, Whistle
- Keith Getty: String Arrangements
- The Prague Symphony Orchestra: Strings
- Gary Burnette: Classical Guitar
- Paul Nelson: Cello
- Jonathan Noel: Keyboards
- Steven Leiweke: Electric Guitars
- Cheri Bebout: Background Vocals
- Margaret Becker: Background Vocals
- Kathy Shooster: Background Vocals

"Miss You Here"

- Kelly Minter: Vocals, Acoustic Guitar, Background Vocals
- Dan Needham: Drums & Percussion
- Matt Pierson: Upright Bass
- George Cocchini: Electric Guitar
- Paul Buono: Banjo, Mandolin, Keyboards, B3
- Blair Masters: Rhodes

"Walk Me Trough"

- Kelly Minter: Vocals, Acoustic Guitar, Background Vocals
- Dan Needham: Drums & Percussion
- Matt Pierson: Bass
- George Cocchini: Electric Guitar
- Sarah Jahn: Background Vocals
- Paul Buono: Guitars, Keyboards, Programming, Background Vocals
- Steven Leiweke: Melotron

"Yet Will I Praise"

- Kelly Minter: Vocals, Acoustic Guitar, Background Vocals
- Dan Needham: Drums & Percussion
- Matt Pierson: Bass
- George Cocchini: Electric Guitar
- Paul Buono: Guitars, B3, Keyboards, Programming
- Love Sponge Strings: David Davidson, Monisa Angell, David Angell & Anthony LaMarchina
- Paul Buono & David Davidson: String Arrangement
- Peter Penrose: Background Vocals
- Cheri Bebout: Background Vocals
- Margaret Becker: Background Vocals

"Captives Dance"

- Kelly Minter: Vocals, Acoustic Guitar, Background Vocals
- Dan Needham: Drums & Percussion
- Matt Pierson: Bass
- George Cocchini: Electric Guitar
- Paul Buono: Guitars, Keyboards, Piano, Programming
- Blair Masters: Piano

"You're Listening"

- Kelly Minter: Vocals
- Paul Buono: Nylon Guitar
- John Catchings: Cello

== Production ==
- Producer: Margaret Becker (tracks 1, 3, 6)
- Producer: Paul Buono (tracks 2, 4–5, 7–11)
- Engineer: Rob Burrell
- Assistant Engineer: Mike Modesto
- Additional Engineering: Steve Short and Stephen Leiweke
- Additional Engineering: Tone Chaperon and Electric Guitar Production by George Cocchini
- Mixer: Jim Dineen at The Hideout, Franklin, Tennessee
- Mastered by Hank Williams at Mastermix, Nashville, Tennessee
- Management: Pamela Muse at Muse and Associates, Inc.

Track information and credits verified from the album's liner notes.
