= Matt Papa =

American musician

- Born: July 3, 1983 (age 43); Gainesville, Georgia, U.S.
- Genres: Christian rock; worship music; Reformed worship music
- Occupations: Singer-songwriter; musician
- Instruments: Vocals; guitar; piano
- Years active: 2005–present
- Labels: Maranatha! Music; Centricity Music; 2 Cities Music; The Summit Church; independent record label; TheReward.org
- Website: mattpapa.com

Matt Papa (born July 3, 1983) is an American contemporary Christian music singer, songwriter, hymn writer, author, and worship leader. In 2009, his album Your Kingdom Come charted #46 on the Billboard Top Christian Albums and #33 on the Top Heatseekers chart. He released "Church Songs", an EP, in October 2016. He has worked extensively with Keith & Kristyn Getty and written several songs with Matt Boswell including the 2024 contemporary worship Easter hymn "Christus Victor (Amen").

== Early life ==
Since he was a child, Papa has always been interested in music. He met his youth minister when he was in his teen years, led to him becoming a Christian.

== Career ==
Papa began as a worship leader at The Summit Church in Raleigh, North Carolina. He was on their staff for four years and then began studying at Southeastern Baptist Theological Seminary in Wake Forest (for a master's degree). For a time, he was also the worship and arts director at Christ Covenant Church in Atlanta.

In 2009, Papa and Matt Boswell, pastor of The Trails Church in Celina, Texas north of Dallas, began writing hymns together including “Come Behold the Wondrous Mystery” and “Christ the Sure and Steady Anchor”. Boswell wrote the lyrics, while Papa came up with the melodies. By 2016, Papa had released nine albums. In 2019, Papa and Boswell released their first album together: His Mercy Is More –The Hymns Of Matt Boswell and Matt Papa. The album debuted at No. 1 on Nielsen's Christian Praise and Worship Chart and No. 3 on the Billboard Christian Contemporary Chart. The album was nominated for a 2020 Dove Award (best inspirational album) and their song "His Mercy Is More" was nominated for best inspirational song. The vocal group Selah won in both categories. On October 23, 2020, Papa and Boswell released a new song, "Psalm 150".

In 2021, Papa and his wife, Lauren wrote a song together, "Almost Home". Later in 2021, it was announced that Papa would serve as artist-in-residence at Cedarville University in Cedarville, Ohio, southwest of Columbus for the 2021–22 academic year. As artist-in-residence, he gave lectures, led worship at the university, and promoted the university at his concerts and conferences. He was the artist-in-residence that year for Marco Presbyterian Church in Marco Island, Florida. Papa and Boswell then released their second album together Almost Home – The Hymns Of Matt Boswell And Matt Papa (Vol. 2).

== Artistry ==
Papa writes worship music as it allows him to combine his two passions: Christian theology and music. According to him, a good hymn "has a lyrical and theological density, an aesthetic and melodic beauty, and a congregational singability". Keith Getty and Keith Green have been influences for his songwriting.

== Personal life ==
Papa and his wife Lauren have five children and live in Marco Island after moving in from Atlanta. Previously they lived in Raleigh, North Carolina.

== Awards and nominations ==
Award	Year	Recipient	Category	Result	Ref.
Dove Awards	2020	"His Mercy Is More"	Inspirational Recorded Song of the Year	Nominated	
Dove Awards	2020	His Mercy Is More: The Hymns of Matt Boswell and Matt Papa	Inspirational Album of the Year	Nominated	
Dove Awards	2024	Our God Will Go Before Us – The Hymns of Matt Boswell and Matt Papa, Vol 3	Inspirational Album of the Year	Nominated	

== Discography ==
- You Are Good (2006)
- Worship Vol. 1 (2007)
- Your Kingdom Come (2008)
- Scripture Songs & Hymns 1 (2009)
- Your Kingdom Come (2009)
- Scripture Songs & Hymns 2 (2010)
- This Changes Everything (2011)
- Look & Live (2 Cities Music/The Summit Church) (2013)
- Church Songs (2016)
- Songs From The Wilderness (2019)
- His Mercy Is More (2019)

=== Singles ===
Year	Title	Peak Chart Positions	Album
2009	Open Hands	–	Your Kingdom Come
2010	To The Least of These	–	Your Kingdom Come
2011	It Is Finished	–	This Changes Everything
2012	The Reward of His Suffering	–	The Reward of His Suffering (single)
2013	Show Me Your Glory	–	Look & Live
2013	A Pilgrim's Progress (Keep Runnin')	–	Look & Live

== Bibliography ==
In 2014, Papa published a book, Look and Live.

- Look and Live. Bethany House Publishers. 2014. ISBN 9780764212512.
