= An Evening in Prague =

Studio album by Keith Getty, Czech Television Studio Orchestra
- Released: 2005
- Genre: Celtic music, Christian music
- Label: Kingsway
- Producer: Keith Getty & Jonathan McCabe

An Evening in Prague is a symphonic album by Keith Getty—a departure from his catalog of predominantly vocal albums—though it reflects Getty's origins as an arranger and orchestrator for other artists. It is also unique in that it draws material mostly from other songwriters, with only four songs co-authored by Getty.

== Track listing ==
1. God is Here (Prologue)
  (by Keith Getty, based on a melody by Lara Martin)
2. Jesus is Lord
  (by Keith Getty and Stuart Townend)
3. In Christ Alone
  (by Keith Getty and Stuart Townend)
4. Lost in Wonder
  (by Martyn Layzell)
5. Here I Am to Worship
  (by Tim Hughes)
6. Beautiful Savior
  (by Stuart Townend)
7. Joy Has Dawned
  (by Keith Getty and Stuart Townend)
8. The Voice of Hope
  (by Lara Martin)
9. The Father's Song
  (by Matt Redman)
10. How Deep the Father's Love
  (by Stuart Townend)
11. I Will Offer Up My Life
  (by Matt Redman)
12. Jesus, Lover of My Soul
  (by Paul Oakley)
13. Praise the Mighty Name of Jesus
  (by Robert Critchley)

== Credits ==
- Producers: Keith Getty & Jonathan McCabe
- Executive Producer: Stephen Doherty
- Project Coordinator: Gayle Price
- CD design: Andy Colthart
- Conductor: Keith Getty
- Performed by: Czech Television Studio Orchestra
- Recorded by: Milan Jilek at the Czech Television Studios, Prague
- (c) 2005 Kingsway Music
