= The Pilgrim's Progress (film) =

2019 American animated adventure film

- Theatrical release poster
- Directed by: Robert Fernandez
- Written by: Robert Fernandez
- Based on: The Pilgrim's Progress by John Bunyan
- Produced by: Steve Cleary; Robert Fernandez; Chris Jung; Larry Zielke
- Starring: David Thorpe; John Rhys-Davies; Kristyn Getty
- Music by: Michael Dooley
- Distributed by: Fathom Events
- Release date: April 18, 2019
- Running time: 113 minutes
- Country: United States
- Language: English
- Box office: $3.2 million

The Pilgrim's Progress is a 2019 American animated Christian fantasy adventure film written and directed by Robert Fernandez and featuring the voices of David Thorpe, John Rhys-Davies and Kristyn Getty. It is based on John Bunyan's 1678 novel The Pilgrim's Progress.

== Plot ==
In the realm of Apollon, beyond the garden of four rivers and within the region of Abaddon, lies the ancient city of Not-Cursed. Here, Apollyon, the master of corruption, keeps a watchful eye on his workers.

One day, an employer notices the disappearance of an employee and immediately reports it to his superior. Upon investigating the missing worker's home, they discover strange drawings—both unsettling and hopeful. Christian, another worker, learns that the missing man is named Faithful and that he has left for the Celestial City, a place beyond the borders.

That night, Christian is haunted by a nightmare. He turns to a book he found in Faithful’s office and becomes utterly captivated by its words. Convinced of its truth, he warns his family of the city’s impending destruction and urges them to flee with him. His wife, however, dismisses the book as mere fiction and refuses to leave. Heartbroken but resolute, Christian sets out on the same path Faithful took.

Along the way, Christian encounters Evangelist, who encourages him to press forward without turning aside. He then meets Pliable, a man eager to follow him, enticed by the promise of wonders. However, when they fall into the Swamp of Despondency, Pliable loses heart and abandons the journey. Christian is rescued by a man named Help, who warns him that more hardships lie ahead.

Deeper in the forest, Christian meets a man with a top hat called Worldly Wiseman, who conjures illusions of wealth and ease. He misleads Christian to the village of Morality, where the rigid Law of Moses reigns. Overwhelmed by the impossibility of obeying its countless rules, Christian despairs. Evangelist intervenes, explaining that the law cannot save him or lead him to the Celestial City. The enraged villagers attempt to capture them, but they escape.

Continuing on his path, Christian is attacked by bats but is saved by the Gatekeeper. That night, fireflies guide him to the Interpreter’s house, where she teaches him that all who follow the path of light will be protected if they persevere.

On the Path of Patience, Christian is freed from his burdens. Heralds of the King appear, welcoming him as a citizen of the Celestial City and clothing him in a new garment. He then stays at the house of Vigilant, whose four daughters provide him with armor and a sword. Armed for battle, Christian later faces Apollyon, prince of corruption, and emerges victorious.

He reunites with Faithful and meets Evangelist once more, who warns them of the dangers of Vanity Fair. He prophesies that one of them will shed his blood. When they arrive at the fair, the prophecy is fulfilled—Faithful is executed, while Christian is imprisoned, awaiting judgment. While in his cell, he meets Hopeful, a gaoler who secretly opposes their captors. Hopeful manipulates his fellow gaoler and helps Christian escape. The two men journey together, seeking shelter in what turns out to be a giant’s shoe. Captured and imprisoned in the giant’s dungeon, they realize that the giants cannot harm them because of their unshakable hope. This realization enables them to break free.

A Shepherd appears to them, revealing that the Celestial City is close. He urges them to walk together and keep their eyes fixed on the city's light. However, Apollyon, now disguised as an old man, intercepts them and captures them once more. Before he can destroy them, a herald of the King rescues them and leads them to the edge of the sea, where towering waters form a passage.

Hopeful assures Christian that he must enter the water to reach the Celestial City. Though torn by thoughts of his family and loved ones, Christian heeds Evangelist’s advice and steps into the sea. Apollyon makes one last desperate attempt to seize Christian’s soul, but the Shepherd’s blood is shed, light bursts forth, and Apollyon is cast into the depths.

Christian awakens to find the Shepherd welcoming him into the resplendent Celestial City, where Faithful and Hopeful are waiting to greet him.

In the epilogue, Christian’s wife wakes to find a letter beside her bed, revealing that her husband is still alive. Moved to tears, she shares the news with their children. Meanwhile, Apollyon, now a raging dragon, shrieks above their home. The screen fades to black, leaving behind a single message: "To be continued..."

== Cast ==
- David Thorpe as Christian Pilgrim
- John Rhys-Davies as Evangelist
- Kristyn Getty as The Interpreter
- Tristan Beint as Pliable
- Justin Butcher as Hopeful
- Stephen Daltry as The Gatekeeper
- Andy Harrison as Obstinate
- Jasmine Jones as Piety
- Jonathan Keeble as Faithful
- Rachel Marquez as Prudence
- Chris Pavlo as Worldly Wiseman
- Alison Pettit as Cristiana
- Ben Price as Vanity Fair Chief / Judge Hategood
- Lisa Ronaghan as Prudence
- Andrew Wyncott as Apollyon

== Reception ==
On review aggregator Rotten Tomatoes the film has an approval rating of 60% rating.

Cath Clarke of The Guardian gave the film two out of five stars. She criticized the animation, stiff character animation, the amateur theatre dialogue, and for "virtually zero humour." Joyce Slayton of Common Sense Media gave the film two out of five stars as well.

Megan Basham of WORLD Magazine gave the film a more positive write-up, and praised the introduction with Kristyn Getty and some of the scenes, saying they "delight with ingenuity." She said some of the scenes "show budget constraints," but that "these gripes are surprisingly few." Courtney Howard of Variety said, "While this adaptation may not win over any new converts, it does serve as a blessed reminder of faith’s rewards in a seemingly endless, punishing, and dark time." David Aldridge of Radio Times gave the film 3 out of 5, describing the animation as "basic but effective" and that the film was "presumably aimed primarily at kids, yet whose symbolic vision will require considerable explanation from adults."
