= In Christ Alone (Keith Getty and Stuart Townend song) =

Christian song written by Keith Getty and Stuart Townend

- by Keith Getty
- Genre: Contemporary Christian hymn
- Written: 2001
- Text: Stuart Townend
- Meter: 8.8.8.8 D
- Melody: "In Christ Alone"

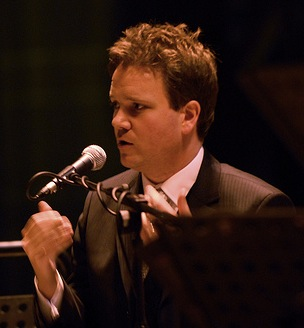
Keith Getty

"In Christ Alone" is a British Christian hymn written by Keith Getty and Stuart Townend, both songwriters of Christian hymns and contemporary worship music in the United Kingdom. The song, with what Getty describes as "a strong very Irish melody", is the first hymn they penned together. The music was by Getty and the original lyrics by Townend. It was composed in 2001.

"In Christ Alone" is considered a Christian credal song for belief in Jesus Christ. The theme of the song is the life, death and resurrection of Christ, and that he is God whom even death cannot hold.

The song is commonly known as "In Christ Alone (My Hope Is Found)" and "In Christ Alone (I Stand)" taking verses from the song. It has become very popular and has been the subject of many cover versions and many language translations.

== Popularity ==
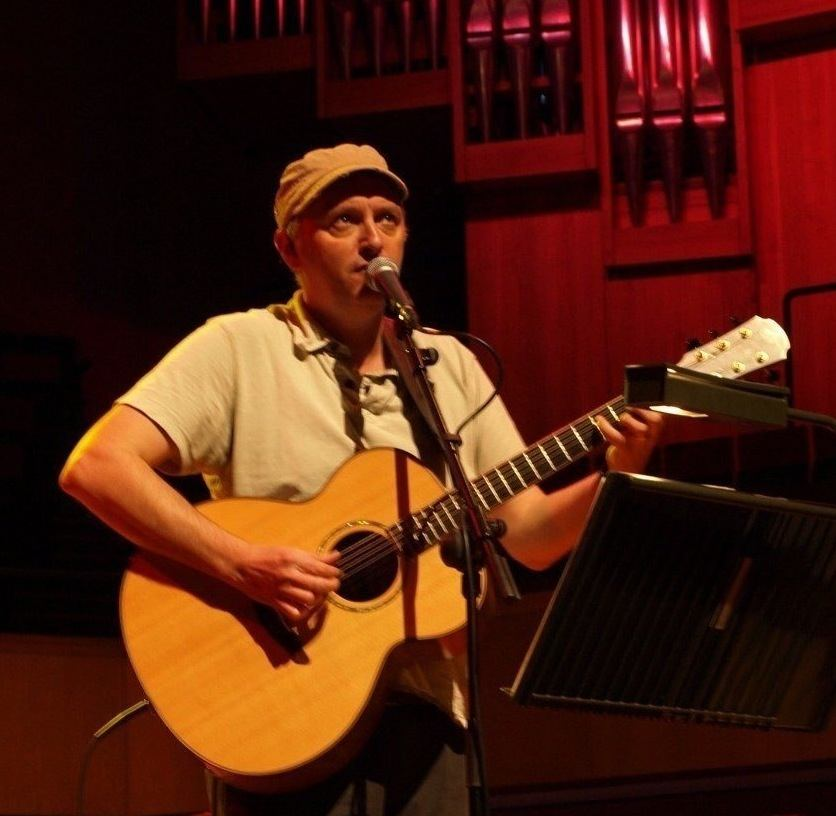
Stuart Townend

The song was composed in 2001 and originally released on the Kingsway album New Irish Hymns, featuring vocalists Máire Brennan, Margaret Becker, and Joanne Hogg. It gained increased popularity first in Ireland and the UK and then in the United States and internationally. In 2002, Stuart Townend, the lyricist of the song, recorded it on his own album Lord of Every Heart By 2005, it had been named by a BBC Songs of Praise survey as the ninth best-loved hymn of all time in the UK and then third in the same poll by the show in 2019; By 2006, it rose to the No. 1 position on the United Kingdom CCLI (Christian Copyright Licensing International) charts. "In Christ Alone" appeared on CCLI's "Top 25 CCLI Songs" American songs list for the first time in the February 2008 report although it had appeared in the CCLI chart for Canada, Australia and New Zealand prior to that.

In 2008, the song was included in the release of Christian Worship: Supplement for the Wisconsin Evangelical Lutheran Synod (WELS). In 2015, the song was listed among the "Fifty Favorite Hymns" in a WELS survey.

In 2013, the song was sung at the enthronement of Justin Welby as Archbishop of Canterbury.

=== Cover versions ===
In 2010, Owl City's Adam Young recorded a version and offered it through his blog. About the song, he wrote: "I'm twenty-four years old, yet something about this song makes me bawl like a baby. The way the melodies and lyrics swirl together is so poignant and beautiful. If I were to count on one hand, the number of songs that have ever deeply moved me, this one would take the cake. Last night I probably spent more time actually crying at the piano than I did recording it. Such are the secret confessions of a shy boy from Minnesota".

In 2012, American singer Christina Grimmie uploaded a cover of "In Christ Alone" to her YouTube channel.

In 2013, the song was covered by American worship band Passion—with a new bridge section added—and led by Kristian Stanfill, and was included in their 2013 live album Passion: Let the Future Begin.

In 2015, a portion of the piano melody featured on American musician Julien Baker's album Sprained Ankle, at the end of one of its tracks "Go Home". Baker later remarked: "It holds a lot of memories for me—being young in church, and the lyrics hold a lot of meaning when you analyze them."

In 2023, the song was covered by American singer Natalie Grant on her 2023 album Seasons, and in 2024 it was featured on Michael W. Smith's EP Worthy Is the Lamb.

== Theological debate ==
The second verse of the hymn contains the line, "Till on that cross as Jesus died, the wrath of God was satisfied," which adheres to the satisfaction theory of atonement. This line has hence made the song a subject of criticism by opponents of satisfaction theory. In 2013, a 15-member committee of the Presbyterian Church (USA) voted to exclude the song from a new church hymnal after Townend and Getty refused permission to alter the controversial line to "the love of God was magnified." Members of the committee to compile the hymnal had discovered the alternate lyrics in a Baptist hymnal from 2010, causing them to assume that the change had been authorized by the copyright holders. Critics of the committee's decision pointed out that the hymnal included other hymns endorsing satisfaction theory and the substitutionary model of atonement, including "O Sacred Head Now Wounded." According to committee chair Mary Louise Bringle, the decision to exclude "In Christ Alone" centered not on the word "wrath" but rather on "satisfied."

The committee's decision to exclude the song triggered a larger debate across denominations and within the Presbyterian Church USA itself. PCUSA minister Chris Joiner of First said that while many in his congregation liked the hymn, he agreed with the decision because "that lyric comes close to saying that God killed Jesus. The cross is not an instrument of God's wrath." Timothy George, the dean of Beeson Divinity School, criticized the decision in an online column titled "No Squishy Love" and claimed that it "fits into a wider pattern of downplaying parts of Christian doctrine that are offensive." Boyce College professor Denny Burk took a view similar to George, stating that "When wrath goes, so does the central meaning of the atonement of God: penal substitution. At the end of the day, the cross itself is the stumbling block, and that is why the PCUSA cannot abide by this hymn." Meanwhile, Bob Terry of The Alabama Baptist wrote that he agreed with satisfaction theory, but "if the meaning of 'wrath' is that God is vindictive and took joy in punishing His Son then that is not how I find God described in the Bible. As I understand the Bible, it was because 'God so loved the world' that He was willing 'to crush Him and cause Him to suffer.'"
