= Along the Road =

Along the Road may refer to:

- Along the Road (album), by Susan Ashton, Margaret Becker, and Christine Denté, 1994
- "Along the Road" (song), by Karmin, 2015
