= Looking into Light =

Looking Into Light

Studio album by Joanne Hogg
- Released: 15 November 1999
- Recorded: early 1999
- Genre: Celtic rock, Folk rock, Christian rock
- Length: 60:01
- Label: Alliance
- Producer: Dave Bainbridge

Looking Into Light is an album by Joanne Hogg. It was released in 1999, and reissued in 2006 as Celtic Hymns.

The idea for Looking Into Light came from Hogg's father who was struck by the "When I Survey the Wondrous Cross" recording by Iona. He made the suggestion that Hogg should record a complete album of hymns. Until the sudden death of her mother in February 1997, the idea was given little thought. The choice of songs and hymns came from those familiar to the family, and the album was put together over the next year or so.

The recordings were engineered by Nigel Palmer at the following studios:

- The Snooker Room, Ireland
- Gemini Studios, Ipswich
- Visions Of Albion, Yorkshire
- Rod's Cellar, Yorkshire

== Personnel ==
=== Band ===
- Joanne Hogg – vocals, keyboard instruments
- Dave Bainbridge – keyboards, guitar, bouzouki
- Troy Donockley – Uilleann pipes, low whistles
- Phil Barker – bass guitar
- Tim Harries – fuzz bass
- Frank van Essen – drum kit, percussion instruments, violin
- Dave Fitzgerald – flute, tin whistle
- Chris Redgate – oboe
- The Emperor String Quartet – strings
  - Martin Burgess – 1st violin
  - Claire Hayes – 2nd violin
  - Fiona Bonds – viola
  - William Schofield – cello
- Backing vocals on "Brightest and Best" – Hogg's sisters Helen, Doreen and Muriel

== Track listing ==
1. "I Heard The Voice" – 3:59
2. "My Song Is Love Unknown" – 4:13
3. "How Sweet The Name" – 5:33
4. "Spacious Firmament" – 4:34
5. "Be Thou My Vision" – 6:20
6. "I Ask No Dream" – 5:23
7. "Oh The Deep, Deep Love" – 4:01
8. "Rock Of Ages" – 7:08
9. "Brightest And Best" – 3:54
10. "Almighty Father Who Dost Give" – 4:59
11. "When I Survey" – 6:30
12. "Be Still My Soul" – 3:27

== Release details ==
- 1999, UK, Alliance Records 1901182, Release date : 15 November 1999, CD
- 1999, USA, Forefront Records FFD-5229, Release date : 15 November 1999, CD
