= New Irish Hymns 2 =

New Irish Hymns 2: Father, Son, and Holy Spirit

Studio album by Margaret Becker, Joanne Hogg, Kristyn Lennox, Yellow Perch
- Released: 2003
- Genre: Celtic music, contemporary worship music
- Label: Kingsway
- Producer: Keith Getty

New Irish Hymns 2: Father, Son, and Holy Spirit is the second in a series of themed albums created and produced by Keith Getty. This album features vocalists Margaret Becker, Joanne Hogg, and Kristyn Lennox (Getty) performing songs by Keith Getty and others (as indicated below). Margaret Becker and Joanne Hogg performed on the previous album, New Irish Hymns; all three singers also performed on New Irish Hymns 3: Incarnation and New Irish Hymns 4: Hymns for the Life of the Church. New Irish Hymns 2: Father, Son, and Holy Spirit is a studio album produced by Keith Getty.

It features vocalists Margaret Becker, Joanne Hogg, and Kristyn Lennox.

Released in 2003 under Kingsway label.

== Track listing ==
1. "See, What a Morning (Resurrection Hymn)" (by Keith Getty and Stuart Townend)
2. "I Will Trust" (by Kristyn Lennox (Getty) and Keith Getty)
3. "God of Grace" (by Jonathan Rea and Keith Getty)
4. "Join All the Glorious Names" (by Kristyn Lennox (Getty) and Keith Getty)
5. "My Heart is Filled" (by Keith Getty and Stuart Townend)
6. "Cross of Jesus" (by Kristyn Lennox (Getty) and Keith Getty)
7. "Come, Let Us Sing" (by Kristyn Lennox (Getty) and Keith Getty)
8. "Jesus, Ever Abiding Friend" (by Keith Getty and Steve Siler)
9. "Jesus is Lord" (by Keith Getty and Stuart Townend)
10. "Repentance" (by Keith Getty and Stuart Townend)
11. "Oh My Soul" (by Keith Getty and Margaret Becker)
12. "The Risen Christ (Doxology)" (by Keith Getty and Phil Madeira)

== Credits ==
- Keith Getty – Composer, producer, orchestrator, piano
- Stephen Doherty – Executive producer
- Margaret Becker – Co-producer
- Tim Oliver – Keyboards, programming, prelude on “My Heart is Filled”
- Ken Lewis – Drums and percussion
- Stephen Leiweke – Guitars
- Peter Wilson – Background vocals
- Chris Donohue – Bass guitar, low whistles, accordion
- City of Prague Philharmonic Orchestra – Strings

== See also ==
- New Irish Hymns (series)
