= New Irish Hymns 3 =

New Irish Hymns 3: Incarnation

Studio album by Margaret Becker, Joanne Hogg, Kristyn Getty
- Released: 2004
- Genre: Celtic music, contemporary worship music
- Label: Kingsway
- Producer: Keith Getty

New Irish Hymns 3: Incarnation is the third in a series of themed albums created and produced by Keith Getty. This album features vocalists Margaret Becker, Joanne Hogg, and Kristyn Getty performing songs by Keith Getty and others (as indicated below). Margaret Becker and Joanne Hogg performed on the first New Irish Hymns album with Moya Brennan; all three singers on this CD also performed on New Irish Hymns 2: Father, Son, and Holy Spirit and New Irish Hymns 4: Hymns for the Life of the Church.

== Track listing ==
1. "Prologue"
  (by Keith Getty and Tom Howard)
2. "Glorious Light"
  (by Kristyn Getty, Keith Getty, and Ian Hannah)
3. "Joy Has Dawned Across the World"
  (by Stuart Townend and Keith Getty)
4. "Holy Child Who Chose the Hearts of Men"
  (by Kristyn Getty and Keith Getty)
5. "Imagine"
  (by Keith Getty and Kristyn Getty)
6. "Fullness of Grace"
  (by Kristyn Getty, Keith Getty, and Stuart Townend)
7. "When Love Came Down to Earth"
  (by Stuart Townend)
8. "Jesus, Your Name"
  (by Keith Getty, Kristyn Getty, and Ian Hannah)
9. "Born Where the Shadows Lie"
  (by Keith Getty and Kristyn Getty)
10. "Celtic Christmas Blessing"
  (by Keith Getty and Kristyn Getty)

== Credits ==
- Keith Getty – Composer, producer, orchestrator, piano
- Stephen Doherty – Executive producer
- Tom Howard – Keyboards, arranging, programming, and additional orchestrations
- Tim Oliver – Additional programming
- Ken Lewis – Drums and percussion
- Stephen Leiweke – Guitars, additional programming, vocal tuning
- Chris Donohue – Bass guitar, whistles
- Suzanne Bennett – Additional background vocals
- Phil Keaggy – Guitar solo on track 7
- City of Prague Philharmonic Orchestra – Strings

== See also ==
- New Irish Hymns (series)
