= Music of Xenosaga =

Music of the video game series Xenosaga

The Xenosaga (ゼノサーガ) series is a series of science fiction role-playing video games developed by Monolith Soft and published by Namco Bandai on the PlayStation 2. The series began with the 2002 release of Episode I: Der Wille zur Macht, which was followed in 2004 by Episode II: Jenseits von Gut und Böse and in 2006 by Episode III: Also sprach Zarathustra. The music of Xenosaga includes the soundtracks to all three chapters, as well as the music for its spin-off media. These include Xenosaga Freaks, a set of minigames set between the first two chapters, Xenosaga I & II, a Nintendo DS remake of the first two chapters, and Xenosaga: The Animation, an anime series covering the events of the first game. Episode I was composed by Yasunori Mitsuda, Episode II was split between Yuki Kajiura, Shinji Hosoe, and Ayako Saso, and Episode III was composed by Kajiura alone. Xenosaga Freaks reused some of the music of Episode I by Mitsuda while also including new work by Shinji Hosoe, Ayako Saso, Masashi Yano, Keiichi Okabe, Satoru Kōsaki, and Hiroshi Okubo, while Xenosaga I & II and Xenosaga: The Animation used new pieces composed by Kousuke Yamashita.

Episode I sparked the release of two versions of its soundtrack album as well as a single, Episode II received two soundtrack albums, and Episode III received one. Xenosaga Freaks and Xenosaga: The Animation each also sparked the release of a soundtrack album. In addition to the albums, Episode I saw the release of a book of orchestral sheet music as well as a book of piano sheet music; Episode II had only a book of piano sheet music. Music from the series has been played multiple times in concerts, especially that of the first two games.

== Main series ==
=== Episode I ===
Xenosaga Original Soundtrack

Soundtrack album by Yasunori Mitsuda
- Released: March 6, 2002
- Length: 55:08 (disc 1); 1:03:34 (disc 2)
- Label: DigiCube

Xenosaga Episode I

Soundtrack album by Yasunori Mitsuda
- Released: May 19, 2004
- Length: 1:02:09 (disc 1); 1:13:27 (disc 2)
- Label: Sleigh Bells

The first episode in the series was Xenosaga Episode I: Der Wille zur Macht, released in 2002. Designed as a spiritual successor to Xenogears, the game was worked on by much of the same staff, including the composer Yasunori Mitsuda. For the game, Mitsuda composed a score that is mostly orchestral in nature, using the London Philharmonic Orchestra conducted by Steven Lloyd-Gonzalez for several tracks. Other pieces include vocal tracks by the Metro Voices choir, also conducted by Lloyd-Gonzalez, piano solos by Yasuharu Nakanishi, and performances by the Gen Ittetsu Strings. The game's theme songs, "Pain" and "Kokoro", were sung by Celtic singer Joanne Hogg of the band Iona, with whom Mitsuda had previously worked for the soundtrack to Xenogears. The vocal songs throughout the soundtrack range from choral to opera to a capella, while the tone of the soundtrack overall has been described as being "serious, sometimes dark, heavy and even haunting at times". At one point in the development process, Mitsuda planned to use a separate person to orchestrate his compositions after an early piece proved unworkable and had to be scrapped, causing him to lose confidence in his own ability. After working for several months, however, he regained his confidence and decided to work as his own orchestrator, a decision which he feels improved him as a composer.

The first release of the soundtrack as an album was the Xenosaga Original Soundtrack, released by DigiCube on March 6, 2002. The two-disc album includes every piece from the game's soundtrack, with a total length of 1:58:42 across its 45 tracks. Two years later, on May 19, 2004, Mitsuda released another version of the soundtrack through his Sleigh Bells label titled Xenosaga Episode I. This version features two new tracks—"World to be Born" and "Pain ~piano version~"—as well as re-recordings of some of the tracks. The playlist order was also changed between the two versions, with Episode I grouping the tracks by style, rather than in rough chronological order within the game like the original album. Mitsuda explained in the liner notes for the album that he felt that separating the two styles presented a different impression of the music that allowed the listener to greater appreciate the atmosphere of the pieces. In addition to the two albums, a single, "Kokoro", was released for the game's theme songs. Published by DigiCube, the disc includes "Pain" and "Kokoro" from the original soundtrack as well as a piano rendition of Kokoro and instrumental versions of both songs. The album has a total length of 23:55, and was released on February 6, 2002.

The Original Soundtrack album reached #38 on the Japan Oricon charts and was well received by reviewers. IGN termed it one of Mitsuda's best soundtracks to date, calling it "near genius with nearly every passing track". They especially praised the wide range of emotions present in the soundtrack. GameSpy agreed in their review of the game, saying that "the music is rich, full, varied, and underscores the cinemas and battle sequences excellently". RPGFan, in their review of the Xenosaga Original Soundtrack album, said that the album works well as a stand-alone album apart from the game, and that it has few, if any, bland or mediocre tracks. They repeated their praise for the soundtrack in their review of Xenosaga Episode I, though they felt that the two new tracks were not very impressive additions. "Kokoro" reached #61 and received praise as well, for its emotional intensity and lyrics.

Original soundtrack track list

Disc 1
No.	Title	Japanese title	Length
1.	"Prologue"	Prologue	4:32
2.	"Opening"	Opening	4:02
3.	"Battle"	Battle	2:59
4.	"Battle's End"	戦闘終了	0:42
5.	"Starting Test"	起動試験	2:19
6.	"Rising Emotions"	想いで	3:14
7.	"Gnosis"	Gnosis	4:22
8.	"Awakening"	覚醒	2:23
9.	"Shion's Crisis"	シオンの危機	1:54
10.	"Battling KOS-MOS"	戦闘するKOS-MOS	3:15
11.	"Sorrow"	哀しみ	3:43
12.	"Life or Death"	Life or Death	3:15
13.	"Game Over"	Game Over	0:42
14.	"Margulis"	Margulis	4:24
15.	"Breaking Space Ship Pursuit"	追われる宇宙艇	3:33
16.	"Relief"	Relief	2:43
17.	"Daily"	日常	1:55
18.	"U.M.N.MODE"	U.M.N. MODE	2:39
19.	"Durandal"	Durandal	2:32
20.	"Invasion Inside an Enemy Ship"	敵艇内への侵攻	0:39
21.	"U-TIC System"	U-TIC機関	2:45
22.	"Closed Minded Girl"	心を閉ざした少女	2:13
23.	"Kookai Foundation"	Kookai Foundation	1:55
24.	"Shion ~Past Memory~"	Shion 〜過去の記憶〜	1:11

Disc 2
No.	Title	Japanese title	Length
1.	"Ormus"	Ormus	2:27
2.	"Nephilim"	Nephilim	2:31
3.	"Warmth"	温もり	1:42
4.	"Insecurity"	不安	4:08
5.	"The Resurrection"	The Resurrection	1:54
6.	"Beach of Nothingness"	虚無の浜辺	2:28
7.	"Green Sleeves"	Green Sleeves	2:25
8.	"Zarathustra"	Zarathustra	3:06
9.	"KOS-MOS"	KOS-MOS	2:27
10.	"Panic"	Panic	2:21
11.	"Song of Nephilim"	Song of Nephilim	1:04
12.	"The Miracle"	The Miracle	1:52
13.	"Inner Space"	Inner Space	1:47
14.	"Albedo"	Albedo	3:45
15.	"Omega"	Ω	4:07
16.	"Proto Merkabah"	Proto Merkabah	5:25
17.	"Last Battle"	Last Battle	5:05
18.	"Pain"	Pain	5:36
19.	"Escape"	Escape	2:30
20.	"Kokoro (Heart)"	Kokoro	5:35
21.	"Shion ~Emotion~"	Shion 〜想い〜	1:19

Episode I track list

Disc 1
No.	Title	Japanese title	Length
1.	"Shion ~Memories of the Past~"	Shion ～過去の記憶～	1:15
2.	"Prologue"	Prologue	4:35
3.	"Gnosis"	Gnosis	4:25
4.	"U-TIC Facility"	U-TIC機関	2:49
5.	"The Girl Who Closed Her Heart"	心を閉ざした少女	2:15
6.	"Ormus"	Ormus	2:29
7.	"Nephilim"	Nephilim	2:33
8.	"Warmth <New Recording>"	温もり (new recording)	2:01
9.	"The Resurrection"	The Resurrection	1:53
10.	"Beach of the Void <New Recording>"	虚無の浜辺 (new recording)	2:35
11.	"Green Sleeves <New Recording>"	Green Sleeves (new recording)	2:27
12.	"KOS-MOS"	KOS-MOS	2:28
13.	"The Miracle"	The Miracle	1:53
14.	"Zarathustra"	Zarathustra	3:05
15.	"Ω"	Ω	4:08
16.	"Escape"	Escape	2:33
17.	"Pain"	Pain	5:39
18.	"Kokoro"	Kokoro	5:37
19.	"Shion ~Emotion~"	Shion ～想い～	1:24
20.	"World to be Born"	World to be Born	3:19
21.	"Pain -piano version- <New Recording>"	Pain -Piano Version- (new recording)	2:46

Disc 2
No.	Title	Japanese title	Length
1.	"Opening"	Opening	4:02
2.	"Battle"	Battle	2:59
3.	"Battle's End"	戦闘終了	0:42
4.	"Starting Examination"	起動試験	2:22
5.	"Thoughts"	想いで	3:19
6.	"Awakening"	覚醒	2:21
7.	"Shion's Crisis"	シオンの危機	1:54
8.	"Fighting KOS-MOS"	戦闘するKOS-MOS	3:19
9.	"Sadness"	哀しみ	3:54
10.	"Life or Death"	Life or Death	3:16
11.	"Game Over"	Game Over	0:42
12.	"Margulis"	Margulis	4:29
13.	"Followed Space Shuttle"	追われる宇宙艇	3:43
14.	"Relief"	Relief	2:47
15.	"Everyday"	日常	1:54
16.	"U.M.N. MODE"	U.M.N.Mode	2:39
17.	"Durandal"	Durandal	2:33
18.	"Invasion Inside an Enemy Ship"	敵艦内への侵攻	0:41
19.	"Kookai Foundation"	Kookai Foundation	1:58
20.	"Anxiety"	不安	4:08
21.	"Panic"	Panic	2:27
22.	"Song of Nephilim"	Song of Nephilim	1:06
23.	"Inner Space"	Inner Space	1:47
24.	"Albedo"	Albedo	3:50
25.	"Proto Merkabah"	Proto Merkabah	5:30
26.	"Last Battle"	Last Battle	5:04

=== Episode II ===
Xenosaga II: Jenseits Von Gut und Böse Movie Scene Soundtrack

Soundtrack album by Yuki Kajiura
- Released: July 7, 2004
- Length: 1:04:29 (disc 1); 47:57 (disc 2)
- Label: Victor Entertainment

Xenosaga Episode II: Jenseits von Gut und Böse Soundtrack

Soundtrack album by Yuki Kajiura
- Released: February 17, 2005
- Length: 30:25
- Label: Namco/Brady Games

The second episode of the series, Xenosaga Episode II: Jenseits von Gut und Böse, was released in 2004. Mitsuda did not return to compose the soundtrack; instead, Yuki Kajiura, Shinji Hosoe, and Ayako Saso were brought into the project. Kajiura had previously composed for a few video games as well as numerous anime soundtracks. Her style for the game's soundtrack, for which she composed only the numerous cinematic scenes, has been described as "a fusion of electronica and techno with either an orchestra or ethnic instruments," as well as including vocals in places where many composers would have left an instrumental section. Saso composed a portion of the music used in cutscenes, as well as sound effects and tracks used in battle sections of gameplay. Hosoe composed the music for the other playable portions of the game, and feels that the sound quality and balance of the soundtrack is poor. This feeling is based primarily on the fact that he "slashed the orchestral sound while creating the music" so that the music played using the PlayStation 2's sound chip would match the music played off of the CD. He had predicted that there would be a fan outcry against "changing composers on a series like Xenosaga", and suspects that his music from the game will never be released on an album; to date the released albums for the game include only Kajiura's work. Kajiura and Hosoe did not collaborate on any of the tracks in Episode II; according to Kajiura they never even met during the production.

Episode II's soundtrack was first released as an album on July 7, 2004, as Xenosaga II: Jenseits Von Gut und Böse Movie Scene Soundtrack by Victor Entertainment. Including only Kajiura's work, the album spans two discs and 40 tracks and has a duration of 1:52:26. Another soundtrack album for the game, Xenosaga Episode II: Jenseits von Gut und Böse Soundtrack, was released by Namco and Brady Games as a promotional extra for the Brady Games strategy guide for the game. The 11-track CD again excluded the work of Hosoe, instead sampling Kajiura's pieces. Released on February 17, 2005, the album has a duration of 30:25. The Movie Scene album reached position #46 on the Japanese Oricon charts. In the liner notes for Movie Scene Soundtrack, Kajiura claims that she felt that her work for the game was different from her previous pieces, as it was more of a soundtrack, with the individual tunes fitting more closely together. She also said that she found it easier to compose tracks that fit with the worldview that Mitsuda had created for the first game, rather than invent her own. She also notes that she intended tracks 1–4 to be a single, continuous piece, although they were broken up in the game; she intended tracks 20 and 21 the same way.

IGN, in their review of the game, said that the soundtrack for Episode II was not up to par with that of Episode I. They felt that Hosoe's tracks were in general too "upbeat and poppy" for the game's premise, and that while Kaijura's works were better, they were still weaker than Mitsuda's. One review from RPGamer agreed with this sentiment, calling the music on the whole "pretty dull and unmemorable", though another RPGamer review praised the increase in the number of tracks present in the game, giving the listener greater variety. An RPGFan review of the Movie Scene album termed it a "fantastic album", though one with several weak tracks and an aesthetic that would not appeal to many listeners, especially those who disliked vocal tracks. Their review of the promotional album gave that album high marks as well, saying that it was an excellent sampler album and, at the time, easy to find due to its inclusion in the game's strategy guide.

Episode II track list
No.	Title	Length
1.	"In the Beginning, There Was..."	2:01
2.	"Xenosaga II Opening Theme"	2:34
3.	"Fatal Fight (Jin & Margulis)"	4:12
4.	"Albedo"	1:58
5.	"Sakura (Theme-Piano Ver.)"	1:38
6.	"Here She Comes (KOS-MOS)"	2:38
7.	"I Am Free"	1:39
8.	"Sweet Song (Xenosaga II Ending Theme)"	5:30
9.	"Jr."	3:25
10.	"Nephilim"	1:27
11.	"The Image Theme of Xenosaga II"	3:23

Movie Scene soundtrack track list

Disc 1
No.	Title	Length
1.	"in the beginning, there was..."	2:01
2.	"first meeting"	2:48
3.	"Xenosaga II opening theme"	2:33
4.	"assault"	3:41
5.	"strain~Jin"	3:55
6.	"here he comes"	1:58
7.	"fatal fight (Jin & Margulis)"	4:14
8.	"R&D report"	1:51
9.	"chase"	2:39
10.	"surrounded"	2:56
11.	"lamentation"	5:24
12.	"Albedo"	1:59
13.	"communication breakdown"	4:14
14.	"Sakura (theme-piano ver.)"	1:38
15.	"Sakura #2 (theme-simple voc.ver.)"	2:32
16.	"strained"	1:09
17.	"Jr. #2"	1:42
18.	"strained #2~Albedo #2"	3:55
19.	"in the beginning, there was... #2"	2:00
20.	"battle of Elsa"	3:03
21.	"here she comes (KOS-MOS)"	2:38
22.	"battle of Elsa #2"	2:10
23.	"gate out"	3:30

Disc 2
No.	Title	Length
1.	"here he comes #2"	3:31
2.	"creeping fear"	2:06
3.	"U-DO~Febronia"	3:48
4.	"final crisis"	2:15
5.	"presentiment~Jr. #3"	3:16
6.	"a field of battle~bitter #2"	2:57
7.	"inside~Sakura #3"	1:25
8.	"I am free"	1:40
9.	"Sakura #4 (theme-gentle strings ver.)"	2:06
10.	"Sweet Song (Xenosaga II ending theme)"	5:33
11.	"Jr."	3:27
12.	"Jr. #4"	2:37
13.	"fatal fight #2"	2:21
14.	"bitter"	2:53
15.	"Nephilim"	1:29
16.	"the image theme of Xenosaga II #piano ver."	3:11
17.	"the image theme of Xenosaga II"	3:24

=== Episode III ===
Xenosaga III: Also Sprach Zarathustra Original Sound Best Tracks

Soundtrack album by Yuki Kajiura
- Released: July 12, 2006
- Genre: Video game soundtrack
- Length: 53:03 (disc 1); 58:43 (disc 2)
- Label: Victor Entertainment

The third and final episode in the series, Xenosaga Episode III: Also sprach Zarathustra, was released in 2006. Composed entirely by Kajiura, her style shifted from that of Episode II to be darker, with a larger focus on rhythm and less use of background vocals. The soundtrack has been described as "melancholy" and "piano-driven". Despite moving from composing only the cinematic tracks in Episode II to composing the whole score for Episode III, Kajiura says that the difficulty of each game's score was about the same. She primarily drew her inspiration for the music from the game's artwork and her conception of the world the game was set in.

The only soundtrack album released for the game was Xenosaga III: Also Sprach Zarathustra Original Sound Best Tracks, an album of selections from the soundtrack rather than all of the tracks. The two-disc album has 40 tracks, and a total length of 1:51:46. It was published by Victor Entertainment on July 12, 2006. The album reached position #50 on the Japanese Oricon charts, and stayed on the charts for four weeks. In the liner notes for the album, sound producer Keiichi Nozaki explains that the album would have needed to be six discs long to hold all of the music from the game, so he asked Kajiura to select a sample that would only fill two discs.

In RPGamer's review of the game, they termed the soundtrack a "stunning success", saying that Kajiura provided an "emotionally charged soundtrack" that fit the tone of each section of the game and was superior to the soundtrack of Episode II. G4TV called the soundtrack "a respectable contender" and better than Episode II's soundtrack as well, praising the music's restraint and usage in accenting the game rather than overpowering it. IGN called it "pretty darned good", though noted that it was not as good as the score to the first game. RPGFan, in their review of the album, said that while the quality of the overall work was better than that of Episode II's Movie Scene soundtrack album, the album was very inconsistent between great and poor tracks. They concluded that Kajiura had ultimately not succeeded in being Mitsuda's successor for the series.

Best Tracks track list

Disc 1
No.	Title	Length
1.	"a prelude to the tragedy"	2:00
2.	"fallout"	2:03
3.	"we've got to believe in something"	3:06
4.	"a dark omen"	2:27
5.	"forgotten sanctuary"	2:26
6.	"creeping into"	2:15
7.	"the battle of your soul"	3:07
8.	"rolling down the U.M.N."	2:07
9.	"in a limestone cave"	2:17
10.	"inferno"	1:54
11.	"on our ways"	2:36
12.	"a new world"	2:11
13.	"T-elos"	2:22
14.	"the Miltia incidents"	3:05
15.	"Febronia"	2:51
16.	"promised pain"	3:07
17.	"mother, I miss you"	2:21
18.	"fate"	2:11
19.	"Zarathustra dangeon"	2:17
20.	"shifting territories"	3:21
21.	"hepatica#2"	1:42
22.	"the harsh truth"	2:08
23.	"to the last place"	1:53

Disc 2
No.	Title	Length
1.	"hepatica (KOS-MOS)"	5:14
2.	"battleland"	3:34
3.	"a memory of a tragedy"	1:40
4.	"testament"	3:44
5.	"survive"	3:08
6.	"T-elos#2"	2:12
7.	"she's coming back"	1:57
8.	"when the grief lets you go"	2:33
9.	"godsibb"	3:23
10.	"Febronia#2"	2:13
11.	"crisis coming"	2:50
12.	"a new world#2"	1:55
13.	"outrageous"	2:41
14.	"when the grief lets you go #2"	3:22
15.	"I love you, sincerely"	3:32
16.	"hepatica#3~I believe in you"	7:52
17.	"maybe tomorrow~ending medley"	7:43

== Spin-off media ==
The spin-off media of the Xenosaga series to include music are a collection of minigames titled Xenosaga Freaks that explores the backstory of Episode I, a remake of the first two episodes for the Nintendo DS titled Xenosaga I & II, and an anime series titled Xenosaga: The Animation. There are also other media adaptions without music, such as a manga series. Xenosaga Freaks included new work by Shinji Hosoe, Ayako Saso, Masashi Yano, Keiichi Okabe, Satoru Kōsaki, and Hiroshi Okubo while Xenosaga I & II and Xenosaga: The Animation used new pieces composed by Kousuke Yamashita.

Freaks sparked the release of an album, Xenosaga Freaks Reservation Privilege CD, which includes three vocal tracks sung by the voice actresses for the characters Shion, KOS-MOS, and M.O.M.O. from the game, a fourth vocal track featuring all three of the singers, and a radio-style interview with them. The 31:08 long album was released on April 28, 2004. The songs, composed by Namco composers Satoru Kōsaki and Hiroshi Okubo, is described as "silly lighthearted techno-pop", and very different from the music in the main games of the series. The album, however, does not include the instrumental tracks composed by Shinji Hosoe, Ayako Saso, Masashi Yano, and Keiichi Okabe. Xenosaga: The Animation also received an album release, titled Xenosaga: The Animation Original Soundtrack; the 35-track album was released by Columbia Records on March 23, 2005.

== Legacy ==
Music from the series was performed at the three-show "Passion" concert series held in December 2006 by the Eminence Symphony Orchestra. The concerts included "Pain" from Episode I and "Sakura" from Episode II. Several tracks from Mitsuda and Kajiura's other works were also performed. An album, Passion, was produced by the orchestra for the concert, and included both of the Xenosaga songs. In the Eminence April 21, 2007 "A Night in Fantasia 2007" concert, "Gnosis", "Zarathustra", and "World to be Born" from Episode I were played. "Pain" was again performed by a piano quintet from the Eminence Orchestra in their four-show "Destiny - Reunion" concert series in July 2007. Several other non-Xenosaga pieces by Mitsuda and Kajiura were again also performed. In the Destiny: Dreamer's Alliance album released for that concert series and others by the same quintet, "Nephilim" from Episode I, rather than "Pain", was included.

In addition to concerts, music from the series has been released as sheet music. On January 20, 2004, Mitsuda released Partitura Originale Di Xenosaga Episodio Uno Sheet Music, a book of orchestral sheet music for tracks from Episode I, through his record label Procyon Studio. The book contains 22 songs, composed and arranged by Mitsuda. In addition to that book, DOREMI Music Publishing published a book of piano sheet music, Xenosaga Episode I Der Wille zur Macht Piano Solo Sheet Music. The book contains 21 songs, arranged by Asako Niwa as beginning to intermediate-level piano solos. DOREMI Music Publishing also published a book of piano sheet music for Episode II, Xenosaga Episode II Jenseits von Gut und Böse Piano Solo Sheet Music. The book contains 23 tracks, arranged by Asako Niwa as beginning to intermediate-level piano solos. Selections of remixes of music from the series appear on Japanese remix albums, called dōjin, and on English remixing websites such as OverClocked ReMix.
