= Along the Road (album) =

Studio album by Susan Ashton, Margaret Becker, Christine Denté
- Released: 1994
- Genre: CCM, folk
- Length: 51:11
- Label: Sparrow
- Producer: Wayne Kirkpatrick

Along the Road is an album by Susan Ashton, Margaret Becker, and Out of the Grey's Christine Denté, released in 1994.

== Reception ==
Professional ratings
Review scores
Source	Rating
AllMusic	3/5 stars
Cross Rhythms	9/10 stars
Hallels	(positive)

Cashbox's Gary Keplinger said that on the album, the "distinct styles" of the trio were "perfectly blended to give us a sound that can be described best as heavenly.'" The album topped CCM Magazine's readers poll for favorite inspirational album of the year in 1995, and the trio were nominated for the GMA Dove Award for Group of the Year.

== Track listing ==
1. "Angels" – 5:37 (Jennifer Kimball, Tom Kimmel)
2. "Song of Reconciliation" – 4:27 (Wayne Kirkpatrick)
3. "No Other" – 4:28 (Becker, Donna Douglas)
4. "Walk On" – 4:00 (Gayla and Jeff Borders)
5. "Breathe on Me" – 4:50 (Lowell Alexander, Billy Simon)
6. "Blessing in Disguise" – 3:21 (Kirkpatrick, Gordon Kennedy, Billy Sprague)
7. "Taking My Time" – 3:41 (Christine Denté, Charlie Peacock)
8. "Near to You" – 4:37 (Susan Ashton, Gary Chapman)
9. "Oh Me of Little Faith" – 3:56 (Kim Patton, Michael Puryear)
10. "What Am I" – 3:16 (Kirkpatrick, Sprague)
11. "Waiting to Be Found" – 4:17 (Kirkpatrick, Sprague)
12. "Along the Road" – 4:41 (Dan Fogelberg)

== Personnel ==
Main performers

- Susan Ashton – lead vocal ("Song of Reconciliation", "Walk On", "Near to You", "Waiting to Be Found"), backing vocals
- Margaret Becker – lead vocal ("No Other", "Blessing in Disguise", "Oh Me of Little Faith", "Along the Road"), backing vocals
- Christine Denté – lead vocal ("Angels", "Breathe on Me", "Taking My Time", "What Am I"), backing vocals

Musicians

- Carl Marsh – Fairlight strings (1, 4), keyboards (5, 7), Hammond B3 organ (8, 11)
- John Mark Painter – accordion (3), string quartet arrangements (12)
- Shane Keister – keyboards (5), Wurlitzer electric piano (7)
- Wayne Kirkpatrick – acoustic guitar (1–5, 8, 10, 11, 12), acoustic piano (2), hi-string guitar (10), electric guitar (11)
- Gordon Kennedy – acoustic guitar solo (1), electric guitar (2, 3, 4, 6–10), 12-string electric guitar (2), dobro (4), hi-string guitar (8, 10), talk box (9), finger snaps (9), floor stomps (9), acoustic guitar (11)
- John D. Wills – mandolin (1), "cowboy" guitar (6), guitar bells (10)
- Jerry McPherson – electric guitar (3–9, 11), finger snaps (9), floor stomps (9)
- Jerry Douglas – Weissenborn guitar (5), lap steel guitar (9), finger snaps (9), floor stomps (9)
- Jerry Kennedy – electric guitar (6)
- Scott Denté – acoustic guitar (7)
- Jimmie Lee Sloas – bass (1, 2, 9, 11), finger snaps (9), floor stomps (9)
- Tommy Sims – bass (3–8, 10)
- Steve Brewster – drums (1–4, 6, 9, 11), percussion (1, 10), tambourine (9), snare drum (9), finger snaps (9), floor stomps (9)
- John Hammond – drums (5, 7, 8)
- John Catchings – cello (12)
- Kristin Wilkinson – viola (12)
- David Davidson – violin (12)
- Pamela Sixfin – violin (12)

Production

- Wayne Kirkpatrick – producer
- Peter York – executive producer
- D'Ann McAlister – production assistant
- JB – recording engineer, mixing
- Shawn McLean – assistant tracking engineer
- Todd Robbins – mix assistant
- Wayne Mehl – technical assistant
- The Bennett House, Franklin, Tennessee – track recording location
- The Beanstalk, Brentwood, Tennessee – overdubs recording location
- Mole End, Franklin, Tennessee – mix studio
- Hank Williams – mastering at MasterMix, Nashville, Tennessee
- Karen Philpott – art direction
- Margo Chase – landscape photography
- Mark Tucker – portrait photography
- Johnny Villanueva – hair and makeup
