= Tammy Trent =

American singer

Tammy Buffum, known professionally as Tammy Trent, is an American Christian singer.

Buffum first gained recognition as a state finalist in the Assemblies of God "Teen Talent Competition" in 1985.

On September 11, 2001, Buffum's husband died while on a missions trip, which led to a temporary halt in her music career. In 2002, she began speaking at the Extraordinary Women's conference and the Women Of Faith conference.

== Discography ==
- Tammy Trent, R.E.X. Records 1995 - includes the song "Your Love Is 4 Always"
- You Have My Heart
- Set You Free, Sparrow Records 2000
- Sunny Days
