= Falling Forward (Margaret Becker album) =

Studio album by Margaret Becker
- Released: 1998
- Studio: October Studios, Nashville, Tennessee; The White House, Nashville, Tennessee; Antenna Studios, Franklin, Tennessee
- Genre: Christian rock
- Label: Sparrow
- Producer: Tedd T, Robbie Nevil, Monroe Jones

Margaret Becker chronology
Grace (1995)	Falling Forward (1998)	What Kind of Love (1999)

Falling Forward is an album by Christian rock musician Margaret Becker, released in 1998 by Sparrow Records.

== Release and reception ==
Falling Forward is the eighth release by Sparrow Records for Margaret Becker. The collection of 11 songs was released in April 1998. It marked a significant change from synth-driven pop to a more acoustic, soulful approach. Allmusic.com Reviewer Melinda Hill states,

"Falling Forward is catchy and hypnotic. Becker leaves pure pop behind, bringing in electric guitars and a more alternative sensibility. The songs have taken on a new depth, unafraid to hit on the difficult things, ... Falling Forward ranks among the best that CCM has to offer, and is a wonderful new beginning for Becker"

CCM Magazine in its review of the album, writes, "Falling Forward paints a picture of life with all of its colors: some happy, some sad, some gut-wrenchingly painful, some tears-inducingly joyful."

== Track listing ==
1. "I Don't Know How" (Margaret Becker, Robbie Nevil) - 5:20
2. "Cave It In" (Becker, Byron Hagan, Michael Scott Quinlan) - 4:20
3. "Clay and Water" (Becker, Tanya Leah Roman) - 5:03
4. "Horses" (Becker, David Lichens, Brent Milligan, Tedd T) - 4:05
5. "Deliver Me" (Becker, Nevil) - 5:09
6. "Any Kind of Light" (Becker, Nevil) - 4:24
7. "Irish Sea" (Becker, Tedd T) - 4:08
8. "Coins and Promises" (Becker, Charles Garrett, Quinlan) - 5:11
9. "Crawl" (Becker, Tedd T) - 3:05
10. "Take Me In" (Becker) - 4:05
11. "I Testify" (Becker, Nevil) - 3:40

== Personnel ==
- Margaret Becker – lead vocals, backing vocals (1, 2, 3, 5–11), electric guitar (2, 6–11), acoustic guitar (3, 5, 7, 8, 9), 12-string acoustic guitar (4), guitar solo (9)
- Byron Hagan – keyboards (1, 8), acoustic piano (2), string arrangements (8)
- Giles Reaves – keyboards (1)
- Robbie Nevil – programming (1), acoustic guitar (1), backing vocals (1)
- Tedd T – programming (1, 3, 4, 7, 8, 9)
- Michael Scott Quinlan – programming (2, 3, 8), backing vocals (2, 7, 9), electric guitar (8)
- Monroe Jones – keyboards (3, 5)
- Jeff Roach – acoustic piano (3), keyboards (5, 6, 10, 11)
- Jay Joyce – electric guitar (1)
- Lynn Nichols – electric guitar (1, 2, 7), classical guitar (2, 6)
- Dave Perkins – electric guitar (2), "ambiance" guitar (9)
- Gary Burnette – electric guitar (3, 5)
- George Cocchini – electric guitar (3, 5, 6, 8, 10, 11)
- David Lichens – electric guitar (4)
- Wade Jaynes – baritone guitar (4), electric guitar (8), bass (8)
- Charles Garrett – electric guitar (7, 8)
- Michael Hodge – acoustic guitar (8)
- Chris Feinstein – bass (1)
- Brent Milligan – bass (2, 7, 9), electric guitar (4)
- Mark Hill – bass (3, 5, 6, 10, 11)
- Craig Young – bass (4)
- Jeff Quimby – drums (1, 4)
- Dan Needham – drums (2, 3, 5, 6, 8, 11), percussion (3, 6, 11), programming (3), djembe (10)
- Derek Wyatt – drums (7, 9)
- Shane Holloman – percussion (2)
- John Catchings – cello (1)
- Carl Marsh – string arrangements (1)
- Chris Rodriguez – backing vocals (11)

Production

- Lynn Nichols – executive producer
- Robbie Nevil – producer (1), recording (1)
- Tedd T – producer (1, 2, 4, 7, 8, 9)
- Monroe Jones – producer (3, 5, 6, 8, 10, 11), additional recording (3, 5, 6, 10, 11)
- Julian Kindred – recording (1, 2, 4, 7, 8, 9), additional recording (3, 5, 6, 10, 11), mixing at Antenna Studios
- Rick Will – recording (1)
- Marcelo Pennell – recording (2, 4, 7, 9)
- Jim Dineen – recording (3, 5, 6, 10, 11)
- Michael Scott Quinlan – additional recording (3, 5, 6, 10, 11), recording assistant (3, 5, 6, 10, 11)
- Chris Granger – recording assistant (3, 5, 6, 10, 11)
- October Studios, Nashville, Tennessee – recording studio
- The White House, Nashville, Tennessee – recording studio
- Antenna Studios, Franklin, Tennessee – recording studio
- Angie Cooley – mix assistant
- Terry Watson – mix assistant
- Hank Williams – mastering at MasterMix, Nashville, Tennessee
- Christiév Carothers – creative direction
- Jan Cook – art direction
- Gina Binkley – design
- Matthew Barnes – photography
- Mary Beth Felts – grooming
- Jamie Kearney – stylist
