= New Irish Hymns 4 =

New Irish Hymns 4: Hymns for the Life of the Church

Studio album by Margaret Becker, Joanne Hogg, Kristyn Getty
- Released: 2005
- Genre: Celtic music, contemporary worship music
- Label: Kingsway
- Producer: Keith Getty

New Irish Hymns 4: Hymns for the Life of the Church is the fourth and final album in a series of themed albums created and produced by Keith Getty. This album features vocalists Margaret Becker, Joanne Hogg, and Kristyn Getty performing songs by Keith Getty and others (as indicated below). Margaret Becker and Joanne Hogg performed on all four albums in the series. Kristyn Getty performed on nos. 2-4; printings before her marriage to Keith Getty used her maiden name, Kristyn Lennox.

== Track listing ==
1. The Power of the Cross (Hymn for Communion)
  (by Keith Getty and Stuart Townend)
2. Across the Lands (Hymn for World Missions)
  (by Keith Getty and Stuart Townend)
3. Your Glory Be Ever Known (Hymn for Opening a Service)
  (by Keith Getty and Margaret Becker)
4. Beneath the Cross (Hymn for the Cross and Community)
  (by Keith Getty and Kristyn Getty)
5. When Trials Come (Hymn on Suffering)
  (by Keith Getty and Kristyn Getty)
6. Speak, O Lord (Hymn for the Preaching of the Word)
  (by Keith Getty and Stuart Townend)
7. How Good, How Pleasing (Hymn for Unity)
  (by Keith Getty and Margaret Becker)
8. Light of God (Hymn for the World)
  Dedicated to C.S. Lewis
  (by Keith Getty and Kristyn Getty)
9. Every Promise (Hymn of Response to the Word)
  (by Keith Getty and Stuart Townend)
10. O For a Heart (Hymn of Dedication)"
  (by Keith Getty and Margaret Becker)
11. May the Peace of God (Hymn for Benediction)
  (by Keith Getty and Stuart Townend)
12. The Wonder of Grace (Orchestral Hymn Meditation)
  (arranged by Keith Getty using parts of his songs "Repentance" and "Fullness of Grace")

== Credits ==
- Keith Getty – Composer, producer, orchestrator, piano
- Joni McCabe – Co-producer
- Stephen Doherty – Executive producer
- Tim Oliver – Keyboards, programming, and arranging
- Scott Williamson – Drums and percussion
- Paul Brannon – Guitars
- Joey Canaday – Bass guitar
- City of Prague Philharmonic Orchestra – Strings
- (c) 2005 Kingsway Music

== See also ==
- New Irish Hymns (series)
