= Keith Getty =

Northern Irish Christian singer and songwriter (born 1974)

Keith Getty OBE
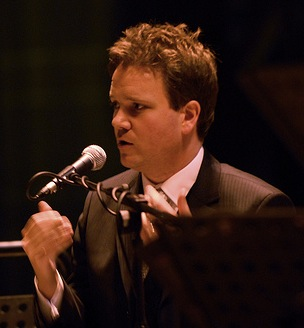
- Getty in 2008
- Born: Julian Keith Getty; 16 December 1974 (age 51); Lisburn, Northern Ireland
- Education: St Chad's College, Durham (BA)
- Occupations: Businessman; Singer; songwriter; record producer
- Years active: 1995–present
- Spouse: Kristyn Lennox (m. 2004)
- Musical career
- Genres: hymns; Celtic; classical; film; Christmas; gospel; contemporary Christian
- Instruments: vocals; piano; flute; guitar
- Labels: Getty Music; Thankyou Music
- Website: gettymusic.com

Julian Keith Getty OBE (born 16 December 1974) is a Northern Irish businessman, Christian singer and songwriter, best known for writing the song "In Christ Alone" in 2001 with Stuart Townend. Getty and his wife, Kristyn, also release music as the musical duo Keith & Kristyn Getty.

== Overview ==
Getty is a composer of Christian hymns. His song "In Christ Alone" is sung by an estimated 100 million people worldwide each year and was voted the third most popular hymn of all time in Britain on BBC's Songs of Praise. He has since written or published 38 of the top 500 songs sung in churches in the USA and UK as measured by CCLI.

As a recording artist, Getty's album Confessio: Irish American Roots was nominated for a Grammy Award for Best Gospel Roots Album and he has received two GMA Dove Awards. Often considered an ambassador for hymns, he has performed at venues including Carnegie Hall, Kennedy Center for the Performing Arts, Royal Albert Hall, and Sydney Opera House.

In 2017 Christianity Today described Getty and his wife Kristyn as "preeminent" hymn writers whose songs have "changed the way evangelicals worship." In 2018 Getty was named Officer of the Order of the British Empire by Elizabeth II for contributions to "Music and Modern Hymn Writing," making him the first contemporary church musician to receive this award.

Getty and his wife also own and operate their own record label, touring and song publishing company known as Getty Music. The organization hosts an annual church music conference called Sing! in Nashville, TN, attended by over 7,000 people. The couple also co-founded a charitable non-profit, the Getty Music Foundation, to implement global educational initiatives.

== Early life ==
Getty was born in Lisburn, Northern Ireland, to Helen Getty (née Irwin) and John Getty. He is the eldest of four children.

Getty began making music at age 11, learning to play the classical guitar; at 12 years old he began playing the flute. During school, Getty was influenced by classical music, Irish music, and church music of all kinds. As a young adult, he studied music at St Chad's College, Durham University, graduating with his Bachelor of Arts in 1995. As a student, Getty completed special conducting opportunities at the Canford Summer School of Music and the Tanglewood Music Center in Massachusetts. Getty participated in a summer master class under Irish flautist Sir James Galway.

== Personal life ==
Kristyn met Keith Getty in 2002 after being introduced by Kristyn's uncle, John Lennox. Kristyn was attending a nearby university and asked Getty for some musical advice. After dating for two years, the couple married on 16 June 2004 and have four daughters. Getty and his wife live between Portstewart, Northern Ireland and Nashville, Tennessee with their children.

== Career ==
=== Keith and Kristyn Getty ===
Keith and his wife Kristyn write and release hymns together, in addition to performing around the world. They have also co-authored a book on congregational worship called Sing!

=== Children's albums ===
Keith and Kristyn together have written and produced a number of children's worship albums.

- 2005: Songs That Jesus Said, a collection of songs for children
- 2016: Getty Kids Hymnal: In Christ Alone
- 2017: Getty Kids Hymnal: For the Cause
- 2018: Getty Kids Hymnal: Family Hymn Sing
- 2019: Getty Kids Hymnal: Family Carol Sing
- 2020: Evensong: Hymns and Lullabies at the Close of Day

Evensong: Hymns and Lullabies at the Close of Day went to Billboard number 1 in 2020.

=== Orchestrator ===
In addition to his work with his wife as Keith & Kristyn Getty, Getty has also orchestrated or produced music for a number of other projects. These include orchestrations for Michael W. Smith's 2004 Healing Rain album, McDonald's television commercials, and Silvascreen label movie soundtrack recordings Music from the Lord of the Rings Trilogy and Once upon a Time: The Essential Ennio Morricone. He wrote and produced the music for the 1998 C. S. Lewis International Centenary Celebrations.

=== "In Christ Alone" song ===
In 2001, Stuart Townend and Getty wrote the song "In Christ Alone" with the purpose of creating a modern hymn that would explain the life of Christ. They released it on the Kingsway album New Irish Hymns, featuring vocalists Máire Brennan, Margaret Becker, and Joanne Hogg. The song gained popularity, and by 2005 it was named by a BBC Songs of Praise survey as the ninth best loved hymn of all time, and in their 2010 survey was named second best hymn of all time. The British Hymn Society nominated "In Christ Alone" as one of the top five hymns of all time, and BBC One's "Songs of Praise" nominated "In Christ Alone" as a top 10 hymn in 2012.

Since CCLI began tracking the weekly Top 100 songs from their license reporting in 2017, "In Christ Alone" has not once fallen from the list, and more of Getty's compositions appear in CCLI’s Top 500 Songs in the UK than those of any other songwriter.

== Recognition ==
Keith Getty received the O.B.E. (Officer of the Order of the British Empire) from Queen Elizabeth II, becoming the first church musician of the modern era to be given the award for contribution to music and hymn writing.

Getty has received honorary doctorates from Lancaster Bible College and Dallas Baptist University, and he has been awarded the Freedom of the City of Lisburn.

He is Honorary President and founder of the New Irish Arts, and Keith and Kristyn were both named fellows in 2019 of The Royal School of Church Music.

The album North Coast Sessions received a Dove award in 2019 for Inspirational Album of the Year.

A number of Getty Music Albums have been nominated for a Dove Award:

- The album, "Awaken the Dawn" was nominated for Inspirational Album of the year 2008.
- The album "Hymns for the Christian Life" was also nominated for a Dove award in 2013.
- Getty Kids Hymnal-For the Cause – Children's Music Album of the Year (2018)
- Getty Kids Hymnal-Family Carol Sing – Children's Music Album of the Year (2020)
- His Mercy Is More (the Hymnal of Matt Boswell and Matt Papa) – Inspirational Album of the Year (2020)
- Elizabeth (with Ellie Holcomb) – Roots/Americana Song of the Year (2020)

Evensong, Kristyn's album of hymns and lullabies to help people through the COVID-19 pandemic hit number one on USA Billboard Children's Album Charts.

== Television and special appearances ==
The couple has also appeared on national television (CBS, PBS, BBC), most notably on public television (PBS) in 2015 to 45 + million homes with their Christmas music special, Joy—An Irish Christmas, in 2021 for BBC Northern Ireland "At home with the Gettys" and a TBN in 2019 special filmed live at the world famous Grand Ole Opry House.

In 2017, the hymn writers performed for US Vice President Mike Pence and his wife Second Lady Karen Pence at the Vice President's residence. In addition the couple have performed for President George W. Bush, the United Nations, South Korean President Lee Myung-Bak, the Enthronement of the Archbishop of Canterbury and for former UK Prime Minister Theresa May.

== Discography ==
- 2002: Tapestry Keith Getty and Kristyn Lennox (Getty)
- 2003: New Irish Hymns 2 (with Margaret Becker and Joanne Hogg)
- 2004: New Irish Hymns 3: Incarnation (with Margaret Becker and Joanne Hogg)
- 2005: New Irish Hymns 4 (with Margaret Becker and Joanne Hogg)
- 2005: Songs That Jesus Said; a collection of songs for children
- 2007: In Christ Alone

== See also ==
- New Irish Hymns (album series)
