= New Irish Hymns =

New Irish Hymns (In Christ Alone: New Hymns for Prayer and Worship)

Studio album by Máire Brennan, Margaret Becker, Joanne Hogg
- Released: 2001
- Genres: Celtic music, Christian music
- Labels: Kingsway, Worship Together
- Producer: Keith Getty

New Irish Hymns (released as In Christ Alone: New Hymns for Prayer and Worship, or for short In Christ Alone in the US) is the first in a series of themed albums created and produced by Keith Getty.

This album features vocalists Máire Brennan, Margaret Becker and Joanne Hogg performing songs by Keith Getty and others (as indicated below). This album also marks the recorded debut of the Christian worship song, “In Christ Alone.” It was released in 2001 in Britain and 2002 in the rest of the world.

== Track listing ==
1. Your Hand O God Has Guided (One Church One Faith)
  (by Keith Getty, words adapted from a hymn by E.H. Plumptre)
2. With the Early Morning (Song of the Kingdom)*
  (words by Máire Brennan, music by Keith Getty)
3. Jesus Draw Me Ever Nearer (May This Journey)
  (words by Margaret Becker, music by Keith Getty)
4. Hear All Creation
  (words by Margaret Becker, music by Keith Getty)
5. My Hope
  (words by Richard Creighton, music by Keith Getty)
6. In Christ Alone
  (words by Stuart Townend, music by Keith Getty)
7. Like the Starlight (Your Song to Me)*
  (words by Kristyn Lennox, music by Keith Getty)
8. O for a Closer Walk
  (by Keith Getty, words adapted from a hymn by William Cowper)
9. This Fragile Vessel (Communion)*
  (words by Máire Brennan, music by Keith Getty)
10. Over Fields of Green (My Song Shall Rise to You)
  (words by Joanne Hogg, music by Keith Getty)

* indicates Máire Brennan solo track

== Credits ==
- Keith Getty – Composer, producer, orchestrator, piano
- Stephen Doherty – Executive producer
- Nigel Palmer – Co-producer
- Phil Keaggy, Jason Carter, Pete Kipley, Nick Fletcher, Fionán de Barra – Guitar (tracks not specified)
- Terl Bryant – Drums and percussion
- Tim Harries – Guitar
- Peter Wilson – Background vocals
- Troy Donockley – Pipes and whistles
- Dónal O'Connor, Dave Davidson, Maeve McKeown – Fiddle
- Prague Symphony Orchestra Strings
- © 2001 Kingsway Music

== Release history ==
Country	Release date
Europe	2001
United States	2002

== See also ==
- New Irish Hymns (series)
