= Sarah Sadler =

American singer-songwriter

- Born: Sarah Kathryn Sadler; North Carolina
- Origin: Nashville, Tennessee, US
- Genres: Christian, Americana, Country
- Occupations: Singer, songwriter
- Labels: Essential Records, Audioluxe Records
- Website: http://www.sarahsadler.com

Sarah Sadler is an American Contemporary Christian singer-songwriter and author. She has released two full-length albums, appeared on numerous compilation projects and is the author of Southern Solstice. The first album is her self-titled debut which was released in 2002 on Essential Records. "Beautiful," the first single from Sadler, won a Nielsen "Scan Award" for 30,000+ spins on CHR Radio. She released her second album, Where It Started, on Audioluxe Records in 2008.

== Discography ==
- Sarah Sadler (2002)
- Where It Started (2008)
