= Songs That Jesus Said =

Studio album by Keith Getty and Kristyn Getty
- Released: (European Union) 2005
- Genres: Children's music Christian
- Label: (European Union) Getty Music
- Producer: Joni McCabe

Songs That Jesus Said is the first studio album featuring songs by Keith Getty and Kristyn Getty intended specifically for children. A published score and CD tracks were released in conjunction with this CD. All songs on the album were written jointly by Keith Getty and Kristyn Getty, and most are based on specific passages of the Christian Bible, especially the four Gospels.

== Track listing ==
1. Better Is One Day with Jesus
  (Luke 10)
2. He Is My Light
  (John 8:12)
3. Underneath the Shining Star
  (Matthew 1-2)
4. Have You Seen Him?
  (Luke 9:18-20)
5. Two Little Houses
  (Matthew 7:24-27)
6. Stop and Think
  (Matthew 20:26-27)
7. Seed You Sow
  (Luke 8)
8. Store Up Good
  (Luke 6:45)
9. Little Zac
  (Luke 19:1-10)
10. Look to Jesus
  (John 4, John 7)
11. Once Upon a Boat
  (Matthew 8:23-27)
12. Let the Little Children Come
  (Matthew 19:13-15)
13. Father in Heaven
  (Matthew 6:9-13)
14. You Know
  (Matthew 10:29-31)
15. Remember
  (Matthew 6:25-31)
16. You Are the Shepherd
  (John 10:3-5)
17. In My Father's House
  (John 14:1-4)
18. The Grace Song of Heaven
19. Christ Has Risen
20. I'm Ready to Go
  (Matthew 28:18-20)

== Credits ==
- Joni McCabe – Producer
- Tim Oliver – Arranger
- Katrina McClay & Susie Young – Conductors
- Mudd Wallace - Engineer (Homestead Recording Studios, Northern Ireland)
- Dave Schober - Mastering
- Eric Wyse - ‘Final Touches’
- Leigh Merchant - Album Art
- (c) 2005 Getty Music
