= Richard D. Creighton =

- Born: January 25, 1924; Los Angeles, California, U.S.
- Died: 1988
- Military career
- Allegiance: United States
- Branch: United States Army Air Forces; United States Air Force
- Rank: Colonel
- Conflicts: World War II; Korean War
- Awards: Silver Star; Distinguished Flying Cross (4)

Richard D. Creighton (January 25, 1924 – 1988) was a United States Air Force flying ace during the Korean War, shooting down five enemy aircraft in the war.

== See also ==
- List of Korean War flying aces
