= Kristyn Getty =

Northern Irish Christian singer and songwriter (born 1980)

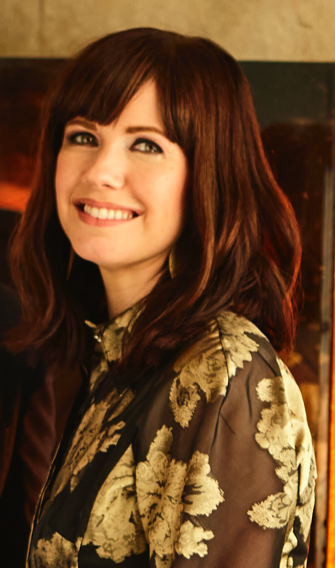
- Born: Kristyn Elizabeth Rebekah Lennox; 22 May 1980 (age 46)
- Occupations: Singer; songwriter; worship leader
- Spouse: Keith Getty (m. 2004)
- Website: gettymusic.com

Kristyn Elizabeth Rebekah Getty (née Lennox, born 22 May 1980 in Belfast) is a Grammy-nominated Northern Irish Christian artist, hymnwriter, author, and co-founder of the Getty Music organization and foundation.

== Career ==
=== Keith & Kristyn Getty ===
Main article: Keith & Kristyn Getty

Getty has headlined shows at Carnegie Hall, the Kennedy Center, the Sydney Opera House, Royal Albert Hall, the Grand Ole Opry House, and Ryman Auditorium. Hymns she has written and recorded are sung an estimated 100 million times per year.

Together, the Gettys founded the annual Sing! Conference in their adopted hometown of Nashville, Tennessee, and co-edited The Sing! Hymnal, published by Crossway in 2025. In 2020, Kristyn recorded the entire English Standard Version (ESV) Bible for Crossway.

== Collaborations ==
Getty has recorded collaborations with artists across numerous genres, including country artists Alison Krauss, Ricky Skaggs and Vince Gill; gospel artist Heather Headley, South African a capella chorus Ladysmith Black Mambazo, rapper Trip Lee, contemporary Christian artist Chris Tomlin, and Celtic folk singer Moya Brennan.

== Recognition ==
Christianity Today has described Getty as one of the world's "preeminent" hymn writers and credits her and her husband, Keith Getty, with having "changed the way evangelicals worship."

Getty's album Confessio–Irish American Roots was nominated for a 2022 Grammy Award in the Best Roots Gospel Album category.

Her album Evensong – Hymns and Lullabies at the Close of Day, which featured the Gettys' four daughters and collaborators from country, bluegrass, and contemporary Christian genres, reached #1 on Billboard's mainstream Kids Album chart in November 2000, displacing Disney's Frozen 2 soundtrack for the first time in 36 weeks.

She has won two GMA Dove Awards: 2019 Inspirational Album of the Year for The North Coast Sessions and 2022 Children's Album of the Year for Getty Kids Hymnal: Hymns from Home.

Her book Sing! How Worship Transforms Your Life, Family, and Church was a finalist in the Ministry Resources and New Author categories for the 2018 Christian Book Awards.

She was named a Fellow at the Royal School of Church Music in 2019, and was bestowed a 2025 "She Leads UK" award at Windsor Castle recognizing contributions to positive advancement of Christianity in Britain, and was named an International Woman of the Year by She Leads Tennessee in 2025.

In 2017, the Gettys performed for then-US Vice President Mike Pence and Second Lady Karen Pence at the vice president's residence, which is on the grounds of the Naval Observatory. They have performed for George W. Bush, the United Nations, former South Korean president Lee Myung-Bak, and former UK prime minister Theresa May.

According to CCLl, "In Christ Alone" ranks as the No.1 most-sung song in UK churches. Written by Stuart Townend and Keith Getty in 2001, the song is the second most popular hymn in the UK according to a survey conducted by the BBC's Songs of Praise programme.

Getty's two sold-out shows at Belfast SSE Arena in December 2024 were the highest-selling Christian music event in the history of Northern Ireland, the highest-selling carol service in the history of Northern Ireland, and the second two-night sellout of SEE Arena by a Northern Irish artist after Snow Patrol.

== Discography ==
Studio recordings as Kristyn Lennox

- Untitled EP (1997)
- Kristyn Lennox EP (2000)
- Focusfest: The Sound of Grace (with Geraldine Latty and Moya Brennan) (2001)
- Tapestry (with Keith Getty) (2002)
- Operation World (with Stuart Townend, Margaret Becker, et al.) (2002)
- Live It Up! (2002)
- Window on the World (2003)
- New Irish Hymns 2 (with Keith Getty, Margaret Becker and Joanne Hogg) (2003)

Studio recordings with Keith Getty

- New Irish Hymns 3: Incarnation (with Margaret Becker and Joanne Hogg) (2004)
- New Irish Hymns 4 (with Margaret Becker and Joanne Hogg) (2005)
- Songs That Jesus Said (a collection of songs for children) (2005)
- The Apostles' Creed (2006)
- In Christ Alone (2007)
- Awaken the Dawn (2009)
- Joy — An Irish Christmas (2011)
- Hymns for the Christian Life (2011)
- Facing a Task Unfinished (2016)
- The North Coast Sessions (2018)
- His Mercy Is More - The Hymns of Matt Boswell and Matt Papa (2019)
- Evensong: A Collection of Hymns and Lullabies at Close of Day (2020)
- Christ Our Hope in Life and Death (2022)
- Everything - Hymns for Little Hearts (2024)
- Come, Christians, Join to Sing (2025)

Getty Kids Hymnal Series

- Getty Kids Hymnal: In Christ Alone (2016)
- Getty Kids Hymnal: For the Cause (2017)
- Getty Kids Hymnal: Family Hymn Sing (2018)
- Getty Kids Hymnal: Family Carol Sing (2019)
- Getty Kids Hymnal: Hymns from Home (2021)

Live Recordings

- Modern Hymns Live (2006)
- Prom Praise (with the All Souls Orchestra); recorded live at the Royal Albert Hall (2008)
- Keswick Live (with Keith Getty, Stuart Townend, and Steve James, recorded at the Keswick Convention) (2008)
- Modern and Traditional Hymns: Live at the Gospel Coalition (2013)
- Joy - An Irish Christmas LIVE (2015)
- Sing! Live from the Getty Music Worship Conference (2017)
- Sing! Psalms Ancient and Modern: Live from the Getty Music Worship Conference (2018)
- Sing! An Irish Christmas - Live at the Grand Ole Opry House (2019)
- Quintology: The Life of Christ Quintology (2020)
- Sing! Global - Live at the Getty Music Worship Conference (2021)
- Sing! Christ Our Hope in Life and Death - Live at the Getty Music Worship Conference (2022)
- The Sing! Sessions: Doxology (2023)
- Sing! The Great Commission World Tour LIVE (2023)
- Sing! The Songs of the Bible (Live at the Getty Music Worship Conference) (2025)

== Bibliography ==
- Sing! How Worship Transforms Your Life, Family, and Church. B&H Publishing Group. 2017. ISBN 978-1-4627-4267-7.
- Joni Eareckson Tada: The Girl Who Learned to Follow God in a Wheelchair. The Good Book Company. 2024. ISBN 978-1-80254-067-3
- The Sing! Hymnal. Crossway. 2025. ISBN 979-8-8749-0080-9
- Pippa and the Singing Tree: Joining the Song of All Creation. Crossway. 2025. ISBN 978-1-4335-9351-2
- We Sing: Teaching Kids to Praise God with Heart and Voice. Crossway. 2025. ISBN 978-1-4335-9615-5
