= Christian Copyright Licensing International =

Company licencing works for worship

- Formerly: Starpraise Ministries
- Founded: January 1988; 38 years ago in Portland, Oregon, U.S.
- Founder: Howard Rachinski
- Headquarters: 17205 SE Mill Plain Blvd Suite 150, Vancouver, Washington, U.S.
- Areas served: Worldwide
- Key people: Malcolm Hawker, president and CEO; Howard Rachinski, founder
- Website: ccli.com

Christian Copyright Licensing International (CCLI) is a privately owned company that was founded in the US in 1988 by Howard Rachinski. CCLI was launched after being developed by Rachinski for 3½ years while he was a music minister at a large church in Portland, Oregon. This prototype, called Starpraise Ministries, began in May 1985. CCLI offers copyright licensing of songs and other resource materials for use in Christian worship.

Since its foundation, CCLI has expanded around the world to Australia, Botswana, Canada, Denmark, Faroe Islands, Finland, Germany, Iceland, Ireland, Lesotho, Malawi, Namibia, Netherlands, New Zealand, Norway, Singapore, South Africa, Swaziland, Sweden, Switzerland, United Kingdom, Zimbabwe, South Korea and as of 2016 can now serve most countries.

The mechanism of copyright solution invented by CCLI has been cited by the United States government and official copyright organization in United Kingdom when introducing the relevant policy.

CCLI is owned by SESAC.

== Services ==
The performance of works in copyright (for example, playing music) as part of an act of worship is specifically exempted from copyright laws in several countries. US Copyright Law [17 USC §110], for example, explicitly states that performances of "religious nature" during a service "at a place of worship or other religious assembly" are "not infringements of copyright." However, there are no exemptions for creating copies (e.g. printed, projection slides, recordings), translating, or making new arrangements. No license is needed if all music is in the public domain or covered by something like the Creative Commons licenses. As an example, most sufficiently old hymns are in the public domain. CCLI maintains a list of songs that are in the public domain. If all of the songs that an organization uses are in that list, then the organization does not need to pay the CCLI license fee. As of March 2015, CCLI's list contained nearly 24,000 public domain songs.

The licenses and services offered by CCLI include:

Church Copyright License

For the reproduction of words of songs for church worship use (The CCLI Church License does not allow a licensee to make copies of performance music pieces. From the CCLI.COM License: "3.0 restrictions: This license does not allow churches to do the following: Photocopy or duplicate any photo sheet music (octavos) cantadas, musicals, handbell music, keyboard music, vocal solo, or instrumental works.")

Photocopy / Music Reproduction License

For the photocopying of worship music

SongSelect

Online access of worship song lyrics, sound samples, and download of lead sheets, chord sheets, and soprano/alto/tenor/bass hymn sheets

Video License

In a joint venture with MPLC, under the company name of Christian Video Licensing International, for the copyright licensing of the playing of videos / DVDs for church activities

ScreenVue

CVLI introduced ScreenVue in 2003 as a separate service available for CVLI Video Licensees. ScreenVue offers both free and paid membership which gives the subscriber access to movie clips for illustration use in sermons or other presentations.

As of 10 February 2017, the annual fee for a US CCLI license ranged from $59 (for a church size less than 25 people) to $5,266 (for a church size greater than 200,000 people). License fees are similar for churches in other countries, taking exchange rates into account.

"CCLI distributes the majority of the License Fee to the copyright owners (i.e., publishers and songwriters) as royalties." More information about CCLI's royalty distribution policies is available on the CCLI web site. That page also says "Every year CCLI holds an Owner's Meeting for each region, where full details of License fees collected, and royalties distributed, are reported. Every song copyright owner participating in the Church Copyright License program is invited to the meeting for that region."
