= Joanne Hogg =

Northern Irish musician

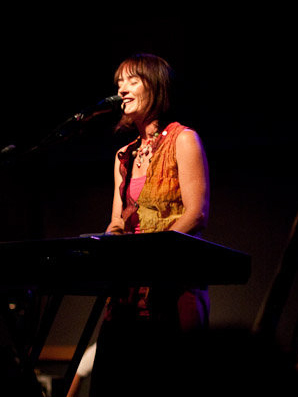
- Joanne Hogg during a 2010 Iona concert

Background information
- Occupation: Musician
- Instruments: Vocals; guitar; keyboards
- Website: Facebook

Joanne Hogg is a Northern Irish musician, best known for her work as the lead singer and songwriter with the Celtic Christian progressive rock band Iona.

== Early life and education ==
Hogg was born in Ballymena to a family of medical missionaries. Her father is a Presbyterian minister, her mother a nurse; her family also includes three sisters and two brothers. With medicine strong in the family, it was natural for Hogg to become a doctor and she studied medicine at Queen's University Belfast. In her third year, Hogg was singing at the Christian Artists talent event and was convinced to sing in a school ministry at Youth for Christ in Denmark. After a year, Hogg got married and returned to university to complete her two remaining years of schooling.

After graduating, Hogg interned as a junior doctor at Belfast City Hospital to complete her registration. Six months into working at the hospital, she was taken ill and stopped working for seven months to recover; after recovering, she completed her registration as a doctor, but was advised on medical grounds not to continue in full-time medical work for a year.

During her convalescence, she had been contacted by Dave Bainbridge and Dave Fitzgerald, who had considered forming a band. In 1989, Hogg ceased practising medicine, and Iona was born. Since then, Hogg has sung all over Europe and America. Iona's recordings have become successful worldwide, making them Europe's best-selling contemporary Christian band.

== Musical career ==
Hogg recorded her first solo album in 1999, entitled Looking into Light. The tracks that feature on this album are a selection of re-arranged traditional hymns, with Iona providing the instrumental melodies. In 2001, Hogg collaborated with vocalists Máire Brennan and Margaret Becker for the release New Irish Hymns. There have been a further three volumes of the New Irish Hymns series of albums involving other vocals. Iona also provided the instrumentals.

In 2008, Hogg released two solo albums, Raphael's Journey and Personal. Raphael's Journey is available only as a download and features friend Moya Brennan of Clannad. The album is available only through Kingsway Music UK. Hogg, in her personal press release, says:

Musically, this album is a collection of songs with a few instrumentals. Frank Van Essen has been working with me on this for several years not only as producer, but also co-writing and playing. There are beautiful performances from all my mates in Iona, gorgeous string arrangements from Frank, beautiful guest vocals from the amazing Moya Brennan and piano and vocals from myself......so, please download it and tell others about it."

Her Personal album was also released with a press release by Hogg, "to give fans the true story of the album".

Her vocals were further featured in the 1998 PlayStation role-playing video game Xenogears. Composed by Yasunori Mitsuda, the ending-theme song "Small Two of Pieces", along with an extra track "Stars of Tears" (not featured in the game) were recorded. Mitsuda also invited her to record the vocal themes for the spiritual sequel to Xenogears, Xenosaga: Episode One released four years later in 2002. Two tracks were recorded for this game: the ending-theme "Kokoro", and the song "Pain", which plays during the final cutscene of the game. Soundtracks were released for both of these videogames on the Digicube label. The song "Kokoro" was also released as a CD single. Hogg's vocals were not featured in any of the later Xenosaga releases, as Yasunori Mitsuda was replaced with Yuki Kajiura as the game's musical composer. Hogg later returned to the Xeno series with the release of Xenoblade Chronicles 3: Future Redeemed, for which she performed the ending theme, "Future Awaits", again composed by Mitsuda.

== Awards ==
Hogg has won the Classic Rock Society award for Best Female Vocalist on two occasions.

== Discography ==
- Looking into Light (1999)
- Celtic Hymns (2006; reissue of Looking into Light)
- Raphael's Journey (2008 download only, 2010 CD)
- Personal (2008)
- Uncountable Stars (2014)
- MAP Project (2018)
- Road from Ruin (2018)

=== Collaborations ===
- New Irish Hymns (2002) (with Moya Brennan and Margaret Becker)
- New Irish Hymns 2 (2003) (with Margaret Becker and Kristyn Getty)
- New Irish Hymns 3: Incarnation (2004) (with Margaret Becker and Kristyn Getty)
- New Irish Hymns 4 (2005) (with Margaret Becker and Kristyn Getty)
- Songs for Luca (with other Iona members and various other artists)
- Veil of Gossamer (with Dave Bainbridge)
- Xenogears Original Soundtrack (with Yasunori Mitsuda)
- Xenosaga Original Soundtrack (with Yasunori Mitsuda)
- Xenosaga: Episode One "Kokoro" Single (with Yasunori Mitsuda)
- The Unseen Stream (solo release by Troy Donockley)
- The Pursuit of Illusion (solo release by Troy Donockley)
- The Cave Sessions Vol.1 (with Andy Rogers)
- Xenoblade Chronicles 3 Original Soundtrack (with Yasunori Mitsuda) "Future Awaits"
