= Margaret Becker =

American singer (born 1959)

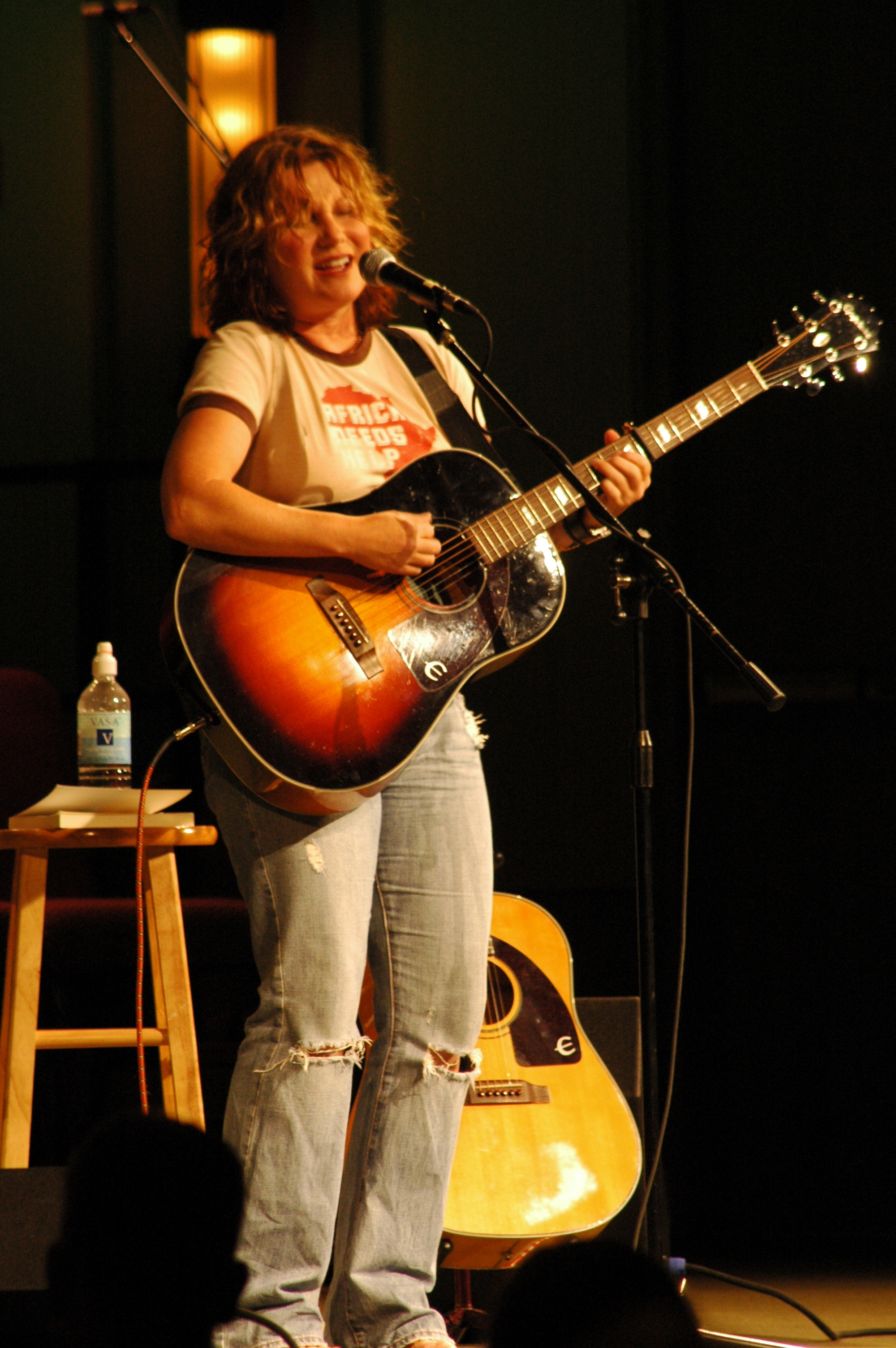
- In concert at Palm Beach Baptist Church, 2006

Background information
- Born: July 17, 1959 (age 67)
- Origin: Bay Shore, New York, U.S.
- Genres: Christian rock, CCM
- Instruments: Voice, guitar
- Years active: 1985–present
- Label: Sparrow
- Website: www.margaretbecker.com

Margaret Becker (born July 17, 1959) is an American Christian rock singer, guitarist, and songwriter. She has had twenty-one No. 1 Christian radio hits, won four Dove Awards, and been nominated for four Grammy Awards.

== Biography ==
Becker was born in Bay Shore, New York, United States, raised in East Islip, New York, and began playing in coffeehouses while teaching music and taking opera lessons. Having graduated from James Madison University with a degree in communication, she moved to Nashville, Tennessee in 1985, and signed to Sparrow Records as a songwriter; soon after she toured with Rick Cua as a backup singer and sang on Steve Camp's 1986 album One on One. The next year she landed a contract as a solo artist, and released her debut album, Never for Nothing. The single "Fight for God" was her first hit, and her second LP, The Reckoning, followed with two more hits, "Light in the Darkness" and "Find Me".

Becker began working with producer Charlie Peacock starting with 1989's Immigrant's Daughter, and a string of successful albums followed, including a Spanish language LP. She won two Dove Awards in 1992, for Rock Album (Simple House) and Rock Song ("Simple House"). However, in the late 1980s and early 1990s, Becker occasionally encountered controversy in the world of Contemporary Christian music because she is a Roman Catholic; some Christian stores refused to carry her album, and her concert appearances were sometimes picketed. Although she was raised in Catholicism, Margaret currently attends a non-denominational church in Nashville, Tennessee. After 1995's Grace, Becker decided to take a sabbatical from the music industry; during this time she wrote a book entitled With New Eyes and wrote editorials for Campus Life magazine.

She left Sparrow Records in 2002 but has continued to record since then, both her own albums and for compilation albums. She appears on the albums Sisters (Warner Bros. Records, 1994), Listen to Our Hearts (Sparrow, 1998), Heaven and Earth (Sparrow, 1999), and the New Irish Hymns series (Kingsway Music), and is one of the members of the 1994 collaboration Along the Road along with Susan Ashton and Christine Denté. She co-wrote Bob Carlisle's "Bridge Between Two Hearts". Her second book, Growing Up Together, appeared in 2000; her third, With New Eyes, came out in 2004, and a fourth, Coming Up for Air, was published in 2006. In late 2007, Becker's latest album, Air, was released.

Becker gives teaching seminars across the United States. She also produces records for other singers, and in 2006 she wrote a series of columns for CCM Magazine. Becker has also been active in supporting charities such as Habitat for Humanity, Compassion International, and World Vision.

Becker lives in Nashville, Tennessee.

== Discography ==
- Never for Nothing (Sparrow, 1987)
- The Reckoning (Sparrow, 1988)
- Immigrant's Daughter (Sparrow, 1989)
- Simple House (Sparrow, 1991)
- Soul (Sparrow, 1993)
- Fiel a Ti (in Spanish) (Sparrow, 1995)
- Grace (Sparrow, 1995)
- Falling Forward (Sparrow, 1998)
- What Kind of Love (Sparrow, 1999)
- My Refuge (Margaret Becker Productions, 2002)
- Just Come In (Cross Driven, 2003) (re-release of My Refuge)
- Faithfully Yours (Provident, 2004)
- Air (Go Global, 2007)

Collaborative works

- Along the Road (with Susan Ashton and Christine Denté) (Sparrow, 1994)
- New Irish Hymns (with Máire Brennan and Joanne Hogg) (released as In Christ Alone: New Hymns for Prayer and Worship in the US) (Kingsway Music, 2001)
- New Irish Hymns 2: Father, Son & Holy Spirit (with Joanne Hogg and Kristyn Lennox (Getty)) (Kingsway Music, 2003)
- New Irish Hymns 3: Incarnation (with Joanne Hogg and Kristyn Getty) (Kingsway Music, 2004)
- New Irish Hymns 4: Hymns For the Life of the Church (with Joanne Hogg and Kristyn Getty) (Kingsway Music, 2005)
- Hymns of Christmas (with Jennifer Knapp) (CD Baby, 2012)

Compilations

- Steps of Faith: 1987–1991 (Sparrow, 1992)
- Early Years (Chordant, 1996)
- Very Best of Margaret Becker (Sparrow, 2006)
