= Stuart Townend (musician) =

British Christian worship leader and songwriter (born 1963)

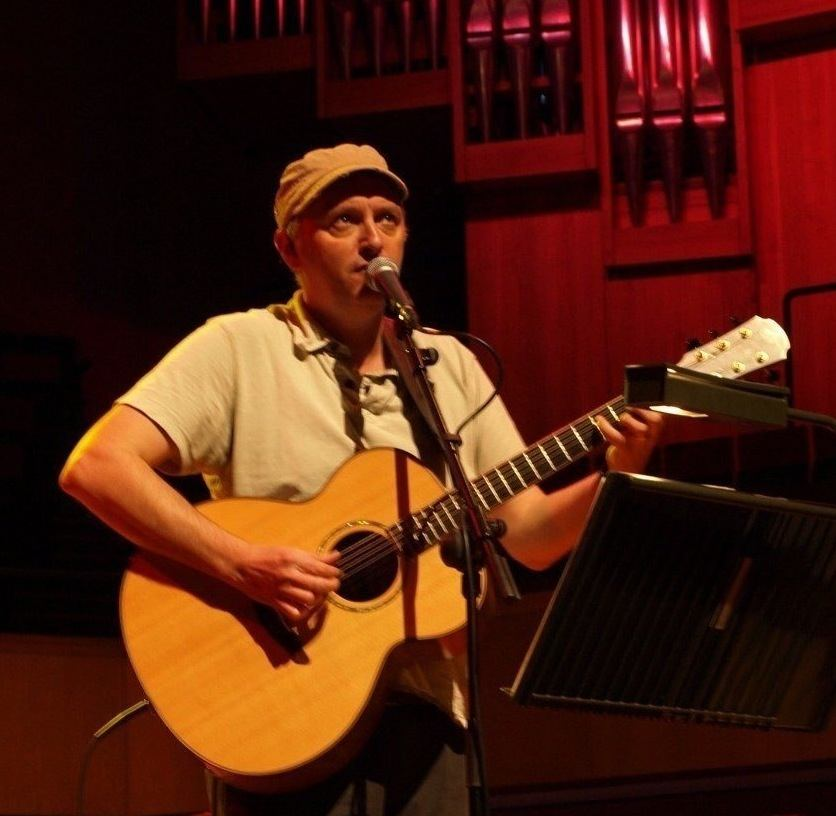
- Townend in October 2008

Background information
- Born: 1963 (age 62–63)
- Origin: West Yorkshire, England
- Genres: Contemporary Christian music, hymns, contemporary worship music
- Occupations: Songwriter, worship leader, music publishing executive
- Instruments: Guitar, Piano
- Label: Kingsway
- Spouse: Caroline (married 1988 - present)
- Website: stuarttownend.co.uk

Stuart Townend (born 1963) is an English Christian worship leader and writer of hymns and contemporary worship music. His songs include "In Christ Alone", (2001, co-written with Keith Getty, Townend's first collaboration with any other songwriter), "How Deep The Father's Love For Us", "Beautiful Saviour" and "The King of Love". As of 2008, Christian Copyright Licensing International (CCLI) lists "In Christ Alone" in its Top 25 CCLI Songs list.

== Career ==
Townend, son of a Church of England vicar in Sowerby Bridge, West Yorkshire has three older siblings. His father, Rev. John Townend, was vicar of Christ Church, Sowerby Bridge from 1974 until his death in a motor accident in 1985. Townend started learning to play the piano at age 7. At the age of 13, he made a Christian commitment, and began songwriting at age 22. He studied literature at the University of Sussex.

He is married with three children.

Townend has led musical/sung worship and performed events across the world at conferences and festivals, including the Stoneleigh Bible Week in the early 1990s to the early 2000s, Keswick Convention and Spring Harvest. He has appeared on Songs of Praise and worked with other Christian musicians, including Keith Getty, Lou Fellingham and Phatfish.

In 2005, Cross Rhythms magazine described Townend as "one of the most significant songwriters in the whole international Christian music field". The Christian website Crosswalk.com commented, "the uniqueness of Townend’s writing lies partly in its lyrical content. There is both a theological depth and poetic expression that some say is rare in today’s worship writing".

== Honours ==
In June 2017, he was awarded the Cranmer Award for Worship by the Archbishop of Canterbury "for his outstanding contribution to contemporary worship music".

== Discography ==
=== Audio ===
- Classical Praise Piano: Come Holy Spirit (1995)
- Say the Word (1997)
- Personal Worship (2001)
- Lord of Every Heart (2002)
- Monument to Mercy (2006)
- The Best of Stuart Townend Live (2007)
- There is a Hope (live) (2008)
- Creation Sings (2009)
- The Journey (2011)
- Ultimate Collection (2012)
- The Paths of Grace (2014)
- The Best of Stuart Townend Live, Volume 2 (2015)
- In Christ Alone: Songs of Stuart Townend & Keith Getty (2016)
- Courage (2018)

=== Audio—featuring Townend ===
- Stoneleigh Bible Week albums, 1994–2001
- Mandate—O Church Arise
- Mandate—See What A Morning
- In Christ Alone- Live Worship from CHURCH of CHRIST the KING, featuring The Stoneleigh Band(2002)
- Newfrontiers albums, 2004–2006
- Mission:Worship albums, 2006–present
- Phatfish—Hope—Unplugged Live (2002)
- Keswick Convention albums, 2007–present
- Spring Harvest albums

=== Video ===
- There is a Hope (live) (DVD 2008)
- Creation Sings (DVD 2009)

=== Video—featuring Townend ===
- Mission:Worship—Just One Touch From The King (DVD 2007)
- Worship From The Abbey (DVD 2007)
- Phatfish—There Is A Day (DVD 2006)
- Phatfish—Hope—Unplugged Live (VHS 2002)

=== With Keith Getty ===
- The Apostles' Creed
- In Christ Alone
- The Power Of The Cross
