= Open Sky (disambiguation) =

Open Sky is a 2000 album from the Progressive rock band Iona.

Open Sky may also refer to:

== Transportation ==
- ASEAN Open Sky Agreement, an aviation policy
- Open-wheel car, called an open sky car
- OpenSky M-02, Japanese project to create a "Möwe" jet-powered glider
- OpenSky Network, non-commercial, research-oriented flight tracking platform

== Music ==
- Open Sky, progressive rock album by Iona,
- Open Sky Records, recording company and label Open Sky used by Iona

== Other ==
- Project Open Sky, series of flight simulator programs
- OpenSky, wireless communication system invented in Massachusetts
- OpenSky service, hosted SIP (Session Initiation Protocol) to Skype gateway
- The Open Sky or El cielo abierto, 2000 Spanish movie

== See also ==
- Open skies (disambiguation)
- Sky Open (TV channel), New Zealand TV channel
- Sky Open (squash), men's squash tournament in Cairo, Egypt
