= Veil of Gossamer =

Studio album by Dave Bainbridge
- Released: 26 July 2004
- Recorded: Open Sky Studio, Lincolnshire; November 2003 to February 2004
- Genre: Progressive rock
- Length: 64:19
- Label: Open Sky Records
- Producer: Dave Bainbridge

Veil of Gossamer is a 2004 album by English rock musician Dave Bainbridge.

A notable source of inspiration for Veil of Gossamer, particularly for the song "Star-Filled Sky," came from a story that is said to have occurred in the 7th century: A young shepherd boy, whilst tending his flock on the Northumbrian hills, saw a strange sight in the sky in the distance near Bamburgh and Lindisfarne. It amounted to 'lights' ascending and descending from the heavens. The next day, this experience appeared to coincide with the death of the celtic saint, St. Aidan. The young shepherd was Cuthbert, who became a great church leader and saint himself, and who eventually succeeded St. Aidan.

Recordings took place at the following:

- Open Sky Studio, Lincolnshire - (Engineer Dave Bainbridge)

also at

- Studio Frank van Esses, Dalfsen, Holland - (for Frank's contributions)
- Nick Beggs' studio, UK - (for Nick's basses)
- Peter Whitfield's studio, UK - (for Peter's strings)
- The Buddy Project, New York City, USA - (for Chris Hale's vocals)
- various other places around Wales, Ireland, Scotland and England during 2003 and 2004

== Personnel ==
=== Band ===
- Dave Bainbridge - Keyboards, Electric and Acoustic Guitars, Piano, Bouzouki, Mandolin, Balafon, 15 String Harp, Star Bells, Bongos, Hand Drum, Indian Tambourine, Shakers, Finger Cymbals
- Mae McKenna - Vocals (wordless, Gaelic)
- Rachel Jones - Vocals (wordless, whispered)
- Joanne Hogg - Vocals (wordless, ethereal, Spanish)
- Chris Hale - Improvised Vocals (wordless, Urdu)
- Troy Donockley - Uilleann Pipes, Tin Whistles, Low Whistles, Vocals
- Tim Harries - Bass Guitar
- Frank van Essen - Drums, Percussion, Violin, Bodhran, Bells
- Peter Fairclough - Cymbal Sculptures, Gongs, Wind Chimes, Cymbals.
- Nick Beggs - Bass Guitar, Fretless Bass
- Peter Whitfield - Violins, Violas
- William Schofield - Solo Cello

== Track listing ==
1. Chanting Waves – 02:17
2. Over the Waters – 07:29
3. Veil of Gossamer – 04:55
4. The Seen and the Unseen – 02:18
5. The Everlasting Hills: Part 1 – 05:36
6. The Everlasting Hills: Part 2 – 02:34
7. The Everlasting Hills: Part 3 – 03:54
8. The Everlasting Hills: Part 4 – 02:54
9. The Everlasting Hills: Part 5 – 04:36
10. Seahouses – 03:06
11. Until the Tide Turns – 04:29
12. The Homeward Race – 05:25
13. Star-Filled Skies: Part 1 – 03:39
14. Star-Filled Skies: Part 2 – 02:40
15. Star-Filled Skies: Part 3 – 03:46
16. Star-Filled Skies: Part 4 – 04:41

Total Time 64:19

== Release Details ==
- 2004, UK, Open Sky Records OPENVP4CD
