= Woven Cord =

Studio album by Iona with All Souls Orchestra
- Released: October 1999
- Recorded: Royal Festival Hall, London on 29 May 1999
- Genre: Progressive rock, Celtic rock, Christian rock
- Length: 78:08
- Label: Alliance; Open Sky Records re-release 2005
- Producer: Dave Bainbridge

Iona with All Souls Orchestra chronology
Heaven's Bright Sun (1997)	Woven Cord (1999)	Open Sky (2000)

Woven Cord is a live progressive rock album by Iona with the All Souls Orchestra, released in 1999. It was recorded on 29 May 1999 at the Royal Festival Hall in London, when Iona joined with the All Souls Orchestra for a unique collaboration to celebrate the band's tenth anniversary. Additional recording was made at Visions of Albion, Yorkshire, in July and August 1999. The engineers were Nigel Palmer and Matt Parkin.

== Personnel ==
=== Band ===
- Joanne Hogg - vocals, acoustic guitar, keyboards
- Dave Bainbridge - guitars, keyboards, bouzouki
- Phil Barker - bass guitar
- Frank Van Essen - drums, percussion, violin
- Troy Donockley - Uilleann pipes, whistles, cittern, guitars, keyboards, vocals

=== Additional musicians and special guests ===
- Nick Beggs - Chapman Stick (on "Man" and "Revelation")
- Tim Harries - double bass
- Marlou Van Essen - backing vocals (on "Lindisfarne", "Dancing On The Wall", "Revelation")
- All Souls Orchestra - orchestral instruments
- Noel Tredinnick - conductor, arranger

== Track listing ==
Disc 1 - total time 78:08

1. "Overture" – 5:01
2. "Bi"-Se I Mo Shuil Pt. 1 – 2:33
3. "Matthew" - The Man – 13:01
4. "White Sands" – 4:15
5. "Murlough Bay" – 4:17
6. "Dancing on the Wall" – 5:27
7. "Encircling" – 12:24
8. "Lindisfarne" – 7:52
9. "Revelation" – 7:00
10. "Woven Cord" – 9:25
11. "Beyond These Shores" – 6:53

== Release details ==
- 1999, UK, Alliance Records ALD 1901802, release date ? October 1999, CD
- 1999, USA, Forefront Records FFD-5246, release date ? October 1999, CD
- 2005, UK, Open Sky Records OPENVP6CD, release date 20 June 2005, CD
