= Heaven's Bright Sun =

Live album by Iona
- Released: January 1997
- Recorded: Various locations in England, December 1996
- Genre: Progressive rock, Celtic rock, Christian rock
- Length: 111:21
- Label: ForeFront Records; Open Sky Records re-release 2005
- Producer: Dave Bainbridge

Iona chronology
Treasures (1996)	Heaven's Bright Sun (1997)	Woven Cord (1999)

Professional ratings
Review scores
Source	Rating
Allmusic	link

Heaven's Bright Sun is a live progressive rock album by Iona, released in 1997.

Recordings were made under engineer Nigel Palmer by the B-I-H mobile 'Live' in England during December 1996, at the Irish Centre, Leeds, the Q Club, Birmingham, and The Amulet, Shepton Mallet.

== Personnel ==
- Joanne Hogg - vocals, acoustic guitar, keyboards, shaker
- Dave Bainbridge - guitars, keyboards
- Phil Barker - bass guitar
- Terl Bryant - drums, percussion
- Troy Donockley - Uilleann pipes, low whistles, tin whistle, guitars, e-bow slide guitar, keyboards, cittern, vocals
- Mike Haughton - saxophone, flute, tin whistle, vocals, tambourine

== Track listing ==
- Disc 1 - total time 48:39
1. "Turning Tide" – 2:23
2. "Treasure" – 4:56
3. "Flight of the Wild Goose" – 5:42
4. "Today" – 3:29
5. "Irish Day" – 6:11
6. "Luke" – 3:45
7. "Inside My Heart" – 6:51
8. "Trilogy" – 8:47
9. "I Will Give My Love an Apple" – 6:35
- Disc 2 - Total Time 62:42
1. The Island – 5:55
2. Iona – 6:39
3. Columcille – 4:14
4. Heaven's Bright Sun – 7:54
5. Chi-Rho – 5:04
6. Bi-Se I Mo Shuil Part 2 – 4:48
7. Kells Theme – 6:28
8. Reels – 7:34
9. When I Survey – 14:06

== Release details ==
- 1997, UK, Alliance Records ALD 092, release date January 1997, CD
- 1997, UK, Alliance Records ALC 092, release date January 1997, cassette
- 1997, USA, Forefront Records FFD-5178, release date January 1997, CD
- 2005, UK, Open Sky Records OPENVP7CD, release date 13 June 2005, CD
