= Columcille (album) =

Studio album by Dave Fitzgerald
- Released: 1995
- Recorded: ICC Studios, Eastbourne, England between December 1994 and March 1995
- Genre: Celtic music, Christian music
- Label: ICC Records
- Producer: Nigel Palmer & Dave Fitzgerald

Dave Fitzgerald chronology
Columcille (1995)	Lux Aeterna (1997)

Columcille is the debut solo album from flute and saxophone player Dave Fitzgerald who was a founding member of Iona. It was released in 1995.

== Track listing ==
1. "Veni Creator" – 3:24
2. "Veni Veni Emmanuel" – 6:54
3. "The Lark Ascending" – 3:54
4. "Sea of Glass" – 4:09
5. "In Paradisum" – 4:50
6. "Were You There" – 4:51
7. "The Dream" – 8:25
8. "Beata Viscera" – 5:35
9. "Columcille: Dove of the Church" – 2:47
10. "When I Survey" – 2:55

== Personnel ==
- Dave Fitzgerald - Soprano & Tenor Saxophones, Flutes, Assorted Woodwind
- Tim Oliver - Keyboards
- Tim Brown - Counter Tenor, Vocals
- Vanessa Freeman - Vocals (on Were You There)
- Claire Tomlin - Soprano, Vocals (on The Dream & When I Survey)
- Martin Neil - Percussion
- Dave Clifton - Assorted Guitars

== Release Details ==
- 1995, UK, ICC Records ICCD12730, Release Date ? ? 1995, CD
- 1995, UK, ICC Records ICC12720, Release Date ? ? 1995, Cassette
