= Ravenchild =

Studio album by Maddy Prior
- Released: 1999
- Recorded: 1999
- Genre: Folk
- Length: 52:08
- Producer: Troy Donockley, Nick Holland

Maddy Prior chronology
Flesh and Blood (1997)	Ravenchild (1999)	Ballads and Candles (2000)

Professional ratings
Review scores
Source	Rating
Allmusic	link

Ravenchild is the first album recorded by Maddy Prior after she stopped working with the Carnival Band.

It has a distinctive flavour that we can now recognise as the influence of Troy Donockley. There are frequent sound effects such as wind, echo and washes of synthesiser chords. Alongside 5 traditional songs are ones written or very much adapted by Maddy. In general she is strong on words, but not so memorable with her self-composed tunes. The well-known song "Rigs of the Times" is here updated to offer social criticism of monopolies and faceless international industries. "Rich Pickings" contains the first example of Maddy singing in rap style. By far the best track is "Dance of the Wind". In an exultant extended guitar solo, Troy Donockley sounds like Mike Oldfield. It is surprising that he is not given co-authorship of this track. "Bold Poacher" is a song that Maddy had sung with Steeleye Span on "Parcel of Rogues", but Tim Hart had sung the lead vocals in that version. Maddy admits that she had previously been embarrassed to sing "Twankydillo" because of the silly-sounding title, but once she discovered that "Twanky" means "gin" (as in "widow twanky") she liked it once again. Tracks 3,4 and 5 are continuous. Tracks 3 to 6 have the heading "With Napoleon in Russia". Tracks 7 to 12 have the heading "In the Company of Ravens".

== Track listing ==
1. "Twankydillo" (Trad) – 2:57
2. "Bold Poachers" (Trad) – 4:12
3. "Boney (Shanty: Boney was a Warrior)" (Trad) – 1:51
4. "Scorched Earth (The Bonny Bunch of Roses)" (Trad) – 4:21
5. "Loot" (Words: M Prior/ Tune: Trad) – 5:00
6. "Rigs of the Times" (Words: M Prior/ Tune: Trad) – 4:06
7. "In the Company of Ravens" (Maddy Prior) – 3:09
8. "Young Bloods" (Maddy Prior) – 4:09
9. "The Masts of Morrigan" (Maddy Prior) – 3:42
10. "Rich Pickings" (Maddy Prior) – 4:32
11. "Ravenchild" (Maddy Prior) – 3:00
12. "Dance on the Wind" (Maddy Prior) – 3:56
13. "Great Silkie of Sules Skerry" (Trad) – 6:56

== Personnel ==
- Maddy Prior - vocals
- Nick Holland - keyboards, backing vocals
- Troy Donockley - Uilleann pipes, electric and acoustic guitars, low whistle, tin whistle, cittern, backing vocals
- Terl Bryant - drums and percussion
- Nick Beggs - Chapman Stick
