= The Circling Hour =

Studio album by Iona
- Released: Oct 2, 2006
- Recorded: 2005
- Genres: Progressive rock, Celtic rock, Christian rock
- Length: 65:00
- Label: Open Sky Records 2006
- Producer: Dave Bainbridge

Iona chronology
| The River Flows (2002) | The Circling Hour (2006) | Another Realm (2011) |

Professional ratings
Review scores
| Source | Rating |
|---|---|
| The Phantom Tollbooth | (?) |
| DPRP | 8.5/10 stars |

The Circling Hour is a progressive rock album by Iona, released in 2006. It marked a return to the studio for the band after a break of nearly six years to record a full album.

== Track listing ==
1. "Empyrean Dawn" – 7:49
2. "Children of Time" – 5:33
3. "Strength" – 5:59
4. "Wind off the Lake" – 11:02
5. "Factory of Magnificent Souls" – 5:02
6. "Sky Maps" – 6:39
7. "No Fear in Love" – 5:59
8. "Wind, Water & Fire - Wind" – 3:30
9. "Wind, Water & Fire - Water" – 3:00
10. "Wind, Water & Fire - Fire" – 7:14
11. "Fragments of a Fiery Sun" – 2:45

== Additional Tracks "Companion Album" released 2021 ==
The Companion Album (Open Sky Label – OPENVP17CD)

1. The Everbeating Sea #1
2. The Everbeating Sea #2
3. Children Of Time
4. Strength #1
5. Strength #2
6. Factory Of Magnificent Souls
7. Skymaps
8. Fire
9. Fragment (Of A Fiery Sun) #1
10. Fragment (Of A Fiery Sun) #2
11. Summer's Afternoon
12. Strength Reprise #1
13. Strength Reprise #2
14. Strength Reprise #3
15. Life Is Precious
16. Faith
17. Untitled Sketch
18. Spirit Of God
19. Almighty Father Who Dost Give
20. Fragment (Of A Fiery Sun) #3

== Personnel ==
=== Band ===
- Joanne Hogg - lead and backing vocals, choir chorus, keyboards
- Dave Bainbridge - electric and acoustic guitars, keyboards, bouzouki, choir voices, Hammond organ, wind chimes, high-strung acoustic and electric guitars, mandolin, piano, e-bow guitars
- Troy Donockley - Uilleann pipes, low and high whistles, tofran, bouzouki, vocals, choir voices, e-bow guitar, slide guitar
- Frank Van Essen - drums, bodhran, shaker, violin, choir voices, darabukkas, finger cymbals, tambourine, djembe, drum pads, tom toms, violas
- Phil Barker - bass guitar

=== Additional musician and special guest ===
- Heather Findlay - vocals (on" Fragments of a Fiery Sun")

=== Production ===
- Recorded between July 2005 and March 2006 at Open Sky Studio, Lincolnshire, England, and Studio Frank van Essen, Drachten, Holland
- Additional recording at Waterworld, Yorkshire, England
- Hammond organ and piano recorded at Chapel Studios, Lincolnshire, England (engineer Will Bartle)
- Digital transfers made at DB Studios, Lincoln, England
- Recorded by Dave Bainbridge, Frank van Essen and Troy Donockley
- Produced by Dave Bainbridge
- Mixed by John Kellogg with Dave Bainbridge and Troy Donockley, at Immergent Studios, Los Angeles
- Mastered by Denis Blackham, Isle of Skye, Scotland

== Release details ==
- 2006, UK, Open Sky Records OPENVP11CD, release date September 2006, CD
