= Mermaid Kiss =

English band

Mermaid Kiss is an English band formed in Kington, Herefordshire, England, in 2000, with influences ranging from contemporary folk music to progressive rock.

== Biography ==
The initial line up was: Evelyn Downing (voice and flute) Jamie Field (guitar and bass) and Andrew Garman (keyboard, bass, and drums). In the beginning the band was envisaged purely as a studio project, and in June 2003 they released a 14 track debut album, The Mermaid Kiss Album, and following many requests they made their live debut on 21 December 2003, at The Rock Cafe 2000, Stourbridge supporting Karnataka.

In September 2004, Downing left Kington to further her studies at University in Manchester, and two guest vocalists, Kate Belcher and Kate Emerson, were recruited by Field and Garman. Guitarist Nigel Hooton also joined the band at this time. The band's second release in February 2006, a 7 track EP entitled Salt On Skin, contained songs featuring vocals by both Downing, Belcher, and Emerson. The artwork and photography for the CD was by Chris Walkden. One of the songs on the EP, "The Blushing Bride", featured guitar work of Panic Room (and former Karnataka) guitarist, Paul Davies.

A second album, Etarlis, was released on 18 June 2007. Etarlis was described by the band as a series of musical illustrations of the fantasy story of the same name, written by Field and Downing over the past years. The album's eleven tracks were written and arranged by Field and Garman. Kate Belcher once again featured as a guest vocalist on this album, in addition to which a range of woodwind instruments were played by Wendy Marks. Further guest appearances from Troy Donockley (Iona) on uilleann pipes and Jonathan Edwards (Panic Room and ex Karnataka) on keyboards were also featured.

Following her contribution to Etarlis, Wendy Marks joined the band as a full member in 2008. Garman and Hooton subsequently departed the band, and the new line-up was augmented by Colin Henney (keyboards), Peter West (bass), and Steve White (drums). With this lineup the band released their third full-length album, 'Another Country', in 2012.

Shortly after the release of 'Another Country' Downing departed the band and was replaced by Maria Milewska. The band subsequently dissolved in 2013, with Field, Marks, and Milewska forming new band Zero She Flies with keyboardist Jeremy Robberechts and bassist Shane Webb.

== Personnel ==
Former members

- Evelyn Downing - vocals, flute (2000-2012)
- Jamie Field - guitars, bass (2000-2013)
- Andrew Garman - keyboards, bass, drums (2000-2010)
- Nigel Hooton - guitars (2004-2010)
- Wendy Marks - cor anglais, flute, oboe, recorder, backing vocals (2008-2013)
- Colin Henney - keyboards (2010-2013)
- Peter West - bass (2010-2013)
- Steve White - drums (2010-2013)
- Maria Milewska - vocals, flute, piano (2012-2013)

Guest musicians

- Kate Belcher - vocals (Salt on Skin, Etarlis)
- Paul Davies - guitars (Salt on Skin)
- Kate Emerson - vocals (Salt on Skin)
- Troy Donockley- uilleann pipes (Etarlis)
- Jonathan Edwards - keyboards (Etarlis)
- Richard Northwood - bass (Another Country)

== Discography ==
Studio albums

- The Mermaid Kiss Album (2003)
- Etarlis (2007)
- Another Country (2012)

EPs

- Salt on Skin (2006)
