= Journey into the Morn =

Studio album by Iona
- Released: February 1996
- Recorded: 1995
- Studio: The Soundfield, Derbyshire; Perfect Sounds, Thornton, Nr. Bradford
- Genre: Progressive rock, Celtic rock, Christian rock
- Length: 78:14
- Label: Alliance Music
- Producer: Dave Bainbridge

Iona chronology
Beyond These Shores (1993)	Journey into the Morn (1996)	Treasures (1996)

Professional ratings
Review scores
Source	Rating
AllMusic	4/5 stars

Journey Into The Morn is a progressive rock album by Iona. Released in 1996. It was their first studio album since Beyond These Shores in 1993.

Recordings were based in the north of England again The Soundfield, Derbyshire with audio engineer Neil Costello, with some additional recording at Perfect Sounds, Thornton, Nr. Bradford.

== Personnel ==
Band

- Joanne Hogg - vocals, guitar
- Dave Bainbridge - guitars, keyboards, e-bow guitar, mandolin, mandola
- Tim Harries - bass, vocals
- Terl Bryant - drums, percussion
- Troy Donockley - uilleann pipes, low whistles, tin whistle, vocals, whitby shell chimes
- Mike Haughton - saxophone, flute, tin whistle, vocals

Additional musicians and special guests

- Máire Brennan - Celtic harp, vocals
- Robert Fripp - guitar synth, Frippertronics on "Divine Presence" and "The Search"
- Peter Whitfield - violins, viola
- Chris Eaton - additional backing vocals

== Track listing ==
Disc - Total Time 78:14

1. "Bi-Se I Mo Shúil" Part 1 – 2:06
2. "Irish Day" – 5:14
3. "Wisdom" – 4:58
4. "Everything Changes" – 5:34
5. "Inside My Heart" – 6:09
6. "Encircling" – 11:41
7. "Journey Into the Morn" – 2:58
8. "Lindisfarne" – 6:30
9. "No Heart Beats" – 4:49
10. "The Search" – 2:42
11. "Divine Presence" – 5:29
12. "Heaven's Bright Sun" – 7:26
13. "Bi-Se I Mo Shuil" Part 2 – 4:33
14. "When I Survey" – 8:05

== Release details ==
- 1996, UK, Alliance Records ALD 050, Release Date 20 February 1996, CD
- 1996, UK, Alliance Records ALC 050, Release Date 20 February 1996, Cassette
- 1996, U.S., Forefront Records FFD-5142, Release Date 20 February 1996, CD
- 1996, U.S., Forefront Records FFC-5142, Release Date 20 February 1996, Cassette
- 2005, UK, Open Sky Records OPENVP9CD, Release Date 5 November 2005, CD
