= The Book of Kells (album) =

Studio album by Iona
- Released: 1992; Remaster Rereleased 3 November 2003
- Recorded: Various Locations, early 1992
- Genre: Progressive rock, Celtic rock, Christian rock
- Length: 72:21
- Label: What Records, label of Word Records
- Producer: Dave Bainbridge

Iona chronology
Iona (1990)	The Book of Kells (1992)	Beyond These Shores (1993)

Professional ratings
Review scores
Source	Rating
Allmusic	link

The Book of Kells is a progressive rock album by Iona that was released in 1992. The Book of Kells, an 8th-century manuscript filled with lush pictures illustrating the Gospels, possibly originating from the monastery at Iona, serves as the album's namesake.

Again, the recording process moved around the country for suitable facilities:

- Wildlife Studio, Ipswich - (Engineer Nigel Palmer)
- Studio 2, Leeds - (Engineer Rob Price)
- Kensington Temple Church - (Engineer Nigel Palmer) for the Heavenly Hosts

The recording was remastered for the 2002 release The River Flows: Anthology and later re-released on Open Sky Records as a standalone album.

== Personnel ==
=== Band ===
- Joanne Hogg - Vocals, Keyboards
- Dave Bainbridge - Keyboards, Guitar, Chimes
- Nick Beggs - Chapman Stick, Bass guitar, Small Cymbals
- Terl Bryant - Drums, Percussion
- Dave Fitzgerald - Saxophone, Flageolets, Flute, Piccolo, Chinese Flutes, Dizi, Suona

=== Additional musicians and special guests ===
- Frank van Essen - Drums, Percussion, Violin
- Troy Donockley - Uilleann pipes, Low Whistles
- Fiona Davidson - Celtic Harp
- Peter Whitfield - Ensemble Violins, Viola
- Kensington Temple Church congregation - Heavenly Hosts

== Track listing ==
- Disc - Total Time 72:21
1. Kells Opening Theme – 4:18
2. Revelation – 4:38
3. Mathew-The Man – 11:54
4. Chi-Rho – 4:39
5. Mark-The Lion – 3:29
6. The River Flows – 5:01
7. Luke-The Calf – 4:03
8. Virgin and Child – 3:16
9. Temptation – 4:34
10. The Arrest-Gethsemane – 3:49
11. Trinity-The Godhead – 6:09
12. John-The Eagle – 4:15
13. Kells – 5:29
14. Eternity-No Beginning No End – 6:47

== Release details ==
- 1992, UK, What Records WHAR 1287, Release Date ? ? 1992, LP
- 1992, UK, What Records WHAD 1287, Release Date ? ? 1992, CD
- 1992, UK, What Records WHAC 1287, Release Date ? ? 1992, Cassette
- 1992, USA, Forefront Records FFD-3001, Release Date ? ? 1992, CD
- 2003, UK, Open Sky Records OPENVP2CD, Release Date 3 November 2003, CD
