= From Silence =

Studio album by Troy Donockley & Dave Bainbridge
- Released: 2005
- Recorded: 2005
- Genre: Instrumental atmospheric ambient, Minimalist celtic folk
- Length: 56:14
- Label: Open Sky Records

Troy Donockley & Dave Bainbridge chronology
When Worlds Collide (2005)	From Silence (2005)

From Silence is a progressive rock album by Troy Donockley and Dave Bainbridge. It is an improvised piece recorded in the setting of the Lincoln Cathedral and released in 2005. This recording shows Troy Donockley as a multi-skilled woodwind player. His main instrument is the Uilleann Pipes while also adding low whistles, electric and acoustic guitars, keys, cittern and the mandolin. His musical partner is his colleague from Iona, the guitarist and keyboard player Dave Bainbridge.

The collaboration was initiated by Voiceprint's Bob Ayling.

== Critical reception ==
Gary Hill of Music Street Journal said: "As can be expected, much of the music here has a decidedly Celtic sound. The sound the two artists achieve is quite pretty and sedate."

== Track listing ==
Disc - Total Time 56:14

1. From Silence: Part One – 9:45
2. From Silence: Part Two – 6:15
3. From Silence: Part Three – 15:51
4. From Silence: Part Four – 9:04
5. From Silence: Part Five – 9:44
6. From Silence: Part Six – 5:35

== Personnel ==
- Troy Donockley - Uilleann pipes, low whistles, acoustic guitars, tin whistles, vocals
- Dave Bainbridge - piano, electric guitars, bouzouki

== Release details ==
- 2005, UK, Open Sky OPENVP5CD
