= John Young (British musician) =

British rock musician (born 1956)

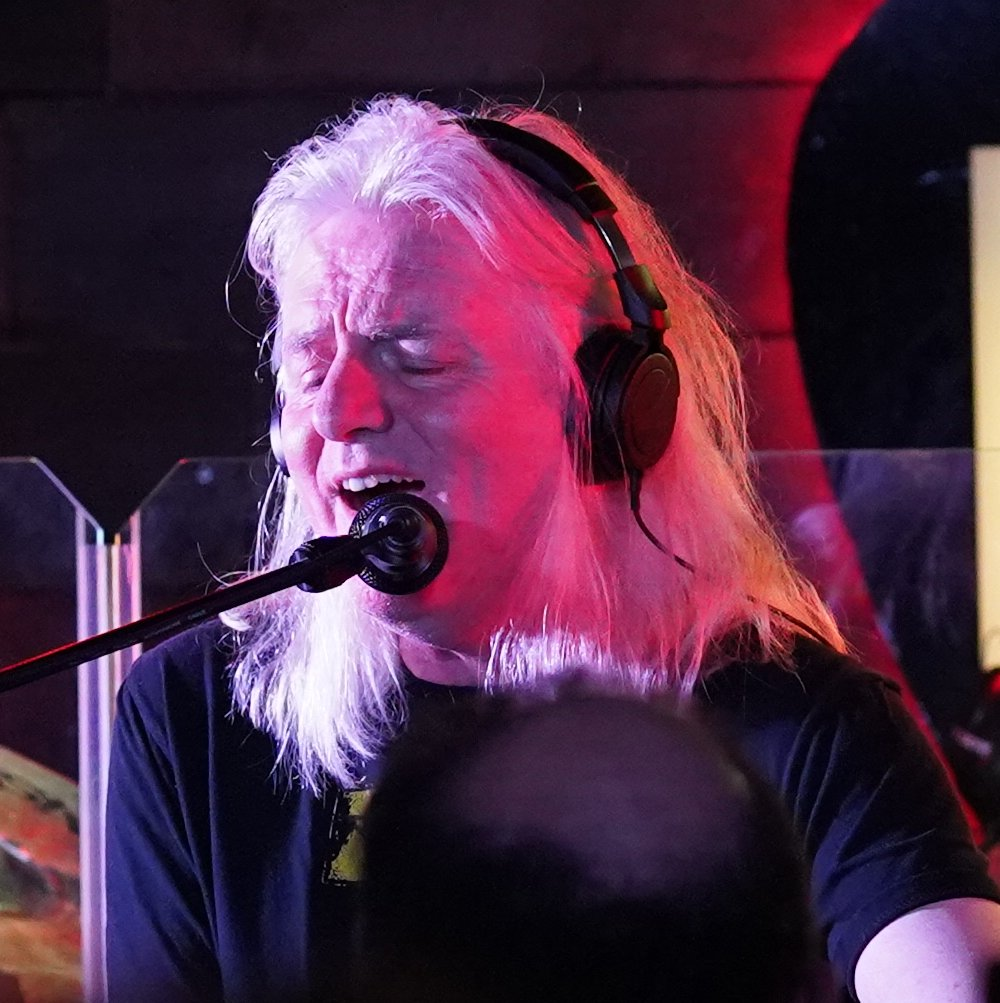
- Young with Lifesigns in 2023

Background information
- Born: A. Smith; 31 May 1956 (age 70); Liverpool, England
- Genres: Progressive rock, rock, jazz fusion, pop
- Occupations: Musician, singer-songwriter
- Instruments: Vocals, keyboards
- Years active: 1974–present
- Label: Lifesigns Music Limited
- Member of: Lifesigns
- Formerly of: John Young Band, Scorpions, Greenslade, Asia, The Law, Qango

John Young performance at "Baltic Progressive festival".

John Young (born 31 May 1956) is a British rock musician hailing from Liverpool. He is currently the keyboardist and singer for the progressive rock band Lifesigns.

== Biography ==
Young spent his early years at the Liverpool Metropolitan Cathedral where he was classically trained on piano and vocals. His first bands were mainly semi-pro jazz rock bands, and he played in these into the mid 1980s.

His first major break came in 1985 when he auditioned and became part of Uli Jon Roth's Band (ex-Scorpions).

After a world tour, Young did studio and session work with artists including Steeleye Span and Bon Jovi. He formed a band with Jon Camp (Renaissance) which signed to Warner Bros, but failed to produce any material before the project was disbanded.

Young went on to play with the MTV band in London; during this time he met John Wetton, who asked him to join Asia for two European tours.

Shortly after that he joined Paul Rodgers and Kenney Jones in a very short lived band called The Law. They played a single show at the Bowl in Milton Keynes with Bryan Adams and ZZ Top.

Young joined Bonnie Tyler in the mid 1990s and has worked with her live band ever since.

In 2000, he's worked with another short lived band called Qango including John Wetton on bass and vocals, Dave Kilminster on guitars and back-up vocals and Carl Palmer on drums, as a spin off from Asia. They published a live album, Live in the Hood later that year, consisting of material from Asia and Palmer's previous band ELP and one original song The last one home.

In 2001, Young joined the Scorpions for a world tour of their album Acoustica.

2001 saw him co-writing the Fish album Fellini Days with John Wesley and also appearing on the resulting live album Fellini Nights.

John Young has also worked as part of the re-generated Greenslade appearing on the albums Large Afternoon and Live 2001.

He also toured with John Wetton, appearing on several live albums with the singer/bass player, Live in Tokyo 1997, An evening With John Wetton in 2002 on which he appears on one song. He was also a part of the band for the live 2002 album, Live at the John Wetton Fan Convention also featuring Geoff Downes on keyboards, John Mitchell on guitars and back up vocals, Steve Christey on drums as well as John Wetton on bass and lead vocals.

In 2002, Young formed his own band, The John Young Band following the release of the albums Life Underground and Significance.

Young has worked with Jon Anderson of Yes. The first product of that union saw Jon Anderson touring Europe and playing the song "Sooner (Than Later)", a track co-penned with Young.

Young has worked as keyboard player with The Strawbs on their November/December 2010 Canada/UK tour, alongside Dave Cousins, Dave Lambert, Chas Cronk, and Tony Fernandez.

A small number of John Young Band gigs took place at the end of 2012 and during 2013.

Young also completed an album of instrumental music, "Financial Meltdown", which continues the series of albums in the vein of "Political Agenda" and "Scientific Breakthrough". Music from this album is often used on various TV productions.

Young also plans to re-release his solo album "Significance" in the very near future.

=== Lifesigns ===
In recent years John Young has been working with Nick Beggs (Steven Wilson Band), Frosty Beedle (Cutting Crew) and Steve Rispin (Sound Engineer for Asia) on a new prog rock orientated project called "Lifesigns", which signed to Esoteric Records in a one-album deal. The Lifesigns album was released in early 2013. As well as the core band members, Lifesigns also features guest contributions from Steve Hackett (Genesis), Jakko Jakszyk (Jakszyk Fripp & Collins, King Crimson), Thijs van Leer (Focus), Robin Boult (Howard Jones, Fish). Lifesigns began performing live in 2014. This version includes Jon Poole (ex-Cardiacs) on bass/vocals and Niko Tsonev (ex-Steven Wilson band) on guitar/vocals.

The album has five tracks: "Lighthouse", "Telephone", "Fridge Full of Stars", "At the End of the World" and "Carousel".

A live DVD "Under the Bridge – Live in London," culled from two performances at Stamford Bridge in January 2015 was released in October 2015.

Work on the second studio release was announced via the PledgeMusic crowd funding website in 2015 with the following message.

"It's still hard to believe how far the band has come in a few short years, from local pubs to playing to nearly 50,000 people over the summer. Supporting Marillion in Germany through to festivals at Lorelei, Ramblin Man and Cropredy. A great deal of this is thanks to you our friends and supporters and the wonderful PledgeMusic. We have little or no press and radio so word of mouth is everything. Cardington will be the next stage in our growth. Cardington is the title track but this is not a concept CD just a concept track about some Sheds in Bedfordshire! We think those of you who joined with us in funding the live DVD/CD package (Under the Bridge) will know our commitment to quality. The music Lifesigns creates is both progressive and popular. It can be complex or simple but hopefully always melodic and uplifting. Thank you for all the Telephone boxes.... we look forward to the Airships."

Within 48hrs the full target had been met and the writing and recording process began in earnest.

In August 2016, Niko Tsonev announced that he was leaving the band to concentrate on other projects including "Moonparticle"

Cardington was released in late summer 2017 and consists of seven tracks: "N", "Voice In My Head", "Chasing Rainbows", "Different", "Impossible", "Touch", "Cardington".

As with the first album the core band members were augmented by guest musicians including: Dave Bainbridge (Iona, Celestial Fire, Strawbs), Robin Boult, Menno Gootjes (Focus) and Niko Tsonev (Steven Wilson, Moonparticle).

To date the album has met with very favourable reviews, both from fans and critics alike, including a review and article in Prog Magazine.

Dave Bainbridge was confirmed as the replacement for Niko Tsonev for live dates in the summer of 2017, including a short UK Tour, Progdreams VII and Cruise To The Edge. He will bring a new perspective to the live sound with both his guitar, additional keyboards and a touch of bouzouki thrown in for good measure.

== Current band members ==
=== Lifesigns' current members ===
- John Young – Lead vocals, keyboards
- Jon Poole – bass, backing vocals
- Dave Bainbridge – guitars, keyboards, backing vocals
- Zoltan Csorsz – drums
- Steve Rispin – FOH engineer (Asia, Yes)

=== Former members ===
- Frosty Beedle – drums, backing vocals
- Niko Tsonev – guitars
- Nick Beggs – bass

John Young Band members have included the following:

- Robin Boult – guitars (Howard Jones, Fish)
- Ian Salmon – bass, backing vocals (Arena)
- Dave Stewart – drums (Deacon Blue, Fish, Albert Hammond)
- John Jowitt – bass, backing vocals (IQ)
- Steve Vantsis – bass, backing vocals (Fish, TILT)
