= Open skies (disambiguation) =

Open skies refers to various aviation laws jointly called "freedoms of the air".

It may also refer to:

== Entertainment ==
- Fliers of the Open Skies, 1977 Croatian film directed by Marijan Arhanić
- Open Skies, Closed Minds, 1999 book on UFOs by Nick Pope
- Rip Open the Skies, 2006 album by the Christian rock band Remedy Drive
- Open Skies (song), 2008 Reamonn song

== Aviation policy ==
- ASEAN Open Skies, aviation policy
- EU–US Open Skies Agreement, 2008 EU-US aviation pact
- Treaty on Open Skies, 2002

== Other uses ==
- OpenSkies, British Airways subsidiary airline
- OC-135B Open Skies, reconnaissance aircraft utilized by the U.S. Air Force

== See also ==
- Open Sky (disambiguation)
