= Beyond These Shores =

Studio album by Iona
- Released: 1993; November 3, 2003 (remastered rerelease)
- Recorded: June to October, 1993
- Studio: The Cutting Rooms, Manchester
- Genre: Progressive rock, Celtic rock, Christian rock
- Length: 68:26
- Label: What Records, label of Word Records
- Producer: Dave Bainbridge

Iona chronology
The Book Of Kells (1992)	Beyond These Shores (00000000)	Journey Into The Morn (1996)

Alternative cover
- Rerelease cover

Professional ratings
Review scores
Source	Rating
Allmusic	link

Beyond These Shores is a progressive rock album by Iona, released in 1993. Beyond These Shores is largely based on the story of St. Brendan's voyage. Brendan and a company of monks sailed from Ireland in a leather and wood boat in the sixth century to 'the promised land' which many believe to be America.

This time the majority of the recording was at:

- The Cutting Rooms, Manchester - (Engineer Nigel Palmer)

with only additional work done at

- Moles Studio, Bath
- St. Anne's Church, Manchester - (recording of the Piano)

The recording was remastered for the 2002 release The River Flows: Anthology and later re-released on Open Sky Records as a standalone album.

== Credits ==
=== Band ===
- Joanne Hogg - Vocals, Acoustic Guitar, Keyboards
- Dave Bainbridge - Guitars, Piano, Keyboards
- Nick Beggs - Chapman Stick, Bass guitars, Ashbury Bass
- Terl Bryant - Drums, Percussion
- Mike Haughton - Saxophone, Flute, Whistle, Recorder, Vocals

=== Additional Musicians and Special Guests ===
- Robert Fripp - Guitars, Frippertronics
- Frank Van Essen - Violin (on Machrie Moor)
- Peter Whitfield - Violins, Viola
- Troy Donockley - Uilleann pipes, Low Whistles, E-Bow Guitar
- Fiona Davidson - Celtic Harp
- Debbie Bainbridge (Dave's wife) - Oboe
- String Ensemble
  - Francis Cummings - Violin
  - Mansell Morgan - Violin
  - Richard Williamson - Viola
  - Anna Frazer - Cello
  - Christopher Hoyle - Cello
  - Rebecca Whettan - Cello

== Track listing ==
All track composed by Iona except where noted

- Disc - Total Time – 68:26
1. "Prayer on the Mountain" – 2:53
2. "Treasure" – 4:26
3. "Brendan's Voyage (Navigatio)" – 4:13
4. "Edge of the World" – 4:47
5. "Today" – 3:14
6. "View of the Islands" – 2:30
7. "Bird of Heaven" – 9:11
8. "Murlough Bay" – 4:11
9. "Burning Like Fire" – 4:57
10. "Adrift" – 3:48
11. "Beachy Head" – 5:46
12. "Machrie Moor" (Fiona Davidson) – 4:34
13. "Healing" (Davidson) – 4:47
14. "Brendan's Return" – 4:16
15. "Beyond These Shores" – 4:53

== Release details ==
- 1993, UK, What Records WHAR 1300, Release Date ? ? 1993, LP
- 1993, UK, What Records WHAD 1300, Release Date ? ? 1993, CD
- 1993, UK, What Records WHAC 1300, Release Date ? ? 1993, Cassette
- 1993, USA, Forefront Records FFD-3014, Release Date ? ? 1993, CD
- 2003, UK, Open Sky Records OPENVP3CD, Release Date 3 November 2003, CD
