= Iona (album) =

Studio album by Iona
- Released: June 1990
- Recorded: March 1990
- Genre: Progressive rock, Celtic rock, Christian rock
- Length: 55:28
- Label: What?
- Producer: Dave Bainbridge

Iona chronology
Iona (1990)	The Book of Kells (1992)

Professional ratings
Review scores
Source	Rating
AllMusic	3/5 stars

Iona is a progressive rock album by Iona, released in 1990. This was the debut album from this group which progressed throughout occasional live appearances and an occasional appearance on record.

The recording process moved from place to place making good use of a number of studio facilities, including:

- Studio 3, Leeds – (Engineer Steve Lea, Assisted by Rob Price)
- Wildlife Studio, Ipswich – (Engineer Nigel Palmer)
- The Field, Derbyshire – (Engineer Neil Costello)
- Square One, Lancashire – (Engineer Steve Boyce-Buckley, Second Engineer Cliff Hewitt)
- Cavalier Studio, Stockport – (Engineer John Harrison)

The recording was remastered for the 2002 release The River Flows: Anthology and later re-released on Open Sky Records as a standalone album.

== Track listing ==
1. Turning Tide – 1:25 *
2. Flight of the Wild Goose – 6:00 *
3. The Island – 5:10 *
4. White Sands – 3:35
5. Dancing on the Wall – 4:32 *
6. A'mmachair – 5:29 *
7. Vision of Naran – 5:49 *
8. Beijing – 5:16
9. Iona – 3:43 *
10. Trilogy – 8:35 *
11. Here I Stand – 2:35
12. Columcille – 3:19

"*" indicates a track re-recorded for re-release in the Box Set and individual 2003 reissue. Times are for the original 1990 release.

== Personnel ==
Iona

- Joanne Hogg – Vocals, Guitar, Keyboards
- Dave Bainbridge – Guitars, Piano, Keyboards, Tambourine
- Dave Fitzgerald – Saxophones, Flute, Piccolo, Chinese Flutes, Flageolet, Recorder, Irish whistle

Additional musicians

- Terl Bryant – Drums, Percussion
- Tim Hines – Percussion
- Tim Harries – Electric Bass, Double Bass
- Troy Donockley – Uilleann pipes
- Peter Whitfield – Violin, Viola
- Ian Thomas – Voice on Columcille

== Release history ==
- 1990, UK, What Records WHAR 1266, Release Date ? June 1990, LP
- 1990, UK, What Records WHAD 1266, Release Date ? June 1990, CD
- 1990, UK, What Records WHAC 1266, Release Date ? June 1990, Cassette
- 1990, US, Forefront Records FFD-2700, Release Date ? June 1990, CD
- 2003, UK, Open Sky Records OPENVP1CD, Release Date 3 November 2003, CD
