= Lifesigns (band) =

English progressive rock band

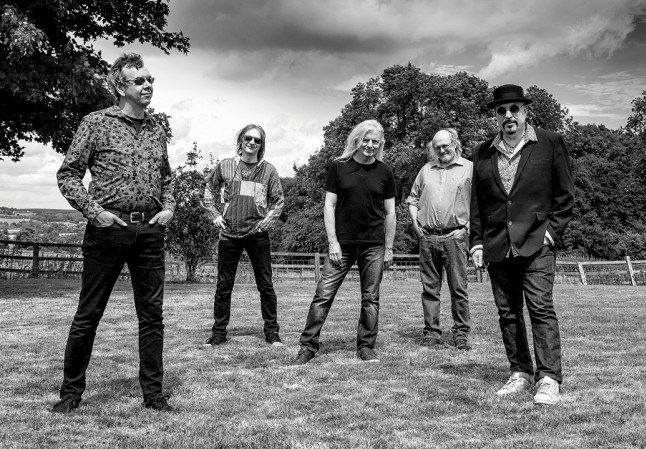
- Lifesigns in 2017

Background information
- Genre: Progressive rock
- Years active: 2008–present
- Members: John Young; Steve Rispin; Jon Poole; Dave Bainbridge; Frank van Essen
- Past members: Frosty Beedle; Nick Beggs; Niko Tsonev; Zoltán Csörsz
- Website: lifesignsmusic.co.uk

Lifesigns are an English progressive rock band, first conceived by lead singer and keys player John Young in 2008. By 2014, the band's lineup included Steve Rispin as their sound engineer, Jon Poole on bass and vocals, Martin "Frosty" Beedle on drums, percussion and vocals, and formerly Niko Tsonev on guitars and vocals. After Tsonev departed the band in 2016, Dave Bainbridge joined on guitar and additional keys. Beedle left the band in 2020 and was replaced by Zoltán Csörsz. In late April 2025, John Young announced that they would be touring as a 3-piece for the Summer Tour, since Zoltán's domestic commitments mean that he is unable to continue as a member of the band.

The band are noted for their keyboard-driven melodic prog rock sound and pop rock influences. Lifesigns released their self-titled debut studio album in 2013. Their third and latest studio album, Altitude, was released in 2021.

== History ==
Lifesigns was conceived in 2008 by John Young. Working together with sound engineer Steve Rispin, John started to lay the grounds for the Lifesigns album in 2008. In 2010, John was joined by longtime friend Nick Beggs on bass, Chapman Stick and background vocals, and by drummer Martin "Frosty" Beedle to complete the first lineup of the band.

The band worked for over two years to complete their self-titled debut album, with notable guest stars such as progressive rock legend Steve Hackett (Genesis), Jakko Jakszyk (King Crimson), Thijs Van Leer (from Focus) on flute, and Robin Boult (from Fish) on guitar. "Lifesigns" was released on 5 February 2013.

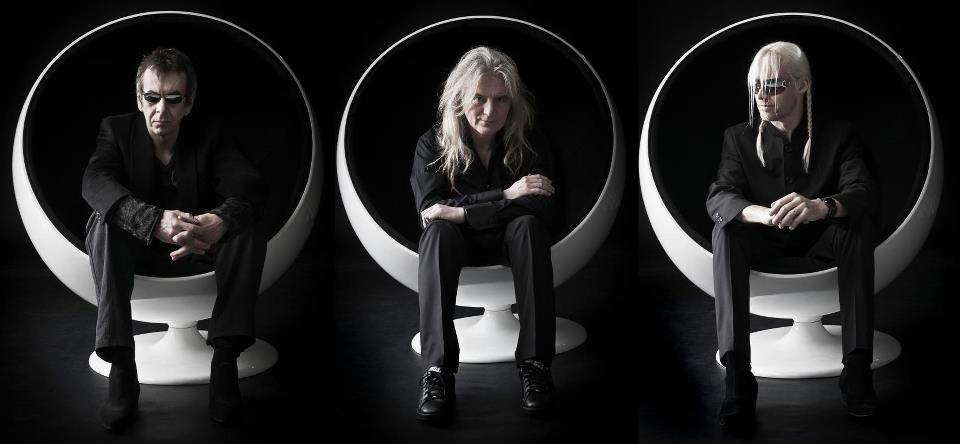
Promotional photo at the time of debut. From left: Martin "Frosty" Beadle, John Young, Nick Beggs

The band began live performances in 2014. As Nick Beggs was busy with other musical endeavors (notably touring with Steve Hackett), Jon Poole was recruited to handle bass and vocals, while Niko Tsonev (departed the band August 2016) took up the guitar duties. The band performed on the progressive "Cruise to the Edge" in the Spring of 2014, as well as appearances in England and continental Europe. In addition to the entire Lifesigns debut, other songs performed included material from the John Young Band, as well as new material.

In October 2015, Lifesigns released a live DVD titled Under the Bridge - Live in London, filmed at a venue beneath the Stamford Bridge stadium, over two nights in January of the same year. The project was crowdfunded via PledgeMusic.

In September 2017, Lifesigns released their second studio album, Cardington. The Prog Report described it as "a specific and customized alcove of prog that does not sound quite like anything else". It features recordings of "Different", "Impossible", and "Voice in My Head", and four new tracks. Cardington features guitarist Dave Bainbridge who subsequently joined the band's live lineup in June 2017. It was their second crowdfunded project, and they met their funding target within 48 hours of launching the campaign. The album reached no. 20 on the Independent Albums Chart and no. 76 on the Physical Albums Chart in the UK.

2018 has seen the band perform several live dates throughout the U.K., with further live dates in March/April 2019 on the Cruise to the Edge and in Europe.

On 15 January 2020, the band released a 4-track digital EP titled Lifesigns Music, featuring one track from each of their previous releases. A radio edit of "Impossible", which previously featured on Cardington, was released as a single with an accompanying music video.

On 9 June 2020 Frosty Beedle announced his departure from the band. Zoltán Csörsz (Flower Kings, Karmakanic) was announced as his replacement on 12 June 2020.

In 2021, Lifesigns released their third studio album, Altitude. It was produced during the COVID-19 pandemic and received financial support via an independent crowdfunding campaign. The album was first made available as a download, and a CD release followed on 8 March 2021. The band will embark on a European tour later in 2023, with a live album and a new studio album expected to follow. Live in the Netherlands was later announced for release on 3 July, featuring audio recorded in August 2022 at the Poppodium Boerderij in Zoetermeer.

On 21 April 2025, John Young posted on Facebook to announce that due to pressing domestic commitments in Sweden, Zoltán Csörsz is no longer remaining with the group, and that for the Autumn 2025 Tour, Lifesigns will be performing as a live 3-piece (with drum track).

== Members ==
Current members

- John Young – keyboards, lead vocals (2008–present)
- Steve Rispin – sound engineer, production (2008–present)
- Jon Poole – bass guitar, vocals (2014–present)
- Dave Bainbridge – guitar, keyboards (2016–present)
- Frank van Essen – drums, violin (2025-present)

Guests

- Simon Phillips – drums, percussion (Guest on Cruise To The Edge 2024)
- Chris Mack - drums, percussion (Two North America tours 2024/5)

Former members

- Frosty Beedle – drums, percussion, vocals (2010–2020)
- Nick Beggs – bass guitar, Chapman Stick, vocals (2010–2013)
- Niko Tsonev – guitar, vocals (2014–2016)
- Zoltán Csörsz – drums, percussion (2020–2025)

== Discography ==
=== Studio ===
- Lifesigns (2013)
- Cardington (2017)
- Altitude (2021)

=== Live ===
- Under the Bridge - Live in London (2015 DVD / 2CD)
- Live in the Netherlands (2023)

=== Compilation ===
- Anthology (2026)

== Gallery ==
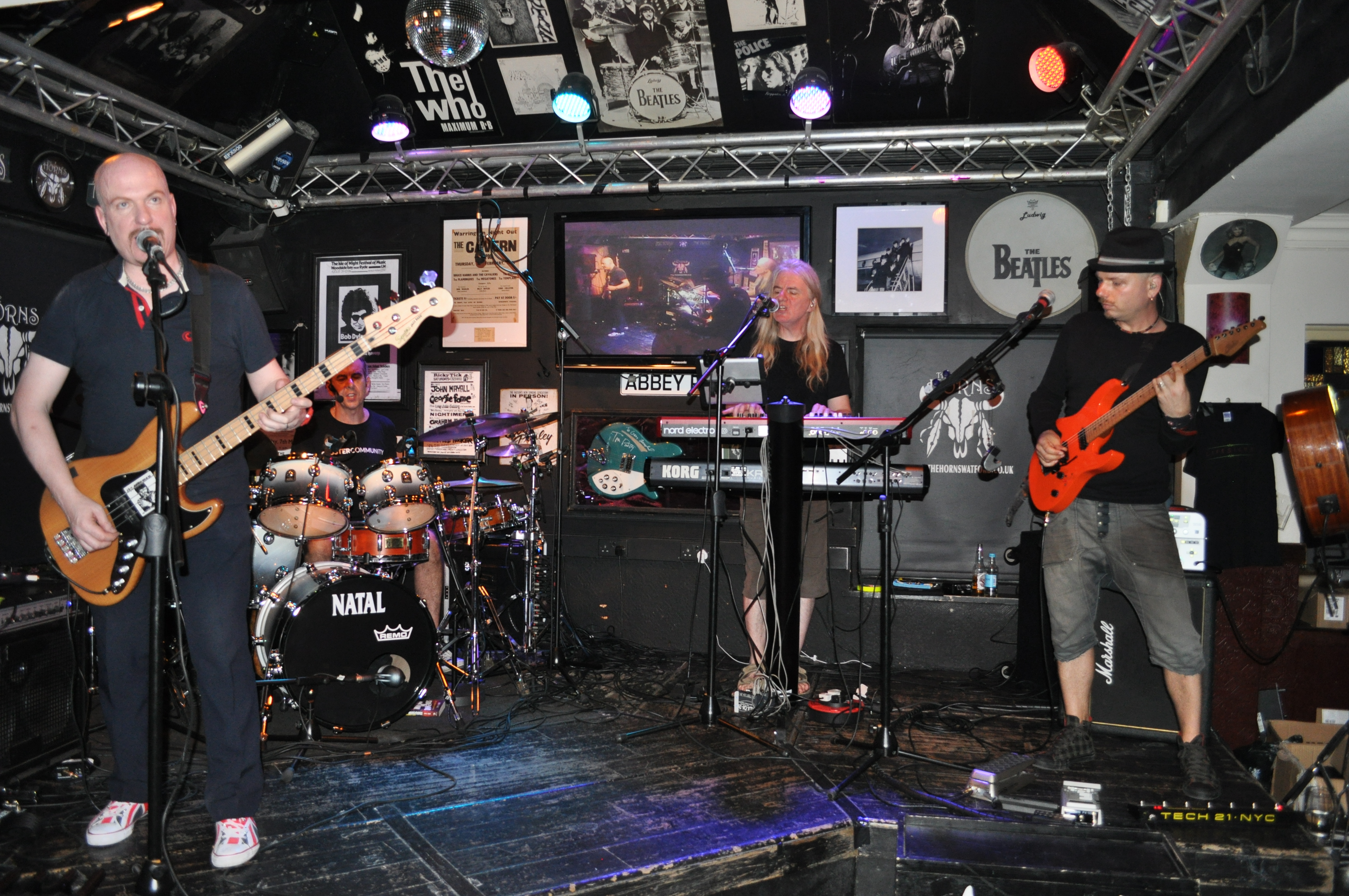
Lifesigns at 'The Horns' Watford in July 2014

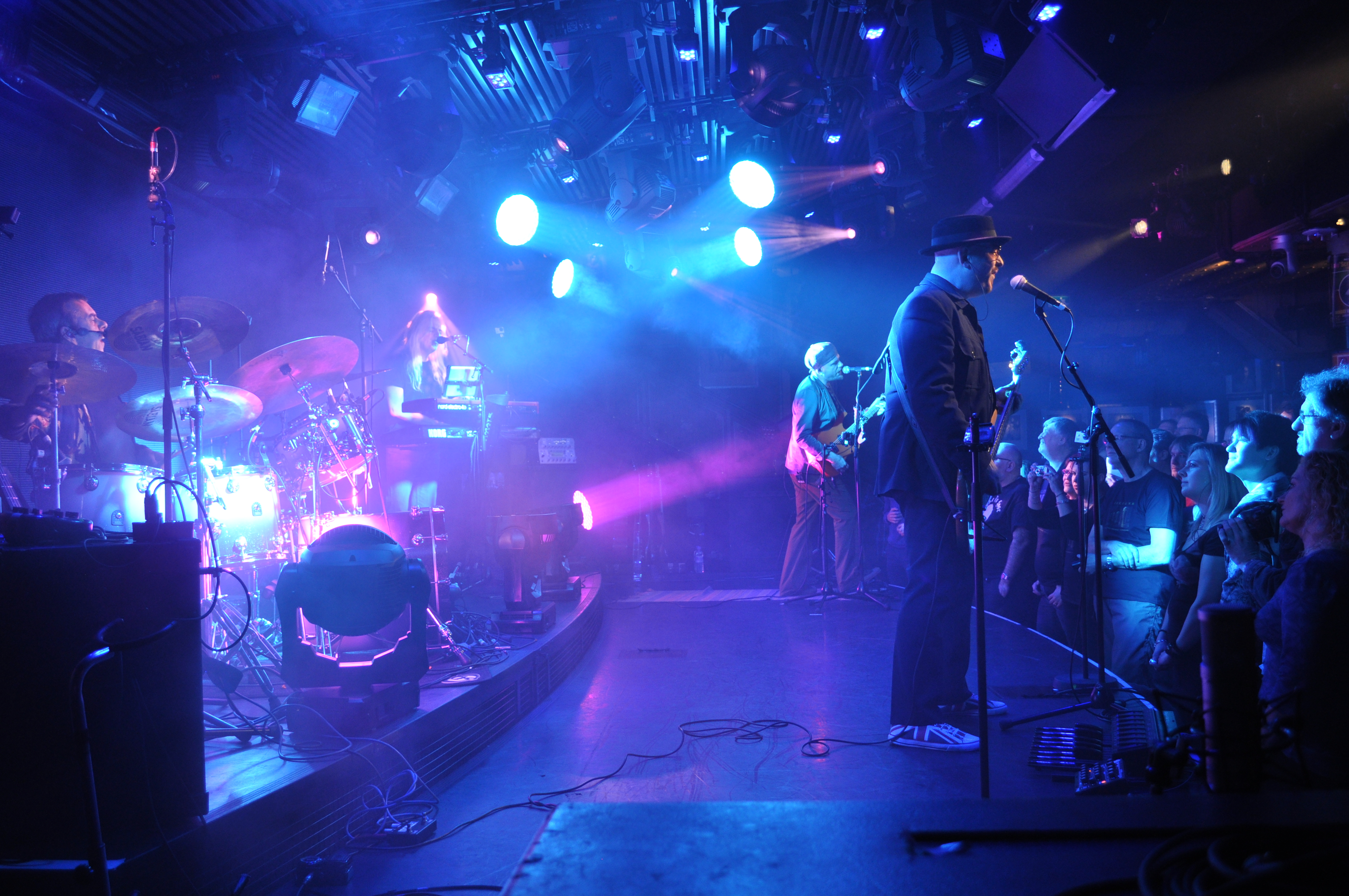
Lifesigns at 'Under The Bridge' in January 2015

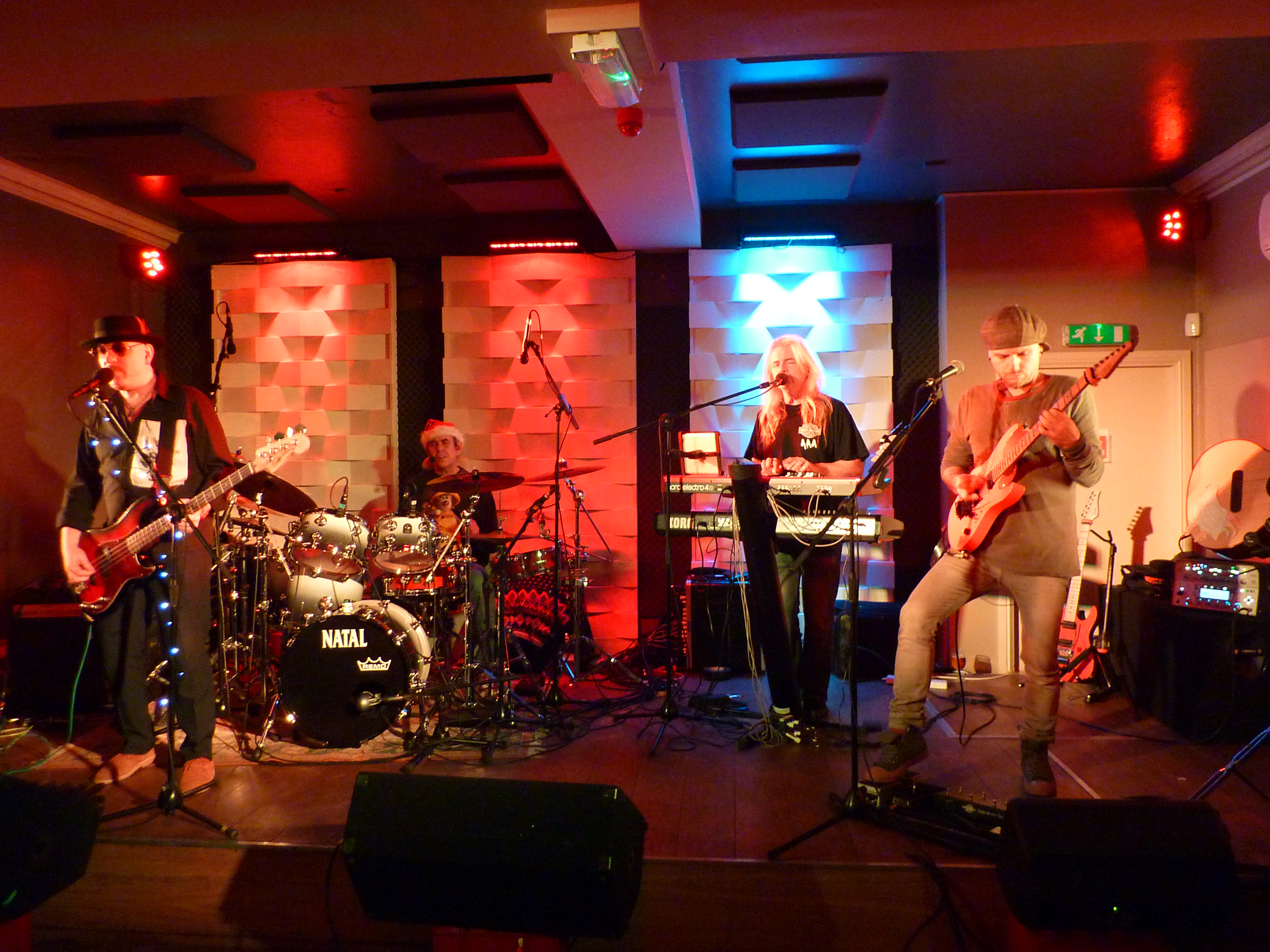
Lifesigns at 'The Portland Arms' Cambridge in December 2014
