= Open Sky =

Studio album by Iona
- Released: 8 May 2000
- Recorded: 2000
- Genre: Progressive rock, Celtic rock, Christian rock
- Length: 73:30
- Label: Alliance; Open Sky re-release 2005
- Producer: Dave Bainbridge

Iona chronology
Woven Cord (1999)	Open Sky (2000)	The River Flows (2002)

Professional ratings
Review scores
Source	Rating
AllMusic	4/5 stars

Open Sky is a progressive rock album by Iona, released in 2000.

== Recording ==
Recordings were made at various locations during 1999 and 2000, all engineered by Nigel Palmer:

- Chapel Studios, Lincolnshire
- Visions on Albion, Yorkshire
- The Snooker Roon, Northern Ireland

== Track listing ==
Disc 1 – total time 73:30

1. "Woven Cord" – 9:28
2. "Wave After Wave" – 6:15
3. "Open Sky" – 5:40
4. "Castlerigg" – 9:27
5. "A Million Stars" – 3:20
6. "Light Reflected" – 5:11
7. "Hinba" – 4:58
8. "Songs of Ascent" (part 1) – 7:58
9. "Songs of Ascent" (part 2) – 9:06
10. "Songs of Ascent" (part 3) – 4:53
11. "Friendship's Door" – 7:14

== Personnel ==
=== Band ===
- Joanne Hogg – vocals, piano, keyboards
- Dave Bainbridge – guitars, keyboards, e-bow and Indian guitars, piano, bouzouki, autoharp, vocals
- Phil Barker – bass guitar
- Frank Van Essen – drums, percussion, violins, vocals
- Troy Donockley – Uilleann pipes, low whistles, tin whistle, vocals, acoustic guitar, e-bow guitar, Portuguese mandola, harmonium

=== Additional musician and special guest ===
- Billy Jackson – Celtic harp, clarsach

== Release details ==
- 2000, UK, Alliance Records ALD 1901772, release date 8 May 2000, CD
- 2000, US, Forefront Records FFD-5285, release date 8 May 2000, CD
- 2005, UK, Open Sky Records OPENVP8CD, release date 27 June 2005, CD
