= The Bad Shepherds =

English folk band starring Adrian Edmondson and Troy Donockley

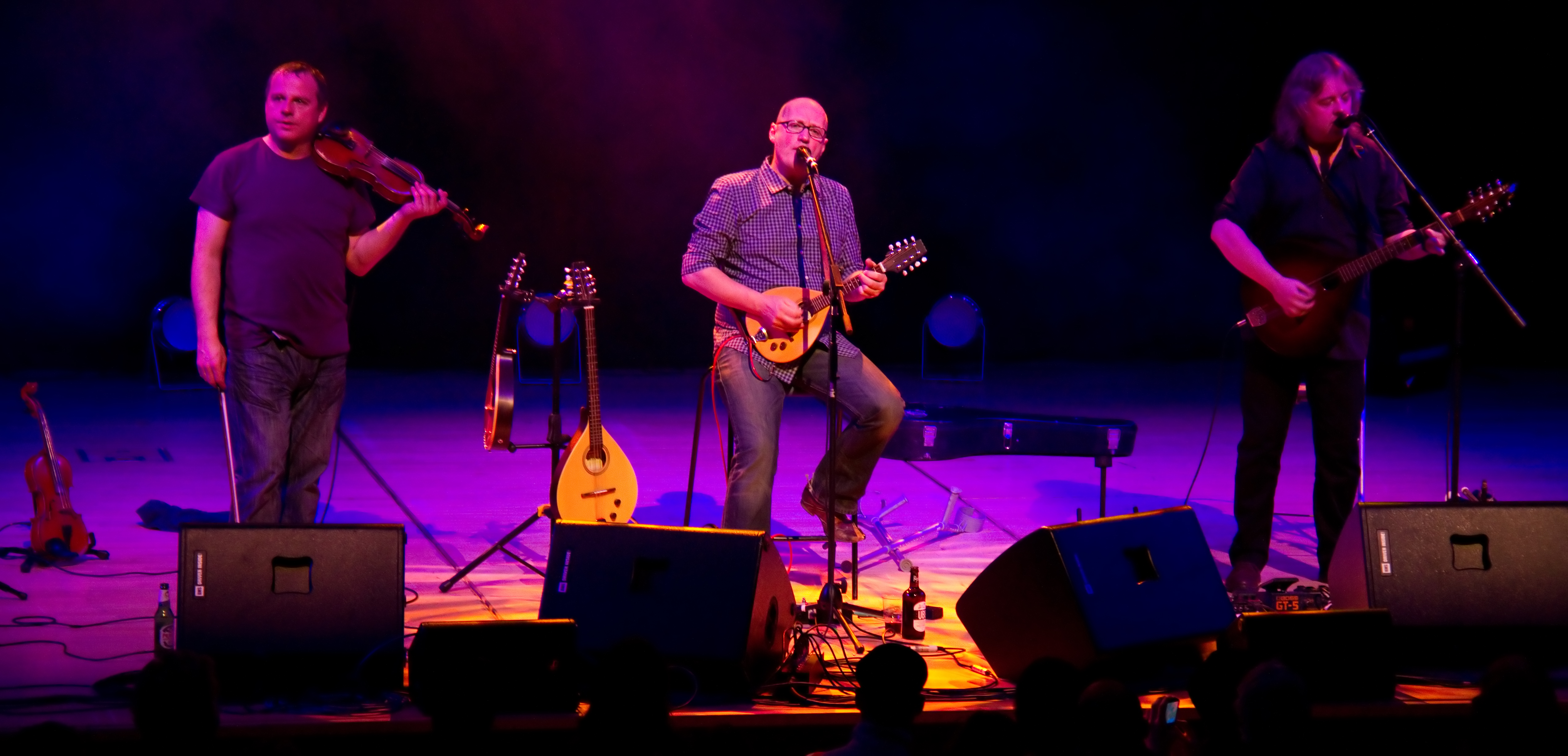
- The Bad Shepherds performing at Birmingham Town Hall in 2011

Background information
- Genres: Folk punk
- Years active: 2008–2016
- Label: Monsoon Music
- Past members: Adrian Edmondson; Troy Donockley; Tim Harries; Terl Bryant; Andy Dinan; Carol Dawson; Eimear Bradley; Keith Angel; Mark Woolley; Martin Allcock; Brad Lang
- Website: thebadshepherds.com

The Bad Shepherds were an English folk punk band, formed by the comedian Adrian Edmondson in 2008. They played folk punk songs with traditional folk instruments. The band primarily consisted of Edmondson (vocals, mandolins, mandola) and Troy Donockley (uilleann pipes, cittern, whistles, vocals).

== History ==
After "accidentally" buying a mandolin, Edmondson taught himself to play a few chords and he began to play a few punk songs on it. After playing for two days with Donockley, a virtuoso uilleann pipes player and multi-instrumentalist, they had arranged eight songs. After some initial experimentation, they enlisted Dinan, winner of the All-Ireland Fiddle Championship, and the band was formed. Essentially a folk band, the band's repertoire is taken from punk and new wave hits from 1978 to 1985. They reinterpret songs, inserting traditional reels and jigs.

After touring the United Kingdom during 2008, the Bad Shepherds released their debut album, Yan, Tyan, Tethera, Methera! (which translates from an ancient Cumbrian dialect as One, Two, Three, Four!) in May 2009. The band released their second album, By Hook or By Crook, with former Steeleye Span member Tim Harries playing double bass, in 2010. The Bad Shepherds also headlined the first Looe Music Festival in 2011.

At the start of 2013, after a year long hiatus the band announced they were getting back together to release a new album and undertake a 24-date UK tour, along with a six-date tour of Australia. Both of which were entitled Mud, Blood and Beer. The album was released on 19 August 2013, and included both cover versions of punk and new wave tracks, plus their own material.

Adrian Edmondson announced the band's end on his Facebook page on 31 October 2016.

Allcock died on 16 September 2018, aged 61.

== Awards ==
The Bad Shepherds were nominated for the Best Live Act award at the 2010 BBC Radio 2 Folk Awards.

In 2012, the band won the Spiral Earth Award for best live act. The organisation celebrates a wide range of music, however their roots are mainly focused in the folk music genre.

== Band members ==
=== Final line-up ===
- Adrian Edmondson – vocals, mandolin, mandola
- Troy Donockley – uilleann pipes, cittern, whistles, vocals

=== Former ===
- Terl Bryant – percussion
- Andy Dinan – fiddle
- Carol Dawson – fiddle
- Eimear Bradley – fiddle
- Keith Angel – percussion
- Mark Woolley – percussion
- Maartin Allcock – bass
- Brad Lang – bass
- Tim Harries – bass

== Discography ==
Year	Album details	Track listing
2009	Yan, Tyan, Tethera, Methera!: Released: May 2009; Label: Monsoon Music; Formats: CD, download	1. "I Fought the Law"/"Cockers at Pockers"; 2. "Down in the Tube Station at Midnight"; 3. "Rise"; 4. "Whole Wide World"/"Hag With the Money"; 5. "The Model"; 6. "Humours of Tullah"/"Teenage Kicks"/"Whisky in the Jar"/"The Merry Blacksmith"; 7. "Once in a Lifetime"/"Pinch of Snuff"; 8. "London Calling"/"Manchester Calling"; 9. "Up the Junction"; 10. "Yan, Tyan, Tethera, Methera" ("Fraher's Jig"/"Coppers & Brass"/"The Old Bush"/"Rip the Calico"); 11. "God Save the Queen"/"Mountain Road"
2010	By Hook or By Crook: Released: 15 November 2010; Label: Monsoon Music; Formats: CD	1. "Anarchy in the U.K."; 2. "The Sound of the Suburbs"; 3. "Making Plans For Nigel"; 4. "Friday Night, Saturday Morning"; 5. "Ramones Medley"; 6. "Panic"; 7. "Ace of Spades"; 8. "Ever Fallen in Love (With Someone You Shouldn't've)"; 9. "White Riot"
2013	Mud, Blood and Beer': Released: 19 August 2013; Label: Monsoon Music; Formats: CD, download	1. "Our House"; 2. "No More Heroes"; 3. "The Lunatics Have Taken over the Asylum"; 4. "Going Underground"; 5. "What a Waste"; 6. "Gary Gilmore's Eyes"; 7. "Shipbuilding"; 8. "Road to Nowhere"; 9. "Mud, Blood & Beer"; 10. "Off to the Beer Tent"
