= Ballads and Candles =

Studio album by Maddy Prior
- Released: 2000
- Recorded: 1999–2000
- Length: 67:00
- Label: Park

Ballads and Candles is an album by Maddy Prior.

Professional ratings
Review scores
Source	Rating
AllMusic	3/5 stars

It was recorded from concert performances during a tour of Cambridge, London and Warwick in 1999/2000 and released on CD in 2000.

The songs are drawn from all of Maddy's career. June Tabor joins in for three songs from Silly_Sisters: "Singing The Travels" (including an extra verse not in the previous recording), "My Husband's Got No Courage In Him", and "Doffing Mistress." Maddy sings one song about her daughter Rose, and another about her son Alex. There is also a DVD of the same performances, which includes song introductions not on the CD version. "Sing, Sing All Earth" is a song that Maddy had not previously recorded, sung a cappella by the entire ensemble.

== Track listing ==
1. The Blacksmith (Trad)
2. Blood and Gold (song/trad) / Mohacs (tune/Dan Ar Bras)
3. Boar's Head (Trad)
4. A Virgin Most Pure (Unknown)
5. All In The Morning (Trad)
6. Sing, Sing All Earth (Trad - Copper Family)
7. Doffing Mistress (Trad)
8. Betsy Bell and Mary Gray (Trad)
9. Hind Horn (Trad)
10. Singing The Travels (Trad)
11. Long Shadows (Maddy Prior)
12. The King (Trad)
13. Rose (Maddy Prior)
14. Mother and Child (Maddy Prior)
15. Alex (Maddy Prior)
16. My Husband's Got No Courage In Him (Trad)
17. Blackleg Miner (Trad)
18. Padstow May Song (Trad)

== Personnel ==
- Maddy Prior - vocals
- June Tabor - vocals
- Rose Kemp - vocals
- Steve Banks - percussion
- Troy Donockley - guitar, uilleann pipes, low and tin whistle, cittern, vocals
- Nick Holland - keyboards, vocals
- Rick Kemp - bass, vocals
- Peter Knight - violin
