= OpenSky service =

OpenSky was a service provided by Gizmo5, which is now out of business, to enable communication between users of SIP (Internet standard RFC 3261) and users of Skype (which uses a proprietary protocol).

Early solutions to communication between the two classes of user typically required installation of a gateway.

OpenSky – the first freely available hosted SIP to Skype gateway service – commenced on 9 February 2009.

In March 2009 Skype announced a beta of Skype For SIP, a comparable service for business users.

On 30 July 2009 Digium, Inc. announced the opening of Skype for Asterisk Public Beta (prior to the open phase, from 25 September 2008, Skype for Asterisk Beta was apparently non-open). The download was available until 7 August 2009 and scheduled to expire on 30 August 2009.
