= Etarlis =

Studio album by Mermaid Kiss
- Released: 2007
- Genre: Progressive rock Symphonic rock
- Label: Independent

Mermaid Kiss chronology
Salt on Skin (2006)	Etarlis (2007)	Another Country (2012)

Etarlis is the second full-length studio album by the British progressive rock band Mermaid Kiss. It is a concept album that tells the story of a journey of two friends, Anna and Gerri, and their adventures in the fantasy land of Etarlis.

== Track listing ==
1. "Prelude" - 2:11
2. "A Different Sky" - 5:18
3. "Walking with Ghosts" - 4:00
4. "Dark Cover" - 4:37
5. "Nowhere to Hide" - 7:08
6. "Siren Song" - 3:14
7. "A Sea Change" - 7:20
  1. "The Lighthouse"
  2. "The Running Tide"
  3. "In Deep"
  4. "Slide and Sway"
  5. "In Deep" (Reprise)
8. "Shadow Girl" - 4:04
9. "Beat the Drum" - 6:35
10. "Crayola Skies" - 5:36
11. "The City of Clouds (Qway-Lin)" - 10:30

== Line-up ==
=== Band members ===
- Evelyn Downing - lead and harmony vocals, flute
- Jamie Field - acoustic guitars, occasional electric guitar & backing vocals
- Andrew Garman - keyboards, bass, drums, percussion
- Nigel Hooton - lead and rhythm electric and acoustic guitars

=== Session musicians ===
- Kate Belcher - lead & harmony vocals on ‘Nowhere To Hide’, ‘Siren Song’ and ‘Shadow Girl’.
- Wendy Marks - cor anglais, oboe, recorders

=== Guests ===
- Troy Donockley (Iona)
- Jonathan Edwards (Panic Room & ex-Karnataka)
