= ASEAN Single Aviation Market =

ASEAN member states

ASEAN Single Aviation Market (ASEAN-SAM) also known as ASEAN Open Sky Agreement/Policy, is the region's major aviation policy. It is geared towards the development of a unified and single aviation market among ASEAN members in Southeast Asia projected to begin 1 January 2015, though all agreements have not been signed. The aviation policy was proposed by the ASEAN Air Transport Working Group, supported by the ASEAN Senior Transport Officials Meeting, and endorsed by ASEAN Transport Ministers. The creation of the ASEAN-SAM was a key component of the road map for the establishment of the ASEAN Economic Community.

The ASEAN-SAM is expected to fully liberalize air travel between member states in the ASEAN region, allowing ASEAN countries and airlines operating in the region to directly benefit from the growth in air travel around the world, and also freeing up tourism, trade, investment, and service flows between member states. Since 1 December 2008, restrictions on the third and fourth freedoms of the air between capital cities of member states for air passengers services have been removed, while from 1 January 2009, full liberalization of air freight services in the region took effect. On 1 January 2011, full liberalization on fifth freedom traffic rights between all capital cities took effect.

The ASEAN single aviation market policy will supersede existing unilateral, bilateral and multilateral air services agreements among member states which are inconsistent with its provisions.

The plan was for all carriers from ASEAN to enjoy unlimited third, fourth and fifth freedom operations within the region. However, after deadline was passed in early 2016, three ASEAN members—the Philippines, Indonesia and Laos—reluctant to ratify the full agreement. Currently, Indonesia remains opposed to opening up its secondary cities, the Philippines has excluded Manila from the agreement and Laos has yet to free up Luang Prabang and the national capital Vientiane.
