= Troy Donockley =

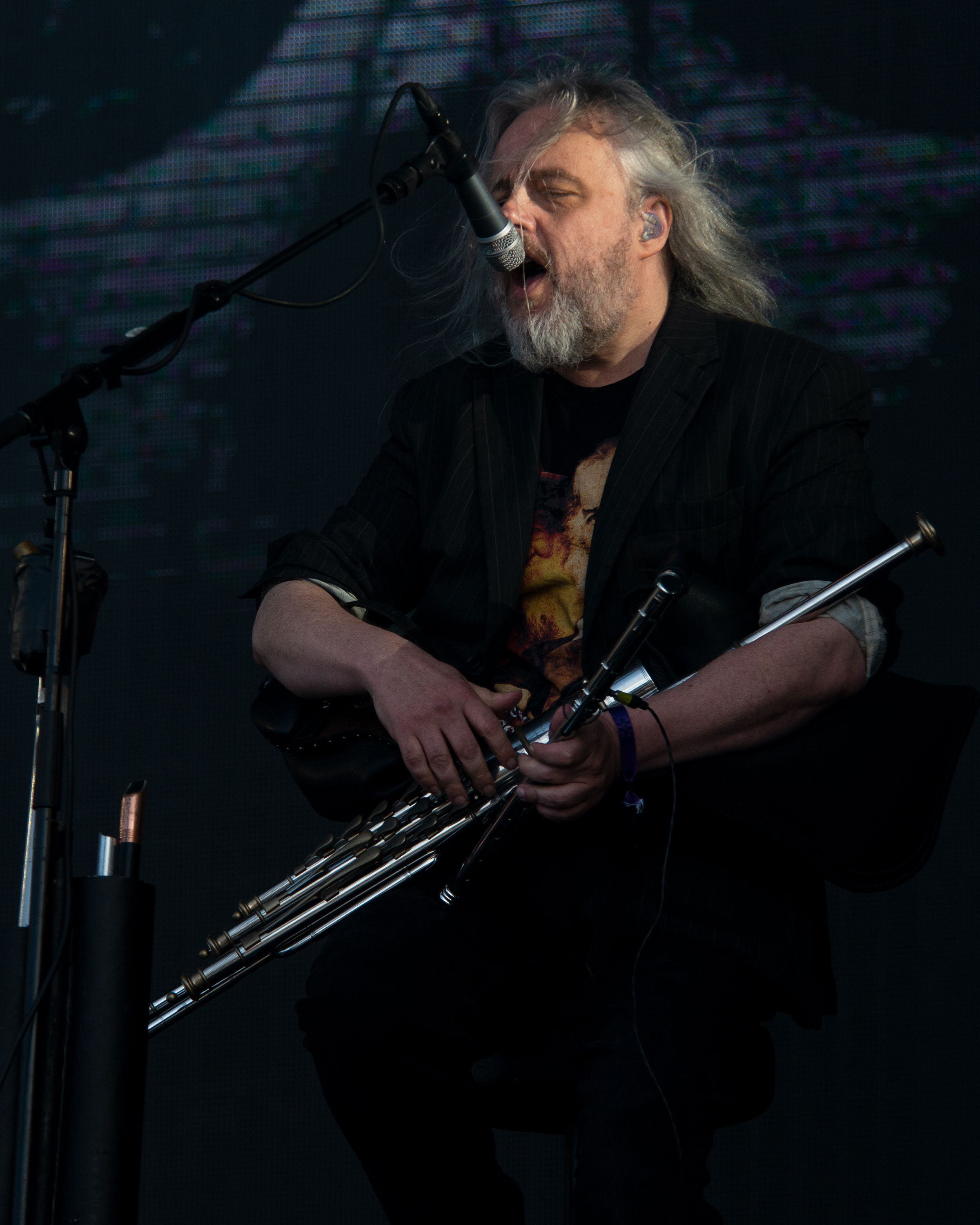
- Donockley with Nightwish in 2022

Background information
- Born: 30 May 1964 (age 61); Workington, Cumberland, England
- Genres: Folk rock; traditional; progressive rock; symphonic metal
- Occupation: Musician
- Instruments: Uilleann pipes; vocals; guitar; tin whistle; keyboards; bass; bouzouki; cittern; bodhrán; mandola
- Years active: 1980–present
- Member of: Nightwish; Auri
- Formerly of: Iona; The Bad Shepherds
- Website: www.troydonockley.com

Troy Donockley (born 30 May 1964) is an English composer and multi-instrumentalist most known for his playing of Uilleann pipes. Having performed with many artists as a session player, he is most notable as a member of Finnish symphonic metal band Nightwish, with whom he has performed since 2007 and joined as a full-time member in 2013.

== Early life and career ==
Donockley was born in Workington, Cumberland; his parents were members of a band called Travelling Country. At the age of 16, Troy joined them, playing at many venues in West Cumbria. His father's record collection was broad and gave his son a love of classical, rock, country as well as traditional music. He is a multi-instrumentalist and a master of the Uilleann pipes. His ambition as a teenager was to travel the world as a musician, but he hated "empty pop created by cynical twerps". The strangeness of the sound of the Uilleann pipes enabled him to become a session musician with prog-rockers The Enid in 1987 on their album 'The Seed and the Sower'.

== Celtic-folk music ==
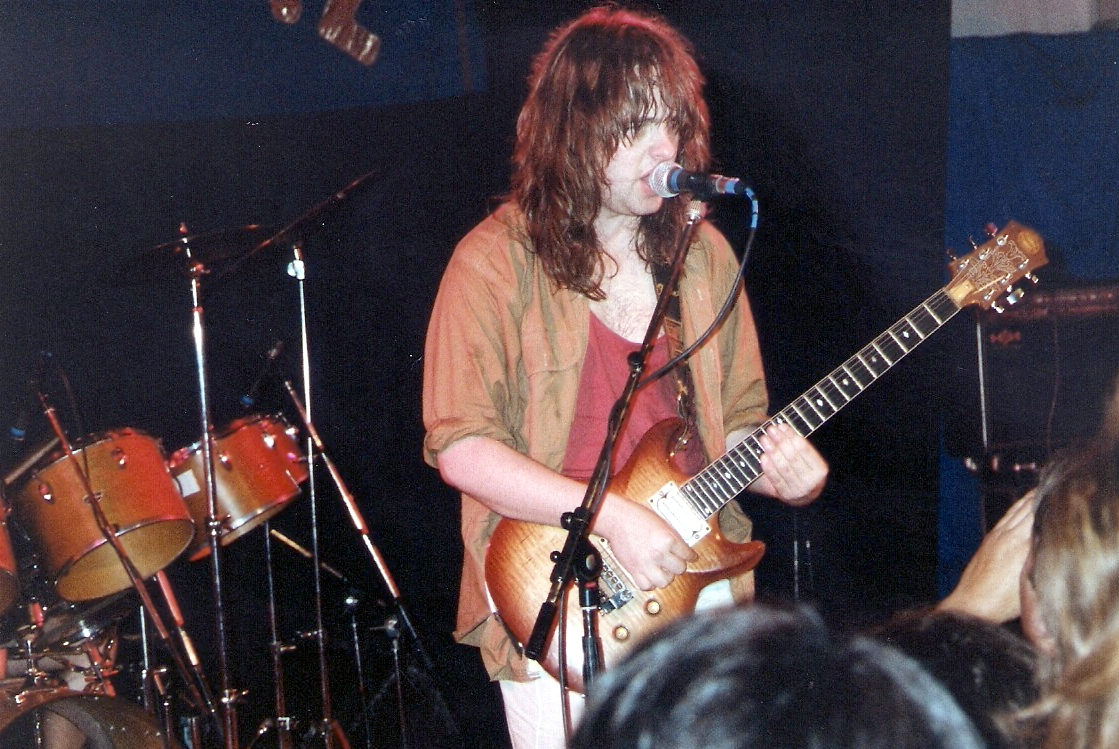
Donockley on guitar with You Slosh in 1991

In 1987, he formed Celtic Rock band 'You Slosh', recording 'Glorious Racket' with them in 1989. In the following year, he recorded as a session musician with Celtic-folk band Iona. This was at the very beginning of the boom in Celtic-folk bands, and both ventures were very successful. Donockley recorded one more album with You Slosh in 1991, plus nine more albums with Iona. He became an official member of the group in 1995 and left the band in 2009. Máire Brennan, a member of the Celtic-folk group Clannad, called on Donockley to be a session musician on 'Two Horizons'. In 1999, Donockley recorded 'Our Kate' on the album 'Debatable Lands' by Kathryn Tickell, contrasting two types of pipes with her; she plays the Northumbrian smallpipes.

Together with Adrian Edmondson, Donockley founded the band The Bad Shepherds in 2008, performing punk and new wave classics on folk instruments.

== Maddy Prior and Barbara Dickson ==
Both Barbara Dickson and Maddy Prior lived in the north of England and Donockley met them both. Alongside her easy listening albums, Dickson also recorded folk albums. In 1994, and again in 2004, Donockley was a session musician for Dickson's folk albums and then went on to produce several of her albums including Words Unspoken (2010) and To Each & Everyone - The Songs of Gerry Rafferty (2013).

After recording Flesh and Blood with Prior in 1997, Donockley also became co-producer of her next four solo albums including Ravenchild (1999) and Ballads and Candles (2000).

== Nightwish ==
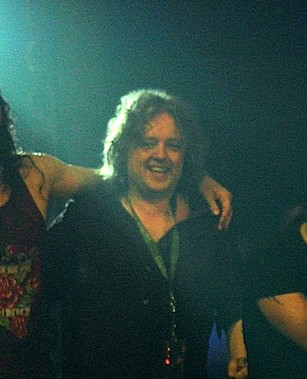
Donockley with Nightwish in 2007

Donockley's first appearance with Nightwish was on their 2007 release, Dark Passion Play, as a guest musician, providing some whistles and pipes to the songs "The Islander", "Last of the Wilds", and "Meadows of Heaven". He also joined them on select shows of the subsequent tour and appeared in the music video for "The Islander". In 2011, Donockley appeared as a guest on Imaginaerum, providing whistles, pipes, and vocals. He joined Nightwish again on the Imaginaerum World Tour, and also appeared on the band's concert DVD 'Showtime, Storytime'. He also appears in the Imaginaerum film from 2012 as a stage illusionist.

Following the conclusion of the Imaginaerum World Tour, Donockley was made a full-time member of Nightwish in October 2013. He plays various instruments within the band, including the pipes and whistles, as well as bouzouki and electric and acoustic guitars.

He provides the main vocals for Nightwish's single ‘Harvest’, released in 2020, one of only two songs on the album Human. :II: Nature. not to feature frontwoman Floor Jansen on lead vocals.

== Session work ==
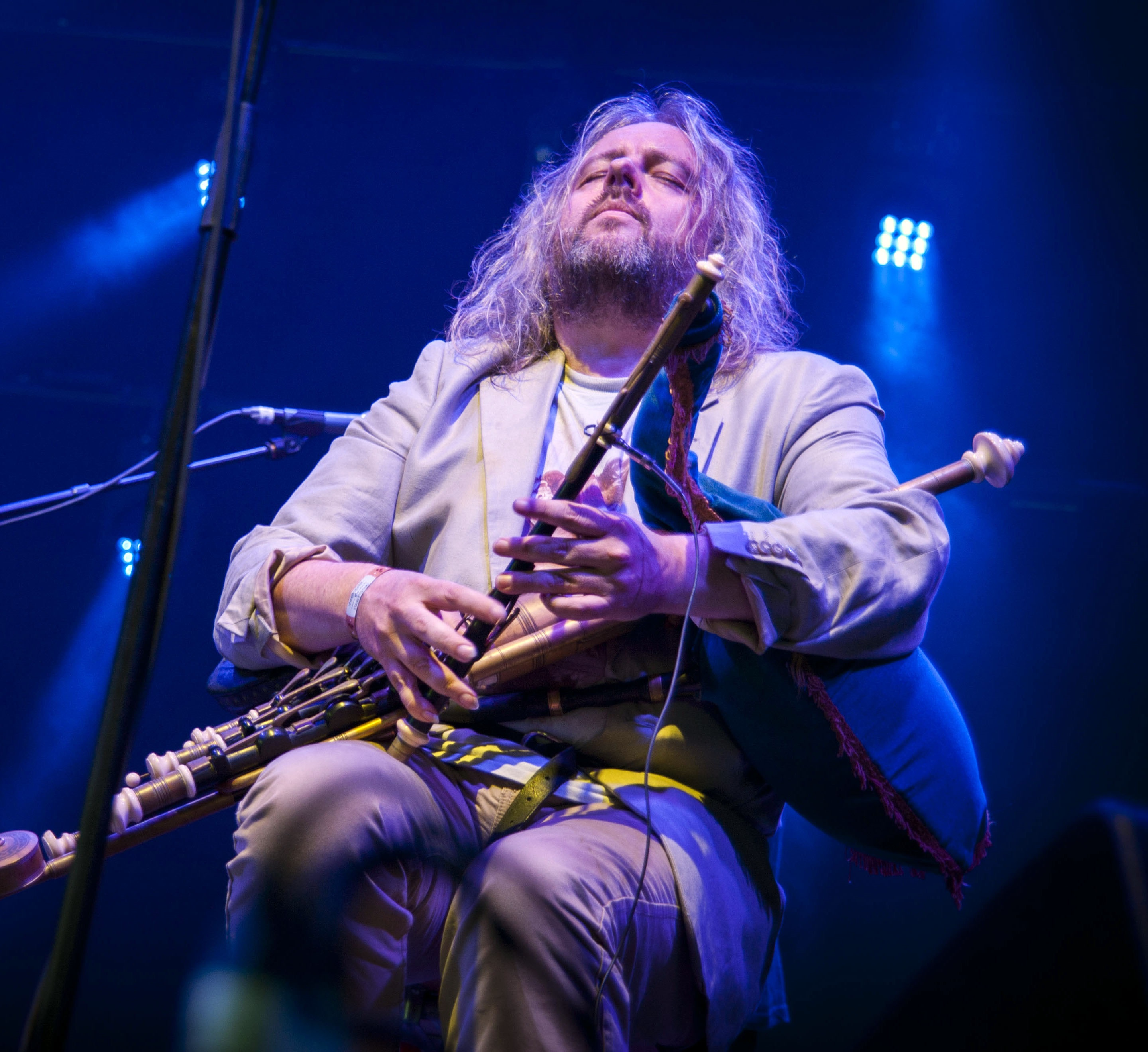
Donockley with The Bad Shepherds in 2014

Donockley has recorded as a session musician with Roy Harper, Midge Ure, Del Amitri, Alan Stivell, Status Quo, and Leah. Bruce Johnston of the Beach Boys has used him. Eight studio albums by prog-rockers Mostly Autumn feature him, as do Welsh prog group Magenta on two albums. He also performed on Etarlis, a 2007 release by Mermaid Kiss. He can be heard on recent movie soundtracks Robin Hood (Ridley Scott, 2010) and Ironclad (Jonathan English, 2011). Notably, he also performed at the Scottish leg of Live 8 with Midge Ure.

== Classical work ==
Donockley has composed music for choir and orchestra. He has gone to great lengths to find the right kind of studio production. The Unseen Stream (1998) and The Pursuit of Illusion (2003) put the uilleann pipes in a sound mix that had never been heard before. His latest classical work is The Madness of Crowds (2009).

== Personal life ==
Donockley lives with his wife Terri and daughter Mia in North Yorkshire, England. He is a vegan.

== Discography ==
Studio albums:

- The Unseen Stream (1998)
- The Pursuit of Illusion (2003)
- The Madness of Crowds (2009)

=== Nightwish ===
Studio albums:

- Dark Passion Play (2007)
- Imaginaerum (2011)
- Endless Forms Most Beautiful (2015)
- Human. :II: Nature. (2020)
- Yesterwynde (2024)

Soundtrack album:

- Imaginaerum: The Score (2012)

Live albums:

- Showtime, Storytime Live DVD (2013)
- Vehicle of Spirit Live DVD (2016)
- Decades: Live in Buenos Aires Live DVD (2019)

=== Barbara Dickson ===
- Full Circle (2004)
- Time and Tide (2008)
- Words Unspoken (2011)
- To Each & Everyone - The Songs of Gerry Rafferty (2013)

=== The Bad Shepherds ===
Studio albums:

- Yan, Tyan, Tethera, Methera! (2009)
- By Hook or By Crook (2010)
- Mud Blood & Beer (2013)

=== Iona ===
Studio albums:

- Iona (1990) - as guest
- The Book of Kells (1992) - as guest
- Beyond These Shores (1993) - as guest
- Journey into the Morn (1996)
- Open Sky (2000)
- Dunes/Snowdonia (2002)
- The Circling Hour (2006)

=== Dave Bainbridge ===
Studio albums:

- When Worlds Collide (2005)
- From Silence (2005)

=== Maddy Prior ===
Studio albums:

- Flesh and Blood (1997)
- Ravenchild (1999)
- Ballads and Candles (2000)
- Arthur The King (2001)
- Lionheart (2003)

=== Midge Ure ===
Studio album:

- Duet (2006)

=== You Slosh ===
Studio albums

- Glorious Racket (1989)
- Lift Me Up (1991)

=== Auri ===
Studio albums:

- Auri (2018)
- II – Those We Don't Speak Of (2021)
- III – Candles & Beginnings (2025)
