= Iona (band) =

Celtic rock band

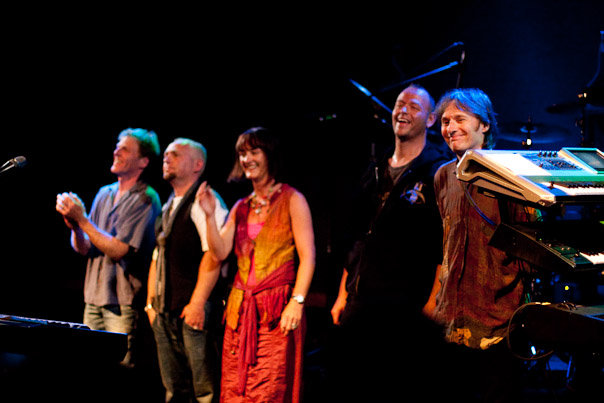
- Iona during a 2010 concert.

Background information
- Origin: United Kingdom
- Genres: Celtic rock; progressive rock
- Years active: 1990–2016
- Labels: What, Word, Open Sky
- Past members: Joanne Hogg; Dave Bainbridge; Frank van Essen; Phil Barker; Martin Nolan; Dave Fitzgerald; Nick Beggs; Terl Bryant; Fiona Davidson; Peter Whitfield; Tim Harries; Mike Haughton; Troy Donockley
- Website: iona.uk.com

Iona was a Celtic Christian rock band from the United Kingdom. It was formed in the late 1980s by lead vocalist Joanne Hogg and multi-instrumentalists David Fitzgerald and Dave Bainbridge. Troy Donockley joined later, playing the uilleann pipes, low whistles, and other instruments.

== History ==
When Iona released their first self-titled album in 1990, drummer Terl Bryant, bassist Nick Beggs (formerly the bassist of Kajagoogoo), Fiona Davidson on Celtic harp, Peter Whitfield on strings, Troy Donockley on Uilleann pipes, and percussionist Frank van Essen had joined the band. The first album Iona is mostly about the history of the island of Iona, from which the band got its name.

Iona returned in 1992 with The Book of Kells, a concept album with several tracks based on pages from the eponymous book. Terl Bryant took over on drums and percussion for the album after the Frank van Essen left. Fitzgerald left that year to pursue a degree in music.

Beyond These Shores, the band's third album, was released in 1993 and included guest musician Robert Fripp. The album was loosely based on the legendary voyage of St. Brendan to the Americas before Christopher Columbus; the band did not intend for it to be viewed strictly as a "concept album".

Journey into the Morn was released in 1995, a more accessible and rock-oriented album loosely based on the hymn "Be Thou My Vision". It is sung in Gaelic at the beginning of the album and again near the end. Máire Brennan, the lead singer of Celtic and new-age band Clannad, was brought in to help Hogg with the Gaelic pronunciation; Brennan also sang backup vocals.

Two live albums followed in the late 1990s: the double-disc Heaven's Bright Sun and Woven Cord, which was performed with the All Souls Orchestra. Between these two albums Teri Bryant departed, and Frank van Essen returned, playing drums as well as violin. Frank van Essen is featured on the band's 2000 album, Open Sky.

After being released from their U.S. contract with ForeFront Records and their U.K. contract with Alliance Records, Iona formed Open Sky Records to release material independently. The first new release on the label was the 2002 box set The River Flows, which featured their then-out-of-print first three albums (all remastered and several first album tracks were even re-recorded), as well as a fourth disc of unreleased tracks and rarities called Dunes. The first three albums have since been re-released individually with new cover art.

Next the group was in semi-hiatus for nearly a decade. A two-disc live DVD Iona: Live in London was released in April 2006. It features a 5.1 Dolby Digital Surround mix by John Kellogg, who is from Los Angeles. In November 2006 came the release of a new studio album: The Circling Hour.

In June 2009 Troy Donockley announced that he was leaving Iona. A message on his website said: "I have had a wonderful time with my friends in Iona and am very, very proud of the albums we made together. But, as in all life, things change. After extended periods of no activity we have found ourselves with a very different musical and philosophical direction. We have parted as great friends should, with a sad-happiness and I wish the band all the very best wishes for the future".

Donockley went on to become a member of punk and folk band The Bad Shepherds; he has played in Barbara Dickson's band for a number of years and is the band's musical director as well as playing with Finnish symphonic metal band Nightwish, with whom he has made many guest appearances both live and on their albums over recent years, before joining them as a full-time member in October 2013. He has been replaced in Iona by piper and woodwind player Martin Nolan.

In June 2010, Iona went to the United States for their first tour there in nine years. On 19 June 2010, they played a very well received concert at NEARfest, a progressive rock festival in Bethlehem, Pennsylvania; during the show they introduced new songs for an album, Another Realm, which was released in 2011 and is their final album. After several concerts throughout the U.S. and one in Canada, they ended the tour at Cornerstone Festival, a Christian music festival in Illinois, on 30 June.

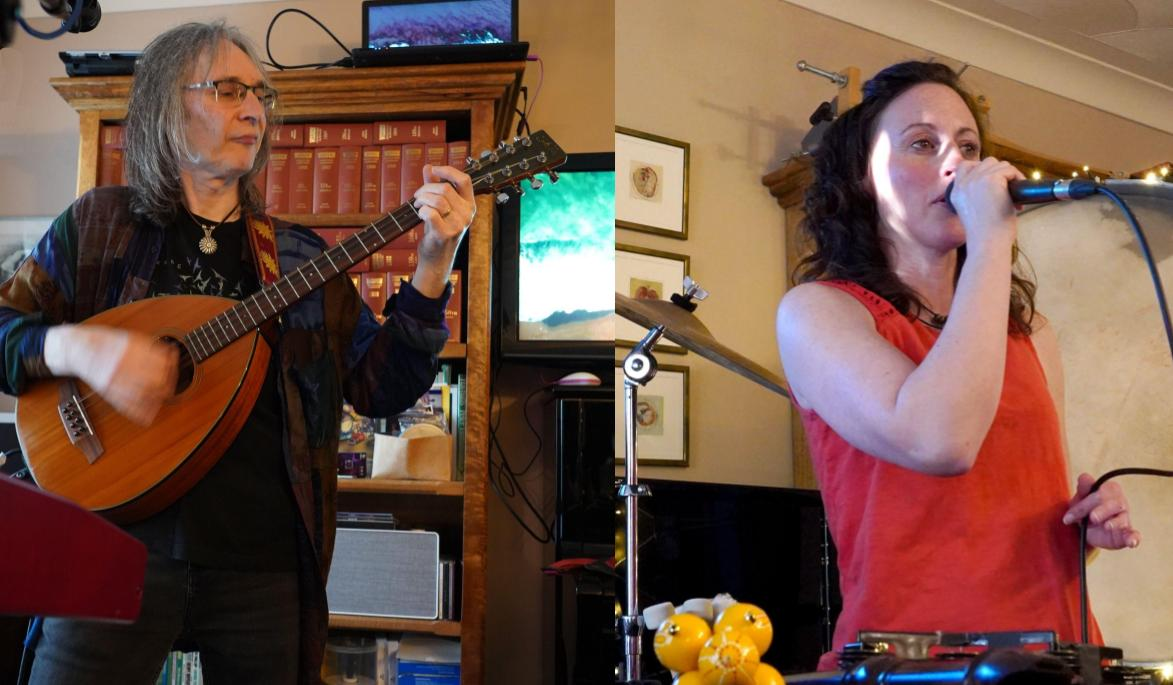
Bainbridge performing Iona music with Sally Minear in 2024

On 11 December 2016, the band announced on its Facebook page that it was suspending recording and touring as a group, citing other commitments. "We do not know what will happen in future years, whether we will get together again as Iona," the band said. "The door will remain open, but for the foreseeable future, the next and exciting chapters of our journey will involve other avenues."

In March 2024, Bainbridge announced that he would join with Sally Minnear to perform Iona music as a duo on a UK tour in July. Minnear, Bainbridge's bandmate in Celestial Fire, had been a singer in Lord of the Dance, and has sung backing vocals for Lifesigns.

== Members ==
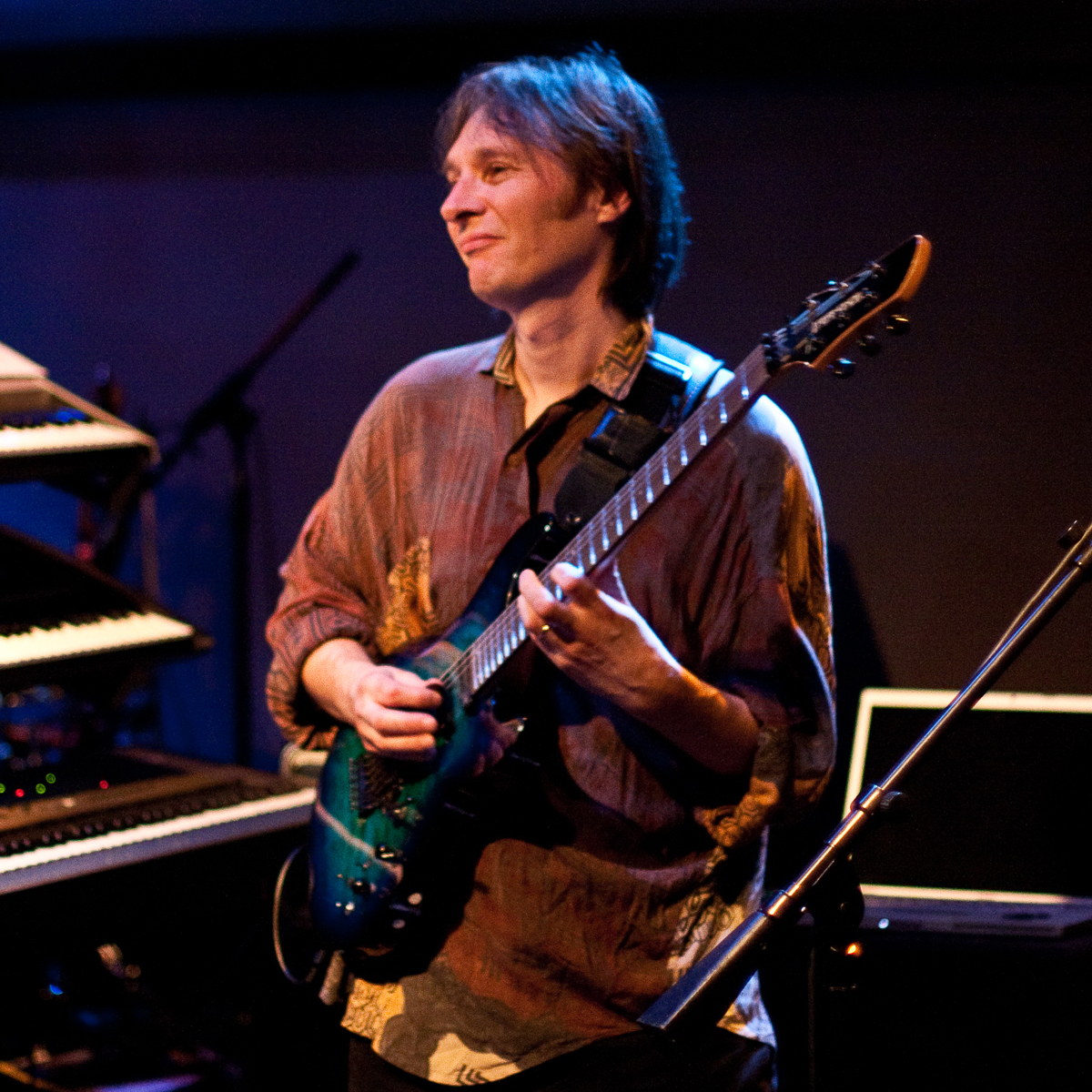
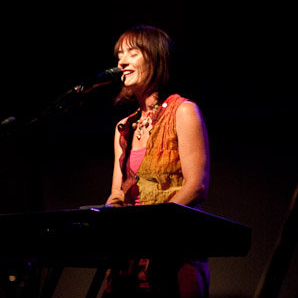
Mainstays Dave Bainbridge and Joanne Hogg performing with Iona in 2010

=== First incarnation ===
- Joanne Hogg – lead vocals, keyboards
- David Fitzgerald – saxophones, flutes, recorder, tin whistle
- Dave Bainbridge – keyboards, electric guitar

=== First album ===
- Joanne Hogg – lead vocals, keyboards
- David Fitzgerald – saxophones, flutes, recorder, tin whistle
- Dave Bainbridge – keyboards, electric guitar
- Terl Bryant – drums
- Tim Harries – bass
- Troy Donockley – pipes, whistles, flutes
- Peter Whitfield – strings

=== Final members ===
- Joanne Hogg – lead vocals, keyboards, acoustic guitar
- Dave Bainbridge – lead guitar, keyboards
- Martin Nolan – pipes, whistles, flutes
- Phil Barker – bass
- Frank van Essen – drums, percussion, violin

== Discography ==
=== Studio recordings ===
- Iona (1990)
- The Book of Kells (1992)
- Beyond These Shores (1993)
- Journey into the Morn (1996)
- Open Sky (2000)
- Dunes/Snowdonia (2002)
- The Circling Hour (2006)
- Another Realm (2011)

=== Live recordings ===
- Heaven's Bright Sun (1997)
- Woven Cord (1999 – featuring the All Souls Orchestra)
- Live in London (2008)
- Edge of the World: Live in Europe (2013)

=== Collection ===
- Treasures (or The Very Best Treasures) (1996)

=== Box sets ===
- The River Flows: Anthology (2002 – four-CD box-set)
- The Book of Iona (2020 – seventeen-CD box-set)
- The Iona Vinyl box set (2026 – ten-disc vinyl box-set)

=== Other collaborations ===
- Various Artists – Songs for Luca (2003)
- Various Artists – Songs for Luca 2 (2007)

== Videography ==
- Iona, DVD (2004) very early live concert
- Live in London, DVD (2006)
