= Dave Bainbridge =

English keyboardist and guitarist (born 1959)

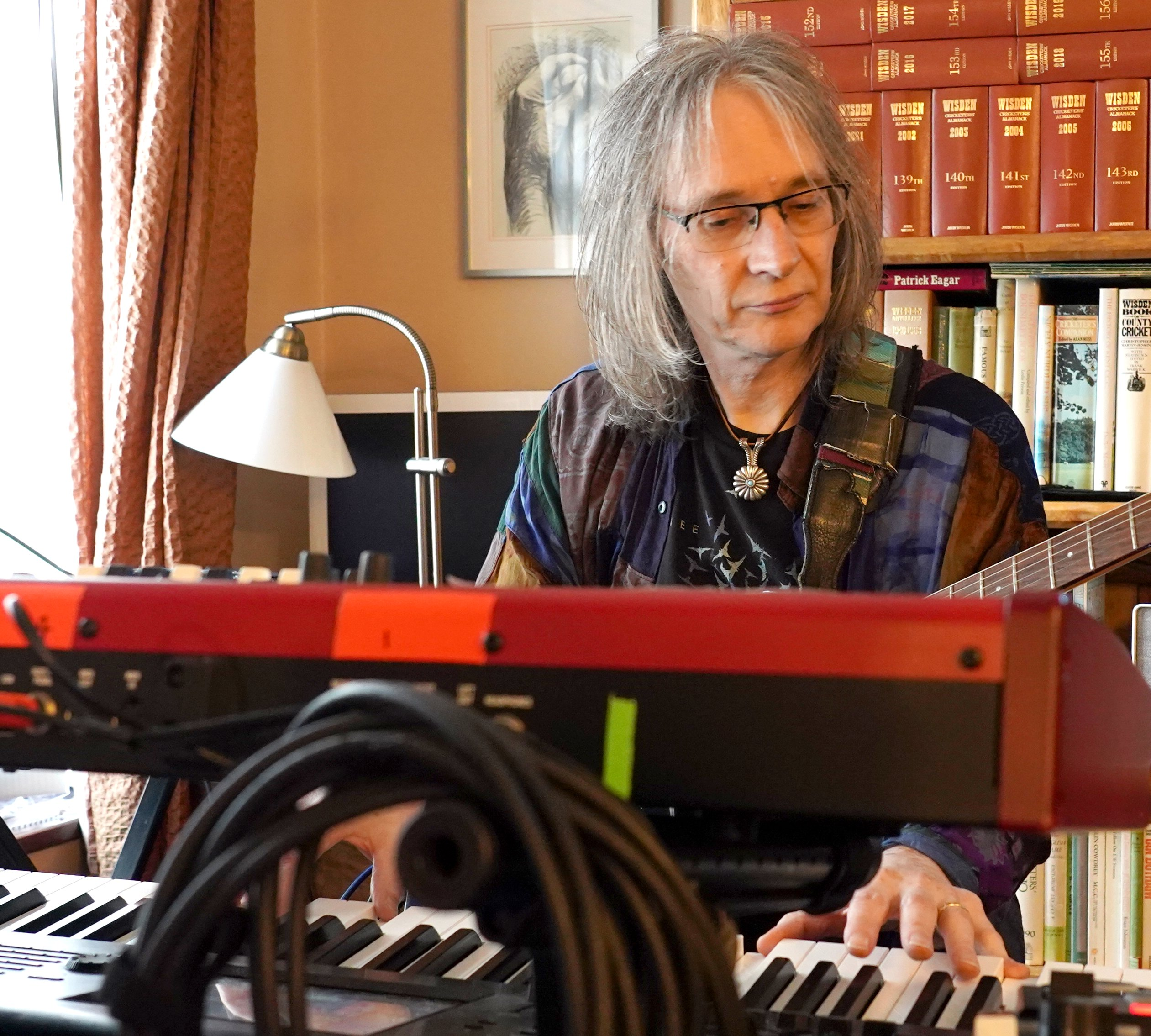
- Bainbridge performing with Sally Minnear in 2024

Background information
- Born: June 1959 (age 66); Darlington, England
- Genres: Progressive rock; folk rock; classical; Celtic
- Occupations: Musician; composer; producer; arranger
- Instruments: Guitar; keyboards; bouzouki
- Member of: Iona; Celestial Fire; Lifesigns; Strawbs; Dave Bainbridge & Sally Minnear; Circuline
- Website: davebainbridgemusic.com

Dave Bainbridge is an English guitarist and keyboard player who has played with the Strawbs since 2015 and Lifesigns since 2016. With Dave Fitzgerald, he co-founded the Christian progressive and Celtic folk themed band Iona.

== Early life ==
Born in Darlington, England, and from a musical family, Bainbridge had piano lessons from the age of eight and learned guitar from age 13. He joined his first band Exodus at age 14.

Bainbridge went to Leeds College of Music, gaining the "BBC Radio 2 Best Jazz Soloist Award" for piano whilst there and the Sam Hood Rosebowl for Outstanding Performance. He graduated with first class honours and a distinction in arranging.

== Career ==
Whilst at college Bainbridge met singer and songwriter Adrian Snell. The result was a working partnership spanning eight years and through which he would first meet Joanne Hogg and David Fitzgerald. This partnership went on to be the founding force behind the group Iona.

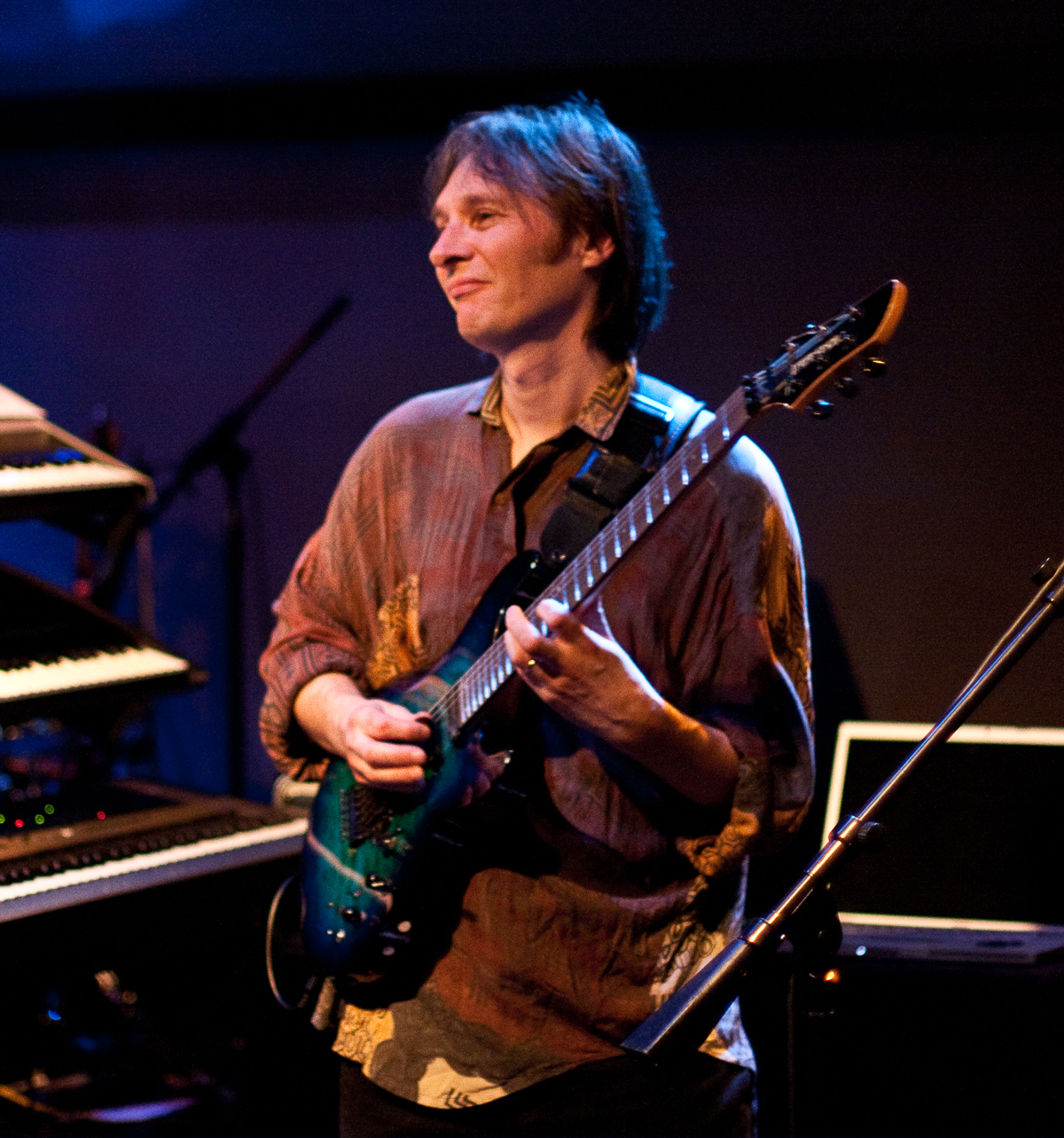
Dave Bainbridge performing with Iona (2010)

Bainbridge toured the world with Iona between 1989 and 2015, releasing 13 albums. Bainbridge's career as a solo artist, keyboardist, guitarist, bouzouki player, composer, improviser, producer, arranger, teacher and sound mixer has led him into many musical genres and work with numerous artists including: Strawbs (current keyboardist), Jack Bruce, Buddy Guy, Troy Donockley (Nightwish), Nick Beggs, Gloria Gaynor, Moya Brennan, Robert Fripp, Mae McKenna, Phil Keaggy, Paul Jones and many others.

Bainbridge has composed soundtracks for numerous short films, TV and multimedia productions and has co-written a guitar concerto with Nick Fletcher, released on the album Cathedral of Dreams (2009).

Bainbridge has released four solo studio albums, Veil of Gossamer (2004), Celestial Fire (2014), his first solo piano album The Remembering (2016), and To the Far Away (2021). The Celestial Fire album led to the formation of the band of the same name in 2015 and the Celestial Fire band's Live in the UK DVD/2 cd album was released in April 2017.

Bainbridge has also released two collaborative albums with Troy Donockley and two with Iona's David Fitzgerald.

His live projects include his band Celestial Fire, Strawbs, the Dave Bainbridge and Sally Minnear duo, Lifesigns, and occasional solo concerts. Bainbridge was arranger and musical director for Adrian Snell's live performances in the Netherlands of his works The Passion, Light of the World and Alpha and Omega, all of which feature a full band of Dutch session musicians, vocal soloists and a 60-piece choir. In 2024 he toured with Colin Blunstone of the Zombies.

== Musical description ==
A multi-instrumentalist and songwriter, Bainbridge's solo material continues in the style established in Iona, fusing progressive rock, Celtic folk, classical and improvisational elements.

A number of members of Iona have recorded solo albums, or co-operated on each others.

== Discography ==
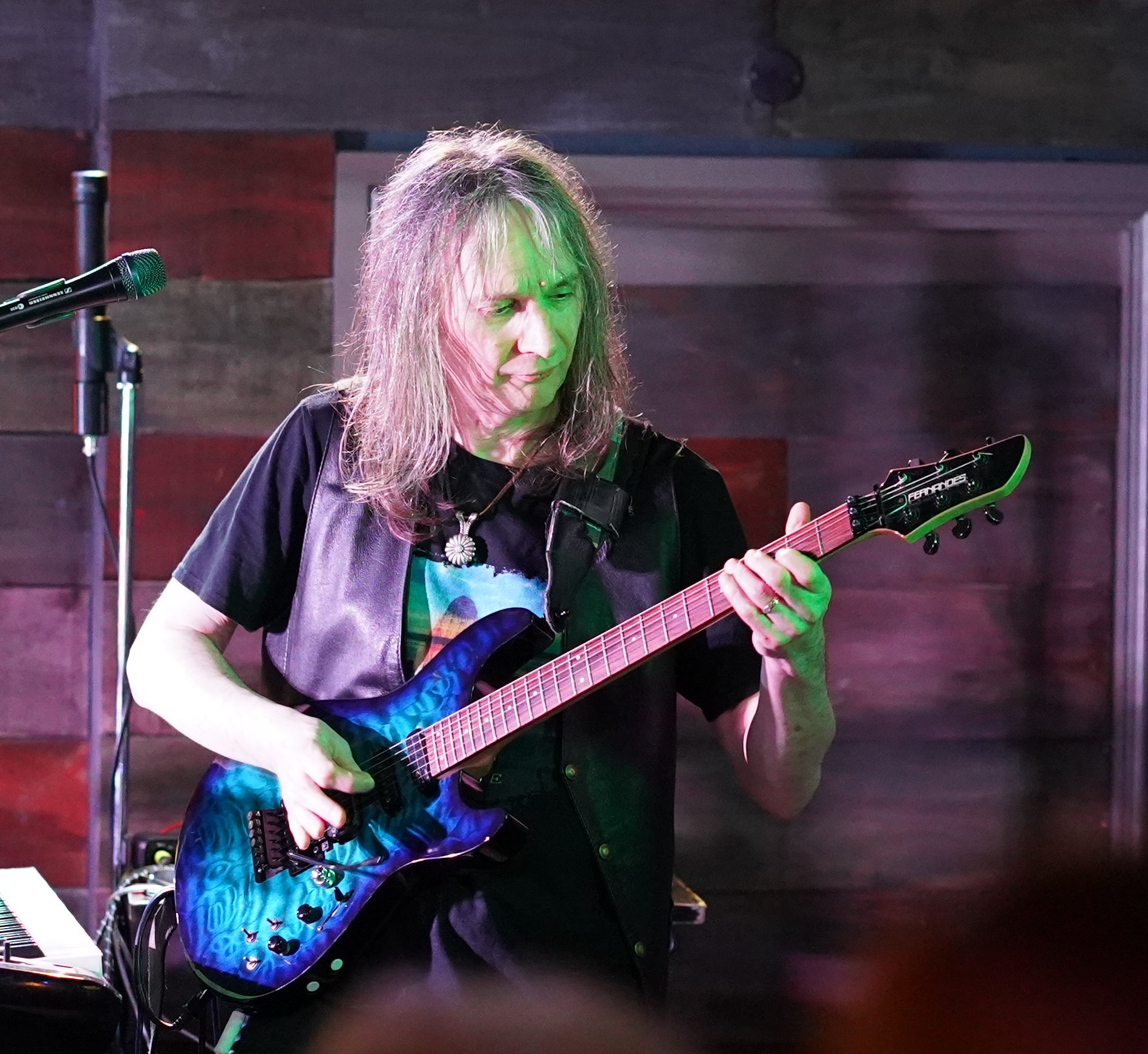
Bainbridge with Lifesigns in 2023

=== Solo ===
- Veil of Gossamer (2004)
- Celestial Fire (2014)
- The Remembering (2016)
- Live in the Studio (DVD) (2018) Dave Bainbridge & Sally Minnear
- To the Far Away (2021)
- On The Edge (Of What Could Be) (2025)

=== Celestial Fire Band ===
- Celestial Fire - Live in the UK (2017)

=== With Iona ===
see Iona for a list of their recordings

=== With Dave Fitzgerald ===
- Eye of the Eagle (1998)
- Eye of the Eagle (DVD) (2005)
- Life Journey (Dave Bainbridge) (2009)

=== With Troy Donockley ===
- When Worlds Collide (2005)
- From Silence (2005)
- From Silence (DVD) (2005)

=== With Strawbs ===
- The Ferryman's Curse (2017)
- Settlement (2021)

=== With Lifesigns ===
- Cardington (2017)
- Altitude (2021)

=== With Downes-Braide Association ===
- Halcyon Hymns (2021)
- Celestial Songs (2023)

=== With Circuline ===
- C.O.R.E (2024)

=== Other collaborations ===
- Songs for Luca (2003) (with other Iona members and various other artists)
- Songs for Luca 2 (2007) (with other Iona members and various other artists)
- Breaking of the Dawn (2007) (with Nick Fletcher, featuring Yvonne Lyon)
- Cathedral of Dreams (2009) (with Nick Fletcher)
- Chronofonia (2020) (with an international ensemble)
