= Elizabeth McGovern =

American actress (born 1961)

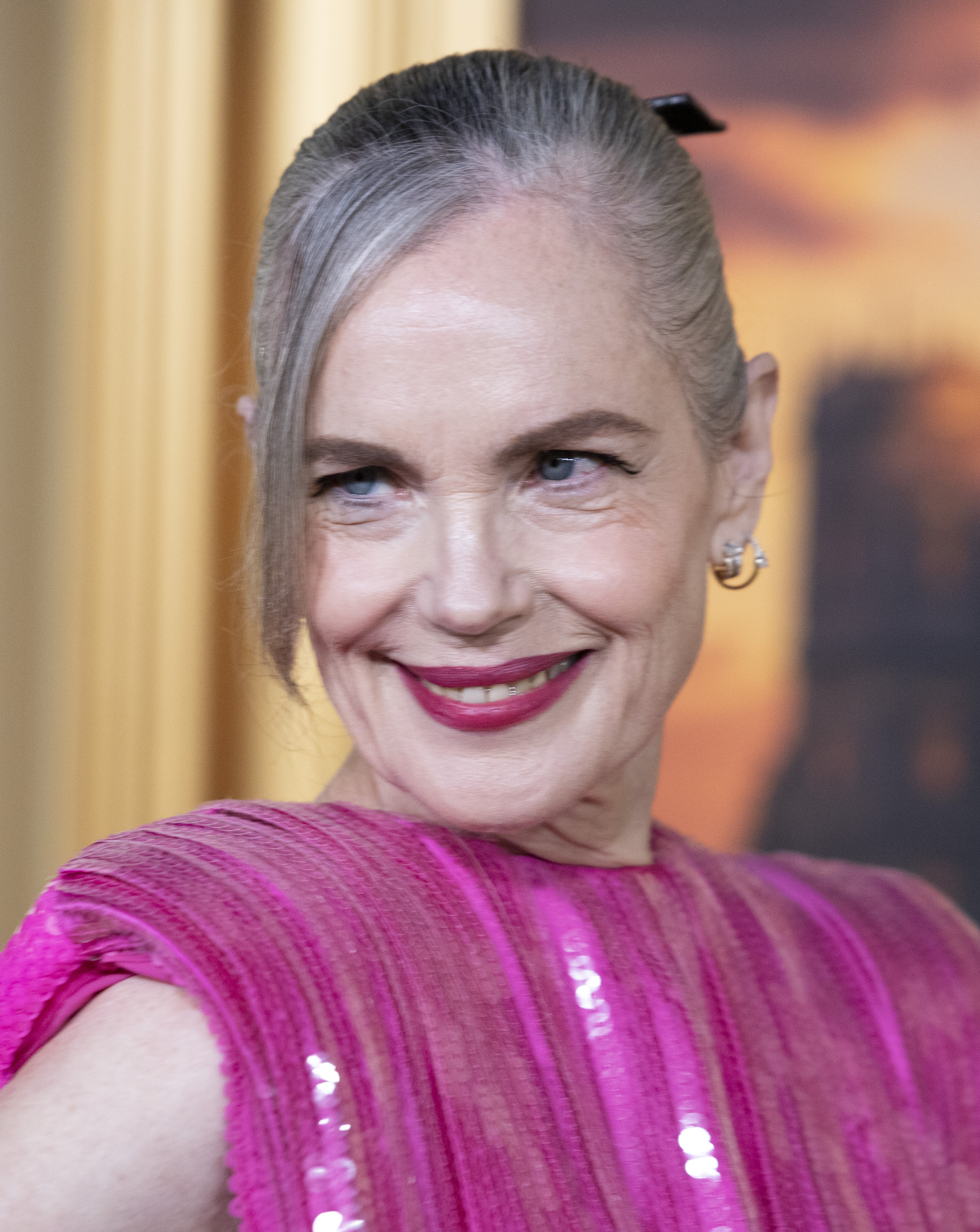
- McGovern in 2025
- Born: Elizabeth Lee McGovern; July 18, 1961 (age 65); Evanston, Illinois, U.S.
- Occupations: Actress; musician
- Years active: 1979–present
- Spouse: Simon Curtis (m. 1992)
- Children: 2
- Musical career
- Instruments: Vocals; guitar
- Website: elizabethmcgovern.co.uk

Elizabeth Lee McGovern (born July 18, 1961) is an American actress. She has received three Screen Actors Guild Awards, as well as nominations for an Academy Award, a Primetime Emmy Award, a BAFTA Award, a Satellite Award, and two Golden Globe Awards, among numerous other career plaudits and honors.

Born in Evanston, Illinois on July 18, 1961, McGovern spent most of her early life in Los Angeles. After attending the American Conservatory Theater and the Juilliard School, she made her feature film debut in Ordinary People (1980). For her role as Evelyn Nesbit in the film adaptation of Ragtime (1981), she received a nomination for the Academy Award for Best Supporting Actress. She subsequently had lead roles in a number of major studio films, including Once Upon a Time in America (1984), She's Having a Baby (1987), The Bedroom Window (1987), The Handmaid's Tale (1990), and The Wings of the Dove (1997).

In 2007, McGovern, after years of studying guitar, formed the musical group Sadie and the Hotheads, with whom she has released four studio albums since 2016. She gained further international attention for her portrayal of Cora Crawley, Countess of Grantham, in the British drama series Downton Abbey (2010–2015), for which she was nominated for an Emmy Award and Golden Globe Award. She reprised her role as Cora in the subsequent films Downton Abbey (2019), Downton Abbey: A New Era (2022) and Downton Abbey: The Grand Finale (2025).

== Early life ==
McGovern was born in Evanston, Illinois, the daughter of Katharine Wolcott (née Watts), a high school teacher, and William Montgomery McGovern, Jr., a university professor. She is of Irish, English, and Scottish descent. Her younger sister is novelist Cammie McGovern. Her paternal grandfather was adventurer William Montgomery McGovern, her maternal great-grandfathers were U.S. diplomat Ethelbert Watts and Admiral Charles P. Snyder, and her maternal great-great-grandfather was Congressman Charles P. Snyder.

When McGovern was 10 years old, she relocated with her family from Illinois to Los Angeles, California, where her father accepted a teaching position at UCLA School of Law. She attended North Hollywood High School, where she began performing in school plays. After high school, she attended the American Conservatory Theater in San Francisco, and studied toward a Bachelor of Fine Arts in Drama at the Juilliard School in New York City as a member of Group 12 from 1979 to 1981, but left without a degree.

== Career ==
In 1980, while studying at Juilliard, McGovern was offered a part in what became her first film, Ordinary People, in which she played the girlfriend of troubled teenager Conrad Jarrett (Timothy Hutton). The following year she completed her acting education at the American Conservatory Theater and Juilliard, and began to appear in plays, first off-Broadway and later in famous theaters.

In 1981, she earned an Academy Award nomination for Best Supporting Actress for her role as Evelyn Nesbit in the film Ragtime. She then appeared in Beginners (1982).

In 1984, she starred in Sergio Leone's gangster epic Once Upon a Time in America as Robert De Niro's romantic interest Deborah Gelly. She had a leading role in another film that year, Racing with the Moon, a coming-of-age story also starring Sean Penn and Nicolas Cage.

In 1989, she played Mickey Rourke's girlfriend in Johnny Handsome, directed by Walter Hill, and the same year she appeared as a rebellious lesbian in Volker Schlöndorff's film The Handmaid's Tale.

McGovern co-starred with Kevin Bacon in a romantic comedy, She's Having a Baby, directed by John Hughes, and starred in the thriller The Bedroom Window, directed by Curtis Hanson. She teamed with Michael Caine in 1990's A Shock to the System, a comic mystery about a man who plots the murder of his wife.

In a 1994 comedy, The Favor, McGovern played a woman who cheats on her boyfriend (played by Brad Pitt) by becoming her married best friend's proxy in a tryst with a man the friend has fantasized about.

McGovern appeared in a number of films in the 21st century, including Woman in Gold, a drama starring Helen Mirren and directed by her husband Simon Curtis.

In 2018, McGovern starred in The Chaperone, directed by Michael Engler and written by Julian Fellowes, whom she also worked with on the British drama series Downton Abbey. Based on the novel by Laura Moriarty, McGovern played Norma Carlisle, a middle-aged wife and mother who volunteers to chaperone the young Louise Brooks to New York City to study dance at the Denishawn School. The Chaperone is the first film that McGovern has also produced. Her husband, Simon Curtis, was an executive producer for the film.

McGovern reprised her role as Cora Crawley, Countess of Grantham for the Downton Abbey film in 2019, its 2022 sequel and Downton Abbey: The Grand Finale (2025) . The films continue the storyline of the TV series.

=== Television ===
McGovern has appeared in several television productions, mostly in the UK. In 1999 and 2000, McGovern played Marguerite St. Just in a BBC television series loosely based on the novel The Scarlet Pimpernel. She also starred in the four-part television crime drama series Thursday the 12th that same year.

On American TV, she appeared in a 2007 episode of Law & Order: Special Victims Unit titled "Harm", in which her character of Dr. Faith Sutton was a psychiatrist accused of complicity in detainee abuse. Her other television work includes Broken Glass (Arthur Miller, 1996); Tales from the Crypt; The Changeling; Tales from Hollywood; the HBO series Men and Women; The Man in the Brooks Brothers Shirt; Shelley Duvall's Faerie Tale Theatre ("Snow White and the Seven Dwarfs"); and If Not for You (CBS 1995, own series).

In May 2007, she played Ellen Doubleday, Daphne du Maurier's paramour, in Daphne, a BBC2 television drama by Amy Jenkins based on Margaret Forster's biography of the author.

In December 2008, McGovern appeared as Dame Celia Westholme in "Appointment with Death", an episode of Agatha Christie's Poirot. In the same year, she appeared in the three-part BBC comedy series Freezing, written by James Wood and directed and co-produced by her husband Simon Curtis. First broadcast on BBC Four, it was also shown on BBC2 in February 2008. McGovern played an American expatriate actress named Elizabeth, living in Chiswick with her publisher husband, played by Hugh Bonneville, and co-starring Tom Hollander as her theatrical agent.

From 2010 to 2015, she portrayed Cora Crawley, Countess of Grantham, wife of Robert Crawley, 7th Earl of Grantham (played by Hugh Bonneville) in the British TV series Downton Abbey, and also in the 2019, 2022 and 2025 film adaptations. Downton Abbey was the third time McGovern and Bonneville have been cast as a married couple on screen, having previously co-starred in Freezing and Thursday the 12th together.

=== Music ===
McGovern is also a singer-songwriter and plays the guitar. In 2008, she began fronting the band Sadie and the Hotheads at The Castle pub venue in Portobello Road, London. The band released an album of songs she developed with The Nelson Brothers, who are now part of the band. The album, I Can Wait, also includes Ron Knights on bass and Rowan Oliver, borrowed from Goldfrapp, as drummer for the recording sessions. Michelle Dockery, who plays McGovern's eldest daughter in Downton Abbey, has occasionally sung with the band. Dockery was also a guest backing vocalist on the band's second album How Not To Lose Things, released in 2012. Terl Bryant also joined the band, taking over from Rowan Oliver as drummer and percussionist.

Throughout 2013, Sadie and the Hotheads toured the UK and Europe and performed in festivals including the Isle of Wight Festival, Montreux Jazz Festival and Edinburgh Festival Fringe. At the end of the year they announced that they were working on their third album with support from former direct-to-fan crowdfunding company PledgeMusic. Still Waiting was released in early 2014 prior to their next UK tour as the support act for Mike and the Mechanics.

McGovern recorded three Christmas tracks in 2014. Her rendition of It Came Upon a Midnight Clear and duet with Julian Ovenden performing The First Noel appear on the double-disc album Christmas At Downton Abbey, produced by Warner Music. Sadie and the Hotheads also released their cover version of the Christmas song The Little Drummer Boy.

Following the conclusion of TV series Downton Abbey in late 2015, McGovern and her band Sadie and the Hotheads began work on a fourth album and embarked on a mini tour of the UK. While they continued to record their new album, the band released a compilation album of songs from their first three albums entitled The Collection (Everybody's Got A Song) in early 2016.

In 2017, McGovern and "Hothead" Simon Nelson collaborated with American singer and musician Duke Robillard on a track for his album Duke Robillard & His Dames of Rhythm. McGovern sings vocals for "Me, Myself and I" while Nelson is a guest musician on electric guitar for the track.

McGovern's fifth album, The Truth, was released in early 2019. Unlike her previous albums with her band, The Truth was released under her name, though it features all of the musicians from Sadie and the Hotheads. The album includes a track on which Samuel L. Jackson appears as a guest vocalist.

In July 2025, McGovern released her sixth album Let's Stop Fighting under the name of her band Sadie and the Hotheads.

=== Theatre ===
Roles in New York include:

- Melissa Gardner in Love Letters (A R Gurney) at the Edison Theatre, October 1989
- Ophelia in Hamlet with the Roundabout Theater Company at the Criterion Center Stage Right, April 1992.
- Mrs. Conway in Time and the Conways at the American Airlines Theatre, October 2017

In her theatre programme CVs (below), McGovern lists her other theatre work in the U.S. as including:

- My Sister in This House (Wendy Kesselman)
- Painting Churches (Tina Howe)
- The Hitch-Hiker
- Viola in Twelfth Night
- A Map of the World (David Hare)
- Aunt Dan and Lemon (Wallace Shawn)
- A Midsummer Night's Dream at the New York Shakespeare Festival, Winter 1987
- When I Was a Girl I Used to Scream and Shout (Sharman Macdonald)
- Maids of Honour
- Three Sisters (Chekhov)
- As You Like It
- Ava Gardner in Ava: The Secret Conversations at Geffen Playhouse in Los Angeles, April - May 2023
- Ava Gardner in Ava: The Secret Conversations at New York City Center in New York, July 2025 - September 2025

Since moving to London, McGovern's stage work has included:

- Jenny in The Misanthrope (Molière freely adapted by Martin Crimp) at the Young Vic Theatre, February 1996
- Darlene in Hurlyburly (David Rabe) at the Old Vic Theatre, March 1997
- Nan and Lina in Three Days of Rain (Richard Greenberg) at the Donmar Warehouse, March and November 1999
- Beth in Dinner with Friends (Donald Margulies) at the Hampstead Theatre, June 2001
- Hester Prynne in The Scarlet Letter (Nathaniel Hawthorne adapted by Phyllis Nagy) at the Minerva Theatre, August 2005
- Jackie Kennedy in Aristo at the Minerva Theatre, September – October 2008
- Judith Brown in Complicit by Joe Sutton in The Old Vic, January 2009
- Miss A in The Shawl by David Mamet in the Arcola Theatre, September 2009
- June in Sunset at the Villa Thalia by Alexi Kaye Campbell at the Royal National Theatre, May - August 2016
- Veronica in God of Carnage by Yasmina Reza at the Theatre Royal, Bath, August – September 2018
- Anne in The Starry Messenger by Kenneth Lonergan at Wyndham's Theatre, May - August 2019
- Veronica in God of Carnage by Yasmina Reza, on tour in the UK, January - February 2020
- Ava Gardner in Ava: The Secret Conversations at Riverside Studios in Hammersmith, London, January - April 2022
- Martha in Who's Afraid of Virginia Woolf? by Edward Albee at the Theatre Royal, Bath, January - February 2023

McGovern was awarded the 2013 Will Award by the Shakespeare Theatre Company.

In early 2020, McGovern was in rehearsal to star in a revival of The Little Foxes by American playwright Lillian Hellman at the Gate Theatre in Dublin. However, due to the Impact of the COVID-19 pandemic on the performing arts, the show has been postponed indefinitely.

== Personal life ==
In 1992, McGovern married British film director and producer Simon Curtis. The couple have two daughters and live in Chiswick, London.

== Filmography ==
=== Film ===
Year	Title	Role	Notes
1980	Ordinary People	Jeannine Pratt	
1980	Last Year's Model	Unknown	Short film
1981	Ragtime	Evelyn Nesbit	Nominated—Academy Award for Best Supporting Actress; Nominated—Golden Globe Award for New Star of the Year – Actress
1983	Lovesick	Chloe Allen	
1984	Once Upon a Time in America	Deborah Gelly (adult)	
1984	Racing with the Moon	Caddie Winger	
1986	Native Son	Mary Dalton	
1987	The Bedroom Window	Denise	
1988	She's Having a Baby	Kristy Bainbridge Briggs	
1989	Johnny Handsome	Donna McCarty	
1990	The Handmaid's Tale	Moira	
1990	A Shock to the System	Stella Anderson	
1990	Tune in Tomorrow...	Elena Quince	
1993	King of the Hill	Lydia	
1993	Me and Veronica	Fanny	
1994	The Favor	Emily	
1995	Wings of Courage	Noelle Guillaumet	Short film
1997	The Wings of the Dove	Susie "Sue" Stringham	
1998	The Man with Rain in His Shoes	Diane	
1998	The Misadventures of Margaret	Till Turner	
2000	Manila	Elizabeth	
2000	The House of Mirth	Mrs. Carry Fisher	
2001	Buffalo Soldiers	Mrs. Berman	
2006	The Truth	Donna	
2008	Inconceivable	Tallulah "Tutu" Williams	
2010	Kick-Ass	Mrs. Lizewski	
2010	Clash of the Titans	Marmara	
2011	Angel's Crest	Jane	
2012	Cheerful Weather for the Wedding	Mrs. Thatcham	
2015	Unexpected	Samantha's mother	
2015	Woman in Gold	Judge Florence Cooper	
2015	Swung	Dolly	
2016	Showing Roots	Shirley	
2017	The Wife	Elaine Mozell	
2018	The Commuter	Karen McCauley	
2018	The Chaperone	Norma	
2019	Downton Abbey	Cora Crawley, Countess of Grantham	
2022	Downton Abbey: A New Era	Cora Crawley, Countess of Grantham	
2024	And Mrs	Margaret	
2025	Downton Abbey: The Grand Finale	Cora Crawley, Countess of Grantham	
2027	Seasons	TBA	Filming

=== Television ===
Year	Title	Role	Notes
1979	California Fever	Lisa Bannister	Episode: "The Girl from Somewhere"
1984	Faerie Tale Theatre	Snow White	Episode: "Snow White and the Seven Dwarfs"
1990	Women & Men: Stories of Seduction	Vicki	Television film
1991	Ashenden	Aileen Somerville	Television film Nominated—CableACE Award for Best Supporting Actress in a Miniseries or a Movie
1992	Tales from Hollywood	Helen Schwartz	Television film
1993	Performance	Beatrice-Joanna	Episode: "The Changeling"
1995	If Not for You	Jessie Kent	8 episodes
1995	Broken Trust	Janice Dillon	Television film
1996	Broken Glass	Margaret Hymen	Television film
1996	The Summer of Ben Tyler	Celia Rayburn	Television film
1996	Tracey Takes On...	Judge Loring	Episode: "Vanity"
1996	Tales from the Crypt	Laura Kendall	Episode: "Horror in the Night"
1997	Clover	Sara Kate	Television film
1999	The Scarlet Pimpernel	Lady Marguerite Blakeney	3 episodes
2000	Thursday the 12th	Candice Hopper	Television film
2001	The Flamingo Rising	Edna Lee	Television film
2001	Hawk	Susie Hawkins	Television film
2001	Table 12	Mel	Episode: "Preserves"
2003	The Brotherhood of Poland, New Hampshire	Helen Shaw	7 episodes
2006	Three Moons over Milford	Laura Davis	8 episodes
2007	Daphne	Ellen Doubleday	Television film
2007	A Room with a View	Mrs. Honeychurch	Television film
2007	Law & Order: Special Victims Unit	Dr. Faith Sutton	Episode: "Harm"
2007–2008	Freezing	Elizabeth	3 episodes
2008	Agatha Christie's Poirot	Dame Celia Westholme	Episode: "Appointment with Death"
2009	10 Minute Tales	The Ex-Wife	Episode: "The Running of the Deer"
2010–2015	Downton Abbey	Cora, Countess of Grantham	52 episodes Screen Actors Guild Award for Outstanding Performance by an Ensemble in a Drama Series (2013, 2015); Nominated—Golden Globe Award for Best Actress – Miniseries or Television Film; Nominated—Primetime Emmy Award for Outstanding Lead Actress in a Miniseries or a Movie; Nominated—Satellite Award for Best Actress – Miniseries or Television Film; Nominated—Screen Actors Guild Award for Outstanding Performance by an Ensemble in a Drama Series
2019	War of the Worlds	Helen Brown	8 episodes
2025	Talamasca: The Secret Order	Helen	Main role

== Discography ==
=== Sadie and the Hotheads ===
Year	Album title	Notes
2007	I Can Wait	
2012	How Not to Lose Things	Oh Robert
2014	Still Waiting	
2016	The Collection (Everybody's Got a Song)	Compilation of songs from the first three albums
2025	Let's Stop Fighting	

=== Solo ===
Year	Album title	Notes
2019	The Truth	Features all Sadie and the Hotheads musicians.

=== Album guest appearances ===
Year	Album title	Notes
2014	Christmas At Downton Abbey	Vocals on "It Came Upon A Midnight Clear" and a duet on "The First Noel" with Julian Ovenden.
2017	Duke Robillard & His Dames of Rhythm	Vocals on "Me, Myself and I".
