= Beauty...As Far as the Eye Can See =

Studio album by Terl Bryant
- Released: 1997
- Genres: Progressive rock; Christian rock
- Label: ICC Records
- Producer: Terl Bryant

Terl Bryant chronology
| Psalm (1993) | Beauty...As Far as the Eye Can See (1997) | Timbrel (1999) |

Professional ratings
Review scores
| Source | Rating |
|---|---|
| Tollbooth | (Positive) |

Beauty...As Far as the Eye Can See is an album by ex-Iona drummer Terl Bryant, released in 1997.

== Track listing ==
1. "Blow Spirit Blow"
2. "Keep Me Safe"
3. "In The Shadow Of Great Wings"
4. "Though I Walk"
5. "Barefoot In The Grass/the Old Pipe On The Hob"
6. "Beauty"
7. "A Dangerous Sea"
8. "Angel"
9. "River Of Tears"
10. "Where Do You Go?"
11. "Vision Of Hope"
12. "Ten Drummers Drumming"

== Band ==
- Terl Bryant – drums, percussion
- Juliet Bryant – vocals
- Charlie Groves – vocals
- Dave Bainbridge – guitar, keyboards, hammond
- Troy Donockley – whistles, uilleann pipes
- Mike Haughton – saxophone

== Release details ==
- 1997, UK, ICC Records ICC21730, CD
