= Philip Parker =

Phil or Philip Parker may refer to:

- Sir Philip Parker, uncle of Anne Boleyn
- Philip Parker (of Erwarton) (died 1675) English politician MP for Suffolk
- Philip M. Parker (born 1960) professor of Management Science
- Philip Fotheringham-Parker (1907-1981), English racing driver
- Phil Parker (born 1963), American football player and coach
- Phil Parker, musician on Timbrel (album)

The following were Parker baronets, of Arwaton (1661)

- Sir Philip Parker, 1st Baronet (c. 1625–1690) English politician son of the above, MP for Harwich and Sandwich
- Sir Philip Parker, 2nd Baronet (c. 1650–c. 1698) son of the above
- Sir Philip Parker-a-Morley-Long, 3rd Baronet (1682–1741) English politician son of the above, MP for Harwich
