= Cammie McGovern =

American novelist

- Born: Evanston, Illinois, U.S.
- Occupation: Author
- Children: 3
- Parent(s): William Montgomery McGovern Jr. Katharine Watts
- Relatives: Elizabeth McGovern (sister)
- Website: www.cammiemcgovern.com

Cammie McGovern is the author of five novels for children and young adults: The Art of Seeing, Eye Contact, Neighborhood Watch, Chester & Gus, and Say What You Will.

== Early life ==
McGovern was born in Evanston, Illinois, the daughter of Katharine Wolcott (née Watts), a high school teacher, and William Montgomery McGovern, Jr., a university professor. Her older sister is actress Elizabeth McGovern. When Cammie was seven years old, her father accepted a teaching position with UCLA School of Law and the McGoverns moved to Los Angeles. Her paternal grandfather was adventurer William Montgomery McGovern, her maternal great-grandfathers were U.S. diplomat Ethelbert Watts and Admiral Charles P. Snyder, and her maternal great-great-grandfather was congressman Charles P. Snyder.

She currently lives in Amherst, Massachusetts, with her husband and three sons, the oldest of whom has autism. Many of her life experiences with her family, autism and starting Whole Children influenced her writings.

== Selected works ==
- 2010: Neighborhood Watch - [NL] Buurtwacht (2011) ISBN 9789041420213
