= The Thunderthief =

Studio album by John Paul Jones
- Released: 15 June 2001
- Genre: Progressive rock, hard rock, heavy metal, folk rock, punk rock, instrumental rock
- Length: 46:13
- Label: Discipline Global Mobile
- Producer: John Paul Jones

John Paul Jones chronology
Zooma (1999)	The Thunderthief (2001)

The Thunderthief is John Paul Jones's second solo studio album, released in 2001.

Professional ratings
Review scores
Source	Rating
AllMusic	3/5 stars
Rolling Stone	(favourable)

== Track listing ==
All music and lyrics composed and written by John Paul Jones, except where otherwise noted.

1. "Leafy Meadows" – 5:10
2. "The Thunderthief" (Jones, Peter Blegvad) – 5:58
3. "Hoediddle" – 7:00
4. "Ice Fishing at Night" (Jones, Blegvad) – 4:31
5. "Daphne" – 4:50
6. "Angry Angry" – 5:54
7. "Down to the River to Pray" (Traditional; arranged by Jones) – 4:17
8. "Shibuya Bop" – 5:56
9. "Freedom Song" – 2:37

== Personnel ==
- John Paul Jones – vocals, 4/6/10/12-string bass guitars, bass steel guitar, acoustic/electric guitars, acoustic/electric mandolin, piano, organ, synthesizers, Kyma, koto, autoharp, ukulele, harmonica
- Terl Bryant – drums, percussion, toforan
- Nick Beggs – Chapman Stick on "Leafy Meadows" and "Shibuya Bop"
- Adam Bomb – guitar solo on "Angry Angry"
- Robert Fripp – guitar solo on "Leafy Meadows"
