= John Paul Jones (musician) =

English musician (born 1946)

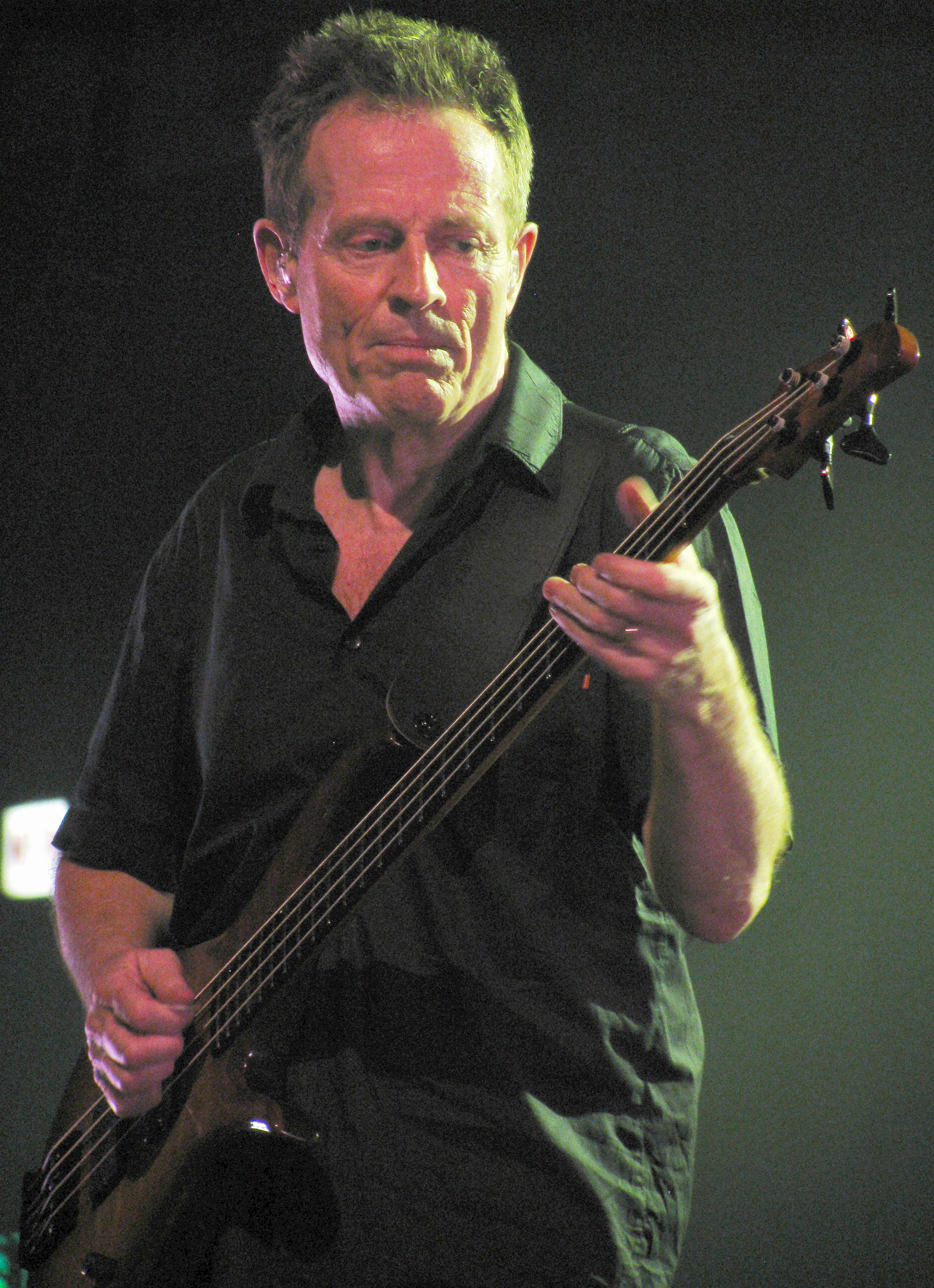
- Jones playing bass guitar in 2010

Background information
- Born: John Baldwin; 3 January 1946 (age 80); Sidcup, Kent, England
- Genres: Rock; blues rock; hard rock; heavy metal; folk rock
- Occupations: Musician; record producer; arranger
- Instruments: Bass guitar; keyboards; mandolin; guitar
- Years active: 1961–present
- Member of: Them Crooked Vultures
- Formerly of: Led Zeppelin
- Website: johnpauljones.com

John Paul Jones (born John Baldwin; 3 January 1946) is an English musician, multi-instrumentalist and record producer who was the bassist and keyboardist for the English rock band Led Zeppelin between 1968 and 1980. He was a session musician and arranger prior to the point when he formed the band with Jimmy Page in 1968 (having previously collaborated with Page on other recording sessions). Jones developed a solo career after drummer John Bonham died and Led Zeppelin disbanded in 1980. He has collaborated with musicians in a variety of genres, including the supergroup Them Crooked Vultures with Dave Grohl, Josh Homme, and Alain Johannes. He was inducted into the Rock and Roll Hall of Fame in 1995 as a member of Led Zeppelin.

== Early years ==
John Baldwin was born in Sidcup, then a part of Kent, on 3 January 1946. He started playing piano when he was six, learning from his father, Joe Baldwin, a pianist and arranger for big bands in the 1940s and 1950s, notably with Ambrose and his Orchestra. His mother was also in the music business, which allowed the family to often perform together touring around England as a vaudeville comedy act. His influences ranged from the blues of Big Bill Broonzy and the jazz of Charles Mingus to the classical piano of Sergei Rachmaninoff.

Because his parents often toured, Baldwin was sent to boarding school at a young age. He was a student at Christ's College, Blackheath, London where he studied music formally. At the age of 14, Baldwin became choirmaster and organist at a local church. That year, he bought his first bass guitar, a Dallas Tuxedo solid-body electric; later, he bought other basses that he part-exchanged until he bought the 1962 Fender Jazz Bass that he used until 1976. Jones has said he was inspired to take up the bass by the fluid playing of Chicago musician Phil Upchurch on his "You Can't Sit Down" song, which includes a memorable bass solo.

== Career ==
=== Session work ===
Baldwin joined his first band, The Deltas, at the age of 15. He then played bass for jazz-rock London group, Jett Blacks, a collective that included guitarist John McLaughlin. His big break came in 1962, when he was hired by Jet Harris and Tony Meehan of the successful British group the Shadows for a two-year stint. Shortly before hiring Baldwin, Harris and Meehan had just had a number 1 hit with "Diamonds" (a track on which Jones' bandmate-to-be Jimmy Page had played). Baldwin's collaboration with the Shadows nearly prevented the future formation of Led Zeppelin, when the parties engaged in talks about the possibility of Baldwin replacing their bassist Brian Locking, who left the band in October 1963, but John Rostill was ultimately chosen to fill the position.

In 1964, on the recommendation of Meehan, Baldwin began studio session work with Decca Records. From then until 1968, he played on hundreds of recording sessions. He soon expanded his studio work by playing keyboards, arranging and undertaking general studio direction, resulting in his services coming under much demand. He worked with numerous artists including the Rolling Stones on Their Satanic Majesties Request (Jones' string arrangement is heard on "She's a Rainbow"); Herman's Hermits; Donovan (on "Sunshine Superman", "Hurdy Gurdy Man", and "Mellow Yellow"); Jeff Beck; Françoise Hardy; Cat Stevens (on "Matthew and Son"); Rod Stewart; Shirley Bassey; Lulu; and numerous others. As well as recording sessions with Dusty Springfield, Jones also played bass for her Talk of the Town series of performances. His arranging and playing on Donovan's "Sunshine Superman" resulted in producer Mickie Most using his services as choice arranger for many of his own projects, with Tom Jones, Nico, Wayne Fontana, the Walker Brothers, and many others. In 1967, Most, as music supervisor, also tasked Jones with arranging the music for Herman's Hermits' theatrical film Mrs. Brown, You've Got a Lovely Daughter, released in January 1968. Such was the extent of Jones' studio work – amounting to hundreds of sessions – that he said years later that "I can't remember three-quarters of the sessions I was on."

It was during his time as a session player that Baldwin adopted the stage name John Paul Jones. This name was suggested to him by a friend, Andrew Loog Oldham, who had seen a poster for the 1959 film John Paul Jones in France. He released his first solo recording as John Paul Jones, "Baja" (written by Lee Hazlewood and produced by Oldham) / "A Foggy Day in Vietnam", as a single on Pye Records in April 1964.

Jones has stated that, as a session musician, he was completing two or three sessions a day, working six or seven days a week. However, by 1968 he was feeling burned out by the heavy workload: "I was arranging 50 or 60 things a month and it was starting to kill me."

=== Led Zeppelin ===
==== Formation ====
During his time as a session player, Jones often crossed paths with guitarist Jimmy Page, a fellow session veteran. In June 1966, Page joined the Yardbirds, and in 1967 Jones contributed to that band's Little Games album. The following winter, during the sessions for Donovan's The Hurdy Gurdy Man, Jones expressed to Page a desire to be part of any projects the guitarist might be planning. Later that year, the Yardbirds disbanded, leaving Page and bassist Chris Dreja to complete previously booked Yardbirds dates in Scandinavia. Before a new band could be assembled, Dreja left to take up photography. Jones, at the suggestion of his wife, asked Page about the vacant position, and the guitarist eagerly invited Jones to collaborate. Page later explained:

I was working at the sessions for Donovan's Hurdy Gurdy Man, and John Paul Jones was looking after the musical arrangements. During a break, he asked me if I could use a bass player in the new group I was forming. He had a proper music training, and he had quite brilliant ideas. I jumped at the chance of getting him.

Vocalist Robert Plant and drummer John Bonham joined the two to form a quartet. Initially dubbed the "New Yardbirds" for the Scandinavian dates, the band soon became known as Led Zeppelin.

==== Contributions ====
Derivative of Jones' triquetra sigil used in the untitled album commonly known as Led Zeppelin IV

Jones was responsible for the bass lines of the group, notably those in "Ramble On" and "The Lemon Song" (Led Zeppelin II), and shifting time signatures, such as those in "Black Dog" (Led Zeppelin IV). As half of Led Zeppelin's rhythm section with drummer John Bonham, Jones shared an appreciation for funk and soul rhythmic grooves which strengthened and enhanced their musical affinity. In an interview he gave to Global Bass magazine, Jones remarked on this common musical interest:

Yeah, we were both huge Motown and Stax fans and general soul music fans, James Brown fans. Which is one of the reasons why I've always said that Zeppelin was one of the few bands to "swing". We actually had a groove in those days. People used to come to our shows and dance, which was great. To see all the women dancing, it was really brilliant. You didn't necessarily see that at a Black Sabbath show or whatever: So we were different in that way. We were a groovy band. We used all our black pop music influences as a key to the rock that went over the top.

After retiring his Fender Jazz Bass (which he had been using since his days with The Shadows in the early 1960s) from touring in 1975, Jones switched to using custom-designed Alembic basses for touring. However, he still preferred to use the Jazz Bass in the studio and in a 2010 interview mentioned that he still had that bass at the time. Jones' keyboard skills added an eclectic dimension that realised Led Zeppelin as more than just a hard rock band. Keyboard highlights include the delicate "The Rain Song" (Houses of the Holy) played on a Mellotron; the funky "Trampled Under Foot", played on a Clavinet (Physical Graffiti); and the eastern scales of "Kashmir", also played on a Mellotron (also on Physical Graffiti). In live performances, Jones' keyboard showpiece was "No Quarter", often lasting for up to half-an-hour and sometimes including snatches of "Amazing Grace", Joaquín Rodrigo's "Concierto de Aranjuez", which had inspired Miles Davis' Sketches of Spain, and variations of classical pieces by composers such as Rachmaninoff.

Jones' diverse contributions to the group extended to the use of other instruments including mandolin, recorder, and an unusual triple-necked acoustic instrument consisting of a mandolin and six and twelve string guitars. Jones often used bass pedals to supplement the band's sound while he was playing keyboards and mandolin. On the band's 1977 tour of the United States, Jones would sing lead vocals on "The Battle of Evermore", filling in for Sandy Denny, who had sung on the studio version.

==== Profile ====
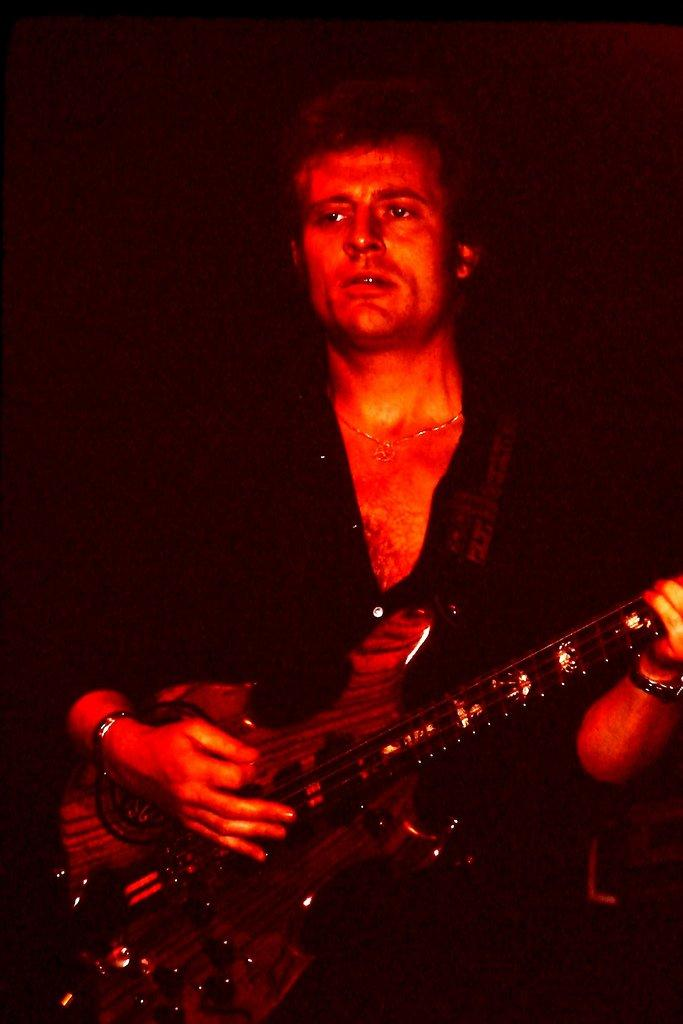
Jones on stage with Led Zeppelin in Mannheim, 1980

While all members of Led Zeppelin had a reputation for off-stage excess (a label that has been claimed was exaggerated), Jones was widely seen as the quietest and most reserved member of the group. For his part, Jones has claimed that he had just as much fun on the road as his bandmates but was more discreet about it, stating "I did more drugs than I care to remember. I just did it quietly." Benoit Gautier, an employee of Atlantic Records in France, echoed this impression, stating that "The wisest guy in Led Zeppelin was John Paul Jones. Why? He never got caught in an embarrassing situation."

In an interview, Jones explained that fame with Led Zeppelin was not something that he ever became preoccupied with:

Not really; I'd done it all before ... I would like to think that I wasn't too stupid either. I tried to stay out of the drift of the rock star's path, mainly because I needed my sanity and freedom on the road. So generally, I used to check out of the hotel, and then get out on the street. I'd go walking ... I'm not as recognizable as Plant and Page. Plus, I used to change my appearance all the time just to make sure I wasn't as recognizable ... Generally, I'm pretty quickly into the shadows ... I once read the Beatles did a whole tour of America and never left their hotel rooms. And I thought, "I can't see the point of travelling around the world and not seeing anything."

Following exhausting tours and extended periods of time away from his family, by late 1973 Jones was beginning to show signs of disillusionment. He considered quitting Led Zeppelin to spend more time with his family, but was talked into returning by the band's manager, Peter Grant. He joked that he was interested in becoming the choirmaster of Winchester Cathedral, which was reported as fact in several sources. Jones later explained his reservations:

I didn't want to harm the group, but I didn't want my family to fall apart either. We toured a huge amount in those early days. We were all very tired and under pressure and it just came to a head. When I first joined the band, I didn't think it would go on for that long, two or three years perhaps, and then I'd carry on with my career as a musician and doing movie music.

==== "Royal Orleans" ====
It is rumoured that the Led Zeppelin song "Royal Orleans", from their album Presence, is about an experience Jones once had on tour in the United States. The song is about a person who mistakenly takes a drag queen up to his hotel room, who then falls asleep with a joint of marijuana in hand, lighting the room on fire. "Royal Orleans" was the name of a hotel where the members of Led Zeppelin would stay when they visited New Orleans, because not as many people asked for autographs there. In an interview he gave to Mojo magazine in 2007, Jones clarified the reliability of this rumour, stating:

The transvestites were actually friends of Richard Cole's; normal friendly people and we were all at some bar. That I mistook a transvestite for a girl is rubbish; that happened in another country to somebody else ... Anyway 'Stephanie' ended up in my room and we rolled a joint or two and I fell asleep and set fire to the hotel room, as you do, ha ha, and when I woke up it was full of firemen!

==== Other work ====
Jones's involvement with Led Zeppelin did not put a halt to his session work. In 1969 he returned to the studio to play bass guitar on the Family Dogg's A Way of Life album. Jones was Madeline Bell's first choice to produce and arrange her 1974 album Comin' Atcha. He has also played bass on the opening track for the Roy Harper album HQ, which also featured guitarist David Gilmour. Other contributions include playing bass on Wings' Rockestra, Back to the Egg along with Zeppelin's drummer John Bonham.

=== After Led Zeppelin ===
==== 1980–2000 ====
Led Zeppelin dissolved in 1980 with the death of John Bonham. "At the time that John died, I had just moved to Devon to bring up my family", Jones said. "So, after the split, I was completely out of everything. And I must say I didn't miss it."

Jones subsequently collaborated with artists including Diamanda Galás, R.E.M., Jars of Clay, Heart, Ben E. King, Peter Gabriel, Foo Fighters, Lenny Kravitz, Cinderella, The Mission, La Fura dels Baus, the Harp Consort, Brian Eno, the Butthole Surfers, and Uncle Earl.

He appeared on sessions and videos for Paul McCartney and was involved in the soundtrack of the film Give My Regards to Broad Street. In 1985, Jones was asked by director Michael Winner to provide the soundtrack for the film Scream for Help, with Jimmy Page appearing on two tracks. Jones provides vocals for two of the songs. He recorded and toured with singer Diamanda Galás on her 1994 album, The Sporting Life (co-credited to John Paul Jones). In 1985, Jones joined Page and Plant for the Live Aid concert, with Phil Collins and Tony Thompson on drums. The former members again re-formed for the Atlantic Records 40th Anniversary concert on 14 May 1988. Page, Plant and Jones, with John Bonham's son Jason, closed the event. In 1992, Jones arranged the orchestration on the R.E.M. album Automatic for the People.

In 1995, the band Heart released a live acoustic album called The Road Home. It was produced by Jones, and featured him playing several instruments. Also in 1995, Andrew Lawrence-King's Harp Consort released a set of three Spanish language songs in 17th-century style of Jones's own composition, accompanied by baroque instruments including harps, chitarrone, guitars, lirone, viola da gamba and percussion (this 10-minute CD, titled Amores Pasados, was coupled with The Harp Consort's debut record, Luz y Norte).

==== 2000–present ====
Zooma, his debut solo album, was released in September 1999 on Robert Fripp's DGM label and followed up in 2001 by The Thunderthief. Both albums were accompanied by tours, in which he played with Nick Beggs (Chapman Stick) and Terl Bryant (drums).

In 2004, he toured as part of the group Mutual Admiration Society, along with Glen Phillips (the front man for the band Toad the Wet Sprocket) and the members of the band Nickel Creek.

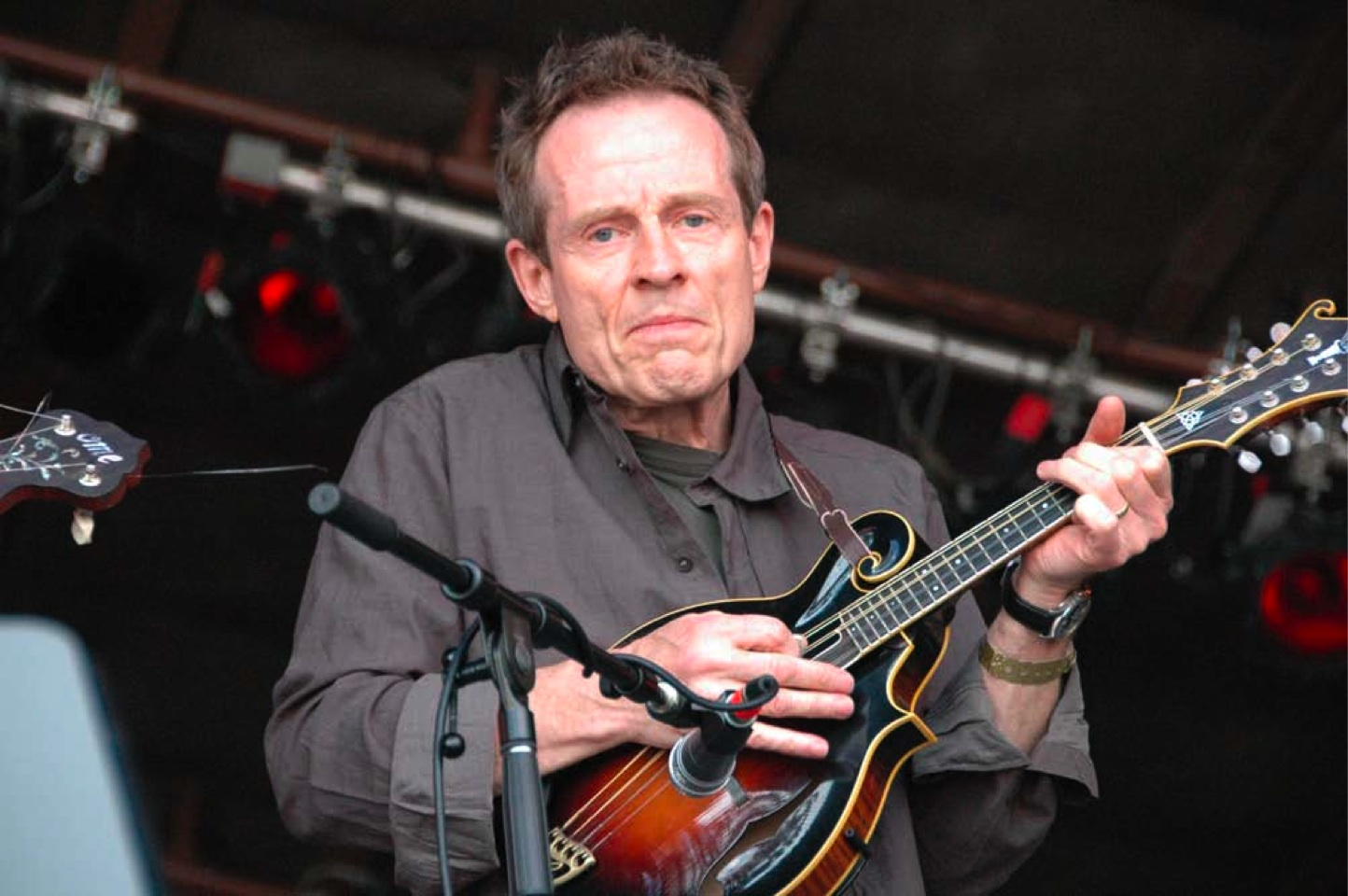
Jones playing mandolin in 2007

Jones plays on two tracks on the Foo Fighters' album In Your Honor. He plays mandolin on "Another Round" and piano on "Miracle", both of which are on the acoustic disc. The band's frontman Dave Grohl (a big Led Zeppelin fan) has described Jones' guest appearance as the "second greatest thing to happen to me in my life".

He has also branched out as a record producer, having produced such albums as the Mission's album Children, the Datsuns' second album Outta Sight, Outta Mind (2004) and Uncle Earl's Waterloo, Tennessee album of Old-time music, released in March 2007 on Rounder Records.

In May 2007, he accompanied Robyn Hitchcock and Ruby Wright in performing the song "Gigolo Aunt" at a tribute for Pink Floyd founder Syd Barrett in London, which he did on mandolin.

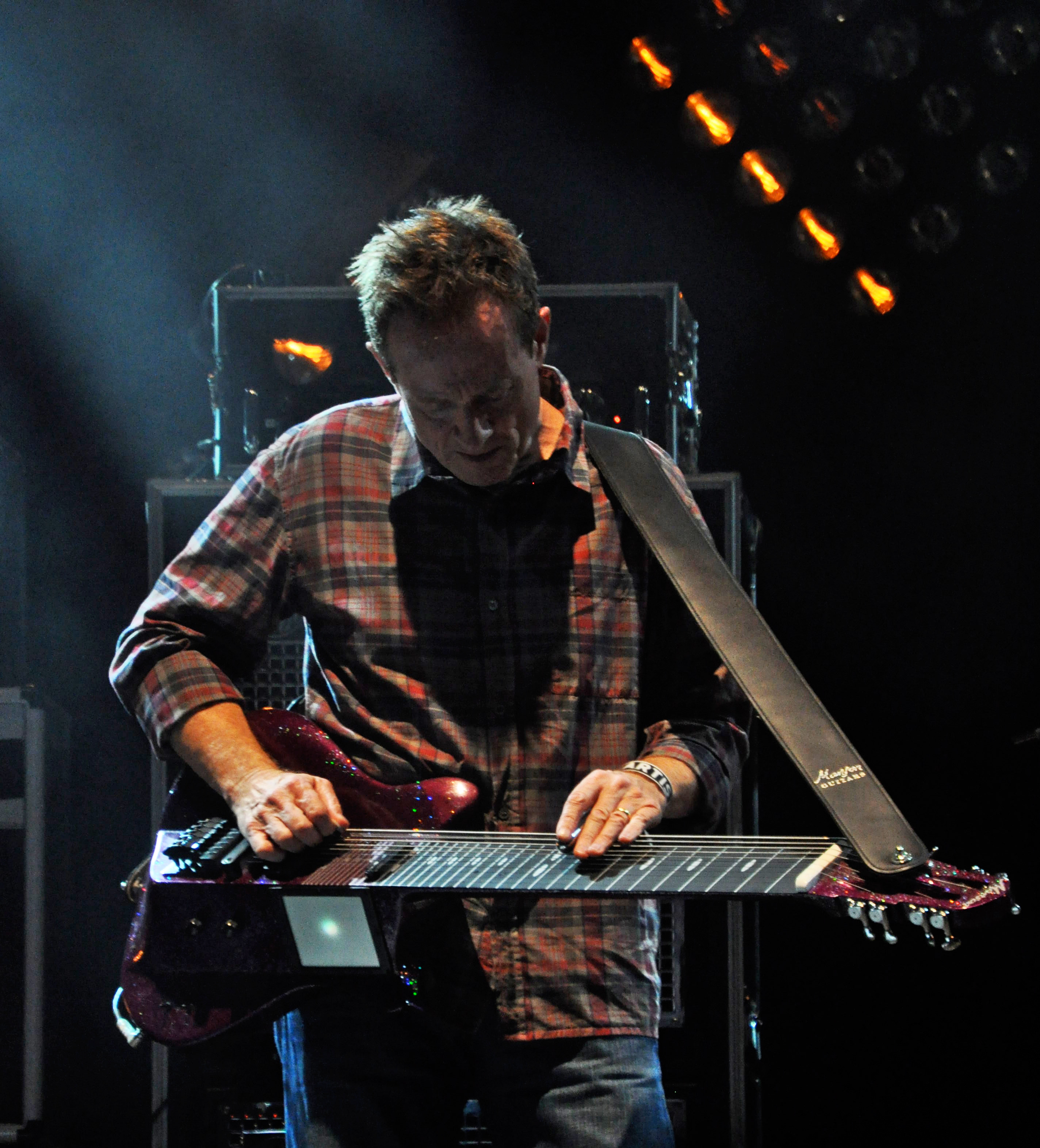
Jones playing a lap steel on stage, 2009

He played at Bonnaroo 2007 in a collaboration with Ben Harper and the Roots' drummer Questlove as part of the festival's all-star Super-Jam, which is the festival's annual tradition of bringing together famous, world-class musicians to jam on stage for a few hours. Jones appeared and played mandolin with Gillian Welch during the festival during the song "Look at Miss Ohio" and a cover of the Johnny Cash song "Jackson". He also appeared during the set of Ben Harper & the Innocent Criminals where they played a cover of "Dazed and Confused". Jones then closed Gov't Mule's first set, playing part of "Moby Dick" and then "Livin Lovin Maid" on bass, then proceeded to play keyboards on the songs "Since I've Been Loving You" and "No Quarter". Jones also performed on mandolin with the all-female bluegrass group Uncle Earl, whose album he had produced in 2007.

Mandolin-slinging Jones jammed on Led Zeppelin's "Whole Lotta Love" with Winnipeg's energetic Duhks at April 2007's MerleFest in North Carolina.

Jones played in the Led Zeppelin reunion show at London's O2 Arena on 10 December 2007 with the other remaining members of Led Zeppelin as part of a tribute to Ahmet Ertegun.

In 2008, Jones produced Nickel Creek singer-fiddler Sara Watkins' debut solo album. As previously mentioned, Jones toured with Watkins, Glen Phillips, and the rest of Nickel Creek in late 2004 in a collaboration entitled Mutual Admiration Society.

On 10 February 2008, Jones appeared with the Foo Fighters on the Grammy Awards conducting the orchestral part to the song "The Pretender". On 7 June 2008, Jones and Jimmy Page appeared with the Foo Fighters to close out the band's concert at Wembley Stadium. Jones performed with Sonic Youth and Takehisa Kosugi, providing the stage music for Merce Cunningham's Nearly 90, which ran 16–19 April 2009 at the Brooklyn Academy of Music.

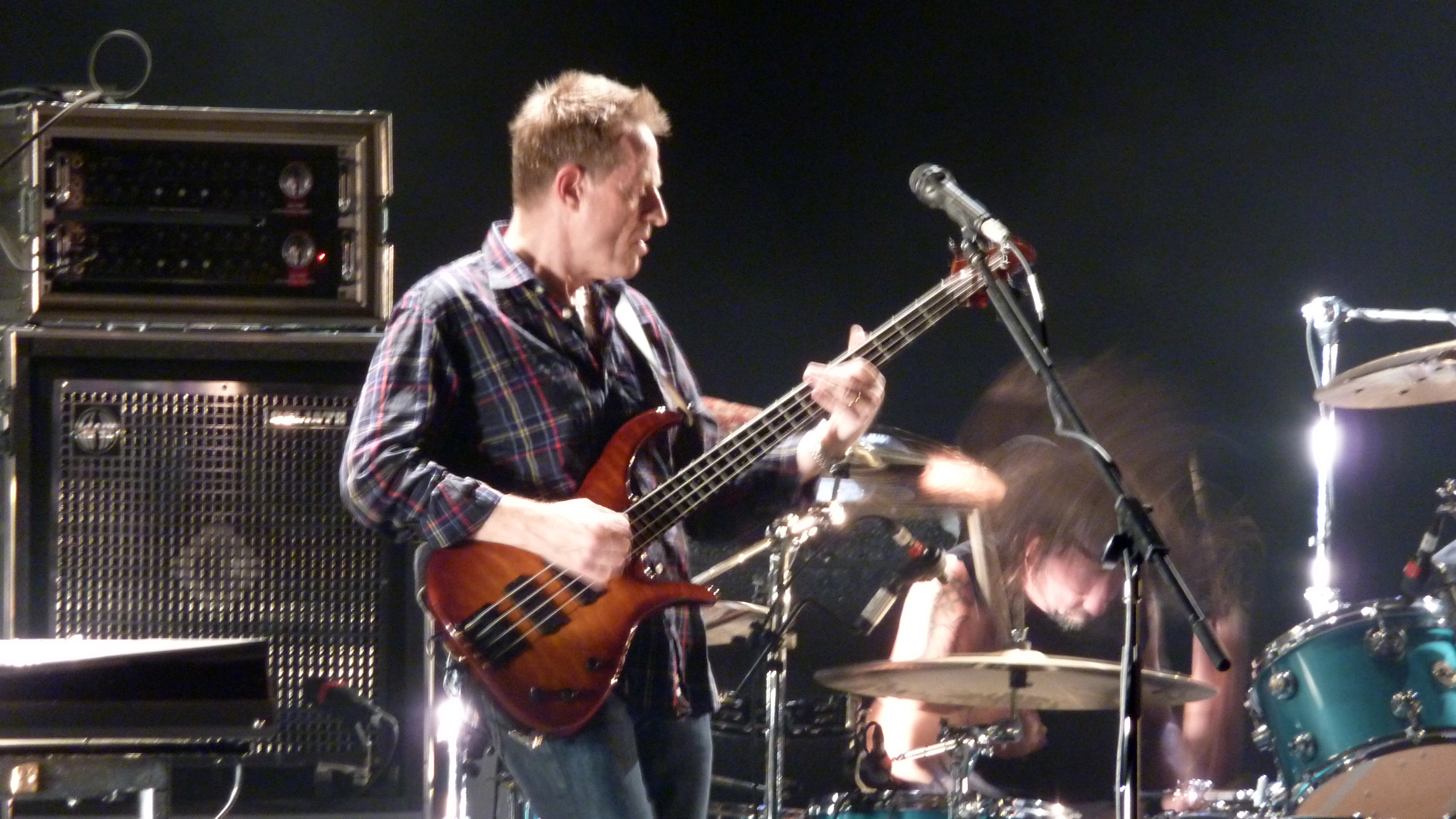
Jones playing bass in Them Crooked Vultures, 2009

In 2009–2010 he was part of a supergroup with Dave Grohl and Queens of the Stone Age frontman Josh Homme named Them Crooked Vultures. The trio played their first show together on 9 August 2009 at the Metro in Chicago, and their first album was released on 17 November 2009.

In February and March 2011, he appeared in the onstage band in Mark-Anthony Turnage's opera Anna Nicole, about the Playboy model Anna Nicole Smith, at the Royal Opera House, Covent Garden, in London. In August 2011, he appeared at Reading and Leeds Festivals to play alongside Seasick Steve. On 16 September 2012, Jones appeared at the Sunflower Jam charity concert at the Royal Albert Hall, London, performing alongside guitarist Brian May of Queen, drummer Ian Paice of Deep Purple, and vocalists Bruce Dickinson of Iron Maiden and Alice Cooper.

In November 2012, Jones toured the UK with the Norwegian avant-garde/improvisational band Supersilent. On 6 December 2012, Jones performed on bass, guitar and mandolin with Robyn Hitchcock as 'Biscotti' at Cecil Sharp House, London. On 30 April 2013, Jones appeared live on the BBC TV Show Later... with Jools Holland, playing bass for Seasick Steve on "Down on the Farm" from Seasick Steve's new album Hubcap Music. On 1 May 2013, Jones appeared with Seasick Steve at a concert at the Roundhouse in Camden, London. Introduced by Seasick Steve as a member "of the best rock band ever", Jones played bass, mandolin, and steel guitar, and provided vocals.

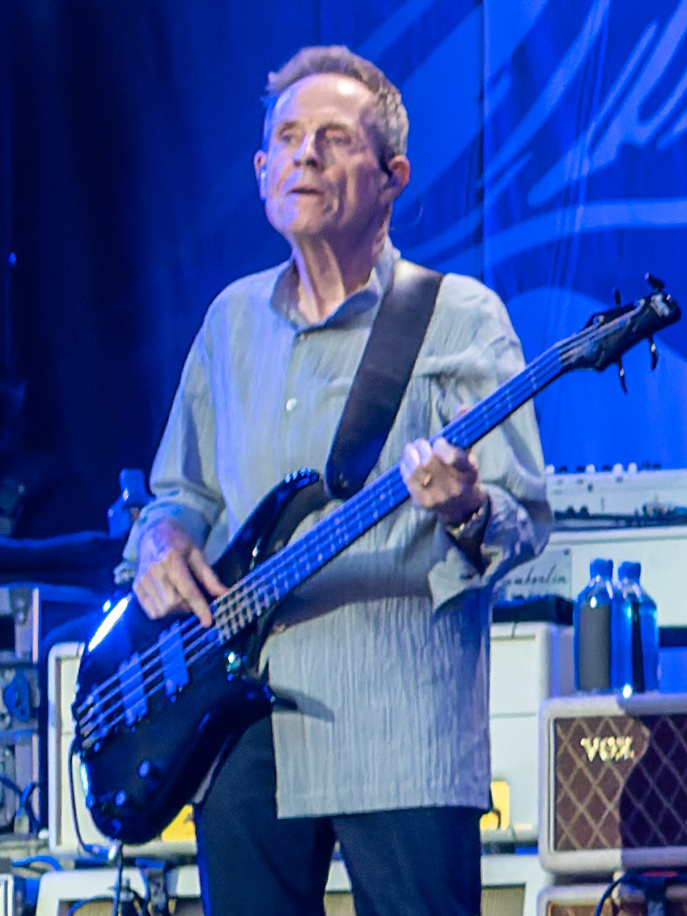
Jones in 2022

On Saturday 29 June 2013, Jones played guitar whilst appearing with Rokia Traoré, who opened the Pyramid Stage that morning at Glastonbury 2013. He also supported Seasick Steve on the West Holt's stage at the same festival. During November 2013, Jones joined a seven-day tour of the Southeast US, playing mandolin with the Dave Rawlings Machine. The Atlanta show (21 November 2013) included a rendition Led Zeppelin's "Going to California." Jones also toured with the Dave Rawlings Machine in autumn 2014. On 5 and 6 September 2015, Jones, along with Queen drummer Roger Taylor, joined Foo Fighters on stage in Milton Keynes to perform a cover of Queen's "Under Pressure," with Taylor Hawkins and Dave Grohl singing. Stepping outside his normal genre, he composed three lute songs for the 2015 album Amores Pasados by John Potter, Anna Maria Friman, Ariel Abramovich and Jacob Herringman.

In 2017, Jones formed a trio, the "Tres Coyotes" with the Finnish composer, Magnus Lindberg and the Finnish cellist, Anssi Karttunen, they have performed in Helsinki (Savoy Theatre 2017), Torino (Torino Jazz Festival 2019) and Strasbourg (Festival Musica 2022). In 2019 he formed a duo, called the "Sons of Chipotle" with Anssi Karttunen. The group premiered with a tour in Asia in Seoul at Place Vib and in Tokyo at the Pit Inn in Tokyo, Japan in September of that year. For the Tokyo shows they were joined by musicians Jim O'Rourke and Otomo Yoshihide The band's first scheduled US date at the Big Ears Festival in Knoxville, Tennessee was cancelled in March 2020, due to the COVID-19 outbreak and finally took place at the Big Ears in 2024.

In 2025, Jones appeared in the musical documentary Becoming Led Zeppelin, directed by Bernard MacMahon and produced by Allison McGourty. It was the first time the band's members had agreed to participate in a biographical documentary.

== Legacy ==
Jones is widely considered to be one of the most highly influential and important bassists, keyboard players and arrangers in the history of rock music. Many notable rock bassists have been influenced by Jones, including John Deacon of Queen, Tom Hamilton of Aerosmith, Geddy Lee of Rush, Steve Harris of Iron Maiden, Flea of Red Hot Chili Peppers, Gene Simmons of Kiss, and Krist Novoselic of Nirvana. Chris Dreja, the rhythm guitarist and bassist of the Yardbirds, has described him as "the best bass player in Europe". Music publications and magazines have ranked Jones among the best rock bassists of all time. He was named the best bassist on Creem Magazine's 1977 Reader Poll. In 2000, Guitar magazine ranked him third in the "Bassist of the Millennium" readers' poll. Rolling Stone magazine ranked him number 14 on its list of the "50 Greatest Bassists of All Time" in 2020.

In October 2010, Jones was awarded a "Gold Badge Award" by The British Academy of Songwriters, Composers and Authors for his outstanding contribution to Britain's music and entertainment industry. On 10 November 2010, he was honoured with the "Outstanding Contribution Award" at the Marshall Classic Rock Roll of Honour Awards. In 2014, Jones ranked first on Paste magazine's list of "20 Most Underrated Bassists."

== Personal life ==
Jones married Maureen Hegarty in the spring of 1966; they reside in west London. They have three daughters. According to The Sunday Times Rich List 2009, Jones's net worth was £40 million.

== Discography ==
=== Solo ===
==== Studio albums ====
- The Sporting Life (1994) with Diamanda Galás
- Zooma (1999)
- The Thunderthief (2001)

==== Soundtrack albums ====
- Scream for Help (1985)

=== with various artists ===
- No Introduction Necessary (1968)

=== with Led Zeppelin ===
- Led Zeppelin (1969)
- Led Zeppelin II (1969)
- Led Zeppelin III (1970)
- Led Zeppelin IV (1971)
- Houses of the Holy (1973)
- Physical Graffiti (1975)
- Presence (1976)
- In Through the Out Door (1979)
- Coda (1982)

=== with Them Crooked Vultures ===
- Them Crooked Vultures (2009)

== Session and production work ==
=== with Donovan ===
- Mellow Yellow (1966)

=== with Yardbirds ===
- Little Games (1967)

=== with the Rolling Stones ===
- Their Satanic Majesties Request (1967)

=== with Billy Nicholls ===
- Would You Believe (1968)

=== with The Mission ===
- Children (1988)

=== with R.E.M. ===
- Automatic For The People (1992)

=== with Butthole Surfers ===
- Independent Worm Saloon (1993)

=== with Heart ===
- The Road Home (1995)

=== with Seasick Steve ===
- You Can't Teach an Old Dog New Tricks (2011)
- Hubcap Music (2013)

== Filmography ==
- Mrs. Brown, You've Got a Lovely Daughter (1968) – music arranger: songs
- The Song Remains the Same (1976)
- Give My Regards to Broad Street (1984)
- Scream for Help (1984) – composer
- The Secret Adventures of Tom Thumb (1993) – composer
- Risk (1994) – composer
- Celebration Day (2012)
