= Laura Moriarty (writer, born 1970) =

American novelist (born 1970)

- Born: December 24, 1970 (age 55); Honolulu, Hawaii, U.S.
- Education: University of Kansas (MA)
- Occupation: Novelist
- Children: 1
- Website: www.lauramoriartynovels.com

Laura Moriarty (born December 24, 1970, Honolulu, Hawaii) is an American novelist.

== Early life and education ==
Moriarty was born in Honolulu in 1970. She earned a degree in social work before earning an M.A. in Creative Writing at the University of Kansas. She was the recipient of the George Bennett Fellowship for Creative Writing at Phillips Exeter Academy in New Hampshire.

== Career ==
According to Moriarty, her debut novel (The Center Of Everything), described as "a warm, beguiling book full of hard-won wisdom" by The New York Times, was deeply influenced by a reading of Carl Sagan's The Demon-Haunted World. Other writers who have had a deep influence on Moriarty include Margaret Atwood, Tobias Wolff, and Jane Hamilton. Her favorite short story writer is Lorrie Moore.

Moriarty's novel The Chaperone was adapted by Julian Fellowes into the 2018 film The Chaperone starring Elizabeth McGovern, Haley Lu Richardson, and Blythe Danner.

=== Kirkus controversy ===
In 2017, Kirkus Reviews removed its starred review of Moriarty's novel American Heart on account of the book's "white point of view" and "public concern" about the novel's alleged "white savior narrative", as described by editor-in-chief Claiborne Smith in interviews with Vulture and NPR. The reviewer, a Muslim woman with expertise in young adult fiction, rewrote her text, adding that the story is "told exclusively through the filter of a white protagonist about a Muslim character," while the magazine removed the star. Moriarty commented that "the takeaway [from this episode] for white writers is don't even try to write about people who are different from you."

== Selected publications ==
- The Center of Everything. Hyperion, 2004 ISBN 978-0544340695
- The Rest of Her Life. Hyperion, 2007 ISBN 978-1401302719
- While I'm Falling. Hyperion, 2009 ISBN 978-0141031545
- The Chaperone. Penguin, 2012 ISBN 978-1594631436
- American Heart. HarperCollins, 2017 ISBN 978-0062694102
- Sunlight Finds You. Riverhead Books, 2026 ISBN 978-1594487170
