= William Montgomery McGovern =

American archaeologist (1897-1964)

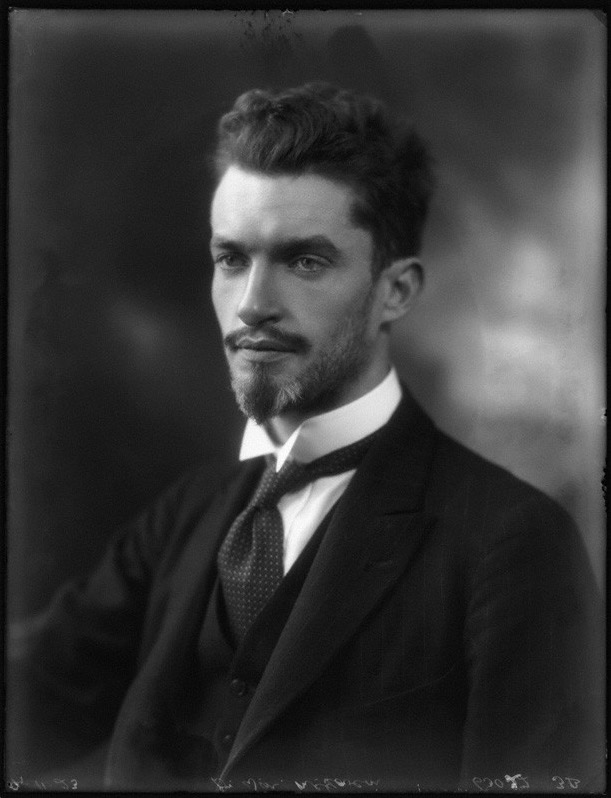
- William Montgomery McGovern in 1923
- Born: September 28, 1897; New York City, U.S.
- Died: December 12, 1964 (aged 67); Evanston, Illinois, U.S.
- Occupations: Professor; Archaeologist; Adventurer
- Spouse: Margaret Montgomery
- Writing career
- Genre: Non-fiction
- Notable works: Colloquial Japanese; To Lhasa in Disguise; Jungle Paths and Inca Ruins; From Luther to Hitler: The History of Fascist-Nazi Political Philosophy

William Montgomery McGovern (September 28, 1897 – December 12, 1964) was an American adventurer, political scientist, Northwestern University professor, anthropologist and journalist. He was a possible inspiration for the character of Indiana Jones.

By age 30, McGovern had explored the Amazon and braved uncharted regions of the Himalayas, survived revolution in Mexico, studied at Oxford University and the Sorbonne, and become a Buddhist priest in a Japanese monastery. He was also a lecturer, war correspondent and military strategist.

== Biography ==
=== Early life ===
McGovern was born in Manhattan, New York, on September 28, 1897, the son of Janet Blair (née Montgomery) and Felix Daniel McGovern, an army officer. Time reported that he began to travel at the age of six weeks, once visiting Mexico with his mother "just to see a revolution."

His formative years were spent in Asia. McGovern graduated with the degree of soro, or Doctor of Divinity, from the Buddhist monastery of Nishi Honganji in Kyoto, Japan at age 20 before going on to study at the Sorbonne and University of Berlin. He received his D.Phil. from Christ Church, Oxford in 1922—working his way through school by teaching Chinese at SOAS, University of London.

=== Exploration ===
Shortly after graduation he began his first great expedition, to the remote mountain kingdom of Tibet. In his book To Lhasa in Disguise, McGovern claims he had to sneak into the country disguised as a local porter. As Time reported in 1938:

With a few Tibetan servants, he climbed through the wild, snowy passes of the Himalayas. There, in the bitter cold, he stood naked while a companion covered his body with brown stain, squirted lemon juice into his blue eyes to darken them. Thus disguised as a coolie, he arrived in the Forbidden City without being detected, but disclosed himself to the civilian officials. A fanatical mob led by Buddhist monks stoned his house. Bill McGovern slipped out through a back door and joined the mob in throwing stones. The civil government took him into protective custody, finally sent him back to India with an escort.

Another expedition to Peru and the Amazon would follow a few years later, resulting in another book, Jungle Paths and Inca Ruins.

=== Wartime activities ===
==== Second Sino-Japanese War ====
In 1937, McGovern was named Far East correspondent by the Chicago Times, arriving in Tokyo with Thomas C. Quackenboss, a family friend and former student of McGovern's at Northwestern, as war began with China. Both men set off for Manchukuo to cover the invasion, only to see Thomas C. Quackenboss thrown into jail for taking photos in the streets. They went on to spend long stints on the front.

==== World War II ====
When the United States joined what had become World War II, McGovern joined the United States Naval Reserve, serving from 1941 to 1945. At Guadalcanal, he operated behind enemy lines, using his knowledge of Japanese to taunt enemy soldiers and interrogate captives. In the closing days of the war he served in the European Theatre, crossing the Rhine with General Patton.

His most important job was not martial in nature however. Throughout the war he would rise at 5:30 AM to prepare a top-secret newspaper on enemy capabilities and intentions. This paper was considered required breakfast reading for President Roosevelt and the Joint Chiefs.

=== Academic career ===
At age 30, McGovern became assistant curator of the anthropology department at Chicago's Field Museum of Natural History. Two years later, he was appointed a professor of Political Science at Northwestern University, a position he would hold for the rest of his life. As Professor of Far Eastern Studies his classes were perpetually oversubscribed, given his eminence and popularity. His lectures were never dull and frequently peppered with anecdotes from his time in the far east, particularly in Tibet and Japan. He insisted that his pupils learn at least one or two kanji characters a week as he carefully illustrated them on a large chalkboard at the front of the lecture hall and explained their meanings as he drew them. His students considered themselves fortunate to have landed a spot in one of his classes. His son, William M. McGovern Jr., followed him into academia teaching law at Northwestern University School of Law in the early 1960s.

Between his time as a war correspondent during the Sino-Japanese War and the entry of the United States into World War II, McGovern lectured on government at Harvard University. In 1941, he published From Luther to Hitler: The History of Fascist-Nazi Political Philosophy. During the postwar years, McGovern lectured on military intelligence and strategy at the Naval, Air and Army War Colleges.

Reputed to speak 12 languages and deaf in one ear, McGovern was an academic celebrity known for outlandish foreign dress and holding court in Northwestern's University Club.

=== Death ===
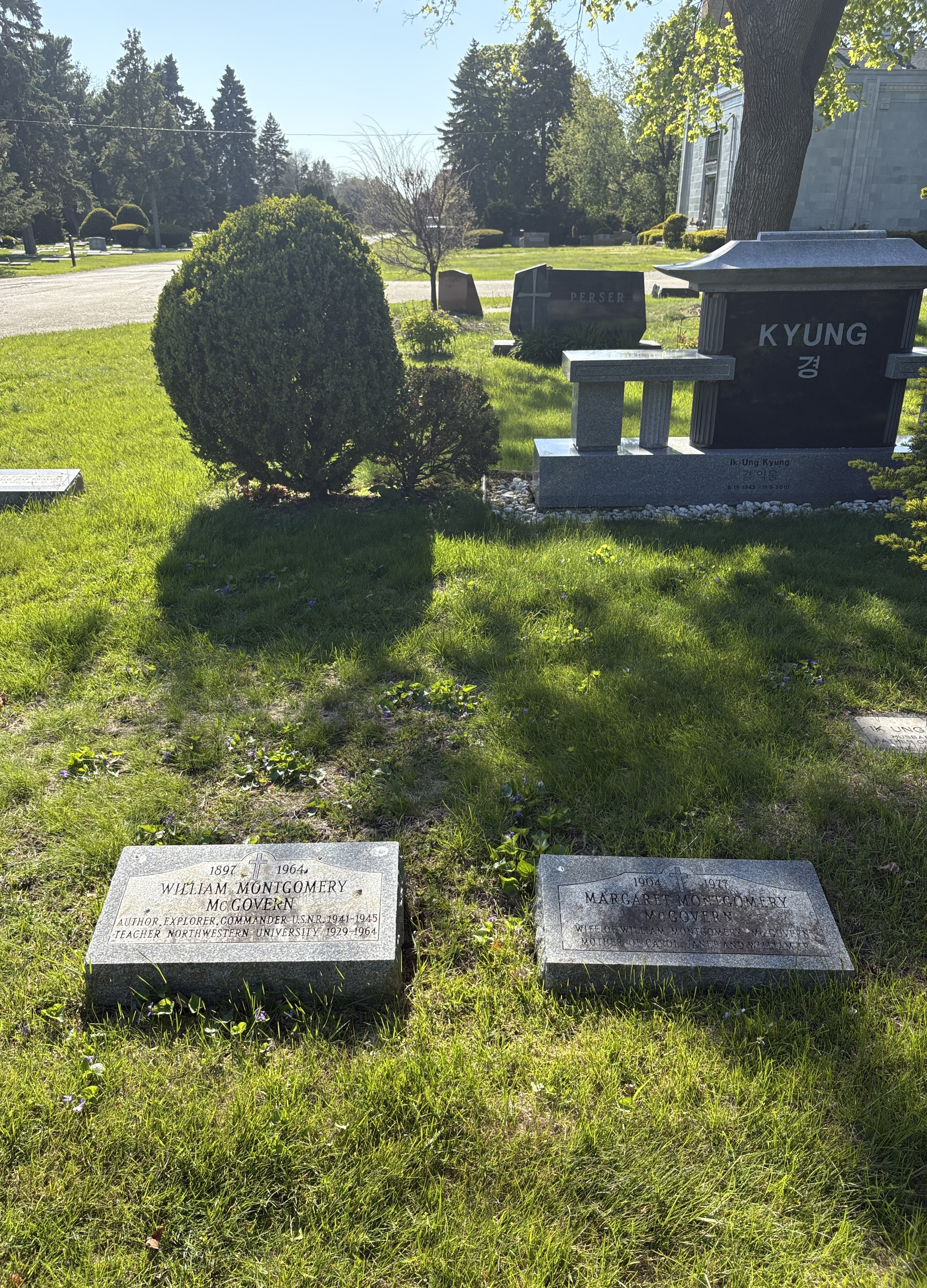
McGovern's grave at Memorial Park Cemetery

McGovern died after a long illness in Evanston at age 67 on December 12, 1964. He was buried at Memorial Park Cemetery in Skokie.

=== Descendants ===
McGovern married his second cousin, Margaret Montgomery, and with her had four children—three daughters and a son.

Actress Elizabeth McGovern is his granddaughter. University of Washington mathematics professor William Monty McGovern is his grandson.

== Criticism ==
McGovern's work on Asian history, in particular his interpretations of Chinese classical sources, was criticized by a reviewer in the journal American Anthropologist: "Dr. McGovern has converted this dry and perplexing source material into a racy and jocular chronicle where fact and fancy are so thoroughly mixed that a general reader could not possibly differentiate them. Furthermore, there are numerous generalizations and speculations not justified by the sources." His book From Luther to Hitler was criticized by a reviewer in the American Political Science Review: "Failure to distinguish clearly between basic assumptions and the doctrines deduced from them enables [him] to suggest a degree of continuity which dissolves upon closer examination."

== Works ==
- Modern Japan - its political, military, and industrial organisation, 1920
- An Introduction to Mahayana Buddhism, 1922
- A Manual of Buddhist Philosophy, vol. 1, 1923
- To Lhasa in disguise, a secret expedition through mysterious Tibet, 1924
- Jungle Paths and Inca Ruins - the record of an expedition, 1927
- The Early Empires of Central Asia, 1939
- McGovern, William Montgomery (January 1, 1941). From Luther to Hitler: The History of Fascist-Nazi Political Philosophy (1st ed.). Houghton Mifflin.
- Radicals and conservatives, 1957
- Strategic intelligence and the shape of tomorrow, 1961
