= Psalm (Terl Bryant album) =

Studio album by Terl Bryant
- Released: 1995
- Genre: Progressive rock, Christian rock
- Length: 56:38
- Label: Alliance Records
- Producer: Terl Bryant

Terl Bryant chronology
Psalm (1995)	Beauty...As Far as the Eye Can See (1997)

Psalm is an album by ex-Iona drummer Terl Bryant released in 1995.

== Track listing ==
Total Time (56:38)

1. "The Lord Reigns" 5:07
2. "Christ Be in Me" 4:23
3. "Here is Love" 5:07
4. "Israel" 4:37
5. "My Song is Love Unknown" 4;50
6. "Come Holy Ghost" 3:19
7. "Do Not Fear" 7:12
8. "Miriam" 5:57
9. "The King of Love" 3:16
10. "The Battle Prayer" 6:15
11. "God Be in My Head" 6:21

== Personnel ==
- Terl Bryant – drums, percussion
- Juliet Bryant – backing vocals
- Dave Bainbridge – keyboards, guitar
- Peter Bonas – guitar, bass
- Dave Clifton – vocals, guitar
- Andy Coughlan – bass
- Phil Crabbe – percussion
- Troy Donockley – pipes, whistles
- Mark Edwards – keyboards
- Stuart Garrard – vocals, guitar
- Charlie Groves & Ali Groves – vocals, violin
- Pat Gruber – bass
- Mike Haughton – saxophone
- Joanne Hogg – vocals
- Tim Harries – bass
- Alex Legg – vocals
- Mike Parlett – saxophone
- Ben Okafor – vocals, percussion
- Nicole Riordan – backing vocals
- Mike Sturgis – percussion

== Production ==
- Produced by Terl Bryant
- Recorded by Neil Costello at The Soundfield, Derby, UK, 1995
- Mixed by Nigel Palmer
- Mastered at Abbey Road Studios
- Executive Producer James Sanderson

== Release details ==
- 1995, UK, Alliance Records ALD036, CD
- 1995, UK, Alliance Records ALC036, Cassette
