= Thursday the 12th =

British television series

- Genre: Crime drama
- Written by: Paula Milne
- Directed by: Charles Beeson
- Starring: Ciarán Hinds; Maria Doyle Kennedy; Elizabeth McGovern; Jim Sturgess; Gillian Bevan; Trevor Byfield; Peter Vaughan; Hugh Bonneville
- Theme music composer: Peter Salem
- Country of origin: United Kingdom
- Original language: English
- No. of series: 1
- No. of episodes: 4

Production
- Executive producer: Claudia Milne
- Producer: Emma Burge
- Cinematography: Fred Tammes
- Editor: David Blackmore
- Running time: 50 minutes
- Production companies: Strand Productions; Twenty Twenty Television

Original release
- Network: ITV

Thursday the 12th is a four-part British television crime drama series, written by Paula Milne and directed by Charles Beeson. It has been screened internationally and shown in the United Kingdom at the British Film Institute, but has never been shown on British television. It was initially due to premiere on ITV1 in May 2000, but due to its political themes and proximity to that year's local elections, it was delayed due to concerns it would violate laws regarding political neutrality during election periods; efforts to broadcast it in June 2001 were cancelled for similar reasons, due to that year's general election.

The series focuses on the Bannister family, whose lives are turned upside down when an unidentified body is found in the grounds of their estate. As an investigative TV reporter takes on the case, Marius Bannister (Ciarán Hinds), a wealthy dentist and politician, his wife Nina (Maria Doyle Kennedy), their troubled adopted teenaged son Martin (Jim Sturgess), and Nina's predatory sister Candice Hopper (Elizabeth McGovern) all come under suspicion.

== Broadcast ==
The series was originally set to broadcast as two feature-length episodes, but due to local elections taking place on the day the first episode was due to be broadcast, 4 May 2000, the series was pulled from the schedules at the last minute, on the grounds that it may be in breach of rules on political bias. Although it was later rescheduled for broadcast in the winter of 2000/2001, the series was once again pushed back, and was set to premiere in June 2001, although due to the foot-and-mouth outbreak of 2001, the general election due to take place in May was put back to 7 June, and the series was subsequently pulled from the schedules once more, with no further attempts to reschedule it. The series was shown as part of a season showcasing Paula Milne's work at the BFI in London on 14 September 2012.

For international broadcast and release on DVD, the series was re-edited into four episodes, each focusing on the story of a single character. In the United States, the series premiered on Bravo on 4 June 2003. The series was also broadcast in Australia on UKTV. The series was released on Region 1 DVD on 25 September 2007.

== Cast ==
- Ciarán Hinds as Marius Bannister
- Maria Doyle Kennedy as Nina Bannister
- Elizabeth McGovern as Candice Hopper
- Jim Sturgess as Martin Bannister
- Gillian Bevan as Marilyn Forbes
- Trevor Byfield as Frank Ely
- Peter Vaughan Edgar Bannister
- Hugh Bonneville as Brin Hopper
- Jon Glover as Julian Glover
- Christopher James as Hugo Schindler
- Robert Murray as David Skinner
- Morgan Sass as Daisy Bannister
- Ralph Ineson as Collins
- Vincent Franklin as Hewitt
- Ron Cook as Liam Donnelly
- Robin Houston as the Newscaster
