= The Chaperone (2018 film) =

2018 film directed by Michael Engler

- Theatrical release poster
- Directed by: Michael Engler
- Written by: Julian Fellowes
- Produced by: Kelly Carmichael; Greg Clark; Rose Ganguzza; Victoria Hill; Elizabeth McGovern; Luca Scalisi
- Starring: Haley Lu Richardson; Miranda Otto; Elizabeth McGovern; Blythe Danner; Campbell Scott; Géza Röhrig; Victoria Hill
- Cinematography: Nick Remy Matthews
- Edited by: Sofía Subercaseaux
- Music by: Marcelo Zarvos
- Production companies: Fibonacci Films; 39 Steps; Anonymous Content; Rose Pictures; Masterpiece; Hamilton Entertainment
- Distributed by: PBS Distribution
- Release dates: September 23, 2018 (LAFF); March 29, 2019 (United States)
- Running time: 103 minutes
- Country: United States
- Language: English
- Box office: $1.5 million

The Chaperone is a 2018 period drama film, directed by Michael Engler, with a screenplay by Julian Fellowes, from the novel by Laura Moriarty. It stars Elizabeth McGovern, Haley Lu Richardson, Miranda Otto, Blythe Danner, Campbell Scott, Géza Röhrig, and Victoria Hill.

It had its world premiere at the Los Angeles Film Festival on September 23, 2018. It was released on March 29, 2019, by PBS Distribution.

== Plot ==
In 1922 teen Louise Brooks, invited to study dance at the NYC Denishawn school, must go with a chaperone. Fellow Wichita, Kansas resident, middle-aged Norma Carlisle, volunteers after watching her recital.

Norma's husband is wary, but their sons support her. At the rail station, the couple have a strained goodbye. Louise's father emphasizes her stay in NYC depends on Norma.

On the journey, Louise questions everything, while Norma conforms. Norma dreams about her childhood ride from NYC to her adoptive Kansas family. Waking alone, she finds Louise dining with a young man and his uncle. Discussing prohibition, Norma is alone in supporting it.

Later, Norma reminds Louise to never be with men unaccompanied, as men only marry 'untouched' women, which Louise sees as extremely antiquated. As Norma's adoptive parents died when she was a teen, she married young. Louise senses Norma's unhappiness, which she denies.

In NYC, Louise loves the noise and bustle, but Norma is uncomfortable. Although the younger wants to explore, the other insists they stay in, as class starts early. After walking Louise to class, Norma meets Floyd, a Columbia student who works there. When she asks about a 15th Street address, he warns her the area is dangerous.

Denishawn school dancers are reminded to not drink or smoke and always come across as pure and untarnished. Meanwhile, Norma, seeking her birth mother's contact, finds her old nun-run orphanage, but is turned away. Another flashback reveals Mr. Carlisle's infidelity.

After Louise becomes the lead, Norma finds her flirting with Floyd in the diner. When the older woman complains of her corset, Louise proclaims she will never wear one. Norma follows Louise's example, flirting with the orphanage's handyman Joseph Schmidt to access her file. Over tea, he explains his brief imprisonment after WWI caused him to lose custody of his daughter Greta when her mother died. Broke, Joseph works there to stay close. He lets Norma into the office one day while everyone is at mass.

Norma finds a letter from Mary O'Dell in her file with a MA address, requesting updates of her daughter. Thankful, she offers to pay Joseph, but he refuses. Louise notices Norma's good mood, who says she is writing an old friend to visit.

Denishawn teacher Ted often singles Louise out, as he sees her potential. His partner and wife Ms. St. Denis suggests he curb his enthusiasm.

A theatre outing opens Norma's eyes, as the audience is not segregated. They both leave enthralled. Norma now sees NYC differently; now accustomed to the hustle and bustle, she suspects in comparison Wichita will seem dull. She apologizes for her previous attitude, explaining she married her lawyer Mr. Carlisle when she was re-orphaned at 16.

Norma finds Louise's very negative postcard about her, but sees no point in yelling. Another flashback reveals her husband had married her to stifle his homosexuality, but was unsuccessful. Norma threw him out.

Joseph is pleased Norma meets him in Central Park to help find her roots. She gets a letter from her mother Mary while Louise is performing in Philadelphia. Excited, Norma meets her, however Mary is uninterested in having further contact.

After Philly, Louise is considered for Denishawn's dance troupe, which includes living in a boarding house. Miss Ruth reminds Norma the offer is contingent upon Denishawn's positive aesthetic code.

Louise goes out celebrating with Floyd, so Norma and Joseph seek her out. The drunk dancer vomits, then reveals an older Wichita man took her virginity. Hungover in the morning, Louise wants to call in sick, but Norma insists she go. When Floyd expresses remorse, Norma suggests he forget Louise.

In another flashback, Mr. Carlisle explains that if they divorced due to his homosexuality, he would be murdered and she humiliated. After Louise stays the night with Joseph at the orphanage, a nun sees her leave. Joseph and Greta appear at the apartment. Since Louise is moving into the boarding house and Norma is returning to Wichita, she proposes they accompany her, as if Joseph were her brother.

In Wichita 20 years later, Norma finds Louise hiding at her parents' as her career has tanked. Thanking her for her past help, she gives her $100 to start over in NYC. Louise eventually reinvents herself, becoming a best-selling writer. Two of her silent films can still be found today.

== Cast ==
- Elizabeth McGovern as Norma (The Chaperone)
- Haley Lu Richardson as Louise Brooks
- Miranda Otto as Ruth St. Denis
- Blythe Danner as Mary O'Dell
- Campbell Scott as Alan Carlisle
- Géza Röhrig as Joseph
- Victoria Hill as Myra Brooks
- Matt McGrath as Raymond
- Robert Fairchild as Ted Shawn
- Tyler Weaks as Howard Carlisle
- Kate Grimes as Ms. Burton
- Andrew Burnap as Floyd
- Bill Hoag as Jack
- Ellen Toland as Greta
- George Hampe as Earl Carlisle
- Sean Hudock as Norman Ross
- Vinson German as Music Hall Man
- Becky Ann Baker as Lois

== Production ==
In February 2013, it was announced Elizabeth McGovern would star in the film, with Simon Curtis directing from a screenplay by Julian Fellowes, based upon the novel by Laura Moriarty, with McGovern, Curtis, Eli Selden, and Adam Shulman producing under their Anonymous Content banner. Fox Searchlight Pictures would distribute the film. In May 2017, it was announced Michael Engler would direct the film, instead of Curtis, who remained as executive producer on the film. Masterpiece, Altus Media, and Rose Pictures produced the film, with PBS Distribution distributing it. The film received a theatrical release prior to airing on PBS. Victoria Hill, Greg Clark, Luca Scalisi, Rose Ganguzza, Kelly Carmichael, and Gary Hamilton also served as producers on the film.

=== Filming ===
Principal photography began in August 2017.

== Release ==
The film had its world premiere at the Los Angeles Film Festival on September 23, 2018. It was released on March 29, 2019. On PBS, the film premiered on November 24, 2019 (part of Masterpiece Classic).

== Critical reception ==
The Chaperone holds a 47% approval rating on review aggregator website Rotten Tomatoes, based on 58 reviews, with an average of 5.7/10. The site's critical consensus reads, "The Chaperone is inspired by a potentially interesting real-life story, but loses its sharpest and timeliest angles in the telling." On Metacritic, the film holds a rating of 48 out of 100, based on 14 critics, indicating "mixed or average reviews". Other reviews were more favorable. Film International stated "The Chaperone’s heart is in the right place. It is an enjoyable, glossy excursion into 1920s America which touches on the personalities and issues of the time."
