= Zooma =

Album by John Paul Jones

Studio album by John Paul Jones
- Released: 6 September 1999
- Recorded: The Malthouse, London; Skip Saylor Studio, Los Angeles; Pedernales Studios, Spicewood, Texas; AIR Studios, London
- Genre: Instrumental rock, progressive rock, hard rock, blues rock, heavy metal
- Length: 47:42
- Label: Discipline Global Mobile
- Producer: John Paul Jones

John Paul Jones chronology
The Sporting Life (1994)	Zooma (1999)	The Thunderthief (2001)

Zooma is the 1999 debut solo album by English musician John Paul Jones, best known as the bassist and keyboardist of Led Zeppelin. The album consists of rhythmically focused instrumentals, highlighting Jones’ aggressive bass guitar and lap steel guitar playing.

== Track listing ==
All tracks written, composed, and arranged by John Paul Jones.

No.	Title	Length
1.	"Zooma"	5:52
2.	"Grind"	5:20
3.	"The Smile of Your Shadow"	5:50
4.	"Goose"	4:58
5.	"Bass 'n' Drums"	2:32
6.	"B. Fingers"	5:26
7.	"Snake Eyes"	7:32
8.	"Nosumi Blues"	5:48
9.	"Tidal"	4:20
10.	"Fanfare for the Millennium" (bonus track for Japanese releases)	1:02

== Critical reception ==
Professional ratings
Review scores
Source	Rating
AllMusic	4/5 stars
Rolling Stone	3/5 stars

The album received positive reviews from AllMusic and Rolling Stone.

== Personnel ==
Adapted from the Zooma liner notes, the recording personnel was as follows:

- John Paul Jones – 10 string bass (1, 4, 6, 9); 12 string bass (2, 3); 4 string bass (5, 7, 8); electric mandola (1); Kyma (1, 2, 4, 7, 9); spoken word (2); mandola (3); bass lap steel (3, 4, 7, 8, 9, 10); guitars (6); organ solo (7); string arrangement and conducting (7)
- Pete Thomas – drums (1, 2, 4, 6, 7, 8, 9)
- Paul Leary – guitar solo (1)
- Trey Gunn – touch guitar solo (2, 6)
- Mo Jones – spoken word (2)
- Denny Fongheiser – djembe (3); drums (5)
- London Symphony Orchestra – strings (7)

The technical personnel was as follows:

- Stuart Sullivan – recording engineer
- Richard Evans – recording engineer
- Brian Foraker – recording engineer
- Geoff Foster – recording engineer
- Akio Morishima – design
- Amy & Tanveer – photography
