= Sadie and the Hotheads =

English European-Americana music group

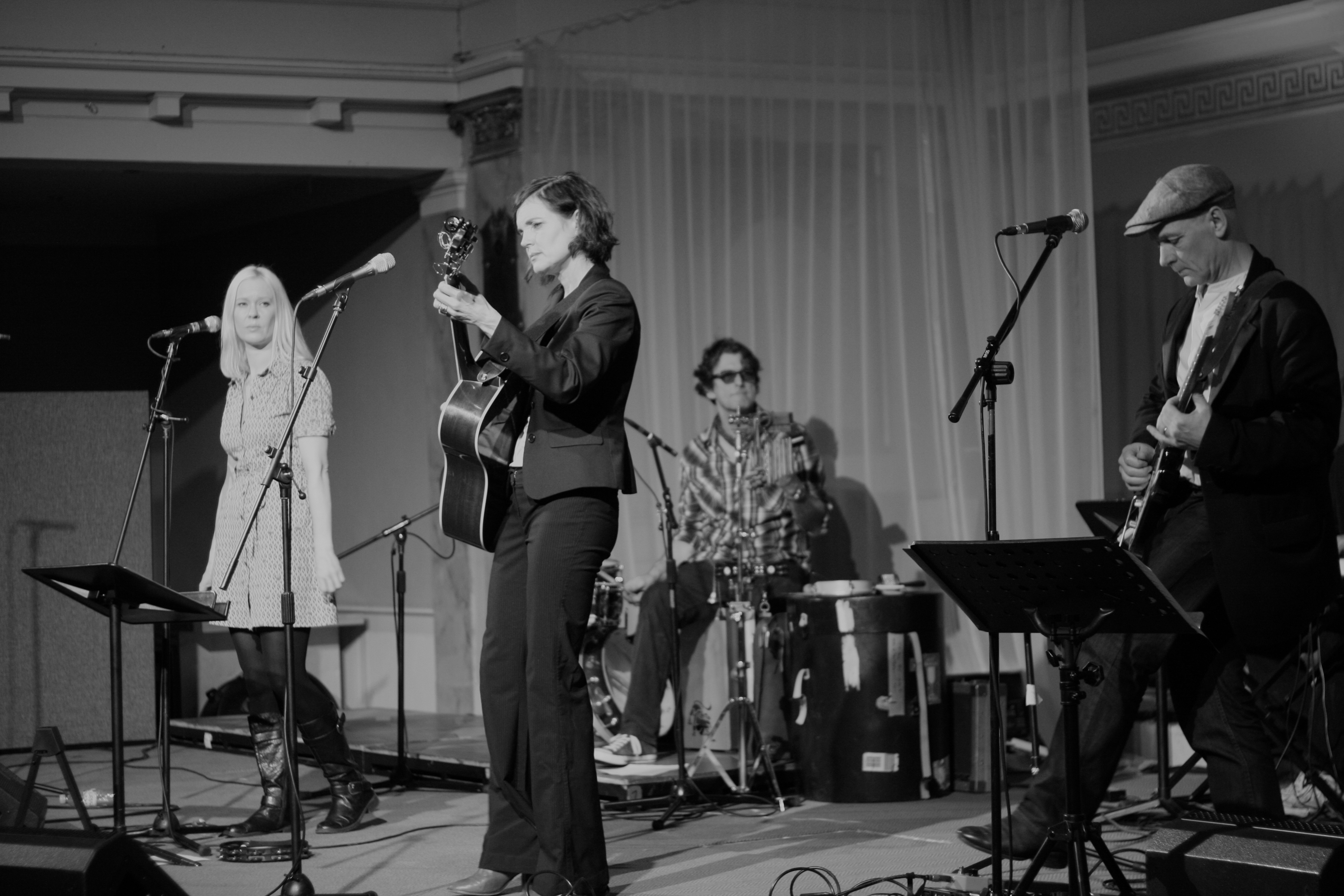
- Sadie and the Hotheads performing in London, 2012. (Left to right: Lizzie Deane, Elizabeth McGovern, Terl Bryant, Simon Nelson)

Background information
- Origin: London, England
- Genre: Folk, Roots rock, Americana
- Years active: 2007–present
- Labels: Absolute; Warner Music; Mi5 Recordings
- Members: Elizabeth McGovern; Simon Nelson; Steve Nelson; Nick Lacey; Terl Bryant; Danica Chapman; Andy 'Wal' Coughlan
- Past members: Ron Knights; Lizzie Deane; Rowan Oliver

Sadie and the Hotheads are a UK-based European Americana band formed in 2007 when American actress Elizabeth McGovern was encouraged by her guitar teacher, Steve Nelson of The Nelson Brothers, to write songs. Nelson then introduced McGovern to his brother Simon Nelson and together, they began to collaborate with other local musicians including Rowan Oliver from Goldfrapp on drums, Ron Knights on bass and Lizzie Deane on backing vocals.

== History ==
=== The early years (2007–2012) ===
Elizabeth McGovern, an American actress based in London, first met Steve Nelson when she saw an ad in her local newspaper for guitar lessons with him. The lessons soon morphed into song-writing sessions and Steve's brother Simon Nelson was introduced to McGovern. The trio began to develop music from McGovern's lyrics and Rowan Oliver of Goldfrapp, among others, were soon on board with the project which resulted in the band's debut album, I Can Wait in 2007.

The band continued to tinker away quietly and played a few low-profile gigs over the years, acquiring the backing of a British music agent along the way. This allowed them to gain greater exposure at music festivals such as the Isle of Wight Festival, but after McGovern became involved with the TV series Downton Abbey in 2010, performing the role of Cora, Countess of Grantham, the band's profile started to reach a much broader audience.

On 29 October 2012, the band released their second album How Not To Lose Things with McGovern's Downton Abbey co-star Michelle Dockery joining the band on some of the tracks as a guest backing vocalist. They then embarked on their first residency at The Troubadour during November in support of the album.

=== Touring and Still Waiting (2013–2014) ===
In February 2013, the band embarked on their first headline tour of England, performing in venues such as London's Union Chapel. Following this, they were invited to open for Nashville Singer-Songwriter Gretchen Peters, who was on her own tour of the UK at the time, at her London show as her special guests. The band went on to perform at a variety of places over the summer months including the Isle of Wight Festival, a nine night residency at the Edinburgh Fringe Festival and made their first international appearance as the support act for Sting at the Montreux Jazz Festival in Switzerland.

Sadie and the Hotheads kept up their momentum of live performances going into Autumn playing a handful of dates in Sweden during September before returning to the UK to take up a three-week residency at the Hippodrome in London in November. Not long before the start of this residency, the band announced that they were working on their third album, set for release in February 2014, in partnership with PledgeMusic, a direct-to-fan music platform. This gave fans who pledged the opportunity to get behind-the-scenes access to the process and progress of making the album as well as being able to pledge on other items in addition to the music such as the chance to Skype with McGovern and to own handwritten lyrics.

Following a couple of stand-alone gigs in Glasgow and Petersfield in early 2014, the band released their third studio album, Still Waiting with "Everybody's Got a Song" as the single in early February. It was produced by Kipper Eldridge, who has also produced Sting's albums. They then hit the road as the support act for Mike and the Mechanics 25th anniversary 'Living Years' UK tour which consisted of 23 dates over February and March. The tour finished with a performance at the Hammersmith Apollo in London.

After a short break, Sadie and the Hotheads reformed for the summer festival season. At the start of June, they appeared at the Wychwood Festival as World Vision Artist Ambassadors. One of the festival's two main partners that year was World Vision UK. The following month, the band returned to Europe for a one-off performance in Rome, Italy at the Hard Rock Live Festival as one of the headline acts.

Their final gig of the summer was particularly notable as the band were invited to perform at World War I commemoration event "Heroes at Highclere", which marked the centenary of the First World War. It was located at Highclere Castle, the setting for TV period drama Downton Abbey and where McGovern filmed many scenes as Cora, Countess of Grantham. As the majority of the Downton cast were filming on location in Northumberland, McGovern was one of only two cast members present that day with David Robb, who portrayed Dr. Clarkson in the series, being the other one. Before the band began their set however, a message was shown on the big screen beside the stage in which McGovern's on-screen husband Lord Grantham (played by Hugh Bonneville) introduced Sadie and the Hotheads to the crowd.

As Autumn commenced, the band went back into the studio to record a Christmas single, a cover of the classic song "The Little Drummer Boy". It was released on 1 December, accompanied by a music video and the track also featured on "White Christmas", a compilation album. Coinciding with the release of "The Little Drummer Boy", that evening, the band featured on the first episode of Sky Arts channel's festive series, "The Christmas Window Live" which aired in real time in the UK. Set in a festively decorated shop window at Westfield Stratford mall in London, the curtain opened to reveal the band in the window and they performed for fifteen minutes to a crowd outside.

In the lead up to the release of "The Little Drummer Boy" and their appearance on Sky Arts, Sadie and the Hotheads also announced their debut tour of the United States, with a string of dates scheduled for early December along the East Coast. As keys player Nick Lacey had another commitment, Gretchen Peters' husband and musical partner Barry Walsh joined the band on the keys for the duration of the tour. The Hotheads' final show, which took place at Infinity Music Hall in Hartford, Connecticut, was filmed by CPTV for US broadcaster PBS as one of the "Infinity Hall LIVE" episodes. It aired on 19 June 2015.

=== Hiatus and a Return to the Studio (2015–present) ===
Up until the Autumn of 2015, the band were on hiatus with members pursuing other projects, both musical and non-musical. Simon and Steve Nelson played a couple of gigs as The Nelson Brothers with their full band at live music venues including The Troubadour, where they had played with Sadie and the Hotheads in late 2012. Elizabeth McGovern worked on the final season of Downton Abbey with filming being completed in August. The band then reunited to do a mini-tour at the end of October with performances in London's Bush Hall and Revelation St Mary's church in Ashford, Kent. They also headlined the fundraising gala "Star Dust" at the Whitehall Banqueting House in London on 1 November with proceeds going to One to One Children's Fund.

During this period, the band also prepared and began to work on their fourth album in the weeks leading up to Christmas. In addition to recording their new album, on 11 March 2016, Sadie and the Hotheads released their first compilation album "The Collection (Everybody's Got A Song)", which consists of 17 tracks from the first three albums. Two days later they performed at the "Country to Country" festival in the "Under The Apple Tree Sessions". While McGovern starred in a new play by Alexi Kaye Campbell called "Sunset at the Villa Thalia" over the Summer, she and the band continued to fit in recording time at the studio. They then reconvened in Autumn for a performance at the British Library, which also included McGovern reading some poems in support of the Josephine Hart Poetry Foundation.

In early 2019, "The Truth" was released. And though it features all of the band members of Sadie and the Hotheads, McGovern has stated that "the label thought people could find it more easily" if it was released under her own name. As with "Still Waiting", it was produced by Kipper Eldridge, and includes an artist guest vocal appearance by Samuel L. Jackson.

== Personnel ==
=== Current members ===
- Elizabeth McGovern – lead vocals, acoustic guitar (2007–present)
- Simon Nelson – Electric and acoustic guitar, dobro, slide guitar, mandolin, backing vocals (2007–present)
- Steve Nelson – Acoustic guitar, bouzouki, banjo, ukulele, backing vocals (2007–present)
- Nick Lacey – Keyboards, piano, tin whistle (2007–present)
- Terl Bryant – Drums, percussion (2008–present)
- Danica Chapman – Backing vocals (2013–present)
- Andy ‘Wal’ Coughlan – Bass (2015–present)

=== Former members ===
- Ron Knights – Acoustic and electric bass, double bass (2007–2014)
- Lizzie Deane – Backing vocals (2007–2012)
- Rowan Oliver – Drums, percussion (2007)

=== Touring musicians ===
- Barry Walsh – Keyboard (2014)
- Rowan Oliver – Drums, percussion (2014)
- Philly Lopez – Backing Vocals (2013)

== Discography ==
=== Studio albums ===
| Year | Album title | Notes |
|---|---|---|
| 2007 | I Can Wait | |
| 2012 | How Not to Lose Things | |
| 2014 | Still Waiting | |
| 2016 | The Collection (Everybody's Got a Song) | Compilation album of songs from first three albums. |
| 2019 | The Truth | Released under Elizabeth McGovern's name. Features all Sadie and the Hotheads musicians. |
