= Complicit (play) =

Play by Joe Sutton

Complicit is a play by American playwright Joe Sutton premièred at The Old Vic Theatre in London on 7 January 2009. The cast of Richard Dreyfuss (Pulitzer Prize–winning journalist Ben Kritzer), Elizabeth McGovern (his wife Judith) and David Suchet (his defence lawyer and friend Roger Cowan) was directed by Kevin Spacey.

== Plot synopsis ==
The play takes place after September 11 attacks. Journalist Ben Kritzer finds himself in front of a Grand Jury faced with his own choice.
