= Terl Bryant =

English musician

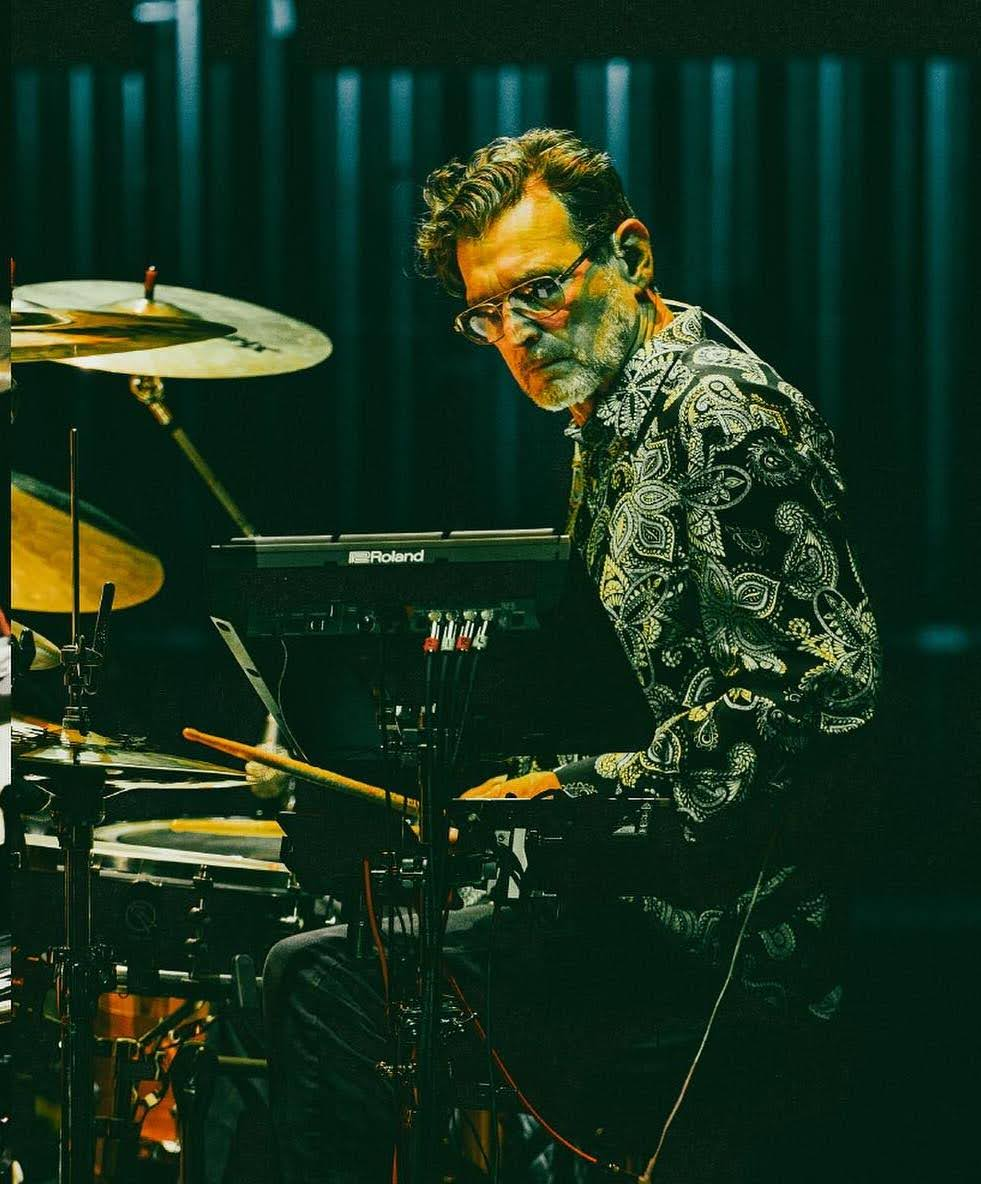
- Bryant performing with Martin Barre in 2024

Background information
- Origin: Northampton, England
- Genres: Alternative rock; progressive rock; folk rock
- Occupations: Musician; record producer
- Instruments: Drums; percussion
- Website: http://www.terl.uk/

Terl Bryant is an English drummer, percussionist and musician who has produced a number of his own works and is credited for touring and recording with John Paul Jones of Led Zeppelin, Iona and Peter Murphy amongst others.

== Biography ==
Originally from Northamptonshire, UK, Bryant left school at sixteen to play drums with Bedford based rock band 'Stranger' who went on to become known as Tobruk. During his early career he also worked with American singer/songwriter Chris Gaffney and for CCM rock singer and filmmaker Steve Taylor and Sheila Walsh with whom he toured the USA and Europe. In 1986 Bryant auditioned and joined Peter Murphy's Hundred Men. Bryant is credited on 3 of Peter Murphy's albums and played on the hit song Cuts You Up. During the 1990s, Bryant worked with the influential folk-themed progressive band Iona with whom he recorded 4 studio albums and 1 double 'live' album. In the early 1990's Bryant also recorded and toured with Roddy Frame, Maddy Prior, Steeleye Span and Barbara Dickson.

In 1999, Bryant joined former Led Zeppelin bass guitarist and multi-instrumentalist John Paul Jones as part of his trio alongside Chapman stick player Nick Beggs. Between 1999 and 2002, they did two world tours, including one with King Crimson. Terl Bryant played drums on JPJ's 2001 album The Thunderthief. During the following years Bryant went on to work with Faith Hill, Louise Redknapp, Matt Redman, Right Said Fred and did regular session work for UK producer Steve Levine. Between 2010 and 2015, he was a regular member of Sadie and the Hotheads, fronted by the Downton Abbey actress and singer-songwriter Elizabeth McGovern. Bryant recorded 3 albums with McGovern and the band opened for Sting at the Montreux Jazz Festival in 2013 and toured with Mike and the Mechanics in 2014. Later the same year Bryant performed with Adrian Edmondson and The Bad Shepherds and toured Australia. From 2015-2021 Bryant recorded album tracks for Joanne Hogg, Matt Steady, The Stefano Ianne Project, Paul Etterlin, Roland Buhlmann and regularly toured and recorded with British singer/songwriter and worship leader Graham Kendrick. Since 2023 Bryant has been touring in the USA and Europe with Jethro Tull guitarist Martin Barre.

Bryant has released several solo albums, including Kaleidoscope (2013), Seven Times (2023), and Jargon (2025). He is also known for his educational and storytelling work under the name Voice of Drums, an initiative combining rhythm, performance, and creative mentorship.

In the mid-1990s, Bryant founded Psalm Drummers, an international network of Christian drummers. He wrote and produced four albums associated with the project: Psalm (1995), Psalm Drummers (2004), Drums of Hope (2006), and Rhythms of Fire (2007). Bryant also authored A Heart to Drum (Survivor Books, 2006).

== Discography ==
Solo

- Psalm (1995)
- Beauty... as far as the eye can see (1997) (marketed as Terl Bryant's Psalm: Beauty... as far as the Eye can see)
- Timbrel (1999)
- 'Psalm Drummers (album/DVD) (2004)
- Rhythms of Fire (2007)
- Drums of Hope (album/DVD) (2008)
- More Gas (compilation) (2010)
- Ultimate Drums (loops and samples production tools) (2013)
- Kaleidoscope (Bandcamp 2013)
- Undercurrents (EP) (Bandcamp 2017)
- Never Never (Bandcamp 2020)
- Hidden In Green (Bandcamp 2021)
- Pollination (Bandcamp 2023)
- Seven Times (CD album) (Bandcamp 2023)
- Jargon (CD and Vinyl album) (Bandcamp / Ditto Music 2025)

With others

- Common Bond – Heaven Is Calling (1984)
- Darrell Mansfield – Revelation (1985)
- Steve Taylor – Limelight (1986)
- Terry Scott Taylor - Knowledge & Innocence (1986)
- Iona – Iona, The Book of Kells, Beyond These Shores, Treasures, Journey into the Morn and Heaven's Bright Sun (1989–1998)
- Maddy Prior – Lionhearts, Arthur the King, Ravenchild (1997–1999)
- Michelle Collins – Sunburn (1997)
- Roddy Frame – North Star (1998)
- Honeyz – Wonder No. 8 (1998)
- Louise Redknapp – Woman in Me (1998)
- Shirley Bassey and Bryn Terfel - World in Union (1999)
- "Grief Never Grows Old" – Tsunami relief song with Brian Wilson, Steve Winwood, Sir Cliff Richard, Russell Watson, George Michael, Andy Gibb, Gary Moore, Davey Spillane
- Musik Zum Atemholen with David Bird, Jon Large, Terl Bryant, Richard Lacy, Frank Mizen, Clare Langan, Rachel Davies and Simeon Wood (2000)
- Barbara Dickson – Nothing's Gonna Change My World (2003)
- Eden's Bridge – Celtic Series and Isle of Tides (2005), The Winter Sings (2010)
- Jules Bryant – Drops of Glittering Hope (produced by Terl Bryant, 2004)
- Peter Murphy – Love Hysteria, Deep, Holy Smoke (1986–1991)
- John Paul Jones – The Thunderthief (2001)
- 6 Day Riot – Maybe (2006)
- Sadie and the Hotheads featuring Elizabeth McGovern - I Can Wait (2007)
- Stefano Ianne – Piano Car (2010)
- Graham Kendrick – Acoustic Gospels (2010)
- Stuart Townend – The Journey (2011)
- Graham Kendrick - The Very Best of Graham Kendrick (2011)
- Dani – Open Spaces (2011)
- Graham Kendrick - Holy Overshadowing/Adore Single Projects (2017-2018)
- Sadie and the Hotheads featuring Elizabeth McGovern - How Not To Lose Things (2012)
- Right Said Fred - Raining in England (2011), Mojive (2018)
- Sadie and the Hotheads featuring Elizabeth McGovern - Still Waiting (2014), Little Drummer Boy (2014), The Truth (2019)
- Leslie Garrett – A North Country Lass
- Stefano Ianne, Mario Marzi, Terl Bryant – Duga-3 (2018)
- Graham Kendrick - Keep The Banner Flying High (2019)
- Joanne Hogg - The Map Project Part 1 (2019)
- Matt Steady - Chasing Down Wolves (2020)
- Matt Steady - Nawglan, the Sacred Nine (2020)
- Roland Buhlmann - Dubnos (2020)
- Arthur Brown (musician) - House of the Rising Sun (2020)
- Stefano Ianne, Mario Marzi, Terl Bryant - Les Belles Habitudes (2021)
- Muntjac Jubilee (2021)
- The Grace Machine (Matt Steady, Terl Bryant and Matt Weeks) - New Buryin' Ground (2021)
- Ruth Lyon - Nothings Perfect (2022)
- Matt Weeks - Murmurs (2022)
- Joanne Hogg - The Map Project Part 2 (2022)
- Terry Scott Taylor - This Beautiful Mystery (2022)
- Roland Buhlmann - Emnalóc (2022)
- Matt Steady - Presence (2023)
- Wendell Kimbrough - You Belong (2023)
- Steve Levine, Baltic Jazz - Revisioned (2023)
- Muntjac - Liminal (2024)
- Matt Steady - The Flight of the Raven (2024)
- Barbara Dickson - My Own Adventure (2024)
- Barbara Dickson - Live in Concert (2024)
- Godfrey Rust - Entangled (voices from a quantum universe) (2025)
- Matt Steady - Cairn (2025)
- Sadie and the Hotheads featuring Elizabeth McGovern - Let's Stop Fighting (2025)
- Martin Barre - The Acoustic Trio & The Electric Quartet - Live In The USA And Europe (2026)

== Books ==
- A Heart to Drum (2006) - ISBN 1-84291-335-2
