= Joe Sutton =

American playwright

Joe Sutton is an American playwright. He teaches playwrighting at Dartmouth College. He is the son of actor Frank Sutton, most famous for playing Sgt. Carter on Gomer Pyle – USMC.

His play Voir Dire opened in 1995 at the Seattle Repertory Theatre. The play received attention after the O. J. Simpson murder case and the sequestered jury deliberating a case with strong racial overtones and divisive social implications. His play Complicit, was directed by Kevin Spacey and premiered at The Old Vic in London on January 3, 2009.

== Publication ==
- Restoring The Sun
- The Third Army
