= Timbrel (album) =

Studio album by Terl Bryant
- Released: 1999
- Genres: Progressive rock, Christian rock
- Length: 65:28
- Label: Rhythm House Records
- Producer: Terl Bryant

Terl Bryant chronology
Beauty...As Far as the Eye Can See (1993)	Timbrel (1999)

Professional ratings
Review scores
Source	Rating
The Phantom Tollbooth	Positive link

Timbrel is an album by Terl Bryant. Released in 1999.

This is an album from ex Iona drummer Terl Bryant. The rhythms of praise flow through these psalms performed by Terl and a group including the talents of Joanne Hogg, Juliet Bryant, Charlie Groves, Ali Groves, Bruce Pont, Troy Donockley, Mike Haughton, Dave Bainbridge, Phil Parker.

The album includes some of the same musical traditions utilised by the band Iona. The character of the project maintains a style of music for Christian worship that is unique in its rhythmic focus. By incorporating vocal talents that are specific to the nature of each song, there is a personal element that allows each presentation to become unique.

Recordings took place at the following:

- ICC Studios, Eastbourne, England – (Engineer Neil Costello)
- Soundfield, Derby, England – (Engineer Neil Costello)
- Gemini Studios, Ipswich, England – (Engineer Neil Costello)

== Personnel ==
=== Band ===
- Terl Bryant – Drums, Percussion, Bodhrans, Rainstick, Antique Snare Drums, Effect Cymbals, Spanner Chimes, Finger Cymbals, Zibel and Floor Toms, Key Chimes, Earth Plates, Burma Bell, Pin Chimes, Gong, Dholak, Tambourine, Bongos, Sally Army Bass Drum
- Dave Bainbridge – Keyboards, Electric and Acoustic Guitars, Bass Synth, E-Bow Guitar
- Juliet Bryant – Backings Vocals
- Nicole Riorden – Backings Vocals
- Charlie Groves – Backing Vocals, Violin
- Ali Groves – Backing Vocals
- Tim Harries – Bass
- Stuart Garrand – Vocals, E-Bow and Tremolo Guitars, Acoustic Guitar
- Joanne Hogg – Vocals, High Backing Vocals
- Pat Grueber – Bass
- Phil Barker – Bass, Fretless Bass
- Troy Donockley – Uilleann pipes, Low Whistle
- Peter Bones – Acoustic & Electric Guitars, E-Bow Guitar, Bass, Percussion
- Mike Parlett – Soprano Saxophone
- Michael Haughton – Baritone Saxophone, Tin Whistle
- Bruce Pont – Maldek
- Mark Edwards – Piano, Keyboards
- Ben Okfar – Vocals (English, Ibo), Talking Drum
- Phil Crabbe – Wood Blocks, Cowbell, Triangle, Cymbal, Bongos, Snare Drums
- Mike Sturgis – Bass Drum, Old Toms, Cabasa, Snare Rim, Snare Drums
- Alex Legg – Vocals
- Dave Clifton – Guitar, High Vocals
- Andy Coughlan – Bass

Ten drummers

- Terl Bryant
- Chip Bailey
- Phil Crabbe
- Mark Green
- Dave Luzquinos
- Phil Manning
- Martin Neil
- Calum Rees
- Mike Sturgis
- Dan Weeks

== Track listing ==
Disc – Total Time 65:28

1. "The Lord Reigns" – 4:48
2. "Christ Be in Me" – 4:25
3. "Israel" – 4:39
4. "A Dangerous Sea" – 4:53
5. "Barefoot in the Grass" – 2:25
6. "The King of Love" – 3:17
7. "Though I Walk" – 5:33
8. "In the Shadow of Great Wings" – 5:28
9. "Do Not Fear" – 7:13
10. "The Battle Prayer" – 6:17
11. "Vision of Hope" – 4:06
12. "Here is Love" – 5:09
13. "Ten Drummers Drumming" – 7:15

== Release details ==
- 1999, UK, Rhythm House Records/ICC Records RHR 4249, Release Date ? ? 1999, CD
