= Lection =

Reading from scripture in liturgy

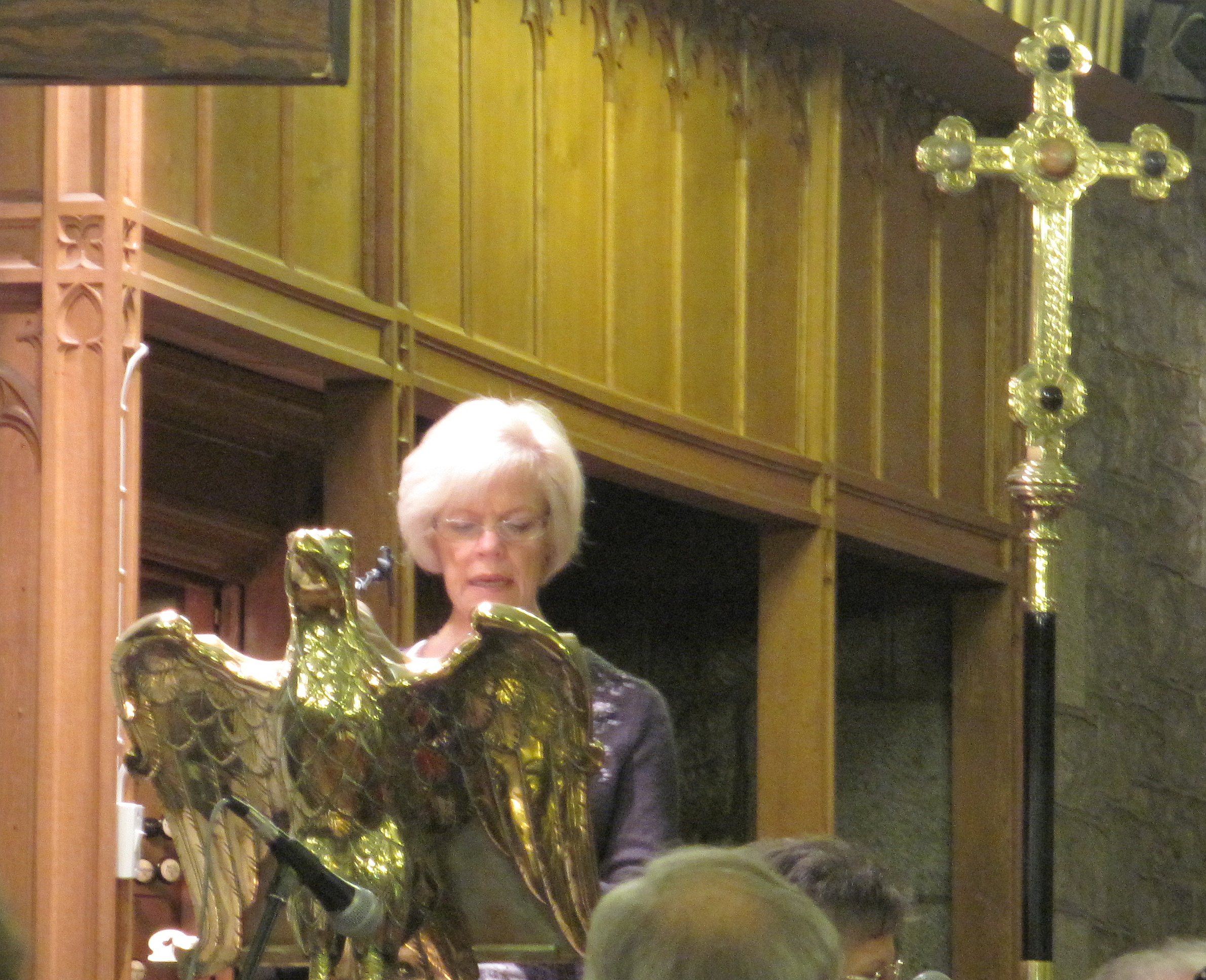
A Scripture lesson being read in a service of Nine Lessons and Carols.

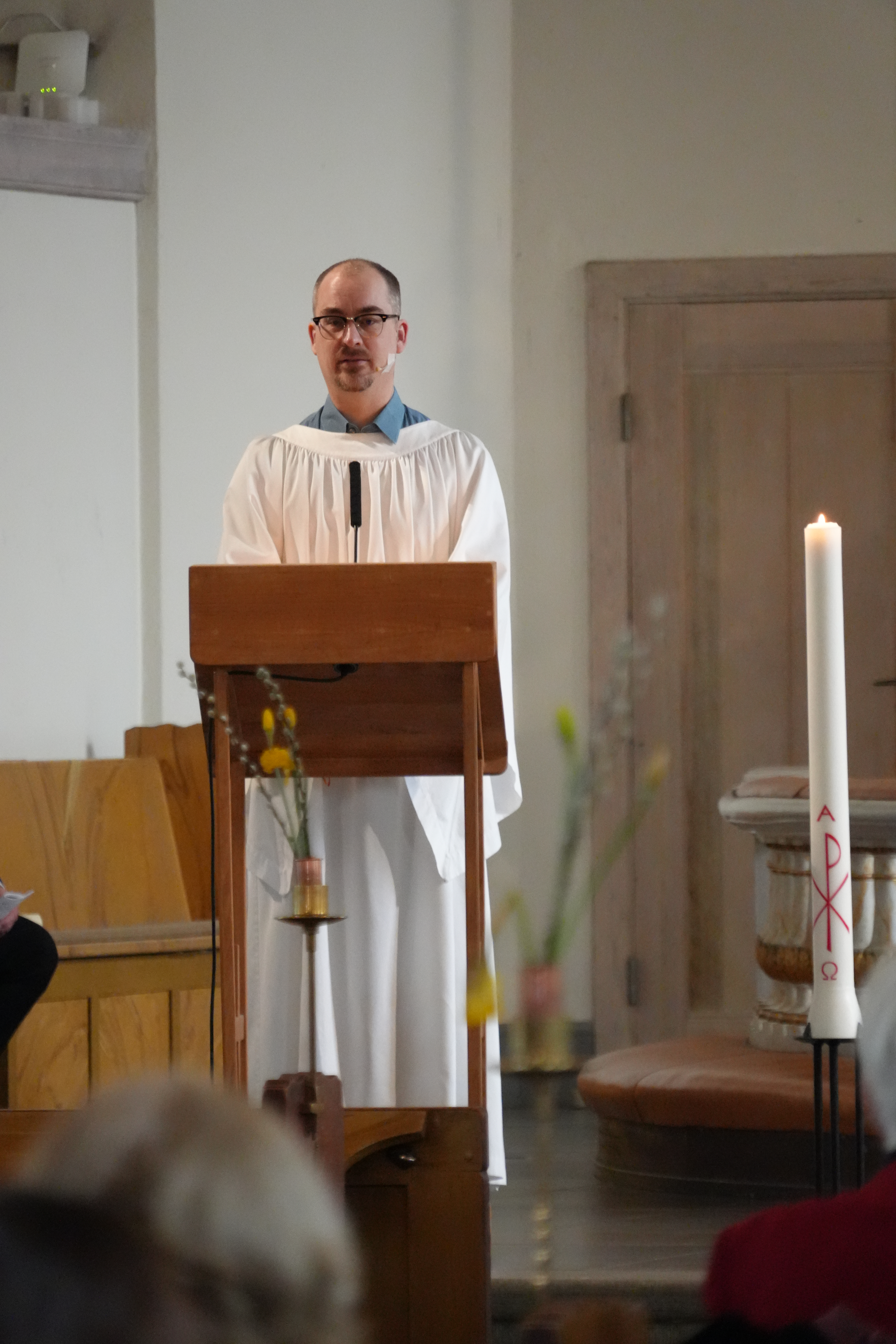
A lector does the first reading during the Mass of Easter Monday at Kungsholm Evangelical-Lutheran Church, part of the Diocese of Stockholm in Sweden (2026)

A lection, also called the lesson, is a reading from scripture in liturgy. In many Christian denominations, the readings of the day are appointed in the lectionary.

== History ==
The custom of reading the books of Moses in the synagogues on Sabbath is a very ancient one. Since the prophetic books were written after the books of Moses, readings from them began later, and were common at the time of Jesus. This element in synagogue worship was taken over with others into the Christian divine service, as may be gathered from passages in the gospels such as St Luke 4:16–20 and 16:29. During early Christianity, readings began to be made from the writings of the Apostles and evangelists as the New Testament canon developed. Mention of this is found within the New Testament itself, for example in Colossians 4:16 and in First Thessalonians 5:27.

The oldest manuscripts of the Gospels have marginal marks, and sometimes actual interpolations, which can only be accounted for as indicating the beginnings and endings of liturgical lessons.

From the 2nd century onwards references multiply, though the earlier references do not prove the existence of a fixed lectionary or order of lessons, but rather point the other way. Justin Martyr, describing divine worship in the middle of the 2nd century says: "On the day called Sunday all who live in cities or in the country gather together to one place, and the memoirs of the Apostles, or the writings of the Prophets are read as long as time permits" (Apol. i. cap. 67). Tertullian about half a century later makes frequent reference to the reading of Holy Scripture in public worship (Apol. ~9; De praescript. 36; De amina, 9).

The canons of Hippolytus, written in the first half of the 3rd century says, "Let presbyters, subdeacons and readers, and all the people assemble daily in the church at time of cockcrow, and betake themselves to prayers, to psalms and to the reading of the Scriptures, according to the command of the Apostles, until I come attend to reading" (canon xxi).

There are traces of fixed lessons coming into existence in the course of the 3rd century. Origen refers to the Book of Job being read in Holy Week (Commentaries on Job, lib. i.). In the 4th century such references are frequent. John Cassian (c. 380) states that throughout Egypt the Psalms were divided into groups of twelve, and that after each group there followed two lessons, one from the Old Testament and one from the New Testament (De caenob. inst. ii. 4), implying but not absolutely stating that there was a fixed order of such lessons just as there was of the Psalms. St Basil the Great mentions fixed lessons on certain occasions taken from Isaiah, Proverbs, St Matthew and Acts (Hom. xiii. De bapt.). From Chrysostom (Horn. lxiii. in Act. etc.), and Augustine (Tract. vi. in Joann. &c.) both state that Genesis was read in Lent, Job and Jonah in Passion Week, the Acts of the Apostles in Eastertide, lessons on the Passion on Good Friday, and lessons on the Resurrection on Easter Day.

In the Apostolic Constitutions (ii. 57, ca. 380) a service is described which is required of the church. First come two lessons from the Old Testament by a reader, the whole of the Old Testament being made use of except the books of the Apocrypha. The Psalms of David are then to be sung. Next the Acts of the Apostles and the Epistles of Paul are to be read. Finally the four Gospels are to be read by a deacon or a priest. Whether the selections were ad libitum or according to a fixed table of lessons is not mentioned.

The Third Council of Carthage (397) forbade anything but Holy Scripture to be read in church. This rule has been adhered to so far as the liturgical epistle and gospel, and occasional additional lessons in the Roman Missal are concerned, but in the divine office, on feasts when nine lessons are read at matins, only the first three lessons are taken from Holy Scripture, the next three being taken from the sermons of ecclesiastical writers, and the last three from expositions of the day's gospel; but sometimes the lives or Passions of the saints, or of some particular saints, were substituted for any or all of these breviary lessons.

Nothing in the shape of a lectionary is extant older than the 8th century, though there is evidence that Claudianus Marnercus made one for the church at Vienna in 450, and that Musaeus made one for the church at Marseille ca. 458.

== Conclusion of readings ==
In many Christian denominations, when the lector finishes reading the scripture lesson, they say one of the following:

- "The Word of the Lord."
- "May God bless the reading of His Word."
- "Here endeth the first/second lesson."

The congregation responds with "Thanks be to God."

If the reading is from one of the Epistles in the Bible, lectors may conclude it with:

- "Here endeth the Epistle."

If the reading is from one of the Gospels in the Bible, lectors may conclude it with:

"The Gospel of the LORD."

The congregation responds with "Praise to You Lord Jesus Christ" (along with a bowing their heads at the mention of the name "Jesus Christ").

== See also ==
- Gospel Book
- Lector
- Lectio Continua
- Lectio Divina
- Lectio Sacra
