= Reformed worship =

Reformed worship is religious devotion to God as conducted by Reformed or Calvinistic Christians, including Presbyterians. Despite considerable local and national variation, public worship in most Reformed and Presbyterian churches is governed by the Regulative principle of worship.

== General principles and historical overview ==
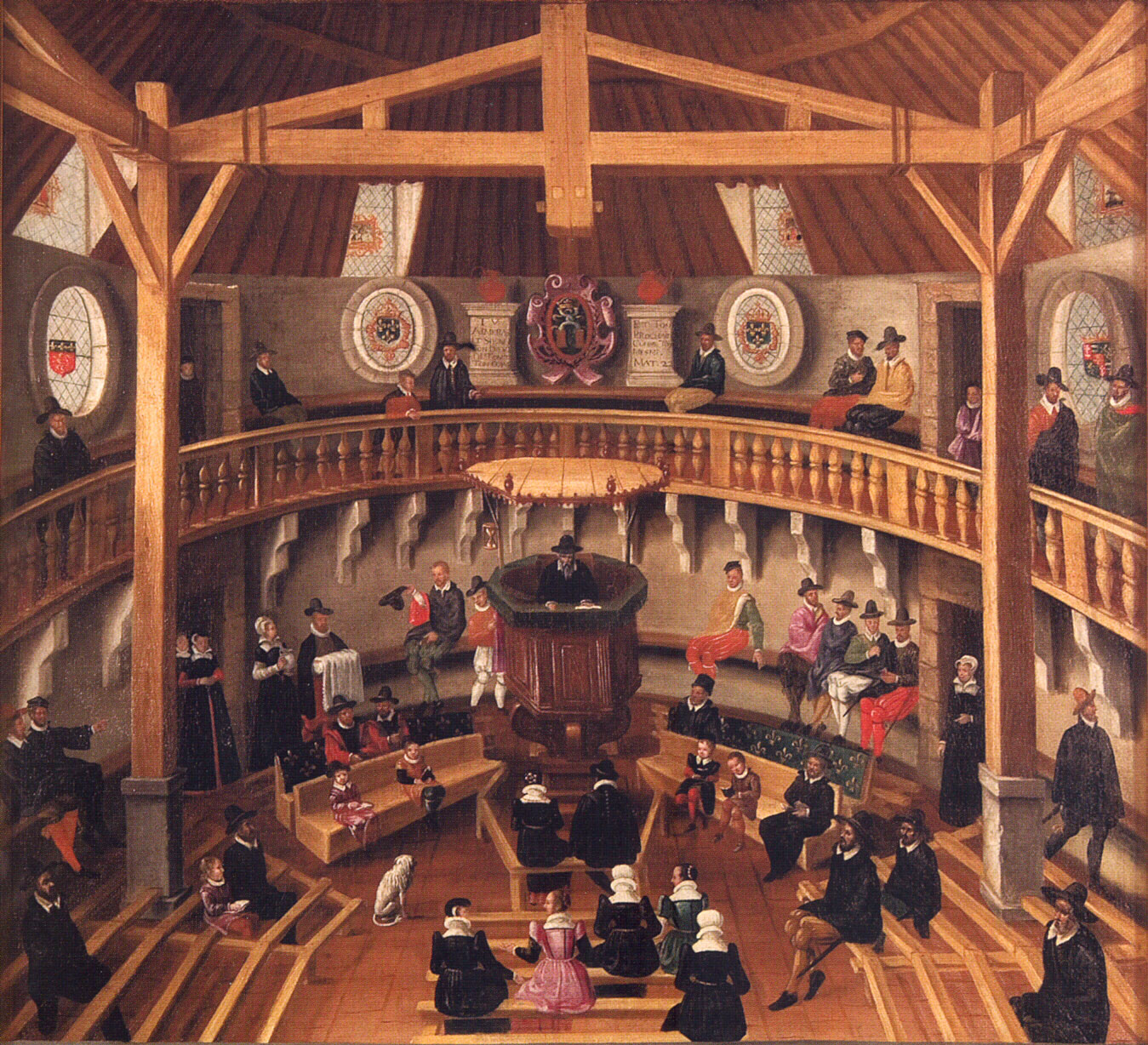
The Huguenot Temple de Lyon

Huldrych Zwingli, who began his reforming work in Zurich in 1518, introduced many radical changes to worship. His Sunday service, instituted in 1519, was apparently derived from a liturgy called Prone, a late Medieval service which was sometimes held before, during, or after mass. It contained the Lord's Prayer, a Hail Mary, a sermon, a remembrance of those who had died the previous week, another Lord's Prayer and Hail Mary, the Apostles' Creed, the Decalogue, confession, and absolution.

Martin Bucer, the reformer of Strasbourg, believed that proper worship must be conducted in obedience to the Bible, and for this reason he sought to eliminate many of the dramatic ceremonies which were part of the liturgy of the church. He limited worship to preaching, almsgiving, the Eucharist, and prayer. John Oecolampadius, in Basel, believed that while the Bible did not give detailed liturgical instruction, all worship must be guided by biblical principles. For him this meant that worship should be simple and unpretentious.

John Calvin's ideas about worship were influenced Martin Bucer and William Farel during his time in Strasbourg beginning in 1538. When he came to Geneva in 1536, Farel had already begun a Zwinglian reformation. His liturgy emphasized the unworthiness of the worshiper with the Ten Commandments being sung every Sunday, a practice probably taken from Martin Bucer. The service was also very didactic, with even the prayers written with the intention to instruct. Calvin did not insist on having explicit biblical precedents for every element of worship, but looked to the early church as his model and retained whatever he considered edifying. The liturgy was entirely in the vernacular, and the people were to participate in the prayers.

Calvin's Geneva became the model for all continental Reformed worship, and by the end of the sixteenth century a fixed liturgy was being used by all Reformed churches. Dutch Reformed churches developed an order of worship in refugee churches in England and Germany which was ratified at synods in Dordrecht in 1574 and 1578. The form emphasizes self-examination between the words of institution and communion consisting of accepting the misery of one's sin, assurance of mercy, and turning away those who are unrepentant.

The 1552 Book of Common Prayer was influenced by Reformed thinking through Scottish reformer John Knox's insistence on including what became known as the black rubric, a declaration that kneeling at the Eucharist did not imply adoration. Knox also wrote a liturgy for the newly founded Church of Scotland based on John Calvin's liturgy. Knox's liturgy set a structure for worship in Scotland, though ministers could improvise. Following the Union of the Crowns in 1603, the English made several attempts to impose the Book of Common Prayer on the Scots, which they fiercely resisted.

Following their return from exile in Geneva during the reign of Queen Mary I and King Philip, English Protestants known as Puritans (who remained within the Church of England) and separatists (who separated from it) began to attempt to introduce some of the more radical reforms they had experienced in Geneva into the worship of the Church of England, and in some ways to go beyond them. They sought to rid worship of any element not specifically prescribed in the Bible, though they disagreed on the practical implications of this. They also favored liturgical decisions to be made at the lowest level possible, rather than by a regional or national authority.

== Baptism ==
In the years leading up to the Reformation, baptism was often conducted in private as a celebration of the birth of children. The rite was considered necessary for salvation, and so midwives often baptized children to avoid the risk that the child would die unbaptized. Strasbourg reformer Martin Bucer made it a part of the worship service so that parishioners could be reminded of their own baptism, which was to be the sign of their incorporation into the church. The parents of children were to bring their children to the font following the sermon, and were admonished to catechize their children, a process which was intended to begin around age ten. Catechesis was considered to be entailed in baptism itself, and weekly catechetical services were instituted for this purpose. Zwingli understood baptism to be a sign of membership in a community rather than a ritual which conferred salvation on individuals. He, or possibly Oecolampadius, can be credited with first articulating this line of thought, later called covenant theology, which became the Reformed sacramental theology. During the Reformation, Anabaptists opposed the practice of infant baptism, arguing that only those who had made a profession of faith should be administered the rite. This was based on a theology of decisional regeneration, the teaching that only those who had made a decision for Christ could be saved. Against this, the Reformed believed that justification is only by grace, rather than based on any human decision.

Baptism also became a public event in Geneva, with the font moved to the front of the church or even being attached to the pulpit. Confirmation was abolished, but as in Strasbourg children were expected to make a public profession of faith when able, and this became the standard rite of passage for children to be admitted to communion in Reformed churches. Puritans also saw baptism as a prophetic sign at the beginning of Christian life. Confession of sin and professions of faith (such as reciting the Apostles' Creed) were considered the fulfillment of the sign, the living out of one's baptism, or improving on one's baptism.

The rise of revivalism in the eighteenth century brought about a greater emphasis on conversion, often as a dramatic emotional experience, as the means of beginning the Christian life rather than baptism. Congregationalist minister Horace Bushnell led a return to earlier understandings of baptism and catechesis. In the twentieth century some scholars argued that sacraments were not of biblical origin, leading to a revival of ceremony surrounding the sacraments which the reformers had removed.

== Preaching ==
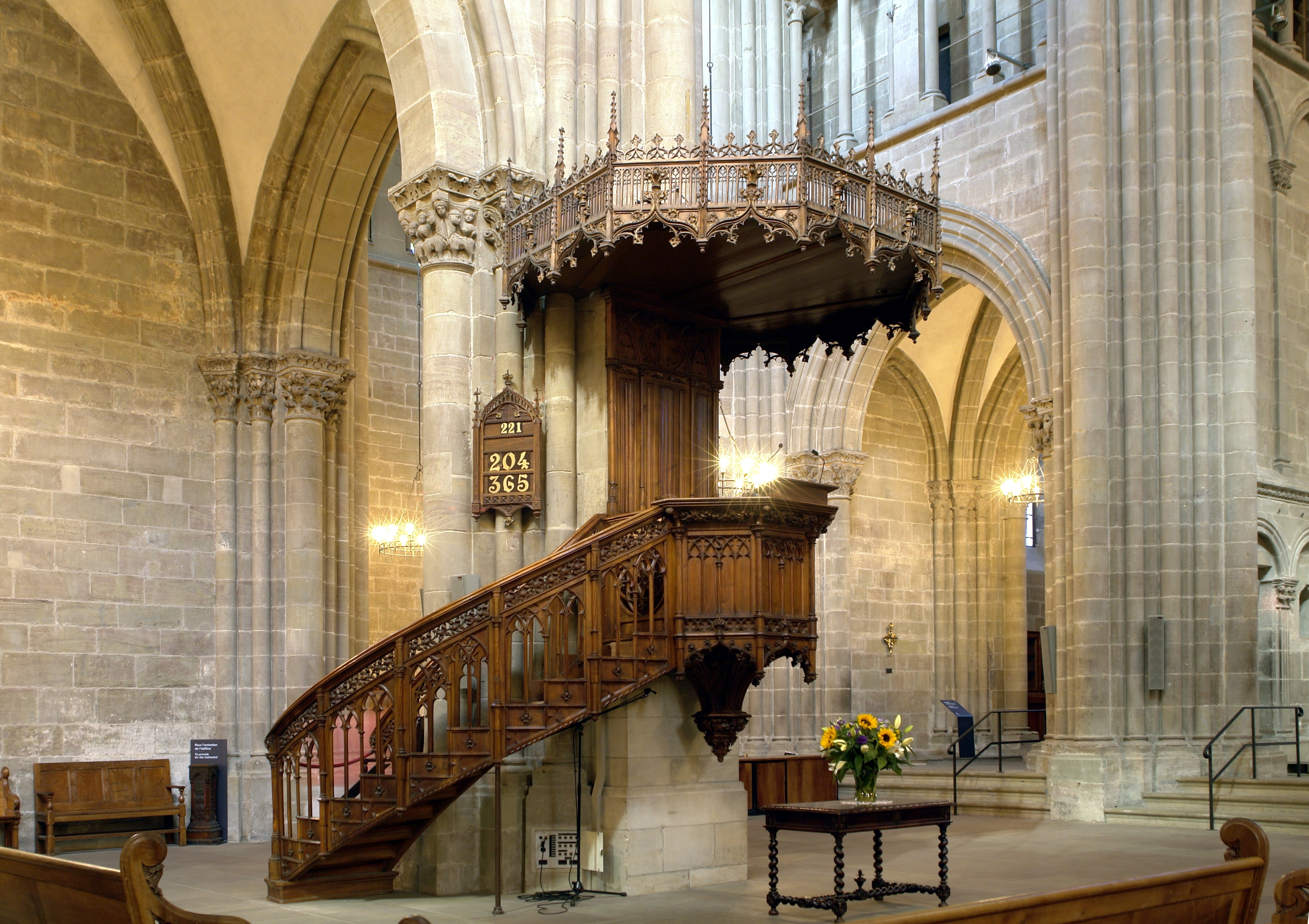
Pulpit of St. Pierre Cathedral, where John Calvin preached

Rather than preaching on the appointed gospel, as was the common practice at the time Zwingli preached through consecutive books of the Bible, a practice known as lectio continua which he learned from reading the sermons of John Chrysostom. John Oecolampadius preached from the Hebrew text rather than the Latin, though most theologians during the time often could not even read Greek. In Strasbourg, Martin Bucer and its other preachers also preached lectio continua. There, catechetical preaching took place every Sunday afternoon, so that the Creed, the Lord's Prayer, the Ten Commandments, and the sacraments were explained every year. This practice was also instituted in Wittenburg, Zurich, Basel, and Constance. Calvin preferred to conduct the entire service from the pulpit, and pulpits became prominent features in Reformed churches.

Reformed worship in the sixteenth and seventeenth centuries emphasized hearing the preached word. Catechesis for young and old ensured that what was heard was understood. Congregational prayers were long and theologically weighty.

== Music ==
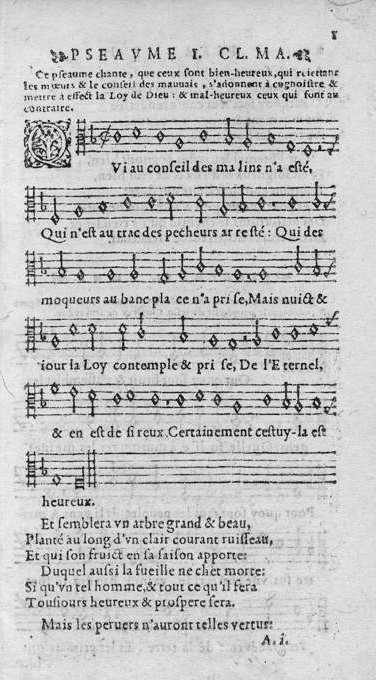
Psalm 1 from the Genevan Psalter of 1562

Music in worship was abolished altogether by Ulrich Zwingli in Zurich in 1523 based on a belief that the Bible did not allow for it and that physical means could not lead to spiritual edification.

A number of German cities published Protestant songbooks before Martin Luther's Geystliche gesangk Buchleyn, including Nuremberg and Erfurt. The reformed Church in Strasbourg, under the leadership of Martin Bucer, was one of the first to institute congregational singing to replace choral singing, and produced many psalms and hymns for this purpose, including some (such as 'Gott sei gelobt') by Luther. Although the first Strasbourg liturgies didn't include music, publishers soon began including musical notation. Early on, the biblical Psalms were used almost exclusively by the Strasbougers. Successive editions of the Strasbourg Psalter contained increasing numbers of psalms. In Constance, where Johannes Zwick and the Blarer brothers led, hymns as well as psalms were used, with the Constance Hymn Book of 1540 being divided evenly between hymns and psalms. In 1537, the Strasbourgers also began to include original hymns in their Psalter.

John Calvin began work on the Genevan Psalter in the French language in 1538. This psalter contained translations by poets such as Clément Marot and melodies written by composers such as Claude Goudimel and Louis Bourgeois. It consisted almost exclusively of psalms, and exclusive psalmody became the dominant practice among the Reformed for the next 200 years. Psalms were to be sung in unison by the congregation, though harmony was permitted in private. Notably, the Scottish Psalter was produced in 1564, based in part on Calvin's Genevan Psalter.

Singing a Psalm in unison was a standard practice before and after the sermon in all Reformed churches in the sixteenth and seventeenth centuries, with Zurich ending their prohibition on church music in 1598. A leader sang each line with the congregation repeating. Organs were forbidden, though trumpets were gradually introduced. Works like the 1562 English Sternhold and Hopkins Psalter were very popular among the Reformed. Literal translations of the Psalms began to be preferred by the Reformed over the looser translations of the Genevan and Sternhold and Hopkins psalters in the latter part of the sixteenth century. Some of the most influential psalters of the seventeenth century were the Scottish Psalter of 1635 and the Bay Psalm Book of 1640, which was the first book printed in America.

Isaac Watts, an early eighteenth-century English Congregationalist minister, translated psalms much more freely than his predecessors. Some complained that his psalms were not translations at all, but paraphrases. Watts also wrote many hymns, many of which imitated the psalms. The rise of pietism in the eighteenth century led to an even greater dominance of hymns.

Hymnody became acceptable for Presbyterians around the middle of the nineteenth century, though the Reformed Presbyterians continue to insist on exclusive a capella psalmody. The use of organs and choirs also became acceptable in Reformed churches during the nineteenth century, even in Zurich.

Sparked in 2001, with the publishing of In Christ Alone, the modern hymn movement has grown, primarily among Reformed Christians, as a response to the commercialism, false teaching, and arguably weaker theology found in much of the Contemporary Christian Music industry. The modern hymn movement seeks to elevate lyrical content over musical composition; rich theological truth over mindless, empty, or repetitive choruses. Including In Christ Alone by Keith Getty & Stuart Townend, other well known examples of modern hymns include Yet Not I But Through Christ in Me by CityAlight, His Mercy is More by Matt Papa & Matt Boswell, and How Deep the Father's Love for Us by Stuart Townend. Other artists that have and continue to contribute to this movement include Sovereign Grace Music, The Enfield Hymn Sessions, and Aaron Keyes. With these and other artists' compositions, modern hymns continue to be shared, adopted throughout Reformed churches as well as other Christian denominations and groups while continuing to be translated into multiple languages.

== Images, saints, and holy days ==
Zwingli and Jud also preached against prayer to saints, though the Hail Mary was retained in the liturgy until 1563. Starting in 1525, the Eucharist, which had been celebrated by priests each Sunday but only with the laity communing at Christmas, Easter, Pentecost, and the festival of Sts. Felix and Regula, the patron saints of Zurich, now only took place at those festivals, with the laity always participating. The festivals of Circumcision, Annunciation, and Ascension were also retained.

In Geneva, Saints' days were abolished, with only Christmas, Easter, Ascension, and Pentecost retained as holy days to be celebrated on Sundays, with a break in the lectio continua preaching for a sermon suited for the occasion. In continental Reformed churches, the five evangelical feasts of Christmas, Good Friday, Easter, Ascension, and Pentecost were regularly celebrated. Puritans largely discarded the church calendar.

== Daily prayer ==
Zwingli and his partner Leo Jud also introduced daily morning prophesyings, during which the Old Testament was expounded and the people invited to respond. In Geneva, every Wednesday became a day of prayer which focused on day-to-day concerns.

Followers of separatist John Robinson of the Scrooby Congregation, the group from which the Pilgrims who emigrated to Massachusetts Bay in 1620 was drawn, only allowed extemporaneous prayer.

== Lord's Supper (Communion) ==
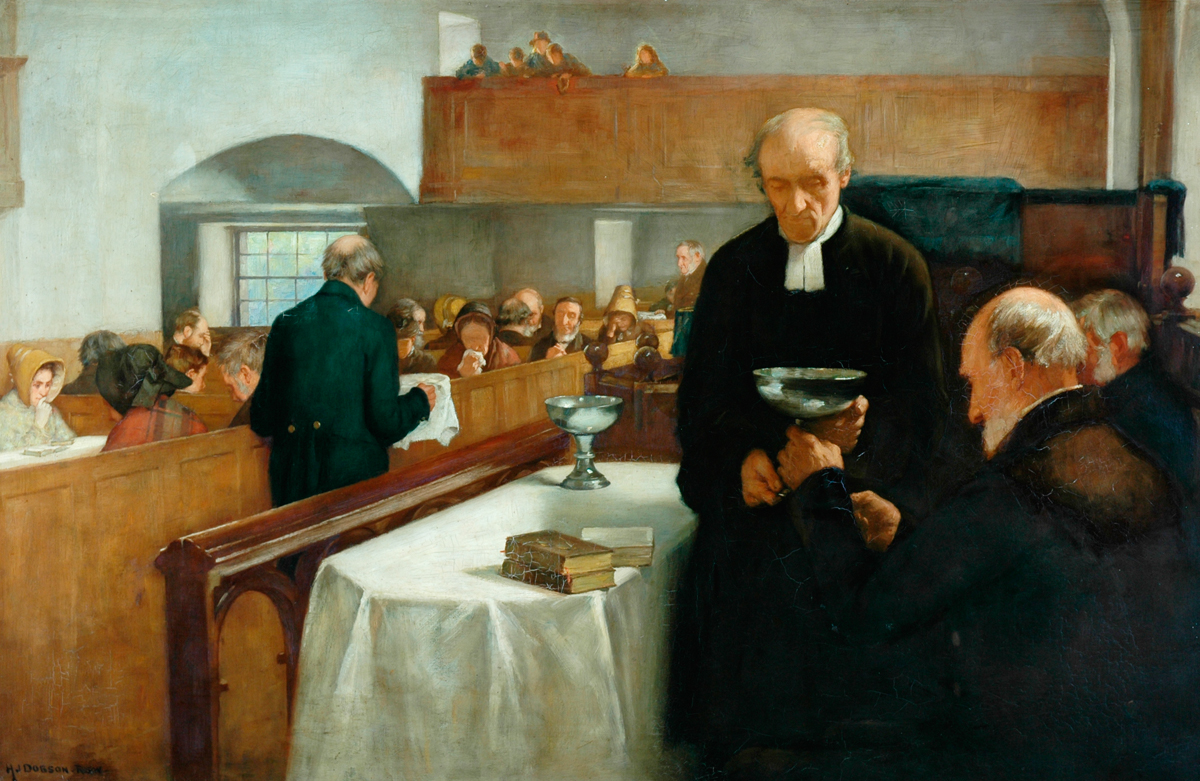
A Scottish Sacrament, by Henry John Dobson

Calvin took a mediating position between Luther and Zwingli regarding the sacrament of the Lord's Supper (also known as Communion). He held that Christ's body and blood are spiritually (rather than physically, as Luther insisted) conveyed to those who partake in faith. The people sat or knelt at a table to take communion. Calvin wished to have the Lord's Supper celebrated each Sunday, but was not allowed by the city council. Instead, it was celebrated every quarter, with an intense period of self-examination by the people beforehand. The determination of worthiness to receive the Lord's Supper was to be based upon trust in God alone for forgiveness of sin, repentance, and reconciliation with others, and the consistory was to keep watch to prevent flagrant, unrepentant offenders from partaking. Exclusion from the Lord's Supper was normally intended to be temporary, until the offender repented. In Reformed churches throughout continental Europe in the sixteenth and seventeenth centuries, the Lord's Supper was celebrated on feast days, and parishioners were expected to dress in a dignified manner. Common bread was used rather than unleavened sacramental bread.

== See also ==
- Calvinism
- Covenant renewal worship

== Bibliography ==
- Bürki, Bruno (2003). "Reformed Worship in Continental Europe in the Seventeenth Century". In Vischer, Lukas (ed.). Christian Worship in Reformed Churches Past and Present. Calvin Institute of Christian Worship Liturgical Studies. Cambridge: Wm. B. Eerdmans Publishing Company. ISBN 978-0802805201.
- McKee, Elsie Anne (2003). "Reformed Worship in the Sixteenth Century". In Vischer, Lukas (ed.). Christian Worship in Reformed Churches Past and Present. Calvin Institute of Christian Worship Liturgical Studies. Cambridge: Wm. B. Eerdmans Publishing Company. ISBN 978-0802805201.
- Old, Hughes Oliphant (2002). Worship. Louisville, KY: Westminster John Knox Press. ISBN 978-0664225797.
- White, James F. (1989). Protestant Worship. Louisville, KY: Westminster/John Knox Press. ISBN 978-0664250379.
- Trocmé-Latter, Daniel (2015). The Singing of the Strasbourg Protestants, 1523-1541. Farnham: Ashgate. ISBN 978-1472432063.
