= Covenant renewal =

Covenant renewal may refer to:

- Covenant renewal at Mount Ebal, in the Hebrew Bible
- Covenant renewal at Shechem, in the Hebrew Bible
- Covenant Renewal Service, in the Methodist tradition
- Covenant renewal worship, in the Reformed tradition

== See also ==
- Covenant (religion)
- Covenant in Mormonism
