= Lectio Divina =

Traditional monastic practice

In Western Christianity, Lectio Divina (Latin for "Divine Reading") is a traditional monastic practice of scriptural reading, meditation and prayer intended to promote communion with God and to increase the knowledge of God's word. In the view of one commentator, it does not treat Scripture as texts to be studied, but as the living word.

Traditionally, Lectio Divina has four separate steps: read; meditate; pray; contemplate. First a passage of Scripture is read, then its meaning is reflected upon. This is followed by prayer and contemplation on the Word of God.

The focus of Lectio Divina is not a theological analysis of biblical passages but viewing them with Christ as the key to their meaning. For example, given Jesus' statement in John 14:27: "Peace I leave with you; my peace I give unto you", an analytical approach would focus on the reason for the statement during the Last Supper, the biblical context, etc. In Lectio Divina, however, the practitioner "enters" and shares the peace of Christ rather than "dissecting" it. In some Christian teachings, this form of meditative prayer is understood as leading to an increased knowledge of Christ.

The roots of scriptural reflection and interpretation go back to Origen in the 3rd century, after whom Ambrose taught them to Augustine of Hippo. The monastic practice of Lectio Divina was first established in the 6th century by Benedict of Nursia and was then formalized as a four-step process by the Carthusian monk Guigo II during the 12th century. In the 20th century, the constitution Dei verbum of the Second Vatican Council recommended Lectio Divina to the general public. Its importance was affirmed by Pope Benedict XVI at the start of the 21st century.

== History and development ==
=== Early beginnings ===
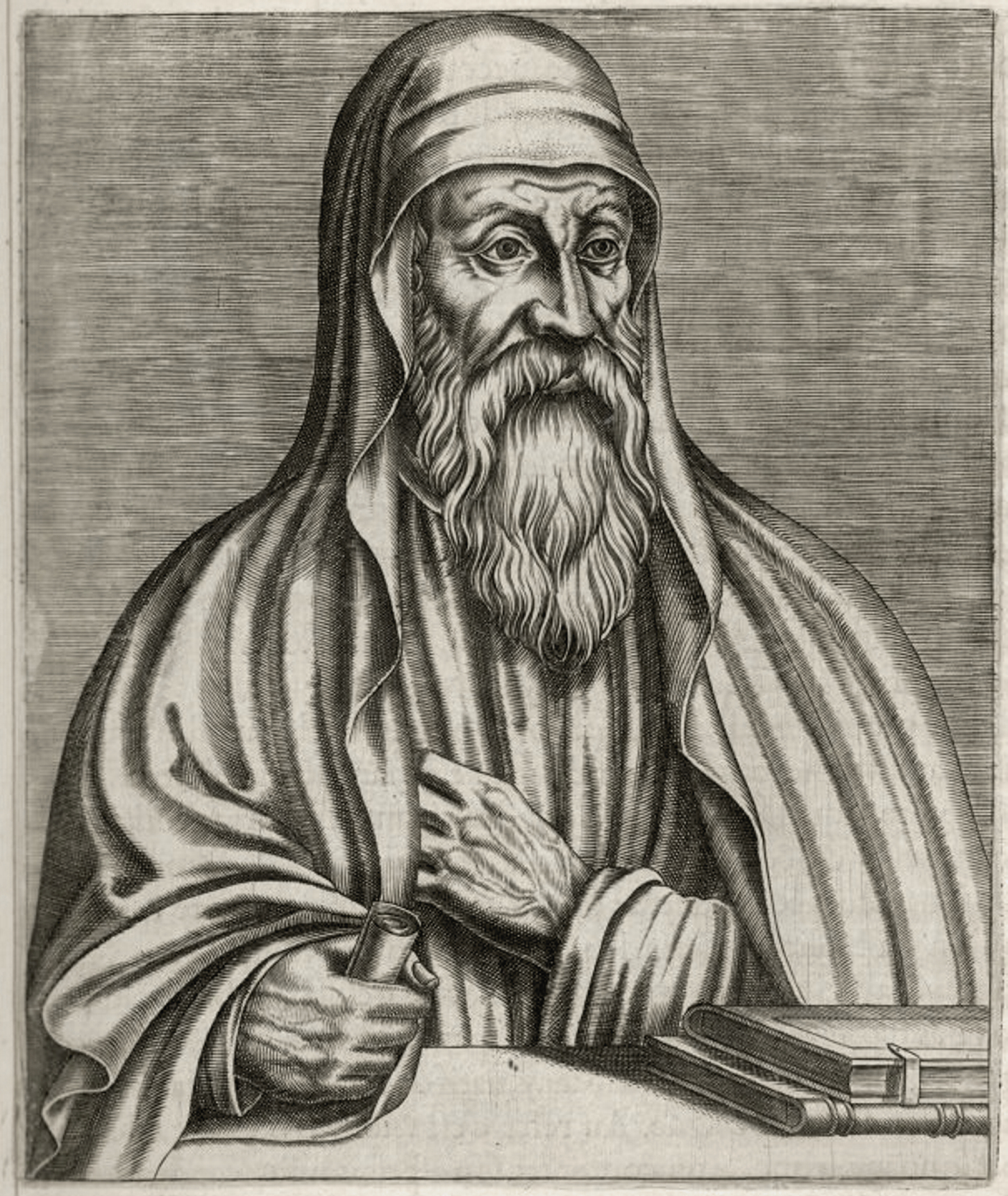
Origen considered the focus on Christ the key to interpreting Scripture.

Before the beginning of the Western monastic communities, a key contribution to the foundation of Lectio Divina came from Origen in the 3rd century, with his view of "Scripture as a sacrament". In a letter to Gregory of Neocaesarea Origen wrote: "[W]hen you devote yourself to the divine reading ... seek the meaning of divine words which is hidden from most people". Origen believed that The Word (i.e. Logos) was incarnate in Scripture and could therefore touch and teach readers and hearers. Origen taught that the reading of Scripture could help move beyond elementary thoughts and discover the higher wisdom hidden in the "Word of God".

In Origen's approach, the major interpretive element of Scripture is Christ. In his view all Scriptural texts are secondary to Christ and are only revelations in as much as they refer to Christ as The Word of God. In this view, using Christ as the "interpretive key" unlocks the message in Scriptural texts.

The "primordial role" of Origen in interpreting Scripture was acknowledged by Pope Benedict XVI. Origen's methods were then learned by Ambrose of Milan, who towards the end of the 4th century taught them to Saint Augustine, thereby introducing them into the monastic traditions of the Western Church thereafter.

In the 4th century, as the Desert Fathers began to seek God in the deserts of Palestine and Egypt, they produced early models of Christian monastic life that persisted in the Eastern Church. These early communities gave rise to the tradition of a Christian life of "constant prayer" in a monastic setting. Although the desert monks gathered to hear Scripture recited in public, and would then recite those words privately in their cells, sometimes meditating on them; this was not yet fully what later became Lectio Divina, since it did not necessarily involve a meditative step.

=== 6th- to 12th-century monasticism ===
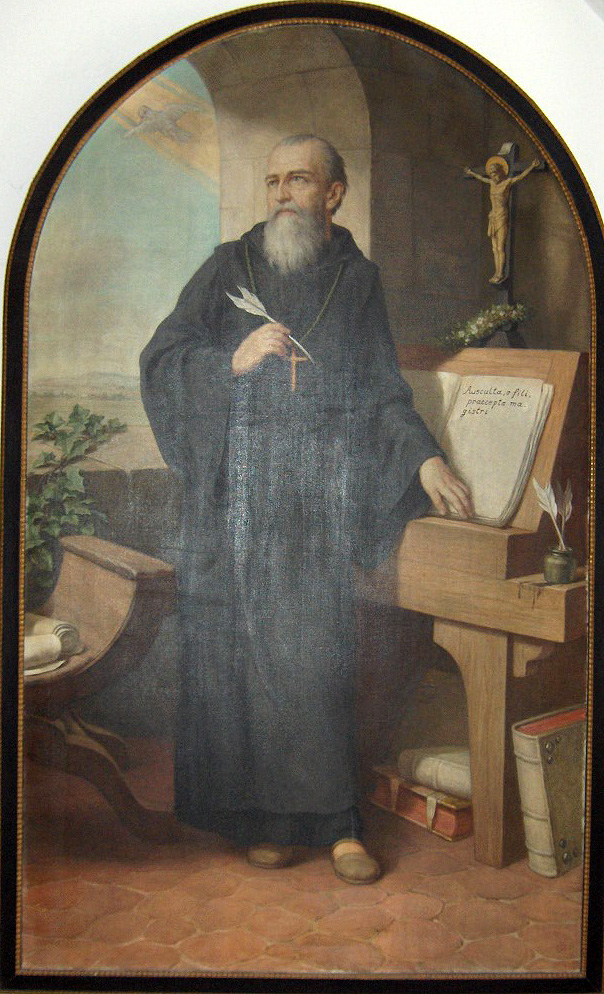
St. Benedict

After Origen, Church Fathers such as St. Ambrose, St. Augustine, and St. Hilary of Poitiers used the terms Lectio Divina and Lectio Sacra to refer to the reading of Scripture.

According to Jean Leclercq, OSB, the founders of the medieval tradition of Lectio Divina were Saint Benedict and Pope Gregory I. However, the methods that they employed had precedents in the biblical period both in Hebrew and Greek. A text that combines these traditions is Romans 10:8–10 where Apostle Paul refers to the presence of God's word in the believer's "mouth or heart". It was the recitation of the biblical text that provided the rationale for Lectio Divina.

With the motto Ora et labora ("Pray and work"), daily life in a Benedictine monastery consisted of three elements: liturgical prayer, manual labor and Lectio Divina, a quiet prayerful reading of the Bible. This slow and thoughtful reading of Scripture, and the ensuing pondering of its meaning, was their meditation. This spiritual practice is called "divine reading" or "spiritual reading" – i.e. lectio divina.

Benedict wrote "Idleness is the enemy of the soul. Therefore, the brethren should have specified periods of manual labor as well as for prayerful reading [lectio divina]." The Rule of Saint Benedict (chapter #48) stipulated specific times and manners for Lectio Divina. The entire community in a monastery was to take part in the readings during Sunday, except those who had other tasks to perform.

Early in the 12th century, Saint Bernard of Clairvaux was instrumental in re-emphasizing the importance of Lectio Divina within the Cistercian order. Bernard considered Lectio Divina and contemplation guided by the Holy Spirit the keys to nourishing Christian spirituality.

=== Formalization during the late 12th century ===
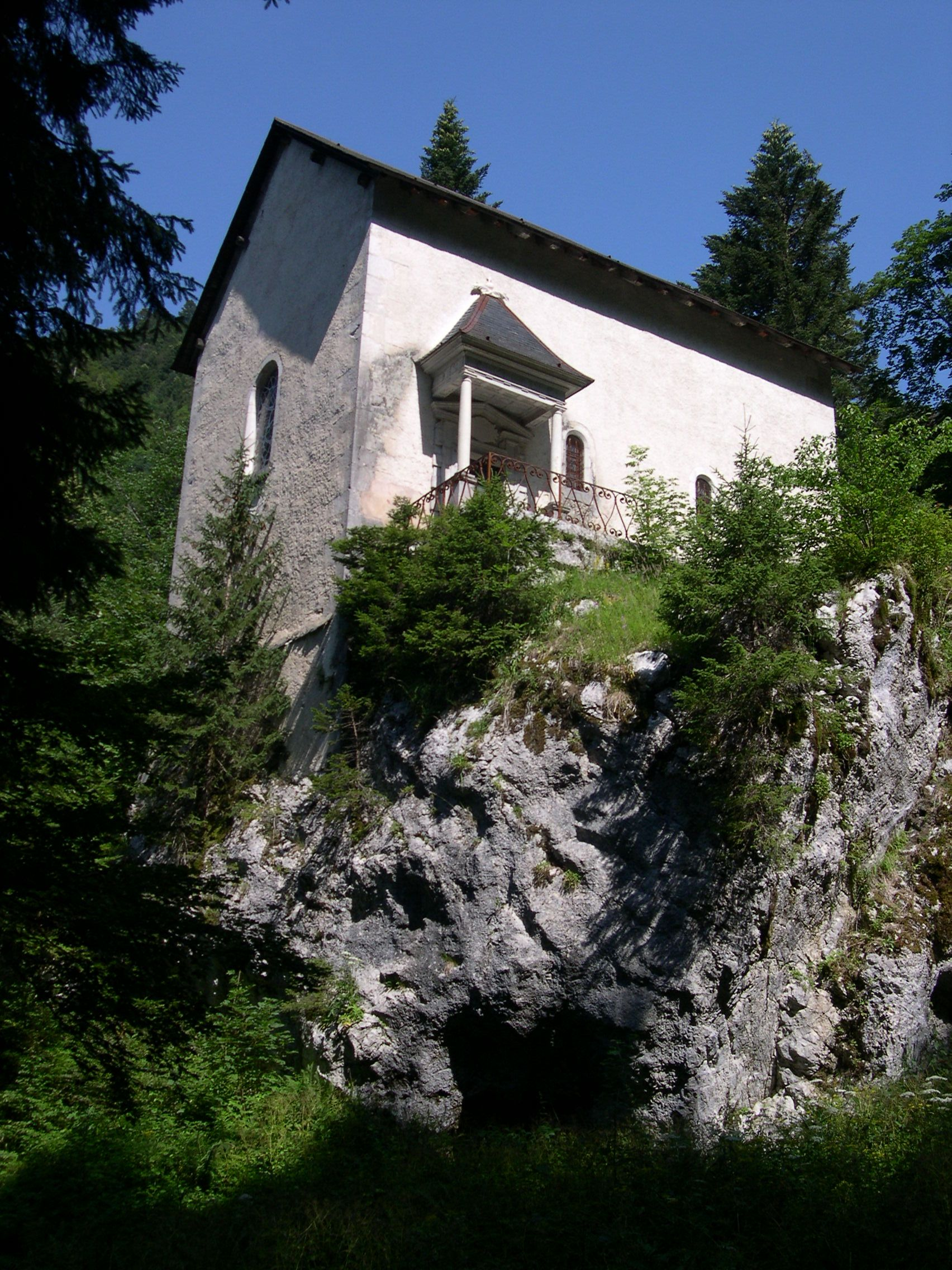
A chapel at Grande Chartreuse where Ladder of the Monk was written by Guigo II

Seek in reading and you will find in meditation; knock in prayer and it will be opened to you in contemplation — The four stages of Lectio Divina as taught by John of the Cross.

— Cunningham & Egan 1996, p. 88

The progression from Bible reading, to meditation, to prayer, to loving regard for God, was first formally described by Guigo II, a Carthusian monk and prior of Grande Chartreuse who died late in the 12th century. The Carthusian order follows its own Rule, called the Statutes, rather than the Rule of St Benedict.

Guigo II's book The Ladder of Monks is subtitled "a letter on the contemplative life" and is considered the first description of methodical prayer in the western mystical tradition. In Guigo's four stages one first reads, which leads to think about (i.e. meditate on) the significance of the text; that process in turn leads the person to respond in prayer as the third stage. The fourth stage is when the prayer, in turn, points to the gift of quiet stillness in the presence of God, called contemplation.

Guigo named the four steps of this "ladder" of prayer with the Latin terms lectio, meditatio, oratio, and contemplatio. In the 13th century the Carmelite Rule of St. Albert prescribed to Carmelites the daily prayerful pondering on the Word of God, namely to ruminate day and night the Divine Law. Lectio Divina alongside the daily celebration of liturgy is to this day the pillar of prayer in Carmel.

Lectio Divina was practiced by St. Dominic de Guzman, founder of the Dominican order.

In the 14th century, Gerard of Zutphen built on "Guigo's Ladder" to write his major work On Spiritual Ascents. Zutphen warned against considered meditation without reading of Scripture, and taught that the reading prepares the mind, so meditation will not fall into error. Similarly, he taught that meditation prepares the mind for contemplation.

=== 16th century ===
By the beginning of the 16th century, the methods of "methodical prayer" had reached Spain and St. John of the Cross taught the four stages of Guigo II to his monks. During the century, Protestant Reformers such as John Calvin continued to advocate the Lectio Divina. A Reformed version of the Lectio Divina was also popular among the Puritans: Richard Baxter, a Puritan theologian, championed the practice.

=== 20th- and 21st-century revival ===
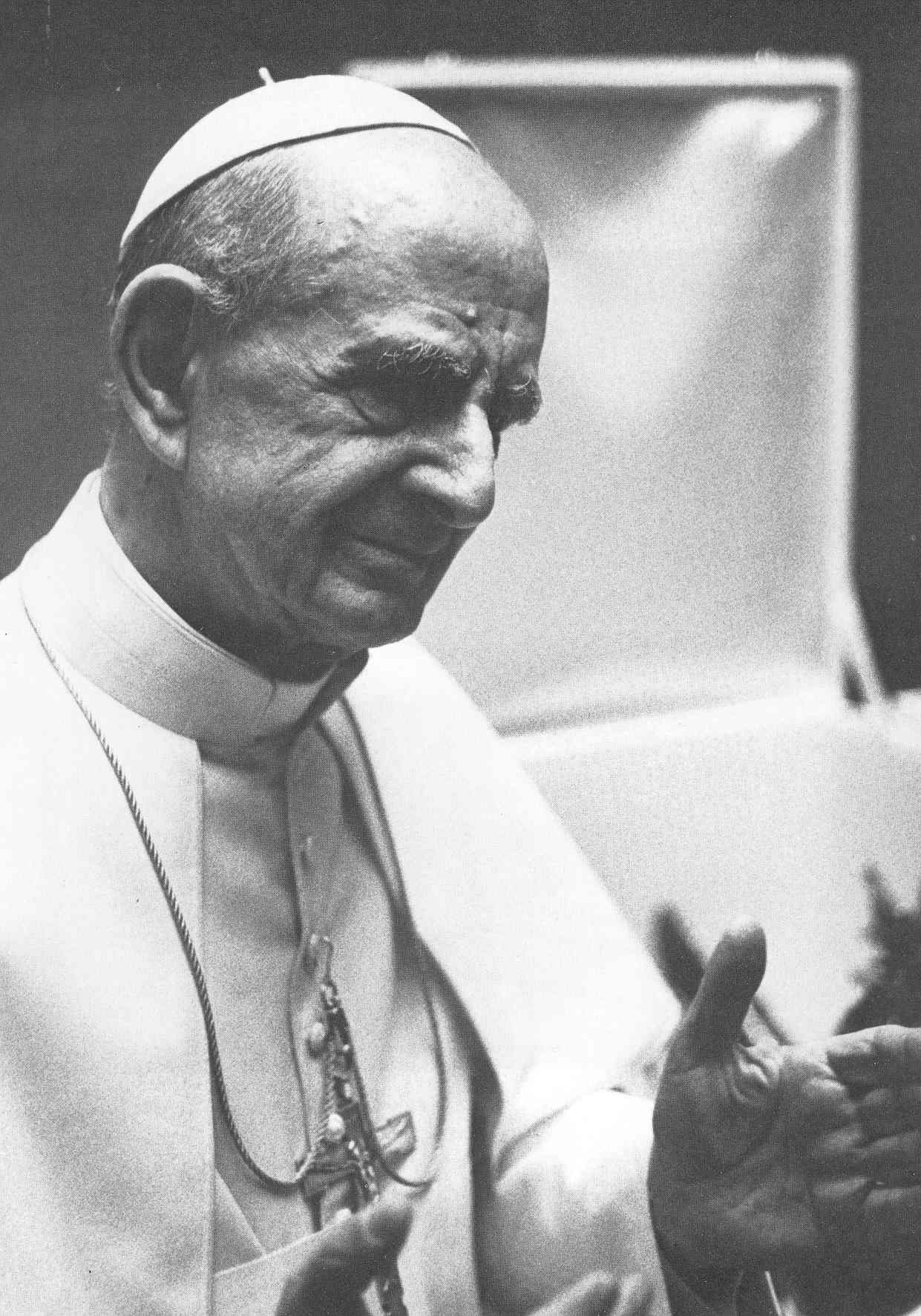
Pope Paul VI, who promulgated the Second Vatican Council's constitution Dei verbum

By the middle of 19th century, the historical critical approach to biblical analysis which had started over a century earlier, and focused on determining the historicity of gospel episodes, had taken away some of the emphasis on spreading Lectio Divina outside monastic communities. However, the early part of the 20th century witnessed a revival in the practice, and books and articles on Lectio Divina aimed at the general public began to appear by the middle of the century.

In 1965, one of the principal documents of the Second Vatican Council, the dogmatic constitution Dei verbum ("Word of God") emphasized the use of Lectio Divina. On the 40th anniversary of Dei verbum in 2005, Pope Benedict XVI reaffirmed its importance and stated:

I would like in particular to recall and recommend the ancient tradition of Lectio Divina: the diligent reading of Sacred Scripture accompanied by prayer brings about that intimate dialogue in which the person reading hears God who is speaking, and in praying, responds to him with trusting openness of heart [cf. Dei verbum, n. 25]. If it is effectively promoted, this practice will bring to the Church – I am convinced of it – a new spiritual springtime.

In his November 6, 2005 Angelus address, Benedict XVI emphasized the role of the Holy Spirit in Lectio Divina: In his annual Lenten addresses to the priests of the Diocese of Rome, Pope Benedict – mainly after the 2008 Synod of Bishops on the Bible – emphasized Lectio Divina's importance, as in 2012, when he used Ephesians 4:1–16 on a speech about certain problems facing the Church. Beforehand, he and Pope John Paul II had used a question-and-answer format. "One condition for Lectio Divina is that the mind and heart be illumined by the Holy Spirit, that is, by the same Spirit who inspired the Scriptures, and that they be approached with an attitude of 'reverential hearing'."

Since the latter part of the 20th century, the popularity of Lectio Divina has increased outside monastic circles and many lay Catholics, as well as some Protestants, practice it, at times keeping a "Lectio journal" in which they record their thoughts and contemplations after each session. The importance of Lectio Divina is stressed in the Anglican Communion as well.

== The four movements of Lectio Divina ==
Historically, Lectio Divina has been a "community practice" performed by monks in monasteries. Although it can be taken up individually, its community element should not be forgotten.

Lectio Divina has been likened to "feasting on the Word": first, the taking of a bite (lectio); then chewing on it (meditatio); savoring its essence (oratio) and, finally, "digesting" it and making it a part of the body (contemplatio). In Christian teachings, this form of meditative prayer leads to an increased knowledge of Christ.

Unlike meditative practices in Eastern Christianity – for instance, hesychasm, where the Jesus Prayer is repeated many times – Lectio Divina uses different Scripture passages at different times. Although a passage may be repeated a few times, Lectio Divina is not essentially repetitive in nature.

=== Lectio ("reading") ===
Hands on the Bible, Albrecht Dürer, 16th century

these are the things God has revealed to us by his Spirit. The Spirit searches all things, even the deep things of God

— 1 Corinthians 2:9–10.

The first step is the reading of Scripture. In order to achieve a calm and tranquil state of mind, preparation before Lectio Divina is recommended. The biblical reference for preparation via stillness is Psalm 46:10: "Be still, and know that I am God." An example would be sitting quietly and in silence and reciting a prayer inviting the Holy Spirit to guide the reading of the Scripture that is to follow.

The biblical basis for the preparation goes back to 1 Corinthians 2:9–10 which emphasizes the role of the Holy Spirit in revealing the Word of God. As in the statement by John the Baptist in John 1:26 that "in the midst of you standeth one whom ye know not," the preparatory step should open the mind to finding Christ in the passage being read.

Following the preparation the first movement of Lectio Divina is slow and gradual reading of the scriptural passage, perhaps several times. The biblical basis for the reading goes back to Romans 10:8–10 and the presence of God's word in the believer's "mouth or heart". The attentive reading begins the process through which a higher level of understanding can be achieved. In the traditional Benedictine approach the passage is slowly read four times, each time with a slightly different focus.

=== Meditatio ("meditation") ===
Although Lectio Divina involves reading, it is less a practice of reading than one of listening to the inner message of the Scripture delivered through the Holy Spirit. Lectio Divina does not seek information or motivation, but communion with God. It does not treat Scripture as text to be studied, but as the "Living Word".

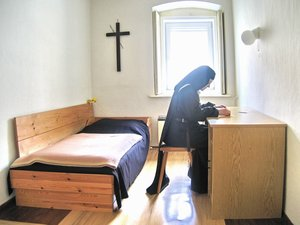
A Carmelite nun in her cell, meditating on the Bible

The second movement in Lectio Divina thus involves meditating upon and pondering on the scriptural passage. When the passage is read, it is generally advised not to try to assign a meaning to it at first, but to wait for the action of the Holy Spirit to illuminate the mind, as the passage is pondered upon.

The English word ponder comes from the Latin pondus which relates to the mental activity of weighing or considering. To ponder on the passage that has been read, it is held lightly and gently considered from various angles. Again, the emphasis is not on analysis of the passage but to keep the mind open and allow the Holy Spirit to inspire a meaning for it.

An example passage may be the statement by Jesus during the Last Supper in John 14:27: "Peace I leave with you; my peace I give unto you".

An analytical approach would focus on why Jesus said that, the fact that it was said at the Last Supper, and the context within the biblical episode. Other theological analysis may follow, e.g. the cost at which Jesus the Lamb of God provided peace through his obedience to the will of the Father, etc.

However, these theological analyses are generally avoided in Lectio Divina, where the focus is on Christ as the key that interprets the passage and relates it to the meditator. So rather than "dissecting peace" in an analytical manner, the practitioner of Lectio Divina "enters peace" and shares the peace of Christ. The focus will thus be on achieving peace via a closer communion with God rather than a biblical analysis of the passage. Similar other passages may be "Abide in my love", "I am the Good Shepherd", etc.

=== Oratio ("prayer") ===
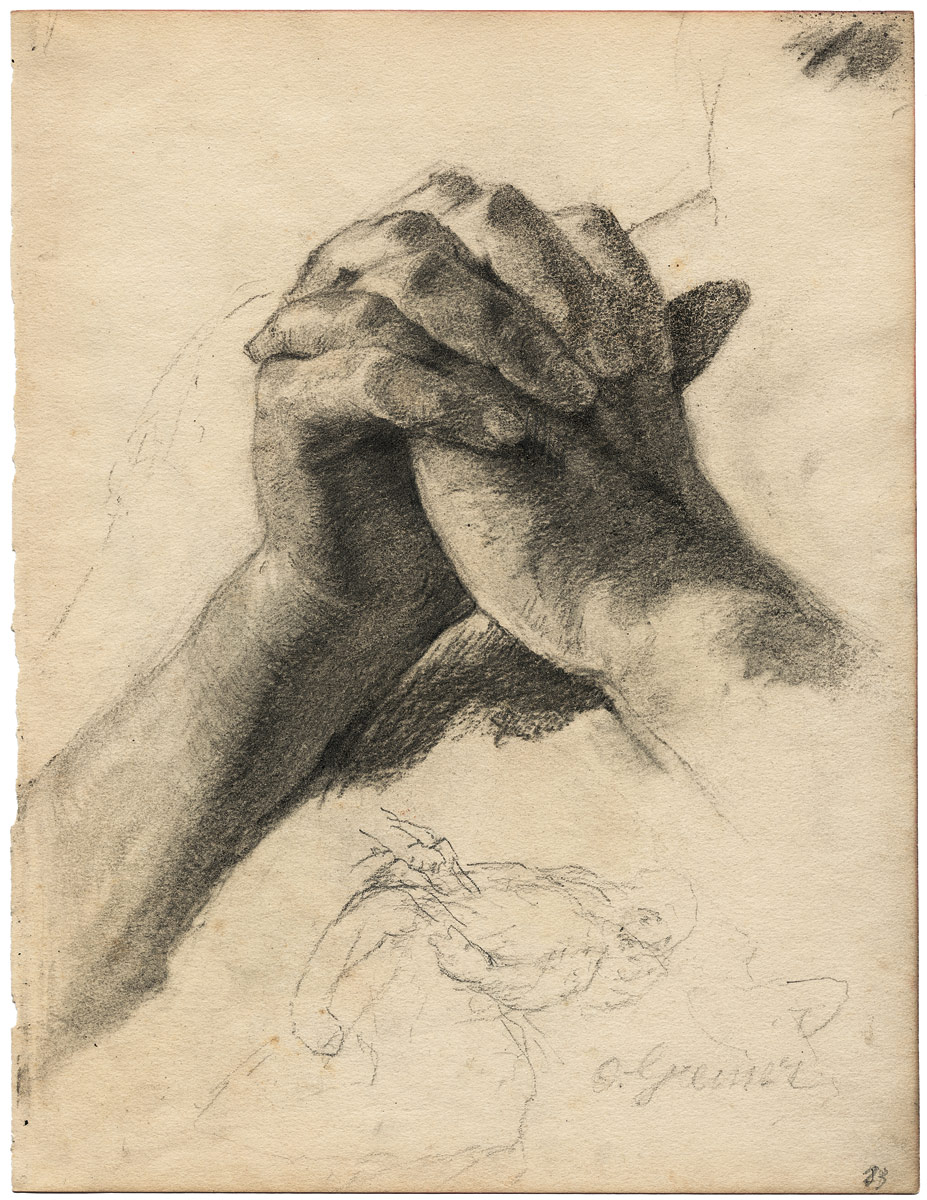
Hands in prayer by Otto Greiner, c. 1900

In the Christian tradition, prayer is understood as dialogue with God, that is, as loving conversation with God who has invited us into an embrace. The constitution Dei verbum which endorsed Lectio Divina for the general public, as well as in monastic settings, quoted Saint Ambrose on the importance of prayer in conjunction with Scripture reading and stated:

And let them remember that prayer should accompany the reading of Sacred Scripture, so that God and man may talk together; for "we speak to Him when we pray; we hear Him when we read the divine saying."

Pope Benedict XVI emphasized the importance of using Lectio Divina and prayers on Scripture as a guiding light and a source of direction and stated "It should never be forgotten that the Word of God is a lamp for our feet and a light for our path."

=== Contemplatio ("contemplation") ===
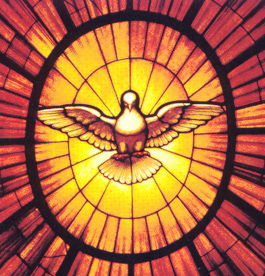
Stained glass of the Holy Spirit as a dove, c. 1660

Contemplation takes place in terms of silent prayer that expresses love for God. The Catechism of the Catholic Church defines contemplative prayer as "the hearing the Word of God" in an attentive mode. It states "Contemplative prayer is silence, the 'symbol of the world to come' or 'silent love.' Words in this kind of prayer are not speeches; they are like kindling that feeds the fire of love. In this silence, unbearable to the 'outer' man, the Father speaks to us his incarnate Word, who suffered, died, and rose; in this silence the Spirit of adoption enables us to share in the prayer of Jesus."

The role of the Holy Spirit in contemplative prayer has been emphasized by Christian spiritual writers for centuries. In the 12th century, Saint Bernard of Clairvaux compared the Holy Spirit to a kiss by the Eternal Father which allows the practitioner of contemplative prayer to experience union with God. In the 14th century, Richard Rolle viewed contemplation as the path that leads the soul to union with God in love, and considered the Holy Spirit as the center of contemplation.

From a theological perspective, God's grace is considered a principle, or cause, of contemplation, with its benefits delivered through the gifts of the Holy Spirit.

== Other Christian methods ==
Table 1
Guigo II	Clare of Assisi
Read (lectio)	Gaze on the Cross (intueri)
Meditate (meditatio)	Consider (considerare)
Pray (oratio)	Contemplate (contemplari)
Contemplate (contemplatio)	Imitate (imitare)

While the Lectio Divina has been the key method of meditation and contemplation within the Benedictine, Cistercian and Carthusian orders, other Catholic religious orders have used other methods.

An example is another four-step approach, that by Saint Clare of Assisi shown in the Table 1, which is used by the Franciscan order. Saint Clare's method is more visual than Guigo II's which seems more intellectual in comparison.

Saint Teresa of Avila's method of "recollection" which uses book passages to keep focus during meditation has similarities to the way Lectio Divina uses a specific Scriptural passage as the centerpiece of a session of meditation and contemplation. It is likely that Teresa did not initially know of Guigo II's methods, although she may have been indirectly influenced by those teachings via the works of Francisco de Osuna which she studied in detail.

== See also ==
- Christian meditation
- Imaginative contemplation (Ignatian spiritual exercise)
- A Simple Way to Pray by Martin Luther
- Midrash
- Ladder of Divine Ascent
- Lectio continua
- Lectio Sacra
