= Lukas Vischer (theologian) =

Swiss Reformed ecumenical Christian (1926–2008)

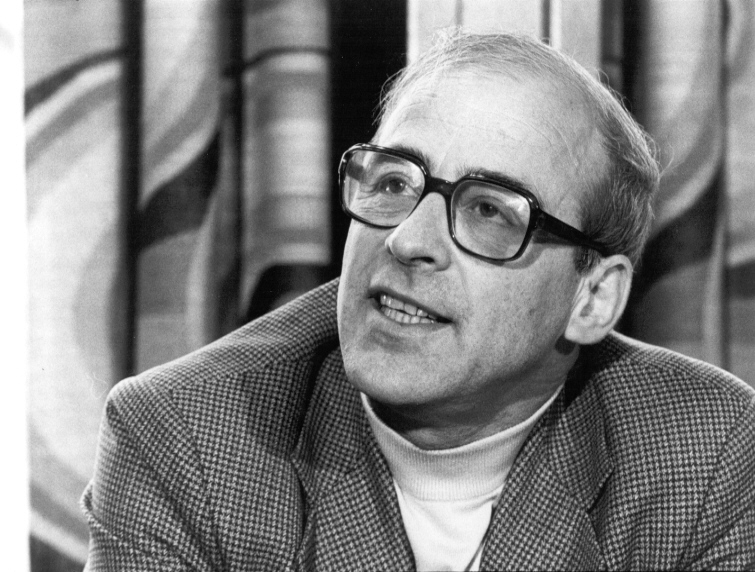
- Born: 23 November 1926; Basel, Switzerland
- Died: 11 March 2008 (aged 81); Geneva, Switzerland
- Spouse: Barbara Schmidt (m. 1953)
- Children: 4

Lukas Vischer (23 November 1926 – 11 March 2008) was a Swiss Reformed theologian. From 1961 he was research secretary of the World Council of Churches’ (WCC) Faith and Order Commission in Geneva and from 1966 until 1979 the commission’s director. From 1980 until 1992 he headed the Protestant Office for Ecumenism in Switzerland and taught Ecumenical Theology at the Theological Faculty of the University of Bern. From 1982 until 1989 he was moderator of the World Alliance of Reformed Churches' (WARC) Theology department and from 1982 until 2008 moderator of the John Knox International Reformed Centre’s Programme Commission in Geneva. In these years, ecological responsibility of the Churches became a focal point of his work.

== Life and work ==
=== Early years in Basel 1926–1953 ===
Lukas Vischer's family on both sides played a part in public life in Switzerland. Born on 23 November 1926, he grew up in Basel as the youngest of four children and attended the Humanist Grammar School ("Humanistisches Gymnasium") there. After a trial semester of law and history, from 1946 Vischer studied theology at the Universities of Basel, Strasbourg and Göttingen. He completed his tertiary education with a term in Oxford and a doctoral thesis with Oscar Cullmann on the Church Father Basil the Great (1953).

=== Parish ministry in Herblingen/Schaffhausen 1953–1961 ===
In 1953, Lukas Vischer married doctor of law Dr Barbara Schmidt and began his ministry in the parish of Herblingen near Schaffhausen where their four children were born. In the Canton of Schaffhausen Vischer became involved in the inner-Protestant beginnings of what would become the Working Group of Christian Churches in Switzerland and became a delegate to the Federation of Swiss Protestant Churches’ Ecumenical Commission.

Alongside his parish duties, Vischer completed his post-doctoral thesis ("Habilitation") "The Interpretation History of 1 Cor 6:11. Waiver of Right and Mediation" in 1955 (original German title: "Die Auslegungsgeschichte von 1. Kor. 6,1-11. Rechtsverzicht und Schlichtung").

In 1956, Vischer made contact with the World Council of Churches (WCC) in view of the WCC's Central Committee meeting in Hungary. His aim was to point out the suppression of church representatives in Hungary. The WCC hired him as a translator for the meeting. Soon after this, Vischer received his first official post as tutor of the graduate school of the Ecumenical Institute Bossey near Geneva. Following nomination by WCC General Secretary Willem Adolf Visser ’t Hooft, Vischer was elected to become Research Secretary in the WCC Faith and Order Commission (1960).

=== World Council of Churches (WCC) in Geneva 1961–1979 ===
The start of Lukas Vischer’s work for the WCC coincided with the 3rd WCC Assembly in New Delhi 1961. This Assembly changed the ecumenical movement considerably: The International Missionary Council (IMC) and the WCC united; the Orthodox Churches of Russia, Bulgaria, Romania and Poland joined and created an important Orthodox presence; several “young” Churches in the southern hemisphere widened the international spectrum, and observers of the Roman Catholic Church attended an assembly for the first time.

The main objective of the Faith and Order Commission, where Lukas Vischer served as Research Secretary and from 1966 as Director, was: “The movement for Faith and Order is an integral part of the World Council of Churches. Its aim has always been ‘to proclaim the unity of the Church of Jesus Christ and to call the churches to the goal of visible unity’. This goal is mainly being pursued through study programmes which engage with those theological questions which divide the Churches. […] The main working method of Faith and Order are consultations in all parts of the world where issues which divide Churches are discussed and examined. […] Responsible for the organisation of these consultations and the publication of the results of these meetings is the Secretariat of the Faith and Order Commission at the World Council of Churches in Geneva.”

=== Ecumenical relations ===
==== Leuenberg Concord – church unions – world confessional bodies ====
Soon after Lukas Vischer began working in Geneva, he was asked to accompany the conversations between Lutherans and Reformed, which had started in 1955, on a European level. It was declared that the condemnations of the past “no longer related to today’s teaching”. In 1973 the Leuenberg Concord was adopted after ten years of work and ratified by the governing bodies of the participating Churches. This led to the formation of the Communion of Protestant Churches in Europe (CPCE) in 2003.

Accompanying advice at negotiations of church unions was also part of the work of Faith and Order as well as the relations with the world confessional bodies and their bilateral dialogues – the contact to the world confessional bodies had the aim to integrate their activities into the ecumenical movement.

==== Relations with Orthodox Churches ====
For the WCC Lukas Vischer maintained relations with the Orthodox Churches of Russia, Serbia, Bulgaria, Poland and Armenia and with the Ecumenical Patriarch Athenagoras I. In later years the relationship with Patriarch Ilia II of Georgia became especially important to him. Relationships with Communist Eastern Europe included persistent advocacy for human rights and freedom of religion. In the context of Russia, cooperation with the representative of the Moscow Patriarch at the WCC, the Russian Orthodox theologian Vitaly Borovoy, was of particular importance. In 1964 Lukas Vischer organised together with Vitaly Borovoy and other Orthodox colleagues a dialogue between theologians of the Eastern and Oriental Orthodox traditions with the aim to work to overcome the 1,500-year-old schism.

==== The Second Vatican Council and the Relationship with the Roman Catholic Church ====
Lukas Vischer came to international attention as the WCC’s official observer at the Second Vatican Council 1962–1965. In those days, the Roman Catholic Church opened itself up for cooperation with other Churches through the Decree on Ecumenism. The “Joint Working Group” of the WCC and the Roman Catholic Church began its work in 1965 and Lukas Vischer was one of its two Secretaries until 1979. The Group explored questions of the relationship between Unity and Authority as well as Catholicity and Apostolicity in the Church and produced annual material for the Week of Prayer for Christian Unity.

==== Ecumenical Assemblies and Studies on Church Unity ====
===== Unity of All in each Place =====
The WCC General Assembly in New Delhi 1961 was of special importance because of its Statement on Unity. The Statement speaks of a “fully committed fellowship” of “all in each place”, who are united through being “baptized into Jesus Christ” and “breaking the one bread”, through confessing him as “Lord and Saviour” and through “holding the one apostolic faith”, through “preaching the one gospel” and “joining in common prayer” and through “having a corporate life reaching out in witness and service to all”. And “at the same time [they] are united with the whole Christian fellowship in all places and all ages in such wise that ministry and members are accepted by all, and that all can act and speak together as occasion requires for the tasks to which God calls his people.” It remained open how this was to be achieved.

Convinced that to achieve a fully committed fellowship one could learn lessons from the methods of the early Christian Councils, Lukas Vischer initiated, whilst still in New Delhi, research work on the Councils.

The Patristic Study Group, a group with strong Orthodox participation, began its work in 1962. The New Delhi Unity Formula was further expanded at the Fourth World Conference on Faith and Order 1963 in Montreal and at the commission’s conference in Aarhus in 1964.

==== Baptism, Eucharist and Ministry and other Studies ====
The work on Ministry and the Sacraments has been part of Faith and Order’s agenda since the first World Conference in 1927. It was one of Lukas Vischer’s roles to continue with this. The Commission’s approach to the division at the Eucharist is reflected in the Report of the Section on Unity in New Delhi 1961: "Wherever existing convictions allow for a more direct progress towards intercommunion between Churches, it should be made without waiting for consensus and common action in the ecumenical movement as a whole." In the question of Ministry, church traditions also lay rather far apart, but during the study process a remarkable convergence in theological positions was achieved. It was important to Lukas Vischer to have a broad consultation process in order to facilitate the adoption of the paper by the member churches. Shortly after his resignation from the WCC, the Convergence Declaration “Baptism, Eucharist and Ministry” was adopted at the commission’s plenary meeting in Lima in 1982.

Further studies in these years related to tradition and traditions; the authority of the Bible; the Council of Chalcedon and its significance for the ecumenical movement; worship today; Spirit, order and organisation as well as common witness and proselytism.

==== Unity of the Church – Unity of Mankind ====
In light of a humankind torn apart by racism, poverty, injustice, war and revolutionary violence, the WCC General Assembly in Uppsala 1968 drew up a vision of Church as a symbol of the coming unity of mankind. It described "unity of all Christians in each place" as a "truly universal, ecumenical, conciliar form of the common life and witness." "The members of the World Council of Churches, committed to each other, should work for the time when a genuinely universal council will again speak for all Christians, and lead the way into the future."

In 1971 – three years later – Lukas Vischer notes in the preface of the report of the Faith and Order conference in Louvain: “The Louvain meeting may well be seen as a decisive turning point in the history of the Faith and Order movement. […] [Because] here the Commission discussed the question of unity for the first time in new contexts. It was clear that the unity of the Church is no longer called into question by confessional differences alone. The Churches must bring to fruition the fellowship given them in Christ amidst the debates of the present. How can they be signs of the presence of Christ today? This question can only be answered if the Churches deal decisively with the theological questions that arise from the present situation in the world. Above all, it can only be answered if they seek once more to give account of their raison d'être, of that which makes them to be the Church.”

In the years that followed the comprehensive study “Unity of the Church – Unity of Mankind” developed this insight further. For this work they sought to enhance cooperation with other departments of the WCC. Examples are the studies about the role of people with disabilities and about the communion of women and men in the Church.

In view of worldwide injustice, in 1968 Lukas Vischer developed together with Max Geiger and André Biéler the concept for development policy “Berne Declaration” (today: “Public Eye”). His public advocacy against apartheid and for the WCC’s anti racism programme resulted in Vischer’s expulsion by the apartheid regime in 1974.

Interreligious questions were now also viewed in the context of Unity of Mankind. In 1968 Vischer organised the first WCC Muslim-Christian dialogue in Cartigny near Geneva. The Churches “have to ask themselves […] how God is present in the history of the whole of mankind, how especially the role of different religions and ideologies is to be understood in the context of God’s story”.

==== Conciliar Fellowship ====
The concept of "conciliar fellowship" became official at the 5th WCC General Assembly in Nairobi 1975: "The one Church is to be envisioned as a conciliar fellowship of local churches which are themselves truly united. In this conciliar fellowship, each local church possesses, in communion with others, the fullness of catholicity [...]"

From the beginnings, not only witness and service were of high importance to the ecumenical movement, but also prayer. The Assembly suggested therefore to encourage prayers of Churches and congregations from around the world for each other. In 1978 Faith and Order created The Ecumenical Prayer Cycle to support congregations in this.

==== Account of the Hope ====
In order to "make the confessional form of the quest for unity visible", Lukas Vischer initiated the study "Giving account of the hope that is in us" (1971). Christians and church groups in many countries participated in a process with testimonies of their specific hope that took many years. The resulting confessional text was adopted by the Faith and Order World Conference 1978 in Bangalore. This study "set a landmark" in the history of the commission, said WCC General Secretary Emilio Castro looking back. Looking ahead: In 1983 Lukas Vischer was no longer serving at the WCC, but he was greatly committed to the "Conciliar Process of Mutual Commitment (Covenant) for Justice, Peace, and the Integrity of Creation" of the 6th WCC Assembly in Vancouver. He was a member of the WCC's working group on climate and continued to follow the development of the WCC with great interest.

=== Protestant Office for Ecumenism in Switzerland and Professor in Bern 1980-1992 ===
After Lukas Vischer had left the WCC, the Protestant Office for Ecumenism in Switzerland was created, situated in the offices of the Federation of Swiss Protestant Churches in Bern (since 2020: Protestant Church in Switzerland). The management of the Protestant Office for Ecumenism and the newly created chair of Ecumenical Theology at the University of Bern offered Vischer the opportunity to put his international experience to good use in Switzerland.

For the Federation of Swiss Protestant Churches, he wrote a statement on the WCC convergence texts on "Baptism, Eucharist and Ministry" and – on occasion of the planned Papal visit in 1981 – the memorandum "The Protestant Churches in Switzerland in the Ecumenical Movement" (original German title: "Die evangelischen Kirchen der Schweiz in der ökumenischen Bewegung"). He founded the Working Group on Orthodoxy and established bilateral relations between the Federation of Swiss Protestant Churches and the Orthodox Churches in Russia and Georgia, with the China Christian Council and with Reformed Churches in South Korea. In 1988 he was one of the founders of the Swiss Association of the Friends of Georgia ("Vereinigung der Freunde Georgiens"). As board member of the Swiss section (founded in 1981) of the "Action des Chrétiens pour l'Abolition de la Torture" (ACAT), Vischer dealt with the violation of human rights worldwide.

The publication "Texte der Evangelischen Arbeitsstelle Ökumene Schweiz" and other papers from the Protestant Office for Ecumenism in Switzerland for use in parishes informed Swiss Churches and congregations about the relevance of international gatherings and encouraged further work. Lukas Vischer was a sought-after speaker and dialogue partner for the media, congregations and church bodies in Switzerland.

Regarding the renewal of the Protestant Churches in Switzerland, he was involved in the leadership of the grassroots movement Swiss Protestant Synod ("Schweizerische Evangelische Synode") from 1983 until 1987, which explored ecumenically relevant issues like Denomination, Covenant for Justice, Peace and Integrity of Creation, Renewal of Worship and Christians in a wealthy country.

As professor of Ecumenical Theology at the University of Bern, Vischer discussed topics which were relevant for the ecumenical movement at the time and sought to cooperate with colleagues on topics like aspects of an ecologically responsible way of life; Unity of the Church in the New Testament; Israel and Palestine, as well as how to present church history in an ecumenical perspective. A meeting about the latter resulted in the project of an Ecumenical Church History in Switzerland.

=== World Alliance of Reformed Churches 1982–1989 ===
At the World Alliance of Reformed Churches’ General Assembly in Ottawa 1982 (WARC; since 2010: World Communion of Reformed Churches (WCRC)), Lukas Vischer was elected moderator of the WARC Theology department. At the time, the WARC was situated in the Ecumenical Centre in Geneva. Until the next General Assembly in Seoul 1989, he put four topics in the focus of his work:

- 1) the WARC's contribution to the Conciliar Process for Justice, Peace and Integrity of Creation;
- 2) the Confession of the Reformed Churches (study "Called to Witness to the Gospel Today");
- 3) Mission and Unity:
- 4) Reformed Worship.

He also supported bilateral dialogues with other Protestant world federations as well as with the Roman Catholic Church and Orthodoxy.

His work as moderator of the Programme Commission of the John Knox International Reformed Centre in Geneva (1982-2008) enabled him to use the Centre as a venue for international conferences of the WARC and to publish the “John Knox Series”.

=== The Ecological Responsibility of the Churches ===
In 1975–1978, Lukas Vischer had already been involved in two forums of the Working Group of Christian Churches in Switzerland for a "new way of life". Since the 1980s, Vischer had been a driving force for the “Conciliar Process of Mutual Commitment (Covenant) for Justice, Peace and Integrity of Creation” on many levels. This process was launched at the WARC General Assembly in Ottawa 1982. The WCC adopted the idea at the 1983 Assembly in Vancouver and appointed the World Convocation of Seoul in 1990. Lukas Vischer also contributed hugely to the 1st European Ecumenical Assembly in Basel 1989 and to the 2nd European Ecumenical Assembly in Graz 1997.

The worry about the integrity of God's creation and solidarity with the victims of climate change received little attention within the Churches compared with human-centric topics like peace and justice. This is the reason why Vischer put the focus of his personal work on theology of creation and the Churches' ecological responsibility. With the support of the Swiss Protestant Synod, the organisation "OekU Kirche und Umwelt" (Church and Environment; now: "OekU Kirchen für die Umwelt" [Churches for the Environment]) was created in 1986. Vischer was also involved in the development of the WCC's programme on climate change. At the 2nd European Ecumenical Assembly in Graz 1997, Vischer advocated with others the proposal to create specific structures for the ecological witness of the Churches on a European level. The European Christian Environmental Network (ECEN) was created in 1998. ECEN propagates the introduction of a "Time for Creation" in the church year from 1 September until 4 October, among other ecological measures.

=== Final Projects: Témoigner ensemble à Genève and Calvin Jubilee ===
With the aim to strengthen unity on a local level and with the support by the John Knox International Reformed Centre, Lukas Vischer initiated the movement “Témoigner Ensemble à Genève” (Witnessing the Faith together in Geneva). In this movement, more than 60 migrant congregations were connected with Geneva congregations. Its first public meeting on 20 May 2007 brought together around 3,000 people outside St Pierre Cathedral for a festival.

In view of the Calvin Jubilee 2009, Lukas Vischer advocated – now in his eighties – on a local, national and international level for a representation of the Geneva Reformer which is relevant for today’s context and not for one that is historicising. Vischer’s written contributions to Calvin’s view on unity of the Church, social justice, a responsible handling of God's creation and holiness of life in times of armed conflicts have been published jointly by the WARC and the John Knox International Reformed Centre with the title "Das Vermächtnis Johannes Calvins – Denkanstöße und Handlungsvorschläge für die Kirche im 21. Jahrhundert".

=== Death ===
Lukas Vischer died on 11 March 2008 in Geneva. He was laid to rest at the cemetery of Soglio in the Canton of Grisons, Switzerland.

== Honours ==
Honorary Doctorates:

- 1969 Charles University Prague
- 1977 University of Fribourg
- 1995 Debrecen Reformed Theological University
- 2000 Gáspár Károli University of the Reformed Church in Hungary
- 2007 University of Geneva

Other:

- 1980 Science Prize of the City of Basel

== Selection of Works ==
- Basilius der Grosse. Untersuchungen zu einem Kirchenvater des vierten Jahrhunderts, Dissertation, Basel 1953 (in German).
- Die Auslegungsgeschichte von 1. Kor. 6,1-11, Rechtsverzicht und Schlichtung, Habilitation, Tübingen 1955 (in German).
- Ökumenische Skizzen, Zwölf Beiträge, Frankfurt am Main 1972.
- Johannes Feiner/Lukas Vischer (ed.): The Common Catechism: A Book of Christian Faith, New York 1975 (https://archive.org/details/commoncatechismb0000unse/mode/2up).
- Veränderung der Welt – Bekehrung der Kirchen. Denkanstösse der Fünften Vollversammlung des Ökumenischen Rates der Kirchen in Nairobi, Frankfurt am Main 1976, pp. 83-106 (in German).
- Intercession, Geneva 1980 (https://archive.org/details/intercession0000visc).
- Spirit of God, Spirit of Christ: Ecumenical Reflections on the Filioque Controversy, Faith and Order Paper No. 103, Geneva 1981 (https://archive.org/details/wccfops2.110/mode/2up).
- Das heimliche Ja, Worte zum Sonntag, Zürich 1987 (in German).
- Karin Bredull Gerschwiler/Andreas Karrer/Christian Link/Jan Milic Lochman/Heinz Rüegger (ed.): Gottes Bund gemeinsam bezeugen, Aufsätze zu Themen der ökumenischen Bewegung, Göttingen 1992 (in German).
- Lukas Vischer/Lukas Schenker/Rudolf Dellsperger (ed): Ökumenische Kirchengeschichte der Schweiz, Fribourg (Switzerland)/Basel 1994 (in German).
- Arbeit in der Krise, Theologische Orientierungen, Neukirchen-Vluyn 1996 (in German).
- Jean Jacques Bauswein /Lukas Vischer (ed.), The Reformed Family Worldwide: A Survey of Reformed Churches, Theological Schools, and International Organizations, William B. Eerdmans Publishing Company Grand Rapids, Michigan/Cambridge, U.K., 1999.
- Verantwortliche Gesellschaft? Über Zukunftsfähigkeit, Solidarität und Menschenrechte, Neukirchen-Vluyn 2001(in German).
- Die Konvergenztexte über Taufe, Abendmahl und Amt, Wie sind sie entstanden? Was haben sie gebracht? In: Internationale Kirchliche Zeitschrift, Year 92, Juli/September 2002/3, pp. 139–178 (in German).
- Christian Worship in Reformed Churches Past and Present, Grand Rapids 2003.
- Listening to Creation Groaning: Report and Papers from a Consultation on Creation Theology organised by the European Christian Environmental Network (ECEN) at the John Knox International Reformed Center from March 28 to April 1 2004, Geneva 2004.
- The Legacy of John Calvin, Some actions for the Church in the 21st Century, Geneva 2008.
- Tamara Grdzelidze/Martin George/Lukas Vischer (ed.): Witness through Troubled Times: A History of the Orthodox Church of Georgia, 1811 to the Present, London 2006.
- Commemorating Witnesses and Martyrs of the Past: A Reformed Perspective, Geneva 2006.
- Lukas Vischer/Christian Link/Ulrich Luz (ed.): Ökumene im Neuen Testament und heute, Göttingen 2009 (in German).

=== About Lukas Vischer ===
- Andreas Karrer: Lukas Vischer (* 1926), in: Stephan Leimgruber/Max Schoch (ed.): Gegen die Gottvergessenheit, Schweizer Theologen im 19. und 20. Jahrhundert, Basel 1990, pp. 521-538 (in German).
- Karin Bredull Gerschwiler/Andreas Karrer/Christian Link/Jan Milic Lochman/Heinz Rüegger (ed.): Ökumenische Theologie in den Herausforderungen der Gegenwart, Lukas Vischer zum 65. Geburtstag, Göttingen 1991 (in German).
- Geiko Müller-Fahrenholz: Ein prophetischer Zeuge, Zum 75. Geburtstag von Lukas Vischer, Evangelische Theologie Year. 72, 2002/2, pp. 123-136 (in German).
- Michael Quisinsky: Ökumenische Perspektiven auf Konzil und Konziliarität, Lukas Vischer und die Vision eines “universalen Konzils“, in: Catholica, Vierteljahresschrift für ökumenische Theologie 66, Year 4, 2012, pp. 241-253 (in German).

== Books ==
- The Common Catechism: A Book of Christian Faith, 1975. ISBN 0-8164-0283-3
- Intercession, 1980. ISBN 2-8254-0634-1
- Spirit of God, Spirit of Christ: Ecumenical Reflections on the Filioque Controversy, 1981. ISBN 0-281-03820-1
- Christian Worship in Reformed Churches Past and Present, 2003. ISBN 0-8028-0520-5
- Commemorating Witnesses and Martyrs of the Past: A Reformed Perspective, 2006. ISBN 2-8254-1482-4
