= Lectio Sacra =

In Christianity, Lectio Sacra is a Latin term meaning sacred reading which refer to the reading of Scripture.

Church Fathers such as St. Jerome, St. Ambrose, St. Augustine, and St. Hilary of Poitiers had used the term to refer to the reading of Scripture. It was also used along with the term Lectio Divina which included a more meditative aspect and was used by St. Benedict in his Rule.

By the time of the Protestant Reformation the term Lectio Sacra was used to refer to the public reading and lectures on the scriptures - often directed against the "heretics." These Lectio Sacra lectures were often delivered in Latin in the churches of larger towns, at times twice a week.

== See also ==
- Lectio continua
- Lectio divina
- Lectio scriptura
