= Musaeus of Marseilles =

Greek priest

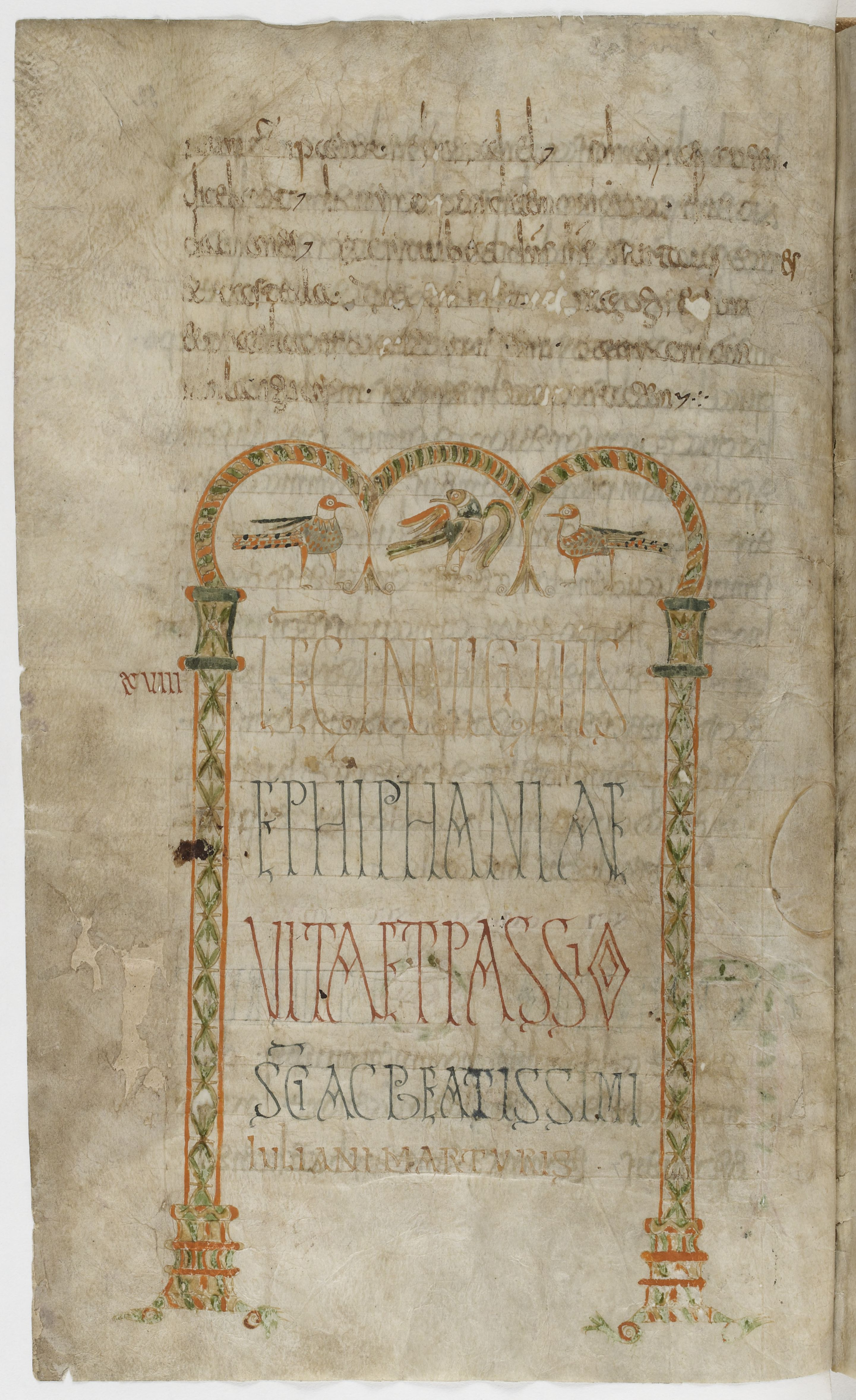
The Luxeuil Lectionary, a masterpiece of Merovingian illumination (700)

Musaeus of Marseilles (fl. c. 450) was a priest from Massilia. According to Gennadius, he died "during the reign of Leo and Majorian", between 457 and 461. We know very little about his life.

Apparently a prolific writer, he was also an esteemed preacher whose sermons were read for edification. We know that he put together a lectionary for Venerius, bishop of Marseilles, around 450 CE, and that he also prepared a responsorial and a sacramentary. The sacramentary was a "sort of plenary missal", and is the earliest known of its kind.

== Biography ==
Musaeus was active before the middle of the 5th century CE. He was born in Massilia, once part of a Greek colony in southern France. In a passage of his De Viris Illustribus, Gennadius described him thusly:

Musaeus, priest of the church of Marseilles, a man learned in the Divine Scripture and refined by the most subtle exercise of its interpretation, schooled, also in the language, selected, at the urging of the holy bishop Venerius, readings from the Holy Writings appropriate to the feast days of the entire year and responsorial psalms (responsoria psalmorum capitula) appropriate to the season and to the readings.

He probably put together this lectionary about 450. Gennadius goes on to state that this work proved indispensable for lectors in church. He also addressed to Eustathius, the successor of Venerius, an "excellent and sizable Book of Sacraments, divided into various sections according to the offices and time, according to the text of the reading, sequence of the psalms, and chanting, but proper for praying to God and asking for the multitude of His favours." This sacramentary showed his understanding and eloquence. It is probable that this work "at least contained directions for the divine office rather than prayers for the mass". The work has not survived. Gennadius also states that it was said that he also delivered homilies.
