= Contemporary Christian music =

Genre of modern popular music

- Stylistic origins: Christian music; Church music; Gospel music; Jesus music; American popular music
- Cultural origins: Late 1960s, United States

Subgenres
- Christian alternative rock; Christian country music; Christian electronic dance music; Christian hip-hop; Christian metal; Christian rock; Christian punk; Contemporary worship music; Urban contemporary gospel; Latin Christian music

Other topics
- Christian media

Contemporary Christian music (CCM), also known as Christian pop, and occasionally inspirational music, is a genre of modern popular music, and an aspect of Christian media, which is lyrically focused on matters related to the Christian faith and stylistically rooted in Christian music. Originating in the United States, it was formed by those affected by the 1960s Jesus movement revival who began to express themselves in other styles of popular music, beyond the church music of hymns, gospel, traditional black gospel, and Southern gospel music that was prevalent in the church at the time. Initially referred to as "Jesus music", today, the term is typically used to refer to pop, but also includes Christian rock, southern rock, alternative rock, hip-hop, metal, contemporary worship, punk, hardcore punk, Latin, electronic dance music, R&B-influenced gospel, and country styles.

After its development in the United States, contemporary Christian music has since become a globally recognized style of faith-based popular music. It has representation on several music charts, including Billboard's Christian Albums, Christian Songs, Hot Christian AC (Adult Contemporary), Christian CHR, Soft AC/Inspirational, and Christian Digital Songs, as well as the UK's Official Christian & Gospel Albums Chart. Top-selling CCM artists will also appear on the Billboard 200. In the iTunes Store, the genre is represented as part of the Christian and gospel genre (Note: In the US iTunes store, the section is entitled Christian & Gospel. In the UK iTunes store, it's Gospel. Canada's and Australia's iTunes section is entitled Inspirational.) while the Google Play Music system labeled it as Christian/Gospel.

== History ==
=== Beginnings (1950s–1960s) ===
The growing popularity of rock and roll music in the 1950s and 1960s was initially dismissed among Protestant churches and denominations, as it was believed to encourage sinfulness. However, as Baptist, Evangelical and Pentecostal churches in the United States adapted to appeal to more people, the musical styles used in worship changed as well by adopting the sounds of this popular style.

The genre became known as "contemporary Christian music" as a result of the Jesus movement revival in response to the American counterculture during the latter 1960s and early 1970s, and was originally called "Jesus music". "About that time, many young people from the sixties' counterculture professed to believe in Jesus. Convinced of the "bareness" of a lifestyle based on drugs, free sex, and "radical politics", some of the Jesus 'hippies' became known as 'Jesus people'". It was during the 1970s that Christian music started to become an industry within itself, led by the Jesus movement. "Jesus music" started by playing instruments and singing songs about love and peace, which then translated into love of God. Paul Wohlegemuth, who wrote the book Rethinking Church Music, said "[the] 1970s will see a marked acceptance of rock-influenced music in all levels of church music. The rock style will become more familiar to all people, its rhythmic excesses will become refined, and its earlier secular associations will be less remembered."

Evangelical, Pentecostal, and Charismatic artists made significant contributions to CCM in the 1960s and 1970s, developing various Christian music styles, from Christian rock to Christian hip-hop, continuing on to Christian punk and Christian metal. Those involved were affected by the late 1960s to early 1970s Jesus movement, whose adherents colloquially called themselves "Jesus Freaks", as an Evangelical Christian response to the American counterculture movements, such as hippies and flower children, who were finding widespread traction. The Calvary Chapel was one such response, which launched Maranatha Music in 1971. They soon began to express themselves in alternative styles of popular music and worship music. The Dove Awards, an annual ceremony which rewards Christian music, was created in Memphis, Tennessee in October 1969 by the Gospel Music Association.

Larry Norman is often remembered as the "father of Christian rock", because of his early contributions (before the Jesus movement) to the developing new genre that mixed rock rhythms with the Christian messages. Though his style was not initially well received by some in the Christian community of the time, he continued throughout his career to create controversial hard-rock songs such as "Why Should the Devil Have All the Good Music?" He is remembered as the artist "who first combined rock 'n' roll with Christian lyrics" in the Gospel Music Hall of Fame. Notable Christian albums that contained contemporary-sounding songs in the 1960s were Upon This Rock (1969) by Larry Norman, initially released on Capitol Records, and Mylon – We Believe by Mylon LeFevre, released by Cotillion, which was LeFevre's attempt at blending gospel music with southern rock. Unlike traditional or southern gospel music, this new Jesus music was birthed out of rock and folk music.

Pioneers of this movement also included Andraé Crouch and the Disciples, the Imperials, Michael Omartian, 2nd Chapter of Acts, Phil Keaggy, Love Song, Barry McGuire, Evie, Paul Clark, Randy Matthews, Randy Stonehill, and Keith Green, among others. The small Jesus music culture had expanded into a multimillion-dollar industry by the 1980s. A number of CCM artists such as Benny Hester, Amy Grant, DC Talk, Michael W. Smith, Stryper, and Jars of Clay found crossover success with Top 40 mainstream radio play.

=== Popularity (1970s–1990s) ===
The genre emerged and became prevalent in the 1970s and 1980s. Beginning in July 1978, CCM Magazine began covering "contemporary Christian music" artists and a wide range of spiritual themes until it launched online publications in 2009.

Themes and messages include praise and worship, faith, encouragement, and prayer. Songs also focus on themes of devotion, inspiration, redemption, reconciliation, and renewal. A number of people listen to contemporary Christian music for comfort in tough times. The lyrics and messages conveyed in CCM songs have had varied, positive Christian messages over the decades. For instance, some songs have aimed at evangelism and some lyrics are meant to praise and worship Jesus. One of the earliest goals of CCM was to spread the gospel of Jesus to non-Christians. In addition, contemporary Christian music also strengthens the faith of Christians.

Various Evangelical record labels have supported the movement. In Christian rock, Sparrow Records was founded in 1976 in the United States by Billy Ray Hearn, a Christian music graduate from Baylor University. The songs of Hillsong Music, a record label founded in 1991 by the Hillsong Church in Sydney, Australia, have been translated into various languages and have had an influence considerable in other Evangelical churches worldwide.

In Christian hip-hop, TobyMac, Todd Collins, and Joey Elwood founded the first specialized label, Gotee Records, in 1994. In 2004, the founding of the label Reach Records by Lecrae and Ben Washer also had a significant impact in the development of Christian hip-hop.

Contemporary Christian musicians and listeners have sought to extend their music into settings where religious music traditionally might not be heard. For instance, MercyMe's song "I Can Only Imagine" was a crossover success in 1999 despite having a clear Christian message. In 2018, Lauren Daigle's 'You Say' was a similar hit. According to a 2009 study published by Faith Communities Today, 64 percent of churches that adopted contemporary Christian music in the past five years saw an increase in service attendance of 2 percent or more.

=== Modernity (2000s–2020s) ===
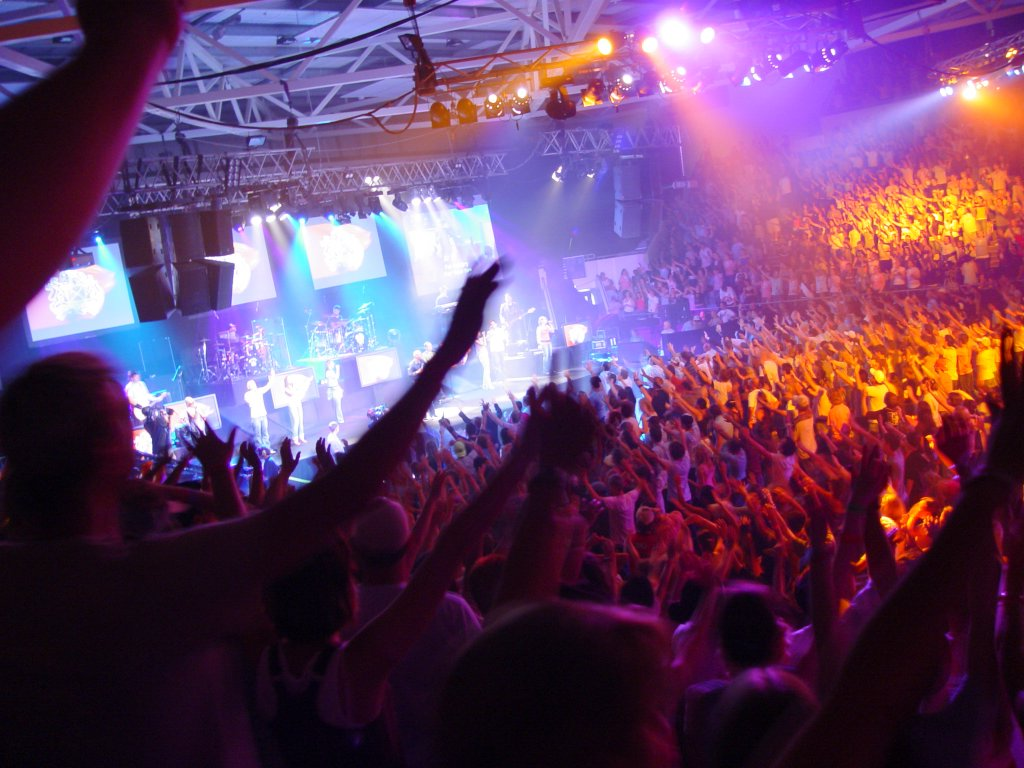
Contemporary Christian band Planetshakers performing at the Planetshakers Church in Melbourne, Australia (2005)

Contemporary Christian music has influences from folk, gospel, pop, and rock music. Genres of music such as soft rock, folk rock, alternative, hip-hop, etc. have played a large influence on CCM.

Evangelical, Pentecostal, and Charismatic denominations have had a large influence on contemporary Christian music and are among the largest producers of contemporary Christian music, which has also expanded into multiple subgenres. Christian punk, Christian hardcore, Christian metal, and Christian hip-hop, although not normally considered CCM, can also come under the genre's umbrella. Contemporary worship music is also incorporated into modern CCM, with songs and albums being both recorded and performed during Christian conferences, concert tours, camp meetings, revival meetings, and church services.

In the 2000s, contemporary worship music with a distinctly theological focus has emerged, primarily in the Baptist, Reformed, and non-denominational branches of Protestant Christianity. Artists include well-known groups such as Shane & Shane and modern hymn-writers, such as Keith & Kristyn Getty, as well as others like Sovereign Grace Music, Matt Boswell, and Aaron Keyes. The format is gaining traction in a number of churches and other areas in culture as well as being heard in CCM collections and musical algorithms on several Internet streaming services.

According to a 2023 study by Worship Leader Research, of the top 25 most popular song licenses used by churches between 2010 and 2020, nearly 100% came from three megachurch music groups; Hillsong Worship (Hillsong Church), Bethel Music (Bethel Church), and Elevation Worship (Elevation Church).

== Controversy ==
There was some internal critique of contemporary Christian music at its advent. The Christian college Bob Jones University discourages its dormitory students from listening to CCM.

Brian Schwertley of the Reformed Presbyterian Church wrote in 2001 that the inclusion of CCM in a worship service violates the second commandment and the regulative principle of worship because it adds man-made inventions, lyrics, and instrumental music to the biblically appointed way of worshipping God.

"The responsibility of the church is not to provide escape from reality", according to Donald Ellsworth, the author of Christian Music in Contemporary Witness, "but to give answers to contemporary problems through legitimate, biblical means".

According to Vice magazine, CCM "has often functioned as a propaganda wing of the Christian right", presenting views on topics such as the war on drugs, Christian nationalism, mission trips, school prayer, and the LGBT community.

=== Label rejection ===
Several high-profile bands have rejected the label "Christian music", such as Needtobreathe and Mutemath, with the latter suing their record label over being marketed as such. Of the categorization, Needtobreathe said to Rolling Stone: "Any label is limiting. That one in particular is especially limiting. To me, I think people pass over the band all the time because they read that....I hate the idea that they somehow feel like I didn't make the music for them, that we didn't play music for everyone. Christian record deals came and we said no to all of them. Waited a couple years until the right record deal came, which was Atlantic, which we've been on ever since. But we just said to them in passing when we first started, we want the records to be available to everyone."

== Growth and decline ==
Contemporary Christian album sales increased from $31 million in 1996 to $44 million in sales in 2000. After EMI's purchase of Sparrow Records in 1996, their sales increased 100 percent by 2002. Overall, CCM sales in 2014 dropped to $17 million.

== See also ==
- Altar call – Tradition in some Christian churches
- Christian alternative rock – Alternative rock music lyrically grounded in a Christian worldview
- Christian country music – Music genre, country music with Christian message
- Christian electronic dance music – Music genre
- Christian metal – Heavy metal music with a Christian message and band members
- Christian rock – Rock music with lyrics related to Jesus and Christianity
- Contemporary commercial music – Term referring to non-classical music
- Contemporary worship music – Modern genre of music sung in many churches
- Latin Christian music – Fusion of Latin music and various forms of modern Christian music
- Neues Geistliches Lied – Contemporary genre of German music intended for use in churches
- Revival meeting – Series of Christian religious services
- Tent revival – Gathering of Evangelical Christian worshipers
