= Aaron Keyes =

American Christian musician (born 1978)

- Born: Aaron Robert Keyes; September 8, 1978 (age 47); Greenville, South Carolina
- Origin: Snellville, Georgia
- Genres: Contemporary Christian music, Christian rock, worship
- Occupations: Singer, songwriter
- Instrument: Vocals
- Years active: 1998–present
- Label: Kingsway
- Website: aaronkeyes.com

Aaron Robert Keyes (born September 8, 1978) is an American Christian musician. He released Not Guilty Anymore through Kingsway Records in 2007. His subsequent album, Dwell, was released by Kingsway Records in 2011. This album was his breakthrough release on the Billboard magazine Christian Albums chart.

== Early life ==
Keyes was born on September 8, 1978, as Aaron Robert Keyes, in Greenville, South Carolina, at Bob Jones Hospital. His father is a preacher.

== Music career ==
He started his music career in 1998 and released his first album, Because, in March 2004. His subsequent album, Not Guilty Anymore, was released on August 24, 2010 by Kingsway Records. This album was reviewed by Christianity Today, Cross Rhythms, Jesus Freak Hideout, and Louder Than the Music. He released Dwell with Kingsway Communications on June 21, 2011. The album was his breakthrough release on the Billboard magazine charts, where it peaked at No. 43 on the Christian Albums chart. This album was reviewed by AllMusic, Christianity Today, Cross Rhythms, Jesus Freak Hideout, and Louder Than the Music.

== Discography ==
Studio albums

List of studio albums, with selected chart positions
Title	Album details	Peak chart positions
Title	Album details	US Christ
Because	Released: March 11, 2004; Label: Inpop; CD, digital download	–
Not Guilty Anymore	Released: August 24, 2010; Label: Kingsway; CD, digital download	–
Dwell	Released: June 21, 2011; Label: Kingsway; CD, digital download	43
In The Living Room	Released: June 13, 2013; Label: Integrity; CD, digital download	–
