= A Simple Way to Pray =

A Simple Way to Pray for Master Peter the Barber (German: Eine einfältige weise zu beten für ein guten freund, 1535) is a short book by Protestant reformer Martin Luther.

Luther gives the Our Father, Ten Commandments and Apostolic Creed, which are the main content of his Small Catechism, showing by example, how they can be meditated and contemplated. This is done in a manner of four stranded chaplet. The four strands consist of:

- Instruction
- Thanksgiving
- Confession of sins
- Prayer petitions

== Original German text ==
- WA 38:359-375
