= Covenant renewal worship =

Type of Christian order of worship

Covenant renewal worship is an approach to Christian worship practiced in some Reformed churches, in which the order of worship is modeled on the structure of biblical covenants and sacrifices. One popular order is as follows:

1. Call to Worship
2. Confession of sin
3. Consecration, which includes Bible readings and the sermon
4. Communion, or the Lord's Supper
5. Commissioning, or Benediction

Churches which worship in this way consider that Sunday is the covenant day (Lord's Day) in which the covenant people (the church) meet with God to hear his covenant word (the Bible) and celebrate the covenant meal (Communion, or the Lord's Supper). This order of worship is perceived to be present in Old Testament rituals. Jeffrey Meyers sees this fivefold structure in passages such Leviticus 1:1–9, and the entire Book of Deuteronomy. He also views three Levitical sacrifices – the purification offering, the ascension offering, and the fellowship offering – as corresponding to steps 2 to 4.

The first person to publish material on covenant renewal worship was James B. Jordan, who began writing on the topic in the early 1990s. In 2003, Jeffrey Meyers published The Lord's Service: The Grace of Covenant Renewal Worship, and the Reformed Presbyterian Church of North America adopted a position paper calling for covenant renewal worship. Covenant renewal worship is common in the Communion of Reformed Evangelical Churches. A number of congregations in the Presbyterian Church in America also practice it.

== See also ==
- Covenant theology
- Reformed worship
