= Lectio continua =

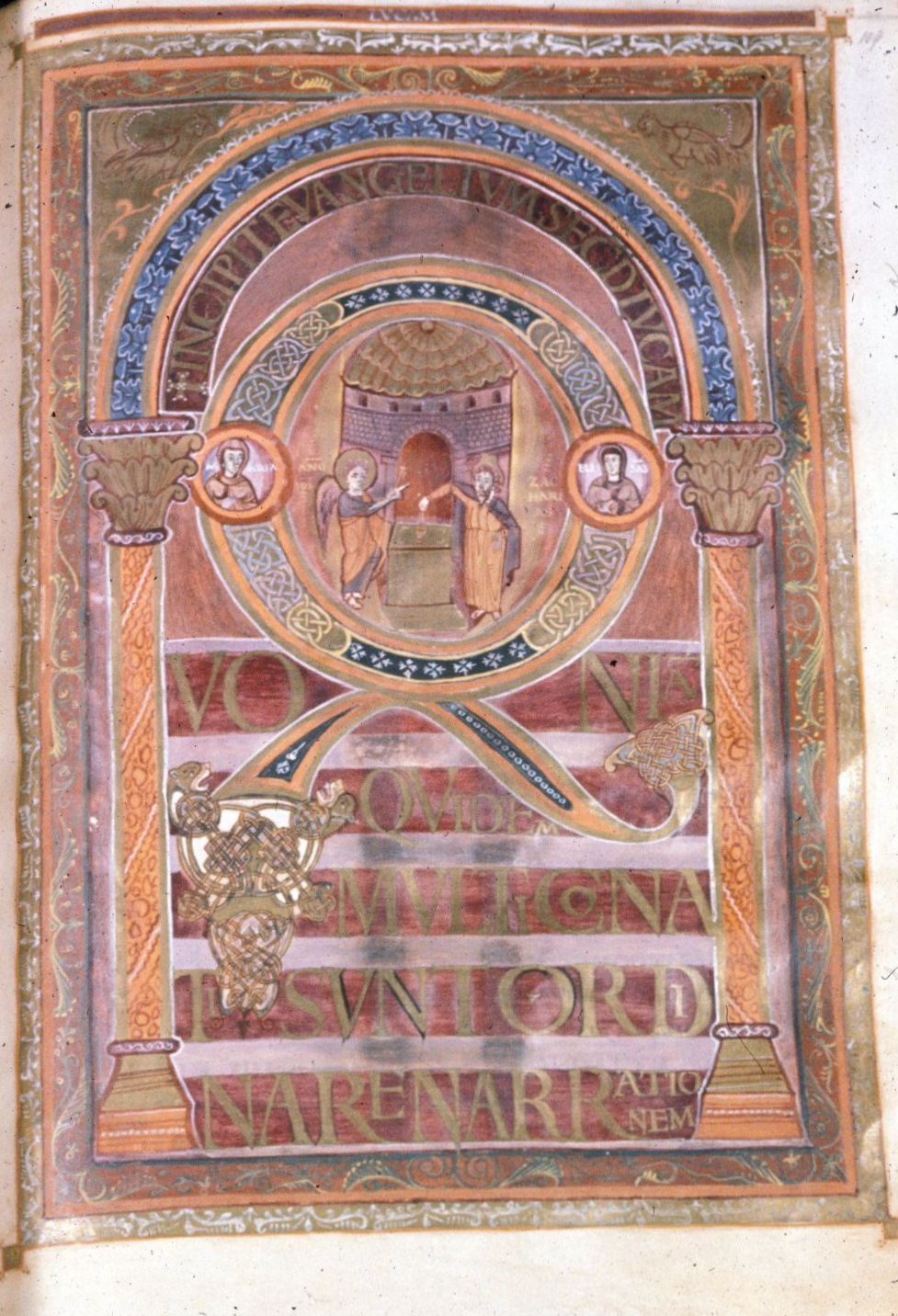
A Harley Golden Gospels, Incipit to Luke, c. 800

In Christianity, Lectio continua (Latin for continuous reading) refers to the practice of reading Scripture in sequence over a period of time. Each reading (which may take place every day or every Sunday) etc. begins where the previous session ended. For instance, every Sunday a section of the Bible can be read such that each reading resumes where the previous one ended.

The practice of lectio semi-continua may skip some passages in the sequence, while lectio selecta follows a selected sequence of passages in a specific order.

The use of lectio selecta goes back to the Jewish traditions that pre-date Christianity. Luke 4:16–21 refers to the practice reading from the book of the prophet Isaiah on the Sabbath when Jesus visits a synagogue.

In Early Christianity a practice developed to read the Scripture every Sunday or read specific sections of Scripture during festivals in a yearly sequence, and the sequences used for lectio continua and lectio selecta were established over the centuries.

The term lectio divina is distinct from this practice and refers to stages of Christian meditation contemplative prayer based on the reading of the Bible. However, lectio divina does not need to follow a sequence in the book, and focuses mostly on the meditative aspects.

== See also ==
- Lectio Sacra
