= Delirious? discography =

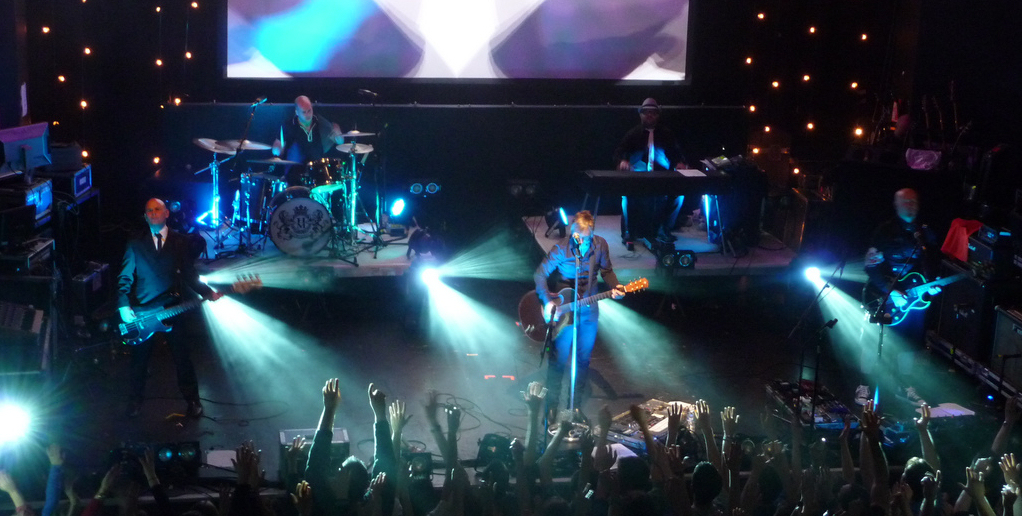
- Studio albums: 9
- Live albums: 6
- Compilation albums: 3
- Singles: 22
- Music videos: 13

The following article describes in detail the discography of Delirious?, including all of their studio albums, live albums, compilation albums, singles, and other various releases.

== Albums ==
=== Studio albums ===
Title	Details	Peak chart positions				Certifications
Title	Details	UK	SCO	US	US Christ	Certifications
Cutting Edge	Released: December 1995 (UK), 1 January 1998 (US); Label: Furious? Records; Formats: CD, cassette	—	—	—	18	RIAA: Gold; MC: Gold
King of Fools	Released: 16 June 1997 (UK), 19 May 1998 (US); Label: Furious?, Sparrow Records; Formats: CD	13	—	— (Note: King of Fools did not enter the Billboard 200, but peaked at No. 13 on the Top Heatseekers)	7	BPI: Silver
Mezzamorphis	Released: 12 April 1999 (UK), 8 June 1999 (US); Label: Furious?, Sparrow; Formats: CD	25	53	137	2	
Glo	Released: 29 July 2000 (UK), 10 October 2000 (US); Label: Furious?, Sparrow; Formats: CD	—	—	177	13	
Audio Lessonover?	Released: 6 August 2001 (UK); Label: Furious?; Formats: CD	58	96	—	—	
Touch	Released: 2 November 2002 (UK), 19 November 2002 (US); Label: Furious?, Sparrow; Formats: CD	—	—	— (Note: Touch did not enter the Billboard 200, but peaked at No. 34 on the Top Heatseekers)	31	
World Service	Released: 15 December 2003 (UK), 10 February 2004 (US); Label: Furious?, Sparrow; Formats: CD	—	—	— (Note: World Service did not enter the Billboard 200, but peaked at No. 26 on the Top Heatseekers)	20	
The Mission Bell	Released: 7 November 2005 (UK), 27 November 2005 (US); Label: Furious?, Sparrow; Formats: CD, LP, DD, streaming	—	—	—	29	
Kingdom of Comfort	Released: 31 March 2008 (UK), 1 April 2008 (US); Label: Furious?, Sparrow; Formats: CD	—	—	—	24	
"—" denotes a recording that did not chart or was not released in that territory.

=== Live albums ===
Title	Details	Peak chart positions
Title	Details	US Christ
Live & In the Can	Released: 1 December 1996 (UK), 3 November 1998 (US); Label: Furious? Records, Sparrow Records; Formats: CD	—
d:tour 1996 Live at Southamption	Released: 1 April 1998 (UK); Label: Furious?; Formats: CD	—
Access:d	Released: 30 November 2002 (UK), 8 April 2003 (US); Label: Furious?, Sparrow; Formats: CD	—
UP: Unified Praise (with Hillsong United)	Released: 1 November 2004 (UK), 18 January 2005 (US); Label: Furious?, Sparrow; Formats: CD	24
Now is the Time	Released: 9 October 2006 (UK), 17 October 2006 (US); Label: Furious?; Formats: CD	45
My Soul Sings	Released: 16 March 2009 (UK); Label: Furious?; Formats: CD	42
Farewell Show	Released: 119 April 2010 (UK); Label: Furious?; Formats: CD	—
"—" denotes a recording that did not chart or was not released in that territory.

=== Compilation albums ===
Title	Details	Peak chart positions	
Title	Details	US	US Christ
Deeper	Released: 9 October 2001 (US), 7 January 2002 (UK); Label: Furious? Records, Sparrow Records; Formats: CD	— (Note: Deeper did not enter the Billboard 200, but peaked at No. 31 on the Top Heatseekers)	27
Libertad	Released: 16 November 2002 (UK), 5 May 2003 (US); Label: Furious?, Sparrow; Formats: CD	—	—
History Makers	Released: 6 November 2009 (UK); Label: Furious?, Sparrow; Formats: CD	—	—
"—" denotes a recording that did not chart or was not released in that territory.

== Singles ==
Title	Year	Peak chart positions							Album
Title	Year	UK	UK Indie	GER	GER (SWR)	US Christ AC	US Christ CHR	US Christ Rock	Album
"White Ribbon Day"	1997	41	—	—	—	—	—	—	King of Fools
"Deeper"	1997	20	3	—	—	8	1	21	King of Fools
"Promise"	1997	20	—	—	—	—	—	—	King of Fools
"See the Star"	1999	16	5	—	—	—	7	—	Mezzamorphis
"It's OK"	2000	18	3	—	—	—	—	—	Mezzamorphis
"Waiting for the Summer"	2001	26	—	—	—	—	—	—	Audio Lessonover?
"I Could Sing of Your Love Forever"	2001	40	—	—	—	—	—	—	Deeper
"Inside Outside"	2003	—	—	72	1	—	—	—	World Service
"Every Little Thing"	2003	—	—	—	2	—	—	—	World Service
"Rain Down"	2005	—	—	—	2	—	—	—	World Service
"Paint the Town Red"	2005	56	—	—	—	—	—	—	The Mission Bell
"Love Will Find a Way"	2008	44	—	—	—	—	—	—	Kingdom of Comfort
"History Maker"	2010	4	1	—	—	—	—	—	History Makers
"—" denotes a recording that did not chart or was not released in that territory.

== Music videos ==
Year	Title	Director(s)	Album	Source
1997	"Deeper"		King of Fools	Watch
1997	"Promise"		King of Fools	Watch
1997	"Sanctify" (Live version)		King of Fools	Watch
1999	"Pursuit of Happiness"		It's OK single	Watch
1999	"See the Star"		Mezzamorphis	Watch
1999	"Gravity"		Mezzamorphis	Watch
2000	"It's OK"		Mezzamorphis	Watch
2000	"Everything"	Andy Hutch	Glo	Watch
2001	"Waiting for the Summer"	Andy Hutch	Audio Lessonover?	Watch
2001	"Take Me Away"		Audio Lessonover?	Watch
2001	"I Could Sing of Your Love Forever"		Deeper	Watch
2004	"Inside Outside"		World Service	Watch
2008	"Love Will Find a Way"		Kingdom of Comfort	Watch
