= D tour 1997 Live at Southampton =

d:tour

Live album by Delirious?
- Released: 1 April 1998
- Recorded: Southampton, England, UK
- Genre: Christian Rock
- Label: Furious?
- Producer: Andy Piercy

Delirious? chronology
King of Fools (1997)	d:tour (1998)	Mezzamorphis (1999)

d:tour 1997 Live at Southampton, or simply d:tour, is a live album by the English band Delirious?.

== History ==
The album was released in 1998 and was the second live offering from Delirious? after Live & In the Can, which was released a few years prior. It was recorded on a leg of the band's legendary first full UK tour, at the Southampton Guildhall venue. Originally d:tour 1997 Live @ Southampton on first publication, the title was later shortened to d:tour 1997 Live on reprints. It is now known simply as d:tour in fan circles. As with Live and in the Can, special packaging was produced for the album, this time in the form of a cardboard slip case with internal artwork.

The tour featured the songs of the band's first full studio album, King of Fools, several of which are featured here. Other songs on the album include "Come Like You Promise", which was originally found on a long out of print solo album by guitarist Stu G, Have You Heard? It also appeared on Live & In the Can, was later rerecorded as a b-side for the single "It's OK", and now appears on the compilation album Deeper. "Summer of Love" also appears, having only previously been released as a b-side on the DeEPer EP.

== Reception ==
Professional ratings
Review scores
Source	Rating
The Phantom Tollbooth	4/5 stars
Cross Rhythms	10/10 stars

It was released to critical acclaim, "The Phantom Tollbooth", gave the album four out of five stars. Cross Rhythms gave the album a 10/10 grade in a review by renowned Christian music journalist and radio producer Mike Rimmer who said, "This little beaut of an album is a stark, raw, powerful snatch of the heady atmosphere."

== Current status ==
In the modern day, whilst still revered by many fans, d:tour is now difficult to find, after having been out of print for several years. Delirious? have since removed all traces of its existence from its official website, not mentioning it in the discography and not supplying it to sellers. However, it is still mentioned in the slip notes for their 2002 compilation album Deeper. Live footage of the gig is available on the DVD release Archive:D, which contains the video version of the gig, previously released on VHS as A View From The Terraces. The album is now only purchasable from specialist sellers and on public auction websites such as eBay and Amazon Marketplace.

== Track listing ==
1. "Game Over?"
2. "Sanctify" – (Martin Smith)
3. "Come Like You Promise" – (Stuart Garrard)
4. "Promise" – (Smith)
5. "Summer of Love" – (Smith/Garrard)
6. "Hands of Kindness" – (Smith)
7. "King or Cripple" – (Smith)
8. "I'm Not Ashamed" – (Smith)
9. "King of Fools" – (Smith)
10. "Obsession" – (Smith)
11. "History Maker" – (Smith)
12. "All the Way" – (Smith)
13. "Deeper" – (Smith)

== Personnel ==
- Martin Smith – vocals, guitar
- Stuart "Stu G" Garrard – lead guitar, backing vocals
- Stewart Smith – drums, percussion, backing vocals
- Jon Thatcher – bass, keyboard, upright bass, theremin
- Tim Jupp – piano, keyboards
