= My Soul Sings =

Live album by Delirious?
- Released: 16 March 2009
- Recorded: September 2008
- Genre: Rock, Christian rock
- Length: 71:48
- Label: Sparrow, Furious?
- Producer: Delirious?

Delirious? chronology
Kingdom of Comfort (2008)	My Soul Sings (2009)	History Makers (2009)

My Soul Sings is a live album by the band Delirious?. The album was released on 16 March 2009. It was the band's last new recording before their farewell tour at the end of 2009. It takes its name from the song, My Soul Sings, which was included on Kingdom of Comfort. Generación 12, a Colombian worship band sang part of some songs in Spanish. A special Colombian Edition has been released in South America, to cater for the Colombian market, where Delirious? has a large following.

== International track listing ==
=== CD ===
1. "Rain Down" (Martin Smith, Stu Garrard) – with Generación 12
2. "God Is Smiling" (Smith, Garrard, Jon Thatcher)
3. "God's Romance" (Smith)
4. "Hallelujah" (Smith, Garrard, Thatcher)
5. "Bliss" (Smith, Garrard)
6. "Love Will Find a Way" (Smith, Garrard, Thatcher)
7. "All God's Children" (Smith, Garrard, Thatcher)
8. "History Maker" (Smith)
9. "Break the Silence" (Smith, Garrard, Thatcher, Iain Archer)
10. "Deeper" (Smith, Garrard)
11. "Majesty" (Garrard, Smith) – with Generación 12
12. "Kingdom of Comfort" (Smith, Garrard, Thatcher)
13. "Stare the Monster Down" (Smith, Garrard, Thatcher)
14. "My Soul Sings" (Smith, Garrard, Thatcher) – with Generación 12

=== DVD ===
1. "Rain Down" (Smith, Garrard) – with Generación 12
2. "God Is Smiling" (Smith, Garrard, Thatcher)
3. "Bliss" (Smith, Garrard)
4. "Love Will Find a Way" (Smith, Garrard, Thatcher)
5. "All God's Children" (Smith, Garrard, Thatcher)
6. "How Sweet the Name" (Smith, Garrard, Thatcher)
7. "History Maker" (Smith)
8. "Break the Silence" (Smith, Garrard, Thatcher, Archer)
9. "Deeper" (Smith, Garrard)
10. "Majesty" (Garrard, Smith) – with Generación 12
11. "Paint the Town Red" (Smith, Garrard, Thatcher, Stewart Smith, Tim Jupp)
12. "Kingdom of Comfort" (Smith, Garrard, Thatcher)
13. "Stare the Monster Down" (Smith, Garrard, Thatcher)
14. "My Soul Sings" (Smith, Garrard, Thatcher) – with Generación 12

== Special Colombian edition track listing ==
=== CD & DVD ===
1. "Rain Down" (Smith, Garrard) – with Generación 12
2. "God Is Smiling" (Smith, Garrard, Thatcher)
3. "Bliss" (Smith, Garrard)
4. "Love Will Find a Way" (Smith, Garrard, Thatcher)
5. "All God's Children" (Smith, Garrard, Thatcher)
6. "How Sweet the Name" (Smith, Garrard, Thatcher)
7. "History Maker" (Smith)
8. "Break the Silence" (Smith, Garrard, Thatcher, Archer)
9. "Deeper" (Smith, Garrard)
10. "Majesty" (Garrard, Smith) – with Generación 12
11. "Paint the Town Red" (Smith, Garrard, Thatcher, Smith, Jupp)
12. "Kingdom of Comfort" (Smith, Garrard, Thatcher)
13. "Stare the Monster Down" (Smith, Garrard, Thatcher)
14. "My Soul Sings" (Smith, Garrard, Thatcher) – with Generación 12

== Reception ==
Professional ratings
Review scores
Source	Rating
CCM Magazine	4/5 stars
Cross Rhythms	8/10 stars
Jesus Freak Hideout	(CD) (DVD)
LouderThanTheMusic.com	4/5 stars

CCM Magazine stated that this CD "powerfully commemorate all that we have come to love about this band" and that it will enter "into the annals of Christian music history". Dave Wood, reviewer from Louder than the Music website emphasizes the visual aspect: "Superb camera shots flow perfectly with a great mix of close ups and long shots...". It describes the DVD as a "worthy representation of the exquisite live Delirious? experience". Cross Rhythms gives the album an 8 out of 10 note. However it points that "it's hard not to feel a tinge of disappointment" as the album is not "sonically pleasing and well-rounded as some of their output in the past". Jesus Freak Hideout reviewer Kevin Chamberlin has also mixed feelings. Although it praises the lighting as "spectacular", the video editing is "somewhat choppy and slightly cheesy" with "pretty standard" camera angles and close-ups. However, he says that overall it is "an intriguing, engrossing experience".

== Charts ==
Weekly chart performance for My Soul Sings: Live From Bogota, Colombia
Chart (2009)	Peak position
US Christian Albums (Billboard)	42
