= Waiting for the Summer =

Single by Delirious?

from the album Audio Lessonover? & Touch
- Released: 2001
- Recorded: 2001
- Genre: Rock
- Length: 3:25 (Album Version)
- Label: Furious? Records
- Songwriters: Stuart Garrard; Martin Smith
- Producer: Chuck Zwicky

Delirious? singles chronology
"It's OK" (2000)	"Waiting for the Summer" (2001)	"I Could Sing of Your Love Forever" (2001)

"Waiting for the Summer" is a song written and recorded by UK outfit Delirious?. The song was the first radio single released in support of the band's 2001 studio album, Audio Lessonover?. The song also appears on the United States version of the album, entitled Touch, but is a different version than its UK counterpart. The single peaked at #26 on the UK Singles Chart.

== Track listing ==
CD1

1. "Waiting for the Summer" (Radio Edit)
2. "Show Me Heaven"
3. "Waiting for the Summer" (Stu Garage Re:mix)

CD2

1. "Waiting for the Summer" (Album Version)
2. "Waiting for the Summer" (The dba Mix)
3. "Waiting for the Summer" CD-ROM Music Video

== Charts ==
Weekly chart performance for "Waiting for the Summer"
Chart (2001)	Peak position
UK Singles (OCC)	26
