= Touch (Delirious? album) =

Studio album by Delirious?
- Released: 19 November 2002
- Genres: Rock, Christian Rock
- Length: 42:42
- Label: Furious?
- Producer: Chuck Zwicky

Delirious? chronology
Libertad (2001)	Touch (2002)	Access:D (2002)

Touch is an album released by Delirious? in 2002. It is essentially a clone of album Audio Lessonover? released in North America. In fact, only the first song, "Touch", is new. "Love is the Compass" and "Waiting for the Summer" are different versions from the UK release, and four songs present on Audio Lessonover were removed from Touch.

The cover for the album featured a black thermosensitive plate which would reveal a photograph of the band when it became warm (ideally, from the "touch" of a human hand).

Two versions of this album exist, a limited edition two-disc set and an 'international version' only containing disc one.

== Track listing ==
=== CD ===
1. "Touch" (Martin Smith, Stuart Garrard) – 4:58
2. "Love is the Compass" (Smith, Garrard) – 3:29
3. "Fire" (Smith, Garrard) – 3:34
4. "Alien" (Smith, Garrard) – 4:19
5. "Angel in Disguise" (Garrard, Smith) – 4:29
6. "Rollercoaster" (Smith, Garrard) – 3:46
7. "Show Me Heaven" (Smith, Garrard) – 3:24
8. "Take Me Away" (Smith, Garrard) – 3:22
9. "Waiting for the Summer" (Smith, Garrard) – 3:24
10. "Stealing Time" (Smith, Garrard) – 7:52

=== Bonus Disc (Live) ===
1. "Deeper"
2. "My Glorious"
3. "Did You Feel the Mountains Tremble"
4. "What a Friend I've Found"
5. "I Could Sing of Your Love Forever"
6. "There Is a Light"

==== CD-Rom Videos ====
- "Take Me Away"
- "Sanctify (Live @ Wembley)"
- "I Could Sing of Your Love Forever"

== Reception ==
Professional ratings
Review scores
Source	Rating
Delirious.org.uk	1/1 star
Jesus Freak Hideout	4/5 stars
The Phantom Tollbooth	3.5/5 stars

That Touch is a virtual copy of Audio Lessonover deeply influenced how the album has been perceived.

John DiBiase reviewing for Jesus Freak Hideout stated that "Touch is a good project as a whole", however, he said that he has a "feeling that most of these tracks are already over a year old and were originally created for a previous project." He goes further saying that, even though "Touch is still a pretty solid effort", fans are advised to "seek out a copy of Audio Lessonover."

The Phantom Tollbooth website contains three reviews for this album. They probably express better the kind of ambiguity towards it, going from "consistently good" and "must-have for anyone's collection", to "U2 clone" with "its moments of mimicry" and "not the Delirious? that I fell in love with".

Fan based website Delirious.org.uk review is more positive, saying that even though it misses four songs from Audio Lessonover, it still "remains a strong album with moments of reflection, passion and unquestionable faith."

== Charts ==
Chart performance for Touch
Chart (2002)	Peak position
US Top Christian Albums (Billboard)	31
US Heatseekers Albums (Billboard)	34
