= See the Star =

Single by Delirious?

from the album Mezzamorphis
- Released: 1999
- Recorded: 1999
- Genre: Rock, Christian rock
- Length: 3:31 (Album Version)
- Label: Furious? Records
- Songwriters: Martin Smith; Stuart Garrard
- Producer: Delirious?

Delirious? singles chronology
"deEPer" (1997)	"See the Star" (1999)	"It's OK" (2000)

"See the Star" is the first UK single and second US radio single from Delirious?'s second album, Mezzamorphis. It reached #16 in the UK Singles Charts making it the band's highest-charting single, until their final single release "History Maker" which entered the UK Singles chart at #4 in 2010.

== Track listing ==
CD1

1. "See the Star"
2. "Follow"
3. "See the Star" (d:llatrix Dub)

CD2

1. "See the Star"
2. "Obsession" (Odsession Mix)
3. "See the Star" CD-ROM Video

== Charts ==
Weekly chart performance for "See the Star"
Chart (1999)	Peak position
UK Singles (Official Charts)	16
UK Indie (Official Charts)	5
US Christian CHR (CCM)	7
