= Kingdom of Comfort =

Studio album by Delirious?
- Released: 1 April 2008
- Recorded: 2007
- Studio: Chapel Lane Studios (Hereford, UK); Street Studios (Rustington, UK).
- Genre: Alternative rock, Christian rock
- Length: 59:23
- Label: Sparrow/Furious?
- Producer: Delirious?, Sam Gibson

Delirious? chronology
Now Is The Time (2006)	Kingdom of Comfort (2008)	My Soul Sings (2009)

Kingdom of Comfort is the seventh and final studio album by the British Christian rock band Delirious?, released in the United States on 1 April 2008 and in the United Kingdom on 14 April 2008.

== History ==
Inspired by visits to India with Joyce Meyer Ministries, Delirious? decided to place the focus of the album on inequality and justice around the world. Guitarist Stu G. said,

Seeing children looking for scraps on the rubbish dump they call homes in Cambodia and the education and feeding projects in the slums of Mumbai India really had an impact on us. It wasn't possible to simply proceed with business as usual. We had to ask ourselves, 'What am I building? A kingdom of comfort? Or a kingdom of heaven?'

He also stated later that the title of the album was inspired from a sermon by Rob Bell, author and pastor of Mars Hill Bible Church.

When the band returned to the studio, they began the process of writing and recording the record. An improvised section, often played during the band's song "History Maker", was adapted to form "God Is Smiling". "Wonder" was written by Martin Smith about a child whom his family came close to adopting. "We Give You Praise" was written in collaboration with Hillsong worship leader Marty Sampson. "Break the Silence" was also written with ex-Snow Patrol musician Iain Archer. Fifteen songs were recorded in total, and twelve were selected for the final album. The band released the second track, "God Is Smiling", as an MP3 download from their official website on 1 November 2007; it had been downloaded over 10,000 times by January 2008. Another free download from the album, "We Give You Praise", was released on 1 February 2008. Upon the release of the album, two more tracks were also made available for free download from the band's official website—"Hallelujah" and "Mothers of the Night". One song, "Fill My Cup", has not been released by Delirious?, but appears on the Compassionart album and features vocals by Delirious? lead vocalist Martin Smith.

== Reception ==
Professional ratings
Review scores
Source	Rating
AllMusic	4.5/5 stars
The Album Project	3/5 stars
Christian Music Today	4.5/5 stars
Jesus Freak Hideout	4.5/5 stars
Cross Rhythms	10/10 stars
Patrol Magazine	(6.9/10)

Christian magazine Christian Today stated that the album "questions everything, from cancer to consumerism, 'five star' dreams to slums and poverty. It is an album that calls for sacrifice, social justice and love." It has also stated that "Kingdom of Comfort is yet another homerun (sic) for Delirious, with amped up modern rock production, some challenging lyrics meant to inspired by social action, and more stirring songs of worship." Cross Rhythms gave the album ten out of ten, stating that it was "one of the most raw, passionate albums that these Christian rock titans have ever released".

== Track listing ==
1. "Kingdom of Comfort" (Martin Smith, Stuart Garrard, Jon Thatcher) – 3:29
2. "God Is Smiling" (Smith, Garrard, Thatcher) – 4:09
3. "Give What You've Got" (Smith, Garrard, Thatcher) – 3:32
4. "Love Will Find a Way" (Smith, Garrard, Thatcher) – 4:29
5. "Eagle Rider" (Smith, Garrard, Thatcher) – 4:11
6. "We Give You Praise" (Smith, Garrard, Thatcher, Marty Sampson) – 5:13
7. "How Sweet the Name" (Smith, Garrard, Thatcher) – 5:42
8. "Wonder" (Smith, Garrard, Thatcher) – 4:13
9. "Break the Silence" (Smith, Garrard, Thatcher, Iain Archer) – 4:12
10. "Stare the Monster Down" (Smith, Garrard, Thatcher) – 3:27
11. "All God's Children" (Smith, Garrard, Thatcher) – 5:51
12. "My Soul Sings" (Smith, Garrard, Thatcher) – 6:59
13. "We Give You Praise (Radio Mix)" (Smith, Garrard, Thatcher, Marty Sampson) – 4:03 (US version only)
14. "Hallelujah" (Smith, Garrard, Thatcher) – 4:39 (download only)
15. "Mothers of the Night" (Smith, Garrard, Thatcher) – 5:28 (download only)

== Personnel ==
Delirious?

- Martin Smith – lead vocals, guitars, additional keyboards
- Stuart "Stu G" Garrard – guitars, programming, additional keyboards, vocals
- Tim Jupp – acoustic piano, keyboards
- Jon Thatcher – programming, additional keyboards, bass guitar, bass synth, theremin
- Stewart Smith – drums, percussion

Additional musicians

- Sam Gibson – drum programming, additional percussion, loops
- Gerard Le Feuvre – cello (7)
- Sir John Cass's Foundation Primary School Choir – choir (11)
- Pat Bilborough – choir director (11)

== Production ==
- Martin Smith – producer
- Stu G – producer
- Sam Gibson – producer, recording, mixing
- Christopher Stevens – producer (13), mixing (13)
- Andy Harsant – vocal recording (13)
- Leon Zervos – mastering at Sterling Sound (New York City, New York, USA)
- Les Moir – A&R assistance
- Lynn Nichols – A&R assistance
- Adrian Thompson – A&R assistance
- Chris York – A&R assistance
- Mark Debnam – creative director, design
- Stewart Smith – creative director, design
- David Dobson – photography
- Andy Hutch – photography
- Sonja Wrethman – photography
- Debbo & Smee – photography

== Charts ==
Chart performance for Kingdom of Comfort
Chart (2008)	Peak position
US Christian Albums (Billboard)	24
