= Daniel Hagen (musician) =

Australian musician

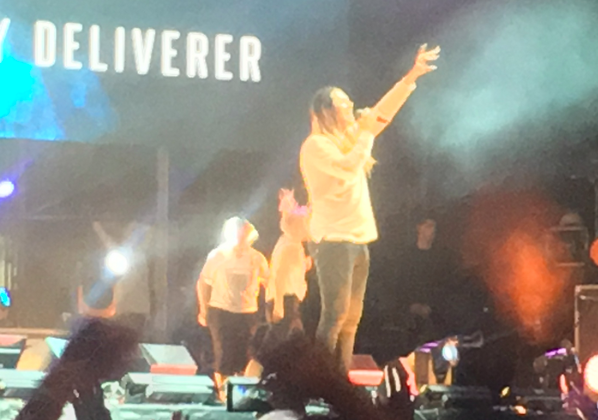
- Daniel Hagen on stage at Awakening Australia 2018, Marvel Stadium, Melbourne

Background information
- Born: Berwick, Victoria
- Origin: Melbourne, Australia
- Genres: Rock, Christian rock, gospel
- Occupations: Singer, musician, songwriter
- Instruments: Vocals, guitar
- Years active: 2001–present
- Labels: Awakening Music, Resound Sounds
- Website: http://www.danielhagen.com.au

Daniel Hagen is an Australian musician.

In the early 2000s, he was a singer-songwriter with the Australian group, The Hollow. His extended play, Ready or Not was released in 2016, and his album God My Deliverer was released in November 2018. He is the lead singer of the Awakening Band, leading worship at Awakening Europe and Awakening Australia events. He is the associate director of Awakening Australia. As at 2017, Daniel Hagen resided in Victoria, Australia.

== Early life and career ==
Daniel Hagen was born in Berwick, on the outskirts of Melbourne, Australia, to Tony and Irene Hagen. As a child, he learned to play the piano. He became a singer-songwriter with the Australian group, The Hollow in the early 2000s, recording with the Australian label Secret Sounds. During this time, he began performing with guitarist Glen Travica, with whom Hagen would later collaborate on albums launched by the Resound Sounds label. After Hagen became a born-again Christian, his songs began to take on themes reflecting his faith. Although at the time, The Hollow had been signed up to a six-figure recording deal, he was told by one of the recording label's managers that, "[T]his industry is full of drug dealers and pimps," and, "...you need to stop talking about Jesus and stop singing about Jesus if you want any more money invested into the band."

== Later career ==
After this, Hagen left The Hollow, and began songwriting and performing worship music in churches and Christian events in Australia and other countries.

In 2016, Hagen again teamed up with Glen Travica to record his debut solo extended play, Ready or Not, released by Travica's Resound Sounds label. It was released on iTunes on 22 September 2016 featuring four songs: "I Wanna Be Ready", "First Love Fire", "The Great I Am", and "Heavenly Places". Travica was also one of the guitarists on the album, which was recorded at Rangemaster Studios in Melbourne during July and August 2016

Daniel Hagen also appears as a vocalist and songwriter on the album Seek Your Face by the Resound Collective, on the song "Day of Salvation". The song was written by Hagen and his mother, Irene. Within a few days of release, both Ready or Not and Seek Your Face reached numbers 1 and 2 respectively on the iTunes Store Australia charts for the Inspirational genre.

On 28 October 2016, Hagen appeared with the Resound Band, at the Awakening Europe event, televised by GOD TV across Scandinavia, at Friends Arena, Stockholm, alongside UK artist and former Delirious? frontman Martin Smith. He performed with the Awakening Band at the Margaret Court Arena in March 2017, performing his song, "The Jesus Hymn". "The Jesus Hymn" single, recorded live at the Margaret Court Arena, was released on the iTunes Australia store on 4 August 2017. He appeared onstage at Tipsport Arena, Prague, at the Awakening Europe event, in June and July 2017, in an event broadcast by GOD TV. On 17 December that year, he released the EP album of Christmas music, Christmas Hill.

In September 2018, Hagen performed onstage with Awakening Music at the Awakening Europe Baltija event, held at Arēna Rīga in Riga, Latvia. Shortly after returning from Latvia, Hagen and Awakening Music released their album, God My Deliverer, featuring nine songs, on 17 November 2018.

Daniel Hagen and Awakening Band appeared onstage at the Europe Arise event at the Jaarbeurs exhibition centre in Utrecht, the Netherlands, in April 2019, and were onstage leading worship at the Awakening Europe Austria event at the Wiener Stadthalle in Vienna on 13–16 June 2019.

== Select Discography ==
- Ready Or Not, EP. (Resound Sounds, 2016)
  - 1. I Wanna Be Ready
  - 2. First Love Fire
  - 3. The Great I Am
  - 4. Heavenly Places
- The Jesus Hymn (Live at Margaret Court Arena), Single. (Daniel Hagen & The Awakening Band, 2017)
- Christmas Hill, EP. (Awakening Music, 2017)
  - 1. Joy to the World
  - 2. O Holy Night
  - 3. Little Drummer Boy
  - 4. O Come All Ye Faithful
- God My Deliverer, Album. (Awakening Music, 2017)
  - 1. Champion
  - 2. God My Deliverer
  - 3. Not Alone
  - 4. Where You Are
  - 5. You Are All
  - 6. The Jesus Hymn
  - 7. Awake
  - 8. Bring You Home
  - 9. Overflow
