= Now Is the Time (Delirious? album) =

Live album by Delirious?
- Released: 9 October 2006
- Recorded: June 2006
- Genre: Rock, Christian Rock
- Length: 78:00
- Label: Furious?
- Producer: Delirious?

Delirious? chronology
The Mission Bell (2005)	Now Is the Time (2006)	Kingdom of Comfort (2008)

Professional ratings
Review scores
Source	Rating
Cross Rhythms	9/10 stars
Jesus Freak Hideout	(CD) (DVD)

Now Is the Time is the fourth full live album by the band Delirious?. In June 2006, Delirious? attended Willow Creek Community Church to record a live concert DVD. The DVD is accompanied with a CD, and it was released in the UK on 9 October and in the USA on 17 October.

== Track listing ==
=== CD ===
1. "Here I Am Send Me" (Martin Smith, Stu Garrard, Jon Thatcher, Stewart Smith, Tim Jupp)
2. "Rain Down" (Smith, Garrard) / "Did You Feel the Mountains Tremble? – Reprise" (Smith)
3. "Solid Rock" (Smith, Garrard, Thatcher, Smith, Jupp)
4. "Now Is the Time" (Smith, Garrard, Thatcher, Smith, Jupp, Matt Redman)
5. "Our God Reigns" (Smith, Garrard, Thatcher, Smith, Jupp)
6. "What a Friend I've Found" (Smith)
7. "Miracle Maker" (Smith, Garrard, Thatcher, Smith, Jupp)
8. "Paint the Town Red" (Smith, Garrard, Thatcher, Smith, Jupp)
9. "Every Little Thing" (Smith, Garrard)
10. "I Could Sing of Your Love Forever" (Smith)
11. "Take Off My Shoes" (Smith, Garrard, Thatcher, Smith, Jupp)
12. "Majesty (Here I Am)" (Garrard, Smith)
13. "Our God Reigns – Reprise" (Smith, Garrard, Thatcher, Smith, Jupp)
14. "All This Time" (Smith, Garrard, Thatcher, Smith, Jupp)
15. "Our God Reigns" Radio Edit (Smith, Garrard, Thatcher, Smith, Jupp)

=== DVD ===
1. "Here I Am Send Me" (Smith, Garrard, Thatcher, Smith, Jupp)
2. "Rain Down" (Smith, Garrard)
3. "Did You Feel the Mountains Tremble? – Reprise" (Smith)
4. "Solid Rock" (Smith, Garrard, Thatcher, Smith, Jupp)
5. "Now Is the Time" (Smith, Garrard, Thatcher, Smith, Jupp, Redman)
6. "Our God Reigns" (Smith, Garrard, Thatcher, Smith, Jupp)
7. "What a Friend I've Found" (Smith)
8. "Miracle Maker" (Smith, Garrard, Thatcher, Smith, Jupp)
9. "History Maker" (Smith)
10. "Paint the Town Red" (Smith, Garrard, Thatcher, Smith, Jupp)
11. "Every Little Thing" (Smith, Garrard) / "I Could Sing of Your Love Forever" (Smith)
12. "Take Off My Shoes" (Smith, Garrard, Thatcher, Smith, Jupp)
13. "Majesty (Here I Am)" (Garrard, Smith)
14. "Our God Reigns – Reprise" (Smith, Garrard, Thatcher, Smith, Jupp)
15. "Investigate" (Smith, Garrard)

== Charts ==
Weekly chart performance for Now Is The Time/Live At // Willow Creek. Chicago. U.S.A
Chart (2006)	Peak position
US Christian Albums (Billboard)	45
