= Access:d =

Live album by Delirious?
- Released: 30 November 2002
- Genre: Rock, Christian Rock
- Length: 116:21
- Label: Furious?
- Producer: Delirious?

Delirious? chronology
Touch (2002)	Access:d (2002)	World Service (2003)

Professional ratings
Review scores
Source	Rating
Jesus Freak Hideout	5/5 stars
The Phantom Tollbooth	3.5/5 stars

Access:d is a live album by the band Delirious?.

== Track listing ==
=== Disc one ===
1. "Access:d Part 1 (Touch)" (Martin Smith, Stuart Garrard) – 1:44
2. "Deeper" (Smith, Garrard) – 4:19
3. "God's Romance" (Smith) – 5:54
4. "My Glorious" (Smith, Garrard) – 6:22
5. "Access:d Part 2 (Blindfold)" (Smith) – 4:00
6. "Love Is The Compass" (Smith, Garrard) – 3:52
7. "Touch" (Smith, Garrard) – 5:03
8. "Access:d Part 3 (Rain Down)" (Smith, Garrard) – 4:21
9. "Follow" (Smith, Garrard) – 4:35
10. "Happy Song" (Smith) – 3:37
11. "Heaven" (Smith, Garrard) – 4:55
12. "History Maker" (Smith) – 8:40

=== Disc two ===
1. "Bliss" (Smith, Garrard) – 4:33
2. "Show Me Heaven" (Smith, Garrard) – 3:15
3. "Sanctify" (Garrard, Smith) – 4:43
4. "I Could Sing of Your Love Forever" (Smith) – 4:27
5. "Take Me Away" (Smith, Garrard) – 3:37
6. "Fire" (Smith, Garrard) – 3:56
7. "Everything" (Smith, Garrard) – 4:54
8. "King of Fools" (Garrard, Smith) – 3:23
9. "Jesus' Blood" (Smith) – 4:35
10. "Hang on To You" (Smith) – 5:50
11. "Access:d Part 4 (If We'd Ask)" (Kevin Prosch) – 1:45
12. "Access:d Part 5 (Dance in the River)" (Smith) – 3:05
13. "Access:d Part 6 (Lord You Have My Heart)" (Smith) – 2:27
14. "Investigate" (Smith, Garrard) – 8:12

== Personnel ==
Delirious?

- Martin Smith – vocals, guitars
- Tim Jupp – keyboards
- Stuart Garrard – electric guitars, acoustic guitars, vocals
- Jon Thatcher – bass guitar
- Stew Smith – drums, percussion

Additional singers

- United Colors of Sound – choir (16-19)

=== Production ===
- Delirious? – producers
- Martin Smith – mixing at The Esselle Beat Company (Brighton, UK)
- Kevin Stagg – mix assistant
- Chris Blair – mastering at Abbey Road Studios (London, UK)
- Phil Smee – cover design concept, artwork
- Mark Debnam – design
- Giles Iambert – design
- Stew Smith – design
- Andy Hutch – photography
- Matt Moss – photography
- Tony Patolo – management

== Release history ==
Region	Date
United Kingdom	30 November 2002
United States	8 April 2003
