= White Ribbon Day =

White Ribbon Day may refer to:

- "White Ribbon Day" (song), the 1997 and first single released by rock band Delirious?
- 6 December, the Canadian National Day of Remembrance and Action on Violence Against Women
- 25 November, UN designated International Day for the Elimination of Violence against Women
