= History Maker =

1997 song by Delirious?

Song by Delirious?

from the album King of Fools
- Recorded: 1997
- Genre: Rock
- Length: 6:33
- Label: Furious? Records
- Songwriter: Martin Smith
- Producers: Andy Piercy; Delirious?

"History Maker" is the eleventh track on English Christian rock band Delirious?'s album King of Fools. It has become one of the band's best-known songs, and represents King of Fools in almost every one of their live setlists, along with the single "Deeper". "History Maker" was originally recorded as a guitar-driven six-minute rock epic, filled out by strings and synthesisers and featuring two 16-bar guitar solos. The lyrics of the song are on the power of prayer and becoming a "history maker"; i.e., someone who changes the course of history. "History Maker" became the theme song for Teen Mania's 97-98 Acquire the Fire tour, as well as Extreme Dream's YC 2000 in Alberta, Canada.

The song is greatly extended live, generally featuring the "Holy is the Lord" bridge of "God's Romance" and an extemporaneous speech by Martin Smith. The guitar solo is also occasionally extended (up to 40 bars), and the chorus of the song "Obsession" is often included after the "God's Romance" section. Martin Smith often announces this song with the sentence "This song is for all the history makers" at live concerts.

== Single release ==
"History Makers"

Single by Delirious?

from the album History Makers
- Released: 28 March 2010
- Genre: Worship; Rock; Christian rock
- Label: Furious? Records
- Songwriter: Martin Smith

Delirious? singles chronology
"Love Will Find A Way" (2008)	"History Makers" (2010)

In February 2010, a campaign began on social networking site Facebook to get 'History Maker' into the UK charts for Easter. In response to the increasing support for the campaign, the decision was made to release the track as a single under the title 'History Makers'. The song was released for download on 28 March 2010. Two versions have been made available, the original studio version (featured on the album King of Fools and the 2009 compilation album History Makers), and a new live version taken from the band's final live album: 'Farewell Show'.

All profits generated from the single will go towards the charity CompassionArt a charity set up by Martin Smith the lead singer of the band which creates freedom from poverty.

It entered the midweek chart at number 6 on 31 March 2010 and reached number 4 on 4 April 10. but only spent a week in the Top 40 after dropping to No.61 the next week. It was number 1 in the Indie singles chart.

=== Track listing ===
1. History Makers (Studio Version)
2. History Makers (Live Version)

== Charts ==
Weekly chart performance for "History Makers"
Chart (2010)	Peak position
Euro Digital Song Sales (Billboard)	11
Scottish Singles Sales (Official Charts)	4
UK Indie (Official Charts)	1
UK Singles (Official Charts)	4

== Song appearances ==
- King of Fools (1997 studio album) - 6:33
- d:tour 1997 Live at Southampton (1998 live album) - 6:04
- Deeper (2001 compilation album) - 6:33
- Access:d (2002 live album) - 8:40
- UP: Unified Praise (2003 live album) - 10:05
- Now Is the Time - Live at Willow Creek (2006 live CD+DVD) - at the DVD only
- My Soul Sings (2009 live CD+DVD)
- History Makers (2009 compilation album) - 6:33
- Farewell Show: Live in London (2010 live CD+Blu Ray/DVD of final show) - 10:06
