= The Mission Bell =

Studio album by Delirious?
- Released: 7 November 2005
- Studios: ICC Studios (Sussex, UK); Chapel Lane Studios (Hereford, UK).
- Genres: Rock, Christian rock
- Length: 55:05
- Label: Sparrow/Furious?
- Producers: Sam Gibson and Delirious?

Delirious? chronology
World Service (2003)	The Mission Bell (2005)	Now Is The Time (2006.)

Professional ratings
Review scores
Source	Rating
Cross Rhythms	10/10 stars
Christianity Today	4.5/5 stars
Jesus Freak Hideout	4/5 stars
The Phantom Tollbooth	
Q	3/5 stars

The Mission Bell is the sixth studio album by Delirious?. It was released in the UK on 7 November 2005 and in the US on 27 December 2005.

== Singles ==
On 10 October 2005, Delirious? released "Paint the Town Red" as a single. It entered the UK Singles Charts at No. 56.

On 22 January 2006, "Our God Reigns" debuted at No. 1 on the UK Cross Rhythms radio chart. It stayed at the top for another week before dropping to Nos. 2 and 5, finally falling out of the top ten altogether.

On 16 April 2006, "Here I Am Send Me" debuted at No. 1 on the UK Cross Rhythms radio chart. It remained at No. 1 for four weeks before dropping to No. 2, then out of the charts completely.

== Track listing ==
All tracks are written by Martin Smith, Stu Garrard, Jon Thatcher, Stewart Smith and Tim Jupp, except where noted.

Album release
No.	Title	Writer(s)	Length
1.	"Stronger"		4:51
2.	"Now Is the Time"	M. Smith, Garrard, Thatcher, S. Smith, Jupp, Matt Redman	4:05
3.	"Solid Rock" (featuring tobyMac)		4:33
4.	"All This Time"		5:26
5.	"Miracle Maker"		5:44
6.	"Here I Am, Send Me"		4:13
7.	"Fires Burn"		4:18
8.	"Our God Reigns"		5:41
9.	"Love Is a Miracle" (featuring DJ A Skillz)		3:48
10.	"Paint the Town Red"		2:19
11.	"Take Off My Shoes"		6:28
12.	"I'll See You" (featuring Moya Brennan & Stephen Mason of Jars of Clay)		3:44
Total length:			55:05

== Personnel ==
Delirious?

- Martin Smith – vocals, guitars
- Stu Garrard – guitars, vocals
- Tim Jupp – keyboards
- Jon Thatcher – bass
- Stewart Smith – drums, percussion

Additional musicians

- Stephen Mason – pedal steel guitar (12)
- Tim Harries – string arrangements
- Gerard Le Feuvre – cello
- Nick Evans-Pughe – violin
- Steve Morris – violin
- TobyMac – hymn preach (3)
- Faye Simpson – backing vocals (9)
- A Skillz – sound bites (9)
- Moya Brennan – backing vocals (12)

== Production ==
- Martin Smith – producer
- Stu Garrard – producer
- Sam Gibson – producer, recording, mixing
- Chris Blair – mastering at Abbey Road Studios (London, UK)
- Mark Debnam – creative director, design
- Stewart Smith – creative director, design
- Jimmy Abegg – photography
- Joshua Dunford – photography

== Charts ==
Chart performance for The Mission Bell
Chart (2006)	Peak position
US Top Christian Albums (Billboard)	29
