= History Makers =

Greatest hits album by Delirious?
- Released: 2 November 2009
- Recorded: 1993–2009
- Genres: Rock, Christian rock
- Label: Furious?
- Producer: Delirious?

Delirious? chronology
My Soul Sings (2009)	History Makers (2009)	Farewell Show (2010)

Professional ratings
Review scores
Source	Rating
AllMusic	4.5/5 stars
Jesus Freak Hideout	3.5/5 stars

History Makers is a compilation album by the band Delirious?. It was announced by lead singer Martin Smith during an interview promoting their live album, My Soul Sings. It was released on November 2, 2009, in conjunction with the band's final "History Makers" tour of the UK and mainland Europe. Delirious? previously released two other compilation albums: Deeper, which contained their best-known worship songs, and Libertad, which also contained worship songs re-recorded in Spanish.

Two versions of the album have been made available for general sale. The first is a standard edition, containing fourteen of the band's best-known tracks from their worship back catalog, aimed at congregational audiences. The second is a limited-edition version, containing 31 tracks spread over two discs. It also contains a DVD featuring the band's music videos and a fifty-eight-page color hardback book covering the history of the band.

== Standard version track listing ==
1. "History Maker"
2. "Deeper"
3. "Rain Down"
4. "Majesty (Here I Am)"
5. "I Could Sing of Your Love Forever"
6. "Did You Feel the Mountains Tremble?"
7. "Shout to the North"
8. "Revival Town"
9. "Find Me in the River"
10. "My Soul Sings"
11. "Our God Reigns"
12. "My Glorious"
13. "Obsession"
14. "Lord, You Have My Heart"

== Limited edition track listing ==
=== CD 1 ===
1. "Did You Feel the Mountains Tremble?"
2. "Rain Down"
3. "History Maker"
4. "My Soul Sings"
5. "Happy Song"
6. "Shout to the North"
7. "Lord, You Have My Heart"
8. "Obsession"
9. "Majesty (Here I Am)"
10. "My Glorious"
11. "Find Me in the River"
12. "I Could Sing of Your Love Forever"
13. "We Give You Praise"
14. "What a Friend I've Found"

=== CD 2 ===
1. "Deeper"
2. "Inside Outside"
3. "Bliss"
4. "Sanctify"
5. "It's OK"
6. "Love Will Find a Way"
7. "Heaven"
8. "Stronger"
9. "Take Me Away"
10. "Every Little Thing"
11. "Investigate"
12. "All the Way"
13. "Promise"
14. "There Is an Angel"
15. "Paint the Town Red"
16. "Solid Rock"
17. "God Is Smiling"

=== DVD ===
1. "Deeper"
2. "Promise"
3. "Sanctify"
4. "See the Star"
5. "Gravity"
6. "Pursuit of Happiness"
7. "It's OK"
8. "Everything"
9. "Waiting for the Summer"
10. "Take Me Away"
11. "I Could Sing of Your Love Forever"
12. "Inside Outside"
13. "Love Will Find a Way"

Bonus: "History in the Making''
