= UP: Unified Praise =

Unified Praise

Live album by Hillsong Church and Delirious?
- Released: 1 November 2004
- Recorded: 2003, Sydney SuperDome
- Genre: Praise & worship
- Length: 89:10
- Label: Hillsong Music Australia
- Producer: Darlene Zschech and Delirious?

Professional ratings
Review scores
Source	Rating
AllMusic	3/5 stars
Cross Rhythms	(10/10)

UP: Unified Praise is a live praise and worship album of Praise & worship by the Australian Hillsong Church and English band Delirious?. The album reached No. 24 on the Top Christian Albums Chart.

== Making of the album ==
UP: Unified Praise was recorded live at the Sydney SuperDome by Darlene Zschech and the Hillsong Team with special guests Delirious? at the Hillsong Conference 2003, at which there were over 20,000 people.

== Track listing ==
Note: The album was released as an audio-only release and as a concert video. The lengths listed are from the CD version. "King Of Majesty" was 04:16 on the DVD.

• 01. — "Everyday" (Joel Houston) — 05:21

• 02. — "Free" (Marty Sampson) — 04:08

• 03. — "I Give You My Heart" (Reuben Morgan) — 08:09

• 04. — "More Than Life" (Morgan) — 09:09

• 05. — "Worthy Is The Lamb" (Darlene Zschech) — 06:18

• 06. — "I Could Sing Of Your Love Forever"/"God's Romance" (Martin Smith) — 08:14

• 07. — "King Of Majesty" (Sampson) — 04:11

• 08. — "Did You Feel The Mountains Tremble" (Smith) — 09:57

• 09. — "My Glorious" (Smith, Stu Garrard) — 07:08

• 10. — "Rain Down" (Smith, Garrard) — 06:24

• 11. — "Majesty (Here I Am)" (Garrard, Smith) – 06:10

• 12. — "What A Friend I've Found" (Smith) — 05:27

• 13. — "History Maker" (Smith) — 10:07

== Charts ==
Weekly chart performance for Unified: Praise -- Live Worship Sydney Australia
Chart (2005)	Peak position
US Christian Albums (Billboard)	24

== Featured musicians ==
- Marcus Beaumont – electric guitar
- Michael Guy Chislett – electric guitar
- Mitch Farmer – drums
- Ian Fisher – bass guitar
- Rolf Wam Fjell – drums
- Brandon Gillies – drums
- Nigel Hendroff – electric guitar
- Luke Holmes – electric guitar
- Luke Munns – drums
- Albert Sampson – electric guitar
- Nathan Taylor – electric guitar
- Matt Tennikoff – bass guitar
