= Electralyte =

- Origin: Essex, England
- Genres: Rock
- Years active: 2004–2009, 2024–present
- Labels: Paperdart Records, distributed by Fierce
- Members: Matt Leeder; Paul Leverett; Jon Mitson; Dave Griffiths

Electralyte are a four-piece British rock band from Chelmsford, Essex. Their debut album was titled Breakout, and they released a follow-up album Scratch Beneath the Surface in July 2008. They were distributed by Fierce Distribution in the UK. The band had a Brit-rock sound but were noted for mixing in other musical styles and influences.

== History ==
The band formed in 2004, when Matt Leeder, Paul Leverett and Jon Mitson decided to pursue forming a full-time band. Leverett and Leeder met when they played for another band. At the time Leverett was working as a freelance record producer and recording engineer and Leeder was working for the Salvation Army in London. The name Electralyte was chosen because they liked the sound of it, but it was also deemed appropriate due to an Electrolyte's role in creating energy.

The first full-length CD Breakout was recorded with ICC in the UK. Leeder was the principal songwriter and the album was released in 2006. The song "Take Broken Me" featured a full Salvation Army brass band, organised through Leeder's Salvation Army work.

The band played at music festivals such as Nth Fest, Cazfest, Fling Fest and Greenbelt and supported Delirious? on their Omnisonic tour towards the end of 2007.

Electralyte split up in 2009.

== Scratch beneath the surface ==
In July 2008, Electralyte released the album Scratch Beneath the Surface, which is distributed by Fierce Distribution in the UK. The album contained twelve songs written by Leeder, and is their first album which featured Dave Griffiths as the fourth member of the band. A professional CD review of the album at Blaze magazine was favourable saying the band has "... a quintessentially British sound and yet show enough new tricks to keep things fresh."

== Members ==
- Matt Leeder - Lead Vocal, Guitar
- Paul Leverett - Bass
- Jon Mitson - Drums
- Dave Griffiths - Guitar

== Discography ==
- Freedom EP (2005)
- Breakout (2006)
- Scratch Beneath the Surface (2008)
- Jealousy EP (2009)
