= Cutting Edge (recordings) =

Cutting Edge is a series of recordings made by the British rock band Delirious?. The songs were originally written for a regular youth event, Cutting Edge, in the band's home town of Littlehampton. Through this, the band gained its first name, The Cutting Edge Band, which was later changed to Delirious? when the band went full-time in 1996.

Reviewing the 1998 United States release, CCM magazine found that the band had created "a modern hymnody for generations raised on rock 'n 'roll." One major lyrical break from older styles of hymns.

== Releases ==
The recordings were originally released in four separate cassette tapes to be sold at the events. However, the recordings are now sold on compact disc, with the Delirious? branding. In the United Kingdom, the recordings are available on two CDs: Cutting Edge 1 and 2 and Cutting Edge 3 and Fore. In 2007, they were re-released as a double album, Cutting Edge One, Two, Three and Fore. In North America, they were released in 1998 as a single, two-disc album, Cutting Edge. The North American version was certified Gold in Canada by the CRIA and the band's distributor CMC Distribution.

Cutting Edge 1 and 2

Studio album by Delirious?
- Released: 1994
- Genre: Worship, Christian rock
- Length: 64:48
- Label: Furious?
- Producer: Andy Piercy

Delirious? chronology
Cutting Edge 1 and 2 (1994)	Cutting Edge 3 and Fore (1995)

== Cutting Edge 1 ==
Cutting Edge 1 was released in June 1993. It was the first ever release by Delirious?, then known as The Cutting Edge Band. It contains the first song ever written by the band as a unit, "Lord, You Have My Heart".

At the time of recording, the band only consisted of lead singer and recording engineer Martin Smith, his friend and colleague Tim Jupp (who played keyboards) and drummer Stew Smith, who did youth work for the Cutting Edge events. Additional musicians were Dave Clifton (lead guitar), Jim Bryan (bass guitar), Martin Neil (percussion), along with backing vocals by Vanessa Gibbs, Helen Burgess and Andy Piercy. At the time, future bassist Jon Thatcher worked selling the tapes at the Cutting Edge events.

Cutting Edge 1 later became available on the Cutting Edge 1 and 2 CD compilation and again on the Cutting Edge compilation of all four EPs.

== Cutting Edge 2 ==
Cutting Edge 2 was released almost a year later, in April 1994. By this point, guitarist Stu G had joined the band, and is present for the first time on this recording. Cutting Edge 2 contained the fan favorite, "The Happy Song", which was later remixed for the band's compilation album Deeper. It also included what is arguably the band's most famous song, "I Could Sing of Your Love Forever". Besides being widely covered and sung in churches around the world, it peaked at No. 40 on the UK Singles Chart.

Additional musicians were Les Driscoll (bass), Terl Bryant (additional percussion), Jenny Legg (backing vocals), Bob Brookes (harmonica), and Richard Causon (Hammond organ). At this point, Jon Thatcher still had not joined the band, despite the fact he is credited as bass player in the sleeve notes of the Cutting Edge 1 and 2 compilation.

Cutting Edge 2 later became available on the Cutting Edge 1 and 2 CD compilation and again on the Cutting Edge compilation of all four EPs.

Cutting Edge 3 and Fore

Studio album by Delirious?
- Released: 1995
- Genre: Worship, Christian Rock
- Length: 69:13
- Label: Furious?
- Producer: Andy Piercy

Delirious? chronology
Cutting Edge 1 and 2 (1994)	Cutting Edge 3 and Fore (1995)	Live & In The Can (1996)

== Cutting Edge 3 (Red Tape) ==
Cutting Edge 3, also known as Red Tape, was released in May 1995. The EP contained some of Delirious?'s most popular songs "Did You Feel The Mountains Tremble?", "I've Found Jesus", and "I'm Not Ashamed".

Additional musicians were Dudley Philips (bass), Chris Hutchinson (Hammond organ), along with Jussy McLean and Andy Piercy on backing vocals. Joss Ambrose played the didgeridoo on one track.

Cutting Edge 3 was included on the Cutting Edge 3 and 4 CD compilation and again on the Cutting Edge compilation of all four EPs.

== Cutting Edge Fore ==
Cutting Edge Fore was released shortly after Red Tape in December 1995. By this point, Jon Thatcher had joined the band as bass player, after filling in when a previous bassist could not perform at the event. He was the last official member of Delirious? to join before Paul Evans replaced Stew Smith as drummer in 2008. "Louder Than The Radio" was later re-recorded for the American version of the band's first full album, King of Fools. Jussy McLean returned to record backing vocals for all seven tracks.

Cutting Edge 4 was included on the Cutting Edge 3 and 4 CD compilation and again on the Cutting Edge compilation of all four EPs.

Cutting Edge

Studio album by Delirious?

US Version
- The cover art for 'Cutting Edge' released in 1998.

Professional ratings
Review scores
Source	Rating
CCM	

== Track listing ==
All songs written by Martin Smith

=== Cutting Edge 1 ===
1. "Message of the Cross" – 4:46
2. "Singer's Song" – 4:29
3. "Lord, You Have My Heart" – 2:57
4. "What Is This Thing Called Love?" – 5:00
5. "The Crucible for Silver" – 3:44
6. "Thank You for Saving Me" – 7:02

=== Cutting Edge 2 ===
1. "The Happy Song" – 4:28
2. "Prophet Song" – 7:49
3. "King of Love" – 2:50
4. "Coming Back" – 5:07
5. "Lead Me" – 6:02
6. "I Could Sing of Your Love Forever" – 6:09

=== Cutting Edge 3: Red Tape ===
1. "Did You Feel the Mountains Tremble?" – 9:45
2. "I've Found Jesus" – 4:56
3. "Oh Lead Me" – 4:52
4. "Shaken Up" – 5:34
5. "I'm Not Ashamed" – 6:43
6. "Find Me in the River" – 5:11

=== Cutting Edge Fore ===
1. "Louder Than the Radio" – 4:08
2. "You Split the Earth" – 4:56
3. "When All Around Has Fallen" – 6:02
4. "I've Searched for Gold" – 3:16
5. "Shout to the North" – 4:14
6. "All I Want Is You" – 5:06
7. "Obsession" – 8:34

== Charts ==
Chart performance for The Cutting Edge
Chart (1998)	Peak position
US Christian Albums (Billboard)	18

== Certifications ==
Certifications for The Cutting Edge
Region	Certification	Certified units/sales
Canada (Music Canada)	Gold	50,000^{^}
United States (RIAA)	Gold	500,000^{^}
^{^} Shipments figures based on certification alone.
