= Audio Lessonover? =

Studio album by Delirious?
- Released: 6 August 2001
- Genre: Rock, Christian rock
- Length: 62:06
- Label: Furious?
- Producer: Chuck Zwicky

Delirious? chronology
Glo (2000)	Audio Lessonover? (2001)	Deeper (2001)

Audio Lessonover? is the fourth studio album by the Christian rock band Delirious?, released in August 2001. It gathered considerably less critical acclaim than previous Delirious? albums, both musically and in its lack of overtly Christian lyrics. The sole single released from the album, Waiting for the Summer, reached number 26 in the UK Singles Charts; "Take Me Away", originally planned to be the second single, was released to MP3.com as a free download.

== Background, writing and recording ==
Following the more experimental music of Mezzamorphis and Glo, Delirious aimed for a "stripped-down" pop sound on their new album, influenced by, among others, Coldplay, Radiohead, and the Manic Street Preachers. Many of the songs were recorded semi-live in the studio, giving the album a raw feel.

Chuck Zwicky (former engineer for Prince and Semisonic) was brought in to oversee production of the album. According to Stu G, Zwicky was very influential in the recording of the album: "From our beginning we’ve really had a hands-on approach to the production. And we asked him to really take that on. So he did make a difference to the way we recorded the stuff and to really get a strip-down, more live performance. And that was really good to be pushed that way, and he pushed us really hard." The band also credit him with creating a retro sound: "we walked into the studio and Tim [Jupp] started to set up, and Charles said (rather less politely) ‘Put them away, I'm not having that rubbish in my studio.' Instead, he got Tim to play analogue synths and Fender Rhodes through guitar pedals, and rather than relying on MIDI to do everything Tim was twisting knobs and creating audio canvasses that were absolutely incredible."

== Content ==
The album's lyrical content differs somewhat from previous albums, including several love songs. Martin Smith said of the first single, "Waiting for the Summer", "The song came about because we were travelling to Brighton everyday and in usual style it was raining... We thought we'd write a song about waiting for the summer because we used to say to each other, 'I can't wait for summer'. It's a love song about being with my lady in summer, laughing and dancing around." Another track, "There is an Angel", was written by Smith about "waking up one night and seeing my wife asleep in bed next to me and just thinking, God, I could mess this up if I'm not careful. She's the angel you've put in my life and I need to protect what you've given me." Smith has said that the song is his all-time favourite.

Among the more obscure songs lyrically is another love song, "Bicycle Gasoline"; Smith has, however, explained it: "girls, they don't want flowers all the time, they just need telling that you love them, and vice-versa. A bicycle doesn't need gasoline and she doesn't need all that stuff really. She doesn't need 'things', jewellery or dresses, she just needs love. You know, love man!"

== Promotion and singles ==
During 2001, Delirious? embarked on an extensive publicity campaign, including supporting Bon Jovi and Matchbox 20 in the five-date "One Wild Night" UK stadium tour On the last date of the tour, the band announced a release date of 6 August for the album. Once again, mainstream chart success for the band was hindered by the refusal of BBC Radio One, the UK national pop station, to playlist the singles. The album title itself is an anagram of "Radio One Loves Us" reflecting past struggles for airplay on the station.

== Reception and critical response ==
Professional ratings
Review scores
Source	Rating
Cross Rhythms	7/10 stars
Jesus Freak Hideout	3.5/5 stars
Q Magazine	3/5 stars
The Phantom Tollbooth	mixed

The album received mixed reviews from the major music critics. Despite the band's aim to create a pop album, some reviewers called Audio Lessonover? the band's least accessible album to date; the Phantom Tollbooth, however, thought it the most accessible Delirious album yet. Q Magazine, the only mainstream magazine to review the album, praised the band's "complex, Muse-alike rock", commenting also on the band's difficulty in catering to both the Christian and mainstream markets.

The album's sales were lower than previous mainstream efforts, debuting at No. 58 in the UK Album Chart.

== Track listing ==
1. "Waiting for the Summer" (Martin Smith, Stuart Garrard) – 3:25
2. "Take Me Away" (Smith, Garrard) – 3:24
3. "Love is the Compass" (Smith, Garrard) – 3:32
4. "Alien" (Smith) – 4:21
5. "Angel in Disguise" (Garrard, Smith) – 4:32
6. "Rollercoaster" (Garrard, Smith) – 3:46
7. "Fire" (Garrard, Smith) – 3:35
8. "There is an Angel" (Smith) – 5:15
9. "Bicycle Gasoline" (Garrard, Smith) – 4:55
10. "A Little Love" (Smith) – 4:10
11. "Show Me Heaven" (Smith, Garrard) – 3:23
12. "America" (Smith) – 3:29
13. "Stealing Time" (Garrard, Smith) – 14:12

-Hidden track starts at 12:10

== Personnel ==
Delirious?

- Martin Smith – vocals, guitars, string arrangements (3)
- Tim Jupp – keyboards, additional programming
- Stuart Garrard – acoustic guitars, electric guitars, backing vocals
- Jon Thatcher – bass
- Stewart Smith – drums, percussion, backing vocals

Additional musicians

- Chuck Zwicky – Mellotron (1, 3, 6, 9, 12), string arrangements (3), atmospheric sounds (4), Prophet-5 (6), trumpet (13), orchestrations, arrangements
- John Fields – string arrangements (3)
- Cathy Burton – backing vocals

Production

- Chuck Zwicky – producer, recording, at Clarion Studios, Brighton, UK; Mill House Studio, Wiltshire, UK; Furious? Records, Arundel, West Sussex, UK, mixing at Ford Lane Studios, Ford, West Sussex, UK, editing
- John Fields – string recording (3)
- Paul Inder – additional editing (3)
- Stuart Garrard – "Acid Pro" audio editing
- Chris Blair – mastering at Abbey Road Studios, London, UK
- Giles Lambert – creative direction, art direction, design
- Stewart Smith – creative direction, art direction, design
- Mitch Jenkins – photography

CD-ROM credits

- Andy Hutch – film director
- Mark Debnam – producer, design
- Paul Norcross – producer, design
- The Duke – producer, design
- Matt Moss – photography

== Charts ==
Chart performance for Audio Lessonover
Chart (2001)	Peak position
Scottish Albums (OCC)	96
UK Albums (OCC)	58
