= Love Will Find a Way (Delirious? song) =

Single by Delirious?

from the album Kingdom of Comfort
- Released: 17 November 2008
- Recorded: 2008
- Genre: Rock, Christian rock
- Label: Furious?
- Songwriters: Martin Smith; Stuart Garrard; Jon Thatcher
- Producer: Delirious?

Delirious? singles chronology
"Paint the Town Red" (2005)	"Love Will Find a Way" (2008)	"History Maker" (2010)

"Love Will Find a Way" is a single from the British rock band, Delirious?, and is taken from their 2008 album, Kingdom of Comfort. The single was announced at the start of the band's Kingdom of Comfort UK tour, which began in October 2008. It was sold as three discs: two CDs containing different versions of the song, and a DVD which features the music video. It is also available from digital music retailer iTunes Store. It was released on 17 November 2008. It reached No. 55 in the UK charts in its first week.

== Track listings ==
CD1

1. "Love Will Find a Way" (radio version)
2. "Mothers of the Night"

CD2

1. "Love Will Find a Way" (album version)
2. "Love Will Find a Way" (acoustic version)
3. "Love Will Find a Way" (remix)

DVD

1. "Love Will Find a Way" (video)
2. "Kingdom of Comfort Electronic Press Kit"

== Charts ==
Weekly chart performance for "Love Will Find a Way"
Chart (2008)	Peak position
UK Singles (OCC)	55
