= Promise (Delirious? song) =

Single by Delirious?

from the album King Of Fools
- Released: 14 July 1997
- Genre: Rock, Christian rock
- Length: 3:32
- Label: Furious? Records
- Songwriter: Martin Smith

Delirious? singles chronology
"Deeper" (1997)	"Promise" (1997)	"Deeper (EP)" (1997)

"Promise" is the third single from Delirious?'s debut album, King Of Fools, on which it is the sixth track. It was released as a single on 14 July 1997 and reached number 20 on the UK Singles Charts. The song also appears on the band's live album, d:tour 1997 Live at Southampton.

== Music video ==
The music video shows the band playing in a darkened room with light bulbs flicking on and off. The video is intercut with various different people falling down and one person, a young Jordan Chaos, from the metal band A New Way To Trust, falling off his bike. The band also all fall down at the end of the video.

== Track listing ==
CD1

1. "Promise" (Radio Edit)
2. "Deeper" (Mark Edwards Summertime Mix)
3. "You Split the Earth"

CD2

1. "Promise" (Live Acoustic Version)
2. "Deeper" (Mark Edwards Prophet Mix)
3. d:Interview

== Charts ==
Weekly chart performance for "Promise"
Chart (1997)	Peak position
UK Singles (Official Charts)	20
