= Paint the Town Red (Delirious? song) =

"Paint The Town Red"

Single by Delirious?

from the album The Mission Bell
- Released: 10 October 2005
- Recorded: 2005
- Genre: Rock, Christian rock
- Length: 2:19
- Label: Furious
- Songwriters: Martin Smith, Stu Garrard, Jon Thatcher, Stewart Smith and Tim Jupp
- Producer: Delirious?

Delirious? singles chronology
"Every Little Thing" (2004)	"Paint The Town Red" (2005)	"Love Will Find a Way" (2008)

"Paint The Town Red" is a single from and the tenth track on Delirious?'s album, The Mission Bell. It was released on 10 October 2005 to iTunes UK and the two high street music stores Virgin and HMV. The single entered the UK Singles Chart at No. 56. This was their lowest hit ever, and the first not to reach the UK Top 40 since "White Ribbon Day".

== Track listings ==
1. "Paint the Town Red" (Album Version) - 2:19
2. "Paint the Town Red" (Audiostar Re-Mix) - 3:02
3. "Rain Down" (Audiostar Re-Mix) - 4:00

== Charts ==
Weekly chart performance for "Paint the Town Red"
Chart (2005)	Peak position
UK Singles (OCC)	20
