= Mezzamorphis =

Studio album by Delirious?
- Released: 12 April 1999
- Recorded: 1998–1999
- Studios: Tortington Park, Sussex, UK; Ground Zero Digital, Sussex, UK; ICC Studios, Sussex, UK; Ford Lane Studios, West Sussex, UK
- Genres: Alternative rock, Christian rock, power pop
- Length: 49:47
- Label: Furious?
- Producer: Delirious?

Delirious? chronology
d:tour (1998)	Mezzamorphis (1999)	Glo (2000)

Alternative Covers
- North American version of Mezzamorphis

Professional ratings
Review scores
Source	Rating
Cross Rhythms	10/10 stars
AllMusic	4/5 stars
Q Magazine	4/5 stars
Jesus Freak Hideout	3.5/5 stars
UNCUT magazine	3/5 stars
Rock Sound	3/5 stars
Exit Zine	4/5 stars

Mezzamorphis is the second studio album by Christian rock band Delirious?. Released in 1999, it represented a large step towards a more electronic sound for the band and received a huge critical acclaim.

Mezzamorphis spawned two UK singles, "See the Star" and "It's OK", both of which landed in the top 20 of the UK Singles Charts, whilst the album itself peaked at No. 25 on the UK Album Charts, giving Delirious? their second top 30 album in a row. The album has since been certified silver in the UK. In the US, "Gravity" was released as the lead single in promotion of the album.

== Recording and production ==
Following their breakthrough 1997 album King of Fools, Delirious? started recording Mezzamorphis in February 1998, and continued to record throughout that year, interspersed with summer tours throughout the US and UK. The band began recording with roughly half the songs already written, and continued writing as they recorded. Most of the recording took place in an old school in West Sussex. In the words of lead vocalist Martin Smith, "We turned a classroom into a control room, and there were some wooden rooms where students used to dine, in which we set up a drum kit with different mike positions. We did the bulk of it there for the first six months in between touring. In the end, we went to a smaller studio in Ford just to finish it off." The band used movable drapes to experiment with different drum sounds and reverbs; most of the drums on the album are thus natural and unprocessed.

Formerly known for a sound similar to that of U2, Delirious? aimed for a more dense and electronic sound, taking inspiration from Radiohead. Producer Tedd T was brought in to add aspects of electronica to the production. Recording was finished at a small studio near Littlehampton, putting the final touches on vocals.

The album was mixed by Jack Joseph Puig in Los Angeles early in 1999. In the words of guitarist Stu G, "Martin and I went out to LA in January for three weeks and sat down with him and explained to him what we were doing and where we were coming from, what we were trying to accomplish with the music. He was very perceptive. He definitely took our tracks and made them into something we couldn't have done ourselves." Puig's mixing of the album deepened the bass sound and brought it more of a "club" feel.

== Content ==
As with the previous album, King of Fools, Mezzamorphis is mostly midtempo; notable exceptions include "Bliss" and "Gravity". The new electronic direction taken by the band incorporated a theremin, played by bassist Jon Thatcher; additionally, Stu G used Revox tape delays to create keyboard-like guitar effects. Classical instruments were also included, including a Salvation Army brass band on "It's OK", an upright bass (also played by Thatcher) on "Kiss Your Feet", and a string quartet throughout the album.

While Mezzamorphis is not strictly a concept album, more than one professional reviewer has pointed out that there is a general theme of getting to heaven running through the whole work. The band have confirmed this, and have also pointed out a theme of change. "Heaven", inspired by the troubles in Northern Ireland, ties the two themes of heaven and change together; according to Smith, "we have to come to realize that we come from the dust, yet we believe one day we'll meet Jesus. In the meantime, we're caught between two worlds. Heaven is my home."

The first track, "Mezzanine Floor", is the change-oriented centrepiece of the album, written about the musical growth of the band. According to Stu G, "we feel that we're at a point where we've left where we were, but we're not yet where we believe we're going to end up. So, we're on the way, in the middle, on the mezzanine floor." "Metamorphis", written solely by Stu G, further explores this theme of change. The name of the album is a mixture of the names of these two tracks (see metamorphosis and mezzanine).

Another strong theme from the album is peer pressure, particularly due to the band's part-Christian-part-mainstream status. The song "Gravity" refers to the opposing influences of Heaven and the secular world pulling the band in opposite directions, whilst "Metamorphis" further explores "the fact that out in the world, although everybody wants to be their own selves, we're pulled this way and that. Everyone you meet wants you to be something or another. The song asks God to help us to be our own true selves, as God sees us, not the way folk pressure us to be what they want us to be." "Bliss" deals with accusations of selling out; in the words of Stu G, "we know exactly where we want to go, we want to take our music to the world and have it recognized as being as good as anything that's out there. But we're not going to compromise or back away from our integrity as Christians."

== Promotion and reception ==
The promotional UK tour featured American rock band Switchfoot as support. Delirious? also performed several songs live at Glastonbury Festival.

The first single, "See the Star", was released in the UK in 1999, selling over 5,000 copies in the first day and 12,000 copies in the first week. This was enough to push it to No. 16 in the UK Singles Charts and No. 2 in the indies — the highest chart position ever held by a Delirious? single. A year later, the band released "It's OK", which entered the singles charts at No. 18 and the indie charts at No. 3. The song was featured an episode of the US television series Get Real. "Gravity" was planned to be released as a single in the UK, but was only released as a radio single in the US, due to Radio One's refusal to playlist the band.

Mezzamorphis was released on 12 April 1999 in the United Kingdom. Despite the extensive publicity campaign, the album debuted at No. 25 in the UK Album Charts and No. 2 in the indies, lower than the band's first album, King of Fools; however, it was the second consecutive Top 30 release for the band. The album also reached No. 2 in the contemporary Christian music charts in America and No. 137 in the Billboard 200 (No. 5 in the Heatseekers) following its 8 June release.

Critical response was generally positive in both the secular and UK Christian music media. Rock Sound magazine praised "the band's talent for writing instant rock/pop songs" and stated, "it shouldn't be long before Delirious? claim their rightful place as one of Britain's brightest new bands", whilst Q magazine named them "the hottest thing in Christian rock" and predicted, "Mezzamorphis will be the album that makes them". The UK Christian music magazine Cross Rhythms awarded the album a full ten-square rating, calling the album an "absolute classic", whilst Jesus Freak Hideout stated, "the musical growth is evident... and appreciated". The album also drew comparisons to U2's anthemic qualities and was praised for its modern production.

In the United States, the Virgin marketed version omitted two songs ("Kiss Your Feet" and "Jesus' Blood") that were included on the Sparrow version. Each of these contained explicit faith references. Additionally, the album caused some controversy in the US Christian music scene due to the lyric "she's as pretty as hell" in the song "It's OK". The band had left the song off promotional copies of the album, and Sparrow Records had considered leaving the song off the album; several Christian retailers dropped the album amongst the complaints. Smith wrote a response to the controversy on the band's website; however, many fans continued to believe that the band had left Christian rock for the secular industry. The band also received criticism for the lack of the word "Jesus" on the album. "We recognise the ultimate validity of the criticisms leveled against us," responded lead singer Martin Smith, "and we feel as a band that this just speaks to the spiritual and intellectual maturity of our listening audience and Christians in general, for that matter."

== Track listing ==
=== UK track listing ===
1. "Mezzanine Floor" (Martin Smith, Stuart Garrard) – 3:44
2. "Heaven" (Smith, Garrard) – 3:59
3. "Follow" (Smith, Garrard) – 4:39
4. "Bliss" (Smith, Garrard) – 3:15
5. "It's OK" (Smith, Garrard) – 4:08
6. "Metamorphis" (Garrard) – 4:20
7. "See The Star" (Smith, Garrard) – 3:30
8. "Gravity" (Garrard, Jonathan Thatcher, Smith) – 3:18
9. "Beautiful Sun" (Garrard) – 4:35
10. "Love Falls Down" (Smith, Garrard) – 3:58
11. "Blindfold" (Smith) – 5:58
12. "Kiss Your Feet" (Smith, Thatcher) – 4:19

=== US track listing (Sparrow Records version) ===
1. "The Mezzanine Floor" (Smith, Garrard) – 3:44
2. "Heaven" (Smith, Garrard) – 3:59
3. "Follow" (Smith, Garrard) – 4:39
4. "Bliss" (Smith, Garrard) – 3:15
5. "Beautiful Sun" (Garrard) – 4:35
6. "Metamorphis" (Garrard) – 4:20
7. "See The Star" (Smith, Garrard) – 3:30
8. "Gravity" (Garrard, Jonathan Thatcher, Smith) – 3:18
9. "It's OK" (Smith, Garrard) – 4:08
10. "Love Falls Down" (Smith, Garrard) – 3:58
11. "Blindfold" (Smith) – 5:58
12. "Kiss Your Feet" (Smith, Thatcher) – 4:19
13. "Jesus' Blood" (Smith) - 5:54
14. "Deeper 99" (Smith, Garrard) - 4:19

=== US track listing (Virgin Records version) ===
1. "The Mezzanine Floor" (Smith, Garrard) – 3:44
2. "Deeper 99" (Smith, Garrard) - 4:19
3. "Heaven" (Smith, Garrard) – 3:59
4. "Follow" (Smith, Garrard) – 4:39
5. "It's OK" (Smith, Garrard) – 4:08
6. "Metamorphis" (Garrard) – 4:20
7. "See The Star" (Smith, Garrard) – 3:30
8. "Gravity" (Garrard, Jonathan Thatcher, Smith) – 3:18
9. "Bliss" (Smith, Garrard) – 3:15
10. "Beautiful Sun" (Garrard) – 4:35
11. "Love Falls Down" (Smith, Garrard) – 3:58
12. "Blindfold" (Smith) – 5:58

== Personnel ==
Delirious?

- Martin Smith – vocals, guitars
- Stuart "Stu G" Garrard – guitars, backing vocals
- Tim Jupp – keyboards, Logic Audio programming
- Jon Thatcher – keyboards, electric bass, upright bass, theremin
- Stewart Smith – drums, percussion, backing vocals

Additional musicians

- Tedd T – additional programming
- Andy Harwood-White – brass
- Steven Mathieson – brass
- Jayne Murrill – brass
- Paul Sharman – brass
- Anthony Thompson – brass
- Nicholas Tollervey – brass
- Matthew Wells – brass
- Douglas Wilson – brass
- Tim Harries – string arrangements
- Tony Patoto – backing vocals

Production

- Lynn Nichols – executive producer
- Delirious? – producers, engineers at Tortington Park, Sussex, UK; Ground Zero Digital, Sussex, UK; ICC Studios, Sussex, UK; Ford Lane Studios, West Sussex, UK
- Julian Kindred – additional engineer
- Martin Smith – recording of sounds to tape
- Stuart "Stu G" Garrard – Otari RADAR engineer
- Tim Jupp – editing
- Jack Joseph Puig – mixing at Ocean Way Recording, Hollywood, California
- Jim Champagne – mix assistant
- Chris Blair – mastering at Abbey Road Studios, London, UK
- Nick Webb – mastering assistant
- Stewart Smith – art direction
- Dan Harding – design
- Robert Fleischauer – location photography
- Andy Hutch – studio photography
- Tony Patoto – band management

== Charts ==
=== Album ===
Chart performance for Mezzamorphis
Chart (1997–1998)	Peak position
Scottish Albums (OCC)	53
UK Albums (OCC)	25
UK Independent Albums (OCC)	3
US Billboard 200	137
US Top Christian Albums (Billboard)	2

=== Singles ===
Year	Title	Peak chart positions		
Year	Title	UK	UK Indie	US Christ CHR
1999	"See the Star"	16	5	7
1999	"It's OK"	18	3	—

=== Other charted songs ===
Year	Title	Peak chart positions	
Year	Title	US Christ CHR	US Christ Rock
1999	"Gravity"	4	12
2000	"Love Falls Down"	7	—
