= Glo (album) =

Studio album by Delirious?
- Released: 29 July 2000 (UK), 10 October 2000 (US)
- Genres: Rock, Christian Rock
- Length: 71:44
- Label: Furious?
- Producers: Tedd T and Delirious?

Delirious? chronology
Mezzamorphis (1999)	Glo (2000)	Audio Lessonover? (2001)

Alternative covers
- US Version of Glo

Alternative cover
- 2007 UK Compilation Release alongside Mezzamorphis (1999)

Professional ratings
Review scores
Source	Rating
Cross Rhythms	10/10 stars
AllMusic	4.5/5 stars
Jesus Freak Hideout	4/5 stars
The Phantom Tollbooth	(not rated)
HM Magazine	(not rated)

Glo is the third full studio album by the band Delirious?. It was released in 2000, just over a year after their previous album Mezzamorphis.

== Track listing ==
No.	Title	Writer(s)	Length
1.	"God You Are My God"	Stu Garrard	3:45
2.	"GLO in the Dark - Part 1"	Garrard	2:45
3.	"God's Romance"	Martin Smith	6:58
4.	"Investigate"	Smith, Garrard	4:09
5.	"GLO in the Dark - Part 2"	Smith, Garrard	3:42
6.	"What Would I Have Done?"	Smith	6:06
7.	"My Glorious"	Smith, Garrard	6:09
8.	"Everything"	Smith, Garrard	3:39
9.	"Hang on to You"	Smith	4:20
10.	"Intimate Stranger"	Smith	7:26
11.	"Awaken the Dawn"	Garrard	4:14
12.	"GLO in the Dark - Part 3"	Garrard	3:37
13.	"The Years Go By"	Smith	3:50
14.	"Jesus' Blood"	Smith	5:54
15.	"GLO in the Dark - Part 4"	Smith	4:58

== Personnel ==
Delirious?

- Martin Smith – lead vocals, additional keyboards, guitars
- Tim Jupp – keyboards, additional programming
- Stuart Garrard – acoustic guitars, electric guitars, additional programming, backing vocals
- Jon Thatcher – electric bass, synth bass
- Stewart Smith – drums, percussion, samples, backing vocals

Additional musicians

- Tedd T – programming
- DJ Kenny Mitchell – turntable tweaks, additional beeps
- Robert A. Ash – bagpipes
- Roderick S. MscDonald – bagpipes
- Hugh MacMillan – bagpipes
- Gerald Le Feuvre – cello, strings (14)
- Jane Kane – strings (14)
- John Kane – strings (14)
- Chian Lim – strings (14)
- Anna Smith – vocal effects (1)
- Sharlene Hector – harmony vocals (2)
- Tasia Tjornhom – additional backing vocals (2)
- Chuck Zwicky – additional backing vocals (2)
- Arun Community Church Choir – choir
- The Grant Choir – choir

== Production ==
- Delirious? – producers
- Tedd T – producer, additional recording
- Chuck Zwicky – recording, mixing
- Martin Smith – additional recording
- Andrew Lower – recording assistant
- Damon Riley – recording assistant
- Andy Searle-Barnes – recording assistant
- Nik Smith – recording assistant
- Neil Stainton – recording assistant
- Paul Burton – monks recording
- Tim Jupp – monks recording
- Chris Blair – mastering
- Giles Lambert – creative direction, art direction
- Stewart Smith – creative direction, art direction
- Andy Hutch – photography
- Mitch Jenkins – photography
- Catherine Hughes – stylist
- Tony Patoto – band management

Studios

- Recorded at Clarion Studios (Brighton, England); Ford Lane Studios (Ford, West Sussex, England); Westside Studios (London, England); Ampleforth Abbey Church (Ampleforth, England); Antenna Studios (Nashville, Tennessee, US).
- Mixed at Jacobs Studios (Farnham, Surrey, England).
- Mastered at Abbey Road Studios (London, England).

== Charts ==
Chart performance for Glo
Chart (2000)	Peak position
US Billboard 200	177
US Top Christian Albums (Billboard)	13
