= King of Fools (album) =

Studio album by Delirious?
- Released: 16 June 1997
- Recorded: December 1996 – January 1997
- Studios: Beltwood House, London, UK
- Genres: Rock, Christian rock
- Length: 61:34
- Label: Furious?
- Producers: Andy Piercy and Delirious?

Delirious? chronology
Live & In the Can (1996)	King of Fools (1997)	d:tour (1998)

Singles from King of Fools
- 1. "White Ribbon Day" Released: 17 February 1997; 2. "Deeper" Released: 5 May 1997; 3. "Promise" Released: 14 July 1997

King of Fools is a studio album by British Christian rock band Delirious?, initially released in June 1997. The full-length project showcased a new mainstream sound, whilst retaining many of the core themes found in their Cutting Edge EPs. Stylistically, the album epitomises the band's similarity to U2, an influence which was highlighted by several critics on its release. King of Fools reached No. 13 on the UK album chart, a career-high for the band, and produced four singles. The second, "Deeper", peaked at No. 20 on the UK singles chart on 11 May 1997. It also includes what is possibly the best known Delirious? song, "History Maker", which the band regularly played live throughout their whole career. The album was listed at No. 85 in the 2001 book, CCM Presents: The 100 Greatest Albums in Christian Music. The album was nominated for a Grammy.

== Background ==
Delirious? was originally known as "The Cutting Edge Band" before 1996. They played regularly at the "Cutting Edge" Christian events held in their hometown of Littlehampton. In August 1995, a major car accident involving lead singer Martin Smith, his wife, and bassist Jon Thatcher, left the former badly injured. The song "August 30th" was inspired by these events. Smith went through a period of depression, before being partly inspired by Bill Flanagan's book U2: At the End of the World, which he read in the hospital, to be in the band full-time. The members of the band decided to resign from their respective jobs and become professional musicians. Delirious? soon began working on songs for their first full studio album.

== Recording and release ==
After making their first release as Delirious?, a live album titled Live & In the Can, the band set up recording equipment in Beltwood House, London. The album was recorded between 1 December 1996 and 28 January 1997 using an Otari Radar. The album was produced by Andy Piercy, who had previously produced the band's four Cutting Edge EPs. After the release of two singles, the latter of which, "Deeper", stayed in the UK singles charts for three weeks running, the band released the full-length album to the UK market in June 1997. After this, Delirious? took part in an extensive promotional campaign which included playing to 50,000 fans at London's Wembley Stadium, and an appearance on Channel 4's The Big Breakfast programme. The record charted at No. 13 in the UK charts, having held the midweek position of No. 10. It dropped to No. 58 in its second week, before charting at No. 70 in its third week.

In 2007, the band decided to re-release some of their earlier albums as two-disc 'fuse boxes'. One of these albums included King of Fools, which was paired with the 1996 live album, Live & In the Can.

== Singles ==
The album spawned four singles. The band released their very first mainstream single in the UK in February 1997, several months before the release of the album. "White Ribbon Day" was a song inspired by the political situation occurring in Northern Ireland at the time. Distribution problems partly led to the single charting at No. 41, meaning that it narrowly missed out on the UK Top 40 chart show on BBC Radio 1. However, "White Ribbon Day" remained in the top 75 for a second week, charting at No. 75.

In May, the band released "Deeper", their highest-selling single. The song charted at No. 20, and BBC Radio 1 dubbed the band "pop's best-kept secret". "Deeper" remained in the top 40 for a second week, charting at No. 39. It remained in the charts for a third week, charting at No. 65 before dropping out of the charts completely by the end of the month.

The band chose to plan a third single after the June release of the album. In July, "Promise" was released as a two-disc set. This technique, aimed at boosting sales, was frequently used by the band after this. The single entered the charts at No. 20, before dropping to No. 48 in its second week.

During their November UK tour, Delirious? promoted a re-release of "Deeper", which arrived in the form of a four-track EP. The DeEPer EP charted at No. 36 during its first week, before dropping to No. 69 in the second.

Music videos were filmed for "Deeper" and "Promise" to coincide with their respective single releases.

== Reception ==
Professional ratings
Review scores
Source	Rating
christianmusic.org	4/5 stars
Cross Rhythms	(10/10)
HM	(not rated)
Jesus Freak Hideout	4/5 stars
MTV	(Mixed)
The Phantom Tollbooth	4.5/5 stars

King of Fools was positively received by both mainstream and CCM publications. Crosswalk praised the album, stating "...if you're looking for something tame and lacking originality, you're in the wrong place!" Cross Rhythms rated the album as ten out of ten, and argued that it showed the "... versatility of the band." Jesus Freak Hideout called it "...an overlooked but excellent musical achievement." Many critics noticed the U2 influences on the record. MTV noted that "King of Fools has echoes of '80s U2, but the band accentuates the Christian undertones in Bono's lyrics, creating a modern rock record that resonates with spirituality." HM Magazine called the project "the U2 album fans have been waiting for..."

== Tour ==
Delirious? supported the album by launching a ten date tour of the United Kingdom during October and November 1997. Titled the 'd:tour', shows sold out at venues in Folkestone, Leicester, Grimsby, Manchester, London, Leeds, Wolverhampton, Cornwall and Exeter before finishing in front of a packed crowd in Southampton Guildhall, near the band's hometown of Littlehampton. The gigs were advertised every morning by Virgin Radio during their 'gig guide'. The Southampton gig was recorded as a live album, d:tour, and a live video, "A View from the Terraces". Both projects were released in 1998.

== Track listing ==
No.	Title	Writer(s)	Length
1.	"Sanctify"	Stu Garrard, Martin Smith	4:13
2.	"Deeper"	Smith, Garrard	4:20
3.	"Revival Town"	Smith, Garrard	4:49
4.	"All the Way"	Garrard, Smith	4:15
5.	"August 30th"	Smith, Garrard	6:17
6.	"Promise"	Smith	4:14
7.	"King or Cripple"	Smith	4:37
8.	"Hands of Kindness"	Smith	4:45
9.	"White Ribbon Day"	Smith	6:47
10.	"King of Fools"	Garrard, Smith	4:00
11.	"History Maker"	Smith	6:33
12.	"What a Friend I've Found"	Smith	5:49

Note

- The American re-release adds a remix of "Louder than the Radio" between "Hands of Kindness" and "White Ribbon Day".

== Personnel ==
Delirious?

- Martin Smith – lead vocals, guitars
- Stu Garrard – guitars, backing vocals
- Tim Jupp – keyboards, Hammond organ, backing vocals
- Jon Thatcher – bass, backing vocals
- Stew Smith – drums, percussion, backing vocals

Additional personnel

- Mike Roberts – loops and programming (2, 3, 5, 10, 11)
- Mark Edwards – loops and programming (9)
- Gerard Le Feuvre – cello (1, 4, 10–12)
- Paul Kimber – double bass (1, 4, 10–12)
- Sebastian Fenton – viola (1, 4, 10–12)
- Sarah Robson – viola (1, 4, 10–12)
- Nick Evans-Pughe – violin (1, 4, 10–12)
- Jonathan Josephs – violin (1, 4, 10–12)
- Rosalind McIntosh – violin (1, 4, 10–12)
- Delirious? – string arrangements (1, 4, 10–12)
- Richard Swan – string arrangements (1, 4, 10–12), choir arrangements and conductor (3, 9, 12)
- The Tehilla! Choir – backing vocals (3, 9, 12)
- Jussy McLean – backing vocals (5)

Production

- Andy Piercy – producer
- Delirious? – producers, engineers, mixing, album design
- Danny Bowater – assistant engineer
- Paul Burton – assistant engineer, live sound technician
- Mike Roberts – assistant engineer
- Ray Staff – mastering at Whitfield Street Studios. London, UK
- Andy Hutch – photography

== Charts ==
Chart performance for King of Fools
Chart (1997–1998)	Peak position
UK Albums (OCC)	13
US Top Christian Albums (Billboard)	7
US Heatseekers Albums (Billboard)	13
