= It's OK (Delirious? song) =

2000 single by Delirious?

Single by Delirious?

from the album Mezzamorphis
- Released: 21 February 2000
- Recorded: 1999
- Genre: Rock, Christian rock
- Length: 4 m 08 s
- Label: Furious? Records
- Songwriters: Martin Smith; Stuart Garrard
- Producer: Delirious?

Delirious? singles chronology
"See The Star" (1999)	"It's OK" (2000)	"Waiting for the Summer" (2001)

"It's OK" is the second UK single from and the fifth track on Delirious?'s second album, Mezzamorphis. It was released on 21 February 2000, reaching No. 18 in the UK Singles Charts and No. 3 in the indie section. In its second week, it stayed inside the top 75, dropping to No. 63 in the main charts and No. 11 in the indies.

Musically, the song itself is a rock ballad, featuring a brass band from The Salvation Army. Lyrically, it documents the redemptive journey of a girl facing great difficulties. It was met with some criticism within the American-Christian community because of the line "She's as pretty as hell." in addition to references of drinking wine.

The person on the front cover is Dominica Warburton who has made appearances in several TV shows and films. She also played a part in the accompanying music video for the single alongside the rest of Delirious?

== Track listings ==
CD One

1. "It's OK"
2. "Pursuit of Happiness"
3. "Come Like You Promise"
4. "It's OK" (CD-ROM video)

CD Two

1. "It's OK"
2. "Jesus' Blood"
3. "Pursuit of Happiness" (CD-ROM video)

== Charts ==
Weekly chart performance for "It's Okay"
Chart (1997)	Peak position
UK Singles (OCC)	18
UK Indie (OCC)	3
