= CompassionArt (album) =

Studio album by CompassionArt
- Released: 24 November 2008
- Recorded: 2008
- Genre: Modern worship
- Label: Survivor
- Producer: Les Moir

CompassionArt is a studio album by the songwriters' charity of the same name. It features the entire CompassionArt song writing team, Paul Baloche, Chris Tomlin, Tim Hughes, Matt Redman, Darlene Zschech, Israel Houghton, Michael W. Smith, Graham Kendrick, Andy Park, Steven Curtis Chapman, Stu Garrard and charity co-founder Martin Smith, along with several other collaborators. All proceeds from the recording directly benefited charities of the songwriters' choosing.

== Production ==
On 7–11 January 2008, Martin Smith invited the newly formed CompassionArt team, made up of various CCM artists, to Scotland for a writing retreat. During this time the group wrote 22 songs, 14 of which made their way onto the album.

In February 2008, the majority of the album was recorded at Abbey Road studios in London. Martin Smith also travelled to Uganda in order to visit the Watoto Children's Choir and record their contribution to the album. One of the songs which was recorded was "Fill My Cup." This had previously been written by Delirious? as a potential song for inclusion on Kingdom of Comfort, although it was never released.

== Singles ==
In April 2008, "So Great" was released internationally on iTunes as a single. It was also performed live at that year's Dove Awards by Michael W. Smith, Israel Houghton, Paul Baloche, Chris Tomlin and Christy Nockels. The song was also included on the compilation album WOW Hits 1. Also "King of Wonders" was released to Christian radio in November 2008.

== Release ==
The album was released internationally in November 2008, although release was delayed until January 2009 in North America to avoid clashing with new albums from Michael W. Smith and Chris Tomlin. The album also includes a documentary DVD, and was released alongside a book, The Art of Compassion, written by the song writing team.

Some of the songs were available for free download, although a donation was requested.

== Track listing ==
All tracks are written by Paul Baloche, Steven Curtis Chapman, Stu Garrard, Israel Houghton, Tim Hughes, Graham Kendrick, Andy Park, Matt Redman, Martin Smith, Michael W. Smith, Chris Tomlin and Darlene Zschech.

Album release
No.	Title	Performer(s)	Length
1.	"Come to the Water"	Chris Tomlin, Martin Smith, Kirk Franklin and Watoto Children's Choir	4:05
2.	"Shout Praise"	Israel Houghton, tobyMac and Darlene Zschech	3:10
3.	"King of Wonders"	Matt Redman, Tim Hughes and Joel Houston	4:41
4.	"Lead Me to the Rock"	Paul Baloche	4:51
5.	"We Won't Stay Silent"	Tim Hughes and Steven Curtis Chapman	3:13
6.	"Highly Favoured"	Amy Grant, Michael W. Smith and Watoto Children's Choir	4:27
7.	"Fill My Cup"	CeCe Winans and Martin Smith	4:57
8.	"Friend of the Poor"	Leeland Dayton Mooring & Andy Park	5:09
9.	"King of the Broken"	Israel Houghton, Darlene Zschech and Leeland Dayton Mooring	6:04
10.	"You Have Shown Us"	Chris Tomlin, Paul Baloche and Steven Curtis Chapman	4:24
11.	"Until the Day"	Graham Kendrick and Darlene Zschech	3:41
12.	"Let It Glow"	tobyMac & Kirk Franklin	2:15
13.	"So Great"	Michael W. Smith, Israel Houghton, and Christy Nockels	5:18
14.	"There Is Always a Song"	Martin Smith, Steven Curtis Chapman and Watoto Children's Choir	3:40
15.	"There Is Always a Song" (reprise)	Watoto Children's Choir	1:48

== Awards ==
In 2010, the album was nominated for a Dove Award for Special Event Album of the Year at the 41st GMA Dove Awards.
