= White Ribbon Day (song) =

Single by Delirious?

from the album King of Fools
- Released: 1997
- Recorded: 1996
- Genre: Rock, Christian rock
- Label: Furious? Records
- Songwriter: Martin Smith
- Producer: Delirious?

Delirious? singles chronology
"White Ribbon Day" (1997)	"Deeper" (1997)

"White Ribbon Day" is the first single released by rock band Delirious?. It was released from their album King of Fools in 1997, reaching number 41 on the UK Singles Chart.

Lead singer, Martin Smith wrote the song after being inspired by a news report from Northern Ireland that he had seen in early 1996. The report informed about casualties in the area. It mentioned a group of people who had adopted white ribbons as a symbol of hope. The report included the phrase "The people pray for white ribbon day". This line was included in the lyrics of the song.

In light of the events of 11 September 2001, the song was released as a free download on the band's website. Martin Smith remarked that it was "not an attempt to gain popularity in light of the terrible events, but rather a change in the band's short-term plans."

== Track listing ==
1. "White Ribbon Day" (Radio Edit)
2. "White Ribbon Day"
3. "Absolutely Absolute"
4. "White Ribbon Day" (Two Mile Free Fall)

== Charts ==
Weekly chart performance for "White Ribbon Day"
Chart (1997)	Peak position
UK Singles (OCC)	41
