= Andy Piercy =

British singer-songwriter

Andy Piercy is a British singer-songwriter who came to prominence in the gospel beat acoustic duo Ishmael and Andy, together with Ian Smale (Ishmael).

In 1974, Piercy replaced John Leach as guitarist and lead vocalist in After the Fire. He stayed with that group, later taking on bass duties, until they disbanded in 1983.

Subsequently, Piercy was record producer or associate producer for many British acts including T'Pau, Steve Booker and others, and notable Christian musicians and bands, including Delirious? (their original Cutting Edge recordings and the album King of Fools), Matt Redman and Split Level.

== Discography ==
with Ishmael (Ian Smale) and Andy

- Ready Salted (1973)

with After the Fire

- Signs of Change (1978)
- Laser Love (1979)
- 80-f (1980)
- Batteries Not Included (1982)
- Der Kommissar (1982)

with Dave Clifton

- Praise God from Whom All Blessings Flow (1994)
- Psalms, Hymns & Spiritual Songs (1996)
