= Live & In the Can =

Live album by Delirious?
- Released: 1 December 1996
- Genres: Rock, Christian rock
- Length: 61:48
- Label: Furious?
- Producer: Delirious?

Delirious? chronology
Cutting Edge 3 and Fore (1995)	Live & In the Can (1996)	King of Fools (1997)

Alternative Covers
- 2007 UK Compilation Release alongside King of Fools (1997)

Professional ratings
Review scores
Source	Rating
AllMusic	2/5 stars
HM Magazine	
The Phantom Tollbooth	2.5/5 stars

Live & In the Can was the first live album released by Delirious? in 1996, and was packaged in a tin can. It was re-released in 2012 as part of the band's 20th Anniversary Cutting Edge Years boxed set.

== Track listing ==
1. "Spontaneous I" – 1:06
2. "I'm Not Ashamed" – 6:35
3. "Did You Feel The Mountains Tremble?" – 5:25
4. "Spontaneous II" – 3:17
5. "Oh Lead Me" – 3:41
6. "Obsession" – 9:04
7. "Spontaneous III" – 2:02
8. "Spontaneous IV" – 2:08
9. "Come Like You Promise" – 3:22
10. "Spontaneous V" – 2:30
11. "Spontaneous VI" – 3:36
12. "What A Friend I've Found" – 5:05
13. "Spontaneous VII" – 1:37
14. "I've Found Jesus" – 5:09
15. "Spontaneous VIII" – 3:20
16. "Lord's Prayer" – 1:32
17. "Spontaneous IX" – 2:19

The "spontaneous" sections are live improvisation, prayers, or extended introductions to the other tracks. Much of the recordings took place at the Cutting Edge events in Littlehampton and Central Hall, Southampton as well as at the Remix conference in Birmingham. Those heard praying in the Spontaneous sections include Roger Ellis, Billy Kennedy, Pete Greig, Roger Mitchell and Johnny Sertin.
