= Farewell Show: Live in London =

Farewell Show

Live album by Delirious?
- Released: 19 April 2010
- Recorded: 29 November 2009
- Genre: Rock, Christian Rock
- Label: Sparrow, Furious?
- Producer: Delirious?

Delirious? chronology
History Makers (2009)	Farewell Show (2010)

Professional ratings
Review scores
Source	Rating
Christian Music Zine	(A)

Farewell Show - Live In London is the sixth and final live album by the band Delirious?. In November 2009, Delirious? attended the Hammersmith Apollo in London to record their final gig as a live concert album, DVD and Blu-ray in front of a sold-out crowd of 5,000. They concluded their "History Makers - Farewell Tour" with this performance, wrapping up a series of 11 concerts across Germany, Austria, Switzerland, The Netherlands, and the UK. The album was released on 19 April 2010.

== Track listing ==
Disc 1

1. "All This Time"
2. "Bliss"
3. "Solid Rock"
4. "Sanctify"
5. "Obsession"
6. "Rain Down"
7. "Deeper"
8. "Paint the Town Red"
9. "Inside Outside"
10. "Majesty"
11. "Our God Reigns"
12. "Investigate"
13. "History Maker"
14. "My Soul Sings"

Disc 2: Cutting Edge Show

1. "I'm Not Ashamed"
2. "Happy Song"
3. "Shout To the North"
4. "Thank You for Saving Me" / "White Ribbon Day"
5. "I Could Sing of Your Love Forever"
6. "Find Me In the River"
7. "Did You Feel the Mountains Tremble" / "Dance In the River"
