= Deeper (Delirious? song) =

Single by Delirious?

from the album King of Fools
- Released: 1997
- Genre: Rock, Christian rock
- Length: 3:35 (radio edit), 4:20 (album version)
- Label: Furious? Records
- Songwriters: Martin Smith, Stuart Garrard
- Producer: Andy Piercy

Delirious? singles chronology
"White Ribbon Day" (1997)	"Deeper" (1997)	"Promise" (1997)

"DeEPer EP"

Single by Delirious?

from the album King of Fools
- Released: 1997
- Genre: Rock, Christian rock
- Length: 3:35 (radio edit), 4:20 (album version)
- Label: Furious? Records
- Songwriters: Martin Smith, Stuart Garrard
- Producer: Andy Piercy

Delirious? singles chronology
"Promise" (1997)	"DeEPer EP" (1997)	"See The Star" (1999)

"Deeper" is the second single from Delirious?'s debut album, King of Fools, on which it is the second track. It is one of the band's most famous songs and, along with "History Maker", almost universally represented King of Fools in live set lists until 2005. It remains the band's best-selling single (although not their highest chart position).

== Single release ==
It was first released as a single on 5 May 1997. Rather surprisingly, given its minimal mainstream airplay, it reached No. 20 on the UK Singles Charts in the week of its release, dropping to No. 39 in the second week. In total, it sold over 30,000 copies.

=== Music video ===
The music video for the single features the band on top of a building and performing the track. The camera rotates around them as they perform. The shots are also slowed down and sped up at different points of the song.

=== Track listing ===
1. "Deeper" (radio edit)
2. "Deeper"
3. "Louder Than the Radio" (Mark Edwards Remix)
4. "Come Like You Promise" (Live)

== DeEPer EP re-release ==
The single was also released on 3 November 1997 as an EP, titled the "DeEPer EP". Once more, the single performed relatively well, reaching No. 36 in its first week. This was the first (and, to date, only) time the same recording of the same song by the same artist had been released twice in the same year with both releases reaching the top 40.

=== Re-release track listing ===
1. "Deeper" (radio edit)
2. "Summer of Love"
3. "Touch"
4. "Sanctify" (Video: Live from Wembley)

== Charts ==
Weekly chart performance for "Deeper"
Chart (1997)	Peak position
UK Singles (OCC)	20
UK Indie (OCC)	3
US Christian AC Airplay (CCM)	8
US Christian CHR (CCM)	1
US Christian Rock (CCM)	21
