= Deeper (Delirious? album) =

Compilation album by Delirious?
- Released: 9 October 2001
- Genre: Rock, Christian Rock
- Length: 133:56
- Label: Furious?
- Producer: Andy Piercy, Tedd Tjornhom and Delirious?

Delirious? chronology
Audio Lessonover? (2000)	Deeper (2001)	Libertad (2001)

Professional ratings
Review scores
Source	Rating
Jesus Freak Hideout	3.5/5 stars
The Phantom Tollbooth	5/5 stars

Deeper: The D:finitive Worship Experience is a double compilation album by the band Delirious?.

== Track listing ==
=== Disc one ===
1. "Did You Feel the Mountains Tremble? (New Version)" - 9:01
2. "I Could Sing of Your Love Forever (New Version)" - 5:29
3. "I've Found Jesus" - 4:54
4. "I'm Not Ashamed" - 6:44
5. "Deeper" - 4:19
6. "Lord, You Have My Heart (New Version)" - 6:24
7. "Sanctify" - 4:13
8. "Not Forgotten (New Song)" - 5:32
9. "Shout to the North" - 4:14
10. "History Maker" - 6:37
11. "Follow" - 4:40
12. "All the Way" - 4:17
13. "Kiss Your Feet" - 4:20

=== Disc two ===
1. "The Happy Song (New Version)" - 4:30
2. "Come Like You Promise" (New Version) - 3:58
3. "Revival Town (New Version)" - 5:55
4. "Hands of Kindness" - 4:44
5. "Find Me in the River" - 5:08
6. "Jesus' Blood" - 5:32
7. "King of Love" - 2:47
8. "Message of the Cross" - 4:46
9. "Oh Lead Me" - 4:50
10. "Obsession" - 8:33
11. "Thank You for Saving Me" 7:01
12. "What a Friend I've Found" - 5:28

== Release history ==
Region	Date
United States	9 October 2001
United Kingdom	7 January 2002

== Charts ==
Weekly chart performance for Deeper: The D:finitive Worship Experience
Chart (2001)	Peak position
US Top Christian Albums (Billboard)	27
US Heatseekers Albums (Billboard)	31
