= Martin Smith (English musician) =

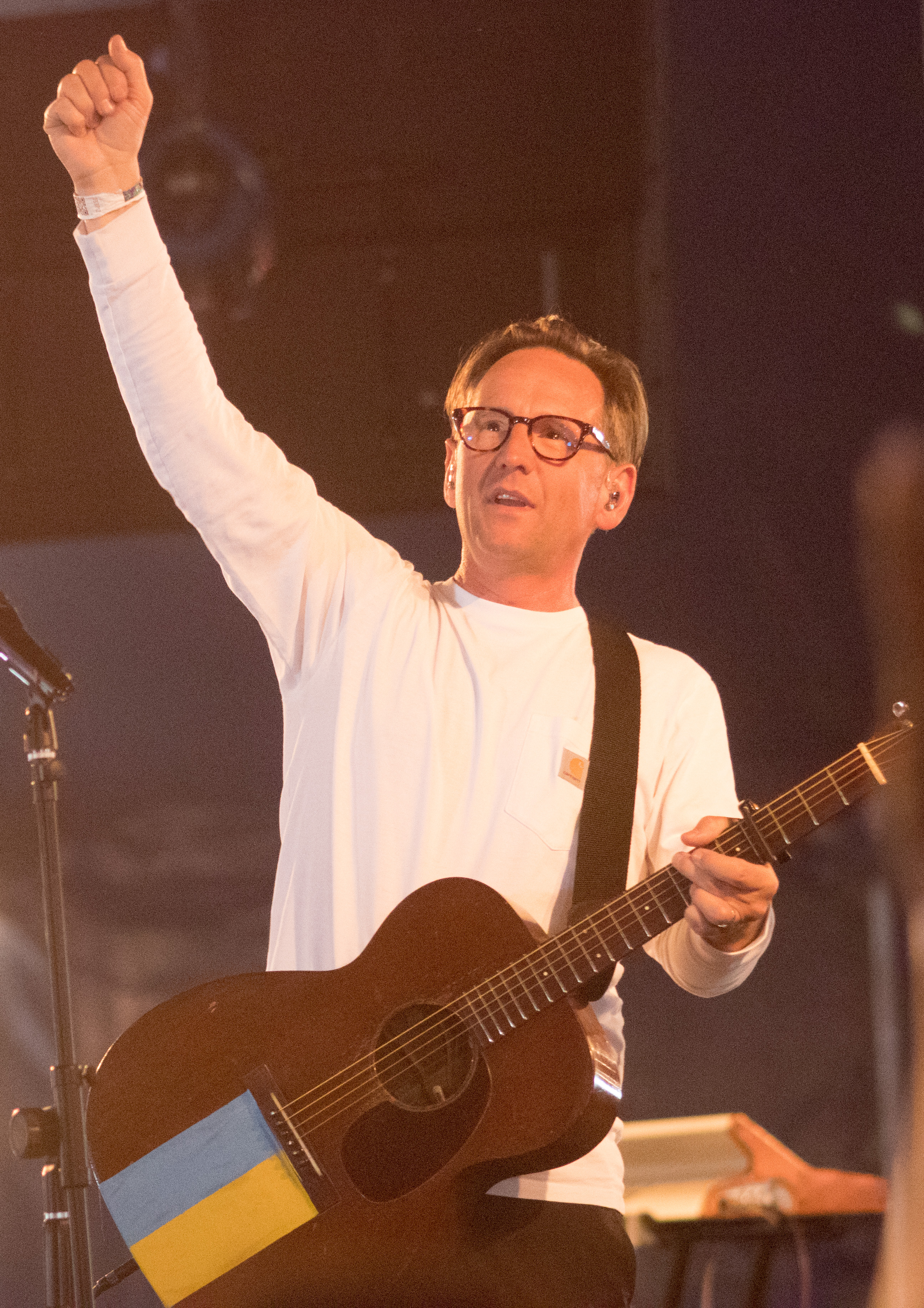
- Martin Smith performing at the Big Church Festival at Wiston, West Sussex in 2022

Background information
- Born: Martin Smith; 6 July 1970 (age 56)
- Origin: Littlehampton, West Sussex, England
- Genres: Christian rock; alternative rock; contemporary worship music
- Occupations: Musician; songwriter; producer
- Instruments: Guitar; vocals
- Years active: 1992–present
- Labels: Furious?; Survivor; Sparrow; Virgin
- Formerly of: Delirious?
- Website: martinsmith.tv

Martin James Smith (born 6 July 1970) is an English vocalist, guitarist, songwriter, and producer, best known as the frontman of the Christian rock and worship band Delirious?. He has been a solo artist since Delirious?' disbandment in 2009.

== Career ==
Before becoming a full-time musician, Smith was a sound engineer at ICC studios in Eastbourne. In 1992, Smith—along with Stewart Smith (no relation) and Tim Jupp—formed The Cutting Edge Band (Delirious?' former name).

In 1995, Smith and his wife were involved in a near-fatal car accident, and during the weeks of his recovery, he decided to become a professional musician. This inspired him to write the song "August 30". In 1996, the band—now known as Delirious?—became a full-time endeavour, producing songs such as "I Could Sing of Your Love Forever", "History Maker", and "Did You Feel the Mountains Tremble?". In 2009, the band announced a break at the end of the year to focus on things close to them. Smith said that he wanted to spend time with his family and devote more time to the CompassionArt project, headed by himself and his wife. Delirious? released a various artists album in January 2009, with Smith appearing on three tracks, and the group later confirmed that they were disbanding permanently after a final concert in November 2009.

In 2012 and 2013, Smith independently released four EPs, titled God's Great Dance Floor: Movements One through Four. The title track was co-written with Chris Tomlin. In 2013, he released his first full albums God's Great Dance Floor Step 01 and God's Great Dance Floor Step 02, each containing the songs from the four EPs, plus new tracks.

Smith has also collaborated with the other members of Delirious? on the 2007 book I Could Sing of Your Love Forever: Stories, Reflections and Devotions. In 2011, he released his autobiography, Delirious: The Autobiography of Martin Smith.

== Personal life ==
Smith has been married to Anna since 1994, and is part of St. Peter’s Church in Brighton, England. She is sister to Delirious?' former bass player Jon Thatcher. Martin and Anna have six children. Their daughter Elle Limebear is a worship singer.

== Discography ==
As a solo artist

- 1998 – The People's Album (various artists album) – two songs "Now" & "Draw Me Near"
- 1999 – The People's Album 2 (various artists album) – one song "True Surrender"
- 2002 – Your Love Broke Through (various artists album) – one song
- 2012 – God's Great Dance Floor Movement One (EP)
- 2012 – God's Great Dance Floor Movement Two (EP)
- 2012 – God's Great Dance Floor Movement Three (EP)
- 2013 – God's Great Dance Floor Movement Four (EP)
- 2013 – God's Great Dance Floor – Step 01 (Album comprising Movement One & Two EPs plus two new songs)
- 2013 – God's Great Dance Floor – Step 02 (Album comprising Movement Three & Four EPs, plus three new songs)
- 2014 – Back to the Start (compilation album of songs from the God's Great Dance Floor releases)
- 2018 – Love Song for a City: Live Worship from Around the Globe released 23 July 2018
- 2019 – Iron Lung released 10 May 2019, Integrity
- 2020 – Exalt released 6 March 2020, Integrity
- 2022 - Dancing in the Fire released 4 February 2022, Gloworks

With Delirious?

- 1993 – Cutting Edge 1
- 1994 – Cutting Edge 2
- 1995 – Cutting Edge 3: Red Tape
- 1995 – Cutting Edge Fore
- 1996 – Live & In the Can
- 1997 – King of Fools
- 1998 – d:tour
- 1999 – Mezzamorphis
- 2000 – Glo
- 2000 – Roaring Lambs (various artists album) – one song "Touch"
- 2001 – Audio Lessonover?
- 2002 – Deeper
- 2002 – Libertad
- 2002 – Touch
- 2002 – Access:d
- 2003 – World Service
- 2004 – In the Name of Love: Artists United for Africa (various artists album) – one song
- 2005 – The Mission Bell
- 2005 - Music Inspired by The Chronicles of Narnia: The Lion, the Witch, and the Wardrobe (various artists album) - one song
- 2006 – Now Is the Time – Live at Willow Creek
- 2008 – Kingdom of Comfort
- 2009 – My Soul Sings
- 2010 – Farewell Show – Live in London

With Delirious? and Amy Grant

- 1999 – Streams (various artists album) – one song "Find Me In The River"

With Delirious? and Hillsong

- 2004 – UP: Unified Praise CD/DVD

With Delirious? and André Valadão

- 2008 – Unidos

With Stu Garrard

- 1995 – Have You Heard?
- 2017 - Beatitudes one song "Holy Troublemakers"

With Matt Redman

- 1998 – Intimacy – 1 song
- 2007 – Beautiful News – 1 song

With Graham Kendrick

- 2001 – What Grace – 1 song "Lord You've Been Good To Me"

With Darlene Zschech

- 2003 – Kiss of Heaven – 1 song

With Michael W. Smith

- 2004 – Healing Rain – wrote 3 songs

With Taylor Sorenson

- 2004 – Exodus (various artists album) – 1 song

With Jars of Clay

- 2005 – Redemption Songs – 1 song

With Tim Hughes

- 2006 – Holding Nothing Back co-wrote 2 songs
- 2011 – Love Shine Through co-wrote 9 songs

With CompassionArt

- 2009 – CompassionArt (various artists album) – 3 songs (1 song with Chris Tomlin, Kirk Franklin, Watoto Children's Choir / 1 song "Fill My Cup" with CeCe Winans, Lakewood Choir / 1 song "There Is Always A Song" with Steven Curtis Chapman, Watoto Children's Choir)

With Israel Houghton

- 2009 – The Power of One – 1 song

With Parachute Band

- 2011 – Love Without Measure – 1 song (featured artist on "It's You")

With Jesus Culture

- 2012 – Live from New York

With LZ7

- 2016 – Home – 1 song (featured artist on "Stolen Voices")

With Army of Bones

- 2017 – Army of Bones (album)

Don’t Be Long (5:47) Dead In the Water (3:33) Break Away (4:12) End of Time (3:18) Love Song For a City (4:03) Do You Love Me? (5:43) Ecclesiastes (3:58) Batteries (4:05) River (3:02) The Day the Fire Went Out (6:01)

- 2021 - Stay - Single

With Held By Trees

- 2024 – Lay Your Troubles Down - EP
