= Delirious? =

English contemporary Christian band

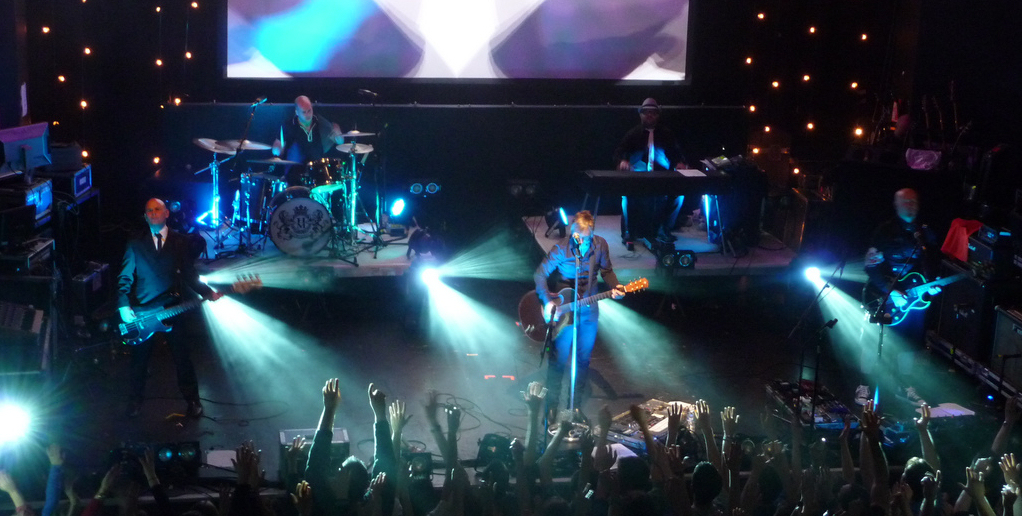
- Delirious? in Edinburgh, November 2009. Members (L-R): Jon Thatcher, Paul Evans, Martin Smith, Tim Jupp, Stu G.

Background information
- Also known as: The Cutting Edge Band
- Origin: Littlehampton, West Sussex, England
- Genres: CCM; contemporary worship music; Christian rock
- Years active: 1992–2009
- Labels: Furious?; Survivor; Sparrow; Virgin
- Past members: Martin Smith; Stu G Tim Jupp; Jon Thatcher; Stew Smith; Paul Evans

Delirious? (formerly known as The Cutting Edge Band) were an English contemporary Christian band. For the majority of their career, the lineup featured Martin Smith on vocals and guitar, Stu G (full name Stuart Garrard) on guitar and backing vocals, Jon Thatcher on bass guitar, Tim Jupp on keys and piano, and Stew Smith on drums and percussion. Paul Evans took over as drummer for the band's final two years.

Delirious?' 1994 song "I Could Sing of Your Love Forever" has been called a "modern worship classic". Other well-known songs by the band include "Did You Feel the Mountains Tremble?", "Rain Down", and "Majesty".

The Cutting Edge Band had various members from 1992 to 1996, before becoming a full-time band with an established lineup and renaming themselves to Delirious?. From 1997 to 2001, the band focused on a mainstream audience, with several singles reaching the top-twenty in the UK. The band shifted towards CCM from 2003 to 2009, although occasional singles were still released.

During their final years, Delirious? began to focus on humanitarian issues in their music, and Martin Smith and Stu G started charities. Drummer Stew Smith left the band at the end of April 2008, and in a press release in July that same year, it was announced that the band would embark on an indefinite and possibly permanent hiatus. Delirious? performed their final concert in November 2009.

== History ==
=== Origins: The Cutting Edge Band (1992–1996) ===
The origins of Delirious? stretch back to 1992. The band began life as a collection of musicians, known as The Cutting Edge Band, to be a Christian worship band for a youth outreach event called "Cutting Edge", instigated by the Arun Community Church in Littlehampton, West Sussex. The first members were Tim Jupp and Martin Smith, who became friends while working together at a recording studio. There they decided to form a band. Jupp had previously released an instrumental album titled "Hooked On Ishmael". Originally, Jupp fronted the band, which also contained youth worker and drummer Stew Smith. Several different musicians filled the role of guitarist and bass player. The events became popular via word-of-mouth, leading the band to play at other 'Cutting Edge' events along the south coast of England – monthly events in Portsmouth and Southampton. The events in Portsmouth only lasted a year but the events in Central Hall, Southampton were to run for three years, the duration of the Cutting Edge events. The group remained as the house band for Cutting Edge for several years, and they began to record and release the 'Cutting Edge' cassette tapes.

"Martin was this really shy, almost withdrawn character. I can remember times actually, this will make people laugh, when I was the one. I would end up leading the worship in the meetings."

— Tim Jupp, on the early days of 'The Cutting Edge Band'

The turnout at the events grew so much that the regular venue (a local school hall) had to be replaced with the school's sports hall, whilst the organizers had to charge a small fee to control the numbers attending. Similar challenges took place at the Central Hall in Southampton where up to 1200 people would gather each month. In 1996, an event was held in the open air, on the green next to Littlehampton's beach. An estimated 4000 people attended, while Channel 4 filmed it for a documentary.

The band were able to release their increasingly popular material thanks to lead singer Martin Smith and keyboardist Tim Jupp's roles as recording engineers and producers at a local recording studio. During this period, the lineup of the band began to take shape. Permanent guitar duties were taken up by Stu G shortly after the release of the band's first EP, whilst Jon Thatcher became permanent bassist for the band's fourth release, 'Cutting Edge Fore'. In total, four EPs were released under the "Cutting Edge" name, in addition to a solo EP from guitarist Stu Garrard, which featured the entire band. Many of the band's most famous songs were written and recorded during this time, including possibly their most famous: 'I Could Sing Of Your Love Forever.' Others included 'The Happy Song', 'Lord, You Have My Heart', 'Thank You For Saving Me', 'Did You Feel The Mountains Tremble?', 'I've Found Jesus', 'I'm Not Ashamed', 'Find Me In The River', 'Shout To The North', 'All I Want Is You' and 'Obsession'. The music became well known in Christian circles, and demand grew for recordings. By 1996, they had sold over seventy thousand EPs by mail order. These EPs were later released as two albums in the UK, and one double album in the US. A similar composite edition of Cutting Edge was released to retail and achieved 'Gold' status in Canada.

=== Taking the band full-time: King of Fools & early success (1997–1998) ===
The turning point came in 1995 when Martin, his wife Anna and Jon Thatcher, were involved in a serious road accident. Jon and Anna were unhurt, but Martin was hospitalized for several weeks with broken bones. While in the hospital, Smith went through a period of depression, before making the decision to become a full-time musician. At this point, Delirious? was conceptually born. The band changed its name in January 1996, and they began to start work recording their new album.

They gained unexpected mainstream success in 1997 following the release of King of Fools, the first studio album released under their new name. King of Fools eventually went 'Silver' in the United Kingdom, and Delirious? became one of the most popular and well-known Christian rock groups both in the UK and the United States. Songs such as "Deeper" gained anthemic status and still surface regularly at Christian youth events. Delirious? also released four singles to the mainstream UK Charts – "White Ribbon Day", "Deeper" (twice), and "Promise". 'Deeper' and 'Promise' both reached number twenty with very little radio airplay; For the majority of their career, "Deeper" was the band's best-selling single with over thirty thousand copies sold. The album also contained the song "History Maker", which arguably became one of the band's most popular anthems. The song was played regularly at gigs throughout the rest of the band's existence, and was eventually released as a successful UK single in 2010. During the summer of 1997, Stewart Smith and his wife lost their unborn baby through a miscarriage, inspiring the song "Summer of Love" on the "DeEPer EP", a re-release of the "Deeper" single. The re-release attained number thirty-six on the UK Charts.

The group signed to EMI for its British releases but in 1997 the group signed to both Virgin and Sparrow Records for distribution in secular and Christian markets in the United States.

The success of the King of Fools album allowed the band to tour the UK for the first time comprehensively in 1997's 'd:tour'. Delirious? chose to tour without a support band, instead using a DJ and a large visual aspect to the performance. In 1998, the band released their second live album, d:tour, which featured many of the songs from the King Of Fools album in addition to some songs from the Cutting Edge period. It was recorded at Southampton Guildhall on the final night of the 'd:tour'.

=== First mainstream push: Mezzamorphis & Glo (1999–2000) ===
After a brief hiatus, the 1999 album Mezzamorphis attained number 25 in the UK mainstream album charts (number two in the independent section), and soon became certified silver in the UK. During this time, the band found resistance in the mainstream due to their "Christian" label, despite widespread critical acclaim in the music press. However, the work was aimed at a "secular" audience, causing many former fans to shun the album and claiming that Delirious? had "sold out" to mainstream markets.

"...there are differing opinions regarding whether this was the right choice or not."

— Stu G, on the decision to release See The Star

Several singles from Mezzamorphis gained some British chart success. For example, the first single, "See The Star", peaked at number sixteen on the charts (a career high for the band), following an appearance on television show The Big Breakfast. Despite the success of the single, the song choice was slightly controversial as it was arguably one of the weaker songs on the record.

The second single, "It's OK", subsequently reached number eighteen. In the US, "Gravity" was chosen over "See the Star" as lead radio single for promotion.

Exactly one year later, in 2000, the band released Glo (short for glorious). This album was the number one seller for eight months. Several songs from the album, while not being released as actual singles, gained immense popularity in the Christian-music world, most notably the guitar-driven "My Glorious" and the more introspective "Jesus' Blood". The track "Investigate" eventually became a favourite concert closer for the band. That year, Delirious? toured the US and appeared to an audience of 55,000 at the Creation Festival.

=== Second mainstream push: Audio Lessonover? (2001–2002) ===
The second attempted mainstream album, Audio Lessonover? (an anagram of 'Radio One Loves Us') was released in 2001. The band hired well known music producer Chuck Zwicky (Semisonic, Madonna). Zwicky wanted to go with a more stripped-down sound than the sonically layered Mezzamorphis and Glo. The band noted that there were tense and strained moments during the Audio Lessonover recording sessions, but in the end it stretched them as musicians and as a band. The first single "Waiting For The Summer" reached number twenty-six on the charts, hindered by limited radio airplay. This led to a planned second single, "Take Me Away", being cancelled. Critically, the record itself received less favourable reviews in comparison to their previous three albums, whilst commercial album sales were also lower.

"I think it's a good album. I'm glad we made that record. I think after Mezzamorphis it was probably another step further that people weren't expecting but I think that's what good bands do."

— Jon Thatcher, on the reaction to Audio Lessonover?

Again they received criticism for "selling out" to achieve success in mainstream markets. The band members are often questioned about the apparent critical 'failure' of the album in interviews to this day.

That year the group took part in major tours with Bon Jovi and Matchbox Twenty.

The band's first compilation, Deeper, was released in early 2002. It was a double album, consisting of many remastered classic songs from the band, in addition to tracks taken from previous work such as Glo and King of Fools. It also included several new versions of popular Cutting Edge tracks and a new song, "Not Forgotten". Later that year, Audio Lessonover? was significantly edited by the band, and restyled as Touch. This new version of the album was intended for the North American market, although it was also made available in the UK. Some editions of Touch included a second disc featuring several live tracks, although these recordings were later incorporated into the band's subsequent live album. Access:D was released towards the end of 2002, capping a year which had seen four full album releases from the band. A two-disc set, it featured many tracks which had previously been seen on their studio albums King of Fools, Mezzamorphis, Glo, Audio Lessonover? and Touch. A special edition was made available in an exclusive tin case.

=== Return to roots: Post mainstream 'trilogy' (2003–early 2008) ===
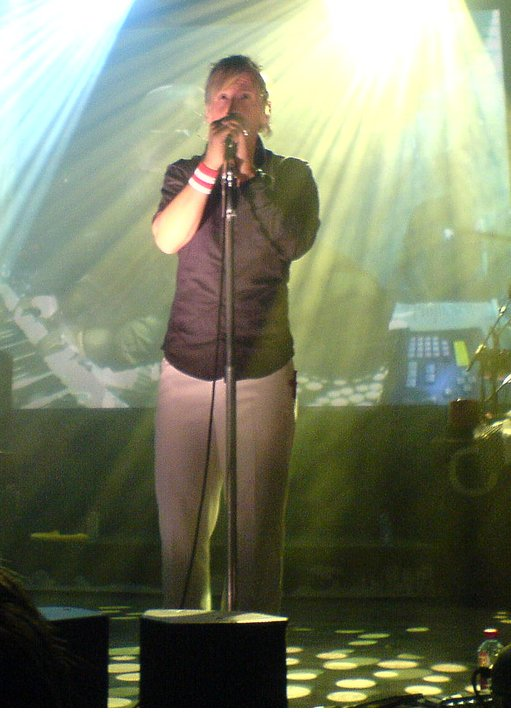
Frontman Martin Smith performing in 2006

In 2003, Delirious? released World Service, the first of what guitarist Stu G later described as 'a trilogy'. Although this was more of a worship-oriented album, Delirious? released two singles to the German market: "Inside Outside" and "Every Little Thing". The former sold over twelve thousand copies, was number one in German radio station SWR3's chart, and spent seven weeks in the German singles charts peaking at number seventy-two. Delirious? also released two free MP3 downloads on mp3.com, both topping the Guitar Rock charts (the first for a full month). The first MP3, "Majesty (Here I Am)", hit number fifteen on the worldwide charts; the second, "Rain Down", reached number twenty-eight. The two together had amassed over 500,000 listens/downloads after fifty days. Delirious?’s World Service is finding success in the United Kingdom and America as well. The band’s American single 'Rain Down' has become its biggest multi-format hit since "Deeper".

In 2005, long-term manager Tony Patoto parted company with the band, stating that he wanted a fresh challenge. The role was filled by band member and Delirious? keyboard player Tim Jupp.

The band's sixth studio album, The Mission Bell was released in the UK in 2005. The album received very positive reviews, with Christianity Today, Jesus Freak Hideout, and Cross Rhythms all praising The Mission Bell for "Effectively stretching the boundaries of music". "Paint The Town Red" was released as a CD and iTunes single in the UK, entering the charts at number fifty-six. Several singles were released to CrossRhythms radio in the UK, all charting at number one for several weeks. The Mission Bell was nominated for the May 2007 Dove Awards, in the Rock/Contemporary Album of the Year Category.

Delirious? spent much of 2007 recording and working on their new album Kingdom of Comfort with producer Sam Gibson. It was released internationally in April 2008. This strategically coincided with the launch of the third version of their official website. The first single from the album was God Is Smiling.

=== Retirement (mid-2008–2009) ===
"I have found the touring an increasing pressure on both me and my family. We function better as a complete unit than when we are separated for so many months of the year, and I wish to be at home, to be around and be far more local."

— Stew Smith, on his reasons for leaving the band.

Prior to the release of Kingdom of Comfort, long-time drummer Stew Smith announced that he would be leaving the band in April 2008. He made his final appearance on a recording during the production of a live album and DVD while on tour in Brazil. The album was titled Unidos, and served as a collaboration project with André Valadão. It has been released in several countries, although it remains unreleased in the UK. Stew Smith's final performance with the band took place at Sydney, Australia. His departure had a great impact upon the other members of the band, who came close to breaking up. However, Smith insisted that they should carry on. Paul Evans became the new drummer for Delirious? in May. He had previously played with Delirious? before when Stew Smith was unable to perform during a tour of the US.

On 6 July of the same year, the band announced via a press release that they would be "taking a break" at the end of 2009 to allow the band to focus on things close to them. Martin said that he wanted more time to spend with his family and devote more time to the CompassionArt project.

However, the band later announced that they would release the second single from Kingdom of Comfort to the UK charts in November, "Love Will Find A Way", which was featured on Kingdom of Comfort. The single entered the charts at number thirty, but had dropped to number fifty five by the end of the first week.

Another live album and DVD, My Soul Sings, was recorded in Colombia during that year, and released in 2009. Additionally, a Greatest Hits album, History Makers, was released in November.

Delirious? finished their career by conducting a small farewell tour of Europe which concluded at the end of 2009. They played their final show in front of a sell-out crowd at London's Hammersmith Apollo on 29 November 2009, including a cameo performance from Stew Smith alongside Paul Evans.

=== Post retirement (2010–present) ===
The three-and-a-half-hour final show was filmed for a live album, DVD and Blu-ray package, titled Farewell Show - Live In London. It was released in April 2010.

In February 2010, a campaign to get History Maker into the UK charts for Easter began on social networking site Facebook. In response to this, the version from the final live album was released as a single on 28 March 2010. The two versions of "History Makers" reached as high as numbers 3 and 21 on the iTunes Store during the week, and the combined sales placed the single at number 6 in the midweek charts of 31 March 2010. The single rose two places, to chart at number four in the Official Singles chart on 4 April 2010. It also reached number one in the UK Indie Singles Chart.

Away from the band, many of the members have started work on, or announced, future projects that they intended to pursue after the band ended in November 2009. Lead singer Martin Smith intends pursuing the Compassionart project, the decision that triggered the split. Smith has written an autobiography titled 'Delirious', providing a detailed account of his life and time with the band. It was released in February 2011, alongside a similar autobiography from his wife Anna, which provides an alternative perspective on the band's history. Smith has also been writing songs and leading worship at conferences around the world. A new website, launched to coincide with the autobiography, hints at future plans to 'record' and 'tour'.

"Seventeen absolutely fantastic years, and we're still great friends. What a testimony it's been. The chance of us all getting together and playing again is very high. Now it's time to take a rest."

— Martin Smith, on the potential for a reunion.

Keyboard player Tim Jupp has been involved with a series of one-day Christian music festivals based mainly in West Sussex, England, called The Big Church Day Out Festival. Delirious? headlined the first annual event in May 2009. Another expanded event, held across three days, was held in May 2010.

Guitarist Stu G and bassist Jon Thatcher formed a new band with Jason Ingram as lead singer and Paul Mabury as drummer early in 2009. The band is called 'One Sonic Society', and they started work on their debut record in June 2009. As a group of four, the band released two EP's. The first, 'One', was released in June 2010, whilst the second, 'Sonic', was released in October 2010. Following the release of 'Sonic', all references to Jon Thatcher were removed from the band website and official press releases, and it was confirmed by a source close to the band that Thatcher was no longer a member and that the band were now officially a three-piece. There have been no official comments on Thatcher's departure from any of the band members, although the split is thought to have been an amicable one. As of March 2011, One Sonic Society have been recording 'Society', the third and final EP in the trilogy. A live album compiling the songs from the EP has also been planned.

Stu G also began writing and recording with many other artists around the world, and has continued to be a member of the Compassionart writing team. He has also toured extensively with other artists, most recently with Amy Grant and Michael W. Smith in 2011.

Thatcher has launched a creative solutions project called 'Arkyard'. The services of the organisation have been since used by several notable clients including David Byrne, in addition to Delirious?, One Sonic Society and producer Sam Gibson.

Former drummer Stew Smith has already launched his graphic design company, 'Smeezer', which has designed advertising campaigns for Premier Percussion, clothing lines for high street store Fat Face, and the marketing of 'The Big Church Day Out' festival.

However, in spite of all of these new projects, Martin Smith has hinted that the band may reunite some day.

In 2025, Martin Smith and Stu G. reunited to perform at the Big Church Festival in West Sussex despite press releases calling it a Delirious? Reunion even though all members weren't present at that time.

In October 2026 the social media profile pictures of Delirious? were changed into a black background photo with a white question mark, posts of the profile change were captioned with a link that took people to a countdown clock that is slated to end on Wednesday October 7, at 10:00 AM. Due to this Fans began predicting a possible reunion tour, a re-release of their 'King of Fools' album or the release of remastered early recordings or anything related to the band. More posts followed with the same theme which had different symbols but in collaboration with specific members notably a lightning bolt which was with Stu G. and three upward Chevrons with Martin Smith it is unsure of what happens when the countdown ends at zero. Then another symbol was posted and that symbol was one with a crown and this time it had both Smith and Stu G. in collaboration. The moment the Countdown ended it was received with disappointment, shock, and joy as it was an event featuring Martin Smith and Stu G. having one intimate night with fans sharing stories and singing songs from Delirious?'s debut "King of Fools" that is slated to begin on November 14, in Nashville.

== Naming confusion ==
The question mark is part of the official name. On the band's early albums, the final s before the question mark was rendered as a 5.

== Delirious? live ==
During their career, Delirious? played in over forty countries around the world. In the United Kingdom, they played gigs at venues such as Wembley Stadium, Hyde Park and the o2 Arena in London, Hampden Park stadium in Glasgow, Millennium Stadium in Cardiff, Milton Keynes Bowl, Birmingham's NEC Arena in addition to a performance on the main stage at Glastonbury Festival in 1999. They frequently headlined festivals such as Greenbelt, and conducted many tours around the country. They supported Bon Jovi, Matchbox 20 and Bryan Adams on their UK tours in 2001 and 2002. Prior to the band's retirement, they played what were intended to be the first of many intimate 'Living Room' gigs, exclusively for fans. The first of these was at the London Embassy in Mayfair, and limited to only one hundred tickets. The band were supported by Huey of the Fun Lovin' Criminals.

Delirious? also played many major shows in mainland Europe. In 2004, they headlined the Olympic celebrations in Omonia Square, Athens. In 2005, the band performed to an audience of 1.2 million people in Cologne, Germany.

The band also had an extensive touring schedule outside of Europe. In 2006, they played again to 1.2 million people, this time during a four date tour of India, with up to 400,000 people attending in one day. In the US, they played at such events as Acquire the Fire (an event hosted by Teen Mania) and Spirit West Coast. In 2007, they headlined their own twenty-four date tour across the country. In New Zealand they made appearances at the Parachute Music Festival, a four-day Christian music festival, the largest in the southern hemisphere.

=== Tours ===
Delirious? have performed many UK tours throughout their career, in addition to many high-profile tours of the US, Europe and other parts of the world. The full list of UK tours can be found below:

Date	Tour	Shows	Support
1997	d:tour	10	none
1998	May '98 Tour	6	Blueberry
1999	PreMorphis Tour	9	Blueberry
1999	Mezzamorphis Tour	9	Switchfoot
1999	PostMorphis Tour	6	Aqualung
2000	Glo Tour	5	Steve
2001	One Wild Night Tour	5	supporting Bon Jovi
2001	d:tension Tour	18	Kendall Payne
2002	Fire Tour	9	All Star United
2004	January 2004 Tour	5	Superhero
2004	World Service Tour	14	Rock N Roll Worship Circus/Taylor Sorenson
2005	Paint The Town Tour	7	Kendall Payne
2006	The Mission Bell Tour	13	Tim Hughes/Reuben Morgan
2007	Omnisonic Tour	11	Electralyte
2008	Kingdom of Comfort Tour	12	Tree63
2009	History Makers Tour	6	Themselves as "The Cutting Edge Band"

- These are only the UK tours, as Delirious? have played hundreds of shows around the globe.

During the d:tour in 1997, Delirious? travelled without a support act. During the History Makers tour in 2009, they supported themselves by playing a short set as 'The Cutting Edge Band' before returning to the stage to perform as 'Delirious?'. 'The Cutting Edge Band' played the songs found on the four Cutting Edge tapes.

== Members ==
=== Delirious? ===
- Martin Smith – lead vocals, rhythm guitar (1992–2009)
- Tim Jupp – keyboards (1992–2009)
- Stu G – lead guitar, backing vocals (1994–2009)
- Jon Thatcher – bass guitar (1995–2009)
- Stew Smith – drums, percussion, backing vocals (1992–2008)
- Paul Evans – drums, percussion (2008–2009)

=== The Cutting Edge Band ===
During the 'Cutting Edge' era, several other musicians played and recorded as part of the band before Stu Garrard and Jon Thatcher joined, including:

- Dave Clifton – lead guitar (1993)
- Jim Bryan – bass guitar (1993)
- Les Driscoll – bass guitar (1994)
- Helen Burgess – bass guitar, backing vocals (1994–1995)
- Dudley Phillips – bass guitar (1995)

== Discography ==
- King of Fools (1997)
- Mezzamorphis (1999)
- Glo (2000)
- Audio Lessonover?/Touch (2001/2002)
- World Service (2003)
- The Mission Bell (2005)
- Kingdom of Comfort (2008)
