= Stu G =

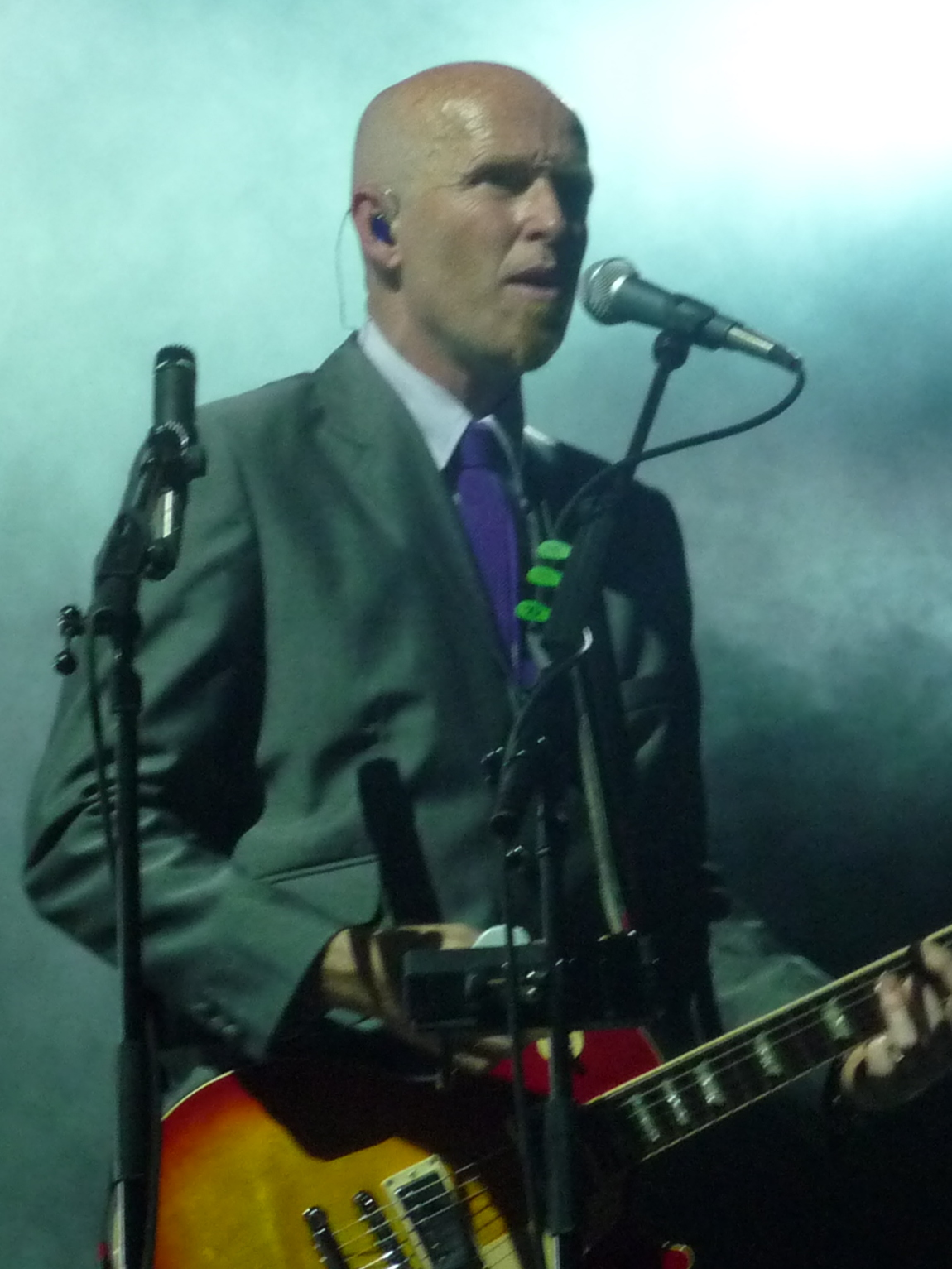
- Garrard in 2008

Background information
- Born: Stuart David Garrard; 6 July 1963 (age 62)
- Genres: Alternative rock, acoustic, Christian rock
- Occupations: Musician, songwriter
- Instruments: Guitar, vocals
- Label: Furious?
- Formerly of: Delirious?, Treasure Park, One Sonic Society

Stuart David Garrard (born 6 July 1963) better known by his stage name Stu G, is an English vocalist, guitarist, and songwriter. He was one third of US-based Christian contemporary music band One Sonic Society, and is writing and recording as a solo artist.

He served as the lead guitarist, backing vocalist, and secondary songwriter for the rock band Delirious? from 1994 until 2009. His song writing credits for the band include "Come Like You Promise", "Metamorphis", and "Pursuit of Happiness". His most famous work is probably "Majesty (Here I Am)" (written with Delirious? lead singer Martin Smith). Stu G has also produced his own solo material, and released his first album in 1995. He is also a member of the songwriter's charity CompassionArt.

In a documentary coinciding with the Delirious? live DVD Now is the Time, Martin Smith claimed of Stu G that he "can't think of many guitarists that are better than him".

== Biography ==
=== Early career 1994–1996 ===
Stu G joined Delirious? (then known as The Cutting Edge Band) in 1994. Prior to this, he had worked as an electrician, played session guitar for other artists, and played with the band Treasure Park. During his time with the Cutting Edge Band, he wrote and recorded his first and, to date, only solo project. The album, titled Have You Heard?, was released in 1995 on a limited cassette run. It has not been re-released since.

=== Delirious? 1996–2009 ===
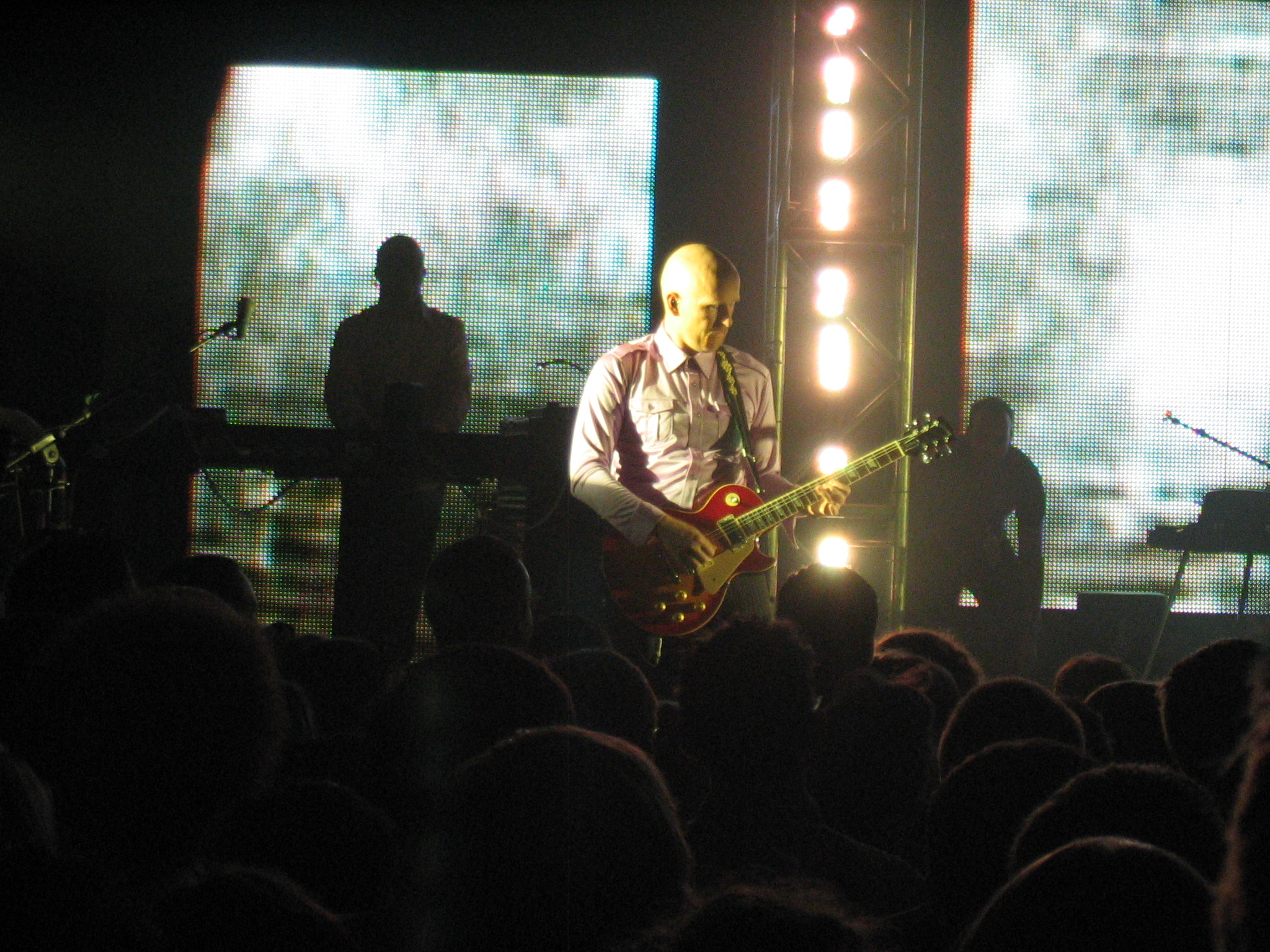
StuG with Delirious? at The Vine, Dunfermline, 22 October 2004

In 1996, Delirious? became a full-time band. During the writing sessions for their first album King of Fools, Stu G was the primary songwriter for the title track and the song 'All The Way', both of which he wrote with Martin Smith. He also served as the secondary songwriter on many other tracks on the album, including the bands international hit single "Deeper". Later in the year, the band embarked upon their first full UK tour. During this time, the band regularly played 'Come Like You Promise', the opening track from his 1995 solo album.

Stu G wrote many popular songs for the band throughout the rest of their career. For their third album Glo, the band recorded 'Awaken The Dawn', a track which he had written in 1994 during his time as a solo recording artist. He shared lead vocals with Smith in 2001 on the Audio Lessonover? track 'Fire', something he later repeated on their European hit single 'Inside Outside' in 2003. In 2007, he wrote his first book, 'I Could Sing Of Your Love Forever', with Martin Smith, chronicling their times during the band.

In 2008, he joined the CompassionArt songwriters team, contributing towards their first self-titled album and book.

=== Post Delirious? ===
When Delirious? announced their planned split in 2008, Stu G was quick to reassure fans through his blog that he would be continuing in the music industry, and later hinted that he would work on projects with bassist Jon Thatcher. Thatcher confirmed that he had built his own studio and that he was frequently traveling to Nashville.

He was part of Tim Hughes' live band during the recording of his live album, Happy Day.

Stu G performed his first solo acoustic gig during the Greenbelt Festival in 2009.

Stu G and Jon Thatcher have now formed a new band with Jason Ingram as lead singer and Paul Mabury as drummer. The band, called One Sonic Society, started work on their debut album in June 2009. Two of the songs on their EP One are also featured on the Hillsong LIVE album A Beautiful Exchange.

In 2013, Stu G crowdfunded a solo EP titled Of Burdens, Birds and Stars through PledgeMusic.

== Discography ==
- 1995 - Have You Heard?
- 2013 - Of Burdens, Birds and Stars (EP)
- 2017 - Beatitudes

with Delirious?

with CompassionArt

- 2008 - CompassionArt

== Bibliography ==
2007 - I Could Sing Of Your Love Forever - with Martin Smith
2008 - The Art Of Compassion - with CompassionArt

== Personal life ==
Until drummer Stew Smith was replaced by Paul Evans in 2008, Stu G was the only member of Delirious? who was unrelated to the others; Jon Thatcher was related to the other three members by marriage (each of his three sisters married another Delirious? member). He is married to Karen and they have two daughters.

== Have You Heard? ==
Professional ratings
Review scores
Source	Rating
Cross Rhythms	7/10 stars

Have You Heard? was recorded and released by Furious? Records in 1995. It features many members of Delirious? as guest musicians, whilst the lead singer of the band, Martin Smith, served as producer. It received a fairly positive review from Cross Rhythms. "Like You Promise" was later restyled as "Come Like You Promise", and released on the band's 1996 live album Live & In the Can, 1998 live album d:tour, 2001 single "It's OK", and 2002 compilation album Deeper. "Absolutely Absolute" was also released as a b-side to the band's 1997 single "White Ribbon Day".

=== Track listing ===
1. "Like You Promise"
2. "The Rain"
3. "Wilderness"
4. "Have You Heard?"
5. "Rest"
6. "Absolutely Absolute"

== Of Burdens, Birds and Stars ==
Professional ratings
Review scores
Source	Rating
Louder Than The Music	4/5 stars

Of Burdens, Birds and Stars was released in 2013 following a crowdfunding campaign on PledgeMusic. Stu G describes its tracks as "therapy songs" which were "written in the last 4 years or so in my time of transition and figuring out what's next now that delirious? has ended."

=== Track listing ===
1. Long Way Down
2. Don't Really Know Me
3. Eyes
4. Carry My Burdens
5. King Of The Stars
6. Little Bird

== Have You Heard? 2015 edition ==
In August 2015, Stu G announced that he was working on a remastered version of Have You Heard" to be released later in 2015.
