= Parachute Music Festival Compilation CDs =

Parachute Music Festival Compilation Albums
- Origin: Mystery Creek, Hamilton, New Zealand
- Years active: 20
- Labels: Parachute Music Ltd.

Parachute Music Festival has been going since 1991, and have made compilation CDs since 1997, comprising mostly songs written by artists that perform at the festival. The CDs are not for sale but are distributed to the first 7500 people who bought tickets to the festival. From 2008 Parachute organisers have stopped producing the CDs, instead moving in favour of downloadable media posted on their website.

== Discography ==
=== 1997 ===
Track	Song title	Artist
1	Bliss	MIC
2	Best Thing	The Wades
3	Let's Play Dress Up	Blue Train
4	Song For Richard	The Lads
5	I Can Hear You	Carolyn Arends
6	Don't Give It Up	Dave Grace
7	I See The Lord	Christian City Church Oxford Falls
8	And That My Soul Knows Very Well	Hills Christian Life Centre
9	I Never Will Be	Karen Beckett
10	You Alone	Parachute Band
11	Remember	Gold Coast Youth Alive
12	MC In The House	South Australia Youth Alive
13	10,000	Gump
14	Salvation	NSW Youth Alive
15	Sounds Of Heaven	Kathy Troccoli

=== 1998 ===
Track	Song title	Artist
1	La La Land	All Star United
2	Creator Of All	CCC Auckland
3	Superhuman	MIC
4	The Cactus Song	The Lads
5	Nasty McFly	Blue Train
6	Deep Calling Deep	Margaret Becker
7	I Know It	Hillsong
8	Always And Forever	Parachute Band
9	Wing Of The Wind	Glenn Kaiser
10	Seaside	Brotherhood Lush
11	Enlightenment Cake	Krusty
12	Saviour Of The Universe	All Star United

=== 1999 ===
Track	Song title	Artist
1	Deeper	Delirious?
2	If We Were Lovers	All Star United
3	Even If	Brotherhood Lush
4	Cast The First Stone	Steve Apirana
5	I Fall Down	Parachute Band
6	Depend On Me	Ma-V-Elle
7	Real Thing	DNA Algorithm
8	Rain	JC Culture
9	The Astronaut Song	The Lads
10	Alone	Krusty
11	Translator	Furthermore,
12	Dillusion	The Flying Groovies

=== 2000 ===
Track	Song title	Artist
1	Gravity	Delirious?
2	Amazing	Solace
3	Better Off	Pete Stewart
4	Getcha	Parachute Band
5	Yuppyland	MIC
6	Don't Be So Shy	Ma-V-Elle
7	Under The Blood	Invasion Band
8	The Mercy Bell	Alabaster Box
9	Stay	A Cat Called Africa
10	Karanga	Chris Mason-Battley Group
11	Billy G	The Elusive Tones Of Wonder
12	The Vibe	Receiver
13	Wish	Battered Fish
14	Straight	Kumquats

=== 2001 ===
Track	Song title	Artist	Album
1	One Time	Earthsuit	Kaleidoscope Superior
2	Good Stuff	Newsboys	Love Liberty Disco
3	Hands And Feet	Audio Adrenaline	Underdog
4	Who I Am	Third Day	Conspiracy #5
5	Watching Over You	Phil Joel	Watching Over You
6	Amazing	Raze	The Plan
7	All My Life	Parachute Band	Love
8	Media Slaves	Sy Rogers	Sy Communicate
9	Radio	Spacedoctrine	Which Way Is Up?
10	Hoolio	Royal Rumble	This Are Rumbletones
11	China Store	Soda	Concrete
12	Alone	Pugface	Ernie’s World
13	Higher	Elevator	Music

=== 2002 ===
Track	Song title	Artist	Album
1	What It Comes To	The OC Supertones	Loud and Clear
2	God's Romance	Delirious?	Glo
3	Creator	The Lads	Marvel
4	God Squad	The Tribe	Take Back The Beat
5	Amazing	Parachute Band	Amazing
6	In Wonder	Earthsuit	Kaleidoscope Superior
7	Lord, I Come Before You	Salvador	Salvador
8	Who Do You Love?	The Katinas	Destiny
9	Follow	Form	unknown (TBA at time of pressing)
10	Turn (live)	Paul Colman Trio	Live:Electric
11	One Real Thing	Skillet	Alien Youth
12	Shine Down	Soda	Concrete
13	Steal	Elevator	Music
14	When I Survey	Chris Mason-Battley Group	Unspoken

=== 2003 ===
Track	Song title	Artist	Album
1	Get This Party Started	tobyMac	Momentum
2	Different Now	Out Of Eden	This Is Your Life
3	So Bright (Stand Up)	Superchic(k)	Last One Picked
4	Echelon	Pillar	Fireproof
5	She Walked In	Detour	Detour
6	No Words	Tree63	The Life and Times of Absolute Truth
7	All The Earth	Parachute Band	Amazing
8	Angels	Solace	Send And Transmit
9	Almost King	Felt	Colour Of The Sky
10	Cannibalism	The Lads	Marvel
11	Miles From Your Door	The Jive Express	Cutting Deeper
12	Radiate	Andy Hunter	Exodus
13	Ooh Aah	Grits featuring tobyMac	The Art of Translation
14	Show Me Your Glory	Third Day	Come Together
15	Great Light Of The World	Bebo Norman	Myself When I Am Real

=== 2004 ===
Track	Song title	Artist	Album
1	Fireproof	Pillar	Fireproof
2	He Reigns	Newsboys	Adoration: The Worship Album
3	Almighty	Parachute Band	Glorious
4	Free	Hillsong United	To the Ends of the Earth
5	Chapstick, Chapped Lips And Things Like Chemistry	Relient K	Two Lefts Don't Make a Right...but Three Do
6	Only You Can Make Me Happy	The Tribe	Take Back The Beat
7	Hiding Place	Christafari	Gravity
8	When You Call	Detour180	Detour180
9	Promise	Darlene Zschech	Kiss of Heaven
10	Send And Transmit	Solace	Send And Transmit
11	Hell Nah	Rapture Ruckus	Rapture Ruckus
12	Solution	Paul Colman Trio	One
13	In Wonder (demo)	Magnify	Unreleased (later to be released on debut album In Wonder)
14	Stars	Superhero	Superhero
15	Majesty	Delirious?	World Service

=== 2005 ===
Track	Song title	Artist	Album
1	Til The Day I Die	Third Day	Wire
2	Miracle	Audio Adrenaline	Worldwide
3	Hittin’ Curves	Grits	Dichotomy A
4	Gravity	Shawn McDonald	Simply Nothing
5	Blown Away	Magnify	In Wonder
6	One Way	Hillsong United	More Than Life
7	Bless The Lord	Jeff Deyo	Light
8	Detainer	Day of Fire	Day of Fire
9	Enough (Frait Train) (demo)	Rapture Ruckus	Unreleased (later to be released on I Believe)
10	Fools (demo)	Brian Platt	Unreleased (later to be released on Eleven Steps)
11	The Wedding Song	Mumsdollar	Eastern Time
12	Everybody	Iron & Clay	Iron + Clay
13	Love On The Radio	Alabaster Box	Love On The Radio
14	This Is For You	Da' T.R.U.T.H	Moment Of Truth
15	Everything About You	Sanctus Real	Fight the Tide
16	God Is Love	Tonéx & The Peculiar People	Out The Box

=== 2006 ===
Track	Song title	Artist	Album
1	Paperthin Hymn	Anberlin	Never Take Friendship Personal
2	Fade Away	Day of Fire	Day of Fire
3	Now Is The Time	Delirious?	The Mission Bell
4	World Through Your Eyes	Reuben Morgan	World Through Your Eyes
5	Tin Cars	Juliagrace	Juliagrace
6	Shout	Parachute Band	All The Earth
7	Fill me (demo)	Magnify	Unreleased (later to be released on Alive Within)
8	In Light Of This	Form	Construct
9	What About You	Mozelee	Mozelee EP
10	Sorry When You're Smiling	The Valley	A Small Misunderstanding Leads To Disaster
11	Absolute	Thousand Foot Krutch	The Art of Breaking
12	Let Creation Sing	Hillsong	God He Reigns
13	Better Days	Robbie Seay Band	Better Days
14	Say Goodbye	Joy Williams	Genesis

=== 2007 ===
Track	Song title	Artist	Album
1	Move	Thousand Foot Krutch	The Art of Breaking
2	Tunnel	Third Day	Wherever You Are
3	The One Thing I Have Left	Hawk Nelson	Smile, It's the End of the World
4	God Help Me	Rebecca St. James	If I Had One Chance To Tell You Something
5	Free	Shawn McDonald	Ripen
6	Call On His Name	Darlene Zschech	Change Your World
7	Sunshine Day	Spacifix	Much Love
8	I Believe	Rapture Ruckus	I Believe
9	Hey Sister	Katy Ray	Dreaming For Something More
10	Life Of Mine	The Lads	The Lads
11	Moonlit	Falling Up	Dawn Escapes
12	Let Me Go	Mumsdollar	A Beautiful Life
13	Tonight	My Life Story	The Night Is Young EP
14	Beautiful One	Juliagrace	Juliagrace
15	Back To The Cross	Detour 180	Fighting For You
16	Solid Rock	Delirious?	Now Is The Time
17	The Time Has Come	Hillsong United	United We Stand
18	Sweetly Broken	Jeremy Riddle	Full Attention
19	Guns In The Distance	Vera Cruz	Emancipation Day

=== 2010 ===
In 2010 free worship compilation CDs were available with a purchase from the Manna store. They were available for the 20th Parachute Music birthday celebrations.
