= Hold On (Rapture Ruckus EP) =

EP by Rapture Ruckus
- Released: 8 June 2010
- Genre: Hip Hop/Rock
- Label: Parachute
- Producer: Joe Baldridge, Brad Dring

Rapture Ruckus chronology
Rapture Ruckus Live at World's End (2008)	Hold On (2010)	Open Your Eyes (2011)

Hold On is an EP released on 8 June 2010 through Parachute by the New Zealand Hip Hop/ Rock band Rapture Ruckus. The Album is a New Zealand release of the debut EP Rapture Ruckus which is being released through Tooth & Nail records.

A pre release of the EP was made available on 29 January 2010 at the Parachute Music Festival 640 copies were printed and all sold in the first 24 hours of the festival. The EP charted at No. 7 on the NZ Top 40 albums chart and No. 1 on the NZ Independent albums chart.

== Release and promotion ==
At Parachute 2009, the band unveiled two of the songs from the EP, "Catch me Riding" and "Hold On" they also added "All Things New" to their setlist on the Parachute Roadshow which toured New Zealand in September and October 2009 with Juliagrace and Parachute Band.

On 16 January they added the lead single "Tonight" to their Myspace page. The single was also released to Christian Radio in New Zealand. It also charted at No. 1 on the NZ Myspace charts. Then in 2011 they performed live at Easterfest.

== Track listing ==
No.	Title	Length
1.	"All We Got"	4:06
2.	"Tonight"	3:14
3.	"Hold On"	4:01
4.	"All Things New"	3:56
5.	"Catch Me Ridin"	3:18
6.	"No Matter What"	3:19
