= This Generation =

This Generation may refer to:

- This Generation (Sonicflood album), 2005, or the title song
- This Generation (Murs and Fashawn album), 2012, or the title song
- This Generation, a 2013 album by The Lions
- "This Generation", a song by Roachford from the 1994 album Permanent Shade of Blue
- "This Generation", a song by The Friends of Distinction, B-side of "Love or Let Me Be Lonely", 1970

== See also ==
- My Generation (disambiguation)
