= Arbor Day (disambiguation) =

Arbor Day (UK: Arbour Day) can refer to:

- Arbor Day, a holiday in which individuals and groups are encouraged to plant and care for trees
- Arbor Day Foundation, the world's oldest tree-planting organization
- Arbor Day (album), a 1996 album by The Lads
- Arbor Day (film), a 1936 Our Gang short
- It's Arbor Day, Charlie Brown, a prime-time animated TV special
- Arbor Day, an episode of the Japanese-American animated TV series Hi Hi Puffy AmiYumi
- Oak Apple Day, a holiday in the United Kingdom to celebrate the restoration of the Monarchy.
