= Technicolor (disambiguation) =

Technicolor is a color film process. Technicolour (BrE) or Technicolor (AmE) may also refer to:

== Music ==
- Technicolour (Disco Inferno album), 1996
- Technicolor (Marlango album)
- Technicolor (Parachute Band album), 2008
- Technicolor (Covet album), 2020
- Tecnicolor, a 1970 album by Brazilian band Os Mutantes
- Technicolour (band), a musical group from Finland
- "Technicolour" (song), song by Australian singer Montaigne
- "Technicolour", song by English singer Paloma Faith included on the single "Upside Down"
- "Technicolor", song by French DJ/producer Madeon included on the album "Adventure"

== Other ==
- Technicolor Group, formerly Technicolor Creative Studios, a multinational corporation
- Technicolor (physics), theories of physics beyond the Standard Model of particle physics, modeled after the quantum chromodynamics quantum field theory
- Vantiva, the technology company formerly known as Technicolor SA, when Technicolor Creative Studios was spun off

== See also ==
- Technicolor for Industrial Films, a 1949 sponsored film about how Technicolor can be used in industrial films
- Technicolor Specials (Warner Bros. series), Hollywood color film shorts of the 1930s and 1940s
