= Shuree =

- Also known as: Shuree Rivera
- Born: Shuree Danyell Lee Jennings; June 21, 1978 (age 47)
- Origin: Columbus, Ohio, Chicago, Illinois
- Genres: Contemporary Christian music, electropop, pop rock
- Occupation(s): Singer, songwriter
- Instrument: Vocals
- Years active: 2004–present
- Labels: BEC
- Website: shureemusic.com

Shuree Rivera (born June 21, 1978, as Shuree Danyell Lee Jennings), who goes by the stage name Shuree, is an American Christian musician. Her first extended play released by a label, Be the Change, was released in 2014 by BEC Recordings. The song, "Be the Change", charted on the Billboard magazine Christian Airplay chart. She was featured on Invader Volume 1, with the song, "In This Together", and this charted on the Billboard magazine Christian AC/CHR chart alongside the Christian Airplay chart.

== Early life ==
Shuree was born as Shuree Danyell Lee Jennings, on June 21, 1978, She was raised in a broken home environment as a child. She faced the death of her sister to a fatal drug overdose, at 21 years old, while growing up in Columbus, Ohio. Her pathway out of this environment was to go away to college at Nyack College, located in Nyack, New York. Where she would obtain her degree in music business, and where she found her calling to minister to other young people. After college, she would relocate to Chicago, Illinois to further her ministry at Willow Creek Church. Her mother and father would eventually get their lives on track, and coming to reconciliation with each other.

== Music career ==
Her music recording career commenced in 2004, with the independently release album, Author of My Life. She would eventually sign with BEC Recordings, where they would release her first extended play, Be the Change, and it was released on November 4, 2014. The single, "Be the Change", charted on the Billboard magazine Christian Airplay chart at No. 45. She was featured on the Rapture Ruckus extended play, Invader Volume 1, with the song "In This Together", and this charted on the aforementioned chart at No. 48, while it placed at peak of No. 11 on the Christian AC/CHR songs chart.

== Personal life ==
She is married to her husband, Paul Rivera, and together they had ministered at The Compass Church, located in Naperville, Illinois, just right outside Chicago, where the couple resides. The couple were married on July 22, 2006, in Columbus, Ohio.

== Discography ==
EPs

- Be the Change (November 4, 2014, BEC)
