= Rapture Ruckus (EP) =

Rapture Ruckus Live at World's End

EP by Rapture Ruckus
- Released: June 8, 2010
- Genre: Hip hop; Rock
- Label: BEC Recordings
- Producer: Joe Baldridge; Brad Dring

Rapture Ruckus chronology
Rapture Ruckus Live at World's End (2008)	Rapture Ruckus Live at World's End (2010)	Open Your Eyes (2011)

Rapture Ruckus is the debut EP by New Zealand Christian hip hop/rock group Rapture Ruckus, released through Tooth & Nail Records on June 8, 2010. It is a US release of the EP, Hold On, which was released in New Zealand on the same day through Parachute Records containing a slightly different track listing.

== Track listing ==
Rapture Ruckus
No.	Title	Length
1.	"No Matter What"	3:19
2.	"Tonight"	3:14
3.	"Hold On"	4:01
4.	"All Things New"	3:56
5.	"I Believe"	3:37
6.	"All We Got"	4:06

== Awards ==
The album was nominated for a Dove Award for Rap/Hip-Hop Album of the Year at the 42nd GMA Dove Awards.
