= I Believe (Rapture Ruckus album) =

Studio album by Rapture Ruckus
- Released: 30 Nov 2006
- Genre: Hip hop/rock
- Length: 39.41 Minutes
- Label: Parachute Records

Rapture Ruckus chronology
| Rapture Ruckus (2002) | I Believe (2006) | Rapture Ruckus Live at World's End (2008) |

I Believe is the second studio album of the Christian hip hop/Christian Rock band, Rapture Ruckus, from Wellington New Zealand. Released through Parachute Records, the album won the 2006 Gospel/Christian Album of the Year at the New Zealand Music Awards. The single "Lose Control" charted at #7 on the NZ iTunes video charts.

== History ==
Following the success of Rapture Ruckus's first album, the self-titled Rapture Ruckus in 2001, the band was signed by Parachute Records in 2004. In late 2005, they started recording I Believe in a studio in Wellington New Zealand. Midway during the production of the album, a limited edition EP was released at the 2006 Parachute Music Festival. The EP helped build anticipation of I Believe, and the album was released on November 30, 2006. The first single, also titled "I Believe," gained some national airplay but did not chart. "Freight Train" and "Lose Control" were also released as singles.

The album went on to become the best selling Christian Album in New Zealand for the next six months and won the Band the 2006 Gospel/Christian Album of the Year at the New Zealand Music Awards.

== Track listing ==
- "Intro" - 1:34
- "Got This Feelin'" - 3:35
- "Rockin'" - 3:11
- "Rhymes For Times" - 4:36
- "Lose Control" - 4:32
- "I Believe" - 3:37
- "Move" - 3:58
- "Freight Train" - 4:09
- "Forever" - 1:54
- "Get Ready" - 3:13
- "Thank You" - 5:17
