= I Could Sing of Your Love Forever =

Song by Delirious?

Song by Delirious?

from the album Cutting Edge 2
- Recorded: 1994 (Cutting Edge Version); 2001 (Deeper Version)
- Genre: Worship, Christian rock, Contemporary Christian
- Length: 6:09 (Cutting Edge Album Version); 5:29 (Deeper Album Version)
- Label: Furious?
- Songwriter: Martin Smith
- Producers: Andy Piercy, Delirious?

"I Could Sing of Your Love Forever" is a popular Christian rock and worship song by the English contemporary Christian band Delirious?. The song's popularity has reached far beyond the band's; CCLI places the song among the 30 most-sung worship songs in the United States and has been called a "modern worship classic". According to Martin Smith, the author of the song:

"That song just wrote itself in about five minutes. The same chords the whole way through the song. I mean that's embarrassing really! It was just a little ditty. Did it at church. It was good but I don't think it really blew anybody away. It wasn't like, 'Oh Martin's written the most amazing song!' I still don't really think it is. But yes, that song, that moment changed our lives really. It's been one of the most sung songs in America and around the world. It's crazy really, this little ditty that we don't really do anymore. It's been great."

Delirious? have released it several times in different forms. It was first recorded as the last track on Cutting Edge 2; in this incarnation, it was a six-minute soft pop song featuring extensive use of eBow and choir. Later, it was re-recorded for Deeper, the band's "d:finitive worship collection"; here, it became a full-blown rock ballad with gospel influences. A radio edit of this version was released as a single (see Single Release, below). A Spanish version of the original, translated as "Cantaré de Tu amor por siempre", appeared on the band's album Libertad.

== Covers ==
The song has been covered numerous times, with variations in style and performance, particularly within the CCM genre. The most popular of these covers (most notably within the US) was by worship group Sonicflood. The song, which appears on their self-titled debut album, is a duet with Lisa Kimmey from R&B outfit Out of Eden. Switchfoot has also sung this song during various concerts. Christian singer tobyMac has also covered part of this song live after his hit, Lose My Soul. It has also been covered by Christian/Rock band, The Lads, in their Alive in Concert album in 2003. Canadian pop singer Justin Bieber covered this song on a live feed on his Instagram on 16 May 2017.

== Single releases ==
"I Could Sing of Your Love Forever"

Single by Delirious?

from the album Deeper
- Released: 2001
- Genre: Worship, rock, Christian rock
- Length: 3:34 (Radio Edit); 5:29 (Album Version)
- Label: Furious?
- Songwriter: Martin Smith

Delirious? singles chronology
"Waiting for the Summer" (2001)	"I Could Sing of Your Love Forever" (2001)	"Inside Outside" (2004)

Alternative covers
- CD2 Single

The single version of the song was released to the UK Singles Charts on 10 December 2001. As with most previous Delirious? singles, the song received no airplay on Radio One, the UK's largest pop station. It reached No. 37 in the midweek charts and hit an official peak of No. 40 on 17 December, making it the band's seventh Top 40 hit in a row.

=== Track listing ===
CD1

1. "I Could Sing of Your Love Forever" (Radio Edit) — 3:34
2. "Everything" (Live USA Radio Session) — 5:40
3. "Bliss" (Britrix Re:Mix) — 3:10
4. "I Could Sing Of Your Love Forever" (CD-ROM Video)

CD2

1. "I Could Sing of Your Love Forever" (Full Version) — 5:31
2. "American President" — 3:36
3. Every Child Counts — HopeHIV (CD-ROM Video)

== Charts ==
Weekly chart performance for "I Could Sing of Your Love Forever"
Chart (2001)	Peak position
UK Singles (OCC)	40
