= Glimpse =

Glimpse or Glimpses may refer to:

- Glimpse: Live Recordings from Around the World, an album by Sonicflood
- The Glimpse, an album by Robert Mitchell
- Glimpse EP, an album by Trapt
- Glimpse (software), a photo editor forked from GIMP

GLIMPSE may refer to:

- The Galactic Legacy Infrared Mid-Plane Survey Extraordinaire, an astronomical survey performed by the Spitzer Space Telescope
- a knowledge-based front-end for the statistical software package GLIM

Glimpses may refer to:

- Glimpses: A Collection of Nightrunner Short Stories, 2010 book by Lynn Flewelling
- Glimpses, 1993 book by Lewis Shiner
