= Rapture Ruckus Live at World's End =

Studio album by Rapture Ruckus
- Released: 8 December 2008
- Recorded: Parachute Music Festival 2008
- Genre: Hip Hop/Rock
- Length: 40.36
- Label: Parachute

Rapture Ruckus chronology
I Believe (2006)	Rapture Ruckus Live at World's End (2008)	Hold On (2010)

Live at World's End is the third album of the New Zealand Christian Hip Hop/ Rock band Rapture Ruckus. Released on 8 December 2008 the album it made a debut in the NZ Top 40 at #7 and #16 on the IMNZ independent chart. The album was a Live CD/ DVD of their performance at the Parachute Music festival in Hamilton, New Zealand in the January 2008 in front of a crowd of some 25,000 people. The album had two new songs "One" and "No Matter What." Brad Dring later referred to the Show as;

"It was definitely one of if not the best show I've ever had the privilege of being part of"

The DVD also features interviews with Brad Dring and other Ruckus Members as well as the Parachute record CEO. The band attempted to break the record for the most albums sold at the Parachute Musical festival ever in January 2009 with Live at Worlds End, a record they last broke in 2002. It is unknown if they succeeded.

== Reception ==
The album was the well received with strong sales in CD stores around the country and at the Parachute music festival, the album became the first Rapture Ruckus Album to chart after a large number of Albums were sold both online and at the Parachute music festival.

"Whether you’ve experienced the phenomenon of Rapture Ruckus live or you need a power-packed introduction, Live at World's End shows the hip-hop dynamo at his mindblowing best." Parachute records says on its website "with this release he has lifted his game once again."

== Track listing ==
1. "Intro" – 1:04
2. "Freight Train" – 2:27
3. "Got This Feelin" – 3:32
4. "Rhymes For Times"- 4:32
5. "One" – 2:45
6. "Rockin" – 4:54
7. "I Believe" – 3:14
8. "Thank You" – 4:04
9. "No Matter What" – 4:44
10. "Lose Control" – 6:10
11. "One (Bonus Track, Studio version)" – 3:10

== Credits ==
- Director: Brad Dring
- Post-Production Director: Kim Boyce-Campbell
- Editor: Raymond Kenard
- Behind the Scenes Footage: Kim Boyce-Campbell, Mel Dring, Simon Faisandier, Geoff Reid
- Audio Mix: Brad Dring
- Mastered By: Mike Gibson

== Live band ==
- Vocals- Brad Dring
- Drums- Gio Lesa
- Guitars- Geoff Duncan
- DJ- Soane Tonga
