= Parachute Records =

Parachute Records may refer to:

- Parachute Records, Christian record label subsidiary of Parachute Music
- Parachute Records, subsidiary of Casablanca Records (1976-1979)
- Parachute Records (Eugene Chadbourne), label founded by Eugene Chadbourne in 1975
