= Sonicflood (album) =

Studio album by Sonicflood
- Released: February 23, 1999
- Studio: The Border and The Playground (Franklin, Tennessee)
- Genre: Contemporary worship music, Christian rock
- Length: 55:10
- Label: Gotee
- Producer: Sonicflood; Otto Price; Bryan Lenox

Sonicflood chronology
Sonicflood (1999)	Sonicpraise (2001)

Zilch chronology
Platinum (1997)	Sonicflood (1999)

Professional ratings
Review scores
Source	Rating
AllMusic	3/5 stars
Church Musician Today	not rated
Youthworker Journal	not rated

Sonicflood is the debut album by the Christian rock band Sonicflood, released in 1999. The album features modern pop and rock renditions of praise and worship songs. Musically, the release was likened to a combination of Third Eye Blind and Radiohead, or PFR.

== Track listing ==
No.	Title	Writer(s)	Length
1.	"Invocation"		0:20
2.	"I Have Come to Worship"	Jeff Searles	3:16
3.	"Holy One"	Jeff Deyo, Otto Price, Jason Halbert	4:32
4.	"I Want to Know You"	Andy Park	4:33
5.	"My Refuge"	Jeff Deyo, Otto Price, Jason Halbert	4:29
6.	"I Could Sing of Your Love Forever" (featuring Lisa Kimmey-Bragg)	Martin Smith	4:25
7.	"Holiness" (featuring Wilshire)	Scott Underwood	7:12
8.	"Carried Away"	Jeff Deyo, Jason Halbert	4:15
9.	"Something About That Name" (featuring Kevin Max)	William and Gloria Gaither	4:01
10.	"I Need You"	Jeff Deyo, Jason Halbert	5:24
11.	"Open the Eyes of My Heart"	Paul Baloche	5:22
12.	"The Heart of Worship"	Matt Redman	7:22

== Personnel ==
Sonicflood

- Jeff Deyo – lead vocals, guitars, tambourine
- Jason Halbert – Hammond B3 organ, keyboards, programming, backing vocals
- Dwayne Larring – guitars, Ebow, noises, backing vocals
- Aaron Blanton – drums, percussion

Additional Musicians

- Bryan Lenox
- Mark Lee Townsend
- George Cocchini
- Barry Graul
- Micah Wilshire
- John McKinzie
- Otto Price
- Greg Herrington
- Ric Robbins
- John Catchings – cello
- Kristin Wilkinson – viola
- David Davidson – violin, string arrangements
- Lisa Kimmey-Bragg – vocals (6)
- Wilshire – vocals (7)
- Kevin Max – vocals (9)

== Production ==
- The Gotee Brothers – executive producers
- Mike McGlaflin – A&R direction
- Sonicflood – producers, art direction
- Otto Price – additional production, additional programming, additional arrangements, engineer
- Bryan Lenox – vocal producer, engineer, mixing, vocal recording
- Jim McCastlin – engineer
- Todd Robbins – additional engineer
- Eric Wolf – mastering at Wolf Mastering (Nashville, Tennessee)
- Kerri McKeehan-Stuart – art direction, album design, underwater photography
- Reid Waltz – graphic imaging
- Tony Stone Images – cover photography
- Ron Keith – underwater photography
- Focus Right Management – management
