= Seranation =

American pop/reggae rock band

- Origin: Treasure Island, Florida
- Genres: Reggae rock, Pop
- Years active: (2014–present)
- Labels: LAW Records
- Members: J. Carter Gleason; Adam Hocker; Bianca Schlosser; Josh Hasak
- Past members: Beard Bruce; Colin Smith; Matt Knabe; Josh Baron
- Website: Official website

Seranation is an American pop, reggae rock band from Treasure Island, St. Petersburg, Florida.

The band's music features a 'unique blend of pop-reggae/rock' that they labeled as "Tropical-Rock" from their sunny surroundings.

== History ==
=== Formation (2015) ===
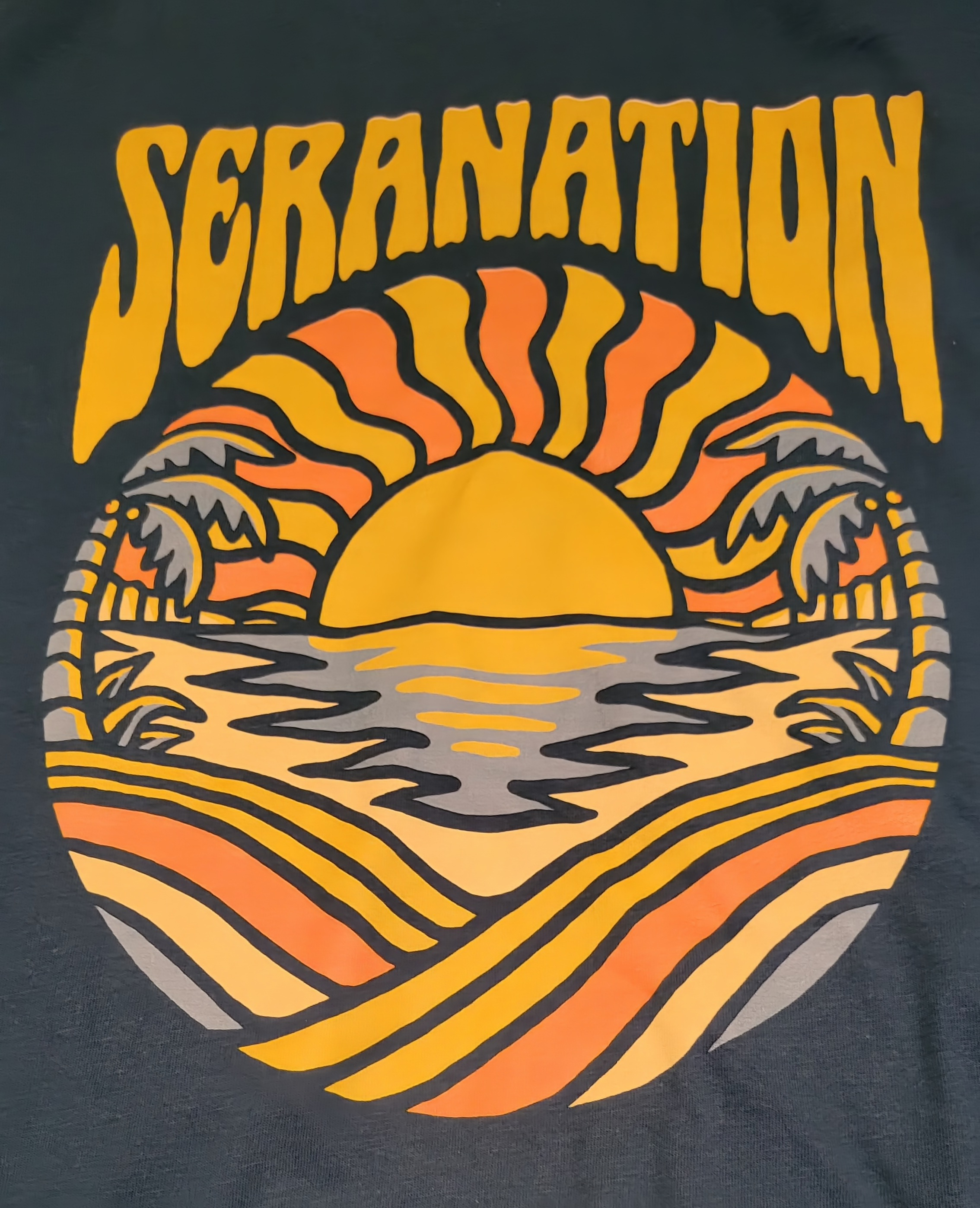
Logo

Seranation was formed in 2015, by guitarist Adam Hocker and bassist Bianca Schlosser formally from the reggae band, Roots For Change. Shortly after, the met up with lead singer J. Carter Gleason (or simply "J") who auditioned for them by singing the Sublime song "Garden Grove". Next, they needed a name to represent the members diverse musical backgrounds. It was J. Carter who came up with the band's name. After singing about a co-worker named Sarah. He kept singing, "It's like a Sarah-nation!" And that was it, "Seranation" was born out of the word "serenade". Later on, they added Josh Baron on drums and Beard Bruce on keyboard and saxophone, as well as guitarist Colin Smith.

=== Island Thinkin (2015) ===
The band recorded their first full-length studio album, Island Thinkin on September 17, 2015, as a self-produced release. The 10-track debut features singles, "What Up!" and "Flip Side", as well as the title song.

=== Livin' the Dream (2018) ===
Seranation recorded their second studio album titled, Livin' the Dream on March 23, 2018. The 10-track follow-up was released on Pepper's LAW Records, working with Josh Saldate and Greg Shields, lead singer of label-mates Kash'd Out, recording at Sound Lounge Studios. J. Carter explains the album's name, "We were trying to inspire people. When you're down and out, keep pushing through. We want to spread good vibes with it. We want people to know they're capable of making their dreams happen, just as we are doing the same thing. It's us really committing to living the dream." The band really brings their "Florida vibes" with them in this album. Adam added, "There is a deeper message than just the Floridian lifestyle, a responsibility when creating music." The band also added guitarist Matt Knabe after Smith left.

=== Compilation and singles (2019–2023) ===
In 2021, Seranation was one of several reggae rock and punk bands on The House That Bradley Built, a charity compilation honoring Sublime's lead singer Bradley Nowell, helping musicians with substance abuse. They covered Sublime's song "Ebin" on the Deluxe Edition which was released on January 12, 2021.

The band also recorded and released several singles over the years, along with music videos. Some singles include, "Sweet Tempation", "Dangerous", and "Surfboard", which were co-written and produced by Rome Ramirez of Sublime with Rome, which were released under his own record label, Fresh Goods.

=== Meant To Be (2024) ===
On September 26, 2024, Seranation released their second full-length studio album, Meant To Be on their record label, Livin' the Dream Records. It features 12 new tracks with the singles, "Not Today", "Take Me Away", "Stick to Your Guns, "Getaway" and "Waves".

== Touring ==
Well known in their home state, Seranation have played and headlined at multiple local venues and festivals throughout the Sunshine State. As their popularity grew throughout the years, the band shared the stage with Ballyhoo!, Dirty Heads, Fortunate Youth, Florida's own and label mates, Kingston, Natural Vibrations, Resinated, Shwayze, Stick Figure and Three Legged Fox. Their first nationwide 8-state tour was the "None Escape the Law Tour" alongside Tunnel Vision and Orlando's own Kash'd Out starting at Reggae Rise Up Florida Festival in the band's hometown. In 2019, the band went on another nationwide tour supporting fellow reggae rock bands Sublime with Rome, Michael Franti, SOJA, and Common Kings.

== Musical Influences ==
Seranation's blend of reggae/rock fusion along with their catchy pop melodies is inspired by their different musical styles. For Bianca it was a mix of artists from the 70's; from Jimi Hendrix to their contemporaries like The Expendables and Slightly Stoopid. J's was inspired by the Red Hot Chili Peppers and especially Sublime whose CD was in constant rotation that he listened to a 'million times', which he said "reawakened his dream" of becoming a musician. Adam got a chance to meet his greatest inspiration; guitarist Raul Bianchi from The Expendables who taught him how to perfect his craft as a musician.

== Lineup ==
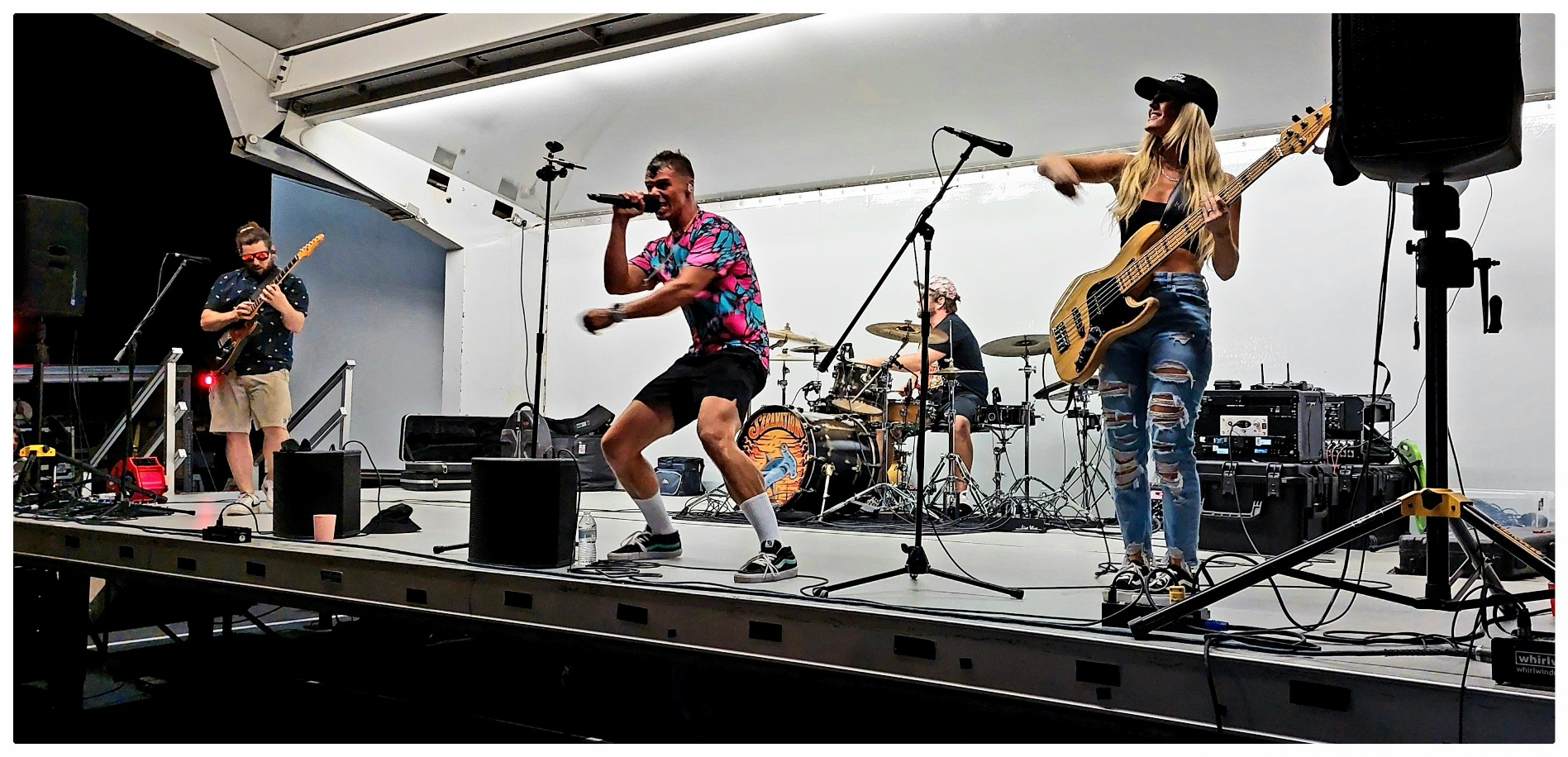
Seranation performing in Tenafly, New Jersey on August 16, 2022.

=== Current members ===
- Adam Hocker – lead singer, guitar, backup vocals (2015–present)
- Bianca Schlosser – bass, backup vocals (2015–present)
- Josh Hasak – drums (2018–present)

=== Past members ===
- J. Carter Gleason – lead singer (2015–2025)
- Josh Baron – drums, percussion (2015–2018)
- Beard Bruce – keyboard, saxophone (2015–2018)
- Colin Smith – guitar (2015–2017)
- Matt Knabe – guitar (2018–2020)

== Discography ==
=== Studio albums ===
Seranation Chart History
| Year | Album | Label | Billboard peak |
|---|---|---|---|
| 2014 | Island Thinkin | Self-released | — |
| 2018 | Livin the Dream | LAW Records | — |
| 2024 | Meant To Be | Livin the Dream Records | — |

=== Singles ===
| Title | Release date | Album |
|---|---|---|
| "All or Nothing" | 2015 | Island Thinkin |
| "Clarity" | 2015 | Island Thinkin |
| "Crazy" | 2015 | Island Thinkin |
| "Flip Side" | 2015 | Island Thinkin |
| "Floating Through" | 2015 | Island Thinkin |
| "Gone In No Time" | 2015 | Island Thinkin |
| "Island Thinkin" | 2015 | Island Thinkin |
| "Ride With Me" | 2015 | Island Thinkin |
| "Skin and Bones" | 2015 | Island Thinkin |
| "What Up!" | 2015 | Island Thinkin |
| "All Day" | 2018 | Livin the Dream |
| "Bonita" | 2018 | Livin the Dream |
| "Drift Away" | 2018 | Livin the Dream |
| "Easy" | 2018 | Livin the Dream |
| "Live the Dream" | 2018 | Livin the Dream |
| "Lonely Nights" | 2018 | Livin the Dream |
| "Lost Cause" | 2018 | Livin the Dream |
| "True Love" | 2018 | Livin the Dream |
| "Turn It Up" | 2018 | Livin the Dream |
| "Will To Survive" | 2018 | Livin the Dream |
| "Sweet Tempation" | July 22, 2019 | (Single) |
| "Dangerous" | November 8, 2019 | (Single) |
| "Surfboard" | April 10, 2020 | (Single) |
| "This One's on Me" | November 25, 2020 | (Single) |
| "Ebin" (Sublime cover) | January 12, 2021 | The House That Bradley Built (Deluxe Edition) |
| "It's All Right" | April 13, 2021 | (Single) |
| "Birds of Paradise" | February 4, 2022 | (Single) |
| "Not Today" | March 1, 2024 | Meant To Be |
| "Take Me Away" | April 19, 2024 | Meant To Be |
| "Stick to Your Guns" | May 28, 2024 | Meant To Be |
| "Getaway" | July 30, 2024 | Meant To Be |
| "Waves" | August 29, 2024 | Meant To Be |
