= Alabaster Box =

Alabaster Box may refer to:

- Alabaster Box (album), a 1999 album by gospel artist CeCe Winans
- Alabaster Box (band), a Christian rock band from Australia
- Alabaster Box (group), a Christian a capella/afropella group from Ghana
