= Technicolor (Parachute Band album) =

Studio album by Parachute Band
- Released: October 14, 2008
- Genre: Worship
- Label: Parachute Records
- Producer: Mark de Jong; Nic Manders; Sam de Jong

Parachute Band chronology
Roadmaps and Revelations (2007)	Technicolor (2008)	Untitled EP (2010)

Technicolor is the second album released by Gospel musical group Parachute Band. Released on October 14, 2008, the album features 11 new tracks drawing on the concept that God’s living water equals life in all its color. Technicolor debuted at #10 on the U.S. Christian/Gospel charts.

The album would later peak at #6 on the NZ album charts after the Parachute Music festival in January 2009.

== Track listing ==
No.	Title	Length
1.	"Come To The River"	2:43
2.	"Shout It Out"	2:52
3.	"Your Word"	3:46
4.	"Living Rain"	3:35
5.	"Take Over"	4:32
6.	"Come Before"	4:59
7.	"Grace"	6:10
8.	"In Liberty (Hallelujah)"	3:34
9.	"Glorious Is Our God"	3:39
10.	"No Eye Has Seen"	3:19
11.	"Everlasting"	5:50

Bonus Track Version
No.	Title	Length
1.	"Come To The River"	2:43
2.	"Shout It Out"	2:52
3.	"Your Word"	3:46
4.	"Living Rain"	3:35
5.	"Take Over"	4:32
6.	"Come Before"	4:59
7.	"Grace"	6:10
8.	"In Liberty (Hallelujah)"	3:34
9.	"Glorious Is Our God"	3:39
10.	"No Eye Has Seen"	3:19
11.	"Everlasting"	5:50
12.	"The Greatest Love"	4:21
13.	"Omega Levine's Testimony and Mercy"	10:45

== Personnel ==
- Mark de Jong - executive producer
- Nic Manders - producer
- Sam de Jong - producer
- Omega Levine - Vocals
- Sam de Jong - drums, guitars
- Alister Wood - Keys
- Rhys Machell - Bass
- Jeff Parsons - guitars

== Charts ==
Year	Chart	Peak position
2008	NZ iTunes Inspirational Charts	1
2009	NZ Album charts	6
2008	U.S. Billboard Top Christian Albums	10
2008	NZ iTunes mainstream album charts	12
