= Julia Grace =

- Born: Auckland, New Zealand
- Years active: 1999–present
- Musical career
- Genres: Celtic; pop; Folk; country; rock
- Occupation: Instrumentalist
- Formerly of: Elevator (2000–05)
- Website: https://www.juliagrace.co.nz/

Julia Grace is a New Zealand professional speaker and singer-songwriter. From 2000 to 2005, she was the lead vocalist for the Auckland-based live electronica outfit Elevator. In 2005, she began a solo career in songwriting which won her the success of the album of juliagrace and Beautiful Survivor in 2010. Since 2012, Grace is also known for her work as a public speaker and mental health advocate.

== Career ==
In 2000, Grace became involved in the New Zealand-based band Elevator, playing as a guitar and piano soloist until 2005. In October of that year, Grace left the band for a solo music career.

=== 2005–10: juliagrace and Beautiful Survivor ===
Grace's solo career began in 2005, with the release of her self-titled album on the Parachute Music label in October of that year. The album garnered radio success, scoring four number one singles in New Zealand as well as two top 20 hits on The Rock Across Australia music charts. She toured the U.S. and Australia as support act for the Parachute Band in early 2006, and was a mainstage performer at AGMF '06. Julia regularly featured at Parachute Music Festival.

Grace's self-titled album, "juliagrace", received the Tui Award for Best Gospel/Christian Album at the New Zealand Music Awards 2006. The award was presented by Prime Minister Helen Clark on behalf of the Recording Industry Association of New Zealand (RIANZ) on October 18, 2006, at the Aotea Centre in Auckland, New Zealand.

This Album was followed up by the NZ Music Award finalist 'Beautiful Survivor' as well as an EP of Hymns entitled 'It Is Well'. Grace was asked to present the award for Gospel Album of the Year at the 2016 awards ceremony.

=== 2011–present ===
In 2013, Grace released her first E.P album, It Is Well E.P, which reflected her divorce with her husband the previous year in 2012. The album was one of the most popular and top-charted E.Ps in New Zealand, earning an award at the 2016 New Zealand Gospel Album Awards Ceremony. In 2016, Grace released Girl on the Kitchen Floor.

Since a 2014 diagnosis of anxiety and depression, Grace has taken up public speaking about mental health. In 2024 she published a book titled Be Kind to Your Mind, and in 2025 was a finalist in NZBusiness Magazine's David Awards.

== Personal life ==
Grace's divorce took a toll on her self esteem. In an interview with Channel Magazine, she discussed this. "I didn't recognise the stressed out, sick person in the mirror," says Julia, looking back to when the man she had loved for her entire adult life walked away from her. "So, I stopped looking at her."

In 2016, following a personal journey of dealing with crisis, clinical depression and anxiety Grace released her latest album Girl On The Kitchen Floor which was also a finalist for a New Zealand Music Award in 2017.

In January 2019, she created a one-minute Facebook video series on Mental Wellness topics.

== Discography ==
- juliagrace (2005)
- Beautiful Survivor (2010)
- It Is Well E.P (2013)
- Girl On The Kitchen Floor (2016)
