= Alive in Concert =

Alive In Concert

Live album by The Lads
- Released: 2003
- Recorded: 2003
- Genre: Christian rock
- Label: Parachute Records
- Producer: Nick Abbot

The Lads chronology
Marvel (2001)	Alive In Concert (2003)	The Lads (2005)

Alive in Concert is a live album released by New Zealand Christian rock band The Lads in 2003, after being recorded during a sold-out concert at The Salvation Army Johnsonville, Wellington, New Zealand in 2002. It is the first live release from the band, their second being a DVD, Alive in Brisbane, which was recorded in Brisbane, Australia in 2005.

== Track listing ==
Tracks on the album include:

1. "Beetroot Stain" - 3:43
2. "International Mystery Man" - 4:04
3. "The Cactus Song" - 3:43
4. "Cannibalism" - 4:32
5. "Call My Name / I Could Sing of Your Love Forever" - 7:50
6. "Creator" - 5:47
7. "I'll Leave the Looking" - 3:40
8. "Hey Flower" - 6:08
9. "My Forever Smoochie Girl" - 4:00
10. "Faithful" - 3:47
11. "Ode to Joy / I Give it All" - 8:38
12. "Town" - 4:17
13. "Who is Mikey Trousers" - 3:19

== Personnel ==
The band is made up of the following members:

- Mark Millard – Vocals, Saxophone
- Bjorn Bennet – Guitar, Backing Vocals
- Bennett Knowles – Bass, Backing Vocals
- Chris White – Guitar, Synthesizer, Piano, Trumpet, Accordion, Backing Vocals
- Steve King – Drums, Backing Vocals
