= Arbor Day (album) =

- Album cover

Studio album by The Lads
- Released: 1996
- Studio: Vision Studios, Wellington, New Zealand
- Genre: Christian rock
- Length: 54:30
- Language: English
- Label: Parachute Productions
- Producer: Phil Hornblow, The Lads

The Lads chronology
Arbor Day (1996)	Lost @ Sea (1998)

Arbor Day is the second album by New Zealand Christian rock band The Lads, released in 1996.

== Track listing ==
All songs written by The Lads, except for "The Well is Deep" by Albert Osbourne.

No.	Title	Length
1.	"The Cactus Song"	4:06
2.	"Hey Flower"	4:58
3.	"On the Road"	4:53
4.	"Don't Look Away"	4:22
5.	"Higher Love"	3:23
6.	"I Want to be Faithful"	6:46
7.	"Song for Richard"	4:33
8.	"Mr. Nipsam-Man"	0:32
9.	"Arbor Day"	3:48
10.	"Into the Light"	4:09
11.	"Jesus"	4:21
12.	"The Well is Deep"	1:22
13.	"Jesus Part II: I Just Want to Say..."	5:21
14.	"Lift Him Up"	4:36

== Credits ==
The Lads are:

- Paul Zimbuli Cotton
- Bennett Knowles
- Steve King
- Mark Millard
- Chris White
- Recorded at Vision Studios, Wellington, NZ
- Producer by - Phil Hornblow, The Lads
- Sound engineer - Phil Hornblow
- Additional programming - Phil Hornblow
- Guitar engineer - Gary Taylor
- Additional guitar overdubs - Gary Taylor
- Song arrangement oversight - Karel Van Helden-Stevens
- Backing vocals coordinator - Karel Van Helden-Stevens
- Brass arrangement on 'Song for Richard' - Lucy Mulgan

Additional musicians:

- Cello - Rachel Macann
- Violin, Viola - Caroline Dewson
- Oboe - Georgina Coffey
- Trumpet - Mathew Constabie
- Trombone - Owen Clarke
- Brass Quintet on 'Don't Look Away' - Wellington South Salvation Army Band: Stephen Stein, Graerne Howan, David Flu, Phil Neal, Ian Gainsford
- Lowland Pipes - Grant Shearer
- Percussion - Lance Philip
- Saxophone solo on 'Lift Him Up' - Anton Wuts
- Backing vocals - Karel Van Helden-Stevens, Phil Hornblow
- Photography - Andrew Bridge
- Front Cover model - Jo Jo
- Artwork, layout, typography, printing - Anthony Haigh
