= Alabaster Box (band) =

Australian musical group

Alabaster Box is an Australian Christian pop rock band formed in the Gold Coast, Queensland, now based in the United States.

== Background ==
Alabaster Box formed in 1997 with original members vocalist Naarah Seagrott, guitarist Brett Seagrott, drummer Ben Woodward, and acoustic guitarist Sam Hatch. Originally, they played for youth at Christian Community Church. By mid-1999, Joshua Brown joined as keyboardist, and bassist Matt Smallbone joined after the band won a talent search from a Brisbane radio station. The band's 1998 debut, Alabaster Box, won three Sunnie Awards, including Best Pop Album and Best Gospel Album. Their 2001 album, Main Attraction, was produced by Vince Emmett and recorded at Kentucky's Melody Hill Farm Studios. The band began touring across Australia in 2000. In January 2006, they moved to Nashville, Tennessee.

== Members ==
- Naarah Seagrott: Vocals
- Brett Seagrott: Guitars

== Former members ==
- Joshua Brown: Keyboards & Programming
- Matt Smallbone: Bass
- Sam Hatch: Acoustic Guitar
- Ben Woodward: Drums

== Discography ==
- "Alabaster Box" - 1998
- "Show Me" EP - 2000
- "Main Attraction" - 2001
- "Love On The Radio" - 2004
- "Live at Ripley Road DVD" - 2006
- "We Will Not Be Silent" - 2008

=== Singles ===
For much of 2004 and continuing into 2005, Alabaster Box was in the top three 'most played Christian evangelist artists' in the country^{[which country?]} and has held down the number one spot for highest independent album sales in the same category.

- 2009 "Fearlessly Stumble" #1 on TRAA and Rock Across Australia Charts
- 2008 "New York" #1 for 9 consecutive weeks TRAA & Rock Across Australia Charts
- 2008 "We Will Not Be Silent" #1 for 12 consecutive weeks TRAA & Rock Across Australia Charts
- 2004 "Love on the Radio" #1 TRAA RadioActive Song (MAY)
- 2004 "Love on the Radio" #1 HOT 25 COUNTDOWN
- 2004 "There's Hope" #1 Most Played Independent Song by Australasian Artist on Australian Christian Radio
- 2004 "There's Hope" #1 for 8 consecutive weeks TRAA & Rock Across Australia Charts TOP 30
- 2001 "Main Attraction" #1 TRAA RadioActive Song (Sept)
- 2001 "It's Beginning Today" #2 TRAA RadioActive Artist
- 2001 "It's Beginning Today" #1 TRAA RadioActive Australasian Song and Artist
- 2001 "Carry On" #2 TRAA RadioActive Australasian Song
- 2000 "Show Me" (single) #1 TRAA RadioActive Australasian Song (Oct)

== Tours ==
- Alabaster Box play approximately 200 shows a year in schools, churches, youth groups, festivals and concerts.

Mainstage Slots:

- Australian Gospel Music Festival (Aust)
- Ichthus Festival (USA)
- Sonfest (Aust)
- Black Stump (Aust)
- Forest Edge Festival (Aust)
- Saltbush Festival (Aust)
- Parachute Music Festival (New Zealand)
- Easterfest (formerly the Australian Gospel Music Festival) (Australia) 2008
- Samstock Music Festival (New Zealand) 2008
- Australian tour with Newsboys - 2008

Alabaster Box has travelled extensively throughout Australia, and has gone on ten tours of New Zealand, six of the US and one in England.

== Awards ==
2004 Australian Gospel Music Awards

- Best Music- 'There's Hope”

2003 Johnny Dennis Music Award

- Best Popular Song- “There's Hope”

2004 Music Oz Awards

- Best Gospel Song- Runner up

1999 QLD Recording Industry Awards

- Best Pop Album
- Best Gospel Album
- Best Engineer

1998 96Five FM Creative Challenge

- Best Song
