= Marvel (album) =

Studio album by The Lads
- Released: 2001
- Recorded: 2001
- Studio: Revolver Studios, Auckland, NZ, York Street, Auckland, NZ
- Genre: Christian rock
- Length: 46:33
- Language: English
- Label: Parachute Records
- Producer: Malcolm Welsford, Nic Manders

The Lads chronology
Lost @ Sea (1998)	Marvel (2001)	Alive in Concert (2003)

Professional ratings
Review scores
Source	Rating
Allmusic	link
Cross Rhythms	link
Soul Purpose	(74%) link Archived 16 October 2008 at the Wayback Machine

Marvel is the third full-length release from the New Zealand Christian rock band The Lads. Following its release in 2001 it won "Gospel Album of the Year" at the 2002 New Zealand Music Awards.

== Track listing ==
1. "Wonderful Day" - 3:26
2. "Creator" - 4:05
3. "Who is Mikey Trousers?" - 3:08
4. "You're a Star" - 4:13
5. "Call My Name" - 3:54
6. "Warm" - 4:54
7. "Freedom" - 3:21
8. "Cannibalism" - 3:36
9. "International Mystery Man" - 3:29
10. "Supersonic" - 3:22
11. "Open" - 4:23
12. "Island" - 4:42

== Singles ==
Year	Single	Chart	Peak position
2001	"Creator"	New Zealand RIANZ Singles Chart	27
2001	"International Mystery Man"	New Zealand RIANZ Singles Chart	39

== Trivia ==
- The song "Who Is Mikey Trousers?" was featured on the 'Best of the Pacific' playlist, an in-flight radio show played on all Canadian Airlines and Air Canada flights. They are the only New Zealand band to achieve this feat.

== Personnel ==
- Mark Millard – Vocals, Saxophone
- Matt Chapman – Guitar, Backing Vocals
- Bennett Knowles – Bass, Backing Vocals
- Chris White – Guitar, Synthesizer, Piano, Trumpet, Accordion, Backing Vocals
- Steve King - Drums, Backing Vocals
