= Rapture Ruckus =

New Zealand Christian hip hop and rock band

- Origin: Wellington, New Zealand
- Genres: Christian hip hop, rap rock
- Years active: 2001–2020
- Labels: Parachute, BEC
- Members: Brad Dring; Mike Aitofi; Joshua Stein; Geoff Duncan
- Past members: Doug Aitofi; Ross Nansen; Soane Tonga; Gio Lesa; Caleb Robinson; Rob Oliver
- Website: www.raptureruckus.com

Rapture Ruckus was a Christian hip hop and rock band from Wellington, New Zealand, signed to BEC Recordings. They have released four albums: Rapture Ruckus in 2002, I Believe in 2006, Rapture Ruckus Live at World's End in 2008, and Rapture Ruckus in 2010 as debut album with BEC Recordings. I Believe won an award for Best Gospel/Christian Album at the New Zealand Music Awards, Rapture Ruckus Live at World's End debuted at No. 7 on the New Zealand album charts and Rapture Ruckus (2010) was nominated for a Dove Award for Best Rap/Hip Hop Album. Headed by Brad Dring, they have been a headline act at Parachute Music Festival several times and now in the US at Jesus Jam, Creation Festival, Sonshine Festival Three Rivers Festival and Festival One.

== Formation and Rapture Ruckus (2001–2005) ==
In 2001, a then 18-year-old Brad Dring, struggling with a drug addiction and his own passion for music, was trying to find purpose in life. One day, while high on the back seat of his friend's car, he was challenged on where his life was headed. He headed to church and committed his life to God. Refocusing his passion for music, Brad partnered with Doug Aitofi and formed Rapture Ruckus. They recorded a 9 Track album of the same name and released it through a local Wellington indie Label. They became a fast success and were soon signed with Parachute Records. The album sold the most units ever recorded up to that point at the Parachute Music festival that year. They proceeded to become a popular support touring act with larger Christian bands around New Zealand.

== I Believe (2006–2007) ==
In early 2006 Rapture Ruckus released a limited edition EP for their album called Rapture Ruckus EP, the EP sold well and built up anticipation among fans for the eventual release of the album. In late 2006 they released their much anticipated album I Believe. Produced and written by Brad Dring and longtime collaborator Geoff Duncan, the album spawned the hit Singles "Freight Train", "Lose Control", and "I Believe". The album pushed them into international success with breakthroughs in Australia and South Africa and won them the Best Gospel/Christian Album at the New Zealand Music Awards. A Music Video for Lose Control was posted on YouTube in 2007 and some months later another Music video for "I Believe" was released online. Around this time Doug Aitofi left the group and Brad Dring continued the act as a soloist with the band as Backup.

== Rapture Ruckus Live at World's End (2008) ==
In early December 2008 Rapture Ruckus released their latest album, a live CD/DVD of their performance at Parachute Music festival 2008 titled Rapture Ruckus Live at World's End. The Album had Two new singles "One" and "No Matter What," it made a debut in the NZ Top 40 at No. 7 and also made it to No. 1 on the Hip Hop page on NZ ITunes. The album was well received and sold very well at stores around the Country and at the next years Parachute Music Festival. The DVD also features interviews with Brad Dring and other Ruckus Members as well as the Parachute records CEO.

== Hold on / Rapture Ruckus (2009–2010) ==
In early 2008, Brad Dring confirmed that a new album was to be released in late 2008. However the date was pushed back, and "Live at World's End" was released instead. At Parachute Music festival 2009, the band performed two songs off the album "Hold on" and "Catch Me Ridin'". In February and March Rapture Ruckus toured Australia and South Africa with Parachute Band performing their new songs and beginning to build up anticipation for the upcoming album.

On 4 November he posted on his Twitter that the new Rapture Ruckus album was almost finished and on 19 November he confirmed that they were now mixing the new album.

On 25 November 2009 it was announced that Rapture Ruckus was being signed to BEC Recordings, a sub label of Tooth & Nail Records and that their upcoming 4th studio album would be distributed throughout the US as a result of this. The band has confirmed that they are moving to Nashville USA and will be promoting their upcoming album throughout the US. They also confirmed that the album would be released in early 2010.

On 29 January at Parachute Music Festival 2010, the band released a limited edition EP labelled "Hold On" with 6 songs, "All We Got", "Tonight", "Hold On", "All Things New", "Catch Me Ridin'" and "No Matter What" as a taster for the new album to be released through BEC Recordings in March 2010. Only 640 copies were released and all were sold within the first 24 hours of the festival. The EP charted at No. 7 on the NZ Top 40 albums chart and No. 1 on the NZ Independent albums chart.

On 20 April it was announced that the album would actually only be an EP and that it would be a US release of Hold On with a slightly different track listing and title "Rapture Ruckus". "Hold On" would be released fully in New Zealand on 8 June containing the same track listing as the original EP released at Parachute. The band has also confirmed that they will be touring with The Letter Black in support of the album.

During late 2010, the band toured New Zealand with Manafest, Newworldson and New Empire as support acts. followed by a tour labelmates "The Museum" in February and March 2010. The album was nominated for a Dove Award in the category of Rap/Hip Hop Album of the Year.

== Open Your Eyes (2011–2012) ==
In early 2011, Rapture Ruckus confirmed to fans that a new studio release was imminent later in the year through Facebook and Twitter and in June it was officially announced that their fourth full studio album would be released on 27 September 2011. The album debuted at No. 11 in New Zealand before peaking at No. 9; it was nominated for a New Zealand music award for "Best Christian Album". The band also announced a 2012 tour with Family Force 5.

== Invader Vol. I & Invader Vol. II (2013–2020) ==
In 2013, Rapture Ruckus announced via their Facebook page that they wanted their fans' help to fund two new albums and a music video. Their fans worldwide quickly met the amount, and frontman Brad Dring announced the two fan-funded projects would be dubbed "Invader Vol. I and II". The band had previously released one single at Parachute Festival 2013, "In Crowd". The band re-recorded the song for studio release in the first album, and Invader Vol. I was released on 25 February 2014. The release of the album was accompanied by a music video for In Crowd, featuring Soul Glow Activatur, formerly of Family Force 5. Invader Vol. II was released 7 April 2015. They recently released a new single, "Volcano", featuring Swedish artist Jonathan Thulin.

They opened for The Newsboys' "We Believe" tour in 2014. They also came back to New Zealand to headline Ulbricht Management's "Worship Experience II" in Auckland. They are scheduled to come back to New Zealand in January 2015, to headline Ulbricht's Cloud Festival at the QBE Stadium.

The band had their final show at Festival One 2020.

== Members ==
- Brad Dring (Rapture Ruckus) – vocals (2001–2020)
- Geoff Duncan – guitar, keyboard, producer, composer (2006–2020)
- Josh Stein – drums (2011–2020)
- Doug Aitofi – backup vocals (2001–2006)
- Rob Oliver – DJ (2003–2007)
- Sam de Vetter – percussion (2005)
- Caleb Robinson – bass (2006–2008)
- Gio Lesa – drums (2006–2010)
- Soane Tonga – DJ (2007–2010)
- Ross Nansen – drums (2010–2011)
- Mike Aitofi – bass (2010–2013)

== Discography ==
=== Albums ===
- Rapture Ruckus (2002)
- I Believe (2006)
- Rapture Ruckus Live at World's End (2008)
- Open Your Eyes (2011)
- Invader (2015)

=== EPs ===
- Rapture Ruckus limited edition EP (2006)
- Hold On (2010)
- Rapture Ruckus (2010)
- Invader Volume 1 (2014)
- Invader Volume 2 (2015)

=== Singles ===
- "I Believe"
- "Freight Train"
- "Lose Control"
- "No Matter What"
- "Tonight"
- "All Things New"
- "Hold On"
- "This Little Light"
- "In Crowd" (featuring Soul Glow Activatur (Solomon Olds) of Family Force 5)
- "In This Together" (featuring Shuree)
- "Mindfield" (Invader Vol. II – released 2015)
- "Volcano" (featuring Jonathan Thulin)

=== Guest appearances ===
- Creation Festival
- House of Breakthrough – Zero T
- Blown Away – Magnify
- On Fire – Rawsrvnt
- Joshua Early
- FLOOD: A Christian event located in North America, USA, Indiana, La Porte at the Civic Auditorium – Ethan Smith
- Acquire the Fire events throughout America
- "Worship Experience II" with Lecrae. (2014. Victory Church, Auckland NZ. Presented by Ulbricht Management.)
- "Cloud Festival" (Presented by Ulbricht Management. Held at QBE Stadium, Albany NZ in January 2015)
