= Late 80's Mercedes =

- Origin: New Zealand
- Genres: Swing-funk
- Years active: 2000 – present
- Labels: Control

Late 80's Mercedes is a New Zealand swing-funk nonet, formed in 2000. They experienced their first chart success in January 2010 with their self-titled debut extended play disc Late 80's Mercedes released at the 2010 Parachute music festival. The EP reached number fourteen on the New Zealand Albums Chart in the week of its release.
