= Kingston (New Zealand band) =

- Origin: Auckland, New Zealand
- Genres: Pop, rock
- Years active: 2006–present
- Label: Unsigned
- Members: Dan Gibson – vocals Scott Cleary – guitar Shohan Hustwick – bass Ben Barter – drums Tim Youngson – live touring member

Kingston are a pop/rock band from Auckland, New Zealand who formed in 2006. The band are best known for their song "Good Good Feeling" which was used in a New Zealand ad campaign for KFC.

== Early beginnings ==
Dan Gibson (vocals) and Scott Cleary (guitar) attended the same high school and wrote songs together as teens. Dan met Shohan Hustwick (Bass) at a Waddington youth camp in 2005 and invited her to practice as they wanted to form a band. The trio heard of Ben Barter (drums) through the local music scene and they had their first practise as a band in Ben's Mum's sewing room.

== First singles and gaining popularity ==
Kingston's music has been featured on television ads for V and promotion for Pepsi both in New Zealand and Australia. They have had two independently released singles, Good Good Feeling and Round We Go.

Kingston have also played at many international music festivals around the world such as Parachute Music Festival, One Movement Festival in Perth, CMJ Festival in New York City, and many other local gigs in countries around the world.

The group's debut album Black & Bloom was released in 2013.

=== Singles ===
Year	Title	NZ Chart	Album
2008	"Good Good Feeling"	—	Non-album single
2009	"Round We Go"	—	Non-album single
