= Mumsdollar =

New Zealand rock band

- Origin: South Auckland, New Zealand
- Genres: Alternative; Punk; Rock
- Years active: 1998–2009
- Label: Cruel Records
- Members: Ben Claxton; Dave Barr; Steve Wood; Pete Wood; Tim Beale
- Past members: Duncan Jeffery.

Mumsdollar was a New Zealand rock band formed in 1998 with Ben Claxton on lead vocals, Dave Barr on guitar and backing vocals, Tim Beale on drums, and brothers Pete Wood, on guitar, and Steve Wood on bass and backing vocals.

== History ==
Mumsdollar was formed when Ben Claxton on lead vocals, Dave Barr on guitar and backing vocals, Tim Beale on drums, and brothers Pete Wood, on guitars, and Steve Wood on bass and backing vocals got together to enter YFC Capital Teen Convention (CTC) band competition. Their name was chosen when Ben was at Hillsong Conference and at offering time only had 1 dollar, his mum's dollar. They originally intended to change the name after CTC but it just stuck.

Since then Mumsdollar has become one of the biggest bands in the kiwi music scene. They have also released their album A Beautiful Life in Japan. Mumsdollar were also one of the favourites at the New Zealand Christian music festival Parachute.

In 2009 their Album "Ruins" won a Vodafone New Zealand Music Award for "Best Gospel/Christian Album" beating Parachute Band, The Ember Days and Primalband. It also Charted at #15 on the New Zealand Album charts in late January 2009.

== Break Up ==
In 2009 Mumsdollar announced that they would be breaking up at the end of the year due to lead singer Ben Claxton going on his OE. They performed a final tour around New Zealand in early December. Ben Claxton was working in England as a Physical education Teacher at a secondary school, but is now at Taupo Nui a Tia College in Taupo as the head principal.

== Reunion ==
It was announced on 12 September 2012 that Mumsdollar would be reuniting to play one show at Parachute Music Festival in 2013. Mumsdollar then reunited again in 2025 to perform at Festival One in Cambridge NZ.

== Related Projects ==
Ben and Dave from Mumsdollar also make up an acoustic band called Shooting Stars.

== Members ==
=== Current members ===
- Ben Claxton – lead vocals (1998–2009)
- Dave Barr – guitar, backing vocals (1998–2009)
- Steve Wood – bass guitar, backing vocals (1998–2009)
- Pete Wood – guitar (1998–2009)
- Tim Beale – drums (1998–2009)

=== Former members ===
- Duncan – horns (2001)

== Discography ==
- Buy This Album So We Can Make A Good One (demo) (2000)
- For Christ's Sake (2001)
- Eastern Time (2002)
- Eastern Time (re-release) (2004)
- A Beautiful Life EP (2005)
- A Beautiful Life (2005)
- Ruins (2008)

== Sources ==
- "Mumsdollar - South Side Punk Rock". Archived from the original on 5 March 2007.
- "Mumsdollar - Muzic.NZ - Musicians & Bands". www.muzic.net.nz.
- "Follow Amplifier". www.amplifier.co.nz.
- "Soul Purpose :: Life, Faith, Music, SmallTalk » Mumsdollar Goodness". Archived from the original on 14 October 2008.
- "Best Gospel/Christian Album « Vodafone New Zealand Music Awards". Archived from the original on 12 October 2009.
