= Elliot Richardson (musician) =

- Origin: California, United States
- Genres: Pop, alternative rock, adult contemporary,
- Occupations: Musician, composer, producer, mixer, engineer, songwriter
- Instruments: Guitar, bass, keys, drums, percussion

Elliot Richardson is an American music producer, mixer, songwriter, and multi instrumentalist. His productions have gone on to be televised; charted on the top 40 Billboard charts; and have received worldwide radio airplay. His productions have been used and played on, Grey's Anatomy, One Tree Hill, Ghost Whisper, MTV Real World, and other various Television shows. He resides in the greater Nashville area and is continuing his work with nationally known up and coming artists. He has worked with artists ranging from independent to major record label artists.

== Richardson's bands ==
- Page (lead vocals, guitar)
- Driving By Braille (leadd vocals, guitar)
- Midsummer (guitar, keyboards, backing vocals)
- Peoplemover (guitar, backing vocals)
- Venus Infers (guitar, keyboards, backing vocals)
- Phil Joel (guitar, keyboards, backing vocals)
- The Lads (guitar, backing vocals)
- Uovoixn (solo project)

== Discography ==
- Melee- (Warner Bros.) Singles and Christmas singles top 40 on Billboard Japan-Producer. Mixer. Engineer.
- Limbeck- (doghouse records)Co-producer. Engineer.
- Venus Infers- (Buddy Buddy Music Pub., KROQ 106.7, indie 103.1, MTV, O.C. music award winner)Producer. Mixer. Engineer. Mellotron. Percussion.
- Honey Pie- (TV publishing) Co-Producer. Mixer. Engineer. Percussion.
- Trent Dabbs- (ready set records, One Tree Hill, Grey's Anatomy)co-writer. producer. mixer. engineer.instrumentation.
- Shelly Fraley- (One Tree Hill, Grey's Anatomy, Pretty Little Liars) co-writer. producer. mixer. engineer. instrumentation
- Davis Fetter- Producer. Mixer. Engineer. Keys. Bass. Percussion. Bgv's
- Jessica Frech- Producer. Mixer. Engineer. Guitars. Synths. Rhodes. Piano. Percussion. Bgv's. String Arrangements
- Big Bad Wolf- Producer. Mixer. Engineer.
- Starshine- Co-producer. Engineer. guitars.
- Topher Daniels- Co-producer. Engineer. Mixer. Mastering. guitars. percussion.
- Sacha Sacket- Mixer.
- Nathan Roberts- Mixer. Mastering.
- Kingston- Mixer.
- Fever Fever- Producer. Engineer. Mixer. Keys. Noises. Mastering
- Aushua- (KROQ 106.7)Co-Producer. Mixer. Engineer. Keys. Mastering.
- Mike Cambell- (Guitar for Tom Petty and the Heartbreakers)- engineer
- Brian Ray- ( Guitar for Paul McCartney) engineer.
- Fairchild- Engineer.
- Suburban Legends- Mixer. Mastering.
- Modern Subject- Producer. Mixer. Engineer. Keys. Percussion. Bass. Mastering.
- Phil Joel- Guitars. Bgv's. Keys. Piano. Engineer. Producer. Mixer.
- Driving By Braille- Vocals. Guitar. Songwriting
- Lovelite- (come & live records)Producer. Engineer. Guitars. Keys. Piano. Percussion. Programming. String Arrangements.
- Ladies & Gentelman- Mixer. Mastering.
- EEII- Mixer.
- Ryan Baxley- Engineering. Mixer
- Tarmac- Mixer.
- Peoplemover- Guitars. Vocals. Engineer.
- The O.C. Supertones- (bec)Engineer.
- Letter Kills- (island records)Engineer.
- Unionvox- Mixer.
- Five Letters- Mixer. Mastering.
- The Fictions- Producer. Mixer. Engineer.
- Derek Dahl- (O.C. Music Award, TV Publishing)Producer. Mixer. Engineer.
- The Lads- (TBN, Lifeway TV series) composer/songwriter/producer.
- Stereo Intellect- Producer. Mixer. Engineer. Keys. Piano. Gtrs. Percussion. Programming
- It's Like Love- Producer. Mixer. Engineer.
- Italian/Japanese- Mastering.
- Paper Thin Walls- (KROQ 106.7)Co-Producer. Mixer. Engineer.
- Jai Callahan- Mixer.
- Stellar- Co-Producer. Engineer.
- Blue Background- Producer. Mixer. Engineer.
- Route of Soul- Co-Producer. Mixer. Engineer.
- Danny Larsh- Co-Producer. Mixer. Engineer.
- All About The Benjamins- Mastering.
- Fly Denver- Mixer.
- Robert Mayer- Producer. Mixer. Engineer.
- Kelly Ruppe- (Northern Records) Producer. Mixer. Engineer. Guitars. Bgv's. Bass. Keys. Programming.
- Crave Worship Band- Engineer.
- Sas- Co-Producer. Mixer. Engineer.
- The Deal- (throwdown records) Engineer.
- Muse of Fire- Mixer. Engineer.
- Hoodwink- Engineer. Mixer.
- Soonmee Kwan- Engineer. Mixer.
- Frank not so hotsa sinatra- Mixer. Engineer.
- South Shores Church Band- Co-Producer. Mixer. Engineer. Guitars. Keys. Bgv's. Programming.
- Uovoixn- Producer. Mixer. Engineering.Songwriter
- Rami Alfara- Mixer. Engineer.
- Ann Laui- Mixer. Engineer.
- Midnight Swordance- Co-Producer. Mixer. Engineer.
- Marin Smith- Producer. Mixer. Engineer.
- South Shores Church choir and orchestra- Mixer. Engineer. Mastering.
- South Coast Singers and Orchestra- Engineer.
- Tori Lee- Mixer. Engineer.
- Crescent Drive- Mixer. Engineer.
- Bootleg- Engineer.
- BOH- (O.C. Music Award winner) Mixer. Engineer.
- Curt Philips- (IE Music Award winner)Mixer. Engineer. Programming. Guitars. Bgv's. Mastering.
- Dead Mans Dollar- (O.C. Music Award Nominee)Co-Producer. Mixer. Engineer. Mastering.
- Phinehas- Co-Producer. Mixer. Engineer. Mastering.
- Nathaniel Meyst- Producer. Mixer. Engineer. Guitars. Programming. Keys. Mastering.
- Stairwells- Producer. Mixer. Engineer. Guitars. String Arrangements. Keys.
- Fire in Cairo- Mixer. Engineer.
- Julie Downs- Producer. Mixer. Engineer. Guitars. Bass. Programming. Keys. Piano. Percussion. Noises. Arrangements
