= Sonicflood =

American contemporary worship band

- Origin: Nashville, Tennessee, U.S.
- Genres: Modern worship, CCM
- Years active: 1997–present
- Labels: Gotee, INO, Resonate
- Members: Rick Heil; Ron Robinson; Phil Snowden; Dango Cellan; Chris Bevins
- Past members: See: Members
- Website: sonicflood.com

Sonicflood (sometimes stylized as SONICFLOOd) is an American contemporary worship music band from Nashville, Tennessee, that has been touted as "The Fathers of the Modern Worship Movement." The group took the name "Sonicflood", a reference to a line in the Book of Revelation 19:6.

They released their debut album at a time when such music was gaining commercial success in the Christian music industry. In turn, their success fed the contemporary worship music genre, expanding its appeal.

Since their debut, Sonicflood has sold almost two million albums, and produced top worship hits (often as covers) including "I Could Sing of Your Love Forever", "Resonate", "Cry Holy" and "Here I am to Worship". In the early years of their existence, the group earned two Dove awards and three further nominations, and one Grammy nomination. Additionally, their eponymous debut took Gold status, and spawned several No. 1 hits on Christian radio.

== History ==
=== As Zilch ===
The band originally formed in 1997 under the name, "Zilch". Zilch began as dc Talk's traveling band, forming into an independent act in 1997. The initial recording lineup was lead singer and guitarist Mark Lee Townsend, keyboardist Jason Halbert, bassist Otto "Sugar Bear" Price and drummer Rick May. Zilch released its first album, Platinum, in 1997 on Gotee Records but received little publicity. Platinum featured a modern rock sound with clear influences from 1960s pop music. One review cited the sound as being similar to that of All Star United, and another to Weezer plus pop and hip-hop influences.

This release was not praise and worship music, which the band would soon become known for, but contained more standard fare, including songs on topics like friendship, complacency, and priorities. Overall, the band was characterized as not taking themselves seriously, for instance by including a cover of the Schoolhouse Rock! song "My Hero, Zero", and reflected in the band's name, which was taken from the song by the same name written by The Monkees. Likewise, the title of the album was a play on their own status as musicians. "We're appointing ourselves superstars with a 'Platinum' album..." Jason Halbert told one reporter, "That basically means Zilch!," Their song "In The Sky" is an answer to two hits at the time, Joan Osborne "One of Us" and Dishwalla "Counting Blue Cars", opening with the line, "... she asked if God was just a slob like us, well maybe something there is lacking," the second verse begins with, "Let me tell you all my thoughts on God, cause I just met with Him this morning..."

In early 1998 Mark Lee Townsend stepped down from the role of lead singer and was replaced by then-independent artist Jeff Deyo. Zilch would play shows, sometimes ending them with a praise song such as "Lord, I Lift Your Name on High." The band found that playing such music changed the nature of audience interaction with their performance, in positive ways.

=== Formation of Sonicflood ===
"We had misconceptions of what [praise and worship] was... Our idea in the past was that it had to be acoustic guitar, piano, and organ. Now, all of that goes out the window."

— Jeff Deyo on praise and worship music

Their label took notice as well, and eventually suggested that the band consider recording a full-length praise and worship album. This idea was initially met with resistance from the band, which was already in the process of recording a second album under the title Millennium. Eventually, the band agreed to do a praise and worship as a one-off, with no intention of continuing beyond the single album. However, as the recording progressed, the band decided to commit to the project. Jeff Deyo characterized the band's name change as a sign of that commitment, saying that it was similar to the story of the conversion of Paul of Tarsus.

Sonicflood began rotating personnel making changes that would heavily impact the future of the band. Otto Price played bass, co-produced, and shared some writing credits on the album, but not wanting to continue touring, dropped out of the core band. Price would eventually take the spot of vice president of A&R at Word Records. Mark Lee Townsend did similarly, and was listed on Sonicflood as an additional musician. Already an industry veteran, he went on to produce albums for The OC Supertones and Relient K, among others. Additionally, he intended to release a second project under the name Zilch. However, despite occasional status updates throughout the first decade of the 2000s, that album is yet unreleased.

Seven Day Jesus guitarist Dwayne Larring and drummer Aaron Blanton became members of the band, bringing their number to four. The original lineup, under which the album Sonicflood was recorded consisted of Deyo, Halbert, Blanton, and Larring. Heil, then the Big Tent Revival bass guitar player, took over on bass guitar in early 1999 and joined as a founding member before Sonicflood began touring, but did not appear on the album.

=== Sonicflood and Sonicpraise ===
Sonicflood released its debut album in February 1999. With this release, the band became one of many bands in the burgeoning genre of praise and worship music, joining Delirious?, Hillsong, Matt Redman, and others at a time when the genre was a fast-growing part of the Christian music industry. The album landed on Billboard charts including the Billboard 200, the top 10 Christian albums, and peaking at No. 2 on the Heatseekers Chart. The band would stay on the top 10 Christian album charts well into the year 2000 (for over 72 weeks).

The release had two No. 1 hits on Christian radio, "I Want to Know You" (written by Andy Park) and "I Could Sing Of Your Love Forever" (written by Martin Smith of Delirious?), and several lesser charting singles. The latter was probably their most well known song, and would gain an additional Dove nomination the following year, in the "Song of the Year" category. The band garnered three Dove Award nominations in 2000 and one win, for "Praise and Worship Album". In 1999 the band recorded a live album at the Flevo Festival but featuring content from other shows as well. Originally scheduled for a late 2000 release, changes in the band's structure would delay the album until 2001.

In the fall of 1999 the band toured with speaker Josh McDowell. The following Spring Sonicflood joined the "Love Liberty Disco Tour", headlined by the Newsboys. The band also recorded a track for the compilation album City on a Hill with Peter Furler as lead vocalist. This release would take a Dove award for "Special Event Album" in 2001, although by that time the band would bear no resemblance to the one which recorded it.

Sonicflood dissolved throughout the year 2000, citing differences over the vision of the band. Issues that led to the band dissolving included whether the band should return to a more conventional musical strain or continue making praise and worship music and how the band should sound. These were complicated by the fact that the band had no true leadership; the original arrangement was equal ownership for each member. In a corporate fashion, this meant that each one had equal say in the direction of the band. By the fall of that year, all members except Heil had departed. Heil took the role of lead singer and began recruiting new members to fill the band's touring obligations and continue making praise and worship music.

By spring 2001, Sonicflood had gone Gold and the legal complexities that surrounded the band's name and ownership had been resolved. Sonicpraise, the live album recorded in 1999, was finally released. Similar to their eponymous album, it featured a mix of songs from that Sonicflood and new covers written by other praise artists. This album earned a Grammy nomination for "Best Gospel Rock Album", and the band was on Billboard charts once again.

=== Under Rick Heil ===
With Heil at the helm, the band recruited Tom Michael, Todd Shay and Brett Vargason, each of whom were members of the John Cox Band and David "Moose" Alan, who played keyboards for Big Tent Revival. The band switched record labels, leaving Gotee and partnering with newly formed INO Records. Heil began developing a praise and worship album, designing it similarly to the band's 1999 release, with a mix of covers and original songs. The result of these efforts became Resonate, released in the fall of 2001. Their 2003 release Cry Holy takes an acoustic rock sound, drawing comparisons to Chris Tomlin.

Following the 2005 release of This Generation, the band toured internationally, recording their performances along the way. While in Muslim-dominated Turkey the band filmed a music video for their song "This Generation". Sonicflood toured with sponsorship by Compassion International in the Spring of 2006, and continued to tour in Europe in the Summer. These recordings were released as Glimpse: Live Recordings From Around The World in fall 2006. As support for Glimpse, the band embarked on a United States tour, with sponsorship from the Southern Baptist Convention's International Mission Board, and included missionaries as speakers.

In 2007, the band appeared on Trinity Broadcasting Network's Praise the Lord to promote their appearance at an upcoming World Harvest Church-sponsored event. Bandleader Rick Heil appeared again the following year, in support of A Heart Like Yours, telling the story of his healing from Crohn's disease Heil contracted the disease at the age of 11, and was afflicted with it for 26 years. Heil's case was particularly bad and, he was told, incurable, leaving his only hope for cure in miracles. While Heil does not profess to have experienced a miracle per se, he does say that "Jesus is the great physician... the healer of the heart, the soul, the mind."

The band went on to record "A Heart Like Yours" in 2008 which has a rock and piano-dominated sound. Then, in 2009 recorded a Christmas album, "When Love First Cried."

In 2009, guitarist Phil Baquie received notice of his military unit's activation, and orders to deploy to Afghanistan in October as part of Operation Enduring Freedom. Though not yet a United States citizen, Baquie is in the military reserve, which is a possible path to citizenship. Baquie's final album appearance was on their 2009 Christmas album, When Love First Cried.

== Members ==
=== Current members ===
- Rick Heil – lead vocals, guitar (2000–present (formerly bass guitar with Big Tent Revival)
- Ron Robinson – lead guitar, vocals, band music director (2009–present) (formerly guitar with Everlife)
- Phil Snowden – bass guitar (2013–present)
- Chris Bevins – keyboards, vocals (2013–present) (currently keyboards/vocals and band manager with Salvador)
- Dango Cellan – drums (2016–present) (also drums with Scott Stapp, Fireflight)

=== Former members ===
Lead vocals

- Jeff Deyo (1999–2000)
- Dean Rush (2000)

Bass guitar

- Otto Price (1998–1999)
- Rick Heil (1999–2000) (switched to lead vocals exclusively)
- Tom Michael (2000–2004)
- Bryan Willard (2004–2005)
- Grant Norsworthy (2005–2007)

Drums

- Aaron Blanton (1999–2000)
- Brett Vargason (2000–2004)
- Ben Showalter (2004–2005)
- Chris Kimmerer (2006–2009)
- Chris Knight (2009–2013)
- Derek Wyatt (2013–2015) (formerly drums with Kelly Clarkson)

Keyboards

- Jason Halbert (1999–2000)
- David Alan (2000–2004) (also in Big Tent Revival)
- McKendree Tucker (2008–2009)

Guitar

- Dwayne Larring (1999–2000)
- Matthew Knabe (1999-2000)
- Todd Shay (2000–2004)
- Trey Hill (2004–2007)
- Jordan Jameson (2004–2007)
- Phil Baquie (2008–2009)

== Discography ==
=== Studio albums ===
- 1999 – Sonicflood
- 2001 – Resonate
- 2003 – Cry Holy
- 2005 – This Generation
- 2008 – A Heart Like Yours

=== Christmas albums ===
- 2009 – When Love First Cried

=== Compilation albums ===
- 2004 – Gold
- 2006 – The Early Years

=== Live albums ===
- 2001 – Sonicpraise
- 2006 – Glimpse: Live Recordings from Around the World

=== as Zilch ===
- 1997 – Platinum

== Awards and nominations ==
- 2000 – Dove Award for Praise and Worship Album: Sonicflood
- 2000 – Dove nomination for New Artist of the Year
- 2000 – Dove nomination for Rock Recorded Song Of The Year: "I Have Come to Worship"
- 2000 – Nashville Music Award nomination for Contemporary Christian Album: Sonicflood
- 2001 – Dove Award for Special Event of the Year: City on a Hill: Songs of Worship and Praise
- 2001 – Dove nomination for Song of the Year: "I Could Sing Of Your Love Forever"
- 2002 – Grammy nomination for "Best Gospel Rock Album": Sonicpraise
