= Libertad (Delirious? album) =

Compilation album by Delirious?
- Released: 16 November 2002
- Genre: Worship, Christian rock
- Length: 61:14
- Label: Furious?

Delirious? chronology
Deeper (2002)	Libertad (2002)	Touch (2002)

Professional ratings
Review scores
Source	Rating
Cross Rhythms	8/10 stars

Libertad is a compilation album by Delirious?, released in 2002. The songs on this album are all taken from the Cutting Edge albums, released in the early 1990s. Lead singer Martin Smith returned to record new vocals in Spanish for each song.

== Track listing ==
1. "Preparen el camino" (Martin Smith) – 7:05
2. "Cantaré de Tu amor por siempre" (Smith) – 4:27
3. "Tengo a Cristo" (Smith) – 4:52
4. "Grande es El Señor" (Smith) – 7:02
5. "Cantaria sin parar" (Smith) – 4:32
6. "Dios de amor" (Smith) – 2:49
7. "El mensaje de la cruz" (Smith) – 4:49
8. "Griten al norte" (Smith) – 4:15
9. "Tuyo es mi corazón" (Smith) – 5:59
10. "En el río me encuentras" (Smith) – 5:05
11. "No me avergüenzo" (Smith) – 6:30
12. "Obsesión" (Smith) – 8:41
