= Invader Volume 1 =

EP by Rapture Ruckus
- Released: 25 February 2014
- Genre: Christian hip hop, Christian electronic dance music, rap rock
- Length: 22:58
- Label: BEC

Rapture Ruckus chronology
Open Your Eyes (2011)	Invader Volume 1 (2014)

Invader Volume 1 is the fourth extended play from the New Zealand Christian hip hop band Rapture Ruckus. It released on 25 February 2014 by BEC Recordings. The EP charted at No. 61 on the Billboard 200, and it was awarded four star ratings from Indie Vision Music, Jesus Freak Hideout and New Release Tuesday, a three-and-a-half star rating from AllMusic and a three star rating from CCM Magazine.

== Background ==
The fourth extended play from the New Zealand Christian hip hop group is entitled Invader Volume 1, and it was released by BEC Recordings on 25 February 2014.

The EP was primarily written and produced by Brad Dring and longtime collaborator Geoff Duncan, with contributions from other writers and producers as noted below.

== Critical reception ==
Professional ratings
Review scores
Source	Rating
AllMusic	3.5/5 stars
CCM Magazine	3/5 stars
ChristCore	3/5 stars
The Christian Music Review Blog	3/5 stars
CM Addict	4/5 stars
Indie Vision Music	4/5 stars
Jesus Freak Hideout	4/5 stars
Jesus Wired	8/10 stars
New Release Tuesday	4/5 stars

Invader Volume 1 garnered generally positive reception from the nine music critics to review the album. At CCM Magazine, Matt Conner rated the album three stars out of five, stating that "they hit their exact target." Sarah Fine of New Release Tuesday rated the album four stars out of five, writing that the band "continues to push boundaries" on a release which "is an impressive collection of tunes well worth your time and attention." At Jesus Freak Hideout, John DiBiase rated the album four stars out of five, saying that the release "is a great new entry into the Rapture Ruckus catalog." David Jeffries of AllMusic rated the album three-and-a-half stars out of five, observing how it is "Good times, even if fans expecting the usual Ruckus are bound to be thrown." At Indie Vision Music, Sara Walz rated the album four stars out of five, calling it "A solid release." Bryce Cooley of ChristCore rated the album three stars out of five, remarking that "Even I, in my overall disdain for this album, found my head bobbing almost involuntarily." At CM Addict, David Bunce rated the album four stars out of five, noting that with this release "Rapture Ruckus is beginning to up their game." Angel Journey of Jesus Wired rated the album an eight out of ten stars, stating that "This first EP is anthem heavy, indeed, and does not fail to deliver huge tracks that are sure to get your granny fist pumping." At The Christian Music Review Blog, Dominic Marchica rated the album three stars out of five, observing that this EP "should not go unnoticed."

== Commercial performance ==
For the Billboard charting week of 22 March 2014, Invader Volume 1 was the No. 61 most sold album in the entirety of the United States via the Billboard 200 and it was the No. 6 most sold album in the Christian category by the Christian Albums charting. Also, the album was the No. 13 most sold album on the Top Rock Albums chart, and on the Alternative Albums chart it was the No. 10 most sold. The album was the No. 11 most sold on the Independent Albums chart.

== Track listing ==
Tracklist
No.	Title	Writer(s)	Length
1.	"In Crowd" (featuring Solomon "Slow Glow Activatur" Olds)	Bradley William Dring, Geoffrey Keith Duncan, Solomon Olds	3:15
2.	"Everybody Get Up"	Dring, Duncan	3:55
3.	"Head Held High"	Dring, Stephen Matthew Aiello, Tofer Brown	3:09
4.	"Invader (Part I)"	Dring	1:57
5.	"Carry Me" (featuring David Dunn)	Dring, David Dunn	4:18
6.	"In This Together" (featuring Shuree)	Dring, Duncan, Kipp Williams, Joshua David Silverberg	2:56
7.	"In Crowd [David Thulin Remix]" (featuring Solomon "Slow Glow Activatur" Olds)	Dring, Duncan, Olds	3:28
Total length:			22:58

== Chart performance ==
Chart (2014)	Peak position
US Billboard 200	61
US Top Alternative Albums (Billboard)	10
US Christian Albums (Billboard)	6
US Independent Albums (Billboard)	11
US Top Rock Albums (Billboard)	13
