= Technicolor for Industrial Films =

1949 film

- Release date: 1949

Technicolor for Industrial Films (1949) is a sponsored film about how Technicolor can be used in industrial films. The film features footage of various objects in Technicolor, showing how it can be used in filmmaking. One scene shows a bunch of everyday goods, first being shown in black-and-white, then in Technicolor.

The film is notable because it's an ephemeral film about ephemeral films, and very few ephemeral films were made about ephemeral films at the time this film was made. The film is now in the public domain.

Technicolor for Industrial Films was preserved by the Academy Film Archive in 1995.

== See also ==
- Technicolor
- Sponsored film
- Advertising
