= My Generation (disambiguation) =

"My Generation" is a song by The Who.

My Generation may also refer to:

== Film and TV ==
- My Generation (1996 film), an Italian drama by Wilma Labate
- My Generation (2000 film), an American documentary by Barbara Kopple
- My Generation (2017 film), a documentary about cultural changes in England in the 1960s
- My Generation (2010 TV series), an American mockumentary television series
- My Generation (American game show), a 1998 music game show on VH1
- My Generation (Australian game show), a 1995–1996 general knowledge trivia show

== Music ==
- My Generation (album), a 1965 album by the Who
- My Generation: The Very Best of The Who (1996)
- Sakura Gakuin 2012 Nendo: My Generation, a 2013 album by Sakura Gakuin

=== Songs ===
- "My Generation" (Limp Bizkit song) (2000)
- "My Generation" (Yui song) (2007)
- "My Generation", a 2010 song by Nas and Damian Marley from Distant Relatives
- "My Generation", a 2006 song by Starfield from Beauty in the Broken
