= This Generation (Sonicflood album) =

Studio album by Sonicflood
- Released: March 8, 2005
- Genre: Christian rock
- Length: 41:36
- Label: INO
- Producers: Dan Muckala, Jim Cooper, Marc Byrd

Sonicflood chronology
Gold (2004)	This Generation (2005)	The Early Years (2006)

Professional ratings
Review scores
Source	Rating
AllMusic	3.5/5 stars
Christian Music Today	2.5/5 stars
Cross Rhythms	7/10 stars
Jesus Freak Hideout	2/5 stars

This Generation is the fourth studio album by Sonicflood. It was released on INO Records in 2005.

== Track listing ==
No.	Title	Writer(s)	Length
1.	"This Generation"	Rick Heil	4:01
2.	"All I've Failed to Be"	Rick Heil, Bryan Willard	4:21
3.	"You Are"	Jim Cooper, Rick Heil	4:05
4.	"Everlasting"	Jess Cates, Dan Muckala	4:16
5.	"More Than Anything"	Derri Daugherty, Steve Hindalong	4:30
6.	"Prodigal"	Jim Cooper, Regie Hamm, Rick Heil, Bryan Willard	3:26
7.	"Your Love Goes On Forever"	Marc Byrd, Rick Heil, Andrew Thompson	4:41
8.	"Never Forget You"	Jim Cooper, Rick Heil	3:20
9.	"Moment of Glory"	Marc Byrd, Pete Kipley	4:25
10.	"God Is Here"	Lara Martin	4:16

== Personnel ==
Sonicflood

- Rick Heil – lead vocals, backing vocals, guitars
- Trey Hill – guitars
- Jordan Jameson – guitars
- Bryan Willard – bass
- Ben Showalter – drums

Additional musicians

- Jim Cooper – programming, backing vocals
- Dan Muckala – keyboards, acoustic piano, synthesizers, Mellotron, programming, string arrangements, backing vocals
- Marc Byrd – keyboards, acoustic guitar, electric guitar
- Chris McMurty – acoustic guitar, bass
- Alex Nifong – acoustic guitar
- Paul Moak – electric guitar
- Tony Palacios – electric guitar
- Andrew Thompson – electric guitar
- Joey Canaday – bass
- Chris Donohue – bass
- Aaron Blanton – drums
- Ken Lewis – drums, percussion
- Brandon Heath – backing vocals
- Jamie Rowe – backing vocals

== Production ==
- Marc Byrd – producer
- Jim Cooper – producer, engineer
- Dan Muckala – producer, engineer
- Skye McCaskey – engineer
- Tony Palacios – engineer, mixing
- Jordan Richter – engineer
- Jeremy Luzier – mixing
- Mike O'Connor – musical assistance
- Dana Salcedo – creative direction, stylist
- Benji Peck – art direction, design
- Michael Gomez – photography

== Charts ==
Chart	Peak position
US Top Christian Albums	30
US Heatseekers Albums	39
