= Ascend the Hill =

American worship music band

- Also known as: Ben Davis
- Origin: Tampa, Florida
- Genres: Folk rock, indie rock, worship
- Years active: 2008–2016
- Labels: Come&Live!
- Members: Joel Davis; Seth Davis; Hayden Davidson; Jonathan Thomas
- Past members: Ben Davis
- Website: ascendthehill.com

Ascend the Hill, formerly Ben Davis, are an American worship music band from Tampa, Florida. They primarily play indie folk and indie rock. The band started making music in 2008, and currently their members are vocalist and guitarist, Joel Davis, lead guitarist, Seth Davis, bassist, Hayden Davidson, and drummer, Jonathan Thomas. The band released one extended play, as Ben Davis, who was their former front-man until his departure in 2009, Ben Davis, in 2008 independently by themselves. When they signed to Come&Live! Records, they changed their name to Ascend the Hill. Their next release, a studio album, Ascend the Hill, was released in 2009. They released, another studio album, Hymns: Take the World, but Give Me Jesus, in 2010, with Come&Live! Records. The subsequent album, also released by Come&Live! Records, O Ransomed Son, came out in 2012.

== Background ==
Ascend the Hill is a worship music band from Tampa, Florida. Their current lineup consists of lead vocalist and guitarist, Joel Davis, lead guitarist, Seth Davis, bassist, Hayden Davidson, and drummer, Jonathan Thomas, with their past member being their lead singer, Ben Davis, who departed the group in 2009. In 2016, Ascend the Hill announced a final US tour beginning and ending in their hometown of Tampa, Florida.

== Music history ==
The band commenced as a musical entity in 2008, with their first release, Ben Davis, as Ben Davis, an extended play, that released Independently in 2008. They released a studio album, Ascend the Hill, on June 21, 2009, with Come&Live! Records. Their subsequent studio album, Hymns: Take the World, but Give Me Jesus, was released by Come&Live! Records, on September 14, 2010. The next album, O Ransomed Son, came out on April 17, 2012 by Come&Live! Records.

== Members ==
=== Current ===
- Joel Davis - vocals, guitar
- Seth Davis - guitar
- Hayden Davidson - bass
- Jonathan Thomas - drums

=== Former ===
- Jason Yamnitz - bass (until 2010)
- Ben Davis - vocals (until 2009)

== Discography ==
=== Studio albums ===
- Ascend the Hill (June 21, 2009, Come&Live!)
- Hymns: Take The World, But Give Me Jesus (September 14, 2010, Come&Live!)
- O Ransomed Son (April 17, 2012, Come&Live!)

=== EPs ===
- Ben Davis (2008, Independent)
