= The Lads (album) =

Studio album by The Lads
- Released: 2005
- Recorded: 2005
- Genre: Christian rock
- Label: Nourish Music

The Lads chronology
| Alive in Concert (2003) | The Lads (2005) | The All New Adventures of The Lads (2006) |

The Lads is the fifth studio release from the New Zealand Christian rock band The Lads. It is the last recorded in New Zealand before they relocated to Franklin, Tennessee, to try and promote themselves to the Christian music market of the United States.

== Track listing ==
Tracks include:

1. "Creator"
2. "Favourite Time"
3. "Coffee with Jesus"
4. "Standing in the Sun"
5. "If I Carry on this Way"
6. "Ode to Joy"
7. "Goodbye to You"
8. "Life of Mine"
9. "Elementary"
10. "I Got You"
11. "Me and Theng"
12. "I Give it All"
