= The Lions (reggae band) =

The Lions are a Los Angeles–based reggae group made up of players from other bands. The band includes Dan Ubick on guitar and various singers, including Malik Moore and Black Shakespeare.

== Discography ==
- Jungle Struttin' 2008
- This Generation 2013
- Soul Riot 2015
