= Ben Barter =

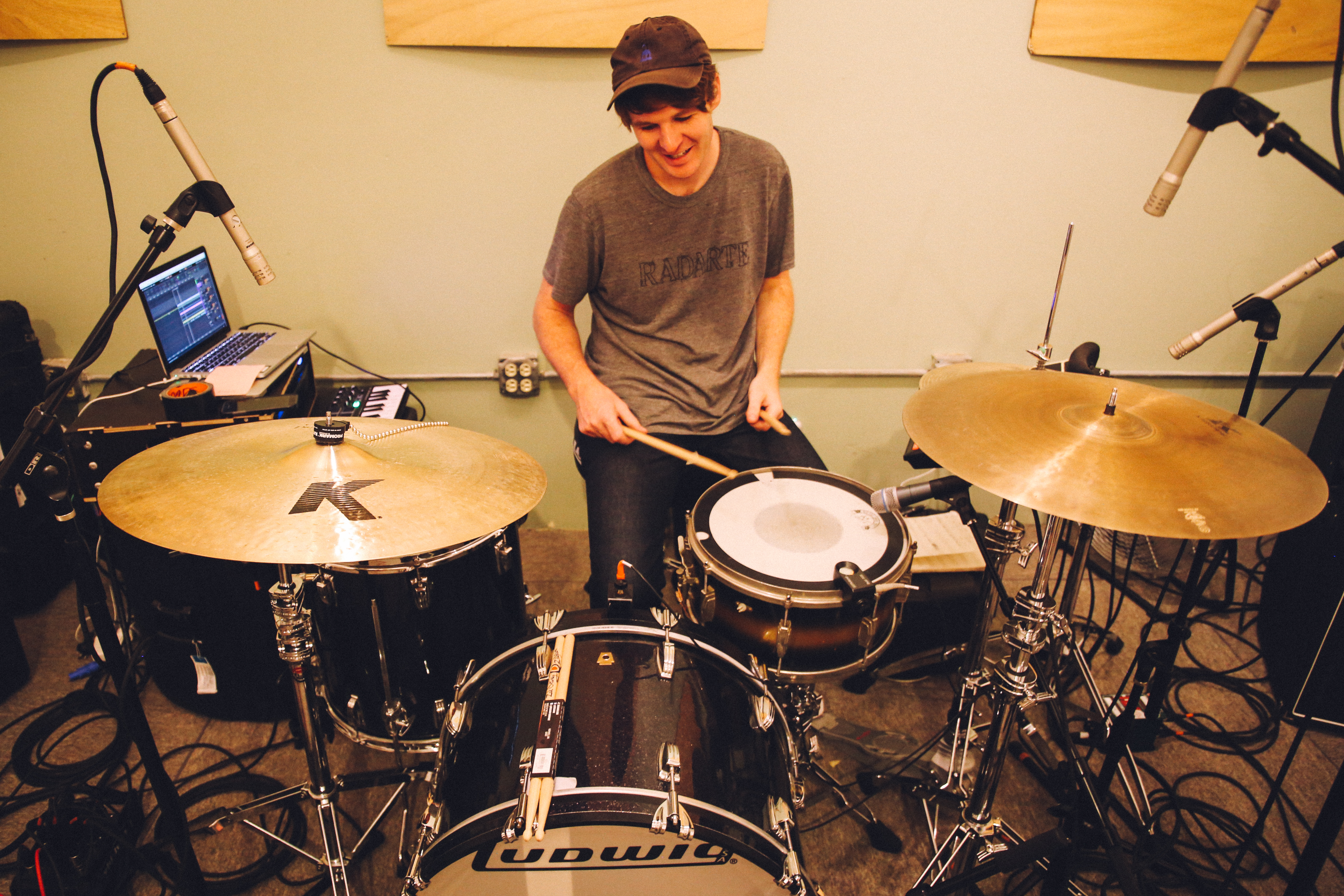

Background information
- Born: 16 October 1985 (age 41)
- Origin: Auckland, New Zealand
- Instrument: Drums

Ben Barter (born 16 October 1985) is a New Zealand drummer based in Los Angeles, CA. He is the touring drummer for Lorde and has also performed with such acts as Broods, Jarryd James, and Passion Pit. He has worked on recordings as a session drummer most notably with Grammy Award winning producer, Joel Little and three time Grammy nominated Leroy Clampitt.

== Career ==
Ben Barter began drumming for Lorde at her first public performance at Galatos' Basement in 2013. He went on to tour with her in support of the breakout Love Club EP and subsequent, highly acclaimed full-length release, Pure Heroine and Melodrama. The international tour included appearances at Coachella Valley Music and Arts Festival, Lollapalooza, Splendour in the Grass, Osheaga, as well as television performances on Ellen, Later... with Jools Holland, The Tonight Show Starring Jimmy Fallon, Late Show with David Letterman, the MTV Video Music Awards, the Billboard Music Awards, and the 56th Annual Grammy Awards where Lorde won awards for Song of the Year and Best Pop Solo Performance.

After completing the Pure Heroine tour, Barter went on to perform with Broods including an appearance on The Late Late Show with James Corden. He also toured internationally with Australian soul artist Jarryd James which included appearances at the Bonnaroo Music Festival and Lollapalooza. In 2019, he began recording and performing with LA artist Michi. Between touring, Ben does remote drum recording out of his space in Silver Lake and studio sessions for music and film around LA.

He will resume touring with Lorde for her sophomore release beginning with appearances at Coachella and Governors Ball Music Festival.

Ben Barter is known for his hybrid drumming style, mixing electronic and acoustic drums. He plays Ludwig Drums, Zildjian cymbals and sticks, and Roland electronics.

He has a solo music project called BB Normal and released his first EP in early 2020.
