= Glimpse: Live Recordings from Around the World =

Glimpse: Live

Live album by Sonicflood
- Released: October 31, 2006
- Recorded: Live at Moira, County Down, Northern Ireland: Biel, Switzerland; Chiang Mai, Thailand; Louisville, Kentucky, US
- Studio: The Clubhouse, Bletchley Park, The Smoakstack and Studio III (Nashville, Tennessee)
- Genre: Contemporary worship music, Christian rock
- Length: 50:07
- Label: INO
- Producer: Jeff Pardo

Sonicflood chronology
The Early Years (2006)	Glimpse: Live (2006)	A Heart Like Yours (2008)

Professional ratings
Review scores
Source	Rating
AllMusic	3.5/5 stars

Glimpse: Live Recordings from Around the World is Sonicflood's sixth original album and second live album. It was released on October 31, 2006.

== Track listing ==
1. "Your Love Goes On Forever" (Marc Byrd, Christine Glass-Byrd, Rick Heil, Andrew Thompson) - 4:40
2. "Open the Eyes of My Heart" (Paul Baloche) - 4:48
3. "You Are" (Chad Cates, Jim Cooper, Heil) - 4:48
4. "I Want to Know You" (Andy Park) - 4:34
5. "Resonate" (Heil, Jason Ingram) - 3:20
6. "God Is Here" (Lara Martin) - 4:21
7. "Cry Holy" (Byrd, Heil, Thompson) - 4:38
8. "Everlasting" (Jess Cates, Dan Muckala) - 4:27
9. "Lord of the Dance" (Kevin Prosch) - 5:01
10. "Infinite Love" [Studio Track] (Heil, Jeff Pardo) - 4:35
11. "Save Me" [Studio Track] (Heil, Pardo) - 3:56
12. "In Thailand" - 0:59

== Personnel ==
Sonicflood

- Rick Heil – lead vocals
- Trey Hill – guitars, backing vocals
- Jordan Jameson – guitars
- Grant Norsworthy – bass, backing vocals
- Chris Kimmerer – drums

Additional musicians

- Ian Fitchuk – keyboards
- Jeff Pardo – acoustic piano, keyboards, Hammond B3 organ, programming
- Court Clement – guitars
- Paul Moak – guitars
- Mark Polack – bass
- Garrett Buell – percussion
- George Rowe – backing vocals

== Production ==
- Rick Heil – executive producer
- Cece Noland-Heil – executive producer
- Jeff Pardo – producer, engineer, editing
- Ben Phillips – engineer, editing
- Joel "Tico" Jimenez – additional engineer
- Justin Loucks – additional engineer
- Stan Shilliday – additional engineer
- Josh Wilkinson III – additional engineer
- Josh Davis – mixing at Spaceway Studios (Dallas, Texas) (1-9)
- F. Reid Shippen – mixing (10, 11)
- Steve Lotz – mix assistant (10, 11)
- Andrew Mendelson – mastering at Georgetown Masters (Nashville, Tennessee)
- BlueMileDesign.com – design
- Jon Allen – photography
- Jonathan Kingsbury – photography
- Gladys Lim – photography
- Steve Morrow – photography
