= Jeff Deyo =

American musician (born 1969)

- Born: November 5, 1969 (age 56)
- Origin: Denver, Colorado
- Genres: CCM, worship
- Instruments: voice, piano
- Years active: 1993–present
- Labels: Gotee, Indelible Creative Group
- Formerly of: Sonicflood
- Website: jeffdeyo.com

Jeff Deyo (born November 5, 1969) is an American contemporary Christian music solo artist, professor, author, podcaster, songwriter and worship leader. He was the lead vocalist for Sonicflood with Gotee Records from its creation in 1999 through 2000, for their first two albums Sonicflood and Sonicpraise. He subsequently released several solo and band albums.

== Background ==
Deyo was the lead vocalist of contemporary worship band Sonicflood for their first two releases, Sonicflood which was a gold-selling album and produced two No. 1 Christian radio hits: "I Could Sing of Your Love Forever" and "I Want to Know You". This was followed by the live album Sonicpraise.

After leaving the group in 2000, he released a debut solo album, Saturate, in 2002 and produced a No. 1 song, "More Love, More Power", which featured supporting vocals from tobyMac. He was named one of Radio & Records magazine's Top 10 Breakthrough Artists of the Year in 2002." His second album, Light, featured another No. 1 song, "Bless the Lord", which featured vocals from Rita Springer. In 2005, Deyo released the live album, Surrender, which featured him leading worship at the 2005 Parachute music festival in New Zealand, and was his last studio album with Gotee Records. He continued to record and travel as the "lead worshiper" in the Jeff Deyo Band. Gotee Records issued a greatest hits collection, The Worship Collection, on June 19, 2007, which included songs from Sonicflood and Deyo.

He signed to Indelible Creative Group on January 22, 2007. His first studio album for the label, Unveil, was released on May 22, 2007. He appeared as the band leader, James, in the 2008 Christian film The Imposter starring Deyo, Kevin Max and Kerry Livgren.

In January 2010, Deyo joined the College of Fine Arts as part of North Central University in Minneapolis, Minnesota as a professor and faculty member in worship arts.

Jeff began his role as Lead Pastor at Trinity Church Waxahachie near Dallas, Texas in August 2025. The church is a campus of Trinity Church Cedar Hill. Previously, he served in Celebration Church in Lakeville, Minnesota.

Deyo published his first book, Awakening Pure Worship, with Destiny Image Publishers, on September 18, 2018.

He has been married since 1992 and is the father of four children.

== Discography ==
- Another Alternative (1993)
- Go the Distance (1995)
- Overflow (1998)
- Saturate (March 26, 2002)
- Light (February 10, 2004)
- Surrender (August 8, 2005) live album
- Unveil (May 22, 2007)
- The Worship Collection (June 19, 2007) greatest hits album
- Moving Mountains (August 7, 2012) worship album
- From Eternity (December 10, 2020) instrumental EP
