= Andy Park (musician) =

- Born: 1957 (age 67–68); Los Angeles, California, United States
- Genres: Contemporary worship
- Occupation(s): Musician, worship leader, author
- Labels: Vineyard Music
- Website: www.andypark.ca

Andy Park is a musician, worship leader and author who is associated with Vineyard Music. He was born in 1957 in Los Angeles, California. He studied at UCLA, earning a Bachelor of Arts.

After serving as an intern pastor in two Southern California Vineyards – West Los Angeles and Santa Barbara - he moved to British Columbia and joined the Langley Vineyard church plant at its inception in 1985. He served on the staff there for four years as an assistant pastor, majoring in worship music ministry.

Park began recording with Vineyard Music in the late 1980s. He has participated on many Vineyard recordings. In 1990, Park released his first solo project, I saw Heaven. In 2006, Park released another solo studio project, Unshakable, through ION Records (ionworship.org).

Park has been to many countries to minister including Redeemed Christian Church of God, Corner Stone Parish, Okota, Lagos, Nigeria.

Park and his wife live in Surrey, British Columbia, Canada and are the parents of eight children. As well is one of the members of Compassionart a charity founded by Martin Smith from Delirious?.

== Discography ==
=== Vineyard albums ===
- Holiness Unto The Lord
- Take Our Lives
- Devoted To You
- The River Is Here
- Blessed Be The Name
- Eternity-Acoustic Worship series
- Name Above All
- Change Me On the Inside- Vineyard Canada Compilation
- All I Need
- Free to Fly
- Winds of Worship 1
- Winds of Worship 2
- Winds of Worship 4: Live from Brighton England
- Winds of Worship 6: Live from Southern California
- Winds of Worship 7: Live from Brownsville
- Winds of Worship 9: Live from Sweden
- Winds of Worship 11: Live from Australia
- Winds of Worship 15: Live from Canada

=== Solo albums ===
- Passin' Through (1981)
- I Saw Heaven (1990)
- Night and Day (2001)
- In the Secret (2004)
- Unshakable (2007)
- Wonder Working God (2009)
- Breath of Heaven (2015)
- Still Shining (2016)
- Let Him Love You (2020)

== Bibliography ==
- Park, A., To Know You More: Cultivating the heart of a worshipper, InterVarsity Press, 2002. ISBN 0-8308-2320-4
