= The Lads =

New Zealand Christian rock-pop band

- Origin: New Zealand
- Genres: Pop; Christian rock
- Years active: 1993-present
- Members: Steve King; Mark Millard
- Past members: Paul Cotton; Bennett Knowles; Chris White; Matt Chapman; Kristian Bennett; Bjorn Bennett; Tim Smith; Elliot Richardson
- Website: theladsband.com

The Lads are a New Zealand Christian rock/pop group that was formed in 1993. In 2005, after releasing five studio albums, The Lads relocated from New Zealand to Nashville, Tennessee. In 2017, The band started a kids worship series titled Big Big Worship and have relocated back to New Zealand as of August 2018.

== History ==
The Lads are a New Zealand band that has been active since the late 1990s. The band has played at many church services, youth events, camps and high schools around Australia and New Zealand. Before moving to America, The Lads were a popular act at Parachute Music Festival and performed at each festival, except for 2006, up until 2007. In August 2010, The Lads confirmed via Facebook that they would return to New Zealand for Parachute 2011. It would be their first New Zealand concert in four years. In addition to live tours across the United States, the Lads also produce a TV show which is shown on TV stations around the world.

The show uses the band's humour to teach kids about certain principles, and episodes are based around action taking place in the band's HQ and their hangout, Murray's Milk Bar. At the end of each show, Murray offers a monologue about that week's episode, followed by a live performance by the band.

The founding members of The Lads are: Mark Millard (vocals/trombone/saxophone/drums), Steve King (drums/vocals), Chris White (keyboards/trumpet/vocals), Bennett "Ben" Knowles (bass/vocals) and Paul Cotton (guitar/vocals/songwriting). The founding members were friends as children, growing up together at the same church – Wellington South Salvation Army – in Wellington, New Zealand. All of the founding members except Paul were born and raised in New Zealand. Paul was born in Canada but moved with his family to New Zealand at the age of 12. As such, he speaks with a Canadian accent. He is also the older brother of TrueBliss singer Joe Cotton.

The band members started out writing songs for fun and became known as "Lads." This quickly changed with the success of their second album, Arbor Day. The Lads had a string of number one hits on Christian radio in Australia and New Zealand, and were invited to headline all of the major Christian festivals throughout New Zealand and Australia. During these early performances, the band had no dedicated lead vocalist. Instead, all members except Paul shared the job. Mark became the primary lead vocalist by the time Lost @ Sea was released. Chris and Ben covered lead vocals occasionally. Most notably, Ben sings the song "Understand" from the Lost @ Sea album – a song which gained huge radio airplay in New Zealand and was later featured on TV show Dawson's Creek. The song "Alone" was also featured.

In 1998, The Lads' album Lost @ Sea was named best gospel album at the New Zealand music awards, and their 2001 album Marvel followed suit, taking the prize again.

Before the band recorded the album Marvel in 2001, Paul Cotton left the group to pursue a teaching career. He did, however, have some input on the writing of some of the songs on that album and continued writing for them after leaving. Rimu Tahu from the band Royal Rumble temporarily filled in as live guitarist, but Paul's permanent replacement was Matt Chapman, who only appeared on the album Marvel and later developed RSI and was replaced by Bjorn Bennett in late 2003.

After the band's self-titled sixth album, The Lads their focus began to shift towards a younger age group. Their aim, after a few trips to the US to tour, was to try and break into a larger market by moving to the U.S. in 2005. It was during this time that Chris and Bennett decided to leave the band and move back to New Zealand. Chris later became a Campus pastor for Arise Church. Bjorn's older brother Kristian filled in on bass for early performances after the move to the U.S. but has not been formally replaced since his departure. Instead, the band uses loops and backtracks to fill in instruments vacated by former members. Kristian now plays in a new version of Royal Rumble along with Rimu Tahu. Chris continues to have some creative and lyrical input into the band and can be seen on live footage filmed in New Zealand from the "Live at The Thunderdome" DVD. Paul has also had guest slots during performances in the band's home city of Wellington, New Zealand during tours in New Zealand.

Bjorn left the band in 2010 to pursue music with his wife Tara but can still be seen in cartoon form on promotional material and on videos displayed during live shows. He was replaced by Tim Smith. Tim can be seen on the "Live at Thunderdome" DVD and on Season 2 of "The Lads" TV show but has since left the band and returned to New Zealand. To date, he has not been formally replaced.

In 2017, Mark and Steve started a kids worship series titled Big Big Worship. As of November 2018, the series consists of three volumes, featuring songs by The Lads and three other artists: Cool Worship Kids, Hannah O, and Robotz Worship.

In 2018, after over a decade being based in Nashville, the band relocated back to New Zealand.

== Current Band Status ==
In August 2018, Mark and Steve moved back to their homeland of New Zealand after 13 years of living in the United States. They will still be creating new Big Big Worship and Lads material.

The Lads did a one off reunion gig with all of the founder members (plus Tim Smith) at Winter Vibes festival in Lower Hutt New Zealand on the 26th of August 2023.

== Band members ==
- Mark Millard – vocals
- Steve King – drums, vocals

=== Former members ===
- Paul Cotton – Original Guitarist
- Bennett Knowles – Original Bass player
- Chris White – Original (and only) keyboardist
- Rimu Tahu (Royal Rumble) – Briefly replaced Paul Cotton for NZ Tour.
- Matt Chapman – Guitarist replacing Paul.
- Kristian Bennett – Bass, replacing Bennett. (Bjorn's older brother)
- Bjorn Bennett – Guitarist replacing Matt Chapman
- Tim Smith – Guitarist replacing Bjorn Bennett
- Elliot Richardson- Tour guitarist for Live at Thunder dome DVD (only member not from New Zealand)

== Discography ==
Date of Release	Title	Label	Charted	Certification	Catalog Number
Albums
1993	P.I.R.A.W. (People I Regularly Associate With)§	Lads Ministries	-	-	
1996	Arbor Day	Parachute Records	-	-	
1998	Lost @ Sea	Parachute Records	-	-	
2001	Marvel	Parachute Records	-	-	
2003	Alive in Concert	Parachute Records	-	-	
2005	The Lads	Nourish Music	-	-	
2006	The All New Adventures of The Lads	Lads Music	-	-	
2007	Live!	Lads Music	-	-	
2007	Creator	Lads Music	-	-	
2007	Whoa!	Lads Music	-	-	
2008	Secrets of the Universe	Lads Music	-	-	
2009	The Lads	Pure Blue Records			
2012	Songs from Lads TV		-	-	
2013	Welcome to Our Show		-	-	

§Only 2000 tapes were ever made of P.I.R.A.W and is somewhat of a collector's item for fans.

=== DVDs ===
In 2005, the band released a live DVD called Alive in Brisbane.

In 2011, the band released Live at the Thunderdome, a Lads TV special DVD with an extended episode intermixed with live performances from their 2011 Parachute Music Festival performance in New Zealand
