= Easterfest =

Music festival in Toowoomba, Australia

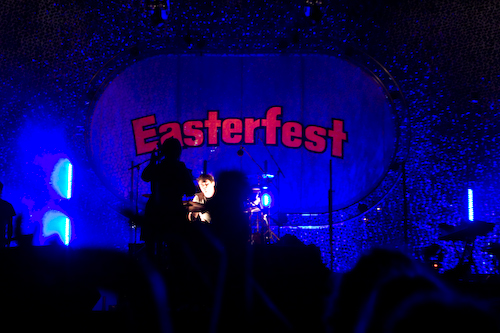
Easterfest mainstage

Easterfest (previously known as the Australian Gospel Music Festival) was an annual three-day music festival held in Toowoomba, Australia.

The first festival was held in 1999, with a mixture of successful and unsuccessful events. In 2001, the festival re-focused by holding most events in Queen’s Park (previously, events were held in multiple venues throughout the city). Since the initial move to Queen’s Park, the festival has grown and moved back to multiple venues, including the streets.

During the Easter weekend, most of Queen’s Park and some of Toowoomba's CBD was converted into an event precinct, with venue and residential tents, stages and other attractions. During the event setup and packdown, most of Queen's Park was inaccessible to the general public.

In May 2015, it was announced that Easterfest would not be continuing in 2016.

== Festival History ==
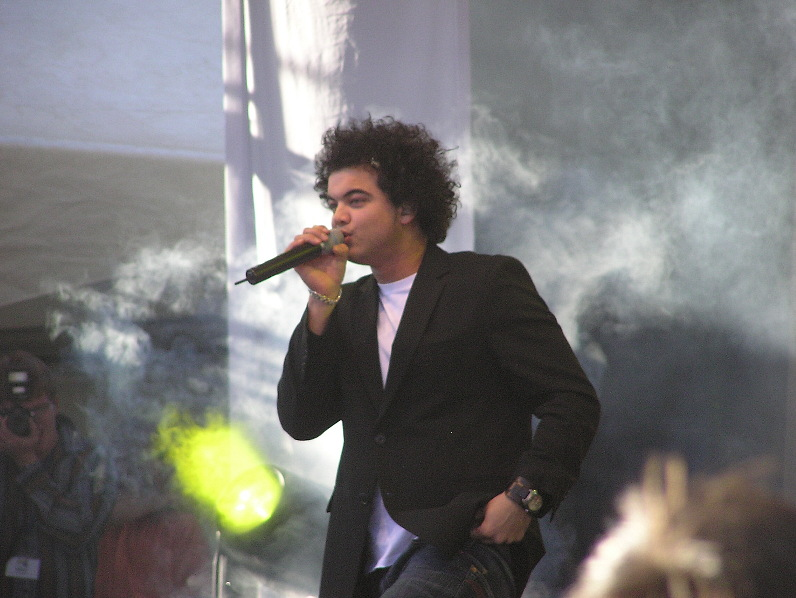
Guy Sebastian performs on Mainstage in 2004 before a crowd of 10,000

Tens of thousands of people attended the ticketed and free events during three-day festival in 2005, and over 20,000 tickets were allegedly sold in 2006. In 2009, about 40,000 people attended.

In 2011, Easterfest announced late Saturday night that the program in the main venue, Queens Park, had been cancelled. The creek running right alongside the entrance to the Queen's Park venue, which had been the scene of major flooding earlier this year, became a raging river, making for a precarious exit. Organisers confirmed the tent had partially collapsed but there were no injuries and everyone had been accounted for. Police were closing off roads as the torrential rain turned roads into rapids. Numerous cars were abandoned after they stalled. Ricky Robinson, 18, of Petrie, who was camping at the site said it was like a small river going through the area. The water was up to patron’s knees in the moshpit as the US band Switchfoot played on, despite the deluge. The lead singer Jon Foreman was climbing up the support structures for the giant display screens. "He was crazy. He was drenched pretty much" Ricky said. Thousands of people were scrambling through rushing water as they exited Easterfest. Security staff and volunteers first advised people to head to the Big Top but that too was being flooded so many just headed across East Creek to the city and higher ground. Police and fire sirens only added to the drama.

In 2012, 20,000 were drawn to the festival. "The noise created by crowds and thumping bass at Easterfest has become one of Toowoomba’s most debated issues. Kevin Farmer, a local resident stated, "The city is split down the middle between those who love the music festival and its inner-city location and those who want it moved". Co-ordinator Mr Schenk said: "We did have at least one breach and worked closely with council to get the noise within the prescribed limit. The biggest challenge came on Saturday night when we had three or four of our venues operating at the same time after 10pm, when the limits drop. Any one stage was okay, but cumulatively they were over the limit." Residents have established their own messageboard to publish their grievances. In the wake of the growing popularity of the festival residents have begun to question the publicly stated financial standing of the festival. The festival collects publicly funded subsidies which local government councillors say the festival would not be possible without. Despite more than 20,000 visitors attending the event in 2012, Easterfest was not as financially successful as expected.
