= Parachute music festival =

Parachute Music Festival
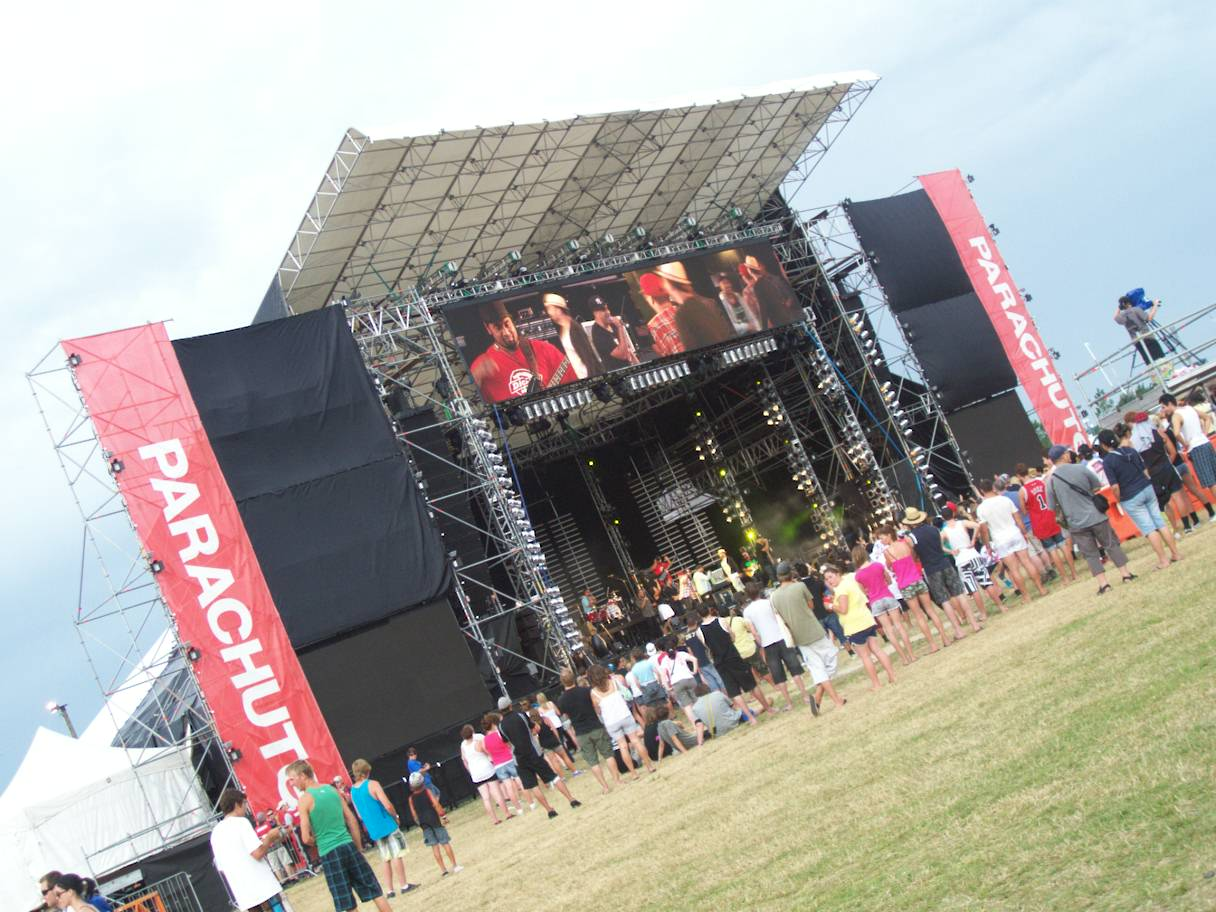
- Parachute 2010 Mainstage in the late afternoon before headliners at night

Background information
- Origin: 1992 - 1994: El Rancho Christian Camp, Waikanae, New Zealand. 1995 - 2003: Totara Springs Camp, Matamata, New Zealand. 2004 - 2014: Mystery Creek Events Centre, Hamilton, New Zealand.
- Years active: 1992-2014
- Label: Parachute Music

Parachute Music Festival was a Christian music festival held annually in New Zealand between 1992 - 2014. Originally starting in Waikanae, the event moved to Matamata in 1995, and then finally to Mystery Creek Events Centre, Hamilton, New Zealand where it was held from 2004 - 2014. The three-day festival was run by Parachute Music, and ran annually in late January, on the weekend before Auckland Anniversary Day. The event was one of the largest Christian music festivals outside of the United States and it was one of the largest multi-day festivals in the Southern Hemisphere. As well as musicians, it also featured guest speakers.

== About ==
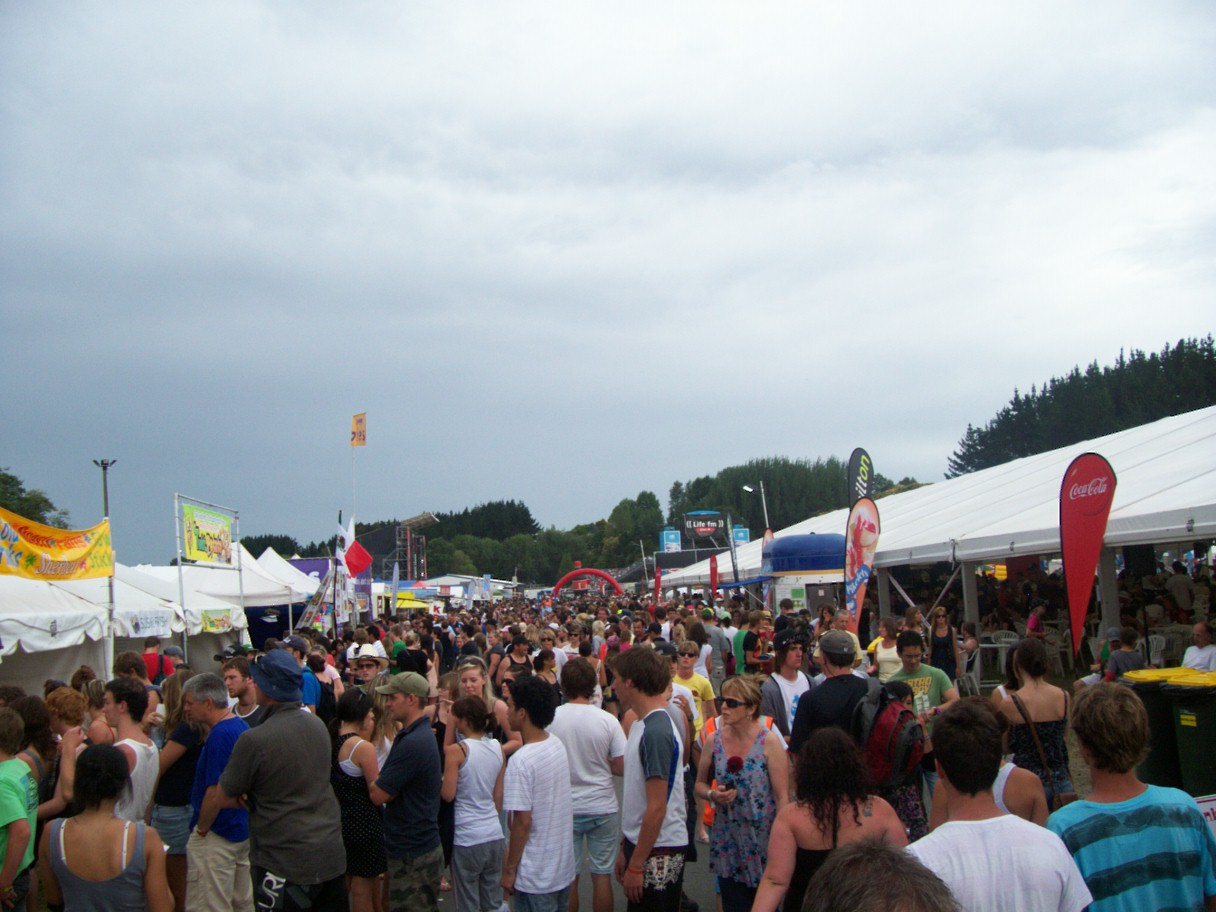
The Lunch crowd in the Village food stall area.

Parachute Music Festival attracted around 25,000 people each year. The largest crowd came in 2007, with 27,813 attendees. Most people who attended stayed on-site in tents and caravans, and a large village area supplied food, amenities and band merchandise.

Each year artists applied to play at Parachute which gave an opportunity for musicians to have their music heard by a large audience at a popular event. While many local bands from New Zealand applied, Parachute received applications from all over the world. Parachute Music also invited a number of headline artists each year to perform at the festival. Around 100 bands from many different genres played at Parachute each year.

The festival was aimed at a wide demographic ranging from families to teenagers. It is classified as a non-denominational Christian event, with enforced bans on drugs or alcohol and unmarried couples being discouraged from tenting together. However, a large number of non-Christian people did attend. Because Parachute was a non-denominational Christian festival, events such as Catholic Mass and Anglican Eucharist were often included in the festival programme.

The Festival was covered by most New Zealand media and was a well known event of the New Zealand summer. It was also supported by and had partnerships with a number of businesses and organisations - Some examples are Coca-Cola, Sanitarium, V, Pepsi, Vodafone and The NZ Police.

Parachute often partnered with charities such as World Vision. Parachute Music worked with World Vision from 2006 until its final year to sponsor a village in Rwanda called Tubehoneza. Over the last six festivals, festival-goers donated $303,000 to the area. This money was used to build five water tanks, three classrooms, a maternity unit and a health centre for Tubehoneza. In addition, 1,900 children were sponsored through the festival.

== History ==
In 1992, the first 'Parachute Music Festival' was staged at El Rancho Christian Holiday Camp, Waikanae. In 1995, the festival moved north to a larger venue at Totara Springs Christian Centre, Matamata. The last move was in 2004 to the Mystery Creek Events Centre, just outside Hamilton. The festival remained at Mystery Creek until 2014.

In 2010, Parachute Festival celebrated its 20th birthday with a large party at the Mainstage and a fireworks display.

Parachute saw that families were unable to attend the festival due to a tough financial climate and introduced the 'Pay What You Can Afford' initiative for the 2012 festival where punters were able to pay for a family pass and choose from a price as low as $1. A similar programme under the same name was introduced for the 2013 festival where people were able to donate money to a 'Pay What You Can Afford' account and for every $200 raised, a family were able to attend the festival for free.

Mystery Creek Events Centre began a long-term major redevelopment in 2012, which limited gate access and venue space available for the festival. For the first time in the festival's history, ticket numbers were capped at 17,500 weekend passes and 1,500 day passes. After launching a festival app for Android and Apple devices in 2012, Parachute Festival also adopted technology allowing punters to pay for food and services at the festival using their wristband instead of using cash or cards in 2013.

Parachute also restructured the festival in 2013 to run as a three-day (rather than four day) event. This meant that nothing was programmed after midnight on Sunday, but festival-goers were able to leave at their leisure on Monday. In the same year, Parachute became New Zealand's longest running festival, having been running its festival annually for 23 years.

On March 27, 2014, Parachute Music released a statement on its Facebook and its website announcing that Parachute Music Festival would no longer be running. The closing set at the final Parachute Festival was performed by local metalcore/hardcore band East of Eden.

== Headline acts ==
Although Parachute Festival was established in 1992, the first international headliner acts performed in 1995.

- 1995: dc talk
- 1996: Newsboys
- 1997: Newsboys
- 1998: Jars of Clay, All Star United, Margaret Becker, MIC
- 1999: Delirious?, All Star United, Five Iron Frenzy, JC Culture
- 2000: Delirious?, Mike Tait, Pete Stewart, MIC
- 2001: Third Day, Audio Adrenaline, Earthsuit, Newsboys, Raze
- 2002: Delirious?, Patriot, The O.C. Supertones, Paul Colman Trio, Earthsuit, Skillet
- 2003: TobyMac, Out of Eden, Superchick, Andy Hunter, Tree63, Pillar
- 2004: Newsboys, Relient K, Christafari, The Tribe (Formally The World Wide Message Tribe), Pillar, Paul Colman Trio, Magnify, Darlene Zschech, Hillsong United
- 2005: Third Day, Audio Adrenaline, Grits, Day of Fire, Shawn McDonald, Hillsong United, Ben Lummis, Magnify, Jeff Deyo (formerly of SONICFLOOd)
- 2006: Anberlin, Delirious?, Day of Fire, The Valley, Planetshakers, Reuben Morgan & Band
- 2007: Third Day, Thousand Foot Krutch, Rebecca St James, Shawn McDonald, Darlene Zschech, Dave Dobbyn, Falling Up, Run Kid Run, The Valley, Spacifix, Nesian Mystik
- 2008: Switchfoot, Israel Houghton & New Breed, Leigh Nash, RED, Jonezetta
- 2009: Family Force 5, David Crowder Band, Casting Crowns, Parachute Band, Kutless, Rapture Ruckus
- 2010: Switchfoot, Underoath, Hillsong United, Leeland, Family Force 5, Newworldson, Falling Up, Manafest, Parachute Band, Rapture Ruckus
- 2011: Chris Tomlin, Skillet, Brian 'Head' Welch, Newworldson, Stan Walker, Seabird, Parachute Band, Rapture Ruckus, Manafest, Elemeno P
- 2012: Casting Crowns, Parachute Band, Relient K, The Almost, Desperation Band, Showbread, The Rocket Summer, Ascend the Hill, Randy Stonehill, Avalanche City, The Chariot, Aaron Gillespie
- 2013: Newsboys, Switchfoot, Hillsong United, Family Force 5, Lecrae, Evermore, Oh Sleeper, Rapture Ruckus, Sleeping Giant, Mumsdollar, Parachute Band, Half Noise, Leeland, White Collar Sideshow.
- 2014: Dave Dobbyn, The Devil Wears Prada, Gungor, Newworldson, MxPx, Paper Route, Ruby Frost, Titanium, Half Noise, Vince Harder, MC Jin, Guvna B, Moorhouse, Stan Walker, John Mark McMillan, Kye Kye, Ascend the Hill, Aaron Gillespie, Listener, Benny Tipene, Tigertown, Steve Apirana, Paul Colman and Jireh, featuring Ginny Blackmore, Vince Harder, and Turanga Merito.

Popular local bands have played Parachute as 'local Headliners.' In past festivals the line up has included the likes of Krusty, Soda, Wash, Somersault, Toast, Obadiah and the Minor Prophets, Elephant, The Kumquats, Detour (180), Derek Lind, Mumsdollar, Steriogram, The Lads, Brooke Fraser, juliagrace, Kingston, Ruby Frost, Late 80's Mercedes, The Glory Sea, and many others. Often Australian bands were put on the 'local Headliner' list.

In mid-2012, Parachute Music ran a competition to find a local band that would open the 2013 festival. A judging panel chose five bands that had entered and the decision was left to be made by public vote. The winner of this competition was hardcore band Saving Grace, from Gisborne. Saving Grace was the first to play on Parachute's Mainstage for the 23rd festival.

Representing dance and electronic music over the years have been DJs and MCs including Andy Hunter, Tim Richards, Andy Pulzar, Dr Siminz, Paul Spain/MC Preacher Boy and DJ U-gene. In 2013 Parachute introduced the 'Rewired Dance Parties' to the Palladium stage. These dance parties include DJ sets from festival headliners.

=== Cancellations ===
- Hawk Nelson were scheduled to play in 2007 and 2008 but double bookings prevented them from making it.
- Flyleaf were scheduled to play in 2011 but due to a band member's pregnancy, they had to pull out of the festival. Elemeno P replaced Flyleaf which caused some controversy over Elemeno P not being 'Christian' enough.

== Other attractions ==
In addition to the musical acts and speakers, organisers offered a wide variety of events and attractions at the festival, including:

- Amusement rides, inflatables and carnival games
- Water slide
- Paintball
- Kids programme
- Skatepark
- 'The Village', a large outdoor market space housing food trucks and eateries, a book store, album/book signings, a general store and more.
- Punters vs. international artist competitions, such as cook-offs, volleyball, cricket and more.
- Parachute's Got Talent competition.
- Themed parties, which changed each year. For example: An 80s party, barn dance, silent disco, and roller disco.
- Noise, a collection of seminars and workshops designed to help up-skill musicians. International and local artists would share from their experiences of making music and performing, and there were also technical seminars focussed on production and practical skills.
- Movie screenings and film festivals.

== Stages ==
There were a number of stages running simultaneous performances across the festival site. Each stage at Parachute Festival had a different 'feel' and environment, and sometimes the stages were set for certain genres of music. The 2014 stages were:

- Mainstage
- The Palladium
- Deluxe
- Massive
- White Elephant

=== Other venues ===
- The Seminar Space, which held seminars and speaker segments. This was also the venue which held events such as Catholic mass.
- Noise Venue, which hosted Parachute Music's Noise programme, aimed at developing Christian artists.
- The Village Stage, an acoustic stage in the heart of the main Parachute shopping and food area.

=== Former stages ===
Parachute Festival's Mainstage in 2007

The Mainstage used from 2009 to 2011 was, at the time, New Zealand's largest concert stage. The 2012 festival saw a refreshed version of the mainstage used at previous festivals.

At one point, Parachute Festival had up to nine stages running simultaneously. Notable former stages include:

- The Debut Stage, which featured emerging artists. In 2010 the Debut Stage was replaced and changed to The Apollo.
- The Dome, which was demolished by Mystery Creek Events Centre in 2010.
- Massive, which primarily hosted dance crews, R&B and hip-hop artists. Massive was integrated into the Palladium stage programme in 2012, and then returned on 2014.
- The Hangar/White Elephant hosted indie and acoustic performances and was integrated into the Deluxe stage programme in 2012.
- The Cage which had the largest indoor stage when the festival was hosted at Totara Springs.

Various other stages have appeared at festival in the past.

At the 2000 and 2001 Parachute Festivals, there was also a separate 'festival within a festival' dedicated to electronic and dance music in its various forms. This N'Dorphin Village was created by members of Dance Generation and featured continuous DJing and live electronica acts, along with urban dance culture elements such as break dancing performances and live Hip Hop.

== See also ==
- Parachute Music Festival Compilation CDs
