= Parachute Band =

New Zealand Christian worship band

- Origin: Auckland, New Zealand
- Genres: Worship, Christian pop
- Years active: 1995–2013
- Labels: Parachute, Integrity
- Members: Sam de Jong; Jeremy Gregory; Callum Galloway; Elliot Francis
- Past members: Omega Levine; Simon Moore; Jeff Parsons; Alister Wood; Rhys Machell; Wayne Huirua; Libby Huirua; Chris de Jong; Julian Sylvester; Brian Platt

Parachute Band was a Christian worship band from Auckland, New Zealand, formed out of the New Zealand–based organisation Parachute Music. The band made pop/rock music and spanned over two generations of musicians.

== 1995–2006 ==
The first Parachute Band line-up was formed in 1995 to lead worship at Parachute Festival. Parachute Band began recording New Zealand–written contemporary worship music, performing it both in New Zealand and worldwide.

The original line-up, led by Wayne Huirua, Libby Huirua and Chris de Jong, released seven studio albums, toured extensively in the U.S., won numerous New Zealand Music Awards for Best Gospel/Christian Album, and won the Gospel Music Association's International Achievement award (in the U.S.).

In 2006 the original members retired from the band and a generational changeover took place. This was marked by a ceremony at the 2007 Parachute Festival.

== 2006–2013 ==
The second generation Parachute Band (formerly known as Victor Rose) released four studio albums; Roadmaps and Revelations (September 2007), Technicolor (September 2008), Love Without Measure (February 2011), and Matins : Vespers (released at Parachute Festival in January 2012). The band toured the United States, Canada, Asia, South Africa, UK, Europe, New Zealand and Australia, including performances at Creation Festival, Kingdom Bound Festival and also being the house band for the annual Parachute Festival.

The band won the 2008 VNZMA Peoples Choice Awards.

Love Without Measure was the first recording that the band self-produced.

In 2012, the band announced frontman Omega would be leaving the group in order to "have more time to enjoy marriage and to invest more into his local church community."

Without Omega, Parachute Band collaborated with American Christian rock band Leeland at the 2013 Parachute Festival and The Almost frontman Aaron Gillespie in 2014 for worship sets.

== Awards and recognition ==
1995–2006

- Five gold albums in NZ
- Three NZ Music Awards (Tuis)
- Winners of 2006 GMA International Award
- All the Earth debuted at No. 12 on US Billboard Gospel Chart
- All the Earth No. 1 US Gospel radio hit single
- Over 120,000 units sold in NZ

2007–2009

- "Technicolor" debuted at No. 12 on the NZ iTunes mainstream album charts, No. 10 on the U.S. Christian/Gospel charts and No. 1 on the NZ iTunes inspirational charts.
- Parachute Band won the coveted mainstreamPeoples Choice Award at the 2008 Vodafone New Zealand Music Awards and was a finalist for the Best Gospel Album award.
- The band was a finalist at the 2009 VNZMA's, for Best Gospel/Christian Album, with its album Technicolor.

2010–2013

- The band won the 2011 VNZMA Award for Best Gospel/Christian Album with their album Love Without Measure.
- The band won the 2012 VNZMA Award for Best Gospel/Christian Album with their album Matins: Vespers.

== Discography ==
=== Albums ===
- 1997 – You Alone
- 1998 – Always and Forever
- 1999 – Adore
- 2000 – The Collection V1
- 2000 – Love
- 2000 - Love & Adore
- 2001 – Amazing
- 2003 – Glorious
- 2005 – All the Earth
- 2007 – Roadmaps and Revelations
- 2008 – Technicolor
- 2011 – Love Without Measure
- 2012 – Matins : Vespers
