= Parachute Music =

New Zealand not-for-profit music organisation

Parachute Music is a not-for-profit music organisation from New Zealand. It was formed in 1989 and runs a hub of studio facilities and artist/producer support programmes in Kingsland, Auckland. From 1992 to 2014, the organisation ran the annual Parachute Festival, which grew to become the largest Christian music festival in the Southern Hemisphere, regularly attracting an audience of 25,000+ to the four-day event. It also previously provided Artist Management services including: Parachute Records, Parachute Publishing, and artist training.

Discontinuing the festival in 2014, the organisation now runs an artist and producer community in their Kingsland HQ which includes 12 music studios and various support programmes.

== Background ==
Parachute Music was originally formed as Parachute Productions in 1989 with the goal of creating opportunities for young Christian musicians in the New Zealand music industry. Today, Parachute Music is the trading name for Parachute Arts Trust, a charitable trust registered in New Zealand since 1990.

The organisation was founded by Mark de Jong, and is overseen by a board.

== Studio Facilities ==
Parachute Studios provide a one-stop shop for musicians, with a hub of studios and songwriting spaces.

Their main studio (Studio A) features a control room, live room, and recording booth that can host anything from large-scale recording projects to live video sessions. This studio features the latest Pro Tools HDX system with Apogee converters, API 1608 console, Genelec monitoring and an extensive selection of instruments, microphones and the latest plugins.

Parachute also has 11 producer studios, which have basic recording setups for songwriting and smaller recording sessions. Most of these studios are tenanted out long-term to local music producers, and some are kept available as day-hire studios.

As a charitable trust, Parachute's studios are community-supported facilities. Their main studio was built after a fundraising effort from the artist community in 2012. Their studios are offered at a subsidised rate, with many of them tenanted by notable New Zealand producers and songwriters.

== Artist Development ==
Since 2013, Parachute Music has run a development programme for young artists. Parachute handpicks a small group of high-potential artists each year to complete this programme, with the aim of giving them a solid foundation to develop a career in the music industry. The programme is open to New Zealand musicians between the ages of 18 and 25.

== Community Care ==
Since 2017, Parachute Music has employed Community Care staff to offer dedicated and bespoke support to artists, producers, and songwriters in their community and the wider New Zealand music industry.

== Music Production ==
Parachute Music also offers commercial music services to a range of clients, co-ordinating the production of tracks for various projects; including jingles for media companies, and music made for television shows.

== Founders ==
In 2010, Parachute founders Mark and Chris de Jong were each awarded a Queen's Service Medal for services to music.
