= Daniel Bedingfield discography =

- Bedingfield performing in 2007
- Studio albums: 2
- Extended plays: 2
- Singles: 19

English-New Zealand singer Daniel Bedingfield has released two studio albums, nineteen singles and two EPs.

== Studio albums ==
List of albums, with selected chart positions and certifications
Title	Details	Peak chart positions										Certifications
Title	Details	UK	AUS	DEN	FRA	IRE	NL	NZ	NOR	SWI	US	Certifications
Gotta Get thru This	Released: 27 August 2002; Label: Polydor; Formats: CD, digital download	2	39	3	—	14	23	19	25	—	41	BPI: 5× Platinum; RIAA: Gold; RMNZ: Gold
Second First Impression	Released: 8 November 2004; Label: Polydor; Formats: CD, digital download	8	—	—	83	65	99	—	—	88	—	BPI: Gold
"—" denotes a recording that did not chart or was not released in that territory.

== EPs ==
List of EPs, with selected chart positions
Title	Details	Peak chart positions
Title	Details	NZ
Stop the Traffik – Secret Fear	Released: 24 April 2012; Label: UHT Productions; Formats: CD, digital download	33
Rocks Off Remixes	Released: 21 August 2012; Label: UHT Productions; Formats: CD, digital download	—
"—" denotes a recording that did not chart or was not released in that territory.

== Singles ==
=== As lead artist ===
List of singles, with selected chart positions and certifications, showing year released and album name
Title	Year	Peak chart positions										Certifications	Album
Title	Year	UK	AUS	DEN	FRA	GER	IRE	NL	NZ	NOR	US	Certifications	Album
"Gotta Get thru This"	2001	1	10	14	49	72	15	14	12	—	10	BPI: 2× Platinum; ARIA: Gold	Gotta Get thru This
"James Dean (I Wanna Know)"	2002	4	20	—	—	—	36	—	23	—	— (Note: "James Dean (I Wanna Know)" did not enter the US Billboard Hot 100 but peaked at number 36 on the US Mainstream Top 40.)		Gotta Get thru This
"If You're Not the One"	2002	1	14	1	18	38	2	11	2	4	15	BPI: Platinum; ARIA: Gold; IFPI NOR: Platinum	Gotta Get thru This
"I Can't Read You"	2003	6	—	—	—	—	34	93	—	—	—		Gotta Get thru This
"Never Gonna Leave Your Side"	2003	1	30	15	—	—	11	17	13	19	—		Gotta Get thru This
"Friday"	2003	28	—	—	—	—	49	—	—	—	—		Gotta Get thru This
"Nothing Hurts Like Love"	2004	3	—	7	—	—	30	—	—	—	—		Second First Impression
"Wrap My Words Around You"	2005	12	—	—	—	—	30	80	—	—	—		Second First Impression
"The Way"	2005	41	—	—	—	—	—	—	—	—	—		Second First Impression
"Rocks Off"	2012	—	—	—	—	—	—	—	—	—	—		Stop the Traffik – Secret Fear
"Don't Write Me Off"	2013	—	—	—	—	—	—	—	—	—	—		Stop the Traffik – Secret Fear
"Spotlight" (with Hermitude)	2020	—	—	—	—	—	—	—	—	—	—		Non-album singles
"Get Some" (with Thys)	2025	—	—	—	—	—	—	—	—	—	—		Non-album singles
"Believer" (with Aktive)	2025	—	—	—	—	—	—	—	—	—	—		Non-album singles
"Leave Right Now" (with Surya Sen & niceboy)	2026	—	—	—	—	—	—	—	—	—	—		Non-album singles
"—" denotes a recording that did not chart or was not released in that territory.

=== As featured artist ===
List of singles, with selected chart positions, showing year released and album name
Title	Year	Peak chart positions			Album
Title	Year	FRA	NL	NZ	Album
"Do Ya" (Lionel Richie featuring Daniel Bedingfield)	2004	—	—	—	Just for You
"The One" (Sharam featuring Daniel Bedingfield)	2008	27	28	—	—N/a
"If Our Love Was a Song" (Scratch featuring Daniel Bedingfield)	2009	—	—	—	Loss 4 Wordz
"Party Bot" (Death! Death! Die! featuring Big B and Daniel Bedingfield)	2011	—	—	—	Ninja Flying Eagles 25th Anniversary Limited Edition; Remastered Re-Release
"Team, Ball, Player, Thing" (#KiwisCureBatten featuring Lorde, Kimbra, Brooke Fraser, et al.)	2015	—	—	2	—N/a

== Compilation appearances ==
List of songs, showing year released and album name
Year	Title	Album
2002	"If You're Not the One"	Maid in Manhattan: Music from the Motion Picture
2005	"If You're Not the One"	Pinoy Pop Superstar: The Finalists
2006	"If You're Not the One"	100 Essential Love Songs
2006	"If You're Not the One"	Brenan, Michael, Charmaine
2007	"If You're Not the One"	Love Songs #1's
2007	"Never Gonna Leave Your Side"	Wedding Nights
2009	"James Dean (I Wanna Know)"	Summer Party
2009	"Never Gonna Leave Your Side"	Boy Crazy
2010	"Gotta Get Thru This" (radio edit)	I Am... Working Out
2010	"If You're Not the One"	I Am... Sad
2011	"Wrap My Words Around You"	This Is the Sound of... Love
2011	"Gotta Get Thru This" (radio edit)	100 Hits
2011	"Sometimes You Just Know"	Over Proof Riddim – Full Strength
2012	"Man in the Long Black Coat"	Chimes of Freedom: The Songs of Bob Dylan Honoring 50 Years of Amnesty International
2013	"If You're Not the One"	Now That's What I Call Love Songs

== Other songs ==
- "Heaven" – Daniel Bedingfield and DJ Izzy B (2000)
- "You Got Me Singing" – Daniel Bedingfield and DJ Izzy B (2000)
- "A Dream Is a Wish Your Heart Makes" – (2004) (Note: This is a cover that was featured on the album Disneymania 2.)
- "Ain't Nobody" (live at the Brits) – Natasha Bedingfield with Daniel Bedingfield (2005)
- "Everyday" – Coolooloosh featuring Daniel Bedingfield (2011)
- "Just a Party" – Daniel Bedingfield featuring Busy Signal (2012)
- "I Wanna Feel" – Secondcity (2014)
- "Call to Me" – Sharam featuring Daniel Bedingfield (2016)
- "Bubblin'" - Original Dodger (2018)
- "lovemyself" - Rock Mafia (2022)

== Songwriting credits ==
- "Back in My Life" – 2 Man Gang (2002)
- "E Z When You Want 2" – 2 Man Gang (2002)
- "Hold Me in Your Arms" – H & Claire (2002)
- "Works for Me" – David Archuleta (2008)
- "Can't Make This Over" – Pixie Lott (2009)
- "Miss You" – Pixie Lott (unreleased)
- "Get Down" – David Joseph (2011)
- "Phantom Wifey" – Rowdy Superstar (2012)
- "WAR" – Rowdy Superstar (2012)
- "When the Rain Is Gone" – Adam F (2012)
- "In Love vs. Lovin'" – Lynfield (2013)
- "Get Down" – Concept (2014)
- "I Wanna Feel" – Secondcity (2014)
- "I Did It" – Spica (2014)
- "Testify" – Ben Haenow (2015)
- "Wild Emotion" – Asta (2016)
- "Freak Like Me" – Lee Walker vs DJ Deeon featuring Katy B and MNEK (2016)
- "Work from Home" – Fifth Harmony (2016)
- "Make You Believe in Love" – Marcus & Martinus (2017)
- "Original" – Matt Terry (2017)
- "Livin' In'" - Super Junior-D&E (2018)
- "Stardust" with Cara Onofrio, Emelie Eriksson, Johan Röhr, Alex Aiono, Billy Mann
- "Hero" - Weezer (2020)

== Unreleased songs ==
- "A Thousand Life Times" (featuring Mariah Carey)
- "Bad4u"
- "Be Who You Are"
- "Body Love"
- "Borderline" (with Swimz)
- "Can't Make This Over"
- "Candy (Apple of Your Eye)"
- "Closure"
- "Coming Home" (Refs featuring Daniel Bedingfield)
- "Cums2luv" (co-written with David Dyson & Ashdunn)
- "Domestic Silence"
- "Dynamite"
- "Fallout"
- "Fire Eyes"
- "First Base"
- "Hard Stop" (with efan)
- "Heads or Tails"
- "Hiding Place" (co-written with Steven Manovski)
- "Holding On"
- "Hurt Somebody"
- "I Love You But I Need You to Leave Me" (Demo)
- "I'll Be Home"
- "I've Been Waiting" (Demo)
- "I Will Find You"
- "Intuition"
- "Imagine If It Was You"
- "Just Don't Know" (with Alvora Larsdotter & Yei Gonzalez)
- "Keep the Light On"
- "Killing Me With My Emotions"
- "Missing You First"
- "More" (Daniel Bedingfield/Thomas Ely/Dean Livermore)
- "No Letting Go"
- "Only Thing I'll Ever Know (Eric Appapoulay/Daniel Bedingfield/Andrew Kostek)
- "Out of Love"
- "Out of My Head" (written with Adam Fenton and featured in the film The Curse of Downers Grove)
- "Remember"
- "Saving Yourself for You" (Daniel Bedingfield/Thomas Ely/Dean Livermore)
- "Smile That Warms the Heart"
- "Still Wanna Mess Around"
- "Stop Wastin' Your Time" (Daniel Bedingfield/Thomas Ely/Dean Livermore)
- "Survive Without Her"
- "Take Me Away" (with Tim Myers)
- "Tell Me"
- "The Things I Say to You"
- "The World Is Burning"
- "Things We Do for Love"
- "Thinkin Bout Me" (with Baauer)
- "Tipping Point"
- "Too Hot"
- "Under For the Third Time"
- "When It Comes To Love"
- "Why Live For the Moment" (intended for Westlife)
- "Woman"
- "You Love"
- "YOY"
- ”I believe” (co written with Andy Kostek)
