= Sailing at the 1996 Summer Olympics – Women's 470 =

Sailing at the Olympics

470 Women's at the Games of the XXVI Olympiad
- 470
- Venue: Savannah
- Dates: 24 July to 1 August
- Competitors: 44 from 22 nations
- Teams: 22

Medalists
1st place, gold medalist(s)		Theresa Zabell; Begoña Vía Dufresne	Spain
2nd place, silver medalist(s)		Yumiko Shige; Alicia Kinoshita	Japan
3rd place, bronze medalist(s)		Ruslana Taran; Olena Pakholchik	Ukraine

The Women's 470 Class Competition was a sailing event on the program at the 1996 Summer Olympics that was held from 24 July to 1 August 1996 in Savannah, Georgia, United States. Points were awarded for placement in each race. Eleven races were scheduled and sailed. Each team had two discards.

== Results ==
Rank	Helmsman (Country)	Crew	Race I		Race II		Race III		Race IV		Race V		Race VI		Race VII		Race VIII		Race IX		Race X		Race XI		Total Points	Total -1
Rank	Helmsman (Country)	Crew	Rank	Points	Rank	Points	Rank	Points	Rank	Points	Rank	Points	Rank	Points	Rank	Points	Rank	Points	Rank	Points	Rank	Points	Rank	Points	Total Points	Total -1
1st place, gold medalist(s)	Theresa Zabell (ESP)	Begona Via Dufresne	4	4.0	2	2.0	~~11~~	~~11.0~~	8	8.0	2	2.0	1	1.0	3	3.0	~~10~~	~~10.0~~	3	3.0	1	1.0	1	1.0	46.0	25.0
2nd place, silver medalist(s)	Yumiko Shige (JPN)	Alicia Kinoshita	3	3.0	7	7.0	~~13~~	~~13.0~~	6	6.0	1	1.0	3	3.0	2	2.0	~~11~~	~~11.0~~	1	1.0	6	6.0	7	7.0	60.0	36.0
3rd place, bronze medalist(s)	Ruslana Taran (UKR)	Olena Pakholchik	1	1.0	5	5.0	4	4.0	9	9.0	~~12~~	~~12.0~~	8	8.0	~~18~~	~~18.0~~	1	1.0	4	4.0	4	4.0	2	2.0	68.0	38.0
4	Kris Stookey (USA)	Louise Van Voorhis	2	2.0	8	8.0	2	2.0	1	1.0	4	4.0	~~12~~	~~12.0~~	~~14~~	~~14.0~~	2	2.0	14	14.0	5	5.0	11	11.0	75.0	47.0
5	Susanne Bauckholt (GER)	Katrin Adlkofer	~~16~~	~~16.0~~	6	6.0	5	5.0	5	5.0	3	3.0	4	4.0	6	6.0	7	7.0	11	11.0	2	2.0	~~12~~	~~12.0~~	77.0	49.0
6	Susanne Ward (DEN)	Michaëla Ward-Meehan	6	6.0	3	3.0	~~15~~	~~15.0~~	2	2.0	14	14.0	2	2.0	4	4.0	12	12.0	~~18~~	~~18.0~~	7	7.0	6	6.0	89.0	56.0
7	Federica Salvà (ITA)	Emanuela Sossi	11	11.0	4	4.0	9	9.0	~~15~~	~~15.0~~	~~15~~	~~15.0~~	13	13.0	9	9.0	9	9.0	2	2.0	3	3.0	4	4.0	94.0	64.0
8	Jeni Lidgett (AUS)	Addy Bucek	7	7.0	9	9.0	7	7.0	4	4.0	~~19~~	~~19.0~~	~~16~~	~~16.0~~	15	15.0	3	3.0	5	5.0	9	9.0	5	5.0	99.0	64.0
9	Penny Davis (CAN)	Leigh Andrew-Pearson	~~PMS~~	~~23.0~~	1	1.0	3	3.0	~~20~~	~~20.0~~	6	6.0	10	10.0	5	5.0	8	8.0	19	19.0	8	8.0	16	16.0	119.0	76.0
10	Ida Andersen (NOR)	Linda Andersen	12	12.0	11	11.0	8	8.0	~~16~~	~~16.0~~	5	5.0	9	9.0	12	12.0	6	6.0	9	9.0	~~14~~	~~14.0~~	9	9.0	111.0	81.0
11	Bethan Raggatt (GBR)	Susan Carr	5	5.0	12	12.0	10	10.0	3	3.0	9	9.0	~~15~~	~~15.0~~	11	11.0	~~18~~	~~18.0~~	12	12.0	12	12.0	15	15.0	122.0	89.0
12	Shany Kedmy (ISR)	Anat Fabrikant	8	8.0	15	15.0	~~DSQ~~	~~23.0~~	7	7.0	10	10.0	14	14.0	~~DSQ~~	~~23.0~~	13	13.0	10	10.0	13	13.0	3	3.0	139.0	93.0
13	Denise Lyttle (IRL)	Louise Cole	10	10.0	10	10.0	14	14.0	13	13.0	11	11.0	~~17~~	~~17.0~~	8	8.0	5	5.0	8	8.0	16	16.0	~~19~~	~~19.0~~	131.0	95.0
14	Lena Carlsson (SWE)	Boel Bengtsson	18	18.0	17	17.0	12	12.0	11	11.0	16	16.0	7	7.0	1	1.0	~~19~~	~~19.0~~	6	6.0	~~20~~	~~20.0~~	8	8.0	135.0	96.0
15	Florence Le Brun (FRA)	Annabel Chaulvin	13	~~13.0~~	13	13.0	~~PMS~~	~~23.0~~	12	12.0	7	7.0	5	5.0	~~19~~	~~19.0~~	14	14.0	13	13.0	11	11.0	10	10.0	140.0	98.0
16	Leslie Egnot (NZL)	Jan Shearer	14	14.0	18	18.0	1	1.0	17	17.0	8	8.0	11	11.0	7	7.0	4	4.0	21	21.0	~~PMS~~	~~23.0~~	~~PMS~~	~~23.0~~	147.0	101.0
17	Aikaterini Kaloudi (GRE)	Emilia Tsoulfa	9	9.0	~~20~~	~~20.0~~	6	6.0	~~19~~	~~19.0~~	18	18.0	6	6.0	16	16.0	17	17.0	17	17.0	18	18.0	13	13.0	159.0	120.0
18	Katalin Bácsics (HUN)	Enikő Németh	17	17.0	~~19~~	~~19.0~~	~~PMS~~	~~23.0~~	10	10.0	17	17.0	18	18.0	10	10.0	16	16.0	16	16.0	10	10.0	14	14.0	170.0	128.0
19	Janja Orel (SLO)	Alenka Orel	~~20~~	~~20.0~~	21	21.0	17	17.0	14	14.0	20	20.0	19	19.0	13	13.0	~~21~~	~~21.0~~	7	7.0	15	15.0	18	18.0	185.0	143.0
20	Cheung Mei Han (HKG)	Tung Chun Mei	19	19.0	~~22~~	~~22.0~~	~~PMS~~	~~23.0~~	18	18.0	13	13.0	21	21.0	20	20.0	22	22.0	15	15.0	19	19.0	17	17.0	209.0	164.0
21	Liu Haimei (CHN)	Ji Fengqin	15	15.0	14	14.0	~~PMS~~	~~23.0~~	21	21.0	21	21.0	22	22.0	21	21.0	15	15.0	20	20.0	~~PMS~~	~~23.0~~	20	20.5	215.5	169.5
22	Paula Reinoso (ARG)	Sofía Usandizaga	~~PMS~~	~~23.0~~	16	16.0	16	16.0	~~22~~	~~22.0~~	22	22.0	20	20.0	17	17.0	20	20.0	22	22.0	17	17.0	20	20.5	215.5	170.5

=== Daily standings ===
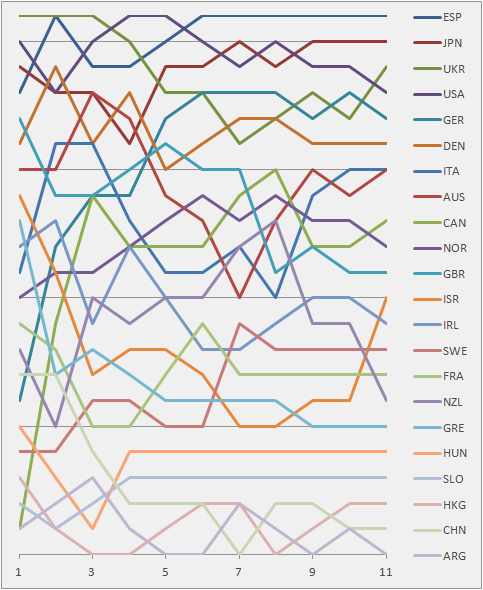
Graph showing the daily standings in the 470 women during the 1996 Summer Olympics

== Conditions at the 470 course areas ==
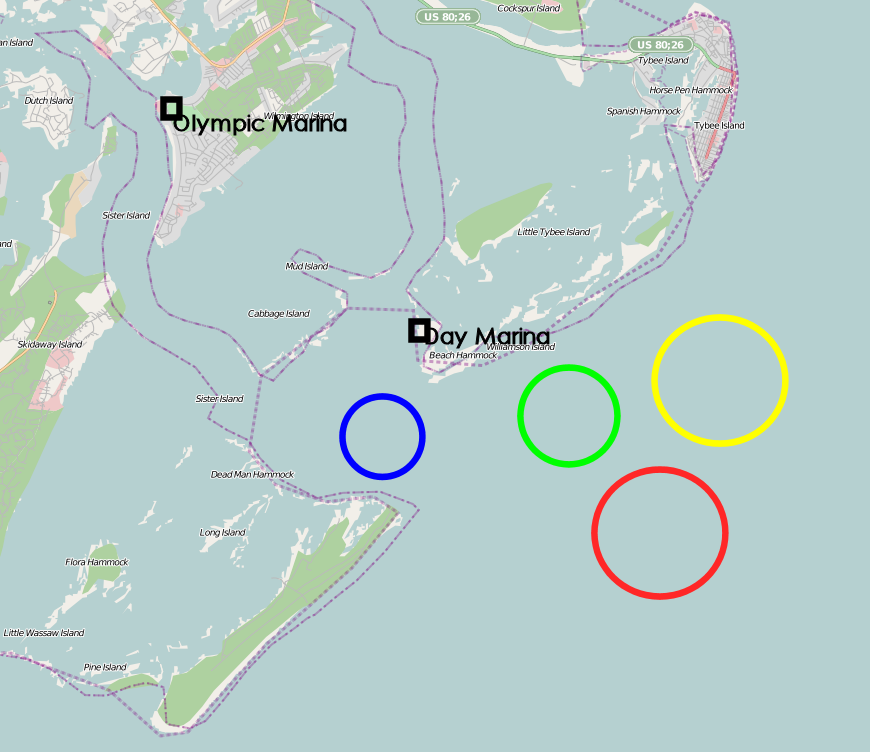
Black: Marinas
Blue: Alpha course
Green: Bravo course
Yellow: Charly course
Red: Delta course

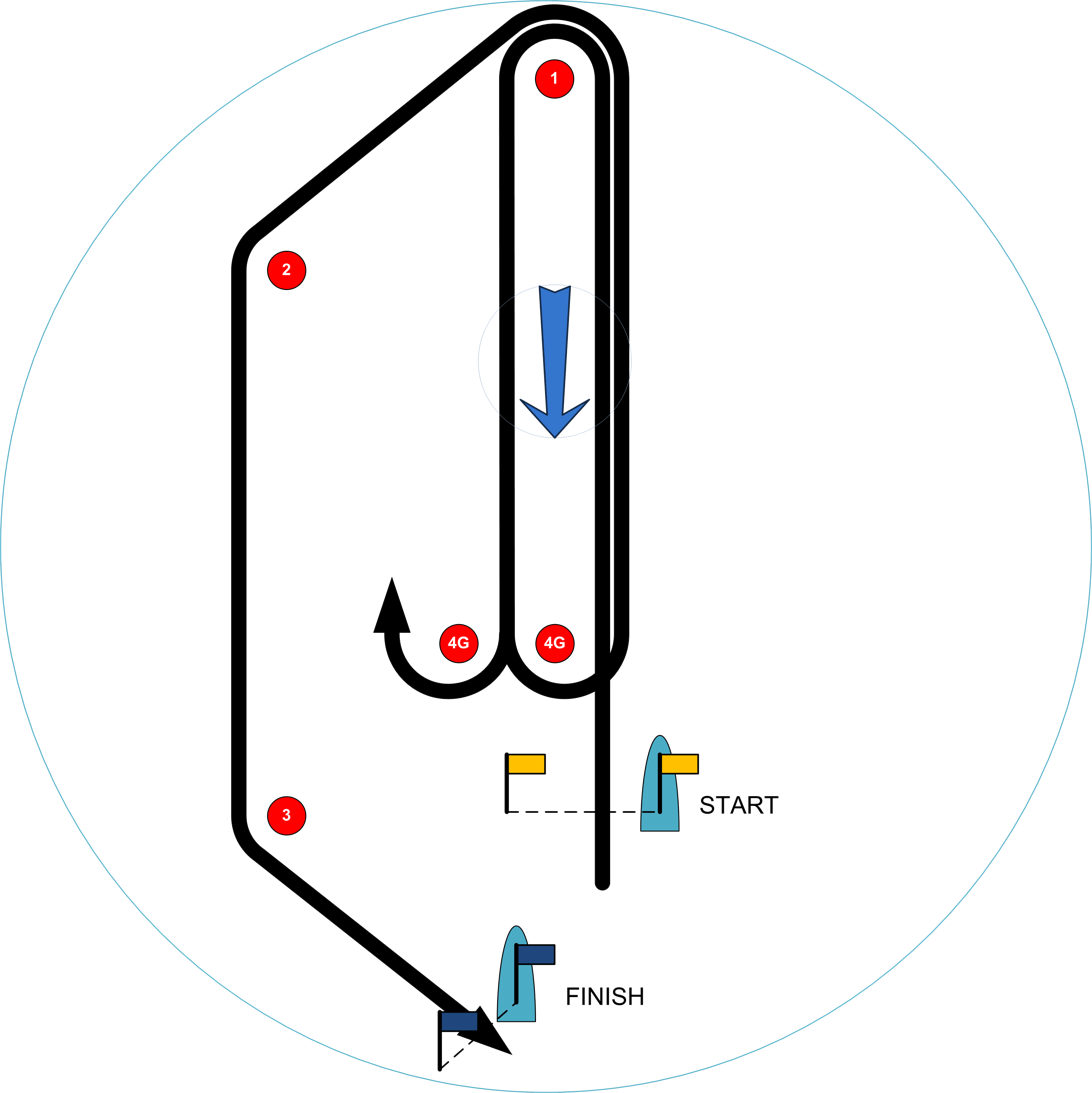
Olympic course ZI.
S(Start) - 1 - 2 - 3 - 2 - 3 - 2 - 3 - F(Finish reaching)

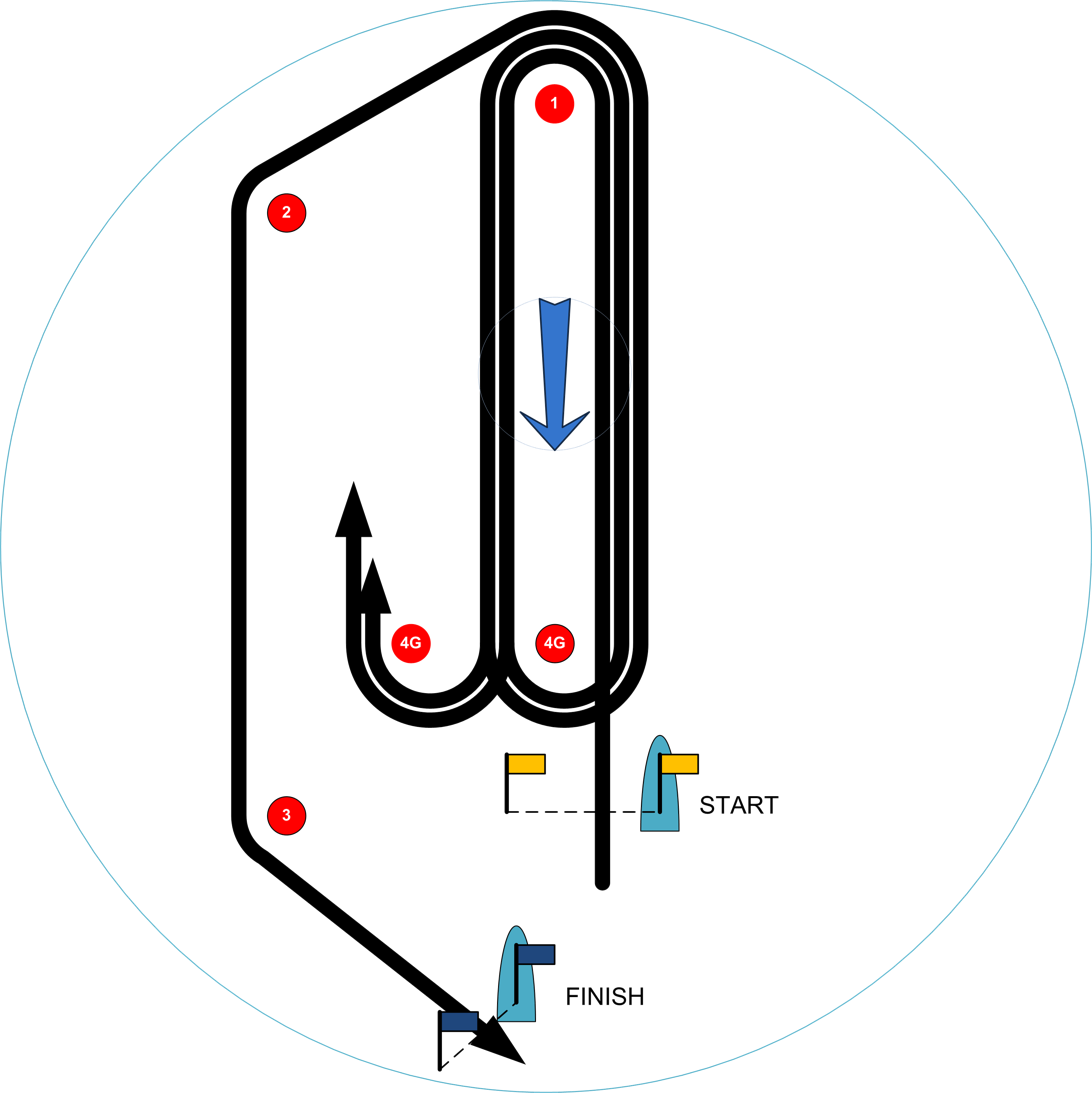
Olympic course XI.
S(Start) - 1 - 4G - 1 - 4G - 1 - 2 - 3 - F(Finish reaching)

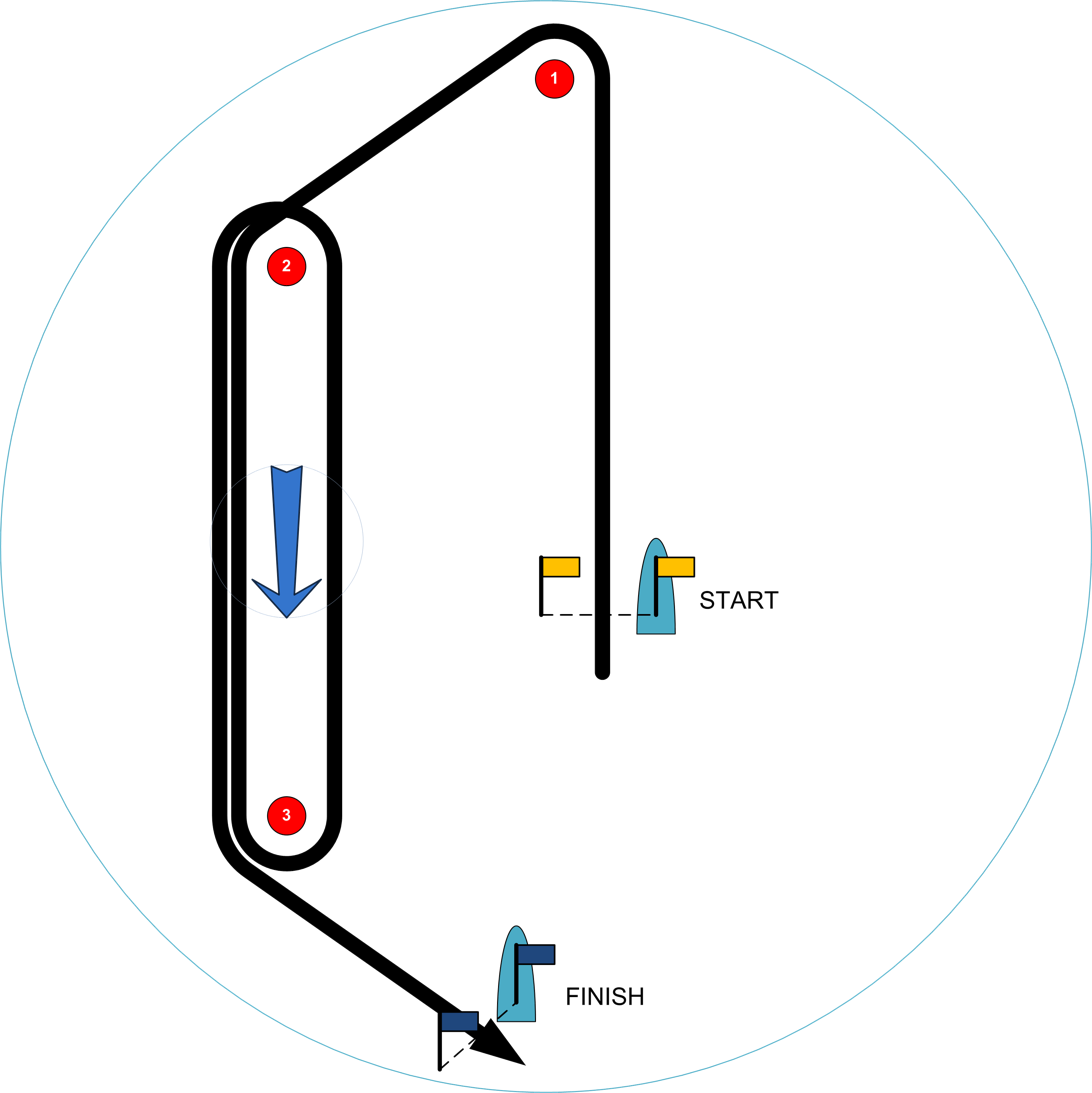
Olympic course ZO.
S(Start) - 1 - 2 - 3 - 2 - 3 - F(Finish reaching)

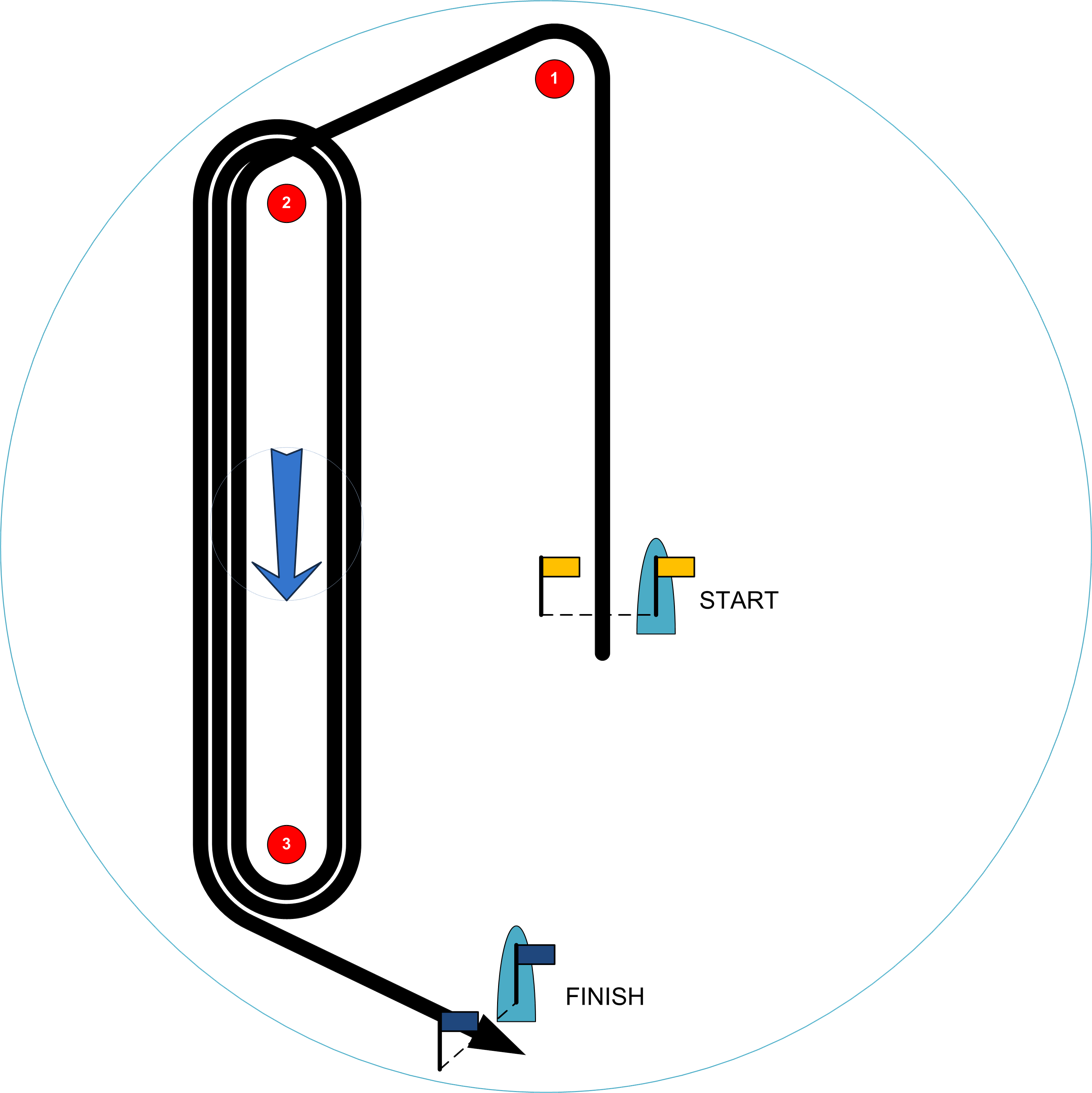
Olympic course XO.
S(Start) - 1 - 4G - 1 - 2 - 3 - F(Finish reaching)

Date	Race	°C	Knot	Meter	Course	Course area
24 July 1996	I	28	11	0.7		Charly
25 July 1996	II	29	13	0.7	XO	Charly
26 July 1996	III	28	10	0.5	ZI	Charly
26 July 1996	IV	28	10	0.5	ZI	Bravo
27 July 1996	V	28	5	0.6	ZO	Bravo
27 July 1996	VI	29	8	0.6	ZO	Bravo
28 July 1996	VII	29	6	0.7	ZI	Bravo
29 July 1996	VIII	29	14	0.5	XI	Charly
30 July 1996	IX	28	8	0.4	ZO	Charly
30 July 1996	X	28	9	0.5	ZO	Charly
1 August 1996	XI	28	7	0.5	ZO	Charly
