= Rain Down (Delirious? song) =

Single by Delirious?

from the album World Service
- Released: 29 January 2002
- Recorded: 2002
- Genre: CCM; alternative rock
- Length: 4:50
- Label: Furious?
- Songwriters: Stuart Garrard; Martin Smith
- Producer: Delirious?

Delirious? singles chronology
"Grace Like a River" (2002)	"Rain Down" (2002)	"God in Heaven" (2003)

"Rain Down" is the second track on the Christian rock band Delirious?'s fifth album, World Service, released in 2002. Written by the band's lead vocalist, Martin Smith and lead guitarist, Stuart Garrard, "Rain Down" reached number 5 on the US Hot Christian Songs chart.

== Single release ==
In 2005, as part of an extended chart campaign in Germany, Delirious? released "Rain Down" as a radio single. It followed on from the success of "Inside Outside" and "Every Little Thing", which had both reached the first and second position respectively the SWR3 charts. It charted at second in January. However, unlike the previous two releases, "Rain Down" was not made available as a CD single.

== Track listing ==
1. "Rain Down" (Audiostar radio mix)
2. "Rain Down" (album version)

== Charts ==
Chart (2012)	Peak position
US Christian AC (Billboard)	7
US Christian Airplay (Billboard)	5
US Hot Christian Songs (Billboard)	5
