= Gotta Get Thru This =

Gotta Get Thru This may refer to:

- Gotta Get Thru This (album), a 2002 album by Daniel Bedingfield
  - "Gotta Get Thru This" (song), a 2001 single and the album's title song
