= Stookey =

Stookey is a surname. Notable people with the surname include:

- Bob Stookey, a fictional character from the comic book series The Walking Dead and the television series of the same name
- Kris Stookey (born 1969), American yacht racer
- Nathaniel Stookey (born 1970), American composer
- Paul Stookey (born 1937), American folk singer-songwriter
- S. Donald Stookey (1915–2014), American engineer and the creator of CorningWare

== See also ==
- Stookey Township
- Stooky
