= Friday (Daniel Bedingfield song) =

2003 single

Single by Daniel Bedingfield

from the album Gotta Get Thru This
- Released: 20 October 2003
- Length: 3:30
- Label: Polydor
- Songwriter(s): Daniel Bedingfield
- Producer(s): Daniel Bedingfield, Al Stone

Daniel Bedingfield singles chronology
"Never Gonna Leave Your Side" (2003)	"Friday" (2003)	"Nothing Hurts Like Love" (2004)

"Friday" is the sixth and final single from British singer Daniel Bedingfield's debut album, Gotta Get Thru This (2002). It peaked at number 28 on the UK Singles Chart (his first single not to reach the top ten, as well as twenty) and number 49 on the Irish Singles Chart.

== Track listings ==
UK CD1

1. "Friday" (radio edit)
2. "James Dean (I Wanna Know)" (live Radio 2 session)
3. "Friday" (Solaris vocal edit)
4. "Friday" (video)

UK CD2

1. "Friday" (live Radio 2 session)
2. "Never Gonna Leave Your Side" (live Radio 2 session)
3. "Blown It Again" (Peggy remix)

UK cassette single

1. "Friday" (radio edit)
2. "Friday" (Roni Size mix)

== Charts ==
Chart (2003)	Peak position
Ireland (IRMA)	49
Scotland (OCC)	36
UK Singles (OCC)	28
