= Bárbara Dührkop Dührkop =

Spanish politician (born 1945)

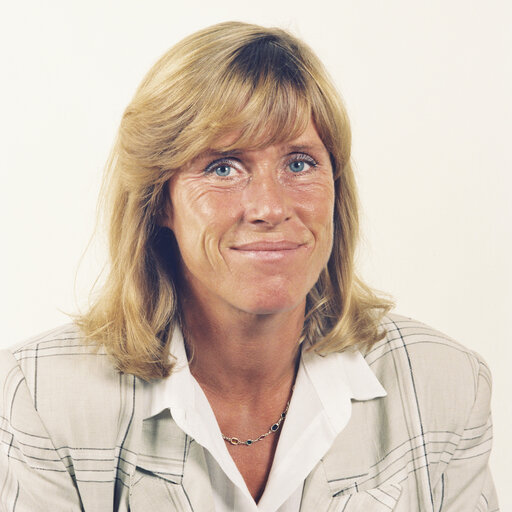
Bárbara Dührkop

Bárbara Dührkop Dührkop (born 27 July 1945, in Hanover) is a Spanish politician and member of the Spanish Socialist Workers' Party (PSOE). She was until 2009 a Member of the European Parliament, where she was a vice-chair of the Socialist Group and sat on the European Parliament's Committee on Budgets, as well as being a substitute on the Committee on Agriculture and Rural Development and the Committee on Budgetary Control.

Her husband Enrique Casas Vila was assassinated by the Comandos Autónomos Anticapitalistas (CAA) in 1984.

== Education ==
- 1971: Graduate in humanities of the University of Uppsala (Sweden)
- 1973: Language teacher in Hamburg

== Career ==
- 1974-1978: Lecturer at the University of Erlangen–Nuremberg
- 1978-1987: Language teacher at the Usandizaga Institute and the German School (San Sebastián)
- 1995: Chair of the Board of the German School in San Sebastian
- 1999: Member of the executive committee of the Socialist Party of Euskadi - Euskadiko Ezkerra
- since 1987: Member of the European Parliament
- 1989-1994: Socialist coordinator on the Committee on Culture and Education
- 1994-1999: Vice-chairwoman of the Committee on Budgets
- 1995: Awarded the Mujer Progresista prize

== Decorations ==
- Grand Cross of the Order of Civil Merit of the Republic of Austria

== See also ==
- 2004 European Parliament election in Spain
