= World Service (Delirious? album) =

Studio album by Delirious?
- Released: 15 December 2003
- Studios: Ford Lane Studios (West Sussex, UK)
- Genres: Rock, Christian rock
- Length: 57:20
- Label: Furious?
- Producers: Julian Kindred and Delirious?

Delirious? chronology
Access:D (2002)	World Service (2003)	The Mission Bell (2005)

Professional ratings
Review scores
Source	Rating
Christianity Today	4/5 stars
Cross Rhythms	9/10
HM Magazine	(Favourable)
Jesus Freak Hideout	4.5/5 stars
The Phantom Tollbooth	(Favourable)

World Service is the fifth studio album by English Christian rock band Delirious?. It was released in 2003. Although it is more of a worship-oriented album as was Glo, Delirious? released two singles to the German market: "Inside Outside" and "Every Little Thing". The former sold over twelve thousand copies, was number one in German radio station SWR3's chart, and spent seven weeks in the German singles charts peaking at number seventy-two. Delirious? also released two free MP3 downloads on mp3.com, both topping the Guitar Rock charts (the first for a full month). The first MP3, "Majesty (Here I Am)", hit number fifteen on the worldwide charts; the second, "Rain Down", reached number twenty-eight. The two together had amassed over 500,000 listens/downloads after fifty days. The band's American single "Rain Down" has become its biggest multi-format hit since "Deeper."

== MP3 singles ==
On 1 October 2003, the band released "Majesty (Here I Am)" as a free download from mp3.com. The song reached the top 15 worldwide and stayed at the top of the Guitar Rock charts for the entire month of October. At the beginning of the following month, on 1 November, Delirious? released "Rain Down." This, too, topped the Guitar Rock charts; however, it only reached No. 28 worldwide. Together, the singles amassed over 500,000 downloads.

== Track listing ==
1. "Grace Like a River" (Stuart Garrard, Martin Smith) – 4:06
2. "Rain Down" (Smith, Garrard) – 4:51
3. "God In Heaven" (Smith, Garrard) – 4:28
4. "Majesty (Here I Am)" (Garrard, Smith) – 5:31
5. "Inside Outside" (Smith, Garrard) – 5:41
6. "Free" (Smith, Garrard, Jonathan Thatcher) – 3:59
7. "Everyone Knows"(Garrard, Smith) – 4:30
8. "With You" (Smith, Garrard) – 4:36
9. "Mountains High"(Smith) – 3:55
10. "I Was Blind" (Smith, Garrard) – 5:52
11. "Feel It Coming On" (Smith, Garrard) – 5:10
12. "Every Little Thing" (Smith, Garrard) – 4:34

== Personnel ==
Delirious?

- Martin Smith – vocals, guitars
- Tim Jupp – keyboards, acoustic piano, Hammond B3 organ, brass
- Stuart Garrard – guitars, vocals
- Jon Thatcher – bass guitar, synth bass
- Stew Smith – drums, percussion

Additional musicians

- Julian Kindred – programming
- Adam "A Skillz" Mills – loops (9)
- Gerard Le Feuvre – cello
- Steve Morris – violin
- Hillsong Church Choir – choir (4)
- Darlene Zschech – choir arrangements (4)
- Steve McPherson – choir arrangements (4)
- Daniel Bedingfield – guest vocals (12)

=== Production ===
- Delirious? – producers
- Julian Kindred – producer, recording, editing
- Sam Gibson – mixing at Jacobs Studios (Surrey, UK)
- Adrian Newton – mix assistant
- Jon Olliffe – mix assistant
- Louis Read – mix assistant
- Stu G – editing
- Tim Jupp – editing
- Tony High – editing
- Chris Blair – mastering at Abbey Road Studios (London, UK)
- Furious? Records – art direction, design, photography
- Andy Hutch – photography
- Tony Patolo – management

== Charts ==
Chart performance for World Service
Chart (2004)	Peak position
US Top Christian Albums (Billboard)	20
US Heatseekers Albums (Billboard)	26
