= Paul Rudd (disambiguation) =

Paul Rudd (born 1969) is an American actor known for comedies.

Paul Rudd may also refer to:

- Paul Ryan Rudd (1940–2010), American actor known for theater work
- Paul Rudd (DJ) (born 1979), English house music DJ
