= I Can't Read You =

2003 single by Daniel Bedingfield

Single by Daniel Bedingfield

from the album Gotta Get thru This
- B-side: "Inflate My Ego"
- Released: 7 April 2003
- Length: 4:06
- Label: Polydor
- Songwriter: Daniel Bedingfield
- Producer: Daniel Bedingfield

Daniel Bedingfield singles chronology
"If You're Not the One" (2002)	"I Can't Read You" (2003)	"Never Gonna Leave Your Side" (2003)

"I Can't Read You" is the fourth single from New Zealand-British singer Daniel Bedingfield's debut studio album, Gotta Get thru This. It was released on 7 April 2003 and peaked at number six on the UK Singles Chart, number 34 in Ireland, and number 93 in the Netherlands.

== Track listings ==
UK CD single

1. "I Can't Read You" (single version)
2. "Inflate My Ego"
3. "James Dean (I Wanna Know)" (Todd Edwards Lifeline vocal edit)
4. "I Can't Read You" (video)

UK cassette single

1. "I Can't Read You" (single version)
2. "James Dean (I Wanna Know)" (Todd Edwards Lifeline vocal edit)

== Credits and personnel ==
Credits are lifted from the Gotta Get Thru This album booklet.

Studio

- Mastered at Sony Music Studios (London, England)

Personnel

- Daniel Bedingfield – writing, production
- Lewis Taylor – guitar, bass
- David "Deebo" Hart – additional guitar
- Greg Lester – additional guitar
- Dean Livermore – additional drums
- Miles Bould – percussion
- Stephen Emmanuel – co-production, mixing
- Ned Douglas – engineering
- John Davis – mastering

== Charts ==
=== Weekly charts ===
Chart (2003–2004)	Peak position
Europe (Eurochart Hot 100)	28
Ireland (IRMA)	34
Netherlands (Dutch Top 40 Tipparade)	4
Netherlands (Single Top 100)	93
Scotland Singles (OCC)	4
UK Singles (OCC)	6

=== Year-end charts ===
Chart (2003)	Position
UK Singles (OCC)	148
