= DJ Paul (disambiguation) =

DJ Paul is an American rapper, record producer and DJ

DJ Paul may also refer to:

- DJ Pauly D, American television personality and DJ
- DJ Paul Elstak, Dutch hardcore DJ
- Paul Oakenfold, English record producer and trance DJ
- Paul Rudd, English house music DJ
- Paul van Dyk, German DJ and record producer
- Paul Woolford, English dance music DJ
- Paul Taylor, Scottish electronic DJ
- Paul Banks, English-American musician and DJ
- Paul Newton, English dance music DJ
- Paul Miller, American hip-hop DJ
- Paul Johnson, American house DJ
- Paul Flynn, English dance music DJ
- Tall Paul, English DJ
- Joshua Paul Davis, American record producer and DJ
