= Never Gonna Leave Your Side =

2003 single by Daniel Bedingfield

Single by Daniel Bedingfield

from the album Gotta Get thru This
- B-side: "Right Girl" (live)
- Released: 30 June 2003
- Length: 3:56
- Label: Polydor
- Songwriter: Daniel Bedingfield
- Producer: Mark Taylor

Daniel Bedingfield singles chronology
"I Can't Read You" (2003)	"Never Gonna Leave Your Side" (2003)	"Friday" (2003)

"Never Gonna Leave Your Side" is the fifth single released from New Zealand-British singer Daniel Bedingfield's first album, Gotta Get thru This (2002). Issued in Australia on 30 June 2003 and in the United Kingdom on 21 July, the song became Bedingfield's third No. 1 song on the UK Singles Chart, topping the chart on the week starting 27 July. The song also peaked at No. 11 in Ireland and No. 13 in New Zealand.

== Music video ==
The music video for "Never Gonna Leave Your Side" was filmed in Ronda, Spain, known as the "Dreaming City". By coincidence, Ronda, Spain, is located on the antipode of Auckland, New Zealand, where Bedingfield was born.

== Track listings ==
- UK CD single
1. "Never Gonna Leave Your Side"
2. "Never Gonna Leave Your Side" (Metro Mix radio edit)
3. "Right Girl" (live)
4. "Never Gonna Leave Your Side" (video)
- UK cassette single
1. "Never Gonna Leave Your Side" (album version)
2. "If You're Not the One" (The Passengerz Girlfriend Club mix)
- UK DVD single
1. "Never Gonna Leave Your Side"
2. "If You're Not the One" (live video from the Shepherd's Bush Empire)
3. "Never Gonna Leave Your Side" (Metro mix)
4. "If You're Not the One" (American video)
- Australian CD single
1. "Never Gonna Leave Your Side" (album version) – 3:53
2. "Never Gonna Leave Your Side" (Metro mix) – 4:47
3. "If You're Not the One" (The Passengerz Girlfriend Club mix) – 7:09
4. "Never Gonna Leave Your Side" (enhanced video) – 3:53
5. "If You're Not the One" (enhanced US version) – 4:02

== Charts ==
=== Weekly charts ===
Chart (2003)	Peak position
Australia (ARIA)	30
Belgium (Ultratop 50 Flanders)	28
Denmark (Tracklisten)	16
Europe (Eurochart Hot 100)	6
Ireland (IRMA)	11
Netherlands (Dutch Top 40)	14
Netherlands (Single Top 100)	17
New Zealand (Recorded Music NZ)	13
Norway (VG-lista)	19
Romania (Romanian Top 100)	98
Scottish Singles Sales (Official Charts)	2
Sweden (Sverigetopplistan)	29
UK Singles (Official Charts)	1

=== Year-end charts ===
Chart (2003)	Position
UK Singles (OCC)	54

== Release history ==
Region	Date	Format(s)	Label(s)	Ref.
Australia	30 June 2003	CD	Polydor	
United Kingdom	21 July 2003	CD; DVD; cassette	Polydor	
