= Agneta Engström =

Swedish sailor (born 1971)

Karin Agneta Engström (born 25 May 1971) is a Swedish Olympic sailor. She finished 9th in the 470 event at the 2000 Summer Olympics together with Lena Carlsson.
