= The Raw Men Empire =

Israeli indie folk band

- Also known as: TRME
- Origin: Tel Aviv, Israel
- Genres: Indie folk, Freak Folk, Anti-folk
- Years active: 2009–present
- Members: Tsvika Frosh; Yonatan Miller; Nadav Lazar; Itai Kaufman
- Website: trmeband.com

The Raw Men Empire is an Israeli Indie folk band, operating from Tel Aviv since 2009. The Raw Men Empire is made up of Tsvika Frosh (lyrics, music, vocals, guitar, flute), Yonatan Miller (lyrics, music, guitar, vocals), Nadav Lazar (bass, glockenspiel, percussion, guitar, melodica, programming, vocals) and Itai Kaufman (beatbox, percussion, bass, melodica, programming, keyboards, charango, vocals).

== History ==
The Raw Men Empire was formed in 2009 by accidental meetings of its members in various Tel Aviv bars. Coming from different musical backgrounds (low-fi minimalism, alternative rock, blues and avant garde progressive rock), their style and use of a wide variety of unusual instruments has been compared to Devendra Banhart and Joanna Newsom, as well as anti-folk artist Jeffrey Lewis by several music blogs and commentators worldwide.

During 2009, The Raw Men Empire released their first EP, The Rise and Fall Of. During 2010, they released their second EP, Elodie, which was received with warm reviews in Israeli media.

The Raw Men Empire have performed and recorded in co-operation with a variety of Israeli and international musicians, among them Uri Wertheim of the funk band The Apples. In May 2010, they opened Jeffrey Lewis's show in Israel and, in October 2010, they performed in Israel's most important indie music festival, In-D-Negev, featuring singer-songwriter Amit Erez and a brass quintet. In the same month, the band received the Best Music Award in SmallBama 9 Festival for the original music they wrote and performed for the dance-theatre piece "Loop". Later that year, following an accidental meeting in the streets of Tel Aviv, The Raw Men Empire wrote and recorded a song with the British singer-songwriter Daniel Bedingfield.

In 2011, the band gained success around Europe as well. Their tour earned them good reviews in the Prague Post, Gazeta Wyborcza, Indie Rock Cafe. They were selected to play the prestigious Popkomm and Reeperbahn Festivals and for CMJ showcase festival in New York.

== Discography ==
=== EPs ===
- The Rise and Fall of (2009)
- Elodie (2010)

=== Singles ===
- "Town Full of Sinners" (2010)
- "Between You and Me" (2010)
