= Aikaterini Kaloudi =

Greek sailor

Personal information
- Nationality: Greek
- Born: 19 September 1974 (age 52) Athens, Greece
- Height: 167 cm (5 ft 6 in)
- Weight: 56 kg (123 lb)

Sport
- Sport: Sailing

Aikaterini Kaloudi (Greek: Αικατερίνη Καλούδη, also known as Katerina Kaloudi, born 19 September 1974) is a Greek sailor. She competed in the women's 470 event at the 1996 Summer Olympics.
