= Tung Chun Mei =

Hong Kong competitive sailor

Personal information
- Nationality: Hong Konger
- Born: 27 March 1974 (age 51)

Sport
- Sport: Sailing

Tung Chun Mei (born 27 March 1974) is a Hong Kong sailor. She competed in the women's 470 event at the 1996 Summer Olympics.
