= Stephen Emmanuel =

- Also known as: Colours
- Origin: United Kingdom
- Genres: UK garage, house, pop
- Occupation(s): Musician, songwriter, record producer
- Years active: 1998–present
- Labels: Inferno, Ice Cream Records, VC Recordings

Stephen Emmanuel is a UK garage/dance music producer and songwriter, best known for the hits "What U Do" and "Coochy Coo", both of which feature singer Eska.

== Career ==
Emmanuel, credited as 'Colours', released the 1998 single "What U Do" featuring British singer Eska, which reached No. 51 on the UK Singles Chart and No. 1 on the UK Dance Singles Chart. In 2000, the single "Coochy Coo", also featuring Eska, peaked at No. 32 on the UK Singles Chart and No. 17 on the UK Dance Singles Chart.

The SE22 Mix of Emmanuel's 1998 garage track "Hold On" was sampled by Craig David and Tinchy Stryder in 2008 on the song "Where's Your Love", as well as on the 10° Below Dub Mix of Kele Le Roc's "My Love". Capital XTRA included "Hold On (SE22 Mix)" in their list of "The Best Old-School Garage Anthems of All Time". It was also included in NME's "25 essential UK garage anthems" list in September 2019. Why the track is on the list, Fred Garratt-Stanley wrote: "Rising strings, mashed-up keyboard sequences and irresistibly tempting background claps make for an enticing introduction to this classic, before June Hamm's vocals rise above the noise to ask 'Where is your love?'. It's a question no garage fan should need to be asked twice of this track."

As a producer/songwriter, Emmanuel has written and/or produced songs for other artists such as Daniel Bedingfield ("He Don't Love You Like I Love You" / "I Can't Read You" - UK No. 6), Another Level, S Club 7, Billie, S.O.A.P., and Precious.

Macedonian-Serbian singer Tijana covered "Coochy Coo", titled "Kao da..." for her 2001 debut album of the same name.
