= Lena Carlsson =

Swedish sailor

Lena Margareta Wilton Nee Carlsson (born 21 May 1972) is a Swedish Olympic sailor. She finished 14th in the 470 event at the 1996 Summer Olympics together with Boel Bengtsson and 9th in the 470 event at the 2000 Summer Olympics together with Agneta Engström.
