= Leigh Andrew-Pearson =

Canadian sailor

Personal information
- Born: 7 March 1972 (age 54) Ottawa, Ontario, Canada

Sport
- Sport: Sailing

Leigh Andrew-Pearson (born 3 July 1972) is a Canadian sailor. She competed in the women's 470 event at the 1996 Summer Olympics.
