= Paul Rudd (DJ) =

British DJ and music producer

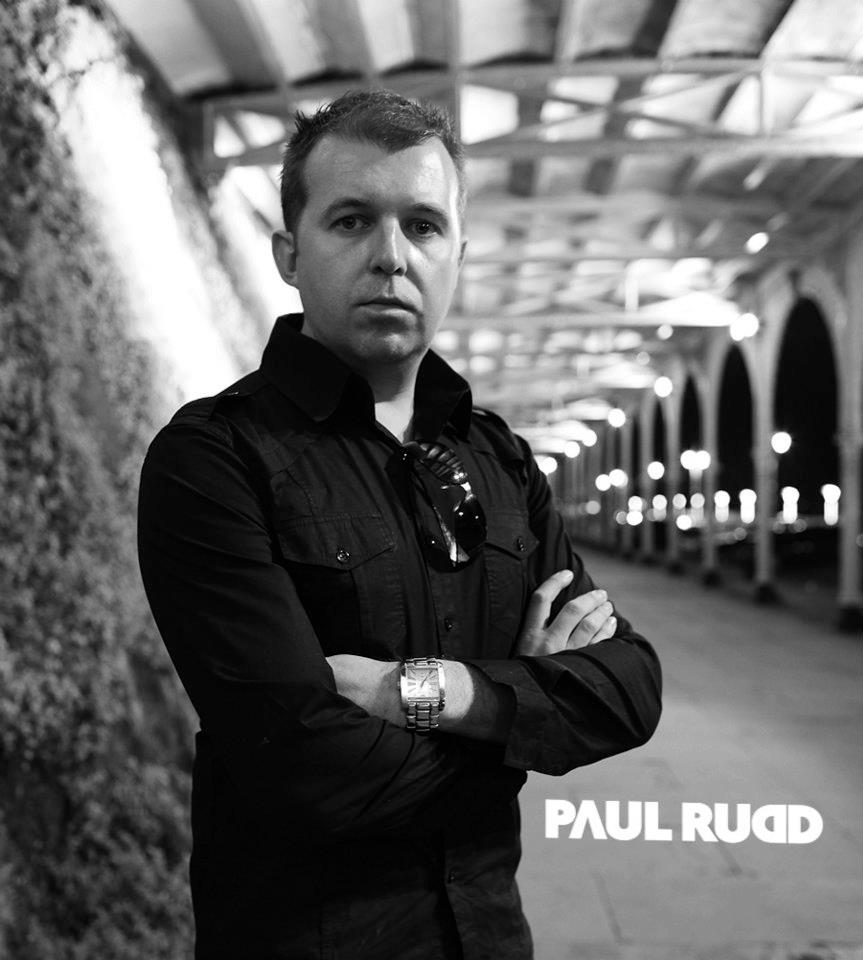

Background information
- Also known as: DJ Paul Rudd
- Born: 15 September 1979 (age 47); Dartford, Kent, England
- Genres: Electro house, house
- Years active: 1998–present
- Labels: Believe Digital, Eden Records, Ditto Music, Globotracks, Paul Rudd
- Website: paulrudd.co.uk

Paul Rudd (born 15 September 1979), also known professionally as DJ Paul Rudd, is an English house music DJ, radio presenter and music producer. Starting as a radio DJ during the 1990s, he went on to DJ at venues around the world, before returning to the UK club scene. Rudd has released fifteen singles to date and his debut album, The Sound of London, came out in November 2012.

== Biography ==
=== 1998–2011 ===
Paul Rudd was born in Dartford, Kent, and had musical influences from both of his parents. He set up a school radio station at his secondary school and then moved on to Hospital radio. In 1998, Rudd won the 'Search for a Star' competition at the Capital Radio Café in Leicester Square, London, with Neil Fox. Since his breakthrough, Rudd DJed at clubs around England including clubs in Liverpool, Manchester, Nottingham and being a resident DJ in London's Galaxy Nightclub.

Previous to 2011, Rudd had been remixing for Mis-teeq, Alexander O'Neil, Elton John, David Gray and Daft Punk, through Mastermix and DMC.

=== 2011–2014 ===
In June 2011, Rudd released his first single, "X-Me", featuring American actress Kelly-Anne Lyons on vocals. "Egotastic", the follow-up to "X-Me", was launched at the Ibiza Rocks festival, where he was DJing with Hed Kandi. Released at the end of June 2011, the 3 1/2-minute track played across Europe. "More Amore", featuring Vivi, released in November 2011, was shortlisted in the final of the 'One to Watch' category of MTV's Brand New for 2012 competition. Differing slightly from his earlier releases, Rudd described the track as including "an incessant piano motif, layered with weighty beats and heavy drops", like an "old school club classic with a modern twist".

Rudd's catalogue expanded in May 2012 with the release of "Set Me Free 2012", a remake of the 1986 hit featuring its original singer, Jaki Graham on vocals. The track was recorded at Britannia Row Studios, London, in March 2012, and mixed by Soul 2 Soul's Tony Matthew, Britannia's engineer. Model Louise Cole was featured in the music video. Rudd and Graham first met in 2003, and when they met again years later, Rudd asked Graham if she would be interested in collaborating on a remix. Graham said later, "I was really interested in doing something like this. There's so many classics from the 80s being revamped and I was delighted that Paul approached me to re-work Set Me Free, as recently I have been recording mainly contemporary jazz music for the new album. I liked the instrumental and I'm just happy that one of my favourite hits has been given a 2012 makeover that appeals to all!"

Rudd followed up this success with two more tracks in 2012, "Neon Lights" with vocals from Richard Oliver and "Out of My Mind", with the latter being well received not only in the UK but also in the United States, with a Chicago-based radio station ranking it in its top 10 charts of the year. Rudd was also shortlisted for the MTV Unsigned Competition 2013.

He became an ambassador for 888 Casino worldwide in 2012 along with Shane Warne.

In December 2012, Rudd agreed on a collaboration with house music singer, Amanda Wilson, to release a single in March 2013. "Trust in Me" was a ballad, which was a departure from anything that Rudd or Wilson had worked on before. The track was then remixed by Cutmore, Andi Durrant, Mikael Wills and VIP with a Club Mix as well. This then went on to hit No. 4 in the UK Official Club Charts with Musicweek. It also passed Ellie Goulding to the No. 1 spot in The DJ Top 30 in Canada and stayed at No. 1 for two weeks in the Fusion Top 100 Dance Chart in the USA.

Due to Rudd's increasing profile, his namesake, American actor Paul Rudd told the BBC that he wished to meet the producer so the pair could record a single together.

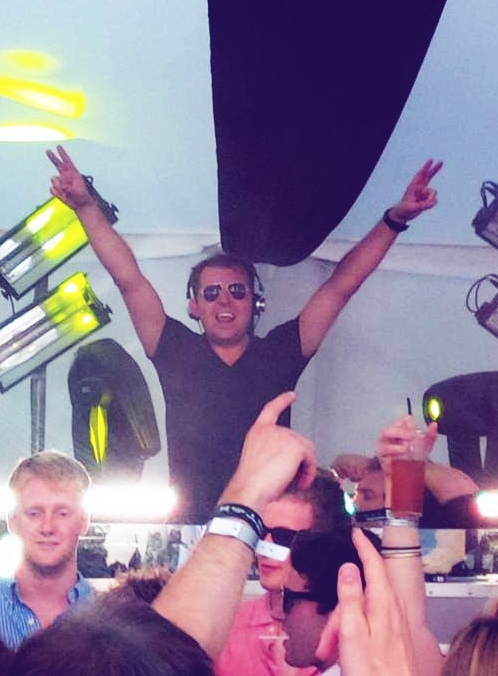
Rudd in 2013

In 2013, Rudd collaborated with the rock singer Sam Calver on a summer anthem, "Wake The World Tonight", which was released in June that year. This went to No. 4 in the Official Musicweek Club charts and No. 1 in the Fusion Top 100 in the US. He then followed up with his highest-peaking single Searching featuring Chloe Mills in February 2014. It reached No. 3 on the Official Music Week Club Charts and No.8 in the Music Week Commercial Pop Charts.

In June 2014, he released a cover of the 1987 hit "The Way It Is" by Bruce Hornsby. It was the first remix of the track in nearly 12-year since Tupac Shakur sampled it for the song 'Changes'. Rudd wanted to keep it close to the original track, but said that it opened up the song to a new generation that may have missed it.

In August 2014, Rudd released the single "Night & Day". It peaked at No. 4 in the Official Music Week Club Charts, and No.4 in the US Fusion Top 100. The song also featured as part of the new morning production for the Capital Radio Breakfast Show from Global Radio, nationally every day at 9 am. The video to Night & Day was premiered on C4's 'Sunday Brunch' with presenters Tim Lovejoy and Simon Rimmer.

In 2014, Rudd started a weekly Radio Show Globalsessions which currently airs in over 40 countries and 150 stations every week.

=== 2015–2018 ===
Rudd took a break in 2015 from releasing singles, and wanted to spend more time in the studio as well as mix for SuperGroup. Rudd was also the launch DJ for P&O's newest and largest cruise ship at the time for the UK market. The MV Britannia was launched and named by Queen Elizabeth II in March 2015.

In August 2016, Rudd worked on the single "Something Good" along with Andrew Wilson of Kiss FM and Soul Seekerz. The vocals were from Kelli-Leigh, who already had massive hits with Duke Dumont, Second City and Skepta. It was agreed after an American deal that the single would be released at a future date.

After concentrating on live performances in 2016 and 2017, Rudd DJed with Heart FM DJ Pandora at numerous events as a duo called Pandamonia. They then teamed up together to release the song "I Scream" in October 2016.

=== 2019–present ===
In March 2019, it was announced that Rudd would be DJing for The Warner Leisure group at the opening of Studley Castle after a £50 million refurbishment. It reopened in April 2019 as their 14th hotel in the Warner collection and Rudd performed along with Pixie Lott, Lemar, Beverley Knight, Gareth Gates, Matt Cardle and The Feeling.

He released a 'Greatest Hits' album on 14 October 2018. It was titled To Be Continued as Rudd had recently said in the press that he was already writing new material. He was then seen posting images on Instagram in early 2019 of studio writing sessions with vocalist Rachael Hawnt and Amanda Wilson with whom he had previously worked in 2013.

Rudd released a new track, the first solo single in 3 years on 27 October 2019 titled 'Eagles Fly'. Released through Globotracks and Believe Digital worldwide.

It was announced that Rudd will DJ and support for P&O's newest and largest cruise ship for the UK market - MV Iona at its launch called IONAFEST in July 2020 along with a host of stars including Gary Barlow, Pixie Lott, Clean Bandit and Jo Whiley.

It was announced in March 2026 that Rudd will be the new host of the Global Dance Top 20 Radio Show by WARM (World Airplay Radio Monitor), weekly distributed by Syndicast and with the listings appearing weekly on the Billboard_charts.

In July of 2026, Paul released his first single after a seven year hiatus from making music. It was titled 'Chasing Midnight' and went on to peak at number 7 in the Music Week UK Club Charts in October 2026. He released his next single called 'Heartbeat' in late September 2026.

It was announced by Nexus Radio in America at the start of October, that Paul would be their special guest host for the ADE (Amsterdam Dance Music Event) in October and present the prestigious Nexus Lounge and awards.

== Awards and nominations ==
Year	Organisation	Award	Work	Result
2012	MTV	MTV Unsigned 2012	More Amore	Nominated
2013	MTV	Brand New For 2013	Trust In Me	Nominated

== Discography singles ==
Title	Year	Format
"X-Me" (featuring Kelly-Anne Lyons)	2011	Digital download
"Egotastic"	2011	Digital download
"More Amore" (featuring ViVi)	2011	Digital download
"Set Me Free 2012" (featuring Jaki Graham)	2012	Digital download
"Neon Lights"	2012	Digital download
"Control Me"	2012	Digital download
"Out Of My Mind"	2012	Digital download
"(Never Stop) Take It Off"	2013	Digital download
"Trust In Me" (featuring Amanda Wilson)	2013	Digital download
"Wake The World Tonight" (featuring Sam Calver)	2013	Digital download
"Searching" (featuring Chloe Mills)	2014	Digital download
"My Mind" (featuring Beat21)	2014	Digital download
"The Way It Is 2014"	2014	Digital download
"Night & Day"	2014	Digital download
"Something Good" (featuring Kelli-Leigh)	2016	Digital download
"Eagles Fly"	2019	Digital download
"Chasing Midnight"	2026	Digital download
"Heartbeat"	2026	Digital download

== Discography albums ==
Title	Year	Format
The Sound Of London	2013	Digital download
To Be Continued	2018	Digital download
