= Enikő Németh =

Hungarian sailor

Personal information
- Nationality: Hungarian
- Born: 4 February 1978 (age 47); Keszthely, Hungary

Sport
- Sport: Sailing

Enikő Németh (born 4 February 1978) is a Hungarian sailor. She competed in the women's 470 event at the 1996 Summer Olympics.
