= Katalin Bácsics =

Hungarian sailor (born 1975)

Personal information
- Nationality: Hungarian
- Born: 22 November 1973 (age 51); Keszthely, Hungary

Sport
- Sport: Sailing

Katalin Bácsics (born 22 November 1973) is a Hungarian sailor. She competed in the women's 470 event at the 1996 Summer Olympics.
