= Making Waves (software) =

Digital audio workstation

- Making Waves Studio v5.42
- Developer(s): Making Waves Audio Ltd.
- Stable release: 5.42 / 2011; 14 years ago
- Operating system: Microsoft Windows
- Type: Digital audio workstation
- License: Proprietary
- Website: makingwavessoftware.com/

Making Waves (MW) is computer software designed to produce professional quality audio from basic Windows multimedia PCs. This application was among the first of the 16-bit digital sequencers that evolved from the MS-DOS WAV trackers of the Eighties to become the digital audio workstation software available today including Steinberg Cubase, Pro Tools and ACID Pro. Making Waves enabled a small community of independent artists (originally including Daniel Bedingfield) to use existing hardware to record, sample, mix and render their own original work creating professional-quality audio with a modest investment of less than $100. This same dynamic user community played a significant role in the application's development, suggesting program revisions and performing extensive beta testing. These users were all organized and mentored by Stephen John Steele, the original programmer and developer of Making Waves as well as a founding director of Perceptive Solutions, Spacehead Systems and Making Waves Software Limited.

== Overview ==
The application's interface integrates a sequencer, mixer, sampler and wave editor compatible with Musical Instrument Digital Interface (MIDI), Virtual Studio Technology (VST) and some DirectX plugins (only effects, not instruments), and the program's key feature is live mixing of MIDI input with VST (instruments and effects) and digital samples including Yamaha XG (EXtended General MIDI) sound libraries. Making Waves Studio renders mp3, wav and MIDI files or can be purchased as an inexpensive audio-only wav sequencer.

The early commercial success of this embryonic digital audio workstation (DAW) was relatively brief and seemed to build on two significant events, the release of a stable graphical user interface (GUI) version and the production of a "hit" record and album by an independent artist. First, with the release of the 32-bit Making Waves Studio version in April 1998, Perceptive Solutions had a product compatible with the Windows 95 GUI. The version provided a number of audio features never before or since consolidated at that price point. Next, Daniel Bedingfield's number one UK single was created with Making Waves and released in November 2001. His number two first album of the same name, Gotta Get Through This, soon followed. Making Waves began to gain sales and acceptance within the digital audio community as an affordable professional audio platform and VST host, a complete "recording studio-in-a-box"."

While still available for sale, Making Waves lacks a 64-bit version, is not approved for use on Windows 8 and is no longer being maintained following the death of the original developer in 2011.
