= Usandizaga =

Usandizaga is a Basque surname. Notable people with the surname include:

- Horacio Usandizaga (1940–2026), Argentine politician
- José María Usandizaga (1887–1915), Spanish Basque composer
- Sofía Usandizaga (born 1970), Argentine sailor
