= Sue Hay-Carr =

British sailor (born 1964)

Personal information
- Nationality: British
- Born: 15 September 1964 (age 61) Billericay, England

Sport
- Sport: Sailing

Susan Hay-Carr (born 15 September 1964) is a British sailor. She competed at the 1988 Summer Olympics, the 1992 Summer Olympics, and the 1996 Summer Olympics.

== Career ==
From the late 1980s, she was a PE and Maths teacher at Sinfin Community School. In August 1988 Thorntons gave her £3500.

She sailed with Debbie Jarvis in 1988 and 1992, and Bethan Raggatt in 1996.

== Personal life ==
She moved to Slacketts Lane, Sudbury, Derbyshire in the early 1990s, with husband Chris.
