= Coolooloosh =

Israeli band

Coolooloosh קולולוש
- Origin: Jerusalem, Israel
- Genres: Hip hop; funk; jazz; folk
- Years active: 2003–2014; 2018–present
- Labels: The Eighth Note; High Fidelity; Kame'a
- Members: Rebel Sun; Ori Winokur; Yuval Gerstein; Yogev Shitrit; Sefi Zisling; Omer Luz
- Past members: Arik Levy; Matan Gov Ari; Dedi Cohen; Yaon Ozuna; David Chacham Herson

Coolooloosh (Hebrew: קולולוש) is an Israeli band which combines in its songs hip hop, funk, jazz and folk music.

== History ==
Coolooloosh formed in 2003 in Jerusalem. In 2005, The Eighth Note released their self-titled debut studio album. In 2006 they released the single "Fight Rebel Sun" that was included in the digital version of the album and recorded as a part of a struggle to keep Jewish-American soloist Rebel Sun in Israel. Finally, the struggle succeeded and Rebel Sun got Israeli citizenship.

In early 2008, the band recorded their second studio album in the United States, called Elements of Sound. The album was released on November 27, 2008 and includes guest appearances from American R&B musician Bunny Sigler and Grammy Award-nominated American record producer David Ivory. The album got many praises in Israel and abroad.

In 2009 they released the remix album Coolooloosh Remixed, that includes remixes to the previous album's songs which was produced by Michael Cohen, Ben Hendler and Johnny Goldstein, among others.

In 2011 they released the single "Everyday" featuring British singer Daniel Bedingfield, that was recorded during Bedingfield's visiting in Israel.

The band disbanded in 2014. In 2018 they reformed, releasing their debut extended play The Stakes Are High.

== Discography ==
=== Studio albums ===
- Coolooloosh (2005)
- Elements of Sound (2008)

=== Extended plays ===
- The Stakes Are High (2018)

=== Live albums ===
- Live in the Dark (2007)

=== Remix albums ===
- Coolooloosh Remixed (2009)

=== Compilation albums ===
- Combina (2010)
