= Inside Outside (Delirious? song) =

Single by Delirious?

from the album World Service
- Released: 2004
- Recorded: 2003
- Genre: Rock
- Length: 5:41 (Album Version)
- Label: Furious? Records
- Songwriters: Stuart Garrard; Martin Smith
- Producers: Julian Kindred; Delirious?

Delirious? singles chronology
"I Could Sing Of Your Love Forever" (2001)	"Inside Outside" (2004)	"Every Little Thing" (2004)

"Inside Outside" is the fifth track on the album World Service by Delirious?. On 8 March 2004, "Inside Outside" was released to the German singles market. It reached #72 in its first week and stayed in the top 100 for six more, an unprecedented achievement for a Christian song. This was arguably the breakthrough for Delirious? in Germany.

== Track listing ==
1. "Inside Outside" (Audiostar Radio Mix)
2. "Inside Outside" (British Short Version)
3. "Inside Outside" (Original Album Version)
4. "Grace Like A River"
5. "It’s OK"

== Charts ==
Weekly chart performance for "Inside Outside"
Chart (2004)	Peak position
Germany (GfK)	72
