= Second First Impression =

Studio album by Daniel Bedingfield
- Released: 8 November 2004
- Recorded: 2003–2004
- Genres: Pop; R&B
- Length: 47:51
- Label: Polydor
- Producers: Jack Joseph Puig; Daniel Bedingfield

Daniel Bedingfield chronology
Gotta Get thru This (2002)	Second First Impression (2004)	Stop the Traffik - Secret Fear (2013)

Singles from Second First Impression
- 1. "Nothing Hurts Like Love" Released: 25 October 2004; 2. "Wrap My Words Around You" Released: 7 February 2005; 3. "The Way" Released: 23 May 2005

Second First Impression is the second studio album released by British singer-songwriter Daniel Bedingfield. Released on 8 November 2004, it peaked at number eight on the UK Albums Chart. The album title comes from the chorus of track 7 on the album, "Show Me the Real You", and also serves as a reference to this being Bedingfield's second album.

In the United Kingdom, the first single to be taken from the album was "Nothing Hurts Like Love", which peaked at number three on the UK Singles Chart in the same month as the album was released. The second single was "Wrap My Words Around You", released in February 2005, followed by "The Way". The UK release includes two bonus tracks, "Draw You" and "A Kiss Without Commitment", and a hidden track entitled "I'm Not Dead", which refers to Bedingfield's near-fatal car accident in New Zealand earlier in 2004.

== Track listing ==
All songs written by Daniel Bedingfield, except where noted.

1. "Growing Up" – 3:04
2. "Complicated" – 3:31
3. "Wrap My Words Around You" – 3:10
4. "All Your Attention" (lyrics: Bedingfield, music: Diane Warren) – 3:46
5. "The Way" – 3:17
6. "Sorry" (lyrics: Bedingfield, music: Bedingfield, David Hart) – 4:59
7. "Show Me the Real You" (lyrics: Bedingfield, music: Bedingfield, Hart, Eric Appapoulay) – 3:32
8. "Don't Give'r It All" – 2:22
9. "Nothing Hurts Like Love" (Warren) – 3:04
10. "Holiness" – 3:30
11. "All the Little Children" – 5:51
- The song "All the Little Children" ends at 1:51. The hidden track "I'm Not Dead" starts at 4:21.

UK bonus tracks

13. "Draw You" (Demo) (lyrics: Bedingfield, music: Bedingfield, Hart) – 3:22
14. "A Kiss Without Commitment" (Demo) – 2:44

Singapore bonus track

12. "If You're Not the One" – 4:20

== Charts ==
=== Weekly charts ===
Chart (2004–2005)	Peak position
Dutch Albums (Album Top 100)	99
French Albums (SNEP)	83
Irish Albums (IRMA)	65
Scottish Albums (Official Charts)	20
Swiss Albums (Schweizer Hitparade)	88
UK Albums (Official Charts)	8

=== Year-end charts ===
Chart (2004)	Position
UK Albums (OCC)	119
Chart (2005)	Position
UK Albums (OCC)	173

== Certifications ==
Region	Certification	Certified units/sales
United Kingdom (BPI)	Gold	275,000
