= Gotta Get Thru This (album) =

Studio album by Daniel Bedingfield
- Released: 26 August 2002
- Recorded: 2001–2002
- Genre: Pop; garage; R&B
- Length: 43:18
- Label: Polydor
- Producer: Daniel Bedingfield; D&D Productions; Stephen Emmanuel; Martin Newman; Ali Staton; Al Stone; Mark Taylor

Daniel Bedingfield chronology
Gotta Get Thru This (2002)	Second First Impression (2004)

Singles from Gotta Get Thru This
- 1. "Gotta Get Thru This" Released: 26 November 2001; 2. "James Dean (I Wanna Know)" Released: 27 August 2002; 3. "If You're Not the One" Released: 25 November 2002; 4. "I Can't Read You" Released: 21 April 2003; 5. "Never Gonna Leave Your Side" Released: 21 July 2003; 6. "Friday" Released: 20 October 2003

Alternative covers
- American cover

Professional ratings
Review scores
Source	Rating
AllMusic	4/5 stars
Blender	3/5 stars
The Guardian	2/5 stars
NME	4/5 stars
The Village Voice	A−

Gotta Get Thru This is the debut studio album by English-New Zealand singer Daniel Bedingfield. The album was released on 26 August 2002 by Polydor Records. It reached number two on the UK Albums Chart, and is certified five times platinum, having sold over 1.63 million copies. Worldwide, the album has sold over 4 million copies.

Six singles were released from the album, including the number-one hits "Gotta Get Thru This", "If You're Not the One" and "Never Gonna Leave Your Side".

== Track listing ==
All tracks are written by Daniel Bedingfield, with additional writing by Solid Rock (raps on "Blown It Again" and "Right Girl") and Henry Mancini (via samples of Mancini's "Peter Gunn Theme", as performed by The Blues Brothers, on "Inflate My Ego").

UK and European edition
No.	Title	Producer(s)	Length
1.	"Blown It Again"	Daniel Bedingfield; Ali Staton; Al Stone^{[a]}	3:20
2.	"James Dean (I Wanna Know)"	Bedingfield; Stone^{[b]}	3:40
3.	"Gotta Get Thru This"	Bedingfield; D&D Productions	2:45
4.	"Right Girl"	Bedingfield; Stone^{[b]}	3:55
5.	"If You're Not the One"	Mark Taylor	4:19
6.	"He Don't Love You Like I Love You"	Daniel Bedingfield; Ali Staton; Stone^{[a]}; Stephen Emmanuel^{[a]}	3:57
7.	"I Can't Read You"	Bedingfield; Emmanuel^{[b]}	4:06
8.	"Friday"	Bedingfield; Stone^{[b]}	3:30
9.	"Honest Questions"	Taylor	3:34
10.	"Girlfriend"	Bedingfield; Staton^{[b]}; Stone^{[a]}	3:12
11.	"Without the Girl"	Bedingfield; Staton	3:48
12.	"Inflate My Ego"	Bedingfield; Stone^{[b]}; Martin Newman^{[a]}	5:05
13.	"Gotta Get Thru This" (acoustic version)	Bedingfield; Stone	3:40

Re-release bonus tracks
No.	Title	Producer(s)	Length
14.	"Never Gonna Leave Your Side"	Taylor; Bedingfield^{[a]}	3:56
15.	"James Dean (I Wanna Know)" (acoustic version)	Bedingfield; Staton	3:00
16.	"If You're Not the One" (acoustic version)	Bedingfield; Staton	4:17

North American edition
No.	Title	Producer(s)	Length
1.	"Blown It Again"	Daniel Bedingfield; Ali Staton; Al Stone^{[a]}	3:20
2.	"James Dean (I Wanna Know)"	Bedingfield; Stone^{[b]}	3:40
3.	"Gotta Get Thru This" (D'n'D radio edit)	Bedingfield; D&D Productions	2:42
4.	"If You're Not the One"	Mark Taylor	4:19
5.	"He Don't Love You Like I Love You"	Daniel Bedingfield; Ali Staton; Stone^{[a]}; Stephen Emmanuel^{[a]}	3:57
6.	"I Can't Read You"	Bedingfield; Emmanuel^{[b]}	4:06
7.	"Friday"	Bedingfield; Stone^{[b]}	3:30
8.	"Honest Questions"	Taylor	3:34
9.	"Girlfriend"	Bedingfield; Staton^{[b]}; Stone^{[a]}	3:12
10.	"Without the Girl"	Bedingfield; Staton	3:46
11.	"Inflate My Ego"	Bedingfield; Stone^{[b]}; Martin Newman^{[a]}	5:05
12.	"Gotta Get Thru This" (acoustic version)	Bedingfield; Stone	3:55

Notes

- ^{^[a]} signifies an additional producer.
- ^{^[b]} signifies a co-producer.

== Personnel ==
- Daniel Bedingfield – primary artist, guitar, producer, composer
- Miles Bould – percussion
- Danny Cummings – percussion
- Ned Douglas – engineer, producer, programming
- Stephen Emmanuel – mixing, producer
- Leo Green – saxophone
- Isobel Griffiths – orchestra contractor
- Matt Holland – trumpet
- Greg Lester – guitar
- Christian Saint Val – assistant
- Derrick Santini – photography
- Robin Smith – conductor, string arrangements
- The Solid Rock Choir – composer
- Ali Staton – producer
- Al Stone – mixing, producer
- Jeff Taylor – remixing
- Lewis Taylor – bass, guitar, Hammond organ
- Jong Uk-yoon – assistant

== Charts ==
=== Weekly charts ===
Chart (2002)	Peak position
Australian Albums (ARIA)	39
Danish Albums (Hitlisten)	3
Dutch Albums (Album Top 100)	23
Irish Albums (IRMA)	14
New Zealand Albums (RMNZ)	19
Norwegian Albums (VG-lista)	25
Scottish Albums (OCC)	2
Swedish Albums (Sverigetopplistan)	33
UK Albums (OCC)	2
US Billboard 200	41

=== Year-end charts ===
Chart (2002)	Position
UK Albums (OCC)	62
Chart (2003)	Position
UK Albums (OCC)	5
Chart (2004)	Position
UK Albums (OCC)	104

== Certifications ==
Region	Certification	Certified units/sales
New Zealand (RMNZ)	Gold	7,500^{^}
United Kingdom (BPI)	5× Platinum	1,630,000
United States (RIAA)	Gold	500,000^{^}
Summaries
Europe (IFPI)	Platinum	1,000,000^{*}
^{*} Sales figures based on certification alone.^{^} Shipments figures based on certification alone.
