= Stop the Traffik – Secret Fear =

2012 EP by Daniel Bedingfield

EP by Daniel Bedingfield
- Released: 5 July 2013
- Recorded: 2011–2013
- Genre: Pop; pop rock; R&B
- Length: 24:53
- Label: UHT Productions

Daniel Bedingfield chronology
Second First Impression (2004)	Stop the Traffik – Secret Fear (2013)

Singles from Stop the Traffik – Secret Fear
- 1. "Rocks Off" Released: 13 March 2012; 2. "Don't Write Me Off" Released: 12 February 2013

Stop the Traffik – Secret Fear is an EP released by English-New Zealand singer Daniel Bedingfield in 2012. It was re-released in 2013 as a Special Edition with several track changes. "Rocks Off" was released as a single accompanied by "It's Not Me It's You". "Don't Write Me Off" was also released as a single, accompanied by "Secret Fear". Romanian band Dirty Shirt included a cover of "Rocks Off" on their album Freak Show.

== Secret Fear ==
"Secret Fear" is the lead track from the EP. The music video, released on YouTube and Vimeo in October 2012, has won several awards.

== Track listing ==
The EP has been released a total of three times. The track listing below represents the final release (which contains all tracks from the two previous releases as well as new material). The first release occurred on 24 April 2012. The second release was made on the same day but was exclusive to iTunes. The special edition release was made available on 5 July 2013.

No.	Title	Writer(s)	Length
1.	"Secret Fear"	Daniel Bedingfield	3:54
2.	"O.V.E.R.U."	Bedingfield	3:40
3.	"Rocks Off" (interlude)	Bedingfield	1:09
4.	"It's Not Me It's You"	Bedingfield	3:19
5.	"Don't Write Me Off"	Bedingfield	4:09
6.	"Way with Words" (interlude)	Bedingfield	1:22
7.	"You Put Me Down"	Bedingfield	3:53
8.	"Naysayer"	Bedingfield	4:11
9.	"Every Little Thing"	Bedingfield, Martin Smith	4:27
10.	"Way with Words" (Live)	Bedingfield	3:13

== Music videos ==
Music videos have been released for "Secret Fear" and "Rocks Off".
