= Sofía Usandizaga =

Argentine sailor

Personal information
- Born: 1 November 1970 (age 54); Bariloche, Argentina

Sport
- Sport: Sailing

Sofía Usandizaga (born 1 November 1970) is an Argentine sailor. She competed in the women's 470 event at the 1996 Summer Olympics.
