= The Way (Daniel Bedingfield song) =

2005 single by Daniel Bedingfield

Single by Daniel Bedingfield

from the album Second First Impression
- Released: 23 May 2005
- Length: 3:17
- Label: Polydor
- Songwriter(s): Daniel Bedingfield
- Producer(s): Daniel Bedingfield, Jack Joseph Puig

Daniel Bedingfield singles chronology
"Wrap My Words Around You" (2005)	"The Way" (2005)	"Rocks Off" (2012)

"The Way" is a song by New Zealand-British singer Daniel Bedingfield. It was released on 23 May 2005 as the third and final single from his second studio album, Second First Impression (2004). It was written by Bedingfield and produced by Bedingfield and Jack Puig.

The song peaked at number 41 on the UK Singles Chart.

== Track listings ==
- UK CD1
1. "The Way" - 3:19
2. "Ain't Nobody" (duet with Natasha, live at the Brits) - 3:50
- UK CD2
1. "The Way" - 3:19
2. "Somebody Told Me" (Live from Radio 1) - 2:51
3. "Holiness" (Re-Vocal version) - 6:41
4. "The Way" (Music video) - 3:19

== Charts ==
Chart (2005)	Peak position
Scotland (OCC)	35
UK Singles (OCC)	41
