= If You're Not the One =

2002 single by Daniel Bedingfield

- Standard cover art; Australian single uses orange font

Single by Daniel Bedingfield

from the album Gotta Get Thru This
- B-side: "James Dean (I Wanna Know)" (acoustic); "Album Snippets Medley"
- Released: 25 November 2002
- Studio: Metrophonic (London, England)
- Genre: Pop
- Length: 4:19
- Label: Polydor
- Songwriter: Daniel Bedingfield
- Producer: Mark Taylor

Daniel Bedingfield singles chronology
"James Dean (I Wanna Know)" (2002)	"If You're Not the One" (2002)	"I Can't Read You" (2003)

Audio sample
- Daniel Bedingfield - "If You're Not the One": file; help

Alternative covers
- American cover

Alternative cover
- French re-issue cover

"If You're Not the One" is a song by New Zealand-British singer Daniel Bedingfield. It was released on 25 November 2002 as the third single from his debut studio album, Gotta Get Thru This (2002). The single entered the top 20 on the majority of charts that it appeared on, including becoming a number-one hit on the UK Singles Chart and reaching number 15 on the US Billboard Hot 100.

== Background and writing ==
"If You're Not the One" is written as a love ballad. Bedingfield claimed he was inspired by Irish boy band Westlife when writing and recording the song, admitting that he believed that the song is "cheesy." Bedingfield admitted he began writing the song because he realized that material he considered more "complex" was unlikely to get him a record deal. "Commercialism, sappy lyrics and meek tunes are the things I hate most in the universe, but I'm not sure even Bob Dylan could get record company interest without hooks these days", Bedingfield recalled in an interview with The Daily Telegraph. "It's a different age. You need to go some kind of populist route. So, about three years ago, I sat down with a Westlife song and tried to write something similar."

Bedingfield also admitted that he did not even want to put the song on his album Gotta Get Thru This. He said, "I didn't want to put "If You're Not the One" on the album as I thought it was too cheesy. I thought it sounded like Westlife. But she (Natasha Bedingfield, his sister) loved it. Women that hear it go all soft and think it's lovely".

== Composition ==
"If You're Not the One" plays for 4 minutes and 19 seconds, in common time. It is in the key of B-flat major, and the chorus features Bedingfield singing falsetto, where he hits the note E♭5.

== Critical reception ==
"If You're Not the One" received mixed reviews from contemporary music critics. On the positive side, Peter Robinson, in the Gotta Get Thru This album review for the NME, wrote "'If You're Not the One' [recalls] every chart-mauling uber-ballad you've ever heard". Nedd Raggett of AllMusic commented in his album review "When it comes to ballads, they work best in sudden moments – the soaring end to 'If You're Not the One'". About.com ranked the song at number 27 on its list of the 'Top 100 Pop Songs of 2002', two places behind the album's title track. The song was again ranked at number 27 on the 2003 list, due to it being released in the United States during that year. Music Week felt that the song showed Bedingfield's "sensitive side", and that the song "showcases his vocal range to stunning effect." The magazine even considered it "beautifully crafted."

However, the track also received some negative feedback. PopMatters' Nikki Tranter wrote "surely you would think with his obviously overwhelming ability to compose utter claptrap cleverly disguised as serious prophesizing, his lyrics might contain something a little more expressive than 'If you're not the one / Why does my heart feel glad today / If you're not the one / Then why does my hand fit yours this way.'" In his review for musicOMH, Michael Hubbard was even less positive, stating, "'If You're Not the One' is as vomit-inducing as anything the man in the plastic mask has ever wretched (sic) forth at the world".

== Chart performance ==
When the song was released as a single, it was picked up by radio stations. It was the most added pop song on the radio for the week of 20 February 2003. In the US, the song was the most added song in the Adult Contemporary market for the week of 7 April 2003. In the US, the song was his highest debuting single, debuting at number 55 on the Billboard Hot 100. The single proved to be a successful release for Bedingfield, providing him with several worldwide number ones and reaching the top 20 in all but one of the charts that it appeared on. It debuted at number one in the UK Singles Chart, knocking Christina Aguilera and Redman's "Dirrty" from the top spot.

== Music video ==
The music video was produced by A1 singer Mark Read. It begins with a series of images of Bedingfield singing in various positions against a black backdrop. When the chorus starts he is seen singing with clouds in the background. The initial sequence is repeated for the second verse. However, half-way through, he starts to write on a wall. The rest of the song follows the same pattern.

For the US market, a separate video was made. This version features Bedingfield singing the song while drunk one night after a house party, trying to remember who "the one" is. Several of his and the woman's scenes are shown in split-screen format, and exactly match one another. In the end, it is morning, and she returns to him.

== Track listings ==
UK CD single and Australian CD1

1. "If You're Not the One" – 4:16
2. "James Dean (I Wanna Know)" (acoustic version) – 2:56
3. "If You're Not the One" (Metro mix) – 6:37
4. "If You're Not the One" (video) – 4:16

UK cassette single and European CD single

1. "If You're Not the One" – 4:16
2. "If You're Not the One" (Metro mix) – 6:37

US CD single

1. "If You're Not the One" (radio edit)
2. "If You're Not the One" (Metro edit)
3. "Album Snippets Medley"

US 12-inch single

A1. "If You're Not the One" (The Passengerz Girlfriend club mix) – 7:09
A2. "If You're Not the One" (Metro remix) – 6:35
B1. "If You're Not the One" (The Passengerz Girlfriend dub) – 5:55
B2. "If You're Not the One" (Seth Lawrence Future dub) – 6:26

Australian CD2

1. "If You're Not the One" (radio edit)
2. "If You're Not the One" (Metro mix edit)
3. "James Dean (I Wanna Know)" (ATFC's Committed vocal) – 2:56
4. "Gotta Get Thru This" (video)
5. "If You're Not the One" (Metro mix video)

== Credits and personnel ==
Credits are lifted from the Gotta Get Thru This album booklet.

Studios

- Recorded and mixed at Metrophonic Studios (London, England)
- Strings recorded at Angel Recording Studios (London, England)
- Mastered at Sony Music Studios (London, England)

Personnel

- Daniel Bedingfield – writing, additional production
- Adam Philips – guitar
- Danny Cummings – drums
- Gavyn Wright – concertmaster
- Robin Smith – string arrangement, conducting
- Mark Taylor – string arrangement, production, recording, mixing
- Isobel Griffiths – orchestral contracting
- Christian Saint Val – recording and mixing assistant
- Jong Uk Yoon – recording and mixing assistant
- Steve Pryce – engineering
- Mat Bartram – engineering assistant
- John Davis – mastering

== Charts ==
=== Weekly charts ===
Chart (2002–2003)	Peak position
Australia (ARIA)	14
Austria (Ö3 Austria Top 40)	49
Belgium (Ultratop 50 Flanders)	28
Canada (Nielsen SoundScan)	6
Denmark (Tracklisten)	1
Europe (European Hot 100)	9
France (SNEP)	18
Germany (GfK)	38
Ireland (IRMA)	2
Netherlands (Dutch Top 40)	13
Netherlands (Single Top 100)	11
New Zealand (Recorded Music NZ)	2
Norway (VG-lista)	4
Scottish Singles Sales (Official Charts)	4
Sweden (Sverigetopplistan)	4
Switzerland (Schweizer Hitparade)	69
UK Singles (Official Charts)	1
US Billboard Hot 100	15
US Adult Contemporary (Billboard)	3
US Adult Pop Airplay (Billboard)	17
US Dance Club Songs (Billboard) Metro, Passengerz, Mantese, S. Lawrence Mixes	4
US Dance Singles Sales (Billboard) Remixes	1
US Dance Airplay (Billboard)	3
US Pop Airplay (Billboard)	7
US Adult Contemporary (Radio & Records)	3
US CHR/Pop (Radio & Records)	7
US Hot AC (Radio & Records)	16

=== Year-end charts ===
Chart (2002)	Position
Ireland (IRMA)	78
UK Singles (OCC)	25

Chart (2003)	Position
Australia (ARIA)	73
Belgium (Ultratop 50 Flanders)	92
Ireland (IRMA)	13
Netherlands (Dutch Top 40)	30
Netherlands (Single Top 100)	36
New Zealand (RIANZ)	7
Sweden (Hitlistan)	18
UK Singles (OCC)	35
US Billboard Hot 100	60
US Adult Contemporary (Billboard)	9
US Adult Top 40 (Billboard)	46
US Dance Singles Sales (Billboard)	3
US Mainstream Top 40 (Billboard)	38
US Adult Contemporary (Radio & Records)	10
US CHR/Pop (Radio & Records)	33
US Hot AC (Radio & Records)	47

Chart (2004)	Position
US Dance Radio Airplay (Billboard)	47
US Adult Contemporary (Radio & Records)	25

=== Decade-end charts ===
Chart (2000–2009)	Position
UK Singles (OCC)	78

== Certifications ==
Region	Certification	Certified units/sales
Australia (ARIA)	Gold	35,000^{^}
Denmark (IFPI Danmark)	Gold	4,000^{^}
Norway (IFPI Norway)	Platinum	10,000^{*}
United Kingdom (BPI)	Platinum	600,000^{‡}
^{*} Sales figures based on certification alone.^{^} Shipments figures based on certification alone.^{‡} Sales+streaming figures based on certification alone.

== Release history ==
Region	Date	Format(s)	Label(s)	Ref.
United Kingdom	25 November 2002	CD; cassette	Polydor	
Australia	13 January 2003	CD1	Polydor	
United States	17 February 2003	Contemporary hit radio	Island	
Australia	24 February 2003	CD2	Polydor	
