= Louise Cole =

Irish sailor

Personal information
- Nationality: Irish
- Born: 11 July 1974 (age 52)

Sport
- Sport: Sailing

Louise Cole (born 11 July 1974) is an Irish sailor. She competed in the women's 470 event at the 1996 Summer Olympics.
