= Nothing Hurts Like Love =

2004 single by Daniel Bedingfield

Single by Daniel Bedingfield

from the album Second First Impression
- B-side: "A Kiss Without Commitment" (demo)
- Released: 25 October 2004
- Length: 3:07
- Label: Polydor
- Songwriter: Diane Warren
- Producer: Jack Joseph Puig

Daniel Bedingfield singles chronology
"Friday" (2003)	"Nothing Hurts Like Love" (2004)	"Wrap My Words Around You" (2005)

"Nothing Hurts Like Love" is the lead single from New Zealand-British singer Daniel Bedingfield's second studio album, Second First Impression (2004). It peaked at number three on the UK Singles Chart and number seven on the Danish Singles Chart.

== Track listings ==
UK CD single

1. "Nothing Hurts Like Love"
2. "A Kiss Without Commitment" (demo)
3. "Nothing Hurts Like Love" (Poet's remix)

European CD single

1. "Nothing Hurts Like Love"
2. "A Kiss Without Commitment" (demo)

== Personnel ==
Personnel are lifted from the UK CD single liner notes.

- Diane Warren – writing
- Daniel Bedingfield – vocals, co-production, design concept
- Eric Appapoulay – guitar
- The Fire Department – bass guitar, drums, programming
- Kenneth Crouch – piano
- Randy Curber – piano
- Luis Conte – percussion
- David Campbell – string arrangement
- Dean Nelson – additional engineering
- Dan Chase – additional engineering
- Tal Herzberg – additional engineering
- Jack Joseph Puig – production, mixing, engineering
- Stylorouge – design and art direction
- Sacha Waldman – photography

== Charts ==
=== Weekly charts ===
Chart (2004)	Peak position
Denmark (Tracklisten)	7
Europe (Eurochart Hot 100)	10
Ireland (IRMA)	30
Scotland Singles (OCC)	3
UK Singles (OCC)	3

=== Year-end charts ===
Chart (2004)	Position
UK Singles (OCC)	150
