= Wrap My Words Around You =

2005 single by Daniel Bedingfield

Single by Daniel Bedingfield

from the album Second First Impression
- B-side: "Do Ya", "Growing Up"
- Released: 7 February 2005
- Studio: Ocean Way (Hollywood, California)
- Length: 3:10
- Label: Polydor
- Songwriter(s): Daniel Bedingfield
- Producer(s): Jack Joseph Puig

Daniel Bedingfield singles chronology
"Nothing Hurts Like Love" (2004)	"Wrap My Words Around You" (2005)	"The Way" (2005)

"Wrap My Words Around You" is the second single from New Zealand-British singer Daniel Bedingfield's second studio album, Second First Impression (2004). It peaked at number 12 on the UK Singles Chart and number 30 on both the Irish and Swiss charts.

== Track listings ==
UK CD1 and European CD single

1. "Wrap My Words Around You"
2. "Do Ya" (album version with Lionel Richie)

UK CD2

1. "Wrap My Words Around You"
2. "Nothing Hurts Like Love" (piano and vocal version)
3. "Wrap My Words Around You" (live from Capital Radio)
4. "Growing Up"

European maxi-CD single

1. "Wrap My Words Around You"
2. "Nothing Hurts Like Love" (piano and vocal version)
3. "Wrap My Words Around You" (live from Capital Radio)
4. "Do Ya" (with Lionel Richie)

== Credits and personnel ==
Credits are lifted from the UK CD1 liner notes.

Studios

- Recorded and mixed at Ocean Way Studios (Hollywood, California)
- Mastered at Gateway Mastering (Portland, Maine, US)

Personnel

- Daniel Bedingfield – writing, vocals, beatboxing, programming, co-production, analogue and digital engineering
- Tim Pierce – guitars
- David Hart – guitars
- Eric Appapoulay – guitars
- Paul Bushnell – bass
- Adam Dietch – keyboards
- Erick Coomes – keyboards
- Russ Miller – drums
- Dan Chase – tambourine
- Tyler Coomes – programming
- Poet Named Life – programming
- Jack Joseph Puig – production, recording, mixing, analogue and digital engineering
- Dean Nelson – analogue and digital engineering
- Dan Chase – analogue and digital engineering
- Jake Davies – analogue and digital engineering
- Tal Herzberg – analogue and digital engineering
- Allen Sides – analogue and digital engineering
- Andy Bird – analogue and digital engineering
- Bob Ludwig – mastering

== Charts ==
Chart (2005)	Peak position
Belgium (Ultratip Bubbling Under Flanders)	5
Ireland (IRMA)	30
Netherlands (Dutch Top 40 Tipparade)	10
Netherlands (Single Top 100)	80
Romania (Romanian Top 100)	86
Scotland (OCC)	12
Switzerland (Schweizer Hitparade)	30
UK Singles (OCC)	12
