= Bethan Raggatt =

British sailor

Personal information
- Nationality: British
- Born: 10 September 1966 (age 60) London, England

Sport
- Sport: Sailing

Bethan Raggatt (born 10 September 1966) is a British sailor. She competed in the women's 470 event at the 1996 Summer Olympics.
