= Boel Bengtsson =

Swedish sailor

Personal information
- Full name: Boel Katarina Bengtsson
- Nationality: Swedish
- Born: 27 May 1972 (age 54) Mölnlycke, Sweden

Sport
- Sport: Sailing

Boel Bengtsson (born 27 May 1972) is a Swedish sailor. She competed in the women's 470 event at the 1996 Summer Olympics. She has won two 420 ladies world championships [1989 and 1993].
