= Every Little Thing (Delirious? song) =

2004 single by Delirious?

Single by Delirious?

from the album World Service
- Released: 14 September 2004
- Recorded: 2003
- Genre: Rock
- Length: 4:35
- Label: Furious?
- Songwriters: Stuart Garrard; Martin Smith
- Producers: Julian Kindred; Delirious?

Delirious? singles chronology
"Inside Outside" (2004)	"Every Little Thing" (2004)	"Paint The Town Red" (2005)

"Every Little Thing" is a song written and performed by English Christian rock band Delirious?. The song was the second radio single released to the German market from the band's 2003 studio album, World Service. The song features guest backing vocals by Daniel Bedingfield. The single peaked at #2 on the Südwestrundfunk, which is the southwest region broadcasting's singles chart.

== Track listing ==
1. "Every Little Thing" (Radio Hit Mix)
2. "Every Little Thing" (Radio Ballad Mix)
3. "Every Little Thing" (Radio Remix)
4. "Every Little Thing" (Album Version)
5. "Free"

== Daniel Bedingfield Release ==
"Every Little Thing"

Song by Daniel Bedingfield

from the EP Stop the Traffik – Secret Fear
- Length: 4:27 (album version); 3:35 (radio edit)
- Songwriters: Stuart Garrard; Martin Smith; Daniel Bedingfield

Daniel Bedingfield released his own version of "Every Little Thing" on his EP Stop the Traffik – Secret Fear on 5 July 2013, featuring several lyric changes. Bedingfield performed the song on the New Zealand edition of The X Factor on 8 July 2013, and on the X Factor Around the World special in Indonesia on 24 August 2013.
