= Louise Van Voorhis =

American yacht racer

Louise Van Voorhis (born 4 July 1970) is an American yacht racer who competed in the 1992 (as an alternate) and 1996 Summer Olympics, where she finished in 4th place in the 470 class crewing for Kris Stookey (then Kris Farrar).

== Early life ==
Van Voorhis began sailing in small boats as a child on Martha's Vineyard. For high school she went to Hotchkiss School and raced against Stookey who was a student at the Kent School. In college they continued the rivalry with Van Voorhis at Yale and Stookey at Brown. Van Voorhis and Stookey won the 1996 Olympic Trials and went on to place 4th at the Olympics in Atlanta.

Van Voorhis sailed with Tracy Hayley in a bid for a spot in the 2000 Olympics in the 470 class, but did not qualify for the Olympics.
