= Kris Stookey =

American yacht racer

Personal information
- Nickname: Kris
- Born: Kristina Farrar; 30 June 1969 (age 57)

Sailing career
- Sport: Sailing
- College team: Brown University

Kris Stookey (born June 30, 1969) is an American yacht racer who competed in the 1996 Summer Olympics.

== Sailing history ==
Stookey sailed in college at Brown University where she won All-American honors four times, first as a Women's All American in 1988, then as Honorable Mention in the Coed Group in 1989, and finally as All American in 1990 and 1991. In 1988, Stookey won the Madeleine Cup for winning skipper of the 'A' division in the Inter-Collegiate Sailing Association's Women's Championship. In 1991, Stookey helped the Brown team to earning the Leonard M. Fowle Trophy for the best overall collegiate team in sailing, the first time an Ivy League college won the award.

Stookey placed second at the 1992 Olympic trials in the 470 class sailing with Louise Van Voorhis, and won the 1996 Olympic 470 trials again sailing with Van Voorhis. They went on to win fourth place at the 1996 Summer Olympics.

== Awards and honors ==
Stookey graduated high school from Kent School in 1987 and in 2012 was nominated into their Hall of Fame for her accomplishments in sailing.
