= Gotta Get Thru This (song) =

2001 single by Daniel Bedingfield

Single by Daniel Bedingfield

from the album Gotta Get Thru This
- Released: 26 November 2001
- Genre: UK garage
- Length: 2:42
- Label: Relentless
- Songwriter: Daniel Bedingfield
- Producers: Daniel Bedingfield; D'n'D Productions

Daniel Bedingfield singles chronology
"Gotta Get Thru This" (2001)	"James Dean (I Wanna Know)" (2002)

"Gotta Get Thru This" is a song by New Zealand-British singer Daniel Bedingfield. It was released in November 2001 as Bedingfield's debut single and as the lead single from his first studio album, Gotta Get Thru This (2002). The track, along with some others, was recorded in Bedingfield's bedroom with his PC and a microphone, using the music software Reason.

The single went to number one on the UK Singles Chart in both 2001 and 2002, making it one of Bedingfield's most successful singles on the chart. Outside the United Kingdom, the single peaked within the top ten of the charts in Australia, Canada and the United States, becoming Bedingfield's highest charting U.S. hit. It received a Grammy Award nomination for Best Dance Recording but lost to "Days Go By" by Dirty Vegas. The single became Britain's sixteenth biggest-selling single of 2001 and has since been certified double platinum. Capital Xtra included the song on their list of "The Best Old-School Garage Anthems of All Time".

== Song background ==
Bedingfield was inspired to write the song while walking across Tower Bridge in London, frustrated at being separated from a girl he was in love with from Leeds, in the north of England. The girl was a red-haired American dancer named Gina, and he was upset that the distance between them was preventing him from pursuing her. Bedingfield went home and recorded the song in his bedroom with a microphone plugged into his home computer using the Making Waves audio program. The song cost £1,500 to record, and after pressing some of his own copies of the song, Bedingfield sent them to various DJs, and DJ EZ included it on a compilation. After hearing it, Polydor signed him, and the song became a big hit.

== Music video ==
The music video features Bedingfield looking for a woman in a number of locations in London, most notably West India Quay, a bridge connecting West India to Canary Wharf, and the Canary Wharf Docklands area. He is pursuing a woman he may know and comes inches close while chasing her around Docklands Light Railway, and eventually meets her at Canary Wharf. Canadian director Little X directed the video.

A second version of the video, also directed by Little X, was created for North America. It was filmed in and around the St. James Town neighbourhood in downtown Toronto. In the beginning of the North American music video, an acoustic version of "Gotta Get Thru This" is featured and then the official D'n'D version starts playing after.

== Track listings ==
UK CD single

1. "Gotta Get Thru This" (D'n'D radio edit)
2. "Gotta Get Thru This" (D'n'D full length version)
3. "Gotta Get Thru This" (Stella Browne vocal mix)
4. "Gotta Get Thru This" (CD-ROM video)

UK 12-inch single

A1. "Gotta Get Thru This" (D'n'D full length version)
B1. "Gotta Get Thru This" (original version)
B2. "Gotta Get Thru This" (Stella Browne vocal mix)

UK cassette single

1. "Gotta Get Thru This" (D'n'D radio edit)
2. "Gotta Get Thru This" (D'n'D full length version)

European CD single

1. "Gotta Get Thru This" (D'n'D radio edit) – 2:41
2. "Gotta Get Thru This" (CD-ROM video)

Canadian CD single

1. "Gotta Get Thru This" (D'n'D radio edit) – 2:41
2. "Gotta Get Thru This" (D'n'D full length version) – 4:44
3. "Gotta Get Thru This" (Stella Browne vocal mix) – 7:33

Australian CD single

1. "Gotta Get Thru This" (radio edit) – 2:41
2. "Gotta Get Thru This" (D'n'D full length version) – 4:39
3. "Gotta Get Thru This" (Stella Browne vocal mix) – 7:33
4. "Gotta Get Thru This" (original version) – 4:31

== Charts ==
=== Weekly charts ===
Weekly chart performance for "Gotta Get Thru This"
Chart (2001–2002)	Peak position
Australia (ARIA)	10
Australian Dance (ARIA)	2
Belgium (Ultratop 50 Flanders)	27
Canada (Nielsen SoundScan)	5
Denmark (Tracklisten)	14
Europe (Eurochart Hot 100)	8
France (SNEP)	49
Germany (GfK)	72
Ireland (IRMA)	15
Ireland Dance (IRMA)	5
Netherlands (Dutch Top 40)	14
Netherlands (Single Top 100)	32
New Zealand (Recorded Music NZ)	12
Romania (Romanian Top 100)	56
Scottish Singles Sales (Official Charts)	7
Switzerland (Schweizer Hitparade)	92
UK Singles (Official Charts)	1
UK Airplay (Music Week)	1
UK Dance (Official Charts)	1
UK Hip Hop/R&B (Official Charts)	1
US Billboard Hot 100	10
US Dance Club Songs (Billboard) The Passengerz & Stella Browne mixes	1
US Dance Singles Sales (Billboard)	16
US Dance Airplay (Billboard)	15
US Pop Airplay (Billboard)	3
US Rhythmic Airplay (Billboard)	14
US CHR/Pop (Radio & Records)	3
US CHR/Rhythmic (Radio & Records)	24

=== Year-end charts ===
2001 year-end chart performance for "Gotta Get Thru This"
Chart (2001)	Position
UK Singles (OCC)	16

2002 year-end chart performance for "Gotta Get Thru This"
Chart (2002)	Position
Australia (ARIA)	89
Australian Dance (ARIA)	16
Canada (Nielsen SoundScan)	61
Europe (Eurochart Hot 100)	70
UK Singles (OCC)	63
UK Airplay (Music Week)	30
US Billboard Hot 100	61
US Dance Club Play (Billboard)	22
US Mainstream Top 40 (Billboard)	32
US Rhythmic Top 40 (Billboard)	55
US CHR/Pop (Radio & Records)	34
US CHR/Rhythmic (Radio & Records)	88

2003 year-end chart performance for "Gotta Get Thru This"
Chart (2003)	Position
Brazil (Crowley)	70
US CHR/Pop (Radio & Records)	60

=== Decade-end charts ===
Decade-end chart performance for "Gotta Get Thru This"
Chart (2000–2009)	Position
UK Top 100 Songs of the Decade	61

== Certifications ==
Certifications and sales for "Gotta Get Thru This"
Region	Certification	Certified units/sales
Australia (ARIA)	Gold	35,000^{^}
New Zealand (RMNZ)	Gold	15,000^{‡}
United Kingdom (BPI)	2× Platinum	1,200,000^{‡}
^{^} Shipments figures based on certification alone.^{‡} Sales+streaming figures based on certification alone.

== Release history ==
Release dates and formats for "Gotta Get Thru This"
Region	Date	Format(s)	Label(s)	Ref.
United Kingdom	26 November 2001	12-inch vinyl; CD; cassette	Relentless	
Australia	11 February 2002	CD	Ministry of Sound	
Canada	23 April 2002	CD	Jive	
United States	1 July 2002	Rhythmic contemporary; contemporary hit radio	Island	

== See also ==
- List of UK Singles Chart number ones of 2001
- List of UK Singles Chart number ones of 2002
- List of number-one dance singles of 2002 (U.S.)
