= James Dean (I Wanna Know) =

2002 single by Daniel Bedingfield

Single by Daniel Bedingfield

from the album Gotta Get Thru This
- Released: 12 August 2002
- Studio: Metropolis (London, England)
- Genre: Dance-pop; bedroom pop
- Length: 3:40
- Label: Polydor
- Songwriter: Daniel Bedingfield
- Producer: Daniel Bedingfield

Daniel Bedingfield singles chronology
"Gotta Get Thru This" (2001)	"James Dean (I Wanna Know)" (2002)	"If You're Not the One" (2002)

"James Dean (I Wanna Know)" is a song by British singer Daniel Bedingfield. It was released on 12 August 2002 as the second single from his debut studio album, Gotta Get Thru This. Like his debut single "Gotta Get Thru This", "James Dean" was also a hit, reaching number four on the UK Singles Chart, making it his second top-10 hit. It entered the top 20 in Australia, peaking at number 19. The song name checks Freddie Mercury, Brad Pitt, Sly Stone, Daddy Warbucks, and James Dean himself.

Dom Passantino of Stylus Magazine described the song as "one final attempt at bedroom bounce-pop weirdness." Tom Ewing of Freaky Trigger found the song's electro to be harsher than on previous efforts.

== Track listings ==
- UK and Australian CD single
1. "James Dean (I Wanna Know)"
2. "Gotta Get Thru This" (acoustic version)
3. "James Dean (I Wanna Know)" (ATFC's committed vocal mix)
4. "James Dean (I Wanna Know)" (video)
- UK 12-inch single

A1. "James Dean (I Wanna Know)" (ATFC's committed vocal)
A2. "James Dean (I Wanna Know)" (M & M vocal mix)
B1. "James Dean (I Wanna Know)" (Todd Edwards Life Line vocal remix)
B2. "James Dean (I Wanna Know)" (Izzy B vocal mix)

- UK cassette single and European CD single
1. "James Dean (I Wanna Know)"
2. "Gotta Get Thru This" (acoustic version)

== Credits and personnel ==
Credits are lifted from the Gotta Get Thru This album booklet.

Studios

- Recorded and mixed at Metropolis Studios (London, England)
- Mastered at Sony Music Studios (London, England)

Personnel

- Daniel Bedingfield – writing, production
- Leo Green – saxophone
- Matt Holland – trumpet
- Al Stone – co-production, mixing
- Ned Douglas – additional programming
- Gavin Goldberg – engineering
- John Davis – mastering

== Charts ==
=== Weekly charts ===
Chart (2002–2003)	Peak position
Australia (ARIA)	20
Europe (Eurochart Hot 100)	23
Ireland (IRMA)	36
New Zealand (Recorded Music NZ)	23
Scottish Singles Sales (Official Charts)	13
UK Singles (Official Charts)	4
UK Dance (Official Charts)	12
US Pop Airplay (Billboard)	36
US CHR/Pop (Radio & Records)	36

=== Year-end charts ===
Chart (2002)	Position
UK Singles (OCC)	108

== Release history ==
Region	Date	Format(s)	Label(s)	Ref.
United Kingdom	12 August 2002	12-inch vinyl; CD; cassette	Polydor	
Australia	12 August 2002	CD	Polydor	
United States	9 December 2002	Contemporary hit; rhythmic contemporary radio	Island	
