= I Wanna Feel =

Single by Secondcity
- Released: 25 May 2014
- Recorded: 2014
- Genre: Deep house
- Length: 3:05
- Label: Speakerbox; Columbia
- Songwriters: Bryce Wilson; Toni Braxton; Adam Fenton; Kenneth Edmonds; Rowan Harrington; Daniel Bedingfield
- Producers: Secondcity; Hal Ritson

Secondcity singles chronology
"I Wanna Feel" (2014)	"What Can I Do" (2014)

"I Wanna Feel" is the debut single by American-born British producer Secondcity, released in May 2014. It contains an interpolation from "You're Makin' Me High" (1996) by Toni Braxton, sung by Kelli-Leigh Henry-Davila, who has previously provided vocals on "I Got U" by Duke Dumont. Daniel Bedingfield sings the male vocals. The song reached number-one in the United Kingdom, and was certified double platinum.

== Critical reception ==
Lewis Corner of Digital Spy gave the song a positive review, stating:

"Drawing upon his heritage, Secondcity's mix of Chicagoan deep house and UK garage beats proves a steadfast blend – but add a subtle Toni Braxton sample and it becomes a chart-topping contender. "I wanna feel your heart and soul inside of me," the interpolated hook – taken from 1996's 'You're Makin' Me High' – earworms over open hats and a slick groove, rubbing its hands together gleefully at the prospect of continual spins this summer. The biggest '90s dance resurgence in over two decades continues to rave, and if this future anthem is anything to go by, Secondcity is poised to become its latest poster boy."

== Music video ==
A music video to accompany the release of "I Wanna Feel" was first released onto YouTube on 25 April 2014 at a total length of three minutes and thirty-one seconds. As of April 2026 it has received over 103 million views.

== Track listing ==
Digital download – single
No.	Title	Length
1.	"I Wanna Feel" (Radio Edit)	3:05

Digital download – EP
No.	Title	Length
1.	"I Wanna Feel" (Brookes Brothers Remix)	4:38
2.	"I Wanna Feel" (Zed Bias Remix)	5:02
3.	"I Wanna Feel" (Patrick Hagenaar Colour Code Club Mix)	5:09
4.	"I Wanna Feel" (Cristoph Remix)	6:53
5.	"I Wanna Feel" (Club Mix)	5:20

== Charts and certifications ==
=== Weekly charts ===
Chart (2014)	Peak position
Belgium (Ultratop 50 Flanders)	9
Belgium (Ultratop 50 Wallonia)	26
Denmark (Tracklisten)	35
Ireland (IRMA)	25
Poland (Dance Top 50)	31
Poland (Video Chart)	3
Scotland Singles (OCC)	2
UK Singles (OCC)	1
UK Dance (OCC)	1
UK Indie (OCC)	1
US Dance Club Songs (Billboard)	2

=== Year-end charts ===
Chart (2014)	Position
Belgium (Ultratop Flanders)	93
UK Singles (Official Charts Company)	78

=== Certifications ===
Region	Certification	Certified units/sales
United Kingdom (BPI)	2× Platinum	1,200,000^{‡}
^{‡} Sales+streaming figures based on certification alone.

== Release history ==
Country	Date	Format	Label
United Kingdom	25 May 2014	Digital download	Speakerbox
United States	8 July 2014	Dance radio	Ministry of Sound
