= Secondcity =

- Born: Rowan Harrington; 28 January 1987 (age 39); Chicago, Illinois, US
- Origin: London, England
- Genres: House
- Occupations: DJ; record producer
- Years active: 2013–present
- Labels: Ministry of Sound; Defected Records

Rowan Harrington (born 28 January 1987), better known by his artist name Secondcity, is a British DJ and record producer, best known for his song "I Wanna Feel", which peaked at number one on the UK Singles Chart.

== Musical career ==
=== Career beginnings ===
Harrington was part of the house duo Taiki & Nulight before leaving to focus on his solo career due to creative differences. His production partner, Erka Chinbayar, has now changed the alias to Taiki Nulight and continues to produce under the moniker.

=== 2014–present: Breakthrough ===
In May 2014, he released his debut single "I Wanna Feel", the song was at number one on the official midweek BBC Radio 1 singles charts after being released on 25 May 2014 and has over 47,000,000 views on YouTube. On 1 June 2014 the song entered the UK Singles Chart and the UK Dance Chart at number 1. He has since been championed by Disclosure and collaborated with Route 94 for the third time. The follow-up single to "I Wanna Feel", titled "What Can I Do", premiered on 26 July 2014 and featured vocals from Ali Love.

In October 2020, he teamed up with Paul Woolford (at the time in the UK top ten with Diplo and Kareen Lomax on a track called "Looking for Me") and Andrea Martin for a track released by Black Butter Records called "All I Want".

== Discography ==
=== Singles ===
==== As lead artist ====
List of singles released with year, artist(s) involved, selected chart positions, certifications and album name.
Title	Year	Peak chart positions						Certifications	Album
Title	Year	UK	UK Dance	BEL (Vl)	DEN	IRE	SCO	Certifications	Album
"I Wanna Feel"	2014	1	1	9	35	25	2	BPI: 2× Platinum	Non-album single
"What Can I Do" (featuring Ali Love)	2014	85	18	56	—	—	—		Non-album single
"All I Want" (with Paul Woolford featuring Andrea Martin)	2020	—	—	—	—	—	—		Non-album single
"—" denotes a single that did not chart or was not released in that territory.
