= Daniel Bedingfield =

New Zealand-British singer (born 1979)

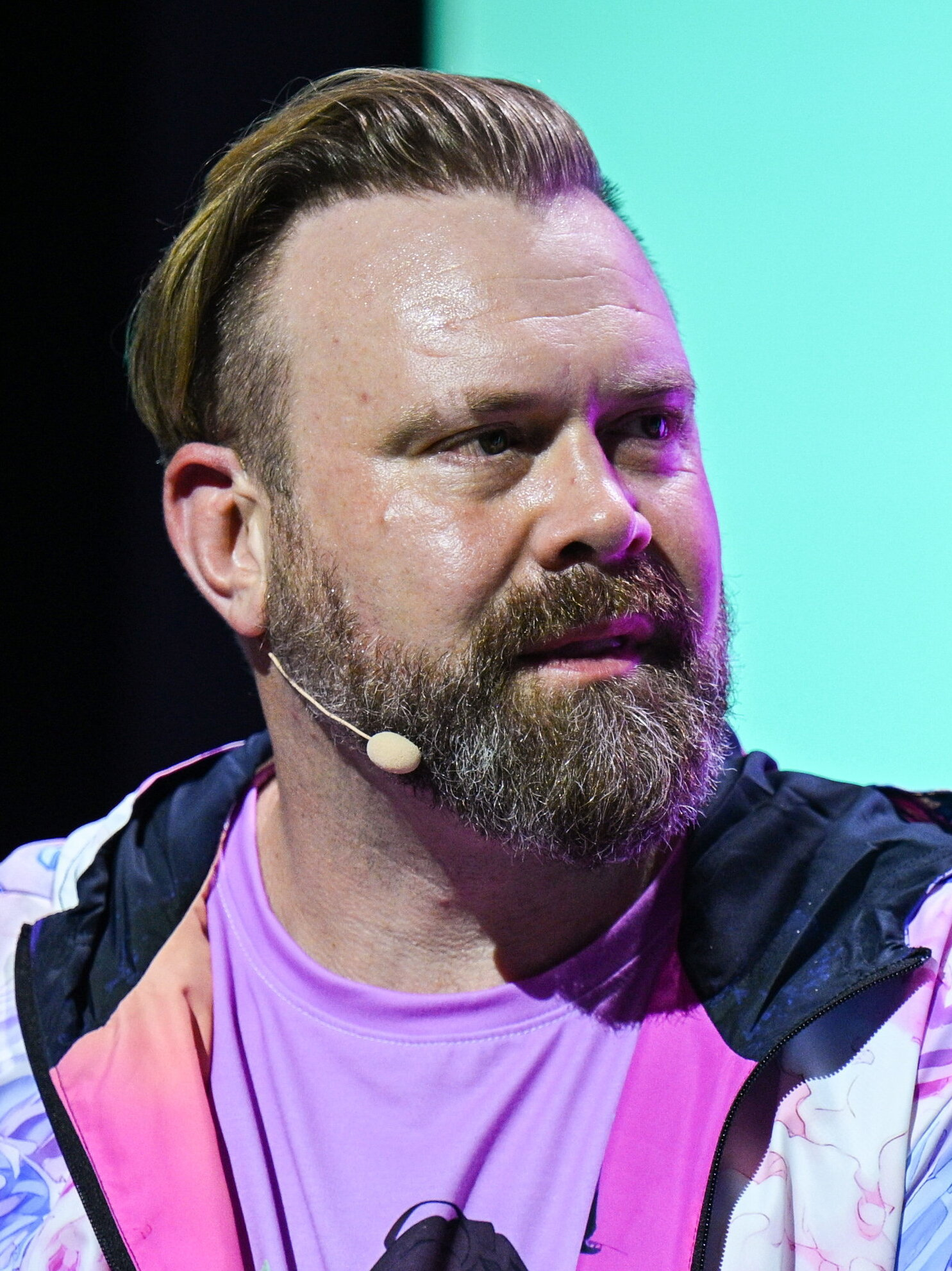
- Bedingfield in 2024

Background information
- Born: Daniel John Bedingfield; 3 December 1979 (age 46); Auckland, New Zealand
- Origin: London, England
- Genres: R&B; pop; garage; rock; blue-eyed soul
- Occupations: Singer; songwriter; record producer; actor
- Instruments: Vocals; keyboards; guitar; programming; beatboxing
- Years active: 2000–present
- Labels: Polydor; Island; UHT; Relentless Records
- Website: danielbedingfield.com

Daniel John Bedingfield (born December 3, 1979) is a New Zealand-British singer, songwriter, record producer and actor. His debut studio album, Gotta Get thru This (2002), spawned three UK number ones, "Gotta Get thru This", "If You're Not the One" and "Never Gonna Leave Your Side", and sold over 4 million copies worldwide. His second album, Second First Impression, was released in 2004. Bedingfield was a judge on The X Factor New Zealand in 2013. He has written songs for other artists and has acted in the West End theatre in London, England.

== Early life ==
Bedingfield was born in Auckland, New Zealand, and attended Lynfield College. He is the elder brother of fellow singers Natasha Bedingfield and Nikola Rachelle. Bedingfield holds dual New Zealand and British citizenship.

== Music career ==
=== 2001–2003: Gotta Get Thru This and international breakthrough ===
He released his first single, "Gotta Get Thru This" in November 2001. It gathered momentum on white label records through the UK garage music scene, and peaked at number one on the UK Singles Chart. He has since had two more number-one singles on the chart, "If You're Not the One" and "Never Gonna Leave Your Side", as well as three further top ten hits. His debut album, also titled Gotta Get Thru This, which was recorded at home using Making Waves Audio software and Reason, peaked at number two on the UK Albums Chart and went on to sell more than 4 million copies worldwide.

=== 2004–2011: Second First Impression and other projects ===
In 2004, Bedingfield won a BRIT Award for Best British Male Artist. He then moved to the Universal Music subsidiary label Polydor Records to release his second album, Second First Impression, which reached number 8 in the UK. The album sold poorly compared to his first offering, though it did include two UK Top 20 singles, "Nothing Hurts Like Love" (which reached number three) and "Wrap My Words Around You" (which peaked at number 12). The third and final single, "The Way", became his first to miss the top 40, reaching number 41. The album was also released in Singapore (featuring 'If You're Not The One' as a bonus track).

Bedingfield performing in 2007

In an interview with the New Zealand Herald in April 2007, Bedingfield said that, after a four-year hiatus, he had three albums recorded and awaiting release.

Since his last release in 2004, Bedingfield continued to work with other artists. He co-wrote the song "Works for Me!" for American Idol finalist David Archuleta. He has also worked with Pixie Lott, and contributed guest vocals on a track by a former member of The Roots. In December 2009, he co-wrote material with Tessanne Chin as well as recorded three songs with Busy Signal at DJ Karim's Stainless Records studios in Kingston, Jamaica. Bedingfield provided backing vocals for the Kirsten Morrell track "He Walked In" from the album Ultraviolet, which was released in May 2010. In December 2010, Bedingfield spent a month in Tel Aviv, Israel, where he wrote and recorded a song with a local freak folk band, The Raw Men Empire. He concluded his visit with a Tel Aviv gig, hosting Uzi Feinerman, The Raw Men Empire and a variety of other Israeli musicians. In July 2011, he recorded on a dancehall riddim called the Overproof Riddim. Like many of the songs on this riddim, it has been getting good rotation in Jamaica.

=== 2012–2016: Stop the Traffik, The X Factor and acting ===
In February 2012, Bedingfield released the single "Rocks Off" with an accompanying video on MTV which can be viewed here. "Rocks Off" was released alongside B-side "It's Not Me, It's You". On 24 April, Bedingfield released the EP Stop the Traffik – Secret Fear, his first EP release since becoming independent. The EP featured both the previously released "Rocks Off" and "It's Not Me, Its You" as well as five other new tracks. The EP was followed by the release of "Secret Fear" as a single, the video features adult scenes and has gone on to win several awards.

On 21 December 2012, Bedingfield took up a role as a judge for the first New Zealand series of The X Factor joining Stan Walker, Melanie Blatt and Ruby Frost. The series premiered on TV3 on 21 April 2013. Bedingfield mentored the Girls category. His sister Natasha appeared as an assistant during the Judges Retreats round. Bedingfield was the winning mentor of series one when his act Jackie Thomas won the competition.

In August 2013, Bedingfield was a judge on the one-off television special X Factor Around the World, alongside Paula Abdul, Louis Walsh, Anggun and Ahmad Dhani. He also performed two of his songs ("If You're Not the One" and "Every Little Thing") on the show.

Bedingfield co-wrote "I Wanna Feel" by SecondCity, which debuted at number one on the UK Singles Chart on 1 June 2014 and stayed in the top 20 for the next six weeks. The song was Bedingfield's fourth number one in the UK. He spent time working in the studio with K-pop group Spica, including co-producing their first English language single "I Did It". He was also the group's vocal director. In 2015, he co-wrote the song "Testify" which was included on The X Factor UK 2014 winner Ben Haenow's self-titled debut studio album.

From February 2016 until April 2016, Bedingfield appeared in the West End musical The War of the Worlds as The Artilleryman.

=== 2024–present: Touring ===
In January 2024, Bedingfield announced a UK tour for April 2024.

On 28 August 2025, Bedingfield released the single "Believer", in collaboration with DJ/producer Aktive. He released "Leave Right Now", in collaboration with Surya Sen and niceboy and Ofra Hazra, on 31 July 2026.

== Personal life ==
While on holiday visiting his parents in New Zealand in 2004, Bedingfield nearly died in a serious car accident, which left him with severe head and neck injuries because of the car rolling on him.

Bedingfield has spoken about experiencing romantic attraction to both men and women. He has also opened up about being autistic.

His mother, Molly Bedingfield, is founder and CEO of Global Angels, for which Daniel is doing fundraising work. Bedingfield also helped to launch the Stop the Traffik coalition against modern day slavery.

== Discography ==
- Gotta Get Thru This (2002)
- Second First Impression (2004)

== Awards and nominations ==
Year	Awards	Category	Work	Result
2002	MOBO Awards	UK Act of the Year	Daniel Bedingfield	Nominated
2002	MOBO Awards	Best Newcomer	Daniel Bedingfield	Nominated
2002	MOBO Awards	Best Garage Act	Daniel Bedingfield	Nominated
2002	Pop Factory Awards	Best Pop Factory Debut	Daniel Bedingfield	Nominated
2002	BRIT Awards	Best British Single	"Gotta Get Thru This"	Nominated
2003	Grammy Awards	Best Dance Recording	"Gotta Get Thru This"	Nominated
2003	BMI London Awards	Award-Winning Song	"Gotta Get Thru This"	Won
2003	DanceStar USA Awards	Record of the Year	"Gotta Get Thru This"	Nominated
2003	International Dance Music Awards	Best Pop Dance Track	"Gotta Get Thru This"	Nominated
2003	International Dance Music Awards	Best New Dance Artist Solo	Daniel Bedingfield	Won
2003	Popjustice £20 Music Prize	Best British Pop Single	"If You're Not the One"	Nominated
2003	The Record of the Year	Record of the Year	"If You're Not the One"	Nominated
2003	Billboard Music Awards	Top Hot Dance Maxi-Single Sales	"If You're Not the One"	Nominated
2003	Billboard Music Awards	Top Hot Dance Maxi-Singles Sales Artist	Daniel Bedingfield	Nominated
2004	Groovevolt Music and Fashion Awards	Best Album - Male	Gotta Get Thru This	Nominated
2004	Groovevolt Music and Fashion Awards	Best Song Performance - Male	"If You're Not the One"	Nominated
2004	BRIT Awards	Best British Male	Daniel Bedingfield	Won
2004	BRIT Awards	Best Pop Act	Daniel Bedingfield	Nominated
2004	BRIT Awards	Best British Album	Gotta Get Thru This	Nominated
2004	ASCAP Pop Music Awards	Most Performed Song	"If You're Not the One"	Won
2004	BMI Pop Awards	Award-Winning Song	"Gotta Get Thru This"	Won
2009	International Dance Music Awards	Best Music Video	"The One" (ft. Sharam)	Nominated
2012	Miami Short Film Festival	Best Music Video	"Secret Fear"	Won
2013	Amsterdam Film Festival	Van Gogh Prize, Special Jury Award	"Secret Fear"	Won
2013	SXSW Film Festival	Best of the Fest	Daniel Bedingfield	Nominated

== See also ==
- List of number-one dance hits (United States)
- List of artists who reached number one on the U.S. dance chart
