= Jeremy Edwardson =

American singer

- Born: Jeremy Edwardson; March 25, 1979 (age 47); Redding, California, United States
- Occupations: Record producer, audio engineer, mixer, songwriter
- Instruments: Vocals, guitar, keyboards
- Website: jeremyedwardson.com

Jeremy Edwardson (born March 25, 1979) is an American singer/songwriter, record producer, audio engineer, mixer, and former lead vocalist of the Seattle-based band, The Myriad. He owns and operates The Soundhouse recording studio in his hometown of Redding, California. Edwardson is a 1997 graduate of Central Valley High School in Shasta Lake, California.

== Discography ==
Year	Artist	Album	"Song"	Notes
2006	Brian & Jenn Johnson	We Believe		Producer, engineer
2008	Jesus Culture	Your Love Never Fails		Producer, engineer
2009	Jesus Culture	Consumed		Producer, engineer
2009	Jake Hamilton	Marked by Heaven		Producer, engineer, mixer
2009	Linda McIntosh	Jacob		Producer, engineer, mixer
2009	Roswick	Dëfa Bia Dëm		Engineer, mixer
2009	Oh Snap It's Luke!	A Boy with a Dream		Engineer, mixer, vocal production
2009	Amberly Thiessen	Final Touches		Producer, engineer, mixer
2009	Kyle Coulliard		"Call Into Season"	Producer, engineer, mixer
2009	Third Day		"Creed"	Engineer, mixer
2010	Kings	Artist		Producer, engineer, mixer
2010	Ian McIntosh		"Obsession"	Producer, engineer, mixer
2010	Eleven22	Fall on Your Altar		Producer, engineer
2010	Jesus Culture	My Passion EP		Producer, engineer
2010	Bethel Music	Here Is Love		Producer, engineer
2010	Brian Johnson	Love Came Down - Live Acoustic Worship in the Studio		Producer, engineer, mixer
2010	Dave Fitzgerald	Hope of Heaven: Live at Bethel Church		Producer, engineer
2010	Leah Mari	All I Have Needed		Producer, engineer
2010	Jesus Culture	Come Away		Producer, engineer
2010	Lakeside Church	God Who Saves the World		Producer, engineer
2011	Harbour Live	Here We Are		Producer, engineer
2011	Bethel Music	Be Lifted High		Producer, engineer
2011	Impuls	Utbryter		Producer, engineer
2011	Oh Snap It's Luke!		"I Don't Want to Push You Away"	Engineer, mixer
2011	The Listening		"Animals"	Engineer
2011	David Walker	Songs of Sons and Lovers		Producer, engineer
2011	Jake Hamilton	Freedom Calling		Producer, engineer
2011	Bryan & Katie Torwalt	Here on Earth		Producer, engineer
2011	Eleven22	The Reason		Producer, engineer
2011	Kings		"Tonight"	Producer, engineer, mixer
2011	Light the Letters	Building a Fire EP		Producer, engineer, mixer
2011	Jesus Culture	Awakening: Live from Chicago		Producer, engineer
2012	Kim Walker-Smith	Still Believe		Producer, engineer
2012	Kings		"King Forevermore"	Producer, engineer, mixer
2012	Kristene DiMarco	Safe Place		Producer, engineer
2012	Repossess Band	Yours Is the Kingdom		Producer, engineer
2012	Chris Molitor	The Dawn EP		Producer, engineer, mixer
2012	Heather Clark	Overcome		Producer, engineer
2012	Jesus Culture	Emerging Voices		Producer, engineer
2012	Aaron Wardle	Afraid to Live EP		Producer, engineer, mixer
2012	Matt Ellenberger	Love & Sacrifice		Producer, engineer
2012	Kim Walker-Smith / Jesus Culture		"Father of Lights"	Producer, engineer, mixer
2012	One Sol	One Sol		Mixer
2012	Chris Molitor	The Dusk EP		Producer, engineer, mixer
2012	Jesus Culture with Martin Smith	Live from New York		Producer, engineer, songwriter ("I Belong to You")
2012	Maggie Ritchie	Something Wonderful: Lullabies from Old Broadway		Producer, engineer, mixer
2012	Rockharbor	RH15		Producer, engineer
2013	Impuls	Gjenklang EP		Producer, engineer
2013	IMI Kirken	Troens Øyne: Live fra IMI Kirken		Producer, engineer
2013	Soulfire Revolution		"Revival"	Producer, engineer
2013	Various Artists	My Hope: Songs Inspired by the Message and Mission of Billy Graham		Producer, engineer
2013	Kari Jobe		"The Cross Is My Confession"	Producer, engineer
2013	Bryan & Katie Torwalt	Kingdom Come		Producer, engineer
2013	Josh & Amberley Klinkenberg	Our Love EP		Producer, engineer
2013	Kristin Horne	Seasons		Producer, engineer, vocals ("The Fire")
2014	Hillsong United	The White Album		Remixer
2014	Hillsong United		"The Stand (Jeremy Edwardson Remix)"	Producer, mix
2014	Kari Jobe	Majestic		Producer, engineer
2014	Andrew Ehrenzeller	Children of Promise		Producer, engineer, mixer
2014	Michael W. Smith	Sovereign		Producer, engineer
2014	Jesus Culture	Unstoppable Love		Producer, engineer
2014	AntiochLIVE	It Is Finished		Producer, engineer
2014	Justin Jarvis	Atmospheres		Producer, engineer
2014	Kim Walker-Smith	When Christmas Comes		Producer, engineer
2014	Stagedive Live	Frikjent EP		Mixer
2015	Kim Walker-Smith & Skyler Smith	Home		Producer, engineer
2015	Derek Johnson	Real Love		Producer, engineer
2015	Jesus Culture	This Is Jesus Culture		Producer, engineer
2015	Jesus Culture	Esto Es Jesús Culture		Producer, engineer
2015	Chris McClarney	Everything and Nothing Less		Producer, engineer
2015	Jon Foreman	The Wonderlands: Shadows		Co-producer ("Ghost Machine"), engineer
2015	Kristene DiMarco	Mighty		Producer, engineer
2015	John Mark McMillan	Live at the Knight		Producer, engineer
2016	Jesus Culture	Let It Echo		Producer, engineer
2016	Chris Quilala	Split the Sky		Producer, engineer, background vocals, keyboards, programming
2017	Kari Jobe	The Garden		Producer, engineer

Ian Mcintosh "Alive" released May 2009 (also credited as mixer)

Jeff Abercrombie "Everything Grace" released April 2009 (also credited as mixer)

Wesley Jensen "Battles" released March 2009 (also credited as mixer)

Sunbears "Dream Happy Dreams" released March 2009 (engineer only)

David Walker "Closer Than Angels) released December 2008

Kristene Mueller "Those Who Dream" released December 2008 (also credited as mixer)

Ian Mcintosh "You Are" Single released October 2008 (also credited as mixer)

The Myriad "With Arrows, With Poise" released May 2008

Wesley Jensen "Stories" released April 2008 (also credited as mixer)

The Myriad "A Clean Shot" Single released January 2008

The Myriad "Prelude to Arrows" released October 2007 (also credited as mixer)

The Myriad "Perfect" a Smashing Pumpkins Tribute released July 2007

Ian Mcintosh "Awakened" released July 2007

Wesley Jensen "Pirates and Cowboys" released July 2007 (also credited as mixer)

Ardent "Sounds" released June 2007 (mixer/engineer)

Transition "Get There" released April 2006

Constancy "The Apathy Tree" released March 2006 (also credited as mixer)

The Myriad "You Can't Trust A Ladder" released June 2005 (engineer only)

Maktub "Say What You Mean" released April 2005 (asst engineer)

The Myriad "Self Titled" released June 2004 (also credited as mixer)

Deborah Brown "Heather In The Midst" released May 2004 (editing, mastering)
