= Love Has a Name (Jesus Culture album) =

Live album by Jesus Culture
- Released: August 11, 2017
- Recorded: 2017
- Venue: Jesus Culture Church, Sacramento, California, U.S.
- Genre: Worship; contemporary Christian music
- Length: 80:54
- Label: Jesus Culture Music; Sparrow; Capitol CMG
- Producer: Jeremy Edwardson

Jesus Culture chronology
Let It Echo (2016)	Love Has a Name (2017)	Living With a Fire (2018)

Singles from Love Has a Name
- 1. "Love Has a Name (featuring Kim Walker-Smith)" Released: October 6, 2017

Love Has a Name is the tenth live album and twelfth album overall by American worship group Jesus Culture. The album was released on August 11, 2017 by the group's imprint label, Jesus Culture Music alongside Capitol Christian Music Group and Sparrow Records. Jeremy Edwardson produced the album.

== Background ==
In May 2017, The Christian Beat published an interview with Jesus Culture worship leader Chris Quilala at Pittsburgh, Pennsylvania during the Outcry Spring 2017 Tour, where he revealed that Jesus Culture would release the second album to be recorded live at the Jesus Culture Church in Sacramento, California in late July or early August. Quilala shared that about nineteen songs had been recorded and the tracklisting was being trimmed, and also disclosed that a live version of "Fresh Outpouring", a song on Kim Walker-Smith's album On My Side (2017), would be on the album. Quilala was also asked if the album has a specific message from a conceptual standpoint, to which he responded saying:

All of the worship leaders in Jesus Culture don’t always get to write together. But it’s funny to see the themes that do come out. A couple lyrics for several songs – one of them being "Flood The Earth" that Katie Torwalt does, and that lyric 'flood the earth' was also in one of Kim’s songs and I said it on one of my songs in a spontaneous moment. So the fresh outpouring of the spirit of God’s presence flooding the earth is a common theme. There is a thread that definitely goes through the whole album. Also, I wrote a song with friends called “Make Us One” that is about the church coming together and setting aside our fences, which is a needed message at this point in time.

— Chris Quilala, The Christian Beat

In a press release published on June 30, 2017, Jesus Culture and Capitol CMG announced the release of Love Has a Name to be slated for August 11, 2017 and that the digital preorder for the album was available. Kim Walker-Smith says that the album is "a collection of songs that we wrote with our church in mind, thinking of all the people walking through the different seasons with us."

== Promotion ==
At the commencement of the digital preorder period in June 2017, "Halls of Heaven" which featured the vocals of Chris Quilala was made available for instant download, being the first preorder single from the album. "Love Has a Name", which featured Kim Walker-Smith, was released in July 2017 as the second preorder single from the album. "Flood the Earth" featuring Katie Torwalt was the third song to be availed for instant download, followed by "Make Us One" featuring Chris Quilala being released in August 2017 as the fourth and final preorder single from the album.

== Singles ==
The studio version of "Love Has a Name", featuring Kim Walker-Smith was released on October 6, 2017 as the lead single from the album.

== Commercial performance ==
The week ending September 2, 2017 saw the sale of 10,000 equivalent album units of Love Has a Name, thus topping the Billboard Christian Albums chart in the same week. Love Has a Name is Jesus Culture's second album to attain the top position on the chart after their 2014 live LP, Unstoppable Love.

== Critical reception ==
Professional ratings
Review scores
Source	Rating
CCM Magazine	4/5 stars
The Christian Beat	4.4/5 stars
Cross Rhythms	10/10 squares
Hallels	4/5 stars
Jay's Musik Blog	4.5/5
Louder Than The Music	4/5 stars
Today's Christian Entertainment	3.5/5 stars

CCM Magazine's Matt Conner rated the album four stars out of five, saying that it is filled with "stirring anthems and ballads," and describes the live arrangement as "exciting and inspiring." Bestowing the album a four-point-four star rating in a review at The Christian Beat, Emily Caroline states that "In Love Has a Name, the listener gets fresh takes on Jesus Culture’s signature sound and new opportunities to enter into a worshipful attitude and express love, thanks and praise to God." Giving the album a perfect ten squares in a Cross Rhythms review, Tony Cummings praised the group for having "maintained such a high creative standard, never allowing the pressure to deliver a new set of songs to weaken their resolve to present the Church with music which has a prophetic edge and a real sense of God speaking to those who love him." Cummings concluded "they [Jesus Culture] have found a wonderful way of engaging our emotions and leading us into the throne room." In a superbly positive review by Aaron Lewendon for Eden.co.uk, says "All in all, Love Has a Name is pure escapism in worship." Luchae Williams in a favourable review for Gateway News drew the conclusion that "In Love Has a Name, Jesus Culture followers will appreciate an album that stays true to the collective”s format — vocally impressive power ballads and catchy pop-infused praise. Worship teams will appreciate the bulk of the album, which holds a definite congregational sound." Hallels music critic Timothy Yap awarded Love Has a Name a four star rating in his review, pointing out that the album's deluxe version is particularly long, then concluding that "for those who take the time to listen, the power in these 16 songs are right on transforming." Jay Wright of Jay's Musik Blog says in his four and a half star review that "the presence of God is undeniably captured in a beautiful way in this latest Jesus Culture CD," and confesses that he "got lost in the beauty and the presence of God contained in it." Jono Davies, indicating in a four star review at Louder Than The Music, states, "This is an album that looks at the amazing love of God in what can seem like a hard world to live in. An album that wants you to focus on God throughout everything." Kelly Meade, reviewing the album for Today's Christian Entertainment whilst rating it three and a half stars, says, "Love Has a Name captures the live worship experience with its stadium-ready, electric guitar driven tracks as the vocalists lead the congregation in prayerfully meditative and repetitive choruses. There’s no denying the talent of these artists as they perform and the words being sung are done so with reverent passion."

=== Accolades ===
On August 8, 2018, the Gospel Music Association announced the nominees of the 49th Dove Awards, with Love Has a Name in the running for the Worship Album of the Year award. On October 16, 2018, Love Has a Name lost the Worship Album of the Year award to Reckless Love by Cory Asbury at the 49th Annual GMA Dove Awards ceremony held at Lipscomb University's Allen Arena in Nashville, Tennessee.

== Track listing ==
Standard edition
No.	Title	Writer(s)	Length
1.	"Halls of Heaven" (featuring Chris Quilala)	Chris Quilala; Ricky Jackson; Ran Jackson; Joshua Silverberg	5:06
2.	"Let Our Faith Become a Mountain" (featuring Kim Walker-Smith)	Kim Walker-Smith; Lindsey Sweat; Hank Bentley	4:46
3.	"Weight of Heaven" (featuring Chris Quilala)	Quilala; Silverberg; Judah Akers; Mia Fieldes; Ian McIntosh	4:23
4.	"Love Has a Name" (featuring Kim Walker-Smith)	Walker-Smith; Ricky Jackson; Ran Jackson	9:59
5.	"Flood the Earth" (featuring Katie Torwalt)	Fieldes; Seth Mosley; Silverberg; Bryan Torwalt; Katie Torwalt	5:54
6.	"Make Us One" (featuring Chris Quilala)	Quilala; Ran Jackson; Ricky Jackson; Silverberg	6:22
7.	"Sound of Adoration" (featuring Bryan Torwalt)	B. Torwalt; K. Torwalt; Phil Wickham	4:13
8.	"Never Stop" (featuring Kim Walker-Smith)	Walker-Smith; Sweat; Jacob Sooter	6:07
9.	"Fresh Outpouring" (featuring Kim Walker-Smith)	Walker-Smith; Bryan Fowler; Mark Alan Schoolmeesters	13:59
10.	"Love Overcomes" (featuring Derek Johnson)	Derek Johnson; Jeffrey Kunde; Sooter	4:45
11.	"My One My All" (featuring Chris McClarney)	Chris McClarney; Jeff Pardo	6:02
12.	"However You Want" (featuring Chris Quilala)	Quilala; Silverberg	9:18
Total length:			80:54

Deluxe edition
No.	Title	Writer(s)	Length
13.	"Infinite" (featuring Kim Walker-Smith)	Jordan Frye; David Andrew	5:49
14.	"Love That Saves" (featuring Ruthie Ridley)	McClarney; Fowler; Matt Armstrong	5:05
15.	"Make a Way" (featuring Jon Egan)	Jon Egan; Jason Ingram	5:56
16.	"Anything Can Happen" (featuring Chris Quilala)	Quilala; Bentley; Sweat; Nick Herbert	6:07
Total length:			103:51

== Charts ==
=== Album ===
Chart (2017)	Peak position
Belgian Albums (Ultratop Flanders)	154
Swiss Albums (Schweizer Hitparade)	46
UK Christian & Gospel Albums (OCC)	1
US Billboard 200	51
US Christian Albums (Billboard)	1
US Digital Albums (Billboard)	6

=== Singles ===
Year	Single	Peak positions	
Year	Single	US Christian	Christian Airplay
2017	"Love Has a Name" (featuring Kim Walker-Smith)	38	42

== Release history ==
Region	Date	Version	Format	Label	Ref.
Worldwide	August 11, 2017	Standard	CD; digital download; streaming	Jesus Culture Music; Capitol Christian Music Group; Sparrow Records	
Worldwide	August 11, 2017	Deluxe	CD; digital download; streaming	Jesus Culture Music; Capitol Christian Music Group; Sparrow Records	
