= Living With a Fire =

Live album by Jesus Culture
- Released: August 31, 2018
- Recorded: Encounter Conference 2018
- Venues: Jesus Culture Church, Sacramento, California, U.S.
- Genres: Contemporary worship; CCM
- Length: 100:10
- Labels: Jesus Culture Music; Sparrow; Capitol CMG
- Producer: Jeremy Edwardson

Jesus Culture chronology
Love Has a Name (2017)	Living With a Fire (2018)

Singles from Living With a Fire
- 1. "Freedom" Released: January 18, 2019

Living With a Fire is the eleventh live album and thirteenth album overall by American worship group Jesus Culture. The album was released on August 31, 2018 by the group's imprint label, Jesus Culture Music alongside Capitol Christian Music Group and Sparrow Records.

Living With a Fire was nominated for the 2019 Grammy Award for Best Contemporary Christian Music Album.

== Background ==
On July 13, 2018, Jesus Culture and Capitol Christian Music Group announced the then-forthcoming release of Living With a Fire, slated for August 31 release, with the commencement of the album's digital pre-order. The album, recorded live at Jesus Culture Church in Sacramento during their conference, features Kim Walker-Smith, Chris Quilala, Bryan & Katie Torwalt, Derek Johnson and Chris McClarney as worship leaders. The album is a celebration of Jesus Culture as a movement of people passionate about worshipping God approaching twenty years, with Kim Walker-Smith sharing that "we can say with conviction that our hearts are still burning for Jesus, and we are still wanting to bring Him glory, above all."

== Release and promotion ==
At the commencement of the digital pre-order period in July 2018, "Living With a Fire" which featured the vocals of Chris Quilala and Kim Walker-Smith-led tracks "Freedom" and "Center of Your Love" were availed for instant download, being the first three pre-order singles from the album. On July 25, 2018, Jesus Culture published the live music video of the song "Defender" led by Katie Torwalt, on YouTube. "Not Afraid" featuring Kim Walker-Smith, was released on August 4, 2018, as the fourth pre-order single from the album. On August 15, 2018, "Move" featuring Chris McClarney became the fifth pre-order single availed from the album, followed by "Anointing" featuring Chris Quilala being released on August 22, 2018, as the sixth and final pre-order single from the album. The complete album was released on August 31, 2018.

== Singles ==
Jesus Culture released a radio-adapted version of "Freedom" featuring Kim Walker-Smith as the lead single of the album on January 18, 2019.

== Tour ==
On July 13, 2018, Jesus Culture announced Living With a Fire Tour, slated for October 2018. The tour's promotion and production being handled by Premier Productions, the featured Jesus Culture members Kim Walker-Smith, Chris Quilala, Bryan & Katie Torwalt and Chris McClarney together with Jesus Culture founder Banning Liebscher and Pastor Nathan Edwardson will be stopping in twenty cities across the United States for nights of worship.

== Critical reception ==
Professional ratings
Review scores
Source	Rating
CCM Magazine	4/5 stars
Hallels	3/5 stars
Jesus Freak Hideout	2/5 stars

Living With a Fire prompted mixed reactions, with varied sentiments echoed in reviews about the collection from critics within the CCM and contemporary worship music genres.

Mark Geil of CCM Magazine rated the album four stars out of five, describing the sound as "bright and modern," bemoaning the track length saying "some of them simply run too long," and concluded that the album is a "strong offering from Jesus Culture, with quality songs of declaration and dependence." In a three star review of the collection at Hallels, Timothy Yap states that "there is not a lack of future church worship songs" on the album, but criticised it for failing to "charter new ground," concluding that the release, though good, can be "a tad run-of-the-mill bland too." Giving the album a poor two star rating in a Jesus Freak Hideout review, David Craft, who described the album as "yet another mediocre project," and reasoned that it satisfies the listening habits of Jesus Culture fans but advised those in need of new worship songs that "there are far better alternatives to consider."

NewReleaseToday music critic Mark Ryan, excitedly indicated in his review that "Live worship alums should be the only worship albums that are allowed to be released, and Jesus Culture does not disappoint on Living With a Fire. The gang from Sacramento, CA continues to deliver powerful worship that crosses generations and is meant for the whole church." Gerod Bass, in his review of the album at Worship Musician Magazine, says that Living With a Fire "is pretty much what we've come to expect from Jesus Culture as far as songs and arrangements go." Bass resolved that fans will "love this big collection of new songs. There is nothing ground-breaking here, and it seems as if Jesus Culture has kind of adopted the saying "If it ain't broke, don't fix it.""

=== Accolades ===
Year	Organization	Award	Result	Ref.
2019	We Love Christian Music Awards	The Chorus Award (Church Worship Album of the Year)	Nominated	
2019	Grammy Awards	Best Contemporary Christian Music Album	Nominated	

== Commercial performance ==
In the United States, Living With a Fire debuted at No. 1 on Billboard's Christian Albums chart dated September 15, 2018, having earned sales of 6,000 equivalent album units in its first week. Living With a Fire is Jesus Culture's third album to attain the top position on the chart after Unstoppable Love (2014) and Love Has a Name (2017). The album was also listed as the eighth best-selling digital release in the country that same week, with a placement on the mainstream Billboard 200 chart at No. 134.

== Track listing ==
Living With a Fire
No.	Title	Writer(s)	Length
1.	"Move" (featuring Chris McClarney)	Jeff Pardo; Chris McClarney; Lindsey Sweat	6:50
2.	"Awe" (featuring Chris Quilala)	Chris Quilala; Jordan Frye	5:43
3.	"Not Afraid" (featuring Kim Walker-Smith)	Mia Fieldes; Travis Ryan; Adeze Noelle Azubuike; David Anderson	7:25
4.	"Living With a Fire" (featuring Chris Quilala)	Chris Quilala; Chase Wagner; Bobby Walker	6:15
5.	"Defender" (featuring Katie Torwalt)	John-Paul Gentile; Steffany Gretzinger; Rita Springer	12:18
6.	"Center of Your Love" (featuring Kim Walker-Smith)	Hanna Sheets	9:35
7.	"Freedom" (featuring Kim Walker-Smith)	Hank Bentley; Kristian Stanfill; Brett Younker; Fieldes; Frye	6:31
8.	"Anointing" (featuring Chris Quilala)	Fieldes; Jacob Sooter; Quilala	8:12
9.	"Be Crowned" (featuring Bryan Torwalt)	Mia Fieldes; Jacob Sooter; Bryan Torwalt; Katie Torwalt	5:26
10.	"Yes and Amen" (featuring Chris McClarney)	Nate Moore; McClarney; Tony Brown	5:47
11.	"Beautiful Day" (featuring Derek Johnson)	Jeffrey Kunde; Derek Johnson; Bentley; Frye	4:21
12.	"Let Love" (featuring Chris McClarney & Kim Walker-Smith)	Ran Jackson; Ricky Jackson, Matt Meares; Lauren Meares	5:35
13.	"How Amazing" (featuring Kim Walker-Smith)	Hillary McBride; Jason Ingram; Walker-Smith; Sweat	10:06
14.	"For No Other Reason" (featuring Chris Quilala)	Fieldes; Quilala; Andrew Holt; Tommy Sjostrom	6:06
Total length:			110:10

== Personnel ==
Adapted from AllMusic.

Singers

- Derek Johnson – vocals
- Chris McClarney – vocals
- Chris Quilala – vocals
- Bryan Torwalt – vocals
- Katie Torwalt – vocals
- Kim Walker-Smith – vocals

Musicians

- Jeremy Edwardson – keyboards, programming
- Andrew Jackson – keyboards, programming
- Jeffrey Kunde – keyboards, programming, guitars
- Ian McIntosh – keyboards, programming
- Brandon Aaronson – bass
- Josh Fisher – drums

== Production ==
- Banning Liebscher – executive producer
- Jeremy Edwardson – producer, engineer, mixing
- Jeffrey Kunde – additional production
- Ian McIntosh – additional production
- Andrew Jackson – engineer
- Jamie Beaudoin – assistant engineer
- Drew Lavyne – mastering
- Christopher York – A&R
- Matt Jones – design, packaging

== Charts ==
Chart (2018)	Peak position
UK Christian & Gospel Albums (OCC)	9
US Billboard 200	134
US Top Christian Albums (Billboard)	1

== Release history ==
Region	Date	Format	Label	Ref.
Various	August 31, 2018	CD; digital download; streaming	Jesus Culture Music; Capitol Christian Music Group; Sparrow	
