= Everything and Nothing Less =

Live album by Chris McClarney
- Released: June 9, 2015
- Recorded: January 23–24, 2015
- Venue: 2015 Jesus Culture Sacramento Conference
- Genre: Worship
- Length: 48:31
- Label: Sparrow, Jesus Culture
- Producer: Jeremy Edwardson

Chris McClarney chronology
Defender (2010)	Everything and Nothing Less (2015)	Breakthrough (2018)

Everything and Nothing Less is the first live album by Chris McClarney. Sparrow Records and Jesus Culture Music released the album on June 9, 2015. McClarney worked with Jeremy Edwardson, in the production of this album.

== Critical reception ==
Professional ratings
Review scores
Source	Rating
CCM Magazine	3.5/5 stars
Christian Music Review	3.6/5
Cross Rhythms	10/10 squares
Louder Than the Music	5/5 stars
New Release Today	4/5 stars
Worship Leader	4/5 stars

Giving the album a ten out of ten from Cross Rhythms, Stephen Luff states, "If there's been a better live worship album released in the last year or two, I've yet to hear it." Kevin Sparkman, rating the album three and a half stars at CCM Magazine, writes, "The vocals are the biggest star here—passion seems to drip off of every performed lyric, impossible to ignore McClarney's anointing in addition to a worshipful response from its listener." Indicating in a four star review at Worship Leader, Jeremy Armstrong writes, "Everything and Nothing Less is only lacking in narrative depth...The emotions are strong and the poetry is beautiful, and with a bit more focus on God and a little less on us, McClarney will doubtless bring prayers to the lips of thousands of worshipers—with Jesus getting the glory."

Awarding the album four stars from New Release Today, Christopher Thiessen states, "McClarney writes and performs these songs of praise and adoration so naturally that it will inspire many to join in and surrender all to the One who is worthy." Jono Davies, giving the album five stars for Louder Than the Music, writes, "these are songs that will last a long time". Rating the album a 3.6 out of five at Christian Music Review, Laura Chambers describes, "Everything and Nothing Less ushers us to a place of surrender in the hopes that that's exactly what we'll do when we get there."

== Track listing ==
Track listing
No.	Title	Writer(s)	Length
1.	"Holy Moment"	Chris McClarney, Jason Ingram	6:04
2.	"All Consuming Fire"	McClarney, Chris Sayburn	4:25
3.	"God of Miracles"	McClarney, Jordan Frye, Chad Bohi	5:26
4.	"Everything and Nothing Less"	McClarney, Ingram, Aaron Ivey	7:12
5.	"Beauty for Ashes"	McClarney, Brenton Brown	4:53
6.	"On Earth as It Is in Heaven" (featuring Kim Walker-Smith)	McClarney, Josh Bronleewe	5:55
7.	"Running After You (Deep Calls)"	McClarney, Stuart Garrard	4:49
8.	"Thirsty"	McClarney, Garrard, Anthony Skinner	5:37
9.	"Came to My Rescue"	Marty Sampson, Joel Davies, Dylan Thomas	4:10
Total length:			48:31

== Chart performance ==
Chart (2015)	Peak position
US Christian Albums (Billboard)	8
US Heatseekers Albums (Billboard)	8
