= Let It Echo =

Live album by Jesus Culture
- Released: January 15, 2016
- Recorded: 2015
- Venue: Jesus Culture Church in Sacramento, California
- Genre: Worship
- Length: 73:01
- Label: Sparrow / Jesus Culture
- Producer: Jeremy Edwardson

Jesus Culture chronology
Unstoppable Love (2014)	Let It Echo (2016)	Let It Echo Unplugged (2016)

Singles from Let It Echo
- 1. "Fierce (featuring Chris Quilala)" Released: January 8, 2016; 2. "In the River (featuring Kim Walker-Smith)" Released: January 8, 2016; 3. "God with Us (featuring Bryan Torwalt)" Released: February 19, 2016; 4. "Miracles (featuring Chris Quilala)" Released: August 5, 2016; 5. "Alive in You (featuring Kim Walker-Smith)" Released: October 14, 2016

Let It Echo is a live album by Jesus Culture. Sparrow Records, alongside Jesus Culture Music, released the album on January 15, 2016.

== Critical reception ==
Professional ratings
Review scores
Source	Rating
CCM Magazine	4/5 stars
The Christian Beat	5/5 stars
The Christian Manifesto	3.5/5 stars
Cross Rhythms	10/10 squares
Jesus Freak Hideout	2.5/5 stars
Jesus Wired	80/100
Louder Than the Music	5/5 stars
New Release Today	3.5/5 stars
Worship Leader	5/5 stars

The album received generally favorable reviews. Matt Conner of CCM Magazine rated the album four stars and stated, "Let It Echo is definitely the most polished set of live songs released by Jesus Culture yet." Tony Cummings of Cross Rhythms gave it a ten star rating and stated, "Some years ago prophecies were made that before the Lord's return there would be revivals of darkness and of light and that contemporary music would be a spearhead for revival. Albums like this one is bringing that day ever closer." Mark Ryan of New Release Today gave the album three and a half stars, stating that "With Let It Echo, Jesus Culture has fully completed its transition from its student ministry roots to providing the next generation of songs for the Church as a whole...They do this with thoughtful, passionate (and easy to sing!) anthems of praise and faith that go beyond hype and emotion."

On the other hand, David Craft of Jesus Freak Hideout gave the album two and a half stars, stating that "While Let it Echo is a decent enough album, not much sets it apart from this year's other worship albums, nor from Jesus Culture's prior efforts. This time, unfortunately, there doesn't seem to be any standout tracks which would profoundly add to their legacy, so this album may not be the best starting point for new listeners."

== Awards and accolades ==
On August 9, 2017, it was announced that the song "Fierce" would be nominated for a GMA Dove Award in the Worship Song of the Year category at the 48th Annual GMA Dove Awards.

== Commercial performance ==
The album debuted on Billboard 200 at No. 35, No. 2 on the Top Christian Albums chart, selling 13,000 copies in its first week. It has sold 35,000 copies in the United States as of June 2016.

== Track listing ==
Album release
No.	Title	Writer(s)	Length
1.	"Never Gonna Stop Singing" (featuring Kim Walker-Smith)	Ran Jackson; Matt Vaughan; Tom Smith	4:24
2.	"Fierce" (featuring Chris Quilala)	Chris Quilala; Joshua Silverberg; Mia Fieldes	4:06
3.	"Alive in You" (featuring Kim Walker-Smith)	Walker-Smith; Jordan Frye	5:14
4.	"In the River" (featuring Kim Walker-Smith)	Quilala; Silverberg; Ryan Williams; Mark Alan Schoolmeesters	4:37
5.	"Let It Echo (Heaven Fall)" (featuring Chris Quilala)	Quilala; Sarah Reeves; Jacob Sooter	8:11
6.	"God with Us" (featuring Bryan Torwalt)	Bryan & Katie Torwalt	6:59
7.	"Miracles" (featuring Chris Quilala)	Quilala; Silverberg; Dustin Smith; Stuart Garrard	8:38
8.	"Set Me Ablaze" (featuring Katie Torwalt)	Fieldes; Sooter; B. & K. Torwalt	6:07
9.	"Everything and Nothing Less" (featuring Chris McClarney)	Chris McClarney; Aaron Ivey; Jason Ingram	7:23
10.	"In Your Presence" (featuring Kim Walker-Smith)	Reeves; Sooter	6:37
11.	"I Stand in Awe" (featuring Chris Quilala)	Quilala; Fieldes; Hank Bentley; Matt Maher	5:17
12.	"Power in the Cross" (featuring Derek Johnson)	Derek Johnson; Gabe Kossol; Anthony Skinner	5:28
Total length:			73:01

== Charts ==
=== Album ===
==== Weekly charts ====
Chart (2016)	Peak position
Australian Albums (ARIA)	36
Canadian Albums (Billboard)	51
Dutch Albums (Album Top 100)	68
New Zealand Albums (RMNZ)	12
Swiss Albums (Schweizer Hitparade)	29
US Billboard 200	35
US Christian Albums (Billboard)	2

==== Year-end charts ====
Chart (2017)	Position
US Christian Songs (Billboard)	40

=== Singles ===
Year	Single	Peak positions			
Year	Single	US Christian	Christian Airplay	Christian Digital Songs	Christian Streaming Songs
2017	"Fierce" (featuring Chris Quilala)	14	15	16	22
2017	"In the River" (featuring Kim Walker-Smith)	27	–	–	–
2017	"Miracles" (featuring Chris Quilala)	50	–	–	–
2017	"Alive in You" (featuring Kim Walker-Smith)	39	33	–	–
