= Unstoppable Love =

Live album by Jesus Culture
- Released: June 3, 2014
- Recorded: January 2014
- Venue: Jesus Culture Encounter Conference at California's Historic Memorial Auditorium in Sacramento, California
- Genre: Worship
- Length: 87:52
- Label: Jesus Culture Music
- Producer: Jeremy Edwardson

Jesus Culture chronology
Live from New York (2012)	Unstoppable Love (2014)	Let It Echo (2016)

Unstoppable Love is a live album from Jesus Culture. Jesus Culture Music released the album on June 3, 2014.

== Critical reception ==
Professional ratings
Review scores
Source	Rating
AllMusic	3/5 stars
CCM Magazine	4/5 stars
Cross Rhythms	9/10 squares
Jesus Freak Hideout	3.5/5 stars
Jesus Wired	8.5/10 stars
Louder Than the Music	4.5/5 stars
New Release Today	4.5/5 stars

Awarding the album four stars at CCM Magazine, Grace Aspinwall states, "Unstoppable Love is filled with passionate, soaring vocals". David Jeffries, rating the album three stars for AllMusic, writes, "it's the Jesus Culture album to grab when nothing but the most stately songs are what's required." Giving the album four and a half stars from New Release Today, Kevin Davis describes being, "impressed by the consistent quality and fresh worshipful songs that come from Jesus Culture." Stephen Luff, indicating in a nine out of ten review by Cross Rhythms, says, "The album delivers a set of worship songs of the highest quality and leaders Chris Quilala and Kim Walker-Smith have clearly lost none of their prophetic power." Signaling in a three and a half star review at Jesus Freak Hideout, Matthew Morris replies, "Jesus Culture's tenth album is one of their best." Jono Davies, specifying in a four and a half star review from Louder Than the Music, declares, "Jesus Culture have put together a stunning collection of songs of worship to the King of Kings whose love never stops." Assigning the album an eight and a half star review for Jesus Wired, Jessica Morris recognizes, "Unstoppable Love is a bold and riveting release by Jesus Culture."

== Awards and accolades ==
This album was No. 15 on the Worship Leader's Top 20 Albums of 2014 list.

The song, "Unstoppable Love", was No. 15 on the Worship Leader's Top 20 Songs of 2014 list.

This album was No. 11, on the Worship Leader's Top 20 Albums of 2015 list.

== Track listing ==
No.	Title	Writer(s)	Length
1.	"Sing Out" (featuring Chris Quilala)	Jeremy Edwardson, Jeffrey Kunde, Ian McIntosh, Chris Quilala	6:27
2.	"We Will Run" (featuring Kim Walker-Smith)	Kari Jobe, McIntosh, Quilala	4:06
3.	"Light of the World" (featuring Chris Quilala)	McIntosh, Quilala	3:46
4.	"Surrender All (Give You Everything)" (featuring Chris Quilala)	Jess Cates, Anthony Skinner	7:25
5.	"Unstoppable Love" (featuring Kim Walker-Smith)	Christa Black Gifford, Skyler Smith, Kim Walker-Smith	9:13
6.	"Your Name Is Glorious" (featuring Kim Walker-Smith)	Cates, Skinner	8:29
7.	"No Other Like You (We Will Exalt You)" (featuring Chris Quilala)	Edwardson, Derek Johnson, Kunde, McIntosh, Quilala Bryan Torwalt, Katie Torwalt	8:44
8.	"You Made a Way" (featuring Chris Quilala)	Matt Gilman	5:32
9.	"We Stand" (featuring Chris Quilala)	Edwardson, Kunde, McIntosh, Quilala	5:32
10.	"Wide Open" (featuring Kim Walker-Smith [DVD and digital only])	Cates, Quilala, Skinner	6:21
11.	"Born of God" (featuring Chris Quilala [DVD and digital only])	Justin Jarvis	5:34
12.	"In Awe of You" (featuring Kim Walker-Smith)	Cates, Skinner	9:15
13.	"10,000 Reasons" (featuring Kim Walker-Smith)	Jonas Myrin, Matt Redman	7:28
Total length:			87:52

== Chart performance ==
Chart (2014)	Peak position
US Billboard 200	25
US Christian Albums (Billboard)	1
US Independent Albums (Billboard)	2
