= Kingdom Come (Bryan & Katie Torwalt album) =

Studio album by Bryan & Katie Torwalt
- Released: October 15, 2013
- Genre: CCM, Christian rock, Christian alternative rock, worship
- Length: 46:36
- Label: Jesus Culture, Kingsway
- Producer: Jeremy Edwardson

Bryan & Katie Torwalt chronology
Here On Earth (2011)	Kingdom Come (2013)	Bryan & Katie Torwalt (2015)

Kingdom Come is the second studio album by Bryan & Katie Torwalt. Jesus Culture Music alongside Kingsway Music released the album on October 15, 2013. They worked with Jeremy Edwardson in the production of this album.

== Critical reception ==
Professional ratings
Review scores
Source	Rating
Cross Rhythms	8/10 squares
Louder Than the Music	5/5 stars

Writing a review for AllMusic, James Christopher Monger describes, "[Kingdom Come as an] evocative CCM folk-pop that pairs tight, gorgeous harmonies with engaging melodies... [that] doesn't disappoint". Lins Honeyman, giving the album an eight out of ten at Cross Rhythms, says, "[Kingdom Come] showcase not only the Torwalts' obvious songwriting skills and the innovative production skills of Jeremy Edwardson but also the wonderfully unique and mesmerizingly passionate vocal style of Katie which shimmers and shines throughout this release." Awarding the album five stars from Louder Than the Music, Jono Davies states, "this album was a more intimate sounding album compared to some Jesus Culture recordings."

== Track listing ==
No.	Title	Writer(s)	Length
1.	"He Is the Light"	Bryan Torwalt	4:15
2.	"King of All the Earth"	B. Torwalt	3:59
3.	"Weight of Glory"	B. Torwalt	4:23
4.	"When You Walk Into the Room"	B. Torwalt, Katie Torwalt	4:45
5.	"Shores"	B. Torwalt	3:20
6.	"Spirit of the Living God"	B. Torwalt	4:15
7.	"I Will Trust You"	B. Torwalt	4:51
8.	"Worthy King"	B. Torwalt	4:23
9.	"Let Every Heart"	B. Torwalt	4:16
10.	"It Was Finished"	B. Torwalt, K. Torwalt	4:44
11.	"Burn"	B. Torwalt	3:25
Total length:			46:36

== Personnel ==
- Bryan Torwalt – lead vocals, backing vocals
- Katie Torwalt – lead vocals, backing vocals
- Ian McIntosh – keyboards
- Jonathan Berlin – keyboards, acoustic guitars, electric guitars
- Jeffrey Kunde – acoustic piano, acoustic guitars, electric guitars
- Tore Kulleseid – electric guitars
- Brandon Aaronson – bass
- Josh Fisher – drums
- Lewis Patzner – cello
- Anton Patzner – viola, violin, string arrangements
- Janna Adams – backing vocals
- Paul Arend – backing vocals
- Jenna Bachman – backing vocals
- Crystal Bjorkman – backing vocals
- Jonathan Bjorkman – backing vocals
- Hannah McClure – backing vocals
- Paul McClure – backing vocals
- Hilary Moriarty – backing vocals
- Skyler Smith – backing vocals
- Kim Walker-Smith – backing vocals, lead vocals
- Cody Williams – backing vocals
- Shannon Williams – backing vocals

== Production ==
- Banning Liebscher – executive producer
- Jeremy Edwardson – producer, engineer
- Jonathan Berlin – additional production
- Jeremy SH Griffith – mixing
- Drew Lavyne – mastering
- Skyler Smith – photography
- Skylauki Productions – design

== Charts ==
Chart (2013)	Peak position
US Billboard 200	43
US Christian Albums (Billboard)	3
US Independent Albums (Billboard)	5
