= Real Love (Derek Johnson album) =

Studio album by Derek Johnson
- Released: April 7, 2015
- Genre: CCM, Christian rock, Christian alternative rock, worship
- Length: 54:01
- Label: Jesus Culture, Sparrow
- Producer: Jeremy Edwardson

Real Love is the debut studio album by American Christian musician Derek Johnson. Jesus Culture Music alongside Sparrow Records released the album on April 7, 2015. Jeremy Edwardson produced the album.

== Critical reception ==
Professional ratings
Review scores
Source	Rating
CCM Magazine	3.5/5 stars
Christian Review Magazine	4/5 stars
Cross Rhythms	9/10 squares
Louder Than the Music	4/5 stars
New Release Tuesday	4/5 stars
Worship Leader	4.5/5 stars

Awarding the album three and a half stars for CCM Magazine, Grace S. Aspinwall says, "A bit more innovation would have been nice, but his performances are passionate and moving." Marcus Hathcock, rating the album four stars at New Release Tuesday, writes, "Real Love is a solid offering by a fantastic vocalist and worshipper in Johnson." Indicating in a four and a half star review by Worship Leader, Jay Akins states, "Derek has given the Church a wonderful new body of Jesus-and-gospel-centered worship music...Strong vocals, great music, and powerful life-changing truth make this record a must for the modern Church."

Giving the album four stars by Jono Davies from Louder Than the Music, describes, "this is all about one thing, and that is songs that take the listener closer to God and thankfully Derek Johnson captures that brilliantly." Writing a review for Christian Review Magazine, Leah St. John rating the album four stars, says, "Real Love is a well produced release that the presents honest and worshipful lyrics, passionate vocals, and great musicianship." Rating the album a nine out of ten for Cross Rhythms, Tony Cummings writes, "Derek has demonstrated he has a lot more excellent material."

== Track listing ==
All tracks are written by Derek Johnson except where noted.

No.	Title	Writer(s)	Length
1.	"Our Salvation"		3:48
2.	"The One We Love"		4:31
3.	"Jesus, I See You"		3:39
4.	"Power in the Cross"	Derek Johnson, Gabe Kossol, Anthony Skinner	4:31
5.	"I Belong to You"		3:54
6.	"Real Love"		4:20
7.	"Bright as You"		4:20
8.	"My Great Love"	Johnson, Bryan Torwalt, Aaron Wardle	3:50
9.	"Heaven Meeting Earth"		5:23
10.	"Made to Last"		5:22
11.	"Washed Away"	Johnson, Kossol	4:40
12.	"Glory Come Down"		5:43
Total length:			54:01

== Personnel ==
Adapted from AllMusic.

- Brandon Aaronson — bass
- Jonathan Berlin — mastering
- Jeremy Edwardson — engineer, keyboards, producer
- Andrew Ehrenzeller — background vocals
- Mary Kat Ehrenzeller — background vocals
- Josh Fisher — drums
- Jeremy S.H. Griffith — mixing
- Joanna Hampton — background vocals
- Andrew Jackson — engineer, keyboards, production assistant
- Derek Johnson — acoustic guitar, primary artist, vocals
- Gabe Kossol — background vocals
- Tore Kulleseid — guitar, keyboard, production assistant
- Jeffrey Kunde — guitar
- Banning Liebscher — executive producer
- Ian McIntosh — keyboards
- Kim Walker-Smith — executive producer

== Charts ==
Chart (2015)	Peak position
US Christian Albums (Billboard)	17
US Heatseekers Albums (Billboard)	9
