= Atmospheres (album) =

Live album by Justin Jarvis
- Released: September 30, 2014
- Venues: Oklahoma City, OK; Dallas, TX; Houston, TX; Albuquerque, NM; El Paso, TX
- Genres: CCM, Christian rock, Christian alternative rock, worship
- Length: 62:46
- Label: Jesus Culture
- Producer: Jeremy Edwardson

Atmospheres is the debut live album by Justin Jarvis. Jesus Culture Music released the album on September 30, 2014. Jarvis worked with Jeremy Edwardson in the production of this album.

== Critical reception ==
Professional ratings
Review scores
Source	Rating
Cross Rhythms	7/10 squares
Louder Than the Music	3/5 stars
New Release Tuesday	4/5 stars

Giving the album a seven out of ten review from Cross Rhythms, Joy Farrington writes, "Jarvis clearly sings from a place of passionate love and intimacy which overcomes the slightly repetitive musical backdrop." Mary Nikkel, awarding the album four star for New Release Tuesday, states, "This is a collection of beautiful, heartfelt moments with Jesus." In rating the album three stars at Louder Than the Music, Wesley Huntley says, "This album, is not a typical worship album, and Justin isn’t a typical worship leader."

== Track listing ==
All tracks are written by Justin Jarvis.

No.	Title	Length
1.	"Take Heart" (Live in Oklahoma City, OK)	4:41
2.	"Taste" (Live in Oklahoma City, OK)	6:23
3.	"Atmospheres" (Live in Dallas, TX)	6:28
4.	"Be My Love" (Live in Houston, TX)	6:02
5.	"Heaven's Light" (Live in Houston, TX)	7:11
6.	"Here We Are" (Live in Albuquerque, NM)	6:24
7.	"Rivers (Turn the Tide)" (Live in Houston, TX)	7:04
8.	"In the Middle" (Live in Houston, TX)	6:15
9.	"Have Your Way (Spontaneous)" (Live in Houston, TX)	4:36
10.	"Born of God" (Live in El Paso, TX)	7:42
Total length:		62:46

== Personnel ==
- Justin Jarvis – vocals, guitars, acoustic guitar, songwriter
- Jeffrey Kunde – guitars, acoustic guitar
- Tore Kulleseid – guitars, programming
- Ian McIntosh – keyboards
- Josh Fisher – drums
- Jeremy Edwardson – programming, engineer, producer
- Andrew Jackson – programming, engineer
- Patrick Everett – engineer
- Jeremy Griffith/Jeremy S.H. Griffith – audio mixer
- Darren Lau – photographer
- Kim Walker-Smith – executive producer

== Charts ==
Chart (2014)	Peak position
US Heatseekers Albums (Billboard)	46
