= Throne Room (song) =

Single by Kim Walker-Smith

from the album On My Side
- Released: March 10, 2017
- Genre: Worship
- Length: 4:44
- Label: Jesus Culture
- Songwriter(s): Kim Walker-Smith; Jacob Sooter; Lindsay Sweat; Mia Fieldes

Kim Walker-Smith singles chronology
"Alive in You" (2016)	"Throne Room" (2017)	"Love Has a Name" (2017)

Music video
- "Throne Room" on YouTube

"Throne Room" is a song by American worship leader, singer, and songwriter Kim Walker-Smith. It was released on March 10, 2017, as the lead single from her third studio album, On My Side (2017). The song was written by Walker-Smith, Jacob Sooter, Lindsay Sweat, and Mia Fieldes. It appeared on the album WOW Hits 2018: Deluxe Edition.

== Background ==
In an interview with Hannah Goodwyn of CBN, Walker-Smith stated:

"This song is all about getting into the presence of God. We all have Jesus inside of us, but there's something about the posture of our hearts and our willingness to really lay down all the distractions and the concerns and stress and everything else and shift our perspective and mindset to be on him and to lift our eyes to Him. No matter what's going on, what I'm facing, there is one place—it's Him and His presence—where I can get peace, where I can get answers, where I can get everything I need. It's also the place where we should be visiting and checking in on a regular basis. A relationship with God includes consistency and quality time and complete access to Him and His presence anytime of day at any moment no matter where I am. All I have to do is shift my perspective and put my attention on Him."

== Critical reception ==
Timothy Yap of Hallels said the song "is what gives Jesus Culture its patented sound. Bold, anthemic and with their signature epic build-up, 'Throne Room' puts to worship the promise of Hebrews 4:16." Jesus Freak Hideout's Mason Haynie claimed "Walker-Smith takes a well-known idea in 'Throne Room' and makes it all the more reverential by pondering the heaviness of God's name." Kevin Ekmark of Church stated "[Throne Room] is almost haunting with what sounds like angels singing in the background. The strong percussion and build to the chorus help it stand out as the first powerful worship song on the album." Louder Than the Music's Jay Wright proclaimed "we are reminded that in God's holy presence we get captivated 'with angels and saints and all I can say is holy, holy, holy are You God!' With its powerful lyrics, the track has a heavier sound to it, building strongly by the chorus. Kim's vocals match the building music perfectly!"

== Music videos ==
The official music video for the song was released on March 16, 2017 and has garnered over 1.3 million views as of November 2017.

== Charts ==
Chart (2017)	Peak position
US Christian Songs (Billboard)	17

== Release history ==
Region	Date	Format	Label	Ref.
Worldwide	March 10, 2017	Digital download	Jesus Culture	
