= Live from New York (Jesus Culture album) =

Live album by Jesus Culture with Martin Smith
- Released: November 20, 2012
- Recorded: June 28–30, 2012
- Venue: Jesus Culture Conference at Nassau Veterans Memorial Coliseum in Long Island
- Genre: Contemporary, alternative rock, worship
- Length: 111:45
- Label: Columbia, Integrity
- Producer: Jeremy Edwardson

Jesus Culture chronology
Emerging Voices (2012)	Live from New York (2012)	Unstoppable Love (2014)

Martin Smith chronology
Live from New York (2012)	God's Great Dance Floor Movement One (2012)

Live from New York is a live album by Jesus Culture with Martin Smith. The album was released on November 20, 2012 by Columbia Records and Integrity Media, and produced by Jeremy Edwardson.

== Background ==
Jesus Culture was joined by former Delirious? lead vocalist Martin Smith, and recorded the album live at the Jesus Culture Conference in June 2012.

== Critical reception ==
Professional ratings
Review scores
Source	Rating
AllMusic	4/5 stars
CCM Magazine	4/5 stars
The Christian Manifesto	5/5 stars
Christian Music Zine	4.75/5 stars
Cross Rhythms	10/10 stars
Indie Vision Music	4/5 stars
Louder Than the Music	5/5 stars
New Release Tuesday	4/5 stars
Worship Leader	4.5/5 stars

Live from New York has garnered "universal acclaim" by the nine review of the album.

AllMusic's David Jeffries called the album a "unique effort". At CCM Magazine, Grace S. Aspinwall proclaimed that "the result is spectacular" with respect to the teaming up of Jesus Culture and Martin Smith on the album, and wrote that "Smith bolsters an already stellar team to greatness." The Christian Manifesto's Calvin E'Jon Moore told that the release has "very few flaws." Joshua Andre of Christian Music Zine evoked how "the 110 minute journey is truly magical and God-breathed!" In addition, Andre found that "Martin is such a great songwriter and brings a certain type of energy to these ballads and upbeat tracks too", which the whole effort was "Well done everyone involved." Cross Rhythms Tony Cummings signaled that "occasionally, recording a live worship album completely blurs the distinction between deft musical expertise and audience participation atmosphere, between Holy Spirit-blown improvisation and thoughtful theological songwriting, between popular art and timeless anointing. This is one of those occasions."

Jonathan Andre of Indie Vision Music surmised that "Martin is still giving us anthems and melodies that are certain to be classics for years to come", which he vowed that the album is "a worshipful experience like no other", and stated that "Live From New York gives a great worshipful experience to any listener". Louder Than the Music's Dave Wood affirmed that "Worship music has never sounded better", and he found that with respect to "the guitar playing on this album is nothing short of world class, with remarkable riffs that float and soar in the background, while passion soaked vocals from Martin and the Jesus Culture team articulate their worship." Furthermore, Wood called this a "simply stunning" album. Mary Burklin of New Release Tuesday said this "is an experience, an album inviting the listener into the room with the band and the audience as they have a corporate conversation with God". and she goes onto proclaim that "the experience is well-crafted through a masterful mix of crowd vocals, the gifted worship leaders, and moments of reflection."

However, Burklin was critical in noting that "although it does not bring much fresh material to the table musically, this is an album worth listening to for those seeking the passionate pursuit of God and a deeper connection to His people in the community that is the Church." At Worship Leader, Jeremy Armstrong highlighted that the album "is unique in the Jesus Culture oeuvre because Martin Smith is so present—in a good way", and said the band "once again captured the voice of a generation engaging with God in their native tongue where passion, power, intensity, and intimacy converge in a musical rhapsodic prayer."

== Commercial performance ==
Upon its debut, the album charted as selling the seventh most amongst Christian albums by Billboard, and the No. 123 most-sold albums in the United States.

== Track listing ==
Disc 1
No.	Title	Writer(s)	Worship Leader/Performer	Length
1.	"Fire Never Sleeps"	Nick Herbert, Martin Smith	Smith	6:01
2.	"Forevermore"	Chris Quilala	Quilala	6:03
3.	"Pursuit"	Daniel Bashta	Smith, Kim Walker-Smith	7:19
4.	"Walk with Me"	Stu Garrard, Jason Ingram, Paul Mabry, Jon Thatcher	Walker-Smith	8:31
5.	"Waiting Here for You"	Jesse Reeves, Smith, Chris Tomlin	Smith, Walker-Smith	7:14
6.	"Our God Reigns"	Smith	Smith	5:25
7.	"Song of Solomon"	Smith	Smith	7:51
8.	"Set a Fire"	Will Reagan	Quilala	5:15
9.	"Alleluia"	Quilala, Ian McIntosh, Jeffrey Kunde, Jeremy Riddle	Quilala	8:04

Disc 2
No.	Title	Writer(s)	Worship Leader/Performer	Length
1.	"I Am in Love with You"	Darrell Evans	Quilala	4:47
2.	"Oh How I Love You"	Quilala	Quilala	6:41
3.	"Holy Spirit" (feat. Smith, Walker-Smith)	Bryan Torwalt, Katie Torwalt	Jesus Culture	8:09
4.	"God Is Coming"	Tim Hughes, Smith	Walker-Smith	7:25
5.	"Show Me Your Glory/Majesty"	Kathy Frizzell, Garrard, Nate Ward II, Smith, Walker-Smith	Walker-Smith	7:20
6.	"Did You Feel the Mountains Tremble?"	Smith	Quilala, Smith	8:49
7.	"I Belong to You"	Jeremy Edwardson, Derek Johnson	Johnson	6:51
Total length:				111:45

== Charts ==
Chart (2012)	Peak position
US Billboard 200	123
US Top Christian Albums (Billboard)	7
