= Live at the Knight =

Live album by John Mark McMillan
- Released: October 31, 2015
- Genre: Worship, alternative rock, Southern rock
- Length: 77:50
- Label: Jesus Culture, Sparrow

John Mark McMillan chronology
You Are the Avalanche (2015)	Live at the Knight (2015)	Mercury & Lightning (2017)

Live at the Knight is the first live album by the American musician John Mark McMillan. Jesus Culture Music and Sparrow Records released the album on October 23, 2015.

== Critical reception ==
Professional ratings
Review scores
Source	Rating
The Christian Manifesto	5/5 stars
Cross Rhythms	10/10 squares
Jesus Freak Hideout	4.5/5 stars
New Release Today	4/5 stars

Awarding the album four and a half stars at Jesus Freak Hideout, Scott Fryberger stated: "Live at the Knight is John Mark McMillan's first ever live album, and he, his band, and the sound crew all nailed it." Cal Moore at The Christian Manifesto gave the album five stars and wrote that "Live at The Knight certainly fits in the 'best of' category." Rating the album four stars for New Release Today, Mary Nikkel said: "If a lot of contemporary worship has begun to feel dry and sterile, this rowdy, passionate set of live songs might be exactly the refreshment you need." In a ten out of ten review by Cross Rhythms, Stephen Curry said, "this whole live experience is masterfully executed from one of the Church's finest artists."

== Track listing ==
No.	Title	Length
1.	"Counting On, Pt. 1"	1:30
2.	"Guns / Napoleon"	5:36
3.	"Borderland"	7:04
4.	"Love at the End"	5:16
5.	"Death in His Grave" (featuring Bryan Torwalt)	5:16
6.	"Love You Swore"	7:29
7.	"King of My Heart" (featuring Sarah McMillan)	6:34
8.	"Glorious Things" (featuring Sarah McMillan)	7:18
9.	"Holy Ghost"	2:37
10.	"Future / Past" (featuring Kim Walker-Smith)	9:47
11.	"Carbon Ribs"	4:34
12.	"Heart Runs" (featuring Katie Torwalt)	7:27
13.	"Counting On"	2:45
14.	"How He Loves" (featuring Kim Walker-Smith)	4:46
Total length:		77:50

== Chart performance ==
Chart (2015)	Peak position
US Christian Albums (Billboard)	14
US Top Rock Albums (Billboard)	45
