= Deep Magic =

Studio album by John Mark McMillan
- Released: October 6, 2023
- Genre: Christian alternative rock
- Length: 47:04
- Label: Lionhawk

John Mark McMillan chronology
Peopled with Dreams (2020)	Deep Magic (2023)	Cosmic Supreme (2025)

Deep Magic (stylized "DEEP MAGIC") is the eighth studio album by American Christian singer and songwriter John Mark McMillan, released on October 6, 2023, through Lionhawk Records. All songs from Deep Magic were released as singles between 2021 and 2023, aside from the titular track.

== Background ==
Deep Magic comprises twelve previously released singles and the titular track "Deep Magic." McMillan announced the album release date, October 6, 2023, via social media on September 7, 2023.

== Promotion ==
McMillan announced the Tall Tales Tour on June 20, 2023. The tour made eleven stops within the United States, with seven being acoustic shows, and four as full-band dates.

== Track listing ==
All tracks are written by John Mark McMillan.

Standard edition
No.	Title	Length
1.	"Has It Been You" (feat. Sarah McMillan)	3:20
2.	"Roaring Thunder"	3:17
3.	"Deep Magic"	3:51
4.	"Love With A Crown"	3:15
5.	"Deliver Me"	3:50
6.	"New Day in the Dark"	3:56
7.	"Awake in the Dream"	3:26
8.	"Re-Enchanted World"	3:47
9.	"Ordinary Love"	3:27
10.	"Atlanta"	3:24
11.	"Prove My Love"	3:58
12.	"Re-Enchanted World (Sessions)" (feat. Owl City)	3:33
13.	"Hammering Heart (Sessions)" (feat. Sleeping at Last)	3:52
Total length:		47:04
