= Economy (album) =

Studio album by John Mark McMillan
- Released: November 1, 2011
- Genre: Contemporary worship music, contemporary Christian music, Christian rock
- Length: 44:44
- Label: Integrity
- Producer: McMillan, Jeremy Griffith, Joel Khouri

John Mark McMillan chronology
The Medicine (2010)	Economy (2011)	Borderland (2014)

Economy is the second studio album by Christian singer-songwriter John Mark McMillan, released on November 1, 2011 by Integrity Music. The album was produced by McMillan, Jeremy Griffith and Joel Khouri.

== Critical reception ==
Professional ratings
Review scores
Source	Rating
The Blue Indian	9.5/10 stars
CCM Magazine	4/5 stars
Christian Music Zine	4.5/5 stars
Christianity Today	4/5 stars
Indie Vision Music	4/5 stars
Jesus Freak Hideout	4.5/5 stars
Louder Than the Music	4.5/5 stars
PopMatters	6/10 stars

Economy garnered critical acclaim from nine music critics. At CCM Magazine, Matt Conner rated the album four stars, saying that McMillan "has found a Springsteen-like groove that resonates deeply with its honest questions and vulnerable organic approach", which "is beautiful from front to back." Philip Majorins of PopMatters rated the album six out of ten, writing that the songs are structured in a way that makes them "mostly compelling and certainly emotional" and the release "contains hopeful strains that do not go out of their way to gloss over the human condition." At Christianity Today, Robert Ham rated the album four stars, indicating that this "is a rare work" because it can be played anywhere, as the release features a "strong, turbulent collection that rambles with the same mid '70s rock-influenced drive of artists like Wilco and Bright Eyes."

At Jesus Freak Hideout, Roger Gelwicks rated the album four-and-a-half stars, affirming that "Economy has stepped things up in every corner" because the album "is a great investment in profound and awe-inspiring worship, and it’s unhesitatingly one of the best albums of the year as a result." Scott Fryberger of Jesus Freak Hideout rated the album four-and-a-half stars, stating that "McMillan once again proves to be one of the best artists that Integrity has to offer, with a sound that is very solid and refreshing", and that listeners should "Give Economy a listen, [and] admire the fact that there are still worshippers who make good music, and praise God along with the other satisfied listeners." At Indie Vision Music, Jessica Cooper rated the album four stars, calling the album "phenomenal" for its "same dynamic and hard-hitting elements of McMillan's writing carry over to create a sense of familiarity, but in a fresh way", and the lyrics "conveys a heavy, impermeable weight of hope".

At Louder Than the Music, Jono Davies rated the album four-and-a-half stars, underscoring that "It isn't a clean cut worship album, and that's fine with me and anyone else who wants gripping, creative, inventive, original, fresh, new, inspired, experimental, honest, heartfelt, spine tingling moments of worship." David Huey of Christian Music Zine rated the album four-and-a-half stars, highlighting how "Economy is an emotional, authentic rock album that can easily be placed in the worship genre." At The Blue Indian, Holly Etchison rated the album nine-and-a-half out of ten, proclaiming the album to be "Jubilant. Unfettered. Triumphant. Catastrophic. Resplendent." In addition, Etchison notes that "His Economy subtly and skillfully asks the real question facing the poverty stricken, the prosperous: it is not what don’t we have, but what do we have?"

== Commercial performance ==
For the Billboard charting week of November 19, 2011, Economy was the No. 95 most sold album in the entirety of the United States via the Billboard 200 and it was the No. 6 most sold album in the Christian category by the Christian Albums charting. Also, the album was the No. 23 most sold album on the Top Rock Albums chart, and it was the No. 16 most sold on the Independent Albums chart.

== Track listing ==
All tracks are written by John Mark McMillan.

No.	Title	Length
1.	"Sheet of Night"	3:30
2.	"Daylight"	3:07
3.	"Heart Bleeds"	4:18
4.	"Love You Swore"	4:01
5.	"Murdered Son"	3:57
6.	"Economy"	4:36
7.	"Who Is This"	5:48
8.	"Sins Are Stones"	5:32
9.	"Chemicals"	3:38
10.	"Seen a Darkness"	6:17
Total length:		44:44

== Charts ==
Chart (2011)	Peak position
US Billboard 200	95
US Christian Albums (Billboard)	6
US Independent Albums (Billboard)	16
US Top Rock Albums (Billboard)	23
