= Borderland (John Mark McMillan album) =

Studio album by John Mark McMillan
- Released: March 4, 2014
- Genres: Contemporary worship music, contemporary Christian music, Christian rock
- Length: 55:00
- Label: Lionhawk (independent)

John Mark McMillan chronology
Economy (2011)	Borderland (2014)	You Are the Avalanche (2015)

Borderland is the fourth album by Christian singer and songwriter John Mark McMillan, and it released on March 4, 2014, by Lionhawk Records, which is his own newly established label. The album charted at No. 41 on the Billboard 200, and it got positive reviews from HM, three from Jesus Freak Hideout, New Release Tuesday and Worship Leader, which it got one mixed review from CCM Magazine.

== Release and promotion ==
McMillan's fourth album was successfully crowdfunded through Kickstarter.

The album was released to stream on The Drop by Relevant, which was done as a pre-release only special.

== Critical reception ==
Professional ratings
Review scores
Source	Rating
The Blue Indian	10/10 stars
CCM Magazine	3/5 stars
Christian Music Zine	5/5 stars
HM	4.5/5 stars
Indie Vision Music	5/5 stars
Jesus Freak Hideout	4/5 stars 4.5/5 stars
Louder Than the Music	5/5 stars
New Release Tuesday	4.5/5 stars
The Phantom Tollbooth	4.5/5 stars
Worship Leader	4.5/5 stars

Borderland garnered critical acclaim from eleven music critics ratings and reviews. At New Release Tuesday, Mary Nikkel rated the album four-and-a-half stars out of five, saying that release is "not to be missed" because it contains "an exquisite blend of indie and church music sensibilities, vibing with folk trends one moment and reverent choral traditions the next without ever feeling like it leans too heavily on convention." Holly Etchison of The Blue Indian rated the album ten out of ten stars, writing that "Borderland is a rare definition, honed and heard by a musician on the cusp, surveying it before and with us and handing it back." At Worship Leader, Andrea Hunter rated the album four-and-a-half stars out of five, stating that " In the tradition of classics like Orbison, Dylan, and Cash, McMillan arrests and captivates with timeless artistry." Rob Houston of HM rated the album four-and-a-half stars out of five, writing that "Borderland is his best work to date." At Indie Vision Music, Josh Hamm rated the album a perfect five stars, stating that McMillian "has taken his music to another level" on the release that is "Richly resonant and powerfully vibrant", which is "the perfect blend of style and substance." Eric Landfried rated the album four-and-a-half tocks, writing that McMillan did not adhere to "the same, well-worn groove" on this release because he is one of those rare "musicians that can create music that stirs the heart and write lyrics that can feed the soul."

At Jesus Freak Hideout, Roger Gelwicks rated the album four stars out of five, stating that the release is "not a completely smooth listen"; however it "keeps his name in the conversation as an immensely talented singer/songwriter that this industry still truly needs." In addition, Gelwicks calls the album "a solid next step." Mark Rice rated the album four-and-a-half stars out of five, saying that McMillian "offers up some of his most dynamic work." Mark Geil of Jesus Freak Hideout rated the album four stars out of five, stating that the release "marks a zenith" for McMillian, and says "This is an outstanding album, with moments for corporate worship, personal contemplation, and comfort in the borderland." At Louder Than the Music, Jono Davies rated the album a perfect five stars, and according to him the release is a "brilliant piece of musical art" on which each song "paints a different shade of colour in this wonderful picture" that gives "Each colour on its own is lovely, but together they make a wonderful masterpiece." Christian Music Zine's Anthony Peronto rated the album five stars, writing that the release "is a great work of art." At CCM Magazine, Andy Argyrakis rated the album three stars out of five, which is the only mixed review of the release, calling it "An intriguing compilation of songs, Borderland simmers with sincerity" yet says "There are hints of Coldplay musicality in spots; and the only downfall is the musical styling is a bit narrow, leaving the door wide open for future musical experimentation and growth."

== Awards and accolades ==
The album was No. 2 on the Worship Leader's Top 5 Community Funded and Indie Releases of 2014 list.

The song, "Future/Past", was No. 9 on the Worship Leader's Top 20 Songs of 2014 list.

== Commercial performance ==
For the Billboard charting week of March 22, 2014, Borderland was the No. 41 most sold album in the entirety of the United States via the Billboard 200 and it was the No. 3 most sold album in the Christian Albums market. In addition, it was the No. 7 most sold album in the Independent Albums market, and it was the No. 23 most Digital Albums. The album has sold 21,000 copies in the United States as of September 2015.

== Track listing ==
No.	Title	Length
1.	"Holy Ghost"	3:46
2.	"Love at the End"	4:41
3.	"Guns / Napoleon"	5:32
4.	"Future / Past"	6:41
5.	"Borderland"	4:49
6.	"Counting On"	5:32
7.	"Monsters Talk"	3:50
8.	"Tongues of Fire"	4:33
9.	"Silver Shore"	4:23
10.	"Heart Runs"	6:46
11.	"Visceral"	4:27
Total length:		55:00

== Chart performance ==
Chart (2014)	Peak position
US Billboard 200	41
US Top Christian Albums (Billboard)	3
US Digital Albums (Billboard)	23
US Independent Albums (Billboard)	7
