= Peopled with Dreams =

Studio album by John Mark McMillan
- Released: February 14, 2020
- Studios: Hawk's Den Studio, North Carolina
- Genre: Christian alternative rock
- Length: 38:30
- Label: Lionhawk
- Producers: Jacob Early; John Mark McMillan

John Mark McMillan chronology
Smile in the Mystery (2018)	Peopled with Dreams (2020)	Deep Magic (2023)

Peopled with Dreams is the seventh studio album by American Christian singer and songwriter John Mark McMillan, released on February 14, 2020, through Lionhawk Records. The album includes singles "The Road, the Rocks, and the Weeds", "Bright Abyss", "Juggernaut", and "Pilgrim".

Professional ratings
Review scores
Source	Rating
Jesus Freak Hideout	4.5/5 stars
The Phantom Tollbooth	4/5 stars

== Background and recording ==
Peopled with Dreams was produced by Jacob Early and John Mark McMillan and recorded at Hawk's Den Studio in Charlotte, NC. The album was mixed by Chad Howat and mastered by Jonathan Berlin.

== Promotion ==
While McMillan typically would have toured the album soon after its release, he was unable to embark on the Awake in the Dream Tour until late 2021 due to the COVID-19 pandemic. The tour stopped at various locations across the United States, and McMillan was joined on tour by Strahan, The Gray Havens, and Antoine Bradford.

== Commercial performance and critical reception ==
Peopled with Dreams peaked at No. 47 on Billboard'}s Top Christian Albums chart, but did not chart outside the Christian genre like his previous release. The album was received well by reviewing critics, though it received little critical attention.

== Track listing ==
All tracks are written by John Mark McMillan.

Standard edition
No.	Title	Length
1.	"Christ Jesus"	2:25
2.	"Juggernaut"	3:54
3.	"Cousin John"	2:46
4.	"Bright Abyss"	2:56
5.	"Pilgrim"	3:57
6.	"Everything New"	3:15
7.	"Hammering Heart"	4:34
8.	"The Road, The Rocks and the Weeds"	3:36
9.	"God Is Young"	4:00
10.	"Unbroken Horses"	3:25
11.	"Ancient and Brave" (featuring Sarah McMillan)	3:41
Total length:		38:30
