= The Medicine (John Mark McMillan album) =

Studio album by John Mark McMillan
- Released: July 6, 2010
- Genre: Contemporary worship music, contemporary Christian music, Christian rock
- Length: 69:45
- Label: Integrity
- Producer: McMillan

John Mark McMillan chronology
The Song Inside: The Sounds of Breaking Down (2005)	The Medicine (2010)	Economy (2011)

The Medicine is the debut studio album by Christian singer-songwriter John Mark McMillan, released on July 6, 2010, by Integrity Music. McMillan is the producer on the album.

== Critical reception ==
Professional ratings
Review scores
Source	Rating
The Blue Indian	9.3/10
CCM Magazine	4/5 stars
Christianity Today	3/5 stars
Cross Rhythms	9/10 squares
Jesus Freak Hideout	4.5/5 stars 4/5 stars

The Medicine garnered acclaim from several music critics. At CCM Magazine, Andrew Greer rated the album four stars, writing that it is "full of heartbreaking hooks, provocative melodies and poetic verses." Peter Timmis of Cross Rhythms rated the album nine out of ten squares, stating, "The album's Americana vibe may come as a surprise to those who only know of JMM through his worship hit ["How He Loves"] but sceptics will soon be won over by the big choruses, gritty vocals and gripping lyrics on offer here." At Christianity Today, John Brandon rated the album three stars out of five: "Pounding drums, soaring guitar solos, and a classic-rock vocal delivery make this an eclectic, but appealing, listen."

At Jesus Freak Hideout, Garrett DeRossett rated the album four and a half stars, affirming that "All in all, a listen through The Medicine is highly worth your money, time, and thought [...] in fact, you may leave the experience with more of the latter than you began." Roger Gelwicks of Jesus Freak Hideout rated the album four stars, noting, "All things considered, however, The Medicine is artistic, reverent, and accomplished, and is more than a significant step in the right direction both for McMillan and the modern worship scene as a whole." At The Blue Indian, Holly Etchison rated the album a 9.3 out of ten, proclaiming that the release "serves as a vibrant message to a weary people", and calling it "essential music for a time of nonessentials."

== Commercial performance ==
For the Billboard charting week of July 24, 2010, The Medicine ranked No. 185 on the Billboard 200 (out of all albums sold in the United States) and No. 8 on Billboard's chart of Top Christian Albums.

== Track listing ==
All tracks are written by John Mark McMillan.

No.	Title	Length
1.	"Reckoning Day"	4:07
2.	"The Medicine"	3:34
3.	"Skeleton Bones"	7:09
4.	"Carbon Ribs"	4:11
5.	"Dress Us Up"	8:43
6.	"Death In His Grave"	5:54
7.	"Belly of the Lion"	3:45
8.	"Philadelphia"	4:27
9.	"Out of the Ground"	4:17
10.	"Ten Thousand"	4:49
11.	"Carolina Tide"	3:42
12.	"My Only"	5:25
13.	"Between the Cracks"	4:56
14.	"How He Loves (single)"	4:46
Total length:		69:45

== Charts ==
Chart (2010)	Peak position
US Billboard 200	185
US Christian Albums (Billboard)	8
