= When Christmas Comes (album) =

Studio album by Kim Walker-Smith
- Released: November 4, 2014
- Genre: Worship, contemporary Christian music
- Length: 54:33
- Label: Jesus Culture
- Producer: Jeremy Edwardson

Kim Walker-Smith studio album chronology
Home (2013)	When Christmas Comes (2014)	On My Side (2017)

Singles from Kim Walker-Smith
- 1. "Carols of the Bells" Released: November 4, 2014

When Christmas Comes is a Christmas album from Kim Walker-Smith. Jesus Culture Music released the album on November 4, 2014. She worked with Jeremy Edwardson, in the production of this album.

== Critical reception ==
Professional ratings
Review scores
Source	Rating
365 Days of Inspiring Media	4/5 stars
AllMusic	3.5/5 stars
CCM Magazine	3.5/5 stars
Cross Rhythms	8/10 squares
Jesus Freak Hideout	3.5/5 stars
Louder Than the Music	4/5 stars
New Release Today	4/5 stars

Awarding the album three and a half stars for AllMusic, Andy Kellman writes, "The sequence of songs smoothly glides along, ideal for small Christmastime gatherings." Tony Cummings, rating the album an eight out of ten from Cross Rhythms, says, "when you have truly exceptional vocal skills you can sing almost anything (even songs about shiny nosed reindeers) and make it enjoyable." Mark Ryan, giving the album four stars at New Release Today, states, "Kim Walker-Smith treats the classic carols and traditional songs with care, adding just the right amount of her own flavor to the songs to make them quite worshipful." Allocating three and a half stars to the album from CCM Magazine, Matt Conner says, "When Christmas Comes, keep[s] it traditional with a straightforward set of Christmas classics."

Signaling in a three and a half star review by Jesus Freak Hideout, Ryan Barbee describes, "The album is, overall, a very good compilation or sacred and traditional, but some may find that Walker-Smith's vocals don't tend to match the sound of the music." Jono Davies, indicating in a four star review from Louder Than the Music, responds, " if you are a fan of Kim's voice, you will indeed love this album, and so you should." Assigning the album four stars at 365 Days of Inspiring Media, Joshua Andre replies, "When Christmas Comes is jam packed with plenty of surprises...As we can see during the Christ centred lyrics, Kim’s album is a must buy this holiday season, what are you waiting for? 17 tracks… there doesn’t need to be any more convincing, I reckon!"

== Track listing ==
No.	Title	Length
1.	"Tell Me the Story of Jesus"	1:40
2.	"Silent Night"	5:18
3.	"Angels We Have Heard On High"	3:25
4.	"It's Beginning To Look a Lot Like Christmas"	2:06
5.	"I'll Be Home For Christmas"	3:13
6.	"The First Noel"	3:26
7.	"Away In A Manger"	3:14
8.	"Have Yourself A Merry Little Christmas"	3:24
9.	"Let It Snow"	2:20
10.	"O Come O Come Emmanuel"	3:47
11.	"O Come All Ye Faithful"	4:18
12.	"O Holy Night"	5:55
13.	"Carol Of The Bells"	2:37
14.	"Winter Wonderland"	1:40
15.	"Rudolph The Red Nose Reindeer"	2:55
16.	"White Christmas"	3:13
17.	"The Christmas Song"	2:02
Total length:		54:33

== Chart performance ==
Chart (2014)	Peak position
US Billboard 200	95
US Christian Albums (Billboard)	7
US Independent Albums (Billboard)	13
