= You Are the Avalanche =

EP by John Mark & Sarah McMillan
- Released: June 23, 2015
- Genre: Worship, alternative rock, Southern rock
- Length: 24:02
- Label: Lionhawk

John Mark & Sarah McMillan chronology
Borderland (2014)	You Are the Avalanche (2015)	Live at the Knight (2015)

You Are the Avalanche is the first extended play from John Mark & Sarah McMillan. Lionhawk Records released the EP on June 23, 2015.

== Critical reception ==
Professional ratings
Review scores
Source	Rating
CCM Magazine	4/5 stars
Jesus Freak Hideout	4/5 stars
Worship Leader	4.5/5 stars

Awarding the EP four stars at CCM Magazine, Matt Conner states, "Consider this EP as a beautiful bookend." Bobby Gillies, giving the EP four and a half stars for Worship Leader, writes, "the McMillan's are eager to explore in their skilled biblically-informed poetry." Rating the EP four stars from Jesus Freak Hideout, Mark Rice says, "With five excellent potential additions to a Sunday morning lineup, all of which are very well-done and better in quality than most worship music".

== Accolades ==
The song, "Heart Won't Stop", was No. 9 on the Worship Leader's Top 20 Songs of 2015 list.

== Track listing ==
No.	Title	Length
1.	"The Goodness"	5:13
2.	"Walk Around My House"	5:00
3.	"King of My Heart"	4:55
4.	"Heart Won't Stop"	4:12
5.	"Glorious Things"	4:42
Total length:		24:02

== Chart performance ==
Chart (2015)	Peak position
US Top Christian Albums (Billboard)	3
