= Mercury & Lightning =

Studio album by John Mark McMillan
- Released: September 1, 2017
- Studio: Feng Way Studio, Washington; Bright City Studios, North Carolina
- Genre: Christian rock; Alternative rock
- Length: 55:23
- Label: Lionhawk
- Producer: Gabriel Wilson

John Mark McMillan chronology
| Live at the Knight (2015) | Mercury & Lightning (2017) | The Mercury Sessions (2018) |

Mercury & Lightning is the sixth studio album by American Christian singer and songwriter John Mark McMillan, released on September 1, 2017, through Lionhawk Records. The album includes singles "Wilderlove", "No Country", and "Enemy, love."

== Background and recording ==
Mercury & Lightning was produced by Gabriel Wilson and recorded at Feng Way Studio in Vancouver, WA and Bright City Studios in Charlotte, NC. The album was engineered by Aaron Knott, mixed by Chad Howat, and mastered by Jonathan Berlin.

== Promotion ==
McMillan embarked on the "Mercury & Lightning Tour 2017" with Kings Kaleidoscope and LaPeer, performing at a variety of locations across the United States.

== Commercial performance and critical reception ==
Professional ratings
Review scores
| Source | Rating |
|---|---|
| Jesus Freak Hideout | 5/5 stars |

Mercury & Lightning peaked at No. 1 on the Billboard Top Christian Albums chart, and also charted outside of the Christian music realm, reaching No. 44 on the Top Rock Albums chart and No. 39 on the Top Album Sales chart. The album was received well by reviewing critics, though it received little critical attention.

== Track listing ==
All tracks are written by John Mark McMillan, except where noted

Standard edition
| No. | Title | Writer(s) | Length |
|---|---|---|---|
| 1. | "Mercury & Lightning" | | 3:12 |
| 2. | "Wilderlove" | | 4:41 |
| 3. | "Gods of American Success" | | 3:32 |
| 4. | "Enemy, love." | | 4:18 |
| 5. | "Unhaunted" | | 3:45 |
| 6. | "Persephone" | | 3:10 |
| 7. | "Death In Reverse" | | 4:01 |
| 8. | "e s r e v e r n i h t a e d" | | 3:04 |
| 9. | "Raging Moon" | | 3:23 |
| 10. | "Body In Motion" (featuring Liz Vice) | | 3:41 |
| 11. | "No Country" | McMillan, Gabriel Wilson, Eric Hurtgen | 4:19 |
| 12. | "Magic Mirror" | | 4:31 |
| 13. | "Fumbling Towards the Light" | | 4:49 |
| 14. | "Nothing Stands Between Us" | McMillan, Gabriel Wilson | 4:56 |
| Total length: | | | 55:23 |
