= Before All Things =

Studio album by Eleven22 Worship
- Released: September 4, 2015
- Genre: Worship, CCM
- Length: 49:28

Eleven22 Worship chronology
The Reason (2012)	Before All Things (2015)

Before All Things is the third studio album by Eleven22 Worship. They released the album on September 4, 2015.

== Critical reception ==
Professional ratings
Review scores
Source	Rating
CCM Magazine	3.5/5 stars
Cross Rhythms	9/10 squares
New Release Today	3.5/5 stars
Worship Leader	4/5 stars

Awarding the album three and a half stars at CCM Magazine, Jamie Walker describes, "Musically, the album weaves a subtle path between worship genre favorites, the more memorable moments following the throwback trend of 80s-influenced synth pop." Darryl Bryant, giving the album four stars from Worship Leader, writes, "Eleven22 are at their best and balanced with duets but Before All Things delivers worship beyond the Church." Rating the album three and a half stars for New Release Today, Marcus Hathcock states, "The Church of Eleven22 certainly deserves some more attention and credibility as a worship movement from Before All Things. The production value, vocal prowess and, most of all, lyrical depth set it apart in a crowded and growing crop of church-based worship albums." Andrew Wallace, indicating in a nine out of ten review by Cross Rhythms, says, "A varied, mature, multi-textured album with many layers and nuances to be uncovered; on-par with better-known brands such as Jesus Culture and Hillsong United."

== Track listing ==
No.	Title	Length
1.	"I'm Not Alone"	4:55
2.	"In You"	4:52
3.	"God Above"	4:59
4.	"Kingdom Come"	4:19
5.	"Ready for You"	4:06
6.	"Locked up Death"	4:44
7.	"Beautiful Jesus"	4:15
8.	"Before All Things"	5:40
9.	"Where the Spirit of the Lord Is"	6:09
10.	"What Grace Did for Me"	5:29
Total length:		49:28
