= Cosmic Supreme =

Studio album by John Mark McMillan
- Released: April 4, 2025
- Recorded: 2024–2025
- Studios: Echo Mountain Recording (Asheville, NC); Aevum Studio (East Tennessee); Bright Abyss / Old House Studio (Charlotte, NC)
- Genres: Worship, Christian alternative rock
- Length: 55:25
- Label: Anotherland
- Producer: Gabriel Wilson

John Mark McMillan chronology
Deep Magic (2023)	Cosmic Supreme (2025)

Cosmic Supreme is the ninth studio album by American singer-songwriter John Mark McMillan, produced by Gabriel Wilson and released on April 4, 2025. The album marked his return to worship music after more than eight years. It received generally positive reviews from Christian publications and became McMillan's most successful release on streaming.

== Background and composition ==
McMillan, known for the popular Christian worship song How He Loves, told Relevant that he had "slowly veered away" from writing worship music after struggling to reconcile his internal questions with his public role. When his father-in-law was diagnosed with cancer during the COVID-19 pandemic, McMillan stopped touring to help his wife care for him and to be his family's "professional 'being-there' person." During that time he began singing praise choruses to himself at home, new and old, and these became the basis for the album.

The album was recorded live by McMillan's band at Echo Mountain Studios in Asheville, North Carolina over one week. Wilson and McMillan then edited and reworked the recordings, with additional recording taking place at Aevum Studio in East Tennessee, and Bright Abyss/Old House Studio in Charlotte, North Carolina. Wilson called the album "a return to wonder, and to worship."

The title references John Coltrane’s album A Love Supreme, which Coltrane dedicated to God. McMillan explained it to mean that Jesus holds together the cosmos.

== Release and promotion ==
The album was released worldwide on April 4, 2025, via McMillan's imprint Anotherland. Louder Than The Music described it as McMillan's first overtly worship-focused project in over eight years.

Ahead of the release, McMillan issued "Ancient Love", "All My Life", and "Heart's Delight" as singles. The album's visual presentation draws from 1990s church aesthetics, which McMillan attributes to "just owning the cringe."

=== Tour ===
McMillan supported the album release with the 2025 Cosmic Supreme Tour, a double-bill with the band Citizens. In September 2025, he announced that it would be his final tour.

== Critical reception ==
Cosmic Supreme received generally positive reviews from Christian publications. Josh Balogh of Jesus Freak Hideout gave it four out of five stars, praising the "intimate and expansive" choruses and unusually sincere songwriting. He commended the album's production quality but felt that its 55-minute runtime dragged in the second half. SALT Magazine's Holly Morton commended the album's "striking," personal lyricism. Relevant's Emily Brown praised the album for its sincerity, concluding that it sounded "a little awkward, a little outdated, but weirdly beautiful."

Christianity Today described the album as inspirational without being sentimental, praising "All My Life" as "raw and anthemic" without becoming glossy or saccharine. The magazine also reported that Cosmic Supreme was McMillan's most successful release on streaming to date.

== Track listing ==
All tracks are written by John Mark McMillan.

Standard edition
No.	Title	Length
1.	"Ancient Love"	5:12
2.	"All My Life"	5:19
3.	"Beauty of the Lord"	6:14
4.	"Heart's Delight" (featuring Sarah McMillan)	5:23
5.	"And It Rages"	5:26
6.	"Born from Love" (featuring Sarah McMillan)	5:07
7.	"Anyone Else"	6:02
8.	"Back to the Garden"	6:24
9.	"Holy Powers"	4:55
10.	"Easy Burden"	5:23
Total length:		55:25

The Cosmic Supreme: SUPREME edition includes live, acoustic, and instrumental versions of several tracks.

== Personnel ==
Credits adapted from Gabriel Wilson's website.

=== Musicians ===
- John Mark McMillan – lead vocals, guitars
- Sarah McMillan – vocals
- James Duke – electric guitars
- Al Sergel – drums and percussion
- Jeremy Radio – bass, fretless bass
- Leonardo Solis – keyboards, "space sounds"
- Jesse Proctor – keyboards, piano, turtle shells, percussion, drums
- Antonio Marin – strings
- Allison Marin – strings
- Everett Hardin – strings, horns
- Caroline Hardin – strings, horns
- Molly Skaggs – piano
- Paul Brainard – pedal steel
- Jude McMillan – saxophone, guitar
- Williams Family Singers and friends – gang vocals
- Gabriel Wilson – additional keyboards, guitars, drums

=== Additional Musicians ===
- Jake Stevens – live guitars
- Dom Geralds – percussion
- David Vallier – backing vocals
- Stephen Williams – acoustic guitar, backing vocals
- Sam Ganbold – keyboards

=== Technical ===
- Gabriel Wilson – production
- Aaron Knott – engineering
- Jacob Early – additional editing, overdubs
- Chris Greely – mixing
- Drew Layne – mastering (digital)
- Joe Creppel – mastering (Dolby Atmos)
- Jonathan Berlin – mastering (vinyl)
- Eric Hurtchin – art and design

== Release history ==
Region	Date	Label	Format
Worldwide	April 4, 2025	Anotherland	Digital, streaming
