= Emerging Voices =

Live album by Jesus Culture
- Released: July 31, 2012
- Genre: CCM, Christian rock, Christian alternative rock, worship
- Length: 67:19
- Label: Jesus Culture
- Producer: Jeremy Edwardson, Banning Liebscher

Jesus Culture chronology
Awakening (2011)	Emerging Voices (2012)	Live from New York (2012)

Emerging Voices is a live album by Jesus Culture, featuring Mary Kat Ehrenzeller, Justin Jarvis, Derek Johnson, and Nate Ward. Jesus Culture Music released the album on July 31, 2012. They worked with Jeremy Edwardson and Banning Liebscher in the production of this album.

== Critical reception ==
Professional ratings
Review scores
Source	Rating
AllMusic	3.5/5 stars
Louder Than the Music	5/5 stars
New Release Tuesday	4/5 stars

In a review for AllMusic, David Jeffries rated the album three and a half stars, saying, "Emerging Voices an easy recommendation." Marcus Hathcock's four-star review from New Release Tuesday states, "There are a lot of powerful moments on this collection of Emerging Voices." Giving the album five stars at Louder Than the Music, Jono Davies writes, "this album is the perfect showcase album."

== Track listing ==
No.	Title	Writer(s)	Featured performer(s)	Length
1.	"Here We Are"	Justin Jarvis	Justin Jarvis	5:41
2.	"I Belong to You"	Jeremy Edwardson, Derek Johnson	Derek Johnson	6:45
3.	"Mighty Fortress"	Andrew Phillip Ehrenzeller, Mary Kat Ehrenzeller	Mary Kat Ehrenzeller	5:07
4.	"Let It Go"	Edwardson, Johnson	Derek Johnson	5:08
5.	"Be My Love"	Jarvis	Justin Jarvis	7:45
6.	"We Just Love You (Be My Love Reprise)"	Jarvis	Justin Jarvis	3:36
7.	"Who Can Compare"	A.P. Ehrenzeller, Jarvis	Mary Kat Ehrenzeller	7:55
8.	"You Are My God"	Edwardson, Johnson	Derek Johnson	8:23
9.	"Where You Are"	Shelly Head, Eric Skaggs, Nate Ward II	Nate Ward	5:07
10.	"Glory Come Down"	Johnson	Derek Johnson	5:52
11.	"I Won't Settle"	Judy Fitzpatrick, Kathy Frizzell, Ward II	Nate Ward	6:00
Total length:				67:19

== Charts ==
Chart (2012)	Peak position
US Billboard 200	132
US Christian Albums (Billboard)	3
