= On My Side =

Studio album by Kim Walker-Smith
- Released: April 21, 2017
- Recorded: 2016
- Genres: Contemporary Christian music, worship
- Length: 49:07
- Labels: Jesus Culture, Sparrow
- Producer: Jeremy Edwardson

Kim Walker-Smith chronology
| When Christmas Comes (2014) | On My Side (2017) |

Singles from On My Side
- 1. "Throne Room" Released: March 10, 2017

On My Side is the third studio album by American Christian singer Kim Walker-Smith, it is also her fifth album overall. On April 21, 2017, the album was released via labels Jesus Culture Music alongside Sparrow Records. She worked with Jeremy Edwardson in the production of the album.

== Promotion ==
On March 24, 2017, Jesus Culture Music announced the commencement of the digital pre-order of the album, having made "On My Side" and "Throne Room" available for instant download. The release of "Fresh Outpouring" as a promotional single followed on April 7, 2017. On April 14, 2017, "Glimpse" was the last song to be availed for digital download from the album.

== Singles ==
"Throne Room" was released on March 10, 2017, as the lead single from the album.

== Critical reception ==
Professional ratings
Review scores
| Source | Rating |
|---|---|
| 365 Days Of Inspiring Media | 4.5/5 stars |
| CCM Magazine | 4/5 stars |
| The Christian Beat | 4.5/5 stars |
| Cross Rhythms | 10/10 squares |
| Hallels | 3.5/5 stars |
| Jay's Musik Blog | 4.5/5 |
| Jesus Freak Hideout | 3.5/5 stars |
| Jesus Wired | 94% |
| Today's Christian Entertainment | 3.5/5 stars |

On My Side was met with positive reception having been praised by various critics of CCM and contemporary worship music genres.

Awarding the album four and a half stars from 365 Days Of Inspiring Media, Joshua Andre writes, "Well done Kim for an inspiring and thoroughly enjoyable worship project, one that has me excited for future Jesus Culture's future projects!" Bestowing the album four stars in a review at CCM Magazine, Matt Conner believes that "Each song is given the chance to swell and fade at all the right times, vertical lyrics and emotional melodies that penetrate the heart during both personal and corporate worship gatherings." Chris Major, in his review on The Christian Beat, affixing the album four and a half stars saying that "All in all, On My Side is a fantastic album. Kim's sincerity and refreshing passion shine clearly through each and every track, making each song a worthwhile listening experience." Tony Cummings, affixing a perfect ten out of ten square rating upon the album at Cross Rhythms, says, "It will surely have a profound effect on you." Indicating in a three and a half star review at Hallels, Timothy Yap states that Walker-Smith "tackles 12 new songs on this set in her signature synth-driven balladry worship." Jay Wright of Jay's Music Blog rated On My Side four-point-five-out-of-five, saying that "Every track resounds with a message of how intensely we are in need of God’s presence – how that is what we live for and were made for – and serves as a reminder to let go and surrender fully to our good God." Specifying in a three-point-five star review for Jesus Freak Hideout, Mason Haynie responds, "On My Side presents fans of worship music with well-crafted songs that could be easily sung along to in the car and at church." Signalling in a ninety four percent review by Jesus Wired, Vanessa Cohn realizes, "Overall, On My Side is a strong release. Each of the songs is tied to the central theme of being in the middle of hard or desperate times and crying out to God in them. Walker-Smith reminds us to be worshipful even in suffering because He is on our side His promises are true." Phil Stacey of Jesus Wired rated the album three-point-five stars, concluding that "If you are searching for healing, a time of spiritual renewal, or just an intimate moment of worship, On My Side will bless you tremendously."

Kevin Eckmarck of Church.org concluded that "Overall, On My Side is an overwhelming hit, as it reminds us how worship albums can and should be thoughtfully planned from beginning to end." Gateway News' Luchae Williams recommends, "Those yet to be introduced to the singer’s flavour of worship will, most likely, be hooked from the get-go."

== Commercial performance ==
In the week ending May 13, 2017, On My Side was the first album by Kim Walker-Smith to reach No. 1 on Billboard's Christian Albums chart with 9,000 equivalent album units (7,000 in traditional sales). The album also registered on Billboard's Digital Albums chart at number 10, and the all-encompassing Billboard 200 chart for the best-selling albums in the United States at No. 68.

On My Side also became Walker-Smith's maiden appearance on the Official Christian & Gospel Albums Chart in the United Kingdom, as the best-selling release for the week ending May 3, 2017.

== Track listing ==
On My Side
| No. | Title | Writer(s) | Length |
|---|---|---|---|
| 1. | "Brave Surrender" | Ben Cantelon; Nick Herbert; Lindsey Sweat; Kim Walker-Smith | 4:21 |
| 2. | "Glimpse" | Jacob Sooter; Sweat; Walker-Smith | 3:37 |
| 3. | "Throne Room" | Mia Fieldes; Sooter; Sweat; Walker-Smith | 4:44 |
| 4. | "I Know" | Jordan Frye; Skyler Smith; Walker-Smith | 4:05 |
| 5. | "Awaken Love" | Brenton Brown; Jeff Pardo; Walker-Smith | 5:09 |
| 6. | "Interlude" | Jeremy Griffith | 1:26 |
| 7. | "Just One Touch" | Frye; Smith; Walker-Smith | 4:46 |
| 8. | "On My Side" | Jess Cates; Jonathan Smith; Sweat | 4:12 |
| 9. | "You Define Me" | Joshua Silverberg; Walker-Smith | 4:06 |
| 10. | "Rise" | Sooter; Sweat; Walker-Smith | 3:50 |
| 11. | "Undone" | Paul Mabury; Sweat | 3:26 |
| 12. | "Fresh Outpouring" | Bryan Fowler; Mark Alan Schoolmeesters; Walker-Smith | 5:25 |
| Total length: | | | 49:07 |

== Personnel ==
- Kim Walker-Smith – lead vocals
- Jeremy Edwardson – keyboards, programming
- Jeremy SH Griffith – keyboards, programming
- Andrew Jackson – keyboards, programming
- Tore Kulleseid – keyboards, programming, electric guitars
- Trey Gunn – acoustic piano
- Jonathan Berlin – electric guitars, bass
- Jacob Arnold – drums, percussion
- Seth Thomas – drums, percussion
- Jeremy Larson – strings
- Joanna Hampton – backing vocals
- Lindsey Sweat – backing vocals

== Production ==
- Banning Liebscher – executive producer
- Jeremy Edwardson – producer, engineer
- Jeremy SH Griffith – additional production, mixing
- Chuck Butler – engineer
- Andrew Jackson – engineer
- Drew Lavyne – mastering
- Christopher York – A&R
- Molly Williams – art direction
- Shelly Tackett – package design
- Bliss Kaufman – photography

== Charts ==
=== Album ===
| Chart (2017) | Peak position |
|---|---|
| Australian Digital Albums (ARIA) | 39 |
| UK Official Christian & Gospel Albums (OCC) | 1 |
| US Billboard 200 | 68 |
| US Top Christian Albums (Billboard) | 1 |
| US Digital Albums (Billboard) | 10 |

=== Singles ===
| Year | Single | Peak positions | | |
| Year | Single | US Christian | Christian Airplay | Christian Digital Songs |
|---|---|---|---|---|
| 2017 | "Throne Room" | 17 | 22 | 3 |

=== Other charted songs ===
| Year | Song | Peak positions |
| Year | Song | US Christian |
|---|---|---|
| 2017 | "On My Side" | 33 |
| 2017 | "Fresh Outpouring" | 45 |
| 2017 | "Glimpse" | 47 |

== Release history ==
| Region | Date | Format | Label | Ref. |
|---|---|---|---|---|
| Worldwide | April 21, 2017 | CD | Jesus Culture Music | |
| Worldwide | April 21, 2017 | Digital download; streaming | Jesus Culture Music; Sparrow Records | |
