= Eleven22 Worship =

US musical group

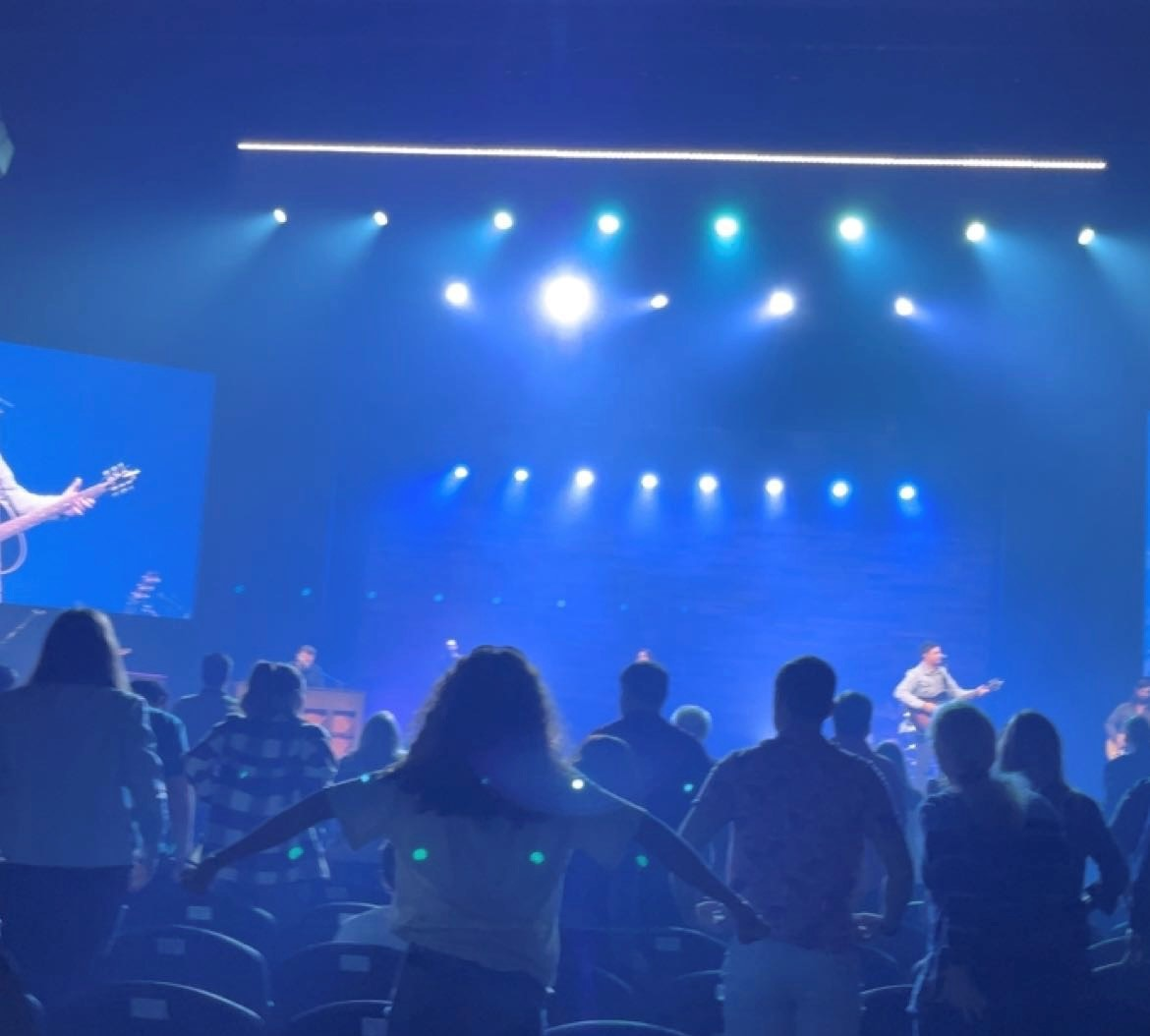
- Eleven22 Worship performing in 2023

Background information
- Also known as: Eleven22
- Origin: Jacksonville, Florida
- Genres: Worship, CCM
- Years active: 2010–present
- Members: Ben Williams; Gretchen Martin
- Website: coe22.com/worship

Eleven22 Worship (formerly, Eleven22) is an American Christian music worship band from Jacksonville, Florida. Their group formed at Beach United Methodist Church, then moved to The Church of Eleven22. They have released three independently made studio albums.

A lead member in the band, Gretchen Martin, launched The Church of Eleven22 as a non-denominational church in 2012 with her husband, Joby Martin. Joby serves as the lead pastor at the church, while Gretchen writes music and sings with the Eleven22 worship band.

== Background ==
Eleven22 Worship is from Jacksonville, Florida, where they were established in 2010, with four members, Ben Williams, Jonathan Berlin, Gretchen Martin and Maria Dunlap, while they were attending Beach United Methodist Church. They eventually moved to their own church, The Church of Eleven22.

== History ==
The band started as a musical entity in 2010, with their first independently-made studio album, Fall On Your Altar. Their subsequent studio album, The Reason, was released on May 15, 2012. They released, Before All Things, on September 4, 2015.

== Members ==
Current band members

- Ben Williams
- Gretchen Martin

Current pastor

- Joby Martin

== Discography ==
Albums

- Fall On Your Altar (2010)
- The Reason (May 15, 2012)
- Before All Things (September 4, 2015)
- Our God Is One (2020)
- Hymns (September 14, 2025)
