= The Reason (Eleven22 album) =

Studio album by Eleven22
- Released: May 15, 2012
- Genres: Worship, CCM
- Length: 66:24

Eleven22 chronology
Fall on Your Altar (2010)	The Reason (2012)	Before All Things (2015)

The Reason is the second studio album by Eleven22. They released the album on May 15, 2012.

== Critical reception ==
Professional ratings
Review scores
Source	Rating
CM Addict	3.5/5 stars
Cross Rhythms	10/10 squares
New Release Today	3.5/5 stars
The Phantom Tollbooth	3.5/5

Awarding the album three and a half stars at New Release Today, Kevin Davis writes, "[the listener will be] refreshed, nourished, encouraged, and turn to God for your strength." Tony Cummings, rating the album a perfect ten for Cross Rhythms, describes, "...this is one of the finest albums of modern worship". Indicating in a three and a half review from The Phantom Tollbooth, Derek Walker says, "Extremely well-executed praise music that pays tribute to a life that impacted many, and benefits orphanages around the world." Andrew Funderburk, giving the album three and a half stars by CM Addict, states, "Despite what may seem like flaws in my eyes, this project sends out a deeper strain of beauty because of what The Reason stands for."

== Track listing ==
Track list
No.	Title	Length
1.	"Found a Love"	4:41
2.	"God in Heaven"	5:18
3.	"My Heart Is Yours"	4:25
4.	"Hands of Kindness"	6:35
5.	"Burning Hearts"	6:35
6.	"Love like Fire"	4:52
7.	"We Bow Down"	2:44
8.	"I Belong to You"	5:39
9.	"Dress Us Up"	6:43
10.	"The Reason"	4:46
11.	"It Is Well"	7:35
12.	"God Alone"	6:31
Total length:		66:24
