= John Mark McMillan =

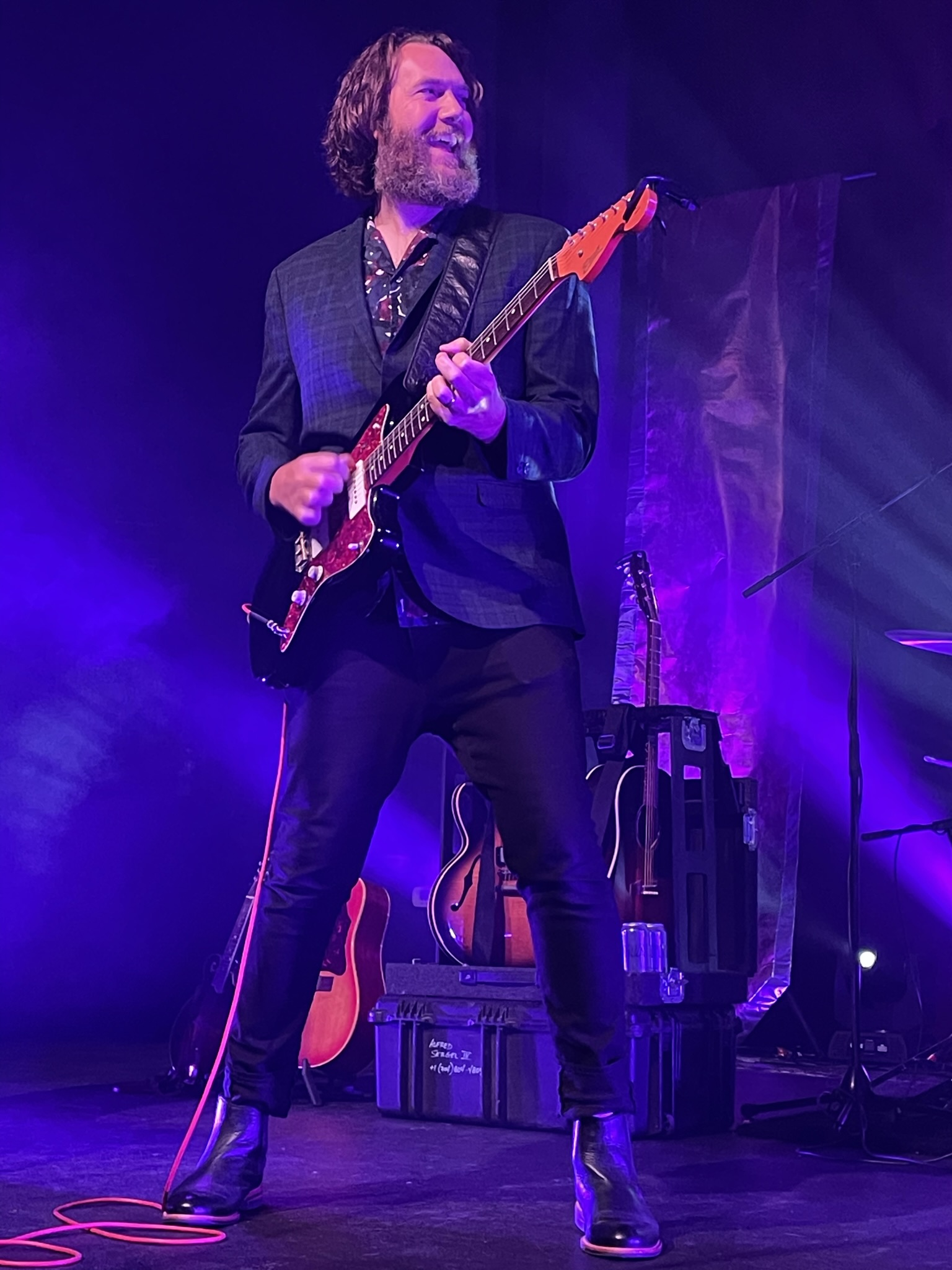
- McMillan performing in November 2021

Background information
- Born: November 27, 1979 (age 46); Charlotte, North Carolina, U.S.
- Genres: Alternative rock, contemporary worship
- Instruments: Vocals, guitar
- Years active: 2002–present
- Labels: Integrity Media, Lionhawk
- Website: johnmarkmcmillan.com

John Mark McMillan (born November 27, 1979) is an American singer, songwriter and musician.

== Early life and education ==
McMillan was born on November 27, 1979 in Charlotte. McMillan's parents are Robert "Robin" Agnew McMillan and Donna Boggs Wilson McMillan, and he is the eldest of four siblings—two younger brothers, Christopher Robin and Andrew Wilson, and his sister, Mary Kathryn. He grew up going to church.

== Career ==
In 2002, McMillan released his debut album Hope Anthology, Volume 1. This independent album was followed by The Song Inside: The Sounds of Breaking Down in 2005, which included the track "How He Loves". The song was successful despite the album's independent release, and has been covered by several well-known artists within the Christian music industry including the David Crowder Band. McMillan released his third album, The Medicine, independently in 2008, and re-released the same album under the Integrity Music label in 2010. Economy followed in 2011 with Integrity Music. In 2014, McMillan and Josh Lujan Loveless formed Lionhawk Records, and Borderland became the first album released under this new label. Borderland was released after a successful Kickstarter campaign, where he raised close to double the goal. The album debuted at No. 41 on the Billboard 200 and No. 4 on Billboard's Top Christian Album chart. McMillan's subsequent studio albums were all released via Lionhawk Records. His next studio album, Mercury & Lightning, was released in 2017, and it was followed by Peopled with Dreams in 2020, and Deep Magic in 2023. McMillan's most recent studio album is Cosmic Supreme, released in April 2025.

== Personal life ==
Consistent with his professional calling and the products of his work, McMillan has, since his early years and lifelong, expressed a commitment to a Christian faith.

McMillan is married to Sarah Kathryn McMillan (née Williams), who is from Vidalia, Georgia. They have three children.

== Discography ==
=== Studio albums ===
| Title | Album details | Peak chart positions | | | | | Sales |
| Title | Album details | US | US Christ. | US Rock | US Indie | UK C&G | Sales |
|---|---|---|---|---|---|---|---|
| Hope Anthology, Volume 1 | Released: December 20, 2002; Label: Independent | — | — | — | — | — | |
| The Song Inside The Sounds of Breaking Down | Released: November 29, 2005; Label: Independent | — | — | — | — | — | |
| The Medicine | Released: (2008) July 6, 2010; Label: Integrity | 185 | 8 | — | — | — | |
| Economy | Released: November 1, 2011; Label: Integrity | 95 | 6 | 23 | 16 | — | |
| Borderland | Released: March 4, 2014; Label: Independent | 41 | 3 | — | 7 | 5 | US: 21,000 |
| Mercury & Lightning | Released: September 1, 2017; Label: Lionhawk Records | — (Note: Mercury & Lightning did not enter the Billboard 200, but peaked at No. 39 on the Top Album Sales chart.) | 1 | 44 | — | — | |
| The Mercury Sessions | Released: June 29, 2018; Label: Lionhawk Records | — | — | — | — | — | |
| The Lightning Sessions | Released: August 10, 2018; Label: Lionhawk Records | — | — | — | — | — | |
| Peopled with Dreams | Released: February 14, 2020; Label: Lionhawk Records | — | 47 | — | — | — | |
| Deep Magic | Released: October 6, 2023; Label: Lionhawk Records | — | — | — | — | — | |
| Cosmic Supreme | Released: April 4, 2025; Label: Anotherland Records | — | — | — | — | — | |
"—" denotes releases that did not chart

=== Extended plays ===
| Title | EP details | Peak chart positions | Sales |
| Title | EP details | US Christ. | Sales |
|---|---|---|---|
| You Are the Avalanche | Released: June 23, 2015; Label: Lionhawk/Capitol | 3 | |
| Smile In the Mystery | Released: November 23, 2018; Label: Lionhawk | — | |

=== Live albums ===
| Title | Album details | Peak chart positions | | | Sales |
| Title | Album details | US Christ. | US Rock | UK C&G | Sales |
|---|---|---|---|---|---|
| Morningstar Harvest Worship Series: Awake, Volume One | Various artists compilation; Released: 2002; Label: Eaglestar Records | — | — | — | |
| The Borderland Sessions | Released: September 30, 2014; Label: Independent | 24 | — | 13 | |
| Live at the Knight | CD/DVD; Released: October 23, 2015; Label: Jesus Culture/Sparrow | 14 | 45 | — | |

=== Singles ===
- "Wilderlove" (2016)
- "No Country" (2016)
- "Enemy, love." (2017)
- "The Road, The Rocks, and The Weeds" (2019)
- "Bright Abyss" (2019)
- "Juggernaut" (2019)
- "Pilgrim" (2020)
- "Deliver Me" (2021)
- "Re-enchanted World" (2021)
- "Roaring Thunder" (2021)
- "Has It Been You" (2021)
- "Prove My Love" (2022)
- "Atlanta" (2022)
- "Ancient Love" (2025)
- "All My Life" (2025)
- "Heart's Delight" (2025)
