= Justin Jarvis =

American musician and guitarist (born 1979)

- Birth name: Justin Mathew Jarvis
- Born: June 21, 1979 (age 46) Birmingham, Alabama, U.S.
- Origin: Fort Lauderdale, Florida, U.S.
- Genres: CCM, Christian rock, Christian alternative rock, worship
- Occupation(s): Singer, songwriter, guitarist
- Instrument(s): Vocals, singer-songwriter, guitar
- Years active: 2012–present
- Labels: Jesus Culture
- Website: justinjarvis.tumblr.com

Justin Mathew Jarvis (born June 21, 1979) is an American Christian musician and guitarist, who serves as the worship direct of The Harbour Church in Pompano Beach, Florida. He started his recording career as part of Jesus Culture on their Emerging Voices album in 2012. His first solo album, Atmospheres, was released in 2014 by Jesus Culture Music and made the Billboard magazine charts.

== Early life ==
He was born on June 21, 1979, in Birmingham, Alabama, as Justin Mathew Jarvis. Jarvis started playing the guitar, while he was in high school, and this started his devotion towards music, in particular Christian music.

== Personal life ==
Jarvis married his college girlfriend, Janette Leong, in 2004, and the couple have four children together, Owen, Elliot, Emma and Isabelle, where they reside in Fort Lauderdale, Florida. He is the worship director at The Harbour Church, located in Pompano Beach, Florida, where he has been since 2002.

== Music career ==
His music career commenced in 2012, when he was a part of the Jesus Culture release, Emerging Voices, with Derek Johnson and two others. He released Atmospheres, a live album, on September 30, 2014, by Jesus Culture Music. This album was his breakthrough release on the Billboard magazine charts, where it placed at No. 46 on the Heatseekers Albums chart.

== Discography ==
=== Live albums ===
List of studio albums, with selected chart positions
Title	Album details	Peak chart positions
Title	Album details	US Heat
Atmospheres	Released: September 30, 2014; Label: Jesus Culture; CD, digital download	46
