= Chris McClarney =

American contemporary Christian musician (born 1979)

- Born: Christopher Andrew McClarney; November 30, 1979 (age 45)
- Origin: Nashville, Tennessee
- Genres: Contemporary Christian music, contemporary worship music
- Occupation(s): Singer, songwriter, guitarist
- Instrument(s): Vocals, guitar
- Years active: 2006–present
- Labels: Kingsway, Jesus Culture, Sparrow
- Website: chrismcclarney.com

Christopher Andrew McClarney (born November 30, 1979) is an American contemporary Christian musician. He released the independently made album Love Never Fails in 2008. His first release with Kingsway Music was an EP released in 2010, Introducing Chris McClarney. The first studio album, Defender, was released later in 2010 by Kingsway Music. The next release, a live album, Everything and Nothing Less, released on June 9, 2015 by Jesus Culture Music alongside Sparrow Records.

== Early life ==
McClarney was born on November 30, 1979, to a youth minister father, and this constantly made relocating part of his life story.

== Music career ==
His music career commenced in 2006, but his first album, Love Never Fails, was released independently on December 1, 2008. This album was reviewed by Cross Rhythms. His song co-written with Anthony Warren Skinner, "Your Love Never Fails", has been recorded by the Newsboys, on their album God's Not Dead. He released an EP, Introducing Chris McClarney, on January 26, 2010 by Kingsway Music. The EP was reviewed by AllMusic, Christian Music Review, Christianity Today, Cross Rhythms, Jesus Freak Hideout, and Louder Than the Music. His first studio album, Defender, was released on August 10, 2010 by Kingsway Music. The album was reviewed by AllMusic, Christian Music Review, Christian Music Zine, Cross Rhythms, Jesus Freak Hideout, and Louder Than the Music.

== Personal life ==
He is married to Jasmine, and together they reside in Franklin, Tennessee, with their three children; Aliya, Ceili and Charlotte (Charlie).

== Discography ==
=== Studio albums ===
- Love Never Fails (December 1, 2008, Independent)
- Defender (August 10, 2010, Kingsway)

=== Live albums ===
List of selected albums, with selected chart positions
Title	Album details	Peak chart positions	
Title	Album details	US Christ.	US Heat.
Everything and Nothing Less	Released: June 9, 2015; Label: Sparrow/Jesus Culture; Format: CD, Digital download, streaming	8	8
Breakthrough	Released: June 15, 2018; Label: Sparrow/Jesus Culture; Format: Digital download, streaming	13	—
"—" denotes a recording that did not chart or was not released in that territory.

=== Extended plays ===
List of selected albums, with selected chart positions
Title	Album details	Peak chart positions	
Title	Album details	US Christ.	US Heat.
Fill This Place (Live)	Released: November 1, 2019; Label: Sparrow/Jesus Culture; Format: Digital download, streaming	—	—
Café Sessions	Released: August 7, 2020	—	—
Speak To The Mountains	Released: July 23, 2021	—	—

=== Singles ===
Single	Year	Chart positions		Album
Single	Year	US Christ	Christ Airplay	Album
"Hallelujah For The Cross"	2018	47	32	Breakthrough
"I'm Listening" (featuring Hollyn)	2019	40	28	Breakthrough
"Valley"	2019	—	—	Fill This Place (EP)
"Speak To The Mountains"	2021	—	—	Speak To The Mountains (EP)
"Empty"	2024	—	—	—
