= Derek Johnson (musician) =

American Christian musician (born 1987)

- Born: March 5, 1987 (age 38); Roselawn, Indiana
- Origin: Sacramento, California
- Genres: CCM, Christian rock, Christian alternative rock, worship
- Occupation(s): Singer, songwriter
- Instrument(s): Vocals, singer-songwriter
- Years active: 2009–present
- Labels: Jesus Culture, Sparrow

Derek Johnson (born March 5, 1987) is an American Christian musician. His first release was with Jesus Culture, Emerging Voices, with band member, Justin Jarvis, and it was released in 2012, yet he joined the group in 2009. The first album, Real Love, was released in 2015 by Jesus Culture Music alongside Sparrow Records. This album was his breakthrough release upon the Billboard magazine charts.

== Early life ==
He was born on March 5, 1987 in Roselawn, Indiana, the youngest of six brothers, and he departed for Redding, California to attend Bethel Church in 2007, after his girlfriend graduated high school.

== Personal life ==
Johnson married Becky Fox in 2008, when they resided in Redding, California, yet the couple presently reside in Sacramento, California with their child.

== Music career ==
Johnson's music career started in 2009, when he became a part of Jesus Culture, and he was featured on their 2012 release, Emerging Voices, with band member Justin Jarvis. The first album, Real Love, was released on April 7, 2015, after he turned 28 years old, by Jesus Culture Music alongside Sparrow Records. This album was his breakthrough release upon the Billboard magazine charts, placing on the Christian Albums at No. 17, while peaking at No. 9 on the Heatseekers Albums chart.

== Discography ==
=== Studio albums ===
List of studio albums, with selected chart positions
Title	Album details	Peak chart positions	
Title	Album details	US Christ	US Heat
Real Love	Released: April 7, 2015; Label: Jesus Culture/Sparrow; CD, digital download	17	9
