= Jesus Culture =

American Christian organization

- Formation: 1999
- Headquarters: Sacramento, California, U.S.
- Website: jesusculture.com

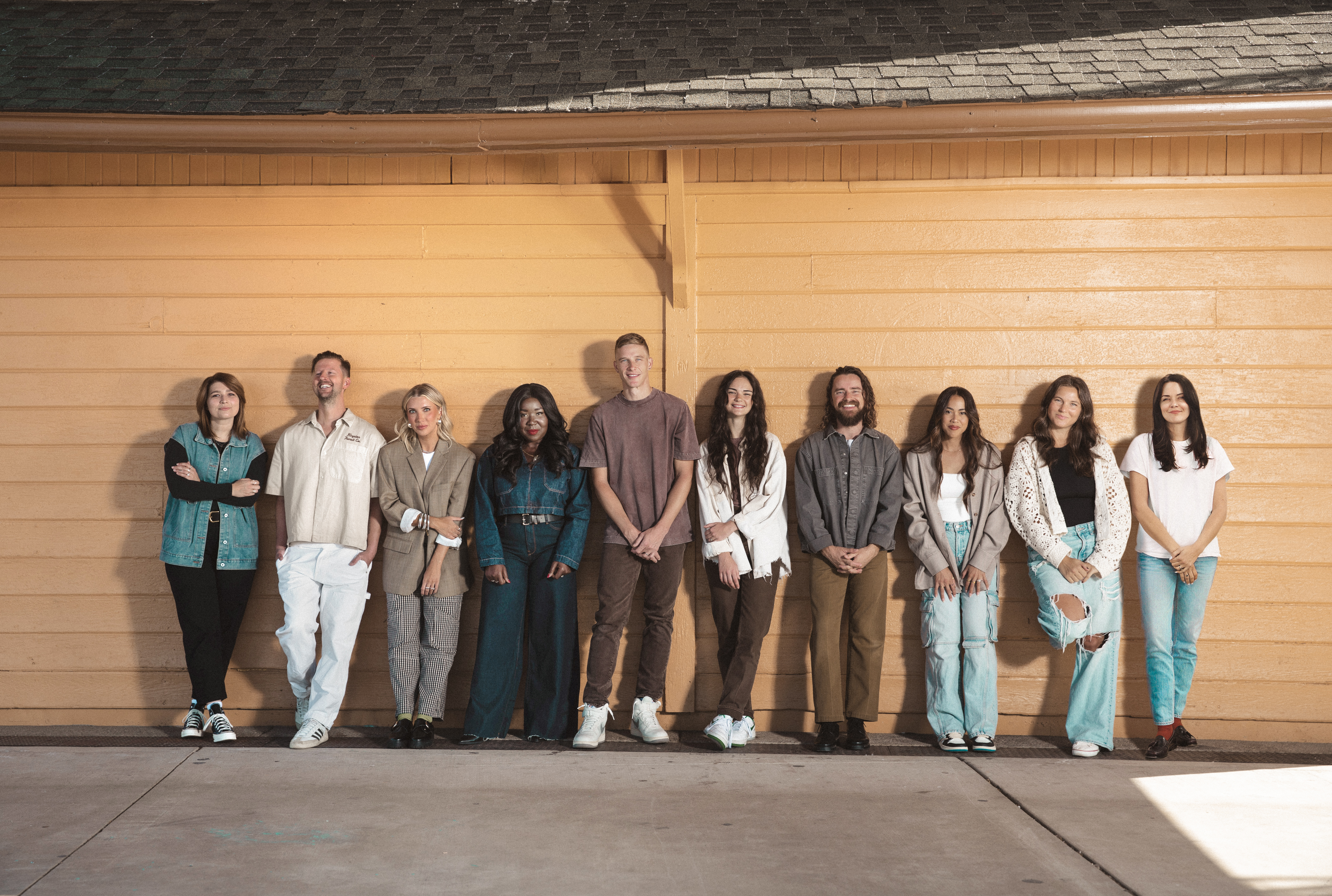

Jesus Culture is a Christian revivalist youth-oriented organization that was formed at the Bethel Church of Redding, California, in the United States. Jesus Culture Ministry hosts conferences and operates a record label, Jesus Culture Music. In 2013, Jesus Culture moved to plant a church in Sacramento. Meetings started on September 14, 2014.

Jesus Culture is a ministry that entails planting churches, hosting conferences, and evangelising the gospel of Jesus Christ. Jesus Culture has expanded since its inception, and it now hosts churches in Sacramento CA San Diego CA and Cambridge UK

== Background ==
In late 1999, the youth group at Bethel Church in Redding, California, led by youth pastor Banning Liebscher, launched the first Jesus Culture conference. Tony Cummings, music editor of Cross Rhythms, described the ministry as "one of the most significant Christian movements in post-war America".

According to Jesus Culture's website, "The heart of these gatherings was to serve other churches and lead young people to experience the radical love of God."

In 2013, Jesus Culture moved to Sacramento to plant a church, and meetings started at Folsom High School on September 14, 2014.

== Conferences ==
Jesus Culture now hosts an annual conference in Sacramento, California and periodically host conferences around the globe. The conferences bring thousands of young people from around the world to the host cities.

The conferences bring together a number of pastors and ministers to preach to the conference attendees. Worship is led through song, featuring a number of worship leaders.

== Jesus Culture Music ==
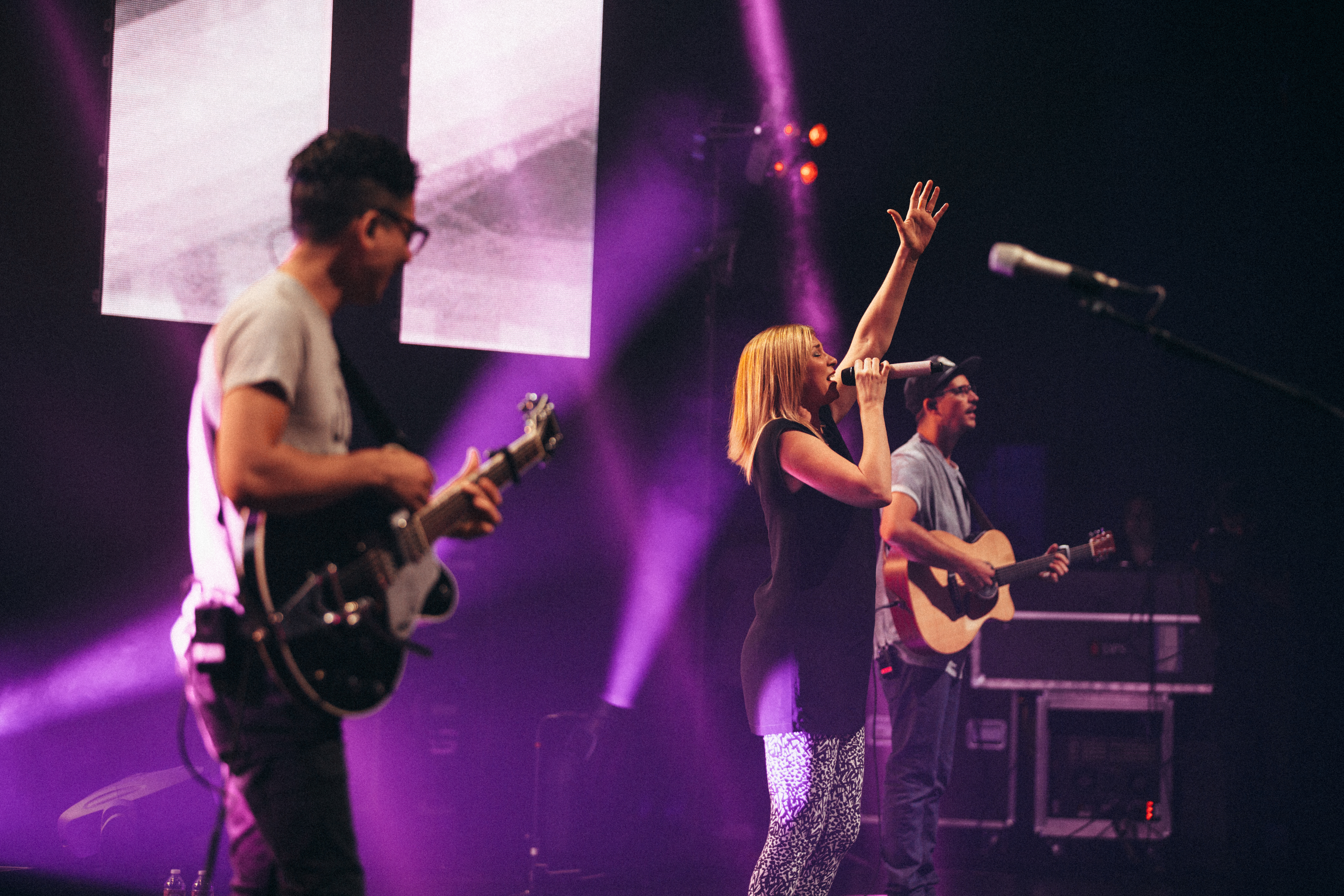
Jesus Culture performing in 2014

Jesus Culture Music is the music label and Grammy-nominated worship music band of the Jesus Culture organization. Its albums feature the worship of the Jesus Culture Sacramento, performing a mix of original and cover songs.

Youth worship leaders Kim Walker-Smith, Melissa How and Chris Quilala, long active with the youth group at Bethel Church in Redding, became the core of the Jesus Culture band. Jesus Culture states the purpose of music in their movement is to "ignite revival in the nations of the earth; to compel the Body of Christ to radically abandon itself to a lifestyle of worship; to encounter His extravagant love and raw power."

Since 2006, the band has released a number of albums on the Jesus Culture Music label. Their 2011 album, Awakening (Live from Chicago), appeared at No. 133 on the Canadian SoundScan charts. Christianity Today negatively reviewed the album, criticizing it for "amps of staggering sound leave little room for thoughtful reflection or deliberate contemplation", while Jesus Freak Hideout praised it for its "very overt sense of passion for the LORD and worshiping him."

The tenth album, Unstoppable Love, was released in June 2014. Some critics called it "one of their best", "passionate", and "powerful", while others said it was "a missed opportunity for the band to push themselves a little more musically" other than another CD with musicality that "get[s] bigger and bigger, wider and wider."

Jesus Culture's thirteenth album, Living With a Fire was nominated for the 2019 Grammy Award for Best Contemporary Christian Music Album.

=== Discography ===
- Everything (2006)
- We Cry Out (2007)
- Here Is My Song (Kim Walker-Smith) (2008)
- Your Love Never Fails (2008)
- Those Who Dream (Kristene DiMarco) (2008)
- Marked by Heaven (Jake Hamilton) (2009)
- Consumed (2009)
- My Passion (EP) (2010)
- Come Away (2010)
- Freedom Calling (Jake Hamilton) (2011)
- Here On Earth (Bryan & Katie Torwalt) (2011)
- Awakening: Live from Chicago (2011)
- Safe Place (Kristene DiMarco) (2012)
- Overcome (Heather Clark) (2012)
- Emerging Voices (2012)
- Live from New York with Martin Smith (2012)
- Still Believe (Kim Walker-Smith) (2013)
- Home (Kim Walker-Smith & Skyler Smith) (2013)
- Kingdom Come (Bryan & Katie Torwalt) (2013)
- Our Love (EP) (Josh & Amberley Klinkenberg) (2013)
- Jesus Culture Reconstructed Volume 1 (Remix Album) (2014)
- Unstoppable Love (2014)
- Atmospheres (Justin Jarvis) (2014)
- When Christmas Comes (Kim Walker-Smith) (2014)
- Children of Promise (Andrew Ehrenzeller) (2015)
- Real Love (Derek Johnson) (2015)
- This Is Jesus Culture (2015)
- Esto Es Jesús Culture (2015)
- Everything And Nothing Less (Chris McClarney) (2015)
- Mighty (Kristene DiMarco) (2015)
- Live at the Knight (John Mark McMillan) (2015)
- Let It Echo (2016)
- Let It Echo Unplugged (2016)
- Champion (Bryan & Katie Torwalt) (2016)
- Jesus Culture em Português (2016)
- Split the Sky (Chris Quilala) (2016)
- On My Side (Kim Walker-Smith) (2017)
- Love Has a Name (2017)
- Christmas (EP) (Bryan & Katie Torwalt) (2017)
- On My Side Live (Kim Walker-Smith) (2018)
- Breakthrough (Chris McClarney) (2018)
- Living With a Fire (2018)
- Praise Before My Breakthrough (EP) (Bryan & Katie Torwalt) (2018)
- Anticipation (EP) (Bryan & Katie Torwalt) (2019)
- Fill This Place (EP) (Chris McClarney) (2019)
- Church (Volume 1/Live) (2020)
- Church (Volume 2/Live) (2020)
- Sounds from the House (Vol.1) (2024)

== Artists ==
Current members

- Derek Johnson
- Bryan & Katie Torwalt
- Lindsey Arcaro
- Marie Welch
- Zoe Gonzalez
- Ruthie Ridley
- Brett Lee Miller
- Myriah Grubbs
- Kristene DiMarco

Past members

- Justin Jarvis
- Melissa How
- Kim Walker-Smith
- Chris Quilala
- Chris McClarney
