= Kim Walker-Smith =

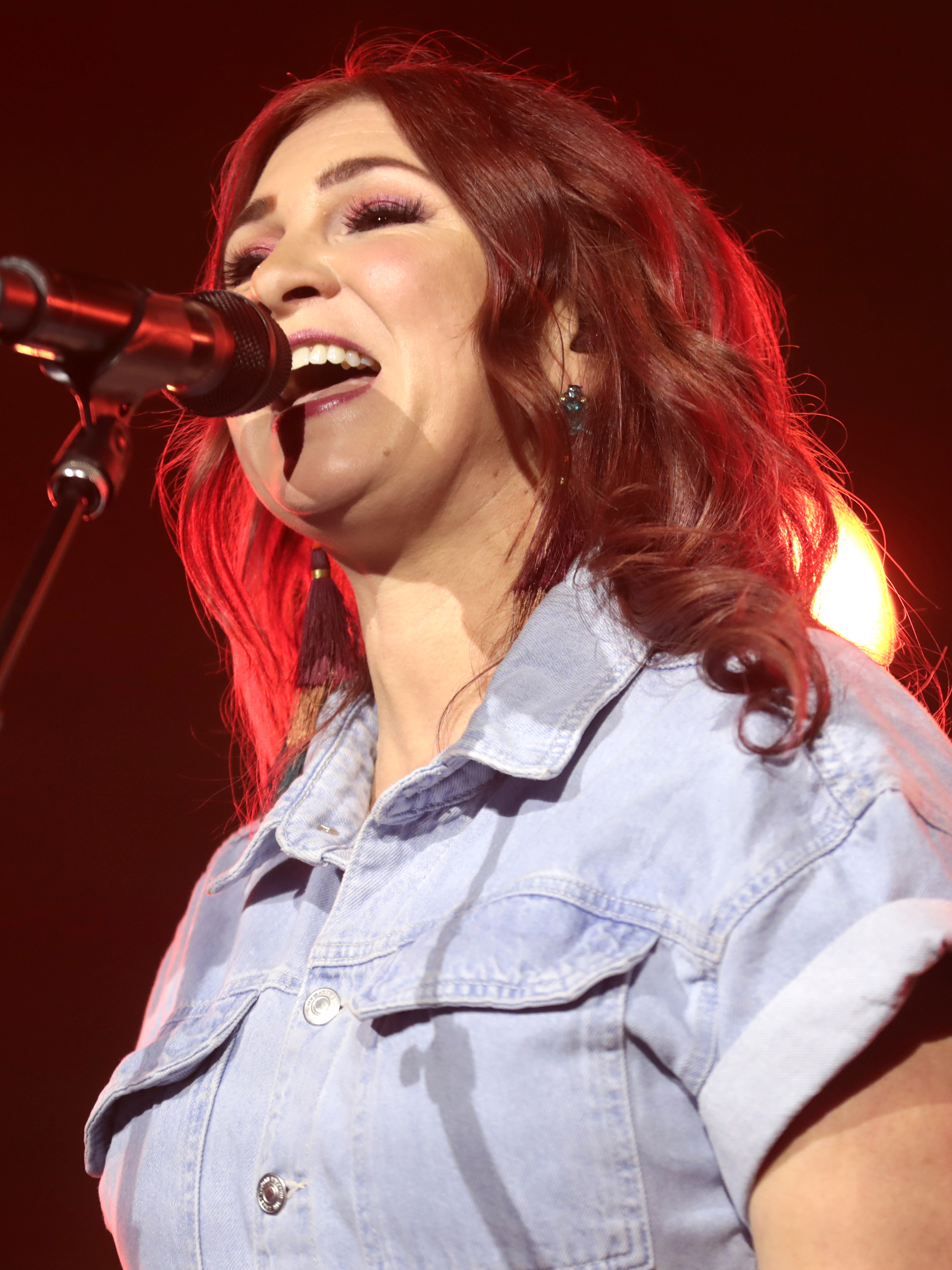
- Walker-Smith in 2022

Background information
- Born: Kimberlee Dawn Walker; December 19, 1981 (age 44); Albany, Oregon, U.S.
- Origin: Redding, California, U.S.
- Genres: Contemporary worship music
- Occupations: Singer, songwriter and worship leader
- Instrument: Vocals
- Label: Jesus Culture

Kim Walker-Smith (born December 19, 1981, as Kimberlee Dawn Walker) is an American singer, songwriter, worship leader, and recording artist. She produced her first solo album, Here Is My Song, which was released in February 2008 through the Jesus Culture record label. Walker-Smith was best known as the worship leader for the Jesus Culture Band and Jesus Culture events, and was also known as a worship pastor for Bethel Church in Redding, California

Her rendition of the John Mark McMillan song "How He Loves" has been viewed over 27 million times on YouTube. Her rendition of Brian Johnson's and Jon Mohr's song "Where You Go I Go" has over 11 million views on YouTube.

== Early life ==
Kim Walker was born in Albany, Oregon, and "raised in a small farm town called Klamath Falls, Oregon." Her parents divorced when she was four years old. Her family moved frequently, causing her to be shy and withdrawn as a result of always being "the new kid". Walker stated that her family "for generations has been very musical and my mom put me on a stage when I was three. I grew up singing and was very involved in musical theater." Walker gave her life to God when she was eighteen years old. During a challenging season in her life while attending Bethel, she received a vision about the love God had for her, and was a changed person after that encounter.

In her early adulthood, Walker moved to Redding, California, to attend a Christian college, but was struggling with her grades and wasn't happy attending university. One night while driving around she cried out to the Lord, and came across a 24-hour prayer house that had been recently set up by Bethel Church. Venturing inside, Walker was captivated and attended their church service the following Sunday. After a year she left university to attend the Bethel School of Supernatural Ministry (BSSM). She graduated from the BSSM after completing their two-year program, and after two more years was hired by the church as a worship pastor. Walker has stated that the "greatest desire of [her] heart is to see God's kingdom and power manifest for people to be set free, healed, and radically changed as they encounter God in worship."

== Musical career ==
In 2005, Walker's "powerful voice won her $25,000 cash in an American Idol type of competition called So You Want to Be a Star, which aired on Chico television station KRVU. She is considered by many to be a forerunner in a new kind of worship referred to as prophetic worship." Walker has cited Misty Edwards of the International House of Prayer and Suzy Yaraei of Morning Star Ministries, both prominent worship leaders in the evangelical community, as her greatest musical influences.

In 2009, Walker married worship leader Skyler William Smith, and has since released music under the name Kim Walker-Smith instead of her maiden name. In addition to her career of solo albums, she is also a member of the band Jesus Culture, which began as a youth worship band at Bethel, but now hosts multiple worship conferences around the country and produces a live record each year, in addition to frequently leading worship at Bethel. In 2010, Walker-Smith stated that she was "at Bethel once to twice a month right now. We travel about three to four times a month. About 40 percent of that is Jesus Culture." She has also expressed a desire for her music to expand into the secular community, expressing a passion for social justice and "to see the arts and creativity restored and a new standard set". "I've always looked at music as a vehicle to get me to people".

On July 16, 2013, Walker-Smith and her husband Skyler released Home, their first album together. In December 2016, Walker-Smith announced she was working on another Jesus Culture album. In early March, Jesus Culture announced that Walker-Smith would be releasing her first solo album since 2013, titled On My Side, on April 21. The album reached No. 1 on Billboard's Top Christian Albums Chart as of May 13, 2017.

== Personal life ==
Walker-Smith and Skyler Smith have three children together, two sons and a daughter.

=== Political views ===
In 2020, Walker-Smith released "Worth the Fight," which served as the theme song for The Trump I Know, a film released during the 2020 presidential campaign.

In 2022, Walker-Smith expressed support on her social media accounts for the Dobbs v. Jackson Women's Health Organization decision overturning Roe v. Wade.

== Discography ==
=== Studio albums ===
List of studio albums, with selected chart positions
Title	Album details	Peak chart positions	
Title	Album details	US	US Christ.
Here Is My Song (as Kim Walker)	Released: February 5, 2008	—	—
Home (with Skyler Smith)	Released: 2013	47	2
On My Side	Released: April 21, 2017	68	1

=== Live albums ===
List of live albums, with selected chart positions
Title	Album details	Peak chart positions	
Title	Album details	US	US Christ.
Still Believe	Released: February 15, 2013	39	2
On My Side (Live)	Released: April 6, 2018	—	—
Wild Heart	Released: August 14, 2020	— (Note: Wild Heart did not enter the Billboard 200, but peaked at No. 84 on the Top Album Sales chart.)	12
Let Us Worship – Azusa (with Sean Feucht)	Released: March 3, 2021	—	33
Revival Nights	Released: July 16, 2021	—	—

=== EPs ===
List of EPs albums, with selected chart positions
Title	Album details	Peak chart positions		
Title	Album details	US	US Christ.	US Latin Pop
No Temeré	Released: January 8, 2021	-	-	-

=== Holiday albums ===
List of Holiday albums, with selected chart positions
Title	Album details	Peak chart positions		
Title	Album details	US	US Christ.	US Holiday
When Christmas Comes	Released: October 23, 2014	95	7	8

=== Singles ===
==== As lead artist ====
List of singles, with selected chart positions and certifications
Title	Year	Peak chart positions				Album
Title	Year	US Christ.	US Christ. Airplay	US Christ. Digital	US AC	Album
"Carols of the Bells"	2014	25	31	—	13	When Christmas Comes
"Throne Room"	2017	17	22	3	—	On My Side
"Love Came Down"	2018	34	28	—	—	non-album single
"Just Be"	2019	42	—	—	—	non-album single
"Insatiable"	2019	—	—	—	—	non-album single
"Worth the Fight"	2020	—	—	—	—	non-album single
"Teu Espírito" (with Gabriela Rocha)	2020	—	—	—	—	non-album single
"Seu Nome É Amor" (with Gabriela Rocha)	2020	—	—	—	—	non-album single
"Boxes"	2024	—	—	—	—	non-album single
"Let Revival In"	2024	—	—	—	—	non-album single
"Trample"	2024	—	—	—	—	non-album single

==== As a featured artist ====
List of singles, with selected chart positions
Title	Year	Peak chart positions		Album
Title	Year	US Christ.	US Christ. Airplay	Album
"In The River" (Jesus Culture featuring Kim Walker-Smith)	2016	27	—	Let It Echo
"Alive in You" (Jesus Culture featuring Kim Walker-Smith)	2017	39	33	Let It Echo
"Love Has a Name" (Jesus Culture featuring Kim Walker-Smith)	2017	38	40	Love Has a Name
"Freedom" (Jesus Culture featuring Kim Walker-Smith)	2018	31	25	Living With a Fire

=== Other charted songs ===
List of charting songs, with selected chart positions
Title	Year	Peak chart positions	Album
Title	Year	US Christ	Album
"On My Side"	2017	33	On My Side
"Fresh Outpouring"	2017	45	On My Side
"Glimpse"	2017	47	On My Side

== Awards and nominations ==
Kim Walker-Smith, with her worship band, Jesus Culture, was nominated for Best Contemporary Christian Music Album at the 61st Annual Grammy Awards for their album, Living With a Fire.
