= Bryan & Katie Torwalt =

American Christian music duo

- Origin: Sacramento, California, U.S.
- Genres: CCM, Christian rock, Christian alternative rock, worship
- Years active: 2006–present
- Labels: Jesus Culture, Kingsway
- Members: Bryan Torwalt; Katie Torwalt

Bryan & Katie Torwalt are an American Christian music husband and wife duo from Sacramento, California who started their music recording careers in 2006. The first album, Here on Earth, was released in 2011 by Jesus Culture Music alongside Kingsway Music. It became their Billboard magazine breakthrough release. Their second album, Kingdom Come, was released by the aforementioned labels in 2013, and performed even better on the Billboard magazine charts. They released a self-titled album in 2015, Bryan & Katie Torwalt, again with the two labels mentioned earlier, although this album did not place on any Billboard magazine charts.

== Background ==
The duo met for the first-time at a Bethel Ministry event in Redding, California in 2006, and they began dating, eventually marrying in 2009.

== Music history ==
The husband and wife duo commenced their recording careers in 2011 with the album Here on Earth, released on September 13, 2011 by Jesus Culture Music in association with Kingsway Music. This album was their breakthrough release on the Billboard magazine charts, where it placed at No. 24 on the Christian Albums chart and No. 24 on the Heatseekers Albums chart. Their second release, Kingdom Come, was released by Jesus Culture Music alongside Kingsway Music on October 15, 2013. The album placed even better on the Billboard magazine charts, reaching No. 43 on The Billboard 200 as well as No. 3 on the Christian Albums chart and No. 5 on the Independent Albums chart. They released Bryan & Katie Torwalt with Jesus Culture Music and Kingsway Music on April 7, 2015, although this album did not place on any Billboard magazine charts.

== Members ==
- Bryan James Torwalt (born June 14, 1985 in Canada)
- Katelin Michelle "Katie" Torwalt (née Horn) (born August 14, 1988 in Sonoma County, California)
- Daniel Owen Wible (born August 3, 1988 in Waco, Texas)
- Chason Tyler Ford (born June 30, 1993 in Honolulu, HI)

== Discography ==
=== Albums ===
List of studio albums, with selected chart positions
Title	Album details	Peak chart positions				
Title	Album details	US	US Christ.	US Ind.	US Heat.	AUS
Here on Earth	Released: September 13, 2011; Label: Jesus Culture/Kingsway; Format: CD	—	24	—	24	—
Kingdom Come	Released: October 15, 2013; Label: Jesus Culture/Kingsway; Formats: CD, download	43	3	5	—	—
Bryan & Katie Torwalt	Released: April 7, 2015; Label: Jesus Culture; Formats: CD, download	—	—	—	—	—
Champion	Released: July 29, 2016; Label: Jesus Culture/Sparrow; Formats: CD, download	71	3	—	—	75

=== EPs ===
List of extended plays, with selected chart positions
Title	Album details	Peak chart positions
Title	Album details	US Christ.
Christmas	Released: October 13, 2017; Label: Jesus Culture/Sparrow; Formats: CD, digital download	—
Praise Before My Breakthrough	Released: November 16, 2018; Label: Jesus Culture/Sparrow; Formats: CD, digital download	14
Anticipation	Released: October 18, 2019; Label: Jesus Culture/Sparrow; Formats: CD, digital download	50
