= Majestic =

Majestic or The Majestic may refer to:

== Arts and entertainment ==
=== Film ===
- The Majestic (film), a 2001 film starring Jim Carrey
- Majestic (film), a 2002 Indian film
- The main antagonist of 50 Cent's 2005 film Get Rich or Die Tryin'

=== Novel ===
- Majestic, 1989 novel by Whitley Strieber

=== Music ===
==== Bands and artists ====
- Majestic (band), a power metal band
- Majestic (musician), English DJ and record producer

==== Albums ====
- Majestic (Gamma Ray album), 2005
- Majestic, 2010, by ReinXeed
- Majestic (Kari Jobe album), 2014
- Majestic: Revisited, a 2015 Kari Jobe album

==== Songs ====
- "Majestic", by Journey from Captured, 1981
- "Majestic", by Wax Fang, 2008
- "Majestic", by B'z from New Love, 2019
- "The Majestic", by Dion from Runaround Sue, 1961

=== Other uses in arts and entertainment ===
- Majestic (video game), a 2001 alternate reality video game
- Mr. Majestic, a WildStorm Comics superhero

== Buildings ==
- Majestic Building (disambiguation)
- Majestic Cinema (disambiguation)
- Majestic Hotel (disambiguation), a list of hotels, including those named Hotel Majestic
- Majestic Theatre (disambiguation)

== Businesses ==
- Majestic Athletic, a sportswear company
- Majestic Film Company, also known as Majestic Motion Pictures, a film studio established in 1911 in California
- Majestic Hotel Group, a Catalan hotel group based in Barcelona
- Majestic International Cruises, a cruise line based in Greece
- The Majestic Line, a cruise line based in Scotland
- Majestic Percussion, a Dutch manufacturer of percussion musical instruments
- Majestic Pictures, an American film production and distribution company active during the 1930s
- Majestic Realty Co., a commercial real estate developer based in Los Angeles
- Majestic Radio, an American radio brand from 1927 to 1955, produced by the Majestic Radio & Television Corporation up to 1949
- Majestic Record Corporation, an American record label in 1916 and 1917
- Majestic Records, a mid-20th century record label
- Majestic Wine, a chain of stores selling alcoholic beverages in the United Kingdom
- Café Majestic, Porto, Portugal

== Places ==
- Majestic, Kentucky, United States, an unincorporated community
- Mount Majestic (Victoria), Australia
- Mount Majestic (Utah), United States

== Military ==
- HMS Majestic, five Royal Navy ships
- Majestic-class battleship, a Royal Navy class of pre-dreadnoughts built in the mid-1890s
- Operation Majestic, a plan for the invasion of Japan during World War II

== Sports ==
- Majestic FC, a football club in Burkina Faso
- Seattle Majestics, an American women's football team, formerly the Tacoma Majestics

== Transportation ==
- Majestic (ship), various ships
- Majestic (riverboat), a riverboat/theatre in Cincinnati, Ohio on the National Register of Historic Places
- Daimler Majestic, a luxury car produced from 1958 to 1962
- Majestic, one of the GWR 3031 Class locomotives built for the British Great Western Railway, 1891–1915
- Majestic, a 100,000 cubic feet (2,800 m^{3}) balloon owned by British aviation pioneer Patrick Young Alexander in 1893
- Majestic metro station, Bangalore, India
- Majestic Bus Station, the old name for Kempegowda Bus Station in Bangalore, India
- The Majestic Line, a cruise line based in Scotland
- Austral Pacific Majestic, Australian road coach

== See also ==
- Majestic 12, or Majic 12, supposedly a secret committee formed in 1947 to investigate UFO activity, origin of The Majestic Documents
- Majestic Alley, a Belizean street gang
- Starship Majestic, a cruise ship of Premier Cruise Lines 1988–1994, launched as Spirit of London in 1972
