= Hôtel Raphael =

Building in the 16th arrondissement, Paris

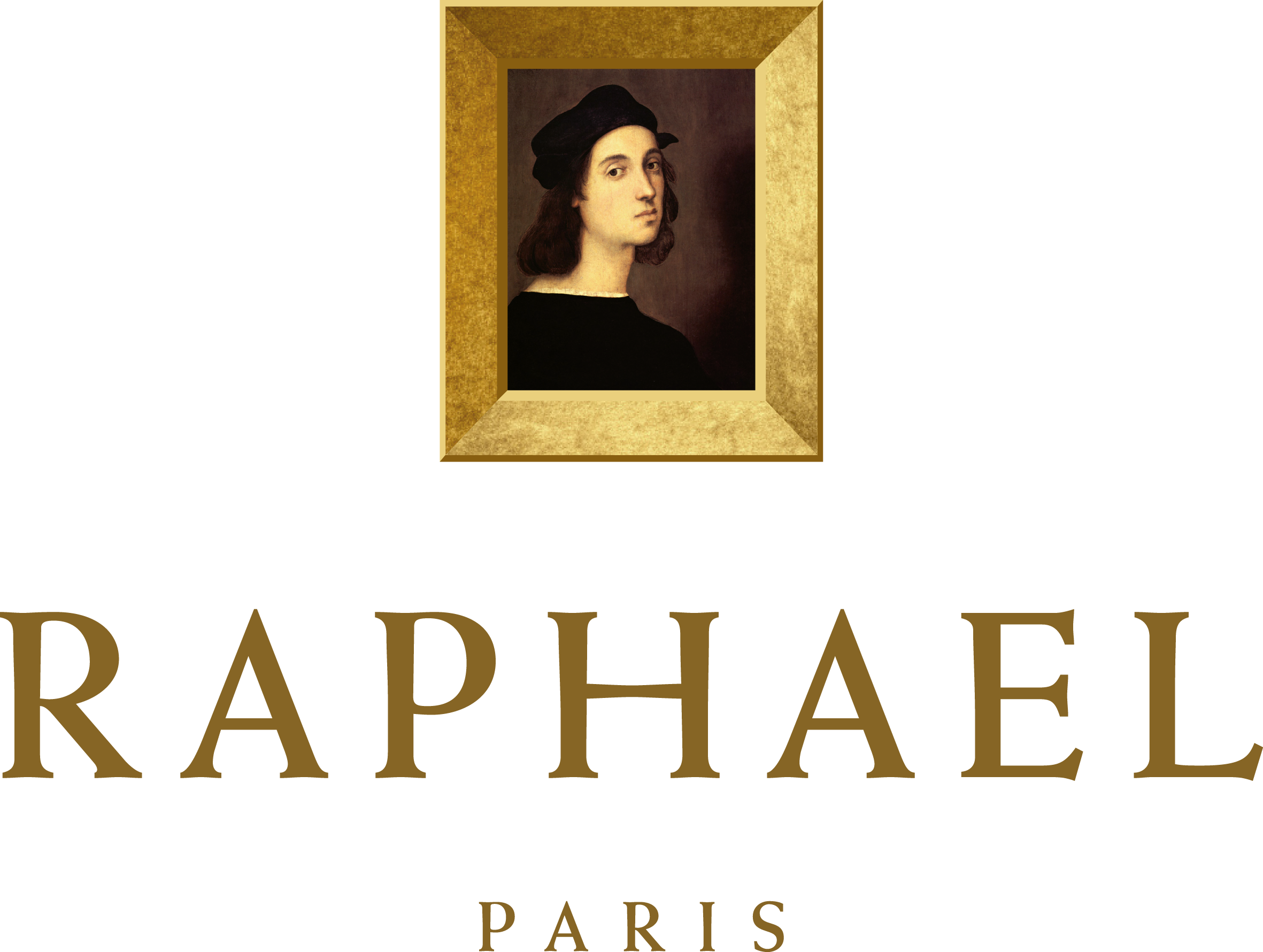

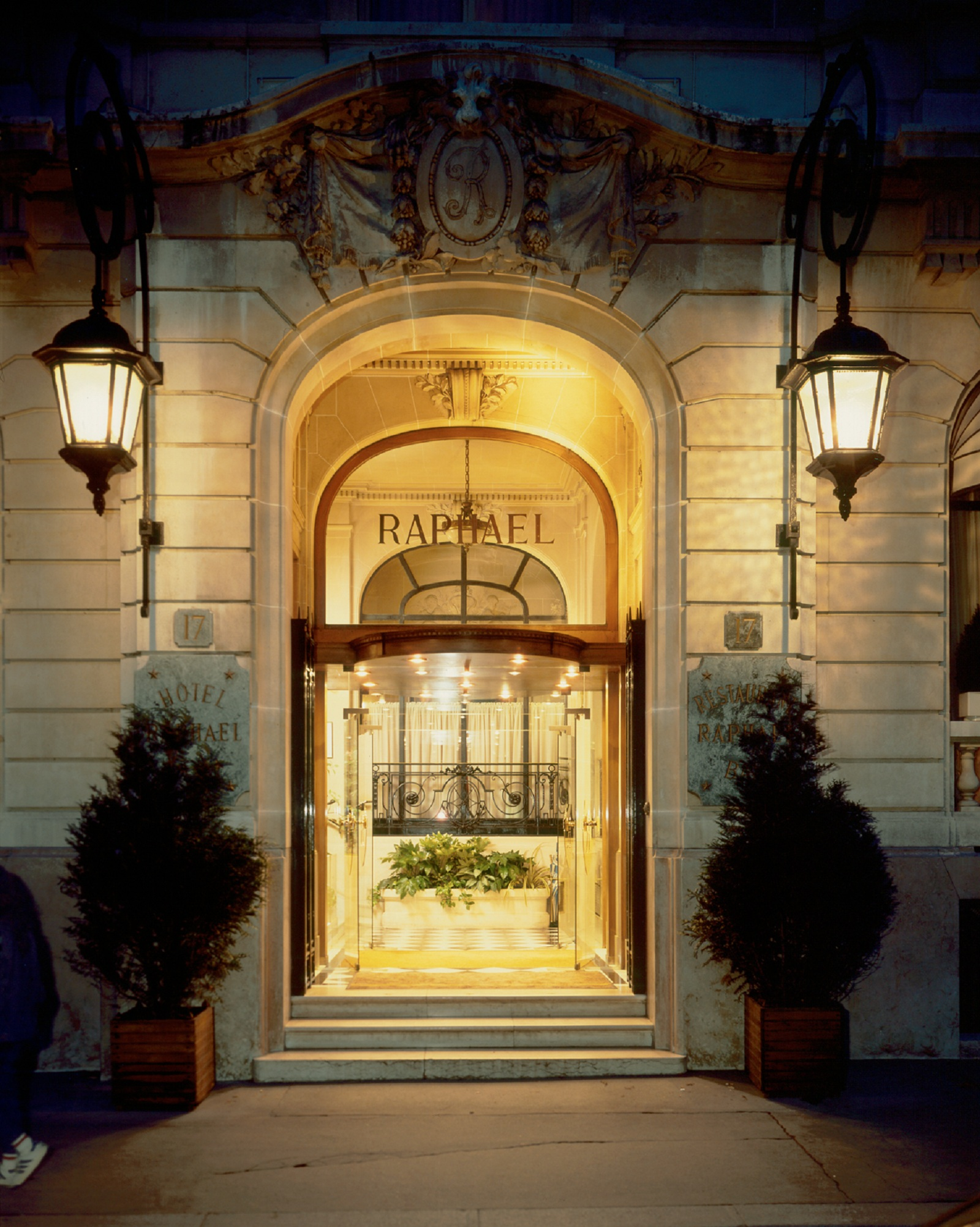

General information
- Location: 17 avenue Kléber, 16th arrondissement, Paris
- Coordinates: 48°52′17″N 2°17′37″E
- Opened: 1925
- Operator: Les Hôtels Baverez

Technical details
- Floor count: 7

Design and construction
- Architect: André Rousselot

Other information
- Number of rooms: 83
- Number of restaurants: 3

Website
- raphael-hotel.com

Hôtel Raphael is a French luxury hotel situated on Avenue Kléber in the 16th arrondissement of Paris. It is a five-star hotel and belongs to Les Hôtels Baverez. During the German occupation of Paris, the hotel was the principal billet for senior officers of the SS, Gestapo and Wehrmacht.

== History ==
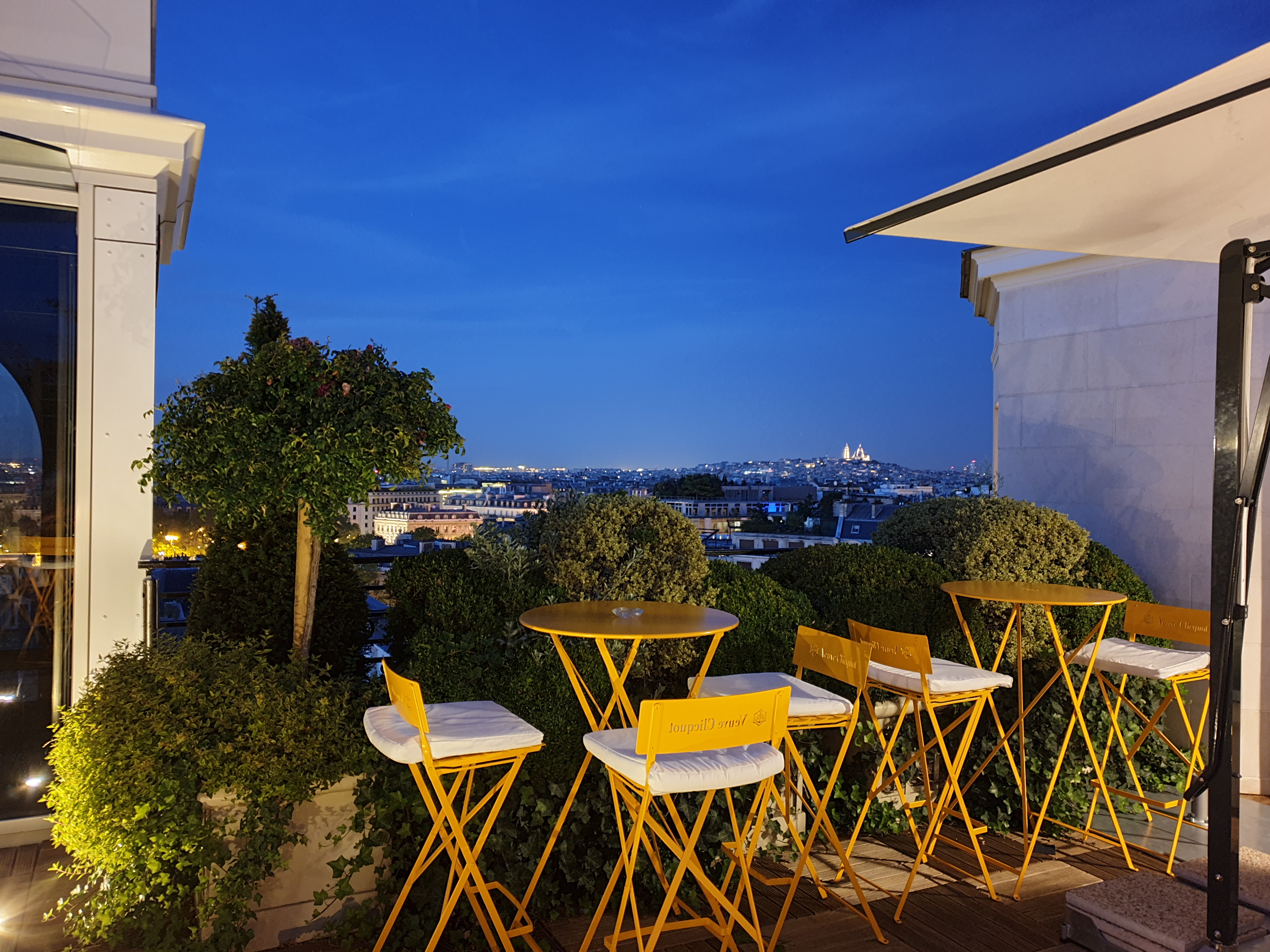
Rooftop at the Hôtel Raphael in Paris in 2019

The hotel was constructed in 1925 through the initiative of Léonard Tauber and Constant Baverez, co-founders of the Regina (1900) and the Majestic (1908). It was constructed in the Golden Twenties era and designed by architect André Rousselot. Decorated in the Art Deco style, it was named as a tribute to the painter Raphael and the fine arts.

The hotel has been a popular venue for well-known French and international artists, politicians and famous personalities. A number of films have been shot there, including Love in Paris (1996), Place Vendôme (1998), and the short Hotel Chevalier (2007). Scenes from the hotel have also been used in Le Magnifique (1973), Gramps Is in the Resistance (Papy fait de la résistance, 1983), and Mr. and Mrs. Bridge (1990). The Raphael became the base of operations and home to the Hollywood company of Gigi (1958) when they filmed in Paris in 1957. Lyricist and screenwriter Alan Jay Lerner and his collaborator, composer Frederick Loewe, wrote most of their celebrated Gigi score in their suite. The hotel's sixth floor was turned into the film company's production offices for the duration of the shoot.

Hollywood actors such as Ava Gardner, Katharine Hepburn, Charles Bronson, Yul Brynner, Henry Fonda, Clark Gable, Grace Kelly, Burt Lancaster, Steve McQueen, Roger Moore, Kirk Douglas, Gary Cooper and Marlon Brando were regular guests. The Venezuelan filmmaker Margot Benacerraf also stayed at the hotel.

After the German army occupied Paris in May 1940, the hotel became home to senior officers of the SS, Gestapo and the Wehrmacht. Many of these officers worked at the Majestic, situated opposite the Raphael on avenue des Portugais. The Raphael was the site of many disputes between Nazi Party officials and senior staff officers of the Wehrmacht and the Militärbefehlshaber Frankreich. The famed German author Ernst Jünger was resident at the Raphael as a Wehrmacht captain in 1941–42 and 1943–44. Jünger wrote many of the entries for his war journals within its confines.

== Characteristics ==
Hôtel Raphael is a five-star hotel located at 17 avenue Kléber in the 16th arrondissement. It is approximately 15 metres (49 ft) from the Champs-Élysées, and some rooms have views of the Eiffel Tower or the Arc de Triomphe.

The hotel has 83 bedrooms over seven floors, as well as six conference rooms. The latter are in the former apartments of Léonard Taubert. The hotel has been managed by the Baverez family for several generations, along with Hôtel Regina and Majestic Hôtel-Spa.

== Restaurant ==
Hôtel Raphael offers fine dining with chef Étienne Barrier since 2014, succeeding Amandine Chaignot. Nina Métayer has also worked at the hotel.
