= Majestic Hotel =

Majestic Hotel or Hotel Majestic may refer to:

== England ==
- Majestic Hotel, Barrow-in-Furness, Cumbria
- Majestic Hotel, Harrogate, North Yorkshire

== France ==
- Hotel Majestic (Cannes)
- Majestic Hôtel-Spa, a hotel in Paris
- The Peninsula Paris, originally the Hotel Majestic

== Malaysia ==
- Hotel Majestic (Kuala Lumpur)

== Mexico ==
- Hotel Majestic (Mexico City)

== Spain ==
- Hotel Majestic (Barcelona)

== Tunisia ==
- Hotel Majestic (Tunis)

== United States ==
- Majestic Hotel (Atlanta)
- Hotel Majestic (Manhattan) (1894–1929), today The Majestic (apartment building)
- Majestic Hotel (St. Louis, Missouri)
- Hotel Majestic (San Francisco)

== Vietnam ==
- Hotel Majestic (Saigon)

== Other uses ==
- Hotel Majestic (TV series), a 2015 Nigerian telenovela
- "Hotel Majestic", the 11th track on the album Traffic and Weather by Fountains of Wayne

== See also ==
- Maigret and the Hotel Majestic, a detective novel
- Majestic Building (disambiguation)
