= Majesty (disambiguation) =

Majesty is a prefix for something that (notionally) belongs to the monarch, as in HM Ship or HMS (His/Her Majesty's ship), HM Government, etc.

Majesty may also refer to:

== Vehicles and transportation ==
- Norwegian Majesty, a ship in Norwegian Cruise Lines
- Toyota Majesty, a minivan vehicle sold in Thailand

== Video games ==
- Majesty: The Fantasy Kingdom Sim, a real-time strategy computer game developed by Cyberlore Studios in 2000 and first published by MicroProse
- Majesty: The Northern Expansion, an expansion pack for the 2000 RTS game Majesty: The Fantasy Kingdom Sim, by Cyberlore
- Majesty 2: The Fantasy Kingdom Sim, a 2009 sequel to the above produced by Paradox Interactive

== Music ==
=== Albums ===
- Majesty (album), by Ron Kenoly
- Majesty, a live DVD from band The Black Dahlia Murder

=== Artists ===
- Majesty (band), a German heavy metal band
- Majesty, a band formed in 1985 by John Petrucci, John Myung, Mike Portnoy, Kevin Moore, and Chris Collins, which later became known as Dream Theater
- Majesty, a rapper from the Queens borough of the city of New York, and member of hip hop group Live Squad

=== Songs ===
- "Majesty" (song), a 2018 song by Nicki Minaj, Labrinth and Eminem
- "Majesty", a song by Blind Guardian from the album Battalions of Fear, 1988
- "Majesty", a song by Bury Tomorrow from the album The Seventh Sun, 2023
- "Majesty", a song by Ghost from the album Meliora, 2015
- "Majesty", a song by Madrugada from the album Grit, 2002
- "Majesty", a 1978 hymn by Dr. Jack W. Hayford
- "Majesty (Here I Am)", a song by Delirious? from the album World Service, 2003
- "Majesty", a 2018 song by Apashe and Wasiu

== Other uses ==
- Christ in Majesty

== See also ==
- Imperial and Royal Majesty (style) HI&RM
- Majestic (disambiguation)
- Her Majesty (disambiguation)
- His Majesty (disambiguation)
