= Le Canto (album) =

Studio album by Kari Jobe
- Released: April 28, 2009
- Recorded: 2008
- Genre: Worship; Latin Christian music
- Length: 55:46
- Label: Integrity Media, Columbia, Gateway Create
- Producer: Ed Cash

Kari Jobe chronology
Kari Jobe (2009)	Le Canto (2009)	Where I Find You (2012)

Kari Jobe in Spanish chronology
Le Canto (2009)	Donde Te Encuentro (2012)

Singles from Le Canto
- 1. "Le Canto" Released: November 24, 2008; 2. "Me Sanaste" Released: 2009

Le Canto (English: I'm Singing) is the first Spanish language album by Kari Jobe. It is the Spanish version of Kari Jobe, but features two songs not included on the English version of the album. Le Canto was released on April 28, 2009. Le Canto won a Dove Award in the category Spanish Album of the Year at the 41st GMA Dove Awards.

== Critical reception ==
Professional ratings
Review scores
Source	Rating
AllMusic	3/5 stars

Andree Farias from AllMusic said, "If one didn't know a word of Spanish, Kari Jobe's Le Canto would sound exactly like what it is: the Spanish-language version of her wildly popular self-titled debut." He described the translations as "often clunky, verbatim renditions", but that "at least she sings the heck out of the songs; the purity and conviction in her voice remain her strongest suit".

== Track listing ==
Note: These songs are Spanish-language translations of Kari Jobe songs in English. The original English-language song is listed next to each title.

No.	Title	Length
1.	"Le Canto" ("I'm Singing")	3:43
2.	"Me Sanaste" ("Healer")	5:03
3.	"Gozándome" ("Joyfully")	4:01
4.	"Bello" ("Beautiful")	6:21
5.	"Espera" ("Be Still")	3:24
6.	"Nunca Paras de Cantar" ("Singing over Me")	3:57
7.	"No Hay Otro Nombre" ("No Sweeter Name")	4:16
8.	"Tu Bondad" ("You Are Good")	4:27
9.	"Levántame en Amor" ("Sweep Me Away")	5:00
10.	"Digno y Santo" ("Revelation Song")	6:00
11.	"Tú Eres para Mí" ("You Are for Me")	4:31
12.	"Tengo Paz en Mi Ser" ("It Is Well")	4:51
Total length:		55:46

== Awards ==
On February 18, 2010, Le Canto was nominated for a Dove Award for Spanish Language Album of the Year at the 41st GMA Dove Awards, which it won.
