= Her Majesty =

Her Majesty may refer to:

- Majesty, a style used by monarchs and wives of kings
- "Her Majesty" (song), a 1969 song by the Beatles about Queen Elizabeth II
- Her Majesty the Decemberists, an album from The Decemberists
- Her Majesty (2001 film), a New Zealand film about a young girl, her Maori friend and the visit of the young Queen Elizabeth II in New Zealand
- Her Majesty (1922 film), an American silent comedy film
- Su majestad, a 2025 Spanish comedy TV series about a fictional Spanish princess stepping in for her father, the king

== See also ==
- His Majesty (disambiguation)
- Majesty (disambiguation)
- Majestic (disambiguation)
