= Les Hôtels Baverez =

French luxury hotel group

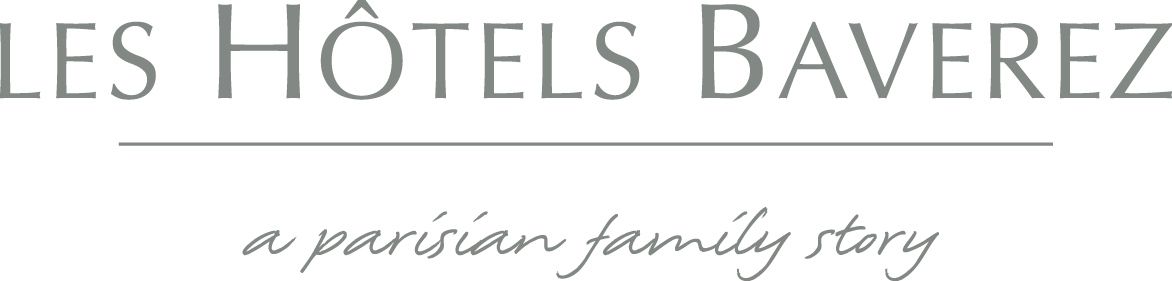
- Type: Public
- Traded as: Euronext Growth
- Industry: Hospitality
- Founded: 1900; 126 years ago in Paris, France
- Founders: Léonard Tauber; Constant Baverez
- Headquarters: Paris, France
- Key people: Françoise Baverez (Chair); Véronique Valcke (Executive Director)
- Subsidiaries: Hôtel Raphael; Hôtel Regina; Majestic Hôtel-Spa
- Website: leshotelsbaverez.com

Les Hôtels Baverez is a French luxury hotel group established by the Baverez family in 1900.

The company owns and operates three historic five-star properties in Paris: Hôtel Régina Louvre, Hôtel Raphael, and Majestic Hôtel-Spa.

== History ==
Since its founding in 1900, Les Hôtels Baverez has been managed by the Baverez family. The company operates three five-star hotels in Paris: Hôtel Regina (opened 1900), Hôtel Majestic (1908), and Hôtel Raphael (1925). It was established by Constant Baverez and Léonard Tauber.

Paul Baverez succeeded his father Constant, and Paul’s daughter Françoise Beauvais (born Baverez) currently serves as chair of the board of directors as of June 2025. Françoise’s daughter Véronique Valcke was executive director from 2010 to 2013.

In 2014, Françoise Beauvais was made a chevalier of the French Legion of Honour.

== Hôtel Regina ==
Inaugurated in 1900 for the Exposition Universelle in Paris, Hôtel Regina is located on the Place des Pyramides. The hotel occupies a Second Empire–style building designed by Léonard Tauber and Constant Baverez between 1898 and 1900. It was named in honor of Queen Victoria to symbolize the Entente Cordiale between France and Britain.

The hotel underwent a series of renovations in 2013, with a total cost of €17 million. These renovations included extensive restoration work. As a result, Atout France awarded the hotel its fifth star in 2015. The hotel also replaced its revolving door in 2016 and added a wellness center, including a spa, hammam, and gym, in 2018.

== Majestic Hôtel-Spa ==
The Majestic Hôtel-Spa is located at 30 rue La Pérouse in the 16th arrondissement of Paris. The original Hôtel Majestic was built by Léonard Tauber and opened in 1908 as the second hotel of what is now the Baverez group. It was situated on the opposite side of rue La Perouse in the building now known as The Peninsula Paris Hotel. That building was purchased by the French government in 1936 to serve as offices for the Ministry of War.

The 30 rue La Pérouse building opened in February 2010 as Hôtel Majestic Villa. Later, the name was changed to Majestic Hôtel-Spa.

== Hôtel Raphaël ==
Hôtel Raphael is a 5-star hotel in the 16th arrondissement of Paris. It was built in 1925 by Léonard Tauber and Constant Baverez, based on the plans of architect André Rousselot. The hotel features Art-Deco-style decorations and was named after the painter Raphael.

Hollywood actors such as Ava Gardner, Katharine Hepburn, Charles Bronson, Yul Brynner, Henry Fonda, Clark Gable, Grace Kelly, Burt Lancaster, Steve McQueen, Roger Moore, Kirk Douglas, Gary Cooper, and Marlon Brando were regular guests. During the German occupation of Paris, the hotel was the principal billet for senior officers of the SS, Gestapo, and Wehrmacht. The German author Ernst Jünger was a resident at the Raphael and wrote many of the entries for his war journals within its confines.
