= Mount Majestic =

Mount Majestic may refer to:

- Mount Majestic (Victoria), a mountain in Victoria, Australia
- Mount Majestic (Utah), a mountain in Zion National Park in southwestern Utah, United States
- Clayton Peak, a mountain on Guardsman Pass in northern Utah, United States, that is also sometimes known as Mount Majestic
