= His Majesty =

His Majesty may refer to:

- Majesty, a style used by monarchs
- His Majesty (comic opera), an 1897 English comic opera
- His Majesty (band)
- His Majesty (horse) (1968–1995), American Thoroughbred racehorse
- London, Brighton and South Coast Railway no. 42 His Majesty, an LB&SCR B4 class 4-4-0 tender locomotive

== See also ==
- Majesty (disambiguation)
- Her Majesty (disambiguation)
- His Imperial Majesty
