= Where I Find You =

Studio album by Kari Jobe
- Released: January 24, 2012
- Genre: Contemporary Christian music, worship
- Length: 54:26
- Label: Sparrow
- Producer: Matt Bronleewe: Ed Cash

Kari Jobe chronology
Le Canto (2009)	Where I Find You (2012)	Donde Te Encuentro (2012)

Singles from Where I Find You
- 1. "We Are" Released: October 14, 2011

Where I Find You is the second studio album release by Kari Jobe, which was released January 24, 2012, but was her first album on the Sparrow Records label. The song "We Are" is the only radio and charted hit off of the album, so far. The album has charted on three Billboard charts: No. 10 on Billboard 200, No. 1 on Christian Albums and at No. 5 on Digital Albums. All of the peak positions occurred on February 11, 2012, selling 25,000 copies in the first week. Where I Find You earned a Grammy Award nomination in 2012, making Jobe a first-time Grammy nominee.

== Background ==
Album

Jobe said "I felt the first record needed to be peaceful and more acoustic sounding in order to help people connect with God through it. This time around, I really wanted it to be a bigger sound and more driving in the music...the songs actually require a stronger drum and musical presence to support the lyrics."

We Are

The song "We Are", Jobe stated that "this song comes out of Matthew 5 where Jesus says, 'You are the light of the world. A city on a hill that CANNOT be hidden...It's Jesus that shines through us. I don't have to shine or be good at it; Jesus is good at what He does and when we're surrendered to Him, we will minister to people around us...I think sometimes we feel the Lord asking us to step outside of our own comfort zone and minister to someone, or share a word of encouragement with them. This is always fun and adventurous and so life-giving to you and the person receiving ministry. The Lord just wants to work through us and use us to minister."

== Reception ==
=== Critical ===
Professional ratings
Review scores
Source	Rating
All About Worship (Chris Olsen & Julie Terwilliger)	4.5/5 stars
CCM Magazine (Grace S. Aspinwall)	4/5 stars
Christian Broadcasting Network (Craig von Buseck)	4/5 stars
Christian Manifesto (Lydia Akinola)	3/5 stars
Christian Music Zine (Joshua Andre)	4.5/5 stars
Christianity Today (Andrew Greer)	3/5 stars
Cross Rhythms (Tim Holden)	9/10 stars
Indie Vision Music (Jonathan Andre)	4/5 stars
Jesus Freak Hideout (Jen Rose)	3.5/5 stars
Louder Than The Music (Jono Davies)	4/5 stars
New Release Tuesday (Sarah Fine)	4.5/5 stars

Allmusic's Matt Collar said "Where I Find You, features more of the inspirational artist's melodic Christian pop." In addition, Collar wrote that "this is bright, positive-minded, and uplifting modern CCM." Collar cited the songs of "Steady My Heart", "We Are" and "Savior's Here" as his top picks selections.

All About Worship's Chris Olsen said he has "genuinely been moved almost to the point of tears". Julie Terwilliger wrote she "definitely noticed how polished it sounded at first. Although pretty much all of the songs are congregational friendly they are also masterfully produced for a radio hit. A few creative new sounds incorporated, but not to the point that the art is more noticeable than the heart of worship expressed." Olsen highlighted "Here" as his favorite track, while Terwilliger reported hers' as "Find You on My Knees" and "Stars in the Sky".

Alpha Omega New's Rob Snyder graded the album an A, and said "the very real lyrics often have a reoccurring theme in that God is around even when 'it all just falls apart' (Steady My Heart)."

CCM Magazine's Grace S. Aspinwall said "all at once moving, strong and wistful, this project is breathtaking. Kari Jobe has only gotten better since her beautiful debut, and every single song on this album is incredible." Aspinwall wrote that "every single song is a winner here and we could listen all day long." They highlighted the track "One Desire" as the "WE LIKE" pick.

Christian Broadcasting Network's Craig von Buseck said "this is much more of a pop album than a traditional worship or 'soaking' album, though it is still very 'worshipful' as seen in songs such as 'Love Came Down'" von Buseck wrote "the orchestration in this album is a nice balance of lush instrumentation and straightforward pop". von Buseck noted that Jobe had a distinct voice, when he heard the album.

Christian Manifesto's Lydia Akinola said that "however, I feel that in an effort to appeal to an even wider audience, in a push for a more poppy and accessibly sound, some of the aesthetic purity that made Jobe's debut so successful has been sacrificed. The strongest points of Where I Find You are those which have developed what worked from the first project and taken it further. The closer "Here" is one such song." Akinola wrote that "nevertheless, Where I Find You is not without its bright spots. Jobe collaborated with Matt Maher performing a beautiful duet on "We Exalt Your Name" and also worked with fellow Dove winner Chris August on "Stars in the Sky". "Find You on My Knees" is a standout track full of all the passion that Kari Jobe is famous for."

Christian Music Zine's Joshua Andre said "all in all Kari is as emotional, honest and powerful, or maybe even more so, in this album, as any other worship album in the past five years. This album touched me so much emotionally and spiritually. Kari is an excellent songwriter, and she sticks to a certain style in her album; this is what I believe sets her apart from some other worship artists. She knows her strengths and sings to it." Andre wrote that the "album is near flawless". Andre highlights the favorite tracks as being "We Are", "Savior's Here", "Stars in the Sky", "Rise", "One Desire", and "Run to You".

Christianity Today's Andrew Greer said "Where I Find You raises the bar, expanding her worship sensibility and solo pop sweetness by enlisting major hooks to showcase radio-ready co-writes (with the likes of Matt Maher, Lincoln Brewster and Hillsong's Mia Feldes)." Greer wrote that "despite some sleepy clichés, Jobe's sensitive evocations make apparent her genuine worship music background." The top tracks according to Greer was "Steady My Heart," "We Are," "Find You on My Knees".

Cross Rhythms' Tim Holden said that "If you like uplifting pop done well, go get this album."

Indie Vision Music's Jonathan Andre said "the result of this realisation is 12 songs of raw passion, honesty and devotion to the God of the universe. With such moving and emotional lyrical content, Kari is able to allow the listener to encounter and experience the Lord's promises and truths upon their life, praising and exalting Him in the process." Andre wrote that "with the rise of many worship artists like Chris Tomlin, Christy Nockels, Meredith Andrews, Matt Maher, and Martin Smith; Kari Jobe stands tall with each of these musically diverse artists, with her soaring vocals and vulnerability serving as a strength in this album, about pure adoration, wonder and marvel towards the King who has won her heart. Her enthusiasm and infectious vocal ability in her songs has taken the listener, me included, on a spiritual journey like no other. This album is certainly to savour".

Jesus Freak Hideout's Jen Rose said that "Where I Find You plunges straight into the arena-filling sound of artists like Chris Tomlin and Hillsong. Piano and keys still figure greatly into her work, with guitars, strings, and big drums to amplify the emotion. Lyrically, these tracks showcase singable hooks that stick in the mind and cover a variety of themes, from looking to God in adversity and the role of the Church, to proclamations of God's holiness, mercy, and unchanging nature. A few songs take on a personal angle, but these too keep the focus vertical and the mood reverent." Rose wrote that "Overall, this is a well made, passionately delivered project and is sure to provide a few new additions to many a church leader's songbook. Still, it's worth noting that some of these songs, like the staples of most worship albums, are meant for the live experience. With the exception of a few tracks, the bulk of the record carries a highly produced 'worship sound,' and some of the bigger, longer tracks can get repetitious after a while. This is the dilemma pointed out by many critics of the genre, and it's a bit disappointing to have that 'heard it before' feeling, especially considering the beauty of her more restrained pieces or the fun of her pop radio single." Lastly, Rose said the "standout moments" are tracks "Steady My Heart" and "Find You on My Knees".

Louder Than The Music's Jono Davies said "The only negative point that I can bring out about this album is that some of tracks can seem to take the same pattern of style. When you know there is going to be a big chorus and even bigger bridge section then some songs can seem familiar in style. But even taking that small negative point into account this album has some extraordinary, strong and excellent tracks. One of the reasons you buy an album like this is because you want to hear the strong vocals of Kari Jobe and for me they have become even stronger, richer and much more delightful to listen to. Kari Jobe has made an amazing jump in quality and Where I Find You proves it." Davies noted the "standout tracks" as being "What Love Is This", "Steady My Heart" and "We Exalt Your Name".

New Release Tuesday's Sarah Fine said "Where I Find You has been well worth the wait for Kari Jobe fans. Intensely passionate and honest, this has taken Kari's artistry and elevated it to a whole new level. This is a deeper project than her 2009 debut, many of the songs coming from an openly broken place, but it's the promise of hope in the midst of that brokenness, that turns each song into a beautiful anthem of unwavering praise. Musically, while her debut hung heavily on a quirky organic sound, this effort sounds much more studio polished and matured. Some people might miss that eccentric earthiness, but regardless, it's hard not to enjoy the smooth and stirring melodies found on this project, especially when they each hold such a profound meaning."

=== Commercial ===
The album sold 25,000 copies in the first week, and this helped it achieve the spots on the 200, Christian and Digital albums charts for the week of February 11, 2012.

== Track listing ==
No.	Title	Writer(s)	Producer(s)	Length
1.	"Steady My Heart"	Kari Jobe, Ben Glover, Matt Bronleewe	Bronleewe	3:37
2.	"We Are"	Ed Cash, Chuck Butler, James Tealy, Hillary McBride	Cash	3:43
3.	"One Desire"	Jobe, Jason Ingram	Cash	5:26
4.	"Find You on My Knees"	Jobe, Glover, Bronleewe	Bronleewe	3:17
5.	"Savior's Here"	Jobe, Cody Carnes	Cash	5:44
6.	"Stars in the Sky"	Jobe, Chris August	Bronleewe	3:39
7.	"What Love Is This"	Jobe, Mia Fieldes, Lincoln Brewster	Cash	4:29
8.	"Run to You (I Need You)"	Jobe, Cash, Matt Burrowes, Tim Peters, Janell Belcher, Jason Belcher, Jordan Mackenzie	Cash	4:11
9.	"Rise"	Jobe, Bronleewe	Bronleewe	4:18
10.	"Love Came Down"	Jeremy Riddle, Jeremy Edwardson, Ian McIntosh, Brian Johnson	Cash	4:53
11.	"We Exalt Your Name" (featuring Matt Maher)	Jobe, Maher	Cash	5:28
12.	"Here"	Jobe, David Leonard, Leslie Jordan	Cash	5:41
Total length:				54:26

== Personnel ==
- Kari Jobe – lead and backing vocals
- Matt Stanfield – programming (1, 4, 6, 9), acoustic piano (12)
- Chuck Butler – keyboards (2), programming (2), loops (2)
- Tim Lauer – keyboards (2, 3, 5, 8, 10–12)
- Ed Cash – keyboards (2), programming (2, 3, 5, 7, 8, 10, 11), acoustic guitar (2, 3, 5, 8, 10, 11), backing vocals (2, 3, 5, 8, 10), additional keyboards (12)
- Ben Shive – acoustic piano (3)
- Jeff Roach – acoustic piano (7)
- Grant Pittman – keyboards (11)
- Matt Bronleewe – guitars (1, 4, 6, 9), various random additional and supplemental sonic material (1, 4, 6, 9)
- Stephen Leiweke – guitars (1, 4, 6, 9)
- Stu G – electric guitar (2, 3, 5, 8, 10, 11)
- Chris Lacorte – electric guitar (2, 5)
- Jerry McPherson – electric guitar (2, 3, 8)
- Adam Shoenfeld – electric guitar (2, 3, 5, 8, 10)
- Hank Bentley – electric guitar (11)
- James Gregory – bass (1, 4, 6, 9)
- Tony Lucido – bass (2, 3, 5, 8, 10, 11, 12)
- Paul Mabury – drums (1–6, 8–12)
- Trent Austin – drums (11)
- Chris Carmichael – strings (1, 4, 6, 9), string arrangements (1, 4, 6, 9)
- Frances Cash – backing vocals (2)
- Cody Carnes – harmony vocals (5)
- Ryan Edgar – harmony vocals (10)
- Matt Maher – harmony vocals (11)

Technical credits

- Stephen Leiweke – engineer (1, 4, 6, 9)
- Ed Cash – engineer (2, 3, 5, 7, 8, 10–12), mixing (7)
- Aaron Michael Brown – additional engineer
- Steve Rokks – additional engineer
- Scott Cash – assistant engineer (2, 3, 5, 7, 8, 10–12)
- Cody Norris – assistant engineer (2, 3, 5, 7, 8, 10–12)
- F. Reid Shippen – mixing (1–6, 8–12)
- Erik "Keller" Jahner – mix assistant (1–6, 8–12)
- John DeNosky – editing (1, 4, 6, 9)
- Ted Jensen – mastering at Sterling Sound (New York, NY)

Production credits

- Karrie Hardwick – A&R
- Jess Chambers – A&R administration
- Lani Crump – production coordinator (1, 4, 6, 9)
- Dave Steunebrink – production coordinator (1, 4, 6, 9)
- Jan Cook – art direction
- Kari Jobe – art direction
- Alena Moore – art direction
- Sean Mosher-Smith – design
- Jessica Sheppard – back and cover photography
- Reid Rolls – inside photography
- Kristen Pate – additional insert photos
- Anna Redmon – additional insert photos
- Juliana Parrish – hair (cover)
- Chelsie Birks – make-up (cover)
- Kris Laymon – stylist (cover)

== Charts ==
=== Album ===
Chart (2012)	Peak position
UK Christian & Gospel Albums (OCC)	11
US Billboard 200	10
US Top Christian Albums (Billboard)	1
US Digital Albums (Billboard)	5

=== Singles ===
Year	Single	Peak chart positions
Year	Single	US Hot Christian Songs
2011	"We Are"	8
