= Kari Jobe (album) =

Studio album by Kari Jobe
- Released: February 10, 2009
- Recorded: 2008
- Genre: Contemporary worship
- Length: 53:42
- Label: Integrity Media, Gateway Create Publishing
- Producer: Ed Cash

Kari Jobe chronology
Bethlehem (2007)	Kari Jobe (2009)	Le Canto (2009)

Singles from Kari Jobe
- 1. "I'm Singing" Released: November 24, 2008; 2. "Healer" Released: 2009

Professional ratings
Review scores
Source	Rating
AllMusic	3.5/5 stars

Kari Jobe is the debut album by Christian music singer Kari Jobe. The album was released on February 10, 2009 by Integrity Media and Gateway Create Publishing. The album reached No. 67 on the Billboard 200, and No. 3 on the Billboard Christian music chart. Featured on the album are Jobe's first singles, "I'm Singing" and "Healer". "I'm Singing" debuted at No. 13 on the Billboard Christian music charts and "Healer" debuted at No. 33 on the Billboard Soft A/C chart. Alongside the original album, Jobe released Le Canto, a Spanish language version of the album. Le Canto won a Dove Award in 2010 for Best Spanish Language Album of the Year.

== Track listing ==
No.	Title	Writer(s)	Length
1.	"I'm Singing"	Kari Jobe, Ed Cash, Chris Tomlin	3:47
2.	"Healer"	Mike Guglielmucci	5:06
3.	"Everyone Needs a Little"	Jobe, Cash, Tomlin	3:36
4.	"Joyfully"	Jobe, Cash, Mia Fieldes	4:00
5.	"Beautiful"	Jobe, Paul Baloche, Fieldes	6:20
6.	"My Beloved"	Jobe, Klaus Kuehn	3:44
7.	"Singing Over Me"	Jobe, Cash, Fieldes	3:57
8.	"No Sweeter Name"	Jobe	4:18
9.	"Be Still"	Jobe, Cash	3:22
10.	"Sweep Me Away"	Jobe	5:00
11.	"Revelation Song"	Jennie Lee Riddle	5:59
12.	"You Are for Me"	Jobe	4:33
Total length:			53:42

== Personnel ==
- Kari Jobe – lead vocals, backing vocals (1, 4, 5, 7, 10)
- Jason Webb – keyboards (1, 2, 5–8, 11)
- Matt Gilder – keyboards (3, 4)
- Jeff Roach – keyboards (7, 10, 12)
- Ed Cash – acoustic guitar (1–5, 8–11), electric guitar (1–5, 7, 8, 11), backing vocals (1, 4, 8, 11), mandolin (3, 8), harmony vocals (3), programming (4, 5, 8)
- Paul Moak – electric guitar (1–8, 10–12)
- Matt Pierson – bass (1–4, 9, 10)
- Chris Donohue – bass (5–8, 11, 12)
- Josh Robinson – drums (1–4, 9, 10, 12)
- Steve Brewster – drums (5–8, 11)
- Caleb Jobe – percussion (8)
- David Davidson – violin (1, 2, 12)
- John Catchings – cello (6, 9)
- Dick Hensold – Northumbrian pipes (11)
- Frances Cash – backing vocals (3)
- Ryan Edgar – harmony vocals (6, 10), backing vocals (8)

== Production ==
- Thomas Miller – executive producer, art direction
- Ed Cash – producer, engineer, mixing (4–6, 8–12)
- Paul Moak – engineer
- Matt Armstrong – assistant engineer
- F. Reid Shippen – mixing (1–3, 7)
- Buckley Miller – mix assistant (1–3, 7)
- Bob Ludwig – mastering at Gateway Mastering (Portland, Maine)
- Craig Dunnagan – A&R
- Jay King – A&R
- Anita Fulkerson – production manager
- Kari Jobe – art direction
- Alena Moore – art direction
- Sam Noerr – art direction
- Gary Dorsey – design
- Eric Ryan Anderson – cover photography
- Jessica Sheppard – inside photography
- Grant Jenkins – management
- Steve Rice – song development

== Charts ==
Chart (2009–2011)	Peak position
US Billboard 200	63
US Top Catalog Albums (Billboard)	1
US Christian Albums (Billboard)	3
US Current Album Sales (Billboard)	67
