= Donde Te Encuentro =

Studio album by Kari Jobe
- Released: April 24, 2012
- Studio: Brilliant Recording Studios; Ed's, Franklin, TN; My Town Studios; Yackland Studios, Nashville, TN
- Genre: Worship; Latin Christian music
- Length: 54:05
- Label: Sparrow; EMI CMG
- Producer: Matt Bronleewe, Ed Cash

Kari Jobe chronology
Where I Find You (2012)	Donde Te Encuentro (2012)	Majestic (2014)

Kari Jobe in Spanish chronology
Le Canto (2009)	Donde Te Encuentro (2012)

Donde Te Encuentro is Kari Jobe's second Spanish language album. Donde Te Encuentro is the Spanish version of the album Where I Find You released on January 24, 2012. This album was released on April 24, 2012, by Sparrow Records label. The album debuted at chart No. 6 on the Latin Pop Albums and on the chart No. 19 on the Top Latin Albums by Billboard.

== Critical reception ==
Professional ratings
Review scores
Source	Rating
AllMusic	3/5 stars
Amazon.com	positive

Awarding the album with three stars out of five, Andree Farias from Allmusic's said "Jobe herself enunciates properly and sings with pathos, doing justice to songs that sound wonderful if one's first language isn't español, but that otherwise may raise eyebrows among hardcore Latin gospel listeners." A staff editor at Amazon.com gave the album a relatively positive review, writing, "Donde Te Encuentro (Where I Find You) features all 12 powerful songs from Where I Find You recorded entirely in Spanish including the current hit radio single, We Are, that Kari describes as a song of commission for us as believers to be reminded of what we ve been called to and that is to impact people s lives in everything we do."

== Track listing ==
NOTE: These songs are Spanish-language translations of Kari Jobe songs in English. The original English-language song is listed next to each title.

No.	Title	Writer(s)	Producer(s)	Length
1.	"A Mi Corazón Tranquilizarás (Steady My Heart)"	Kari Jobe, Ben Glover, Matt Bronleewe	Bronleewe	3:34
2.	"Somos la Luz (We Are)"	Ed Cash, Chuck Butler, James Tealy, Hillary McBride	Cash	3:42
3.	"Mi Mayor Pasión (One Desire)"	Jobe, Jason Ingram	Cash	5:26
4.	"Vuelvo a Tus Pies (Find You on My Knees)"	Jobe, Glover, Bronleewe	Bronleewe	3:16
5.	"Mi Salvador (Savior's Here)"	Jobe, Cody Carnes	Cash	5:44
6.	"Cada Estrella (Stars in the Sky)"	Jobe, Chris August	Bronleewe	3:32
7.	"Que Bello Amor (What Love Is This)"	Jobe, Mia Fieldes, Lincoln Brewster	Cash	4:29
8.	"A Tí Correré (Run to You - I Need You)"	Jobe, Cash, Matt Burrowes, Tim Peters, Janell Belcher, Jason Belcher, Jordan Mackenzie	Cash	4:11
9.	"Nos Levantaremos (Rise)"	Jobe, Bronleewe	Bronleewe	4:18
10.	"Tu Amor Vino a Mi (Love Came Down)"	Jeremy Riddle, Jeremy Edwardson, Ian McIntosh, Brian Johnson	Cash	4:54
11.	"Tu Nombre Exaltaré (We Exalt Your Name)" (featuring Matt Maher)	Jobe, Maher	Cash	5:25
12.	"Aquí Está (Here)"	Jobe, David Leonard, Leslie Jordan	Cash	5:34
Total length:				54:05

== Chart performance ==
Chart (2012)	Peak position
US Latin Pop Albums (Billboard)	6
US Top Latin Albums (Billboard)	19
