= Majestic Building =

Majestic Building may refer to:

== United States ==
- Majestic Building (Indianapolis, Indiana)
- Majestic Building (Detroit)
- Majestic Manufacturing Company Buildings, St. Louis, Missouri, listed on the NRHP in St. Louis, Missouri
- The Majestic (apartment building), a housing cooperative at 115 Central Park West in New York City

== Elsewhere ==
- Majestic Building (Bucaramanga, Colombia), one of the taller buildings in South America
- Majestic Centre, Wellington, New Zealand
- The Majestic, Singapore, a building in Singapore
- Majestic, Leeds, UK, a Grade II listed building

== See also ==
- Majestic Hotel (disambiguation)
- Majestic Theatre (disambiguation)
