= Hôtel Régina =

Hotel in Paris, France

Hôtel Regina
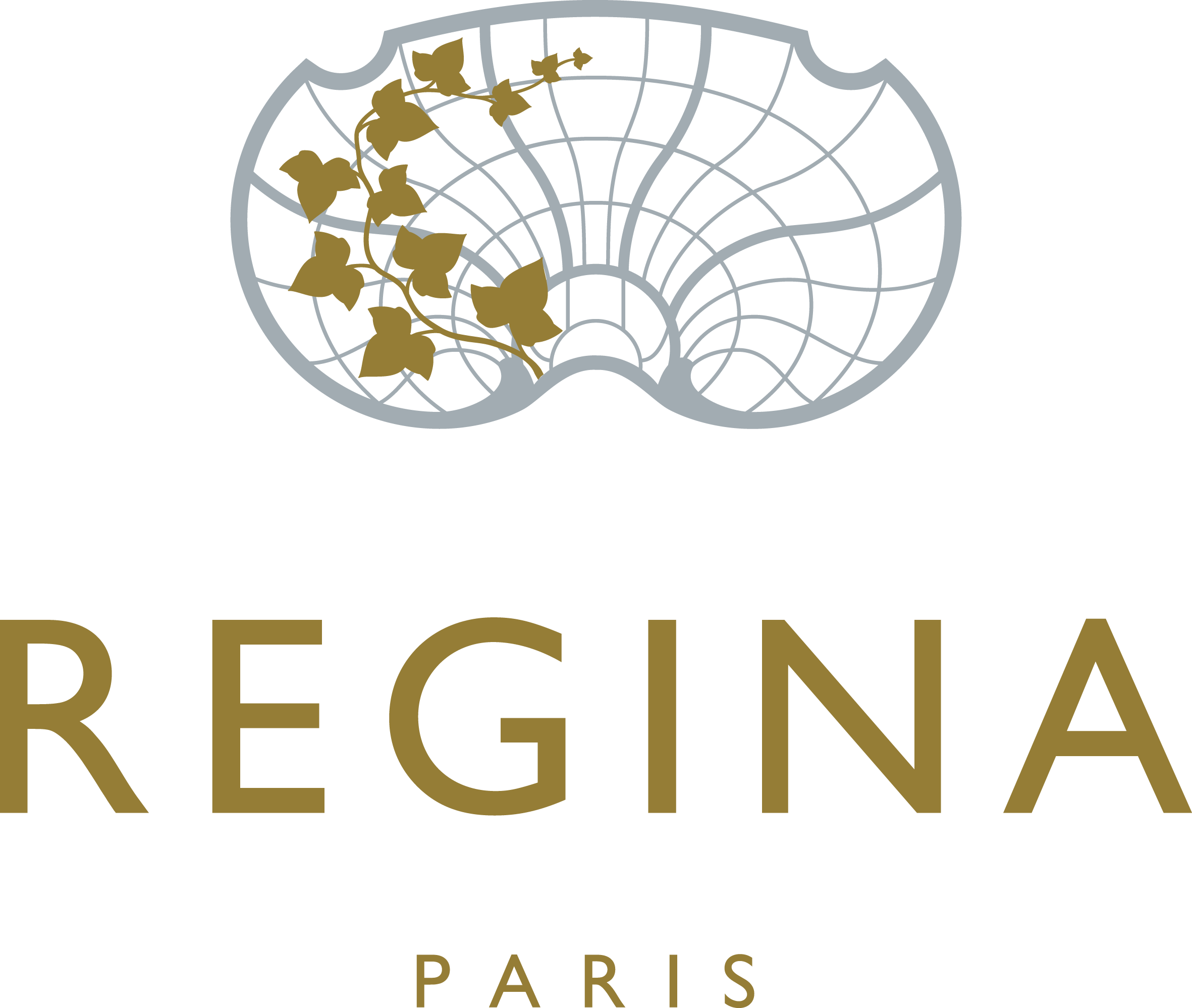

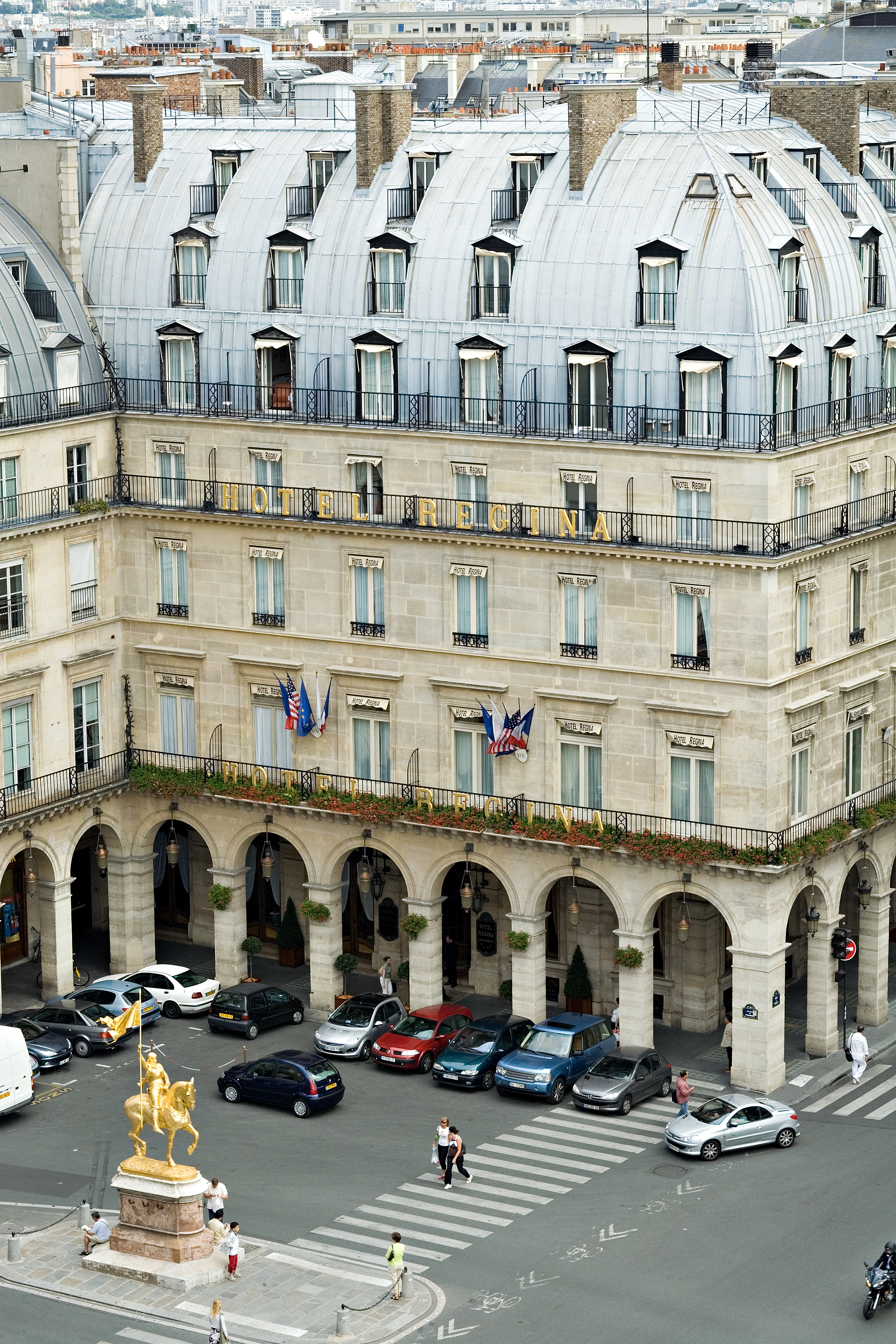

General information
- Location: 2 Place des Pyramides, 1st arrondissement, Paris
- Coordinates: 48°51′49″N 2°19′55″E
- Opened: 1900
- Operator: Les Hôtels Baverez

Technical details
- Floor count: 6

Other information
- Number of rooms: 99
- Number of restaurants: 3

Website
- www.regina-hotel.com

The Hôtel Regina (French: [otɛl ʁeʒina]) is a grand hotel in Paris which opened in 1900. It is on the Place des Pyramides, across the Rue de Rivoli from the Jardin des Tuileries and an entrance to the Louvre. In the square in front of it is a gilded statue of Joan of Arc on horseback.

== History ==
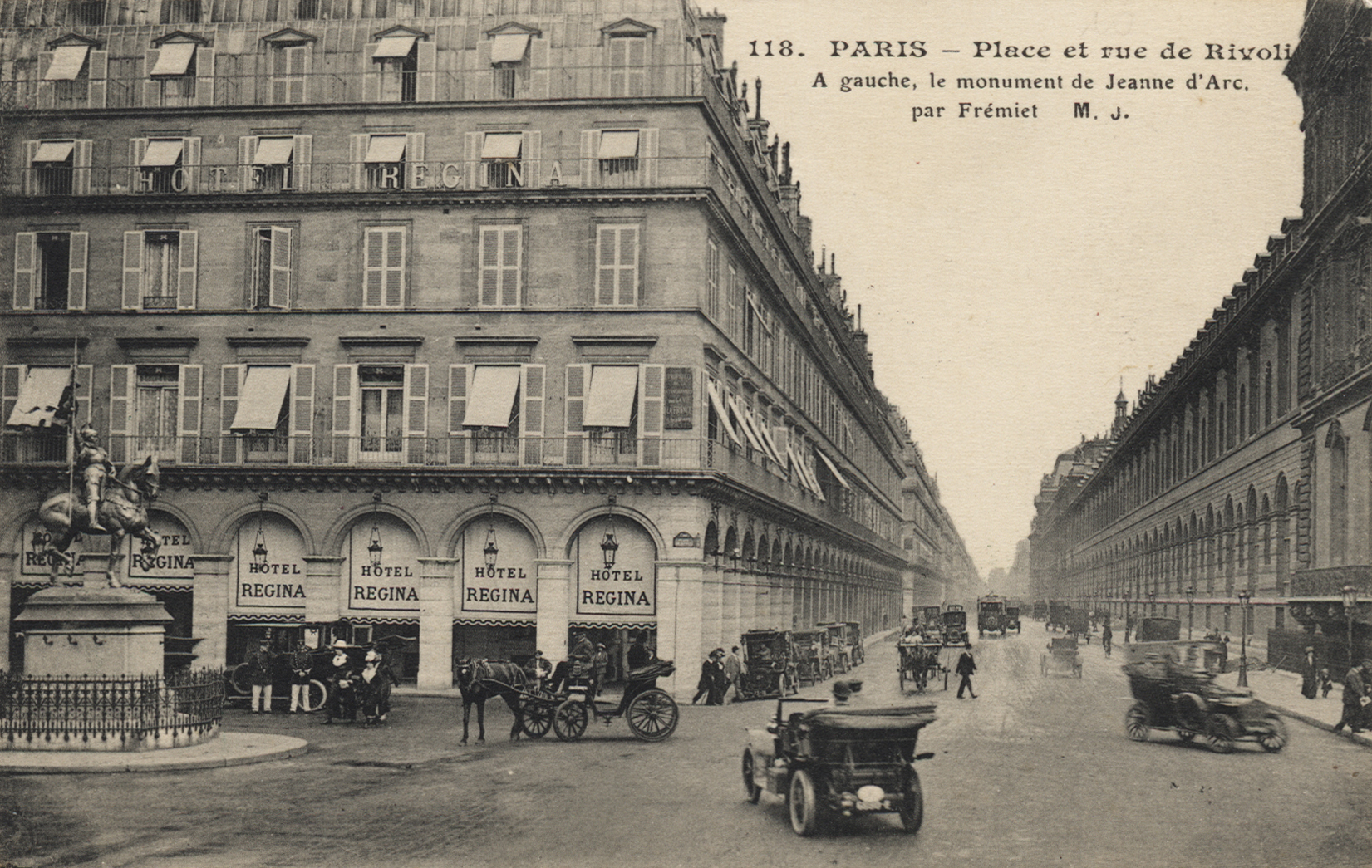
The hotel in the early 20th century

Hotel Regina debuted in 1900 for the World's Fair in Paris. The hotel, located on the Place des Pyramides, takes its name from Napoleon's victory in Egypt in 1798. The hotel's building dates from the Second Empire. Léonard Tauber and his associate Constant Baverez built it between 1898 and 1900. It was named after Queen Victoria, symbolising the Entente Cordiale between the French and the British.

The first phase of the hotel's renovation was completed in summer 2014. Renovation of the second wing, begun in October 2014, was inaugurated on 29 September 2015. The renovations' estimated cost is 17 million euros. In November 2014, Piazzi was appointed as the new director, and in August 2015, the hotel received its fifth star from the Atout France agency.

The hotel is owned by Les Hôtels Baverez. The group, founded by Léonard Tauber, is currently run by Françoise Baverez and her daughter Véronique Valcke, descendants of Tauber's associate Constant Bavarez.

== Property ==
The hotel is a five-star hotel with 98 bedrooms. Some rooms have views on the Jardin des Tuileries or the Louvre.

== Restaurants ==
- The hotel chose Ladurée for its pastries.
- The Lounge Club: located under the Arcades, facing the Louvre Museum.
- Bar Anglais and its terrace: a location reminiscent of Victorian England.
- La Terrasse Cour Jardin: a furnished and flowery interior terrace.
- Tea Room: facing the Louvre Museum, it offers a selection of teas, chocolates, and pastries.

== Filmography ==
Numerous films have been filmed at the hotel since 1980:

- 1980: The Lady Banker
- 1984: The Blood of Others
- 1984: L'Amour en héritage
- 1986: The Joint Brothers
- 1990: La Femme Nikita
- 1997: Same Old Song
- 1998: Man Is a Woman
- 2001: Kiss of the Dragon
- 2002: The Bourne Identity
- 2005: Incontrôlable
- 2007: Sagan
- 2008: Female Agents
- 2009: The Extraordinary Adventures of Adèle Blanc-Sec
- 2009: "Cheri"
- 2011: Upgrade
- 2013: RED 2
