= Kari Jobe =

American contemporary Christian music artist (born 1981)

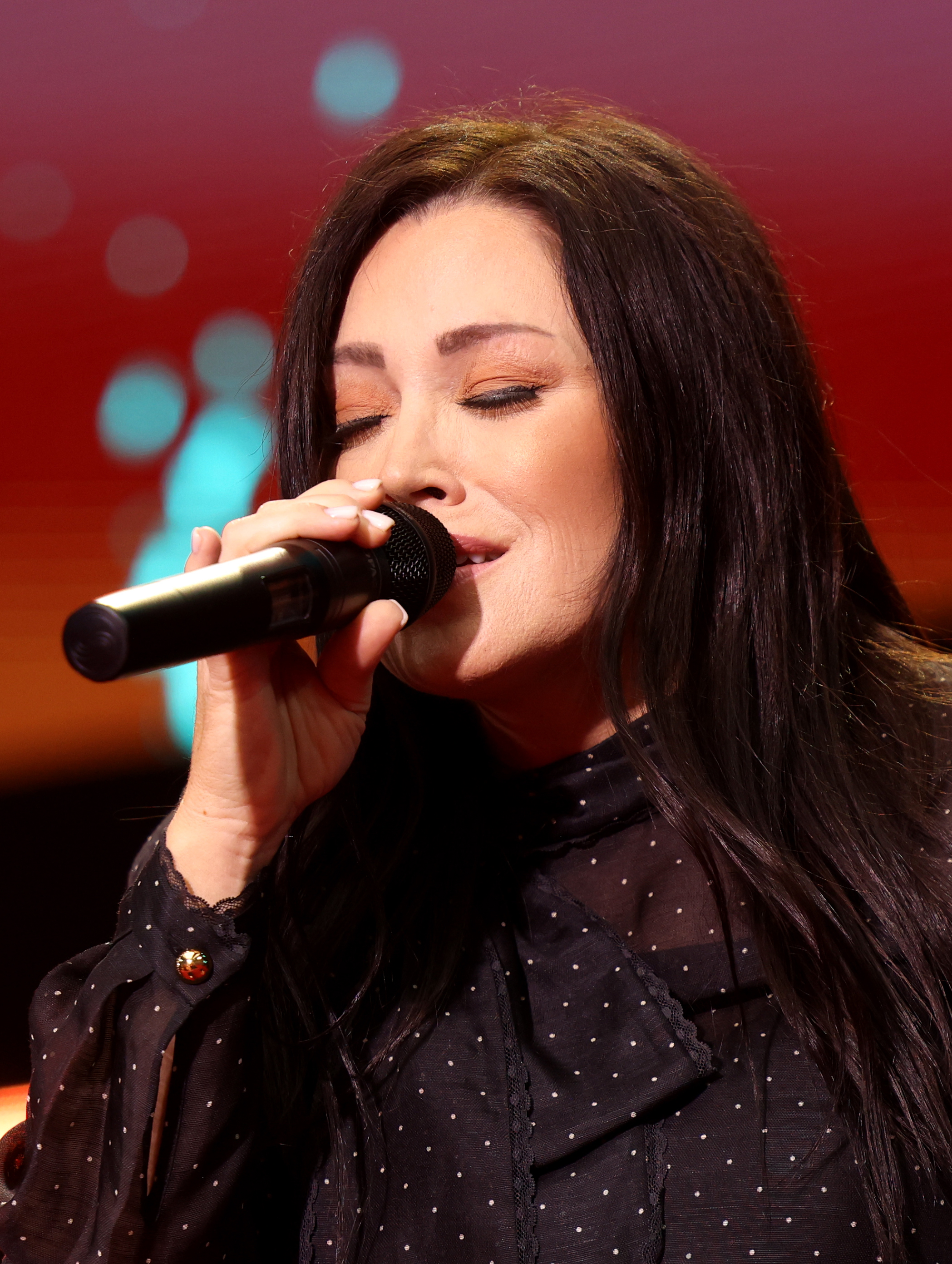
- Jobe in 2025

Background information
- Born: Kari Brooke Jobe; April 6, 1981 (age 45); Waco, Texas, U.S.
- Origin: Southlake, Texas, U.S.
- Genres: Contemporary worship music; CCM
- Occupations: Singer; songwriter; recording artist; worship leader
- Instruments: Vocals; guitar
- Years active: 2003–present
- Labels: Sparrow; EMI CMG
- Spouse: Cody Carnes (m. 2014)
- Website: karijobe.com

Kari Brooke Jobe (born April 6, 1981) is an American contemporary Christian music singer and songwriter. Since her first album in 2009, she has received two Grammy Award nominations and ten Dove Award nominations, six of which she won.

== Early life ==
Kari Jobe was born on April 6, 1981, in Waco, Texas, to parents Mark and Caroline "Sandy" (née Bragg) Jobe. She was raised in Watauga and Hurst, Texas, both suburbs of Fort Worth. She has two siblings, Kristen and Caleb. Jobe began singing at the age of three and became a Christian at the age of five. After studying at Oral Roberts University and Christ for the Nations Institute, she transferred to Dallas Baptist University, where she earned degrees in pastoral studies and psychology.

She became known with the successes "Revelation Song" and "Holy Spirit", both released in 2009.

After graduation, Jobe accepted an invitation to serve as associate worship pastor at Gateway Church in Southlake, Texas, which she had been attending for six years. She worked alongside her father, Mark, who was serving as campus pastor of Gateway's flagship campus in Southlake. She has traveled internationally on mission trips to lead worship. Jobe was also a member of Gateway Worship, a Christian worship band associated with Gateway Church. The group's live album Wake Up the World debuted at No. 2 on Billboard's Christian Albums chart in 2008.

In addition to acting as a worship leader and pastor, Jobe released her first major-label album in February 2009 on the Integrity Music/Columbia Records/Gateway Create label.

== Career ==
=== 2009–2011: Kari Jobe and Le Canto ===
Jobe released her self-titled debut album on February 10, 2009. The album charted at No. 67 on the Billboard 200 and No. 3 on Billboard's Christian music chart. A Spanish-language version of the album was released under the name Le Canto. The album Le Canto won a Dove Award in the category Spanish Album of the Year at the 41st GMA Dove Awards. Prior to releasing Kari Jobe, Jobe had released a live worship album called Throneroom Worship: Live Acoustic Worship and a Christmas album called Bethlehem.

From her self-titled album, "I'm Singing" debuted at No. 13 on Billboard's Christian singles chart. Jobe's second single, "Healer", was released in 2009 and debuted at No. 33 on Billboard's Soft A/C chart. She released the single "Adore Him" in 2009, which appeared as part of Integrity Music's compilation album Worship and Adore: A Christmas Offering.

Jobe has won two Dove Awards for Special Event Album of the Year and Spanish Language album and was nominated for New Artist of the Year.

In 2011, Jobe signed with EMI CMG Sparrow Records.

=== 2012–2017: Where I Find You, Majestic and Majestic Revisited ===
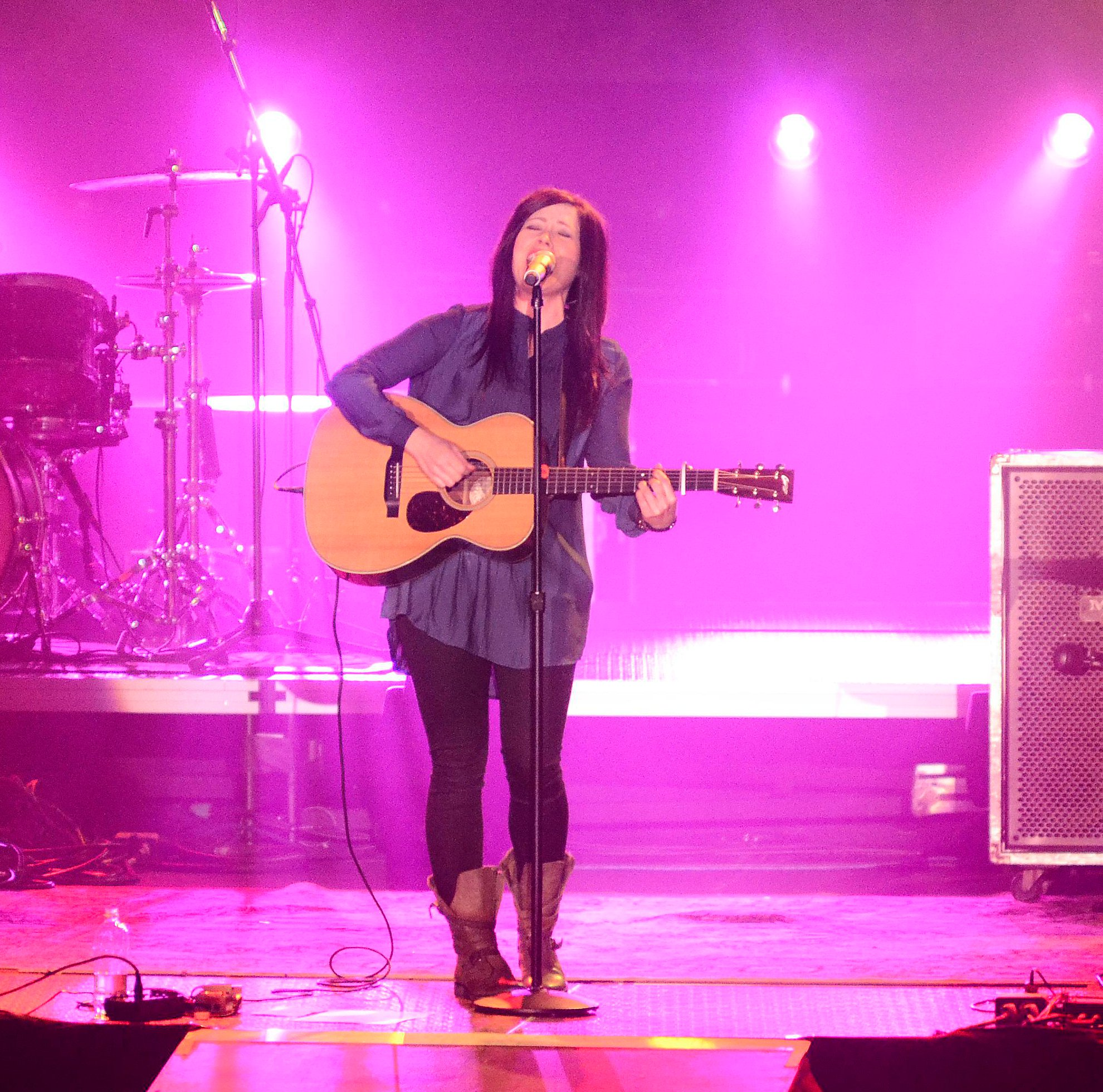
Jobe performing in 2013

Jobe released her second recording project, Where I Find You, on January 24, 2012. The album debuted at No. 75 on the Canadian Albums Chart and at No. 10 on the Billboard 200. Kari released a Spanish-language version of the album, called Donde Te Encuentro, on April 24, 2012. The album debuted at No. 6 on Billboard's Latin Pop Albums chart and at No. 19 on Top Latin Albums.

Jobe later released her first EP, The Acoustic Sessions (Live), later that year.

Jobe received her first Grammy nomination for Where I Find You as Best Contemporary Christian Album in 2012.

In May 2013, Jobe competed in season two of GSN's The American Bible Challenge, along with Sheila Walsh and author Lisa Harper. The charity they chose for the program was The A21 Campaign, an anti-trafficking organization that aims to abolish slavery.

Jobe announced the recording of a live worship album that was recorded on November 20 and 21, 2013, at the Majestic Theater in Dallas, Texas. Majestic was released on March 25, 2014, preceded by its first single "Forever" on February 18.

Majestic: Revisited was released on September 25, 2015. The album included songs from Majestic rerecorded in the studio with a different style.

=== 2017–present: The Garden and The Blessing ===
"The Cause of Christ" was released on November 4, 2016, as the lead single from her fourth studio album, The Garden. Three other singles: "Heal Our Land", "Fall Afresh" and "The Garden" were released before the album's release on February 3, 2017.

In March 2020, Jobe recorded "The Blessing" with Elevation Worship and her husband Cody Carnes at Elevation Church. She co-wrote the song with Carnes, pastor Steven Furtick and Chris Brown of Elevation Worship. The live recording was uploaded to YouTube on March 6, received 103 million views as of April 2024, and the song was streamed 57 million times in six months.

In September 2020, Jobe announced the release of her second live album, The Blessing, along with releasing "First Love", "Embers" and "Obsession" as singles from the album, as well as including "The Blessing". The album, recorded at The Belonging Co church in Nashville, was released on October 23 through Capitol CMG. The Blessing peaked at No. 3 on Billboard's Top Christian Albums and No. 7 on the Christian albums chart in the UK.

In December 2024, the SALT Christian dating app released a Music and Attraction survey. 100,000 single Christians and their music tastes and popularity were analysed and single Kari Jobe fans were amongst the most popular singles on the SALT Christian dating app, alongside fans of Upperroom Music, Needtobreathe and Lauren Daigle.

On September 21, 2025, Jobe and her husband Cody led worship for the memorial service of Charlie Kirk held at State Farm Stadium in Phoenix, Arizona. The assassination of Charlie Kirk occurred in Utah on September 10, 2025.

== Personal life ==
In August 2014, Jobe confirmed via Instagram that she became engaged to fellow Gateway Worship artist Cody Carnes. The two married on November 21, 2014.

On the red carpet at the Dove Awards 2015, Jobe announced that she and her husband were expecting a son. Jobe announced in June 2018 that she and her husband were expecting their second child, who was born on February 1, 2019.

In December 2019, the couple visited the White House and prayed with President Donald Trump. They also appeared in a video praising certain policies of the Trump administration. In response to criticism about the visit, the pair said, "We didn't know that we were going to take a picture in the Oval Office or know they were going to post it. I didn't know they were going to use a video interview that we did talking about how amazing it was to be in a White House leading worship."

== Discography ==
=== Studio albums ===
List of albums, with selected chart positions and certifications
Title	Album details	Peak chart positions				Sales
Title	Album details	US	US Christ	US Digital	UK Christ	Sales
Bethlehem	Released: 2007; Label: Sparrow	—	—	—	—	
Kari Jobe	Release date: February 10, 2009; Label: Sparrow	63	3	—	—	
Where I Find You	Release date: January 24, 2012; Label: Sparrow	10	1	5	—	
The Garden	Release date: February 3, 2017; Label: Sparrow, KAJE	22	2	6	1	

=== Live albums ===
List of albums, with selected chart positions and certifications
Title	Album details	Peak chart positions				Sales
Title	Album details	US	US Christ	US Digital	UK Christ	Sales
Majestic	Release date: March 25, 2014; Label: Sparrow	12	1	4	—	US: 343,000
The Blessing	Release date: October 23, 2020; Label: Sparrow	—	3	—	7	

=== Others ===
List of albums, with selected chart positions and certifications
Title	Album details	Peak chart positions	Sales
Title	Album details	US Christ	Sales
Throneroom Worship: Live Acoustic Worship	Released: 2004; Label: Sparrow	—	
Le Canto	Released: April 28, 2009; Label: Sparrow; Spanish version of Kari Jobe	—	
Prepare the Way – A Night of Worship With Klaus and Kari Jobe	Released: 2010; Label: Sparrow	—	
Donde Te Encuentro	Released: 2012; Label: Sparrow	—	
Majestic: Revisited	Released: September 25, 2015; Label: Sparrow	14	US: 200,000

=== EPs ===
List of albums, with selected chart positions and certifications
Title	Album details	Peak chart positions
Title	Album details	US Christ
The Acoustic Sessions (Live)	Released: July 13, 2012; Label: Sparrow	11

=== Singles ===
Year	Single	Chart positions					Certifications	Album
Year	Single	US Bubb.	US Christ.	US Christ. Airplay	US Christ. AC	US Christ. Digital	Certifications	Album
2008	"I'm Singing"	—	49		—	—		Kari Jobe
2008	"Le Canto"	—	—		—	—		Le Canto
2009	"Pure"	—	—		—	—		non-album single
2009	"Healer"	—	24		—	—		Kari Jobe
2009	"Adore Him"	—	24		22	—		Worship and Adore: A Christmas Offering
2010	"You Are for Me"	—	49		—	—		Kari Jobe
2011	"We Are"	—	8		15	3		Where I Find You
2012	"What Love Is This"	—	—		—	—		Where I Find You
2012	"Steady My Heart"	—	16		25	4		Where I Find You
2013	"Find You on My Knees"	—	37		—	—		Where I Find You
2014	"Forever"	—	6	19	28	2	RIAA: Platinum	Majestic
2014	"I Am Not Alone"	—	9	9	13	9	RIAA: Gold	Majestic
2016	"The Cause of Christ"	—	29	—	—	10		The Garden
2016	"Heal Our Land"	—	27	—	—	—		The Garden
2017	"Fall Afresh"	—	38	—	—	—		The Garden
2017	"The Garden"	—	20	—	—	16		The Garden
2017	"Let Your Glory Fall"	—	—	34	—	—		The Garden
2018	"Cover the Earth" (featuring Cody Carnes)	—	29	31	—	11		non-album single
2020	"The Blessing" (with Elevation Worship and Cody Carnes)	15	2	7	5	1	RIAA: 2× Platinum	Graves into Gardens / The Blessing
2020	"First Love"	—	31	—	—	16		The Blessing
2020	"Let the Light In"	—	34	—	—	—		The Blessing
2020	"Your Nature"	—	42	—	—	—		The Blessing

=== Compilation with Gateway Worship ===
- 2005: Kari Jobe

=== Appearances on other albums ===
- 2009: "Revelation Song" (Spanish version) with Danilo Montero on Devoción
- 2010: "Whom Shall I Fear" with Lincoln Brewster on Real Life
- 2011: "You are For Me" with C3 Church Global
- 2011: "Yahweh" and "Amazed (Obsession)" with Desperation Band on UPDATE:LIVE
- 2011: "Wondrous Love" with Aaron Shust on This Is What We Believe
- 2012: "Love Wins" with Jason Crabb on Love Is Stronger
- 2012: "My God" with Desperation Band on Center of It All
- 2012: "Look Upon the Lord" with Paul Baloche on The Same Love
- 2013: "Crown Him (Majesty)" with Chris Tomlin on Burning Lights
- 2013: "Yours Forever" with Darlene Zschech and "Victors Crown" with Darlene Zschech and Israel Houghton on Revealing Jesus
- 2013: "Revelation Song" various artists on Passion: Let the Future Begin (Live)
- 2014: "Forever" with Bethel Music on "You Make Me Brave: Live at the Civic"
- 2014: "The One That Really Matters" with Michael W. Smith on Sovereign
- 2014: "Broken" with Lecrae on Anomaly
- 2016: "Surrendered" with Chris Quilala on Split the Sky
- 2017: "Til the End of Time" and "Rooms" with Cody Carnes on The Darker the Night / The Brighter the Morning

== Awards and nominations ==
=== Billboard Music Awards ===
Year	Nominee / work	Award	Result	Ref.
2021	"The Blessing" (with Cody Carnes and Elevation Worship)	Top Christian Song	Nominated	

=== GMA Dove Awards ===
Year	Nominee / work	Award	Result
2010	Herself	Best New Artist of the Year	Nominated
2010	Le Canto	Spanish Language Album of the Year	Won
2010	Glory Revealed II: The Word of God in Worship	Special Events Album of the Year	Won
2014	Majestic	Worship Album of the Year	Won
2015	"Forever"	Song of the Year	Nominated
2015	Herself	Artist of the Year	Nominated
2017	Herself	Contemporary Christian Artist of the Year	Won
2017	The Garden	Worship Album of the Year	Nominated
2017	The Garden	Recorded Music Packaging of the Year	Won
2020	"The Blessing" (with Cody Carnes and Elevation Worship)	Worship Recorded Song of the Year	Won
2021	"The Blessing"	Song of the Year	Won
2021	The Blessing	Worship Album of the Year	Nominated
2021	The Blessing	Recorded Music Packaging of the Year	Nominated

=== Grammy Awards ===
Year	Nominee / work	Award	Result
2013	Where I Find You	Best Contemporary Christian Music Album	Nominated
2021	"The Blessing" (with Cody Carnes and Elevation Worship)	Best Contemporary Christian Music Performance/Song	Nominated
2022	The Blessing (Live)	Best Contemporary Christian Music Album	Nominated
