= Majestic: Revisited =

Studio album by Kari Jobe
- Released: September 25, 2015
- Recorded: 2015
- Genre: Contemporary Christian music, worship
- Length: 69:17
- Label: Sparrow
- Producer: Tim Yago, Jeremy Edwardson

Kari Jobe chronology
Majestic (2014)	Majestic: Revisited (2015)	The Garden (2017)

Majestic: Revisited is the fifth album release, the fourth studio album, by Kari Jobe which was released on September 25, 2015, and is her third album on the Sparrow Records label. The album is a continuation of her fourth album, Majestic, which was a live recording.

== Critical reception ==
Professional ratings
Review scores
Source	Rating
365 Days of Inspiring Media	4/5 stars
Jesus Freak Hideout	3.5/5 stars
New Release Today	4.5/5 stars

Awarding the album three and a half stars for Jesus Freak Hideout, Christopher Smith writes, "Despite any minor glitches, if soothing atmospheric worship is your cup of tea you, will want to check out Majestic (Revisited). The lyrics all point straight to Jesus and the sonic experimentation, though new territory for the worship artist, proves to be a success." Mikayla Shriver, giving the album four and a half stars from New Release Today, describes, "Her ability to sonically lead others into the presence of God is made evident in the ethereal nature of Majestic: Revisited. This album is a success as Kari provides a glimpse into her heart full of love for God, inviting us to worship with her in awe of His majesty." Rating the album four stars at 365 Days of Inspiring Media, Joshua Andre states, "there’s no doubting the passion, enthusiasm and strong faith for Jesus that Kari has."

== Track listing ==
No.	Title	Writer(s)	Length
1.	"Let the Heavens Open"	Kari Jobe, Cody Carnes	6:18
2.	"Keeper of My Heart"	Jobe, Chris Tomlin, Jason Ingram	5:14
3.	"Only Your Love"	Jobe, Ingram, Amy Davis, Ben Davis	4:30
4.	"Always Enough"	Jobe, Ingram, Reuben Morgan	5:28
5.	"Breathe on Us"	Jobe, Ed Cash	4:23
6.	"Holy Spirit" (featuring Cody Carnes)	Bryan & Katie Torwalt	5:05
7.	"I Am Not Alone"	Jobe, Davis, Austin Davis, Dustin Sauder, Grant Pittman, Marty Sampson, Mia Fieldes	4:55
8.	"How Majestic"	Jobe, Tomlin, Ingram, Matt Redman	6:41
9.	"When You Walk in the Room"	Jobe	3:21
10.	"Forever"	Jobe, Brian Johnson, Christa Black Gifford, Gabriel Wilson, Jenn Johnson, Joel Taylor	6:05
11.	"Hands to the Heavens"	Jobe, Ingram, Bryan Brown, Tofer Brown	4:14
12.	"Lord Over All"	Jobe, Ingram	5:34
13.	"Look upon the Lord"	Jobe, Ingram, Paul Baloche	7:28

== Chart performance ==
Chart (2015)	Peak position
US Christian Albums (Billboard)	14
