= Majestic (Kari Jobe album) =

Live album by Kari Jobe
- Released: March 25, 2014
- Recorded: November 20–21, 2013
- Venue: Majestic Theatre (Dallas, Texas)
- Genre: Contemporary worship music
- Length: 83:27
- Label: Sparrow
- Producer: Jeremy Edwardson

Kari Jobe chronology
Donde Te Encuentro (2012)	Majestic (2014)	Majestic: Revisited (2015)

Singles from Majestic
- 1. "Forever" Released: February 18, 2014; 2. "I Am Not Alone" Released: April 7, 2015

Majestic is the second live album by Christian singer and songwriter Kari Jobe. It is her second release with Sparrow Records. The album was recorded at the Majestic Theatre in Dallas, Texas, was produced by Jeremy Edwardson and released on March 25, 2014. It has attained critical acclamation and commercial successes.

== Background and recording ==
The material took two years to develop for the release. According to Jobe, the music is about helping people connect with the majesty of God and His son Jesus Christ, whether they are a believer or not. She said that she could not get the lyrics made by herself alone that is why she teamed-up with others, but in doing this she had to allow herself to be vulnerable in getting out of her "comfort zone". The album was recorded at the Majestic Theatre in Dallas, Texas during the performances on November 20–21, 2013. It was produced by Jeremy Edwardson. The album released on March 25, 2014 by Sparrow Records.

== Composition and musical style ==
The songs "Hands To the Heavens", "Only Your Love" and "How Majestic" are in the Brit-rock genre. "Hands To the Heavens" features electric guitars and "solid drumming". However, a critic did not like the arrangement of the bridge section because it would be hard to utilize in a corporate worship setting. "Breathe On Us" is a more "up-tempo" track in comparison to its predecessor. "Only Your Love" is a "jazzy song", with a guitar lead. "Keeper of My Heart" contains "marching" drums, and "stirring" electric guitar work. "Always Enough" is a soft worship anthem with "rousing" guitars, "an epic" crescendo, and "a captivating" instrumental bridge to the song. The piano-led "Forever" is a ballad and a worship anthem. "How Majestic" is an anthemic worship-esque song. "When You Walk In the Room" contains a "stellar" crescendo. "I Am Not Alone" is a "gorgeous" and "poignant" ballad, which contains a "rich" piano lead. "Lord Over All" is a mid-tempo song that is a guitar-driven anthem. "Look Upon the Lord" is a delicate piano ballad, which contains "Coldplay-esque swelling guitars." "Let the Heavens Open" is a Brit-rock song, which is in the vein of Delirious?.

== Critical reception ==
Professional ratings
Review scores
Source	Rating
CCM Magazine	4/5 stars
Christian Music Review	4.7/5
Christian Music Zine	4.75/5
CM Addict	4/5 stars
Jesus Freak Hideout	3.5/5 stars
Louder Than the Music	4.5/5 stars
New Release Tuesday	4.5/5 stars
Worship Leader	4.5/5 stars

Majestic garnered critical acclaim from eight music critics ratings and eleven reviews. At CCM Magazine, Caroline Lusk rated the album four stars out of five, remarking that "From the opening strands, it's clear that Majestic is not just an album; it's an experience." Jeremy Armstrong of Worship Leader rated the album four-and-a-half stars out of five, observing how "Majestic is at once overwhelming and intimate; it creates space for the Spirit to dwell and it fills all the sonic landscape with music that supports the prayers of the people." At New Release Tuesday, Kevin Davis rated the album four-and-a-half stars out of five, affirming that "Majestic is about proclaiming the majesty of God and crying out for His presence throughout this incredible worship experience, which stirs my heart, mind and soul to bow before Jesus, our Majestic King." At Christian Music Review, Jay Heilman rated the album a four-point seven out of five, thinking that "Majestic will stand the test of time and rank up there with some of the all-time greatest live worship projects."

At Louder Than the Music, Jono Davies rated the album four-and-a-half stars, noting how the release contains "so many powerful moments." Christian Music Zine's Joshua Andre rated the album a four and three fourths out of five, highlighting that with respect to this release "there's no doubting the passion, enthusiasm and strong faith for Jesus that Kari has." Andrew Funderburk of CM Addict rated the album four stars out of five, and according to him "It seems [...] that Kari Jobe's music is progressively getting better and better", and indicating how "Her experiences shine through it all." At All About Worship, Adam Hellyer gave a positive review, stating that "It's a well written, well produced worship album, which does what it says on the label." Kim Jones of Music Times gave a positive review, saying that "Every song on Majestic shines with an unchanging thirst for God's presence", and writes that "the bar was high for her first live worship album and she didn't just meet the challenge, she exceeded it."

Mark D. Geil of Jesus Freak Hideout rated the album three-and-a-half stars out of five, and according to him "Majestic therefore becomes extra-tricky, since it's a live album meant to recreate not so much a concert as a worship experience, and it's introducing all-new music at the same time." However, Geil states that "The songs are strong enough that they don't rely on a live setting with a fervent audience to communicate praise", but cautioned that "they might have spoken louder without the audience." At Hallels, Timothy Yap gave a mixed review, cautioning that "'Majestic' does [have] its share of magnificently written ballads sung tenderly and passionately by Jobe, but whether or not this album works well for congregational worship is another issue."

=== Accolades ===
This album was No. 3 on the Worship Leader's Top 20 Albums of 2014 list.

The song, "Forever (We Sing Hallelujah)", was No. 1 on the Worship Leader's Top 20 Songs of 2014 list.

== Commercial performance ==
For the Billboard charting week of April 12, 2014, Majestic was the No. 12 most sold album in the entirety of the United States via the Billboard 200, and it was the No. 1 most sold album in the Christian Albums market. Also, it was the fourth most sold Digital Album.

== Track listing ==
Standard edition
No.	Title	Writer(s)	Length
1.	"Hands to the Heavens"	Kari Jobe, Jason Ingram, Bryan Brown, Tofer Brown	8:16
2.	"Breathe on Us"	Jobe, Ed Cash	4:10
3.	"Only Your Love"	Jobe, Ingram, Amy Davis, Ben Davis	4:41
4.	"Keeper of My Heart"	Jobe, Ingram, Chris Tomlin	4:34
5.	"Always Enough"	Jobe, Ingram, Reuben Morgan	7:36
6.	"Forever"	Jobe, Brian Johnson, Christa Black Gifford, Gabriel Wilson, Jenn Johnson, Joel Taylor	6:49
7.	"How Majestic"	Jobe, Ingram, Tomlin, Matt Redman	5:24
8.	"When You Walk in the Room"	Jobe	3:10
9.	"I Am Not Alone"	Jobe, B. Davis, Austin Davis, Dustin Sauder, Grant Pittman, Marty Sampson, Mia Fieldes	5:33
10.	"Holy Spirit" (featuring Cody Carnes)	Bryan & Katie Torwalt	9:54
11.	"Lord Over All"	Jobe, Ingram	6:21
12.	"Look upon the Lord"	Jobe, Ingram, Paul Baloche	8:11
13.	"Let the Heavens Open"	Jobe, Carnes	8:47
Total length:			76:43

iTunes Store deluxe edition
No.	Title	Writer(s)	Length
14.	"Forever (Radio Version)"	Jobe, Johnson, Gifford, Wilson, J. Johnson, Taylor	4:00
15.	"Revelation Song"	Jennie Lee Riddle	5:34
16.	"You Are for Me"	Jobe	3:49
17.	"Video: Forever"		12:44
18.	"Video: Keeper of My Heart"		4:29
19.	"Video: Let the Heavens Open"		10:51
Total length:			96:50

DVD
No.	Title	Length
1.	"Intro"
2.	"Hands to the Heavens"
3.	"Breathe on Us"
4.	"Only Your Love"
5.	"Keeper of My Heart"
6.	"Always Enough"
7.	"Forever" (featuring Isaac Wimberley)
8.	"How Majestic"
9.	"When You Walk in the Room / Here I Am (Majesty)"
10.	"Revelation Song"
11.	"You Are for Me"
12.	"I Am Not Alone"
13.	"Holy Spirit" (featuring Cody Carnes)
14.	"Lord Over All"
15.	"Look upon the Lord"
16.	"Let the Heavens Open"
Total length:		113:27

== Personnel ==
- Kari Jobe – vocals
- Jonathan Berlin – keyboards, guitars, bass
- Grant Pittman – keyboards, acoustic piano, programming
- Cody Carnes – acoustic guitar, backing vocals, vocals (10)
- Tore Kulleseid – guitars
- Jeffrey Kunde – electric guitar
- Dustin Sauder – electric guitar, backing vocals
- Austin Davis – drums
- Caleb Jobe – drums, percussion
- Lewis Patzner – cello
- Anton Patzner – violin, string arrangements
- Isaac Roman – violin
- Trey Gunn – string arrangements
- Anna Byrd- backing vocals

=== Production ===
- Jimmy James – executive producer
- Kari Jobe – executive producer, creative director
- Christopher York – executive producer, A&R
- Jeremy Edwardson – producer, engineer
- Jonathan Berlin – additional production
- Michael Howell – engineer
- Sam Gibson – mixing
- Drew Lavyne – mastering
- Jess Chambers – A&R administration
- Tore Kulleseid – production assistant
- Sarah Sung – artwork, design
- Natasha Brown – photography
- David Dobson – photography

== Charts ==
Chart (2014)	Peak position
US Billboard 200	12
US Christian Albums (Billboard)	1
US Digital Albums (Billboard)	4
