= Hotel Majestic (San Francisco) =

Hotel in San Francisco, California

Coordinates: 37.7872°N 122.4254°W

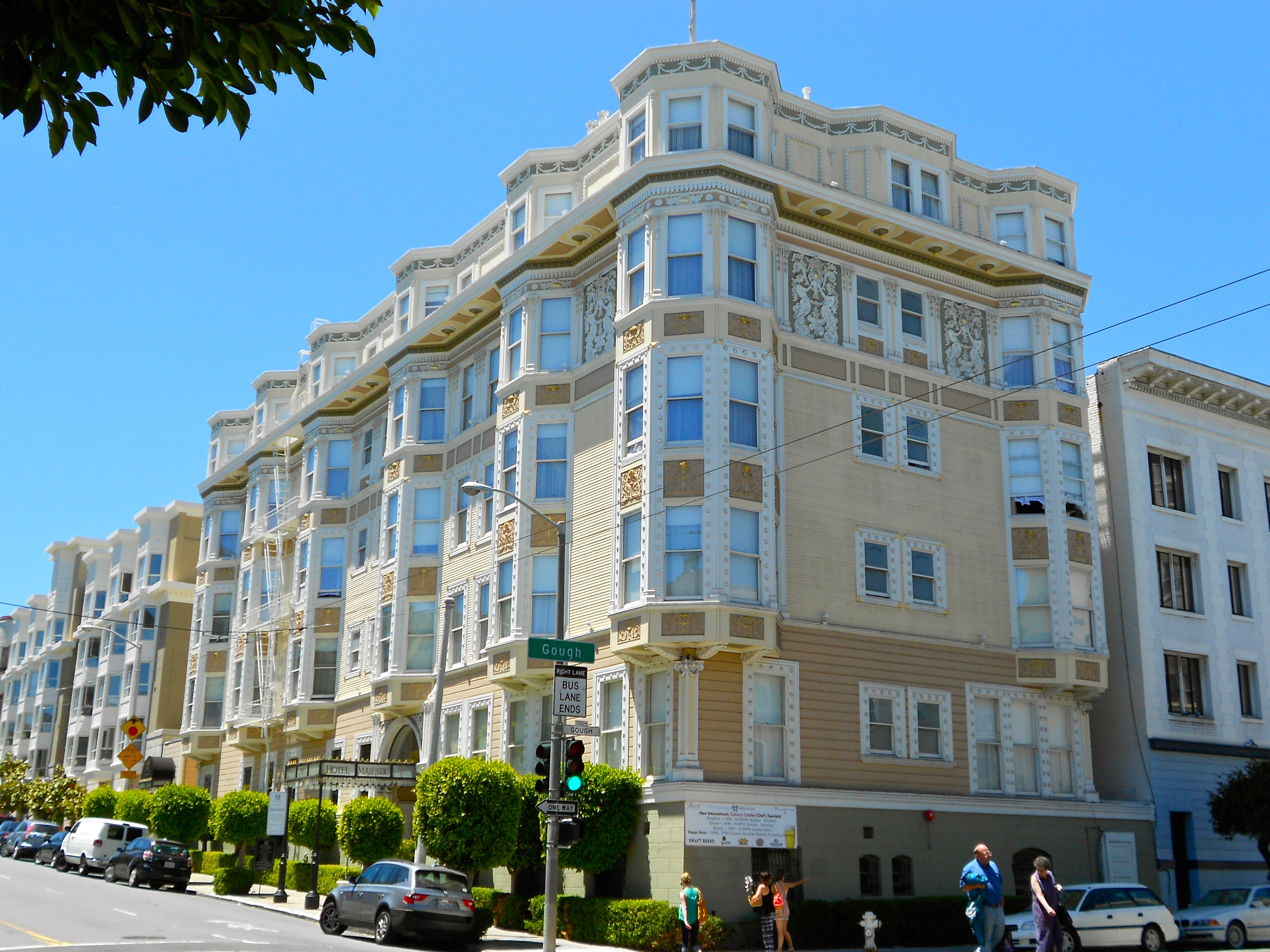
Hotel Majestic, 1500 Sutter St.

Hotel Majestic in San Francisco, California is a historic hotel built in 1902. As of 2025, it is currently the longest-operating hotel in the city, having been one of the few hotels that survived the 1906 earthquake and the subsequent fires. The fire-line ended at Van Ness Avenue, two blocks away. The hotel's history was recognized by a proclamation by then-Senator Dianne Feinstein in 2002, citing the hotel as the "longest operating hotel in San Francisco".

The hotel was built by the Schmitt family, Maurice Schmitt and Ella Schmitt, and their son Milton L. Schmitt (born 1878). Milton Schmitt was a Californian politician, serving in the California State Legislature from 1909 to 1915. The architect was Malcolm Cressy, and the building served as a hotel for many years before conversion to apartments in the 20th century. In 1965, then-owners Adrian E. and Jacquelyn G. Scharlach undertook an extensive renovation, adding a fifth floor to the hotel. It was further restored in 1985. In 2011, C. B. Patel purchased the hotel.
