= Majestic Cinema =

Majestic Cinema may refer to:

- Majestic Cinema, Bridgnorth, Shropshire, England
- Majestic Cinema, King's Lynn, Norfolk, England
- Majestic Cinema, Leeds, Yorkshire, England
