= I'm Singing =

Single by Kari Jobe

from the album Kari Jobe
- Released: November 24, 2008
- Recorded: 2008
- Genre: Contemporary Christian music
- Length: 3:47
- Label: Integrity / Columbia / Gateway Create
- Songwriter(s): Kari Jobe, Chris Tomlin, Ed Cash
- Producer(s): Ed Cash

Kari Jobe singles chronology
"I'm Singing" (2008)	"Healer" (2009)

Music video
- "I'm Singing" (Official video) on YouTube

"I'm Singing" is the debut single by Christian music singer-songwriter Kari Jobe. It debuted at No. 13 on Billboard Hot Christian Songs chart on November 25, 2008. Jobe's co-wrote the song with fellow worship singer and Christian artist Chris Tomlin, and producer Ed Cash. Jobe also recorded "I'm Singing" in Spanish titled "Le Canto", which is also the name of the Spanish album.

== Music video ==
On December 28, 2008, Jobe began asking fans via her YouTube channel to send in brief testimony video clips of their life stories, either good or bad to her to use for a music video. The music video premiered February 4 with all of the fans who had sent in clips, at the end of each testimony, proclaiming the either the words "I'm singing" or "I'm still singing" in reference to their testimony.
