= Majestic Hotel Group =

Hotel Chain in Spain

- Industry: Travel, tourism
- Founded: 1918
- Headquarters: Barcelona, Spain
- Products: Hotels
- Website: http://www.majestichotelgroup.com

The Majestic Hotel Group is a Catalan hotel group, with head office in Barcelona. It has been presided by the Soldevila-Casals family since its foundation, in 1918. Currently the group consists of five hotels and two apartment buildings: four of the hotels and the apartments are based in Barcelona and the other hotel is located in Palma of Majorca.

== Majestic Hotel & Spa Barcelona ==
The principal hotel is The Majestic Hotel & Spa Barcelona, in Barcelona, the first hotel of the group. It is a 5-star and Gran Lujo hotel in Passeig de Gracia. It was firstly opened under the name Majestic Hotel Inglaterra, but during the Spanish Civil War had to have its name changed...

The Majestic Hotel & Spa Barcelona was present at an important event in the history of Catalonia and Spain known as the “Majestic Pact”. It was a political pact made in 1996 that represented an acceptance of Catalan nationalism to the rotation power of the Spanish government and the hotel was the place where this happened. The Majestic Hotel was also the place where journalists used to write about the Ebro’s Battle, the longest and bloody battle in the Spanish Civil War, in 1938, that was covered from distance by the journalists.

Through the years, the hotel was also the place where many artists and public figures have chosen to stay. One of them was the poet Federico García Lorca, who in his last time in Barcelona, in 1935, stayed at the Majestic. In December of this year, intellectuals and Catalan dedicated to him a dinner because of his prestige.

At the hotel, the writer Antonio Machado and León Filipe also stayed a few days in their last month's alive. They were both scaping from the march of the Civil War.

The Majestic Hotel Group was classified in the Top 20 by Service in the category Small Luxury Brand on the 2016 Top Luxury Hotel & Brand Report by ReviewPro.

== Other properties ==
The other properties of the group in Barcelona are: the Hotel Murmuri, a 4-star superior hotel on Rambla Catalunya; Hotel Midmost, a 4-star boutique hotel recently opened and Hotel Denit, a 3 star located nearby Plaza Catalunya. The two apartments are: the Murmuri Residence and the Majestic Residence, located next to Murmuri hotel and the Majestic hotel respectively. In Palma of Majorca, the group has the hotel Sant Francesc, a 5-star boutique hotel located on Sant Francesc Square.
