= Majestic Theatre =

Majestic Theatre or Majestic Theater may refer to:

== Australia ==
- Majestic Theatre, Adelaide, former name of a theatre in King William Street, Adelaide, built 1916, now demolished
- Majestic Theatre, Launceston, a former cinema in Tasmania designed by Greek-Australian businessman Marino Lucas
- Majestic Theatre, Pomona, a heritage-listed silent movie theatre in Queensland
- Majestic Picture Theatre, Malanda, a heritage-listed movie theatre in Queensland

== Singapore ==
- The Majestic, Singapore, a historic building and former theatre in Chinatown, Singapore

== United States ==
- CIBC Theatre, Chicago, Illinois, opened in 1906 as the Majestic Theatre
- Cutler Majestic Theatre, Boston, Massachusetts, a 1903 performing arts center at Emerson College
- Majestic Repertory Theatre, Las Vegas, a 2016 local community theatre
- Majestic Theatre (Bridgeport, Connecticut), a 1922 theatre
- Majestic Theatre (Broadway), New York City, a 1927 theatre
- Majestic Theatre (Brooklyn), former name of the BAM Harvey Theatre
- Majestic Theatre (Chillicothe), Ohio, the oldest continuously operating theater in the US
- Majestic Theatre (Columbus Circle), New York City, a 1903 building, demolished in 1954
- Majestic Theatre (Dallas), Texas, a 1920 performing arts theatre in the City Center District
- Majestic Theatre (Detroit), a 1915 theatre in Michigan
- Majestic Theatre (East St. Louis), St. Clair County, Illinois
- Majestic Theatre, Grand Rapids, Wisconsin, part of the Grand Rapids Civic Theatre & School of Theatre Arts
- Majestic Theatre (Los Angeles), now demolished
- Majestic Theatre (Madison), a historic landmark
- Majestic Theatre, Providence, Rhode Island, now known as Trinity Repertory Company
- Majestic Theatre (San Antonio), Texas, a theatre built in 1929
- Majestic Theater, part of the Brooklyn Academy of Music in Brooklyn, New York

== See also ==
- Majestic (disambiguation)
