= Hotel Majestic (Tunis) =

Hotel in Tunis, Tunisia

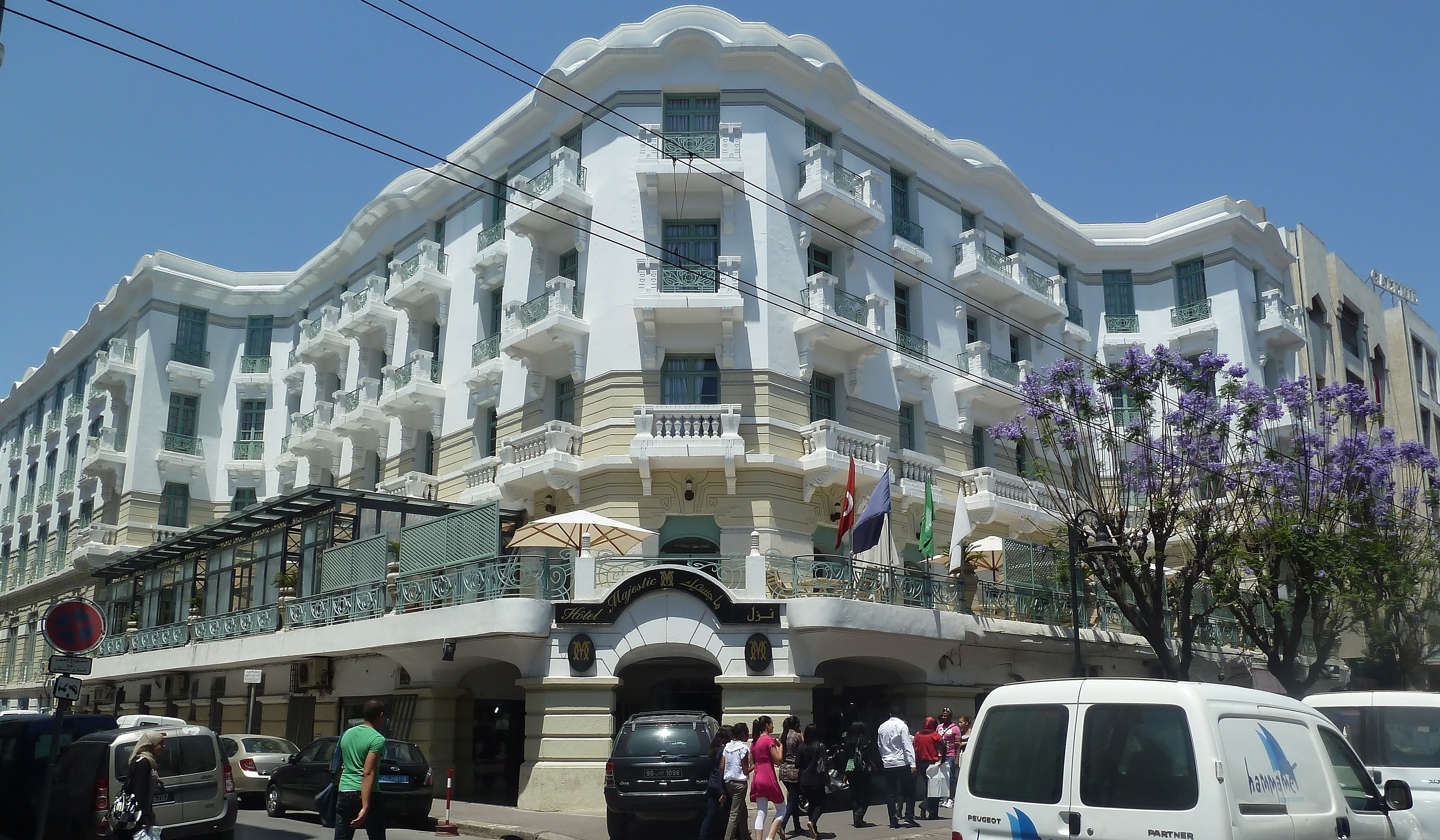

- Location in Tunisia

General information
- Location: Avenue de Paris, Tunis, Tunisia, 36, Avenue de Paris - 1000 - Tunis
- Coordinates: 36°48′16″N 10°10′48″E

Technical details
- Floor count: 4

Other information
- Number of rooms: 22

Website
- www.majestichotel.tn

Hotel Majestic is a historical hotel on the Avenue de Paris in Tunis, Tunisia. It was built in 1914 and is noted for its Art Nouveau architecture with a white facade and gently curved corners. The hotel is four storeys high and the first floor has a terrace. The hotel overlooks the Jardin Habib Thameur.
