= Majestic Hôtel-Spa =

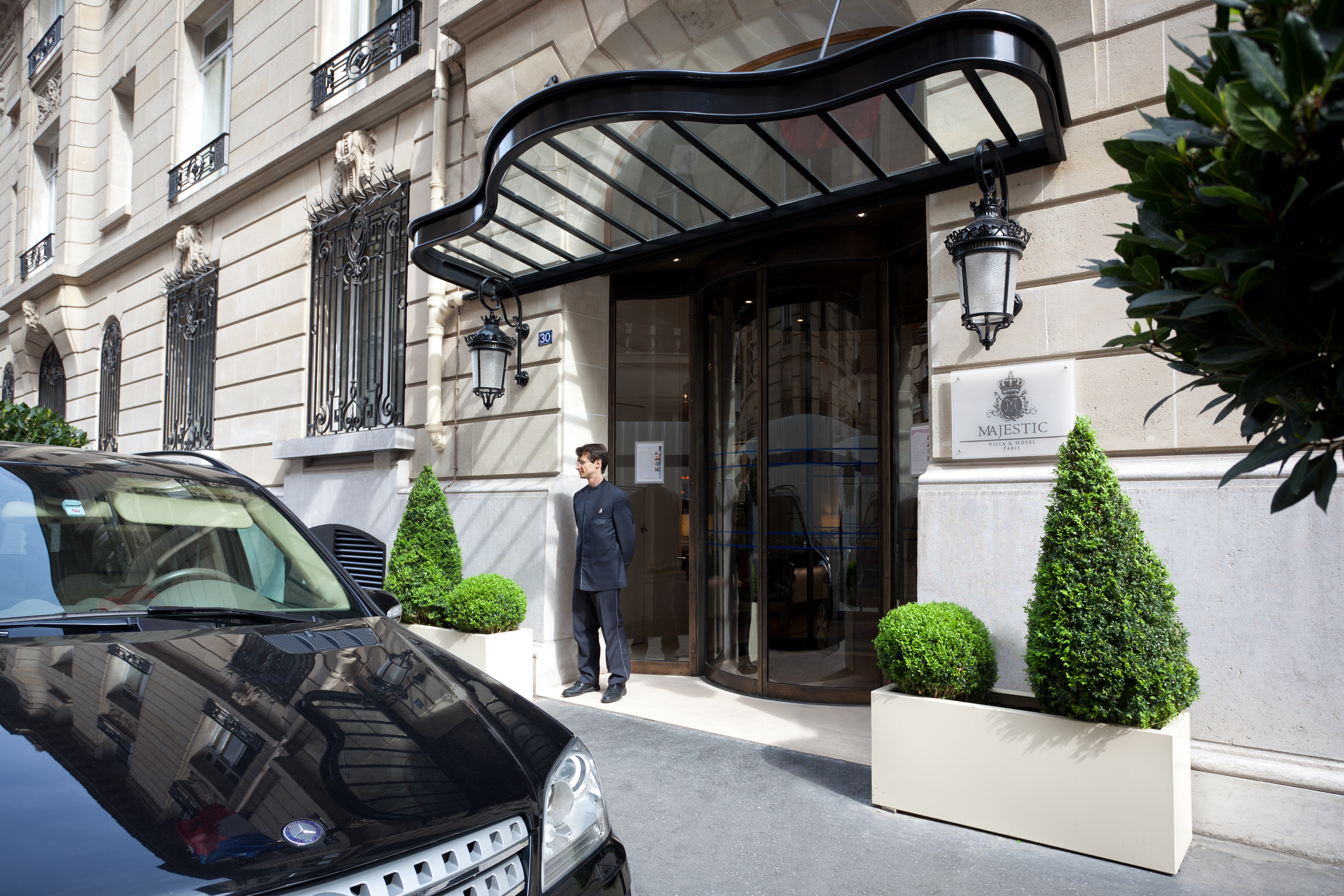
- Interactive map of the Majestic Hôtel-Spa area

General information
- Location: 30 rue La Pérouse, 16th arrondissement, Paris
- Coordinates: 48°52′13″N 2°17′37″E
- Operator: Les Hôtels Baverez

Other information
- Number of rooms: 52

Website
- www.majestic-hotel.com

Majestic Hôtel-Spa is a French luxury hotel that is located at 30 rue La Pérouse in the 16th arrondissement of Paris. It belongs to Les Hôtels Baverez.

== History ==
The original Hôtel Majestic was built by Léonard Tauber and opened in 1908 as the second hotel of what is now the Baverez hotel group. It was located on the other side of rue La Pérouse in the building that is now known as The Peninsula Paris hotel. That building was purchased by the French government in 1936 to serve as offices for the Ministry of War. (The French government sold that building to Katara Hospitality in 2007 as part of a cost-cutting measure. It was then completely renovated, and it opened as The Peninsula Paris in August 2014.)

The building at 30 rue La Pérouse was inaugurated in February 2010 under the name of Hôtel Majestic Villa. The name was subsequently changed to Majestic Hôtel-Spa.

== Characteristics ==
Majestic Hôtel-Spa is a five-star hotel that counts 52 rooms, including 24 suites. The hotel has a spa, a bar Le PremiuM, and a restaurant Le MagnuM.

The spa MAJClub is equipped with a swimming pool, a fitness center, saunas, hammams and treatment rooms.
