= Atout France =

France Tourism Development Agency

- Formation: 2009
- Type: Statutory body
- Legal status: Active
- Headquarters: Paris, France
- Region served: France
- Official language: French
- Interim CEO: Rose-Marie Abel
- Affiliations: Minister of Tourism (France)
- Budget: 80 M EUR
- Staff: 320
- Website: atout-france.fr

Atout France, the France Tourism Development Agency (formerly Maison de la France, the French National Tourist Office), is the French organisation responsible for promoting France as a tourism destination.

== History ==
Atout France was created on 22 July 2009 for the development and modernization of tourism services in France. It was created by merging Maison de la France, an agency that promotes the French culture abroad, and ODIT France, a tourism engineering company.

This merger brought together all the functions of promotion including campaigns, press campaigns, canvassing and tourism engineering such as diagnosis, development plans, project management assistance etc. under a single entity to strengthen the positioning of French tourism.

== Status ==
The agency is placed under the supervision of the Minister of Tourism, Government of France.

Its status as an economic interest group reflects the desire to carry out the public service mission of the Ministry of Tourism in partnership with the State, Central Administrations and local authorities, and the tourism professions, including the major French and foreign industrial and commercial groups involved in tourism. As of 2023, Atout France has total 1,200 partners both from public and private tourism professionals.

The General Assembly of the EIG is chaired by the Minister of Tourism. Its board of directors has 37 members, one third of whom are representatives of the state and two thirds of whom are tourism professionals.
