= Mount Majestic (Victoria) =

Mountain in Victoria, Australia

Coordinates: 37.9424°S 145.4676°E

Mount Majestic is a 366-metre (1,201 ft) mountain in Victoria, Australia, primarily within the town of Cockatoo. It is located in the Cardinia region, about 47 kilometres (29 mi) east of the state capital Melbourne. Its peak about 9 metres (30 ft) above the surrounding terrain.

The area near Mount Majestic it is quite sparsely populated, with 34 inhabitants per square kilometre. The nearest major community is Berwick, about 15 kilometres to the southwest.

Vegetation in the area of the mountain is primarily evergreen decidious forest. The average annual rainfall is 1,391 millimetres (54.8 in). The wettest month is June, with an average of 161 millimetres (6.3 in) of precipitation, and the driest is January, with 57 millimetres (2.2 in) of precipitation.

== See also ==
- List of mountains in Australia § Victoria
