= Tedashii discography =

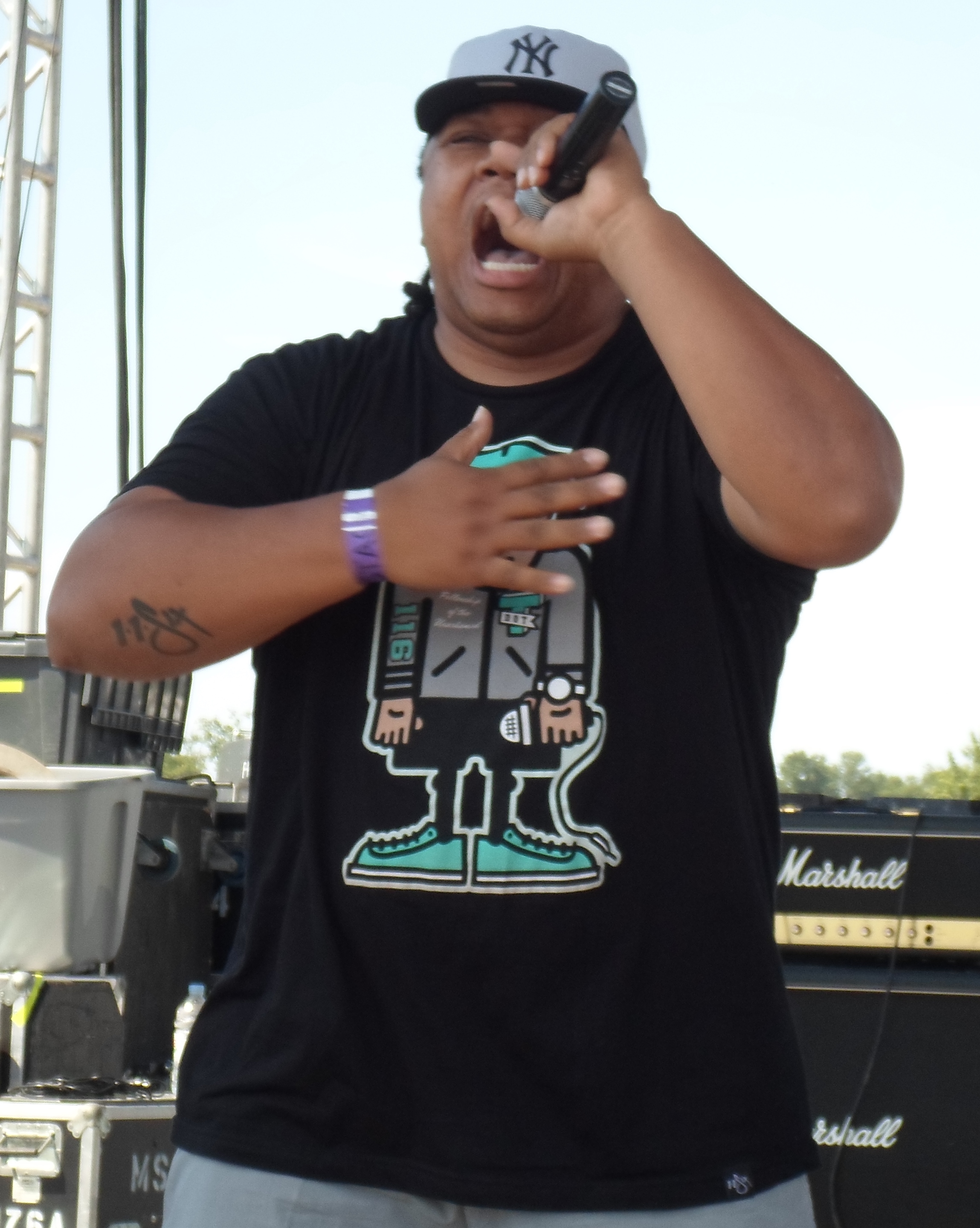
- Tedashii performing live at Ichthus Music Festival in June 2012.
- Studio albums: 5
- EPs: 4
- Singles: 14
- Music videos: 13
- Guest appearances: 24
- Collaborative: 1

The discography of Tedashii, an American Christian hip hop artist, consists of five studio albums, four extended plays, including three as a founding member of the group 116 Clique, a remix EP by 116 Clique, fourteen singles, including five as a featured performer and two with 116 Clique, thirteen music videos, including seven as a featured performer and two with 116 Clique, a contributed track to a compilation album, and twenty-four guest appearances.

== Albums ==
=== Studio albums ===
Year	Title	Chart positions					
Year	Title	US	US Gospel	US Christ.	US Ind.	US Rap	US Digital
2006	Kingdom People: 1st studio album; Released: October 3, 2006; Label: Reach	—	—	—	—	—	—
2009	Identity Crisis: 2nd studio album; Released: May 26, 2009; Label: Reach	137	2	10	19	—	—
2011	Blacklight: 3rd studio album; Released: May 30, 2011; Label: Reach	63	2	1	8	9	11
2014	Below Paradise: 4th studio album; Released: May 27, 2014; Label: Reach	17	1	2	2	2	10
2019	Never Fold: 5th studio album; Released: March 8, 2019; label: Reach	—	—	7	21	9	25
"—" denotes releases that did not chart

=== EPs ===
Year	Title	Chart positions
Year	Title	U.S. Christ.
2016	This Time Around: First EP; Released: March 4, 2016; Label: Reach	9
2022	This Time Around 2: Second EP; Released: October 14, 2022; Label: Reach	
2023	Dead Or Alive, Pt. 1: Third EP; Released: September 15, 2023; Label: Reach	
2024	Dead Or Alive, Pt. 2: Fourth EP; Released: March 15, 2024; Label: Reach	
"—" denotes releases that did not chart

=== With 116 Clique ===
==== EPs ====
Year	Title	Chart positions	
Year	Title	U.S. Gospel	U.S. Christ.
2007	Amped: First EP; Released: August 28, 2007; Label: Reach	24	—
"—" denotes releases that did not chart

=== With Reach Records ===
==== Playlists ====
Year	Title
2018	Summer Eighteen: First Playlist; Released: July 20, 2018; Label: Reach

=== Collaborative albums ===
Year	Album
2010	The Church: Called & Collected: Released: June 8, 2010; Label: Lamp Mode; Contributing track: "Discipleship"

== Singles ==
=== As lead artist ===
Year	Title	Chart positions		Album
Year	Title	US Christ.	US Gospel	Album
2009	"26's" (featuring Lecrae)	—	—	Identity Crisis
2009	"I'm a Believer" (featuring Trip Lee & Soyé)	—	—	Identity Crisis
2010	"Bury Me" (featuring Lecrae)	—	—	non-album singles
2010	"Brand New" (featuring Jai)	—	—	non-album singles
2011	"Need It Daily" (featuring PRo)	—	—	Blacklight
2011	"Riot"	—	—	Blacklight
2014	"Dark Days, Darker Nights" (featuring Britt Nicole)	47	19	Below Paradise
2014	"Nothing I Can't Do" (featuring Lecrae & Trip Lee)	24	11	Below Paradise
2015	"Jumped Out the Whip"	—	—	This Time Around
2016	"I'm Good"	—	—	This Time Around
2017	"Free"	—	—	non-album singles
2017	"Way Up" (featuring KB)	45	—	non-album singles
2017	"Messenger"	—	—	non-album singles
2018	"Emmanuel"	—	—	non-album singles
2018	"Splash" (featuring 1K Phew)	—	—	non-album singles
2018	"Smile"	—	—	Never Fold
2018	"Gotta Live" (featuring Jordan Feliz)	25	—	Never Fold
2018	"What's the Case" (featuring nobigdyl.)	—	—	Summer Eighteen
2018	"We Came to Play" (featuring Canon)	—	—	Summer Eighteen
2019	"God Flex" (featuring Trip Lee)	—	—	Never Fold
2019	"Get Out My Way" (featuring Lecrae)	42	—	Never Fold
2019	"Home" (featuring Crowder)	—	—	Never Fold
2019	"Activate" (featuring Steven Malcolm)	—	—	Summer Nineteen
2022	"Respect My Team" (with Trip Lee & Lecrae)	—	—	TBA
2025	"Give It All"	—	—	Non-album single

=== As featured performer ===
Title	Year	Album
"Amp It Up" (Lecrae featuring Tedashii)	2010	Non-album single for Camp Kanakuk
"Ring Christmas Bells (Carol of the Bells)" (Folk Angel featuring Tedashii)	2011	Comfort & Joy - Christmas Songs: v.iii
"Making Me Over" (Json featuring Tedashi and Pastor AD3)	2012	Growing Pains
"Go Off" (KB featuring Andy Mineo and Tedashii)	2012	Weight & Glory
"Lord Have Mercy" (Lecrae featuring Tedashii)	2012	Gravity
"Chainsaw" (Family Force 5 featuring Tedashii)	2013	Reanimated
"Promised Land (Glory, Hallelujah)" (Crowder featuring Tedashii)	2016	American Prodigal

- Watch them fall (2020) Unsecret (featuring Tedashii and Sam Tinnesz) -Adrenaline (2020) Unsecret (featuring Tedashii and Sam Tinnesz)

=== With 116 Clique ===
Title	Year	Album
"Man Up Anthem"	2011	Man Up
"Come Alive"	2012	Non-album single

== Other charted songs ==
Year	Title	Chart positions	Album
Year	Title	US Gospel	Album
2014	"Earthquake" (featuring KB and Dimitri McDowel)	22	Below Paradise (deluxe edition)

== Guest appearances ==
Title	Year	Other performer(s)	Album
"Represent"	2004	Lecrae	Real Talk
"The Line"	2004	Lecrae	Real Talk
"Aliens"	2004	Lecrae	Real Talk
"Call Us Crazy"	2006	Trip Lee	If They Only Knew
"Unashamed"	2006	Lecrae	After the Music Stops
"Shinin'"	2007	FLAME	Our World: Fallen
"Name Up"	2007	The Cross Movement	HIStory: Our Place in His Story
"North & South"	2007	Phanatik, Christawn	Crime & Consequences
"Maranatha"	2007	Sho Baraka, Json	Turn My Life Up
"Back Up"	2008	Cam, Sho Baraka	The Platform
"Real Vision"	2008	Trip Lee	20/20
"Behold the Spirit"	2008	Trip Lee	20/20
"Listening Choice"	2008	Json	Life on Life
"Go Hard"	2008	Lecrae	Rebel
"26's (Chopped-n-Screwed)"	2009	DJ Primo	Non-album single
"Walk Worthy"	2009	Dillon Chase	The Pursuit
"I.T.W.N.O.I."	2010	Sho Baraka, R-Swift, Honey LaRochelle, Benjah	Lions and Liars
"I'm Not"	2010	Decipha	Rep
"Bear With You"	2010	Trip Lee	Between Two Worlds
"The Invasion (Hero) [Remix]"	2010	Trip Lee, Jai, Mac the Doulos, Stephen the Levite, Brenden McPeek, J.R.	Between Two Worlds (Family Christian edition)
"40 Deep"	2010	Lecrae, Trip Lee	Rehab
"I'm Good Remix"	2010	Dre Sr., Sauce Remix, A-one, Bumps INF, Tword, Katalyst aka Kareem Manuel, KamB.I.N.O.	The Maturation
"Go"	2011	KB	Who Is KB?
"Going In"	2011	PRo, Lecrae	Dying to Live
"Schizo/Hollow Dreams Interlude"	2012	Swoope	Wake Up
"Finer Things"	2013	Lecrae	Church Clothes 2
"Loud & Clear" (featuring Jon White of Capital Kings & Tedashii)	2014	Da' T.R.U.T.H.	Heartbeat
"#SameTeam" (featuring Tedashii, Yaves, Dre Murray, JGivens & John Givez)	2014	Swoope	Sinema
"Slow Down" (featuring Tedashii & Tony Tillman)	2015	Derek Minor	Empire

== Music videos ==
=== As lead artist ===
Title	Year	Director
"Make War"	2010	1060 Creative
"Need it Daily" (featuring PRo)	2011	Kyle Dettman
"Last Goodbye" (featuring Benjah)	2011	Jordan Smith
"Dum Dum" (featuring Lecrae)	2011	Scott Leduc
"Nothing I Can't Do" (featuring Trip Lee & Lecrae)	2014	Kyle Dettman

=== As a featured performer ===
Title	Year	Director
"Jesus Muzik" (Lecrae featuring Trip Lee with a cameo from Tedashii)	2006	Tripp Crosby
"Go Hard" (Lecrae featuring Tedashii)	2008	Kevin Adamson
"Real Vision" (Trip Lee featuring Tedashii)	2009	—N/a
"Walk Worthy" (Dillon Chase featuring Tedashii)	2010	—N/a
"I'm Not" (Decipha featuring Tedashii)	2011	—N/a
"Lord Have Mercy" (Lecrae featuring Tedashii with a cameo from No Malice)	2012	Motion Family
"Chainsaw" (Family Force 5 featuring Tedashii)	2013	Tessa Violet, Matthew Underwood

=== With 116 Clique ===
	Year	Director
"116 Clique Video"	2006	Sho Baraka
"Man Up Anthem" (featuring Lecrae, KB, Trip Lee, Tedashii, PRo, Andy Mineo, and Sho Baraka)	2011	—N/a
