= Trip Lee discography =

- Studio albums: 8
- EPs: 1
- Singles: 13
- Music videos: 14
- Guest appearances: 29
- Collaborative: 1

The discography of Trip Lee, an American Christian hip hop artist, consists of eight studio albums, including three as a founding member of the group 116 Clique, one EP with 116 Clique, thirteen singles, including three as a featured performer and two with 116 Clique, fourteen music videos, including three as a featured performer and two with 116 Clique, a contributed track to a compilation album, and twenty-nine guest appearances.

== Albums ==
=== Studio albums ===
Year	Album details	Peak chart positions					
Year	Album details	US	US Christ	US Indie	US Rap	US Gospel	US Digital
2006	If They Only Knew: First studio album; Release date: May 26, 2006; Label: Reach	—	—	—	—	—	—
2008	20/20: Second studio album; Release date: May 20, 2008; Label: Reach	193	11	18	—	4	—
2010	Between Two Worlds: Third studio album; Release date: June 22, 2010; Label: Reach	58	1	8	10	1	—
2012	The Good Life: Fourth studio album; Release date: April 10, 2012; Label: Reach	17	1	—	3	1	11
2014	Rise: Fifth studio album; Release date: October 27, 2014; Label: Reach	16	2	2	2	1	4
2022	The End: Sixth studio album; Release date: March 4, 2022; Label: Reach	—	27	—	—	—	—
2023	The Epilogue: Seventh studio album; Release date: October 27, 2023; Label: Reach	—	—	—	—	—	—
"—" denotes releases that did not chart
Note: Beginning in 2015, Billboard rendered most hip hop/rap albums ineligible for the Gospel charts

=== With 116 Clique ===
- The Compilation Album (2005)
- 13 Letters (2007)
- Man Up (2011)
- Amped (2007)

=== Collaborative albums ===
2010	The Church: Called & Collected: Released: June 8, 2010; Label: Lamp Mode; Contributing track: "Conversion"

=== Extended plays ===
2026	For Your Glory: Releasing: February 13, 2026; Label: Reach Records; Formats: To be announced

=== Mixtapes ===
Year	Album details	Peak chart positions		
Year	Album details	US	US R&B/HH	US Christ
2016	The Waiting Room: First mixtape (with Reach); Release date: December 9, 2016; Label: Reach	139	16	7
"—" denotes releases that did not chart

== Singles ==
=== As lead artist ===
Title	Year	Peak chart positions			Album
Title	Year	US Christ.	US Christ. Air.	US Gospel	Album
"The Invasion (Hero)" (featuring Jai)	2010	—	—	—	Between Two Worlds
"No Worries"	2010	—	—	—	Between Two Worlds
"Brag on My Lord"	2011	—	—	—	Non-album single
"Robot" (featuring Jai)	2011	—	—	—	The Good Life
"I'm Good" (featuring Lecrae)	2011	—	—	—	The Good Life
"Fallin'" (featuring J. Paul)	2011	—	—	—	The Good Life
"Schweet" (featuring Jai)	2014	24	—	10	Rise
"Sweet Victory" (featuring Dimitri McDowell and Leah Smith)	2014	19	—	7	Rise
"Manolo" (featuring Lecrae)	2014	17	—	3	Rise
"Beautiful Life 2 (Mine)"	2014	40	—	19	Rise
"Stone"	2022	—	—	—	The End
"Respect My Team" (featuring Tedashii and Lecrae)	2022	—	—	—	Non-album single
"At the Cross" (featuring Madison Ryann Ward)	2023	—	—	—	The Epilogue
"Glory"	2023	—	—	—	The Epilogue
"Texas Pete" (featuring Lecrae)	2023	—	—	—	Non-album singles
"Confetti"	2023	—	—	—	Non-album singles
"Standby" (featuring Hulvey)	2023	—	—	—	Non-album singles
"Lay Down (Safe & Sound)"	2025	—	—	—	Non-album singles
"King David" (featuring 116, Lecrae, and Anike)	2025	—	—	—	Non-album singles
"Found Me"	2025	—	—	—	Non-album singles
"For Your Glory"	2026	—	—	—	For Your Glory (EP)
"Draw My Eyes" (with Doe)	2026	—	—	—	For Your Glory (EP)
"Fortress" (with Naomi Raine)	2026	—	40	—	For Your Glory (EP)
"—" denotes a recording that did not chart or was not released in that territory.

=== As featured artist ===
Title	Year	Album
"Jesus Muzik" (Lecrae featuring Trip Lee)	2006	After the Music Stops
"We Can Be More" (Gentlemen's Remix) (Sho Baraka featuring J.R., Trip Lee, Alex Medina & Flame)	2010	Non-album single
"Live it Up" (The Ambassador featuring Trip Lee)	2012	Xist Music Presents: Move Vol. 1
"Nothing I Can't Do" (Tedashii featuring Trip Lee & Lecrae)	2014	Below Paradise
"Praying Hands (Remix)" (Ty Brasel featuring Trip Lee)	2018	Non-album single

=== With 116 Clique ===
Title	Year	Album
"Man Up Anthem"	2011	Man Up
"Come Alive"	2012	Non-album single

== Other charted songs ==
Title	Year	Peak chart positions		Album
Title	Year	US Christ.	US Gospel	Album
"The Saints" (Andy Mineo featuring KB and Trip Lee)	2013	44	18	Heroes for Sale
"Lazarus" (featuring This'l)	2014	48	—	Rise
"Insomniac" (featuring Andy Mineo)	2014	39	20	Rise
"Too Cold"	2016	29	—	The Waiting Room
"Clouds"	2016	40	—	The Waiting Room
"Billion Years" (featuring Taylor Hill)	2016	43	—	The Waiting Room
"Lord Have Mercy"	2016	49	—	The Waiting Room
"Still Unashamed" (featuring Tedashii)	2016	50	—	The Waiting Room
"—" denotes a recording that did not chart or was not released in that territory.

== Guest appearances ==
Title	Year	Other performer(s)	Album
"We Did"	2006	Tedashii	Kingdom People
"In Ya Hood (Cypha Remix)"	2006	Tedashii, Trip Lee, Thi'sl, Json, Sho Baraka, Lecrae	Kingdom People
"Jesus Muzik"	2006	Lecrae	After the Music Stops
"Holla At Me"	2007	Everyday Process	Everyday Process: The Process of Illumination and Elimination
"The Last Cypha"	2007	The Cross Movement, R-Swift, Everyday Process, Da' T.R.U.T.H., FLAME	History: Our Place in His Story
"Price Tag"	2007	Da' T.R.U.T.H.	Open Book
"Slow It Down (Simplify Your Life)"	2007	Sho Baraka	Turn My Life Up
"Ridaz"	2007	J.R., Da' T.R.U.T.H., Iz-Real	Life by Stereo
"What It Do"	2008	Json, Titus	Life on Life
"Checkin' for My God (remix)"	2008	The Ambassador, Lecrae	The Chop Chop: From Milk to Meat
"Fall Back"	2008	Lecrae	Rebel
"I Been Redeemed"	2008	FLAME	Our World: Redeemed
"I'm a Believer"	2009	Tedashii, Soyé	Identity Crisis
"Transformers"	2009	Tedashii, Lecrae	Rejected B-side to Identity Crisis
"Trumpet Blow"	2009	Da' T.R.U.T.H.	The Big Picture
"Get Busy"	2009	DJ Official	Entermission
"Revolutionary Died"	2010	Sho Baraka	Lions and Liars
"The Rising"	2010	Sho Baraka, Erica Cumbo	Lions and Liars
"Grace Amazing"	2010	Jimmy Needham	Nightlights
"40 Deep"	2010	Lecrae, Tedashii	Rehab
"Gentleness"	2010	B3AR FRUIT	Fruit Cocktail
"No One Greater"	2011	PRo, Json	Dying to Live
"Open Letter (Battlefield)"	2012	KB, Swoope, Jai	Weight & Glory
"Getting By"	2012	Derek Minor fka PRo	PSA, Vol. 3: Who is Derek Minor
"Fallin' Down"	2012	Lecrae, Swoope	Gravity
"Delight"	2012	God's Servant	Simple Love
"Hope"	2012	Da' T.R.U.T.H., Thi'sl, FLAME	Love, Hope, and War
"The Saints"	2013	Andy Mineo, KB	Heroes for Sale
"The Saints Remix"	2013	Black Knight, Andy Mineo, KB	#ItsTheBlackKnight Beat Tape
"Light Up"		Alex Faith	At Last
"Nothing I Can't Do	2014	Tedashii, Lecrae	Below Paradise
"You & Me" "God Flex"	2018	William Matthews, Amanda Cook Tedashii	Kosmos

== Music videos ==
=== As lead artist ===
Title	Year	Director
"Real Vision" (featuring Tedashii)	2009	—N/a
"The Invasion (Hero)" (featuring Jai)	2010	TK McKamy
"I'm Good" (featuring Lecrae)	2012	Kyle Dettman
"Fallin'" (featuring J. Paul)	2012	Francis De La Torre
"One Sixteen" (featuring KB and Andy Mineo)	2012	—N/a
"Shweet"	2014	Ry and Drew Cox
"Sweet Victory"	2015	—N/a
"Manolo" (featuring Lecrae)	2015	
"Too Cold"	2016	—N/a
"You Got It"	2021	—N/a
"Supernatural"	2021	
"Stone"	2022	—N/a
"Right Out The Gate"	2022	
"Mercy" (featuring Kirk Franklin)	2023	

=== As featured artist ===
Title	Year	Director
"Jesus Muzik" (Lecrae featuring Trip Lee and Tedashii)	2006	Tripp Crosby
"Grace Amazing" (Jimmy Needham featuring Trip Lee)	2011	Nathan Corrona
"Hope" (Da' T.R.U.T.H. featuring Thi'sl, FLAME, and Trip Lee)	2013	Will Thomas

=== With 116 Clique ===
	Year	Director
"116 Clique Video"	2006	Sho Baraka
"Man Up Anthem" (featuring Lecrae, KB, Trip Lee, Tedashii, PRo, Andy Mineo, and Sho Baraka)	2011	—N/a
