= So Hot Productions =

- Origin: St. Louis, Missouri U.S.
- Genres: Hip hop, R&B, pop
- Occupation: Production Team
- Instruments: Vocals, Piano, Keyboard, Guitar, Drum Machine, Samples
- Years active: 1999-present
- Label: Unsigned
- Members: J.R.
- Website: So Hot Music

So Hot Productions is a music production company located in St. Louis, Missouri.

== Awards and nominations ==
The following albums feature production by So Hot Productions.

- Stellar Awards
  - 2006, The Incredible Walk (nominated)
  - 2006, The Thesis (nominated)
  - 2007, Real Talk (nominated)
  - 2007, The Faith (won)
  - 2008, HIStory: Our Place In His Story (nominated)
- Grammy Awards
  - 2006, Higher Definition (nominated)
  - 2008, HIStory: Our Place In His Story (nominated)
  - 2008, Open Book (nominated)

== Partial discography ==
=== 2004 ===
- "Gift Rap" - The Cross Movement & Friends
- "Higher Definition" - The Cross Movement

=== 2005 ===
- "116 Clique: The Compilation Album" - 116 Clique
- "The Faith" - Da' T.R.U.T.H.
- "The Incredible Walk" - Phanatik
- "The Journal, Vol. 1" - T.R.U.-L.I.F.E.
- "Metamorphosis" - J.R.
- "Rewind" - FLAME
- "The Thesis" - The Ambassador

=== 2006 ===
- "After the Music Stops" - Lecrae
- "Kingdom People" - Tedashii
- "If They Only Knew" - Trip Lee
- "Chronicles (Greatest Hits, Vol. 1)" - The Cross Movement
- "WhyHipHop? 2K6" - Various Artists

=== 2007 ===
- "Everyday Process: The Process of Illumination & Elimination" - Everyday Process
- "Our World: Fallen" - FLAME
- "13 Letters" - 116 Clique
- "HIStory: Our Place In His Story" - The Cross Movement
- "Open Book" - Da’ T.R.U.T.H.
- "Turn My Life Up" - Sho Baraka
- "Life by Stereo" - J.R.

=== 2008 ===
- "Our World: Redeemed" - FLAME
- "Chronicles of an X-Hustler" - Thi'sl
- "Life On Life" - Json
- "20/20" - Trip Lee
- "Rebel" - Lecrae
- "SoapBox" - R-Swift
- "The Chop Chop" - The Ambassador

=== 2009 ===
"A Different World" - Rio a.k.a. KuntryBoyy

"Focus EP" - Jai

=== 2010 ===
- "Between Two Worlds" - Trip Lee
- "Rehab" - Lecrae

=== 2011 ===
- "The Whole Truth" - Da' T.R.U.T.H.
- "Culture Shock" - Jai
- "Murray's Grammar: New Rules" - J.R.

=== 2012 ===
- "Gravity" - Lecrae
- "High Society Collective" - High Society Collective (Courtney Orlando, Sho Baraka, Swoope, Natalie Lauren)

=== 2013 ===
- "ATLast" - Alex Faith

=== 2015 ===
- "Bloodlines" - Alex Faith
