= The Good Life (Trip Lee album) =

Studio album by Trip Lee
- Released: April 10, 2012
- Genre: Christian hip hop
- Length: 61:36
- Label: Reach
- Producers: G-Styles, Dirty Rice, CJ Luzi, Alex Medina, Swoope, D-Flow (TheBrassman), Joseph Prielozny, Andre Atkins, Mark Mims, Maurice Tonia, Sharif Chauncey, Mushran Johnson, Ndelible & Tony Stone

Trip Lee chronology
Between Two Worlds (2010)	The Good Life (2012)	Rise (2014)

Professional ratings
Review scores
Source	Rating
Jesus Freak Hideout	4.5/5 stars
Hype Radio Network	Positive
Rapzilla	4/5 stars
DaSouth	3/5 stars

The Good Life is the fourth studio album from Christian rap artist Trip Lee. The album was released in 2012, through Reach Records. The album includes features from Lecrae, Andy Mineo, KB, and Jimmy Needham, among others. Four singles were released for the album, "One Sixteen (featuring Andy Mineo and KB)", "I'm Good (featuring Lecrae)", "Fallin' (featuring J. Paul)", and "Robot". Three promotional music videos were released for the album for three of the four singles, "I'm Good", "Fallin", and "One Sixteen". It was released to critical acclaim, with critics praising Trip's flow, pop-style hooks, high-quality beats, moody electronics, and lyricism.

== Sales ==
The Good Life debuted at No. 17 on the Billboard 200 with first-week sales of over 22,000 units, making it the sixth-highest charting Christian Hip Hop Album of all-time (tied with Tedashii's Below Paradise).

== Book and further promotional material ==
To further elaborate on his ideas, on September 20, 2012 Lee wrote and released a book with the same title to accompany the album. It has a foreword by Matt Chandler. To accompany the book, Lee released a remix of "Robot", and "I'm Good," as well as a new song, "Tell It".

== Track listing ==
No.	Title	Writer(s)	Producer(s)	Length
1.	"New Dreams" (featuring Sho Baraka, J.R.)	William L. Barefield III, Amisho Lewis, Michael Jamal Jefferson, Derrick Omondi Okoth, Ronald Hill II, Gabriel Azucena	G-Styles	4:03
2.	"Robot"	W. Barefield, Kenneth Chris Mackey	Dirty Rice	3:34
3.	"I'm Good" (featuring Lecrae and Natalie Lauren (uncredited))	W. Barefield, Lecrae, Moore, Carl Justin Luzi	CJ Luzi	4:25
4.	"War"	W. Barefield, Natalie Sims, Alex Medina, Allen Swoope, Dustin Kensrue	Alex Medina, Swoope	4:25
5.	"Fallin'" (featuring J. Paul)	W. Barefield, N. Sims, K. C. Mackey, Joseph Prielozny	Dirty Rice and Joseph Prielozny	3:54
6.	"iLove" ((featuring Jessica Barefield- uncredited))	W. Barefield, A. Medina, Abraham Olaleye, J. Prielozny	Dirty Rice, D-Flow, Joseph Prielozny	3:06
7.	"Know Me"	W. Barefield, K. C. Mackey, Kenneth Gamble, Leon Huff	Dirty Rice	3:46
8.	"One Sixteen" (featuring KB, Andy Mineo)	W. Barefield, Kevin Elijah Burgess, Andrew Mineo, Andre Atkinson, Mark Mims, Sharif Chauncey, Alex Medina	Andre Atkinson, Mark Mims, Maurice Tonia, Sharif Chauncey, Mushran Johnson, Alex Medina	4:06
9.	"Heart Problem"	W. Barefield, G. Azucena	G-Styles	3:55
10.	"Take Me There" (featuring Jimmy Needham)	W. Barefield, K. C. Mackey, Jimmy Needham	Dirty Rice	3:48
11.	"Beautiful Life" (featuring V. Rose)	W. Barefield, N. Sims, K. C. Mackey, J. Prielozny	Joseph Prielozny, Dirty Rice	4:24
12.	"Fantasy" (featuring Natalie Lauren)	W. Barefield, N. Sims, K. C. Mackey, J. Prielozny	Joseph Prielozny, Dirty Rice	4:40
13.	"Love On Display" (featuring Andy Mineo)	W. Barefield, A. Mineo, A. Medina, J. Prielozny	Joseph Prielozny, Alex Medina	4:41
14.	"For My Good" (featuring Jai)	W. Barefield, Jaime Williams, G. Azucena	G-Styles	4:32
15.	"Good Thing" (featuring Leah Smith)	W. Barefield, Ndelible, Tony Shepherd, Leah Smith	Ndelible, Tony Stone	4:23
