= Rehab (Lecrae album) =

Studio album by Lecrae
- Released: September 28, 2010
- Recorded: 2009–2010
- Genres: Christian hip hop; Southern hip hop
- Length: 66:23
- Label: Reach Records
- Producers: PK; CheeseBeats; Benjah; Sky; Street Symphony; Alex Medina; G.P.; Kajmir Royale; Joseph Prielozny; Justin Boller; G. Roc; J.R.; GeeDa; Karac

Lecrae chronology
Rebel (2008)	Rehab (2010)	Rehab: The Overdose (2011)

Rehab is the fourth studio album by Christian hip hop artist Lecrae. It was released on September 28, 2010 on Reach Records. According to the Reach Records website, the album's "motto" is "The Christian life is an entrance into rehab." Centered on release and freedoms from inhibiting addictions and habits, Rehab is a highly conceptual album. Rehab is nominated for the Grammy Award for Best Rock or Rap Gospel Album at the 53rd Grammy Awards. The album was named the Best Album of 2010 in the "Best of 2010: Rapzilla.com's Staff Picks" awards, and Lecrae was also named Artist of the Year. The song "Background" and the album itself were nominated for Rap/Hip Hop Recorded Song of the Year and Rap/Hip Hop Album of the Year, respectively, at the 42nd Annual GMA Dove Awards.

== Background ==
In early 2010, Lecrae had been planning to name his next project "Rehab" although he had doubts about the name, mainly because Eminem released an album of a similar title. Despite this, Lecrae stuck with the original name, because "it made too much sense to not move forward with it."

== Release and promotion ==
On August 3, 2010 Lecrae released "Amp It Up" on Rapzilla that features Tedashii. Originally thought to be the first single of Rehab, Lecrae stated that it is a theme song for a Christian camp called Kanakuk Kamps. A video was posted via Rapzilla on August 19, 2010 of Lecrae rapping a verse from the song "Walking on Water".

According to Lecrae's blog, he will be in Southern Sudan at the time of the album's release so the "distractions of my life are stripped away and I'm left to focus on Jesus and his mission." He states that he won't be looking at the iTunes Store charts on which his album will be. On his blog he encourages his fans to not only buy his album, but asks them to donate to causes in Sudan and provides a link for them to do so.

On September 22, 2010 Rapzilla reported that the Rehab packaging comes with an advertisement that directs buyers to purchase Rehab: The Overdose to be released on January 11, 2011, called . The whole Rehab album was revealed via a listening session on September 26, 2010 on Rapzilla. Lecrae also talks on the video about the concept of the album. The tracks "High", "Just Like You" and "Children of the Light" have been released as digital download singles on the iTunes Store.

== Content ==
The opening track on the album, "Check In", is simply about Christian "checking in" to "rehab" and introduces the album's concept. Track two, "Killa", is about how there are always two "women" luring humans—one is foolishness and one is wisdom (Lecrae references Proverbs 5, 8 and 9). In "Killa", Lecrae explains how foolishness will "destroy you". "Divine Intervention" is about the need for someone to intervene in addicts' lives to tell them that their actions affect others detrimentally. "Just Like You", one of the album's singles, is about how we all model our life after someone and conveys the artist's desire to be modeled after Jesus Christ.

== Reception ==
=== Critical ===
Professional ratings
Review scores
Source	Rating
AllMusic	4/5 stars
CCM Magazine	4/5 stars
Christian Music Zine	5/5 stars
Cross Rhythms	10/10
Jesus Freak Hideout	5/5 stars
Rapzilla	4.5/5 stars

Rehab received universally positive reviews. Rapzilla's Logan Remy gave Rehab a 4.5/5 rating, calling it "Lecrae's best project to date". He says "The introductory songs all the way to the ending is an incredible ride through the growth of Lecrae," and that "Lecrae is loud and clear in the music." DaSouth.com rated Rehab 4 stars out of 5. Michael Weaver of Jesus Freak Hideout rated the album 5/5 stars, expressing high acclaim for it. He says, "Rehab is a fantastic album and is easily Lecrae's best to date, even topping Rebel. Lecrae is able to show that he is the best and most diverse rapper around." The review suggests to people who rarely listen to hip hop to get this album, even going as far as saying, "This is hip hop perfection." The music website AllMusic gave Rehab 4 of out 5 stars. He explains to readers that Rehab "begins with a Christian checking in to rehab and then, through a series of well-written, well-produced songs, tells the story of how he got there."

=== Commercial ===
The album debuted at No. 17 on the Billboard 200. Rapzilla reported that the debut week sales for Rehab were 25,864 units, about 15,000 more than Lecrae's previous album, Rebel. HipHopDX reported this figure at approximately 28,000 units, ahead of Ice Cube's I Am the West which was released on the same day. As of October 26, 2011, the album has sold 124,000 copies sold in the United States.

== Awards ==
The album was nominated for a Dove Award for Rap/Hip-Hop Album of the Year at the 42nd GMA Dove Awards, while the song "Background" was nominated for Rap/Hip-Hop Recorded Song of the Year. The album was nominated for Best Rock or Rap Gospel Album at the 53rd Grammy Awards.

== Track listing ==
Standard edition

No.	Title	Writer(s)	Producer(s)	Length
1.	"Check In"	Moore; Harris; Montgomery	PK	2:40
2.	"Killa"	Moore; Sims	CheeseBeats	3:28
3.	"Divine Intervention" (featuring J.R.)	Moore; Peebles	J.R.	3:51
4.	"Just Like You" (featuring J. Paul)	Moore; Morris; Peebles; Foster; Amos	J.R.	5:16
5.	"Gotta Know" (featuring Benjah)	Moore; Boller; Thom	Benjah; Sky	4:12
6.	"Used to Do It Too" (featuring KB)	Moore; Burgess; Montgomery; Harris	PK	3:56
7.	"Children of the Light" (featuring Sonny Sandoval of P.O.D. and Dillavou)	Moore; Sandoval; Dillavou; Thom	Benjah	3:33
8.	"High" (featuring Sho Baraka and Suzy Rock)	Moore; Lewis	CheeseBeats	3:45
9.	"New Shalom" (featuring PRo)	Moore; Johnson; Esmond	Street Symphony	4:22
10.	"40 Deep" (featuring Trip Lee and Tedashii)	Moore; Barefield; Anderson	CheeseBeats	4:18
11.	"Walking on Water"	Moore; Harris; Montgomery; Fears	PK	3:41
12.	"God is Enough" (featuring FLAME and Jai)	Moore; Gray; Gaskin; Williams	Kajmir Royale	3:55
13.	"Boasting" (featuring Anthony Evans)	Moore; Cobbins	CheeseBeats	3:46
14.	"Background" (featuring C-Lite)	Moore; Medina; Mineo; Prielozny; Ramirez	Alex Medina; Joseph Prielozny; G.Roc	4:39
15.	"New Reality" (featuring Chinua Hawk)	Moore; Abramsamadu	G.P.	4:08
16.	"Release Date" (featuring Chris Lee)	Moore; Cobbins	CheeseBeats	3:34
17.	"I Love You" (featuring Chris Lee) (bonus track)	Moore; Cobbins; Gaskin	Kajmir Royale	3:17

Deluxe edition

Rehab: The Overdose (disc 2)
No.	Title	Writer(s)	Producer(s)	Length
1.	"Overdose"	L. Moore; T. Esmond	Street Symphony	2:56
2.	"More"	L. Moore; M. Jackson	Kadence for ATP	4:35
3.	"Battle Song" (featuring Suzy Rock)	L. Moore; N. Sims; T. Shepherd	Tony Stone	3:45
4.	"Anger Management" (featuring Thi'sl)	L. Moore; T. Tyler; A. Olaleye	D-Flow (Thebrassman)	4:56
5.	"Blow Your High" (featuring Canon)	L. Moore; A. McCain; T. Esmond; C. Dunlap	Street Symphony; Dunlap Exclusive	3:29
6.	"Strung Out"	L. Moore; J. Williams	CheeseBeats	3:59
7.	"Chase That Intro"	D. Lukasiewicz; J. Prielozny	Joseph Prielozny	0:44
8.	"Chase That (Ambition)"	L. Moore; B. Taylor; M. Montgomery; W. Harris	PK	3:45
9.	"The Good Life" (featuring J. Paul)	L. Moore; L. Rouser; C. Cobbins; H. Hall; N. Chu; J. Prielozny	DJ Official	4:36
10.	"Like That"	L. Moore; J. Williams	CheeseBeats	3:47
11.	"Going In" (featuring Swoope)	L. Moore; A. Swoope; N. Chu	DJ Official	4:31

Deluxe edition bonus tracks
No.	Title	Writer(s)	Producer(s)	Length
12.	"Hallelujah"	Lecrae Moore; Travis Tyler	GeeDa	3:42
13.	"Wish It Wasn't True"	Lecrae Moore; Elvin Shahbazian	Wit	4:12
14.	"Jesus Muzik (Dubstep Remix)"	Lecrae Moore; William Barefield	Karac	4:11

Target bonus tracks
No.	Title	Writer(s)	Producer(s)	Length
15.	"Finally Free" (featuring J. Paul)	Lecrae Moore; Jared Foster; Joseph Prielozny	Joseph Prielozny	4:03
16.	"Hope" (featuring Coffee)	Lecrae Moore; Cofféy Anderson		3:26

== Personnel ==
Credits adapted from AllMusic.

- Benjamin "Benjah" Leroy Thom – guitar, keyboards, producer, vocals
- Ford Clay – guitar
- Jeff Carruth – drums
- Cheesebeats – mixing, producer, vocal arrangement
- Silent – mixing
- Chris Lee Cobbins – engineer, vocals
- David Davidson – strings
- Jonpaul Douglass – inside photo
- Torrance "Street Symphony" Esmond – producer
- Tina Fears – vocals
- Marcus "FLAME" Gray – engineer
- Haley Hunt – vocals
- Derek "PRo" Johnson – engineer
- Kajmir Royale – producer
- Carlton Lynn – engineer, mixing
- Alex Medina – producer
- Andy Mineo – engineer
- Jacob "Biz" Morris – engineer
- Jon "JP" Parker – engineer
- Pastor AD3 – engineer
- Courtney Peebles – engineer
- Joseph Prielozny – engineer, acoustic guitar, producer
- Shane Ries – engineer
- Natalie Sims – vocals
- So Sakryfycial – engineer
- Supa Mario – engineer
- Zach Wolfe – cover photo

== Charts ==
Chart	Position
U.S. Billboard 200	17
U.S. Billboard Top Gospel Albums	1
U.S. Billboard Top Christian Albums	1
U.S. Billboard Top Independent Albums	1
U.S. Billboard Top Rap Albums	5

=== Song charts ===
Title	Chart	Position	Week
"Background"	U.S. Billboard Christian Songs	39	May 12, 2012
