= Rehab: The Overdose =

Studio album by Lecrae
- Released: January 11, 2011
- Recorded: 2010
- Genre: Christian hip-hop
- Length: 41:07
- Label: Reach Records
- Producer: Street Symphony; DJ Official; Joseph Prielozny; CheeseBeats; D-Flow (TheBrassMan); PK; Tony Stone; Kadence for ATP; Dunlap Exclusive

Lecrae chronology
Rehab (2010)	Rehab: The Overdose (2011)	Church Clothes (2012)

Rehab: The Overdose is the fifth studio album by Christian hip hop artist Lecrae. It was released on January 11, 2011, on Reach Records. The album is intended to be a direct follow up to Rehab (released only five months after Rehab), as Rehab is conceptually about the defeat of addiction while Rehab: The Overdose is about finding "grace, love, peace and hope" in Jesus (and thus "overdosing"). Some fans even consider it to be a part of Rehab.

== Background ==
A follow-up to Rehab was hinted on September 22, 2010, on Rapzilla that the Rehab packaging would come with an ad for a follow-up album to be released on January 11, 2011, to be called Rehab: The Overdose. The album was packaged with such an ad.

== Release and promotion ==
On Rapzilla the album cover and the track listing were released. Both are confirmed on the official site for Reach Records. On December 17, 2010, a promotional video was released for Rehab: The Overdose.

The first single off Rehab: The Overdose, titled "Overdose", was released to iTunes on December 21, 2010.

A preview listening session for the album was released on Rapzilla one day prior to the album's commercial release.

== Reception ==
=== Commercial ===
The album debuted at No. 15 on the Billboard 200 with first week sales of the album totaled at 21,204 units, and that was enough for it to top the Christian Albums chart.

=== Critical ===
Professional ratings
Review scores
Source	Rating
AllMusic	3.5/5 stars
DaSouth	4/5 stars
Jesus Freak Hideout	4/5 stars
Rapzilla	4/5 stars

Allmusic rated the album three-and-a-half stars out of five, calling the release a "high-quality set of tracks, just ones that didn’t make it on his 2010 album Rehab." The reviewer tells listeners to "expect the same intense worship and wordplay, but this time with fewer guests, a little less polish, and rough transitions from track to track," but recommends the album "for anyone who devoured the Grammy-nominated Rehab."

DaSouth rated Rehab: The Overdose four out of five stars, generally praising the album. Though "some tracks feel like they could be leftovers from that album ('Anger Management', 'Strung Out') ... they still find a way to fit into the OD [Overdose] theme," according to DaSouth. They said the album was "very much Biblical," "featuring a few gritty songs plus a handful of laid back ones," and it "starts the year 2011 off well."

Jesus Freak Hideout also rated the album four out of five stars, calling it "another solid Lecrae release" yet classifying it as "the most mainstream sound Lecrae has attempted" which "can also be said somewhat about his lyrics." The website does note that "the lyrics are still in-your-face-Gospel and they are in no way watered-down." It commends in particular the tracks "Battle Song", "Anger Management", and "Like That"; the latter it claims "is quite possibly the most radio friendly song Lecrae has ever done." In conclusion, Jesus Freak Hideout calls the album "more than deserving of your attention."

Christian hip hop website Rapzilla again rated Rehab: The Overdose four out of five stars, yet it seemingly praises all aspects of the album. Lecrae's 2011 solo album "invite[s] listeners into another round of musical therapy," referencing the conceptual metaphor of the Christian life being a rehabilitation process that "begins detoxing [Christians] from the things of this world." A trending suggestion throughout the review is that Lecrae sticks closer to his concept in Rehab: The Overdose compared to its prequel Rehab as the reviewer believes that "listeners who complained about the lack of theme-driven songs or the musically-schizophrenic nature of Rehab will be overjoyed by the sonic and thematic cohesiveness of Rehab: The Overdose," and claims that "the first thing the listener will notice is that this album is thematically much more cohesive than its predecessor [Rehab]." The review also notes Lecrae's development as a lyricist, specifically commending the songs "Overdose" ("which finds Lecrae lyrically-fit"), "Battle Song" ("a stellar track ... where Lecrae spits ferociously"), "Chase That", and "Walking On Water" (which "features an especially ridiculous flow and rhyme scheme from Crae"). In conclusion, Rapzilla calls the full album "much more than mere leftovers from Rehab; it is a fresh helping of Gospel-centered goodness that will keep listeners' palates satisfied for a long time to come."

== Track listing ==
No.	Title	Writer(s)	Producer(s)	Length
1.	"Overdose"	L. Moore; T. Esmond	Street Symphony	2:56
2.	"More"	L. Moore; M. Jackson	Kadence for ATP	4:35
3.	"Battle Song" (featuring Suzy Rock)	L. Moore, N. Sims; T. Shepherd	Tony Stone	3:45
4.	"Anger Management" (featuring Thi'sl)	L. Moore; T. Tyler; A. Olaleye	D-Flow (TheBrassMan)	4:56
5.	"Blow Your High" (featuring Canon)	L. Moore; A. McCain; T. Esmond; C. Dunlap	Street Symphony; Dunlap Exclusive	3:29
6.	"Strung Out"	L. Moore; J. Williams	CheeseBeats	3:59
7.	"Chase That (Ambition)"	L. Moore; B. Taylor; M. Montgomery; W. Harris	PK	4:29
8.	"The Good Life" (featuring J. Paul)	L. Moore; L. Rouser; C. Cobbins; H. Hall; N. Chu; J. Prielozny	DJ Official	4:36
9.	"Like That"	L. Moore; J. Williams	CheeseBeats	3:47
10.	"Going In" (featuring Swoope)	L. Moore; A. Swoope; N. Chu	DJ Official	4:31

== Charts ==
Chart	Position
U.S. Billboard 200	15
U.S. Billboard Christian Albums	1
U.S. Billboard Gospel Albums	1
U.S. Billboard Independent Albums	5
U.S. Billboard Rap Albums	4
