= King Kulture: Stop the Traffic =

Compilation album by Various Artists
- Released: August 27, 2013
- Recorded: 2012–2013
- Genre: Christian hip hop
- Length: 64:31
- Label: Rapzilla
- Producer: Alert312, Ali, Canton Jones, DeeOnTheTrack, Gawvi, Skrip, Spec, Tee-Wyla, Tyshane, Wit

King Kulture chronology
King Kulture (2012)	King Kulture: Stop the Traffic (2013)

Rapzilla Presents... King Kulture: Stop the Traffic is a compilation charity album from the Christian hip hop website Rapzilla, released on August 27, 2013. In partnership with Syntax Distribution, Rapzilla donated all proceeds from the album to Inter-Varsity's New York City Urban Project, a non-profit organization dedicated to stopping human trafficking in New York City. The project features contributions from emcee and production artists such as Andy Mineo, MC Jin, FLAME, Sho Baraka, Canton Jones, Wit, Propaganda, KIDD, Rhema Soul, and Gawvi, among others.

== Background ==
King Kulture: Stop the Traffic marks the second volume in the Rapzilla Presents... King Kulture series. The first, King Kulture, was released on January 31, 2012, to support the elementary school Ecole de la Borne in Kinshasa, Democratic Republic of the Congo. Featuring artists such as Lecrae, KJ-52, GRITS, Braille, Sho Baraka, and K-Drama, the project raised over $10,000 USD. Following the success of that release, Rapzilla announced on June 18, 2013 that it was releasing a new compilation, Rapzilla Presents... King Kulture: Stop the Traffic. This time, the proceeds will be directed to the New York City-based New York City Urban Project, which aims to halt human trafficking in the NYC-area.

== Promotion ==
Following its June announcement of the new compilation album, Rapzilla released the project's lead single, "First World Problems" by KIDD, on July 8, 2013. The next day, Rapzilla released a video in which Jonathan Walton of Inter-Varsity and NYCUP discussed the problem of human trafficking in the New York area. On July 23, 2013, Rapzilla co-owner Chad Horton announced the release of a second single, "Over the Edge" by MC Jin featuring Dawen, on AllHipHop. The third single for the album, "Rejuvenated" by Json featuring Future and Derek Minor, dropped on August 5, 2013. A music video for "Over the Edge" premiered on Hip Hop DX on August 13. The project's fourth single, "Rescue Me" by Butta P. featuring V. Rose, was released on August 17. The same day, Rapzilla released the titular single, "Stop the Traffic" by Andy Mineo featuring Co Campbell, exclusively for the website's app users. Two days later, Rapzilla made "Stop the Traffic" available for streaming by all users on their website.

== Track listing ==
No.	Title	Producer(s)	Length
1.	"First World Problems" (performed by KIDD)	Tyshane	2:20
2.	"Cashews" (performed by Flame)	DeeOnTheTrack, SPEC (post.)	4:04
3.	"Heart Murmurs" (performed by Alert312)	Alert312	3:59
4.	"Show Them" (performed by Skrip)	Skrip	3:56
5.	"We Win" (performed by Rhema Soul)	Wit	4:05
6.	"Over the Edge" (performed by MC Jin featuring Dawen)	Laine Hitz	3:43
7.	"First Date" (performed by Gowe)	Tee-Wyla	3:44
8.	"What Will it Take?" (performed by Janette... ikz)		10:02
9.	"Stop the Traffic" (performed by Andy Mineo featuring Co Campbell)	GAWVI	3:52
10.	"Rescue Me" (performed by Butta P. featuring V. Rose)	Tee-Wyla	4:22
11.	"Tomorrow" (performed by Sho Baraka featuring Ali)	Ali	3:09
12.	"Rejuvenated" (performed by Json featuring Future and Derek Minor)	DeeOnTheTrack, SPEC	3:32
13.	"Royalty" (performed by Young Chozen)	Tee-Wyla	3:12
14.	"Runway" (performed by Canton Jones)	Canton Jones	2:50
15.	"Not for Sale" (performed by HillaryJane)	Skrip	3:29
16.	"Healthy Don't Need Doctors" (performed by Propaganda)	Wit	4:12
Total length:			64:31

== Charts ==
Chart	Position
U.S. Billboard Gospel Albums	9
