= 20/20 (Trip Lee album) =

Studio album by Trip Lee
- Released: May 20, 2008
- Genre: Christian rap
- Label: Reach
- Producers: Joseph Prielozny, G-Styles, Rob Ghosh, DJ Official, J.R., Tony Stone, Augusta Mchendree

Trip Lee chronology
If They Only Knew (2006)	20/20 (2008)	Between Two Worlds (2010)

20/20 is the second studio album from Christian rap artist Trip Lee. The album was released in 2008, through Reach Records. The album debuted at No. 193 on the Billboard 200.

== Reception ==
The album received generally positive reviews; Trailblaza of Rapzilla had the following to say about the album. "Overall, this is a very solid sophomore release from Trip Lee and 20/20 definitely accomplishes its intended goal of seeing the Lord clearer. If you don't walk away from this album with 20/20 vision of our Lord, then you need to take your spiritual blinders off and listen to this album again."

== Track listing ==
All tracks are written by William Barefield, except where noted.

No.	Title	Writer(s)	Producer(s)	Length
1.	"20/20 Intro"		Mckendree Augustas, Joseph Prielozny, and DJ Official	1:58
2.	"Superstar (Eyes Off Me)"		G-Styles	3:45
3.	"Real Vision" (featuring Tedashii)	Tedashii Anderson, Barefield	G-Styles & DJ Essence	4:42
4.	"Inexhaustible"		Tony Stone	3:34
5.	"Who Is Like Him?"		G-Styles	4:43
6.	"We Told Em"		DJ Official	4:04
7.	"Cling To You" (featuring Shai Linne)	Barefield, Shai Linne	Tony Stone	4:15
8.	"Relief"		Rob Ghosh and Joseph Prielozny for Ghoshlozny Productions	4:18
9.	"Behold The Spirit" (featuring Tedashii)	Barefield, Courtney Peebles	G-Styles	5:10
10.	"Satisfaction (Hedonist)"	Barefield, Courtney Peebles	J.R.	4:31
11.	"Come Close" (featuring Flame and Sho Baraka)	Barefield, Amisho Lewis, Marcus T. Williams-Gray	DJ Official	4:32
12.	"Who He Is" (featuring Lecrae and Cam)	Barefield, Cameron Dukes, Lecrae Moore	G-Styles	4:10
13.	"Intimacy" (featuring Diamone)	Barefield, Lewis	Tony Stone	4:45
14.	"True Security"		Rob Ghosh and Joseph Prielozny for Ghoshlozny Productions	4:53
15.	"Eyes Open" (featuring J.R.)	Barefield, Peebles	DJ Official	4:50
16.	"Hip Hop [Hidden track]"		DJ Official	4:02
