= Identity Crisis (Tedashii album) =

Studio album by Tedashii
- Released: May 26, 2009
- Recorded: 2008–2009
- Genre: Christian hip hop
- Length: 52:42
- Label: Reach
- Producer: Tony Stone, NAZ, Big Juice, BenJah, DJ Official, PRo, Joseph Prielozny, G-Styles, G.P., D Free, DJ PRUITT, K-Drama, Mchendree

Tedashii chronology
| Kingdom People (2006) | Identity Crisis (2009) | Blacklight (2011) |

Singles from Identity Crisis
- 1. "26's" 2. "I'm a Believer" Released: April 30, 2009

Professional ratings
Review scores
| Source | Rating |
|---|---|
| Allmusic | 3.5/5 stars |
| DaSouth.com | 4.5/5 stars |
| Holy Culture | 4.5/5 stars |
| Jesus Freak Hideout | 4/5 stars |
| Rapzilla | (Mixed) |

Identity Crisis is the second studio album by Christian rap artist, Tedashii. It was released on May 26, 2009 after being pushed back from its originally scheduled May 19, 2009 release date.

== Conception ==
=== Background ===
Tedashii based the title of the album on 1 Corinthians 15:10.

"But by the grace of God I am what I am, and his grace to me was not without effect."

== Release and promotion ==
The album, initially intended for a May 19, 2008 release date, was pushed back to May 26, 2009 by Reach Records. In order to make up for the delay, Reach Records made two left over tracks from the album freely available online.

The album's second single, "I'm a Believer", featuring label mate Trip Lee and Soyé was released on iTunes on April 30, 2009.

== Track listing ==
| No. | Title | Producer(s) | Length |
|---|---|---|---|
| 1. | "Identity Crisis Intro" | NAZ | 1:43 |
| 2. | "Work" | Big Juice | 4:02 |
| 3. | "26's Introduction" | BenJah | 0:28 |
| 4. | "26's" (featuring Lecrae) | NAZ | 5:13 |
| 5. | "Hollywood" (featuring Rozie Turner) | Dion "D Free" Burroughs | 4:27 |
| 6. | "Identity 1: We Fell" | DJ Official, Pro, D.J. PRUITT | 2:27 |
| 7. | "Make War" (featuring Flame) | K-Drama, MCHENDREE | 4:22 |
| 8. | "Gotta Believe" (featuring Diamone) | Tony Stone, Joseph Prielozny | 4:52 |
| 9. | "Identity 2: Adoption" (featuring Rick Trotter) | Dion "D Free" Burroughs | 3:48 |
| 10. | "I'm a Believer" (featuring Trip Lee and Soyé) | G.P. | 3:47 |
| 11. | "Fresh" | G-Styles | 3:16 |
| 12. | "Thank You" | G.P. | 4:03 |
| 13. | "All I Need" (featuring Chris Davis) | G.P. | 3:28 |
| 14. | "Identity 3: The Church" | DJ Official | 3:08 |
| 15. | "Community" (featuring Stephen the Levite and Sho Baraka) | DJ Official | 3:38 |

== Charts ==
| Chart | Position |
|---|---|
| U.S. Billboard 200 | 137 |
| U.S. Billboard Top Gospel Albums | 2 |
| U.S. Billboard Top Christian Albums | 10 |
| U.S. Billboard Top Christian & Gospel Albums | 10 |
| U.S. Billboard Top Independent Albums | 19 |
| U.S. Billboard Top Internet Albums | 137 |
