= Tony Stone (music producer) =

- Also known as: T Stone, Stiddone
- Born: Tony Shepherd; RAF Lakenheath, Lakenheath, Suffolk, England
- Origin: Nashville, Tennessee, U.S.
- Genres: Hip hop, Christian hip hop
- Occupations: Producer, project management, songwriter

Tony Stone (born 1982) is an American music producer and project developer for Christian hip hop artists. He has produced the music for hundreds of songs in the genre. He is currently the project manager for Reflection Music Group.

== Production discography ==
Production contributed to these albums

- After the Music Stops, Lecrae
- Rehab: The Overdose, Lecrae
- If They Only Knew, Trip Lee
- 20/20, Trip Lee
- Between Two Worlds, Trip Lee
- Kingdom People, Tedashii
- Identity Crisis, Tedashii
- Our World: Fallen, Flame
- Our World: Redeemed, Flame
- Captured, Flame
- 116 Compilation, 116 Clique
- 13 Letters, 116 Clique
- Turn My Life Up, Sho Baraka
- Chronicles, The Cross Movement
- Crime & Consequences, Phanatik
- The Chop Chop: From Milk to Meat, Ambassador
- Shades of Grey, Braille
- Box of Rhymes, Braille
- Heavy Rotation, Hiphop Is Music (Braille)
- Extra Credit, Theory Hazit
- Storiez, Shai Linne
- The Atonement, Shai Linne
- The Church (Compilation)
- The Big Picture, Da Truth
- Manumit, Dre Murray
- Revolutionary Theme Music, R-Swift
- Behind the Musik, KJ-52
- Five-Two Television, KJ-52
- Boggie Root, DJ Maj
- More Than Music, Promise
- Slow Burn, Sev Statik

== Awards and achievements ==
Award	Honor	Work	Status	Note	Ref
2006 GMA Dove Award	Rap/Hip Hop Album of the Year	Behind the Musik (KJ-52)	Won	contribution as work for hire, not as producer	
2007 GMA Dove Award	Rap/Hip Hop Album of the Year	After the Music Stops (Lecrae)	Nominated		
2007 Holy Hop Hop Honor Award			Won	Atlanta	
2007 Stellar Awards	Best Rap/Hip Hop Album	Taking the Gospel to the Streets Vol. 2 (Various Artists)	Nominated		
2010 Sphere of Hip-Hop	Producer of the Year		Won		
2010 Stellar Awards	Best Rap/Hip Hop Album	The Big Picture (Da TRUTH)	Won		
2011 GMA Dove Award	Rap/Hip Hop Album of the Year	Between Two Worlds (Trip Lee)	Nominated		
2011 Stellar Awards	Best Rap/Hip Hop Album	Between Two Worlds (Trip Lee)	Won		
2012 GMA Dove Award	Rap/Hip Hop Album of the Year	Rehab, the Overdose (Lecrae)	Won		
