= Between Two Worlds (Trip Lee album) =

Studio album by Trip Lee
- Released: June 22, 2010
- Recorded: 2009–2010
- Genre: Christian hip hop
- Length: 64:26
- Label: Reach
- Producer: G-Styles; Big Juice, J.R.; Alex Medina; CheeseBeats; Joseph Prielozny; DJ Official; Tony Stone; D Free; the Runners; Trip Lee; G. Roc

Trip Lee chronology
20/20 (2008)	Between Two Worlds (2010)	The Good Life (2012)

Singles from Between Two Worlds
- 1. "The Invasion (Hero)" Released: May 11, 2010; 2. "No Worries" Released: May 27, 2010

Between Two Worlds is the third studio album by Christian rapper, Trip Lee. The album was released on Reach Records on June 22, 2010.

Professional ratings
Review scores
Source	Rating
Allmusic	3.5/5 stars
DaSouth.com	4.5/5 stars
Jesus Freak Hideout	4/5 stars
Rapzilla	Favorable

== Reception ==
It is the first Christian rap album ever to go No. 1 on the Christian album chart beating out The Generous Mr. Lovewell by MercyMe. The album went on to be nominated for two Dove Awards and to win the Stellar Award for Best Hip Hop Album in 2011.

== Track listing ==
No.	Title	Producer(s)	Length
1.	"Real Life Music"	Joseph Prielozny and DJ Official	2:54
2.	"Snitch"	J.R.	4:06
3.	"Invade" (featuring J. Paul)	Joseph Prielozny, CheeseBeats, and DJ Official	4:00
4.	"Prognosis"	Joseph Prielozny and DJ Official	4:21
5.	"No Worries"	G Styles and Alex Medina	4:05
6.	"Covenant Eyes" (featuring PRo)	Tony Stone	3:55
7.	"Life 101" (featuring Chris Lee)	CheeseBeats	4:04
8.	"I Love Music" (featuring Sho Baraka)	Joseph Prielozny and DJ Official	4:10
9.	"Limitations" (featuring Leah Smith)	D Free	4:22
10.	"Yours to Own" (featuring Jimmy Needham)	G. Roc	4:03
11.	"Apathy (Interlude)"	Trip Lee	0:51
12.	"Twisted" (featuring Lecrae, PRo, and Thi'sl)	CheeseBeats	4:51
13.	"Bear With You" (featuring Tedashii)	G Styles	4:36
14.	"Show's Over" (featuring Mitch Parks of After Edmund)	Joseph Prielozny	4:25
15.	"The Invasion (Hero)" (featuring Jai)	The Runners, Alex Medina, Big Juice, and Joseph Prielozny	5:36
16.	"My Lord"	DJ Official	4:01
Total length:			1:04:26

== Awards ==
The album was nominated for a Dove Award for Rap/Hip-Hop Album of the Year at the 42nd GMA Dove Awards.

== Release history ==
Region	Date	Distributing Label
United States	June 22, 2010	Reach Records
United Kingdom	July 19, 2010	Kingsway Music
