= Rise (Trip Lee album) =

Studio album by Trip Lee
- Released: October 27, 2014
- Genre: Christian hip-hop
- Label: Reach
- Producer: Gawvi

Trip Lee chronology
The Good Life (2012)	Rise (2014)	The Waiting Room (2016)

Rise is the fifth studio album from Christian rap artist Trip Lee. The album was released in 2014, through Reach Records. The album includes features from Lecrae, Andy Mineo, and This'l among others. Four singles were released for the album; "Shweet", "Sweet Victory", "Manolo" and "Beautiful Life 2 (Mine)".

== Concept ==
Trip Lee explained the concept of the album saying that; "It's a call-to-action to rise from the dead and actually live. We're born spiritually dead, and I'm calling for everyone to become spiritually alive. Secondly, don't wait until later to live the way you were created. God created you to honor Him, find joy, and serve others. Don't sleep on that. Lastly, rise above the low expectations people have."

== Promotion ==
In promotion of the album Reach Records held two listening sessions in New York City and Atlanta. Tickets went on sale and were held on September 23 and October 3 respectively.

In late December 2014, Gawvi, who produced the album, released two remixes of songs from the Rise album, one of "Lazarus" and another of "Sweet Victory" for free on SoundCloud. In January 2015, Trip Lee announced the Rise Tour which he'll be embarking on until August 2015 in support of the album.

=== Book ===
Trip Lee wrote a book titled Rise: Get Up and Live in God's Great Story to accompany the album. It was released on January 27, 2015.

== Critical reception ==
Professional ratings
Review scores
Source	Rating
CCM Magazine	4/5 stars
Indie Vision Music	5/5 stars
Jesus Freak Hideout	4/5 stars
New Release Tuesday	4.5/5 stars

Signaling in a four star out of five review by CCM Magazine, Andy Argyrakis recognizes, "Rapper Trip Lee comes out swinging for the fences on his fifth long player and, in the process, is even more apt to have his influence rub off on the world at large." Michael Weaver, agrees it is a four star album for Jesus Freak Hideout, responding, "Musically more diverse than any of his previous works, Rise is just another example of Trip Lee growing and challenging himself as an artist." Adding a half star to his rating compared to the aforementioned, New Release Tuesday's Mark Ryan, realizing, "This album is brilliant. From top to bottom, each track keeps you on the edge of your seat, and on each listen you will hear something new" Anthony Peronto, indicating it is a five star project from Indie Vision Music, replies, "In what could be his last album, Trip Lee’s artistry and perseverance are present in every Gawvi-produced song."

== Commercial performance ==
Rise debuted at No. 16 on the Billboard 200 with first-week sales of approximately 23,000 units, making it the fifth-highest charting Christian Hip Hop Album of all-time, as well as Trip Lee's highest charting album of his career.

== Track listing ==
No.	Title	Writer(s)	Producer(s)	Length
1.	"Rise"	William Barefield, Gabriel Azucena	Gawvi
2.	"Lights On" (with Leah Smith- uncredited)	W. Barefield, G. Azucena	Gawvi, with post prod. by Jacob "Biz" Morris
3.	"Shweet"	W. Barefield, Jamaal "Elhae" Jones, G. Azucena	Gawvi, with post prod. by Jacob "Biz" Morris
4.	"Manolo" (featuring Lecrae)	W. Barefield, Lecrae Moore, J. Jones, G. Azucena	Gawvi, with post prod. by Jacob "Biz" Morris
5.	"You Don't Know"	W. Barefield, J. Jones, G. Azucena	Gawvi
6.	"All Rise Up (Interlude)"		Gawvi, Jonathan Barahona
7.	"All Rise Up"	W. Barefield, G. Azucena	Gawvi
8.	"Beautiful Life 2 (Mine)" (with Dimitri McDowell, uncredited)	W. Barefield, Dimitri McDowell, G. Azucena	Gawvi, add. prod. by Elhae
9.	"Insomniac" (featuring Andy Mineo, with Melanie Segura & Rebbeca Folkes, uncredited)	W. Barefield, Andy Mineo, Natalie Sims, G. Azucena	Gawvi, with post prod. by Jacob "Biz" Morris
10.	"Something New"	W. Barefield, G. Azucena	Gawvi
11.	"Lazarus" (featuring Thi'sl)	W. Barefield, Travis Tyler, G. Azucena	Gawvi, with post prod. by Jacob "Biz" Morris
12.	"All My Love" (featuring Natalie Lauren)	W. Barefield, N. Sims, G. Azucena	Gawvi
13.	"I'm Gone" (with Gawvi and Elhae, uncredited)	W. Barefield, G. Azucena	Gawvi, Alex Medina
14.	"Sweet Victory" (featuring Dimitri McDowell and Leah Smith)	W. Barefield, D. McDowell, N. Sims, G. Azucena, Joseph Prielozny	Gawvi
