= Blacklight (Tedashii album) =

Studio album by Tedashii
- Released: May 30, 2011
- Recorded: 2010
- Genre: Christian hip hop
- Length: 52:42
- Label: Reach
- Producer: Benjah, Cheesebeats, D.J. Official, GeeDA, PRo, Sky, Street Symphony, PK

Tedashii chronology
Identity Crisis (2009)	Blacklight (2011)	Below Paradise (2014)

Singles from Blacklight
- 1. "Need It Daily" Released: March 15, 2011; 2. "Riot" Released: May 3, 2011

Professional ratings
Review scores
Source	Rating
Allmusic	4/5 stars
Christian Music Zine	5/5 stars
Jesus Freak Hideout	3.5/5 stars
New Release Tuesday	5/5 stars
Rapzilla	4/5 stars

Blacklight is the third studio album by Christian rap artist, Tedashii on Reach Records. It was released on iTunes on May 24, 2011, and in stores on May 31, 2011. The album produced singles "Need It Daily" (which later became a music video) and "Riot". The song "Last Goodbye" was made into a music video which was released on May 30, the day after Memorial Day.

== Theme ==
According to the official online release, Tedashii did this album with the intent of speaking to "the hearts of believers with the hope of eternity spent with Christ, no longer living in guilt for what has been uncovered in our lives", as found in 2Corinthians 4:16–17. The release ends with the statement: "We can and should live with the end in mind."

== Track listing ==
No.	Title	Writer(s)	Producer(s)	Length
1.	"Riot"	Tedashii Anderson, Derek "PRo" Johnson	PRo	3:12
2.	"Rock a Bye Baby"	Anderson, Medina, Prielozny	Alex Medina, Joseph Prielozny	3:16
3.	"Need It Daily" (featuring PRo)	Anderson, Charles "GeeDA" Cornelius, Johnson	GeeDA	3:28
4.	"Can't Get with You"	Anderson, Johnson, Prielozny	PRo, Joseph Prielozny	3:30
5.	"That Will Be the Day" (featuring Jenny Norlin)	Anderson, Jenny Norlin, Natalie Sims, John Williams	CheeseBeats	3:52
6.	"This Is the Life" (featuring Sho Baraka, L2)	Anderson, Burroughs, Amisho "Sho Baraka" Lewis, Lester Shaw	Dion "DFREE" Burroughs	4:38
7.	"Last Goodbye" (featuring Benjah)	Anderson, Justin Boller, Benjamin "Benjah" Leroy Thom	Benjah, Sky	3:50
8.	"He Lives" (featuring FLAME, Jai)	Anderson, Burroughs, Marcus "FLAME" Gray, Jaime "Jai" Williams	Dion "DFREE" Burroughs	4:44
9.	"Go Until I'm Gone" (featuring Thi'sl)	Anderson, Torrance Esmond, Lecrae Moore, Travis Tyler, Dunlap Exclusive	Street Symphony	3:26
10.	"Get Up" (featuring S.O.)	Tedashii Anderson, Oluwaseun Otukpe, John Williams	CheeseBeats	4:21
11.	"Burn This House Down"	Tedashii Anderson, Johnson, Prielozny	PRo, Joseph Prielozny	3:39
12.	"Finally" (featuring Shane & Shane)	Anderson, Shane & Shane (Shane Barnard & Shane Everet), Nelson "D.J. Official" Chu, Prielozny	D.J. Official, Joseph Prielozny	3:42
13.	"You Know What It is" (featuring KB, PK)	Tedashii Anderson, Kevin "KB" Burgess, PK (Warren "Ace" Harris, Marlon "Motown" Montgomery, Brian "Finance" Taylor)	PK	3:41
14.	"Dum Dum" (featuring Lecrae)	Anderson, Charles "GeeDA" Cornelius, Moore	GeeDA	3:25
15.	"Reverse" (featuring Andy Mineo)	Anderson, Medina, Andy Mineo, Prielozny	Alex Medina, Joseph Prielozny	4:52
16.	"Bravo" (featuring J. Paul)	Anderson, Darius Casey, Phelan Johnson, John Williams	CheeseBeats	3:43
Total length:				61:19

== Charts ==
When it debuted on May 31, 2011, Blacklight reached No. 1 on the Christian Albums chart, No. 2 on the Gospel Albums chart, No. 8 on the Independent Albums chart, No. 9 on the Rap Albums chart, No. 11 on the Digital Albums chart, and No. 63 on the Billboard 200.
