= Rebel (Lecrae album) =

Studio album by Lecrae
- Released: September 30, 2008
- Genre: Christian hip hop; dirty south; gangsta rap
- Length: 64:02
- Label: Reach Records
- Producer: G-Styles; Kadence for ATP; K-Drama; Joseph Prielozny; Sixth Sense Music Productions; Dion (DFREE) Burroughs; Teddy P; Bobby Taylor; So Hot Productions (J.R. and NAB); Lecrae

Lecrae chronology
After the Music Stops (2006)	Rebel (2008)	Rehab (2010)

Rebel is the third studio album by Christian rap artist, Lecrae. The album was released by Reach Records on September 30, 2008. The album was nominated in the best Rap/Hip-Hop Album category at the 40th Annual GMA Dove Awards but lost to Group 1 Crew's Ordinary Dreamers.

== Background ==
Rebel is titled after Lecrae's encouragement to rebel against modern pop culture, also pointing out that Jesus Christ himself was a rebel. Lecrae has stated that the title of the album is both a noun and a verb. Rapzilla called the album "a verbal onslaught against the world's view on life in modern day culture."

=== Content ===
Lecrae tackles some important issues in Rebel. In the album's intro and title track, Lecrae says that Christians must rebel against the ways of the world. In "Don't Waste Your Life" featuring Dwayne Tryumf, the rapper talks about how worldly pursuits lead to only disappointment in life, and living to serve Jesus leads to happiness. In the song "Identity" featuring J.R. and Da' T.R.U.T.H., Lecrae deals with self-esteem and image issues in the global community, telling listeners that their worth comes from their relationship with the Lord Jesus Christ and not in material possessions. "Indwelling Sin" speaks on the battle between his flesh and his spirit in the form of a conversation with his sin. In "Fall Back" featuring Trip Lee, he speaks on guarding against the ideals of the world as portrayed in the media. In "Got Paper" he again attacks the perception that money is the ultimate goal in life and asserts that a relationship with Christ is greater than all of the riches of the world. In "The Bride", Lecrae exhorts listeners to love the church as Christ loves the church.

== Reception ==
Professional ratings
Review scores
Source	Rating
AllMusic	3.5/5 stars
CMCentral	4/5 stars
Cross Rhythms	10/10 stars
Indie Vision Music	4/5 stars
The Christian Manifesto	4/5
Jesus Freak Hideout	4.5/5 stars

=== Commercial ===
Rebel has been a commercial success, having sold over 15,000 copies shortly after its release (9,800 copies in its first week and 5,600 copies in its second week of release, excluding digital downloads) and debuting on eight Billboard music charts. The album debuted at No 60 on the Billboard 200 albums chart and is the first Lecrae album to do so. Rebel also debuted at No 1 on the Top Gospel Albums chart, outperforming his previous album, After the Music Stops, which only managed to peak at No 5 throughout its 100-week run on the chart. The album remained at the No 1 spot on the Top Gospel Albums chart for a second week, and was the first hip hop album to ever reach No. 1 on the chart. Rebel debuted at No 2 on Billboard's Top Christian Albums and Top Christian & Gospel Albums charts, respectively. The album secured the No 10 spot on the Top Independent Albums chart and held the No 15 spots equally on the Top Digital Albums and Top Internet Albums charts. Rebel also achieved a lower peak position of No 61 on the Billboard Comprehensive Albums chart.

According to the Nielsen SoundScan, a project specializing in the statistics of album sales, Rebel was the highest-selling Christian rap album in the weeks following its release. Rebel also maintained a six-week run on the iTunes Store's Top 10 most sold albums chart.

== Track listing ==
No.	Title	Music	Producer(s)	Length
1.	"Rebel Intro"		Joseph Prielozny and G-Styles	3:06
2.	"Don't Waste Your Life" (featuring Cam and Dwayne Tryumf)		Dion (DFREE) Burroughs	4:05
3.	"Go Hard" (featuring Tedashii)		Kadence for ATP	4:57
4.	"Identity" (featuring Da' T.R.U.T.H. and J.R.)		G-Styles	3:45
5.	"Indwelling Sin"		Dion (DFREE) Burroughs	3:45
6.	"Breathin' to Death"		G-Styles	4:07
7.	"Truth"		Teddy P	4:49
8.	"Desperate" (featuring Cam)		G-Styles	4:43
9.	"Change"	Bobby Taylor for 778 Music Group	Lecrae	4:06
10.	"Fall Back" (featuring Trip Lee)		G-Styles	4:27
11.	"Live Free" (featuring Sho Baraka and Jai)		J.R.	4:26
12.	"Got Paper"		K-Drama	4:20
13.	"I'm a Saint"		G-Styles	4:21
14.	"The Bride"		Battle Axe for Sixth Sense Music Productions	4:20
15.	"Beautiful Feet" (featuring Dawntoya)		J.R.	4:38
Total length:				64:02

== Charts ==
Chart	Position
U.S. Billboard 200	60
U.S. Billboard Top Gospel Albums	1
U.S. Billboard Top Christian Albums	2
U.S. Billboard Top Christian & Gospel Albums	2
U.S. Billboard Top Independent Albums	10
U.S. Billboard Top Digital Albums	15
U.S. Billboard Top Internet Albums	15
U.S. Billboard Comprehensive Albums	61

== Release history ==
Region	Date	Format	Label
United States	September 30, 2008	CD, digital download	Reach Records
United Kingdom	October 24, 2008	CD	Reach Records

== Awards ==
The album was nominated for a Dove Award for Rap/Hip-Hop Album of the Year at the 40th GMA Dove Awards.
