= Turn My Life Up =

Studio album by Sho Baraka
- Released: 20 November 2007
- Genre: Christian hip hop
- Label: Reach
- Producer: Lecrae, Bobby Taylor, DJ Official, BenJah, So Hot Productions

Sho Baraka chronology
Turn My Life Up (2007)	Lions and Liars (2010)

"Turn My Life Up" is the first studio album of the Christian rap artist, Sho Baraka. It was released through Reach Records and peaked at No. 43 on the Billboard Gospel album charts.

== Reception ==
WitWize of Rapzilla had the following to say about the album: "Overall I have to cast my lot for this disk. I had a few grievances, but through and through Sho Baraka puts his mark on the music scene with a hard hitting, non-compromising, non-cheesy, debut CD. The content keeps you thinking and the beats keep you bobbing. Respect to Reach Records for putting this out."

== Track listing ==
1. "Turn My Life Up" - 4:15
2. "Interlude: The Calling" - 0:30
3. "Music of Life" - 3:46
4. "Overrated" - 3:20
5. "Rebuild the City" (featuring Cam) - 3:55
6. "Maranatha" (featuring Tedashii & Json) - 4:38
7. "Saint" (featuring Cam and Dillon Chase) - 3:58
8. "Great Day II Die" (featuring Dillavou) - 4:41
9. "Catch Me at the Brook" (featuring Lecrae) - 3:43
10. "Higher Love" - 3:58
11. "Slow it Down (Simplify Your Life)" (featuring Trip Lee) - 3:28
12. "Oh My Lord" (featuring Mitchell Moore and Rick Trotter) - 4:55
13. "Love of My Life" - 3:16
14. "100" - 3:16
15. "GOD is Like/Who is Like GOD" (featuring Amen, Cheeks, James Roberson, Joe Surkamer, and Dhati Lewis) - 4:34
16. "Rescue Me/You are My Everything" (featuring Shanna Proctor and Keynon Akers) - 6:34
17. "Be Scientific" - 5:07

== Chart positions ==
Chart (2007)	Peak position
U.S. Billboard Gospel Albums	43
