= ELHAE =

American singer and songwriter (b. 1990)

- Born: Jamaal David Jones; August 24, 1990 (age 35); Minot, North Dakota, U.S.
- Origin: Warner Robins, Georgia, U.S. Savannah, Georgia, U.S.
- Genres: Alternative R&B; hip hop
- Occupations: Singer; songwriter; rapper
- Years active: 2013–present
- Label: Atlantic
- Website: www.elhae.com

Jamaal David Jones (born August 24, 1990), better known by his stage name ELHAE (pronounced "ɛl a", acronym for Every Life Has An Ending), is an American singer and songwriter. ELHAE was born in Minot, North Dakota, but moved around a lot as a child because his father was in the military. His family eventually settled in Warner Robins, GA and ELHAE spent the summers in Savannah, GA.

In 2015, he was nominated for two rap albums at the Dove Awards, with Andy Mineo's Uncomfortable and Tedashii's This Time Around for Rap / Hip Hop Album of the Year, being a joint winner with Andy's album.

== Discography ==
=== Albums ===
- All Have Fallen (2016)
- Trouble in Paradise (2019)

=== EPs ===
- Aura (2015)
- Aura II (2017)
- Aura III (2021)
- Forgotten Flowers (2023)
