= Lions and Liars =

Studio album by Sho Baraka
- Released: 30 March 2010
- Genre: Christian hip hop
- Label: Reach
- Producer: DJ Official, CheeseBeats, Alex Medina, G. Roc, Chike 'Beatz' Ojukwu, BenJah, Joseph Prielozny, Juice 2020, K-Drama

Sho Baraka chronology
Turn My Life Up (2007)	Lions and Liars (2010)	Talented 10th (2013)

Professional ratings
Review scores
Source	Rating
Christian Music Zine	(A+)

Lions and Liars is the second album released by the Christian rap artist, Sho Baraka released through Reach Records on March 30, 2010. The album sold 4,294 units in its first week. The bonus tracks are available on all copies of the album sold in stores, and are not exclusive to the deluxe edition.

== Track listing ==
No.	Title	Length
1.	"Extinction Intro"	3:44
2.	"Lion’s Anthem"	3:51
3.	"Famous (featuring Erica Cumbo)"	3:03
4.	"Shut Us Down (featuring Lecrae, After Edmund)"	3:33
5.	"We Can Be More (featuring J.R.)"	3:12
6.	"Mercy On Me (featuring Chinua Hawk)"	5:04
7.	"I’m Black (A word from Tom Ason)"	0:57
8.	"My Life (Nice Aim) (featuring PRo)"	4:01
9.	"Me, Myself and I"	3:18
10.	"Liar’s Anthem"	4:14
11.	"BOYS!!! (A word from Propaganda)"	1:29
12.	"Revolutionary Died (featuring Trip Lee)"	3:08
13.	"Oh Well"	3:51
14.	"The Rising (featuring Trip Lee, Erica Cumbo)"	4:15
15.	"I.T.W.N.O.I. (featuring Tedashii, R-Swift, Benjah, Honey LaRochelle)"	3:55
16.	"Half of Me (featuring McKendree Augustas, Muche)"	5:20
17.	"4ever Is 2morrow (featuring JAMM)"	4:30

Bonus Tracks
No.	Title	Length
18.	"Word"	3:43
19.	"Kobe Bryant On ’Em (featuring K-Drama)"	4:43
20.	"Feel So Alone (featuring BenJah, Miss LuLu, Conviction)"	5:09
21.	"I See The Lord (Remix) (featuring Quiana Fields)"	4:27
Total length:		79:27

== Chart positions ==
Chart (2010)	Peak position
U.S. Billboard 200	149
U.S. Billboard Christian Albums	10
U.S. Billboard Gospel Albums	3
U.S. Billboard Independent Albums	16
U.S. Billboard Rap Albums	15
