= Chronicles of an X-Hustler =

Studio album by Thi'sl
- Released: August 11, 2009
- Genre: Hip hop
- Length: 1:01:33
- Label: X-Hustler Music

Chronicles of an X-Hustler is the second album from the Christian hip hop rap artist Thi'sl. X-Hustler Music released this project on August 11, 2009.

== Reception ==
Signaling in an 8.8 star review by Cross Rap. Cross Rap realizes, "Looking for a dose of encouragement? Here it is. House of Refuge recognizes, I was left astounded listening to this Rap album of the year Stellar award nominated release. You can't help but replay the whole 16 track CD over and over again. Chronicles of an X-Hustler features unforgettable singles, hardcore street rhythms and rhymes, thought-provoking groovy tunes, and sheer brilliance!

Professional ratings
Review scores
Source	Rating
Cross Rap	8.8/10 stars
Cross Rhythms	9/10 stars

== Tracks ==
No.	Title	Length
1.	"Set the Scene: Birth"	1:05
2.	"I Hate You (Crack)"	4:26
3.	"Windows Down"	4:14
4.	"On My Grind"	4:21
5.	"Lifeline"	4:33
6.	"I Forgive You"	4:23
7.	"Baby Girl"	5:08
8.	"Urban Missionary"	5:04
9.	"Set the Scene: Lil Homie"	1:04
10.	"Picture on a Shirt"	4:23
11.	"Daddy Did Me"	4:52
12.	"Identity Shift (Brothers)"	3:14
13.	"You're the One"	4:42
14.	"Still Standing Here"	3:51
15.	"Set the Scene: Redemption"	1:02
16.	"I Ain't Turning Back"	5:18
Total length:		1:01:33
