= Rhema Soul =

American hip hop group

- Origin: Fort Lauderdale, Florida, U.S.
- Genres: Christian hip hop, urban contemporary gospel
- Years active: 2007–present
- Label: Good City
- Members: Butta-P; JuanLove; K-Nuff
- Website: rhemasoul.com

Rhema Soul, is an American Christian hip hop trio from Fort Lauderdale, Florida, consisting of Butta-P, JuanLove, and K-Nuff. They started as a band with the 2007 independent release Worn Soles. Good City Music released the trio's second album Dope Beats Good News: The EP in 2008, Fingerprints in 2010 and Red in 2012. The band collaborated with Gawvi on their fifth album Dope Beats, Good News Vol. 2, which was released by Good City Music on October 8, 2013. Each of the last three albums have charted with Billboard Top Gospel Albums.

== Early life ==
Rhema Soul are a South Florida-based Christian hip hop trio from Fort Lauderdale, Florida, who are Butta-P, JuanLove, and K-Nuff. Members K-Nuff and Juan Love were part of a rap group for two years prior to the group's formation. Butta P., married to K-Nuff, had a passion for music as well and the three decided to form a group.

== Music career ==
Rhema Soul started making music in 2007. They became signed to Good City Music after their 2007 independent release, Worn Soles. Good City Music released the trio's second album Dope Beats Good News: The EP on March 31, 2008, and their third album Fingerprints on March 30, 2010. Red, their fourth album, came out on March 27, 2012. The trio worked with Gawvi on their fifth album, Dope Beats, Good News Vol. 2, and co-released it with him through Good City Music on October 8, 2013. The last three albums charted on Billboard's Top Gospel Albums charts.

== Discography ==
=== Studio albums ===
List of studio albums, with selected chart positions
Title	Album details	Peak chart positions
Title	Album details	US Gos
Worn Soles	Released: October 2, 2007; Label: Rhema Soul; CD, digital download	–
Dope Beats Good News: The EP	Released: March 31, 2008; Label: Good City; CD, digital download	–
Fingerprints	Released: March 30, 2010; Label: Good City; CD, digital download	39
Red	Released: March 27, 2012; Label: Good City; CD, digital download	24
Dope Beats, Good News Vol. 2 (with Gawvi)	Released: October 8, 2013; Label: Good City; CD, digital download	31
