= This Time Around (EP) =

EP by Tedashii
- Released: March 4, 2016
- Genre: Christian hip hop
- Length: 24:09
- Label: Reach

Tedashii chronology
Below Paradise (2014)	This Time Around (2016)	Never Fold (2019)

Singles from This Time Around
- 1. "Jumped Out the Whip" Released: October 2015; 2. "I'm Good" Released: 2016

This Time Around is the second extended play from Tedashii. Reach Records released the EP on March 4, 2016.

== Critical reception ==
Professional ratings
Review scores
Source	Rating
The Christian Beat	3/5 stars
New Release Today	4.5/5 stars

Awarding the EP four and a half stars at New Release Today, Dwayne Lacy states, "(He loved) the ambition that Tedashii showed with this EP, taking risks that paid off! To see how Tedashii is still only getting better serves as a standard for artists, mainstream or underground, sacred or secular." Chris Major, giving the EP three stars from The Christian Beat, writes, "This Time Around under-delivers."

== Track listing ==
No.	Title	Length
1.	"This Time Around"	4:47
2.	"I Get It"	2:59
3.	"Jumped out the Whip"	4:07
4.	"Be Me"	3:30
5.	"In My Life"	1:49
6.	"808"	3:40
7.	"I'm Good"	3:17
Total length:		24:09

== Chart performance ==
Chart (2016)	Peak position
US Christian Albums (Billboard)	9
US Independent Albums (Billboard)	20
US Top Rap Albums (Billboard)	19
