= Below Paradise =

Studio album by Tedashii
- Released: May 27, 2014
- Genre: Christian hip hop
- Length: 49:58
- Label: Reach
- Producers: 808xElite, Andy Mineo, Black Knight, DeCapo Music Group, Dirty Rice, Dre "the Giant" Garcia, Gawvi, Halo Hitz, Jacob "Biz" Morris, Joseph Prielozny, Mashell, TOD, Uforo "Bongo" Ebong

Tedashii chronology
Blacklight (2011)	Below Paradise (2014)	This Time Around (2016)

Singles from Below Paradise
- 1. "Dark Days, Darker Nights" Released: 2014; 2. "Nothing I Can't Do" Released: 2014

Below Paradise is the fourth studio album from Christian hip hop recording artist Tedashii, released on May 27, 2014 by Reach Records. Based on his struggle to deal with the death of his son, the album tackles issues of pain, suffering, and the love of God in the midst of hardship. It met with a positive reception from music critics. The album sold 13,800 copies in its debut week causing it to chart at No. 17 on the Billboard 200.

== Background ==
This album was the follow-up to Tedashii's third studio album, Blacklight, released in 2011 by Reach Records. Below Paradise was released by the same label on May 27, 2014. The album was produced by 808xElite, Andy Mineo, Black Knight, DeCapo Music Group, Dirty Rice, Dre "the Giant" Garcia, Gawvi, Halo Hitz, Jacob "Biz" Morris, Joseph Prielozny, Mashell, TOD, and Uforo "Bongo" Ebong. Below Paradise was created after the death of Tedashii's young son in a car accident. Tedashii stated in a press release that

In March 2013 I had the worst day of my life. The loss of my son changed me forever. I experienced grief and sorrow to the depth of my soul. The veil was lifted, the smoke cleared and all I had was pain... ...The reality of being a Christian and suffering so harsh a thing was hard for me to grasp. This album is my journal shared publicly with everyone during this difficult journey as I worked to understand all I felt, experienced and believed. I am human, I am hurt, I am his. By his grace I am what I am. I pray this will be an album that all can feel, even if you can't relate, and be moved to true emotions about the reality of life in a harsh world with a loving God, below paradise.

== Music and lyrics ==
The album is described as an auditory journal that traces Tedashii's life over the last two years, from the death of his son, the strains this placed on his marriage, and the peace and grace he received from God throughout this time. In an interview with Reel Gospel, Tedashii explained that beyond dealing with suffering the album is also "a reflection on the fall, the result of the fall", and that the message that he is sharing on this album is that "We live in a fallen world with a loving God... Both are true, and to ignore one and only receive the other you dismiss how great a love God has for us." In addition, Mark Ryan of New Release Tuesday states that "The lyrics are personal, his flow is on point, the album's production values are not in question and each and every feature is perfectly placed and works brilliantly in this album."

== Critical reception ==
Professional ratings
Review scores
Source	Rating
AllMusic	3.5/5 stars
CCM Magazine	4/5 stars
Christian Music Review	5/5 stars
HM	4/5 stars
Indie Vision Music	4/5 stars
Jam the Hype	9.6/10
Jesus Freak Hideout	4/5 stars
New Release Tuesday	5/5 stars

Below Paradise met with positive reception from music critics. At CCM Magazine, Matt Conner rated the album four stars out of five, remarking how "Below Paradise, opens up both the hip-hop playbook and the artist's soul for a meaningful mix that's bound to find the rapper's biggest reach to date." In addition, Conner vows it is not the collaborators that will impact people first "it's Tedashii's vulnerable message and dynamic production". David Jeffries of AllMusic rated the album three-and-a-half stars, commenting how Tedashii comes with a "provocative and 'no apologies' stance in full effect, and when it comes to that hunger for change, few other artists can make it so palpable." At HM, Justin Mabee rated the album four stars out of five, stating how "Fans will flock and embrace the rapper after what he’s been through, and he’s able to offer them his best work, by far."

Mark Ryan of New Release Tuesday rated the album a perfect five stars, remarking how "This album is complete from start to finish." At Indie Vision Music, Anthony Peronto rated the album four stars out of five, writing that "For casual listeners who want only trap beats and catchy hooks, Below Paradise is bound to disappoint with its serious nature and soul-bearing transparency", but he says "Below Paradise is an encouraging album from beginning to end." Amanda Brogan of Christian Music Review rated the album a perfect five stars, highlighting how "it’s more than just a stellar hip-hop album" because the release contains "more than pulsing beats and cleverly-placed lyrics – although there’s plenty of that."

At Jesus Freak Hideout, main reviewer Michael Weaver, Mark Rice in his second opinion, and Kevin Hoskins in the 2 Cents review all rated the album four stars out of five. Weaver calls "Tedashii's return [...] a worthy one" because "Below Paradise is easily a record you can throw on and listen to from front to back." Rice notes the lyricism is "very heavy." Hoskins states how "rap heads will be blasting Below Paradise for a long time." Jeremy Hartman of Jam the Hype rated the album a 9.6 out of ten, highlighting how "Below Paradise is a powerful, soul-revealing album." At Wade-O Radio, Branden Murphy gave a positive review of the album, remarking how "Below Paradise was a great listen."

== Commercial performance ==
For the Billboard charting week of June 14, 2014, Below Paradise debuted at No. 17 on the Billboard 200, No. 2 and No. 1 on the Christian Albums and Top Gospel Albums charts, respectively, No. 2 on the Rap Albums chart, and No. 2 on the Independent Albums chart. In addition, the album sold 13,800 copies in its first week of sales.

== Track listing ==
Standard edition
No.	Title	Writer(s)	Producer(s)	Length
1.	"Below Paradise"	Tedashii Anderson, Andy Mineo, Joseph Prielozny, Tauren Wells	Joseph Prielozny	2:06
2.	"Perfect" (featuring Kam Parker)	T. Anderson, Darius Bryant, Kameron Glasper, Noah Nwachukwu	De-Capo Music Group for Vakseen LLC	3:34
3.	"Dark Days, Darker Nights" (featuring Britt Nicole)	T. Anderson, Clint Lightfoot, Natalie Sims	Halo Hits of Air Tight Productions	3:36
4.	"Nothing I Can't Do" (featuring Lecrae and Trip Lee)	T. Anderson, Gabriel Azucena, Jamal "Perfekt" James, Lecrae Moore	Gawvi	3:26
5.	"Catch Me if You Can" (featuring Andy Mineo)	T. Anderson, Chris Mackey, A. Mineo, J. Prielozny	Dirty Rice and Joseph Prielozny	4:29
6.	"Paradise" (featuring Tauren Wells of Royal Tailor)	T. Anderson, Dre "The Giant" Garcia, A. Mineo, T. Wells	Andy Mineo, co-produced by Dre "The Giant" Garcia for Odd Soul Creative	3:40
7.	"Fire Away" (featuring SPZRKT)	T. Anderson, Xavier Adams, Brandon Peavy	Black Knight Creationz	4:23
8.	"Be with You" (featuring Lester "L2" Shaw)	T. Anderson, Uforo "Taktix" Ebong, Torrance Esmond, Lester Shaw II	Uforo "Bongo" Ebong	5:03
9.	"Back to You (Interlude)" (with Jennifer Holm, uncredited)	T. Anderson, Jennifer Holm, C. Mackey	Dirty Rice and Joseph Prielozny	1:02
10.	"Angels and Demons" (featuring Crowder)	T. Anderson, Jeremy Ezell, Keith Cook, Jr., C. Mackey, J. Prielozny	Dirty Rice and Joseph Prielozny	4:34
11.	"My God"	T. Anderson, Jacob Morris, J. Prielozny, Tyshane Thompson	Jacob "Biz" Morris and Joseph Prielozny	3:00
12.	"Love Never Leaves" (featuring Natalie Lauren)	T. Anderson, C. Mackey, J. Prielozny, N. Sims	Dirty Rice and Joseph Prielozny	4:02
13.	"Complicated" (featuring Christon Gray)	T. Anderson, Serge Gustave, Mashell Leroy, Matt Massaro, T. Thompson	808 & Elite, Mashell, and TOD	3:34
14.	"Chase" (featuring Tim Halperin)	T. Anderson, C. Mackey, A. Mineo, J. Prielozny, T. Wells	Dirty Rice and Joseph Prielozny	3:29
Total length:				49:58

Deluxe edition
No.	Title	Writer(s)	Producer(s)	Length
15.	"Magic" (featuring Katt Rockell)	T. Anderson, Katrina Russ, Brian Reid, Jamal Thodat	Big Blizz, Young Focus	3:12
16.	"Earthquake" (featuring KB and Dimitri McDowell)	T. Anderson, Kevin Burgess, Dimitri McDowell, G. Azucena	GAWVI	3:22
17.	"On Ten" (featuring Derek Minor and Transparent)	T. Anderson, Derek Johnson, Jr., Dwight Taylor, Sr., L. Moore, J. James, Derrick Omondi Okoth	Derrick Omondi Okoth, Perfekt	3:48
Total length:				60:20

== Chart performance ==
Album

Chart (2014)	Peak position
US Billboard 200	17
US Top Christian Albums (Billboard)	2
US Top Gospel Albums (Billboard)	1
US Independent Albums (Billboard)	2
US Top Rap Albums (Billboard)	2
