= Thi'sl =

American rapper

- Also known as: Travis Tyler, Thi'sl
- Born: Travis Tremayne Tyler; March 17, 1977 (age 49); Greenwood, Mississippi, U.S.
- Origin: St. Louis, Missouri, U.S.
- Genres: Christian hip hop
- Occupations: Rapper; singer-songwriter; record producer
- Years active: 2007–present
- Labels: Reach; Full Ride Music Group
- Website: iamthisl.com

Travis Tremayne Tyler (born March 17, 1977), better known by the stage name Thi'sl, is an American Christian hip-hop musician from St. Louis, Missouri. In 2007, Thi'sl was signed to the record label X-Hustler, where he recorded three studio albums, After This House I Shall Live, Chronicles of an X-Hustler, and Beautiful Monster. In 2012, he was featured on Lecrae's Grammy-winning album Gravity .

== Biography ==
Travis Tremayne Tyler was born in Greenwood, Mississippi on March 17, 1977. As a baby, Thi'sl and his family moved to St. Louis, Missouri where at the age of 14, Thi'sl started rapping. Under the name Uncle Y, he recorded his first demo, however his album was influenced by the gang activity which he was involved in. After living and rapping about the street life, Thi'sl eventually straightened up his life and devoted it to positive rapping.

Thi'sl has been involved helping in the community of Ferguson, Missouri after the shooting of an 18-year-old man, Michael Brown. He recently addressed the public about justice issues in the St. Louis, Missouri area and he put together a peace response, calling out the community and church to take part in the healing of the community. On December 13, 2014, Thi'sl teamed up with Bubba Watson and donated $25,000 to repair vandalism and stolen technology at local Ferguson school Griffith Elementary. In 2018, he was robbed at gunpoint and shot.

== Discography ==
List of studio albums, with selected chart positions
Title	Album details	Peak chart positions			
Title	Album details	US	US Chr	US Gos	US Rap
Chronicles of an X-Hustler	Released: August 11, 2009; Label: Gozpul/X-Hustler; CD, digital download	–	–	23	–
Beautiful Monster	Released: July 26, 2011; Label: X-Hustler; CD, digital download	–	11	6	24
Free From the Trap	Released: November 20, 2012; Label: Daywind; CD, digital download	—	—	—	—
Fallen King	Released: May 6, 2014; Label: Full Ride; CD, digital download	115	11	4	11
Against All Odds	Released: March 22, 2016; Label: Full Ride; CD, digital download	—	44	—	—
Levitate	Released: August 11, 2017; Label: Full Ride; CD, digital download	—	—	—	—
STTAG	Released: October 25, 2019; Label: Full Ride; CD, digital download	—	—	—	—
