= DJ Official =

American DJ and producer (1976–2016)

- Born: Nelson J. Chu; September 16, 1976; Bronx, New York, U.S.
- Origin: Philadelphia, Pennsylvania, U.S.
- Died: August 14, 2016 (aged 39)
- Genres: Christian hip hop
- Occupations: DJ; record producer; songwriter
- Instrument: Turntables
- Years active: 1999–2016
- Labels: Reach; Cross Movement

Nelson J. Chu (September 16, 1976 – August 14, 2016), known professionally as DJ Official, was an American Christian hip hop DJ, record producer and songwriter. He was a member of the Christian hip hop collectives 116 Clique and The Cross Movement.

== Early life ==
DJ Official was born Nelson J. Chu, in The Bronx, on September 16, 1976. He lived in Brooklyn during his childhood and later in Amityville, Long Island.

== Career ==
DJ Official was a mentee of Hip hop artist Cipha Sounds in the mid-1990s, when both got out of high school. He was a member in the Christian hip hop collective 116 Clique. He released Entermission on December 29, 2009. It allowed him to crack the Billboard charts with his first album. Cross Rhythms rated the album a nine out of ten, and Rapzilla said "With Entermission DJ Official did much more than cement his legacy as a producer."

DJ Official was also a part of American-based Christian Hip Hop rap group The Cross Movement and collaborated with many other Cross Movement Records artist such as, Da TRUTH and Flame to name a few. He served (Cross Movement) faithfully as their DJ for eight years in the mid 1990s into early 2000s and has been a long time friend thereafter.

== Personal life ==
DJ Official was married to Teresa Chu (née Belvisi), and together they had two daughters, Isabella and Sophia. They resided together in Lancaster, Ohio.

== Death ==
Chu had a long-term battle with several health problems. On August 14, 2016, Chu died of complications following a double lung transplant.

== Discography ==
=== Studio albums ===
List of studio albums, with selected chart positions
Title	Album details	Peak chart positions	
Title	Album details	US Chr	US Gos
Entermission	Released: December 29, 2009; Label: Reach Records; CD, digital download	43	8

=== Extended plays ===
List of extended plays
Title	Album details
Gravity: The Remix EP (DJ Official and Alex Medina)	Remix of Gravity by Lecrae; Released: December 26, 2012; Label: Reach Records; Digital download
