= J.R. (musician) =

American Christian singer-songwriter (born 1979)

Courtney Orlando
- Born: Courtney Orlando Peebles; March 4, 1979 (age 46)
- Origin: St. Louis, Missouri, U.S.
- Genres: Christian; R&B; hip hop soul; pop; alternative; experimental
- Occupations: Singer-songwriter; producer
- Years active: 2003–present
- Labels: Cross Movement (2003–2009); High Society Collective (2011–)

Courtney Peebles (born March 4, 1979), better known as Courtney Orlando and formerly known as J.R., is an American singer and producer.

== Career ==
Orlando was formerly a Christian hip-hop singer signed to Cross Movement Records. He was also half of the So Hot Productions team along with N.A.B.

His debut album was Metamorphosis, released in 2005. Courtney often appeared on the hooks of songs by fellow labelmates, such as FLAME and Da' T.R.U.T.H. He was expected to release his second album, Life by Stereo, in September 2007; however, it was pushed back to December.

In 2009, Courtney left Cross Movement Records and went independent to work on a new sound. In September 2024, he announced his departure from Christianity.

== Discography ==
=== Studio albums ===
Year	Album
2005	Metamorphosis: Released: November 15, 2005
2007	Life by Stereo: Released: December 26, 2007

=== Mixtapes ===
- "Murray's Grammar: New Rules"
- Released: April 2011

=== Singles ===
- "Lights So Bright"
- "Always"

=== Music videos ===
- "Not a Slave"
- "Love"

=== With High Society ===
- Circa MMXI: The Collective (2012)

=== Guest appearances ===
- "Closer to You" by The Cross Movement
- "Cry No More" by The Cross Movement
- "N.F.L." by Da' T.R.U.T.H.
- "Open My Heart" by FLAME
- "On This Day" Gift Rap (Cross Movement album)
- "My Clothes, My Hair" by The Ambassador
- "2 Is Better" by Da' T.R.U.T.H.
- "Racial Diversity" by FLAME feat. Elinor
- "Wars of the Mind" by FLAME
- "Smile" by R-Swift
- "Grateful" by Lecrae
- "Lookin' For Love" by Trip Lee
- "Grace" by Json
- "Significance" by Tedashii
- "Hey Girl" by Everyday Process
- "Goodbye" by FLAME feat. Json
- "Joy to Me" by Thi'sl
- "Me on My SoapBox" by R-Swift
- "Eyes Open" by Trip Lee
- "Father in You" by Future
- "Flesh Killa" by Sean Slaughter
- "Love & Grace" by The Ambassador feat. Da' T.R.U.T.H.
- "Identity" by Lecrae feat. Da' T.R.U.T.H.
- "So Elektrik" by Rio
- "Calling You by KJ-52
- "Nothing Without You" by DJ Official feat. Lecrae
- "We Can Be More" by Sho Baraka
- "Divine Intervention" by Lecrae
- "Tonight (All of Me)" by FLAME
- "Parent Me" by Json
- "Secrets" by Json
- "Gravity" by Lecrae
- "Bloodlines" by Alex Faith
- "Never Land" by Andy Mineo
- "On My Mind" by Swoope
- "Freedom" by Alex Faith
- "No Rival" by Crowder
- "Activated" by Thi'sl
- "Sugar" by Thi'sl
- "Help Me Find My Way" by Thi'sl ft FLAME
- "Lean on Me" by Thi'sl
- "Brother" by Thi'sl
