= Gawvi =

American rapper

GAWVI
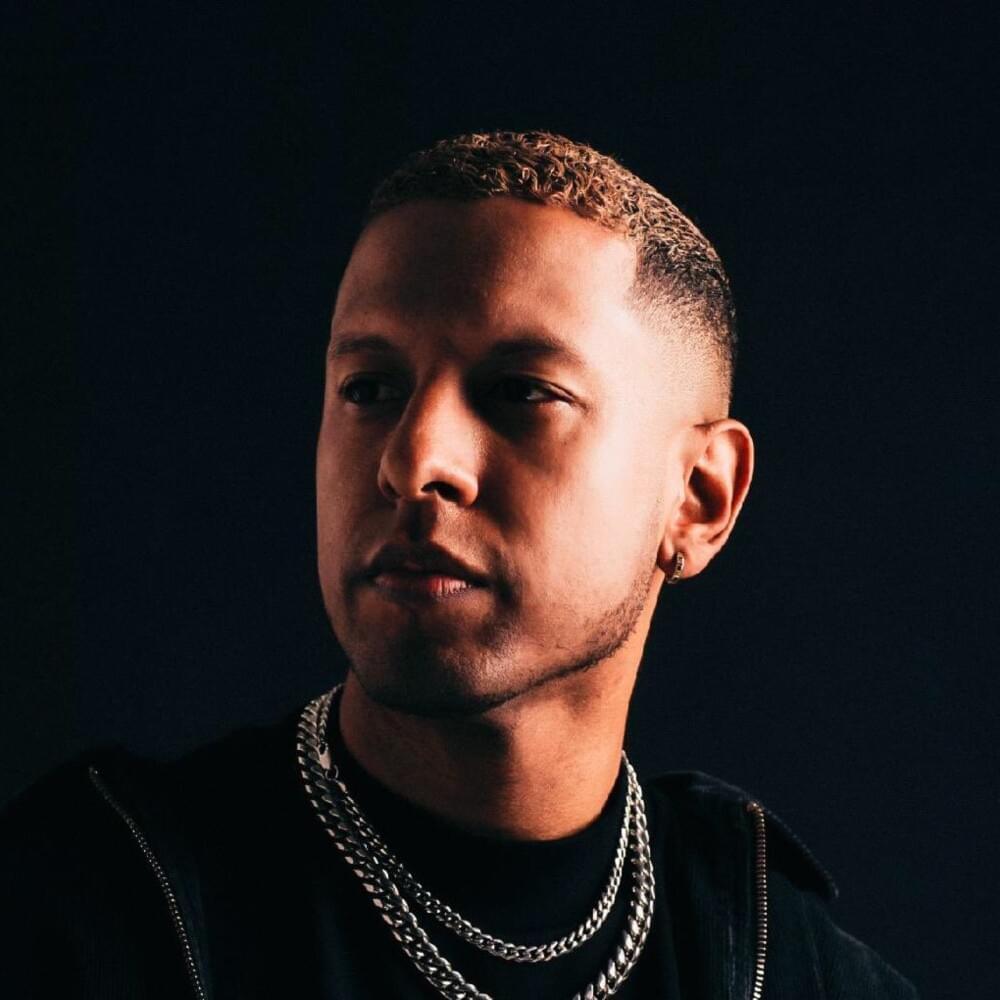
- Gawvi in a photo similar to his album cover of Heathen

Background information
- Also known as: G-Styles
- Born: Gabriel Alberto Azucena; September 23, 1988 (age 37); The Bronx, New York, U.S.
- Origin: Broward County, Florida, U.S.
- Genres: Hip hop; trap; CEDM; CCM; Christian rap
- Occupations: Singer; songwriter; rapper; music producer
- Instrument: Vocals
- Years active: 2008–Present

Gabriel Alberto Azucena (born September 23, 1988), who goes by the stage name GAWVI (formerly G-Styles), is an American Christian hip hop artist and music producer, formerly for Reach Records. Born in the Bronx, New York, he has released three extended plays, five albums, and twenty-three singles including his songs; "In the Water" and "Late Nights."

His career commenced in 2008, doing production work for Lecrae and Trip Lee, who continue to be his most consistent collaborators. In early 2016, he was officially signed to Reach Records. In early 2022, Reach ended their professional relationship with Gawvi after a sexual misconduct scandal.

== Personal life ==
Gawvi was born Gabriel Alberto Azucena, in The Bronx, New York, to a father from El Salvador and a mother from the Dominican Republic. He was raised in Miami, Florida.

He was married to Brianna Azucena. In January 2022 Gawvi announced that he had separated from her in 2020. Shortly after this announcement, the visual and musical artist Cataphant claimed on Twitter that he had allegedly sent unsolicited pictures of his genitalia to multiple women. Reach Records subsequently ended their professional relationship with him.

== Music career ==
=== Career beginnings, record producing, and Reach Records (2008–2015) ===
He started his music production career in 2008, most notably working with Lecrae and Trip Lee. His career led to him acquiring a recording contract with Reach Records as both an artist and in-house record producer. He won a GMA Dove Award at the 46th GMA Dove Awards in the category of Rap/Hip Hop Album of the Year, for his production work on Anomaly by Lecrae.

=== Lost in Hue, Holding Hue, We Belong, and 954 (2016–2017) ===
On July 29, 2016, Gawvi released his debut extended play Lost in Hue. Jesus Freak Hideout rated the E.P. (extended play) three out of five stars, claiming it to be a unique move made by Reach. Lost in Hue flew off the shelves, sitting at No. 1 on the iTunes top-selling dance albums chart. On September 9, 2016, Gawvi released his second extend play, Holding Hue, and was given a five-star rating by JFH's Liam Jackson, who said that "Free" featuring T-Jay was the only song that was "not that good.” On March 31, 2017, he released his debut studio album We Belong, to acclaim in the CCM (contemporary Christian music) community and debuting at No. 19 in iTunes. Gawvi received his second Dove Award in 2017 for his production on Trip Lee's album The Waiting Room.

=== PANORAMA, Heathen, and Noche Juvenil (2018–Early 2022) ===
Gawvi released his second album Panorama on October 17, 2018, featuring the song "Fight for Me" (with Lecrae), which won Rap/Hip Hop song of the year at the 50th GMA Dove Awards. On April 10, 2020, Gawvi released his third album, Heathen, which was nominated for Rap/Hip Hop album of the year at the 51st GMA Dove Awards. On March 26, 2021, Gawvi released his fourth full album, Noche Juvenil, which featured all songs recorded in Spanish, featuring Spanish-speaking artists from the Christian hip hop scene. On January 30, 2022, Reach Records ended their professional relationship with Gawvi.

=== ATMOSTFEAR (Late 2022-Present) ===
On October 9, 2022, Gawvi announced his next album Atmostfear. The album is currently scheduled for a 2023 release with the only known track being "Doors Down" with 1K Phew.

Gawvi released his fifth album "ATMOSTFEAR" on July 2, 2024 under the Alienz Alive label founded by Rodney "Darkchild" Jenkins. The album featured many styles ranging from hip-hop, dance, to reggaeton.

== Discography ==
=== Albums ===
List of selected albums, with selected chart positions
Title	Album details	Peak chart positions			
Title	Album details	US Chr.	US D/E.	US Gos.	US Ind.
Dope Beats, Good News, Vol. 2	Collaboration with Rhema Soul; Released: October 8, 2013; Label: Good City Music; Format: CD, digital download, streaming	—	—	31	—
We Belong	Debut album; Released: March 31, 2017; Label: Reach Records; Format: CD, digital download, streaming	7	7	—	17
Panorama	Second album; Released: October 19, 2018; Label: Reach; Format: CD, digital download, streaming	16	—	—	44
Heathen	Third album; Released: April 10, 2020; Label: Reach; Format: CD, digital download, streaming	—	—	—	—
Noche Juvenil	Fourth album; Released: March 26, 2021; Label: Reach; Format: CD, digital download, streaming	—	—	—	—
ATMOSTFEAR	Fifth album; Released: July 02, 2024; Label: Alienz Alive; Format: Streaming	—	—	—	—
"—" denotes a recording that did not chart or was not released in that territory.
Note: Beginning in 2015, Billboard rendered most hip hop/rap albums ineligible for the Gospel charts.

=== Extended plays ===
List of selected albums, with selected chart positions
Title	Album details	Peak chart positions		
Title	Album details	US Chr.	US D/E.	US Ind.
Lost In Hue	Debut EP; Released: July 29, 2016; Label: Reach Records; Format: Digital download, streaming	8	2	18
Holding Hue	Released: September 9, 2016; Label: Reach; Format: Digital download, streaming	11	4	42
954	Released: December 15, 2017; Label: Reach; Format: Digital download, streaming	—	—	—
"—" denotes a recording that did not chart or was not released in that territory.

=== Singles ===
==== As a lead artist ====
Year	Title	Peak chart positions		Album
Year	Title	US Christ.	Christ. Airplay	Album
2016	"In the Water"	48	30	Lost in Hue
2017	"Closer" (featuring RobbieLee & Julissa Leilani)	37	28	We Belong
2017	"God Speed" (featuring Andy Mineo & KB)	43	—	We Belong
2017	"Rock N Roll" (featuring ELHAE)	34	—	We Belong
2017	"Like We Belong"	—	34	We Belong
2017	"Diamonds" (featuring Jannine Weigel)	—	—	Non-album singles
2017	"High Note"	—	—	Non-album singles
2017	"Moments"	—	—	954
2017	"Thrills"	—	—	954
2017	"Bros" (featuring Madiel Lara)	—	—	954
2017	"Hit the Lotto" (featuring 1K Phew)	—	—	954
2018	"Slingshot"	—	—	Panorama
2018	"Fight For Me" (featuring Lecrae)	25	35	Panorama
2018	"Fashion Joe" (featuring KB)	—	—	Panorama
2018	"Get Em" (featuring Aklesso, Rhomar Jessy & TROSSTHEGIANT)	—	—	Panorama
2018	"With You"	—	50	Panorama
2019	"Hope You Say"	—	—	Non-album single
2020	"Not Too Far"	—	—	Heathen
2020	"Climate Change" (featuring Aklesso and Wordsplayed)	—	—	Heathen
2021	"Qué Pasó"	—	—	Noche Juvenil
"—" denotes a recording that did not chart or was not released in that territory.

==== As a featured artist ====
Year	Title	Album
2013	"P.Y.I.T.F." (Rhema Soul featuring Gawvi, Spzrkt, Rey King & Social Club)	Dope Beats, Good News, Vol. 2
2015	"Boogie Tonight" (Eximio featuring Gawvi & Ruslan)	Non-album single
2019	"Glory" (WHATUPRG featuring Gawvi)	Summer Nineteen
2021	"Zone" (Blanca featuring Gawvi)	Renovada (EP)

=== Other appearances ===
Year	Title	Album
2012	"Glow in the Dark" (Social Club featuring Gawvi)	Misfits (EP)
2014	"Social Club Is Not Dead" (Social Club featuring Gawvi)	Misfits 2
2016	"Against All Adz" (Wordsplayed featuring Gawvi)	Clowntown
2018	"Angels" (116 featuring Gawvi)	The Gift: A Christmas Compilation

== Awards ==
=== GMA Dove Awards ===
Year	Nominee / work	Award	Result
2019	"Fight For Me	Rap/Hip Hop Recorded of the Year	Won
2019	PANORAMA	Rap/Hip Hop Album of the Year	Nominated
