= Trip Lee =

American rapper from Texas

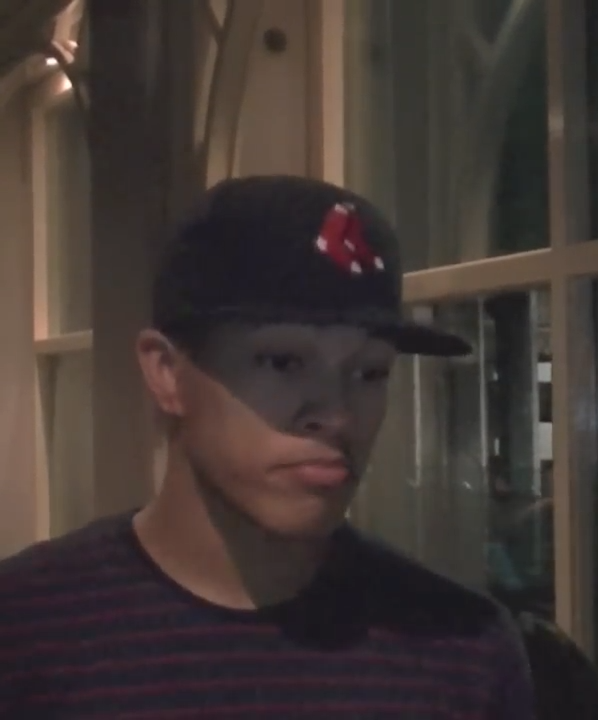
- Trip Lee in 2010

Background information
- Born: William Lee Barefield III; December 17, 1987 (age 38); Dallas, Texas, US
- Genres: Christian hip hop; Southern hip hop
- Occupations: Rapper; singer; songwriter; poet
- Years active: 2005–present
- Label: Reach
- Website: builttobrag.com
- Children: 3

William Lee Barefield III (born December 17, 1987), better known by his stage name Trip Lee, is an American Christian rapper, singer, songwriter, and poet. Signed to Reach Records, he has recorded both as a solo artist and as a founding member of 116 (originally known as the 116 Clique). Originally from Dallas, he served as the young adult pastor at Concord Church until 2021. His third album, Between Two Worlds (2010), was nominated for two Dove Awards and won the Stellar Award for Best Hip Hop Album in 2011.

== Biography ==
=== Early life ===
William Lee Barefield III was born on December 17, 1987, in Dallas. As a young boy, he had dreams of being a professional athlete or a famous rapper and he began to hone his lyrical skills at the age of 12. "I rapped about random stuff... how hot I was, how many girls I could pull,". After giving his life to Christ, at age 14, his focus changed from fortune, fame, and women to serving and ministering the gospel.

Barefield slowly recognized that all of his life should be centered around being a Christian. "One day, I just decided, I'm only doing Christian hip hop." Rappers like Ambassador and Da' T.R.U.T.H. helped provide a model for how "I would begin to do that," he says. Barefield had an immense desire to learn and teach the Word of God, so he became a leader in his youth group and he preached his first sermon to them at age 17.

In 2004, he met Lecrae at a concert; months later, after talking and building with each other, Lecrae began to disciple him. While still in high school, Barefield was given the opportunity to pen a few devotionals for the Reach Records website about theological matters and they illustrated his spiritual maturity.

He attended Cairn University in southeastern Pennsylvania and Boyce College in Louisville, Kentucky, the undergraduate school of Southern Baptist Theological Seminary also in Louisville.

=== Music career ===
Trip Lee signed with Reach Records and his debut album, If They Only Knew, was released a few days after he graduated from high school in 2006. His first full-length album introduced hip-hop fans to his distinct southern sound, unique delivery, and gospel-saturated lyrics. Also in 2006, he was featured on the Dove Award-nominated, Jesus Muzik with label mate Lecrae.

His second album, 20/20, was released in 2008 and was very successful, breaking into the Billboard 200 and reaching No. 11 on the Billboard Christian albums chart and No. 4 on the gospel chart. On his third studio album, Between Two Worlds, he reflects on life in a fallen world. His hope is that his songs not only resonate with listeners, but point to Jesus as Savior.

Since his first album release, he has traveled the world performing for thousands of listeners, and during three summers he toured nationally and internationally with his Reach label mates. His hip-hop music has given him numerous opportunities to preach and teach at conferences and similar events.

Trip Lee released two new singles "Brag on My Lord" and "King Like Mine", the latter featuring Alex Medina, on March 29, 2011. Trip Lee released his fourth full-length studio album, entitled The Good Life on April 9, 2012. The album featured notable Christian artists, including Sho Baraka (who formerly was signed with Reach Records), JR., Lecrae, J.Paul, KB, Andy "C-Lite" Mineo, Jimmy Needham, V. Rose, Suzy Rock, Jai, and Leah Smith. Trip Lee wrote a book titled The Good Life, to be released by Moody Publishers on October 1, 2012.

On October 9, 2012, Lee announced that he would be "stepping away" from music altogether. The Unashamed 2012 tour with the Reach Records roster was his final tour before pursuing a career as an author and pastor. He later clarified that he would continue to make music however he would not be touring as much. He is training to be a pastor at his local church, while being involved in ministry.

On October 27, 2014, Trip Lee released his fifth studio album, Rise. On January 27, 2015, his second book called Rise: Get Up and Live in God's Great Story came out accompanying the album. He was part of the Winter Jam Tour 2016 along with KB and Tedashii in central and eastern U.S. states.

On December 9, 2016, Trip Lee released a mixtape titled, "The Waiting Room." The title was inspired by a line in the song, "Take Me There" from his album, "The Good Life". He says the album highlights the fact that, as a Christian, his life is much like sitting in a waiting room, looking for what God has ahead for him. On March 4, 2022, he released his sixth studio album "The End." his first project in six years (the first since 2016). The album featured three singles "Supernatural," "Stone," and "Right Out The Gate." The album also featured artists WHATUPRG; Anike, a Nigerian rapper; Taylor Hill, KB, and Desi Raines.

On October 27, 2023, Trip Lee's seventh studio album "The Epilogue" came out. It includes a collaboration with Kirk Franklin, Hulvey, Madison Ryann Ward, Lecrae, KB, WHATUPRG, and Jonathan Traylor.

=== Ministry ===
In early 2011, he was a pastoral intern at Capitol Hill Baptist Church in Washington, D.C.. In 2014, he worked as the pastoral assistant at the church. In 2015, he became the pastor of Cornerstone Church West End in Atlanta.

In 2019, he became young adult pastor at Concord Church Dallas. He stepped down from his position as pastor in 2021. He said he resigned due to having chronic fatigue syndrome.

=== Personal life ===
Trip Lee and Jessica Barefield married in 2009 and they have three children.

== Discography ==
Studio albums

- 2006: If They Only Knew
- 2008: 20/20
- 2010: Between Two Worlds
- 2012: The Good Life
- 2014: Rise
- 2016: The Waiting Room
- 2022: The End
- 2023: The Epilogue

== Books ==
- The Good Life (Moody Publishers, 2012)
- Rise: Get Up and Live in God's Great Story (Thomas Nelson, 2015)

== Award nominations ==
GMA Dove Awards

Year	Award	Result
2011	Rap/Hip-Hop Album of the Year (Between Two Worlds)	Nominated
2011	Short Form Music Video of the Year ("Invasion (Hero)")	Nominated
2013	Rap / Hip Hop Song of the Year ("I'm Good" featuring Lecrae)	Nominated
2013	Rap / Hip Hop Album of the Year (The Good Life)	Nominated
2017	Rap / Hip Hop Album of the Year (The Waiting Room)	Won

Stellar Awards

Year	Award	Result
2011	Best Hip Hop Album (Between Two Worlds)	Won
