= Reach Records =

American record label

- Founded: 2004
- Founder: Lecrae; Ben Washer
- Genre: Christian hip hop
- Country of origin: United States
- Location: Atlanta, Georgia
- Official website: www.reachrecords.com

Reach Records is an American independent record label specializing in Christian hip hop. The label was founded in 2004 by Ben Washer and the hip-hop artist Lecrae. In addition to Lecrae, the Reach Records roster contains artists like Tedashii, Trip Lee, 1K Phew, WHATUPRG, Anike, Limoblaze, Jackie Hill Perry, Alexxander, and 2819 Worship. The hip-hop collective 116 operates under the label and consists primarily of the label's solo acts. The artists Sho Baraka, Derek Minor, Aha Gazelle, KB, Gawvi, Andy Mineo, and Hulvey were formerly signed to the label, and DJ Official was under the label until his death.

== History ==
=== Formation and early successes (2004–2010) ===
Reach Records began in Dallas in 2004, when 25-year-old amateur rapper named Lecrae teamed up with Ben Washer, a friend he met while doing youth ministry. According to Lecrae, knowing that people emulate the musicians they hear, it made sense to develop an "urban" label with Christian values.

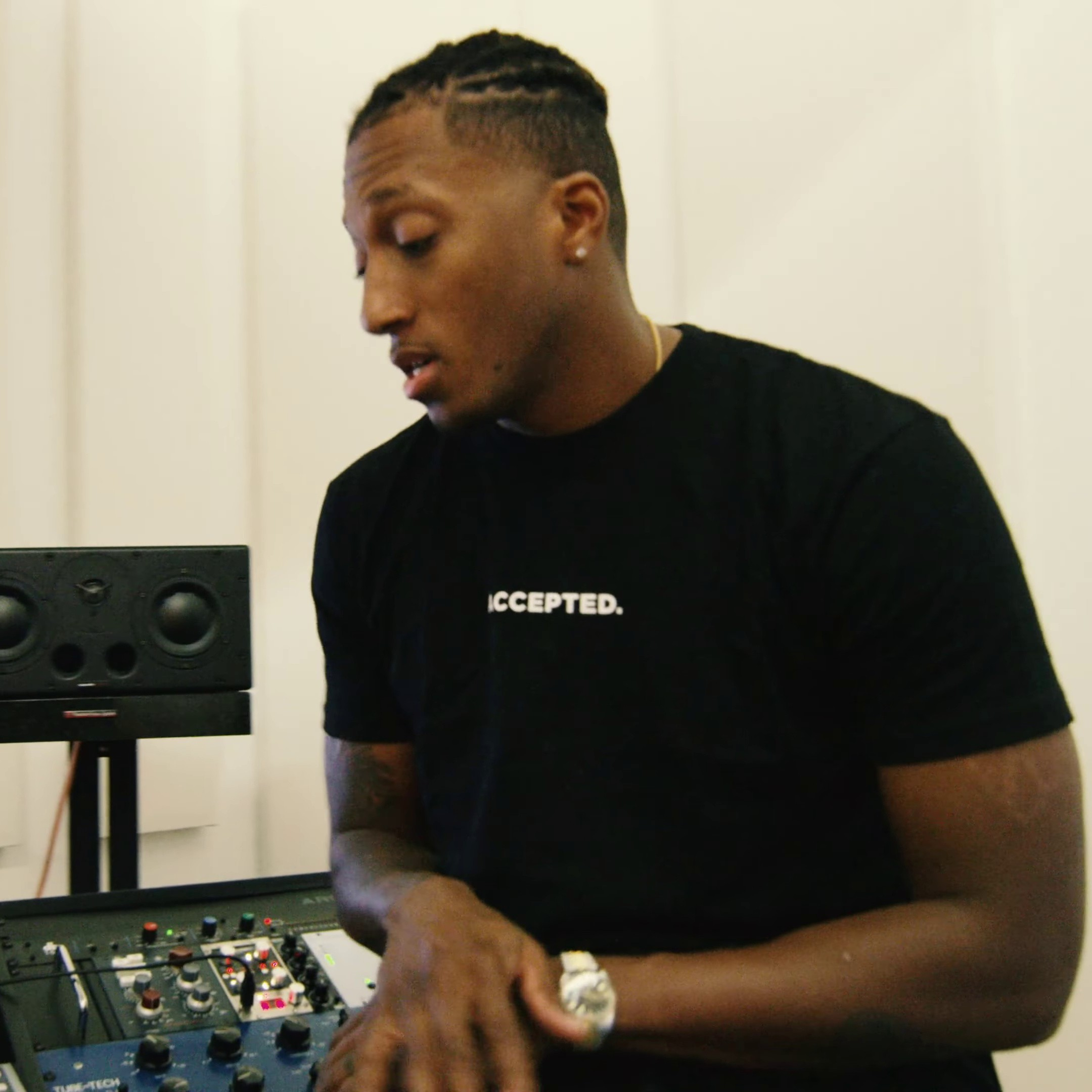
Lecrae, co-founder of Reach Records

In the same year that the label was formed, it released Lecrae's debut album, Real Talk, and in the following year, a more established Christian hip-hop label Cross Movement Records re-released the album, which charted at No. 29 on the Billboard Gospel chart. Also in 2005, Lecrae formed the hip hop group 116 Clique with his friends Sho Baraka, Tedashii, and Trip Lee, and co-founded the affiliated organization ReachLife Ministries to help minister to urban youth. Over the next five years, Reach Records released albums by 116 Clique, Lecrae, Sho Baraka, Tedashii and Trip Lee, meeting with increasing commercial success. Lecrae's 2008 third studio album, Rebel, became the first Christian rap album to top Billboard Gospel chart, and reached No. 2 on the Billboard Top Christian chart while Trip Lee's 20/20 hit No. 2 on the Gospel chart.

In 2009, Lecrae moved from Houston to Atlanta re-locating the Reach Records in the process, and Tedashii released his second studio album, Identity Crisis, which charted at No. 2 on the Gospel chart. In 2010, Lecrae topped the Billboard Gospel, Christian, and Independent charts, and hit No. 7 on the Top Rap chart, with Rehab. Trip Lee topped both the Gospel and Christian charts with Between Two Worlds, and Sho Baraka reached No. 3 on the Gospel chart with Lions and Liars. Sketch the Journalist, a blogger for Houston Chronicle, considered that year's Reach Records Unashamed Tour raising the bar for a traveling Christian hip hop concert. Also in 2010, KB, a member of the hip hop group HGA, signed with Reach as a solo act.

=== Mainstream breakthroughs (2011–present) ===
In January 2011, Derek Minor, then known as Pro, joined the Reach roster in a partnership deal with his own label, Reflection Music Group. In April, Sho Baraka announced that he was leaving Reach Records, though he continued to tour under the label for the remainder of that year, and remained signed with Reach Booking. In the same month, Reach and its affiliate ReachLife announced that they had renewed their contracts with the distribution company Infinity Music and its parent, Central South Distribution. The label announced in July that another artist, Andy Mineo, previously known as C-Lite, had signed with the label. That November, HipHopDX published a story on the filmmaker Art Hooker, who was working on the documentary film Unashamed, which traces the rise of Reach Records and 116 Clique and their contribution to the global underground Christian hip hop movement.

DaSouth.com noted the high level of activity by the label in 2011, and considered the biggest move that the label that year was its Man Up campaign, a multimedia initiative by 116 Clique which featured a studio album, full-length film, and accompanying curriculum, panel discussion, and concert tour.

In 2012 Reach continued to bring Christian Hip Hop into the mainstream market when it became the first record label to hold its own showcase at the South by Southwest festival. Sketch the Journalist mentioned on DaSouth.com that the appearance of Reach was part of a larger surge of hip hop artists, both Christian and non-Christian, at the festival, as according to him "many are saying that 2012 was the year hip hop took over the South by Southwest festival." XXL noted that the label had "a string of well-received and commercially successful album releases and tours" that allowed it to become more prominent. Trip Lee released The Good Life, topping the Christian and Gospel charts and reaching No. 3 on the Rap chart, KB debuted his first studio album, Weight & Glory, at No. 1 on the Christian and Gospel charts and No. 9 on the Independent chart, and Lecrae released both his highly popular mixtape, Church Clothes, and his Grammy Award-winning sixth album Gravity, which debuted at No. 3 on the Billboard 200 and topped the Gospel, Christian, Independent, and Rap charts. In 2013, label affiliates were part of DJ Don Cannon's showcase at South by Southwest.

2013 saw the releases of Andy Mineo's first studio album, Heroes for Sale, on April 16 which charted No. 11 on the Billboard 200 chart, and sold 28,000 units the first week. Derek Minor's fourth album, Minorville, was released on September 10. It was his second and last with Reach. Minorville charted No. 1 on Billboard Gospel chart and sold over 8,000 units the first week. Lecrae's mixtape, Church Clothes 2, was released on November 7 and made available for free on DatPiff.com and also sold through iTunes and Reach's website. The mixtape was downloaded over 100,000 times in the first two weeks, and reached to No. 21 on the Billboard 200 chart.

==== 2014—present ====
January 28, 2014, saw the release of Andy Mineo's EP Never Land, selling 26,000 units the first week, charting at No 13 overall on the Billboard 200. On March 4, KB released his EP entitled 100. The EP peaked to No. 22 overall on Billboard 200 while selling 14,000 units the first week. Tedashii released his fourth album, Below Paradise, on May 27, three years after his previous release. The album peaked at No. 17 on the Billboard 200, while selling more than 13,800 units the first week. Lecrae released Anomaly, the follow-up to the Grammy-winning album Gravity on September 9. The album debuted at No. 1 on the Billboard 200, with first-week sales of 88,587 copies in the United States. It is the first time an album topped both the Billboard 200 and the Gospel Albums chart. Lecrae also became the fifth artist, after Chris Tomlin (2013), TobyMac (2012), LeAnn Rimes (1997) and Bob Carlisle (1997) to score a No. 1 album on both Christian Albums and the Billboard 200. Anomaly also marks the sixth time that Lecrae topped the Gospel Albums chart and the fifth time he topped the Christian Albums chart. Since then, Lecrae has released two albums. He released All Things Work Together in 2017 and Let the Trap Say Amen (a collaborative album with Zaytoven) in 2018. He has also been featured on many single hits, including "Coming In Hot", his latest, a duo with Andy Mineo. In its second week of sales, the album sold 27,000 copies, bringing the total to 115,000 copies sold. In its third week of sales, the album sold another 17,000 copies, bringing the total to 137,000 copies. As of October 8, 2014, the album has sold 149,000 copies.

On January 13, 2016, Reach Records announced that one of its on-staff producers, Gawvi, formerly known as G-Styles, was signed as an official artist, and that he would be releasing his first studio album, We Belong. It was released March 2017. Gawvi was dropped from the label in February 2022, after, in the aftermath of his 2020 divorce, allegations surfaced that he had sent multiple women unsolicited sexually explicit photos of himself.

On October 28, 2022, Reach Records signed Nigerian born, UK based award-winning musician, singer-songwriter, Limoblaze, to its roster.

On June 13, 2024, Reach Records announced their latest signee Jackie Hill Perry. She dropped her single "First Draft" the following day, making it her first single release under the label.

On February 6, 2025, the label signed Puerto Rican artist Alexxander to the roster following his appearance on the 116 track, "King David."

== Artists ==
=== Current ===
Act	Year signed	Releases under the label
Lecrae	2004	14
116 Clique	2005	6
Tedashii	2005	6
Trip Lee	2005	7
1K Phew	2017	4
WHATUPRG	2018	3
Anike	2019	2
Limoblaze	2022	2

=== Former ===
Act	Years under the label	Releases under the label
Sho Baraka	2005–2011	2
Derek Minor	2011–2014	2
Aha Gazelle	2017–2018	2
KB	2010–2020	4
GAWVI	2016-2022	6
Andy Mineo	2011-2024	8
Hulvey	2020-2026	8

- Derek Minor is currently with Reflection Music Group and eOne, with which Reach signed a dual distribution deal during Derek Minor's tenure at Reach.

=== Producers ===
- Joseph Prielozny
- Nate "The Beatbreaker" Robinson
- Dirty Rice

=== Other instrumentalists and staff ===
- Lasanna "Ace" Harris
- Alex Medina
- Nate "The Beatbreaker" Robinson
- Natalie Sims

==== Former staff ====
- Street Symphony (co-signed with Track or Die)
- DJ Official (formerly signed with Cross Movement Records) — died on August 14, 2016

== Certifications ==
Reach Records received its first official RIAA certification when Lecrae went gold with 500,000 units of his Anomaly album, recognized on August 26, 2016. He went gold again with his ATWT single "I'll Find You" featuring Tori Kelly on March 27, 2018.

Andy Mineo went gold, his first plaque, with "You Can't Stop Me," recognized by the RIAA on January 17, 2018.

"Coming In Hot" by Lecrae and Andy Mineo, was certified Gold in August 2021. On October 16, 2023, the RIAA certification for this single would change to Platinum. Days later, KB's "Church Clap" alongside Lecrae would be certified Gold.

== See also ==
- 116 Clique
- Cross Movement Records
- List of hip hop record labels
