= Rapzilla =

Christian hip hop online magazine

- Website type: Online magazine
- Available in: English
- Owners: Philip Rood (2003–2017), Chad Horton (Sole owner)
- Creator: Philip Rood
- Website: rapzilla.com
- Launched: September 1, 2003
- Current status: Active

Rapzilla is a Christian hip hop online magazine. The website contains recent news, albums reviews, articles, interviews, music downloads, videos, release dates, and columns.

== History ==
Rapzilla was founded in 2003 by Philip Rood, who was the child of a missionary in Belgium.

In 2010, Chad Horton, who ran the similar Christian hip hop site "Hip Hop for the Soul" joined Rapzilla. In 2013, the Gospel Music Association organized the Dove Awards and announced a partnership with Rapzilla. In 2017, Rood sold his ownership of Rapzilla to Horton. In 2019, Rapzilla acquired Christian hip hop blog New H2O.

== Rating system ==
According to website owner Chad Horton, reviews by Rapzilla include an averaged rating by the staff to weigh against bias by a reviewer. Additionally, albums that rate lower than 3 or 3.5 are usually not reviewed until their popularity increases.
