= List of songs written by Natalie Sims =

Songs written by Natalie Sims

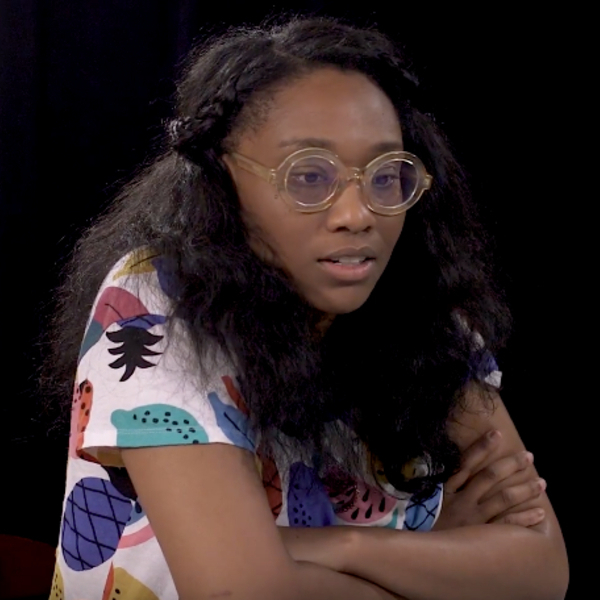
Sims as a panelist at Legacy Conference 2016 in Chicago, Illinois

The following is a list of songs written by Natalie Sims, a musician, songwriter, graphic designer and visual artist, writer, and music executive from Tulsa, Oklahoma. This list is of songs written in addition to her own work and works on which she has featured, both of which can be found at Natalie Lauren discography. As a songwriter, Sims' credits include extensive collaborations with her friend KB, the Iggy Azalea singles "Work", "Change Your Life" featuring T.I., and "Bounce", and the single "I'll Find You" by Lecrae featuring Tori Kelly. "Work" and "I'll Find You" each sold over one million copies in the US and were certified platinum, while "Change Your Life" and "Bounce" and sold over 500,000 copies and were certified gold. "Church Clap" by KB featuring Lecrae, was also certified gold. Other credits include compositions for Chris Brown Keke Palmer, Trip Lee, Jimi Cravity, Tedashii, Casey J, Gawvi, Joseph Solomon, and Koryn Hawthorne.

== List of songs ==
Work	Artist	Release year	Additional credits	Certifications
"Killa"	Lecrae	2010		
"That Will Be the Day"	Tedashii featuring Jenny Norlin	2011	Vocal arrangement, additional vocals	
"War"	Trip Lee	2011	Additional vocals	
"Fallin'"	Trip Lee featuring J Paul	2011		
"Beautiful Life"	Trip Lee featuring V. Rose	2011		
"Buttons"	Lecrae	2012		
"I Know"	Lecrae	2012		
"I Know [Tha Kracken Remix]"	Lecrae	2012		
"Open Letter (Battlefield)"	KB featuring Swoope, Trip Lee, and Jai	2012		
"Heart Song"	KB featuring Jasmine Le'Shea	2012		
"Church Clap"	KB featuring Lecrae	2012		RIAA: Gold
"Work"	Iggy Azalea	2013		RIAA: Platinum
"Bounce"	Iggy Azalea	2013		RIAA: Gold
"Change Your Life"	Iggy Azalea featuring T.I.	2013		RIAA: Gold
"Doubts"	KB	2014		
"Crazy"	KB	2014		
"New Bitch"	Iggy Azalea	2014		
"Just Askin'"	Iggy Azalea	2014		
"Bounce (Jester Remix)"	Iggy Azalea	2014		
"Dark Days, Darker Nights"	Tedashii featuring Britt Nicole	2014		
"Fear"	Lecrae	2014	Additional vocals	
"Insomniac"	Trip Lee featuring Andy Mineo, with Melanie Segura & Rebecca Folkes	2014		
"Sweet Victory"	Trip Lee featuring Dimitri McDowell and Leah Smith	2014		
"I Don't Belong to You"	Keke Palmer	2015		
"Blow It in the Wind"	Chris Brown	2015		
"Fall In Love With You"	KB	2015		
"Always & Forever"	KB	2015		
"Ima Just Do It"	KB featuring Bubba Watson	2015		
"Save Me"	KB	2015	Additional vocals	
"Drowning"	KB	2015	Additional vocals	
"This Time Around"	Tedashii	2016		
"Hallelujah"	Jimi Cravity	2017		
"Rock n Roll"	Gawvi featuring ELHAE	2017		
"Something Bout U"	Gawvi featuring Jawan	2017		
"I'll Find You"	Lecrae featuring Tori Kelly	2017		RIAA: Platinum
"Wish You the Best"	Lecrae featuring Verse Simmonds	2017		
"Worth It"	Lecrae featuring Kierra Sheard and Jawan Harris	2017		
"Hometeam"	KB featuring Lecrae	2017		
"DNOU"	KB	2017		
"Sing to You"	KB featuring Casey J	2017		
"Rebel Intro"	KB featuring Sarah Reeves	2017		
"High Note"	Gawvi	2017		
"Creation Testifies"	Casey J	2019		
"Adopted"	Casey J	2019		
"If God / Nothing But the Blood"	Casey J	2019		
"DNOU2"	KB	2019		
"Bigger Than I Thought"	Sean Curran	2019		
"Save the Love"	Joseph Solomon	2020		
"Home"	Joseph Solomon	2020		
"Find Me"	Joseph Solomon	2020		
"Start from Scratch"	Koryn Hawthorne	2020		
"Your Presence Is a Gift"	E. Dewey Smith	2021		
"In the Meantime"	Andreas Moss	2021		
"Little Seed"	Kierre Bjorn, Naomi Raine	2021		
"SuperDave"	Christon Gray	2024		
"Sacrifice"	Elijah Blake	2024		
