= Natalie Lauren discography =

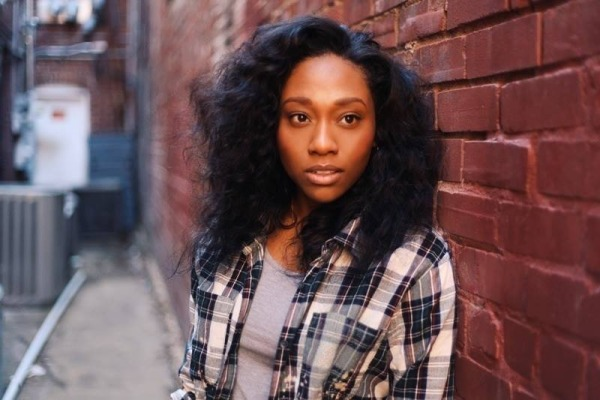
- Natalie Lauren in 2014
- Studio albums: 1
- EPs: 3
- Singles: 17
- Music videos: 4
- Mixtapes: 1
- Guest appearances: 21

The discography of Natalie Lauren, formerly known as Suzy Rock, an American Christian hip hop and R&B artist, consists of a studio album; seventeen singles, including seven as a featured performer; three extended plays; a mixtape; four music videos; and twenty-one other guest appearances, including frequent collaborations with Lecrae, KB, Swoope, and Sho Baraka.

She started writing hip hop music, when she was 11, while she became a Christian at age 14. She began her hip-hop career in 2002. Sims relocated from Tampa to Atlanta, Georgia in 2007. In 2009, Sims, under the moniker Suzy Rock, released a mixtape entitled So What. In 2012, Sims released a music and teaching series called Dirty Little Secrets. In 2013, Sims dropped her stage name Suzy Rock, choosing instead to perform as Natalie Lauren. She released her second EP, Red Eyes & Blue Skies, in two parts during Cancer Awareness Week, a national event in the United States. On October 23, 2014, Sims released her third EP, entitled Cliff Notes, as a free download. In the fall of 2015, Sims appeared as a guest artist on the Queens United Tour, an all-female tour by V. Rose, HillaryJane, Jasmine Le'Shea and DJ KB. She released her first studio album, Handle with Care, in 2020 through Rostrum Records and Native North. Five singles were released for the album: "Meditate" in 2019, and "Something Something", "Just Breathe", "Back to Love", and "Bra Off" in 2020.

== Studio albums ==
List of studio albums
Title	Release date	Label
Handle with Care	July 17, 2020	Rostrum; Native North

== Extended plays ==
List of extended plays
Title	Release date	Label
Dirty Little Secrets	July 2, 2012	None
Redeyes & Blue Skies	April 18, 2014 April 29, 2014	None
Cliff Notes	October 23, 2014	None
Handle with Care (Live)	March 22, 2024	None

== Mixtapes ==
List of mixtapes
Title	Release date	Label
So What?	June 25, 2009	None

== Singles ==
=== As primary artist ===
List of singles, showing year released and album name
Title	Year	Album
"Bad" (Remake of "Bad" by Wale)	2013	Non-album single
"Pills N Potions" (Remake of "Pills N Potions" by Nicki Minaj)	2014	Non-album single
"Redeyes" (Remake of "From Time" by Drake featuring Jhene Aiko)	2014	Redeyes & Blue Skies
"Meditate"	2019	Handle with Care
"Something Something"	2020	Handle with Care
"Just Breathe	2020	Handle with Care
"Back to Love"	2020	Handle with Care
"Bra Off"	2020	Handle with Care
"This is Not a Celebration"	2021	Non-album single
"Free Us"	2021	Non-album single
"Swoonin"	2022	Non-album single

=== As featured artist ===
List of singles, showing year released and album name
Title	Year	Other performers	Album
"High"	2010	Lecrae, Sho Baraka	Rehab
"Battle Song"	2011	Lecrae	Rehab: The Overdose'
"Hello"	2011	KB	Weight & Glory
"Hello (Hip Hop Remix)"	2012	Alex Medina, D-Flow, KB	Non-album single
"Queens"	2015	DJ KB, Jackie Hill Perry	Non-album single
"Reign"	2015	Duce Banner, Sho Baraka	His2ry in Progress: Return of a King
"Cuz We Can"	2021	Swoope, Gold Frame	24
"Don't Be Cool"	2023	Johnny Polygon	Non-album single

== Guest appearances ==
List of non-single guest appearances, with other performing artists, showing year released and album name
Title	Year	Other performers	Album
"Runaway Train"	2009	Rachel	Nothing W/O You
"Get In"	2011	PRo, D-Maub	PSA Vol. 2
"Survivor"	2011	Da' T.R.U.T.H., Sean Simmonds	The Whole Truth
"Drink from His Cup"	2011	PRo	Dying to Live
"Poppin' Off"	2011	Canon	Blind World
"Ni**as In Paris (AllStar Remix)"	2012	Flo, Canon, Young Chozen, Tedashii, Eshon Burgundy	Remixed, non-album track
"Runaways"	2012	Alex Faith	Honest 2 God
"No Regrets"	2012	Lecrae	Church Clothes
"Fuego"	2012	Lecrae, KB	Gravity (iTunes edition)
"Chapter 7: Denzel"	2013	Sho Baraka	Talented 10th
"Fantasy (Karac Drum & Bass Remix)"	2013	Trip Lee, Karac	Remix, non-album track
"Made for This"	2013	Butta P	Gurl Code
"Love Never Leaves"	2014	Tedashii	Below Paradise
"Best of Me"	2014	Swoope	Sinema
"All My Love"	2014	Trip Lee	Rise
"Better"	2014	Jackie Hill Perry, JGivens	The Art of Joy
"Calling You"	2015	KB	Tomorrow We Live
"Mixed Signals"	2016	Da' T.R.U.T.H., Ravi Zacharias	It's Complicated
"Perfectly Human"	2016	Da' T.R.U.T.H.	It's Complicated
"Fall Away"	2018	Jackie Hill Perry	Crescendo
"Catch 22"	2019	Swoope	Two for One
"These Tears"	2024	Swoope, Rich Perez	We Go On

== Music videos ==
Title	Year	Director
"RedEyes"	2014	Unknown
"Get Up"	2014	Amisho Baraka
"Something Something"	2020	Ray Spears
"God Morning"	2020	Natalie Lauren and William James Lofton
