= Church Clothes 3 =

Mixtape by Lecrae
- Released: January 15, 2016
- Genre: Christian hip-hop; conscious hip-hop
- Length: 36:28
- Label: Reach Records
- Producer: Black Knight; Epikh Pro; GAWVI; K-Ross; Mykalife; Ryan Righteous; S1 (also exec.); Shindo; VohnBeatz

Lecrae chronology
Anomaly (2014)	Church Clothes 3 (2016)	All Things Work Together (2017)

Church Clothes 3 is the third mixtape by Christian hip-hop recording artist Lecrae. It was released on January 15, 2016, through his label Reach Records. The mixtape is the third in his Church Clothes series, and his first major release since his studio album Anomaly (2014). It features guest appearances from E-40, N'dambi, Propaganda, John Givez, JGivens, Jackie Hill Perry, and then-label-mate KB. While the previous two mixtapes were hosted by DJ Don Cannon, on Church Clothes 3 S1 served as executive producer on the tape. In addition to S1, Epikh Pro, Black Knight, GAWVI, and others contributed production to the mixtape.

The mixtape was released without any prior announcement or marketing campaign. Available in digital form through iTunes and other online vendors, physical copies were made available exclusively through DTLR stores. Church Clothes 3 sold well during its first charting week, reaching No. 12 on the Billboard 200 and No. 1 on the US Top Christian, Independent, and Rap Albums charts. It also met with a positive reception from critics. It was highly praised for its high production value and it lyricism, which explores aspects racism, gang violence, and oppression; however, the mixtape also received some criticism for a lack of creativity and some inconsistency in its lyrical themes. Alongside the album, Lecrae released a longform music video entitled "Church Clothes 3: A Short Film", which features the songs "It Is What It Is", "Gangland", "Déjà Vu", and "Misconceptions 3". The music video was praised for its vintage feel and beautiful visuals. A second video, for the song "Freedom", was released on January 18, 2016.

== Critical reception ==
Professional ratings
Review scores
Source	Rating
Christian Manifesto	4/5 stars
Cross Rhythms	8/10 squares
HipHopDX	3.5/5 stars
Jesus Freak Hideout	4.5/5 stars 4/5 stars
Rap Remnant	4.7/5
Reel Gospel	3/5

Cal Moore at The Christian Manifesto gave the mixtape four stars out of five, noting the high quality and sonic diversity of the production values and Lecrae's growth as a lyricism and wordplay. He appreciated Lecrae's increasing social consciousness on tracks such as "Freedom", "Gangland", and "Misconceptions 3", which in his view "pull absolutely zero punches when it comes to addressing social ills", but found the tracks "Sidelines" (addressing Lecrae's critics) and "Forever" (Lecrae expressing faithfulness to his wife) to be clichéd. Moore concluded that Church Clothes 3 is a solid release, but that, at times, he found it overly similar to Sho Baraka's release Talented 10th.

Victoria Hernandez of HipHopDX rated Church Clothes 3 three-and-a-half out of five, praising the mixtape's production and how Lecrae's lyrics meld social issues with expressions of his faith, but opining that Lecrae did not introduce anything new on the tape. Rap Remnant viewed the mixtape highly favorably, rating it four-point-seven out of five and lavishing praise on Lecrae's lyrical themes of social injustice, racial tension, oppression, and the need for the Gospel. Carlin Doyle of Reel Gospel was more mixed, rating the recording three out of five. He likewise praised the lyrical themes of the mixtape, but found that, when compared to Lecrae's 2014 album Anomaly, the production on Church Clothes 3 is rushed and lacking in creativity.

Kevin Hoskins of Jesus Freak Hideout rated the mixtape four-and-a-half stars out of five, opining that with the solid production, deep message, and accompanying visuals, Church Clothes 3 "so much more than just a mixtape." Mark Rice, also from Jesus Freak Hideout, gave the mixtape four stars, explaining that he found Lecrae too defensive in his message, but otherwise highly pleased with the release. A review by The Red and Black found the mixtape's message regarding African American youth, gang violence, and inequality to be similar to Kendrick Lamar's To Pimp a Butterfly, albeit that Lecrae took a more direct and blunt approach. They likewise praised the mixtape's production, considering it some of the most diverse production to come from a Lecrae release. However, they found that, as the mixtape progressed, Lecrae resorted to trend-seeking and brag tracks, which clashed with the earlier themes of social oppression.

== Commercial performance ==
Church Clothes 3 debuted at number 12 on the Billboard 200 selling 29,207 equivalent copies (25,665 in pure album sales). It also charted at No. 1 on the Christian, Independent, and Rap Albums charts, as well as No. 3 on the Digital chart.

== Track listing ==
No.	Title	Producer(s)	Length
1.	"Freedom" (featuring N'Dambi)	S1; Epikh Pro^{[a]}; VohnBeatz^{[a]}	2:51
2.	"Gangland" (featuring Propaganda)	S1; Shindo^{[a]}	3:47
3.	"Deja Vu"	S1	4:09
4.	"Sidelines"	Mykalife; Ryan Righteous	3:36
5.	"Cruising"	S1; Epikh Pro^{[a]}	3:20
6.	"It Is What It Is"	S1; Epikh Pro^{[a]}	4:05
7.	"Can't Do You" (featuring E-40)	Black Knight	3:27
8.	"Forever"	S1; K-Ross^{[a]}	3:04
9.	"Misconceptions 3" (featuring John Givez, JGivens and Jackie Hill Perry)	S1; Epikh Pro^{[a]}	4:29
10.	"I Wouldn't Know" (featuring KB)	GAWVI	3:40

- ^{^[a]} signifies a co-producer

Notes

- "Cruising" contains uncredited vocals performed by Natalie Lauren
- "Can't Do You" contains uncredited vocals performed by Drew Allen
- "Forever" contains uncredited vocals performed by K.Ross
- "I Wouldn't Know" contains uncredited vocals performed by ELHAE

== Charts ==
Chart (2016)	Peak position
Canadian Albums (Billboard)	57
US Billboard 200	12
US Top Christian Albums (Billboard)	1
US Independent Albums (Billboard)	1
US Top Rap Albums (Billboard)	1
US Digital Albums (Billboard)	3
