= Rebel Intro =

Rebel Intro may refer to:

- "Rebel Intro", a song by Zion I from the album Break a Dawn (2006)
- "Rebel Intro", a song by Lecrae from the album Rebel (2008)
- "Rebel Intro", a song by KB from the album Today We Rebel (2017)
