= Natalie Sims =

American recording artist and songwriter

Natalie Lauren Sims
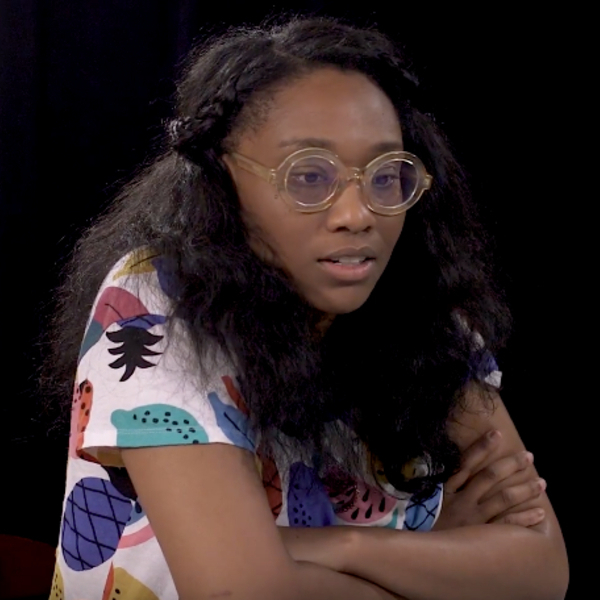
- Sims as a panelist at Legacy Conference 2016 in Chicago, Illinois
- Born: June 25, 1984 (age 42); Tulsa, Oklahoma
- Occupations: Recording artist; song-writer; painter; graphic designer; music executive; writer
- Employers: Native North; Cobra Music Group; Reach Records
- Musical career
- Also known as: Natalie Lauren; Suzy Rock
- Genres: Christian hip hop; R&B
- Years active: 2002–present
- Labels: Collide; High Society; Rostrum; Syntax; Native North

Natalie Lauren Sims (born June 25, 1984), also known by her stage name Natalie Lauren and former stage name Suzy Rock, is a musician, songwriter, graphic designer, visual artist, writer, and music executive from Tulsa, Oklahoma. As a solo artist she performs within the Christian hip hop and R&B genres, having released a studio album, eight singles, three extended plays, a mixtape, and a live extended play as well as being featured on numerous songs by other artists. She also is a member of High Society Collective – along with Sho Baraka, Swoope, and J.R. – which released a studio album, Circa MMXI: The Collective, in 2012. She released her first studio album, Handle with Care, in 2020 through Rostrum Records. Five singles were released for the album: "Meditate" in 2019, and "Something Something", "Just Breathe", "Back to Love", and "Bra Off" in 2020. A live EP of the same title was released in 2024.

As a songwriter, Sims' credits include the Iggy Azalea singles "Work", "Change Your Life", and "Bounce", and "I'll Find You" by Lecrae featuring Tori Kelly. She has written and performed extensively with her friend KB, with whom she also has partnered as an A&R executive. Other song-writing credits include compositions for Lecrae, Chris Brown, Sho Baraka, Christon Gray, Da' T.R.U.T.H., Tedashii, Casey J, Keke Palmer, Sean Curran, and Jackie Hill Perry, among others.

Sims' visual art and graphic design credits include albums by Deitrick Haddon, Juanita Bynum, and Casey J. Her paintings have been exhibited at Art Genesis in Los Angeles and Christie's in London.

== Biography ==
=== Birth–2009 ===
Natalie Lauren Sims was born in Tulsa, Oklahoma during 1984, and raised there as the daughter of Charles Sims, Jr. She started writing hip hop music, when she was 11, while she became a Christian at age 14. She began her hip-hop career in 2002. Sims relocated from Tampa to Atlanta, Georgia in 2007. In 2009, she met Iggy Azalea — who was still working under her birth name, Amethyst Kelly – and the two shared studio space with the producers FKi and Jon Jon Traxx. However, Sims and Azalea subsequently lost touch when Azalea moved to Los Angeles in 2010. In 2009, Sims, under the moniker Suzy Rock, released a mixtape entitled So What. She also featured on the song "Runaway Train" by Rachel, from the album Nothing W/O You.

=== 2010–11 ===
In 2010, Sims collaborated on the Lecrae album Rehab, featuring on the song "High", also featuring Sho Baraka, and co-wrote and provided backing vocals to the song "Killa." That same year, she designed the cover to Deitrick Haddon's soundtrack album Blessed & Cursed - Voices of Unity, which included her song "So What". Sims also provided art direction for Juanita Bynum's album More Passion and creative design for Thankful by Myron Williams. In 2011, Sims wrote for and contributed vocals to Blacklight by Tedashii and The Good Life (2012) by Trip Lee, and featured on the song "Fantasy" from the latter album. She also featured on the single "Hello" from KB's forthcoming album Weight & Glory (2012), an album to which she also contributed some song-writing. The song "Church Clap", featuring Lecrae, from Weight & Glory was certified gold in 2023. She also featured on two songs by Pro, "Get In" from PSA Vol. 2 and "Drink from His Cup" from Dying to Live, the song "Survivor" by Da' T.R.U.T.H. from his album The Whole Truth, "Battle Song" by Lecrae from his album Rehab: The Overdose, and Canon's song "Poppin' Off" from the album Blind World. Additionally, that year Sims co-founded the hip hop group High Society, along with Sho Baraka, J.R., and Swoope. The group released its first single, "One Moment", on June 20, and a second single, "Devil", on October 31, 2011.

=== 2012–13 ===
In 2012, Sims released a music and teaching series called Dirty Little Secrets, featured on Lecrae's mixtape Church Clothes and contributed song-writing to his album Gravity, and provided graphic design for the Deitrick Haddon soundtrack from A Beautiful Soul. High Society released its debut album, Circa MMXI – The Collective, on January 17, and a third, non-album single, "Young Again", on February 14.

While scheduled to tour with Tedashii and KB, Sims was contacted by Shawna Peezy, the manager for Iggy Azalea, requesting that she fly to Wales to help Azalea write The New Classic (2014). Sims was initially hesitant to take the offer, as she would have to cut her tour short, and felt uncomfortable with the risqué content put out by Azalea. However, she then received a call from Sarah Stennett from the London-based management team Turn First Artists. Stennett explained that her company was trying to commercialize Azalea's image. Sims understood this to mean a less provocative and explicit approach, and, hoping to be a more positive influence on Azalea's content, abandoned the last four stops on her tour and flew over to Wales in December.

After a short break in the United States for Christmas, Sims flew to London for a second session. She later wrote of her experience that "Fresh out of a breakup and depressed I spent a month in London in a small 10X10 studio somedays writing and writing and writing… Eating cottage pie. The first song we finished was Work. Regardless of whether or not u like the content the song told Iggy’s true story of struggle sacrifice and hard work as an artist." Sims contributed to five songs that appeared on the album: "Work", "Bounce", "Change Your Life", "Just Askin'", and "New Bitch" – which had the working title "New Chick". "Work" sold over one million copies in the US and was certified platinum, while "Change Your Life" sold over 500,000 copies and was certified gold. Sims later expressed regret at the final product of her writing sessions with Azalea, stating that "I wasted an opportunity to make music that matters. Not on every song, but a few. I squandered three minutes and 45 seconds contributing to the over-saturation of materialism, image obsession and a whole bunch of random, pointless stuff."

In 2013, Sims dropped her stage name Suzy Rock, choosing instead to perform as Natalie Lauren. She appeared under the name Suzy Rock on "Chapter 7: Denzel" on Talented 10th by Sho Baraka, and as Natalie Lauren on a compilation album, Gurl Code, specifically as a featured artist on the song "Made for This" by Butta P. Gurl Code was released on October 22, 2013, through Full Ride Music, a record label run by the rapper Thi'sl, and consisted of performances by various female Christian hip hop artists. In 2013, Natalie Lauren also began working with KB and the production team Cobra, which consists of Joseph Prielozny and Dirty Rice, on the EP 100. The four had previously worked together on the song "Open Letter (Battlefield)" from KB's album Weight & Glory.

=== 2014–2019 ===
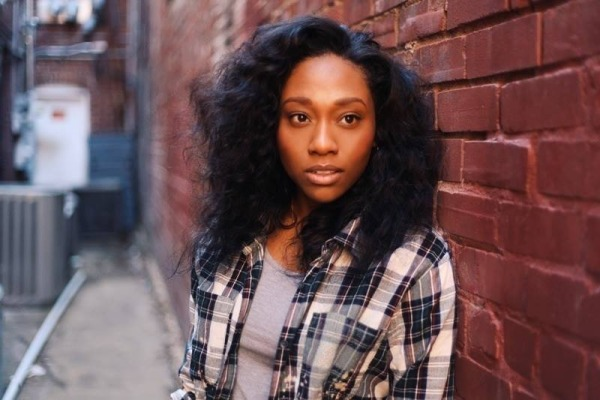
Sims in 2014

Sims' work with KB and Cobra continued through 2014, when the four traveled to Cape Town, South Africa to record KB's second studio album, Tomorrow We Live (2015). She also signed a deal with Kobalt Music Group as a songwriter and partnered with Reach Records as a creative director of A&R. During the month of April in 2014, Sims launched a project called Red Eyes and Blue Skies, designed primarily as a cancer awareness project. A website was debuted, and an EP, Red Eyes & Blue Skies, was released in two parts during Cancer Awareness Week, a national event in the United States. On October 23, 2014, Sims released her third EP, entitled Cliff Notes, as a free download. It features a collection of love stories, some based on Sims' own life experiences. She also created a webcast series Mic Mondays, in which she discusses various aspects of the music industry, for the website and art community Forth District. She also featured on and provided song-writing to Tedashii's Below Paradise, Trip Lee's Rise, Swoope's Sinema, and Jackie Hill Perry's The Art of Joy, and co-wrote "SuperDave" for Christon Gray's School of Roses album. In 2015, Sims contributed to Chris Brown's Royalty album, co-writing the song "Blow It in the Wind", and co-wrote the Keke Palmer single "I Don't Belong to You". She and KB also announced that they were working as an A&R team, and that they were advising and producing for Joseph Solomon. In the fall of 2015, Sims appeared as a guest artist on the Queens United Tour, an all-female tour by V. Rose, HillaryJane, Jasmine Le'Shea and DJ KB. On October 30, 2015, Sims featured with Jackie Hill Perry on the DJ KB song "Queens". On May 20, 2016, she featured on the album It's Complicated by Da' T.R.U.T.H., specifically on the songs "Mixed Signals" and "Perfectly Human". She co-wrote three songs for Lecrae's 2017 album All Things Work Together – "I'll Find You" featuring Tori Kelly, "Wish You the Best" featuring Verse Simmonds, and "Worth It" featuring Kierra Sheard and Jawan Harris. The single "I'll Find You" was certified platinum by the RIAA on February 26, 2020. In 2018, she featured on the track "Fall Away" by Jackie Hill Perry on Hill Perry's album Crescendo.

=== 2019–present ===
In 2019, she appeared on the song "Catch 22" by Swoope on his EP Two for One. That same year, on June 25, she released the single "Meditate" from her forthcoming album Handle with Care, through Rostrum Records. The next single for the album, "Something Something", debuted on January 17, 2020. According to Lauren, the song was written for her mother and for anyone who is "unseen and tired." A music video for "Something Something" was shot in Sims' hometown of Tulsa, and was released on February 28, 2020. For years Lauren was based in Atlanta but in early 2020 returned to Tulsa to care for her parents. On June 18, 2020, she stated in a Facebook post: "I want my life to be a loving invitation that compels others to consider and explore God. This is a Safe Space to Be Yourself with all the layers, Joys, nuances, questions, pain, freedom that comes with being: Black, Christian, Doubtful, Broken, Creative, Woman, Bi/Queer, Questioning, Independent, Artist, Undecided, Conflicted and still becoming as I am. This isn’t a space with all answers or resolves but it is a space to explore yourself and your creator through the Arts, Music & Conversations within this Community."

A third single, "Just Breathe", was released on May 29, 2020. "Back to Love" followed on Juneteenth (June 19), 2020. Lauren described the song concept as "the first day of Black Summer where we are free to simply be happy and safe again in the homes of our people. The music is historic and full of sobering celebration and nostalgia." On July 1, 2020, a fifth single was released from the album, entitled "Bra Off". The point of the song, according to Lauren, is assert that women should not be subject to sexism, insult, assault, and sexualization when they do not wear a bra. It also calls on women to be content without "doing" and "simply exist bare as women." Handle with Care was released on July 17, 2020, through Rostrum Records. Sims said of the album: "There are so many communities I am a part of and love. The Black community, followers of Jesus, LGBTQ community all play a significant role in my life and I want my music to be in support and love of them all through the arts." On September 16, 2022, she announced her engagement to Chelsea Tyler Hall. Lauren's painting "Pink Dream" was selected by Mashonda Tifrere as one of 15 paintings curated for Notes to Self, shown at Christie's in London from March 28, 2023 to April 14, 2023, and was featured at Tulsa's 2023 Juneteenth celebration. Painted work by Lauren was then included in Tifrere's Art Genesis "100 Days of Summer" exhibit in Los Angeles from July 26, 2023 to August 5, 2023. On March 22, 2024, Lauren released a live EP version of Handle with Care.

== Discography ==
- Handle With Care (2020)

== Other credits ==
Work	Artist	Release year	Credit
Blessed & Cursed	Deitrick Haddon and Voices of Unity	2010	Cover design
More Passion	Juanita Bynum	2010	Art direction
Thankful	Myron Williams	2010	Creative design
A Beautiful Soul	Deitrick Haddon and Voices of Unity	2012	Graphic design
100	KB	2014	A&R
Tomorrow We Live	KB	2015	A&R, executive producer
"I Believe"	KB featuring Mattie	2015	Vocals
All Things Work Together	Lecrae	2017	A&R
Today We Rebel	KB	2017	Producer
Trilliam 3	Aha Gazelle	2017	A&R
The Gathering	Casey J	2019	Producer, art direction, design, A&R
"These Tears"	Swoope featuring Natalie Lauren and Rich Perez	2024	Engineer
"Meet the Sun"	Joseph Solomon	2025	Photographer
