= Handle with Care =

Handle with Care may refer to:

== Film and television ==
- Handle with Care (1922 film), an American silent film by Phil Rosen
- Handle with Care (1932 film), an American pre-Code film by David Butler
- Handle with Care (1935 film), a British comedy by Randall Faye
- Handle with Care (1958 film), an American film by David Friedkin
- Handle with Care (1977 film), an American comedy by Jonathan Demme
- Handle with Care (1985 film), an Australian telefilm by Paul Cox
- Handle With Care (TV series), an American television series about the United States Postal Service
- "Handle with Care" (The Vampire Diaries), a 2013 episode of The Vampire Diaries
- Handle with Care (2017 film), a Norwegian film by Arild Andresen
- Handle with Care (Fear the Walking Dead), an episode of the television series Fear the Walking Dead
- "Handle with Care", an episode of the Netlifx cartoon series The Cuphead Show!
- Handle with Care (2026 film), an American film directed by Matthew James Thompson

== Music ==
=== Albums ===
- Handle with Care (Clarke-Boland Big Band album) (1963)
- Handle with Care (Natalie Lauren album)
- Handle with Care (Nuclear Assault album) (1989)
- Handle with Care, a 2001 album by Johnny Jenkins

=== Songs ===
- "Handle with Care" (song), a 1988 song by the Traveling Wilburys
- "Handle with Care", a 1966 song by Teresa Brewer
- "Handle with Care", a 2015 song by Kid Cudi from Speedin' Bullet 2 Heaven

== Other uses ==
- Handle with Care (novel), a 2009 novel by Jodi Picoult
