= Weight & Glory =

Studio album by KB
- Released: July 17, 2012
- Genre: Christian hip-hop
- Label: Reach
- Producer: Dirty Rice, Coko Korinne, Black Knight, Andre Atkinson, Mark Mims, Maurice Tonia, Street Symphony, Alex Medina, Geeda, Joseph Prielozny, Cheesebeats (a.k.a. Tha Kracken), Halo, PK, Karac, Benjah, Sky, and ThaInnaCircle

KB chronology
| Who is KB? (2011) | Weight & Glory (2012) | 100 (2014) |

Singles from Weight & Glory
- 1. "Hello" Released: October 28, 2011; 2. "Zone Out" Released: January 24, 2012; 3. "Go Off" Released: June 7, 2012

Weight & Glory is the debut album of Christian hip hop artist KB, released on July 17, 2012. It is a follow-up to his 2011 mixtape Who is KB?, and was highly anticipated since KB's signing to Reach Records in 2010. It features appearances by label-mates Lecrae, Tedashii, Trip Lee, and Andy Mineo, as well as Swoope, J Paul, Chris Lee Cobbins, and Suzy Rock, among others. Producers include Street Symphony, Dirty Rice, Cheesebeats, and Black Knight. The album debuted at No. 34 on the Billboard 200 with first-week sales of 9,700 copies. Critical reception was highly positive.

== Reception ==
=== Critical reception ===
Professional ratings
Review scores
| Source | Rating |
|---|---|
| Allmusic | 4/5 stars |
| Christianity Today | 4/5 stars |
| The Christian Manifesto | 5/5 stars |
| DaSouth | 4.5/5 stars |
| Indie Vision Music | 4/5 stars |
| Jesus Freak Hideout | Michael Weaver: Scott Fryberger: |
| New Release Tuesday | 4.5/5 stars |
| Rapzilla | 4/5 stars |

The album was received very well by critics. Christianity Today rated the album four out of five, stating that "Christian hip-hop doesn't get more fist-pumpingly urgent and soulful as it does when Kevin Burgess, aka KB, is on the mic." The Christian Manifesto rated the album a full five stars and nominated it for the website's 2012 Lime Awards. DaSouth gave the album a four-point-five out of five, along with New Release Tuesday, while Indie Vision Music gave it four out of five. Jesus Freak Hideout was more divided, with one reviewer giving the album a four out of five and the other rating it three-point-five out of five. Hollywood Jesus and Jam the Hype! were both favorable to the album. Rapzilla rated the album four out of five, stating "Weight & Glory is an impressive debut album. Even though there are a couple songs I didn’t particularly vibe with, the overall presentation is great. Many start their careers with lackluster debuts, but KB hit this out of the park."

=== iTunes chart position ===
Upon its release, Weight & Glory was reported by Rapzilla to have reached #2 on the iTunes Hip-Hop/Rap chart, and #11 overall within two hours. Rapzilla urged readers to push the album into the top ten spot on the overall iTunes chart, and the album subsequently reached #7. Jam the Hype! Radio subsequently urged readers to push it to the #1 spot.

== Track listing ==
| No. | Title | Writer(s) | Producer(s) | Length |
|---|---|---|---|---|
| 1. | "Weight Music" (featuring Jenny Norlin) | Burgess, Norlin, Mackey, Eason | Dirty Rice and Coko Korinne | 2:46 |
| 2. | "Zone Out" (featuring Chris Lee Cobbins) | Burgess, Cobbins, Peavy | Black Knight of Black Knight Creationz | 3:13 |
| 3. | "Anomaly" | Burgess, Atkinson, Mims, Tonia | Andre Atkinson, Mark Mims, and Maurice Tonia | 3:27 |
| 4. | "Don't Mean Much" (featuring Sho Baraka and also Mitch Parks from After Edmund) | Burgess, Lewis, Parks, Abbott, John Williams, Thom, Boller, Preilozny, Esmond, Okoth | Cheesebeats a.k.a. Tha Kracken for LateBloom Productions, Benjah, Sky, Joseph Prielozny, Street Symphony, and ThaInnaCircle | 3:37 |
| 5. | "Go Off" (featuring Tedashii and Andy Mineo) | Burgess, Anderson, Mineo, Medina, Cornelius | Alex Medina, Co-produced by Geeda | 4:28 |
| 6. | "Mr. Pretender" | Burgess, Relliford, Mackey | Dirty Rice | 3:50 |
| 7. | "Open Letter (Battlefield)" (featuring Swoope, Trip Lee) | Burgess, Swoope, Barefield, Sims, Williams, Ezell, Mackey, Prielozny | Dirty Rice and Joseph Prielozny | 5:29 |
| 8. | "Heart Song" (featuring Jasmine Le'Shea) | Burgess, Sims, Prielozny, John Williams | Joseph Prielozny and Cheesebeats a.k.a. Tha Kracken | 4:37 |
| 9. | "Angels" (featuring Flame) | Burgess, Gray, Peavy | Black Knight | 3:28 |
| 10. | "Tear It Down" | Burgess, Lightfoot | Halo for ATP | 3:45 |
| 11. | "Church Clap" (featuring Lecrae) | Burgess, Moore, Sims, John Williams, Prielozny | Cheesebeats a.k.a. Tha Kracken | 3:17 |
| 12. | "Hello" (featuring Suzy Rock) | Burgess, Sims, Prielozny, John Williams | Alex Medina | 3:06 |
| 13. | "Here We Go" (featuring PK Oneday) | Burgess, Taylor, Montgomery, Ace Harris | PK ONEDAY | 4:34 |
| 14. | "Zone Out (Amped Remix)" (Bonus track) | Burgess, Cobbins, Prielozny, Peavy, Boldick | Joseph Prielozny, Co-Produced by Black Knight and Karac | 4:07 |

== Charts ==
| Chart | Position |
|---|---|
| U.S. Billboard 200 | 34 |
| U.S. Billboard Top Gospel Albums | 1 |
| U.S. Billboard Top Christian Albums | 1 |
| U.S. Billboard Top Independent Albums | 9 |
| U.S. Billboard Top Rap Albums | 4 |
