= 100 (EP) =

EP by KB
- Released: March 4, 2014
- Genre: Christian hip hop
- Label: Reach

KB chronology
Weight & Glory (2012)	100 (2014)	Tomorrow We Live (2015)

Singles from 100
- 1. "100" Released: February 28, 2014

100 is the first EP of Christian hip hop artist KB, released on March 4, 2014.

== Reception ==
=== Commercial performance ===
The EP debuted at number 22 on the Billboard 200 with first-week sales of 14,000 copies.

=== Critical reception ===
Professional ratings
Review scores
Source	Rating
Allmusic	3.5/5 stars
Jesus Freak Hideout	3/5 stars

David Jeffries from allmusic gave the EP a 3.5 out of 5 praising the overall album-like quality. Michael Weaver of Jesusfreakhideout gave the EP a 3 out of 5 saying: "While it's great to see KB back in the mix, it's also a bit disappointing to see him not reach his full potential. "100" and "Undefeated" offer some enjoyment, with "Kamikaze" also being a decent track, but the other half of the EP may leave you scratching your head. There are a couple of tracks worth grabbing, but more than anything, this EP has me wondering what KB may have in store for his next full-length record. Hopefully it's more Weight & Glory and less 100 EP".

== Track listing ==
No.	Title	Writer(s)	Producer(s)	Length
1.	"Give My All"	Kevin Burgess, Chris Mackey, Joseph Prielozny	Dirty Rice, Joseph Prielozny aka. Cobra	3:16
2.	"100" (featuring Andy Mineo)	K. Burgess, Andy Mineo, Lasanna Harris, J. Prielozny	Lasanna "ACE" Harris for PK ONEDAY, Joseph Prielozny	3:39
3.	"Undefeated" (featuring Derek Minor)	K. Burgess, Derek Johnson, George Ramirez, Gabriel Azucena	G Roc for Beat Mechanicz, Gawvi	4:14
4.	"Kamikaze" (featuring PRISCA)	K. Burgess, Prisca Strother, Nick Chahwala, C. Mackey, J. Prielozny	Cobra	3:20
5.	"Doubts"	K. Burgess, G. Azucena, J. Prielozny, N. Sims	Gawvi, Joseph Prielozny	3:22
6.	"Crazy"	K. Burgess, Tyshane Thompson, Jacob Cardec, J. Prielozny, N. Sims	Tyshane, Cardec, Joseph Prielozny	4:27

== Charts ==
Chart	Position
U.S. Billboard 200	22
U.S. Billboard Top Gospel Albums	1
U.S. Billboard Top Christian Albums	1
U.S. Billboard Top Independent Albums	3
U.S. Billboard Top Rap Albums	4
