= Tomorrow We Live (album) =

Studio album by KB
- Released: April 21, 2015
- Genre: Christian hip hop
- Length: 50:16
- Label: Reach
- Producer: 808xElite; Cobra; Joseph Prielozny; Dirty Rice; De-Capo Music; Gawvi; Justin Ebach; Mpax; Supe; Swoope

KB chronology
100 (2014)	Tomorrow We Live (2015)	Today We Rebel (2017)

Singles from Tomorrow We Live
- 1. "Sideways" Released: February 23, 2015; 2. "Crowns & Thorns (Oceans)" Released: March 10, 2015; 3. "Ima Just Do It" Released: April 4, 2015

Tomorrow We Live is the second album by KB. Reach Records released the project on April 21, 2015.

== Critical reception ==
Professional ratings
Review scores
Source	Rating
AllMusic	3.5/5 stars
CCM Magazine	4/5 stars
The Christian Manifesto	4/5 stars
Christian Music Review	4.5/5
Christian Review Magazine	5/5 stars
Cross Rhythms	10/10 squares
Jesus Freak Hideout	3.5/5 stars
New Release Tuesday	4.5/5 stars
Rapzilla	3.5/5 stars

Mentioning in a three and a half star review by Jesus Freak Hideout, Kevin Hoskins realizes, "Tomorrow We Live is solid, carries good themes" despite its drawbacks listeners will still appreciate the tunes. Richard Spadine, indicating in a three and a half star review from Rapzilla, recognizes, "Tomorrow We Live adds up to slightly less than the sum of its parts, the parts themselves are well worth your time." Signaling in a perfect ten review at Cross Rhythms, Tony Cummings responds, "Gospel hip-hop has clearly come of age and this is another gem of an album." Marcus Hathcock, writing a four and a half star review for New Release Tuesday, describes, "this is deep, introspective, challenging material here." Awarding the album four stars from CCM Magazine, Andy Argyrakis says, "Even though his lyrics address struggle and hardship, he always leaves listeners with a Christ-centered promise that hope's right around the corner". Amanda Brogan, specifying in a four and a half review for Christian Music Review, writes, "Tomorrow We Live will provide your answers." Rating the album four stars for The Christian Manifesto, Tyler Martoia says, "it shows that this man is not trying to show himself as just a rapper, but as a true, well-rounded musician." Writing a review for Christian Review Magazine, Leah St. John rating the album five stars, states, "Tomorrow We Live draws you in and makes you long to hear what the next track has to offer, and the next, and so on." David Jeffries of AllMusic, gave the album a three and a half starts by pointing out KB's maturity and musical direction he took on the album saying "fans will appreciate all the musical growth as jazz, R&B, and other genres now figure into KB's rich mix".

== Track listing ==
No.	Title	Writer(s)	Producer(s)	Length
1.	"Rich Forever" (A re-release of a track called "Silver & Gold." Originally released November of 2014.)	Kevin Burgess, Lawrence Swoope	Swoope	3:47
2.	"Sideways" (featuring Lecrae)	Burgess, Lecrae Moore, Jamal James, Cobra	Cobra	4:15
3.	"I Believe" (featuring Mattie)	Supe and Joseph Prielozny	Burgess, Blair Atkinson and Joseph Prielozny	3:56
4.	"(9AM)"			0:39
5.	"Fall in Love with You"		Cobra	3:54
6.	"Always & Forever"	Burgess, Natalie Sims, Cobra	Cobra	4:42
7.	"Ima Just Do It" (featuring Bubba Watson)	Burgess, James, Sims, Cobra	Joseph Prielozny, Mpax	4:56
8.	"Cruising"	Burgess	Supe	2:34
9.	"Calling You" (featuring Natalie Lauren)	Burgess, Sims	Dirty Rice, Joseph Prielozny, 808xElite	4:17
10.	"Save Me"	Burgess, Sims, Jeremy Ezell	Dirty Rice, Joseph Prielozny	0:58
11.	"Drowning"	Burgess, Sims, Ezell	Dirty Rice, Joseph Prielozny	3:27
12.	"Lights Go Out" (featuring Blanca and Justin Ebach)	Burgess, Justin Ebach	Dirty Rice, Joseph Prielozny, Justin Ebach	4:19
13.	"Crowns & Thorns (Oceans)"	Hillsong United, Burgess, Tyshane Thompson, Gabriel Azucena	808xElite, Gawvi	4:52
14.	"Find Your Way (Bonus)"	Burgess, Sims, Willie Michael Stokes, Noah Ishmael Nwachukwu, Darius Michael Bryant	De-Capo Music Group for Vakseen LLC	3:50
Total length:				50:16

== Charts ==
Chart (2015)	Peak position
US Billboard 200	18
US Christian Albums (Billboard)	1
US Digital Albums (Billboard)	3
US Independent Albums (Billboard)	2
US Top Rap Albums (Billboard)	4
