= Today We Rebel =

Studio album by KB
- Released: October 20, 2017
- Genre: Christian hip hop
- Label: Reach
- Producers: KB; Cobra (Joseph Prielozny and Dirty Rice); D. Hood; Dirty Rice; Juice Bangers; Cardec Drums; Supe; Hillsong United; Joel Houston

KB chronology
Tomorrow We Live (2015)	Today We Rebel (2017)	His Glory Alone (2020)

Singles from Today We Rebel
- 1. "Tempo" Released: August 5, 2016; 2. "Monster" Released: September 15, 2017

Professional ratings
Review scores
Source	Rating
Jesus Freak Hideout	4/5 stars
The Christian Beat	4.8/5

Today We Rebel is the third album by KB. Reach Records released the project on October 20, 2017.

== Accolades ==
On August 8, 2018, the Gospel Music Association announced the nominees of the 49th Annual GMA Dove Awards, with Today We Rebel in the running for the Rap/Hip Hop Album of the Year award. On October 16, 2018, Today We Rebel won the Rap/Hip Hop Album of the Year award at the 49th Annual GMA Dove Awards ceremony held at Lipscomb University's Allen Arena in Nashville, Tennessee.

== Track listing ==
No.	Title	Writer(s)	Producer(s)	Length
1.	"DNOU"	Kevin Burgess, Mykallife & Natalie Lauren Sims	Mykallife	4:01
2.	"Tempo"	Kevin Burgess, D. Hood, Joseph Prielozny, Juice Bangers & Kenneth Chris Mackey	D. Hood, Dirty Rice, Juice Bangers & Joseph Prielozny	4:14
3.	"Monster" (featuring Aha Gazelle & Wes Writer)	Kevin Burgess, William Gazelle Fields, Jr., Wesley Smith, Jacob Cardec, Clint Lightfoot	Halo Hitz & Cardec Drums	3:18
4.	"Primetime" (featuring Ty Brasel)	Kevin Burgess, Tyler Alan Brasel, Kenneth Chris Mackey, Joseph Prielozny	Cobra	4:04
5.	"Get Through" (featuring Lecrae, DAB & Andreas Moss)	Kevin Burgess, Jonathan Andreas Thulin, Kenneth Chris Mackey, Joseph Prielozny, David Brown, Dustin Bowie, Lecrae Moore	Cobra	3:56
6.	"Art of Drifting"	Kevin Burgess, Jacob Cardec, Blair Andre Atkinson	Cardec Drums, Supe	3:24
7.	"Art of Hope"	Kevin Burgess	Cardec Drums, Hillsong United, Joel Houston & Joseph Prielozny	3:17
8.	"Not Today Satan" (featuring Andy Mineo)	Kevin Burgess, Andrew Aaron Mineo, Jacob Cardec, Kenneth Chris Mackey, Joseph Prielozny	Cardec Drums, Dirty Rice & Joseph Prielozny	4:07
9.	"I Am Not the One"	Kevin Burgess, Jacob Cardec, Kenneth Chris Mackey & Joseph Prielozny	Cardec Drums & Cobra	4:17
10.	"New Portrait"	Kevin Burgess, Doctor Jarvis Williams, Kenneth Chris Mackey, Lisa Sharon Harper & Emanuel Lambert	Dirty Rice	3:05
11.	"Bring You War" (featuring Scootie & for KING & COUNTRY)	Kevin Burgess, Joseph Prielozny, Benjamin Backus, Luke Smallbone, Joel Smallbone & Chris Michael Anderson	Scootie	4:02
12.	"Sing To You" (featuring Casey J)	Kevin Burgess, Kenneth Chris Mackey, Joseph Prielozny, Leeland Mooring, Natalie Lauren Sims & Casey J	Cobra	4:55
13.	"Rebel Intro" (featuring Sarah Reeves)	Kevin Burgess, Jacob Cardec, Natalie Lauren Sims, Kenneth Chris Mackey & Joseph Prielozny	Cardec Drums & Cobra	1:33
14.	"Rebel Rebel 88"	Kevin Burgess, Jacob Cardec	Cardec Drums	4:08

== Charts ==
Chart (2017)	Peak position
US Billboard 200	91
US Top Christian Albums (Billboard)	1
US Independent Albums (Billboard)	8
