= Bounce (Iggy Azalea song) =

Single by Iggy Azalea

from the album The New Classic
- Released: 27 May 2013
- Recorded: 2013
- Studio: Grove Studios (London)
- Genre: EDM; hip hop; trap
- Length: 2:47
- Label: Virgin EMI
- Songwriters: Iggy Azalea; Reeva & Black; Speedy Jay; Talay Riley; Oladayo Olatunji; Natalie Sims
- Producers: Reeva & Black

Iggy Azalea singles chronology
"Work" (2013)	"Bounce" (2013)	"Change Your Life" (2013)

Music video
- "Bounce" on YouTube

"Bounce" is a song recorded by Australian rapper Iggy Azalea for her debut album, The New Classic (2014) appearing on the deluxe edition. "Bounce" was written by Azalea, its producers Reeva & Black, Speedy Jay, Talay Riley, Oladayo Olatunji and Natalie Sims. Developed as a festival anthem about celebration, Azalea wanted the track to showcase a fun side to her artistry and offset the seriousness of her previous single "Work". Distinctly more pop-indebted than her previous material, the EDM, hip hop and trap song contains a prominent build-drop production formula and elements of Eastern music with tabla and sarangi instruments.

The track received generally positive reviews from music critics who complimented its catchy tune and tempo. Commercially, "Bounce" became Azalea's second top 20 hit on the UK Singles Chart where it peaked at number 13. It also reached the top 40 in Ireland. An accompanying music video was released on 6 May 2013. It was filmed in Mumbai, India, and inspired by the Bollywood disco era. The video features Azalea donning saris and bindis, performing belly dancing and traditional Indian dance sequences in Hindu wedding and Holi celebration settings. Most critics praised the video's concept and fashion, although public reaction saw it being accused of cultural appropriation by some. Azalea promoted "Bounce" with a series of live festival performances and on the premiere of Channel 4's Smells Like Friday Night. It was also included in the setlist for her 2014 The New Classic Tour. "Bounce" is featured on the soundtracks for the 2014 film Vampire Academy and the 2015 film Spy.

== Background ==
"Bounce" was written by Iggy Azalea and its producers Reeva & Black for Azalea's debut album, The New Classic. With the song, Azalea wanted to showcase a fun side to herself and her artistry, and to offset the seriousness of her previous single, "Work". "Bounce" was written as "something light and fun for the summer" and a "festival anthem" about celebration. Azalea also wanted "to see how the pop-rap thing would go". She recorded the track in early 2013, when she was on tour with Nas in London. Olatunji recorded background vocals for the track with Azalea at Grove Studios in London. The song was mixed by Anthony Kilhoffer at The Mix Spot in Los Angeles, with assistance from Kyle Ross.

Azalea found "Bounce" to be different from her previous releases and the most commercial song on The New Classic. She initially felt that it was a risky choice for a single, and consulted Nas regarding the decision; "With 'Bounce,' I was like, 'It's a pop record. I don't know.' [Nas] was like, 'Just fucking do it. It's something different. It's one song, what's the big deal?' I couldn't believe Nas was telling me to do a hip-pop record." Azalea also did not intend to include the song on The New Classic, believing that it strayed too far from the album's musical and lyrical themes, but her record label convinced her otherwise and it was included as one of the album's three bonus tracks. The song was later included in the main track listing of the album's reissue, Reclassified.

== Composition ==
"Bounce"
A 15-second sample of the song's uptempo refrain in which Azalea raps, "Shake it, break it, make it bounce".

"Bounce" is an EDM, hip hop and trap song. It incorporates elements of house and Eastern music. Charley Rogulewski of Vibe writes that the song adds a pop element to Azalea's "trademark trap sound". The track combines busy production with Azalea's energetic rapping—a combination viewed as "relentless" and "overwhelming" by some critics. The production consists of an uptempo, "club-friendly" beat and "squiggle" sound effects. Its instrumentation comprises winding synths, deep bass, and tabla and sarangi melodies.

In contrast with the song's tempo, Azalea's rapping is fast-paced and in Southern American English pronunciation throughout. A timed build-drop production formula is used to vary her delivery in which she puts emphasis on certain lyrics and lifts off on others. During the verses, Azalea's delivery is expletively riddled and contains trill consonants, particularly during the bridge, "All about money, the nice never ending / We party till morning, tomorrow we kick it". According to Digital Spy's Lewis Corner, the chorus causes the listener to "adhere to the song's title". In it, Azalea repeatedly raps, "Make it bounce / Make it bounce / Make it bounce / Shake it, break it, make it bounce". Lyrically, "Bounce" is about being carefree, partying, dancing, and celebrating life. Several critics compared the song to 2 Unlimited's "No Limit" (1993).

== Release ==
"Bounce" served as the second single from The New Classic internationally, with the exception of Canada and the United States where "Change Your Life" was released instead. The song's title was first revealed in an announcement about its accompanying music video on 15 April 2013. Azalea posted the single's cover art on Twitter on 24 April 2013. "Bounce" premiered on BBC Radio 1 on 26 April 2013, with Azalea uploading the song to her SoundCloud and YouTube channels the same day.

"Bounce" was first released as a digital extended play (EP)—which included a remix by DJ Green Lantern—on 27 May 2013 in selected countries such as France, while the release in several other countries were postponed to a later date. The delays prompted Azalea's fans to campaign an earlier release of the single; in a press release, Azalea explained: "The problem with kids – and I was one of these people too – is that they think they work in the industry and know how it all works. They're like, 'put 'Bounce' out now or it's gonna flop!'. I'm like, 'I need to promote it first or it's gonna flop!'. It's coming out on July 8 and I need fans to trust their fave on this one because it's for the best. I need to hashtag that – #trustyourfaves." The EP was later released on 5 July 2013 in Germany, 7 July 2013 in the United Kingdom, and 8 July 2013 in Italy and Spain.

== Reception ==
=== Critical response ===
"Bounce" received generally positive reviews from music critics. Eric Diep of XXL praised Azalea's "rapid-fire rhymes" and said the track "will certainly burn up the dance floor". Lucy O'Brien of The Quietus called the song "irrepressible". AllMusic's David Jeffries opined that "Bounce" was "simple and infectious", and "does just what it says on the tin". Jeffries' view was shared by Mark Beaumont of NME who also deemed the song "infectious", and Matt Jost of RapReviews.com who called it "simply fun". Rory Cashin of Entertainment.ie described its production as "overwhelmingly busy in a good way". In a State publication, Cashin deemed it a "warped earworm" and a "belter". Rap-Up hailed it as Azalea's "new anthem", and felt it was timed for the summer to "[shake] up the dancefloor". Similarly, Kyle Anderson of Entertainment Weekly opined that the song was "thumping" and "a thoroughbred entry in the song-of-summer race", while Juliana June Rasul of The Straits Times said it was "a perfect summer pop song". In a publication for The Atlantic, Nolan Feeney highlighted it as a "colorful butt-shaker".

Digital Spy's Lewis Corner gave the song a four (out of five)-star rating, and wrote that its production was of a "summer anthem level". Corner said the track felt "slightly lighter" than Azalea's previous releases, adding: " ... but if it means she crosses over into superstardom territory, it's a job well done". While Robert Copsey of the same website believed that it "felt like a somewhat needless moment of pop frivolity". Complex reviewers were also divided; Brian Josephs considered the track a "[clear] club banger", but David Drake criticized Azalea's "nimble rapping and forced accent". According to Drake, "['Bounce'] is the kind of thing that might work in the UK, where a digitally-animated frog once had a No. 1 hit with a cover of the theme to Beverly Hills Cop, but this will probably be a long shot at getting stateside club play". John Robinson of The Guardian felt it was "second-division" and "sheeeeeit". Karen Lawler of Blues & Soul opined that it recalled "a lost track" from Miley Cyrus' 2013 album, Bangerz, and dismissed its "nod" to 2 Unlimited as "cringe worthy". While Clash called "Bounce" an inferior version of "No Limit" and "criminal in every way", and opined that it lacked tune; "No Auto-Tune, though, because you need a tune to Auto".

=== Commercial performance ===
"Bounce" first charted on the Irish Singles Chart issued for 11 July 2013, where it debuted and peaked at number 34. It marked Azalea's first top 40 hit in Ireland. In the United Kingdom, Music Week reported that "Bounce" placed at number eight in the mid-week UK Singles Chart. However, the single's sales declined through the rest of the week and it entered the chart at number 13 with first-week sales of 22,401 copies. It became Azalea's second top 20 hit in the country and spent a total of five weeks on the chart. Although not released as a single in the United States, "Bounce" reached number one on the Bubbling Under R&B/Hip-Hop Singles chart issued for 21 June 2014.

== Music video ==
=== Background and development ===
The accompanying music video for "Bounce" was directed by BRTHR. It was filmed in Mumbai, India over a 10- to 12-day period with 16- to 18-hour working days. BRTHR previously applied to direct Azalea's music video for "Work", but Jonas & François were hired instead; BRTHR's strong interest in working with Azalea encouraged them to try again with "Bounce". Azalea's label wanted BRTHR to work with executive producer Eli Born for the music video because they felt confident in him after his involvement in the "Work" music video. BRTHR were guided by their producer Brendan Lynch and executive producer Geoff McLean. Equipment by the Red Digital Cinema Camera Company and Carl Zeiss AG were used for filming. In an interview for MTV UK, Azalea detailed the inspiration behind the video:

"My mother growing up was really, really close friends with an Indian woman. She ended up having an arranged marriage oddly enough and I remember going to her wedding and it was one of the only weddings that I've EVER been to, besides my own mother's, and it was the biggest party, the most fun ever. So when I was doing 'Bounce', you know I don't actually drink or smoke so I thought I don't wanna do a video in a club like poppin' bottles and all this stuff, although the song's about partying. I [wanted to] do a celebration... and it made me think of that experience with my mother's friend going to an Indian wedding and having the most crazy and amazing time and I though I wanna do an Indian wedding! And I wanna do it in India! And I wanna do it properly...and I put an elephant in there for good luck."

Azalea also envisioned an Eastern theme for the music video because of the song's Eastern music influences and her interest in Bollywood films. BRTHR wrote a Hindu wedding scenario for the video, with Azalea as the bride. At Azalea's request, the video was filmed in Mumbai's streets and slums, and on Bollywood sets. Because of the increased cost of filming on location, Azalea decided to personally contribute to the video's budget. T.I. was scheduled to appear in the music video, but was unable due to visa delays. Azalea's stylist, Alejandra Hernandez, coordinated the rapper's wardrobe, inspired by Bollywood disco era and Indian actress Parveen Babi. Hernandez used bold-coloured saris in the video; she prepared Azalea's wardrobe in Los Angeles, and her creations were made in London and Mumbai. Azalea's jewelry was also purchased in Mumbai.

The team hired an Indian film crew, and spent the entire budget in India. Stratum Films in Mumbai helped find locations and cast extras. Choreographer Devang Desai assembled Indian dancers, and worked with Azalea on a Bollywood dance routine unique to "Bounce" and Azalea's style. With the exception of the video's celebration scenes, BRTHR filmed in guerilla "run and gun" style, and occasionally paid local police to facilitate a setup. According to Azalea, the Indian elephant in the clip took a month to find, and "the Indian mafia" were needed to shut down a street in Mumbai for the filming of her scene with it. Avinash Shankar was later hired to consult to the filming's cultural and visual issues. BRTHR stated that "Bounce" was the most difficult music video they had ever directed because of the persistent difficulties they encountered with its on-location production and final version-editing. A narrative with a speech introducing Azalea at the wedding was cut from the final version. In an interview for Rap-Up, Azalea stated, "It's just so crazy to dream something so big and actually see it happen".

=== Synopsis ===
A screenshot from the video, with Azalea in a red sari and bindi inspired by the Bollywood disco era

The video opens with a bird's-eye view of Mumbai, with Azalea's name and "Bounce" in large yellow text. Scenes with local residents include a young Indian boy and children playing cricket. Azalea, in a gold bodysuit and Indian inspired clothing, slouches atop an Indian elephant. The song begins with Azalea and a troupe of female Indian dancers entering a darkened Bollywood set for a traditional Indian wedding. Azalea and the dancers, in traditional red saris with bindis, begin belly dancing and modernised Indian dance routines. The scene is intercut with snippets of Azalea walking and dancing in Mumbai's slums. On the Bollywood set, a large Indian family are seen celebrating, drinking and dancing. Azalea (in a green sari) dances in a garden, rides an elephant along city streets and travels in an auto rickshaw, wearing a printed silk blouse, with the wind blowing through her hair. Now in a blue sari, she lies on the elephant, gesturing with her hands and dancing next to Indian children on a cluttered platform.

The video returns to the Bollywood set, where Azalea dances at the wedding and before a moving backdrop with occasional slow-motion sequences. In a white sari with a golden crown, she performs (surrounded by children) at a Holi celebration. After a series of jump cuts, the video ends with Azalea driving off on a motorcycle under a shower of flower petals.

=== Release and reception ===
A teaser of the video was first unveiled by Azalea for Digital Spy on 1 May 2013. Prior to the video's release, Azalea also posted images of her wardrobe on Instagram. The video premiered on Vevo on 6 May 2013. A behind-the-scenes segment was released on 10 June 2013. The music video received positive reviews from critics and was nominated for Best Video at the 2014 MtvU Woodie Awards, but lost to Chance the Rapper's "Everybody's Something". Some critics compared the video to Selena Gomez's "Come & Get It" (2013).

Digital Spy's Lewis Corner wrote, "We knew [Azalea] had the tunes, but now we know she has the moves". Jean Trinh of The Daily Beast said that Azalea never disappoints with her music videos, and described the "Bounce" video as "breathtaking" and "entertaining". Liza Darwin of MTV News praised the video's fashion, and quipped, "Now that the clip's finally premiered, everyone can bask in its glimmering, glittering glory". Jessie Peterson of the same website likened Azalea's bodysuit to Babi in the 1982 film Namak Halaal, and zentai. Natalie Wall of Cosmopolitan complimented the Bollywood theme and called Azalea her "new style crush". Stephen Kearse of Respect. wrote that the artistic texture of the visual was "so rich that the song and music video became inextricable, each always invoking each other". Kearse said it brought the song to life, and added, "It is unclear whether or not the song was produced with such an affinity for Indian images, but the match up genuinely works". Brian Josephs of Complex commended the avoidance of a clichéd club setting, and called the video "fun to watch". The video's global theme was compared to that of Macklemore & Ryan Lewis' "Can't Hold Us" by a writer for MuchMusic who opined that Azalea provided a good representation of Indian style and culture, and complimented her appreciation of it. Conversely, Ingrid Kesa of Oyster felt it followed the trend of filming a high-budget video in a developing country. While John Robinson of The Guardian was critical of the video's "rather tired Bollywood concept".

A report by The Northern Star highlighted that public reaction to the music video saw many accusing it of cultural appropriation. According to Nico Lang of the Los Angeles Times, Azalea's sari and bindi attire "drew ire". Similar blog reaction led to Bruce Sterling of Wired invoking Kareena Kapoor's "Hai Re Hai Re" from the 2003 Hindi film, Khushi: "Bring in some class analysis, too, 'cause our Kareena's a born starchild who is worth millions while Iggy is a high-school dropout who used to clean hotels." The Sunshine Coast Daily hosted an online poll asking if the music video was offensive; 63% of its readers voted "no" and 36% voted "yes". BRTHR later addressed the accusations, and stated that they specifically hired an Indian producer for the filming to avoid the video from offending Indian culture. According to BRTHR, the producer's requests were to remove profanity from the dialogue and to ensure Azalea's wardrobe was "not too offensive". The music video has received over 90 million views on YouTube as of June 2017.

== Live performances ==
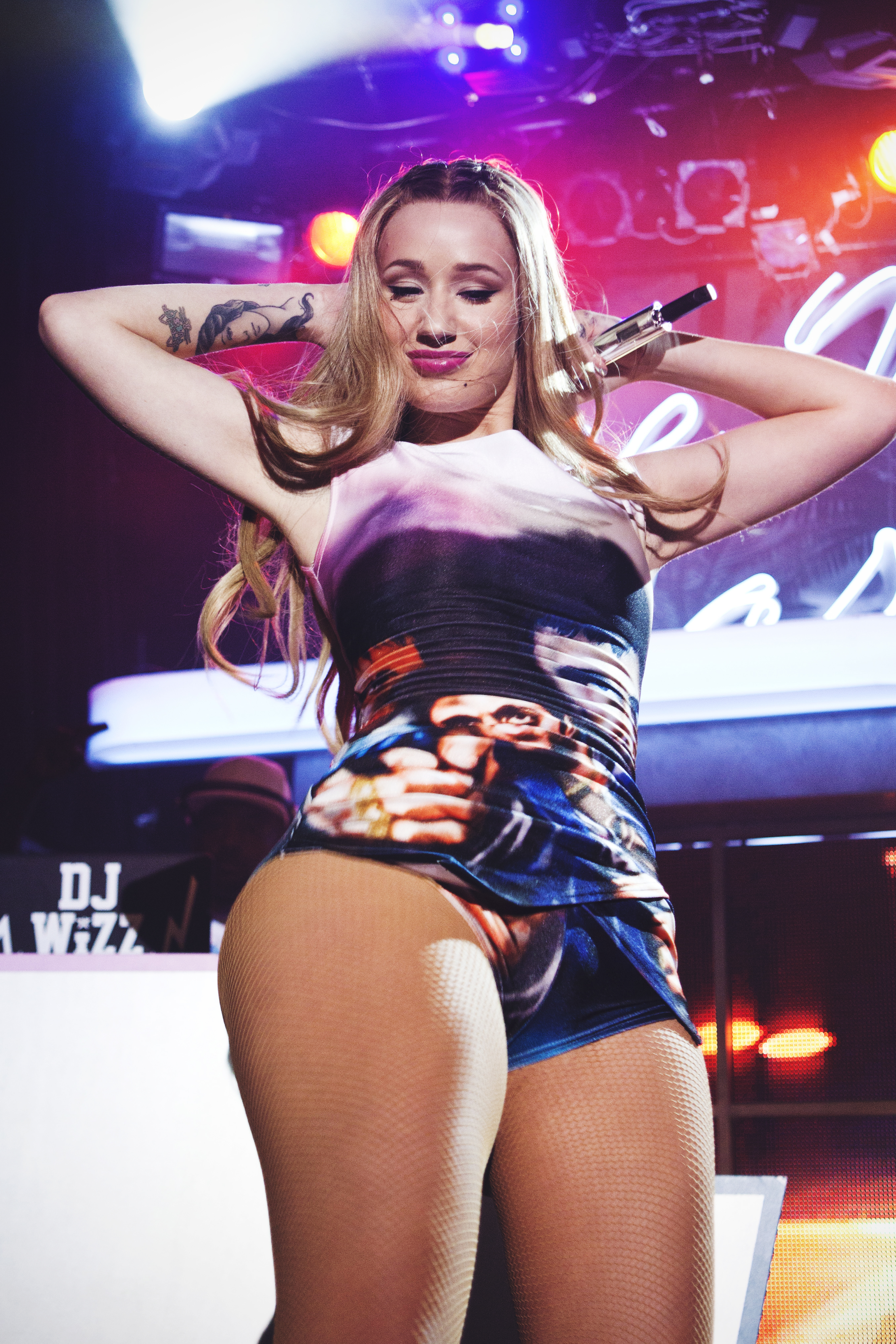
Azalea performing "Bounce" during The New Classic Tour (2014)

Azalea first performed "Bounce" during her sets at The Great Escape Festival on 21 May 2013, and Radio 1's Big Weekend later that month. She also performed the song during her setlists for Gucci's Chime for Change Concert, The Parklife Weekender and the Glastonbury Festival in June 2013. Azalea gave her first live, televised performance of the track on the premiere of Channel 4's Smells Like Friday Night on 21 June 2013. The song was then performed during her sets at the Wireless Festival, and London nightclubs G-A-Y and Fabric in July 2013. "Bounce" was later included in Azalea's setlist at the 2013 iTunes Festival, where she was a supporting act for Katy Perry. In October 2013, Azalea performed the track as part of her sets during Beyoncé's The Mrs. Carter Show World Tour.

In 2014, "Bounce" featured in the setlist for Azalea's first headlining tour, The New Classic Tour. She also performed the song during her sets for the 2014 MtvU Woodie Awards at South by Southwest in April, and the Jingle Ball Tour 2014 in December. Azalea performed "Bounce" in her setlist for the Redfest in February 2015. She reprised the song for her set at South by Southwest in March 2015; the rendition incorporated elements of Silentó's "Watch Me". Azalea also performed "Bounce" during her gigs at the Ottawa Bluesfest and Quebec City Summer Festival in July 2015.

== Track listing ==
- Digital download (EP)
1. "Bounce" – 2:47
2. "Bounce" (DJ Green Lantern Remix) – 4:24
3. "Bounce" (Instrumental) – 2:46
4. "Bounce" (Acappella) – 2:46

== Credits and personnel ==
- Iggy Azalea – writer, vocals
- Reeva & Black – writers, producers, vocal engineering
- Dyo – writer, background vocals
- Speedy Jay – writer
- Talay Riley – writer
- Natalie Sims – writer
- Anthony Kilhoffer – mixing
- Kyle Ross – mixing assistant

Credits adapted from the album's liner notes.

== Charts ==
Chart (2013–14)	Peak position
Australia Urban (ARIA)	18
Belgium (Ultratip Bubbling Under Flanders)	44
Belgium Urban (Ultratop Flanders)	32
Ireland (IRMA)	34
Scottish Singles Sales (Official Charts)	10
UK Singles (Official Charts)	13
UK Hip Hop/R&B (Official Charts)	3
US Bubbling Under R&B/Hip-Hop Singles (Billboard)	1

== Certifications ==
Region	Certification	Certified units/sales
United States (RIAA)	Gold	500,000^{‡}
^{‡} Sales+streaming figures based on certification alone.

== Release history ==
Country	Date	Format	Label	Ref.
France	27 May 2013	Digital download (EP)	Universal Music	
Germany	5 July 2013	Digital download (EP)	Universal Music	
United Kingdom	7 July 2013	Digital download (EP)	Virgin EMI	
Italy	8 July 2013	Digital download (EP)	Universal Music	
Spain	8 July 2013	Digital download (EP)	Universal Music	
