= Work (Iggy Azalea song) =

2013 single by Iggy Azalea

Single by Iggy Azalea

from the album The New Classic
- Released: 17 March 2013
- Recorded: December 2012–January 2013
- Studio: Rockfield Studios and Monnow Valley Studios (Wales)
- Genre: Hip hop; snap
- Length: 3:43
- Label: Def Jam; Virgin EMI
- Songwriters: Iggy Azalea; The Invisible Men; Trocon Markous Roberts; Natalie Sims
- Producers: The Invisible Men; 1st Down of FKi

Iggy Azalea singles chronology
"Beat Down" (2012)	"Work" (2013)	"Bounce" (2013)

Music video
- "Work" on YouTube

"Work" is the debut single recorded by Australian rapper Iggy Azalea for her debut studio album, The New Classic (2014). It was released as the album's lead single on 17 March 2013. The track was written by Azalea, Trocon Markous Roberts, Natalie Sims, and The Invisible Men who produced it with 1st Down of FKi. Hailed by Azalea as her most personal song, "Work" was developed with motivational and inspirational intentions to portray her life story; specifically dealing with her struggle as an up-and-coming rapper, and her relocation from Mullumbimby, New South Wales, to Miami, Florida, at age 16. In sequence with its lyrical story, the snap and trap track begins with a sad-stringed verse segment before significantly increasing in tempo at its drum and synth-heavy refrain.

A number of music critics consider the song to be among Azalea's best output, namely praising her flow and the depth of the lyrical content. Commercially, "Work" became a sleeper hit; it peaked at number 17 on the UK Singles Chart and number 54 on the US Billboard Hot 100, but was certified gold and platinum by the British Phonographic Industry (BPI) and Recording Industry Association of America (RIAA), respectively. "Work" became one of the lowest peaking songs to receive a sales certification in Australia where it reached number 79 and was certified gold by the Australian Recording Industry Association (ARIA).

An accompanying music video was directed by Jonas & François and released on 13 March 2013. Inspired by several films, it features Azalea performing twerking sequences and a recreation of Vanessa Ferlito's lap dancing in the 2007 film, Death Proof. The video earned Azalea a nomination for Artist to Watch at the 2013 MTV Video Music Awards, and was praised by critics for its fashion, and portrayal of the song's lyrics. Among her live performance staples, Azalea promoted the single with live renditions on Britain & Ireland's Next Top Model and Nikki & Sara Live. It was also included in the set list for her The New Classic Tour (2014). A number of remixes were commissioned for the single's release, including an official remix featuring American rapper Wale.

== Background ==
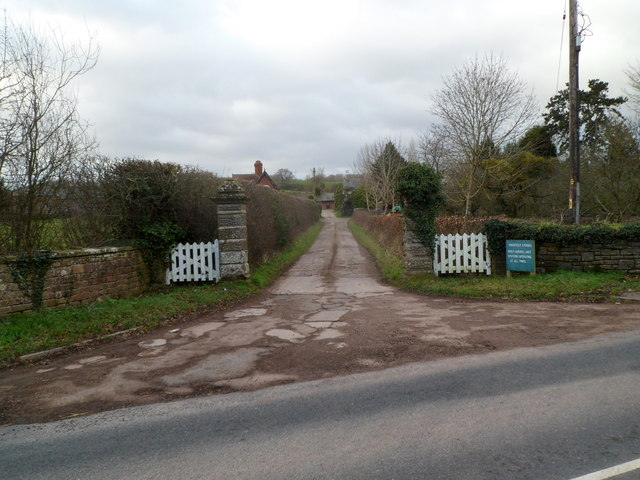
Rockfield Studios, one of the studios in which "Work" was recorded

During December 2012 and January 2013, "Work" was developed by Iggy Azalea as one of the first three songs for her debut studio album, The New Classic. The song was written in Wales during a period of heavy rain which inspired her to create a track that was "sad, but in a weird way, like happy or calming or sort of peaceful". With the track, she wanted to give as much information as she could about herself to detract her listeners from being influenced by criticism and tabloid journalism about her; she disliked the idea of revisiting her past, but felt that it was necessary for her listeners to relate with. Being her first autobiographical song, Azalea encountered difficulty during its writing because of the personal subject matter which she felt she could not fit into a song on its own.

Azalea wrote the song with The Invisible Men, Trocon Markous Roberts and Natalie Sims. Sims stated that she, FKi, and Azalea had initially met back in 2008, but lost touch when Azalea moved to Los Angeles. The track specifically drew inspiration from a period when Azalea suffered from depression, and dropped out of high school to become a domestic worker with her mother. Azalea saved money for a flight ticket to Miami and left Mullumbimby, New South Wales before she turned 16—an event referenced in the song's lyric "No money / No family / 16 in the middle of Miami" which Azalea felt "said it all". For this reason, she chose to write and record "Work" in isolation in Rockfield, Monmouthshire, with no phone reception, visitors or interruptions. She felt as a location it would help her recall the personal struggles she wanted to write about on the song. Azalea also believed that her best output was produced when in an environment outside her comfort zone. Her vocals were recorded at Rockfield Studios and Monnow Valley Studios. Sims, who abandoned four tour dates in order to fly over to Britain to join Azalea, commented on her own involvement in the song that "Fresh out of a breakup and depressed I spent a month in London in a small 10×10 studio somedays writing and writing and writing… Regardless of whether or not you like the content the song told Iggy's true story of struggle sacrifice and hard work as an artist."

Musically, Azalea found inspiration for the composition in the chord progression featured in Outkast's "B.O.B" (2000). "Work" was produced by The Invisible Men and 1st Down of FKi. Azalea stated that the producers "found a middle ground" on the song, with 1st Down being responsible for its "cool alternative sound", and The Invisible Men creating its "more commercialised, cleaner [and] sleeker sound". Anthony Kilhoffer completed the mixing process, with the assistance of Kyle Ross, at The Mix Spot in Los Angeles. Following the song's completion, Azalea felt that it achieved the goal she set for its parent album, and denoted it as the record's most important and vulnerable moment. She has also cited it as her most personal song and the song she is most proud of.

== Composition ==
"Work"
A 15-second sample of the snap, trap refrain in "Work", with Azalea repeating the lyric "Now get this work".

"Work" is a snap and trap song which incorporates elements of EDM. Nina Long of Respect. describes it as the "polar opposite" of Azalea's previous material. The track opens with Azalea challenging "Walk a mile in these Louboutins", upon a sweeping keyboard introduction and balladic beat. The song starts with a melancholic chordscheme on strings. (an edited, chopped up version of this chordscheme continues throughout the song during verses and the last chorus) It then leads into a similarly sad, string-laden first verse segment containing plaintive melodies. According to Gregory Adams of Exclaim!, the song "starts off smooth and ballady, with Azalea running through lines about her background, but soon drops into club-minded claps and screeching synths". A prominent synth, bass and drum-heavy production drop formula then occurs at the song's refrain, in which Azalea repeats the hook, "I been work work work work, workin' on my shit". The production drop casts Azalea's rapping against a combination of a Roland TR-808-heavy, minimal trap beat and EDM clapping effects. Using divisive Southern American English pronunciation, Azalea employs a defiant and rattling, staccato delivery in double-time. Her rapping pace varies from fast, intricate rhymes to slow, stretched-out singular words. While in the verses, her delivery is riddled with expletives.

The lyrics are autobiographical and portray Azalea's fame-seeking relocation from Mullumbimby to Miami at the age of 16, and deal with subjects of work ethic and dedication to craft. It specifically accounts for the events of Azalea growing up in Mullumbimby, juggling multiple occupations to save an income to independently start anew in Miami. The lyrics also serve as a celebration of Azalea's progression from being a struggling rapper as a rags to riches story and an underdog anthem. The line "Who don't know shit 'bout where I was made / Or how many floors that I had to scrub," was suggested to be directed at her "haters". While the couplet, "Two feet in the red dirt, school skirt, sugar cane, back lanes" is eloquent for Azalea's origin.

According to Jessie Schiewe of Respect., the lyrics also imply that Azalea "was swindled and take advantage of in her first record deal", and that it provides insight into events that have toughened Azalea up. While Cristina Jaleru of The Associated Press deduced that the lyrics "First deal changed me, robbed blind, basically raped me / Studied the Carters till a deal was offered, slept cold on the floor recording," are rapped "not as a complaint but as a badge of honor". Nick Aveling of Time Out writes that Azalea is depicted as a "hustler" and a "woman with immense ambition" in the song. In a NPR publication, Ann Powers viewed the lyrics to be of "unremitting toil", as well as detailing a story of Azalea "staying up night after night to master her flow". John Lucas of The Georgia Straight compared the lyrical content to that of Drake's "Started from the Bottom" (2013). According to Matt Jost of RapReviews.com, "Work" is similar to the works of 2 Live Crew and is a "nod to Miami's music history".

== Release ==
"Work" served as Azalea's debut single as a lead artist, and the lead single from The New Classic. Following its premiere on BBC Radio 1Xtra on 11 February 2013, Azalea tweeted, "Thanks for supporting me and I'm happy to have a first single about my story and not something meaningless i hope it inspires and motivates". Her label later announced that an extended play (EP) for the single would be released on 8 April 2013. Azalea posted a timed preview of "Work" on SoundCloud on 24 February 2013. The following day, Azalea announced on Twitter that the song would be digitally released within the first week of March 2013.

"Work" was released as a digital download on 17 March 2013 in the United Kingdom. A digital EP—which included remixes by Jacob Plant and Burns—was then made available on 7 April 2013. In the United States, the song impacted rhythmic contemporary radio on 25 June 2013. An official remix featuring American rapper Wale was premiered by Samsung on 28 June 2013. In the remix, Wale performs a 16-bar rap in place of Azalea's second verse in the song. The remix was well received by reviewers from Rap-Up, The Line of Best Fit, and XXL. A 13-track remix bundle and the Wale remix was then released in the United States on 16 and 23 July 2013 respectively.

== Critical reception ==
"Work" received universal acclaim from music critics. In a Billboard publication, Robert Christgau called the song "excellent" and "something [Azalea] wants us to remember", and commented: "You want authentic? Iggy Azalea has all the lineaments of a risk-taking young rebel without a well-off family to back her up." Christgau went on to praise the track's hooks, and explained: "The hooks, of course, are one reason hard die-hards put her down—in the truimpant Dirty South manner, her hip-hop is radio-friendly as a matter of principle. The cumulative weight of the long-player they never think about." Monica Herrera of Rolling Stone called the song "a bombshell-next-door move that demands attention". Matt Orkine of Triple J listed it as the year's ninth best single, and viewed it as a "straight-up banger" and his "guiltiest music pleasure of 2013". Kellan Miller of XXL deemed it "the song that made the world fall in love with Iggy all over again". Justin Monroe of Complex called it the album's "infectious and decidedly less weird first single", and complimented its ability to provide listeners with a sense of Azalea's background. While Sam Weiss of the same publication described the song "as wild and eccentric as anything she's done so far".

Slant Magazine's Joe Sweeney felt that "Work" was the album's standout track and believed that it portrayed a real sense of Azalea's potential as a storyteller, and commended her delivery, "You can hear every inch of how far she's come". Sweeney's view was shared by Andy Gill from The Independent who also named "Work" the highlight on The New Classic, and said Azalea's double-time delivery was best-employed on the song. HipHopDX's Marcus Dowling wrote that "Work" was "an extraordinarily well-rounded listen" and the "honest and intriguing greatness" of The New Classic. Dowling commented that the line, "No money, no family, 16 in the middle of Miami", provided an "ocean of depth [...] that makes the rest of the album feel like swimming in a kiddie pool". Matt Jost of RapReviews.com concurred, and called the song "the sure winner" and "lyrically most ambitious offering" of the album. Jost opined that the track was "memorable" and its production "cleverly subverts expectations", and explained, "It's when she keeps it simple and relies on her indeed present swagger that the Iggy Azalea character works best". Similarly, Alex Scordelis of Paper described the track as "the cornerstone" of the album and complimented its "insanely catchy chorus". Scordelis believed it marked a heightened evolution in Azalea's growth as a rapper, and stated, "['Work' is] a song you can easily imagine Azalea performing for years to come".

"Work" was positively reviewed by writers of Entertainment Weekly; Kyle Anderson opined that the track was "a thoroughbred entry in the song of summer race", while Ray Rahman called it a "bulletproof party banger". Devone Jones of PopMatters viewed Azalea's "sombre thought-processing" as "well-executed", and appreciated her for "picking gritty gangsta-pop [sic] beats over EDM and dance music as well as deciding to rap about her life before her new-found fame as opposed to her fame". Likewise, Craig Mathieson of The Sydney Morning Herald explained that the song highlighted Azalea's "ability to meld the club music sounds that are permeating American hip-hop and pop into something unexpected and affecting". In an October 2013 publication, Kitty Empire of The Observer wrote that "Work" was "ear-catching", and contained Azalea's "best-known zing"; "Valley girls giving blowjobs for Louboutins / What do you call that? / Head over heels?". In 2014, Nolan Feeney of Time said "Work" was "by far the best thing she's done", and highlighted Azalea's conviction and "rapid-fire" delivery, while Digital Spy's Lewis Corner felt the song "remains one of [Azalea's] finest moments". In 2015, NME ranked "Work" third in their list of Azalea's best songs, behind "Fancy" and "1 800 Bone".

== Commercial performance ==
Commercially, "Work" was a sleeper hit and Azalea's breakthrough into mainstream success. In Australia, the song bowed at number 88 on the ARIA Singles Chart issued for 23 April 2013, but re-entered more than a year later to peak at number 79 for the chart dated 9 June 2014. The track was certified gold by the Australian Recording Industry Association (ARIA) for selling 35,000 copies; it became one of the lowest peaking songs to receive a sales certification in the country. The track debuted at number 98 on the Irish Singles Chart dated 4 April 2013, and reached a peak of number 42. On the UK Singles Chart, the song entered at number 55 and peaked at number 17 in its sixth week. The song spent a total of 13 weeks on the chart. It was certified gold by the British Phonographic Industry (BPI) for selling over 400,000 units.

In the United States, "Work" first charted at number seven on the Bubbling Under R&B/Hip-Hop Singles chart issued for 20 July 2013. Following a 156% sales resurgence spurred by Azalea's appearance and nomination at the 2013 MTV Video Music Awards, the song debuted at number four on the Bubbling Under Hot 100 Singles chart. On 13 August 2013, Billboard reported that the track percolated below the Rhythmic chart. It was more successful on the Dance Club Songs chart where it peaked at number five for the week-ending 5 October 2013. In May 2014, the song received a second sales resurgence following the release of The New Classic and the success of Azalea's 2014 singles "Fancy" and "Problem". It went on to peak at number 54 on the Billboard Hot 100 where it accumulated a total of 20 weeks on the chart. The sales resurgence also saw the single attain a new peak of number 14 on the Hot R&B/Hip-Hop Songs chart, where it initially bowed at number 35 in September 2013. In September 2014, the track was certified platinum by the Recording Industry Association of America (RIAA) for sales of over 1 million units. In January 2015, Billboard named it one of the biggest hits to have peaked at number 54 on the Billboard Hot 100. In Canada, "Work" debuted on the Canadian Hot 100 at number 98 for the week-ending 27 September 2014, and reached a peak of number 87. It was certified gold by Music Canada (MC) for selling more than 40,000 copies.

== Music video ==
=== Background and development ===
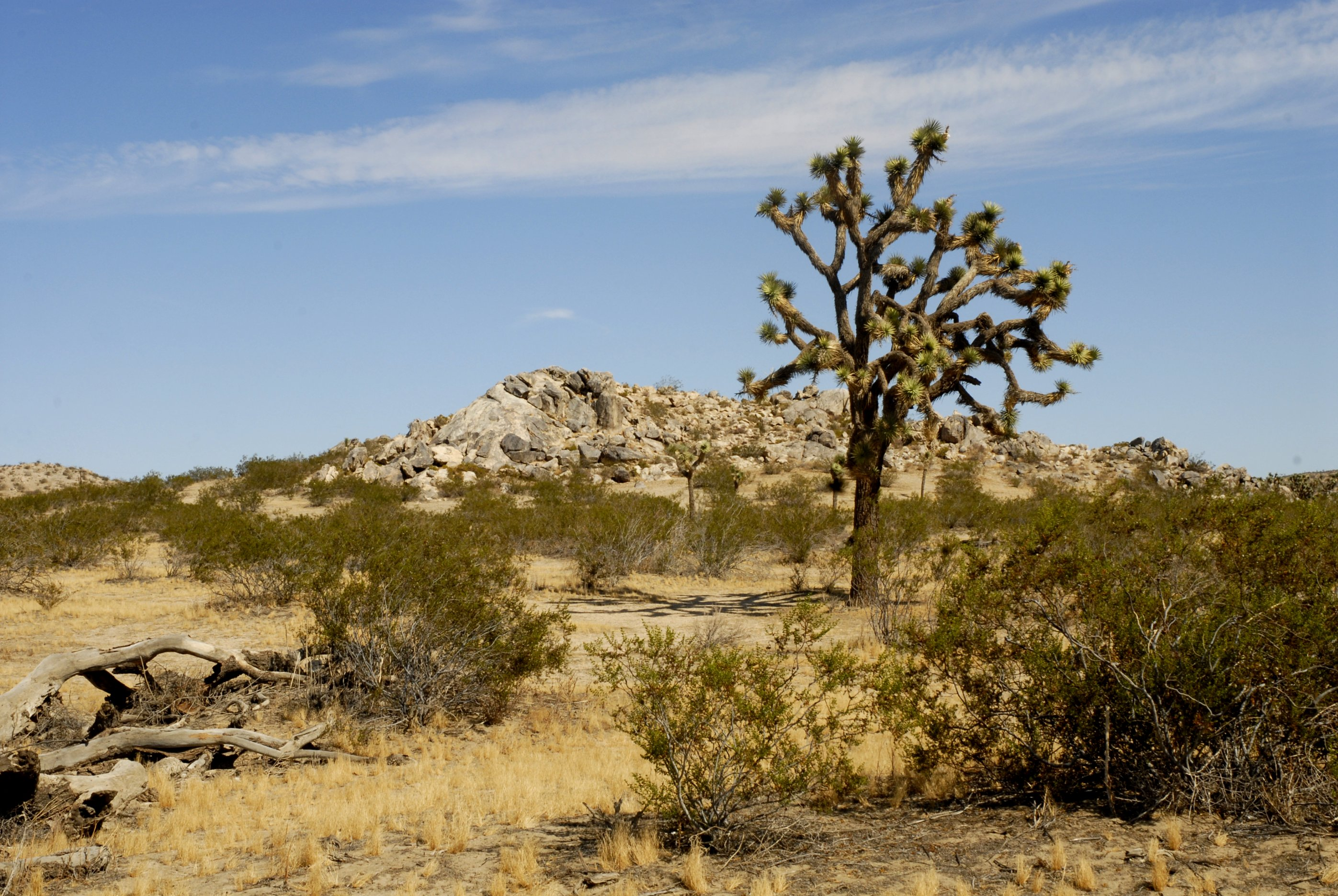
Some scenes in the music video were filmed in the Mojave Desert near the historical Easy Rest Inn.

The accompanying music video for "Work" was directed by Jonas & François and filmed in Hollywood and Lancaster, California, in February 2013. A budget of about $100,000 was used for the production. Initially, Azalea wanted to provide a literal representation of the song, and planned to shoot the clip in Australia, but time constraints prevented her from travelling to the country. Accordingly, a desert location was chosen to emulate Azalea's hometown, Mullumbimby. Prior to the video's filming, Azalea felt she grasped the concept of what made a good music video and what viewers wanted to see in the clip for "Work". In turn, she combined several different ideas into the visual because she feared that a music video budget of the same calibre would not arise in future.

One of Azalea's ideas was to pay homage to the Australian film The Adventures of Priscilla, Queen of the Desert (1994), as its theme of discrimination was one she identified with as a rejected and struggling rapper. Two scenes in the music video drew reference from the film: the fire swing segment emulated the film's bonfire scene, and the convertible segment represented the film's bus. Washed colour elements were also implemented into the convertible scene which was inspired by the 1998 film Fear and Loathing in Las Vegas. Another idea Azalea incorporated into the clip was the large-scale neon qualities featured in Outkast's music video for "B.O.B". Azalea stated that the featured lap dancing originated from Vanessa Ferlito's "infamous" scene of the same action in the 2007 film Death Proof. She found Ferlito's lap dance appealing, but was convinced to recreate it for "Work" after she noticed its popularity through remakes of it on YouTube.

Controversy arose during the music video's development when Azalea intended to wear a red, high-waisted leotard encrusted in rhinestone flames, to emulate the showgirl fashion featured in The Adventures of Priscilla, Queen of the Desert. The leotard, however, was deemed "too-vaginary" by one of the workers at the label Azalea was signed to, ultimately leading to the worker being dismissed from the project and the leotard being scrapped altogether. Azalea's final wardrobe consisted of creations by Christian Louboutin, Jeremy Scott and the 2013 Spring/Summer Collection by Dolce & Gabbana. Her stylist, Alejandra Hernandez incorporated several pairs of Louboutins into the music video because of their significance to Azalea when she was a struggling rapper who achieved her first sense of accomplishment after buying her first pair.

=== Synopsis ===
Azalea in a scene from the clip which pays homage to the 1994 film The Adventures of Priscilla, Queen of the Desert

The music video's storyline depicts Azalea's biographical journey from life on the streets to Hollywood. According to Natasha Stagg of American magazine V, the plot involves Azalea rising from "trailer park standby to high-class Hollywood-ite in a matter of minutes". The music video opens with Azalea confidently walking on a deserted highway situated in a desert environment. Azalea's costume includes dark red lipstick, red-soled vertiginous Louboutins, a powder blue Givenchy bag, a tropical print brassiere and shorts. The scene is intercepted with visuals of burning shoes and wheels. Azalea then walks through a trailer park community where several locals stare at her as she passes by. Upon the beginning of the song's chorus, the video transcends into a playground scene where Azalea dances in an evening setting, with a fire-lit swing as her backdrop. In this segment, she wears a grey crop top and red slim-fit pants, with her hair styled in a bun. The next scene involves Azalea performing in a dance-off with her two female friends in front of a Freightliner Truck. Azalea sports a plum-coloured fur coat over a white mesh swimsuit. In the segment, the three engage in twerking and hair flicking actions.

The visual then returns to the trailer park setting, where Azalea rides a lowrider bicycle through the area. She wears a perforated yellow visor, black brassiere, spiked yellow Louboutins and ethnic slim-fit pants. The video then enters a new scene where Azalea arrives at a dive bar and switches a jukebox on. At the bar, Azalea's two friends from the Freightliner Truck scene are seated at a table, and a long-haired man wearing dark sunglasses awaits her on a chair in the centre of building. Azalea, dressed in a palm tree bikini and yellow neon shorts, performs a lap dance for the man. She then steals his car keys and runs off with her friends, who drive the man's convertible out into the desert. Azalea is seen standing in the car, waving a thin piece of material in the wind. They drive through a day and night period before arriving in Hollywood in the morning. Azalea's friends then drop her off at a sidewalk, where the video ends with her walking in the city. She wears dark sunglasses, striped black-and-white shorts and a custom-made dalmatian-print blazer in the final scene.

=== Release and reception ===
On 4 March 2013, Azalea posted a set of images from the clip on Instagram. The music video was initially scheduled for release on 11 March 2013, though it premiered two days later on Vevo on 13 March 2013. A behind-the-scenes segment was released on 3 April 2013. An alternate video directed by Colin Solal Cardo for an unreleased Adidas commercial surfaced online on 12 April 2014.

Upon release, the music video was tagged with the warning "not suitable for work". It received praise from critics and was nominated for the MTV Video Music Award for Best New Artist at the 2013 ceremony, but lost to Austin Mahone's "What About Love". The visual also received three nominations at the 2013 UK Music Video Awards, in the categories for Best Styling in a Video, Vevo Best New Artist and Best Urban Video. Slant Magazine ranked the video at number 21 in their list of The 25 Best Music Videos of 2013; writer Sal Cinquemani stated that Azalea's swing set conjured that of Madonna's "Like a Prayer" (1989) and George Michael's "Freedom! '90". In France, the video was broadcast with blurring and a warning Not advised to kids under 10 years old (in French : déconseillé aux moins de 10 ans) during the day on some music channels while others chose to broadcast it after 10p.m with or without warning nor blurring following suggestive content and the lap dance scene, perceived as "too many explicit" for a day TV-broadcasting.

Shardae Jobson of The Source deemed Azalea's fashion "stylish" and "rustic". A writer for MuchMusic described the clip as "a total and complete visual trip jam-packed with Iggy's rad dance moves". Natasha Stagg of V called it a "desert dream" and appreciated Azalea's "killer outfit options". British magazine Fact wrote that the visual was "flashy" and "trailer park elegance", and compared it to M.I.A.'s "Bad Girls" (2012). Julian Rifkin of Oyster viewed it as "a high class production" and felt it emulated the song's lyric "Valley girls giving blow jobs for Louboutins". He likened the clip's dancing to that of Beyoncé, and Grimes' "Genesis" (2012). Rifkin considered the production's Mid West theme to recall Lana Del Rey's "Born to Die" (2011). Contactmusic.com said the music video told an inspiring story of Azalea working her way up from the bottom. Jessie Peterson of MTV News called Azalea's wardrobe "subtly savvy". Eric Diep of XXL stated that the clip was worth the wait, and described Azalea's "sexy poses and lap dances" as "just the tip of the iceberg". Diep praised Azalea's story interpretation, and mentioned, "Pledge allegiance to the struggle, this girl knows how to work it". Jessie Schiewe of Respect. complimented the video for revolving around Azalea and paying homage to the song's lyrical story, and praised the rapper's lap dancing scene. Kyle Anderson of Entertainment Weekly felt the video evoked the 1991 film Thelma & Louise and commended Azalea's "full run of frame-grab-worthy outfits". The music video has received over 280 million views on YouTube as of November 2017.

== Live performances ==
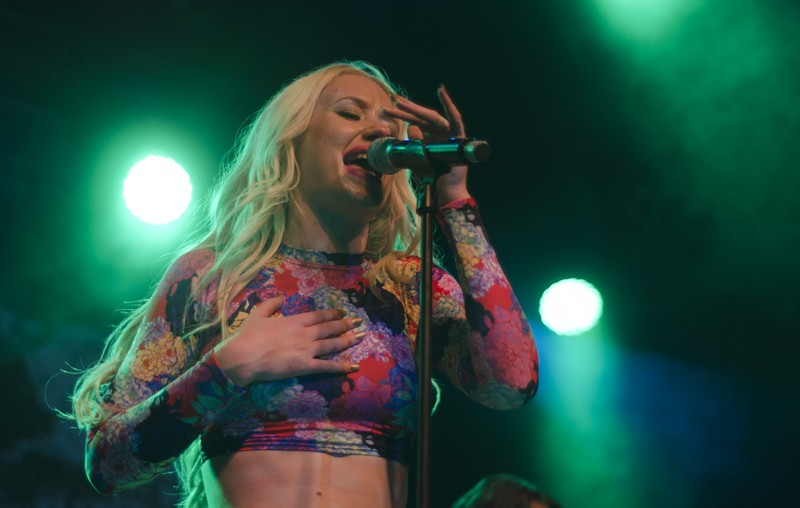
Azalea performing "Work" at Arena Wien in Vienna

Azalea first performed "Work" during the Manchester-stop of Rita Ora's Radioactive Tour on 29 January 2013. She reprised the song until the tour's final date in mid-February, before performing it again during the European leg of the Nas' Life Is Good Tour. Azalea went on to perform the song for her sets at The Great Escape Festival and Radio 1's Big Weekend in May 2013, and at Gucci's Chime for Change Concert, The Parklife Weekender and the Glastonbury Festival in June 2013. The song was then performed at the Wireless Festival, and London nightclubs G-A-Y and Fabric in July 2013. Azalea gave her first live televised rendition of "Work" on 8 August 2013 on Britain & Ireland's Next Top Model. As part of the single's promotion in the United States, Azalea performed "Work" on Nikki & Sara Live on 28 August 2013, and for KIIS FM on 14 September 2013. The song was also included in Azalea's set list at the 2013 iTunes Festival, where she was a supporting act for Katy Perry. In October 2013, Azalea performed the track as part of her sets during Beyoncé's The Mrs. Carter Show World Tour. At the 2013 MOBO Awards, Azalea performed "Change Your Life" and "Work".

In 2014, "Work" featured in the set list for Azalea's first headlining tour, The New Classic Tour. A number of the tour's renditions of the track featured an interpolation of RuPaul's "Supermodel", and a Miami strip-inspired stage backdrop as a reference to the song's "No money, no family, 16 in the middle of Miami" line. She also performed the song during her set for the 2014 MtvU Woodie Awards at South by Southwest in April. On 15 May 2014, Azalea performed the song on Jimmy Kimmel Live!. The rendition was praised by reviewers from Exclaim! and Vibe. On 8 August 2014, Azalea performed the song during her set on The Today Show. Jim Farber of the Daily News noted that the rendition "put the emphases on a pre-recorded beat and the star's personality", and that Azalea's "only whiff of pretence" during the set came in "a few lines in 'Work'". Azalea later included the song for her sets during the Jingle Ball Tour 2014. In 2015, Azalea performed "Work" as part of her set lists at the Redfest in February, and the Ottawa Bluesfest and Quebec City Summer Festival in July.

== Track listings ==
- Digital download
1. "Work" – 3:43
- Digital download (The Remixes)
1. "Work" (Gregor Salto Radio Edit) – 2:48
2. "Work" (Gregor Salto Remix) – 5:14
3. "Work" (Gregor Salto Instrumental) – 5:14
4. "Work" (Reid Stefan Radio) – 3:56
5. "Work" (Reid Stefan Radio)^{[a]} – 3:53
6. "Work" (Reid Stefan Trap Remix) – 4:50
7. "Work" (Reid Stefan Radio Instrumental) – 3:53
8. "Work" (Reid Stefan Trap Instrumental) – 4:50
9. "Work" (Tom Stephan Radio Mix) – 3:47
10. "Work" (Tom Stephan Mix) – 6:32
11. "Work" (DJ Reflex Remix)^{[a]} – 3:45
12. "Work" (DJ Reflex Remix) – 3:45
13. "Work" (DJ Reflex Remix Instrumental) – 3:45
- Digital download (EP)
1. "Work" – 3:43
2. "Work" (Radio Edit)^{[a]} – 3:42
3. "Work" (Jacob Plant Remix) – 3:16
4. "Work" (Burns Purple Rain Version) – 5:20
5. "Work" (Instrumental) – 3:40
- Digital download (Remix)
1. "Work" (featuring Wale) – 4:10

- ^{^a} signifies a clean version.

== Credits and personnel ==
- Iggy Azalea – writer, vocals
- The Invisible Men – writers, producers, drums, programming, keyboards
- Trocon Markous Roberts – writer
- Natalie Sims – writer
- 1st Down of FKi – producer, drums, programming, keyboards
- Anthony Kilhoffer – mixing
- Kyle Ross – mixing assistant

Credits adapted from the album's liner notes.

== Charts ==
=== Weekly charts ===
Chart (2013–2014)	Peak position
Australia (ARIA)	79
Australia Urban (ARIA)	8
Belgium (Ultratip Bubbling Under Flanders)	11
Belgium Urban (Ultratop Flanders)	26
Canada Hot 100 (Billboard)	87
Ireland (IRMA)	42
Lebanon (Lebanese Top 20)	10
Scottish Singles Sales (Official Charts)	18
UK Singles (Official Charts)	17
UK Hip Hop/R&B (Official Charts)	3
US Billboard Hot 100	54
US Dance Club Songs (Billboard)	5
US Hot R&B/Hip-Hop Songs (Billboard)	14
US Hot Rap Songs (Billboard)	7

=== Year-end charts ===
Chart (2013)	Position
Belgium Urban (Ultratop Flanders)	89
UK Singles (Official Charts Company)	128
Chart (2014)	Position
Australia Urban (ARIA)	32
US Hot R&B/Hip-Hop Songs (Billboard)	45
US Hot Rap Songs (Billboard)	29

== Certifications ==
Certifications for Work
Region	Certification	Certified units/sales
Australia (ARIA)	Gold	35,000^{^}
Brazil (Pro-Música Brasil)	2× Platinum	120,000^{‡}
Canada (Music Canada)	Gold	40,000^{*}
New Zealand (RMNZ)	Gold	15,000^{‡}
United Kingdom (BPI)	Gold	400,000^{‡}
United States (RIAA)	2× Platinum	2,000,000^{‡}
^{*} Sales figures based on certification alone.^{^} Shipments figures based on certification alone.^{‡} Sales+streaming figures based on certification alone.

== Radio and release history ==
Country	Date	Format	Label	Ref.
United Kingdom	17 March 2013	Digital download	Virgin EMI	
United Kingdom	7 April 2013	Digital download (EP)	Virgin EMI	
United States	25 June 2013	Rhythmic contemporary	Def Jam	
United States	16 July 2013	Digital download (The Remixes)	Def Jam	
United States	23 July 2013	Digital download (Remix)	Def Jam	
