= Handle with Care (Natalie Lauren album) =

Studio album by Natalie Lauren
- Released: July 17, 2020
- Recorded: Natalie Lauren's Home; Parhelion Recording Studios, Atlanta, Georgia
- Length: 33:55
- Label: Rostrum, Native North
- Producer: Carvello, John Smythe, Jordan Webb, Juice Bangers, Natalie Lauren, Swoope, Vindell Smith

Natalie Lauren chronology
Cliff Notes (2014)	Handle with Care (2020)

Singles from Handle with Care
- 1. "Meditate" Released: June 25, 2019; 2. "Something Something" Released: January 17, 2020; 3. "Just Breathe" Released: May 29, 2020; 4. "Back to Love" Released: June 19, 2020; 5. "Bra Off" Released: July 1, 2020

Handle with Care is the debut studio album by Christian hip hop artist and songwriter Natalie Lauren, released on July 17, 2020, through Rostrum Records and Native North. Five singles were released in advance of the album's release: "Meditate" on June 25, 2019, "Something Something" on January 17, 2020, "Just Breathe" on May 29, 2020, "Back to Love" on June 19, 2020, and "Bra Off", on July 1, 2020.

== Recording and release ==
For the recording of the album, Lauren worked closely with Swoope, a labelmate and music producer. Recording was done both at Lauren's home and at Parhelion Recording Studios in Atlanta. During the early stages of recording, Lauren was struggling with loss and confusion, which translated into her approaching the album as a form of therapy. On June 25, Lauren released the single "Meditate" through Rostrum Records. A second single, "Something Something", followed on January 17, 2020. A music video for "Something Something" was shot in Sims' hometown of Tulsa, and was released on February 28, 2020. A third single, "Just Breathe", was released on May 29, 2020. "Back to Love" followed on Juneteenth (June 19), 2020, about a month after being conceptualized by Lauren. On July 1, 2020, a fifth single was released from the album, entitled "Bra Off". Handle with Care was announced on July 3, 2020, and released on July 17, 2020, through Rostrum Records and Native North. A music video for "God Morning" was released on October 1, 2020.

== Lyrical themes ==
The overall concept of the album is that of inspiration and healing while also challenging perceptions of blackness. Lauren stated in a July 23, 2020, interview that "There are so many communities I am a part of and love. The Black community, followers of Jesus, LGBTQ community all play a significant role in my life and I want my music to be in support and love of them all through the arts." She described the album as a space where she and her listeners can simply be as they are without judgement. The song "White Noise" has been described as perhaps the most vulnerable track on the album. Lauren states that this song is "about God's silence towards me and how it felt like rejection and punishment for so long." While she struggled with resentment, she also learned to surrender to the silence she encountered. According to Lauren, "Something Something" was written for her mother and for anyone who is "unseen and tired." Lauren described the concept of "Back to Love" as "the first day of Black Summer" where black people can be safe in their own homes and celebrate their culture. "Bra Off" points out that women should not be subject to insult, assault, sexism, or sexualization when they do not wear a bra. It also, according to Lauren, calls on women to be content without "doing" and instead lend themselves moments to "remove our capes and all the superwoman roles we wear and to simply exist bare as women."

== Track listing ==
No.	Title	Writer(s)	Producer(s)	Length
1.	"God Morning"	Allen Swoope II, Natalie Lauren Sims, William James Lofton	Swoope	3:23
2.	"Something Something"	Swoope, John Smythe, Sims	Swoope and John Smythe	2:41
3.	"Get It Right"	Swoope, Sims, Lofton, William Josiah Howard Reeves	Swoope and Juice Bangers	3:02
4.	"Bra Off"	Swoope, Jasmine Mans, Sims	Swoope	2:56
5.	"Super Human"	Mans, Jaylon Ashaun, Sims, Ryan C. Bert, William Jackson	Carvello	2:10
6.	"Safe Place Interlude" (featuring Swoope)	Swoope, Sims	Swoope	3:33
7.	"Hard Part"	Smythe, Sims	John Smythe	1:50
8.	"White Noise"	Jordan Webb, Sims, Vindell Elijiah Smith	Vindell Smith and Jordan Webb	3:06
9.	"One Million Reasons"	Swoope, Sims	Swoope	3:35
10.	"Meditate"	Swoope, Sims, Lofton	Swoope	2:12
11.	"Back to Love"	Swoope, Sims, Jackson	Natalie Lauren and Swoope	2:49
12.	"Happy Tears"	Swoope, Sims	Swoope	2:38
Total length:				33:55

- Tracklist credits adapted from liner notes and Tidal

== Credits and personnel ==
Adapted from liner notes and Tidal

- Natalie Lauren: Primary artist, song-writing, A&R, album artwork, recording and engineering, production on "Back to Love"
- Swoope: Album production, song-writing
- Carvello: Production on "Super Human"
- Juice Bangers: Production on "Get It Right"
- John Smythe: Production on "Something Something" and "Hard Part"
- Jordan Webb: Production on "White Noise"
- W. J. Lofton: Production on "God Morning", song-writing on "Get It Right" and "Meditate"
- Vindell Smith: Production on "White Noise"
- Billy Jackson: Song-writing on "Super Human" and "Back to Love"
- Jasmine Mans: Song-writing on "Bra Off"
- Ryan C. Bert: Song-writing on "Super Human"
- Jaylon Ashaun: Song-writing on "Super Human"
- William Josiah Howard Reeves: Song-writing on "Get It Right"
- Ralph Cacciurri: Recording and engineering
- Miles Walker: Album mixing
- Jacob “Biz” Morris: Mixing on "Meditate"
- John Kercy: Mixing on "Back to Love" and "Bra Off"
- Colin Leonard: Mastering
- Shawna Peezy Spears: Management
