= Church Clap =

Song by KB featuring Lecrae

from the album Weight & Glory
- Released: July 17, 2012
- Recorded: 2012
- Genre: Christian hip hop
- Length: 3:17
- Label: Reach Records
- Songwriters: Kevin Burgess; Lecrae Moore; Natalie Sims; John Williams; Joseph Prielozny
- Producer: Cheesebeats (a.k.a. Tha Kracken)

Music video
- Video on YouTube

"Church Clap" is a song by American Christian rapper KB featuring fellow American Christian rapper Lecrae. It was released for KB's debut album, Weight & Glory. It was produced by Cheesebeats (a.k.a. Tha Kracken) for Reach Records. It was written by Kevin Burgess (KB), Lecrae Moore, Natalie Sims, John Williams, and Joseph Prielozny. The song was released on July 17, 2012, along with the album. Currently, it is KB's only song to receive certification by the Recording Industry Association of America (RIAA).

== Reception ==
It was praised for blending hip hop and gospel music. In the 2020s, a dance featuring the song went viral on social media, causing an increase in people streaming the song. It was ranked 10 on Rapzilla's "Top 15 Most Streamed Christian Rap Songs of the Decade" list. It has been used as the walk-up song for Major League Baseball players Yan Gomes and Tommy Field.

== Certifications ==
Region	Certification	Certified units/sales
United States (RIAA)	Gold	500,000^{‡}
^{‡} Sales+streaming figures based on certification alone.
