= Talented 10th =

Studio album by Sho Baraka
- Released: January 15th, 2013
- Genres: Christian hip hop, conscious hip hop
- Length: 57:48
- Labels: Lions and Liars
- Producers: Ali, Blue, J.R., Sho Baraka, Swoope, theBeatBreaker

Sho Baraka chronology
Lions and Liars (2010)	Talented 10th (2013)	The Narrative (2016)

Singles from Talented 10th
- 1. "Chapter 6: Ali" Released: January 2, 2013; 2. "Chapter 9: Jim Crow" Released: January 12, 2013

Audio sample
- The song "Chapter 9 - Jim Crow" was controversial in Christian media due to Sho Baraka's use of strong language in dealing with racism.: file; help

Talented 10th is the third studio album by American Christian hip hop artist Sho Baraka, released through his own label, Lions & Liars Music, on January 15, 2013. It is the first solo release by Sho Baraka since he left Reach Records in 2011. The album title and concept was based on the 1903 essay of the same name by W. E. B. Du Bois. Talented 10th is "not just a picture of Christian salvation but also focuses on education, relationships and social change - all filtered through a biblical worldview." However, Talented 10th was controversial with some in the Christian scene due to the appearance of strong language on the song "Chapter 9 - Jim Crow".

== Background ==
According to Sho Baraka, the album title and concept was based on the essay Talented Tenth by W. E. B. Du Bois. He explained that within the past year he had been challenged by the African-American professor and theologian Anthony Bradley to move away from Christian literature and theology and read more sociology. In an interview with Wade-O Radio, he explained:

I've always loved W.E.B. Du Bois and Frederick Douglass, and I started reading books about them and the struggle of slavery, post-slavery and the African American plight. Then I stumbled upon Du Bois' Talented 10th, the book he wrote, and it spoke exactly to where I am. Where you have a group of people who are struggling, who are in pain, whether it be economic, physical or spiritual, but you have people around who have answers, resources, gifts, talents who can help those individuals.
And so the whole concept of the album is, based on the book, is kind of like people who have time, talent and treasure using those gifts to the benefit of other folks. Not just teaching men to be carpenters, but teaching carpenters to be men.

— Sho Baraka, Wade-O Radio

In another interview on the Wade-O Radio Show, Sho Baraka explained that his motivation for the album was frustration not just with Christian music but with Christendom and the issues that are ignored and not addressed. He said that in addition to the essay Talented Tenth, he was inspired by the anthology Preaching With Sacred Fire: An Anthology of African American Sermons, 1750 to the Present by Martha Simmons and Frank A. Thomas. Sho Baraka expressed his frustration that because of their fascination with Martin Luther, John Calvin, and Charles Spurgeon, many artists and pastors do not talk about black Christian leaders such as Absalom Jones and Lemuel Haynes. From Talented Tenth and Preaching With Sacred Fire, Sho Baraka delved into books such as The New Jim Crow by Michelle Alexander, Invisible Man by Ralph Ellison, and The Hobbit by J. R. R. Tolkien, along with various works by authors such as Phyllis Wheatley, Frederick Douglass, August Wilson, and C. S. Lewis.

== Reception ==
=== Controversy ===
Talented 10th met with controversy in Christian media due to the use of strong language on the album. The song "Chapter 9 - Jim Crow", which deals with racism, received particular attention for Sho Baraka's use of the word nigga in the chorus "I guess I'm stuck here on Nigga Island" and the line "that lady you call hoe that's my lover / that woman you call bitch that's my mother." Sho Baraka expressed that he was aware that his use of the words would be controversial, stating that the song was originally titled "Nigga Island", but he changed the title to "Jim Crow" as he realized that many people might be uncomfortable mentioning the song with its original title. He also released the physical version of the album as a "clean" version, where he uses the word colored instead of nigga. In an interview with Rapzilla, Sho Baraka explained that in the song, he is rebuking the use of the terms nigga, hoe, and bitch, not endorsing them.

J.F. Arnold of The Christian Manifesto stated that "I'm hesitant with the use of this sort of language in a public platform, primarily for the witness we are to have to the world. But I'm not willing to condemn Sho for this decision: it's one I haven't made, and one I probably wouldn't make, but one I can understand." Michael Weaver of Jesus Freak Hideout was committedly more negative, explaining that "perhaps the most offensive part of the entire song isn't the ugly words Sho uses, but the fact that he states that black men are used only to be exploited by white men and to help them reach their goals. Sho paints with a very broad and hurtful brush. Perhaps it should be hurtful to some, but it should not be all-encompassing."

The song "Chapter 7 - Denzel", where guest feature Suzy Rock drops the line "cause she don't think she sexy cause she's showin' her ass / ask me no questions I tell you know lies", was also viewed as potentially offensive. Calvin Moore and J. F. Arnold of The Christian Manifesto noted that despite the use of strong language in "Chapter 9 - Jim Crow", the song "Chapter 8 – Madoff" is perhaps the most incendiary track, as according to them the song's stance on economic policy and the abuse of wealth may offend fiscal conservatives and Republicans.

Wil Addison of DaSouth that he initially had reservations about the album title due to the elitism of the original "Talented Tenth" term used by DuBois, as well as DuBois' partnership for Margaret Sanger and disparaging remarks toward pastors in the black church. However, he was reassured by a Twitter conversation with Sho Baraka, in which Sho Baraka stated that "'There was an assumption of an elitist bent. However I don't communicate partiality nor would I ever but I do feel like todays [sic] exceptional folks should engage in the discipleship/mentoring process instead of worrying about their own careers/platforms. Benefit of other.'" This was reiterated in an interview with Wade-O Radio where Sho Baraka stated that there was no elitest intention behind the album. Edward Shelton of DaSouth posted an article in which he discussed his feelings on the album. He expressed a mixed opinion over Sho Baraka's use of language and opinions on racial and social issues. In regard to language, he stated that he appreciated how Sho Baraka attacks the terms nigga, hoe, and bitch, but at the same time was frustrated that Sho Baraka could not find a better way to communicate his message and avoid using the word nigga. Shelton was highly appreciative that Sho Baraka addressed social stereotypes that Shelton felt are not talked about enough, but felt that there were stereotypes that Sho Baraka should have addressed but did not. Shelton stated: "I never thought I'd hear a Christian hip hop record challenging the ideas of the 'Magical Negro,' pimp, coon, and 'Token Negro' roles that are forged in Hollywood and in literature. As thankful as I am for that, I would have liked for Sho to address the 'Suzy Q," 'Sapphire,' and 'Mammy' stereotypes as well." Similar to Michael Weaver of Jesus Freak Hideout, Skelton criticized Sho Baraka for giving too general a view of white males. Skelton explained that "the mistake Sho commits is that he fails to separate the category of 'white men' from 'rich people who exploit.'" In the conclusion of his essay, Skelton expressed his view that "in the end, this album is not for everyone – which is fine. There is no rule in music that it has to reach or be for everyone. I think that is a lesson Christian hip hop is overdue to learn. I do not know what doors this will open outside of the church, but I hope it points those people to Christ."

=== Critical response ===
Professional ratings
Review scores
Source	Rating
Allmusic	3.5/5 stars
The Christian Manifesto	4.5/5
Christian Music Zine	4.75
DaSouth	5/5 stars
Jesus Freak Hideout	2.5/5 stars 4.5/5 stars
Rapzilla	4/5 stars

Critical reception to Talented 10th was generally positive. J.F Arnold of The Christian Manifesto scored the album four-point-five out of five, and said that "highlights of the album include, well, just about every track on the album, save 'Mrs…' and 'ME!'", concluding that "this is Sho Baraka's strongest release. With few missteps, the album deserves to be listened to. It will cause controversy, but I want to make one thing clear: sometimes it can be easy to disagree with someone for their message, or perhaps their methods, but in this case, regardless of my conclusion, Sho Baraka's earned my respect." In the "Dual Impressions" session of a podcast of The Christian Manifesto, Nick Ahern agreed with Arnold and also gave the album afour-point-five out of five rating. Anthony Peronto of Christian Music Zine gave the album four-point-seventy-five out of five, stating that "without a doubt Sho Baraka's best album, Talented 10th is a challenging out-of-the-box project that is sorely needed in Christian hip hop." Nyon Smith of Rapzilla rated the album four out of five and concluded that "the album does fall flat in certain areas, such as 'Mrs..'... ..and 'Nicodemus'... But overall the process or reinvention has been surprisingly seamless. While his sophomore album Lions and Liars was remarkable, at times it felt as though Sho was holding back, trying not to lend heart to a passion that might fall on deaf ears. Talented 10th follows the same principle of the W.E.B. Dubois' essay for which the album was named: Education must not simply teach work - it must teach Life."

Aubrey McKay of Wade-O Radio was highly positive and said that on Talented 10th Sho Baraka managed to bring back "real hip-hop". McKay concluded that "there is really no other record out there like this one. That is often said in hip-hop, but is never more applicable than now. When listening to this record, listen with an open mind and you will be satisfied. It is phenomenal music with an even better message. This is Sho Baraka at his best in every way possible. Talented Xth is challenging, empowering, political, social, theological and lyrical. It is truly great. It is hip-hop. There is really no other record out there like this one. That is often said in hip-hop, but is never more applicable than now. When listening to this record, listen with an open mind and you will be satisfied. It is phenomenal music with an even better message. This is Sho Baraka at his best in every way possible. Talented Xth is challenging, empowering, political, social, theological and lyrical." Wil Addison of DaSouth rated the album a perfect score, declaring it "is not only CHH, classic it's classic hip hop."

David Jeffries of Allmusic rated the album three-point-five out of five and described it an "ambitious, big ball of worship and revolution." With regard to the song "Chapter 9 - Jim Crow", Jeffries called the use of a racial slur on the track a revolutionary inclusion for Christian hip hop which makes the album a CCM release that parents will want to talk to their kids about before they listen to it. Jeffries concluded his review by stating "that said, Sho Baraka's writing is in top form, all the elaborate productions are on point, and his heartfelt performances here suggest he feels his art would be blunted if he compromised. Even if Talented 10th is controversial, from Sho Baraka's angle, it's 'true talk' and if it ruffles some feathers, that's exactly what it was designed to do."

However, critical opinion on the website Jesus Freak Hideout was divided. Michael Weaver viewed the album negatively and rated it two-point-five out of five stars. In addition to voicing his objection to the language and message of "Chapter 9 - Jim Crow", Weaver stated that "overall, Talented 10th is a mediocre release that is written heavily for a particular audience. There's nothing wrong with being proud of your racial heritage, or writing songs about it, but in doing so, one runs the risk of alienating others. The album falls short of the work that Sho Baraka has done on Reach Records or with the 116 Clique. There are indeed a few tracks worthy of repeating, but the album as a whole comes up short." In contrast, Scott Fryberger was highly positive in his review and rated the album four-point-five out of five stars, stating that "there's so much depth to Talented 10th that a review couldn't cover it all without taking a liberal amount of space. Check out Sho Baraka's latest offering, and see if you don't go back to each track and try to get something new out of it again."

=== Commercial performance ===
The album debuted at No. 108 on the Billboard 200 chart, No. 1 on the Gospel Albums chart, No. 5 on the Christian Albums chart, No. 12 on the Rap Albums chart, and No. 16 on the Independent Albums chart.

== Intro message ==
The album opens with a spoken message in Afrikaans. The message as credited by South African producer Jeremy Koeries (better known as J.K. from Exilic Music), transcribes as: "Ten spyte van ons lyding en in die midde van ons pyn, staan daar een wat bekend is met lyding, en Hy's gewilling om vir ons te genees: Jesus Christus." Following the album's release, J.K. provided clarification for this on Twitter; roughly translating it into English as: "despite our suffering and in the midst of our pain, there stands One who is acquainted with suffering, and He is willing to heal us: Jesus Christ."

== Track listing ==
No.	Title	Producer(s)	Length
1.	"Chapter 1: Bethesda" (featuring J.K. and L.I.B.E.R.T.Y.)	Blue, co-produced by Sho Baraka	4:33
2.	"Chapter 2: Michael"	Swoope	3:57
3.	"Chapter 3: Get Happy Intermission"		0:51
4.	"Chapter 4: Mahalia" (featuring Duce Banner)	Swoope	4:48
5.	"Chapter 5: Mrs..." (featuring J.R.)	Ali	3:22
6.	"Chapter 6: Ali" (featuring Ali)	Ali	3:44
7.	"Chapter 7: Denzel" (featuring Chantae Cann and Suzy Rock)	theBeatBreaker	3:46
8.	"Chapter 8: Madoff"	Blue	4:44
9.	"Chapter 9: Jim Crow"	Ali	5:22
10.	"Chapter 10: Peter Pan"	Ali	4:05
11.	"Chapter 11: Cliff & Claire" (featuring Christon Gray)	Swoope	5:20
12.	"Chapter 12: ME!" (featuring Lee Green and Theory Hazit)	theBeatBreaker	3:43
13.	"Chapter 13: King" (featuring Lizi Bailey and Tedashii)	theBeatBreaker	4:33
14.	"Chapter 14: Nicodemus" (featuring Diamone)	J.R.	5:00

Extended edition tracks
No.	Title	Length
15.	"Epilogue 1: Hello Change"	2:58
16.	"Epilogue 2: KJPJ"	3:44
