= HillaryJane =

American Christian musician (born 1993)

- Birth name: Hillary Jane Ashton Stiles
- Also known as: HillaryJane
- Born: September 25, 1993 (age 31); Palo Pinto, Texas, U.S.
- Origin: Houston, Texas, U.S.
- Genres: Christian pop, Christian R&B, Christian hip hop, contemporary R&B
- Occupation(s): Singer, songwriter
- Instrument(s): Vocals, piano
- Years active: 2014–present
- Labels: Infiltrate
- Website: infiltratemusic.com/artists/hillaryjane/

Hillary Jane Ashton Stiles (born September 25, 1993) is an American Christian musician, who primarily plays a Christian R&B, Christian hip hop, and a Christian pop style of music. She has released two extended plays, Stix and Stones and Stix and Stones Unplugged, both in 2014, with Infiltrate Music.

== Early and personal life ==
Stiles was born, Hillary Jane Ashton Stiles, on September 25, 1993, in Palo Pinto, Texas, the daughter of Duane Michael and Debbie Kay Stiles (née, Johnson). She was raised in Houston, Texas, where she considers it to be her hometown. Stiles got engaged in late 2015 to Roman Flores. They got married in 2016 and now reside in Los Angeles, California.

== Music career ==
HillaryJane started her music career in 2009, performed in 2014 at South by Southwest, and with the release, Stix and Stones, an extended play, on July 29, 2014, with Infiltrate Music. Her subsequent extended play, Stix and Stones Unplugged, was released on December 30, 2014, by Infiltrate Music.

== Discography ==
EPs

- Stix and Stones (July 29, 2014, Infiltrate)
- Stix and Stones Unplugged (December 30, 2014, Infiltrate)
