= KB (rapper) =

American rapper

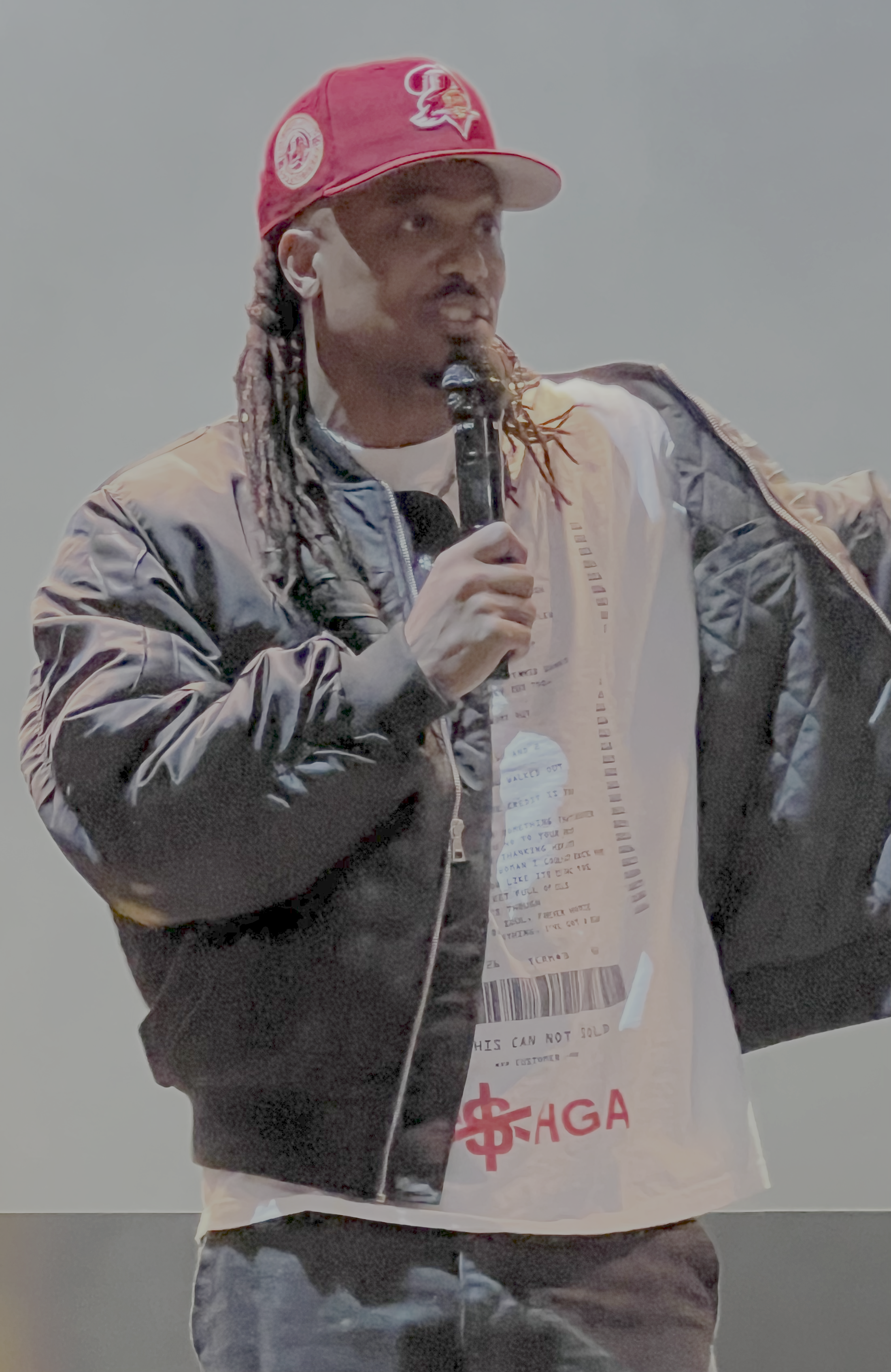
- KB in 2026

Background information
- Also known as: KB, K to the Second Letter, Moreno Papi Loco, KB the Second
- Born: Kevin Elijah Burgess; July 21, 1988 (age 38); St. Petersburg, Florida, U.S.
- Genre: Christian hip hop
- Occupation: Rapper
- Years active: 2006–present
- Labels: Reach, Native North, Essential Sound
- Website: whoiskb.com

Kevin Elijah Burgess (born July 21, 1988), better known by his stage name KB, is an American Christian rapper and music executive from St. Petersburg, Florida. He is the leader of the hip-hop group HGA (His Glory Alone). Burgess signed a solo artist contract with Reach Records in 2010. The label has released several projects, including the Who Is KB? mixtape in 2011, Weight & Glory, on July 17, 2012, 100 EP on March 4, 2014, Tomorrow We Live on April 21, 2015, and Today We Rebel on October 20, 2017. He was formerly a member of the label collective formerly 116 clique shortened to 116.

He left Reach Records in 2020 and signed with Essential Sound, releasing his fourth studio album, His Glory Alone in 2020 as well as its sequel His Glory Alone II in 2023.

== Biography ==
=== Early life ===
Kevin Elijah Burgess was born in St. Petersburg, Florida, on July 21, 1988, into a military family. Shortly after his birth, his parents moved to Southern Illinois. When he was eight years old, his parents divorced, and he moved back with his mother to the south side of St. Petersburg, which, according to Burgess, is "probably one of the worst areas in the state." Although he excelled at a good school and was offered a path to college through a program at St. Petersburg Collegiate High School, he struggled with severe depression. He experimented with various drugs in an attempt to find relief, which negatively affected his performance at school and led him into a downward spiral, even contemplating suicide.

=== Formation of HGA ===
After high school, Burgess enrolled in Trinity College of Florida, where he befriended a group of Christian rappers. They formed a hip-hop group called HGA, short for His Glory Alone. HGA eventually caught the interest of Lecrae, Ben Washer, and DJ Official, and was featured alongside Tedashii on the track "Go" from DJ Official's album Intermission. Burgess was invited onto the Acquire the Fire tour by Lecrae and was asked to join the Reach Records team just a few months later.

=== The Reach Records Years ===
Burgess signed with Reach Records in 2010 and appeared that year on Lecrae's album Rehab. His mixtape Who Is KB? followed a year later, along with appearances with PRo and Tedashii. Who Is KB? garnered 30,000 downloads by the following year. His first single, "Hello," featuring Suzy Rock, was released in October 2011. In January 2012, he released a second single, "Zone Out," featuring Chris Lee Cobbins. Burgess also appeared with Andy Mineo on Trip Lee's album The Good Life. In June 2012, he released a third single, "Go Off," featuring Tedashii and Andy Mineo. Burgess's debut album, Weight & Glory, was released a month later and featured the song "Church Clap" featuring Lecrae, his only RIAA certified song.

On May 30, 2013, Reach Records announced a four-part project entitled 1st and 16th. This project involved Burgess releasing a new song on the first and sixteenth of June and July. On June 1, Part 1, "HCB Freestyle," was released. The songs "Ride" and "Be All Right" were also part of the 1st and 16th project.

On February 10, 2014, KB announced his new project, an EP titled 100, which was released on March 4, 2014. Burgess also appeared in Family Force 5's music video for the song "BZRK," released on May 23, 2014, as a featured artist.

On February 3, 2015, KB announced on social media his second studio album, Tomorrow We Live, including the cover and release date, which was set for April 21, 2015. The first single from the album, "Sideways," featuring Lecrae, was released on February 23, 2015. The second single, "Crowns & Thorns (Oceans)," was released on March 10, 2015.

On October 20, 2017, KB released his third studio album, Today We Rebel. The first single from the album, "Tempo," was released a year prior to the album's release. The second single, "Monster," featuring Aha Gazelle, was released on September 15, 2017.

=== The Essential Sound Years ===
In 2020, he announced that he would not be renewing his contract with Reach Records and instead signed with Essential Sound, a Sony Music imprint.

KB released three singles—"Armies," "10K," and "Lil Boy"—from his fourth studio album, His Glory Alone. The album was released on September 25, 2020.

On August 11, 2023, KB released his fifth studio album, His Glory Alone II. The album was preceded by five singles: "King Jesus" with nobigdyl., "Graves" with Brandon Lake, "EZ," "Glory 2 Glory," and "Danza." It was followed by a deluxe edition featuring five new tracks.

== Personal life ==
Burgess is married to his wife, Michelle, and they have three children.

== Discography ==
=== Studio albums ===
Year	Title	Chart positions				
Year	Title	US	US Gospel	US Christ.	US Indie	US Rap
2012	Weight & Glory: Released: July 17, 2012; Label: Reach	34	1	1	9	4
2015	Tomorrow We Live: Released: April 21, 2015; Label: Reach	18	—	1	2	4
2017	Today We Rebel: Released: October 20, 2017; Label: Reach	91	—	1	8	—
2020	His Glory Alone: Released: September 25, 2020; Label: Essential Sound	—	—	4	—	—
2023	His Glory Alone II: Released: August 11, 2023; Label: Provident Label Group	—	—	4	—	—
2026	This Cannot Be Sold: Released: July 10, 2026; Label: Provident	—	—	24	—	—
"—" denotes a recording that did not chart or was not released in that territory.
Note: Beginning in 2015, Billboard rendered most hip hop/rap songs ineligible for the Gospel charts

=== Collaboration albums ===
Year	Title	Chart positions	
Year	Title	U.S. Gospel	U.S. Christ.
2011	Man Up (with 116 Clique): Fourth studio album; Released: September 28, 2011; Label: Reach	—	—
"—" denotes a recording that did not chart or was not released in that territory.

=== EPs ===
Year	Title	Chart positions				
Year	Title	US	US Gospel	US Christ.	US Ind.	US Rap
2014	100: 1st EP; Released: March 4, 2014; Label: Reach	22	1	1	3	4
"—" denotes a recording that did not chart or was not released in that territory.

=== Mixtapes ===
Year	Title
2011	Who Is KB?: 1st mixtape; Released: March 22, 2011; Label: Reach

=== Multimedia series ===
Year	Title	Publisher
2013	1st & 16th	Reach

=== Singles ===
==== As lead artist ====
Year	Title	Chart positions		Certifications	Album
Year	Title	US Christ.	US Gospel	Certifications	Album
2011	"Hello" (featuring Suzy Rock)	—	—		Weight & Glory
2012	"Zone Out" (featuring Chris Lee Cobbins)	—	—		Weight & Glory
2012	"Go Off" (featuring Tedashii & Andy Mineo)	—	—		Weight & Glory
2014	"100" (featuring Andy Mineo)	31	18		100
2015	"Sideways" (featuring Lecrae)	29	—		Tomorrow We Live
2015	"Crowns & Thorns (Oceans)"	31	—		Tomorrow We Live
2015	"Ima Just Do It" (featuring Bubba Watson)	37	—		Tomorrow We Live
2016	"Tempo"	48	—		Today We Rebel
2017	"HomeTeam" (featuring Lecrae)	—	—		non-album single
2017	"Monster" (featuring Aha Gazelle)	39	—		Today We Rebel
2018	"No Chains"	30	—		non-album single
2018	"Long Live the Champion" (featuring Yariel and GabrielRodriguezEMC)	—	—		non-album single
2018	"Die Rich" (featuring Ray Emmanuel)	—	—		non-album single
2019	"DNOU2"	—	—		non-album single
2019	"Hold Me Back"	29	—		non-album single
2019	"Lincoln"	43	—		non-album single
2020	"Armies"	28	—		His Glory Alone
2020	"10K"	30	—	RIAA: Gold	His Glory Alone
2020	"Lil Boy"	41	—		His Glory Alone
2021	"Worship In The Moshpit"	—	—		non-album single
2022	"King Jesus" (featuring nobigdyl.)	—	—		His Glory Alone II
2022	"Graves"	33	—		His Glory Alone II
2023	"EZ"	31	—		His Glory Alone II
2023	"Glory 2 Glory"	—	—		His Glory Alone II
2023	"Danza" (featuring Nico Eme, Cardec Drums.)	—	—		His Glory Alone II
2025	"God Did" (with Rua Young)	—	—		Non-album singles
2026	"Got a Reason" (with Nobigdyl)	—	—		Non-album singles
"—" denotes a recording that did not chart or was not released in that territory.
Note: Beginning in 2015, Billboard rendered most hip hop/rap songs ineligible for the Gospel charts

==== As featured artist ====
Year	Title	Chart positions		Album
Year	Title	US Christ	US Pop	Album
2011	"116" (PRo featuring KB)	—	—	non-album single
2013	"Passing" (Json featuring Serge and KB)	—	—	Braille
2013	"All In" (Flame featuring KB)	—	—	Royal Flush
2014	"BZRK" (Family Force 5 featuring KB)	34	—	Time Stand Still
2015	"Northern Sky" (Capital Kings feat. KB)	—	—	II
2017	"O God Forgive Us" (For King & Country featuring KB)	14	—	Run Wild. Live Free. Love Strong.
2020	"Smoke Free" (Bizzle)	—	—	The Messenger 4
2021	"Can't Tell It All (Remix)" (Hulvey feat. KB & Lecrae )	—	—	non-album single
2025	"Yes" (Steven Malcolm featuring KB and For King & Country)	—	33	Non-album single
2026	"Go! Go! Go!" (Forrest Frank featuring KB and Lecrae)	29	—	The Jesus Generation
"—" denotes a recording that did not chart or was not released in that territory.

=== Other charted and certified songs ===
Year	Title	Chart positions		Certifications	Album
Year	Title	US Christ.	US Gospel	Certifications	Album
2012	"Church Clap" (featuring Lecrae)	—	—	RIAA: Gold	Weight & Glory
2013	"The Saints" (Andy Mineo featuring KB & Trip Lee)	44	18		Heroes for Sale
2014	"Paganini" (Andy Mineo featuring KB & Canon)	46	21		Never Land
2014	"Undefeated" (featuring Derek Minor)	39	21		100
2014	"Earthquake" (Tedashii featuring Dimitri McDowell & KB)	—	22		Below Paradise (Deluxe Edition)
2015	"I Believe" (featuring Mattie)	38	—		Tomorrow We Live
2017	"DNOU"	45	—		Today We Rebel
2017	"Not Today Satan" (featuring Andy Mineo)	32	—		Today We Rebel
2026	"Too Unfazed:	50	—		This Cannot Be Sold
"—" denotes a recording that did not chart or was not released in that territory.

=== Guest appearances ===
Title	Year	Other performer(s)	Album
"Used to Do It Too"	2010	Lecrae	Rehab
"Full Court Mess"	2011	Pro	Dying to Live
"Young"	2011	Andy Mineo	Formerly Known
"You Know What it Is"	2011	Tedashii, PK	Blacklight
"One Sixteen"	2012	Trip Lee, Andy Mineo	The Good Life
"Fuego"	2012	Lecrae, Suzy Rock	Gravity (iTunes edition)
"The Saints Remix"	2012	Black Knight, Andy Mineo, Trip Lee	#ItsTheBlackKnight Beat Tape
"King of the World"	2014	Flame, V.Rose, Mike Real, Nico Wells	Jesus or Nothing
"For Those Who Can't Speak"	2014	Tenth Avenue North, Derek Minor	Cathedrals
"I Wouldn't Know"	2016	Lecrae	Church Clothes 3
"Prove It"	2016	Crowder	American Prodigal
"Back Soon"	2021	1K Phew, Parris Chariz	What's Understood
"Blessed"	2021	JStu, Hyper Fenton	Summer's Back

=== Music videos ===
==== As lead artist ====
Title	Year	Director	Views
"Zone Out" (featuring Chris Lee Cobbins)	2012	—N/a	3.1M
"HCB Freestyle"	2013	Will Thomas	576K
"Heart Song" (featuring Jasmine Leshea)	2013	—N/a	610K
"100" (featuring Andy Mineo)	2014	Squint	5.9M
"Kamikaze" (featuring Prisca)	2014	—N/a	1.3M
"Sideways" (featuring Lecrae)	2015	Kyle Dettman	8.7M
"Drowning"	2016	Sam Brave	2M
"Tempo"	2016	—N/a	2.6M
"DNOU"	2017	Sam Brave	1.7M
"Not Today Satan" (featuring Andy Mineo)	2018	Nathan Corrona	3.2M
"No Chains"	2018	—N/a	16M
"Long Live The Champions" (featuring Yariel, GabrielRodriguezEMC)	2018	Juan Garcia	9.1M
"Die Rich" (featuring Ray Emmanuel)	2018	—N/a	1.8M
"Hold Me Back"	2019	—N/a	5.2M
"10k"	2020	Juan Garcia	10M
"Lil Boy"	2020	—N/a	1.3M
"Dark Skin"	2021	—N/a	198K
"Libre" (featuring Tommy Royale)	2021	—N/a	1.8M
"Masterpiece"	2021	—N/a	1M
"This Is Life"	2021	—N/a	1.1M
"Worship In The Moshpit"	2021	—N/a	1.4M
"So Tired"	2021	—N/a	554K
"King Jesus" (featuring nobigdyl)	2022	—N/a	3.7M
"Graves" (featuring Brandon Lake)	2022	Joan Garcia	1.9M
"Graves - Acoustic" (featuring Brandon Lake)	2022	—N/a	523K
"EZ"	2023	—N/a	1M
"Glory 2 Glory"	2023	—N/a	1.9M
"Danza" (featuring Nico Eme, Cardec Drums)	2023	—N/a	2.2M
"Miracles" (featuring Lecrae)	2023	—N/a	3.4M
"It Ain't Safe"	2024	—N/a	328K
"Friends" (featuring Ty Brasel)	2024	—N/a	82K

==== As featured artist ====
Title	Year	Director
"Young" (Andy Mineo featuring KB)	2012	Kyle Dettman
"One Sixteen" (Trip Lee featuring KB and Andy Mineo)	2012	—N/a
"BZRK" (Family Force 5 featuring KB)	2014	Ryan Hamblin

== Awards and nominations ==
Year	Organization	Nominee / work	Category	Result	Ref.
2025	We Love Awards	"God Did II" (Rua Young featuring KB)	Rap / Hip Hop Song of the Year	Won	
2025	We Love Awards	"Yes" (with Steven Malcomb and For King & Country)	Collaboration of the Year	Nominated	
2026	Dove Awards	"God Did II" (Rua Young featuring KB)	Rap/Hip Hop Recorded Song of the Year	Nominated	
2026	Dove Awards	"Yes" (Steven Malcolm featuring For King & Country and KB	Rap/Hip Hop Recorded Song of the Year	Nominated	
2026	Dove Awards	"Campaign"	Short Form Music Video of the Year	Nominated	
