= Casey J =

American singer

- Born: Casey Janice Hobbs; June 29, 1986 (age 40)
- Origin: Atlanta, Georgia, United States; University of Georgia
- Genres: Gospel
- Occupations: Singer; Teacher
- Instrument: Vocals

Casey Janice Hobbs (born June 29, 1986), known professionally as Casey J, is an American gospel singer best known for her cover of the Will Reagan song "Fill Me Up", which reached number 1 on the Billboard Gospel chart.

== Early life ==
Casey J is a native of Atlanta, Georgia. A self-proclaimed "flower child" and vegetarian, she attributes her creativity to her father, who died when she was five years old. Casey J recalls, "He was a carpenter by trade, very smart and creative". Both her mother and grandmother sang in the gospel choir at Lilly Hill Baptist Church in Atlanta, and Casey J attended her grandmother's basement Bible studies as a child. "I used to think it was the normal way of life because that's all I saw my grandmother and mother do," she once said. "I grew up thinking that singing in the church choir is what all kids did because it was my way of life."

At the age of 12, Casey J joined the Atlanta Young Singers of Callanwolde and sang with them until she enrolled at the University of Georgia. After graduating, she became an elementary school math teacher at Georgia Connections Academy Charter School in Duluth, Georgia, and sang as a worship leader at Fresh Start Church in Duluth on Sunday mornings.

== Career ==
Casey J began to sing Will Reagan's tune "Fill Me Up" at Fresh Start Church and it received such a positive response that the church's pastor, Marquis Boone, decided to have Casey J record the song. It was released to the radio in spring 2014. It hit the top ten of the US Billboard Gospel Airplay chart that spring and reached the number 1 spot in 2015. Casey J has been described by The Chicago Defender as "gospel's newest darling".

The song "Fill Me Up" is featured on Casey J's debut album, The Truth, released April 21, 2015, by Tyscot Records. The album has reached number 1 on the Billboard Top Gospel Albums chart and 131 on the US Billboard 200. The Truth was recorded live on January 30, 2015, at the Fresh Start Church.

== Artistry ==
Casey J says she wants her music to be "imperfect" and not overproduced. Her music has been described by The New York Times as deviating slightly from the Gospel norm: "a little less thundering funk and abrupt style-switching, and a little more acoustic guitar; a little less prescriptive real-talk, and a little more contemplative interior monologue".

== Discography ==
=== Albums ===
Title	Album details	Peak chart positions			
Title	Album details	US 200	US Gospel	US Ind.	US Christian/ Gospel
The Truth	Released: April 21, 2015; Label: Tyscot Records; Format: CD, digital download	131	1	11	4

“The Gathering" Released: January 25, 2019

=== Singles ===
Title	Year	Peak chart positions				Album
Title	Year	US Gospel	US Gospel Airplay	US Adult R&B	US Gospel Digital	Album
"Fill Me Up"	2015	1	1	27	2	The Truth
"I'm Yours"	2016	5	1	—	12	The Truth
