= Swoope =

American rapper

- Born: Lawrence Allen Swoope II; April 2, 1986 (age 40); Akron, Ohio, U.S.
- Genres: Christian hip hop; urban contemporary gospel
- Occupations: Singer; rapper; songwriter; record producer; record executive
- Years active: 2010–present
- Labels: Collision (2009–2016); Independent (2016–present)
- Website: swoopemusic.com

Lawrence Allen Swoope II, mononymously-known as Swoope, (born April 2, 1986) is an American hip hop Christian singer-songwriter and producer born and raised in Akron, Ohio. He was a member of the rap collective W.L.A.K. and High Society with Sho Baraka.

== Background ==
Swoope was born Lawrence Allen Swoope II on April 2, 1986, in Akron, Ohio. His mother, Diana Lynn Swoope (née, Cook), was the Pastor for Arlington Church of God, also in Akron. His father is Lawrence Allen Swoope I.

== History ==
His career started off in 2010 with the release of the EP Applause Vol. 1 and the single "Actions Speak Louder". On April 24, 2011, Swoope released an EP entitled Spring Fling. On June 15, 2011, he released Spring Fling Instrumentals. On February 8, 2012, Swoope released the EP Boys R Us. His debut studio album, entitled "Wake Up," was released on March 20, 2012, with Collision Records. His Sinema album was released on August 5, 2014, also with Collision Records. He also independently released two mixtapes, "The Zoo" and "A.I.R.: The Abstract Intellect Revolution" After the release of Sinema, Swoope followed up with a free EP on October 10, 2014, called "Because You Asked." On February 5, 2016, it was announced that Swoope had left Collision Records. He then independently released Sonshine on February 2, 2018. The album went through three iterations where Swoope dealt with depression and his thoughts as a black man in America before finding new meaning and hope in his faith.

Swoope's song "Beauty and the Beast" was made the iTunes Single of the Week for the week of August 5, 2014.

== Discography ==
=== Studio albums ===
List of studio albums, with selected chart positions
Title	Album details	Peak chart positions				
Title	Album details	US	US CHR	US Gos	US Ind	US Rap
Wake Up	Released: March 20, 2012; Label: Collision; Formats: CD, digital download	—	10	6	31	23
Sinema	Released: August 5, 2014; Label: Collision; Formats: CD, digital download	55	3	1	6	4
Sonshine	Released: February 2, 2018; Label: Native No./Empire; Formats: CD, digital download	—	13	—	24	—
