= The Cross Movement discography =

This is the discography of the Cross Movement. Recently, The Cross Movement's HIStory: Our Place In His Story album received a Stellar Award nomination for "CD of the Year" and "Rap/Hip-Hop/Gospel CD of the Year".

All of the Cross Movement's albums, aside from their Greatest Hits album, start with the letter "H"

== Discography ==
=== Albums ===
Year	Album
1997	Heaven's Mentality: 1st studio album; Released: 1997
1999	House of Representatives: 2nd studio album; Released: 1999
2000	Human Emergency: 3rd studio album; Released: October 31, 2000
2003	Holy Culture: 4th studio album; Released: April 22, 2003
2004	Higher Definition: 5th studio album; Released: October 26, 2004; Grammy Award Nomination
2006	Chronicles (Greatest Hits, Vol. 1): Released: August 22, 2006
2007	HIStory: Our Place in His Story: Last group album; Released: June 5, 2007; 1 Stellar Award nominations; 1 Grammy Award Nomination

=== Compilation albums ===
Year	Album
2004	Gift Rap: The Cross Movement & Friends; Christmas Album; Released: October 26, 2004
2005	WhyHipHop?: Various Artists; Released: April, 2005
2006	WhyHipHop? 2K6: Various Artists; Released: May 23, 2006

=== Guest appearances ===
- "The Jesus Anthem" by Da' T.R.U.T.H.
- "It's the S.O.I." by KJ-52
