= Everyday Process: The Process of Illumination & Elimination =

Studio album by Everyday Process
- Released: March 20, 2007
- Genre: Christian hip hop
- Label: Cross Movement
- Producer: So Hot Productions; Mac the Doulos; Official

Professional ratings
Review scores
Source	Rating
Rapzilla	link

Everyday Process: The Process of Illumination & Elimination is the first solo album by Christian hip hop group Everyday Process. It was released by Cross Movement Records on 20 March 2007. The album was CMR's first release in 2007.

== Track listing ==
1. "Intro (Straight To The Point)"
2. "Build Up"
3. "Resist The System"
4. "Give 'Em The Gospel"
5. "Grace"
6. "All I Need" (ft. La'Tia & Keran)
7. "Amazed"
8. "Bangin' Defined" (Interlude)
9. "Bangin'"
10. "Holla At Me" (ft. Trip Lee)
11. "Live It Up"
12. "The After Party" (Interlude)
13. "The After Party"
14. "As Real As It Gets"
15. "Hey Girl" (ft. Badia Jeter & J.R.)
16. "The World Needs Jesus"
17. "Shine Bright"
18. "Illumination & Elimination" (Interlude)
19. "Everyday All Day Cypha" (ft. Lecrae, FLAME, R-Swift, The Ambassador & Phanatik)
