= List of awards and nominations received by Lecrae =

Lecrae awards and nominations
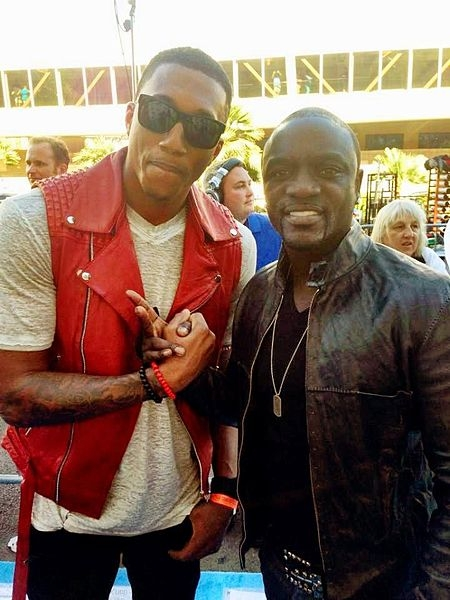
- Lecrae (left) and Akon (right) at the 2013 Billboard Music Awards
Awards and nominations
Award	Wins	Nominations
BET	3	2
BET Hip Hop	0	3
Billboard	1	4
Grammy	4	11
Soul Train	4	1
GMA Dove Awards	10	31
Stellar Awards	4	5
Libera Awards	1	5

Totals (Note: Certain award groups do not simply award one winner. They acknowledge several different recipients, have runners-up, and have third place. Since this is a specific recognition and is different from losing an award, runner-up mentions are considered wins in this award tally. For simplification and to avoid errors, each award in this list has been presumed to have had a prior nomination.)
- Wins: 28
- Nominations: 63

Lecrae is an American Christian hip hop artist. His career began in 2004 when he and Ben Washer co-founded the record label Reach Records. In 2007 his first album, Real Talk (2005), received a nomination at the Stellar Awards and his second album, After the Music Stops (2007), was nominated at the GMA Dove Awards. The following year Lecrae's third album, Rebel, became the first Christian hip hop album to chart at number one on the U.S. Billboard Gospel Albums Chart. In 2011 his fourth album, Rehab (2010), received a Grammy nomination for Best Rock Gospel Album. That year Lecrae began achieving mainstream success and recognition after he collaborated with DJ Statik Selektah on the song "Live & Let Live" and performed at the 2011 BET Hip Hop Awards Cypher. The following year he garnered two GMA Dove awards: Rap/Hip Hop Album of the Year for Rehab: The Overdose (2011) and Rap/Hip Hop Recorded Song of the Year for "Hallelujah" (2011). He also released the mixtape Church Clothes and the studio album Gravity, the latter of which of has been called the most important album in Christian hip hop history by Rapzilla and Atlanta Daily World.

In 2013, Lecrae became the first hip hop artist to win the Grammy Award for Best Gospel Album for his sixth album Gravity. In the same year the album won Rap/Hip Hop Album of the Year at the GMA Dove Awards, and a Stellar Award for Rap, Hip Hop Gospel CD of the Year. In 2015, he received the Grammy Award for Best Contemporary Christian Music Performance/Song for "Messengers" (2014), Artist of the Year, Rap/Hip-Hop Song of the Year, and Rap/Hip-Hop Album of the Year at the Dove Awards, a Stellar Award for Rap, Hip Hop Gospel CD of the Year, and a Billboard Music Award for Top Christian Album for Anomaly (2014). The same year he became the first rapper to win a BET Award for Best Gospel Artist. Anomaly also topped the Gospel charts and the U.S. Billboard 200, the first album to ever top both charts simultaneously. In 2017, the song "Can't Stop Me Now (Destination)" won the BET Dr. Bobby Jones Best Gospel/Inspirational Award, and the following year he won the same award for his single "I'll Find You" featuring Tori Kelly. The music video to "I'll Find You" also won a Dove Award for Short Form Video of the Year. The song "Deep End", from Restoration (2020), won the Dove Award for Best Rap/Hip Hop Song at the 2021 awards. In 2021 he collaborated with 1K Phew for the mixtape No Church in a While, which won Best Rap/Hip Hop Gospel Album at the 2022 Stellar Awards and Best Rap/Hip Hop Album at the 2022 Dove Awards. His fourth mixtape, Church Clothes 4 (2022), won Best Rap/Hip Hop Album at the 2023 Dove Awards and Best Contemporary Christian Music Album at the 2024 Grammy Awards. His 2023 single "Your Power", in collaboration with Tasha Cobbs Leonard, won Best Contemporary Christian Music Performance/Song at the 2024 Grammy Awards. In total, Lecrae has won twenty-seven awards and received an additional fifty-five nominations.

== BET Awards ==
The BET Awards were established in 2001 by BET to honor African Americans and other minorities in entertainment. The awards are determined by a voting academy made up of 150 music and media industry experts, bloggers, and fans. Lecrae has received three awards for the Dr. Bobby Jones Best Gospel/Inspirational Award (formerly the Best Gospel Artist Award) out of five nominations. His win in 2015 was the first time that a rapper had won the Best Gospel Artist award.

Year	Nominee / work	Award	Result	Ref.
2013	Lecrae	Best Gospel Artist	Nominated	
2015	Lecrae	Best Gospel Artist	Won	
2016	Lecrae	Best Gospel Artist	Nominated	
2017	"Can't Stop Me Now (Destination)"	Dr. Bobby Jones Best Gospel/Inspirational Award	Won	
2018	"I'll Find You" (featuring Tori Kelly)	Dr. Bobby Jones Best Gospel/Inspirational Award	Won	
2026	"Headphones" (with Killer Mike and T.I.)	Dr. Bobby Jones Best Gospel/Inspirational Award	Won	

== BET Hip Hop Awards ==
The BET Hip Hop Awards, first broadcast by BET in 2006, honor the best in hip hop for the year. The awards are determined by a voting academy made up of journalists, music industry experts, and fans. Lecrae has received three nominations.

Year	Nominee / work	Award	Result	Ref.
2014	"Nuthin'"	Best Impact Track	Nominated	
2017	"Blessings" (featuring Ty Dolla $ign)	Best Impact Track	Nominated	
2018	"I'll Find You" (featuring Tori Kell)	Best Impact Track	Nominated	

== Billboard Music Awards ==
The Billboard Music Awards are sponsored by the Billboard magazine and are based on consumer statistics including album and digital singles sales, radio airplay, touring, and streaming, as well data on social interaction with music on various social media platforms. These metrics are tracked year-round by Billboard and associated data partners such as Nielsen SoundScan and Next Big Sound. Lecrae has received one award win out of four Billboard Music Award nominations.

Year	Nominee / work	Award	Result	Ref.
2013	Gravity	Top Christian Album	Nominated	
2015	Anomaly	Top Christian Album	Won	
2015	Lecrae	Top Christian Artist	Nominated	
2018	"I'll Find You" (featuring Tori Kelly)	Top Christian Song	Nominated	

== GMA Dove Awards ==
A Dove Award is an accolade by the Gospel Music Association (GMA) of the United States to recognize outstanding achievement and excellence in the Christian music and Gospel music industries. It was first awarded in 1969. Lecrae has won twelve awards out of forty nominations.

Year	Nominee / work	Award	Result	Ref.
2007	After the Music Stops	Rap/Hip Hop Album of the Year	Nominated	
2007	"Jesus Muzik" (featuring Trip Lee)	Rap/Hip Hop Recorded Song of the Year	Nominated	
2009	Rebel	Rap/Hip Hop Album of the Year	Nominated	
2009	"Joyful Noise" (Flame featuring Lecrae and John Reilly)	Rap/Hip Hop Recorded Song of the Year	Nominated	
2011	Rehab	Rap/Hip Hop Album of the Year	Nominated	
2011	"Background" (featuring C-Lite)	Rap/Hip Hop Recorded Song of the Year	Nominated	
2012	Lecrae	Artist of the Year	Nominated	
2012	Rehab: The Overdose	Rap/Hip Hop Album of the Year	Won	
2012	"Hallelujah"	Rap/Hip Hop Recorded Song of the Year	Won	
2012	"Overdose"	Rap/Hip Hop Recorded Song of the Year	Nominated	
2013	Lecrae	Artist of the Year	Nominated	
2013	Gravity	Rap/Hip Hop Album of the Year	Won	
2013	"Tell the World" (featuring Mali Music)	Rap/Hip Hop Recorded Song of the Year	Won	
2013	"I'm Good" (Trip Lee featuring Lecrae)	Rap/Hip Hop Recorded Song of the Year	Nominated	
2014	Lecrae	Artist of the Year	Nominated	
2014	"Help"(Erica Campbell featuring Lecrae)	Gospel Performance of the Year	Nominated	
2014	"Dear Mr. Christian" (Derek Minor featuring Dee-1 and Lecrae)	Rap/Hip Hop Recorded Song of the Year	Nominated	
2015	Lecrae	Artist of the Year	Won	
2015	Lecrae	Contemporary Christian Artist of the Year	Nominated	
2015	"All I Need is You"	Rap/Hip-Hop Song of the Year	Won	
2015	"Sideways" (KB featuring Lecrae)	Rap/Hip-Hop Song of the Year	Nominated	
2015	Anomaly	Rap/Hip-Hop Album Of The Year	Won	
2015	"Messengers" (featuring For King & Country)	Rock/Contemporary Song Of The Year	Nominated	
2015	Anomaly	Recorded Music Packaging	Nominated	
2016	Lecrae	Artist of the Year	Nominated	
2016	Church Clothes 3	Rap/Hip Hop Album of the Year	Nominated	
2016	"Can't Do You" (featuring E-40)	Rap/Hip Hop Recorded Song of the Year	Nominated	
2018	"Blessings" (featuring Ty Dolla Sign)	Song of the Year	Nominated	
2018	"I'll Find You" (featuring Tori Kelly)	Song of the Year	Nominated	
2018	Lecrae	Songwriter of the Year	Nominated	
2018	"I'll Find You" (featuring Tori Kelly)	Short Form Video of the Year	Won	
2019	"Fight for Me" (Gawvi featuring Lecrae)	Rap/Hip Hop Recorded Song of the Year	Won	
2019	"Get Back Right" (with Zaytoven)	Rap/Hip Hop Recorded Song of the Year	Nominated	
2019	Let the Trap Say Amen (with Zaytoven)	Rap/Hip Hop Album of the Year	Nominated	
2020	"Set Me Free" (featuring YK Osiris)	Rap/Hip Hop Recorded Song of the Year	Nominated	
2021	"Deep End"	Rap/Hip Hop Recorded Song of the Year	Won	
2021	"Reasons" (Hulvey featuring Lecrae and Svrcina	Rap/Hip Hop Recorded Song of the Year	Nominated	
2021	Restoration	Rap/Hip Hop Album of the Year	Nominated	
2022	No Church in a While (with 1K Phew)	Rap/Hip Hop Album of the Year	Won	
2022	"Wildin" (with 1K Phew)	Rap/Hip Hop Song of the Year	Nominated	
2023	"Spread the Opps"	Rap/Hip Hop Song of the Year	Nominated	
2023	"Jireh (My Provider)" (Limoblaze featuring Lecrae and Happi)	Rap/Hip Hop Song of the Year	Nominated	
2023	Church Clothes 4	Rap/Hip Hop Album of the Year	Won	
2023	"Spread the Opps"	Short Form Music Video of the Year (Concept)	Nominated	
2024	"Miracles" (KB featuring Lecrae)	Rap/Hip Hop Recorded Song of the Year	Nominated	
2026	"Bless You"	Rap/Hip Hop Recorded Song of the Year	Pending	
2026	Reconstruction	Rap/Hip Hop Album of the Year	Pending	
2026	Reconstruction	Recorded Music Packaging of the Year	Pending	

== Grammy Awards ==
The Grammy Awards are awarded annually by the National Academy of Recording Arts and Sciences in the United States to honor excellence in the recording arts and sciences. A panel of over 150 industry experts screen the nominations, from which the winners are determined by Academy voting members. Lecrae has won four Grammy awards out of ten nominations. His win in 2013 for Best Gospel Album was the first such for a hip hop artist.

Year	Nominee / work	Award	Result	Ref.
2011	Rehab	Best Rock Gospel Album	Nominated	
2013	Gravity	Best Gospel Album	Won	
2015	"All I Need Is You"	Best Rap Performance	Nominated	
2015	"Messengers" (featuring For King & Country)	Best Contemporary Christian Music Performance/Song	Won	
2015	"Help" (Erica Campbell featuring Lecrae)	Best Gospel Performance/Song	Nominated	
2020—2021	"Come Together" (Rodney Jerkins featuring Tim Bowman Jr., Joy Enriquez, Kirk Franklin, Kelontae Gavin, Fred Hammond, Heavenly Joy, Le’Andria Johnson, Lecrae, Mary Mary, Jac Ross, Marvin Sapp, Karen Clark Sheard, Kierra Sheard, and Shelby 5)	Best Gospel Performance/Song	Nominated	
2020—2021	"Sunday Morning" (featuring Kirk Franklin)	Best Contemporary Christian Music Performance/Song	Nominated	
2024	"Your Power" (with Tasha Cobbs Leonard)	Best Contemporary Christian Music Performance/Song	Won	
2024	Church Clothes 4	Best Contemporary Christian Music Album	Won	
2026	"Headphones"	Best Contemporary Christian Music Performance/Song	Nominated	
2026	Reconstruction	Best Contemporary Christian Music Album	Nominated	

== Stellar Awards ==
The Stellar Awards is an awards show that honors artists, writers, and other industry professionals in Gospel music, produced by Central City Productions. Members of the Stellar Awards Gospel Music Academy submit nominations, verify the eligibility of nominations, and vote for winners in the first ballot. Starting in 2012, the second and final ballot is available to the public, who determine the final four entries for each category and decide on a winner within that category. Lecrae has received six Stellar Award nominations, of which he has won three awards.

Year	Nominee / work	Award	Result	Ref.
2007	Real Talk	Rap, Hip Hop Gospel CD of the Year	Nominated	
2010	Rebel	Rap, Hip Hop Gospel CD of the Year	Nominated	
2012	Rehab	Rap, Hip Hop Gospel CD of the Year	Nominated	
2012	Rehab: The Overdose	Rap, Hip Hop Gospel CD of the Year	Won	
2014	Gravity	Rap, Hip Hop Gospel CD of the Year	Won	
2015	Anomaly	Rap, Hip Hop Gospel CD of the Year	Won	
2022	1K Phew and Lecrae	Duo/Chorus Group of the Year	Nominated	
2022	No Church in a While	Rap/Hip Hop Gospel Album of the Year	Won	
2022	"One Call"	Rap/Hip Hop Song of the Year	Nominated	
2026	Reconstruction	Rap/Hip Hop Gospel Album of the Year	Pending	
2026	"Headphones"	Rap/Hip Hop Song of the Year	Pending	

== Soul Train Music Awards ==
The Soul Train Music Awards are produced by the variety television program Soul Train. Awards are determined by a panel consisting of over five hundred individuals in the music, media, and blogging industries. Lecrae has received four Soul Train awards out of five nominations.

Year	Nominee / work	Award	Result	Ref.
2013	"Confessions"	Best Gospel/Inspirational Performance	Nominated	
2014	"Help" (Erica Campbell featuring Lecrae)	Best Gospel/Inspirational Song	Won	
2015	"All I Need Is You"	Best Gospel/Inspirational Song	Won	
2017	Lecrae	Best Gospel/Inspirational Award	Won	
2018	Lecrae	Best Gospel/Inspirational Award	Won	

== Libera Awards ==
The Libera Awards are an annual awards ceremony organized by the American Association of Independent Music (A2IM). First hosted in 2012, the awards celebrate the independent music community. The capstone of A2IM's Indie Week, an annual music business conference, the ceremony has been able to be viewed by the public since 2020. The top-billed awards are generally Record of the Year and Best Live Act, in addition to Label of the Year, Best Sync Usage, and Video of the Year, among others. In addition to the awards which are voted on, A2IM annually confers the Lifetime Achievement and Independent Icon Awards to industry leaders and artists, respectively.

Year	Nominee / work	Award	Result	Ref.
2021	"Restoration"	Best Spiritual Record	Nominated	
2023	"Church Clothes 4	Best Spiritual Record	Nominated	
2024	"Your Power" featuring Tasha Cobbs Leonard	Best Spiritual Record	Nominated	
2025	"Die for the Party"	Best Spiritual Record	Nominated	
2026	"Reconstruction"	Best Spiritual Record	Won	
