= Holy Culture =

Studio album by The Cross Movement
- Released: April 22, 2003
- Genre: Christian hip hop
- Label: Cross Movement Records

The Cross Movement chronology
Human Emergency (2000)	Holy Culture (2003)	Higher Definition (2004)

Holy Culture is the 4th album from the Christian hip hop group the Cross Movement, released on April 22, 2003. Includes The Ambassador, Phanatik, Tonic and Tru-Life. Produced by Kevin Arthur, Lee Jerkins, Official, The Tonic and Virgil Byrd.

== Music videos ==
A music video was made for the song "When I Flow"

== Track listing ==
No.	Title	Length
1.	"Holy Culture"	4:55
2.	"When I Flow (It's Gospel)"	4:18
3.	"Interlude: Industry"	0:44
4.	"In Not Of"	5:13
5.	"It's Going Down"	3:06
6.	"Interlude: Cats Know"	1:13
7.	"Free"	5:11
8.	"Forever"	5:14
9.	"Cry No More"	4:26
10.	"Start Somethin’"	3:02
11.	"Times Table"	2:52
12.	"Interlude: Medicine"	0:35
13.	"Rise Up"	4:35
14.	"Driven"	4:39
15.	"Closer to You" (feat. J.R.)	4:04
16.	"L.L.R.P."	4:11
17.	"Live It"	3:38
18.	"Interlude: Laborers"	0:47
19.	"Eternal Cypha" (feat. Da’ T.R.U.T.H., J-Silas, Todd Bangz, R-Swift, & FLAME)	5:45
20.	"DJ Official Speaks"	0:39
21.	"Interlude: H.C. Panel Discussion"	5:41
