= Gift Rap =

Compilation album by The Cross Movement & Friends
- Released: October 26, 2004
- Genre: Christian hip hop
- Label: Cross Movement Records

Gift Rap is a Christmas compilation album released by Cross Movement Records on October 26, 2004. The album features artists associated with the label as well as guest performers.

It was re-released in October 2006 with new cover artwork.

== Track listing ==
1. "Tell You Why" – Da' T.R.U.T.H.
2. "Came Down" – The Ambassador feat. La'Tia & Keran
3. "Happy Birthday to Who?" – The Tonic feat. Ron J
4. "Read the Book" – J. Johnson feat. Michelle Bonilla
5. "On This Day" – J.R.
6. "Love Does" – Phanatik feat. Ruth Gado
7. "The King’s Speech" – M.O.D.
8. "Invasion Day" – FLAME
9. "Different Kind of Christmas" – T.R.U.-L.I.F.E.
10. "Wisemen" – The Cross Movement
