= Human Emergency =

Studio album by The Cross Movement
- Released: October 31, 2000
- Genre: Christian hip hop
- Label: Cross Movement Records

The Cross Movement chronology
| House of Representatives (1998) | Human Emergency (2000) | Holy Culture (2003) |

Professional ratings
Review scores
| Source | Rating |
|---|---|
| Allmusic | link |

Human Emergency is the third album from the popular Christian hip hop group the Cross Movement, released on October 31, 2000. It included The Ambassador, EarthQuake, Enock, Phanatik and Tonic.

== Music video ==
A music video was made for the song "Know Me".

== Track listing ==
| No. | Title | Length |
|---|---|---|
| 1. | "Intro - Dispatch (We Called You)" | 1:03 |
| 2. | "The Light (The Blazin' One)" (feat. The Ambassador and Da’ T.R.U.T.H.) | 4:36 |
| 3. | "Hold it Down" (feat. John Wells - The Tonic) | 4:01 |
| 4. | "C to the R" (feat. Phanatik) | 4:41 |
| 5. | "On the Move" | 3:57 |
| 6. | "Know Me (Huh, What?)" | 4:38 |
| 7. | "In Route (Interlude)" (feat. John Wells - The Tonic) | 1:05 |
| 8. | "What Do You See?" (feat. The Ambassador) | 5:25 |
| 9. | "Love Life" (feat. John Wells - The Tonic and Phanatik) | 4:25 |
| 10. | "Come in London (Interlude)" | 0:43 |
| 11. | "Lord?" | 4:31 |
| 12. | "Creature Double Feature" (feat. John Wells - The Tonic) | 4:41 |
| 13. | "Somebody Help! (Interlude)" | 1:01 |
| 14. | "On Right Now" | 4:07 |
| 15. | "All Day" (feat. Phanatik) | 3:56 |
| 16. | "Remember" | 4:11 |
| 17. | "Live Agua" (feat. John Wells - The Tonic) | 4:48 |
| 18. | "To My Peoples" | 3:17 |
| 19. | "Back Up" (feat. Phanatik) | 4:14 |
| 20. | "Cypha’ 911" | 3:21 |
| Total length: | | 72:51 |
