= HIStory: Our Place in His Story =

HIStory: Our Place In His Story

Studio album by The Cross Movement
- Released: August 22, 2007
- Genre: Christian hip hop
- Label: Cross Movement Records

The Cross Movement chronology
Chronicles (Greatest Hits, Vol. 1) (2006)	HIStory: Our Place In His Story (2007)

Professional ratings
Review scores
Source	Rating
Rapzilla	link

HIStory: Our Place In His Story is the sixth and final original album from the Christian hip hop group the Cross Movement, released on August 22, 2007. It received a Grammy Award nomination for Best Rock Or Rap Gospel Album.

== Track listing ==
1. Our God
2. Louder
3. Trust In Him (feat. Robert “Don” Barham)
4. Spare Change
5. Tapestry
6. I Love You
7. 9-10
8. Back For This
9. Clap Your Hands
10. Name Up (feat. Tedashii)
11. Get That
12. Now Who’s the Man? (feat. Iz-Real)
13. Clarity (feat. Mac the Doulos)
14. Whatchu Say?
15. We Were They
16. Big Things
17. The Last Cypha (feat. Trip Lee, R-Swift, Mac the Doulos, Iz-Real, FLAME & Da’ T.R.U.T.H.)
