= Our World: Fallen =

Studio album by Flame
- Released: April 17, 2007
- Recorded: 2006–2007
- Genre: Christian hip hop
- Label: Cross Movement
- Producer: So Hot Productions, DJ Official, Tony Stone

Flame chronology
Rewind (2005)	Our World: Fallen (2007)	Our World: Redeemed (2008)

Professional ratings
Review scores
Source	Rating
Jesus Freak Hideout	4.5/5 stars
Rapzilla	4.5/5 stars

Our World: Fallen is the third studio album from American Christian rapper Flame, released on April 17, 2007.

== Music video ==
A music video was made for the song "Goodness to Repentance".

== Track listing ==
1. Our World Fallen
2. Where God Placed You
3. Shinin’ featuring Tedashii
4. MySpace featuring Diamone
5. Fallen World (interlude 1)
6. Goodness to Repentance
7. Call Him
8. When You Step featuring Da’ T.R.U.T.H.
9. World View
10. Fallen World (interlude 2)
11. Bad Ain't Good featuring Trubble
12. We Apologize
13. Desires in Conflict feat. Tony & UnderFive
14. Heart Stops
15. Come to Christ (interlude 3)
16. Goodbye featuring J.R. & J'son
