= The Ambassador (rapper) =

American rapper

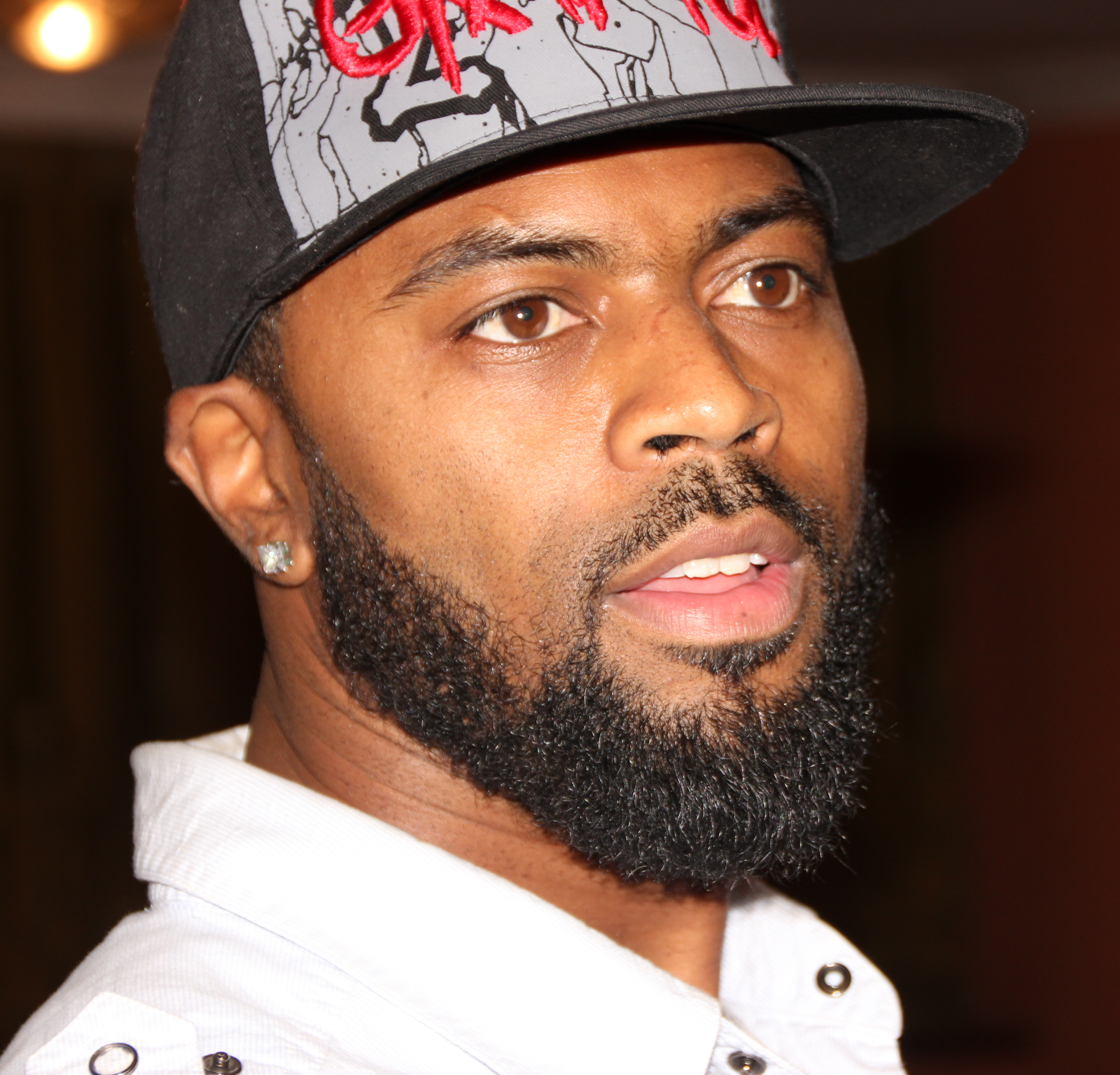
- The Ambassador in Nairobi, Kenya in September 2012

Background information
- Born: William Tyrone Branch
- Origin: Philadelphia, Pennsylvania, U.S.
- Genres: Christian hip-hop, hip-hop
- Years active: 1991-present
- Labels: Cross Movement, Xist
- Website: ambassador215.com

William Tyrone "Duce" Branch a.k.a. The Ambassador or Ambassador is a Christian hip-hop artist who has recorded both independently and as a founding member of the group The Cross Movement. Branch is the former president of Cross Movement Ministries. He is an alumnus of Dallas Theological Seminary and has a Master in Theology degree graduating with honors.

== Personal life ==
A graduate of Dallas Theological Seminary, William "Duce" Branch a.k.a. the Ambassador is the co-planter of Epiphany Fellowship in Philadelphia. He has toured globally as a solo artist and with the Cross Movement. He has also served as the president of the non-profit organization Cross Movement Ministries and ministered the gospel through rap and preaching for nearly 15 years.

Building on the success of his second solo project, The Thesis and his Grammy- and Stellar-nominated release HIStory with group the Cross Movement, he released The Chop Chop: From Milk to Meat, produced by J.R., Official, Tony Stone and HOTHANDZ. Its first single was "Gimme Dat!"

As of February 2020, he is the assistant professor of preaching and Bible and undergraduate chapel coordinator for The Judson College at Southeastern Baptist Theological Seminary.

== Discography ==
=== Studio albums ===
Year	Album
1999	Christology: In Laymen's Terms: Released: November 9, 1999
2005	The Thesis: Released: May 17, 2005
2008	The Chop Chop: From Milk to Meat: Released: September 23, 2008
2011	Stop the Funeral: Released: July 12, 2011
2016	When Sacred Meets Secular: Released: September 16, 2016
2022	The Invitation: Released: October 28, 2022

=== Guest appearances ===
- "Why Me" by Trip Lee
- "Everyday All Day Cypha" by Everyday Process featuring Lecrae, FLAME, Phanatik & R-Swift
- "Star Struck" by Da' T.R.U.T.H.
- "It's the S.O.I. (Sons of Intellect Anthem)" by KJ-52 featuring Phanatik credited on the packaging and liner notes as "Deuce"
- "I'm Alive Remix" by Jahaziel featuring G Kid & Da' T.R.U.T.H.
- "One, Two" cuts by DJ Skillspinz
- "Hold Your Ground" cuts by DJ Skillspinz

=== with the Cross Movement ===
- "Heaven's Mentality" (1997)
- "House of Representatives" (1998)
- "Human Emergency" (2000)
- "Holy Culture" (2003)
- "Gift Rap" (2004)
- "Higher Definition" (2004)
- "HIStory: Our Place In His Story" (2007)

== Music videos ==
- "The Ambassador - Honor and Glory (Official Music Video)" (1999)
- "Get You Open" (2005)
- "Gimme Dat!" (2008)
