= Our World: Redeemed =

Studio album by Flame
- Released: March 4, 2008
- Recorded: 2007
- Genre: Christian hip hop
- Label: Cross Movement
- Producer: So Hot Productions, DJ Official, Tony Stone, Chike "Beatz" Ojukwu, K-Drama

Flame chronology
Our World: Fallen (2007)	Our World: Redeemed (2008)	Captured (2010)

Professional ratings
Review scores
Source	Rating
Jesus Freak Hideout	5/5 stars
Rapzilla	4.5/5 stars

Our World: Redeemed is the fourth studio album from American Christian rapper Flame, released on March 4, 2008. The album jumped 41 chart positions in one week to hit the No. 1 position in its second week on the CMTA R&B/Hip Hop Chart. The project also debuted at No. 5 on the Billboard Top Gospel Chart. A video was made for the song Joyful Noise. The album has received a Grammy Award nomination for Best Rock or Rap Gospel Album.

== Track listing ==
Album release
No.	Title	Length
1.	"Flashback" (Intro)	1:18
2.	"Funeral to Birthday" (featuring Json, Kenny Petty)	4:39
3.	"Go Buck"	3:58
4.	"Who Can Pluck Us"	5:06
5.	"It's You" (featuring Robert "Don" Barham)	3:38
6.	"Confession" (Interlude)	1:01
7.	"Hold On"	4:47
8.	"I Been Redeemed" (featuring Trip Lee)	4:28
9.	"On That Cross"	3:49
10.	"See More Him" (Intro)	0:20
11.	"See More Him"	5:11
12.	"Power in Your Name" (featuring Dawn Dia)	3:56
13.	"Drama of Redemption" (Interlude)	1:41
14.	"It's All Gon' Pass" (featuring Future, Iz-Real)	4:35
15.	"2nd Coming" (featuring Shai Linne, Pastor Jeff White)	5:05
16.	"Joyful Noise" (featuring Lecrae, John Reilly)	5:25
Total length:		58:57
