= Heaven's Mentality =

Studio album by The Cross Movement
- Released: April 28, 1997
- Genre: Christian hip hop
- Label: Cross Movement Records

The Cross Movement chronology
Heaven's Mentality (1997)	House of Representatives (1998)

Professional ratings
Review scores
Source	Rating
Rapzilla	link

Heaven's Mentality is the debut album from the popular Christian hip hop group the Cross Movement, released on April 28, 1997. Although there are just four men on the cover the Cross Movement crew is listed in the insert as: The Ambassador, Cruz Cordero, Enock, Gift (Tonic + Earthquake), Phanatik, Prodigy and Tru-Life.

== Music video ==
A music video was made for the song "Cypha Time".

== Track listing ==
1. Blood Spilla’
2. Test It
3. Father Forgive Them
4. Who’s Da Man
5. Catch 22
6. Heaven’s Mentality
7. Dust
8. Shock!
9. Lower Case gods
10. El Elyon
11. Solo Christo
12. Cypha’ Time
13. The Love Letter (Bonus Track)
