= The Faith (album) =

Studio album by Da' T.R.U.T.H.
- Released: September 13, 2005
- Recorded: 2005
- Genre: Christian hip hop
- Label: Cross Movement Records
- Producer: Saint Man; David Hackley; Double Dragon; Lee Jerkins; J.R. Kevin Arthur; Official; Da’ T.R.U.T.H. David Lee Arrington; Nab; Irvin Washington

Da' T.R.U.T.H. chronology
Moment Of Truth (2004)	The Faith (2005)	Open Book (2007)

The Faith is the second solo album from Christian hip hop artist Da’ T.R.U.T.H., released on September 13, 2005.

== Reception ==
Professional ratings
Review scores
Source	Rating
Rapzilla	4/5 stars

== Track listing ==
S No.	Title	Producer(s)	Time
1.	Welcome to the Faith	Saint Man	1:50
2.	Our World	Lee Jerkins; David Hackley	5:09
3.	Classroom (Interlude)		0:25
4.	Incredible Christian	Double Dragon	3:11
5.	On Duty	J.R.	4:18
6.	Legacy	Kevin Arthur	4:29
7.	Go	Official; Da' T.R.U.T.H.	4:24
8.	Turn You Around (feat. Shabach)	David Lee Arrington	3:32
9.	Civilian	Nab	4:32
10.	Stand Chant		0:12
11.	Stand (feat. Lecrae & FLAME)	Official	5:03
12.	2 is Better (feat. J.R.)	Double Dragon	4:31
13.	Conversations (Interlude)	David Lee Arrington	1:40
14.	Conversations (feat. Keran & La Tia)	Official	4:05
15.	Teacher?	Lee Jerkins; David Hackley	4:20
16.	The Portrait	Kevin Arthur	2:49
17.	Whose Team?	Irvin Washington	5:12
18.	They (Hidden Track)		
