= Reilly (band) =

American Christian rock band

Reilly is an indie Christian alternative folk rock band based in Philadelphia. The band, originally called The John Reilly Band, was formed during the core members' college days by vocalist John Reilly, violinists Dan Huie and former member of the now defunct band On Loan, Noele Huie (née Parris), bassist Matthew Bomberger and drummer Kyle Thoman (Jordan Lenhoff jumped on board next & then Marcus Myers). They have recorded and released three albums: While I Was on Earth (2005), Let June Decide (2007), Around the World (2010), and A Fall City Christmas (Original Motion Picture Sound Track) (2021). The band has played several large festivals, such as Cornerstone, Creation, and Purple Door, and performed with well-known artists such as Switchfoot, Jars of Clay, and BarlowGirl. Frontman John Reilly was nominated for a 2009 GMA Dove Award for his collaboration “Joyful Noise” with Flame and Lecrae on Our World: Redeemed, and the band's song "Sunlight" was awarded "Best Music Video" at the 2009 San Diego Film Festival.
