= House of Representatives (album) =

Studio album by The Cross Movement
- Released: February 18, 1999
- Genre: Christian hip hop
- Label: Cross Movement Records

The Cross Movement chronology
Heaven's Mentality (1997)	House of Representatives (1999)	Human Emergency (2000)

Professional ratings
Review scores
Source	Rating
Rapzilla	link

House of Representatives is the second album from the popular Christian hip hop group the Cross Movement, released on February 18, 1999. The Cross Movement on this album consisted of The Ambassador, Cruz Cordero, EarthQuake, Enock, Phanatik, Tru-Life and Tonic.

== Music video ==
A music video was made for the song "House of Representatives".

== Track listing ==
1. Welcome
2. House of Representatives
3. Introducin’
4. It or a Thing (Interlude)
5. Playa Hater #1
6. Human Superstars
7. Eyes Off Me
8. I Am That I Am
9. Spare Rituals
10. Off the Hook
11. Not On Stage (Interlude)
12. Just 4 You
13. Maze of the Madness
14. Know Your God (Interlude)
15. The Way
16. Rescue
17. Think On These Things
18. Cypha the Next Day
19. Word Up
