= Rewind (Flame album) =

Studio album by Flame
- Released: December 6, 2005
- Recorded: 2005
- Genre: Christian hip hop
- Label: Cross Movement Records
- Producers: DJ Official; Lecrae; J.R. Million Tracks; Vice Versatile; D. SpearZ; Flame; DJ Essence; CI; N.A.B. Mac

Flame chronology
Flame (2004)	Rewind (2005)	Our World: Fallen (2007)

Professional ratings
Review scores
Source	Rating
Rapzilla	4/5 stars

Rewind is the second studio album from Christian hip hop artist Flame, released on December 6, 2005.

== Track listing ==
#	Title	Producer(s)	Time
1.	"Show Intro"	DJ Official	1:33
2.	"No Silence" (feat. Lecrae)	Lecrae	4:07
3.	"Uh-Oh"	J.R.	4:14
4.	"So Sweet" (feat. Dawn Dia)	Million Tracks	3:58
5.	"Rewind"	DJ Official	3:42
6.	"Gotta Notice"	Vice Versatile; D. SpearZ	3:40
7.	"We Need You"	J.R.	4:04
8.	"Commercial"	DJ Official; Million Tracks; Vice Versatile; Flame	1:32
9.	"Context"	J.R.	3:42
10.	"War Of The Minds" (feat. J.R.)	J.R.	5:01
11.	"Give Us The Truth Pt. 2"	J.R.	4:34
12.	"The Godhead" (feat. Pastor Joe)	DJ Essence	4:16
13.	"Let's Go (feat. Json & Trubble)"	J.R.	3:13
14.	"Racial Diversity" (feat. Elinor & J.R.)	CI	3:50
15.	"To My Heart" (feat. shai linne)	J.R.	4:10
16.	"Break Bread"	N.A.B.	3:41
17.	"Welcome"	Mac	2:45
18.	"Sola Scriptura"	J.R.	2:35
19.	"Cross Movement"	DJ Official	3:42
20.	"Show Outro"	N.A.B.	2:06
21.	"We Preach Christ"	Mac	3:33
