= The Big Picture (Da' T.R.U.T.H. album) =

Studio album by Da' T.R.U.T.H.
- Released: July 21, 2009
- Genre: Christian Hip hop, Urban contemporary gospel
- Label: Cross Movement Records
- Producer: So Hot Productions, G.P., Lee Jerkins, Kevin Arthur, DJ Official, Swoope

Da' T.R.U.T.H. chronology
| Open Book (2007) | The Big Picture (2009) | The Whole Truth (2011) |

Professional ratings
Review scores
| Source | Rating |
|---|---|
| Allmusic | 4/5 stars |

The Big Picture is the fourth studio album from Christian hip-hop artist Da' T.R.U.T.H. It was released on July 21, 2009 through Cross Movement Records.

== Track listing ==
1. "U Ready?" - 3:43
2. "The Big Picture Interlude" (Washington, Lambert) - 1:57
3. "Legend" - 3:48
4. "Tree to Tree" - 3:34
5. "Intermission" - 3:54
6. "Lost" - 4:45
7. "Trumpet Blow" - 4:16
8. "You Made" - 4:23
9. "Applying the Big Picture" (Washington, Lambert) - 1:18
10. "My President" - 4:21
11. "Great Wall" - 5:12
12. "Fantasy" (Lambert, Pebbles) - 3:46
13. "Talk to You" (Abramsamadu, Lambert) - 4:29
14. "That Great Day [Remix]" (Lambert, Peebles, Tribbett) - 3:01
15. "How Long" (Lambertt, Pittman) - 4:46
16. "Pain" - 4:24
17. "Suitcase" (Bell, Elliott, Lambert, Swoope) 5:31

== Awards ==
The album was nominated for a Dove Award for Rap/Hip-Hop Album of the Year at the 41st GMA Dove Awards. The song "Lost" was also nominated for Rap/Hip-Hop Recorded Song of the Year. The Big Picture was also nominated for a Grammy Award for Best Rock or Rap Gospel Album at the 52nd Grammy Awards.

== Chart performance ==
The album peaked at No. 110 on the Billboard 200, No. 4 on the Billboard Christian Albums chart, and No. 2 on the Gospel Albums chart. It spent 52 weeks on the latter chart.
