= Complicated =

Complicated may refer to:

== Music ==
=== Albums ===
- Complicated (Nivea album), or the title song
- Complicated (Tanya Tucker album), or the title song
- Complicated (Parmalee EP), or the title song
- Complicated (EP), by Josh Ross, or the title song

=== Songs ===
- "Complicated" (Avril Lavigne song)
- "Complicated" (Carolyn Dawn Johnson song)
- "Complicated" (Dimitri Vegas & Like Mike and David Guetta song)
- "Complicated" (Jason Derulo and Inna song)
- "Complicated" (Rihanna song)
- "Complicated" (The Cliks song)
- "A Complicated Song" is the seventh (7th) song on the "Poodle Hat" album by Weird Al
- "Complicated", by Bon Jovi on their album Have a Nice Day, 2005
- "Complicated", by Fitz and the Tantrums on their self-titled album, 2016
- "Complicated", by KSI on his album Dissimulation, 2020
- "Complicated", by Mac Miller on his album Circles, 2020
- "Complicated", by The Rolling Stones on their album Between the Buttons, 1967
- “Complicated” by Miss Li, 2020

== See also ==
- Complication (disambiguation)
- It's Complicated (disambiguation)
