= Heartbeat (Da' T.R.U.T.H. album) =

Studio album by Da' T.R.U.T.H.
- Released: April 15, 2014
- Genre: Christian hip hop, urban contemporary gospel
- Length: 72:46
- Label: Mixed Bag
- Producer: Black Knight, DJ Corbett, Justin Ebach, Jordin Endow, Epikh Pro, J.R., Joseph Love, Alex Medina, Carlin Muccular, S1

Da' T.R.U.T.H. chronology
Love Hope War (2013)	Heartbeat (2014)	It's Complicated (2016)

Heartbeat is the seventh studio album by Christian hip hop recording artist Da' T.R.U.T.H., released on April 15, 2014 by Da' T.R.U.T.H.'s own label, Mixed Bag Records. It features artists such as Braille, Capital Kings, Chris August, Lecrae, Papa San, and Tedashii, and production by Black Knight, DJ Corbett, Justin Ebach, Jordin Endow, Epikh Pro, J.R., Joseph Love, Alex Medina, Carlin Muccular and S1.

== Style ==
Da' T.R.U.T.H. experimented with a wide variety of musical styles on Heartbeat. Branden Murphy noted that the tracks "Loud and Clear" and "Compare" feature a very "pop-ish" sound, "Press" contains a "dash of reggae," "Promises" features a Contemporary Christian music style, and "Mixed Bag" has a boom bap sound. Dwayne Lacey listed off rap, electro, Gospel, CCM, and pop as among the styles featured on the album.

== Critical reception ==
Professional ratings
Review scores
Source	Rating
AllMusic	3.5/5 stars
CCM Magazine	4/5 stars
New Release Tuesday	3.5/5 stars

Heartbeat met with generally positive reception from music critics. The four star review by CCM Magazine's Andrew Greer was given for the music coming "With a burden for bearing life-changing spiritual truths through his rhyming prowess over thick jams, the gospel hip-hop forerunner enrolls a list of Grammy-winning producers to distribute an LP that is musically both experimental and highly accessible." David Jeffries of AllMusic rated the album three-and-a-half stars out of five, stating that "it's the usual T.R.U.T.H. boldness and brilliance all over again, along with the return of the overabundance issue, although even at 16 tracks, this one only seems overstuffed by about one or two". At New Release Tuesday, Dwayne Lacy rated the album three-and-a-half stars, writing that "this album has so much to offer". Branden Murphy of Wade-O Radio stated that while the album allowed Da' T.R.U.T.H.'s creativity and freedom that comes with recording under his own, newly established label, the wide variety of styles on the album can come across as "scattered" on first listen.

== Commercial performance ==
For the Billboard charting week of May 3, 2014, Heartbeat debuted at No. 84 on the Billboard 200, No. 7 and No. 2 on the Christian Albums and Top Gospel Albums charts, respectively, No. 8 on the Rap Albums chart, and No. 16 on the Independent Albums chart.

== Track listing ==
Heartbeat
No.	Title	Writer(s)	Producer(s)	Length
1.	"Gray" (featuring J.R.)	Emanuel Lambert, Courtney "J.R." Peebles	J.R.	4:28
2.	"Press" (featuring Canon, Papa San)	Lambert, J.R.	J.R.	4:32
3.	"Loud & Clear" (featuring Capital Kings, Tedashii)	Lambert, J.R.	J.R.	4:24
4.	"I Made It" (featuring Black Knight, TC)	Lambert	Black Knight	4:46
5.	"Promises" (featuring Isaac Carree)	Lambert, Carlin Muccular, J. Williams	Carlin Muccular	3:51
6.	"Come Home" (featuring ZG)	Lambert, Zack Gaddis, Alex Medina	Alex Medina	3:18
7.	"Waiting (Interlude)" (featuring Joseph Lindsay)		Joseph Lindsay	1:16
8.	"Welcome Home" (featuring James Fortune)	Lambert, DJ Corbett	DJ Corbett	5:07
9.	"Standing O" (featuring TJ Pompeo)	Lambert, TJ Pompeo	S1 and Epikh Pro	5:42
10.	"Mixed Bag"	Lambert, J.R.	Joseph Love	2:35
11.	"Compare" (featuring Alexis Spight)	Lambert, J.R.	J.R.	6:09
12.	"Bully" (featuring J.R.)	Lambert, J.R.	Joseph Love and J.R.	4:56
13.	"Change the World" (featuring Chris August)	Lambert, J. Williams, Mushran Johnson, Mark Mims, Maurice Tonia	Justin Ebach and Jordin Endow	4:39
14.	"Heartbeat" (featuring Lecrae, Lauren Lee)	Lambert, J.R.	J.R.	6:42
15.	"Rising Sun" (featuring TJ Pompeo, Prayz1, ZG)	Lambert, Gaddis, Medina, TJ Pompeo	Alex Medina	4:23
16.	"Hope (Remix)" (featuring Braille, Derek Minor, and Promise)	Lambert, Medina	Alex Medina	5:58
Total length:				72:46

== Charts ==
Chart (2014)	Peak position
US Billboard 200	84
US Christian Albums (Billboard)	7
US Top Gospel Albums (Billboard)	2
US Independent Albums (Billboard)	16
US Top Rap Albums (Billboard)	8
