= Water stagnation =

Water that does not flow

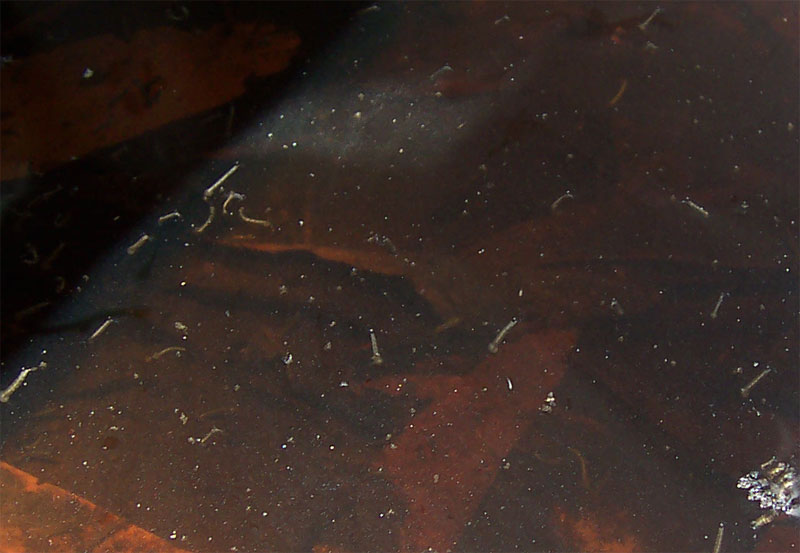
Mosquito larvae in stagnant water

Water stagnation (commonly referred to as stillwater), occurs when water stops flowing for a long period of time. Stagnant water can be a significant environmental hazard.

== Medical complications ==
Stagnated water is a serious health risk and causes detrimental internal damage to the human body if not treated in time. In some cases, a treatment is not possible.

Many forms of bacteria, fungi and microorganisms, including a variety of harmful pathogens thrive and grow in stagnated water. The most common are:

- E. Coli
- Salmonella
- Giardia lamblia
- Cryptosporidium
- Leptospira
- Malaria
- Dengue
- Naegleria fowleri (also known as brain-eating-Amoeba)

The medical complications of ingesting or coming in contact with stagnated water can differ depending on the severity of the incident, contributing factors such as how long the water was stagnant for, how much was ingested, and how long the patient has been undiagnosed are all factors that could alter the symptoms and outcomes, however, a variety of symptoms and complications could occur, such as:

Complications that take effect almost immediately (or within an hour):

- Blistering of skin
- Rashes
- Itchiness
- Sore eyes

Complications that may take effect after a couple of hours:

- High fever
- Severe stomach cramps
- Leptospirosis
- Diarrhoea
- Nausea
- Vomiting
- Discoloured urine
- Organ damage
- Brain damage

Note that if the stagnated water in question contained traces of Naegleria fowleri, which is known to cause primary amoebic meningoencephalitis, coming in contact with the stagnated water can be fatal.

Treatment may differ, though the most common treatments would often include the use of aggressive anti-fungal, and anti-microbial therapy/drugs. Early diagnosis is critical, though treatment is challenging and often unsuccessful, as it heavily relies on the severity and level of contamination the stagnated water is in.

If someone comes into contact with stagnated water, it is recommended to safely take a sample of the water, or take a photo of the body of water, as this can help health professionals analyze the bacteria and contaminants in the water. The person who made contact with stagnated water should get immediate medical attention.

== Dangers ==
Malaria and dengue are among the main dangers of stagnant water, which can become a breeding ground for the mosquitoes that transmit these diseases.

Stagnant water can be dangerous because it provides a better incubator than running water for many kinds of infectious pathogens. Stagnant water can be contaminated with feces, particularly in deserts or other areas of low rainfall. Water stagnation for as little as six days can completely change bacterial community composition and increase cell count.

Stagnant water may be classified into the following basic, although overlapping, types:

- Water body stagnation (stagnation in swamp, lake, lagoon, river, etc.)
- Surface and ground water stagnation
- Trapped water stagnation. The water may be trapped in human artifacts (discarded cans, plant pots, tires, dug-outs, roofs, etc.), as well as in natural containers, such as hollow tree trunks, leaf sheaths, etc.

To avoid ground and surface water stagnation, the drainage of surface and subsoil is advised. Areas with a shallow water table are more susceptible to ground water stagnation due to the lower availability of natural soil drainage.

== Life that may thrive in stagnant water ==
Some plants prefer flowing water, while others, such as lotuses, prefer stagnant water.

Various anaerobic bacteria are commonly found in stagnant water. For this reason, pools of stagnant water have historically been used in processing hemp and some other fiber crops, as well as linden bark used for making bast shoes. Several weeks of soaking makes bast fibers easily separable due to bacterial and fermentative processes known as retting.

- Denitrifying bacteria
- Leptospira
- Purple bacteria (both sulfur and non-sulfur)
- Brain-eating amoeba

=== Fish ===
- Asian swamp eel
- Lepisosteidae (commonly known as the gar)
- Northern snakehead
- Pygmy gourami
- Spotted barb
- Walking catfish

=== Insects ===
Stagnant water is the favorite breeding ground for a number of insects.

- Dragonfly nymphs
- Fly maggots
- Mosquito larvae
- Nepidae (water scorpions)

=== Other ===
- Algae
- Biofilm
- A number of species of frogs prefer stagnant water.
- Some species of turtles, such as the mata mata.

== See also ==
- Anoxic waters
- Eutrophication (excessive enrichment by nutrients and minerals)
- Slough (hydrology)
- Wetland
- Residence time distribution
- Water pollution
