= It's Complicated =

It's Complicated can refer to:

== Television ==
- It's Complicated (film), a 2009 romantic comedy film
- Denise Richards: It's Complicated, a reality TV show

== Music ==
- It's Complicated (album), a 2016 album by Da' T.R.U.T.H.
- It's Complicated (EP), a 2024 EP by Yesung
- "It's Complicated" (A Day to Remember song), 2011
- "It's Complicated" (Maraaya song), 2017

== See also ==
- Complicated (disambiguation)
