= Love Hope War =

Studio album by Da' T.R.U.T.H.
- Released: January 29, 2013
- Genre: Christian hip hop, urban contemporary gospel
- Length: 53:46
- Label: Xist

Da' T.R.U.T.H. chronology
The Whole Truth (2011)	Love Hope War (2013)	Heartbeat (2014)

Love Hope War is the sixth studio album from Christian hip hop recording artist Da' T.R.U.T.H. It was released on January 29, 2013 by Xist Music. The album charted at No. 88 on the Billboard 200.

== Background ==
On January 29, 2013, the sixth studio album from Christian hip hop musician Da' T.R.U.T.H. released with Xist Music and is entitled Love Hope War.

== Critical reception ==
Professional ratings
Review scores
Source	Rating
CCM Magazine	3/5 stars
The Christian Manifesto	4/5 stars
Christian Music Zine	4.75/5
New Release Tuesday	3.5/5 stars

Love Hope War garnered positive reception from the ratings and reviews of four music critics. Grace S. Aspinwall of CCM Magazine rated the album three stars, calling this a "solid record". At New Release Tuesday, Dwayne Lacy rated the album three-and-a-half stars, stating that on a release that "is convicting, but not condemning" the material is "introspective, but yet serves as an encouragement and an admonishment for believers", yet "The trap beats were a little excessive, but the album is wonderfully written." The Christian Manifesto's Calvin Moore rated the album four stars, remarking how "Love, Hope, War showcases an artist in rare form and places him, I believe, squarely in the top 10 Christian rappers at the moment." At Christian Music Zine, Anthony Peronto rated the album 4.75 out of five, writing how the artist "is back and better than ever" on a release where "The lyricism was on point, the concept of the album was consistent and fully realized, and the production has vastly improved from his previous projects."

== Commercial performance ==
For the Billboard charting week of February 16, 2013, Love Hope War was the No. 88 most sold album in the entirety of the United States, and it was the Nos. 5 and 2 most sold albums on the Christian Albums and Top Gospel Albums charts respectively. In addition, it was the No. 10 most sold on the Rap Albums chart that same week, along with being, the No. 11 most sold on the Independent Albums chart.

== Track listing ==
Tracklist
No.	Title	Length
1.	"D.O.S."	4:01
2.	"Hunger Games"	3:26
3.	"Where Was I"	4:59
4.	"The City" (featuring B. Reith)	4:32
5.	"J.I.F.E."	4:39
6.	"Real Love"	4:09
7.	"Ugly Love"	4:56
8.	"Hope" (featuring Thi'sl, Flame & Trip Lee)	4:54
9.	"The G.O.a.T."	4:08
10.	"Peace Talks" (featuring Swoope)	5:21
11.	"Table Talk"	4:08
12.	"What About" (featuring Christon Gray)	4:33
Total length:		53:46

== Chart performance ==
Chart (2014)	Peak position
US Billboard 200	88
US Christian Albums (Billboard)	5
US Top Gospel Albums (Billboard)	2
US Independent Albums (Billboard)	11
US Top Rap Albums (Billboard)	10
