= After the Music Stops =

Studio album by Lecrae
- Released: September 24, 2006
- Genres: Christian hip hop; Southern hip hop
- Length: 69:18
- Labels: Cross Movement; Reach
- Producers: Lecrae; So Hot Productions; Mac the Doulos; DJ Official; Tony Stone

Lecrae chronology
Real Talk (2004)	After the Music Stops (2006)	Rebel (2008)

Professional ratings
Review scores
Source	Rating
Cross Rhythms	10/10 stars
Jesus Freak Hideout	3.5/5 stars
Rapzilla	4.5/5 stars
TheFish	Favorable

After the Music Stops is the second studio album released by Christian rap artist Lecrae on September 24, 2006. The album received a Stellar Award nomination for "Rap/Hip-Hop/Gospel CD of the Year" and a Dove Award nomination for Rap/Hip-Hop Album of the Year.

In the July–August 2010 issue of MH Magazine, After the Music Stops was second on the list of "Top Christian Hip Hop Albums of All Time".

== Track listing ==
No.	Title	Length
1.	"After the Music Stops"	4:06
2.	"Jesus Muzik" (featuring Trip Lee)	4:46
3.	"I Did It For You" (featuring Diamone)	4:53
4.	"The Truth"	4:19
5.	"Run"	3:52
6.	"Send Me"	4:56
7.	"It's Your World" (featuring Redeemed Thought and Sho Baraka)	4:10
8.	"Grateful" (featuring J.R.)	3:30
9.	"King Intro"	0:54
10.	"The King" (featuring FLAME)	3:34
11.	"Invisible" (featuring Diamone)	4:17
12.	"Get Low"	2:50
13.	"Prayin For You"	3:29
14.	"Nobody" (featuring Cam)	4:32
15.	"Death Story"	3:49
16.	"Unashamed" (featuring Tedashii)	3:34
17.	"El Shaddai" (performed by Cam)	4:26
18.	"Jump" (bonus track)	3:21

== Awards ==
In 2007, the album was nominated for a Dove Award for Rap/Hip-Hop Album of the Year at the 38th GMA Dove Awards.
