= Apply Pressure =

Studio album by R-Swift
- Released: June 25, 2013
- Genre: Christian hip hop
- Length: 52:06
- Label: Central South, Rhyme Council

R-Swift chronology
Anthem (2009)	Apply Pressure (2013)

Apply Pressure is the fifth album from R-Swift. Rhyme Council Music Group alongside Central South Records released the project on June 25, 2013.

== Reception ==
Professional ratings
Review scores
Source	Rating
Cross Rhythms	9/10 squares
Jesus Freak Hideout	4.5/5 stars
New Release Tuesday	4.5/5 stars

Signaling in a four and a half star review by Jesus Freak Hideout, Kevin Hoskins responds, "The beats are hot, the rapping is tight, and the focus is Godly, making Apply Pressure a chance to be in the 'best rap album of the year' category." Mark Ryan, specifying for New Release Tuesday in a four and a half star review, recognizes, "The beats are superb, lyrical content may truly be life changing for some listeners and the heart of the artist is laid bare for all to see." Indicating in a nine out of ten review by Cross Rhythms, Steve Hayes replies, "If some albums are for the underground, 'Apply Pressure' has great commercial appeal and has the potential to reach where few Christian albums can."

== Track listing ==
No.	Title	Music	Length
1.	"Apply Pressure" (featuring Tjay)		3:20
2.	"For You"		3:43
3.	"Raindrops" (featuring Social Club)		4:54
4.	"Problem"		3:47
5.	"Dear Mr. President pt. 2"		3:51
6.	"Don't Go" (featuring Alena Trimiar)		4:17
7.	"Love Story" (featuring Butta P and J.R.)		3:43
8.	"Interlude"		0:37
9.	"April 19th" (featuring Carmen Rodgers)		4:18
10.	"Lookin' for Trouble" (featuring Sho Baraka and Eddie Nigma)	audio game	2:59
11.	"R.C.M.G." (featuring Fro W.U.N.D.A.S., Relz and Big Fil)	audio game	3:59
Total length:			39:28

== Charts ==
Chart (2013)	Peak position
US Christian Albums (Billboard)	46
US Top Gospel Albums (Billboard)	21
