= 6 Way St. =

American Christian music group

- Also known as: Level 3:16, 6 Way St.
- Origin: Indianapolis, Indiana
- Genres: Christian hip hop, Christian R&B, contemporary R&B, urban contemporary gospel
- Years active: 2009–present
- Label: Cross Movement
- Members: STV G Chris; Kristin (K Mase); Candace; Crystal; K.B.
- Website: the6way.com

6 Way St. (originally named Level 3:16) is an American Christian R&B and Christian hip-hop group signed to the Cross Movement Records. They are based out of Indianapolis, Indiana. The group consists of two male M.C.'s, three female vocalists and one female DJ.

In 2011, the group reached the Billboard charts with their debut album under the original band name Level 3:16.

== Background ==
The Christian hip hop and Christian R&B group, 6 Way St. started out as 'Level 3:16'. The two male M.C's are Steve "STV G" Gaskin and Chris Tabron. The three female vocalists are Kristin "K Mase" Mason, Candace Jones, and Crystal Whitaker. The female DJ is Kristen "K.B." Betts. They are based out of Indianapolis, Indiana.

== History ==
In 2009, the six members met while on a summer trip near Indianapolis, IN. The group was part of The Impact Movement at Keynote. This was a program dedicated to training Christian musicians to establish programs, schedule tours and create outreach seminars across the United States.

== Debut Album (2010) ==
The band launched their debut album, Level 3:16, on December 28, 2010, under the name 'Level 3:16'. The album charted on two Billboard charts. Rapzilla reviewed the album giving it a three and a half out of five rating, and Cross Rhythms rated the album a ten out of ten.

== Name change and TGFKAL (2014) ==
In June 2014, the group officially rebranded and changed their name from Level 3:16 to 6 Way St. To introduce their new brand and musical identity, the group released a free six-track extended play (EP) titled TGFKAL (an acronym for "The Group Formerly Known As Level 3:16") on June 25, 2014. The project was premiered as a digital download through the Christian hip-hop platform Rapzilla and featured a collaborative appearance by R&B artist Mali Music on the track "Fresh Wind".

== Members ==
- Steve "STV G" Gaskin - M.C.
- Chris Tabron - M.C.
- Kristin Mason (K Mase) - vocalist
- Candace Jones - vocalist
- Crystal Whitaker - vocalist
- Kristen "K.B." Betts - DJ

== Discography ==
=== Studio albums ===
==== As Level 3:16 ====
List of studio albums, with selected chart positions
Title	Album details	Peak chart positions	
Title	Album details	US Chr	US Gos
Level 3:16	Released: December 28, 2010; Label: Cross Movement; CD, digital download	27	8

=== Extended plays ===
==== As 6 Way St. ====
Title	Album details
TGFKAL	Released: June 25, 2014; Label: Cross Movement; Formats: Digital download, streaming
