= Real Talk (Lecrae album) =

Studio album by Lecrae
- Released: May 20, 2004
- Genres: Christian hip hop; gangsta rap; hardcore hip hop
- Labels: Cross Movement; Reach

Lecrae chronology
Real Talk (2004)	After the Music Stops (2006)

Professional ratings
Review scores
Source	Rating
Cross Rhythms	8/10 stars
Jesus Freak Hideout	4/5 stars
The Phantom Tollbooth	4.5/5 stars

Real Talk is the debut studio album by Christian hip hop recording artist Lecrae. There were two different versions of this album; a version released by Reach Records in 2004 and a Cross Movement Records version, released in 2005. The 2005 version of the album reached No. 29 on the Billboard Gospel Albums chart, and was on the chart for 12 weeks.

== Track listing ==
No.	Title	Length
1.	"Souled Out" (featuring J.A.B.)	4:44
2.	"We Don't" (featuring R-Swift)	4:10
3.	"Aliens" (featuring Tedashii)	3:59
4.	"Crossover"	3:53
5.	"Represent" (featuring Tedashii)	3:28
6.	"Real Talk Interlude"	0:41
7.	"Take Me As I Am"	4:49
8.	"Tha Church" (featuring Sho Baraka)	5:04
9.	"Nothin'"	4:17
10.	"The Line" (featuring Tedashii)	4:00
11.	"Who You Wit"	3:56
12.	"Heaven or Hell"	3:36
13.	"Wait Intro"	0:50
14.	"Wait" (featuring Steven Carter)	3:36
Total length:		55:39

Bonus tracks
No.	Title	Length
15.	"You're Faithful (To Me)"
16.	"Represent (Chopped and Screwed)"
