= K-Drama (rapper) =

American rapper

- Born: Anthony Regis Jones; August 28, 1984 (age 41); Cincinnati, Ohio
- Genres: Christian hip hop, urban contemporary gospel
- Occupations: Rapper, singer, songwriter
- Instruments: Vocals, singer-songwriter
- Years active: 2001–present
- Labels: Cross Movement, Holy Hip Hop
- Website: k-dramamusic.com

Anthony Regis Jones (born August 28, 1984), who goes by the stage name K-Drama, is an American Christian rapper. His first studio album, Behind the Glory, came out in 2006. His Billboard chart debut album, We Fit: The Workout Plan, came out in 2010. His album Winds & .Waves was self-released in 2013 and charted on a Billboard chart.

== Early life ==
K-Drama was born on August 28, 1984, as Anthony Regis Jones, in Cincinnati, Ohio, where he still continues to reside. His father is Anthony Kent Jones and mother is Darlene Carol Jones (née, Beatty). He has an older half-brother on his maternal side, Aaron Lee Beatty. He has another older half-sister on his paternal side, Kenga Jones.

== Personal life ==
He is married to Charde Jones, and they have three children, residing in Cincinnati, Ohio.

== Music career ==
His music career started in 2006, with the release of Behind the Glory, with Holy Hip Hop Records. The next major studio release from him, We Fit: The Workout Plan, was released by Cross Movement Records in 2010, and it charted on several Billboard charts. His next project, was a self-released album, Winds & Waves, which came out in 2013. This got on one Billboard chart.

== Discography ==
=== Studio albums and mixtapes ===
List of studio albums and mixtapes with selected chart positions
Title	Album details	Peak chart positions		
Title	Album details	US Chr	US Gos	US Heat
Threat 2 Society	Released: 2001			
Next N' Line (TCR Compilation)	Released: 2002			
Non-fiction : Beneath the surface	Released: 2003			
Certified Street Bangers – Underground of Underground	T.H.I.S. Click Records (2004)			
Serious Series Volume 1: The Streetz Iz Watchin'	T.H.I.S. Click Records (2004)			
Serious Series Volume 2: Audio Narcotics	T.H.I.S. Click Records (2004)			
Serious Series Volume 3: Block Appeal	T.H.I.S. Click Records (2005)			
14 2 Life: Illustrations of Self	Released: January 15, 2005			
Black Guy Meets White Man	MC Till & K-Drama (2006)			
Road to Glory Mixtape	Released: August 20, 2007			
Ceasefire Cincinnati: The EP	Released: May 5, 2007			
Behind the Glory	Released: September 12, 2006			
Crunk Christmas Carols EP	Released: December 18, 2007			
BoomBaptism	Released: December 9, 2008			
We Fit: The Workout Plan	Released: August 10, 2010 Label: Cross Movement	41	13	42
For the Longest Time Mixtape	Released March 16, 2010			
Winds & .Waves	Released: September 24, 2013 Label: K-Drama		35	
Christmas Rap Music EP	Released December 19, 2014			
Wish it was Sooner Mixtape	Released: May 12, 2014			
The 8th	Released: February 19, 2016			
Whetherman	Released: July 27, 2018 Label: Playwright Music			
