= Jesus Muzik =

2006 single by Lecrae featuring Trip Lee

Single by Lecrae featuring Trip Lee

from the album After the Music Stops
- Recorded: 2006
- Genre: Christian hip hop
- Label: Cross Movement Records; Reach
- Songwriter(s): Lecrae; Trip Lee; Courtney Peebles

Lecrae featuring Trip Lee singles chronology
"Prayin' For You"	"Jesus Muzik"	"Hands High"

Music video
- Video on YouTube

"Jesus Muzik" is the second single from Lecrae's second studio album, After the Music Stops. It is critically acclaimed and was nominated for two GMA Dove Awards. The song also features fellow Christian hip hop artist Trip Lee. The lyrics discuss the problems with the content of secular hip hop, and the importance for Christians of listening to Christian music to glorify God.

== Awards ==
In 2007, the song was nominated for a Dove Award for Rap/Hip-Hop Recorded Song of the Year at the 38th GMA Dove Awards.
