= Young Joshua =

American rapper

Young Joshua is an American Christian hip hop recording artist from Philadelphia, Pennsylvania. Joshua is signed to the Christian hip hop label Cross Movement Records and has released one studio album entitled Thinking Out Loud which reached 23 on the Gospel Billboard Charts in 2010.

== Conversion ==
Young Joshua began writing rap lyrics at the age of 11. However his skills did not improve until he reached the age of 17 years old. He contributed this change in his rap style due to the fact that he changed his spiritual view. He then refocus his craft of music and aim it at Christians and non-Christians who had not yet experience the word on God.

== Music career ==
Young Joshua started his career as an independent artist, but in 2010 he signed with Cross Movement Records. To date, Young Joshua has been featured on 50 different Christian albums and has released one studio album.

== Discography ==
=== Studio albums ===
List of studio albums, with selected chart positions
Title	Album details	Peak chart positions
Title	Album details	US Gos
Thinking Out Loud	Released: September 7, 2010; Label: Cross Movement; CD, digital download	23
