= Everyday Process =

American hip hop group

- Origin: Chester, Pennsylvania
- Genres: Christian hip hop, Urban contemporary gospel
- Years active: 1997–2011
- Label: Cross Movement
- Members: Iz-Real; Mac the Doulos

Everyday Process is a Christian hip hop duo from Chester, Pennsylvania. The members are Iz-Real and Mac the Doulos. In 2007, Cross Movement Records released the duo's first album Everyday Process: The Process of Illumination & Elimination. This charted on two Billboard charts. The second and last album from the duo in 2009 was Outtadisworld, with Cross Movement Records.

== Early life ==
Everyday Process are two Christian hip hop artists, who come together to create a duo, from Chester, Pennsylvania. They are Iz-Real and Mac the Doulos.

== Music career ==
Everyday Process started making music in 2007. They became signed to Cross Movement Records before their 2007 release, Everyday Process: The Process of Illumination & Elimination, This album charted on two Billboard charts. Their next, 2009's Outtadisworld, with the same record label, just charted on one Billboard chart.

== Discography ==
=== Studio albums ===
List of studio albums, with selected chart positions
Title	Album details	Peak chart positions	
Title	Album details	US Chr	US Gos
Everyday Process: The Process of Illumination & Elimination	Released: March 20, 2007; Label: Cross Movement; CD, digital download	49	18
Outtadisworld	Released: September 1, 2009; Label: Cross Movement; CD, digital download	–	23
