= Higher Definition =

Studio album by The Cross Movement
- Released: October 26, 2004
- Genre: Christian hip hop
- Label: Cross Movement Records

The Cross Movement chronology
Holy Culture (2003)	Higher Definition (2004)	Chronicles (Greatest Hits, Vol. 1) (2006)

Higher Definition is the 5th album from the Christian hip hop group the Cross Movement, released on October 26, 2004.

The Lexington Herald-Leader commented that alongside the growing movement of Christian hip-hop, the album served as a "statement of faith and an antidote to hip-hop emphasizing bling, blunts".

== Track listing ==
No.	Title	Length
1.	"Civilian Affairs"	4:29
2.	"Redefined"	4:22
3.	"It's Time"	3:39
4.	"Hey Y'all"	3:58
5.	"Lord You Are" (feat. Michelle Bonilla)	5:36
6.	"Hip-Hop-Cracy"	4:46
7.	"Card Shark"	4:40
8.	"Questions"	4:03
9.	"On In Here"	4:32
10.	"Jerseys & Fitteds"	4:20
11.	"Big Words"	3:49
12.	"Epiphany"	4:19
13.	"Check for Us"	4:10
14.	"We"	4:10
15.	"My Life Cypha" (feat. Timothy Brindle, Shai Linne, & Redeemed Thought)	5:01

Bonus Tracks
No.	Title	Length
16.	"The Bridge"	5:00
17.	"Life, Camera, Action"	4:43
