= Forward (Flame album) =

Studio album by Flame
- Released: July 17, 2015
- Genre: Christian hip hop
- Length: 52:33
- Label: Clear Sight

Flame chronology
Royal Flush (2013)	Forward (2015)	God Knows (2018)

Forward is the eighth studio album from Flame. Clear Sight Music released the project on July 17, 2015. The album charted on three Billboard magazine charts.

== Critical reception ==
Professional ratings
Review scores
Source	Rating
CCM Magazine	4/5 stars
The Christian Beat	5/5 stars
The Christian Manifesto	4/5 stars

Awarding the album four stars from CCM Magazine, Matt Conner states, "Through it all, Flame addresses the global church with a potent cocktail of truth and chastisement, hope and love." The Christian Manifesto rating the album four stars, writes, "Forward is the lyrical version of those books on my shelves." James Fields, giving the album five stars at The Christian Beat, describes, "he has produced a high quality album with a timely message and great lyrical delivery using many rap styles."

== Tracks ==
No.	Title	Length
1.	"Fwd"	0:34
2.	"1st Freedom"	4:48
3.	"Know the Times"	3:55
4.	"Believe That"	4:18
5.	"Made Me Do"	4:09
6.	"The Greatest"	3:52
7.	"Positively Eternal"	4:33
8.	"Human Dignity"	0:44
9.	"Move Forward" (featuring Jai)	4:32
10.	"Absolute Truth"	5:28
11.	"You Ready?"	3:23
12.	"Had Me Flexin'" (featuring Mike Real)	3:51
13.	"We Gon' Reign"	4:47
14.	"Let It Shine" (featuring Melinda Watts)	3:39
Total length:		52:33

== Charts ==
Chart (2015)	Peak position
US Christian Albums (Billboard)	9
US Independent Albums (Billboard)	33
US Top Rap Albums (Billboard)	22
