= The Whole Truth (Da' T.R.U.T.H. album) =

Studio album by Da' T.R.U.T.H.
- Released: September 13, 2011
- Recorded: 2010–2011
- Genre: Christian hip hop, urban contemporary gospel
- Length: 67:34
- Label: 220/Xist

Da' T.R.U.T.H. chronology
| The Big Picture (2009) | The Whole Truth (2011) | Love Hope War (2013) |

The Whole Truth is the fifth studio album from Christian hip hop recording artist Da' T.R.U.T.H. It was released on September 13, 2011 by 220 Entertainment and Xist Music. The album charted at No. 109 on the Billboard 200.

== Background ==
On September 13, 2011, the fifth studio album from Christian hip hop musician Da' T.R.U.T.H. was released by 220 Entertainment and Xist Music, and it is entitled The Whole Truth.

== Critical reception ==
Professional ratings
Review scores
| Source | Rating |
|---|---|
| AllMusic | 3.5/5 stars |
| CCM Magazine | 3/5 stars |
| The Christian Manifesto | 4.5/5 stars |
| Rapzilla | 3.5/5 stars |

The Whole Truth garnered positive reception from the ratings and reviews of four music critics. Andrew Greer of CCM Magazine rated the album three stars, stating that on the release the artist "expertly interjects his hopeful hip-hop with intelligible rhymes, infectious melodies and eternal truths." David Jeffries of AllMusic rated the album three-and-a-half stars, writing that "Confessional lyrics recall the early days while the beats point toward a chart-topping future and the blend generally works". At Rapzilla, Christina Faith rated the album three-and-a-half stars, saying that on "a solid offering" the artist is at "his most honest and most encouraging." The Christian Manifesto's Aaron Peterson rated the album four-and-a-half stars, remarking how this release as compared to its predecessor "was much better!"

== Commercial performance ==
For the Billboard charting week of October 1, 2011, The Whole Truth was the No. 109 most sold album in the entirety of the United States, and it was the Nos. 5 and 2 most sold albums on the Christian Albums and Top Gospel Albums charts respectively. In addition, it was the No. 11 most sold on the Rap Albums chart that same week, along with being, the No. 25 most sold on the Independent Albums chart.

== Track listing ==
lights
| No. | Title | Length |
|---|---|---|
| 1. | "Lights" | 4:34 |
| 2. | "Impossible" (featuring Pastor AD3) | 4:26 |
| 3. | "Without God" | 3:37 |
| 4. | "Freedom" (featuring Donielle Rodwell) | 4:13 |
| 5. | "The Whole Truth" (featuring Mia Fieldes) | 4:34 |
| 6. | "Forgiveness" | 4:51 |
| 7. | "Can't Believe" (featuring Eric Greene, Jr.) | 3:51 |
| 8. | "Do It For You" (featuring Irving Washington) | 3:24 |
| 9. | "Brainwashed" (featuring Prayz1) | 4:55 |
| 10. | "Survivor" (featuring Suzy Rock and Sean Simmonds) | 4:28 |
| 11. | "Ain't Goin Back" (featuring Malski) | 4:24 |
| 12. | "God Is Good" | 4:08 |
| 13. | "Alive" | 3:21 |
| 14. | "Alive (Remix)" (featuring GKid and Jahaziel) | 4:30 |
| 15. | "Cherished" (featuring CeCe Winans) | 4:12 |
| 16. | "Go Misfit Go" (featuring The Ambassador, Sean Simmonds, Mali Music and DoubleEdge) | 4:06 |
| Total length: | | 67:34 |

== Charts ==
| Chart (2014) | Peak position |
|---|---|
| US Billboard 200 | 109 |
| US Christian Albums (Billboard) | 5 |
| US Top Gospel Albums (Billboard) | 2 |
| US Independent Albums (Billboard) | 25 |
| US Top Rap Albums (Billboard) | 11 |
