= It's Complicated (album) =

Studio album by Da' T.R.U.T.H.
- Released: June 3, 2016
- Genre: Christian hip hop
- Length: 57:37
- Label: Mixed Bag, Next

Da' T.R.U.T.H. chronology
Heartbeat (2014)	It's Complicated (2016)

It's Complicated is the eighth studio album by Da' T.R.U.T.H. Mixed Bag Music alongside Next Music released the album on June 3, 2016.

== Critical reception ==
Professional ratings
Review scores
Source	Rating
CCM Magazine	4/5 stars
Jesus Freak Hideout	3.5/5 stars

Awarding the album four stars at CCM Magazine, Andy Argyrakis writes, "Da’ T.R.U.T.H. rolls up his sleeves and digs right into the complexities of religion throughout It's Complicated, Vol. 1." Kevin Hoskins, giving the album three and a half stars from Jesus Freak Hideout, states, " not all is great on It's Complicated. Somewhere around the middle of the album, the music turns into something unpleasant to the ears."

== Track listing ==
No.	Title	Length
1.	"Meeting of the Minds" (featuring Ravi Zacharias)	0:58
2.	"The Greatest Need"	4:20
3.	"Mixed Signals" (featuring Ravi Zacharias and Natalie Sims)	3:49
4.	"Judge"	5:29
5.	"Why so Serious" (featuring KB)	4:07
6.	"Religion" (featuring Ravi Zacharias)	4:29
7.	"Misconceptions" (featuring Ravi Zacharias)	4:29
8.	"Heaven" (featuring Christon Gray)	6:21
9.	"The Reason"	4:27
10.	"Perfectly Human" (featuring Natalie Sims)	4:05
11.	"Copycat"	5:03
12.	"Copycat Interlude" (featuring Ravi Zacharias)	2:15
13.	"Color Purple"	3:19
14.	"The Vow"	4:26
Total length:		57:37

== Charts ==
Chart (2016)	Peak position
US Christian Albums (Billboard)	5
US Independent Albums (Billboard)	39
US Top Rap Albums (Billboard)	11
