= Complication =

Complication or complications may refer to:

== Dramatic arts ==
- "Complications" (CSI: Miami), an episode of CSI: Miami
- "Complications" (Terminator: The Sarah Connor Chronicles), an episode of Terminator: The Sarah Connor Chronicles
- Complications (TV series), a 2015 USA Network television series starring Jason O'Mara

== Medicine ==
- Complication (medicine), an unfavorable evolution of a disease, health condition or medical treatment

== Music ==
=== Albums ===
- Complications - Trilogy of Intricacy, a 2005 EP by Norwegian progressive metal band Age of Silence
- Complications (Dover album), a 2015 album by Spanish rock band Dover

=== Songs ===
- "Complications", a 1980 song by Killing Joke from Killing Joke
- "Complication", a 1999 song by Nine Inch Nails from The Fragile
- "Complications", a 2008 song by deadmau5 from Random Album Title

== Technology ==
- Complication (horology), a clock display other than the time
