= R-Swift =

American rapper (born 1981)

- Also known as: Swift
- Born: Rodnie Jerome Graham, Jr. October 15, 1981 (age 44); Long Island, New York, U.S.
- Origin: Philadelphia, Pennsylvania; Atlanta, Georgia, U.S.
- Genres: Christian hip hop, urban contemporary gospel
- Occupations: Singer, songwriter
- Instruments: vocals, singer-songwriter
- Years active: 2003–present
- Labels: I-66, Cross Movement, Central South, Rhyme Council, Xist

Rodnie Jerome Graham Jr. (born October 15, 1981), who goes by the stage name Swift but formerly R-Swift, is an American Christian hip hop musician. His first album, Elevation 81.02, was released in 2003, with I-66 Entertainment. The second album, Revolutionary Theme Muzik, was released with Cross Movement Records in 2007. In 2008, he released his third album, Soapbox, which became his first album to debut on the Billboard Top Gospel Albums charts. His fourth album, Anthem, released in 2009 and also reached the chart. The fifth album, Apply Pressure, with Rhyme Council and Central South, was released in 2013 and received notoriety on Christian Albums. He is now signed to Xist.

== Early life ==
Rodnie Jerome Graham Jr. was born on October 15, 1981, as in Long Island, New York. He later moved to Philadelphia, Pennsylvania, where he resided as a child and young adult.

== Personal life ==
Graham is married to Stacey, who is a cancer survivor, and together they now reside in Atlanta, Georgia. They have three daughters, Shayla, Jasmine, and Summer. Their only son, Rodnie Jerome Graham III, died in 2009.

== Music career ==
His first album Elevation 81.02 was released in 2003, with I-66 Entertainment, the second album Revolutionary Theme Muzik was released with Cross Movement Records on June 19, 2007. On June 10, 2008, he released, his third album, Soapbox, that was his first album to debut on the Billboard Top Gospel Albums charts at No. 20. His fourth album would do likewise at No. 22, which was released on October 6, 2009, Anthem, also with Cross Movement. The fifth album, Apply Pressure, with Rhyme Council and Central South, was released on June 11, 2013, and this got on the aforementioned chart at No. 21, as well as, Christian Albums at No. 46. He is presently signed to Xist Music.

== Discography ==
=== Studio albums ===
List of studio albums, with selected chart positions
Title	Album details	Peak chart positions	
Title	Album details	US Chr	US Gos
Elevation 81.02	Released: September 15, 2003; Label: I-66; CD, digital download	–	–
Revolutionary Theme Muzik	Released: June 19, 2007; Label: Cross Movement; CD, digital download	–	–
Soapbox	Released: June 10, 2008; Label: Cross Movement; CD, digital download	–	20
Anthem	Released: October 6, 2009; Label: Cross Movement; CD, digital download	–	22
Apply Pressure	Released: June 11, 2013; Label: Central South/Rhyme Council; CD, digital download	46	21
Higher Learning	Released: June 17, 2016; Label: Xist Music/Malaco; digital download	–	–
