= Phanatik =

American rapper

- Born: Brady Goodwin Jr. December 2, 1976 (age 49)
- Origin: Philadelphia, Pennsylvania, US
- Genres: East Coast hip hop, alternative hip hop
- Occupations: Rapper, Author
- Instrument: Vocals
- Years active: 1994-2022
- Label: Cross Movement Records
- Formerly of: The Cross Movement, 116 Clique

Brady Goodwin Jr. (born December 2, 1976), better known by his stage name Phanatik, is an American East Coast rapper and author who has recorded both independently and as a founding member of the two time Grammy-nominated Christian rap group The Cross Movement.

== Career ==
His debut album, 95 Til Infinity, was released independently in 1995, after the break-up of his rap group, The Righteous Gang. It was produced by future Cross Movement member Tru-Life.

His second album entitled The Incredible Walk, was released on February 22, 2005. Phanatik has since released three other solo albums (Crime & Consequences, Party Over Here and The Art of Battle Rap). Phanatik is known for his creative concepts, wordplay or "witty word wizardry" and story telling. His "on beat - off beat" style has been described as a "Thinking man's flow."

In 2008, Goodwin began a 2nd career teaching Character Education in Philadelphia public schools. This led the former rapper to develop his own course and curriculum which he titled "Hip Hop & Ethics." He currently teaches this course at Gratz High School and the Community College of Philadelphia. In 2015 the former rapper expanded his professorial roster when he began teaching courses in apologetics, biblical studies and cultural engagement at C.U.T.S. (the Center for Urban Theological Studies) in Philadelphia.

As an author, his first book, The Death of Hip Hop, Marriage & Morals became available in August 2010. His second and third books City of Allegory (Part 1 and Part 2) were released in November 2011 and November 2012 respectively. The author released two more books, From Hip Hop to Hollywood: The Art of Christianity and Navigating the N Word in March 2013 and December 2015 respectively. He holds a Bachelor of Science degree in Bible and Christian Service from Lancaster Bible College (2009) and a master's degree from Westminster Theological Seminary in Philadelphia (2015).

In January 2022, it was reported that Phanatik had renounced Christianity. But has stated that he is currently in a process of returning to his former faith.

== Discography ==
=== Albums ===
Year	Album
1995	95 Til Infinity: First solo studio album; Released: 1995
2005	The Incredible Walk: Second solo studio album; Released: February 22, 2005
2007	Crime & Consequences: Third solo studio album; Released: November 6, 2007
2010	Party Over Here: Fourth solo studio album; Released: November 23, 2010
2014	The Art of Battle Rap: Fifth solo studio album; Released July 12, 2014

=== Guest appearances ===
- "Mic Check 1 2" by shai linne featuring Stephen the Levite
- "Hold Your Ground" by The Ambassador
- "Hands In The Air" by The Ambassador featuring Enock
- "From the Mid to the East Cypha" by FLAME featuring Azriel, Da' T.R.U.T.H., E-Licia, J-Silas, J-Son, R-Swift, Thi'sl
- "Everyday All Day Cypha" by Everyday Process featuring Lecrae, The Ambassador, FLAME, R-Swift
- "On Now" by Tedashii
- "How Dare Us" by Young Joshua
- "Not My Own" by DJ Official featuring Stephen the Levite, Evangel
- "The Pharisee and the Tax Collector" by Timothy Brindle (featuring Phanatik & Json)

=== With The Cross Movement ===
- "Heaven's Mentality" (1997)
- "House of Representatives" (1998)
- "Human Emergency" (2000)
- "Holy Culture" (2003)
- "Gift Rap" (2004)
- "Higher Definition" (2004)
- "HIStory: Our Place In His Story" (2007)

== See also ==
- The Cross Movement
- Cross Movement Records
