= Da' T.R.U.T.H. =

American rapper

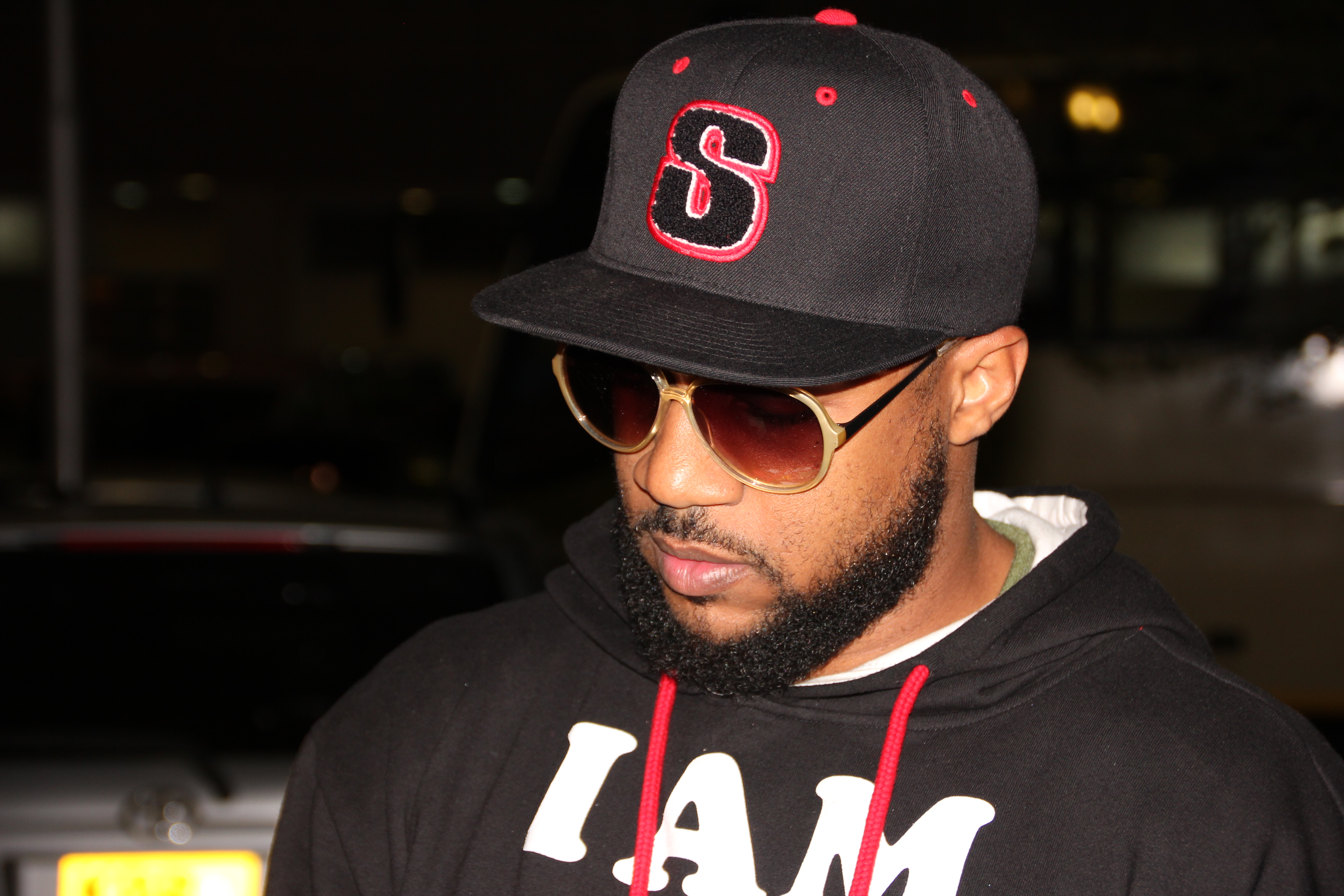
- Da' T.R.U.T.H. on a recent tour in Nairobi, Kenya

Background information
- Also known as: Da' T.R.U.T.H.
- Born: Emanuel Lee Lambert, Jr. December 15, 1977 (age 48)
- Origin: Philadelphia, Pennsylvania, U.S.
- Genres: Christian hip hop, urban contemporary gospel
- Occupation: Rapper
- Years active: 2003–present
- Labels: Cross Movement, Xist, Mixed Bag
- Website: mixedbagent.com

Emanuel Lee Lambert Jr. (born December 15, 1977) is a Christian rapper who goes by the stage name Da' T.R.U.T.H. His album Emanuel was nominated for a Grammy Award for Best Contemporary Christian Music Album in 2024.

== Biography ==
Lambert is a graduate of Cairn University, formerly Philadelphia Biblical University.

The Faith won a 2007 Stellar Award in the "Rap/Hip Hop Gospel CD of the Year" category. BET, Lift Every Voice, INSP's Steelroots, Mixx Master's Lounge, Revelation TV's The One to One Show, Word Network's Bobby Jones Gospel, VIBE, New Man magazine, and Source Magazine have featured Da' Truth and his music.

He is a close friend of Kirk Franklin, and has toured with him.

In 2009, Lambert released his fourth album, The Big Picture, which features collaborations with Kirk Franklin, Trip Lee, and Tye Tribbett. This project hit No. 1 on the iTunes Christian & Gospel Chart on the day it came out, also reaching No. 1 on the CMTA R&B/Hip Hop Chart, No. 2 on the Billboard Gospel chart, and No. 4 on the Billboard Contemporary Christian chart during release week. He released Emanuel on 27 January 2023, on Mixed Media Entertainment.

== Discography ==
=== Studio albums ===
Year	Album	Chart positions					
Year	Album	U.S.	U.S. Christ	U.S. Gospel	U.S. Rap	U.S. Ind.	U.S. Heat
2004	Moment of Truth: Released: April 6, 2004; Label: Cross Movement Records	—	—	—	—	—	45
2005	The Faith: Released: September 13, 2005; Label: Cross Movement Records	—	24	7	—	—	34
2007	Open Book: Released: July 10, 2007; Label: Cross Movement Records	—	5	2	—	29	—
2009	The Big Picture: Released: July 21, 2009; Label: Cross Movement Records	110	4	2	—	—	—
2011	The Whole Truth: Released: September 13, 2011; Label: Universal Music Christian Group	109	5	2	11	25	—
2013	Love Hope War: Released: January 29, 2013; Label: Infinity Music Distribution (CSD)	88	5	2	10	11	—
2014	Heartbeat: Released: April 15, 2014; Label: Mixed Bag Records, eOne Distribution	84	7	2	8	16	—
2016	It's Complicated: Released: June 3, 2016; Label: Mixed Bag Records, Next Music, eOne Distribution	—	5	—	11	39	—

=== DVDs ===
Year	Album
2007	Da' T.R.U.T.H. & Friends LIVE!: Released: May 15, 2007

=== Guest appearances ===
- "No One Greater" by J-Flo
- "When You Step" by FLAME
- "Sinti (Without You)" by Michelle Bonilla
- "Feels Good" by The Ambassador featuring La'Tia & Keran
- "L.A.D.I.E.S." by FLAME
- "From the Mid to the East Cypha" by FLAME featuring Azriel, E-Licia, J-Silas, J-Son, Phanatik, R-Swift & Thi'sl
- "Eternal Cypha" by The Cross Movement featuring J-Silas, Todd Bangz, R-Swift & FLAME
- "Spirit Moves (Remix)" by DJ Maj featuring Out Of Eden
- "Everyday" featuring Tia Pittman
- "The Light" by The Cross Movement
- "I Like Me" by Kirk Franklin
- "Ridaz" by J.R. featuring Trip Lee & Iz-Real
- "Love & Grace" by The Ambassador featuring J.R.
- "Identity" by Lecrae featuring J.R.
- "Swagged Out With Tags Out" by KJ-52
- "I'm Alive Remix" by Jahaziel featuring G KiD & The Ambassador
- "J-E-S-U-S" by Anthony Brown & group therapy featuring Michelle Thompson
- "Worshipping Tonight" by V. Rose

== Personal life ==
Lambert was married to gospel artist Bri Babineaux as of 2024.

Lambert was previously married to Nicole Lambert, and is the father of two daughters. In 2009, after six months of silence on rumored issues, Lambert admitted to a retaliatory extramarital affair with Shanté Tribbett, the wife of Tye Tribbett, a friend and fellow gospel artist, who himself had been in an extramarital affair with a woman from his choir. Shanté had turned to Lambert, a close friend and confidant, for counseling. Their relationship became sexual, and Lambert later announced that he would temporarily step down from his ministerial role and admitted to disappointing his wife and children. Cross Movement Records, Lambert's then label, suspended him following the affair's revelation. Lambert reconciled with his wife by June 15, 2010, and they celebrated a re-commitment ceremony on their eighth wedding anniversary. They divorced in 2023.
