= The Cross Movement =

American hip hop group

- Origin: Philadelphia, Pennsylvania, U.S.
- Genres: Christian hip hop, East Coast hip hop, alternative hip hop
- Years active: 1996 – 2008
- Labels: Seventh Street/Diamante, Cross Movement, BEC
- Members: The Ambassador (William Branch); Cruz Cordero; Enock; Earthquake; The Tonic (John Wells); Phanatik (Brady Goodwin Jr.); T.R.U.-L.I.F.E. (Virgil Byrd)
- Website: crossmovementrecords.com

The Cross Movement was a Christian hip hop group from Philadelphia, Pennsylvania.

== Members ==
The Cross Movement (CM) which was composed of several rappers: The Ambassador (William Branch), The Tonic (John Wells), Phanatik (Brady Goodwin), T.R.U.-L.I.F.E (Virgil Byrd), Cruz Cordero, Enock (Juan James), and Earthquake (Cleve Foat). The CM also frequently collaborated with the Christian disc jockey, DJ Official (Nelson Chu). The CM's niche has been to translate biblical and Christian theology into rap music by using the same hyper-aggressive lyrics, sampled orchestral riffs, alliteration and virtuoso delivery of many mainstream rappers without the self-aggrandizing and violent lyrics, or the materialistic imagery stereotypically associated with many rappers.

=== The Ambassador ===
A graduate of Dallas Theological Seminary, William "Duce" Branch a.k.a. The Ambassador is the co-planter (along with label mate and founding Cross Movement member Cruz Cordero) of Epiphany Fellowship in Philadelphia, PA. He has toured globally as a solo artist and with The Cross Movement and been covered by media outlets as diverse as Time Magazine, CCM Magazine, VIBE, The Source, Billboard and The Washington Post, Philadelphia Inquirer and more. He has also served as the president of the non-profit organization Cross Movement Ministries and ministered the gospel through rap and preaching for nearly 15 years. With a passionate commitment to the kingdom of Christ as well as a firm belief that faith must integrate with culture, The Ambassador has become known for his devotion to proclaiming Jesus Christ to urban contexts, and through urban mediums.

Building on the success of his sophomore solo project "The Thesis" and his Grammy- and Stellar-nominated release HIStory with group The Cross Movement, The Ambassador follows with The Chop Chop—an album with production by J.R., Official, Tony Stone and HOTHANDZ topped with an uncompromising message that will challenge listeners, while exposing the authenticity and supremacy of God.

“The Chop Chop: From Milk to Meat” is both an invitation and an exhortation from the Grammy, GMA Dove and Stellar nominated artist to rally those who are hungry for truth and determined to mature. “The current trend in our culture—and sadly in the church—is to ‘dumb down’ almost everything. Some things require a little more intensity, commitment and grind, and our faith is certainly one of those jewels,” states The Ambassador.

With special guest appearances by Lecrae, Trip Lee, Da' T.R.U.T.H. and Stephen the Levite, The Chop Chop calls all hearers to take the meat of God's weighty truth and "chop it up," chew it until it becomes a part of them.

Following the single "Gimme Dat!", The Chop Chop has been called "a project that fires on all cylinders". Already embraced by broadcast Gospel outlets, The Ambassador performed "Gimme Dat!" on TBN's "Praise The Lord" and on TV One's "The Gospel of Music with Jeff Majors", as well as INSP's "Mixx Masters Lounge".

== Cross Movement Records ==
Cross Movement Records (CMR), is responsible for producing and marketing the albums of the CM, its individual members' solo albums, and other Christian hip hop artists such as Da' T.R.U.T.H. and FLAME.

== Ministry Group ==
The third aspect of the Cross Movement is the incorporated, 501(c)3 non-profit organization called Cross Movement Ministries, Inc (CMM), which aims to use creative ways to spread the Christian gospel message within hip hop culture. Booking for Cross Movement (CM) the group was actually managed by this non-profit ministry arm, which also included a team of both full-time & part-time ministry staff members & volunteers.

== Nomenclature ==
Since its inception, The Cross Movement has chosen to define itself as the Christian or holy division of hip hop culture as opposed to the hip hop or rap division of Christian culture. Within the genre of rap music, there are various subgenres such as gangsta rap, Conscious rap, old school rap, crunk, and reggaeton, but all of it falls under the rubric of rap and, by extension, hip hop. In choosing to define their music as simply being another subgenre – i.e., the Christian rap subgenre – of hip hop culture, the CM attempts to "keep it real" in order to maintain the validity needed to influence members of hip hop culture who may or may not be Christians. In their 2003 release, Holy Culture, the CM stated their reasoning is based on a passage from the Bible, John 17:15-19 in which Jesus said to God:

“My prayer is not that you take them out of the world but that you protect them from the evil one. They are not of the world, even as I am not of it. Sanctify them by the truth; your word is truth. As you sent me into the world, I have sent them into the world. For them I sanctify myself, that they too may be truly sanctified.”

As the word sanctified means "to set apart", the interpretation maintained by the CM is that they are instructed by Jesus to remain a part of hip hop culture while being set apart from the majority of the followers of hip hop culture in order to influence it from within to conform to the mores and moral code preached by followers of Christ. The acceptance of this interpretation has been mixed, however. Despite their claim to be a part of hip hop culture, the CM has slowly found more acceptance, though not total acceptance, in the Christian community than in the secular hip hop community as the majority of their concerts are held at churches or church-sponsored events as opposed to secular venues. In 2006, the CM received a Grammy nomination for "Best Rock Gospel Album," as opposed to any of the traditional hip hop or rap categories. Additionally, the CM has generally only been recognized at Christian and Gospel awards shows such as the Dove Awards or Stellar Awards as opposed to hip hop-only award shows such as the Source Awards or the Vibe Awards.

== Videography ==
- "The Cross Movement: Holy Culture Live" 2004
