= Flame (rapper) =

American rapper (born 1981)

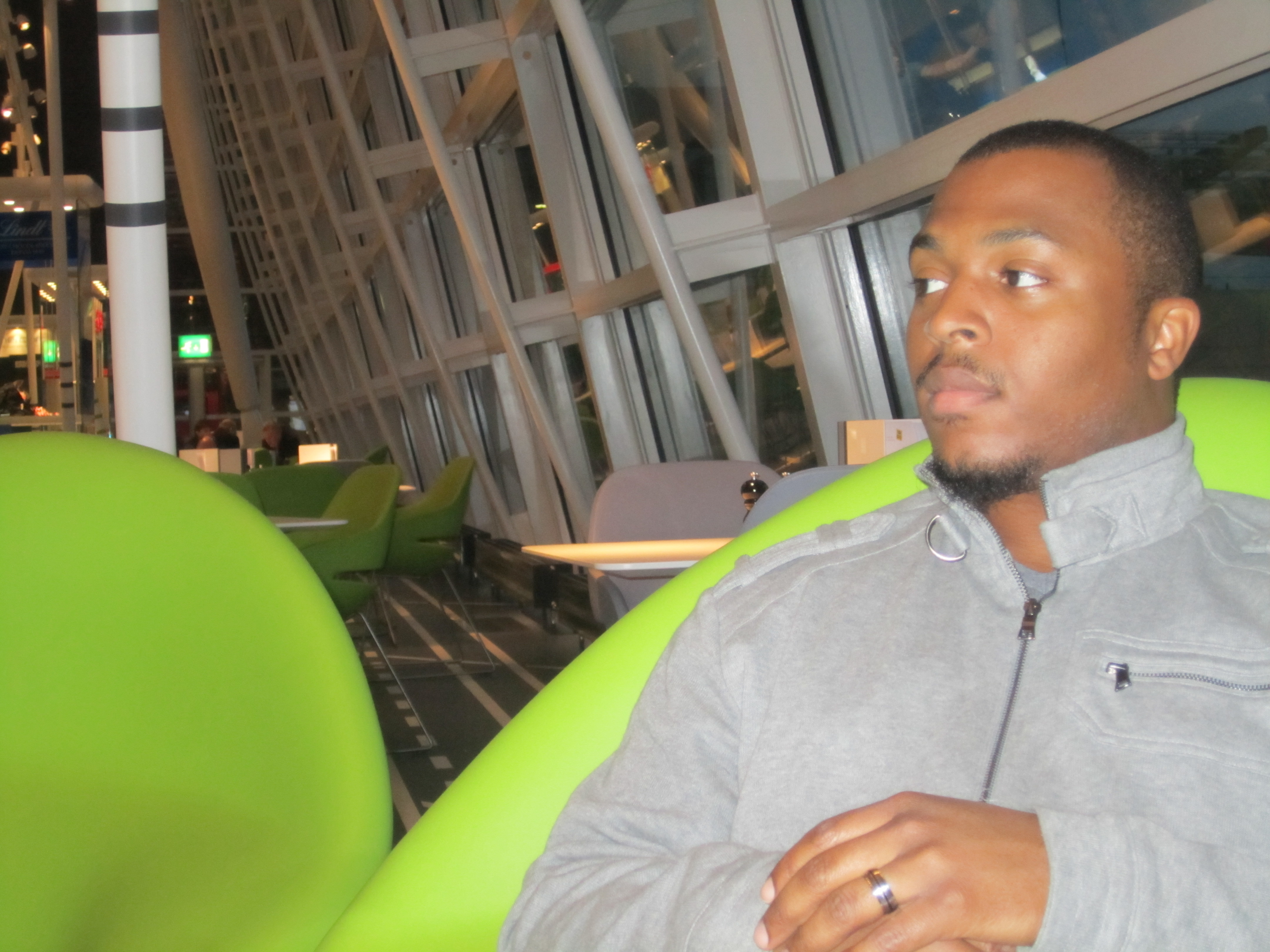
- FLAME in 2011

Background information
- Born: Marcus Tyrone Gray; September 16, 1981 (age 45)
- Origin: St. Louis, Missouri U.S.
- Genre: Christian hip hop
- Occupations: Rapper, actor, music executive
- Instrument: Vocals
- Years active: 2003–present
- Label: Clear Sight Music
- Website: clearsightmusic.com

Marcus Tyrone Gray (born September 16, 1981), known as Flame (often stylized in all caps), is a Lutheran Christian hip hop rapper from the United States. Gray came to Christ in a Full Gospel Baptist Church in St. Louis. He is with Clear Sight Music and has released nine albums. Flame has been nominated for several Dove and Stellar Awards. The Our World: Redeemed album was nominated for a Grammy Award.

== Biography ==
As of 2005, Flame sold over 35,000 albums, and one of his interludes from his first album was played on Busch Stadium's loudspeakers every time Albert Pujols came to bat.

On February 20, 2007, it was announced that Flame's track, "Gotta Notice", from the album Rewind was nominated for the 38th Annual GMA Dove Awards in the category Rap/Hip Hop Recorded Song of the Year. In mid-2007, Flame joined the rest of Cross Movement for their final tour. Our World Redeemed was nominated for a Stellar Award, Dove Award, and Grammy Award. In 2009, Flame was a special guest on Reach Records 116 Clique's tour Don't Waste Your Life.

In 2010, Flame announced a new album titled Captured.

He studied at Boyce College and obtained a Bachelor of Arts.

In 2014, Flame, along with three other musicians, filed a lawsuit against Katy Perry for alleged copyright infringement. In the suit, Perry was accused of stealing production elements from Flame's gospel track "Joyful Noise", in her song "Dark Horse". Flame and the other plaintiffs involved in the suit claimed that, not only did Perry use appropriate elements of the song, but that the video tarnished their production by using imagery associated with black magic and witchcraft, ideologies that Flame strongly opposes. It was originally reported that the matter had been settled out of court; however, as of late 2018, the case was set to go to trial. On July 29, 2019, a jury sided with Flame, leaving Perry to pay $550,000 and her label to pay the remaining $2.78 million. On March 17, 2020, Judge Christina A. Snyder overturned the jury award, citing numerous factors, including that the musical theme was both simple and common, and that the evidence given did not support the jury's award. Snyder vacated the jury's verdict and denied motions for a new trial, but stated that, should the case be heard on appeal at the Ninth Circuit, a new jury trial would be required. Flame filed a notice of appeal at the Ninth Circuit on April 13, 2020. In March 2022, the Ninth Circuit ruled in Perry's favor, upholding the vacation ruling from the District Court. The courts found the ostinatos in question unrelated, failed to meet the threshold of originality required for protection, and granted JMOL to defendants.

In March 2020, Flame left the Reformed tradition and was received into the Lutheran Church. His EP Christ for You focuses on the Lutheran belief in the real presence of Christ in the Eucharist, citing the Church Fathers such as Justin Martyr, Augustine of Hippo, Irenaeus, Cyril and Thomas Aquinas (cf. Eucharist in Lutheranism). Reflecting on his Lutheran Christian faith, Flame rejoiced: "It wasn't until I stumbled upon Lutheran thought that I discovered the treasure found in the liturgical and sacramental side of things." He praised the Lutheran tradition for its "ancient truths that will comfort contemporary consciences" and said that those "Truths that will bring people out of their heads and lift their heads from navel-gazing onto the sweet means of grace that God has provided outside of us." Flame named his album Christ for You as he wants his fans "to experience the joy and freedom that I’ve found in the sacraments." (cf. Lutheran sacraments)

In 2020, Marcus Gray earned his Master of Arts degree from Concordia Seminary in Systematic Theology, with minors in Church History, as well as Counseling.

== Discography ==
=== Studio albums ===
Year	Album
2004	Flame: First studio album; Sold over 98,000; Released: October 12, 2004
2005	Rewind: Second studio album; Sold over 74,000; GMA Dove Award Nominee for Best Rap/Hip Hop Recorded Song of the Year for "Gotta Notice"; Released: December 6, 2005
2007	Our World: Fallen: Third studio album; Released: April 17, 2007; First album in a two-album series.; "The album is a passionate, but basic, explanation of God's pursuit for His created people," Flame says. "It's very simple, but it's a very informative appeal for people to run to Christ."
2008	Our World: Redeemed: Released: March 4, 2008; Fourth studio album; Second album in a two-album series; Stellar Award Nominee for Rap Album of the Year; GMA Dove Award Nominee for Best Rap/Hip Hop Recorded Song of the Year for "Joyful Noise"; Nominated for a Grammy Award for Best Rock or Rap Gospel Album.; The last of Flame's albums released with Cross Movement Records.
2010	Captured: Fifth studio album; Released: December 28, 2010; Stellar Award Nominee for Rap Album of the Year; GMA Dove Award Nominee for Best Rap/Hip Hop Album of the Year and Best Urban Recorded Song for "All I Need"; No. 1 on Billboard Gospel (January 2011); No. 5 on Billboard Christian (January 2011); No. 17 on Billboard Rap (January 2011); No. 152 on Billboard 200 (January 2011); No. 11 on Billboard Independent (January 2011)
2012	The 6th: Sixth studio album; Release Date: March 6, 2012; Stellar Award Nominee for Rap Album of the Year; No. 1 on Billboard Gospel; No. 2 on Billboard Christian; No. 8 on Billboard Rap; No. 67 on Billboard Top 200; No. 8 on Billboard Independent; No. 1 on iTunes Rap (March 2012); No. 8 on iTunes Top Albums (March 2012)
2013	Royal Flush: Seventh studio album; Release Date: October 1, 2013; Dove Award Nomination for Rap Album of the Year
2015	Forward: Eighth studio album; Release Date: July 17, 2015; Stellar Award Nomination for Rap Album of the Year; Dove Award Nomination for Rap Album of the Year
2018	God Knows: Ninth studio album; Release Date: March 2, 2018; Stellar Award Rap Album Of The Year
2020	Extra Nos: Tenth studio project; First EP project; First project as a Lutheran; Release Date: January 24, 2020
2021	Christ for You: Eleventh studio project; Conceptually focused on the Lutheran Doctrine of the Lord's Supper; Release Date: January 29, 2021
2022	Word And Water: Twelfth studio project; Conceptually focused on the Lutheran Doctrine of Holy Baptism; Release Date: April 29, 2022
