= Cross Movement Records =

- Founded: 1997
- Genre: Christian hip hop
- Country of origin: United States
- Location: Philadelphia, Pennsylvania
- Official website: crossmovementrecords.com

Cross Movement Records is an American-based Christian hip hop record label founded by The Cross Movement.

CMR, founded in 1997, had an agreement with BEC Recordings. In 2005 they made a license agreement with Reach Records' Lecrae. CMR was to release his first three solo albums. Hence solidifying the label's span of music, including Da' T.R.U.T.H. and the Cross Movement for the East Coast, and the Midwest with the artists FLAME and J.R.

In 2006 a new imprint was made, Issachar Recordings, meant to release albums with different musical styles than hip hop. The first album of the label was Michelle Bonilla's R&B album: "Phenomenal" (2006).

In 2007, the hip-hop duo Everyday Process was added to the CMR roster as well as Rhyme Council artist, R-Swift. In 2010 CMR signed K-Drama, Philadelphia artist Young Joshua, and DJ group Level 3:16.

== Artists ==
- The Tonic – John Wells
- Phanatik – Brady Goodwin Jr.
- The Cross Movement (disbanded in 2007)
- Lecrae (Was licensed and now with Reach Records)
- Da' T.R.U.T.H. – Emanuel Lambert
- The Ambassador – William Branch
- DJ Official (was with Reach Records, deceased)
- Everyday Process
- Michelle Bonilla
- K-Drama
- Young Joshua
- 6 Way St. (FKA Level 3:16)
- FLAME – Marcus Gray (Active, signed to and owns Clear Sight Music)
- J.R.
- R-Swift (also with Rhyme Council)
- Cruz Cordero
- Enoch (also with Much Luv Fam) (deceased)
