= Derek Minor discography =

- Studio albums: 6
- Singles: 23
- Mixtapes: 5
- Collaborative: 1
- Guest appearances: 27

The discography of Christian hip-hop artist Derek Minor, formerly known as PRo, consists of five studio albums and seven mixtapes as a solo artist, one studio album each with the groups R.M.G. and 116 Clique, twenty-three singles, including eight as a featured artist and three with R.M.G. and one with 116 Clique, and eleven music videos, including two as a featured artist and one each with R.M.G. and 116 Clique.

== Albums ==
=== Studio albums ===
Year	Title	Chart positions				
Year	Title	US	US Gospel	US Christ.	US Ind.	US Rap
2008	The Blackout (as PRo): First studio album; Released: October 31, 2008; Label: Reflection	—	—	—	—	—
2010	Redemption (as PRo): Second studio album; Released: July 13, 2010; Label: Reflection	—	8	31	—	—
2011	Dying to Live (as PRo): Third studio album; Released: August 23, 2011; Label: Reach/Reflection	66	2	1	7	11
2013	Minorville: Fourth studio album; Released: September 10, 2013; Label: Reach/Reflection	40	1	2	6	6
2015	Empire: Fifth studio album; Released: January 27, 2015; Label: Reflection/eOne	54	—	2	10	6
2016	Reflection: Sixth studio album; Released: October 14, 2016; Label: Reflection/eOne	114	—	7	15	5
2018	The Trap: Seventh studio album; Released: August 10, 2018; Label: Reflection/EMPIRE	—	—	26	—	—
2023	Nobody's Perfect: Eighth studio album; Released: August 25, 2023; Label: Reflection/EMPIRE	—	—	—	—	—
Note: Beginning in 2015, Billboard rendered most hip hop/rap albums ineligible for the Gospel charts

"—" denotes releases that did not chart.

=== With 116 Clique ===
Year	Title
2011	Man Up: Fourth studio album; Release Date: September 27, 2011; Label: Reach

=== With R.M.G. ===
Year	Title
2011	Welcome to the Family: First studio album; Release Date: May 27, 2011; Label: Reflection

=== Mixtapes ===
Year	Title
2006	The Pro Show: The Mixtape: First mixtape; Released: 2006; Label: Scyon
N/A	Transformers - The Mixtape: Second mixtape; Released: N/A
2008	Jackin' for Hits: Third mixtape; Released: 2008; Label: Independent
2008	My Name is Pro (the Introduction): Fourth mixtape; Released: 2008; Label: Reflection
2010	PSA: Fifth mixtape; Released: 2010; Label: Reflection
2011	PSA, Vol. 2: Sixth mixtape; Released: 2011; Label: Reach / Reflection
2012	PSA, Vol. 3: Who Is Derek Minor?: Seventh mixtape; Released: 2012; Label: Reach / Reflection
2019	Whole Team Winning (with Byron Juane and Canon): Eighth mixtape; Released: August 9, 2019; Label: Reach

=== Collaborative albums ===
Year	Title
2012	Xist Music Presents: MOVE Vol. 1 (various artists): Compilation album; Released: August 28, 2012; Label: Xist; Contributing track: "Straight" (with Andalé and D-Maub)

=== EPs ===
Year	Title	US Christian Albums
2016	1014: First EP; Release Date: August 2, 2016; Label: Reflection	—
2017	Your Soul Must Fly: Second EP; Release Date: September 1, 2017; Label: Reflection/EMPIRE	17
2017	High Above: Third EP; Release Date: November 10, 2017; Label: Reflection/EMPIRE	—
2019	Nothing But a Word (with Propaganda): Fourth EP; Release date: November 15, 2019; Label: EMPIRE/RMG	—

== Singles ==
=== As lead artist ===
Year	Title	Chart positions		Album
Year	Title	US Christ.	US Gospel	Album
2008	"Shut Em Down" (featuring Pettidee)	—	—	The Blackout
2009	"I'm Sorry"	—	—	Redemption
2009	"Bow Down" (featuring Brothatone)	—	—	Redemption
2009	"Murder Swag"	—	—	Redemption
2009	"Pass Away"	—	—	non-album single
2010	"Hold Me Down"	—	—	Redemption
2010	"Fight Music"	—	—	Redemption
2011	"116" (featuring KB)	—	—	non-album single
2011	"He Did That (KAA Theme Song)" (featuring Brothatone)	—	—	non-album single for Kids Across America
2011	"Mission to Mars"	—	—	Dying to Live
2011	"Before I Die"	—	—	Dying to Live
2012	"Where Do We Go from Here" (featuring ZG)	—	—	PSA Vol. 3: Who is Derek Minor?
2013	"Dear Mr. Christian" (featuring Dee-1 & Lecrae)	—	—	Minorville
2013	"Gimmie"	—	—	Minorville
2014	"Who You Know"	30	15	Empire
2014	"Party People" (featuring Social Club)	45	—	Empire
2016	"Free"	—	—	non-album single
2016	"You Know It"	—	—	Reflection
2016	"Until I'm Gone" (featuring BJ the Chicago Kid)	—	—	Reflection
2016	"Change The World" (featuring Hollyn)	43	—	Reflection
2017	"Fresh Prince"	39	—	non-album single
2018	"It's Not a Game" (with Canon)	—	—	non-album single
2019	"Dope" (with Propaganda)	—	—	Nothing But a Word (EP)
2019	"Change" (with Propaganda)	—	—	Nothing But a Word (EP)

=== Other charted songs ===
Year	Title	Chart positions		Album
Year	Title	US Christ.	US Gospel	Album
2014	"Undefeated" (KB featuring Derek Minor)	39	21	100 (EP)

=== As featured performer ===
Title	Year	Album
"All About U" (Chris Lee Cobbins featuring PRo)	2010	The Medicine
"Need it Daily" (Tedashii featuring PRo)	2011	Blacklight
"Game On" (Lecrae featuring PRo, Tedashii, & Jai)	2011	non-album single for Camp Kanakuk
"Endure" (Kareem Manuel featuring PRo)	2011	Until Forever
"The Morning" (Primisis featuring Derek Minor)	2012	Non-album single
"I'm Rooted" (Lecrae featuring Derek Minor)	2013	non-album single for KAA/Camp Kanakuk
"Rejuvenated" (Json featuring Future and Derek Minor)	2013	King Kulture: Stop the Traffic
"Royal Lies" (KIDD featuring Derek Minor and Gemstones)	2013	Murder My Flesh
"Take a Broken Heart" (V. Rose featuring Derek Minor)	2016	Young Dangerous Heart
"Greed Money Power" (Aaron Cole featuring Derek Minor and Beleaf)	2018	non-album single

=== With 116 Clique ===
Title	Year	Album
"Man Up Anthem"	2011	Man Up
"Authority"	2011	Man Up
"Come Alive"	2012	non-album single

=== With R.M.G. ===
Title	Year	Album
"Reppin' On Em"	2011	non-album single
"Geeked Up"	2012	Welcome to the Family
"Somebody to Love" (featuring Tiffany Michelle)	2012	Welcome to the Family

== Guest appearances ==
Title	Year	Other performer(s)	Album
"Homie Please"	2009	Andalé, Brothatone	White Flag
"Speaking Murder"	2009	Andalé, Kingston	White Flag
"Air Jordan Remix"	2009	k-Drama, Thi'sl, Json, Young Josh, J. Johnson	non-album single
"Inkredible"	2010	Bumps INF	Who is Mark James?
"My Life (Nice Aim)"	2010	Sho Baraka	Lions and Liars
"Covenant Eyes"	2010	Trip Lee	Between Two Worlds
"Twisted"	2010	Trip Lee, Lecrae, Thi'sl	Between Two Worlds
"Crank It Up"	2010	J'son	City Lights
"New Shalom"	2010	Lecrae	Rehab
"At the Throne	2010	Future	Endure
"Frontline"	2010	Future, Json	Endure
"King"	2011	Brothatone	Mic Check
"Let it Knock"	2011	Thi'sl	Beautiful Monster
"Holy"	2011	Blaze	Exposed
"I Got It"	2011	Blaze, Chris Lee Cobbins	Exposed
"Spaceship"	2011	Canon	Blind World
"Ready 2 Go"	2011	Dre' Sr., 1-Lyfe	The Maturation
"Full Court Mess (Tone Jonez Remix)"	2011	Tone Jonez, KB	non-album single
"New Shalom (Karac Dubstep Remix)"	2012	Lecrae	Rapzilla Presents... King Kulture
"Can't Fake It"	2012	Wit, Dre Murray, Alex Faith	Hell's Paradise II: The Mask Parade
"You Rydin"	2012	Reconcile, Corey Paul	Abandoned Hope
"U Know What it Is"	2012	Viktory	R4 (Relentless4ever)
"Drink from His Cup"	2012	Rich Rhymes, Suzy Rock	Determination
"Hangover"	2012	Chris Cobbins	Better: The Fan Appreciation Album
"Can't Fake It"	2012	Alex Faith, Dre Murray	Honest 2 God
"Power Trip"	2012	Lecrae, Sho Baraka, Andy Mineo	Gravity
"Son Hit Me"	2013	Json, Bizzle	Braille
"One One Six"	2013	Black Knight	#ItsTheBlackKnight Beat Tape
"Royal Lies"	2013	KIDD, GemStones	Murder My Flesh
"Was it Worth it"	2013	Lecrae, Crystal Nicole	Church Clothes 2
"On Ten"	2014	Tedashii, Transparent	Below Paradise (Deluxe Edition)
"Maybe"	2019	Aaron Cole, Kaleb Mitchell	Not By Chance

== Music videos ==
=== As lead artist ===
Title	Year	Director
"Deeper than Rap" (featuring Conviction and Canon)	2009	
"Get It"	2011	
"In His Image" (featuring Andy Mineo)	2011	
"Get Up"	2012	Marco "Oracle" Villalobos
"I'm Focused"	2012	Marco "Oracle" Villalobos
"Higher"	2012	Marco "Oracle" Villalobos
"Gimmie"	2013	Steven C. Pitts
"Who You Know"	2014	Will Thomas
"Party People" (featuring Social Club)	2014	Will Thomas
"Free"	2016	Patrick Tohill
"You Know It"	2016	Will Thomas
"Until I'm Gone" (featuring BJ the Chicago Kid)	2016	Will Thomas
"Look At Me Now"	2016	Will Thomas
"Take Off" (featuring Ty Brasel, Canon & KB)	2017	Jacob Henley
"Astronaut" (featuring Deraj & Bryon Juane)	2017	Caleb Natale
"This Morning" (featuring Anesha Birchett)	2017	Tyler P Creative
"Change the World" (featuring Hollyn)	2017	Patrick Tohill
"It Is What It Is"	2018	Know Control Productions
"Of Course" (featuring Bryon Juane)	2018	
"Revolution"	2018	
"Decisions" (featuring Dre Murray, Chino Dollaz, Anesha Birchett)	2018	Emege Media
"It's Not a Game" (featuring Canon)	2018	

=== As featured artist ===
Title	Year	Director
"Need it Daily" (Tedashii featuring PRo)	2011	Kyle Dettman
"I Got It" (Blaze featuring PRo and Chris Lee Cobbins)	2012	BNB/Light Salt Film
"Take a Broken Heart" (V. Rose featuring Derek Minor)	2016	

=== With 116 Clique ===
	Year	Director
"Man Up Anthem"	2011	

=== With R.M.G. ===
	Year	Director
"Reppin' on Em"	2011	Marco Villalobos
