= RMG (band) =

Hip hop group

- Also known as: Reflection Music Group (RMG)
- Origin: United States
- Genres: Christian hip hop, urban contemporary gospel
- Years active: 2012–present
- Labels: Reflection Music Group
- Members: Canon; Deraj; Derek Minor; Tony Tillman; Byron Juane
- Past members: Chad Jones; B. Cooper
- Website: reflectionmusicgroup.com

RMG is an American Christian Hip Hop group signed to Reflection Music Group. The group actively consists of four rappers Derek Minor, Canon, Tony Tillman, Byron Juane, and Deraj In 2012, the group broke through on the Billboard charts with their album Welcome to the Family that was released on March 27, 2012.

== Background ==
The Christian hip hop group, R.M.G. started in 2012, and they are made up of six Christian hip hop artists, Derek Minor, Chad Jones, Canon, Tony Tillman, B. Cooper, Byron Juane and Deraj.

== History ==
R.M.G. released Welcome to the Family, with Reflection Music Group, on March 27, 2012, and the album charted on three Billboard charts.

== Members ==
- Canon
- Derek Minor
- Tony Tillman
- Byron Juane
- Deraj

== Former members ==
- B. Cooper
- Chad Jones

== Discography ==
=== Studio albums ===
List of studio albums, with selected chart positions
Title	Album details	Peak chart positions		
Title	Album details	US Chr	US Gos	US Heat
Welcome to the Family	Released: March 27, 2012; Label: Reflection; CD, digital download	32	14	32
