= Minorville (album) =

Studio album by Derek Minor
- Released: September 10, 2013
- Genre: Christian hip hop
- Label: Reflection; Reach
- Producer: Derek Minor; Dirty Rice; Joseph Prielozny; The Heat Academy; KG On The Track; G Roc for Beat Mekanicz; Mr. Inkredible; Supaman Beatz; Gawvi

Derek Minor chronology
PSA, Vol. 3: Who Is Derek Minor? (2012)	Minorville (2013)	Empire (2015)

Minorville is the fourth album by American Christian hip hop artist Derek Minor, released on September 10, 2013 through Reflection Music Group and Reach Records.

== Reception ==
=== Critical reception ===
Andy Kellman from AllMusic gave the album a 3.5 out of 5 calling it "his most sonically rich and lyrically creative work yet". Michael Weaver from Jesus Freak Hideout gave the album a 4 out of 5, he said the album was a "slight step below" Minor's previous album Dying to Live but gave some positive feedback about the album for its messages saying " the record contains some important messages that are definitely powerful in nature".

Professional ratings
Review scores
Source	Rating
Allmusic	3.5/5 stars
Jesus Freak Hideout	4/5 stars

=== Commercial performance ===
The album debuted at No. 40 on Billboard 200, No. 2 on Christian Albums and No. 6 on Rap Albums, with approximately 8,300 copies sold in its first week. The album has sold 19,000 copies in the US as of January 2015.

== Track listing ==
No.	Title	Writer(s)	Producer(s)	Length
1.	"Lost to Minorville"	Derek Johnson; Courtney Peebles; Chris Mackey; Joseph Prielozny	Derek Minor; Dirty Rice; Joseph Prilozny	1:48
2.	"IGWT" (featuring Thi'sl)	D. Johnson; Torrance Esmond; Charles Dunlap; Lincoln Morris	Derek Minor; The Heat Academy	3:45
3.	"Gimmie"	D. Johnson; C. Mackey; J. Prielozny	Derek Minor; Dirty Rice; Joseph Prielozny	3:58
4.	"We Gone Make It" (featuring Canton Jones)	D. Johnson; J. Prielozny; Krishon Gaines	Derek Minor; Joseph Prilozny; KG On The Track	3:55
5.	"Ready, Set, Go"	D. Johnson; C. Mackey; J. Prielozny	Derek Minor; Dirty Rice; Joseph Prielozny	3:32
6.	"Hot Air Balloon" (featuring Kiya Lacey)	D. Johnson; Thomas Johnson; C. Mackey; J. Prielozny	Derek Minor; Dirty Rice; Joseph Prielozny	3:24
7.	"We Are (Champions)" (featuring SPZRKT)	D. Johnson; Xavier Adams; George Ramirez	G Roc for Beat Mekanicz	3:43
8.	"Love You Better" (featuring JC)	D. Johnson; T. Esmond; Brian Tistog; Justin Norvell Crowder	Mr. Inkredible	3:38
9.	"Respect That" (featuring Deraj and RMG)	D. Johnson; Jared Wells; Toney Frazier; Chad Jones; Aaron McCain; J. Prielozny; Blair Atkinson	Derek Minor; Joseph Prielozny; Supaman Beatz	4:24
10.	"Making Me More" (featuring Mel Washington)	D. Johnson; Mel Washington	Derek Minor	4:03
11.	"Sweet Dreams"	D. Johnson; J. Prielozny	Derek Minor; Joseph Prielozny	3:49
12.	"Dear Mr. Christian," (featuring Dee-1 and Lecrae)	D. Johnson; David Augustine, Jr.; Lecrae Moore; T. Esmond; C. Dunlap; L. Morris	The Heat Academy	4:25
13.	"Heaven's Little Runaway"	D. Johnson; J. Prielozny	Derek Minor; Joseph Prielozny	1:23
14.	"Homecoming" (featuring Isaac Caree)	D. Johnson; C. Mackey; J. Prielozny	Derek Minor; Dirty Rice; Joseph Prielozny	4:33
15.	"Deaf [Bonus Track]"	D. Johnson; Gabriel Azucena	Gawvi	3:26
16.	"Level Up [Hidden Bonus Track]" (featuring Foure)	D. Johnson		3:20

Notes

- "Lost to Minorville" features uncredited vocals by J.R.
- "Gimmie" features uncredited vocals by Tasha
- "Sweet Dreams" features uncredited vocals by Kiya Lacey
- "Heaven's Little Runaway" features uncredited vocals by Danika Hawkins
