= Camden (album) =

Studio album by Tony Tillman
- Released: August 7, 2015
- Genre: Christian hip hop
- Length: 51:44
- Label: Reflection
- Producer: Cardec Drums, Derek Minor, Dirty Rice, G ROC, Gawvi, GeeDA, Chris King, Alex Medina, Tone Jonez

Camden is the second studio album from Tony Tillman. Reflection Music Group released the album on August 7, 2015. He worked with Cardec Drums, Derek Minor, Dirty Rice, G ROC, Gawvi, GeeDA, Chris King, Alex Medina, and Tone Jonez, in the production of this album.

== Critical reception ==
Professional ratings
Review scores
Source	Rating
The Christian Manifesto	5/5 stars
Cross Rhythms	7/10 squares
New Release Today	3.5/5 stars

Awarding the album three and a half stars at New Release Today, Dwayne Lacy states, "There's nothing like real life music." Cal Moore, giving the album five stars from The Christian Manifesto, writes, "This is the kind of music that hip-hop heads can’t help but respect."

== Track listing ==
No.	Title	Writer(s)	Producer(s)	Length
1.	"870"	Toney Frazier, Derek Johnson, Jr.	Derek Minor	2:29
2.	"About Me"	T. Frazier, D. Johnson	Derek Minor	3:39
3.	"No Lie" (featuring Derek Minor)	T. Frazier, D. Johnson, George Ramirez	G ROC	3:26
4.	"Adams Avenue"	T. Frazier, Jacob Cardec, Xavier Adams	Cardec Drums	3:44
5.	"Cmdn" (featuring Deraj, Tragic Hero, Drew Allen)	T. Frazier, Jared Wells, Mario Torres, Drew Allen, J. Cardec	Cardec Drums	4:00
6.	"Inspiration" (featuring Truth Chiles)	T. Frazier, Johnnie Winters, Charles Cornelius	GeeDA	3:49
7.	"Lord Have Mercy" (featuring Derek Minor, B. Cooper)	T. Frazier, D. Johnson, Brad Cooper	Derek Minor	4:13
8.	"Role Model" (featuring Camille Faulkner)	T. Frazier, J. Cardec	Cardec Drums	4:01
9.	"Shadows" (featuring Sye Spence)	T. Frazier, Sye Elaine Spence, Alex Medina, Gabriel Azucena	Alex Medina, Gawvi	3:42
10.	"Without You" (featuring Chad Jones, Canon, JC)	T. Frazier, Chad Jones, Aaron McCain, Johnnie Winters, G. Ramirez, Wesley Smith	G ROC, Canon	4:45
11.	"Ghost"	T. Frazier, Terrance A. Jones, Kenneth Chris Mackey	Tone Jonez, Dirty Rice	6:30
12.	"Make It Out" (T. Frazier, D. Johnson, J. Cardec)		Cardec Drums	3:17
13.	"Praying for You" (featuring J. Prince)	T. Frazier, Joel Prince, Chris Owens	Chris King	4:09
Total length:				51:44

== Chart performance ==
Chart (2015)	Peak position
US Christian Albums (Billboard)	25
US Heatseekers Albums (Billboard)	19
