= Empire (Derek Minor album) =

Studio album by Derek Minor
- Released: January 27, 2015
- Recorded: 2014
- Genre: Christian hip hop
- Length: 58:16
- Label: Reflection; eOne
- Producer: Derek Minor; Dirty Rice; Black Knight Creationz; Jonny Grande; Anthony AntMan Wonder Reid; Tyshane; Bandplay; G Roc for Beat Mechanicz; Gawvi; Syksense

Derek Minor chronology
Minorville (2013)	Empire (2015)	1014 (2016)

Empire is the fifth studio album by American Christian hip hop artist Derek Minor, released on January 27, 2015. It was released through Reflection Music Group and Entertainment One.

== Concept ==
Derek Minor explained that the concept of the album addresses how people build their own empires vs. the empire of God.

== Critical reception ==
Professional ratings
Review scores
Source	Rating
Allmusic	3.5/5 stars
CCM Magazine	3/5 stars
Cross Rhythms	9/10 squares
HipHopDX	3.5/5 stars
Indie Vision Music	4/5 stars
Jesus Freak Hideout	4.5/5 stars
New Release Tuesday	4.5/5 stars

Kevin Hoskins from Jesus Freak Hideout gave the album a 4.5 out of 5, saying "the beats are amazing, the rapping flows wonderfully, and there's an abundance of great guest spots. All rap fans need to grab this album as it has the potential to be the best hip hop album in what is gearing up to be a great year for hip hop music." Ronald Grant of HipHopDX rated the album a 3.5 out of 5, describing it as a "bold body of with Derek Minor applying message to a form that can appear nihilistic." Mark Ryan awarded the album 4.5 out of 5, claiming it is a "truly provoking and, as has become expected, the quality is top notch." Anthony Peronto from Indie Vision Music assigned the album a 4 out of 5, declaring it as "a powerful statement on kingdom-building and has raised the bar for what could be a fantastic year for music." Grace S. Aspinwall from CCM Magazine gave the album 3 out of 5, writing "Overall, Empire is a promising preview-with his superior songwriting and performance, we expect to hear much more from Derek Minor in the years to come." Thom Jurek from AllMusic gave the album a 3.5 out of 5 also saying "Empire is massive: it's creative, expansive, and expertly sequenced. No matter what your spiritual predilection, there is much to enjoy here. Minor is not only a great rapper, but an excellent conceptual thinker. This is CCHH at its best." Steve Hayes from Cross Rhythms gave the album a 9 out of ten describing, "'Empire' is a search for meaning and grace amid the false gods and temptations of a fallen world."

== Commercial performance ==
The album debuted at number 54 on the Billboard 200 with first week sales of approximately 11,000 copies.

== Track listing ==
No.	Title	Writer(s)	Producer(s)	Length
1.	"Intro"	Derek Johnson; Chris Mackey	Derek Minor; Dirty Rice	2:12
2.	"All Hail the King" (featuring Deraj & nobigdyl)	D. Johnson; Jared Wells; Dylan Phillips	Derek Minor	3:42
3.	"Empire" (featuring Traneisha "Truth" Chiles)	D. Johnson; Traneisha Chiles; Brandon Peavy	Derek Minor; Black Knight Creationz	3:11
4.	"Who You Know"	D. Johnson; C. Mackey	Dirty Rice	4:14
5.	"Babel 1"	D. Johnson; Rachel Kate; Jon Hicks; Mel Washington	Jonny Grande	3:05
6.	"Kingdom Come"	D. Johnson; Brad Cooper; Anthony Markeith Reid	Anthony AntMan Wonder Reid	3:27
7.	"Slow Down" (featuring Tony Tillman & Tedashii)	D. Johnson; Tony Frazier; Tedashii Anderson, C. Mackey; Tyshane Thompson	Dirty Rice; Tyshane	3:49
8.	"Stranger"	D. Johnson; Roslyn Welch; C. Mackey	Dirty Rice; Derek Minor	4:45
9.	"Last Forever" (featuring B. Cooper & Leah Smith)	D. Johnson; B. Cooper; Krishon Gaines; C. Mackey	Dirty Rice; Derek Minor; Bandplay	3:48
10.	"Save Me" (featuring J. Paul)	D. Johnson; George Ramirez	G Roc for Beat Mechanicz	3:45
11.	"Babel 2"	D. Johnson; C. Mackey; R. Welch	Dirty Rice; Derek Minor	1:57
12.	"Fly" (featuring Colton Dixon)	D. Johnson; Colton Dixon; J. Hicks	Jonny Grande	3:42
13.	"Oceans" (featuring Move Aside)	D. Johnson; J. Hicks; Justin Paul	Jonny Grande	3:35
14.	"Right By My Side" (featuring Chad Jones & Anthony Evans Jr.)	D. Johnson; Chad Jones; Gabriel Azucena	Gawvi	3:47
15.	"Party People" (featuring Social Club)	D. Johnson; Martin Santiago; Fernando Miranda; Justin Scruggs	Syksense; Derek Minor; Jonny Grande	3:58
16.	"Until the End of Time" (featuring Lecrae & Canon)	D. Johnson; Lecrae Moore; Aaron McCain; C. Mackey	Dirty Rice; Derek Minor	5:19

Notes

- "Intro" features uncredited vocals by Danika Hawkins
- "Babel 1" features uncredited vocals by Rachel Kate
- "Kingdom Come" and "Part People" feature uncredited vocals by Camille Faulkner
- "Stranger" features uncredited vocals by Roz & Camille Faulkner
- "Babel 2" features uncredited vocals by Roz
- "Fly" features uncredited vocals by Mel Washington
- "Oceans" features uncredited vocals by Greag Breal & Stephanie Lauren
- "Right By My Side" features uncredited vocals by J. Paul
