= City Lights (disambiguation) =

City Lights is a 1931 film starring Charlie Chaplin.

City Lights may also refer to:

== Music ==
- City Lights (band), an easycore band from Columbus, Ohio

=== Albums ===
- City Lights (Dr. John album), 1978
- City Lights (Jimmy McGriff album), 1981
- City Lights (Json album), 2010
- City Lights (Lee Morgan album), 1957
- City Lights (Lou Reed album), 1985
- City Lights (EP), by Baekhyun, 2019
- City Lights (The Waeve album), 2024
- City Lights, by Mickey Gilley, 1975
- City Lights: Country Favorites, by Connie Smith, 1972

=== Songs ===
- "City Lights" (Blanche song), 2017
- "City Lights" (Ray Price song), 1958
- "City Lights" (Tim McGraw song), 2014
- "City Lights", from the musical The Act, 1977
- "City Lights", by Avicii from Stories, 2015
- "City Lights", by Bridgit Mendler, 2012
- "City Lights", by David Essex, 1976
- "City Lights", by JoJo from JoJo, 2004
- "City Lights", by Method Man, 2009
- "City Lights", by Motionless in White from Creatures, 2010
- "City Lights", by The White Stripes from the Jack White compilation Acoustic Recordings 1998–2016, 2016
- "City Lights", by William Pitt, 1986

== Film and television ==
- City Lights (1973 TV series), a Canadian celebrity interview series
- City Lights (1984 TV series), a Scottish sitcom made by BBC Scotland
- City Lights (2007 TV series), a 2007 British comedy-drama, the sequel to Northern Lights
- CityLights (2014 film), a Hindi-language film directed by Hansal Mehta

== Other fields ==
- Citylights (building), Queens, New York
- City Lights Bookstore, independent bookstore and small press publisher
- Seattle City Light, the public utility in the Seattle metropolitan area
- Front position lamps, also called city lights

== See also ==
- City of Light (disambiguation)
- Lichter der Stadt, a 2012 album by Unheilig
- Street light
