= Braille (album) =

Studio album by Json
- Released: June 18, 2013
- Genre: Christian hip hop
- Length: 45:40
- Label: Lamp Mode
- Producer: Banger Boys, Black Knight, D-Flow, G-Roc, J.R., Mashell Leroy, Derek Minor, Spec

Json chronology
| Growing Pains (2012) | Braille (2013) | No Filter (2015) |

Braille is the fifth album from Json. Lamp Mode Recordings released the project on June 18, 2013.

== Reception ==
Professional ratings
Review scores
| Source | Rating |
|---|---|
| The Christian Manifesto | 3.5/5 stars |
| Cross Rhythms | 9/10 squares |
| Jam the Hype | 9.6/10 |
| New Release Tuesday | 4.5/5 stars |

Specifying in a four and a half star review by New Release Tuesday, Mark Ryan realizes, "Json, along with Spec have created a near perfect album." Mark Sherwood, indicating for Cross Rhythms in a nine out of ten review, replies, "the Iowa-based rapper delivers another powerful set." Signaling in a three and a half star review by The Christian Manifesto, Calvin Moore recognizes, "Braille is a return to form for him." In a 9.6 out of ten review by Justin Morden from Jam the Hype, responds, "With Braille, Json has released one of the best Christian Hip-Hop albums of the year."

== Track listing ==
| No. | Title | Producer(s) | Length |
|---|---|---|---|
| 1. | "Braille" (featuring Lori) | Spec | 1:43 |
| 2. | "Passing" (featuring KB and Serge) | Mashell Leroy | 4:40 |
| 3. | "Work" (featuring Spec) | Derek Minor | 3:23 |
| 4. | "Play My Song" (featuring Flame) | J.R. | 3:54 |
| 5. | "Can't Let Go" (featuring B. Reith, S.O.) | G-Roc | 4:22 |
| 6. | "Benjamin Button" | D-Flow | 4:17 |
| 7. | "Intoxicated" (featuring Lori) | Spec | 3:37 |
| 8. | "Stars" (featuring Demond) | Mashell Leroy | 4:16 |
| 9. | "Son Hit Me" (featuring Bizzle and Derek Minor) | Banger Boys | 3:52 |
| 10. | "Hold Nothing Back" (featuring Benjah) | Black Knight | 4:25 |
| 11. | "Secrets Interlude" | | 0:30 |
| 12. | "Secrets (Part 2)" (featuring J.R.) | J.R. | 3:43 |
| 13. | "Trust You" (featuring Julianna Zobrist) | Spec | 2:58 |
| Total length: | | | 45:40 |

== Charts ==
| Chart (2013) | Peak position |
|---|---|
| US Christian Albums (Billboard) | 11 |
| US Top Gospel Albums (Billboard) | 5 |
| US Independent Albums (Billboard) | 47 |
| US Top Rap Albums (Billboard) | 23 |
