= Braille (disambiguation) =

Braille is a system of writing for blind people.

== Braille as a System ==
- Braille_Patterns, the Unicode block containing the braille characters
- English Braille, a braille alphabet for the English language
- Nemeth Braille, a braille alphabet for mathematical and scientific notations and writing
- French Braille, a braille alphabet for the French language
- Spanish Braille, a braille alphabet for Spanish language
- Gardner–Salinas braille codes, a braille alphabet for mathematical and scientific notations and writing, designed as an alternative to Nemeth Braille
- American Braille, a now defunct braille alphabet for the English language

== Other ==
Braille may also refer to:

- Louis Braille, the Frenchman who devised the writing system
- 9969 Braille, an asteroid named for Louis Braille
- Braille (musician) (born 1981), American hip-hop artist
- Braille (album)

== See also ==
- Braille Patterns, a Unicode block
- Braille Scale, another name for 1/72 or 1/76 in modeling
- Brail
