= Brent Kolatalo =

American musical artist & producer

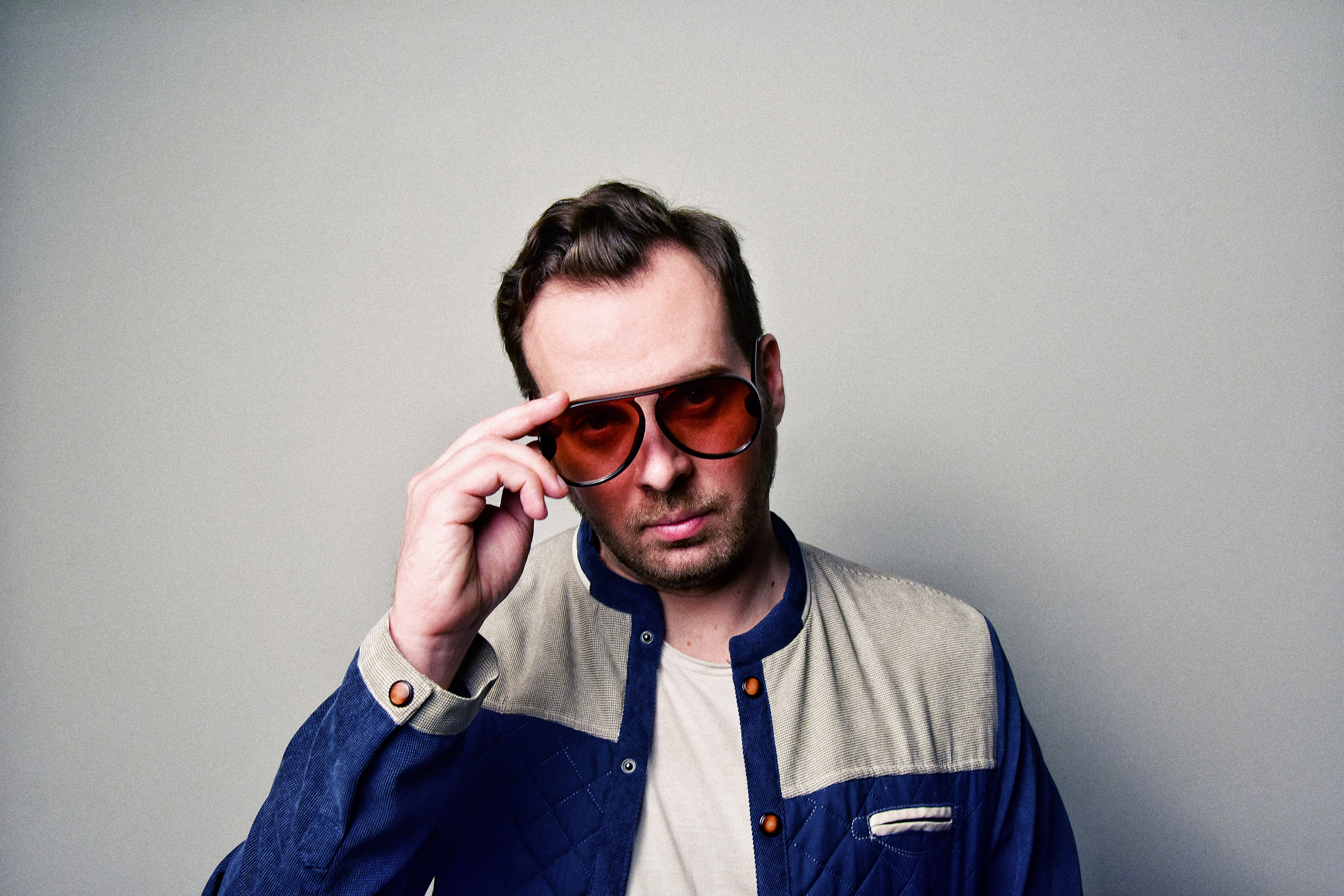

Background information
- Origin: Cincinnati, Ohio, United States
- Genres: Hip hop; R&B; rock; pop
- Occupations: Producer; mixer; Songwriter; Audio Engineer
- Years active: 2003–present
- Website: brentk.com

Brent Kolatalo is an American mixer, record producer, engineer and songwriter based in New York City. Kolatalo has worked with numerous artists and musicians, including Kanye West, Jay-Z, Eminem, Drake, Bruno Mars, X Ambassadors, Future, Chris Webby, Ella Henderson, Taylor Swift, Lorde, OneRepublic, Lady Gaga and Lana Del Rey among others.

He has worked on several albums such as, To Pimp a Butterfly, Uptown Special, If You're Reading This it's too Late, Based On a T.R.U. Story, My Beautiful Dark Twisted Fantasy, Watch the Throne, Just Charlie, Late Registration and The College Dropout among others.

== Life and career ==
Kolatalo was born in Barberton and grew up in Cincinnati, Ohio. He began practicing guitar when he was a kid, one of his tutors was Jeff Martin.

He attended Lakota West High School in West Chester, Ohio and graduated in 2000. In 2002, he went to Berklee College of Music in Boston, during summers he was a trainee at Avatar Studios. Kolatalo dropped out in 2004 after working on Kanye West debut studio album, The College Dropout which earning several nominations at the 47th Grammy Awards.

In 2007, Kolatalo started The Skywalkers, a production team with his partner Ken Lewis which was renamed to Katalyst in 2011.

Kolatalo's songwriting credits include "The Blacker the Berry", Kendrick Lamar's track, which appeared on his album To Pimp a Butterfly (2015). He is the engineer on multi-platinum Mark Ronson's single featuring Bruno Mars, "Uptown Funk". In 2016, Kolatalo recorded and played on the track "Come to Mama" from Lady Gaga's album, Joanne. In 2019, he worked on Taylor Swift's album, Lover.

== Awards and recognition ==
He is a three-time Grammy nominee by name and has worked on over sixteen Grammy nominated albums. He was nominated for his work as audio and mixer engineer on Kendrick Lamar's To Pimp a Butterfly (2015), Eminem's Eminem (Recovery) (2010) and Kanye West's The College Dropout (2004).

=== Grammy awards ===
Year	Artist	Album or Song	Category	Result
2015	Kendrick Lamar	To Pimp a Butterfly - The Blacker the Berry	Best Rap Album	Nominated
2010	Eminem	Recovery - Session One	Best Rap Album	Nominated
2004	Kanye West	The College Dropout - All Falls Down, Heavy Hitters, Last Call, Family Business	Best Rap Album	Nominated

== Discography ==
- 2020: Ella Henderson, Take Care of You — Producer
- 2020: Eminem, Music to Be Murdered By: Side B — Recording
- 2019: Rick Ross, Port of Miami 2 — Bass, Composer, Drums, Keyboards
- 2019: Taylor Swift, Lover — Engineer
- 2018: Des Rocs, Let The Vultures In — Producer, Mixing
- 2017: Belly, Mumble Rap — Composer
- 2017: The Marias, Superclean Vol. I. — Mixing
- 2017: K. Michelle, Kimberly: People I Used to Know — Composer
- 2017:The Score, ATLAS — Composer
- 2017: Lorde, Melodrama — Drum Programming
- 2016: One Republic, Oh My My — Additional Production, Drums, Keys, Guitars
- 2016: V. Rose, Young Dangerous Heart — Mixing
- 2016: The Score, Unstoppable — Composer
- 2016: Farid Bang, Blut — Mixing
- 2016: Lady Gaga, Joanne — Drums, Engineer
- 2015: Kendrick Lamar, To Pimp a Butterfly — Composer
- 2015: X Ambassadors, VHS (Deluxe) — Producer
- 2015: Drake, If You're Reading This it's too Late — Composer
- 2015: Gallant, Red Bull Single for "Borderline" — Mixing
- 2015: Jamie Foxx, Hollywood: A Story of a Dozen Roses — Composer
- 2014: Future, Honest — Producer
- 2014: Chris Webby, Chemically Imbalanced — Additional Production, Mixing
- 2014: TyDi, Redefined — Mixing
- 2014: Niykee Heaton, Bad Intentions — Sample Recreation
- 2013: Kanye West, Yeezus — Engineer
- 2013: Eminem, The Marshall Mathers LP 2 — Digital Editing
- 2013: Pusha T, My Name Is My Name — Composer
- 2013: Jay-Z, Magna Carta... Holy Grail — Sampling
- 2013: John Legend, Love in the Future — Engineer
- 2013: Big Sean, Hall of Fame — Musician
- 2013: J. Cole, Born Sinner — Engineer
- 2012: Timeflies, One Night Ep — Mixing
- 2012: Bruno Mars, Unorthodox Jukebox — Drum Engineering
- 2012: Lana Del Rey, Born to Die — Drums, Engineer
- 2012: 2 Chainz, Based on a T.R.U. Story — Bass Programming, Drum Programming
- 2011:Jay-Z / Kanye West, Watch the Throne — Bass, Engineer, Guitar, Keyboards
- 2011: Drake, Take Care — Engineer, Instrumentation
- 2011: Maybach Music Group Presents: Self Made, Vol. 1 — Keyboards
- 2010: The Knocks, Magic — Mixing
- 2010: Rick Ross, Teflon Don — Instrumentation
- 2010: Charlie Wilson, Just Charlie — Musician Engineer
- 2010: Eminem, Recovery — Musician, Engineer
- 2010: Kanye West, My Beautiful Dark Twisted Fantasy — Drum Programming, Engineer, Keyboards
- 2010: Kid Cudi, Man on the Moon II: The Legend of Mr. Rager — Engineer
- 2010: Rain, Back to The Basic — Mixing
- 2009: Mario, D.N.A. — Drum Programming
- 2009: SS501, Rebirth — Mixing
- 2008: Miggs, Unraveled — Mixing
- 2008: Cristian Alexanda, Too Fine — Mixing
- 2008: Balance, Golden State Warriorz Comp, Vol. 1 — Mixing
- 2008: Kanye West, 808's & Heartbreak — Musician
- 2008: San Quinn, From a Boy to a Man — Mixing
- 2007: E.P., Supastar — Mixing
- 2007: Skidmore Fountain, Break — Mixing
- 2006: Skidmore Fountain, Skidmore Fountain — Mixing
- 2006: D&A, Love Goes — Mixing
- 2006: Ghostface Killah, Fishscale — Musician
- 2005: Cuban Link, Chain Reaction — Engineer
- 2005: Common, Be — Musician
- 2005 : Memphis Bleek, 543 — Musician
- 2005: Cassidy, I'm a Hustla — Sample Recreation
- 2004: Jin, The Rest Is History —Engineer, Musician
- 2004: Kanye West, The College Dropout — Engineer
- 2004: Man on Earth, Disposable Sounds for the Fickle Mind — Engineer
- 2004: Jadakiss, Kiss of Death — Musician
