= Brad Cooper =

Brad Cooper may refer to:

- Brad Cooper (swimmer) (born 1954), Australian swimmer
- Brad Cooper (born 1959), Australian businessman who played a central role in the collapse of HIH Insurance
- Brad Cooper (admiral) (born 1967), United States Navy officer
- B. Cooper (Brad Alan Cooper, born 1984), American rapper
- Brad Cooper (General Hospital), a fictional character that has appeared in the TV series since 2013

== See also ==
- Bradley Cooper (born 1975), American actor and filmmaker
- Bradley Cooper (athlete) (born 1957), Bahamanian discus thrower and shot putter
