= Young Dangerous Heart =

Young Dangerous Heart may refer to:

- Young Dangerous Heart (Subtitle album), 2005 album by American rapper Subtitle
- Young Dangerous Heart (V. Rose album), 2016 album by American Christian singer V. Rose
