= Hearts Up EP =

Extended play by V. Rose

EP by V. Rose
- Released: October 30, 2015
- Genres: Christian pop; CEDM; Christian rock; Christian hip hop; bubblegum pop; pop rock
- Length: 15:07
- Label: Inpop
- Producers: Broken City; Spec

V. Rose chronology
Forever After (2014)	Hearts Up EP (2015)	Young Dangerous Heart (2016)

Singles from Hearts Up
- 1. "Take A Broken Heart (feat. Derek Minor)" Released: 2015; 2. "Love Shaped Heart" Released: 2015

Hearts Up EP is the first extended play from V. Rose. Inpop Records released the EP on October 30, 2015. It is her first release with the label. She worked with Broken City and Spec, in the production of this album.

== Critical reception ==
Professional ratings
Review scores
Source	Rating
365 Days of Inspiring Media	4/5 stars
Cross Rhythms	6/10 squares
Jesus Freak Hideout	3/5 stars
New Release Today	3/5 stars

Awarding the EP three stars from New Release Today, Amanda Brogan-DeWilde states, "V.Rose's music is peppy and fun, served up with giggles and cheesiness. This EP is another offering perfect for tween girls or really anyone who likes poppy, positive music." Joshua Andre, giving the EP four stars at 365 Days of Inspiring Media, writes, "this EP on Inpop Records has proven quite the contrary, with the style almost being identical to previous records, which is a nice familiarity as V. Rose continues to bring her vibrant and unique brand of music to the world...Look out world, V is coming, taking it all by storm- these 15 minutes or so of pure pop CCM goodness is proof that she will be a star now and in the many years to come!" Rating the EP three stars at Jesus Freak Hideout, Sarah Berdon says, "Hearts Up, finds the artist continuing to refine her brand of bubblegum pop music." Stephen Luff, indicating in a six out of ten review by Cross Rhythms, describes, "With the right song, this label move could be good for the young lady, but the songs will need to be more memorable than those presented here."

== Track listing ==
No.	Title	Writer(s)	Length
1.	"Fairy Tale Ending"	Lamontt "Spec" Backshire; Tony Esterly; Vienna Dare	3:50
2.	"Love Shaped Heart"	Gannin Arnold; Dare; Adam Watts	3:10
3.	"Take a Broken Heart" (featuring Derek Minor)	Backshire; Dare	4:43
4.	"Bottom to the Top"	Backshire; Dare	3:23
Total length:			15:07

Notes

- Writing credits can be obtained from AllMusic.
