= Forever After (disambiguation) =

Forever After is a 2014 album by V. Rose.

Forever After may also refer to:

- Forever After (film), a 1926 American silent drama film
- Forever After, a novel by Catherine Anderson 1998

== Music ==
- Forever After, a 1995 album by Koxbox
- Forever After, a 2010 album by Astral
- "Forever After", a single by Paradise Lost from the 2005 album Paradise Lost
- "Forever After", a 1987 single by Madonna Tassi
- "Forever After", song by Savatage from the 1993 album Edge of Thorns
- "Forever After", song by Delerium from the 2003 album Chimera
- "Forever After", song by Angels of Venice from the 2001 album Music for Harp

== See also ==
- "Forever After All", a 2020 song by Luke Combs
- Shrek Forever After, a 2010 American film
