= Reflection (Derek Minor album) =

Studio album by Derek Minor
- Released: October 14, 2016
- Recorded: 2016
- Genre: Christian hip hop
- Label: Reflection; eOne

Derek Minor chronology
1014 (2016)	Reflection (2016)

Reflection is the sixth studio album by American Christian hip hop artist Derek Minor, released on October 14, 2016. It was released through Reflection Music Group and Entertainment One.

== Album concept ==
Derek Minor explained that the concept of the album addresses identity crisis in the United States, in an interview with Rapzilla, Derek Minor said "I feel like many of the issues that we face are based on identity issues. People, they don’t value themselves, they don’t value others, they don’t value family... Everyone has an identity crisis, and I wanted to contribute to that conversation with the record to say, ‘Nah, you were made for greatness. You weren’t made for no reason. You aren’t an accident. You weren’t just an afterthought by God. He made you, crafted you with an amazing purpose,’ and that’s the whole idea of the album — reflect God, reflect greatness".

== Reception ==
=== Commercial performance ===
The album debuted at number 114 on the Billboard 200, number 7 on the Billboard Christian Albums chart, number 5 on the Rap Albums chart, and number 15 on the Independent Albums chart.

=== Critical reception ===
Professional ratings
Review scores
Source	Rating
Jesus Freak Hideout	4/5 stars

Kevin Hoskins from Jesus Freak Hideout gave the album a 4 out of 5, saying "this is a very solid album that should be owned by all rap fans. It may not be as great as Dying to Live or Empire, but Reflection is still an excellent album. The focus and thought process is delivered in such a straightforward manner that Minor's point can't be missed."

== Track listing ==
- Total length: 54:16
1. "Look At Me Now"
2. "Hold Up"
3. "You Know It"
4. "Until I'm Gone" (featuring BJ the Chicago Kid)
5. "Things Fall Apart"
6. "Believe It"
7. "I'm Good" (featuring Janice Gaines)
8. "Judo"
9. "Love Go High" (featuring Chrisette Michele)
10. "Change the World" (featuring Hollyn)
11. "Live"
12. "Good Enough" (featuring Camille Faulkner)
13. "Real Ones"
14. "Greatness 2.0"

Pre-ordering the album came with 1014 EP:

- Total Length: 69:52
1. "Greatness"
2. "Hand on the Bible"
3. "Touchdown" (featuring Canon)
4. "Drowning" (featuring V. Rose)
