= Chad Jones (disambiguation) =

Chad Jones (born 1984) is an Australian footballer.

Chad Jones can also refer to:

- Charles I. Jones, American economist who developed the Jones model
- Chad Jones (American football) (born 1988), American football player
- Chad Jones (rapper) (born 1984), American rapper
- Chandler Holder Jones (born 1971), American Anglican bishop
