= No Filter (Json album) =

Studio album by Json
- Released: March 10, 2015
- Genre: Christian hip hop
- Length: 62:16
- Label: Lamp Mode
- Producer: D-Flow, G-Roc, Geeda, J.R., Mashell Leroy

Json chronology
Braille (2013)	No Filter (2015)

No Filter is the sixth album from Json, released on March 10, 2015, through Lamp Mode Recordings. Json worked with producers D-Flow, G-Roc, Geeda, J.R., and Mashell Leroy.

== Background ==
This album is the sixth for Jsons' career, and it comes after Braille that was released in 2013. The album is produced by D-Flow, G-Roc, Geeda, J.R., and Mashell Leroy.

== Reception ==
Professional ratings
Review scores
Source	Rating
New Release Tuesday	4.5/5 stars
Z180 Radio	4.65/5 stars

Signaling in a four and a half star review by New Release Tuesday, Mark Ryan recognizes, "the album is powerful." E. Pluribus Unum, indicating for Z180 Radio in a 4.65 out of five star review, realizes, with respect to this release "This praise is earned." Specifying for Wade-O Radio, Mikaela responds, "No Filter is another solid album from the St. Louis native, who used a concept to not only highlight the struggles we constantly face, but he presents a solution to it all."

== Track listing ==
No.	Title	Length
1.	"The Birth (Prelude)"	0:47
2.	"The Birth"	1:34
3.	"Preacha Man" (featuring Monty G)	3:57
4.	"Got It Got It" (featuring S.O.)	3:27
5.	"Light Up" (featuring Serge)	3:49
6.	"Identity" (featuring Jai)	4:06
7.	"Remember" (featuring J.R.)	4:12
8.	"My G" (featuring Black Knight)	3:59
9.	"Stunna (Prelude)"	0:29
10.	"Stunna" (featuring Tony)	4:29
11.	"Love To Do It" (featuring Keno Camp & J. Carter)	4:05
12.	"Black" (featuring T Word)	4:12
13.	"Like That"	3:07
14.	"Winters Bone" (featuring J.R.)	4:15
15.	"Filters Effect" (featuring Charde Jones)	4:14
16.	"Stronger" (featuring HillaryJane)	3:38
17.	"Secrets (Bonus Track)" (featuring J.R.)	4:13
18.	"Secrets Pt. 2 (Bonus Track)" (featuring J.R.)	3:43
Total length:		62:16

== Charts ==
Chart (2015)	Peak position
US Christian Albums (Billboard)	17
US Independent Albums (Billboard)	29
US Top Rap Albums (Billboard)	24
