= So It Continues =

Studio album by S.O.
- Released: November 13, 2012
- Genre: Christian hip hop
- Length: 62:18
- Label: Lamp Mode

S.O. chronology
So It Begins (2011)	So It Continues (2012)	So It Ends (2015)

So It Continues is the second album by S.O. released on November 13, 2012, on Lamp Mode Recordings.

== Reception ==
Professional ratings
Review scores
Source	Rating
Cross Rhythms	10/10 squares
Jam the Hype	4/5 stars
New Release Tuesday	3.5/5 stars

Specifying in a three and a half star out of five review by New Release Tuesday, Mark Ryan realizes, "With the exception of a couple musical miscues in outros, and one song that didn’t really fit in, this album was well done from beginning to end." In a ten out of ten review by Steve Hayes from Cross Rhythms, recognizes, "Drink deeply, reflect on and allow this to sink deep into your heart." K Hill, indicating in a four star out of five review for Jam the Hype, responds, "It truly is a project that has more in mind than simply pulling heart strings, the aim is undoubtedly to tune them to the key of The King."

== Track listing ==
No.	Title	Length
1.	"So It Continues"	4:09
2.	"Lamentations" (featuring Leah Smith)	4:41
3.	"I Can Bear"	3:35
4.	"Away Soon" (featuring Sean C. Johnson)	3:52
5.	"Memoirs (Wish You Were Around)"	5:29
6.	"Radical" (featuring J. Williams and Lecrae)	3:12
7.	"I Am" (featuring Shai Linne)	4:25
8.	"Walk in the Sun II"	2:52
9.	"Tell Em All" (featuring Andy Mineo)	3:09
10.	"You Know It" (featuring E. Tizz)	5:41
11.	"Elisabeth's Interlude"	3:53
12.	"Yesterday"	5:41
13.	"Passion and Purity"	6:10
14.	"The End?"	5:29
Total length:		62:18

== Charts ==
Chart (2012)	Peak position
US Top Gospel Albums (Billboard)	36
US Top Rap Albums (Billboard)	24
