= City Lights (Json album) =

Studio album by Json
- Released: July 20, 2010
- Genre: Christian hip hop
- Length: 58:58
- Label: Lamp Mode

Json chronology
Life on Life (2008)	City Lights (2010)	Growing Pains (2012)

City Lights is the third album from Json. Lamp Mode Recordings released the project on July 20, 2010.

== Reception ==
Professional ratings
Review scores
Source	Rating
Indie Vision Music	4/5 stars
Rapzilla	3.5/5

Specifying in a three and a half out of five review by Rapzilla, they recognizes, "Although 'City Lights' is not without its missteps (an unneeded feature here, a forgettable song there) these are hard to harp on considering the depth of this project. With this album, Json not only shows his capacity for being a consistently innovative artist, he sends out an S.O.S. on behalf of communities drowning in sin and calling for the Lifesaver." Josh Burkey, indicating in a four star out of five review for Indie Vision Music, responds, "Json's album 'City Lights' has a genuine message broadcasting throughout with a bang from start to finish."

== Track listing ==
No.	Title	Length
1.	"Intro"	1:02
2.	"City Lights" (featuring Trubble)	3:56
3.	"Hustle City" (featuring Boxx)	5:16
4.	"Snapshot (Interlude)"	0:58
5.	"Peep Hole"	3:46
6.	"Goon" (featuring Ad3 and Thi'sl)	4:13
7.	"Parent Me" (featuring J.R.)	4:32
8.	"What I Am" (featuring R-Swift)	3:56
9.	"Hope U See"	4:15
10.	"Love Like This" (featuring Jay and Thi'sl)	4:15
11.	"Unexpected Happenings"	4:29
12.	"I Am a City Light (Interlude)"	0:57
13.	"Crank It Up" (featuring Pro)	4:14
14.	"Pray for My City" (featuring Flame, Future, Mike Real, Rio and Saved)	5:02
15.	"Bout to Go"	4:15
16.	"Heaven's Runway" (featuring Fitzgerald)	3:52
Total length:		58:58

== Charts ==
Chart (2010)	Peak position
US Christian Albums (Billboard)	46
US Top Gospel Albums (Billboard)	11
