= Jai (rapper) =

- Born: Jaime La'Treecia Vaughn; November 5, 1981 (age 44); St. Louis, Missouri, U.S.
- Origin: St. Louis, Missouri
- Genres: Christian hip hop, Christian R&B, urban contemporary gospel, contemporary R&B
- Occupations: Singer, songwriter
- Instruments: vocals, singer-songwriter
- Years active: 2009–present
- Label: Outlet
- Website: justjai.com/me/

Jaime La'Treecia Williams (born November 5, 1981; née, Vaughn), who goes by the stage name Jai (pronounced, Jay), is an American Christian R&B, and urban contemporary gospel artist and musician. She started her music career, in 2009, with the release of Focus EP. She saw her first studio album, Culture Shock, chart on two Billboard charts Christian Albums and the Top Gospel Albums. The album was released in 2011 with Outlet Records Music Group and Central South Infinity Distribution.

== Early life ==
Jai was born in St. Louis, Missouri, on November 5, 1981, as Jaime La'Treecia Vaughn. Her father is Jimmy L. Vaughn, Sr. of Perpetual Praise and Worship Ministries and her mother, Melinda Vaughn. She has one brother Jimmy L. Vaughn, Jr. and one sister, Nikki.

== Music career ==
Her music career started in 2009, with the independently released extended play, Focus. The first studio album from Jai, Culture Shock, released on August 2, 2011 by Outlet Records Music Group, and this was her debut album on the Billboard charts, and those were the Christian Albums chart at No. 45 and the Top Gospel Albums chart at Mo. 25. This album received a three and a half out of five review from Rapzilla, and it was called a "groundbreaking album" by Jonathan Kemp at The Christian Music Review Blog review. AllHipHop called her one of Five Christian Hip-Hop Acts You Should Know alongside Tedashii, Lecrae, Da' T.R.U.T.H. and Flame. She is a featured artist on the song "Identity" that's on No Filter by Json.

== Personal life ==
She resides in St. Louis, Missouri, and mother of, Taylor Alyssa Williams. Jai is currently on staff as Worship Pastor at Faith Church and is a host for Joyce Meyer Ministries conferences. She is an ordained minister, and a 2003 graduate of Webster University, receiving her Bachelor's degree in Communications.

== Discography ==
=== Studio albums ===
List of studio albums, with selected chart positions
Title	Album details	Peak chart positions	
Title	Album details	US Chr	US Gos
Culture Shock	Released: August 2, 2011; Label: Outlet; CD, digital download	45	25
