= V. Rose (album) =

Studio album by V. Rose
- Released: August 16, 2011
- Genres: Christian electronic dance music, contemporary R&B, electropop
- Length: 49:58
- Label: Clear Sight

V. Rose chronology
V. Rose (2011)	Forever After (2014)

Singles from V. Rose
- 1. "Not So Average" Released: 2011; 2. "Battery (feat. Flame)" Released: 2011

Alternative cover

Singles from The Electro-Pop Deluxe
- 1. "Turn Up Your Light (feat. KJ-52)" Released: 2013

V. Rose is the eponymously titled debut studio album from Christian music recording artist V. Rose. The album released on August 16, 2011 through Clear Sight Music. It was re-released February 25, 2013 as The Electro-Pop Deluxe featuring a second disc with six extra tracks.

== Background ==
During her teenage years, V. Rose founded the group Harmony with childhood friend. When V. Rose was 15, producer SPEC signed the group to Spechouse Media, but Harmony soon folded in 2005. After the disbandment of Harmony, Dare signed to Spechouse as a solo artist, and she eventually appeared on two songs by FLAME on his album Captured, including the hit single "Captured". She subsequently signed to FLAME's Clear Sight label, and released V. Rose through that label in 2011.

== Style ==
Critics found the musical style on V. Rose to be a mixture of pop, hip hop, R&B, rock, gospel, and electronic dance music, and compared it to Britt Nicole, Jamie Grace, Katy Perry, Krystal Meyers, Miley Cyrus, Michael Jackson, and Selena Gomez. Louder Than the Music described the opening song, "Not Ashamed", as falling "into the same bracket as J-Lo, mixed with the female vocalists from Glee" and the song "Run That Way" as having "a Shakira sound to it." New Release Tuesday described the song "Not So Average" as reminiscent of Mary J. Blige, "Christian Girl" as evoking Ke$ha, Avril Lavigne, and Mýa, "Hater" as "Alicia Keys/Pink-like" and "Dear Adam" and "Let's Go Home" as similar to Michael Jackson. Jesus Freak Hideout stated that "the pop, R&B, and rock sound on the album's opening track is used much throughout the entire release, and said that Dare "should soon find herself among the elite in that great radio-play-type of girl-power-pop sound." New Release Tuesday described V. Rose as ranging from "rock to pop to R&B to rap to straight-up, old-school Gospel." Louder Than the Music said that "This album jumps from very girly-girly bubblegum pop to big dance anthems with big bass tones and big drum beats." Christian Music Zine stated that "Throughout the album you’ll find yourself thinking you’re listening to a pop album, a hip hop album or a jazzy gospel album".

== Critical reception ==
Professional ratings
Review scores
Source	Rating
CCM Magazine	3/5 stars
Christian Music Zine	4/5 stars
Cross Rhythms	8/10 squares
Jesus Freak Hideout	3.5/5 stars
Louder Than the Music	4/5 stars
New Release Tuesday	3.5/5 stars

V. Rose received generally positive reception from the ratings and reviews of music critics. At New Release Tuesday, Marcus Hathcock rated the album three-and-a-half stars out of five, indicating how the material on the release contains an "unashamed expression" of faith, and "it is fresh, relevant, fun and competent." Andy Argyrakis of CCM Magazine rated the album three stars out of five, highlighting how the music on the release is "presenting upbeat pop production set to spiritually-grounded lyrics." At Jesus Freak Hideout, Kevin Hoskins rated the album three-and-a-half stars out of five, remarking how on just a few tracks it was a somewhat unfinished, yet he calls it "a stellar freshman release" that "should be picked up by party music lovers everywhere." Ian Hayter of Cross Rhythms rated the album eight squares out of ten, stating how it contains a "catchy set of songs", and notes that "with its quality production and strong hooks will appeal to teens and pre-teens everywhere." At Christian Music Zine, Tyler Hess rated the album four stars out of five, writing how at moments it shows some immaturity, yet the lyricism is "genuine and bold". Jono Davies of Louder Than the Music rated the album four stars out of five, saying this is "a great set of songs from a very talented pop singer."

== Track listing ==
Tracklist
No.	Title	Writer(s)	Length
1.	"Not So Average"	Vienna Rose Dare, Lamontt Blackshire, Kenya Ngariuku, Lance Tolbert	3:28
2.	"Christian Girl"	Dare, Blackshire	3:31
3.	"Battery" (featuring Flame)	Dare, Blackshire, Marcus T. Gray, Ngariuku	3:54
4.	"Hater"	Dare, Blackshire, Ngariuku, Tolbert	3:40
5.	"Run That Way"	Dare, Blackshire, Ngariuku	3:52
6.	"Dear Adam"	Dare, Blackshire, Tolbert	5:04
7.	"In Dependence"	Dare, Blackshire	3:49
8.	"Girl, What You Lookin' At?!"	Dare, Blackshire, Ngariuku	4:06
9.	"Let's Go Home"	Dare, Blackshire, Ngariuku, Tolbert	3:46
10.	"Love Pursuit" (featuring John Katina)	Dare, Blackshire	3:35
11.	"Forgive Me"	Dare, Blackshire, Ngariuku, Tolbert	4:52
12.	"Cry Holy"	Dare, Blackshire, Tolbert	6:21
Total length:			49:58
