= S.O. (rapper) =

American rapper

- Also known as: S.O., Seun Otukpe
- Born: Oluwaseun Oluwatosin Otukpe; 5 December 1988 (age 37); Nigeria
- Origin: London, England
- Genres: Christian hip hop, urban contemporary gospel
- Occupations: Singer, songwriter, rapper
- Instrument: Vocals
- Years active: 2010–present
- Labels: Lamp Mode

Oluwaseun Oluwatosin Otukpe (born 5 December 1988) who goes by the stage name S.O. or Seun Otukpe in full, is a Nigerian Christian hip hop musician of British citizenship, currently based in Texas, United States. So It Begins was released independently in 2011. Lamp Mode Recordings released his second studio album So It Continues in 2012, and this album would be his breakthrough release on the Billboard charts.

== Early life ==
S.O. was born Oluwaseun Oluwatosin Otukpe, in Nigeria on 5 December 1988. His family moved to London in the United Kingdom, when S.O. was nine years old.

== Music career ==
S.O. started making music in 2010. He became signed to Lamp Mode Recordings in 2012, after they heard 2011's So It Begins. So It Continues was his second album, and this helped the artist to crack the Billboard charts. He is a featured artist on the song "Get It Got It" that's on No Filter by Json. His third studio album, So It Ends, was released on 16 October 2015, from Lamp Mode Recordings, where it placed on two Billboard charts. Since his last full-length album, S.O. has released multiple singles for digital download.

== Discography ==
=== Studio albums ===
List of studio albums, with selected chart positions
Title	Album details	Peak chart positions			
Title	Album details	US Christ	US Gospel	US Heat	US Rap
So It Begins	Released: 28 June 2011; Label: Independent; CD, digital download	—	—	—	—
So It Continues	Released: 13 November 2012; Label: Lamp Mode; CD, digital download	—	36	—	24
So It Ends	Released: 16 October 2015; Label: Lamp Mode; CD, digital download	24	—	8	—
Augustine's Legacy	Released: 6 September 2019; Label: Independent; CD, digital download	—	—	—	—
