= Growing Pains (Json album) =

Studio album by Json
- Released: February 21, 2012
- Genre: Christian hip hop
- Length: 59:39
- Label: Lamp Mode
- Producer: Benjah, Black Knight, Chike, Geeda, GP, J-Luv, J.R., Sky, Steve-T, Street Symphony, Wit

Json chronology
City Lights (2010)	Growing Pains (2012)	Braille (2013)

Growing Pains is the fourth album from Json. Lamp Mode Recordings released the project on February 21, 2012.

== Reception ==
Professional ratings
Review scores
Source	Rating
Cross Rhythms	8/10 squares
Indie Vision Music	3/5 stars
Jesus Freak Hideout	4/5 stars
New Release Tuesday	5/5 stars
Rapzilla	4/5

Signaling in a four out of five review by Rapzilla, Nyon Smith recognizes, "Maybe Growing Pains would have had a greater impact had the aesthetically darker tracks preluded the more mainstream 'feel good' tracks. Regardless, Growing Pains is still an album that is greater than the sum of its parts." Michael Weaver, indicating for Jesus Freak Hideout in a four star out of five review, realizes, "While there are a couple of songs worthy of the skip button and one noticeably weak track, the remaining good songs are really good. Unashamed, Godly lyrics based in scripture rule Growing Pains, and while it's not the most unique album musically, it's still solid." Signaling in a five star review by New Release Tuesday, Mark Ryan replies, "From top to bottom this album is solid... [and] such a consistent piece of art." In an eight out of ten review by Steve Hayes from Cross Rhythms, responds, "Json brings an honest project, mixing varied instrumentals." Josh Burkey, writing a three star out of five review for Indie Vision Music, reports, "Pain is solid in its deliverance, honest in its lyrics and contains a mixture of beats from young and old hip hop."

== Track listing ==
No.	Title	Producer(s)	Length
1.	"Growing Pains Intro"	Black Knight	2:51
2.	"Making Me Over" (featuring Ad3 and Tedashii)	Street Symphony	4:26
3.	"2 Human" (featuring Lecrae)	J-Luv	4:26
4.	"G.P. (Interlude 1)"	Chike	1:42
5.	"Held It Down" (featuring Butta-P and Ron Kenoly, Jr.)	Benjah and Sky	4:11
6.	"It's Alright" (featuring Mikeschair)	Benjah	3:28
7.	"I the Beast"	Wit	3:06
8.	"Brand New" (featuring God's Servant and Steve T)	Steve-T	3:46
9.	"G.P. (Interlude 2)"	Chike	1:39
10.	"My Joy" (featuring Jai)	Wit	4:20
11.	"Behind the Clouds" (featuring Chris Lee)	J.R.	4:00
12.	"We Not Folding" (featuring Black Knight & Trubble)	Geeda	3:59
13.	"Secrets (Interlude)"		0:44
14.	"Secrets" (featuring J.R.)	J.R.	4:15
15.	"Credits Roll" (featuring Benjah)	J.R.	3:47
16.	"G.P. (Interlude 3)"		1:27
17.	"Goodbye"	GP	2:00
18.	"Parent Me" (Bonus Track)		4:32
Total length:			59:39

== Charts ==
Chart (2012)	Peak position
US Top Christian Albums (Billboard)	16
US Top Gospel Albums (Billboard)	11
US Heatseekers Albums (Billboard)	5
US Independent Albums (Billboard)	35
US Top Rap Albums (Billboard)	20
