= Forever After =

Studio album by V. Rose
- Released: May 20, 2014
- Genres: Christian hip hop, Christian electronic dance music, urban gospel
- Length: 53:06
- Label: Clear Sight
- Producer: Lamontt Blackshire

V. Rose chronology
V. Rose (2011)	Forever After (2014)	Hearts Up EP (2015)

Singles from Forever After
- 1. "No Better U" Released: 2014; 2. "Am I Trending? (feat. Flame)" Released: 2014

Forever After is the second studio album from Christian musician and singer V. Rose. The album released on May 20, 2014 by Clear Sight Music, and it was produced by Lamontt Blackshire. The album currently has received three positive reviews, and it charted on two Billboard charts.

== Background ==
This album is the successor to V. Rose's eponymously-titled debut studio album that came out in 2011. Forever After was released by Clear Sight Music on May 20, 2014. It was produced by Lamontt Blackshire.

== Music and lyrics ==
The music on Forever After is described as CCM, EDM, electropop, contemporary R&B, and hip hop. The music contains a lyrical focus on "waiting for that one day when there will be no more pain, sadness, or tears", with the songstress taking a "lyrically encouraging direction."

== Critical reception ==
Professional ratings
Review scores
Source	Rating
CCM Magazine	2/5 stars
Cross Rhythms	5/10 squares
Jesus Freak Hideout	4/5 stars
New Release Tuesday	4/5 stars

At Jesus Freak Hideout, Kevin Hoskins rated the album four stars out of five, remarking how "V. Rose is a rather unique pop vocalist and this album carries the weight to be played at house parties with the focus being entirely centered on Christ." However, Hoskins criticizing the sections where she "trades in vocal quality for volume, detracting from her clear talent." Caitlin Elizabeth Lassiter of New Release Tuesday rated the album four stars out of five, indicating how "Forever After boasts some impressive collaborations, pairing up the vocal techniques of V. Rose with the rap stylings of artists like Flame, Shonlock, and da T.R.U.T.H." At Wade-O Radio, Branden Murphy gave a positive review, highlighting the release as "a top quality project with great production, uplifting messages, and a Christ honoring direction." In a two star review by CCM Magazine, Grace S. Aspinwall cautioning, "With its smart, though not fantastic, vocals and arrangements, this is definitely worth a listen." Tony Cummings, rating the album a five out of ten from Cross Rhythms, writes, "But in truth 'Forever After' falls between the pop and hip-hop fields and won't satisfy many followers of either."

== Commercial performance ==
For the Billboard charting week of June 7, 2014, Forever After charted as the No. 28 most sold album in the Christian Albums market, and it was the No. 16 most sold album in the breaking-and-entry market via the Heatseekers Albums.

== Track listing ==
Track list
No.	Title	Writer(s)	Length
1.	"No Better U (Glee Club Intro)"	Vienna Dare, Lamontt Blackshire	0:46
2.	"No Better You"	Dare, Blackshire	3:30
3.	"Nothing for Love"	Dare, Blackshire	5:29
4.	"Am I Trending?" (featuring Flame)	Dare, Blackshire, Marcus Gray	4:00
5.	"Forever Endeavor" (featuring Shonlock)	Dare, Blackshire, Deshon Bullock	4:50
6.	"When He Finds You"	Dare, Blackshire	4:45
7.	"Worshipping Tonight" (featuring Da' T.R.U.T.H.)	Dare, Blackshire, Emanuel Lambert, Jr.	4:08
8.	"Forget about the World"	Dare, Blackshire	4:16
9.	"Crown Thief"	Dare, Blackshire	4:07
10.	". :("	Dare, Blackshire	5:50
11.	"Tortured Mind"	Dare, Blackshire	3:47
12.	"King Kong Skyline"	Dare, Blackshire	3:52
13.	"Turn up Your Light" (featuring KJ-52)	Dare, Blackshire Jonah Sorrentino	3:46
Total length:			53:06

== Chart performance ==
Chart (2014)	Peak position
US Top Christian Albums (Billboard)	28
US Heatseekers Albums (Billboard)	16
