= The Blackout (album) =

Studio album by PRo
- Released: October 31, 2008
- Genre: Christian hip hop
- Label: Reflection

PRo chronology
| My Name is Pro (The Introduction) (2008) | The Blackout (2008) | PSA (2010) |

The Blackout is the debut studio album by American Christian hip hop artist Derek Minor (at the time went under PRo), released on October 31, 2008, through his label Reflection Music Group (at the time named Christ Like Entertainment). The album was noted for its "braggadocios" approach. The song "Hate Me More", featuring Kingstone, was released as a promotional single through the Christian hip hop website DaSouth.com.

== Track listing ==
| No. | Title | Length |
|---|---|---|
| 1. | "C.L.E (Intro)" | 0:08 |
| 2. | "Birth of a King" | 4:08 |
| 3. | "That Real" | 4:06 |
| 4. | "Let Me Know" (featuring eYe Q) | 3:59 |
| 5. | "Shut Em Down" (featuring Pettidee) | 4:11 |
| 6. | "Without You" (featuring Coko Korrine) | 3:26 |
| 7. | "Bet I Bounce Back" | 4:04 |
| 8. | "Where You At" (featuring Brothatone) | 4:03 |
| 9. | "More" (featuring Dorian Lee) | 3:44 |
| 10. | "Hate Me More" (featuring Kingston) | 3:45 |
| 11. | "What I'm Working With" | 3:43 |
| 12. | "Bring It Back" (featuring Willie Will) | 3:49 |
| 13. | "I Bet He Lying" | 4:15 |
| 14. | "Hot In Here" | 3:13 |
| 15. | "If I Don't Wake" (featuring Soul P) | 3:39 |
| 16. | "You Know the Deal" | 3:40 |
| 17. | "Yeah" | 3:52 |
