= Braille scale =

In aircraft and armored vehicle scale modeling, Braille scale commonly means 1/72 or 1/76 scale. The term was coined by the owners of Missing-Lynx web forum in 1998. Other forums have taken a liking to the phrase since then, and incorporated in their own websites.
