= William Pitt (singer) =

American born pop singer

- Origin: United States
- Genre: Dance-pop
- Years active: 1986–present
- Labels: CBS, Public, Jupiter Records

William Pitt (William Frederick Pate) is an American-born pop singer whose single "City Lights" became a hit in several European countries in 1987.

== Biography ==
William Pitt started singing and playing guitar in 1955 when he acquired a Sears Roebuck Harmony guitar. During the 1980s, while living in Paris, William Pitt was signed to a record deal by music producer Pascal Wüthrich.

William Pitt's single "City Lights" became a hit on its first release in France, in 1986. After this, it became a hit in several other European countries following a re-release in 1987. In the Netherlands, "City Lights" reached the Top 20. The song was a disco hit in Italy during the summer of 1986, and reached the charts in 1987, peaking at 17. William Pitt's follow-up single "Funny Girl" only made it to the lower regions of the German and Belgium charts. A comeback single was released in 1990.

== Discography ==
=== Singles ===
Year	Title	Peak chart positions							
Year	Title	AUT	BEL	FRA	GER	NLD	SPA	SWI	UK
1986	"City Lights"	—	—	47	—	—	—	—	—
1987	"City Lights" (re-release)	16	14	—	15	15	5	13	94
1987	"Funny Girl"	—	15	—	64	—	—	—	—
1990	"Such a Lonely Night (I'm Crazy to Leave You)"	—	—	—	—	—	—	—	—
"—" denotes releases that did not chart.
