= Dying to Live (Derek Minor album) =

Studio album by PRo
- Released: August 23, 2011
- Genre: Christian hip hop
- Label: Reflection; Reach

PRo chronology
Redemption (2010)	Dying to Live (2011)	PSA, Vol. 3: Who Is Derek Minor? (2012)

Dying to Live is the third studio album by American Christian hip hop artist Derek Minor (who at the time went by the name PRo), released on August 23, 2011 through Reflection Music Group and Reach Records a part of his joint venture two-album deal with Reach.

Professional ratings
Review scores
Source	Rating
Jesus Freak Hideout	4.5/5 stars

== Track listing ==
No.	Title	Length
1.	"A Life Worth Dying For"	3:24
2.	"Mission To Mars" (featuring PK)	3:01
3.	"Full Court Mess" (featuring KB)	3:36
4.	"Get It" (featuring Rick Trotter)	3:29
5.	"Before I Die"	4:06
6.	"This Can't Be" (featuring Jenny Norlin)	4:14
7.	"Stronger" (featuring Jai)	3:38
8.	"Merked Pt. 2"	3:21
9.	"Going In" (featuring Lecrae and Tedashii)	4:17
10.	"So Far Gone" (featuring Nya)	3:46
11.	"No Limits" (featuring Rio)	3:51
12.	"Beautiful" (featuring PK)	3:57
13.	"Drink From His Cup" (featuring Suzy Rock)	3:56
14.	"No One Greater" (featuring Json and Trip Lee)	4:13
15.	"Never Back Down" (featuring S.O. and This'l)	4:38
16.	"Get Buck" (featuring Chad Jones, Brothatone and Canon: bonus track)	3:53
