= Benjah =

American rapper

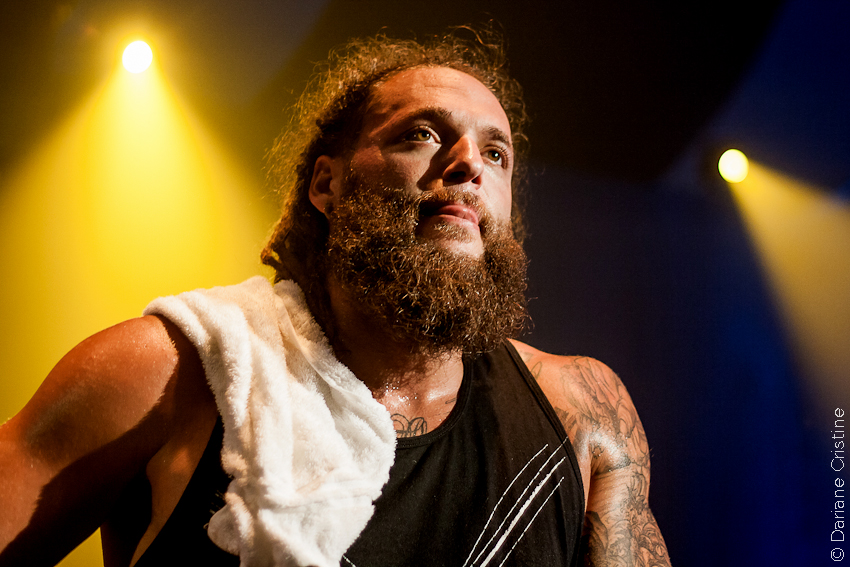
- Benjah in 2013

Background information
- Born: April 20, 1983 (age 41); Hastings, Nebraska
- Origin: Orlando, Florida
- Genres: reggae
- Occupation(s): Producer, songwriter, mix engineer
- Instrument(s): Vocals, guitar
- Years active: 2009–present
- Labels: Jahmen Music Group
- Website: benjahmusic.com

Benjamin "Benjah" Thom (born April 20, 1983), who goes by the stage name Benjah, is an American songwriter and producer. He has released seven studio albums since 2009.

== Early life ==
Benjah was born on April 20, 1983, in Hastings, Nebraska. He currently resides Orlando, Florida, and formerly Memphis, Tennessee. Before he started writing music Benjah was planning on playing professional football until November 19, 2001, when he was in a car crash that ruptured his spleen. While Benjah did recover his friend John Randal "J.T." Thomas, who was driving the car, was killed in the accident. Benjah says that without this accident he never would have started writing music.

== Music career ==
His music recording career began in 2003 after graduating from Fullsail University in Orlando, Florida. He started out as an engineer and very quickly grew into a producer. Throughout the years of working he started to help artists write hooks and eventually grew into his own as an artist. In 2009, Benjah recorded his first studio album, Filtered, that was released by Infinity Music Group, on June 1, 2009. The next album was a co-release with Dillavou, Lov'd Ones, on November 16, 2010, with Jahmen Music Group. He released, The Break-Up, on September 27, 2011, with Jahmen Music Group in association with 220 Entertainment and Capitol CMG. His subsequent studio album, Vanity Fare, was released on March 19, 2013, from Jahmen Music Group. This album was his breakthrough release upon the Billboard charts, where it reached #12 on the Gospel Albums and #43 on the Heatseekers Albums chart. Benjah released a remix album, Haze & Reflections: Vanity Fare Remixed, on November 5, 2013. This remix album charted on two Billboard charts, on the Reggae Albums at #3 and Gospel Albums at #41. His fifth studio album, Motives, was released on November 13, 2015, and it charted on two Billboard charts, Christian Albums at #42 and Heatseekers Albums at #18. Benjah’s sixth studio album, Woke, was released on November 11, 2016, and charted on four Billboard charts, Heatseekers South Atlantic at No. 6, Heatseekers at #19, Christian Albums at #32 and Christian/Gospel at #36.

== Discography ==
Studio albums

- Filtered (June 1, 2009, Infinity)
- Lov'd Ones, with Dillavou, (November 16, 2010, Jahmen)
- The Break-Up (September 27, 2011, 220/Jahmen/Capitol CMG)
- Vanity Fare (March 19, 2013, Jahmen)
- Motives (November 13, 2015, Jahmen)
- Woke (November 11, 2016, Jahmen)
- Guidance (November 10, 2017, Jahmen)
- PainTings (July 27, 2018, Jahmen)
- Roots Passion (March 1, 2019, Jahmen)
- Suppliah (June 19, 2020, Jahmen)

Remix albums

- Haze & Reflections: Vanity Fare Remixed (November 5, 2013)
