= Json (rapper) =

American rapper

- Born: Jason Christopher Watson; June 22, 1981 (age 45); St. Louis, Missouri, U.S.
- Origin: Iowa City, Iowa, U.S.
- Genres: Christian hip hop
- Occupations: Singer, songwriter
- Instrument: Vocals
- Years active: 1993–present
- Label: Lamp Mode

Jason Christopher Watson (born June 22, 1981), who goes by the stage name Json, is an American Christian hip hop musician. He was a member of Christian hip hop collective, 116 Clique.

== Early life ==
Json was born Jason Christopher Watson, in St. Louis, Missouri on June 22, 1981. When he was three years old his father died. His mother Barbara moved the family to Los Angeles, California, where she became a crack-cocaine addict and was arrested, separating herself from her son because she was forced to move back to St. Louis. Json would soon follow her back to the Midwest city, became a drug abuser, and was incarcerated.

== Personal life ==
Json married his longtime girlfriend Lawanda Nicole "Nikki" Watson (née, Childress), after they both stopped abusing drugs, and converted to Christianity. They reside with their children in Iowa City, Iowa. They are the co-directors of The Spot Outreach Ministry of Parkview Church.

== Music career ==
Json was a member in the Christian hip hop collective 116 Clique. He released The Seasoning in 2005, Life on Life in 2008, City Lights in 2010, Growing Pains in 2012, and Braille in 2013. The last three of those albums charted on various Billboard charts. The rapper planned to release his sixth studio album, No Filter, on March 10, 2015, through Lamp Mode Recordings.

== Discography ==
=== Studio albums ===
List of studio albums, with selected chart positions
Title	Album details	Peak chart positions		
Title	Album details	US Chr	US Gos	US Rap
The Seasoning	Released: 2005; Label: Hid In Christ Ministries; CD, digital download	—	—	—
Life on Life	Released: 2008; Label: Lamp Mode; CD, digital download	—	—	—
City Lights	Released: July 20, 2010; Label: Lamp Mode; CD, digital download	46	11	—
Growing Pains	Released: February 21, 2012; Label: Lamp Mode; CD, digital download	16	11	20
Braille	Released: June 18, 2013; Label: Lamp Mode; CD, digital download	11	5	23
No Filter	Released: March 10, 2015; Label: Lamp Mode; CD, digital download	17	—	24
Foreign, Vol. 1	Released: July 8, 2016; Label: Lamp Mode; CD, digital download	39	—	—
