= Dee-1 =

American rapper from Louisiana

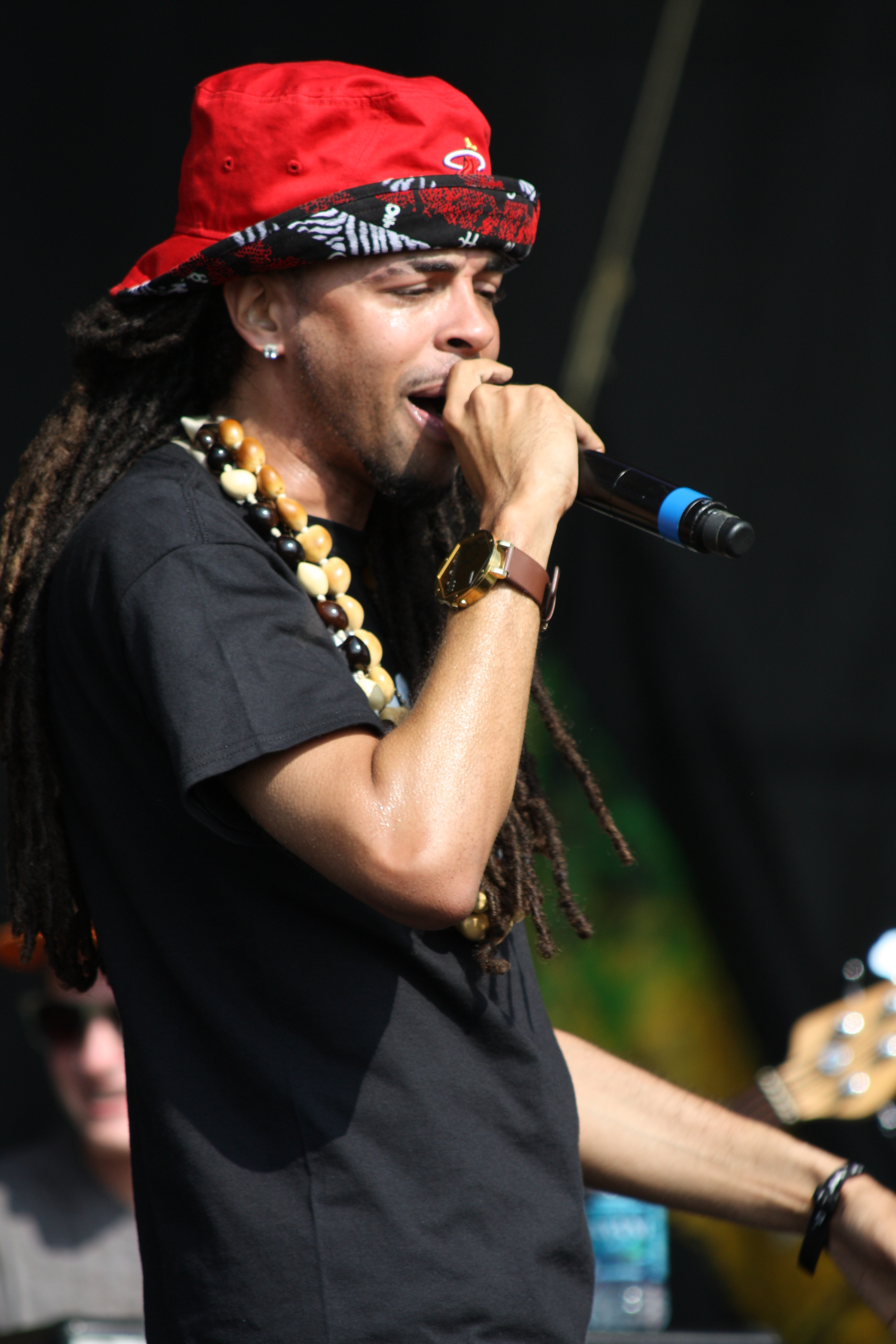
- Dee-1 performing at Jazz Fest

Background information
- Born: David Arnold Augustine Jr. April 10, 1985 (age 41); New Orleans, Louisiana, U.S.
- Genres: Hip hop; Christian hip hop
- Occupations: Rapper; author; songwriter; educator; public speaker; actor; television presenter
- Years active: 2008–present
- Labels: Mission Vision; RCA Inspiration

David Arnold Augustine Jr. (born April 10, 1985), known professionally as Dee-1, is an American rapper, author, educator, and activist from New Orleans, Louisiana. The success of his 2010 single, "Jay, 50, and Weezy", led him to sign a recording contract with RCA Inspiration three years later. In 2019, he parted ways with the label in favor of an independent career.

Also known for his social and educational work, he was appointed by his home state's governor, John Bel Edwards, to the lead the Louisiana Council for the Success of Black Men and Boys in 2021. Augustine is a 2022-2023 Nasir Jones Hip Hop fellow at Harvard University. In 2024, began teaching a self-designed course at Tufts University, "The Intersection of Hip Hop and Social Change".

Augustine's accolades include an NAACP Power of Influence Award, and an Emmy Award nomination for hosting The Manhattan Project (2021).

== Biography ==
=== Early life ===
Hailing from New Orleans East, he attended Audubon Montessori School (currently Audubon Charter School) through 8th grade. He was a star basketball player at Ben Franklin High School as well as homecoming king his senior year. He was raised Catholic.

=== Career ===
==== Early stages ====
He began rapping while in college. He began publicly performing while attending LSU. After graduating from LSU in 2008, he started teaching middle school math in Baton Rouge. By the end of 2008, he had released three mixtapes: It's Only Tha Beginning, Still We Rise and I Am Who I Am. Dee-1 has been featured in national media outlets such as CNN, Billboard, and the Washington Post. He has also received attention from Louisiana newspapers and music magazines. After two years of teaching, he resigned before the 2010–2011 school year to focus on his music as a career.

==== Growing popularity ====
His first studio album, David & Goliath, was released on April 13, 2009. In August 2009, Dee-1 released a Saints-themed song with trumpet player and Rapper Ty Ochsen, titled "Bring Em to the Dome". Additionally, Dee-1 performed alongside nationally touring acts such as Lil Wayne, Lupe Fiasco, Drake, Trey Songz, Akon, The Roots, Mýa, The Clipse, Musiq Soulchild, Fat Joe, Lil Boosie, Juvenile, Big K.R.I.T. and Big Boi. In October 2010, he was named Artist of the Year at the NOLA Underground Hip Hop Awards.

Dee-1 majorly rose to hip-hop's spotlight after the release of his song and music video, "Jay, 50, & Weezy," in 2010. The single received national attention and was praised for its narrative-driven storytelling and "sheer audacity that he displayed by calling out three of the game's biggest rappers, but mostly because of the song's strong message."

In the same year, Dee-1 released his fourth mixtape, I Hope They Hear Me Vol.1. The project received positive attention, and after his Vol 1.5 installation to the mixtape series, he released I Hope They Hear Me Vol. 2. With acclaimed tracks, such as "Jay, 50 & Weezy" occupying the 18-song track list, Dee-1's collaboration with Mannie Fresh made for another high-profile record from the project, "The One That Got Away". The track was produced by Flight School Productions and is complete with a music video for the 2011 single.

In 2011, Dee-1 toured with Atlanta rappers Killer Mike and Young Dro, as well as the southern California-based rap group Pac Div. Following that tour, between 2011 and 2013, he has also toured with artists such as Macklemore (opening for The Heist Tour), Murs (Ridin' All By Ourselves Tour), and Lecrae (Higher Learning Tour). Dee-1 toured with Macklemore in 2012. Dee-1 developed a close relationship with Chicago rapper Lupe Fiasco while joining him on the Tetsuo Youth Tour of 2013 as well. Dee-1's unique artistry brought him to BET's 2014 Hip Hop Awards along with O.T. Genasis, Lil Mama, Logic and Detroit Che.

Dee-1's The Focus Tape helped sustain his career momentum next, released in 2012 and featured a handful of hip-hop's biggest names; "Work" featuring Lecrae, "The Man In My City" featuring Juvenile and Mannie Fresh, "The Very Best" featuring Yassin Bey and Mannie Fresh, and "Never Clockin Out (Remix)" featuring Killer Mike. He released a series of conscious-rap driven singles such as "You Stupid Fool" and "Shut Up And Grind".

==== Record deal ====
After signing with RCA Inspiration in 2013, he released his first EP, 3s Up, featuring six tracks and heralding Dee-1's three-piece motto: "Be Real. Be Righteous. Be Relevant.". The EP peaked at No. 9 on Billboard's Top Rap Albums in 2015. "Against Us" was the first single from the EP, released in 2014. The track delivered a powerful testament combating the ills of society and the Hollywood industry. Dee-1 created the "Against Us (Remix)" in 2016 and enlisted Big K.R.I.T. and Lupe Fiasco as featuring acts. Among other topics, he addressed his affecting lyrical subject matter and personal faith, like that of "Against Us", on the popular radio segment Sway's Universe with Sway Calloway. He discussed the importance of improving his personal life and increasing his faith in some of the music industry's moral corruption. The interview inspired the track on 3s Up, fittingly titled "The Sway Interview". Dee-1 admitted that he was spiritually in a dark place during the time in his life when the interview was conducted. He credits it as "life-saving", to which Calloway praised as a "Grammy" honor for him. "I'm Not Perfect (I'm A Christian)" from the 3s Up EP also emphasizes the depth of his Christianity.

What would have been Dee-1's latest mixtape, Separated at Birth, was influenced by the sound and production of Lil Wayne, scheduled to be released in 2015. Due to conflicts concerning the mixtape's lyrical content and Cash Money Records, Lil Wayne's home label, the project was not publicly released.

Dee-1 released "Sallie Mae Back" in 2016, a hyper-energetic track celebrating the completion of his student loan payoffs. In addition to his own budgeting, he used a part of his label signing advance to pay off the loans. The track received critical acclaim from CNN, ESPN, Forbes and Time magazine. The Washington Post called it the "anthem of a generation" and landed Dee-1 a seat on Fox's leading talk show, The Real, as well as ESPN's His & Hers with Michael Smith and Jemele Hill.

The success of the track also led to ESPN recruiting Dee-1 for the theme song, "We Are The Undefeated", of its sports, race, and culture website, The Undefeated. He also penned lyrics for the "F.A.S.T. Song", a track for the American Heart Association raising stroke awareness.

Dee-1 headlined his first nationwide tour of 2016 titled The Slingshot David Mixtape Tour, following the release of The Slingshot David Mixtape in July of that year. His first studio album under the RCA imprint, Slingshot David, was released on November 10, 2017. The album's lead single, "Hood Villains", was handpicked by Lupe Fiasco, and the project boasts names such as Sevyn Streeter and Avery Wilson.

==== Independent artist ====
In 2019, it was announced that Dee-1 left RCA Records and started up his own independent label called Mission Vision Music. He released his second studio album God and Girls under the new label. On April 30, 2020, Dee-1 released a solo project titled Timeless, ahead of his collaborative album with Murs, which followed on September 18, 2020. Titled, He's the Christian, I'm the Rapper, the 11-track project was produced entirely by Curtiss King, and sees the rappers "swap bars and recruit a few collaborators for some standout moments".

In 2020, Dee-1 was honored by the NAACP with the "Power of Image" award for his influential impact and promoting positivity in the community.

In 2021, he became the first rapper in history to be appointed to a statewide position by a governor, John Bel Edwards of Louisiana, joining the Louisiana Council for the "Success of Black Men and Boys." He was also nominated for an Emmy Award in 2021 for hosting "The Manhattan Project". In September, Dee-1 featured The Game and Des Monroe on a single titled "Shine On". The song spoke about his journey from interning for the successful West Coast recording artist (The Game) in college to now featuring him on a song of his own, alongside other personal accounts of his life shared in the track.

In 2022, Dee-1 released another studio album as an independent artist on February 9 called Finding Balance, which debuted at #4 on the iTunes Hip-Hop/Rap Albums chart. Days before the album's release, another nationwide tour (The Not Afraid Tour) was announced to begin in March.

Activism in Hip Hop

Dee-1 has established himself as a prominent and articulate advocate within the hip-hop community, urging fans, artists, and record labels to refrain from endorsing and glorifying music that promotes violence, drug dealing, drug use, and the degradation of women. To further this mission, he developed the Platinum Pledge, a collective initiative designed to unite individuals who pledge not to create, support, or propagate music containing harmful lyrics.

== Discography ==
=== Studio albums ===
- I Am Who I Am (2008)
- David and Goliath (2009)
- Slingshot David: The Album (2017)
- God and Girls (2019)
- He's the Christian, I'm the Rapper (2020) (with Murs)
- Finding Balance (2022)
- God and Girls 2 (2022)
- UNO (2023)
- From the Hood to Harvard (2023)
- L.O.A.D.E.D (Life of a Disruptor Evolving Daily) (2024)
- Hipocritical Hop (2025)
- The Shift (2026)

=== Compilation albums ===
- Timeless (2020)
- Timeless, Vol. 2 (2025)

=== EPs ===
- 3's Up (2015)

=== Mixtapes ===
- It's Only Tha Beginning (2004)
- Still We Rise (2006)
- I Am Who I Am (2008)
- I Hope They Hear Me (2010)
- I Hope They Hear Me Vol. 1.5 (2010)
- I Hope They Hear Me Vol. 2 (2011)
- The Focus Tape (2012)
- Psalms of David (2013)
- Psalms of David Vol.2 (2013)
- Free Lunch And Sallie Mae (2014)
- Slingshot David (The Mixtape) (2016)

=== Singles ===
- 2010: "Jay, 50 & Weezy"
- 2010: "One Man Army" (produced by Flight School Productions)
- 2011: "It's My Turn"
- 2011: "Blue"
- 2011: "The One That Got Away" (featuring Mannie Fresh, produced by Flight School Productions)
- 2011: "I'm On It" (featuring Shamarr Allen)
- 2011: "Uncle Tom" (produced by Flight School Productions)
- 2012: "SUAG" (produced by Flight School Productions)
- 2012: "You Stupid Fool"
- 2012: "Work" (featuring Lecrae)
- 2013: "Dear Mr. Christian" (by Derek Minor featuring Dee-1 and Lecrae)
- 2014: "Against Us"
- 2015: "Can't Ban Tha Hopeman" (produced by Greedy Money)
- 2016: "Sallie Mae Back" (produced by Justen Williams)
- 2016: "Against Us (Remix)" (featuring Big K.R.I.T. and Lupe Fiasco)
- 2020: "Corona Clap"
- 2022: "No Fear" (with Mac)
- 2023: "My Happy"
- 2023: "Lines Drawn"

== Filmography ==
- Treme (2012)
- Maul Dogs (2015)
