= Redemption (Derek Minor album) =

Studio album by PRo
- Released: July 13, 2010
- Genre: Christian hip hop
- Label: Reflection

PRo chronology
PSA (2010)	Redemption (2010)	PSA, Vol. 2 (2011)

Redemption is the second studio album by American Christian hip hop artist Derek Minor, then known as PRo, released on July 13, 2010 through his own label, Reflection Music Group. In promotion of the album, a short film, also titled Redemption, was released, and the track listing was announced on June 29, 2010. The album met with a mixed reception from critics. Bob Marovich of the Journal of Gospel Music praised the album, giving it a four out of five, but Brad Davis of Holy Culture was less favorable, rating the album six-and-a-half out of ten and stating that he disliked the new direction of PRo now that he partnered with Reach.

== Track listing ==
No.	Title	Length
1.	"God"	3:11
2.	"Hold Me Down"	4:11
3.	"Clear the Air" (featuring Lecrae)	3:51
4.	"Know You" (featuring Rick Trotter)	4:21
5.	"Low"	4:10
6.	"Aye You"	3:47
7.	"In the Club" (featuring Convention)	3:54
8.	"This Cage"	3:48
9.	"Merked"	4:13
10.	"Not Guilty"	4:08
11.	"Bout Dat"	3:16
12.	"Power to Die" (featuring Brothatone)	4:28
13.	"Fight Music"	3:56
14.	"On It" (featuring Conviction and Canon)	4:20
15.	"All I Know"	4:28
16.	"Depend On You" (featuring Chris Davids)	3:52
17.	"Slave to You"	3:26
18.	"Blow My Mind [Bonus Track]" (featuring Chris Davids)	3:26
19.	"Who I Be [Bonus Track]" (featuring Canon)	4:00
20.	"Murder Swag [Bonus Track]"	3:07
