= Young Dangerous Heart (V. Rose album) =

Studio album by V. Rose
- Released: April 22, 2016
- Genres: Contemporary Christian music; Christian hip hop; pop
- Length: 46:58
- Label: Inpop

V. Rose chronology
Hearts Up EP (2015)	Young Dangerous Heart (2016)	Forth (2019)

Singles from Young Dangerous Heart
- 1. "Storms" Released: 2016; 2. "Sinking Deep" Released: 2016; 3. "I Love You So Much (ILYSM) (feat. Trip Lee)" Released: 2016

Young Dangerous Heart is the third studio album from V. Rose. Inpop Records released the album on April 22, 2016.

== Critical reception ==
Professional ratings
Review scores
Source	Rating
365 Days of Inspiring Media	4.5/5 stars
CCM Magazine	4/5 stars
Jesus Wired	78/100
New Release Today	3.5/5 stars

Andy Argyrakis, indicating in a four star review from CCM Magazine, writes, "Special guest collaborators Trip Lee, FLAME, Derek Minor and Angie Rose add all the more star power and stylistic variety to this lively, coming of age collection that always keeps Christ at the center, even though it sounds right in step with any of today’s top pop stars." Awarding the album three and a half stars at New Release Today, Amanda Brogan-DeWilde states, "Throughout Young Dangerous Heart, V.Rose displays a beautiful blend of innocence and wisdom. She relates well to the young, but her message is ageless. And it's definitely one that people can dance to." Vanessa Cohn, rating the album a 78 out of 100 from Jesus Wired, writes, "Although some songs lack quality in lyrics and have the tendency to be repetitive, there are songs that stand out as anthems, songs with catchy beats, along with two worship tunes to make the album worth listening to. V. Rose is a leading vocalist in the CHH and pop genres and with this release it can be expected for her career to grow even more." Giving the album four and a half stars for 365 Days of Inspiring Media, Joshua Andre says, "Young Dangerous Heart has only proved the contrary- that V has only expanded her sound, and drawn in a whole lot more listeners. Which is great news as V. Rose continues to bring her vibrant and unique brand of music to the world.... these 45 minutes or so of pure pop CCM goodness is proof that she will be a star now and in the many years to come!"

== Track listing ==
No.	Title	Length
1.	"Take a Broken Heart" (featuring Derek Minor)	4:43
2.	"If I Don't Have Love"	3:10
3.	"Money$ on You" (featuring Flame)	3:35
4.	"I Love You So Much (ILYSM)" (featuring Trip Lee)	3:36
5.	"Fairy Tale Ending"	3:50
6.	"We're Girls" (featuring Angie Rose)	3:39
7.	"Love Shaped Heart"	3:10
8.	"Sinking Deep"	3:56
9.	"Storms"	3:20
10.	"Not Afraid of the Midnight"	3:31
11.	"Emotionful"	3:26
12.	"Bottom to the Top"	3:22
13.	"Young Dangerous Heart"	3:40
Total length:		46:58

== Chart performance ==
Chart (2016)	Peak position
US Top Christian Albums (Billboard)	31
US Heatseekers Albums (Billboard)	12
