= Tony Tillman =

American rapper

- Also known as: Brothatone, Tony Tillman
- Born: Tony Daniel Frazier; Camden, Arkansas
- Origin: Nashville, Tennessee
- Genres: Hip hop, Urban Contemporary
- Occupations: Singer, songwriter
- Instruments: vocals, singer-songwriter
- Years active: 2006–present
- Label: Reflection

Tony Daniel Frazier (born January 25, 1981), who goes by the stage name Tony Tillman or previously Brothatone, is an American Christian hip hop musician. As Brothatone, he released an EP in 2006, The Gift. As Tony Tillman, Mic Check was released by Reflection Music in 2013, and it is his breakthrough release on the Billboard charts. He followed it up with 2013's The Tillman EP that charted on two Billboard charts. His second studio album, Camden, charted on two Billboard magazine charts.

== Early life ==
Tony Tillman was born, Tony Daniel Frazier, on January 25, 1981, in Camden, Arkansas. Raised in a single-parent home, Tony Tillman was faced with many challenges urban youths face today. As a youth Tony joined the Crips but later left due to religious influence.

He began traveling with Seventh Day Slumber, and opening shows for several CCM and Hip-Hop artists. He has released two successful projects, and will soon release his first official studio album, called Camden, in summer 2015. The album is based on his previous gang involvement. Tillman currently serves with Fellowship Bible in Murfreesboro, Tennessee.

== Music career ==
Tony Tillman started making music in 2006 as Brothatone, releasing The Gift EP. Tony Tillman started using that moniker in 2012. He signed to Reflection Music and released, an album Mic Check and a follow-up EP The Tillman EP both in 2013 that charted on Billboard charts. His second studio album, Camden, was released on August 7, 2015, from Reflection Music Group. The album charted on two Billboard magazine charts, where it peaked at No. 25 on Christian Albums, and No. 19 on Heatseekers Albums.

== Discography ==
=== Studio albums ===
List of studio albums, with selected chart positions
Title	Album details	Peak chart positions		
Title	Album details	US Chr	US Gos	US Heat
Mic Check	Released: February 19, 2013; Label: Reflection Music; CD, digital download	–	25	–
Camden	Released: August 7, 2015; Label: Reflection Music; CD, digital download	10	–	8

=== EPs ===
List of studio albums, with selected chart positions
Title	EP details	Peak chart positions	
Title	EP details	US Chr	US Gos
The Tillman EP	Released: June 25, 2013; Label: Reflection Music; CD, digital download	38	19
