= B. Cooper =

American rapper

- Also known as: B. Cooper
- Born: Brad Alan Cooper; May 11, 1984 (age 42); Florence, Alabama
- Origin: Columbia, Tennessee
- Genres: Christian hip hop, urban contemporary gospel
- Occupations: Singer, songwriter
- Instrument: Vocals
- Years active: 2011–present
- Label: Reflection
- Website: iambcooper.com

Brad Alan "B." Cooper (born May 11, 1984) is an American Christian hip hop musician. His first album was Cashier of the Month in 2011. He released two albums in 2014 with Reflection Music, the first one did not chart was Spare Change, and the next While the City Sleeps was his breakthrough release on the Billboard charts. His fourth album, For the People, released in 2016, was a collaboration with Deraj.

== Early life ==
Brad Alan Cooper, was born in Florence, Alabama on May 11, 1984. He resides in Columbia, Tennessee.

== Music career ==
B. Cooper began making music at 15. In 2014, he signed a record deal with Reflection Music Group and released his second project with the label entitled Spare Change. The very same year his third album While the City Sleeps was released and it charted on three Billboard charts. His song "We On" (from his first album Cashier of the Month) has been featured in the soundtrack of the movie Unfriended.

== Discography ==
=== Studio albums ===
List of studio albums, with selected chart positions
Title	Album details	Peak chart positions		
Title	Album details	US Chr	US Gos	US Rap
Cashier of the Month (as B.C.)	Released: June 21, 2011; Label: Baby CD; CD, digital download	–	–	–
Spare Change	Released: February 6, 2014; Label: Reflection Music; CD, digital download	–	–	–
While the City Sleeps	Released: July 15, 2014; Label: Reflection Music; CD, digital download	28	8	24
For the People (in collaboration with Deraj)	Released: February 26, 2016; Label: Reflection Music; CD, digital download	–	–	–
