= Chad Jones (rapper) =

American rapper

- Also known as: Conviction
- Born: Chad Dorsey Jones; October 11, 1984 (age 41); Grand Rapids, Michigan
- Origin: Memphis, Tennessee, U.S.
- Genres: Christian hip hop, Urban contemporary gospel
- Occupations: Singer, songwriter
- Instruments: vocals, singer-songwriter
- Years active: 2008–present
- Label: Reflection
- Formerly of: R.M.G.

Chad Dorsey Jones (born October 11, 1984), who used to go by the stage name Conviction, is an American rapper. He released an EP in 2014 with Reflection Music, Keep Up, and it was his breakthrough release on the Billboard charts.

== Early life ==
Jones was born, Chad Dorsey Jones, on October 11, 1984, in Grand Rapids, Michigan. He resides in Memphis, Tennessee.

== Music career ==
Chad Jones started making music in 2008 as Conviction, yet in 2014 started using his real name Chad Jones, releasing Keep Up EP with Reflection Music., and it charted on three Billboard charts.

== Personal life ==
Chad Jones is married to Jeanine "Nene" Jones, and they have four children, residing in Memphis, Tennessee.

== Discography ==
=== EPs ===
List of studio albums, with selected chart positions
Title	EP details	Peak chart positions		
Title	EP details	US Chr	US Gos	US Heat
Keep Up EP	Released: April 29, 2014; Label: Reflection Music; CD, digital download	42	16	28
