= Deraj =

American rapper

- Also known as: Deraj
- Born: Jared Taylor Wells; August 20, 1987 (age 38)
- Genres: Christian hip hop, urban contemporary gospel
- Occupations: Singer, songwriter
- Instrument: Vocals
- Years active: 2006–present
- Label: Reflection

Jared Taylor Wells (born August 20, 1987), who goes by the stage name Deraj, is an American Christian hip hop musician. Mirrors & Medicine, his debut EP, was released by Reflection Music in 2014.

== Early life ==
Deraj was born Jared Taylor Wells, on August 20, 1987. He grew up in Maryland and Virginia.

== Personal life ==
He attended Full Sail University in Orlando, Florida.

== Music career ==
He started to make and pursue music as a career in 2006. Deraj is currently signed to Reflection Music Group. His first EP came out on February 24, 2014, Mirrors & Medicine. It charted on the Billboard Gospel Albums chart at No. 17.

== Discography ==
=== EPs ===
List of studio albums, with selected chart positions
Title	EP details	Peak chart positions
Title	EP details	US Gos
Mirrors & Medicine	Released: February 24, 2014; Label: Reflection Music; CD, digital download	17
For the People (in collaboration with B. Cooper)	Released: February 26, 2016; Label: Reflection Music; CD, digital download	–
