= Canon (rapper) =

American rapper

- Born: Aaron Marcellis McCain; March 1, 1989 (age 37); Chicago, Illinois
- Genres: Christian hip hop
- Occupation: Rapper
- Instrument: Vocals
- Years active: 2009–present
- Label: Reflection

Aaron Marcellis McCain (born March 1, 1989), better known by his stage name Canon, is an American Christian rapper from Chicago, Illinois. Canon is best known for his appearance on Lecrae's Rehab: The Overdose and his collaboration with Derek Minor then from Reach Records. Canon also was mentored by Lecrae who then took Canon on the road with him to be his full-time hype-man. After touring with Lecrae, Canon signed with Reflection Music Group and recorded his first EP entitled Loose Canon which was released in 2012. In 2014, Canon experience his first taste of success by reaching the Billboard 200 charts with the release of "Loose Canon, Volume 2." After a near-death accident, Canon was out for a long time, until 2016 when he released several singles and the third volume of his Loose Canon series.

== History ==
=== Early life ===
Aaron McCain was born in Chicago, Illinois on March 1, 1989, but was raised in Atlanta, Georgia. At the age of 13, McCain found himself in the middle of a terrible automobile accident. Being able to walk away from the accident unharmed let McCain realize how sensitive life really was. From this, he began to seek God and by the time he was in high school, he began rapping for him. After high school, McCain attended Bible College at Memphis where he met Derek Minor and Lecrae, who helped guide him into starting his music career.

=== 2009–present ===
After being mentored by Lecrae and Derek Minor, McCain began working on his first music project. His 2009 mixtape, The Great Investment, was McCain's first professional release. The reviews from the album made Canon an instant hit with fans across the globe. After the success of the mixtape, Canon appeared on Lecrae's Rehab: The Overdose album and other project from Reach Records. In 2011 Canon signed a music contract with record label Reflection Music Group, to which Minor was signed. McCain later released the EP, Loose Canon in 2012 and followed that renowned release with his first studio album Mad Haven in 2013. In 2014, McCain saw his first chart success with his album Loose Canon Vol. 2 which reached 101 on the Billboard 200.

Canon suffered a broken jaw, shattered ankle and a concussion from a fall down a ravine on December 20, 2014. Canon and his manager, Brandon Mason, had attempted to help someone who had crashed their car. As gasoline spread, the man inside tried to start the ignition; afraid it would blow up, Canon jumped over the guardrail, not seeing the ravine as it was dark. Some sources say he fell down a 20-foot (6.1 m) drop, whereas others (including Canon himself) say 40-foot (12 m). He has since recovered and has performed and released a few songs.

== Discography ==
=== Studio albums ===
List of studio albums, with selected chart positions
Title	Album details	Peak chart positions				
Title	Album details	US	US Chr	US Gos	US Ind	US Rap
Mad Haven	Released: October 15, 2013; Label: Reflection; CD, digital download	101	—	3	—	—
Loose Canon, Vol 3	Released: November 4, 2016; Label: Reflection; CD, digital download	—	—	—	—	—
Whole Team Winning	Released: July 22, 2019; Label: Reflection; CD, digital download	—	—	—	—	—

=== EPs ===
List of studio albums, with selected chart positions
Title	EP details	Peak chart positions				
Title	EP details	US	US Chr	US Gos	US Ind	US Rap
Loose Canon (EP): Volume 1	Released: October 16, 2012; Label: Reflection; CD, digital download	—	14	4	47	18
Loose Canon V2	Released: October 7, 2014; Label: Reflection; CD, digital download	—	6	2	17	9
