= Derek Minor =

American Christian hip hop artist

- Also known as: PRo
- Born: Derek Laurence Johnson Jr. December 16, 1984 (age 41); Pontiac, Michigan
- Origin: Middle Tennessee, United States
- Genre: Christian hip hop
- Occupations: Rapper; singer; songwriter; record producer; actor; screenwriter
- Years active: 2006–present
- Labels: Reflection; Reach; eOne; Scyon
- Website: derekminor.com

Derek Laurence Johnson Jr., better known by his stage name Derek Minor and former stage name PRo, (born December 16, 1984) is an American Christian rapper, singer, songwriter, record producer, entrepreneur, actor, and screenwriter. He co-founded the hip-hop record label Reflection Music Group (RMG) with Doc Watson, and signed to Reach Records in a joint venture between the two labels in 2011. In 2012, Johnson announced that he had changed his stage name from Pro to Derek Minor. In 2014, he announced that as his two-album contract with Reach was complete, he would no longer be publishing releases through that label.

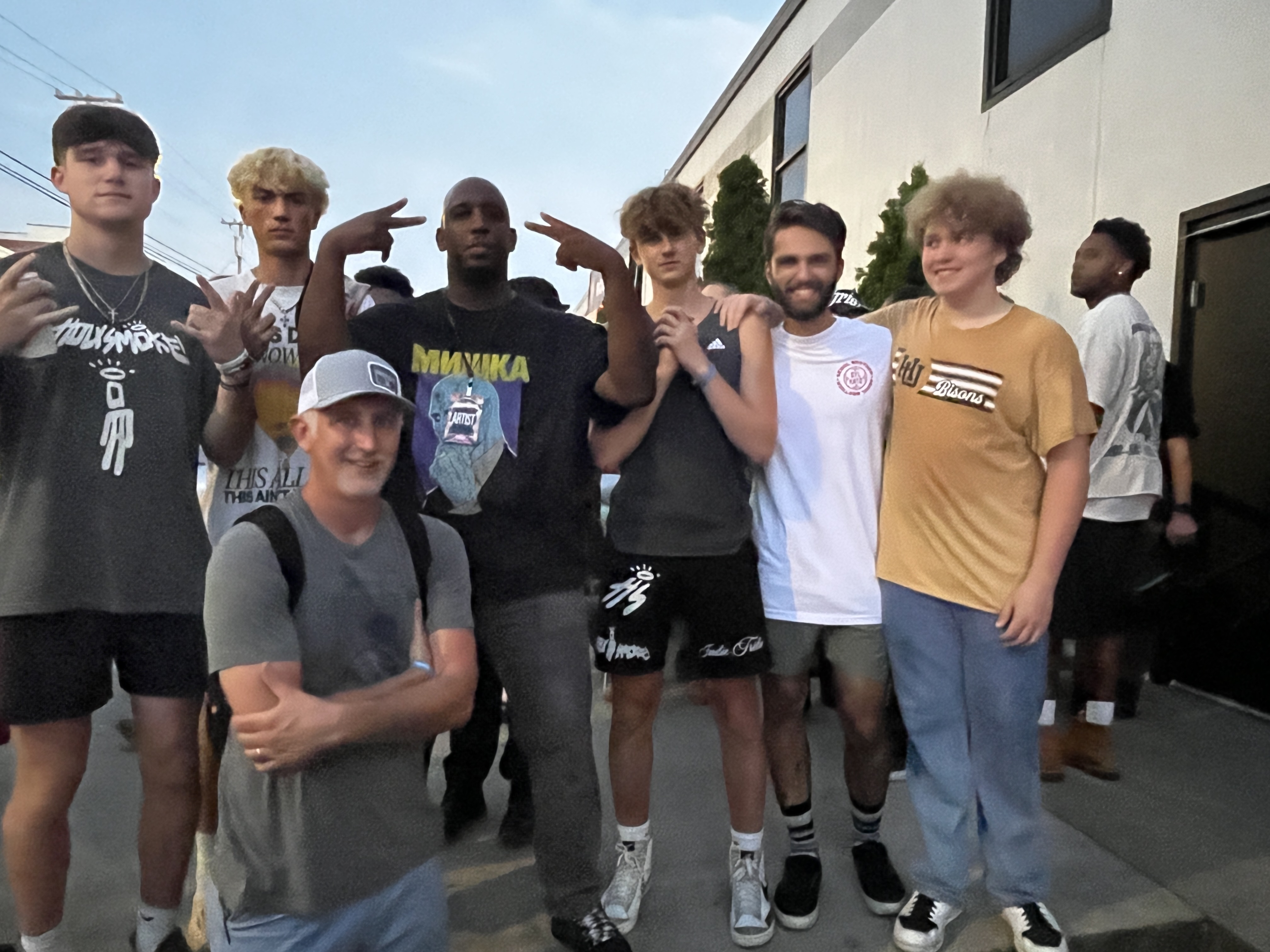
Derek Minor (center) poses with fans at Holy Smoke! 2025. Nashville, TN.

He is a founding member of the hip-hop group R.M.G. on Reflection, and was formerly a member of the Reach hip-hop collective 116 Clique. Johnson has released six studio albums and six mixtapes as a solo artist, as well as one studio album each with the groups R.M.G. and 116 Clique. His second studio album, Redemption, charted at No. 8 on the Billboard Gospel chart and No. 31 on the Billboard Top Christian chart. His third studio album, Dying to Live, debuted at No. 66 on the Billboard 200, No. 1 on the Top Christian chart, No. 2 on the Gospel Albums chart, No. 7 on the Top Independent Albums chart, and No. 11 on the Top Rap chart. His fourth album, Minorville, released in 2013 debuted at No. 5 on Billboard's Rap Albums chart and No. 7 on the Top Christian chart. He partnered with Entertainment One to release his fifth album, Empire, that debuted at No. 6 on the Billboard Rap Albums chart and No. 1 on the Top Christian chart. His sixth album, Reflection, entered the Billboard Rap Albums chart at No. 5 and the Top Christian chart at No. 7. Reflection's single "Change the World" featuring Hollyn reached No. 1 on Billboard's Hot AC/CHR chart.

Johnson's film and television work includes the three-part webseries "Dying to Live" and the short documentary films Redemption and Welcome to the Family Documentary. Johnson also was featured as the title character in the video game Altered Pro, released under Reach Records.

== Life and career ==
=== Early ===
Derek Johnson Jr. was born in Pontiac, Michigan on December 16, 1984, but at a young age relocated to Middle Tennessee with his mother. His relationship with his birth father was distant, and his relationship with his stepfather became increasingly tense. Furthermore, Johnson's stepfather was a drug user while his mother was a strict, devout Christian with a rigorous work schedule and homelife. Johnson decided to help his mother by becoming rich through either education or music.

Johnson had grown up with music, as Gospel songs were played at his house and his mother was in choir and sang around the city. Johnson's father, a jazz musician, provided the inspiration for him to go into music. When Johnson was 12, he visited his father in the summer and started rapping about God and adolescence, with his father producing beats with an Ensoniq ASR-10. Johnson was also introduced to DJ Quik that summer, and went home with piles of tapes.

After visiting to Middle Tennessee State University at age 15, Johnson decided to enroll in the music program there and make his ambitions a reality. His mother helped him by buying him production equipment, and by the time he entered college, Johnson was in a rap duo and got a job to pay for studio time. He graduated in 2006 with a bachelor's degree in Recording Industry Management. Johnson recalls that before he turned 21 he used a bunk bed as a mic stand and signed a record deal with an independent label. While on the label, he released a mix tape, but the company folded and his life took a turn for the worse. Removed from his strict home environment, Johnson rebelled. He pursued music, women and money until '"the season of death"' shook up his life. Within a short time span, Johnson lost his grandfather, grandmother and godmother. This loss sparked a realization of the fleeting nature of life, and Johnson decided to dedicate his life and talents to God.

=== Reflection Music Group (2008–2010) ===
Johnson co-founded Reflection Music Group, then-called Christ Like Entertainment, with his friend Doc Watson, whom he met while working on a second mixtape, Transformers. Johnson released his debut album The Blackout in 2008. According to DaSouth.com, the "braggidocious, swagtastic approach" that Johnson took on the album met with controversy in the Christian hip hop community. Johnson took a break from rapping, and was challenged and influenced by a new friend, BJ, that he met at his new church in Memphis, Tennessee, and was further challenged by Christian hip-hop artist Lecrae. Johnson reflected that his first album was mostly about haters and how good an emcee he was, and was convinced that it should have been more focused on God. In January 2010, Johnson released the mixtape PSA, which he considers his first full-length installment of "mature" Christian music. That year, Johnson went on the "Urban Missionary Tour" with Thi'sl, k-Drama, and J'Son, including a stop in the United Kingdom. In preparation for his second studio album, Redemption, Johnson wrote a short autobiographical film entitled "Redemption", and it was released as a web film in May. The album Redemption was released July 13, 2010, and peaked at No. 8 on the Billboard Top Gospel Albums and No. 31 on the Top Christian Albums charts. This release was followed by an announcement in August that Johnson would be featured as a special guest on the 116 Clique "Unashamed 2010" tour, which ran October through November. Also in August, Johnson received a write-up in Jet and was featured on the front page of the magazine's website.

=== Reach Records and name change (2011–2013) ===
On January 25, 2011, Reach Records announced that it had signed Johnson as a joint venture with Reflection Music Group, and the same day Johnson released the single "116", featuring KB. On March 8, Johnson released the mixtape PSA: Vol. 2. On July 10, Johnson announced the launch of a three-part webseries "Dying to Live" to promote his upcoming studio album of the same name. In the months of August and October, Pro toured with 116 Clique as part of the group's "Man Up" campaign. On August 9, Reach Records released the web game Altered Pro, a zombie game based on the Sega classic Altered Beast. The full-length studio album, Dying to Live, was released on August 23. The album debuted at No. 1 on the Christian Albums chart, No. 2 on the Gospel Albums chart, No. 7 on the Independent Albums, No. 11 on the Rap Albums chart and No. 66 on the Billboard 200. The album was also the featured banner on the iTunes homepage as well in the Christian & Religious and Hip Hop/Rap departments. In September, Johnson performed at the 2011 Flavor Fest, and on September 27, 2011, the album Man Up by 116 Clique was released. In October, Johnson was included with Braille and 116 Clique as some of the artists in the iTunes Indie Spotlight for hip hop music.

In February 2012, Reflection Music Group announced the formation of the hip-hop group R.M.G., consisting of the artists Pro, Canon, Tony Tillman (formerly known as Brothatone), and Chad Jones (formerly known as Conviction). With this announcement came the release of R.M.G.'s debut single "Geeked Up" on February 21. On March 21, the group released an online documentary film entitled "Welcome to the Family Documentary" in preparation for its debut album Welcome to the Family, which was released March 27.

On March 17, 2012, Johnson performed at the 2012 South by Southwest festival as part of the Reach Records showcase along with Lecrae, Trip Lee, Tedashii, Andy Mineo, and KB. On August 6, 2012, Johnson revealed the cover art for his upcoming mixtape, PSA Vol. 3: Who Is Derek Minor?, and with it revealed that he had changed his stage name from Pro to Derek Minor. From October through November, Johnson toured with 116 Clique on the "Unashamed 2012: Come Alive" tour. On November 8, 2012, South by Southwest announced that Reach Records would again hold a showcase with its entire roster, including Derek Minor, in 2013.

In an interview with Rapzilla on May 5, 2013, Kyle Dettman, video director for Reach Records, revealed that Reach Records is preparing promotional material for Derek Minor's upcoming album Minorville. On June 6, 2013, Minor released a lyric video for a single from Minorville, "Dear Mr. Christian" featuring Dee-1 and Lecrae, followed by an actual release of the single the next day. Later, on June 21, Reach Records released the album cover for Minorville by a video showing the album cover making-process, and also announced the release date, September 10, 2013. The promotion for the album continued on July 2, when Minor dropped a teaser video for a track called "In God We Trust" featuring Thi'sl. The album debuted at No. 40 on the Billboard 200, No. 1 on the Gospel Albums Chart, No. 2 on the Christian Albums Chart, No. 6 on the Independent Albums Chart and No. 6 on the Rap Albums Chart, making it his best chart performing album to date.

On March 18, 2014, Rapzilla announced that Derek Minor had parted ways with Reach Records, as his two-album contract with Reach had expired. Minor was quoted, "I've grown as an artist, business owner and a man. The beauty of the relationship we've established is that business wasn't its primary agenda and I'm excited to see what the future holds for both RMG and Reach."

=== Independent route and distribution deals (2014–present) ===
In October 2014 at the Dove Awards he announced that his fifth album will be titled Empire and will be released in the first quarter of 2015. On October 22, 2014, it was announced that Derek Minor had signed a distribution deal with Entertainment One. The first single off the album "Who You Know" was released on November 14, 2014. The second single "Party People" featuring Social Club was released on December 9, 2014. Empire was released on January 27, 2015. The album debuted at No. 54 on the Billboard 200.

On July 29, 2016, he announced that he would be releasing his sixth studio album, Reflection, on October 14, 2016. A few days later he released a free EP, 1014, to those who pre-ordered the album. Reflection debuted at No. 7 on the Billboard Christian Albums chart, No. 5 on the Rap Albums chart, and No. 15 on the Independent Albums chart. His music video for Reflection album cut "Until I'm Gone" featuring B.J. the Chicago Kid premiered on Billboard.com. The visual for "Look at Me Now" premiered on BET.com.

In February 2017, his song "Change the World" featuring Hollyn reached No. 1 on Billboard's Hot AC/CHR chart. That same month, Minor embarked on the Rock and Worship Roadshow with Steven Curtis Chapman, Francesca Battistelli, Rend Collective, Passion and others. In the spring of 2017, broadcast of the We Love Christian Music Awards, Minor's Reflection album received the Rap/Urban Album of the Year honor.

His next installment of music was the Up and Away series, which featured four projects: the EPs Your Soul Must Fly and High Above, which were released in the late 2017, and two full-length albums The Trap and By Any Means, which were released in 2018. The titles form a sentence, "Your soul must fly high above the trap by any means".

== Discography ==
- The Blackout (2008)
- Redemption (2010)
- Dying to Live (2011)
- Minorville (2013)
- Empire (2015)
- Reflection (2016)
- The Trap (2018)

== Filmography ==
=== Short films ===
Year	Film	Director	Producer	Writer	Actor	Notes
2010	Redemption	—N/a	—N/a	Yes	Yes	Web film
2012	Welcome to the Family Documentary	No	—N/a	Yes	Yes	Documentary web film
2013	Everything Must Go	No	No	No	Yes	Documentary web film

=== Webseries ===
Year	Program	Credit	Notes
2011	Dying to Live	Writer, actor	3-part promotional series

=== Video games ===
Year	Title	Role	Notes
2011	Altered Pro	Himself	Voice-only

== Awards and nominations ==
GMA Dove Awards

A Dove Award is an accolade by the Gospel Music Association (GMA) of the United States to recognize outstanding achievement in the Christian music industry.

Year	Nominee/work	Award	Result	Ref.
2014	"Dear Mr. Christian" (featuring Dee-1 and Lecrae)	Rap/Hip Hop Recorded Song of the Year	Nominated	
2014	Minorville	Rap/Hip Hop Album of the Year	Won	
2016	"No Quit"	Rap/Hip Hop Recorded Song of the Year	Nominated	

Grammy Awards

A Grammy Award is an honor awarded by The Recording Academy to recognize outstanding achievement in the mainly English-language music industry.

Year	Nominee/work	Award	Result	Ref.
2013	Gravity (as producer)	Best Gospel Album	Won	

Stellar Awards

The Stellar Awards is a Gospel Music Awards in the U.S., honoring Gospel Music artists, writers, and industry professionals.

Year	Nominee/work	Award	Result	Ref.
2015	Anomaly (as producer)	Rap Hip Hop Gospel CD of the Year	Won	
2016	Empire	Rap Hip Hop Gospel CD of the Year	Won	
