= Back to Dust =

2007 album by Sev Statik and DJ Dust

Studio album by Sev Statik and DJ Dust
- Released: October 9, 2007
- Recorded: 2006–2007
- Studios: Backwater Studios; Mother Of Invention Studios; New England Recording Company
- Genres: Alternative hip hop, Christian hip hop, underground hip hop
- Length: 63:02
- Label: Rawkus
- Producer: DJ Dust

Sev Statik chronology
| Sliver LP (2007) | Back to Dust (2007) | Shotgun (2008) |

DJ Dust chronology
| Dust Collecting Volume One (2007) | Back to Dust (2007) |

Back to Dust is a studio album by Albany, New York-based rapper Sev Statik and Atlanta-based producer DJ Dust, originally released on October 9, 2007, through Rawkus Records. It was the fourth studio release by Sev Statik and the second studio release for DJ Dust. Back to Dust features numerous guest appearances, including Manchild and Playdough of Deepspace5, Theory Hazit, Supastition, LMNO of The Visionaries, and Raphi, Griffin, and Triune of Tunnel Rats. The album was selected by Rawkus for inclusion in its "Rawkus 50" promotional campaign, and was released as a digital download. A physical version of the album was released on July 7, 2008, through Braille's Hip Hop IS Music label. Back to Dust met with critical acclaim. In 2010, Theory Hazit released a remixed version of the album.

== Background ==
Sev Statik was active as a rapper in the Albany area since the early 1990s. After released two EPs in 1996, in 1997 he co-founded the supergroup Deepspace5 and joined the West Coast hip hop collective Tunnel Rats. In 2002, Sev Statik released his debut studio album, Speak Life. Two more studio recordings followed: Slow Burn in 2005 and Sliver LP in 2007.

DJ Dust was active as a DJ for the group Indianapolis group deadpoetsociety during the mid-1990s. In 1998, while at a conference, he met Manchild, a member of The Pride and a co-founder of Deepspace5. The two founded the project Mars Ill, and DJ Dust also joined the Deepspace5 collective. DJ Dust released a solo album, No Fame, in 2006.

== Release ==
Back to Dust was first released on October 9, 2007, through Rawkus Records. The album was selected by the label as part of its Rawkus 50 campaign, a program in which fifty hip hop artists were selected from submissions to the label. Following the October 9 release date, the album was uploaded to iTunes on October 16. Sev Statik and DJ Dust also partnered with the rapper Braille's Hip Hop IS Music to release a digipak version of the album. This version came out the following year on July 7.

== Style and lyrics ==
The album was described falling within alternative and underground forms of Christian hip hop. Christianity Today found the style similar to that of Mars Ill, Deepspace5, Tunnel Rats, and LPG. The production uses a diverse assortment of musical elements, including jazz-style piano, frenetic drum kits, soulful vocals, harpsichord licks, and spoken word and a cappella passages. DJ Dust also made extensive examples of mid- to late-1990s rock, jazz, and blues, as well as excerpts of preaching. While some tracks featured complex layers of soundscapes, others are very minimalistic and simple in their construction.

The title of the recording, Back to Dust, is a reference to Genesis 3:19, where God reminds Adam that he will return to dust upon his death. Working from this theme, Sev Statik approaches a diversity of interconnected topics, such as mass media brainwashing and family problems, but highlights life, death, and creation throughout.

== Reception ==
Professional ratings
Review scores
| Source | Rating |
|---|---|
| Christianity Today | 4.5/5 stars |
| The Phantom Tollbooth | 5/5 stars |

Back to Dust was critically acclaimed upon its released. Christianity Today awarded the album four-and-a-half stars out of five, calling it "Alternative rap at its finest." The reviewer, Andree Farias, said that he was hard pressed to single out any favorites, as "Cut after cut, bar after bar, the tandem offers some of the most redemptive hip-hop the Christian scene has seen in recent memory." He did caveat that the appeal of the album might not be immediate, as it needs to be taken in and savored slowly.

Jerry Bolton of The Phantom Tollbooth gave the album a perfect score of five stars, exclaiming that "Back To Dust, quite simply, is so good that I couldn't believe my ears. It took a month of regular rotation to quiet my cynicism and fully agree with my initial feeling: this is the best collection of beats & rhymes this year."

== Track listing ==
| No. | Title | Length |
|---|---|---|
| 1. | "Altitude" | 4:25 |
| 2. | "The Gods" | 3:14 |
| 3. | "Put'cha Name On It" (featuring Supastition) | 5:53 |
| 4. | "Steamroller" | 4:07 |
| 5. | "Far Cry" (featuring Elias) | 4:13 |
| 6. | "Signature" | 4:01 |
| 7. | "No 2 Ways" (featuring Cas Metah, Griffin, Motion Plus, Relic, and Triune) | 5:21 |
| 8. | "Back to Dust" | 3:47 |
| 9. | "Walk Alone" (featuring Manchild and Playdough) | 4:09 |
| 10. | "Let It Go" (featuring LMNO) | 5:21 |
| 11. | "Unborn" (featuring Elias) | 5:15 |
| 12. | "Day Break" | 3:50 |
| 13. | "You May Be Right" (featuring Raphi and Theory Hazit) | 3:21 |
| 14. | "Gone" (featuring Lady Dubb) | 6:05 |

== Remixed version ==
Back to Dust: Remixed

Remix album by Sev Statik and Theory Hazit
- Released: June 29, 2010
- Genres: Christian hip hop, underground hip hop
- Length: 39:05
- Label: Point Man
- Producers: DJ Dust, Theory Hazit

Sev Statik chronology
| School Shooting (2010) | Back to Dust: Remixed (2010) | Sondial (2011) |

Theory Hazit chronology
| Determined to Fly (2010) | Back to Dust: Remixed (2010) | The Rock is Steady (2011) |

On May 29, 2010, Sev Statik released a version of the album remixed by Theory Hazit. Originally, Sev Statik's fellow Tunnel Rats member Dert was scheduled to release the album.

=== Track listing ===
| No. | Title | Length |
|---|---|---|
| 1. | "Altitude" | 4:43 |
| 2. | "Day Break" | 3:37 |
| 3. | "No 2 Ways" (featuring Triune, MotionPlus, Cas Metah, and Relic) | 5:51 |
| 4. | "Walk Alone" (featuring Manchild and Playdough) | 3:33 |
| 5. | "Far Cry" (featuring Elias) | 4:23 |
| 6. | "Let It Go" (featuring LMNO) | 3:21 |
| 7. | "Signature" | 2:42 |
| 8. | "Steamroller" | 3:47 |
| 9. | "The Godz" | 3:10 |
| 10. | "Back to Dust" | 4:20 |
