= Speak Life =

Studio album by Sev Statik
- Released: November 9, 2002
- Recorded: 1999–2001
- Genre: Christian hip hop, East Coast hip hop
- Length: 63:59
- Label: UpRok, EMI
- Producer: Dave Santos, Dert, DJ Cheapshot, DJ N8 da Great, Peace 586

Sev Statik chronology
| Severed Remaynz (2002) | Speak Life (2002) | Nephilim: Act of God 1 (2003) |

Speak Life is the debut studio album by Albany, New York-based hip hop musician Sev Statik, released on November 9, 2002, through Uprok Records. While Sev Statik, real name Joseph Evans, had released a previous studio album, Altered State, in 2001 under the moniker "Stu Dent", Speak Life is considered his debut. Sev Statik had recently joined to the hip hop collective Tunnel Rats, and the release features several artists from that group. It also features Listener from Deepspace5, another collective of which Sev Statik is part. Speak Life marks the debut appearance of Propaganda, who would join Tunnel Rats the following year. The album garnered a mixed response from critics, receiving praise for its positive lyrics, East Coast sound and use of sampling, but criticized for its lack of innovation and inconsistency in overall quality.

== Background, recording, and release ==
Sev Statik, real name Joseph Evans, began performing hip hop music in the Albany area during the early 1990s. From 1993 through 1996, he recorded and performed with the group Master Plan. Following that group's dissolution, he released two EPs. In 1997, he formed the supergroup Deepspace5 with Manchild, Recon, Sintax the Terrific, and Listener. That same year, he also joined the Los Angeles-based collective Tunnel Rats.

Evans began recording material for Speak Life in 1999, but had to abandon the project due to conflicts he and Tunnel Rats had with their label. Evans also had made an agreement with Tunnel Rats not to release any material as "Sev Statik" until after Tunnel Rats released its next studio album. Instead of Speak Life, he recorded a different album, Altered State, under the name Stu Dent, and released that in 2001. The same year, Tunnel Rats released Tunnel Vision. Evans then re-recorded Speak Life from scratch. He explained later that he "would've just used the lyrics from the last album, but I didn't keep any of the raps or get a chance to memorize any songs. It was such a short time to do the record I would read the lyrics out my notebook as I recorded." The resulting debut album was released in 2002 through Uprok Records and EMI. Evans has expressed some disappointment with the final song selection as decided on by the label, but concedes that the release did increase his national exposure, and that he got to work with some of the "freshest" producers.

== Reception ==
Professional ratings
Review scores
| Source | Rating |
|---|---|
| Cross Rhythms | 6/10 stars |
| RapReviews.com | 6.5/10 |

Speak Life met with a mixed critical reception. RapReviews.com rated the album six-point-five out of ten, praising the positive message of the lyrics and the well-balanced mix of upbeat and meditative tracks. However, the website found that Sev Statik comes across as "too self-centered without revealing much about its author", and that some songs – Da Pointman", "Rock of Ages", and "Global" – did not match up to the quality of the rest of the album. Cross Rhythms rated the album six out of ten, praising the "cross section of sounds ranging from earthy, sample-based, rugged, east coast, clubbin', abstract and weird" and Sev Statik's sensitive and insightful take on spiritual and social problems, but also criticizing the album for inconsistency and a lack of depth.

Jon Corbin of cMusicWeb was generally favorable to the album, though noted some flaws. He gave high praise to the varied production on the album, and noted that while a solo project, Speak Life still has a very strong Tunnel Rats feel. He also praised Sev Statik's lyrics, which address topics such as hip hop culture and contemporary politics. However, Corbin also felt that more members from Deepspace5 should have contributed to the album, and that the hooks to several songs were weak. Gospel Flava was positive overall, noting Speak Life's sonic range from "earthy, sample-based" tracks to East Coast-style tune, and concluding that on Speak Life, Sev Statik "steps into something new, defying the law of gravity with slow motion, high flying verbal acrobatics."

== Track listing ==
| No. | Title | Writer(s) | Producer(s) | Length |
|---|---|---|---|---|
| 1. | "Intro" | | | 1:01 |
| 2. | "All for a Purpose" | Donald Baker | Dert | 3:56 |
| 3. | "Warning" (featuring Dokument, Propaganda, and Raphi) | Jason Petty, David Silva Santos | Dave Santos | 3:24 |
| 4. | "Over the Influence" | Colton Fisher | DJ Cheapshot | 4:12 |
| 5. | "Da Pointman" | Baker | Dert | 4:06 |
| 6. | "Meds" | Rene Vasquez | Peace 586 | 3:45 |
| 7. | "Disappear" | Santos | Dave Santos | 1:41 |
| 8. | "Speak Life" (featuring Dax) | Baker, Dax Reynosa | Dert | 3:36 |
| 9. | "I Apologize" (featuring Listener) | Santos | Dave Santos | 3:54 |
| 10. | "Poor Penmenship" | Baker | Dert | 3:43 |
| 11. | "Seasons of a Tear" (featuring Elsie and Zane One) | Baker | Dert | 4:15 |
| 12. | "Statik Interlude" (performed by DJ N8 da Great) | | DJ N8 da Great | 0:44 |
| 13. | "Right Now" (featuring Macho and Raphi) | Baker, Rosario "Macho" Ortega | Dert | 3:28 |
| 14. | "Rock of Ages" (featuring Raphi) | Baker | Dert | 3:51 |
| 15. | "End Up" (featuring Macho and Raphi) | Baker, Ortega | Dert | 3:21 |
| 16. | "Invisible Bars" | Santos | Dave Santos | 3:23 |
| 17. | "Close" | Fisher | DJ Cheapshot | 4:24 |
| 18. | "Global" (featuring LPG) | Baker, Reynosa | Dert | 3:41 |
| 19. | "MIC" | Baker | Dert | 3:34 |
