= Tunnel Rats discography =

- Studio albums: 4
- Compilation albums: 1
- Music videos: 1
- Guest appearances: 1
- Compilation appearances: 4
- Miscellaneous: 1

The combined discography of Tunnel Rats, a West Coast underground Christian hip hop collective founded in 1993 in Whittier, California, is three studio albums, a collaborative compilation album, several compilation appearances, one guest appearance, one music video, and a collection of unfinished material. Named after the tunnel rats in the Vietnam War, the mixed-gender, multi-racial collective has included twenty individual members and incorporated six affiliated groups: LPG, Future Shock, Footsoldiers, the Foundation, New Breed, and the Resistance, which have recorded both within Tunnel Rats and independently. The collective has released three albums under the Tunnel Rats name: Experience (1996), Tunnel Vision (2001), and Tunnel Rats (2004). They also collaborated on a compilation album released through Uprock Records, Underground Rise, Volume 1: Sunrise/Sunset (2003). Though currently on hiatus, Tunnel Rats has not disbanded, according to a statement by member Peace 586. The Tunnel Rats released their fourth studio album, Legacy, on July 11, 2025. Largely produced by Peace 586 and Daniel Steele, it was released via Peace 586's Bandcamp page as a digital album, accompanied by a limited number of vinyl copies for purchase.

== Studio albums ==
List of studio albums
Title	Album details
Experience	1st studio album; Released: May 3, 1996; Label: Brainstorm
Tunnel Vision	2nd studio album; Released: October 25, 2001
Tunnel Rats	3rd studio album; Released: March 3, 2004; Label: UpRok
Legacy	4th studio album; Released: July 11, 2025; Label: Independent

== Compilation albums ==
List of compilation albums
Title	Album details
Coalition: the Hip-Hop Alliance	Released: 2000; Label: ForeFront
Uprock Records Sampler	Released: January 29, 2002
Uprock Mixtape, Vol. 1	Released: November 19, 2002; Label: UpRok; Host: DJ Allstar
Underground Rise, Volume 1: Sunrise/Sunset	Released: April 25, 2003; Label: UpRok
Uprock Mixtape, Vol. 2	Released: October 7, 2003; Label: UpRok; Host: DJ Allstar

== Guest appearances ==
List of guest appearances
Title	Year	Other performer(s)	Album
"What's Real"	2002	BK & Associates	BK & Associates

== Music videos ==
Title	Year	Director
"T.R.'z"	2001	—

== Miscellaneous ==
Title	Album details
Both Sides	Compilation of unfinished material; Released: October 5, 2005; Label: Thump
