= Group Therapy (Sivion album) =

Studio album by Sivion
- Released: October 15, 2013
- Genre: Boom bap, Christian hip hop, underground hip hop, neo soul
- Length: 66:21
- Label: Illect
- Producer: The Are, Courtland Urbano, Dert, Freddie Bruno, Harry Krum, Izzy the Kidd, Tha Kracken!, M Slago, PICNICTYME, Sebmaestria, Sojourn, (S1), Theory Hazit, Thought P

Sivion chronology
Butterfly Sessions (2010)	Group Therapy (2013)	Dark Side of the Cocoon (2018)

Group Therapy is the fourth studio album by Dallas-based Christian hip hop artist Sivion. It features guest appearances by 26 other artists, including Manchild, Sintax the Terrific, Ozay Moore, Sareem Poems, Propaganda, Jurny Big, Zane, Macho, DJ Aslan, and Shames Worthy. Released on October 15, 2013, through Illect Recordings, it was met with a mixed reception from critics.

== Background ==
Sivion began his hip-hop career in 1990. He formed the project Phat K.A.T.S. with his brother and took on the moniker Vision. He later changed this stage name to Sivion. He joined the Christian hip hop collective Deepspace5 in the early 2000s and released first his solo recording, Mood Enhancement, released through Illect Recordings. A second album, Spring Of The Songbird, released the following year (2006) on Hip Hop IS Music. He collaborated with the producer Dert for his third album, Butterfly Sessions, released in 2010.

== Concept and album cover ==
Sivion described Group Therapy as a "guest album", because of the multitude of guest artists on the album, almost thirty features. Sivion's day job in the healthcare staffing industry made him familiar with the term "group therapy", which he opted to use as the number of guest features on the album increased. The concept behind this title is that the group of Christians coming to the rescue of non-Christians. This also inspired the album cover, which features the various guest artists as superheroes. Sivion says that "All these superheroes are trying to figure out what it is about this guy that makes him have superpowers when he’s not a superhero." Sivion says that the point of this is that God is the source of his power, and God is greater than anything else. The cover depicts, clockwise from top left: Sintax the Terrific, Propaganda, Zane One, Wushu, Sivion, Krum, Eimi Hall, Sareem Poems, Manchild, Heather James, and Freddie Bruno. Lamar Gibbs from Jam the Hype! in their review of the album said that the content of the album itself did not communicate the concept, but the list of features and producers in the track listing made them clear.

== Release and reception ==
Professional ratings
Review scores
Source	Rating
Cross Rhythms	8/10 stars
Jesus Freak Hideout	3/5 stars
New Release Today	4/5 stars
RapReviews.com	6.5/10

Group Therapy was released on October 15, 2013. It met with a generally positive reception from critics. Cross Rhythms reviewer James Moss rated the album eight out of ten, summarizing it as a "well above average album." In particular he singled out "Ladies and Gentlemen", "Real Talk", "The Best", and "One Two". Dwayne Lacy of New Release Today gave the album four out of five stars, praising the upbeat, party-style of the album and highlighting the songs "Ladies and Gentleman", "Ask the Deejay", "Out to Win", and "One Two". Grant Jones from RapReviews rated the album 6.5 out of 10, praising the production values of several of the songs but expressing some puzzlement at the choice by Sivion include so many guest features, as Sivion's own talent tends to be drowned out by the presence of so many other rappers. Jones identifies "One Two," "The Best", "Ladies and Gentleman", "Watch Out", "Honey Dew", "Let's Grow", and "Dub Season" as standout tracks. Kevin Hoskins from Jesus Freak Hideout rated the album three stars out of five. They favored the tracks "Real Talk", "Out to Win", "We Got What You Want," "To The Rescue," and "Ask The Deejay," found the tracks "Ladies and Gentleman", "Watch Out", and "The Best" as fairly standard, and they disliked "One Two" and "Can't Stop Us". Stephen Maddox from Sphere of Hip Hop was highly favorable to the album, expressing that "honestly all the tracks and collabs are on point." They noted that the record might be too boom bap for some, but should be appreciated for its lyricism, vocal collaborations, and production values. Maddox particularly liked "Watch Out", "We Got What You Want", and "Ask the Deejay", and singled out "Dub Season" as the record's "magnum opus." Jamar Gibbs of Jam the Hype! opined that the album would best appeal to fans of boom bap, and summarized that "while this album doesn’t necessarily stand out as big as I’d hoped, Sivion has brought an acceptable offering of good music." They listed "Ladies and Gentleman", "Watch Out", "Free Your Soul", "We Got What You Want", and “One Two” as some of the best songs on the album.

== Genre ==
The album was described as underground hip hop, boom bap, and neo soul. New Release Tuesday described the album as featuring a "party" style of hip hop. RapReviews noted a general feel of positivity throughout the record. Cross Rhythms described "Real Talk" as "acoustic hip hop" with a "Motown-tinged jazz groove". The sample at the start of "The Best" Cross Rhythms describes as sounding like a country singer, and "One Two" features R&B singer Heather James. Sphere of Hip Hop described "Dub Season" as "an interpretation of a classic jungle brothers drum loop, laden with boom bap loveliness".

== Tracklisting ==
No.	Title	Producer	Length
1.	"Ladies and Gentlemen" (featuring DJ Aslan)	The Are	3:55
2.	"Real Talk" (featuring muzeONE, Jurny Big, and DJ Sean P)	Harry Krum	3:41
3.	"Out to Win" (featuring Macho and Manchild)	Freddie Bruno	3:38
4.	"Watch Out" (featuring Shames Worthy and Zane One)	PICNICTYME	3:49
5.	"The Best" (featuring DJ Manwell)	Symbolyc One (S1)	4:09
6.	"Free Your Soul" (featuring Sojourn and Ahred Strange Indeed)	Sojourn	3:41
7.	"Honey Dew" (featuring DJ Sean P)	Theory Hazit	3:57
8.	"Let's Grow" (featuring Eimi Hall and Drue Mitchell)	Dert	4:03
9.	"We Got What You Want" (featuring Propaganda, Sareem Poems, and Crystal Cameron)	Thought P	4:05
10.	"Telecom" (featuring Ozay Moore and DJ Idull)	Courtland Urbano	3:50
11.	"To the Rescue" (featuring Sintax the Terrific)	Freddie Bruno	3:55
12.	"One Two" (featuring Heather James)	Sebmaestria	3:33
13.	"Walking Bassline"	Theory Hazit	1:35
14.	"Ask the DeeJay" (featuring Ruslan, Kaboose, and Crystal Cameron)	Tha Kracken!	4:20
15.	"Can't Stop Us" (featuring Tia Adams & Yung Rick)	Izzy the Kidd	4:17
16.	"Dub Season" (featuring DFW’s Finest)	M Slago	9:53
Total length:			66:21

- Cuts: 1. DJ Aslan; 2. & 7. DJ Sean P; 5. DJ Manwell; 8. Drue Mitchell; 10. DJ Idull
