= Zane One =

Rapper and fashion accessory designer from Whittier, California

- Born: Zane Marie Reynosa; March 18, 1975 (age 50)
- Other names: Zane, Zane Marie
- Occupations: Rapper, fashion accessory designer
- Relatives: Dax Reynosa (brother); Jurny Big (cousin)
- Musical career
- Origin: Whittier, California
- Genres: Battle rap, Christian hip hop, underground hip hop, West Coast hip hop
- Years active: 1989–present
- Labels: AudioSketchBook, Brainstorm, End of Earth, Uprok
- Member of: Saturday Night Freestyle, Tunnel Rats
- Website: zanemarie.storenvy.com zaneone.bandcamp.com

Zane Marie Reynosa (born March 18, 1975), known by the stage names Zane and Zane One as well as the names Zane Marie, is an American rapper and fashion accessory designer from Whittier, California. She joined the pioneering Christian underground hip hop collective Tunnel Rats in 1993, which was formed by her brother, Dax Reynosa, and recorded three studio albums and a compilation with the group. She also founded the band Saturday Night Freestyle. She has featured on numerous songs and in 2008 released a solo studio album, L.A. Woman. She was active for years as a battle rapper in the Los Angeles scene and was featured in the 2004 documentary The Battle for L.A.: Footsoldiers, Vol. 1, directed by Darren Doane. She also created a fashion line, Zane Marie Bags, specializing in vintage handbags, luggage, wallets, and rhyme books.

== Biography ==
Reynosa wrote her first rap at age 15. She began her career in hip hop music in 1989, learning from her brother Dax and her cousin Jurny Big who had formed a Christian hip hop group called LPG in 1984. In a 2009 interview, she cited MC Lyte as the reason that she started rapping. When asked about which album reminds her why she fell in love with hip hop, Reynosa cited Innercity Griots by Freestyle Fellowship. She clarified that she does not really listen to much hip hop music and instead prefers folk music and "old hippie stuff." She considers Jurny Big to be her favorite emcee.

In 1993, Dax held an open mic at his home in Whittier. Among the performers was his sister Zane, and she became one of the first members of the collective Tunnel Rats, touring extensively with them in the Western and Southern United States. Tunnel Rats released their first album, Experience, in 1996. The same year she featured on The Risen Son, a studio release by fellow Tunnel Rats member Peace 586. In 1998, she guested on the LPG album 360 Degrees. Reynosa frequented venues in the Los Angeles hip hop underground such as Project Blowed, Good Life Cafe, and Unity. According to Rapzilla, she became known for being "absolutely vicious on the mic" and was one of the first "raw and elite" women that a male-dominated industry respected. The nickname "Zane One" started as her tag when she contributed to graffiti sketchbooks. Around the year 2001, she founded an eight-member live band, Saturday Night Freestyle, that remained active for the next six years and made an appearance on Generations (2003) by Peace 586.

Reynosa recorded two more studio albums — 2001's Tunnel Vision and 2004's Tunnel Rats — as well as compilation album — Underground Rise, Volume 1: Sunrise/Sunset (2003) — with Tunnel Rats. She also appeared the 2002 album Cali Quake, the debut release from Tunnel Rats member Raphi. The 2004 documentary The Battle for L.A. portrayed the Los Angeles battle rap scene and includes footage of Reynosa. In 2005, she guested on the extended play Freedom by Tunnel Rats and New Breed member Macho. In 2009, she released her debut studio album as a solo artist, L.A. Woman, taking inspiration for the title from the Doors album of the same name. Lyrically, the album explored topics of faith, womanhood, and living as a single mother. Reynosa explained that making the album was delayed for years due to various hardships. She dedicated the album to her grandmother. Propaganda, a fellow Tunnel Rats member, assisted her in finalizing and releasing the album. In 2008 she also appeared on Propaganda's album Listen Watch Focus, as well as the album Let'emknow by LMNO. In 2009, she featured on Peace 586's album Hear and also on a remix extended play from Fol Chen, The Longer U Wait.

Reynosa launched her fashion line, Zane Marie Bags (originally Zane One Bags), in the early 2010s after eight years of practice and twelve years after she first started selling crochet at various music festivals, clubs, and poetry venues. A music video for the track "Zane One (L.A. Woman)" from her debut album was released in 2010, followed up by a single of the same title. In 2011 she contributed to Macho's album Remember, and this track was remixed two years later by producer Sundance. In 2013, she appeared on Group Therapy by Sivion. She featured on the LA Symphony album You Still On Earth? in 2014, and in 2019 featured on the album Here's Mud in Your Eye by Krum and Theory Hazit.

== Discography ==
- L.A. Woman (2009)
- "Zane One (L.A. Woman)" (2010)

=== Featured appearances ===
Year	Title	Other performers	Album
1996	"Just A Hip Hop Love Song"	Peace 586	The Risen Son
1998	"Thinkin' Out Loud"	LPG	360 Degrees
2002	"Let Go"	Raphi	Cali Quake
2005	"Infinite"	Macho, Sean Slaughter, Jamie, Sojourn	Freedom
2008	"Return of the Juke Joint"	Propaganda	Listen Watch Focus
2008	"I'm Not Having It"	LMNO	Let'emknow
2009	"Cool"	Peace 586	Hear
2009	"The Believers (Epstein remix)"	Fol Chen	The Longer U Wait
2011	"Up In Your System"	Macho, Jurny Big	Remember
2013	"Beast in Mans Clothing"	Gajah, Mute Speaker, Sojourn, Shames Worthy aka Raphi	On & Offspring
2013	"Up In Your System (SD Remix)"	Sundance, Macho, Jurny Big	Remixes From The Sun
2013	"Watch Out"	Sivion, Shames Worthy	Group Therapy
2014	"Penny Loafer"	LA Symphony	You Still On Earth?
2019	"Touch Forever"	Krum, Theory Hazit, Dirt	Here's Mud in Your Eye

=== Music videos ===
Title	Released	Director
"Zane One (L.A. Woman)"	May 13, 2010	N/A

== Filmography ==
Year	Title	Role	Notes
2004	The Battle for L.A.: Footsoldiers, Vol. 1	Herself	Documentary film, includes features of Propaganda, Raphi, Zane One, Jamie, and Jurny Big
