= Underground Rise, Volume 1: Sunrise/Sunset =

Tunnel Rats Present... Underground Rise, Volume 1: Sunrise/Sunset

Compilation album by Tunnel Rats and Various Artists
- Released: April 25, 2003
- Genres: Christian hip hop, underground hip hop
- Length: 68:00
- Label: UpRok
- Producers: Dert, Donovan Luke Henry, Jermz, Raphi

Uprok Records chronology
Uprok Records Mixtape, Vol. 1 (2002)	Tunnel Rats Present... Underground Rise, Volume 1: Sunrise/Sunset (2003)	Uprok Records Mixtape, Vol. 2 (2003)

Tunnel Rats chronology
Tunnel Vision (2001)	Underground Rise, Vol. 1: Sunrise/Sunset (2003)	Tunnel Rats (2004)

Tunnel Rats Present... Underground Rise, Volume 1: Sunrise/Sunset is a 2003 compilation album by Uprok Records in collaboration with underground hip hop collective Tunnel Rats. Around thirty-five rappers appear on the compilation, which features, in addition to the Tunnel Rats, numerous other underground hip hop artists and groups, Christian and non-Christian, including LA Symphony, LMNO and 2Mex of The Visionaries, Remnant, Mass Reality, Sekou the Misfit, and Deepspace5 members Playdough (also of Ill Harmonics), manCHILD of Mars Ill, and Listener. Production was handled by Tunnel Rats members Dert, Donovan Luke Henry, Jermz and Raphi (a.k.a. Shames Worthy). Most of the album was recorded over a single weekend. CCM Magazine noted that on the song "One Voice", the entire Tunnel Rats and LA Symphony crews come together, with seventeen rappers appearing on the same track. Critics received the album well, noting that it offered a diversity of musical styles and showcased the many talented artists in the underground and Christian hip hop scenes.

== Recording ==
Underground Rise was designed to highlight up-and-coming emcees in the underground and Christian hip hop scenes. Both Christian and non-Christian artists contributed to the compilation, and Rapzilla noted that it features around thirty-five rappers. Most of the Underground Rise was recorded in a single weekend.

== Style and lyrics ==
Thomas Quinlan of Exclaim! praised the album's diversity, with artists representing the West, East, and South, and producer Dert offering a mix of sound. Brenten Gilbert of Rapzilla drew attention to the project's lyrics, stating that "Lyrically, the album provides plenty of food for thought. Some standout lines include Macho's opening line ('20 years from now...'), Playdough's 'eject knows your crew' line, the Listener's 'lawn gnomes' lyric, and plenty of other gems along the way. There's even a six and a half minute 'cypher' that showcases some of the talent that you'll want to hear on solo projects." Josh Marihugh from The Phantom Tollbooth found Sekou the Misfit's song "Devil's Advocate", on which Sekou argues with God over the existence of suffering, as the high point of the album. Tim Lavenz of RapReviews.com also highlighted the song, writing that "Devil's Advocate", along with songs such as "Ladder" and "Suffocation" "do best to actually educate the listener about God, instead of just self-proclaiming religious battle raps."

== Critical reception ==
Professional ratings
Review scores
Source	Rating
Cross Rhythms	8/10 squares
The Phantom Tollbooth	4/5 stars
RapReviews.com	7/10
Rapzilla	3.5/5 stars

Andrzej Legierski of Cross Rhythms praised Underground Rise highly, rating the compilation eight out of ten squares. He highlighted the tracks "Intro", "How We Get Down", "Southern Brutality", "Kick Kick", "One Voice", "Remember this Day", and concluded that "'Sunrise/Sunset' is a powerful statement made in what is becoming a very diverse hip-hip scene in the States. Though little time was given to record this album it does not compromise the quality of the production or indeed the songs. A great overall feel that will make this hip-hop project a sure classic!" The Phantom Toolbooth provided two reviews of the album, both positive. Len Nash in an unrated review considered the compilation a phenomenal combination of hip hop artists that evidenced the growing impact of Christian hip hop, and said that "A person can finally find a good lyrical CD with a sound that doesn't disappoint. There is good Christian hip-hop out there." Josh Marihugh gave the album a four out of five, calling Underground Rise "a tight collection of nineteen tracks that combine fresh beats, clever hooks, and outspoken lyrics."

Thomas Quinlan of Exclaim! was highly favorable in his review of Underground Rise, considering it the best Uprok release to date, even better than Deepspace5's The Night We Called it a Day. He felt that the diversity should appeal to a wide variety of audiences, and expressed that the tracks "Doing Life" and "Lost" "are the only low moments on this superb collaborative project".

Tim Lavenz of RapReviews.com scored the album seven out of ten, praising the Underground Rise for drawing attention to "many of today's best known Christian rappers". While he considered the compilation's production well-made, he found that it at times becomes repetitive. Lavenz viewed the album's high points as coming "when the most experienced rappers serve up innovative verses that spread the message." In particular, he highlighted Sekou, manCHILD, Propaganda, and Raphi, writing that "These are the best artists featured on this collection..."

Brenten Gilbert of Rapzilla rated the album three-and-a-half out of four, stating that "the TRz crew creates a platform for up-and-coming heads in the game. With more emcees stepping up than your average compilation CD (somewhere in the neighborhood of thirty-five come through), it's easy to forget that this is a Tunnel Rats release. But once the music begins, the identity shines through." Like RapReview.com's Tim Lavenz, Gilbert found that the production at times grew repetitive, but that there are "enough bangers mixed in to keep you on board." However, he concluded that "when all is said and done, the Tunnel Rats hit their mark and made 'Underground Rise' a project worth copping. A genuine snapshot of where hip hop is at, and a glimpse of where it's heading."

== Track listing ==
Underground Rise, Volume 1: Sunrise/Sunset
No.	Title	Producer	Length
1.	"Intro" (featuring Jamie)		1:37
2.	"How We Get Down" (featuring Macho, Propaganda, Reconcile, Griffin, Elsie and Sev Statik)	Dert	4:01
3.	"You Don't Want That" (featuring Manchild, Playdough, Jurny, Raphi and Macho)	Dert	4:07
4.	"Southern Brutality" (featuring Dokument, Reconcile, Neogen, Lazarus and Propaganda)	Jermz	4:38
5.	"Kick Kick" (featuring LMNO, Dax, Knows, Zane, Dezin8ed and Sev Statik)	Dert	3:56
6.	"Devil's Advocate" (featuring Sekou the Misfit)	Dert	2:28
7.	"Concentrated" (Listener, Sev Statik and Dezin8ed)	Dert	3:44
8.	"Lost" (featuring Raphi, Macho, Neogen and Zane)	Donovan Luke Henry	3:59
9.	"Real Money" (Dert and Macho)	Dert	3:55
10.	"The Knack" (featuring Propaganda, Griffin, Drastic and Raphi)	Dert	3:43
11.	"Ladders" (Propaganda, Knows and Raphi)	Raphi	3:40
12.	"Interlude" (Knows and Propaganda)		1:09
13.	"One Voice" (Tunnel Rats and LA Symphony)	Dert	4:14
14.	"Suffocation" (Dokument, Drastic, Jurny and Raphi)	Dert	3:33
15.	"Mission Pen Possible" (featuring LPG, Mass Reality and Raphi)	Dert	3:56
16.	"Cyphers" (Elsie, Propaganda and Dax)	Jermz	3:38
17.	"Doing Life" (Drastic, Raphi and Elsie)	Dert	4:01
18.	"Remember This Day" (featuring Dax, 2Mex, Neogen, Dert, Reconcile, Professor Who, Dokument, Chosen1, Griffin, Lazarus, Raphi, Drastic, Propaganda and Macho)	Dert	6:27
19.	"Outro" (featuring Jamie)		1:14
