= Nephilim: Act of God 1 =

Studio album by Stu Dent
- Released: November 14, 2003
- Genre: Christian hip hop, underground hip hop
- Length: 56:26
- Label: Illect
- Producer: A-Typical, Beat Rabbi, Fred B, Ironiclee, JB!! a.k.a. Dirty Moses, June 22, JustMe, Kut-O, Mattman, Terakoza

Sev Statik chronology
Speak Life (2002)	Nephilim: Act of God 1 (2003)	Severed Remaynz II (2004)

Nephilim: Act of God 1 is the second studio album by hip hop musician Stu Dent, released November 14, 2003 through Illect Recordings. Stu Dent is an alternate moniker for Albany, New York artist Sev Statik, real name Joseph Evans. Evans originally created the Stu Dent pseudonym in order to release the album Altered State in 2001 without breaking his contractual obligations with Tunnel Rats, a hip hop musical collective of which he is part. Nephilim follows up on Altered State and the 2002 Sev Statik release Speak Life. The album includes production from Beat Rabbi and Freddie Bruno, fellow members of Deepspace5, a group Evans co-founded, and production and a guest appearance by JB!!, also known as Dirty Moses, a member of All Bully, another group that Evans helped found. Nephilim met with a highly positive reception from critics.

== Background ==
Joseph Evans was active as a rapper in the Albany area since the early 1990s, under the name Sev Statik. After the dissolution of Master Plan, a group he was part of, in 1996, Evans released two solo EPs. In 1997, he co-founded the supergroup Deepspace5, and joined the Los Angeles-based collective Tunnel Rats. He began recording music for a Sev Statik studio album, Speak Life, in 1999, but this project was held up due to problems that he and Tunnel Rats had with their current label. As Evans had promised Tunnel Rats that he would not release any solol material as Sev Statik until that group's Tunnel Vision album was released, he instead adopted an alternate stage name, Stu Dent, and released a different solo album, Altered State, in 2001 through Deepspace5 Recordings. Speak Life ultimately was re-recorded and then was released in 2002 through Uprok Records. Nephilim follows up on that release, and was originally intended to be the first installment in a three-part trilogy.

== Release and reception ==
Professional ratings
Review scores
Source	Rating
RapReviews.com	7/10
Rapzilla	4.5/5 stars

Nephilim was received very warmly by critics. Jon Corbin of cMusicWeb called the album an "above average project" for an underground release. The only drawback conceded by Corbin were that Stu Dent could have used better mixing, delivered his lines with more variety, and not start "virtually every song with 'Well I...'". RapReviews.com rated the album seven out of ten, stating that although the lyrical themes are somewhat unoriginal, on Nephilim Stu Dent "succeeds in delivery a thought-provoking and musically satisfying album, developed around an original and effective concept." Rapzilla awarded the album four-and-a-half stars out of five, concluding that "Offering 13 solid tracks, well thought out lyrics over tight beats, Stu Dent's latest release is bent on turning classic."

== Lyrics and style ==
The style on Nephilim falls under the labels of Christian hip hop and underground hip hop. Cornerstone at RapReviews.com found Stu Dent's vocal style similar to Aesop Rock and Slug, but "without the self-effacing sarcasm of either." Cornerstone also described producer Kut-O's piano-playing on the song "Invisibullet" as jazzy and "Pete Rock-esque". Jon Corbin at cMusicWeb highlighted the album's underground production style, citing in particular "Self Pharaoh", produced by JB!!, which Corbin felt was reminiscent of early De La Soul recordings.

Regarding the album's title and artwork, which references the Nephilim mentioned in Genesis 6:1–4, and how they pertain to the album's lyrical themes, critics took differing interpretations. Jon Corbin expressed his confusion at how the lyrics were related to the Nephilim, stating that "several listens to the record bring no context or explanation as to why that title was chosen." RapReviews.com viewed the album concept as Stu Dent "playing the part of a Nephilim – a half human, half angelic being – and exploring notions of modern living through religious allegory and introspective thought." Rapzilla explained that "Nephilim, literally translated means, 'fallen ones'", and thus believed that "the title couples fallen ones with an act of God. Deep, right? The tracks play off of this theme of fallen man and the self-destructive nature of our actions."

== Track listing ==
No.	Title	Producer	Length
1.	"Insomnia"	A-Typical	2:05
2.	"The Longest Night"	Prime	4:16
3.	"Splashed Ashore"	June 22	4:01
4.	"Invisibullet" (featuring EVS)	Kut-O	5:54
5.	"Emerging Kingdom" (featuring JB!! a.k.a. Dirty Moses)	June 22	4:10
6.	"Somewhere"	Fred B	2:48
7.	"Dayda Deigh" (featuring Capture and JustMe)	JustMe	4:17
8.	"Empty Inside"	Mattman	4:25
9.	"Self Pharaoh"	JB!!! a.k.a. Dirty Moses	3:55
10.	"Equation"	Mattman	4:51
11.	"Portable Eclipse" (featuring Relic)	Mattman	4:11
12.	"Tell No Man"	Ironiclee	3:53
13.	"Outlast"	Terakoza	4:33
14.	"That's It" (featuring DJ Allstar)	Beat Rabbi	4:05
