= Sintax the Terrific =

- Also known as: Sintax.the.Terrific or Sintax, ipoetlaurate, The Press Junket, Huckleberry Spins
- Born: Daniel Josev Brewer; Ann Arbor, Michigan
- Origin: Baltimore, Maryland; Washington, D.C.
- Genres: Christian hip hop
- Occupations: Rapper, songwriter, licensed federal attorney, blogger
- Instrument: vocals
- Years active: 1993–present
- Label: Illect
- Website: sintaxtheterrific.com

Daniel Josev Brewer, who goes by the stage name Sintax the Terrific, sometimes stylized as Sintax.the.Terrific or simply Sintax, is an American Christian hip hop musician and a founding member of both The Pride and the supergroup collective, Deepspace5. Brewer is also a practicing attorney in Columbia, South Carolina. He has released three studio albums through Illect Recordings – Simple Moves (2003), Curb Appeal (2007), and Prince with a Thousand Enemies with DJ Kurfu (2011) – and two studio albums, Qoheleth with Beat Rabbi (2010) and The Last Unicorn with Sir Chamberlain (2015), independently. Brewer, originally under the moniker ipoetlaurate and later The Press Junket, runs a blog for which he writes articles and composes songs discussing current social and political events. He released three compilation albums containing these songs in 2011, 2012, and 2013.

== Early life and legal career ==
Brewer was born Daniel Josev Brewer, in Ann Arbor, Michigan, and grew up in the cities of Baltimore and Washington, D.C. before going on to earn his baccalaureate from Furman University in Greenville, South Carolina. His Juris Doctor degree was earned at the University of South Carolina in Columbia, South Carolina, and he was admitted to the bar association in 2001. Described by the Houston Chronicle as "lawyer by day, rapper by night", Brewer practices law in Columbia, South Carolina and is a licensed federal attorney. He specializes in defending companies involved in commercial litigation, a profession which he jokingly has described as regularly ensuring "that companies can discriminate, steal, and maim with impunity".

== Music career ==
His music career began in 1993, with a demoed mixtape produced by DJ Dove, formerly of Gospel Gangstaz. He founded the hip hop group The Pride with Manchild and Recon. In 1997, at a hip-hop conference called Cruvention, the three subsequently co-founded Deepspace5 with Listener and Sev Statik, and released an EP. They later would be joined by DJ Dust, Freddie Bruno, Playdough, Beat Rabbi, Illtripp, DJ Manwell, and Sivion. The group released its first studio album, The Night We Called It a Day, in 2002. This was followed up by Unique, Just Like Everyone Else in 2005, Deepspace5oul with Beat Rabbi and Bakesale in 2008, and The Future Ain't What It Used to Be in 2010.

Brewer has released three solo studio albums. The first, Simple Moves, came out on July 8, 2003, through Illect Recordings. The subsequent studio album, Curb Appeal, was released on December 12, 2006, also through Illect Recordings. He collaborated with Beat Rabbi for his third release, Qoheleth, in 2010, and released the album independently. A fourth album, Prince with a Thousand Enemies, a collaboration with DJ Kurfu, was released through Illect on June 21, 2011. On December 28, 2015, on Bandcamp, Brewer released The Last Unicorn, a collaboration with the producer Sir Chamberlain. Dubbed an "evolving play" and "living play," additional songs were added to the recording after the initial release date. Brewer also creates what the Houston Chronicle described as "audible essays" and he calls song-blogs, songs for which he will write content based on various societal issues discussed in the news. Each song typically requires between two and four hours for him to craft, record, and upload to his dedicated website. In a TEDx Talk in 2012 at Greenville, South Carolina, outlined his recording process for this project and explained that this approach allows him to react much more spontaneously to current events, bypassing the several month delay typical for traditionally-released recordings. For this endeavor he originally used the name ipoetlaurate and subsequently The Press Junket, and released the songs in a series of compilations, Year One, Year Two, and Year Three, in December 2011, 2012, and 2013, respectively.

== Musical style ==
Brewer performs a very underground style of hip hop music, preferring darker styles of production. On Simple Moves, his style was described as hardcore, and his lyrics featured vulnerable, deeply emotional lines mixed with an often self-deprecating sense of humor. Brewer's vocal delivery, considered rather unusual, has been compared to that of his frequent collaborators Playdough and Manchild, as well as KJ-52.

== Discography ==
=== Studio albums ===
==== As Sintax the Terrific ====
- Simple Moves (July 8, 2003, Illect)
- Curb Appeal (December 12, 2006, Illect)
- Qoheleth with Beat Rabbi (2010, independent)
- Prince with a Thousand Enemies with DJ Kurfu (June 21, 2011, Illect)
- The Last Unicorn with Sir Chamberlain (December 21, 2015, independent)

==== As ipoetlaurate and The Press Junket ====
- Year One (December 5, 2011)
- Year Two (December 20, 2012)
- Year Three (December 30, 2013)

=== Extended plays ===
- Merciless (December 12, 2006, Illect)
- Of Venison Meat and Shining Wire with DJ Kurfu (November 15, 2011, Illect)
