= Sev Statik =

- Also known as: Stu Dent; Sev; Seven; The Point Man
- Born: Joseph T. Evans; December 11, 1971 (age 54)
- Origin: Albany, New York, United States
- Genres: Hip hop; rap rock
- Occupations: Musician; promoter
- Instrument: Vocals
- Years active: 1990–present
- Labels: Deepspace5; Domination; EMI; End of Earth; Gotee; Hip Hop Is Music; Illect; Mega Royal; New Realm; Oarfin; Pitch Control; Pointman; Rawkus; Sub-Bombin; Transcend
- Member of: Deepspace5; Tunnel Rats
- Website: sevstatik.com

Joseph T. Evans (born December 11, 1971), known professionally as Sev Statik and Stu Dent, is a hip hop musician and promoter from Albany, New York. Active as a rapper since the early 1990s, he has performed and recorded both as a solo artist and as a member of the hip hop collectives Deepspace5 and Tunnel Rats. Evans has also been a member of various Albany-area hip hop groups, including All Bully, Master Plan, Body Language, currently fronts the rap rock band Goldtooth, and is active in Pitch Control Music, a musical collective and arts movement he co-founded in order to promote and develop hip hop in the Albany area. Evans is a freemason in East Greenbush, New York.

Evans has released six studio albums and multiple EPs under the Sev Statik moniker, another two under the Stu Dent moniker, and numerous recordings as a member of various music groups. In 1996, he co-founded the supergroup Deepspace5, and joined the Los Angeles–based collective Tunnel Rats in 1997. In 2001, Evans released a studio album, Altered State, under the name Stu Dent. As Sev Statik, he released his debut studio album, Speak Life, in 2002. A second Stu Dent recording, Nephilim: Act of God 1, was released in 2003. Under the Sev Statik moniker, Evans has released five additional studio albums: Slow Burn (2005), Sliver LP (2007), Back to Dust with DJ Dust (2007), Shotgun (2008), and Sondial with Rawthreat (2011), as well as a collaborative album, Falling Tsar (2008), with Scribbling Idiots members JustMe, Wonder Brown, and Theory Hazit. He co-founded the rap rock band Goldtooth in 2011.

== History ==
=== Early career ===
Evans ventured into hip hop music during the early 1990s, after being awed by local DJ and MC performances in Albany neighborhoods. Studying the rhyme patterns of artists such as Rakim, KRS, Just-Ice, Run–D.M.C., Freestyle Fellowship, and others, Evans began freestyling. Evans states that at this point, he did not write down any of his rhymes as he "had no idea [those artists] wrote down their raps until later on. I thought it was all off the head because that's what I first saw at parties and on the street." Originally, he went by the name Seven, with Sev for short, but came up with a second part, "Statik", during a freestyle. He promoted himself through flyers, posters, and booking his own shows at venues. Evans claims that these early efforts led to him becoming the first hip hop artist to appear on the cover of Metroland in 1993. From 1993 through 1996, he was active in the hip hop group Master Plan, recording two albums with the group.

=== Studio debuts and work with collectives (1996–2002) ===
In 1996, Evans released two EPs under the Sev Statik name, and, during a Christian hip hop convention in Florida, co-founded Deepspace5 with Listener, Sintax.the.Terrific, Manchild and Recon. The next year, the supergroup released an EP, The Beginning, is the Start of Everything. Evans also joined the West Coast-based collective Tunnel Rats. In 1998, he joined with JB to form Illumination, which released the EP Temple of Light. In 1999 he recorded the studio album Speak Life, but formed an agreement with Tunnel Rats not to release an album under the Sev Statik name until the group released its next album. Instead, he created an alternate moniker, Stu Dent, and released a different studio album, Altered State, in 2001. In 2000, he teamed up with the hip hop artists Dan "Dezin8ed" Hulbert and Atypical, and later on with Sween McCann, to found Pitch Control Music, an arts movement and loose musical collective based in the Albany area to promote hip hop culture. In a 2002 Metroland article, Evans explained that his intention for initiating the collective was "to put Albany on the map. Any kind of exposure we can get here in the 518 for anybody, it’ll bring A&Rs, it’ll bring managers, and the attention of the industry to the Albany area.”

Tunnel Rats released Tunnel Vision in October 2001, and Evans followed up that release with a re-recorded version Speak Life in 2002, making his studio debut as Sev Statik. The album was released through UpRok and distributed by EMI. Evans has since expressed some reservations about the final song list of that album, but acknowledges that the album allowed him to promote himself through Tunnel Rats' exposure. Also in 2002, Evans released a compilation album, Severed Remaynz, a 12" single, and a studio album with the Albany group All Bully, a band consisting of, in addition to himself, Dezin8ed, Sween, JB!!, and Soundwave. Deepspace5, which by this point had expanded to include DJ Dust, Playdough, Freddie Bruno, and Sivion, also released its first album, The Night We Called it a Day.

=== Continued activities (2003–2009) ===
In 2003, Tunnel Rats released the compilation and sampler album Underground Rise, Volume 1: Sunrise/Sunset, on which Tunnel Rats collaborated with Deepspace5, LA Symphony, and numerous other underground hip hop artists. This was followed up by the collective's third and final studio album, Tunnel Rats, in 2004. In 2003, Evans released his second studio album as Stu Dent, Nephilim: Act of God 1, and a second Severed Remaynz compilation was released in 2004. His second studio album as Sev Statik, Slow Burn, came out in 2005, and Deepspace5 released Unique, Just Like Everyone Else. Also in 2005, Evans joined up with fellow Albany-area hip hop artist Rick Whispers to form Body Language and record the studio album All Up In Yer Grill Piece, which was later released as a free download. In 2006, Evans released a Sev Statik studio album, Sliver LP, a remix of Slow Burn entitled Afterburn, and the compilation Severed Remaynz III. A fourth studio album, Back to Dust, followed in 2007, and featured Deepspace5 member DJ Dust as producer. In 2008, Deepspace5 released two studio albums, Deepspacesoul, a project put together by one of the collective's producers, Beat Rabbi, and Bake Sale. As a solo artist, Evans released the studio album Shotgun and collaborated with Scribbling Idiots members JustMe, Wonder Brown, and Theory Hazit to release the studio album Falling Tsar.

=== Goldtooth and current activity (since 2010) ===
Evans released two albums in 2010, an EP titled School Shooting with DJ Tone and Back to Dust Remix, a compilation remixed by Theory Hazit, and Deepspace5 also released the studio album The Future Ain't What it Used to Be. In 2011, he released the studio album Sondial, which features production by Rawthreat. That same year, he joined the band Goldtooth. Goldtooth was formed when the drummer Dan Beck "El Mustango", of the recently dissolved band Honeycreepers, contacted Evans and discussed the idea of a collaboration with him and fellow Honeycreepers member Sean Fortune. Evans expressed in an interview that he initially was unsure of the idea, since he had not heard of the other musicians before, but found that things worked out. Matt Ferguson of Beware! the Other Head of Science also joined, rounding out the group to a quartet with Dan Beck "El Mustango" on drums, Sean Fortune on bass, Sev Statik as emcee, and Ferguson on guitar and synthesizers. Ferguson stated that "95 percent" of the band's material is covers of previous songs written by Sev Statik. Goldtooth released the song "Change the World" on August 27, 2013, for purchase off of Bandcamp. Evans released two more EPs as Sev Statik, Sinderblock in 2012 and Sophy in 2013.

== Personal life ==
Evans is a freemason at the Van Rensselaer Lodge No. 87, located in East Greenbush, New York. Evans was born on December 11, 1971.

== Discography ==
=== As Sev Statik ===
==== Studio ====
- Speak Life – 2002
- Slow Burn – 2005
- Sliver LP – 2006
- Back to Dust with DJ Dust – 2007
- Shotgun – 2008
- Falling Tsar with JustMe, Wonder Brown, and Theory Hazit – 2008
- Sondial with Rawthreat – 2011

==== EP ====
- Speak Life – 1996
- The Point Man – 1996
- School Shooting with DJ Tone – 2010
- Sinderblock with The Vinylcologist – 2012
- Sophy – 2013

==== Compilations ====
- Severed Remaynz – 2002
- Severed Remaynz II – 2004
- Severed Remaynz III – 2006
- Afterburn (remix) – 2006
- Back to Dust Remix with Theory Hazit (remix) – 2010

=== As Stu Dent ===
- Altered State – (2001)
- Nephilim: Act of God 1 – (2003)
