= Slow Burn (Sev Statik album) =

Studio album by Sev Statik
- Released: March 7, 2005
- Studio: Air Force 1 Studio (Mechanicville, New York); Money Mike's Lab
- Genre: Underground hip hop
- Length: 52:27
- Label: Pitch Control; Pointman
- Producer: Dert; Finer Arts; Gershom; The Hobbyist; JB!!; Joey Beats; Rel McCoy; Shawn J. Period; Tony Stone

Sev Statik chronology
Severed Remaynz II (2004)	Slow Burn (2005)	Afterburn (2006)

Slow Burn is a studio album by Albany, New York hip hop musician Sev Statik, released on March 7, 2005, through his own independent label Pointman Music, in association with Pitch Control Music. While Sev Statik, real name Joseph Evans, had also released two albums under the name Stu Dent, Slow Burn is his second studio album under the Sev Statik moniker, following up on 2002's Speak Life. The album met with a mixed critical reception.

== Background and release ==
Joseph Evans has been active as a hip hop artist in Albany since the early 1990s. In 1997, he helped form the musical collective and supergroup Deepspace5, and that same year joined the Los Angeles-based collective Tunnel Rats. After releasing the studio album Altered State in 2001 under the "Stu Dent" moniker, Evans made his studio debut as Sev Statik with Speak Life, released in 2002 through Uprok Records and EMI. He released another Stu Dent album, Nephilim: Act of God 1, in 2003. Slow Burn was released on March 7, 2005, on Evans's own Pointman Music label, an affiliate of Pitch Control Music, a musical collective, record label, and arts movement he co-founded in 2000. The album was produced by Dert, Finer Arts, Gershom, The Hobbyist, JB!!, Joey Beats, Relic The Oddity, Shawn J. Period, and Tony Stone.

== Reception ==
Professional ratings
Review scores
Source	Rating
RapReviews.com	6.5/10
Rapzilla	3.5/5 stars

The critical reception for Slow Burn was mixed. Rapnews.co.uk was highly favorable to the album, praising its production, lyrics, and song selection, and considering the album a solid release all-around. Tom Doggett of RapReviews.com rated the album six-and-a-half out of ten, concluding that the album was a solid release but that Sev Statik could have been more interesting and risk-taking in his approach. Rapzilla gave the album three-and-a-half stars out of five, praising the production values and Sev Statik's direct and laid back approach. The site, which posted the review in May 2005, concluded that it was one of the best releases thus far that year.

== Track listing ==
All tracks are written by Sev Statik.

No.	Title	Producer(s)	Length
1.	"Slow Burn"	Tony Stone	2:17
2.	"Son Come Down"	Joey Beats	3:46
3.	"As One"	Shawn J. Period	4:23
4.	"Line Life"	Rel McCoy	4:13
5.	"Wasted Tears"	Finer Arts	3:54
6.	"Well Traveled" (featuring Explicit)	Relic the Oddity	4:48
7.	"Crime of the Century"	JB!!	4:16
8.	"Love You Anyway"	Joey Beats	5:21
9.	"Kept the Break"	Relic the Oddity	3:49
10.	"Contrast"	Relic the Oddity	4:14
11.	"Spare Change"	Dert	2:20
12.	"And Uhhh..."	The Hobbyist	4:49
13.	"Keep An Eye Out"	Gershom (featuring Magnet)	4:17
