= The Night We Called It a Day (album) =

Studio album by Deepspace5
- Released: January 8, 2002
- Recorded: Dallas, Texas
- Genre: Christian hip hop, East Coast hip hop, underground hip hop
- Length: 67:05
- Label: UpRok
- Producer: Beat Rabbi, DJ Dust, Freddie Bruno, Harry Krum

Deepspace5 chronology
The Beginning, Is the Start of Everything (1997)	The Night We Called It a Day (2002)	Unique, Just Like Everyone Else (2005)

The Night We Called It a Day is the debut studio album by underground hip hop supergroup Deepspace5, released on January 8, 2002, through Uprok Records. It was recorded in Dallas, Texas.

== Recording ==
The Night We Called It a Day was recorded in one week in Dallas, Texas, at the apartment of group member Playdough. It was produced by Beat Rabbi, DJ Dust, Freddie Bruno, and Playdough, with Playdough producing under a different moniker, Harry Krum. During the recording sessions, the group met future member Sivion.

== Lyrics and musical style ==
The album features an underground, anti-commercial style. Jayson Young of RapReviews.com called the album "strictly ground-roots, MC/DJ, hard-core hip-hop". Young also found the Listener's vocal style similar to Son Doobie and noted that "Stick This In Your Ear" includes a flute sample. Jon Corbin, writing for cMusicWeb.com, noted that on "World Go Round", Beat Rabbi brings a progressive jazz feel through the use of drum patterns and bass lines. Jesus Freak Hideout's Chanile Campbell described the album as east coast "smooth and a little jazzy". RapReviews.com and Sam Gunnell of Cross Rhythms also described the album as very chill and laid back, with Gunnell commenting that "If there is such a thing as easy listening hip hop, then this is it!"

Thomas Quinlan of Exclaim! described the lyrical content of the album as mostly "high concept songs," but with some testimonials and praises to God. Sam Gunnell of Cross Rhythms and Jason Birchmeier of Allmusic both noted that the album's lyrics are intellectual and often humorous. Several reviewers noted the unusual verse by Listener on "Stick This In Your Ear," where he reads off a paragraph exactly as written, including punctuation. Jason Young wrote that the Listener "literally says every period, comma, and semi-colon found in his verse." Also highlighted by reviewers was the skit "Close Caption," where the Listener translates a sign language rap by "MC Fong."

== Critical reception ==
Professional ratings
Review scores
Source	Rating
Allmusic	3/5 stars
Cross Rhythms	8/10 squares
Jesus Freak Hideout	4/5 stars
RapReviews.com	9/10
Rapzilla	4/5 stars

Critics responded quite favorably to the album. AllMusic rated the album three out of five stars and found the album's seven-minute-plus title track to be the standout track. Jon Corbin of cMusicWeb.com wrote, "Locked in Playdough's apartment, these boys got their creative juices flowing and whipped up something sweet, an album that reclaims hip-hop for the emcee." Corbin considered all the songs well-crafted and developed, with the exceptions of "Murder Creek" and "Take the Rhythm", tracks which Corbin said would have the listener hitting the skip button. These tracks aside, he summarized:

The production is very strong, especially considering that the album was created in a week. Overall, this is a very good disc, filled with a wide range of topics to engage your mind and get your head nodding.

Sam Gunnell of Cross Rhythms rated the album eight out of ten squares and stated that when he first heard Deepspace5, he dismissed the group as "just another depressing Christian rap group", but that this release proved him wrong. Exclaim!'s Thomas Quinlan opined that "Deepspace 5 demonstrate skills on their debut album that should get them respect, regardless of the message" and concluded that the group "is another example that Christian hip-hop is taking great strides forward." Jesus Freak Hideout gave the album four stars, calling Deepspace5 "the hip hop that has been missed in the Christian music industry until now." RapReviews.com scored the album nine out of ten, expressing that while the album displays some flaws typical of underground hip hop, namely that it avoids "party-starters," instead preferring to stay "laid back and mellow", and also that sometimes the songs start to all sound the same, but concluded that "Look past those tiny flaws and you'll find a fantastic rap album with enough depth to keep you coming back again and again. Hard beats and hard rhymes in a tight overall package are just the beginning here." Rapzilla gave the album a four out of five and stated:

Deepspace5 represents some of the best talent hip-hop has to offer, which makes it absolutely shameful that The Night... was basically released under the rug. The push on this project was surprisingly minimal, and as the rumors of a sophomore release tickle my ears, I only hope that things change.

== Track listing ==
No.	Title	Producer(s)	Length
1.	"The Collective (Info)"		1:15
2.	"The Night We Called It a Day" (featuring Freddie Bruno, Listener, Manchild, Playdough, Sev Statik, and Sintax the Terrific)	DJ Dust	7:10
3.	"Elementary" (featuring Freddie Bruno, Listener, Manchild, Playdough, and Syntax the Terrific)	Freddie Bruno	4:53
4.	"Stick This in Your Ear" (featuring Listener, Manchild, and Playdough)	Beat Rabbi	6:06
5.	"Winter in Manhattan" (featuring Freddie Bruno, Listener, Sev Statik, and Syntax the Terrific)	DJ Dust	5:00
6.	"Take the Rhythm" (featuring Freddie Bruno, Listener, Manchild, Playdough, Sev Statik, and Syntax the Terrific)	Harry Krum	4:55
7.	"Closed Caption" (featuring Listener and Beat Rabbi)	Beat Rabbi	1:58
8.	"This Curse I Bear" (featuring Listener, Manchild, Playdough, and Sev Statik)	DJ Dust	4:56
9.	"Ziontific" (featuring Freddie Bruno, Manchild, and Syntax the Terrific)	Harry Krum	4:08
10.	"World Go Round" (featuring Listener, Manchild, and Playdough)	Beat Rabbi	4:52
11.	"F-Words" (featuring Listener, Manchild, and Sev Statik)	DJ Dust	4:22
12.	"Joywriting" (featuring Listener, Sev Statik, and Syntax the Terrific)	Harry Krum	4:05
13.	"Murder Creek" (featuring Listener, Sev Statik, and Syntax the Terrific)	DJ Dust	3:55
14.	"Thinking By Numbers" (featuring Listener, Manchild, and Sev Statik)	Beat Rabbi	5:35
15.	"If Tomorrow Starts Without Me" (featuring Listener, Manchild, Playdough)	DJ Dust	3:55
