= Stop the Music (album) =

Studio album by New Breed
- Released: March 12, 2002
- Genre: Christian hip hop, Latin hip hop
- Length: 65:53
- Label: UpRok, EMI Christian
- Producer: Dert, Tunnel Rats

New Breed chronology
Stop the Music (2002)	Nine (2004)

Stop the Music is the debut album by Christian Latin hip hop brother-sister duo New Breed, a Tunnel Rats affiliate, released on March 12, 2002, through Uprok Records in the United States and through EMI Christian Music Group in the United Kingdom. Featuring a Latin-influenced East Coast hip hop sound that revealed the duo's Puerto Rican heritage, Stop the Music met with positive critical reception from critics.

== Lyrics and style ==
AllMusic's Johnny Loftus wrote that Stop the Music "showcased Macho and Elsie's bold rhymes and decidedly Latin flavor." Tom Semioli in his AllMusic review explained that the duo's use of sound blasts "tethers rhythms and harmonic motifs with funky bass samples and an in-the-pocket back-beat that echoes reggae and disco." He described "Verse of the City" and "Stand" as expressing the duo's pride in its "ghetto savvy and learning", while "Stop the Music" at first tackles class conflict before unexpectedly veering inward to address fellow rappers. "Song Speaks", according to Semioli, "declares the spiritual importance of rap via jazzy piano riffs, scat singing, and thought provoking stream of conscious dialogue". CMJ New Music Monthly stated that

From tales of everyday struggle ('Stop the Music'), to lighter, feel-good joints like 'Think' and the more spoken-word, jazzy flavor of 'Song Speaks,' the album flows from the aggressive to mellow with ease, showcasing the wide range of the duo's talent and its all-encompassing musical vibe.

Cross Rhythms' Peter Bate proclaimed that

Unlike many of their peers, the siblings offer a vertical dimension thanks to their faith which is forcefully expounded though never rammed down the audience's throat. Listener suffocation is prevented by Latin-flavored interludes, sparing blasts of soulful vocals and Fender Rhodes, most effective on woozy closing track 'Outro'.

Matt Jost from RapReviews.com said that

Clearly rocking an East Coast steelo and drawing influence from their Puerto Rican heritage, New Breed spit hard rhymes over hard beats. Yet at the same time you'll hardly get to hear a rap album as elegant as 'Stop the Music' this year.

Jost wrote that the Latin anthem "My People"

contains the token Latin instruments, rhythms and melodies that have permeated contemporary pop music, but it sounds incredibly raw and real. Further flavor is added by singer Dax Reynosa, who shares some of his passion for his people with us (with Macho right behind him translating).

== Critical reception ==
Professional ratings
Review scores
Source	Rating
AllMusic	3/5 stars
Cross Rhythms	9/10 squares
RapReviews.com	8/10

Stop the Music met with a warm reception from critics. AllMusic gave the album three out of five stars, with Tom Semioli calling the album "a powerful debut disc of poetry, imagery, and melody." Lisa Hageman of CMJ New Music Monthly in the conclusion of her review considered the album "An impressive, multi-dimensional debut from a duo to keep an eye on." Peter Bate of Cross Rhythms rated the album nine-out-of-ten squares and concluded that "Rarely has keeping it in the family sounded so good."

Matt Jost of RapReviews.com scored the album eight out of ten, writing "highly professional on all levels, "Stop the Music" is based on the stable chemistry this brother/sister duo has developed over the years." Jost found the album's production

a testament to the days of the boom bap, with every drum beat and every bassline falling into place, producing the sonic boom that your speakers love. Instead of raiding other people's sound libraries, producer Dert comes up with his very own line of sound effects, presenting them in a fashion that is guaranteed to provoke all kinds of body movements, from a reluctant nod to joyous jumping - which both fall in line with the strongly felt physical presence of the music itself.

Jost concluded that

New Breed have a message, and it's got something to do with Christ. But let me say they get props for incorporating it so wisely. As Elsie says: 'Search what you want, but integrity's what you'll find.' So think of "Stop the Music" as an album free of petty beefs, with music tight like that, think of that historic album that never got its due props, an album Bob Marley would nod his head to, an album that spreads wealth instead of hoarding it, an album that is, in its own way, 'bigger than hip-hop'. Your future favorite album?

== Track listing ==
- All production by Dert, except 08. "Song Speaks interlude", produced by Tunnel Rats

Track list
No.	Title	Length
1.	"Intro"	0:15
2.	"Verse of the City"	3:47
3.	"Stand" (featuring Raphi)	3:42
4.	"Stop the Music"	4:07
5.	"Landsdowne St. interlude"	0:27
6.	"Live This"	3:29
7.	"Think"	4:22
8.	"Song Speaks interlude" (featuring Shihan & Donovan Luke Henry)	2:36
9.	"Papi Papi" (featuring Donovan Luke Henry)	4:22
10.	"My People interlude"	1:10
11.	"My People" (featuring Dax Reynosa)	4:36
12.	"Headlock" (featuring LPG)	3:51
13.	"Don’t Listen to Your Heart" (featuring Theresa Jones)	4:21
14.	"Dry Bones"	5:10
15.	"Breathless" (Theresa Jones)	4:55
16.	"Runaway"	3:52
17.	"What's My Name"	4:01
18.	"Your Voice"	4:34
19.	"Outro"	2:16
