= Dax Reynosa =

Musician from Whittier, California

- Born: 1969 or 1970 (age 56–57); Whittier, California
- Occupations: Rapper, singer, songwriter, hip hop and film producer, music manager
- Relatives: Zane Reynosa (sister); Jurny Big (cousin)
- Musical career
- Also known as: Theory
- Genres: Christian hip hop, freestyle rap, smooth jazz, underground hip hop
- Instruments: Rapping, singing, production equipment
- Years active: 1983–present
- Labels: Antagonist, Brainstorm, independent, Solar, UpRok

Dax Reynosa, often mononymously known as Dax and by the former stage name Theory, is an American underground hip hop artist, producer, songwriter, smooth jazz singer, and music manager from Whittier, California. As a hip hop artist, he co-founded the underground Christian hip hop collective Tunnel Rats and the affiliated groups LPG, Footsoldiers, and The Resistance. He also co-founded the Latin funk and R&B band Elé and formed The Dax Band. He has contributed vocals and songwriting to numerous jazz recordings.

== Biography ==
In 1983, influenced by the newly emerged hip hop culture at Radiotron in MacArthur Park, Reynosa started b-boying and battle rapping. His lyrics discussed both his Christian faith and the crack epidemic he grew up amidst. He cites his formative influences as David Guzman and Soldiers for Christ. He also formed a dance crew, Cousins Three, with his cousins V.Night and Jurny Big, and they would compete at both dance and rapping at Pico Rivera Park. Reynosa in 2012 recounted the fiercely competitive nature of the rap battles he engaged in: "When you lose, you change your name cuz I’m gonna iron your name on the back of my sweater. We battle for rhyme books and you can never rap those rhymes again. I would burn it in front of you."

In 1993, he formed the collective Tunnel Rats, taking inspiration for its name from his father, who served as a tunnel rat in the Vietnam War. Mostly finding audiences at churches, the group struggled to find acceptance from many Christians due to their lyrical braggadocio. The group also encountered racial prejudice when touring in the Southern United States because the majority of the group was of Mexican descent. Shortly after the formation of Tunnel Rats, Reynosa and Jurny Big, as LPG, released The Earthworm in 1995, a breakthrough album in Christian hip hop. The next year, Tunnel Rats released its first album, Experience. LPG released a second album, 360 Degrees, in 1998, and Tunnel Rats released the groundbreaking Tunnel Vision through Uprok Records in 2001. LPG dropped The Gadfly in 2003, and Tunnel Rats led the Uprok compilation Underground Rise, Volume 1: Sunrise/Sunset. Tunnel Rats released its self-titled album in 2004. In 2006, Reynosa helped organize the Tunnel Rats-affiliated group Footsoldiers, and formed the production duo The Resistance with Tunnel Rats producer Dert. Footsoldiers and the Resistance collaborated with KRS-One on his album Life, and KRS-One in return appeared on the Footsoldiers' album Live This. Reynosa co-produced the 2003 documentary film, The Battle for L.A.: Footsoldiers, Vol. 1, with director Darren Doane. Tunnel Rats currently is on hiatus, and Reynosa currently contributes vocals to jazz recordings. In 2013, he co-founded Elé with Adelaide "Addie" Benavides, and works as the band's manager. Elé mixes together R&B, pop, funk and blues with Latin genres such as cumbia, merengue, and salsa. He also formed a self-described jazz band, The Dax Band.

== Discography ==
=== As featured artist ===
Title	Other artists	Year	Album
"What I Feel"	Future Shock	1996	Remember the Future
"Costume and Rumors"	Future Shock	1996	Remember the Future
"Peace in the Puzzle"	Future Shock	1996	Remember the Future
"Welcome"	Raphi, Macho	2002	Cali Quake
"Better"	Raphi	2002	Cali Quake
"Speak Life"	Sev Statik	2002	Speak Life
"My People"	New Breed	2002	Stop the Music
"Keep On Singin'"	Propaganda	2003	Out of Knowhere
"Kick Kick"	LMNO, Knows, Zane, Dezin8ed, and Sev Statik	2003	Underground Rise, Volume 1: Sunrise/Sunset
"Cyphers"	Elsie and Propaganda	2003	Underground Rise, Volume 1: Sunrise/Sunset
"Remember this Day"	2Mex, Neogen, Dert, Reconcile, Professor Who, Dokument, Chosen1, Griffin, Lazarus, Raphi, Drastic, Propaganda, and Macho	2003	Underground Rise, Volume 1: Sunrise/Sunset
"Lost Angels"	Jurny Big	2003	Biggest of 'em All
"Freedom"	KRS-One, Ishues	2006	Life
"Not Anymore"	Zane One	2008	L.A. Woman
"Rise"	Propaganda	2009	Listen Watch Focus
"Watch (Healing)"	Peace 586	2009	HeAr
"Yes"	Euge Groove	2009	Sunday Morning
"Let Me Love You"	Paul Brown	2010	Love You Found Me
"Shine Shoes"	Marcin Nowakowski	2011	Shine
"Live Your Dream"	Macho	2011	Remember
"Drum"	Shihan the Poet	2013	Music is the New Cotton
"Where Do We Go From Here"	Daniel Chia, Lew Liang	2017	In the Moment
"Say You Will"	Daniel Chia, Paul Brown	2017	In the Moment
"I Never Knew"	Triune, DJ Joey C	2019	The Love Album

== Production discography ==
Year	Title	Artist
1996	Remember the Future	Future Shock
1996	Experience	Tunnel Rats
2001	Tunnel Vision	Tunnel Rats
2002	Cali Quake	Raphi
2003	Stop the Music	New Breed
2003	Zion	Zion
2005	"Now I Know"	Bigg Milt

=== The Resistance production discography ===
Year	Title	Artist
2005	Both Sides	Tunnel Rats
2006	Life	KRS-One
2006	Live This	Footsoldiers

== Additional credits ==
Year	Work	Artist	Credit
2003	The Gadfly	LPG	Executive production
2006	Life	KRS-One	Executive production, vocals
2010	Love You Found Me	Paul Brown	Vocal production, vocals, composition
2012	"Love Don't Come EZ"	Paul Brown	Composition, vocals
2013	Real Life	Bart Brandjes	Vocals, composition
2013	"Take You Here"	Tierra	Composition
2014	Wishing on Love	Melina	Vocals, composition
2014	"Sunrise on Sunset"	Paul Brown	Composition
2016	"Midnight Passion"	Bennet B	Composition
2018	"Yesterday Love"	Rob Zinn	Vocals, composition

== Filmography ==
Year	Title	Producer	Notes
2004	The Battle for L.A.: Footsoldiers, Vol. 1	X mark	Documentary film
