= The Night We Called It a Day =

The Night We Called It a Day may refer to:

- "The Night We Called It a Day" (song), a popular song by Matt Dennis and Tom Adair
- The Night We Called It a Day (film), a 2003 Australian movie about Frank Sinatra's trip to Australia
- The Night We Called It a Day (album), the first album by Deepspace5
- The reissue of the Frank Sinatra album Where Are You?
