= Tunnel Rats (album) =

Studio album by Tunnel Rats
- Released: March 3, 2004
- Genre: Christian hip hop, West Coast hip hop, underground hip hop
- Length: 1:01:42
- Label: UpRok
- Producer: Dert, Jason Panucci, Jermz, Raphi

Tunnel Rats chronology
Underground Rise, Vol. 1: Sunrise/Sunset (2003)	Tunnel Rats (2004)

Tunnel Rats is the third studio album by West Coast underground Christian hip hop collective Tunnel Rats, released on March 3, 2004, through Uprok Records. Featuring several new members among the group's ranks, the album was well received by critics, with Christianity Today and Rapzilla considering it the best album so far by the group.

== Background ==
Tunnel Rats formed in Los Angeles county in 1993 after group leader and founder Dax Reynosa held an open mike at his house. Committed to ministry and sharing the Gospel, the group eschewed joining a major, corporate record label, which could have suppressed its artistic and ministry potential, and preferred instead to take a more underground approach. Wade-O Radio explains that over the next few decades, the Tunnel Rats "expanded and contracted through nearly three 'generations'," and shifted from a heavy California focus to include artists from Boston, Texas, and New York City. The group released its first studio album, Experience, in 1996, through the independent label Brainstorm International. After some line-up changes, including the addition of members Sev Statik (also of Deepspace5) and brother-sister duo New Breed, Tunnel Rats released its second studio album, Tunnel Vision, in 2001 through the independent label Uprok Records. After this release, several more new members joined the group, including rapper-producer duo The Foundation (consisting of Dokument and Jermz) and Propaganda. Christianity Today's Andree Farias pointed out that the lineup additions that occurred since 2001 nearly doubled the collective's membership and expanded the collective's sound. In 2003, the group released a compilation entitled Underground Rise, Volume 1: Sunrise/Sunset in conjunction with Uprok, and followed in 2004 with its self-titled studio release. Farias found himself somewhat surprised that the Tunnel Rats' decided to release a self-titled release after over ten years of activity, especially since by the time of the release and recording of Tunnel Rats, Uprok Records had declined, overshadowed by its parent company BEC Recordings, and very little promotion was devoted to any of the remaining artists on the Uprok roster.

== Style and lyrics ==
Cross Rhythms noted that the album features tracks "either written or collectively delivered" by Dokument, Macho, Jamie, Propaganda, Raphi, Zane, Dert, Griffin, Elsie, Theresa Jones, Sev Statik and New Breed. Lyrically, much of the album continued with the braggadocio that Tunnel Rats was known for, with Brenten Gilbert noting that "over half of the lyric sheets with reminders of who they are and what they've accomplished." However, the group did address more serious topics, such as "Her Story", performed by female rappers Jamie, Elsie, and Zane, which tackles the issue of objectification of women.

Andree Farias of Christianity Today described the album's overall sound as a combination of "cerebral hip-hop groups like Jurassic5 and MarsILL, plus the fun-based approach of L.A. Symphony and pre-Elephunk Black Eyed Peas." He further noted that the expansion of the collective's membership since Tunnel Vision "rendered this new CD's scope and complexity more sonorous and menacing than their previous releases." According to Farias, "We Just Roll Deep" combines "Timbaland-ish beats, Latin congas, and bassless, metallic kicks" with "Jigga-styled flows." Both Farias and Gilbert considered the production more varied than on previous releases, as it features a more mainstream sound with occasional string sections, and sometimes draws from old school, underground, Latin, and synthpop influences.

== Critical reception ==
Professional ratings
Review scores
Source	Rating
Christianity Today	4.5/5 stars
Cross Rhythms	8/10 squares
Rapzilla	3.5/5 stars

Thomas McCalla of Cross Rhythms rated the album eight out of ten squares, stating that on this release the collective "bob, weave, duck and deliver a hard hitting release of personal testimonies and various life issues." He highlighted the opening track "Born Again", which he called "a strong head bobber with an impulsive hook on the chorus", and said that "Sev Statik does it for me on his no compromise track 'Disposable'."

Andree Farias Christianity Today rated the album four-and-a-half stars out of five, saying of Tunnel Rats that "this heterogeneous crew features some of the most proficient wordsmiths and beatmakers in underground hip-hop today, faculties that shine copiously throughout the album's 20 rock-solid compositions." He concluded that "This is the group's definite magnum opus, an effort where not only lyricism and scintillating rhythms collide, but where also faith and an unflinching heart for ministry resound with more clarity than ever before." Farias also explained that producer Dert greatly matured since his debut, as with this album Dert took a more mainstream approach. "Never The Less" and "Planet Dok" Farias considered a departure from the Tunnel Rats norm, with "Dre-inspired rhythm tracks and Eminem-esque string sections."

He found the production by Raphi "slightly more underground in feel (Sev Statik's "Burn"), Latin-infused (the worshipful "Forever Yours"), or even Eurythmics-informed (the synthpop-ish "Point Taken")."

Rapzilla's Brenten Gilbert rated the album three-point-five out of five, writing that despite numbering around fifteen members, the collective managed to balance its verses well, and new members Dokument and Griffin shone brightly both throughout the album and on their respective features "Planet Dok" and "My Name is Griffin". Like Farias, Gilbert found the production by Dert more mature, stating that he "managed to break out of the monotonous compositions from the previous Tunnel Rats efforts, solo and otherwise." Gilbert concluded that Tunnel Rats "improved greatly since the release of 'Tunnel Vision' (most notably in the music) and they don't seem to have any notion of stopping any time soon."

== Track listing ==
Tunnel Rats
No.	Title	Producer(s)	Length
1.	"Born Again" (Macho, Jamie, Propaganda, Raphi, Zane One, Dokument, Griffin, Elsie, featuring Theresa Jones)	Dert	4:22
2.	"True Underground" (Macho, Dokument)	Dert	2:56
3.	"What You Got" (Griffin, Raphi)	Dert	2:40
4.	"Her Story" (Jamie, Elsie, Zane One)	Dert	3:19
5.	"Let the Light Through" (Propaganda)	Dert	3:13
6.	"Never the Less" (Griffin)	Dert	1:08
7.	"We Just Roll Deep" (Macho, Griffin, Propaganda, Elsie, Jamie, Zane One, Dokument, Raphi)	Dert	2:57
8.	"Planet Dok" (Dokument)	Jermz	3:51
9.	"Disposable" (Sev Statik)	Jason Panucci	2:17
10.	"Misunderstood" (Griffin, Macho, Raphi)	Dert	3:09
11.	"Typical Tunnel Rat Topic (A)" (Propaganda)	Raphi	2:14
12.	"Road to Success" (New Breed)	Dert	3:35
13.	"Forever Yours" (Propaganda, Jamie, Macho)	Raphi	4:17
14.	"Point Taken" (Raphi)	Raphi	2:04
15.	"Slow Your Roll" (Propaganda, Raphi, Zane One)	Dert	4:00
16.	"My Name Is Griffin" (Griffin)	Dert	3:39
17.	"Burn" (Sev Statik)	Raphi	4:13
18.	"Typical Tunnel Rat Topic (B)" (Zane One)	Raphi	1:45
19.	"Behind Closed Doors" (Propaganda, Macho)	Raphi	2:15
20.	"Still Standin'" (Macho, Dokument, Elsie)	Dert	3:48
Total length:			1:01:42

- All scratches by DJ Wise
