= L.A. Woman (Zane One album) =

Studio album by Zane One
- Released: March 10, 2009
- Genre: Christian hip hop, underground hip hop
- Length: 44:07
- Label: AudioSketchBook
- Producer: Dert, Odd Thomas, Tycoon

Singles from L.A. Woman
- 1. "Zane One (L.A. Woman)" Released: July 27, 2010

L.A. Woman is the debut solo album by the American Christian and underground hip hop rapper Zane One. After years of delays during the recording process, the album was released on March 10, 2009, through AudioSketchBook. The title references the album of the same name by the Doors and includes samples of various classic rock and folk songs taken from Zane's vinyl album collection.

== Recording and release ==
Zane recorded material with producer Dert (who is a member of the hip hop collective Tunnel Rats along with Zane) for an album for years, but encountered numerous delays that prevented her from finalizing and releasing a studio album. During the writing and recording process, her marriage began to fail and eventually ended in divorce. This left her a single mother and at one point she and her children lived out of a hotel. She also experienced the death of her grandmother in 2008, to whom she dedicated the album. The finished album sat on her work table for over a year before her friend Propaganda, another fellow member of Tunnel Rats, helped organize the album's finalization and release through AudioSketchBook.

The title, L.A. Woman, refers both to the album by the Doors and to the album concept of Zane being a resident of the Los Angeles area. Zane stated in an interview that she does not listen to a lot of hip hop music, instead preferring folk music and "old hippie stuff", and producer Dert sampled classic rock and folk favorites from Zane's collection of vinyl albums to produce the album. Zane expressed that this gave these songs a whole new meaning. Lyrically, the album features topics pertaining to faith, womanhood, and living as a single mother. The album was released on March 10, 2009, through AudioSketchBook. The song "Almost Cut My Hair" was cut from the final release due to sample clearance issues. A version of the album including this excluded track is listed on Zane One's Bandcamp page. A single from the album, "Zane One (L.A. Woman)", was released on July 27, 2010, preceded by a music video of the same track on May 13, 2010.

== Reception ==
Nina Del from the Christian hip hop website DaSouth.com gave a glowing review of the album, with her major complaint being that the album was too short. She considers Zane to be "one of the only artists I know that hooks you in after the first bar and then uses the actual hook to make you pause for a minute or two more." In addition to Zane's skills as a rapper, she praised the production from Dert, who she considers the most stylistically diverse producer apart from S1. In addition to the variety of samples on the recording, the musical styles range from reggae (on "Kingdom") to electronic ("Give Mama A Kiss") to boom bap ("Again and Again", "Los Angeleez") to evoking music of the 1960s ("Heading Back"). The Christian hip hop website Rapzilla considered it one of the best releases of the year.

== Track listing ==
No.	Title	Producer	Length
1.	"Nostalgia pt.1" (featuring Sojourn)	Dert	1:41
2.	"Give Mamma a Kiss" (featuring Propaganda)	Odd Thomas	3:40
3.	"Kingdom" (featuring Raphi aka Big Shame)	Dert	3:57
4.	"Heading Back"	Dert	3:10
5.	"Again and Again"	Dert	2:41
6.	"Plan B" (featuring Carlos Romo)	Dert	3:32
7.	"Throwdown" (featuring Raphi)	Dert	3:00
8.	"Tell Me Why" (featuring Propaganda)	Tycoon	3:13
9.	"Not Anymore" (featuring Dax)	Dert	2:51
10.	"Los Angeleez"	Dert	3:16
11.	"Don't Let Your Daughters..."	Dert	3:25
12.	"Zane One"	Dert	2:25
13.	"Nostalgia pt.2" (featuring Sojourn)	Dert	7:16
Total length:			44:07

Zane One Bandcamp version
No.	Title	Producer	Length
14.	"Almost Cut My Hair"	Dert	3:04
Total length:			47:11
