= Ill Harmonics =

American hip hop group

- Origin: Dallas, Texas
- Genres: Christian hip hop
- Years active: 1995–present
- Labels: Bishara, Infuse, Uprok
- Members: Playdough; Blake Knight; Gib
- Website: becrecordings.com/artists/195/Ill_Harmonics/

Ill Harmonics is a Christian hip hop band from Dallas, Texas, formed in 1995 by Playdough and Blake Knight. In 2004, Gib, the brother of Blake Knight, joined the group as a drummer. Ill Harmonics has released four studio albums, An Octave Above The Original Volume No. 1 (2000), Take Two (2002), Monkey Business (2004), and Modern Heart Exhibit (2007), as well as a compilation sampler album with MG! the Visionary and Soup the Chemist, released in 2000 through Uprok. Both Playdough and Blake Knight have released solo material, and Playdough also performs and records with the supergroup Deepspace5.

== History ==
Playdough and Blake Knight formed Ill Harmonics when the two met in Dallas, Texas, after the two met at their local church. Both artists rap and produce in the group, with Playdough also serving as a guitarist and Blake Knight as a keyboardist and bassist. The duo released some demo recordings, and gained national exposure in 1998 when they made it to the Top 10 on MTV's The Cut. The group was signed to Uprok Records and released their debut album, An Octave Above the Original Volume No. 1 that same year. They also appeared with MG! The Visionary and Soup the Chemist on a sampler album, also released in 2000. Playdough also formed Phonetic Composition with Freddie Bruno, and both artists joined Deepspace5 in 2000.

Ill Harmonics released their second album, Take Two, in 2002. The album featured appearances from DJ Maj, Freddie Bruno, Earthsuit, and Marcos Curiel of P.O.D. In 2004, Tony Gib, the brother of Blake Knight, joined the group as a drummer. Now a trio, Ill Harmonics released Monkey Business, through Infuse, that year. A fourth studio album, Modern Heart Exhibit, followed in 2007, also on Infuse and distributed through Spirit Music. In 2012, the group released a single, "Loneliest Man", through Bishara Entertainment.

== Discography ==
=== Studio albums ===
- An Octave Above The Original Volume No. 1 – 2000
- Take Two – 2002
- Monkey Business – 2004
- Modern Heart Exhibit – 2007

=== Compilations ===
- Uprok Sampler (with MG! The Visionary and Soup the Chemist) – 2000
