= Gabriel Bello =

Gabriel Bienvenido Bello
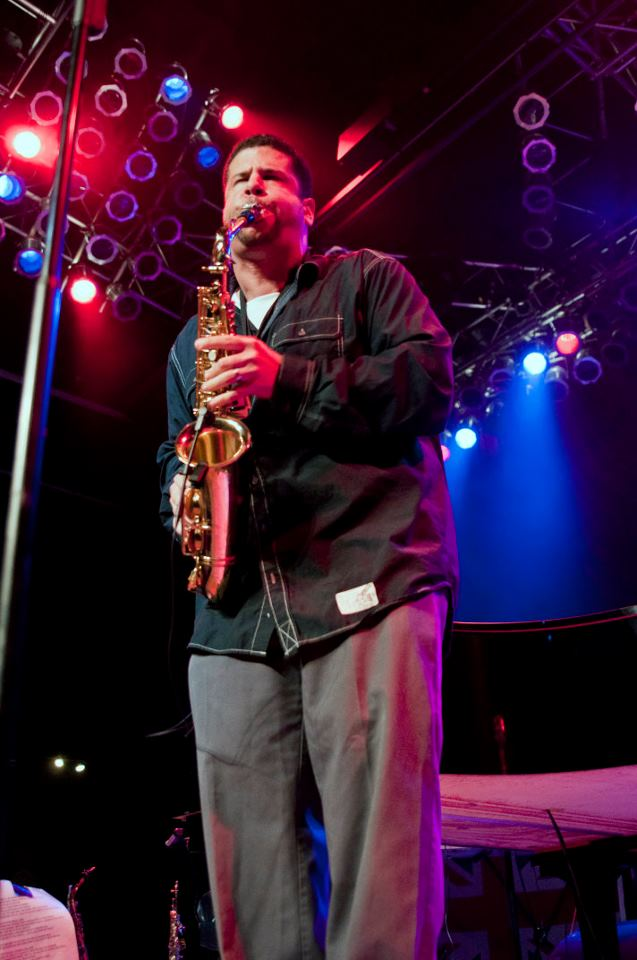
- Bello playing saxophone live

Background information
- Born: Gabriel Bello; June 23, 1980 (age 46); Lawrence, Massachusetts, U.S.A.
- Genres: Christian, Gospel, Jazz, Smooth Jazz
- Occupations: musician, singer-songwriter, saxophonist, producer, composer
- Years active: 2004–present
- Website: gabrielbellomusic.com

Gabriel Bello (born June 23, 1980) is an American smooth jazz saxophonist, vocalist and keyboardist. In addition to performing, Bello is also a producer and arranger. His production credits include "Until You Come Back to Me" by Crystal Dove, "Inside out" by Temar Underwood, and "Times of Refreshing" by Pastor James R Adams.

== Biography ==
=== Early years ===
Bello was born in Lawrence, Massachusetts the second of four children. Both of his parents immigrated to the United States from the Dominican Republic. His family relocated to DeLand, Florida where he grew up singing and playing in his church choir at The Sanctuary DeLand Church of God. He began playing flute at 11, alto saxophone at 13 and piano at 18. While studying music at Lee University in Cleveland, Bello was diagnosed with Hodgkins disease and left school for six months of chemotherapy and radiation therapy. He recovered, and attributing this to playing a concert/service with Christian Worship Artist Ron Kenoly, he went right into full-time ministry. While working full-time with local churches in North Carolina and Virginia Bello honed his skills as a producer, arranger and audio engineer. He then moved to Nashville, Tennessee to further sharpen his skills as a song writer and learn the ropes of the music business. During his time in Nashville he was picked to be one of two candidates to be right off American Idol Carrie Underwood's music director.

=== Currently ===
Bello released his self-titled debut album in 2011 at No. 1 on the smooth jazz charts on billboard and on August 20, 2011, "Gabriel Bello" went to No. 1 on the jazz album Billboard charts beating out Michael Bublé for the spot, and remained there for nine weeks. He also produced, mixed, mastered and played on "Times of Refreshing" by Pastor James R. Adams and the Abounding Life Church of God in Christ Choir & Musicians which reached No. 4 on the gospel albums Billboard charts.

On March 7, 2012, Bello was presented with a SESAC Honors Award for the success of his album in New York City along with many others representing the publishing company.

In 2013 Bello released his first Christian/Gospel album and second solo release entitled Miracle. He was a featured artist at the "Unity Christian Festival" with Israel Houghton & New Breed, Tasha Cobbs, and Jekalyn Carr and the iWorship concert series with Tye Tribbett, Kierra Sheard, and KJ Scriven.

Bello has also been touring with the US with Billy Joel Tribute Band The Stranger and started his own Tribute Band to Stevie Wonder called Natural Wonder.

== Discography ==
Solo albums:

- 2011: Gabriel Bello
- 2013: Miracle

Featuring or produced by Bello:

- 2005 "Abishai" Abishai featuring Gabriel Bello - Producer, Composer, Vocals, Keyboards, Saxophone, Programming, Mixing, Mastering
- 2005 "Plastic Pink Flamingos" Nick Granato - Vocal Producer, Mixing
- 2007 "Seasons of my heart" Pamala Stanly - Vocal Producer, Programming
- 2007 "Until you come back to me" Crystal Dove - Producer, Composer, Keyboards, Programming, Mixing, Mastering
- 2007 " Inside Out" Temar Underwood - Producer, Composer, Keyboards, Programming, Mixing, Mastering
- 2010 "I am there" Stanley Rogers & Young - Producer, Keyboards, Arranger, Saxophones, Flute, Mixing, Mastering
- 2011 "You are My God" Princeton Church of God Mass Choir(featuring Gabriel Bello) - Producer, Keyboards, Programming, Saxophone, Arranger, Composer, Mixing, Mastering
- 2011 "Times of Refreshing" Pastor James R. Adams & The Abounding Life C.O.G.I.C. Mass Choir & Musicians(Billboard #4 Top Gospel Album) - Producer, Arranger, Saxophone, Mixing, Mastering
- 2012 "Show Me Your Glory" Denis Ekobena - Producer, Composer, Background Vocals, Saxophone, Keyboards Programming, Mixing, Mastering
- 2013 "Coram Deo" Cindy Kessler - Producer, Composer, Background Vocals, Keyboards Programming, Mixing, Mastering
- 2013 "Chill Lounge" Aston Grey Project - Saxophone
