= Peace 586 =

American Christian rapper and producer

- Born: Rene Vasquez; November 5, 1968 (age 57); The Bronx, New York, U.S.
- Origin: Corona, California
- Genres: Christian hip-hop, underground hip-hop, instrumental hip-hop
- Occupations: Rapper, producer
- Years active: Late 1980s–present
- Labels: Broken; Brainstorm Artists International; Sphere of Hip-Hop; Uprok; Illect

Rene Vasquez (born November 5, 1968), known by the stage name Peace 586 (and formerly MC Peace), is an American Christian hip-hop producer and emcee. His career began in the late 1980s, and has continued until the present.

As a beatmaker, who has also rapped, Peace 586 is best known for expressing his Christian faith. He has made a mark with his signature, sample-based production style and down-to-earth lyrical content. His name is derived from the month and year that he became a Christian: May 1986.

== Career ==
Peace 586 was first known as "MC Peace" in the late 1980s, while recording with J.C. and the Boyz. Freedom of Soul was formed later, a partnership with DJ Cartoon (Victor Everett) that resulted in two albums (Caught in a Land of Time and The 2nd Comin'), and considerable attention in the early 1990s. The development of Freedom of Soul’s fan base was helped by the affiliation with other popular Christian hip-hop artists at the time, including: SFC (Soldiers for Christ), Dynamic Twins and I.D.O.L. King. Peace would eventually follow other pursuits in the mid-1990s, making way for more collaboration with emcees Theory & Jurny of LPG. They produced their landmark album, The Earthworm (1994), and becoming a member of the Tunnel Rats crew.

From that time on, he produced for the Tunnel Rats, along with his own solo projects starting with The Risen Son (1996). After a number of years, a new album was released via Sphereofhiphop (and later re-released on Uprok Records), simply titled 586 (2001). A markedly less-collaborative effort than his initial solo offering, which heavily featured the Tunnel Rats, 586 is said to have been largely produced and recorded in five days. The album Generations (2003) was thought to be a retirement from rap, and saw a reunion with musical peers from early on.

His re-entry album, heAr (2009), marked a significant turn in his artistry. It was the first in a series of instrumental beat tapes to feature guest vocals by other MCs, with no rhymes from the artist himself. The following album, aBle, was released in 2010. aBle featured two songs ("The Battery" and "Children") that were indicative of a new recording project to be officially announced in February 2011, with Peace 586 on the beats and Jurny Big on the rhymes (together known as The Battery).

=== Collaborators ===
Peace has worked and/or collaborated with many artists throughout his career. Among them are: Ahmad (4th Avenue Jones), Anointed (produced by Mario Winans), Ajax Starglider, Brainwash Projects, B-Twice, Clever MC, Crystal Lewis, Dert, Dynamic Twins, Gene Eugene, Freestyle Fellowship, Future Shock, I.D.O.L. King, The Innernationals, Jon Gibson, Jurny Big, LPG, Mass Reality, New Breed, P.I.D., Pigeon John, Propaganda, Raphi, RationaL, Remnant, Saturday Night Freestyle, Sev Statik, SFC, Timothy "rocdomz" Trudeau, Sojourn, Soup the Chemist, T-Bone and Zane.
