= Whispermoon =

Studio album by Listener
- Released: July 29, 2003
- Genre: Hip hop
- Length: 58:42
- Label: Mush Records
- Producer: Dust, Fred Bruno, Gruntwork, Ill, Listener

Listener chronology
Whispermoon (2003)	Ozark Empire (2005)

Professional ratings
Review scores
Source	Rating
AllMusic	3/5 stars
Dusted Magazine	favorable
Exclaim!	favorable
Pitchfork	6.6/10
Stylus Magazine	C

Whispermoon is the debut studio album by Listener. It was released on Mush Records on July 29, 2003. It peaked at number 163 on the CMJ Radio 200 chart and at number 4 on CMJ's Hip-Hop chart.

== Critical reception ==
Jason MacNeil of AllMusic gave the album 3 stars out of 5, saying, "Not as polished or glossy as bigger rap stars, this record has a certain independent aura around it." Rollie Pemberton of Pitchfork gave the album a 6.6 out of 10 and said, "The saving grace of Whispermoon is its varied production."

== Track listing ==
No.	Title	Length
1.	"The Moon Cries Out"	0:42
2.	"FYI"	4:42
3.	"You're So Underground"	4:40
4.	"Emotional"	3:22
5.	"Winter Life"	2:01
6.	"Train Song"	5:18
7.	"Decadence"	4:55
8.	"I'm Beginning to Hear Whispers"	2:42
9.	"Ways of the Wind"	4:45
10.	"You Will Be My Music"	3:56
11.	"Behind These Doors"	5:38
12.	"Wundering"	3:05
13.	"Crystal Methods"	4:14
14.	"It's a Lonely World"	4:19
15.	"Untitled"	4:29
