= The Battle for L.A.: Footsoldiers, Vol. 1 =

2004 documentary film about the Los Angeles battle rap scene

- Directed by: Darren Doane
- Produced by: Darren Doane; Shane C. Drake; Dax Reynosa
- Cinematography: Darren Doane; Natalie Doane; Shane C. Drake; Justin Tyler
- Edited by: Shane C. Drake
- Production companies: Tunnelrat Productions; Xdoanex
- Distributed by: Redline Entertainment
- Release date: 20 January 2004
- Running time: 48 minutes

The Battle for L.A.: Footsoldiers, Vol. 1 is a 2004 documentary film by Darren Doane about battle rapping and hip hop culture in the Los Angeles area. It was produced by Doane, Shane C. Drake, and Dax Reynosa, and executive produced by Natalie Doane and Josh Karchmer.

== Filming ==
The film consists of interviews and footage filmed in July 2003 at the Green Club in Venice, Da Poetry Lounge, Hollywood, and various streets in Los Angeles. Some of the featured artists include Reynosa's fellow Tunnel Rats members Propaganda, Raphi, Zane, Jamie, as well as IN-Q, Relentless, and Pariah. The film also includes footage of turntablists and freestyle b-boys. Doane, known for his music video direction, had intended the film as the first in a series of documentaries of battle rap across the United States. For this first film, Doane says that he "wanted to peel back the surface layer of what's going on" and emphasize the "raw spirit" of the Westcoast battle rap scene. He created the film after encountering difficulty finding a video about battle rap on the Internet.

== Critical reception ==
Journalists noted the film's emphasis on street hip hop and raw battling, and praised its highlighting the diversity of the Los Angeles scene by including male and female, black, white, Hispanic, and Asian American artists. Jim Farber of New York Daily News noted the comradery among the artists even as they compete against one another, a contrast to the documentary Beef, which chronicles hateful rivalries between prominent hip-hop artists. The indie hip hop website Thug Life Army opined that the film was an excellent look at the Westcoast battle scene, with the shortcomings being some audio issues and the short length of the documentary. They rated the film 9 out of 10. The Orlando Weekly felt that the film as a standalone film "suffers from a self-important myopia" which was rescued by the intention that it be the first in a series. They found the vérité style and "breakneck edits" to be demanding on the viewer. However, they also felt that the energy of the rappers and their dramatic and engaging battles more than made up for the stylistic shortcomings, with Doane's chosen style also aiding in the tension of the scenes.

== Credits ==
- Darren Doane – Director, cinematography
- Carlos Aguilar – Bookworm Brown
- Johnson Barnes – Blu
- Terrence Cedrics – DJ Jedi
- Leon Anthony Clayborne – Brotha Dvooa
- Ralph Henley – Big Shame/Raphi Henly, also music supervisor
- Albert Olguin – Jurny Big
- Ralph Perez – Relentless
- Jason Petty – Propaganda
- Zane Reynosa – Zane
- Julio Cesar Rivas – Lil Cesar
- Darren Doane – producer
- Natalie Doane – executive producer
- Shane C. Drake – producer, cinematography, film editing
- Josh Karchmer – executive producer
- Dax Reynosa – producer
- Natalie Doane – cinematography
- Justin Tyler – cinematography
- Shawn Copley – sculptor
