= Manchild (rapper) =

- Also known as: Soulheir the Manchild, MC
- Born: Gregory Scott Owens
- Origin: Atlanta, Georgia, United States
- Genres: Christian hip hop, underground hip hop
- Occupation: Rapper
- Years active: 1998–present
- Website: www.manchildinsider.com

Gregory Scott Owens, commonly known by his stage name Manchild (sometimes abbreviated as MC and previously known as Soulheir the Manchild) is an American Christian rapper who works within the Christian hip hop genre. He fronts the underground and Christian hip hop group Mars ILL, is part of the Deepspace5 supergroup collective, and has collaborated with the likes of Christian rappers KJ-52 and John Reuben.

== Name ==
Manchild describes the origin of the name Soulheir in "Manchild Speaks" (a spoken word interlude found on The Ringleader by DJ Maj): "I used to know this cat named Soulheir / But I offed him, now I use his name often / Manchild is the cat that you wanna be quotin'."

== Website ==
In February 2008, Manchild announced on Mars ILL's forum that he was starting up Manchildinsider.com, originally a subscription only site that featured five new songs for $5 every month, with an option to pay for the entire year for $50. In September, the blog was made public, with only the songs themselves sent privately to members who've signed up for the songs. "After starting up and running an independent label and all it entails, and after essentially being signed to a major [EMI] through Gotee, I knew it was time for a different chapter of releasing new music," Manchild told PerformerMag about why he decided to sell his music this way.

In 2009, Manchild and Sean P released a collaborative album, Move Merchants, a name they also adopted for themselves, that includes some tracks that are explicitly Catholic hip hop.

== Guest appearances ==
Artist	Title	Album	Year
Braille Brizzy	"Microphone Rush"	Shades of Grey	2004
Fred B	"Quake 3"	Ballpoint Composer EP	2002
Change	"She Was"	Tuesday Mournings	2005
Minamina Goodsong	"Pollen"	Four Farmer Circus	2005
GRITS	"We Don't Play"	Dichotomy B	2004
KJ-52	"Why"	Collaborations	2002
Listener	"FYI"	Whispermoon	2003
Listener	"Decadence"	Whispermoon	2003
Listener	"The Leaf Sure Is Heavy, But You Have to Turn it Over"	Just in Time For Christmas	2005
DJ Maj	"Street Credibility "	Full Plates: Mixtape. 002	2001
DJ Maj	"Uappeal"	BoogiRoot	2005
MG! The Visionary	"Tis So Sweet"	Sinner's Prayer	2000
MG! The Visionary	"Liteshine (Declaring War)"	Sinner's Prayer	2000
MG! The Visionary	"Heart of Worship"	Sinner's Prayer	2000
John Reuben	"Thank You"	Hindsight	2002
Playdough, Jurny, Raphi & Macho	"You Don't Want That"	Underground Rise, Volume 1: Sunrise/Sunset	2003
Sev Statik & DJ Dust	"Walk Alone"	Back to Dust	2007
Viktor Vaughn	"R.A.P. G.A.M.E."	Venomous Villain	2004
Ohmega Watts	"The Treatment"	The Find	2005

== Deepspace5 contributions ==
The Future Ain't What It Used To Be

- From The Outside (4:28)
- Spit Shine (4:16)
- Lord Willing (5:01)
- Black Magic (4:00)
- Ohgeez (4:34)
- Punch Drunk (4:38)
- Killing With Kindness (3:41)
- Beat The Rap (5:17)
- Natural Selection (4:32)
- All You Can Eat (4:13)
- Geronimo (4:44)
- Body Double (3:20)
- And It Was Good (7:00)
- Where Amazing Happens (5:45)

Deepspace5oul (DeepspaceSoul)

- Deepspace 5oul
- Lip Service remix
- The Founder
- Double Dog Dare You
- Downtown Connects

Unique Just Like Everyone Else

- Talk Music
- Wingspan
- Mechanical Advantage
- Truth Be Told
- Half Hearted
- One and the Same
- City Scaping
- I Don't Make It
- Brilliant
- Start Right Here
- The Last One
- One for the Road
- People are people - single

The Night We Called It a Day

- The Night We Called It a Day
- Elementary
- Stick This in Your Ear
- Take the Rhythm
- This Curse I Bear
- Ziontific
- World Go Round
- FWords
- Thinking By Numbers
- If Tomorrow Starts Without Me

DeepSpace5 EP

- Create To Devastate
- Voice of the Guns
- Hall of Justice
- Dwell in Possibility
- If I Laugh
- Universal
