= Life (KRS-One album) =

Studio album by KRS-One
- Released: June 13, 2006
- Recorded: November 2005–March 2006
- Genre: Hip-hop
- Length: 43:35
- Label: Antagonist Records
- Producers: Dax Reynosa (exec.); The Resistance

KRS-One chronology
Keep Right (2004)	Life (2006)	Hip Hop Lives (2007)

Professional ratings
Review scores
Source	Rating
AllMusic	3/5 stars
Robert Christgau	A−
HipHopDX	3.5/5
IGN	6.8/10
RapReviews	8/10

Life is the eighth solo studio album by American rapper KRS-One. It was released on June 13, 2006 via Antagonist Records. Produced by the Resistance, it features guest appearance from the Footsoldiers. The album received generally positive reviews from music critics.

== Track listing ==
No.	Title	Writer(s)	Producer(s)	Length
1.	"Bling Blung"	Lawrence Parker; Don Baker; Dax Reynosa	The Resistance	3:33
2.	"The Way We Live"	Parker; Baker; Reynosa	The Resistance	3:21
3.	"Woke Up"	Parker; M. Aaron Moss; Reynosa	The Resistance; Habit (co.)	3:05
4.	"Mr. Percy" (featuring Triune)	Parker; Orlando Solano; Baker; Reynosa	The Resistance	4:22
5.	"Fucked Up"	Parker; Baker; Reynosa	The Resistance	3:31
6.	"Freedom" (featuring Ishues)	Parker; Ishmeal Cuthbertson; Baker; Reynosa	The Resistance	3:33
7.	"I'm on the Mic"	Parker; Baker; Reynosa	The Resistance	4:05
8.	"Gimme Da Gun" (featuring Raphi)	Parker; Raphael Henley; Baker; Reynosa	The Resistance	2:28
9.	"Life Interlude"	Parker; Baker; Reynosa	The Resistance	1:54
10.	"I Ain't Leavin'" (featuring Propaganda)	Parker; Jason Petty; Solano; Baker; Reynosa	The Resistance	3:56
11.	"Organ Break"	Parker; Baker; Reynosa	The Resistance	1:11
12.	"I Am There"	Parker; Baker; Reynosa	The Resistance	2:29
13.	"Still Slippin'"	Parker; Baker; Reynosa	The Resistance	2:26
14.	"My Life"	Parker; Baker; Reynosa	The Resistance	3:41
Total length:				43:35

== Personnel ==
- Lawrence "KRS-One" Parker – main artist
- Theresa Jones – additional vocals (track 2)
- Orlando "Triune" Solano Jr. – featured artist (track 4), additional vocals (track 6)
- Ishmeal "Ishues" Cuthbertson – featured artist (track 6)
- Dax Reynosa – additional vocals (track 6), producer, executive producer
- Nazareth "DJ Rhettmatic" Nirza – scratches (track 7)
- Raphael "Raphi" Henley – featured artist (track 8)
- DJ Wize – scratches (track 9)
- Jason "Propaganda" Petty – featured artist (track 10)
- Donald "Dert" Baker – producer, design, layout
- Habit – co-producer (track 3)
- Justin "Dubb" Taylor – mixing
- Chad Blinman – mastering
