= DJ Dust =

American DJ

Nathan William Corrona, known as DJ Dust, is the DJ and producer for the underground hip-hop groups Mars ILL and Deepspace5. DJ Dust is known for his hard hitting "boom bap" style of production, often mixing samples from obscure 1960s and 1970s guitar and drum driven records.

Manchild, his MC, has been quoted in saying that "Dust is the creative force behind Mars ILL."

Corrona was the DJ for deadpoetsociety, a hip hop group based out of Indianapolis. The group consisted of three members, Nate Corrona (DJ Dust), Michael Porter (Rahlo), and Joel Wilson (Thin King), and performed at various venues in and around Indianapolis and the Mid-West from 1995 to 1999. In 1998, Nate attended a hip hop conference in Florida and met Greg Owens, who was at the time an MC for The Pride, living in Atlanta. Owens was then asked to be a part of deadpoetsociety and subsequently toured with the group until around the end of 1999. At that point, Wilson had left the group to return to his home in England, and the three current members all decided to change the group name because, as Owens mentioned in an interview, "there [are] a lot of Dead Poets Society's around.". Nate then decided to move to Atlanta, feeling that the group would have better opportunities in that city, musically and ministry-wise.

After directing a few videos himself for Mars ILL, Dust has since directed many other videos for various artists and music groups, through his production company Dustbrand Films.

== Discography ==
For DJ Dust's Mars ILL discography, see Mars ILL.

Other productions, outside of Mars ILL:

- No Fame (2006)
- Dust Collecting Volume One (2007) (instrumentals from Mars ILL, Deepspace5, and Sintax.the.Terrific)
- Back to Dust (2008) Collaboration with Sev Statik of Deepspace5
