= Tunnel Vision (Tunnel Rats album) =

Studio album by Tunnel Rats
- Released: October 25, 2001
- Genres: Christian hip hop, underground hip hop
- Length: 70:34
- Label: UpRok
- Producers: Damion Reed, Dert, Raphi, Dax Reynosa

Tunnel Rats chronology
Experience (1996)	Tunnel Vision (2001)	Underground Rise Vol. 1: Sunrise/Sunset (2003)

Tunnel Vision is the second studio album by West Coast underground hip hop collective Tunnel Rats, released on October 25, 2001, through Uprok Records. Featuring a brash, aggressive sound, the album drew admiration from critics and proved highly influential for the Christian hip hop movement.

== Style and lyrics ==
Tunnel Vision features an aggressive, underground sound. Jason Young of RapReviews.com noted that the collective consists of blacks, whites, and Latinos, men and women, thus offering a diverse sound. Young said that on the album's title track, rapper Macho channels an "early-1990s LL Cool J" sound, and considered the decision to change tempo for the track's bridge was "pure genius." Of rapper Raphi, Young mentioned that he "does his best Slim Shady impersonation on his solo joint, 'Motivate', albeit with some decidedly un-Eminem lyrics." Exclaim!'s Thomas Quinlan's called "Motivate" "Timbaland-influenced", "Human Race" as mariachi sounding of "Human Race" and considered "Remember" a "testimonial track". Anthony DeBarros of CCM Magazine described Tunnel Vision as hip hop "and occasional R&B", and felt that while Tunnel Rats did not break any new musical ground, the collective had "a knack for using studio tools effectively." He explained that "Zane’s 'Change' floats over a shimmering electric piano, and 'For the Heads' evokes a jazzy nostalgia with an acoustic piano loop and simulated record-groove clicks and pops."

Russ Breimeier of Christianity Today described the Tunnel Rats' style as "modern hip-hop that blends melodic hooks and world music sounds to the rap and beats." Breimeier cited "Motivate" as an example of Tunnel Rats' innovative sound, as the song blends "rapid machine-gun rapping with a Latin-sounding melodic hook, smartly programmed drums, and (get this) a harpsichord." Breimeier also referenced "Sev Statik", which bathes its sound in strings and Middle Eastern instruments, and "Ladies", which "tackles biblical feminism with the same spirit that Salt n' Pepa brought to the topic years ago." In discussing the challenging lyrical content of the album, Breimeier highlighted "2 Cents", which used "jazz-soaked hip hop" to tackle the issue of Christians being too quick to judge, the "dissonant sounding" track "Finish Line", which Breimeier considered "a smart rephrasing of I Corinthians 9:24–27", and the catchy "Master Plan", which he viewed as offering a sobering statement of the world as per the Book of Jeremiah. Cross Rhythms's Sam Gunnell stated that "Each track has its own individual sound and content but each possesses the usual hard hitting and challenging lyrics" and noted that the final track has an "R&B vibe".

== Reception ==
Professional ratings
Review scores
Source	Rating
AllMusic	3/5 stars
CCM Magazine	3.5/5 stars
Cross Rhythms	9/10 squares
The Phantom Tollbooth	4.5/5 stars
RapReviews.com	8.5/10

Jason Birchmeier of AllMusic rated the album three stars out of five, stating that it highlights the Tunnel Rats "anti-commercial approach to hip-hop, showcasing intelligent rhymes, creative beats, and original songwriting." CCM Magazine's Anthony DeBarros rated the album three-point-five out of five, concluding that "The self-referential braggadocio wears thin after a while, but not enough to dull this otherwise fine piece of art." Sam Gunnell of Cross Rhythms gave the album nine out of ten squares and expressed that the album showcases some of the best female rappers he had ever heard. Gunnell cited "Motivate" as his favorite song on the album, but also recommended the tracks "Ladies", "2 Cents", and the album's final, hidden track. Tony LaFianza of The Phantom Tollbooth rated the album four-point-five out of five, stating that "These 22 tracks of seriously inventive music and reality, put Tunnel Rats on the point of hip hop, and make Tunnelvision the best rap record of the year." Thomas Quinlan from Exclaim! while the album is not always successful, "there are some songs that prove that rap and Christianity are no longer mutually exclusive". Quinlan listed "T.R.'z", "Sev Statik", and "Pray for Morning" as the best songs on the album.

RapReviews.com's Jayson Young rated the album eight-point-five out of ten, stating that "I can't say enough good things about 'Tunnel Vision'." Young highlighted the tracks "T.R.z", "For the Heads", "Bow Down", and "Chainge" as examples of Dert's excellent production, and stated that LPG, a duo consisting of Jurny and Dax, provide the backbone for the group. Young also noted Sev Statik, whom he considered "much improved" compared to his appearances with "Uprok's equally-impressive" Deepspace 5 collective. Young lavished praise on female rappers Zane and Elsie, stating that they "are two of the most talented women I have ever heard bless the mic, and they make me realize what a shame it is that Lil' Kim and Trina's ilk are so much more famous." In particular, he considered Elsie's performance untouchable, proclaiming that he was "happy to say that in a group of MCs as talented as the Tunnel Rats, the BEST MC in the crew is a woman."

Russ Breimeier in a review for Christianity Today called the album "a Christian hip-hop album intent on leading the genre to a new artistic standard". Breimeier also appreciated how the album challenged the artistry and originality of Christian artists, while simultaneously criticizing the lack of integrity and ethics in mainstream music. Despite these praises, Breimeier cautioned that the Tunnel Rats are not for all tastes, and said that some songs do not work as well as others. For instance, Breimeier found "For the Heads" as having "too much ego in it, as well as some questionable words." Nevertheless, Breimeier concluded that "We could use more Christian artists as bold and creative as Tunnel Rats."

== Dispute with Cross Movement ==
In an article on the Tunnel Rats, Imade Nibokun of LA Weekly considered Tunnel Vision a response to criticisms the group received from East Coast hip hop group The Cross Movement. In 2001, The Tonic, a member of The Cross Movement, in an interview accused the Tunnel Rats of placing more importance on musical credibility than sharing the Gospel. Fans of The Cross Movement also criticized The Tunnel Rats, claiming that they did not distinguish themselves enough from aggressive, secular West Coast rappers. Nibokun wrote that the turbulent sound on Tunnel Vision "embraced everything that the conservatives hated" and "was a musical middle finger to anyone who found their battle-rap bravado sinful." In particular, she noted the opening line by Dax on the song "T.R.'z", which criticizes Christian rappers with sub-par musical ability: "I pull a pistol out my pocket and I cock it."

== Influence ==
Imade Nibokun noted in LA Weekly that "T.R.'z" "abrasive sound effects and full drums" succeeded "as something of a wake-up call to a still relatively staid genre." Imade explains of Tunnel Vision that "Yes, there were spiritual references... ...but the work felt raw. Critics were impressed, and a whole generation of Christian emcees took note."

== Music video ==
A music video for the song "T.R.'z" was released. According to member Raphi (a.k.a. Shames Worthy), the video was shot on 35 mm film in an old railroad tunnel in Los Angeles, with a budget of $10,000 USD. It included features of b-boy Ivan the Urban Action Figure and graffiti artists Frustr8, Pryer (UTI) and Skill 1.

== Track listing ==
All production by Dert, except "Motivate" by Raphi and "Bow Down" and "Pray for the Morning" by Dert and Damion Reed

No.	Title	Length
1.	"A Long Road" (Macho)	1:54
2.	"T.R.'z"	4:12
3.	"Bow Down" (Macho, Dax, Raphi)	3:31
4.	"Jet Lag (Interlude)"	0:11
5.	"Sev Statik" (Sev Statik)	3:53
6.	"One's Who Do" (Dax)	1:16
7.	"Ladies" (Elsie, Zane)	3:55
8.	"2 Cents" (Dax, Raphi, Zane, Macho)	4:25
9.	"Tunnel Vision" (New Breed)	3:48
10.	"God Said It (Interlude)"	0:17
11.	"Line Finish" (Sev Statik, Elsie, Jurny)	3:35
12.	"For the Heads" (Raphi, Sev Statik)	3:06
13.	"Motivate" (Raphi)	4:40
14.	"Tripped Over a Dream" (Jurny, Elsie, Zane, Dax)	4:40
15.	"One's Who Don't" (Raphi)	1:16
16.	"Master Plan" (Macho)	4:39
17.	"Pray for the Morning" (Raphi, Macho)	4:09
18.	"Chainge" (Zane)	3:56
19.	"Human Race" (Raphi, Elsie, Jurny)	4:10
20.	"Everybody Else" (Macho)	1:23
21.	"Remember" (LPG)	3:54
22.	"[Hidden Track]"	3:44
Total length:		70:34
