= Sivion =

- Also known as: Vision
- Born: Gary James Watson; May 11, 1972 (age 54); Oklahoma City, Oklahoma
- Origin: Dallas, Texas
- Genre: Christian hip hop
- Occupations: Singer, songwriter, author, rapper, poet
- Instruments: Vocals, Saxophone, Flute
- Years active: 1990–present
- Label: Illect
- Website: illect.com

Gary James Watson (born May 11, 1972), who goes by the stage name Sivion, formerly Vision, is an American Christian hip hop musician and member of the hip hop supergroup collective Deepspace5. He was also a member of the duo Phat K.A.T.S., which he formed with his brother, who goes by the name Wushu. He has released four studio albums, Spring of the Songbird (2006), Mood Enhancement (2006), Butterfly Sessions with Dert (2010), and Group Therapy (2013), as well as additional live and remix albums and an EP.

== Early life ==
Watson was born Gary James Watson, on May 11, 1972, in Oklahoma City, Oklahoma, with his twin brother, Terry Edward Watson, who is also a Christian rapper, going by the name Wushu. He grew up splitting time in Dallas, Texas and Gaithersburg, Maryland, as his father's side of the family is from Maryland and his mother's side is from Texas. He went to University of Miami while his twin brother stayed closer to home attending University of North Texas.

== Music career ==
Watson states that he started taking hip hop music seriously as a career in 1990. He formed the project Phat K.A.T.S. with his brother, himself going by the name Vision and his brother by the name Wushu. Watson eventually changed his name to Sivion, as he discovered that there were several other hip hop artists with the moniker "Vision". Watson explains that he decided on the name Sivion after he misspelled his original stage name in an email to his brother. Watson joined the Christian hip hop collective Deepspace5 during the recording session for The Night We Called It a Day. He started his solo music recording career in 2005, with the studio album Mood Enhancement, released through Illect Recordings. A second album, Spring Of The Songbird, released the following year (2006) through Braille's Hip Hop IS Music. He partnered with Dert for the 2010 album Butterfly Sessions, and a fourth studio album, Group Therapy, was released on October 15, 2013, from Illect Recordings. He is part of the hip hop duo, Phat K.A.T.S., with his twin brother, Terry.

== Discography ==
Studio albums

- Mood Enhancement (May 24, 2005, Illect Recordings)
- Spring of the Songbird (June 9, 2006, Hip Hop IS Music)
- Butterfly Sessions with Dert (September 7, 2010, Illect Recordings)
- Group Therapy (October 15, 2013, Illect Recordings)
- Dark Side of the Cocoon (October 6, 2017, Illect Recordings)

Extended plays

- Here We Go / Sivion for President (January 19, 2010, Illect Recordings)

Live albums

- Live at the Gypsy Tea Room (December 12, 2006, Illect Recordings)

Remix albums

- Everything Is Everything / Brand New Day (May 10, 2011, Illect Recordings)
- Older Now (Remixes) (December 6, 2011, Illect Recordings)
- Butterfly Sessions: Remixed (remixed by Freddie Bruno, February 12, 2013, Illect Recordings)
