= Theory Hazit =

American rapper (born 1978)

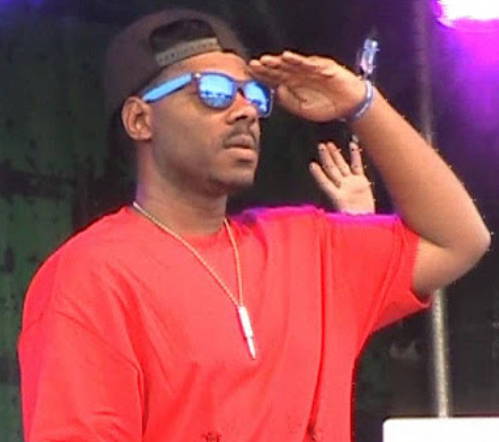
- Washington performing in 2014

Background information
- Born: Thearthur Readié Washington IV; November 3, 1978 (age 47); Winchester, Kentucky, US
- Origin: Cincinnati, Ohio, US
- Genres: Christian hip hop
- Occupations: Rapper; songwriter; record producer
- Years active: 1996–present
- Labels: Groove Attack Productions; Hip Hop Is Music

Thearthur Readié Washington (born November 3, 1978), better known by the stage name Theory Hazit is an American Christian hip hop artist and record producer from Cincinnati, Ohio.

== History ==
Thearthur Readie Washington IV was born in Winchester, Kentucky, on November 3, 1978, to Tenecia Jackson and Thearthur Readie Washington III.

At the time his debut album was released in 2007, Hazit had relocated to Cincinnati, Ohio. This album, entitled Extra Credit, was released on July 17, 2007, in the United States by Groove Attack Productions. It featured production from Tony Stone and Re:Flex the Architect. A review of Extra Credit written in Relevant compared Hazit to Kanye West and Common, as both a producer and an MC. Another review of this album, written by Omar Mouallem for Exclaim!, praised the album's song "I Just Wanna Come Home" for having "lyrics as contagious as its soulful hook." The album was also ranked as the 59th best hip hop album of 2007 by Quentin Huff in PopMatters.

Since then, he has released several additional albums, including Thr3e in 2012. He has also released another album entitled "Fall of the Light Bearer".

== Discography ==
- Extra Credit (2007)
- Lord Fire (2008)
- Modern Marvels (2010) (with Toni Shift)
- Lord Fire 2 (2010)
- The Rock Is Steady (2011)
- Thr3e (2012)
- Monolith Monster (2013)
- The Fall Of The Lightbearer (2015)
- It's Whatever (2017)
- Ravioli & Beatbox (2017)
- Halftime Slow (2017)
- Bless Your Food (2017)
- This Is Damone (2017)
- Uglyface (2017)
- Eye See What You Did There (2017)
- Poor Thing (2017)
- It’s Me, Not You (2017)
- FEELS (2017)
- The Soul Chops (2018)
- I Love It Down Here (2019)
- yall still ain't washin yall hands (2020) (temporarily available)
- The Giraffe Tape (2021)
