= Tunnel Rats (music group) =

American hip hop music collective

- Also known as: T.R.'z
- Origin: Whittier, California
- Genres: Boom bap; Christian hip hop; West Coast hip hop; underground hip hop
- Years active: 1993–present (on hiatus)
- Labels: Brainstorm, Thump, Uprok
- Spinoffs: The Battery; Future Shock; Footsoldiers; Foundation; the Inklings; LPG; New Breed; Resistance; Theresa Jones
- Members: Ahred a.k.a. Redbonz; Ajax Starglider; Dax Reynosa; Dert; Dokument; Elsie; Griffin; JERMZ; Jurny Big; Macho; Peace 586; Propaganda; Raphi (a.k.a. Shames Worthy); Sev Statik; Sojourn; Trey Qel Drama; Triune; Zane
- Past members: Donovan; Jamie; Jerms; JustMe (a.k.a. Sage)

Tunnel Rats is a West Coast underground hip hop collective founded in 1993 in Whittier, California. Named after the tunnel rats in the Vietnam War, the mixed-gender, multi-racial collective consists of some seventeen individual members and incorporates four affiliated groups, LPG, Future Shock, Foundation, and New Breed, which have recorded both within Tunnel Rats and independently. Several members also formed two additional side-projects, Footsoldiers and The Resistance, which recorded one album in 2006 and collaborated with KRS-One. Pioneers in the Christian hip hop genre, Tunnel Rats often met with resistance from church leaders who disliked the collective's aggressive style and felt that Tunnel Rats praised their rapping skills more than glorifying God.

In the early 2000s, the East Coast Christian hip-hop group The Cross Movement likewise criticized Tunnel Rats, claiming it did not place enough emphasis on the Gospel. Due to a high number of Mexican Americans in the collective, Tunnel Rats also encountered racism when performing in the South. Despite these hardships, Tunnel Rats managed to garner critical acclaim and significantly impacted the Christian hip hop movement. The collective has released four albums, plus numerous additional recordings from its affiliated groups and individual members. Though currently on hiatus, Tunnel Rats has not disbanded, according to a statement by member Peace 586.

== History ==
=== Formation ===
The Tunnel Rats formed after rapper Dax Reynosa performed at a graffiti equipment store Hex's Hip Hop Shop. After the performance, he invited about two dozen rappers to his house for an open mic. The performers came from racially diverse backgrounds, a mix of Latinos, whites, and blacks, groups which Reynosa says did not always get along then. Among the standout performers that night were Reynosa's cousin Jurny Big, his sister Zane One, the four-member group Future Shock (consisting of Ahred a.k.a. Redbonz, Ajax Starglider, Sojourn, and DJ Trey-Qel), and Shames Worthy (a.k.a. Raphi), all of whom came together to form the Tunnel Rats. Reynosa was inspired to name the group "Tunnel Rats" after his father, who served in the Vietnam War as a tunnel rat. Ahred, a member of Future Shock, stated in an interview that "We just put a name to it and called it Tunnel Rats. In Vietnam, the tunnel rats were the guys who went underground to make sure that the tunnels were clear so the soldiers could go through. We considered ourselves as those guys going first to make the way clear for people to go after us." Reynosa recounts that "we never believed that we were called to emcee or rap, never. We were called to minister."

The Tunnel Rats performed at churches throughout Southern California, and eventually throughout the Northeast and Deep South. While the group found some acceptance from progressive church leaders, who thought that hip-hop might be a way to reach youth, many church leaders took issue with the group's style, which fell somewhere between battle rapping and street preaching, and accused the group of sinfully glorifying their rapping skills as opposed to glorifying God. In addition, the group, consisting predominantly of Mexicans, encountered prejudice when performing in the South. Reynosa recounts how one night in Mississippi, an establishment would not serve the group because some of the members were Mexican. When they went to a Motel 6, member Redbonz screamed "WHY?" continuously into a pillow. "He couldn't believe that we had given up our lives to minister the gospel through rap music and ... had nothing." The group also was paid very little, often not at all, for its church performances, and Raphi recounts that if a church managed to book a hotel for the group, he, as the youngest member, often was relegated to sleep in the bathtub.

=== Early successes ===
Since the mid-1980s, Reynosa and his cousin Jurny Big performed as the duo LPG, and they released The Earthworm in 1995. With breakbeats, melodic riffs, and strong production, the recording broke new ground at a time when most Christian rap was considered a cheesy and watered-down imitator of secular rap, and according to LA Weekly, many consider the album "to be the first gospel-rooted album to feature real hip-hop."

The Tunnel Rats proper released its debut album, Experience, in 1996 on Brainstorm Artists International, and started receiving letters from teenagers who were inspired by the group to leave gangs or excel in school. The group's efforts also started impacting the Christian hip hop genre, which started garnering serious critical attention. In 1997, the Brainstorm label folded, but Tunnel Rats' membership expanded, with Sev Statik of Deepspace5 and the brother-sister duo New Breed joining the group. At this point, the group Future Shock decided to leave Tunnel Rats and go on independently.

=== Dispute with The Cross Movement ===
In 2001, The Tonic, a member of Christian hip hop group The Cross Movement, criticized the Tunnel Rats in an interview, accusing the group of placing more importance on musical credibility than sharing the Gospel. Fans of The Cross Movement also criticized The Tunnel Rats, claiming that they did not distinguish themselves enough from aggressive, secular West Coast rappers. In response to the accusations, Tunnel Rats released Tunnel Vision, which featured a raw, turbulent sound which, according to Imade Nibokun in LA Weekly, "was a musical middle finger to anyone who found their battle-rap bravado sinful." Nibokun cited in particular the song "T.R.'z", which criticizes Christian rappers with sub-par musical ability, where Dax Reynosa aggressively opens with the rapped line "I pull a pistol out my pocket and I cock it".

=== Subsequent successes and hiatus ===
Tunnel Vision impressed critics and influenced a whole generation of Christian rappers. Rapper and poet Propaganda, rapper-producer duo The Foundation (consisting of Dokument and Jermz), and Griffin joined the group in time to record on the Tunnel Rats' next two albums, the compilation Underground Rise, Volume 1: Sunrise/Sunset, released in 2003, and Tunnel Rats, released in 2004. In 2006, Tunnel Rats members Propaganda, Triune, and Raphi joined with rappers Ishues and Random to form Footsoldiers, with Dax Reynosa helping bring the artists, some of whom lived in different parts of the country, together. Dert and Reynosa also formed the production team The Resistance, a production duo consisting of Reynosa and Dert. Footsoldiers and the Resistance collaborated with KRS-One on his album Life, and KRS-One in return appeared on the Footsoldiers' album Live This.

Tunnel Rats currently is on hiatus. In a forum post in 2010, Tunnel Rats producer Peace 586 clarified that although the group has not been active for a long while, it still is together, and cited various personal and family commitments as making it difficult for the group to get together and record.

== Musical style ==
Part of the West Coast underground hip hop scene, Tunnel Rats features "minimalist boom-bap styles, lush, jazzy compositions, and scratch-laden music". On Tunnel Vision, Tunnel Rats embraced an aggressive, turbulent sound. LA Weekly writes that the track "T.R'z." "features abrasive sound effects and full drums, and succeeded as something of a wake-up call to a still relatively staid genre." Russ Breimeier of Crosswalk.com in a review of Tunnel Vision described the Tunnel Rats' style as "modern hip-hop that blends melodic hooks and world music sounds to the rap and beats." Jayson Young of RapReviews.com noted that as the collective consists of men and women, black, whites, and Latinos, it offers a very diverse sound. On the Tunnel Rats' self-titled release, reviewers noted that producer Dert had matured in his sound, pursuing a more mainstream approach and branching out to pursue a more diverse and complex style.

== Influence ==
According to Jason Bellini of Wade-O Radio, the Tunnel Rats were often distinguished by their self-proclaimed title of "rapper-who-were-Christians" as opposed to "Christian rappers", placing a strong value on quality and purity in hip hop art, and a willingness and desire to perform outside churches and compete and collaborate with non-Christians. Bellini compiled a list of seventeen artists influenced by the Tunnel Rats, either directly or indirectly, listing Christon Gray, Lecrae, TheBREAX and Dream Junkies, RedCloud, Propaganda (who even joined the group), Japhia Life, Playdough, LA Symphony and member Pigeon John, High Society (composed of Sho Baraka, Swoope, J.R., and Natalie Lauren), Heath McNease, Heesun Lee, Braille, Scribbling Idiots, Rhema Soul, Shad, and 4th Avenue Jones.

== Discography ==
- Experience - 1996
- Tunnel Vision - 2001
- Tunnel Rats - 2004
- Legacy - 2025

== Filmography ==
Year	Title	Role	Notes
2004	The Battle for L.A.: Footsoldiers, Vol. 1	Themselves	Documentary film, includes features of Propaganda, Raphi, Zane One, Jamie, and Jurny Big
