= New Breed (music duo) =

- Origin: Boston, Massachusetts
- Genres: Christian hip hop, Latin hip hop, underground hip hop
- Labels: UpRok, EMI Christian
- Members: Elsie Ortega; Rosario "Macho" Ortega

New Breed is a Christian Latin hip hop duo from Boston, Massachusetts, consisting of brother and sister Rosario "Macho" and Elsie Ortega. An affiliate of the underground hip hop collective Tunnel Rats, the duo has recorded and toured both as part of the Tunnel Rats and independently. After joining the Tunnel Rats in 1998, New Breed appeared on the DJ Maj mixtape Full Plates with the song "What's My Name" in 2001, and later that year on the Tunnel Rats album Tunnel Vision. The duo released its first album, Stop the Music, in 2002, and then appeared on the Tunnel Rats albums Underground Rise, Volume 1 in 2003 and Tunnel Rats in 2004. A second album from New Breed, Nine, came out in 2004.

== History ==
Elsie and Macho were born in Boston and grew up in a Puerto Rican quarter of Boston. They later moved to Los Angeles, and started rapping together at around age 15 or 16. Macho attempted to put together a showcase for a youth group, and asked his sister to help. They performed an original song, "Time To Make A Difference", to enthusiastic response, and started getting requests for performances. In 1997, Elsie and Macho met the Tunnel Rats at a Cru-vention convention, and Tunnel Rats leader Dax Reynosa asked them to join with his collective. The pair took a year to pray and decide, and the next year met up with the Tunnel Rats in Florida and officially joined the collective.

New Breed first appeared with the song "What's My Name" on DJ Maj mixtape Full Plates: Mixtape. 002. Later that year it recorded as part of Tunnel Rats on the groundbreaking Tunnel Vision, and on February 12, 2002, New Breed released its first album, Stop the Music, through Uprok Records. Critics received the album favorably, noting in particular the album's Latin influence that reflected the Puerto Rican heritage of Elsie and Macho.

New Breed then recorded again with the Tunnel Rats for the 2003 Uprok compilation Underground Rise, Volume 1: Sunrise/Sunset. In 2004, it released Nine and then recorded on the third Tunnel Rats album Tunnel Rats. In 2005, New Breed appeared along with rapper Triune on the song "Texas Hold 'Em" by Dokument, from the album Planet Dok. Macho also released a solo extended play, Freedom, in 2005, and, after a long hiatus, released his debut solo album, Remember, in 2011.
