= Listener (band) =

American rock band

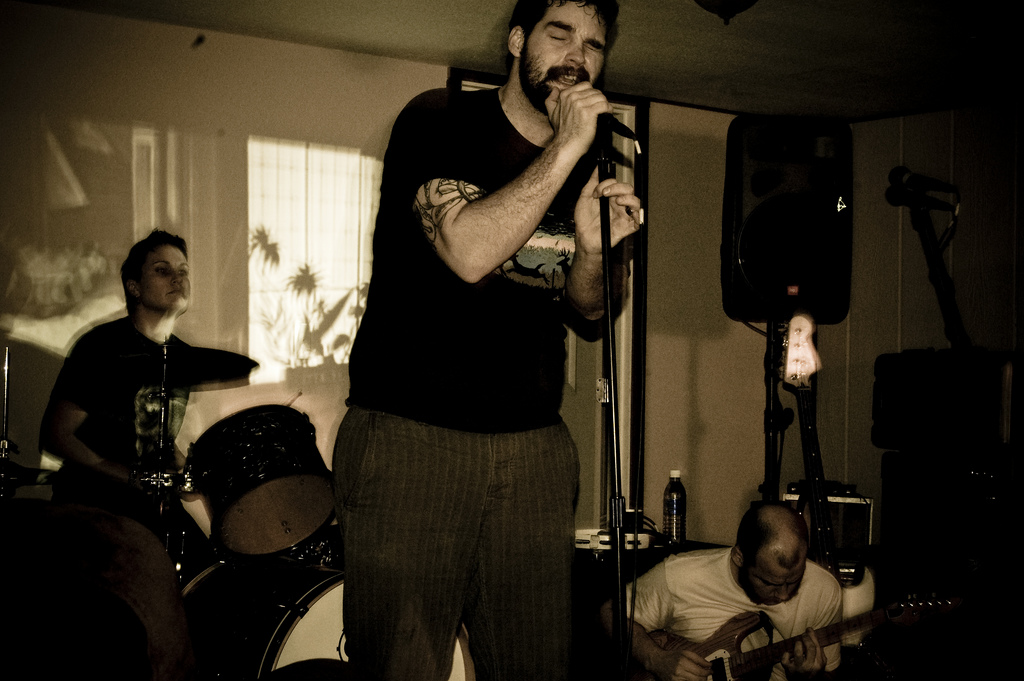
- Listener performing in Portland in 2009

Background information
- Origin: Fayetteville, Arkansas, United States
- Genres: Indie rock; emo; spoken word
- Years active: 2002–present
- Labels: Tangled Talk, Sincere, Homemade Genius, Broken Circles, Mush, Sounds of Subterrania
- Members: Dan Smith; Jon Terrey; Kris Rochelle; Tim Stickrod
- Past members: Andrew Gibbens; Caleb Clendenen; Erik Olsen; Kristen Smith; Wolfgang Robinson; Christin Nelson
- Website: iamlistener.com

Listener is an American spoken word rock band from Fayetteville, Arkansas. Originally a hip hop project by Dan Smith, who used the moniker "Listener", it soon evolved into a full-fledged rock band. The current lineup consists of Smith as vocalist, trumpeter, and bassist together with guitarist Jon Terrey and drummer Kris Rochelle.

== History ==
Listener originally started as a solo underground hip hop project of vocalist Dan Smith beginning with the commercial release of the album Whispermoon on Mush Records in 2003. He has also contributed to several collaborative albums with the groups Deepspace5 and Labklik, both of which he is a founding member of.

With his second release Ozark Empire in 2005, Smith began his first "Tour of Homes". This consisted almost entirely of traveling from home to home around the United States (the European leg of the tour was titled the "European Tour of Homes") in a grassroots style of touring. The European leg consisted more of performing in standard live music venues as well as houses, coffee shops, art galleries and warehouses. It was also during this period that Smith invited drummer Andrew Gibbens and guitarist Erik Olsen to join him on tour, thus starting the transition away from traditional hip-hop performances toward a live band format. Gibbens and Olsen remained until they departed the band in December 2006. Regardless of using the name Listener for his solo work, Smith decided to continue using the name as the project developed into a live band.

It was during the Tour of Homes in 2005 that Smith met musician Christin Nelson at a house show in Las Vegas, Nevada. After finding out that Nelson played drums, Smith asked him to join the group in June 2007 and the band released the album Return to Struggleville.

After a year and a half of touring, Listener released their third studio album, Wooden Heart, in July 2010. Later that year after being introduced to the band The Chariot, Smith was asked to collaborate on the song "David De La Hoz" on the album Long Live, which released in November 2010.

Listener has since released two LPs: 2013's Time Is a Machine and a concept album in 2018 exploring the lives of famed inventors like Nikola Tesla and Robert Oppenheimer entitled Being Empty : Being Filled.

Smith now also works as a talk therapist in Kansas City, Missouri.

== Members ==
Current members

- Dan Smith - vocals, bass, mellophone, cornet
- Kris Rochelle - drums
- Jon Terrey - guitar

Former members

- Christin Nelson - guitar
- Andrew Gibbens - drums
- Caleb Clendenen - guitar
- Erik Olsen - guitar
- Kristen Smith - bass
- Wolfgang Robinson - drums

== Discography ==
=== Albums ===
- Whispermoon (Mush Records, 2003)
- Ozark Empire (Deepspace5 Records, 2005)
- Talk Music (Talk Music Records, 2007)
- Not Waving, Drowning (self-released, 2009)
- Return to Struggleville (Tangled Talk Records/Homemade Genius/Sounds of Subterrania, 2007)
- Wooden Heart (Tangled Talk Records/Sincere Records/Broken Circles/Sounds of Subterrania, 2010)
- Time Is a Machine (Tangled Talk Records/Sounds of Subterrania, 2013)
- Being Empty : Being Filled (Tangled Talk Records/Sounds of Subterrania, 2018)

=== EPs ===
- Listener and Dust – Just in Time for Christmas (Deepspace5 Records, 2005)
- Train Songs (self-released, 2009)
- Being Empty : Being Filled - Volume 1 (Black Basset Records, 2017)

=== Singles ===
- Live on 3FM (self-released, 2013)

=== Music Videos ===
- "Train Song" (2003)
- "Ozark Empire" (2005)
- "Wooden Heart" (2010)
- "Falling in Love with Glaciers" (Ver. 1) (2010)
- "Building Better Bridges" (2011)
- "Falling in Love with Glaciers" (Ver. 2) (2011)
- "It Will All Happen the Way It Should" (2014)
- "Eyes to the Ground for Change" (2014)
- "There's Money In The Walls" (2017)
- "Add Blue" (2017)
- "A Love Letter To Detroit" (2017)
- "Manhattan Projects" (2018)
