= LPG (American band) =

American Christian hip-hop duo

- Origin: Whittier, California
- Genres: Alternative hip hop, Christian hip hop
- Years active: 1983—present
- Labels: Uprok, Brainstorm Artists International, Solar
- Members: Dax Reynosa; Jurny Big

LPG is an American Christian hip-hop duo from Whittier and West Covina, California and part of the underground hip hop collective Tunnel Rats. It is composed of cousins Dax Reynosa (also known as Theory) and Jurny Big (also known as Phil Harmonic). Their name was understood to stand for "Lord's Personal Gangsters", but now is "Living Proof of Grace". They released their first album, Earthworm, in 1995.

Along with Tunnel Rats, they had trouble being accepted by conservatives in the Christian ranks. "There were years of toiling and being called the devil," said Reynosa. "We are ministers of the gospel, but we just happen to rap."

== Discography ==
- The Earthworm (Brainstorm Artists International, 1995)
- 360 Degrees (Solar Music, 1998)
- The Gadfly (Uprok Records, 2003)
