= Freddie Bruno =

- Also known as: Freddie B, Fred B
- Born: David Frederick Washington; August 20, 1978 (age 48); Washington, D.C.
- Origin: Dallas, Texas
- Genre: Christian hip hop
- Occupations: Music producer, rapper, songwriter
- Instrument: Vocals
- Years active: 1997–present
- Labels: Deepspace5, Gotee, Illect, Mega Royal, Uprok

David Frederick Washington (born August 20, 1978), who goes by the stage name Freddie Bruno, is an American Christian hip hop musician and member of the hip hop collective, Deepspace5. He has released two noteworthy studio albums, The Ballpoint Composer in 2002 on Uprok Records, and Hold Music on Illect Recordings, in 2007.

== Early and personal life ==
Washington was born David Frederick Washington on August 20, 1978, in Washington, D.C., where he was raised. His family members are musicians in their own right, his mother is a singer, father is a drummer, and sister is a French horn player. He moved to Dallas, Texas, where his music career began. He got married on April 9, 1999, in Dallas, Texas, to Christina Lisann Kelm.

== Music career ==
His music career began with the Christian hip hop collective, Deepspace5, in 1997. He started his solo music recording career with the studio album, The Ballpoint Composer, released on April 11, 2002, by Uprok Records. He released Hold Music, a second studio album, on May 6, 2007, through Illect Recordings.

== Discography ==
Studio albums

- The Ballpoint Composer (2002, Uprok)
- Hold Music (May 6, 2007, Illect)
