= Krum (rapper) =

American rapper (born 1977)

- Also known as: Harry Krum, Playdough
- Born: Douglas William Krum Jr. April 27, 1977 (age 49); Toledo, Ohio, US
- Origin: Borger, Texas, US
- Genres: Christian hip hop, urban gospel
- Occupations: Singer, songwriter, producer
- Instrument: Vocals
- Years active: 2000–present
- Labels: 7Spin, UpRok, Sony Records, Provident, Deepspace5, Man Bites Dog
- Member of: Deepspace5

Douglas William Krum, Jr. (born April 27, 1977), better known by his stage name Krum (formerly Harry Krum or Playdough), is an American hip hop musician. He's released nine studio albums, one extended play, and three mixtapes in his career.

== Early life ==
He was born Douglas William Krum, Jr., on April 27, 1977, in Toledo, Ohio, to father Douglas William Krum, Sr. and mother Lynn Marie Krum (née Edelstein). He grew up in Fritch, Texas, and as a teen was in a church group called S-Squared where he used the stage name Dynamite D and T-N-T. He was discovered in his early 20’s by Uprok Records while in the group Ill Harmonics, after that group appeared in a movie. This got his music recording career underway.

== Music career ==
He started his music recording career around 2000, when his first studio album, Lonely Superstar, was released by UpRok Records on October 22, 2002. His second studio album, Don't Drink the Water, was released on October 17, 2006, from 7Spin Music. The subsequent release, Goodonya, an extended play, was released by Deepspace5 Recordings on December 18, 2008. His next release, a mixtape entitled Bible Bus, was released independently on June 29, 2010. His third studio album, Writer Dye, was released on November 2, 2010, also independently. He released a fourth studio album, Hotdoggin', on April 26, 2011. His fifth studio album, Writer Dye: Deux or Die, was released on October 22, 2012. A second mixtape, Christopher Collabo with DJ Sean P, was released on January 29, 2013, independently. He released Gold Tips with DJ Sean P, his sixth studio album, on April 8, 2014, through Man Bites Dog Records. A seventh studio album, 1985 Party Time Excellent, was released independently on March 3, 2015. His eighth studio album, We Buy Gold with DJ Sean P, was released on October 16, 2015. His ninth studio album, Blue Eyed Devil was released on February 3, 2017.

== Discography ==
Studio albums

- He’s Reality (1992, Purdue Studios)
- Lonely Superstar (October 22, 2002, UpRok)
- Don't Drink the Water (October 17, 2006, 7Spin, Sony Records)
- Writer Dye (November 2, 2010)
- Hotdoggin' (April 26, 2011, Writer Dye)
- Writer Dye: Deux or Dye (October 22, 2012)
- Gold Tips (April 8, 2014, Man Bites Dog, with Sean Patrick)
- 1985 Party Time Excellent (March 3, 2015, with DJ Sean P)
- We Buy Gold (October 16, 2015, with DJ Sean P)
- Blue Eyed Devil (February 3, 2017)
- Black Lung (April 2, 2021)

EPs

- Goodonya (December 18, 2008, Deepspace5)
- Muddy Squirrel Tape (December 2019)

Mixtapes

- Bible Bus (June 29, 2010)
- Christopher Collabo (January 29, 2013, with DJ Sean P)

Beat Tapes

- Who's Harry Krum (July 7, 2009)
- Dirty Harry (September 12, 2014)
