= Deepspace5 =

American hip-hop supergroup

- Origin: Florida, United States
- Genres: Christian hip hop, underground hip hop
- Years active: 1997—present
- Labels: DeepSpace5, Uprok, Gotee, ILLECT, Mega Royal
- Members: Playdough; Manchild; DJ Dust; Fred B (Freddie Bruno); Listener; Beat Rabbi; Manwell? Sivion; Sev Statik; Sintax.the.Terrific
- Past members: Illtrip; Recon
- Website: www.deepspace5.com

Deepspace5 is an underground hip hop supergroup formed in 1997 and currently composed of Beat Rabbi, Manwell?, Freddie Bruno, Listener, Mars ILL (a standalone duo consisting of Manchild and DJ Dust), Playdough, Sintax.the.Terrific, Sivion, and Sev Statik. Deepspace5 also previously included Illtripp and The Recon. Since its formation, the collective has sold over 100,000 copies of its recordings, and has performed with KRS-One, Atmosphere, and MF Doom, among others.

== Career ==
Deepspace5 first coalesced in 1997 at an annual Christian hip hop conference called Cru-vention. Listener, Sev Statik, Sintax.the.Terrific, Manchild and Recon all met with each other at the conference and recorded an EP. Shortly afterward, DJ Dust and Manchild were signed to the Tooth & Nail imprint Uprok Records as a duo project named Mars ILL, and they suggested that Uprok release a Deepspace5 project. Playdough and Freddie Bruno, who at the time recorded as a duo called Phonetic Composition, joined the group in 2000, after Playdough met with DJ Dust and Sintax in Atlanta. In the same year, the rapper Braille introduced Beat Rabbi to Manchild and DJ Dust, and Beat Rabbi was invited to join Deepspace5 a few months after Playdough and Freddie Bruno joined the project.

During the recording sessions for Deepspace5's first studio album, The Night We Called It a Day, rapper Sivion joined the collective. The album was released in 2002 to a warm critical reception. A second album, Unique, Just Like Everyone Else, followed in 2005.

At Scribble Jam 2008, Deepspace5 took second place in the Music Video competition for "From the Outside", from The Future Ain't What It Used to Be (released in 2010).

Deepspace5 released Bakesale on April 29, 2008, exclusively on its website and SphereOfHipHop.com for CD or digital download, as a fund-raiser for its most recent album, The Future Ain't What It Used to Be, which was released on Mega Royal Records on April 27, 2010.

The group released "5:55" on October 20, 2017, exclusively on their new official webpage at BandCamp.com The 5-song EP was their first album in over seven years.

== Releases ==
- The Beginning, Is the Start of Everything (DeepSpace5 Records, 1997)
- The Night We Called It a Day (UpRok Records, 2002)
- Unique, Just Like Everyone Else (Gotee Records, 2005)
- Deepspacesoul w/ Beat Rabbi (ILLECT Recordings, 2008)
- Bakesale (Deepspace5 Records, 2008)
- Greatest Beats and Unreleased (Deepspace5 Records, 2008)
- The Blueprint 3 Outtakes (Deepspace5 Version), a.k.a. 5Print mixtape (Independent release, 2009)
- The Future Ain't What It Used to Be (Mega Royal Records, 2010)
- 5:55 (BandCamp.com self-release, 2017)
