= List of Christian hip-hop artists =

This is a list of artists who perform within the Christian hip hop subgenre, a subgenre of both hip hop music and contemporary Christian music, containing Christian lyrics.

== Artists ==
=== 0–9 ===
- 116 Clique
- 4th Avenue Jones
- 6 Way St.

=== A ===
- The Ambassador
- Anike (formerly known as Wande)
- Applejaxx

=== B ===
- B-U
- Basehead
- B. Cooper
- B. Reith
- BB Jay
- Beautiful Eulogy
- Benjah
- Bizzle
- Braille (formerly known as Bryan Winchester)
- Brainwash Projects
- Brethren
- Timothy Brindle
- Brinson
- Bryson Gray
- Bumps Inf
- Bushwick Bill

=== C ===
- Canon
- Capital Kings
- Byron "Mr. Talkbox" Chambers
- Chance the Rapper
- Cheno Lyfe
- Chris Cobbins
- Aaron Cole
- The Cross Movement

=== D ===
- D-Boy
- D-Maub
- D-Naff
- Da' T.R.U.T.H.
- Datin
- Dax
- DC Talk
- Dee-1
- Deepspace5
- Deezer D
- Deraj
- Derek Minor (formerly known as Pro)
- D.O.C.
- DJ Dust
- DJ Maj
- DJ Official
- DMX
- Dre Murray
- Dwayne Tryumf
- Dynamic Twins

=== E ===
- Emcee N.I.C.E.
- End Time Warriors (also known as E.T.W.)
- Eshon Burgundy
- Everyday Process

=== F ===
- Alex Faith
- Faith Child
- Family Force 5
- Fern
- FLAME
- Foreknown
- Stan Fortuna
- Kirk Franklin
- Forrest Frank
- Fresh I.E.

=== G ===
- Gawvi
- Aha Gazelle
- Gemstones
- Jon Gibson
- Jamie Grace
- GRITS
- God's Property
- Gospel Gangstaz
- Gowe
- Christon Gray
- Taelor Gray
- Group 1 Crew
- Guvna B

=== H ===
- Half Mile Home
- MC Hammer
- Hazakim
- HeeSun Lee
- Jackie Hill Perry
- HillaryJane
- Hollyn
- Hostyle Gospel
- Hulvey

=== I ===
- Ill Harmonics

=== J ===
- J.R.
- Jai
- Japhia Life
- JGivens
- Je'kob
- MC Jin
- Joey the Jerk
- John Givez
- Sean C. Johnson
- Brent Jones
- Canton Jones
- Chad Jones
- Mahogany Jones
- Json
- JTM

=== K ===
- K-Drama
- K. Sparks
- KB
- KJ-52
- Krum (formerly Playdough)

=== L ===
- L.E.D?
- LA Symphony
- Lecrae
- Shai Linne
- Liquid
- Limoblaze
- Listener
- LPG
- LZ7

=== M ===
- Mali Music
- Manafest
- Manchild
- Mars Ill
- Marty
- Mase
- Heath McNease
- Cody Miles
- Andy Mineo (formerly known as C-Lite)
- Willie "Pdub" Moore Jr.
- George Moss
- Mr. Del
- Mr. J. Medeiros

=== N ===
- Antonio Neal
- New Breed
- NF
- No Malice (formerly known as Malice)

=== O ===
- Only Won

=== P ===
- Corey Paul
- Peabod
- Peace 586 (formerly known as MC Peace)
- Michael Peace
- Pettidee
- Phanatik
- Pigeon John
- P.O.D.
- Promise
- Propaganda
- Purified
- Pusha T

=== Q ===
- Quest

=== R ===
- R.M.G.
- R-Swift
- Rapture Ruckus
- Rawsrvnt
- Reconcile
- RedCloud
- Redimi2
- John Reuben
- Dax Reynosa
- Rev. Run
- Rhema Soul
- Ruudolf
- .rod laver

=== S ===
- Sev Statik
- Sevin
- Sintax the Terrific
- S.O.
- Sho Baraka
- Shonlock
- Sivion
- Skrip
- Sean Slaughter
- Dan Smith (formerly known as Listener)
- Social Club Misfits (formerly known as Social Club)
- Soul-Junk
- SoulJa
- Soup the Chemist (also known as Sup the Chemist & Super C)
- Stephen the Levite
- Street Symphony
- Swoope
- Symbolic One (also known as S1)

=== T ===
- T-Bone
- Tedashii
- thebandwithnoname
- Theory Hazit
- Thi'sl
- tobyMac
- Tony Tillman
- Trip Lee
- Tunnel Rats
- Tyshane

=== U ===
- Uncle Reece

=== V ===
- V. Rose
- Verbs (formerly known as Knowdaverbs)
- Vico C
- Viktory

=== W ===
- W.L.A.K. (acronym for We Live As Kings)
- The Washington Projects
- Whosoever South
- Stephen Wiley
- iROCC Williams
- Paul Wright

=== Y ===
- Ye (formerly known as Kanye West)
- Yo Majesty
- Young Chozen
- Young Joshua

=== Z ===
- Zane One
- Zauntee
- Asaiah Ziv

== See also ==
- List of Christian bands and artists by genre
