= Theophanies (album) =

Studio album by Hazakim
- Released: June 23, 2009
- Studios: Studio 101, Melbourne, Florida
- Genre: Christian hip hop
- Length: 72:25
- Label: Lamp Mode
- Producer: Hazakim

Hazakim chronology
Theophanies (2009)	Son of Man (2014)

Theophanies is the second album from hip hop duo Hazakim. The album was released on June 23, 2009, through Lamp Mode Recordings. Although Theophanies was Hazakim's second album, it was their first studio album to be released on a record label with national distribution. Theophanies helped to establish Hazakim's unique sound and approach to lyricism in the christian hip hop genre.

== Background ==
Following their independent 2001 release titled Hip-Hologetics, Hazakim signed with Lamp Mode Recordings in 2007. Theophanies was released by Lamp Mode Recordings two years later on June 23, 2009. It was produced entirely by Hazakim and contained guest appearances from fellow label-mates Shai Linne and Stephen the Levite as well as MuzeOne. Messianic Jewish scholar Dr. Michael Brown is also heavily featured throughout the album.

The album's cover art is based on the cover of Henry Mancini's album Six Hours Past Sunset.

== Music and lyrics ==
The musical backdrop of Theophanies features a unique blend of East Coast hip-hop with melodies and sounds synonymous with Middle Eastern music. While the lyrics are nearly entirely in the English language, sections of the album contain Hebrew. The lyrical content of Theophanies focuses heavily on the theological concept of theophanies in the Old Testament. The premise of the album is that Jesus of Nazareth, most often referred to in the album by his Hebrew name, Yeshua, is the ultimate revelation of God to man. This divine Messiah, they argue, appears throughout the Hebrew Bible as the divine Messenger of God's presence, and revealed Himself in time and space, most definitively, as Jesus of Nazareth. Throughout the album Hazakim cites, in rap form, passages from the Hebrew Bible where a divine visitor, who seems to carry the prerogatives and name of the God of Israel, manifests in a physical form. The album ends with a declaration that this messenger was, in fact, the pre-incarnate Son of God, Jesus. In this way, the album makes a case for the deity of Jesus using the Hebrew Bible. This concept of Jesus's pre-incarnate appearances in the Old Testament is known in Christian theology as a christophany.

== Reception ==
Theophanies was met with positive reviews. Rapzilla critic Claude Atcho wrote, "Overall, Theophanies is nothing short of remarkable." Due to the positive reception Theophanies received, Hazakim's subsequent album, Son of Man, was able to crack multiple Billboard charts, despite the five year gap between projects.

== Track listing ==
Theophanies track listing
No.	Title	Writer(s)	Length
1.	"Intro"	Tony Wray, Mahlodi Wray	1:56
2.	"Fulfillment (Ben Joseph, Ben David)"	Michael Wray, Tony Wray	3:33
3.	"Genesis 18"	Tony Wray	2:42
4.	"Brace Yourself"	Tony Wray, Michael Wray	3:23
5.	"Shamayim of Gold"	Michael Wray, Tony Wray	5:14
6.	"Salvation Plan" (featuring Stephen the Levite)	Michael Wray, Darrell Bell, Tony Wray	3:57
7.	"Theophanies Interlude" (featuring Dr. Michael Brown)		1:22
8.	"Genesis 32"	Michael Wray	3:23
9.	"Mercy" (featuring MuzeOne)	Tony Wray, Gabriel Padilla	4:13
10.	"Eighties Mix"	Mahlodi Wray, Michael Wray	2:09
11.	"Heavy Laden" (featuring Dwayne O'dell)	Michael Wray	5:14
12.	"Uncut & Raw"	Tony Wray	3:26
13.	"Exodus 3"	Tony Wray	2:08
14.	"Passover Lamb"	Michael Wray, Tony Wray	5:11
15.	"Crucifixion Description"	Michael Wray, Tony Wray	5:20
16.	"Risen" (featuring Shai Linne)	Michael Wray, Tony Wray, Shai Linne	3:57
17.	"Judges 13"	Michael Wray	2:12
18.	"Only Hope"	Michael Wray, Tony Wray	4:49
19.	"Kadosh (Conclusion)"	Tony Wray	4:06
20.	"Summary of the Evidence W/ Dr. Michael Brown" (featuring Dr. Michael Brown)		1:59
21.	"Outro"	Tony Wray, Mahlodi Wray	2:02
Total length:			72:25
