= Hee-sun =

- Hangul: 희선
- RR: Huiseon
- MR: Hŭisŏn

Hee-sun, also spelled Hui-seon, is a Korean given name.

People with this name include:

- Kim Heesun (born 1972), South Korean writer
- Kim Hee-sun (born 1977), South Korean actress
- HeeSun Lee (born 1983), South Korean-born American singer
- Jang Hee-sun (born 1986), South Korean field hockey player
- Joo Hee-sun, South Korean music video director

Fictional characters with this name include:

- Ahn Hee-sun, in 2013 South Korean television series All About My Romance
- Moon Hee-sun, in 2013 South Korean television series That Winter, the Wind Blows

== See also ==
- List of Korean given names
