= Shut It Down (EP) =

EP by Rawsrvnt
- Released: May 19, 2017
- Genres: Hip hop; Christian hip hop; alternative hip hop
- Length: 21:27
- Label: Soul Deep Records
- Producers: Chuck Hemann, Eddy Puyol

Rawsrvnt chronology
Soul Deep (2016)	Shut It Down (2017)

Shut It Down is the fourth extended play recording from Eddy "Rawsrvnt" Puyol. Soul Deep Records released the project on May 19, 2017. Puyol worked with Chuck Hemann, a frequent collaborator, in the production of the EP. The album artwork and design is by Edward Bayonet of iAMbayo.net.

One of the first singles, "There Go That Man," was featured on ESPN's First Take during live broadcasts from the home cities in the 2017 NBA Finals and continued to be heard on the show throughout June. The track features Houston rap veteran Lil Raskull and is the second song from the duo to receive such placement on this network/show. (The previous effort was "Game Changer" in January 2016.) Later that month the network extended the licensing agreement and used the song on their 2017 NBA Draft preview show as well as the next evening's live broadcast of the event. "There Go That Man" was utilized in as the single theme in an introductory video package, a clip showcasing the overall number one pick, and as background music throughout the five-hour telecast.

The title track, "Shut It Down," was licensed by CBS for a Miami Dolphins highlight package from the team's pregame show against the Minnesota Vikings and used as the theme song for the Miami Dolphins weekly TV show, Dolphins Weekly, throughout the 2017 National Football League (NFL) season.

The Calgary Stampeders are also big fans. So far the Canadian Football League's (CFL) team has used three Rawsrvnt songs to hype up in-game action and promotional videos - and each year their team went to the championship game to capture the Grey Cup. The first was "Go Hard" (2016) from the album Game Changer (Rawsrvnt album), "All In" featuring Teron Carter (of GRITS fame) and Pettidee (2017), and "Shut It Down" featuring PyRexx (2018) from Rawsrvnt's Shut It Down EP. 2018 was the year the team officially "Shut It Down" with a 27-16 win over the Ottawa Redblacks to win it all. It's the Stampeders eight Grey Cup, and the team's first victory since 2014.

The project features a guest artist on each of the five tracks and has Rawsrvnt leaning in to the sports anthem sound heard on several songs from his extensive catalog that has been used in athletic competitions and related national broadcasts.

Shut It Down EP guest appearances are: PyRexx, Japhia Life, Greg Cooks, Lil Raskull, Pettidee and Teron Carter.

== Music videos ==
Two music videos were released to support the Shut It Down EP.

The first was a gritty performance clip shot and edited by Blurry Vision Films for the title track. Rawsrvnt joined PyRexx in Dallas, Texas for the shoot that was later given a "Visual Remixx" treatment with additional eye-popping effects by iAMbayo.net.

"On the Line" also received a music video treatment. Japhia Life and Rawsrvnt met up in Miami, Florida to shoot the visual with Joel Davis (aka Geek formally of the group Surf Gvng). The video switches between darker scenes shot in front of the city's iconic, art deco Colony Hotel and a beautiful sunset at South Beach. Press materials for the release mentioned that the song's lyrics were "deeper than they first appear" given circumstances taking place in Rawsrvnt's life at the time the video was created.

== Critical reception ==
Professional ratings
Review scores
Source	Rating
New Release Today	2.5/5 stars
Cross Rhythms	7/10 squares

In his review for New Release Today, titled "Music for The Finals," Mark Ryan gave the album three out of five stars and noted that, "The production on this EP is well done."

Rating the album a seven out of ten for Cross Rhythms, Tony Cummings says, "For me though the best cut is the title track which the rapper himself calls his 'motivational music.' I love the way he expresses positivity and a fearless attitude."

In the Fellowship of Christian Athletes (FCA) Magazine recommendation of the album they said, "An album of songs that encourages listeners to give their best effort in any challenge, leaving no doubt who will be declared the victor."

== Track listing ==
No.	Title	Lyrics	Music	Producer(s)	Length
1.	"There Go That Man" (featuring Lil Raskull)	Eddy Puyol, Delbert Harris	Chuck Hemann	Puyol, Hemann	4:06
2.	"All In" (featuring Pettidee and Teron Carter)	Puyol, Dewayne Petty, Carter	Petty, Hemann	Puyol, Hemann	3:48
3.	"Ice" (featuring Greg Cooks)	Puyol, Greg Cooks	Hemann	Puyol, Hemann	4:25
4.	"Shut It Down" (featuring PyRexx)	Puyol, Joseph McSweeney	Alex Hitchens	Puyol, Hemann	4:41
5.	"On the Line" (featuring Japhia Life)	Puyol, James Golding	Hitchens	Puyol, Hemann	4:28
Total length:					21:27
