= James Golding =

James Golding may refer to:

- James Golding (cricketer)
- James Golding (racing driver)
- James Golding (footballer)
- Japhia Life (James E. Golding), American singer and hip hop musician
