= Game Changer (Rawsrvnt album) =

Studio album by Rawsrvnt
- Released: October 9, 2015
- Genre: Hip hop, Christian hip hop, Reggae, Christian R&B, R&B, CEDM
- Length: 40:08
- Label: Soul Deep Records
- Producer: Chuck Hemann, Eddy Puyol

Rawsrvnt chronology
#LoveStruck (2014)	Game Changer (2015)	Soul Deep (2016)

Game Changer is the fifth studio album from Eddy "Rawsrvnt" Puyol. Soul Deep Records released the album on October 9, 2015. Puyol worked with Chuck Hemann, in the production of this album. The album artwork and design is by Edward Bayonet of iAMbayo.net.

The title track, "Game Changer" featuring Lil Raskull, was featured on ESPN's First Take, licensed by CBS for a Miami Dolphins highlight package from the team's pregame show against the Tampa Bay Buccaneers, and included on Miami Dolphins Coach Joe Philbin's TV show where they used the track and T-shirt for a regular segment honoring the Dolphins "Game Changer" player of the week for 17 straight episodes.

The follow-up single, "Go Hard," received additional professional sports licensing and was played on CBS during the National Football League's (NFL) Miami Dolphins 2015 preseason opener versus the Chicago Bears. The Canadian Football League's (CFL) Calgary Stampeders also used the track in games and promotional videos during the 2016 season.

The album has more than just sports anthems though. Elsewhere, Rawsrvnt showcases his ability to write a love song from a believer's perspective and a newlywed. In an interview for WadeORadio.com, Rawsrvnt told Sketch the Journalist, "There aren't a lot of songs that both set the mood and express intimacy in ways that honor God. So instead of just complaining about it, I decided to pick up the pen and contribute my own art in that direction." The end result was a cover of Robin Thicke's "Lost Without U" and an original track titled "Light Up the Night."

The album closes with a song, "Father I Trust Ya," inspired by Rawsrvnt's life's motto that carries an inspirational message for everyone dealing with life's problems.

== Music videos ==
Two music videos were released to support the Game Changer album.

The first was for the title track. It was shot and edited by Factor Effects in Houston, Texas with rapper Lil Raskull who is featured on the song. The clip's storyline follows the duo recording and performing the song. And in a nod to the sports-anthem feel of the track, both artists are seen in headgear that shows support for athletic teams in their respective areas.

The second visual is a filmed performance of Rawsrvnt's "All of the Lights" spoken word piece. In it, the artist shares his perspective of what it feels like to be lost, hurting, broken, and hoping for a better day.

== Critical reception ==
Professional ratings
Review scores
Source	Rating
CCM Magazine	3/5 stars
New Release Today	2.5/5 stars
Cross Rhythms	7/10 squares

Awarding the album three stars at CCM Magazine, Kevin Sparkman states, "Blending the best in dance club appeal, Eddy 'Rawsrvnt' Puyol offers Game Changer. His music is just as raw as both his stage name implicates and his personal life reflects—sold out for Christ, and blatantly unashamed to say it on record."

Mark Ryan, giving the album two and a half stars from New Release Today, writes, "It is a definite party album that you can put in the family wagon and ride to. The beats are strong, and the lyrics are uplifting." He closed by saying, "It is hard to give what could have been a good album such a bad score, however, I could not gloss over Rawsrvnt's choice to cover a Robin Thicke song."

Rating the album a seven out of ten for Cross Rhythms, Tony Cummings says, "My favourite cuts are the title track, featuring Lil Raskull, and "Go Hard" with Transparent, and there are a couple of others which wouldn't be out of place on the CR (Cross Rhythms) playlist."

The Fellowship of Christian Athletes (FCA) Magazine recommended the album by saying it is, "An album perfect for locker rooms with an edgy, urban pop sound with a definitive Miami vibe."

== Track listing ==
No.	Title	Lyrics	Music	Producer(s)	Length
1.	"Fallin' In Love" (featuring Milliyon)	Eddy Puyol, Keenen Browne	Chris Joyce	Puyol, Chuck Hemann	3:55
2.	"Game Changer" (featuring Lil Raskull)	Puyol, Delbert Harris	Reginald Boudreaux	Puyol, Hemann	4:00
3.	"Go Hard" (featuring Transparent)	Puyol, Dwight Taylor, Sr.	Brandon Peavy	Puyol, Hemann	4:38
4.	"Show Me" (featuring HeeSun Lee)	Puyol, Cynthia Chi	Chris Belmont, Edgar Lagares	Puyol, Hemann	4:01
5.	"My Music"	Puyol	Matthew Wade	Puyol, Hemann	3:44
6.	"Won't Stop" (featuring St. Matthew)	Puyol, Matthew Golding	Ronnie Cash	Puyol, Hemann	4:07
7.	"Light Up the Night" (featuring Erica Cumbo)	Puyol, Erica Hooper	Joyce	Puyol, Hemann	3:34
8.	"Lost Without U"	Robin Thicke, Sean Hurley, Puyol	Puyol, Hemann	Puyol, Hemann	4:01
9.	"All of the Lights" (Spoken Word)	Puyol	Filipe Michael	Puyol, Hemann	2:54
10.	"Father I Trust Ya" (featuring Sara Delight*)	Puyol, Sara Delight	Alex Hitchens	Puyol, Hemann	5:14
Total length:					40:08
