= Brinson =

Brinson may refer to:

- Brinson (rapper) (born 1989), American rapper
- Brinson (surname), includes a list of people with the surname
- Brinson, Georgia, U.S. town
