= Kim Hui-seon =

Kim Hui-seon or Kim Hui-son (김희선) may refer to:

- Kim Hee-sun (athlete) (born 1963), South Korean female athlete
- Kim Heesun (born 1972), South Korean female novelist and pharmacist
- Kim Hee-sun (born 1977), South Korean actress
