= Out the Box (Tonéx album) =

Out The Box

Live album by Tonéx & The Peculiar People
- Released: May 18, 2004
- Recorded: September 19, 2003
- Genre: R&B; Gospel; Rock; Hip hop
- Length: 151:48
- Label: Verity Records/Nureau Ink
- Producer: T.Bizzy

Tonéx & The Peculiar People chronology
Oak Park 92105 (2003)	Out The Box (2004)	Ain't Remyx (2005)

Out The Box is the first live album and third major release by American Gospel music singer Tonéx. It was recorded Live on September 19, 2003, at The San Diego Civic Theater. The single "Work On Me" reached #3 on Billboard's Hot Gospel Songs chart. "Out the Box" is Certified Platinum selling well over 980,000 copies.

== Background ==
On September 19, 2003, at 2:30 P.M., over 400 people were already lined up outside the San Diego Civic Theatre for the Out the Box live recording. The recording did not start until 8:00 P.M. that evening. The anticipation was high for Tonéx's first live recording. An over capacity crowd of over 3,500 people stood shrieking with applause, eagerly awaiting Tonéx to emerge from a 9-foot tall music box. From that point...it was on! Tonéx and a multicultural 40-voice choir called The Peculiar People, a seven piece band, three piece horn section, and four dancers mesmerized the audience for over three hours. They did their best to capture what happened that night. The screams you hear are real, not added. The anointing they experienced that night was real, not contrived.

== Track listing ==
Disc 1

1. Yolanda Adams Introduction
2. Overture
3. Out the Box
4. The Trust Theory
5. Alive (Not Dead)
6. Alive 2
7. Fundamentals
8. Work On Me
9. Games
10. Endangered Species
11. The Children's Bread
12. Freestyle — Church Floor
13. Real With U (Live)
14. Taxi Overture
15. Taxi (Live)
16. Personal Jesus (Live)
17. Why? (Live)
18. God Has Not 4Got (Live) (Piano by Kirk Franklin)
19. To Know You Lord (Live)
20. God Is Love
21. Ain't

Disc 2

1. Nureau Ink
2. Believer
3. Todos Juntos (featuring Sheila E.)
4. Your Word (featuring Morpheus)
5. Freestyle - Throneroom
6. The Spirit Realm
7. Freestyle — Worship
8. Make Me Over
9. The Truth
10. Since Jesus Came (featuring Kirk Franklin)
11. Out The Box (Outro)
12. Syng
13. Doesn't Really Matter (featuring Applejaxx)
14. Thank Q
15. Closing Interview

== Personnel ==
Instrumentalists

- Organ and Additional Keys: Marcus "Panda Bear" Hodges
- Keys and Colors: Shaun Martin
- Piano and Fender Rhodes: Dwayne Swan
- Key Bass: Jae Deal
- Guitars: Tim Stewart
- Bass: Chris "Worldwide" Pottinger
- Drums: Robert "Sput" Searight
- CrazyHornz: Randolph Ellis III (Sax), Ray Montiro (Trumpet), Gary Smith (Trombone)
- Featured Percussion: Sheila E. on Todos Juntos
- Featured Piano: Kirk Franklin on God Has Not 4got

The Peculiar People

- Sopranos: Yvette Williams, Vernice Burroughs, Myrna Elguezabal, Bianca Alverez, Bonita Bankhead, Zerina Shepherd, Eva Carmarillo, Libna Cazares, Deborah Gonzalez, Ester Ortega, Tamara Rae, Miriam Suarez, Carmen Verduzco, Brenda Zavala, Bridgette Newman
- Tenors: Damion "D-Willy" Willis, Jason Brown, Enoch Ruiz Jr., Josue Anguiano, Victor Duarte Jr., Cedric Baltrip, Mike "B." Burroughs, Felipe Gutierrez III, Jacob Herrera, Josh Herrera, Richard Ramirez, Ronnie Rey, Dannie "Doe-nay" Rivera, Alfonso Rivera, Arturo San Vicente
- Altos: Amber Carter, Giovanni Oats, Fretrice Ewell Knox, Crystal Duarte, Yesinia Calderon, Tiffany Cross, Leah Hendrix, Francesca Hiuzar, Alina Perez, Merari Torresday, Melina Rivera, Joanna Saldago, Abigail "Abby" Sotelo, Sonya Vasquez, Karina Torreseday

Dancers

- Paul Michael Reed
- K.J. Gonzales
- Samath Orm
- Erik Sarapudon
