= Diamante Music Group =

American independent record label distributor

- Founded: 1993
- Founder: Bill Conine
- Defunct: 2004
- Status: Defunct
- Genre: Christian music
- Country of origin: United States
- Location: Newport Beach, California

Diamante Music Group was a Newport Beach, California–based independent record label distributor active from 1993 through 2004. Diamante was home to several dozen small independent record labels, some of whose artists later gained worldwide recognition.

Among such were Rescue Records whose releases for San Diego–based artists P.O.D.'s Snuff the Punk and Brown and Tonéx's Pronounced Toe-Nay, who later signed contracts with Atlantic Records and Jive Records respectively, elevating the desire for the Rescue Records releases. Another notable Diamante-distributed label is Tooth & Nail Records whose artists Thousand Foot Krutch and MxPx first rose to prominence as independents. Multiple Dove Award winner Crystal Lewis made Diamante Music Group home for her independent label Metro One Music. Diamante was also home to N'Soul Records, the boutique label of Christian dance music pioneer Scott Blackwell and the Nitro Praise series.

In 2001, it was merged with The Butterfly Group, a record label collective of the Christian music industry started by Mike Rinaldi and Bob Carlisle, to become Diamante-Butterfly Group, LLC. The company consolidated its operations to Nashville, Tennessee, in 2003. Though numerous attempts had been made to resuscitate the independent distribution channel in the Christian music market, Diamante-Butterfly filed for chapter 11 bankruptcy in 2004 and was sold to CNI Distribution.

In 2006 Syntax Records purchased the remaining assets of what was known as the Butterfly Group which included three P.O.D., titles, six Winan's titles, and many more before parting some of it out to other companies including their new distribution partner Koch Entertainment.

== Partial list of distributed labels ==
- 5 Minute Walk Records
- Against the Flow Records
- AIR Gospel
- Alarma Records
- Bettie Rocket Records
- Blonde Vinyl
- Cross Movement Records
- Eternal Funk Records
- Faith MD Music
- Galaxy 21 Music
- Grapetree Records
- Grrr Records
- Holy Roller Entertainment
- Insync Music
- JDI Records
- KMG Records
- Lion of Zion Entertainment
- MCM Music
- Metal Blade Records
- Metro One Music
- Micah Records
- MYX Records
- N'Soul Records
- Only God Entertainment
- Rescue Records
- Resolve Records
- Rhythm House Records
- Rocket Dog Records
- Rowe Productions
- Rustproof Records
- Screaming Giant Records
- Seventh Street Records
- Shabach Entertainment
- Syntax Records
- The Acappella Company
- Tooth & Nail Records

== See also ==
- List of record labels
