= Shut It Down =

Shut It Down may refer to:

- Shut It Down (album), a 2003 album by American death metal band Animosity
- Shut It Down (EP), a 2017 EP by American Christian hip hop artist Rawsrvnt
- "Shut It Down" (song), a 2009 song by American rapper Pitbull
- "Shut It Down", a 2010 song by Drake from Thank Me Later
- "Shut It Down (Neil Young and Crazy Horse song)", a 2019 song
- "Shut It Down" (Chicago Fire), a 2020 television episode

== See also ==
- Shut 'Em Down (disambiguation)
