= Flip the Switch (disambiguation) =

"Flip the Switch" is a 2018 song by Quavo from his 2018 album Quavo Huncho.

Flip the Switch may also refer to:

- Flip the Switch, 2005 remix album by the Chemical Brothers
- Flip the Switch, 2013 EP by L.E.D?
- "Flip the Switch", 1997 song by the Rolling Stones from the album Bridges to Babylon

== See also ==
- Switch
- "Nonstop" (song), by Drake, 2018, which features the lyrics "Look, I just flipped the switch (flipped, flipped)".
