= O2 (Tonéx album) =

O_{2}

Studio album by Tonéx
- Released: April 9, 2002
- Recorded: 2001–2002
- Studio: Q, San Diego, California; Soundcastle Studios, West Hollywood, California; Golden Track Studios, West Hollywood, California; Syntax Recording Studios, West Hollywood, California
- Genre: R&B, Gospel
- Length: 70:29
- Label: Zomba
- Producer: T-Boy/Timothy "rocdomz" Trudeau

Tonéx chronology
Circu$$ (2000)	O_{2} (2002)	Oak Park 92105 (2003)

O_{2} is the second studio album and major release by American gospel music singer Tonéx. It was released under Zomba Records in 2002 and spawned two major hits, "God Has Not 4Got" and "Bout a Thang", which had a video for the single. The album reached number seven on the Billboard Top Gospel Albums chart, number twenty on the Top Contemporary Christian chart, number twenty on the Top Heatseekers chart, and number 66 on the R&B Albums Chart.

== Track listing ==
1. "Prologue"
2. "O_{2}"
3. "'Bout a Thang"
4. "Pass Me By"
5. "Dancin' in the Son"
6. "That's When"
7. "Everything"
8. "I Have Decided..."
9. "Decided 'The Sequel'"
10. "God Has Not 4Got"
11. "Help!"
12. "Seasons"
13. "Inspiration"
14. "You"
15. "Tumblin'"
16. "Even U"
17. "See You Again"
18. "The Beautiful Place"
19. "Epilogue"

== Credits ==
- Tonéx - vocals, drum programming
- Glenn McKinney Sr - guitar
- T-Boy - Multi instruments, producer
- Charles Williams - piano
- Timothy "rocdomz" Trudeau - Composer, engineer, producer, programming
- Sam Boukas - engineer, mixing
- Robbie Lewis - arranger

== Reception ==
AllMusic's Tim Smith gave the album a four-star review, saying that O2 "showcases Tonex's ability as a vocalist" and pushed "all musical boundaries". Village Voice selected O2 as best representing Tonéx's full potential.
