= B.Slade =

American musician and dancer

- Also known as: B.Slade, T.Boy, The Architect, Tonéx, TON3X, T.Bizzy, The Black Maverick, O'ryn, Pastor N8ion, LeMar Jackson
- Born: Anthony Charles Williams II; May 16, 1975 (age 51)
- Origin: San Diego, California
- Genres: R&B; soul; Gospel; neo soul; jazz; hip hop; funk; pop; trance; dubstep
- Occupations: Singer; songwriter; record producer; arranger; choreographer; dancer
- Instruments: Vocals; piano; organ; keyboards; drums
- Years active: 1992–present
- Labels: Rajah; MSS; Rescue/Diamante; Tommy Boy Gospel; Jive/Verity; Battery Records/Song/BMG; Nureau Ink; Suxxess; Universal; Syntax

Anthony Charles Williams II (born May 16, 1975), better known by his stage name B.Slade and formerly as Tonéx (/ˈtoʊneɪ/ TOH-nay), is an American musician, dancer, producer, and activist from San Diego, California.

Williams has released several hundred songs on dozens of albums throughout his career, has also produced several others for both gospel and secular artists. He has won six Stellar Awards, a GMA Award, and received two Grammy nominations: one for Best Contemporary Soul Gospel Album for his 2004 gold album, Out the Box, and another in 2009 for Best Urban/Soul Alternative Performance for his single, "Blend", from his 2009 mainstream (albeit theoretically Gospel) album, Unspoken.

Known primarily for his gospel recordings, his musical efforts blend a wide range of styles, including pop, R&B, jazz, soul, funk, hip hop, rock, Latin, electro, punk and trance. His primary influences include Stevie Wonder, Billy Joel, Prince, Michael Jackson, Walter Hawkins, David Bowie, and Janet Jackson. His distinct sound and eclectic style of music led him to describe his own music as a genre he called "Nureau".

== Music career ==
=== Early life ===
Born in 1975, Williams grew up in the San Diego, California area. His father, Anthony Williams, was the Senior Pastor of the Truth Apostolic Community Church in suburban Spring Valley and served as a district elder in the California District Council of the Pentecostal Assemblies of the World (PAW). His mother, E. B. Williams, was a licensed minister in the PAW and served the church as an Assistant Pastor. Anthony was the youngest of the Williamses’ six boys. Gospel music was the preferred choice at home, but other sounds made their way into Williams’ environment. His father played saxophone for James Brown and Jackie Wilson, his mother sang in various girl groups, and his older brothers sneaked in funk and R&B recordings at home. Deciding early on a musical career, he took the name "Tonex" by the time he was 13, sometimes spelling it "Tonéx"; at the age of 16, he and his parents hired his first personal manager, Benjamin Jimerson (also known as Benjamin Jimerson-Phillips), in 1991. Jimerson, who has since become a film producer, stated: "From the first moment I saw Tonex and he sang his first note, I realized I was dealing with a young man destined to become a major celebrity."

=== 1996–2000: Early career ===
Rescue was still a small label, and Pronounced Toe-Nay was issued in a limited production run and distributed mostly from the back of Williams' car. Young gospel fans, however, quickly caught on to the innovative variety of music on Pronounced Toe-Nay. The album's producer, T. Boy, was an alter ego of Tonéx himself. The album was divided by style into seven sections: hip-hop/rap, retro/funk, the future, jazz, mellow grooves, soul/gospel, and bonus tracks. In the recordings of Kirk Franklin and others, hip-hop had previously made inroads into gospel music, but this kind of wild eclectic mix was completely new. At the time, the digital reproduction of music was in its infancy, and rare copies of the album became prized possessions. The album garnered the attention of the producers at the 14th Annual Stellar Awards, and Tonéx was added to the lineup. His performance made a strong impression and has been noted by critics for its impact, drawing comparisons to Michael Jackson's performance at the Motown 25th Anniversary Special in 1983.

=== 2000–2004: Rising gospel artist ===
By this time, national labels had come calling. Tonéx was signed to an unusual three-way deal that affiliated him with the successful and growing gospel label Verity, the pop imprint Zomba, and the durable hip-hop label Tommy Boy. Tonéx made his national debut with a re-release of his most successful independent album, Pronounced Toe-Nay, in 2000. His first high-profile television appearance was performing a medley of "Trinity" and "One Good Reason" on the Stellar Awards, which was a coup as Tonéx was relatively unknown at the time. He dubbed his particular genre-spanning musical style "Nureau".

Upon its release, Pronounced Toe-Nay bore 5 different record label logos: Rescue Records, the independent label that originally released the album; Mo' Soule Steppyn Records, Tonéx's then-active vanity imprint label; Tommy Boy Gospel, the label to which Tonéx was signed as an artist; Verity Records, the label to which his independent label Rescue Records sold his album's masters; and Jive Records, the mainstream umbrella over Verity Records. All of the material was produced, arranged, composed and performed by Tonéx, with guest appearances from his mother E.B. Williams, and the rapper Big J.

Some executives wanted to develop Tonéx's career in a secular direction, but he turned them down and kept to religious themes. "There are a lot of people who do similar things to what I do in R&B, but I wanted to use gospel lyrics," he explained in an interview quoted on the Sphinx Management website.

After going through numerous revisions, his second album, O2, was released in 2002. According to Tonéx, the title of his second album referred to the year of release, the Element Oxygen, and the album's status as his second major recording. O2 matched the stylistic eclecticism of Pronounced Toe-Nay, with each track diverging completely from the one before. The album spawned a major Christian radio hit in "God Has Not 4Got", a Stellar Award-winning song that displayed Tonéx's ability to create traditional choral gospel music as well as innovative pop fusions. USA TODAY gave it 3 stars (out of 4). The music video for the single "Bout A Thang" received heavy rotation on BET and MTV Australia and featured energetic hip-hop dance and an urban image not usually associated with Gospel artists. O2 also featured a love song, "You", directed toward the artist's then-wife Yvette Williams (née Graham), a vocalist who at times went by the name Ms. Tonéx.

Becoming known to the wider contemporary Christian music community as a result of several music industry awards and award nominations, Tonéx went on tour with contemporary gospel artists Trin-i-Tee 5:7 and Men of Standard after the release of O2. Tonéx was moved up from opening act to headliner as audiences reacted enthusiastically to his music and his high falsetto voice. He performed once more at the Stellar Awards early in 2004 and won several awards.

Even though O2 brought him more mainstream success, Tonéx said that this album was not what he had in mind for release. He continued to release independent projects via the internet that showcased even more of his versatile creativity. The most acclaimed of these works was Oak Park 92105, released on his now-defunct Nureau Underground website in 2003; Tonéx stated it was this album that he intended to release after Pronounced Toe-Nay, and not O2. A double album, Oak Park 92105 mainly dealt with Tonéx's life growing up in the Oak Park community nestled in the eastern tip of southeast San Diego, California. It was eventually re-released on iTunes in 2005 with some new songs; however, the album was not without controversy, as Tonéx opted to include a "parental advisory: explicit lyrics" notice on the front cove, reportedly the first Christian-based album to carry the notice. Tonéx said the "explicit lyrics" notice was not a result of "cussing", but rather content that "might be a little too deep for children."

=== 2004–2006: Out The Box and accolades ===
His 2004 live double album Out The Box earned him the most widespread acclaim so far. Divided into segments ranging from traditional gospel and praise anthems to urban dance, rock, and hip-hop, the ambitious Out The Box was a sprawling double-disc set with 36 tracks, which included innovative intros, interludes, and some studio tracks. The supporting cast included a 10-piece band, 4 dancers, a 16-voice ensemble, and a 40-voice choir. Notable guest appearances on the album included Kirk Franklin, who plays piano in the live version of "God Has Not 4Got" and appears as an artist on "Since Jesus Came", and frequent Prince percussionist Sheila E, who appears on the Latin-flavored "Todos Juntos".

Out The Box debuted at No. 1 on the Billboard Top Gospel Album Chart in September 2004, appeared on the Billboard 200 and Top R&B/Hip-Hop Albums charts, and reached No. 5 on the Contemporary Christian chart. To date, it has sold over 500,000 copies. He also received a Grammy nomination for Best Contemporary Soul Gospel Album the following year and had another bona fide Christian radio hit with the ballad "Make Me Over". In 2005, Tonéx won a total of six Stellar Awards including "Artist of the Year" for Out The Box.

=== 2006–2010: Controversy, turbulence, and retirement from gospel ===
In July 2004, his father died, forcing him to take on the responsibility of becoming the senior pastor of their family's church in his stead. He also divorced his wife of five years, Yvette. In 2006, Verity Records sued Williams for one million dollars, citing breach of contract. Subsequently, Tonéx announced that he would retire from the gospel music industry, frustrated by politics and mistreatment. Following the announcement, Kirk Franklin posted a personal blog on his own website sympathizing with the artist's feeling "the weight of an industry that is only built to make money, not heal broken souls". He continued releasing music independently, using MySpace as his primary vehicle for promotion.

In March 2007, a reconciliation with Zomba was announced, which would be a joint venture for his Nureau Ink label. The deal was struck under the auspices of new Zomba president James "Jazzy" Jordan (who previously had guided the careers of R. Kelly and Salt-N-Pepa). With a new record deal under his belt, he was preparing to release a double-disc set titled Stereotype: Steel & Velvet, which was slated to be released on September 11, 2007. It was purportedly described as an album that would do for his career what Thriller did for Michael Jackson, and what Purple Rain did for Prince. However, in June 2007, another split with Zomba was announced, fueled by a leak of the vitriolic and profanity-laden song "The Naked Truth", along with several similarly themed blogs and videos. Tonéx cited label frustration as one of the reasons he leaked the song, and he soon faced much scrutiny within the gospel arena for the explicit language and the angry tone of the song and its subsequent blogs. He later closed down his social media accounts for several months before resurfacing on the web in January 2008.

Recreating a softer gospel-friendly image, Williams changed his stage name to Ton3x (or TON3X) in 2008. He left the Verity Records family and signed with Battery Records, a label imprint of Sony/BMG. His only Battery Records release was the album Unspoken, released on March 17, 2009. The first single from that album, entitled "Blend", was nominated for a Grammy Award for Best Urban/Alternative Performance, despite very little promotional/financial support from Sony/Battery, and garnered the artist his first non-gospel Grammy nomination. That year, he also presented awards at the Grammy pre-telecast, including the first two awards given to Lady Gaga, who was already backstage preparing for her show-opening performance.

In September 2009, The Word Network aired an appearance of Tonéx on The Lexi Show. Starting as another promotional tool for his music, the interview unexpectedly changed directions, leading to Williams candidly expressing his views on sexuality and revealing his own same-sex attraction. Though his sexual orientation had already been highly speculated on within the African-American and gospel communities, the unapologetic tone of these revelations was condemned by conservative Christians, and bookings and appearances were universally cancelled, eventually leading to Williams being excommunicated from his church. The artist would later say that he was "caught off guard" by the show's line of questioning but that he answered every question truthfully.

On December 29, 2009, Tonéx's website, as well as his Twitter and Facebook accounts, reported that the artist's mother, Evangelist and vocalist E.B. Williams, had died the day before. Williams would soon end his pastoral duties at his family's church.

On June 9, 2010, Tonéx announced a mixtape, the digital-only release The Parking Lot. The mixtape was also distributed in NYC that night after a performance. On June 15, 2010, the name Tonéx/TON3X was officially retired. A "Tonéx Vault" was created on Bandcamp to share rare and previously unreleased material like the shelved Verity project, Gosp0p.

=== 2010–2013: Rebirth as B.Slade and return to independence ===
Recreating himself as an out indie R&B/glam pop artist, Williams dubbed himself B.Slade and using digital media to release his new music and ideas. The name change was inspired by the character Brian Slade from the art film Velvet Goldmine.

Though he faced resistance from his former conservative gospel fans, his newfound transparency and honest lyrics helped him carve a niche in the LGBT music scene, which itself was slowly gaining acceptance in the mainstream field. Albums announced and partially produced under the Tonéx brand like A Brilliant Catastrophe, his Michael and Janet Jackson tribute mixtape, and the long-awaited Stereotype were all officially released during this time. B.Slade performed "You Make Me Feel (Mighty Real)" as a tribute to disco singer Sylvester at the 7th Annual OUTMUSIC Awards in 2011. His full-length album Diesel was released through his label Suxxess Records on July 19, 2011.

After completing his stint in the musical The Who's Tommy in the summer of 2011, B.Slade began work on his next concept album, Knowing. An ambitious "pop opera" narrating a dystopian take on the future of the major record label monopoly, the album would serve as a soundtrack that the artist planned to turn into a feature film musical. Knowing was scheduled for a release on Christmas Day 2011 (another album, Stealth, was released on this day instead), but after a few delays, it was released discretely in memory of Whitney Houston on February 11, 2012.

In the fall of 2012, B.Slade embarked on his "Sex, Drugs and Sushi US Tour", performing shows in Chicago, New York, and taking up residency at the WitZend in Venice, Los Angeles during September and November. He was nominated for four awards at the 8th Annual OUTMUSIC Awards, winning one for Best R&B/Soul Song. He released another album, Stunt B%$@H, on January 25, 2013.

=== 2014–present ===
2014 saw a resurgence from the artist as a viable mainstream producer and songwriter, placing songs on albums from Sheila E. (Icon) and Faith Evans (Incomparable). He also wrote and co-produced Angie Fisher's single "I.R.S.". The song became a hit upon its debut on Stevie Wonder's Los Angeles radio station KJLH, before going nationwide and peaking at No. 29 on Billboard's Adult R&B chart. "I.R.S." was nominated for Best Traditional R&B Performance at the 57th Annual Grammy Awards, her first Grammy nod. He also worked with Fisher on her debut album from Hidden Beach Records.

In 2015, B.Slade co-wrote several songs on Elijah Blake's debut album, Shadows & Diamonds, including "I Just Wanna..." (which peaked at No. 23 on Billboard's Hot R&B Songs chart) and its title track. He also wrote and arranged the song "Unhappy" from Jordin Sparks' third album, Right Here Right Now, and produced comeback singles from Tisha Campbell-Martin and Chaka Khan. B.Slade also contributed as a singer, writer, and producer on Snoop Dogg's gospel compilation album, Bible of Love (2016).

== Acting and musical theatre ==
Along with the many changes made by B.Slade in 2008, a foray into acting became part of his long list of endeavors. He made his film debut in the 2008 Charlie Murphy comedy The Hustle, which was released to home video in 2011. In September 2008, he played the role of James "Thunder" Early in a San Diego production of the Broadway musical Dreamgirls. Later in 2008 and early 2009, B.Slade played the character of Rolin in The Princess and The Black-Eyed Pea at the Lyceum Theater in San Diego. In 2011, he played the starring role in San Diego Repertory Theatre's production of The Who's Tommy. His performance earned him the Craig Noel Award for Outstanding Lead Performance in a Musical.

== TV and movie soundtracks ==
B.Slade sang and produced the opening song for the UPN television series One on One. His production was featured on the song "Off We Go" from the film Gigli starring Jennifer Lopez and Ben Affleck and in the BET Films movie The Walk starring Eva Marcille. "Cry No More" from the album Pronounced Toe-Nay was featured in the HBO film Prison Song starring Q-Tip and Mary J. Blige, while the track "The Good Song 2005", a remake of the original "The Good Song", was included on the soundtrack of the action movie xXx: State of the Union starring Ice Cube.

B.Slade's song "Don't Wake Me" was featured on the second episode of the 2013 BET series Second Generation Wayans. In 2013, he produced the score for the 44th Annual NAACP Image Awards telecast. In 2014, B.Slade produced and co-wrote the theme song to OWN (The Oprah Winfrey Network) series, Flex & Shanice, starring Flex Alexander and Shanice Wilson, and guest-starred in some episodes. The first season of the series garnered two singles written and produced by B.Slade, "Gotta Blame Me" and "We Can Fly". He also performed the theme song for the Bounce TV's sitcom One Love.

In 2021, B.Slade guest-starred on Pose in the episode titled "Take Me to Church."

== Media appearances ==
In 2005, B.Slade co-hosted the 20th Annual Stellar Awards with Donnie McClurkin and Yolanda Adams. As "DJ Tonéx", he hosted his own syndicated contemporary gospel radio show in partnership with SupeRadio Networks and Blue-Sky Productions entitled Club Virtue, from 2005 to 2007. He also briefly hosted the BET J (now BET Her) show Lifted, which blended positive secular and gospel music programming. In 2010, The New Yorker published a lengthy article on the artist, highlighting his journey as one of the first major gospel artists to come out.

== Public image ==
B.Slade's appearance has varied, ranging from a suit with close-cropped hair to flamboyant attire, including feather boas, fur coats, punk-inspired multi-colored hairstyles, headpieces reminiscent of Sanjaya Malakar, dreadlocks in the style of Stevie Wonder, and platform shoes that recalled 1970s and 1980s glam rock. As Tonéx, his image raised eyebrows in the conservative gospel and contemporary Christian music communities, and he eventually moderated his look for a short time. But he made no apologies. "It wasn't me trying to make a statement; I've always been different," he told George Varga of the San Diego Union-Tribune. "And it worked. Outside of church, people are always asking me what my tattoos mean."

== Solo discography ==
=== as Tonéx ===
Major label releases

- 2000: Pronounced Toe-Nay
- 2002: O2
- 2003: Oak Park 92105
- 2004: Out The Box
- 2009: Unspoken
- 2012: Playlist: The Very Best of Tonéx (compilation)

Independent and underground releases

- 1994: Silent X: The Self Confrontation
- 1995: Damage
- 1997: Pronounced Toe-Nay (underground release)
- 1999: Personal Jesus (Remixes)
- 2000: Circu$$
- 2001: Tonéx Presents MSS Dynasty: The Hostile Takeover
- 2003: The O'ryn Project: Figure 'O Speech
- 2003: Protranslutionary
- 2003: Oak Park 92105 (underground release)
- 2003: Remyx: Pronounced Ree-Mix
- 2005: Ain't Remyx
- 2005: Oak Park 92105 (iTunes release)
- 2006: Oak Park 921'o6 Syntax Records
- 2006: Banganyn EP
- 2006: The London Letters
- 2007: Oak Park 921'o6 Japanese Import
- 2007: Stereotype: Steel & Velvet (MySpace release, listen-only)
- 2008: T.Bizzy: The Album
- 2008: Banganyn Remyxes
- 2008: Tonéx Presents T.R.O.N. (The Ryderz of Nureaumerica)
- 2008: The Naked Truth
- 2008: Bapost.o.g.i.c.
- 2008: Rainbow EP
- 2009: TEMET NOSCE Nag Champion Mixtape
- 2009: Circu$$ (Digital Release, Final Configuration)
- 2009: OakPark 921'06 (Digital Release)
- 2009: Baposto.g.i.c. Mixtape (Digital Tracked Version)
- 2009: Personal Jesus: Remixes (Digital EP)
- 2010: The Parking Lot (Digital Release)
- 2011: Gosp0p (Digital Release)

Singles

- 1993: "Ain't Nobody Better: The Remyxes"
- 1997: "Restoration "
- 1997: "Personal Jesus"
- 1998: "Mark of the Beast"
- 1999: "One Sunday Morning"/"For the Life of Me"
- 1999: "Mad"
- 2000: "Personal Jesus"
- 2002: "Bout a Thang"
- 2002: "God Has Not 4got"
- 2002: "That's When"
- 2004: "Doesn't Really Matter"
- 2004: "Make Me Over"
- 2004: "Since Jesus Came"/"Todos Juntos"

=== as B.Slade ===
- 2010: A Brilliant Catastrophe (Alpha)
- 2010: A Brilliant Catastrophe (Beta)
- 2011: Stereotype: Collector's Edition
- 2011: Diesel
- 2011: Stealth
- 2012: Knowing
- 2012: Deep Purple
- 2013: Stunt B%$@H
- 2013: My September Issue [Limited Edition]
- 2014: Anything For Wifey (Music From And Inspired by the Original Motion Picture)
- 2014: My September Reissue
- 2015: Shade, Smoke & Treez
- 2015: DeLorean
- 2016: Ferrari
- 2017: B.Slade
- 2019: BLEU.
- 2019: Taurus
- 2021: MANICON:mmmm88xx

Compilations and Mixtapes

- 2010: Dawn O' the Unicorn (mixtape)
- 2010: Dance Floor Arsonist: The Jack5on Magic Mixtape
- 2011: Songs O' Lament
- 2012: The Children
- 2012: Cigar (compilation)
- 2012: Deep & Slow (mixtape)
- 2012: B.Slade Live at the WitZend
- 2017: The Black Belt
- 2020: Out the Box 2: The Separation of Church and State
- 2020: Out the Box 3: The United States of Genesis
- 2021: Pronounced Be-Slayed (mixtape)

== Awards and nominations ==
=== Music ===
==== BET Awards ====
Year	Nominee / work	Award	Result
2003	Tonéx	Best Gospel Artist	Nominated

==== GMA Dove Awards ====
Year	Nominee / work	Award	Result
2001	Virtuosity by Virtue	Urban Album of the Year (producer)	Nominated
2003	The Fault Is History by Souljahz	Urban Album of the Year (producer)	Won
2004	"Let Go" by Souljahz	Urban Recorded Song of the Year (songwriter)	Nominated
2005	Out the Box	Urban Album of the Year	Nominated

==== Grammy Awards ====
Year	Nominee / work	Award	Result
2005	Out the Box	Best Contemporary Soul Gospel Album	Nominated
2010	"Blend"	Best Urban/Alternative Performance	Nominated

==== OUTMUSIC Awards ====
Year	Nominee / work	Award	Result
2012	"Elegant Simple"	Best Rock Song	Nominated
2012	"Phony Pony" feat. Jaila Simms, Trevon James, & DDM	Best Hip-Hop/Rap Song	Nominated
2012	"I'm Done" feat. Yummy Bingham	Best R&B/Soul Song	Won
2012	"Get Over You" feat. Frankie Knuckles	Best Dance/Electronica	Nominated

==== Stellar Awards ====
Year	Nominee / work	Award	Result
1999	Pronounced Toe-Nay	Rap/Hip Hop Gospel CD of the Year	Nominated
2003	"God Has Not 4 Got"	Song of the Year	Nominated
2003	O2	Male Vocalist of the Year	Nominated
2003	O2	Contemporary CD of the Year	Nominated
2003	O2	Rap/Hip Hop Gospel CD of the Year	Won
2003	O2	Recorded Music Package of the Year	Nominated
2003	"'Bout A Thang"	Music Video of the Year	Nominated
2003	Virtuosity! by Virtue	Urban/Inspirational Performance of the Year (producer)	Nominated
2005	Out the Box	Artist of the Year	Won
2005	Out the Box	Contemporary Male Vocalist of the Year	Won
2005	Out the Box	Contemporary CD of the Year	Won
2005	Out the Box	Urban/Inspirational Performance of the Year	Won
2005	"Make Me Over"	Song of the Year	Won
2005	"Thank Q"	Rap/Hip Hop Gospel CD of the Year	Won

=== Theatre ===
==== Craig Noel Awards ====
Year	Nominee / work	Award	Result
2011	The Who's Tommy	Lead Performance in a Musical, Male	Won

== See also ==
- List of smooth jazz performers
