= Shai Linne =

American East Coast Christian rapper (born 1974)

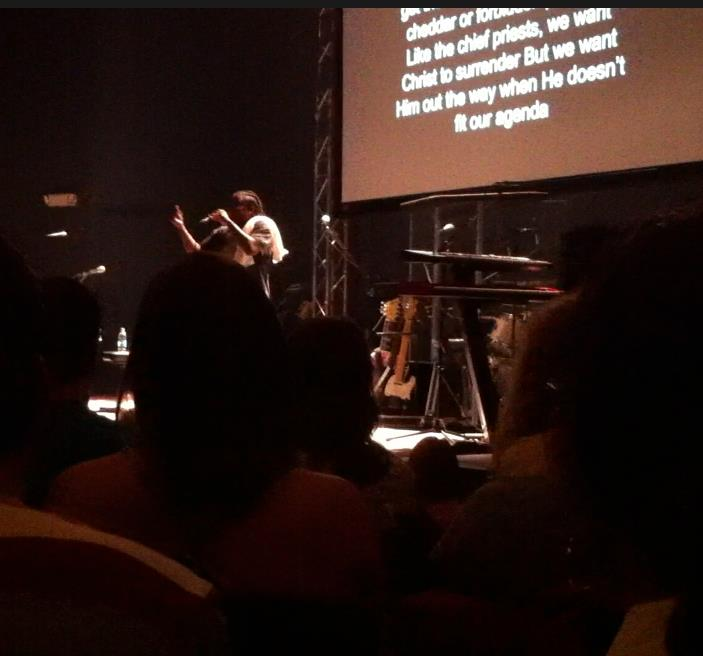
- Shai Linne performing at The Summit Church in Durham, North Carolina in August 2011

Background information
- Born: August 21, 1974 (age 51)
- Origin: Philadelphia, Pennsylvania
- Genres: Christian hip hop
- Years active: 2002–present
- Label: Lamp Mode
- Website: www.lampmode.com/artists/shai-linne/

Shai Linne (born August 21, 1974) is an American East Coast Christian rapper, author, and assistant pastor. Linne has been collaborating with other Christian rap artists and releasing studio albums since 2002. Linne has recorded studio albums under the Lamp Mode Records label.

== Early life ==
Linne was an atheist for most of his childhood and dates his conversion to 1999. Linne is Calvinist in his soteriology (doctrine of salvation), and his 2008 album The Atonement included a song "Mission Accomplished", which defended limited atonement.

== Career ==
Linne has collaborated with Lecrae, Trip Lee, Timothy Brindle, Flame, Hazakim, and numerous other Christian rappers. He appeared on the 116 Clique album 13 Letters. In 2011, Linne was featured on "The Lord is a Warrior", the tenth track from Matt Papa's This Changes Everything.

In 2013, Linne released a single called "Fal$e Teacher$", in which he criticized prosperity theology, and named false teachers, including Joel Osteen, Kenneth Copeland, Creflo Dollar, T. D. Jakes, Benny Hinn, Paula White, and Joyce Meyer.

In addition to being recognized as a pioneer in "lyrical theology", Linne has been touted for the complexity of his rhyme schemes when rapping. According to a study performed by a Finnish doctoral candidate, Eric Malmi, Linne placed as the fourth as measured by rhyme density. The study took the lyrics of 94 artists and plugged 10,082 songs into an algorithm that Malmi created to detect assonance rhymes. Linne was preceded in the rankings only by Inspectah Deck of Wu-Tang Clan, Rakim and Redrama.

=== Ministry ===
In 2016 Linne, along with Brian Davis, planted Risen Christ Fellowship in Philadelphia. Linne served as an assistant pastor and elder at Del Ray Baptist Church in Alexandria, Virginia, having previously been a member of Capitol Hill Baptist Church in Washington, D.C., and Epiphany Fellowship in Philadelphia.

Following his two-year tenure at Del Ray Baptist Church, Shai Linne took a step back from touring full-time. In May of 2024, he launched a podcast with Lamp Mode, cohosted with The Ambassador and Ben Otero, called The Halftime Podcast. Later in the year he also served as a guest preacher and speaker at various conferences.

== Personal life ==
Linne is married to Blair Wingo, and together they have three children.

== Discography ==
=== Studio albums ===
List of studio albums, with selected chart positions
Title	Album details	Peak chart positions				
Title	Album details	US	US Chr	US Gos	US Ind	US Rap
The Solus Christus Project	Released: March 10, 2005; Label: Lamp Mode; CD, digital download	—	—	—	—	—
The Atonement	Released: February 12, 2008; Label: Lamp Mode; CD, digital download	—	—	—	—	—
Storiez	Released: November 18, 2008; Label: Lamp Mode; CD, digital download	—	—	31	—	—
The Attributes of God	Released: November 21, 2011; Label: Lamp Mode; CD, digital download	—	14	5	32	15
Lyrical Theology, Pt. 1: Theology	Released: April 9, 2013; Label: Lamp Mode; CD, digital download	136	7	4	26	12
Lyrical Theology, Pt. 2: Doxology	Released: May 20, 2014; Label: Lamp Mode; CD, digital download	–	13	6	37	17
Still Jesus	Released: July 21, 2017; Label: Lamp Mode; CD, digital download	—	16	—	25	—
Jesus Kids	Released: September 21, 2018; Label: SDGFella Music; digital download	—	—	—	—	—
Lyrical Theology, Pt. 3: Sociology	Release: TBA; Label: LampMode; Digital Download	—	—	—	—	—
