= Tree of Life Version =

Messianic Jewish Bible translation

- Abbreviation: TLV
- Complete Bible published: 2011
- Textual basis: OT: Masoretic Text . NT: Nestle-Aland's Novum Testamentum Graece (27th edition).
- Translation type: Word-for-word
- Reading level: 8th Grade (Age 13)
- Copyright: Messianic Jewish Bible Society
- Religious affiliation: Messianic Judaism
- Website: tlvbiblesociety.org
- Genesis 1:1–3 1 In the beginning God created the heavens and the earth. 2 Now the earth was chaos and waste, darkness was on the surface of the deep, and the Ruach Elohim was hovering upon the surface of the water. 3 Then God said, "Let there be light!" and there was light. John 3:16 16 "For God so loved the world that He gave His one and only Son, that whoever believes in Him shall not perish but have eternal life.

The Tree of Life Version of the Holy Scriptures (TLV), first published in 2014, is a Messianic Jewish translation of the Hebrew Bible (or Tanakh) and the New Testament (or New Covenant) sponsored by the Messianic Jewish Family Bible Society and The King's University.

== Purpose ==
According to the publisher, Baker Books, the Tree of Life Version (TLV) is intended to be a translation that "speaks with a decidedly Jewish-friendly voice [...] to recover the authentic context of the Bible and the Christian faith." The sponsors of the translation sought to restore to the biblical texts "their actual Jewish essence," which, in their view, is lost in most English translations.

Specifically, the project sought to restore "the Jewish order of the books of the Old Testament," "the Jewish name of the Messiah, Yeshua," "reverence for the four-letter unspoken name of God," and "Hebrew transliterated terms, such as shalom, shofar, and shabbat." Prior to the publication of the TLV in its entirety, It was previously published either with the TLV New Covenant alone or bound together with the public domain 1917 Jewish Publication Society Version Tanakh as the Messianic Jewish Shared Heritage Bible.

The TLV has been cited as an example of a distinctly Messianic Jewish approach to translation. Rabbi Jason Sobel pointed out that as part of its emphasis on Jewish heritage, TLV “follows the chapter and verse enumeratioh as found in the Hebrew Bible". Don Finto has cited it as having a better translation for a passage than traditional translations.

== Translators ==
The team of Messianic Judaism and Christian scholars commissioned to work on the project included Dr. Jeffrey L. Seif, Rabbi Dr. Jeffrey Feinberg, Rabbi Dr. Glenn Blank, Dr. Hellene Dallaire, Rabbi Jeff Adler, Rabbi Barney Kasdan, and Dr. Vered Hillel. Other contributors included Mark Anthony, Michael L. Brown, Dr. Jack Cairns, Dr. Mordechai Cohen, Pat Feinberg, Dr. John Fischer, Dr. Patrice Fischer, Dr. Steve Galiley, Dr. Ray Gannon, Dr. Henri Goulet, Dr. Ihab Griess, Dr. David Harris, Dr. Stanley Horton, Dr. Daniel Juster, Liz Kasdan, Elliot Klayman, Dr. Seth Klayman, Dr. Craig Keener, Phillip Lanning, Dr. Barrie Mallin, Rabbi Dr. Shawn Moir, Dr. Richard Nicol, Dr. Seth Postell, Dr. David Rothstein, Dr. Noel Rabinowitz, Dr. Rich Robinson, Dr. Matthew Salathe, Dr. Jim Sibley, Josh Sofaer, Dr. Greg Stone, Rabbi Eric Tokajer, John Taylor, Myles Weiss, Dr. Randy Weiss, Dr. Lon Wiksel, and Dr. Wayne Wilks.
