= Sk8 (TV series) =

American-Canadian television series (200i–2002)

- Created by: Thomas W. Lynch; Christopher Mack
- Written by: Ann Knapp Austen; Anthony Cipriano; Thomas W. Lynch; Christopher Mack; Douglas Sloan
- Directed by: Anthony Atkins; Bill Gereghty; James Head; Robert Lee; Mick MacKay; Patrick Williams
- Starring: Christopher Jorgens; Jorgito Vargas, Jr. Blair Wingo; Adrienne Carter
- Countries of origin: United States; Canada
- Original language: English
- No. of seasons: 1
- No. of episodes: 13

Production
- Executive producers: Bob Hargrove; Douglas Sloan; Ann Knapp Austen
- Running time: 22 minutes
- Production companies: GEP Productions; Tom Lynch Company

Original release
- Network: NBC
- Release: October 6, 2001 – January 5, 2002

Sk8 (also known as Skate) is a teen drama series that aired on NBC's TNBC Saturday morning programming block from October 6, 2001 to January 5, 2002 with 13 episodes produced. The show continued in reruns until TNBC's dissolution and replacement by programming leased from Discovery Kids by NBC starting in September 2002.

The series was co-created by Thomas W. Lynch, who also co-created Just Deal, TNBC's first single-camera format series, with Sk8 becoming the second and final series on the lineup to be shot in the same format.

== Premise ==
The show featured storylines concerning the life of an aspiring pro skater and his relationships with a motley crew of friends. The show featured guest appearances by professional skateboarders and guerrilla film and video shooting styles.

== Cast ==
=== Main cast ===
- Christopher Jorgens as Josh Raden
- Jorgito Vargas, Jr. as Dim
- Blair Wingo as Vanessa
- Adrienne Carter as Michelle

=== Recurring cast ===
- Claudette Mink as Whitney Lass
- Noel Fisher as Alex
- Darcy Laurie as Gideon
- Pua Kekaula as Dom
- Bryce Hodgson Les
- Anthony Harrison as Peter Raden

== Episodes ==
No.	Title	Directed by	Written by	Original release date
1	"Decks, Lies & Videotape"	Anthony Atkins	Christopher Mack	October 6, 2001
2	"Bucks for Trucks"	Unknown	Ann Knapp Austen	October 13, 2001
3	"Lost and Found"	Unknown	Unknown	October 27, 2001
4	"All Skate"	Unknown	Unknown	November 3, 2001
5	"Running on Full"	Unknown	Unknown	November 17, 2001
6	"The Map"	Unknown	Unknown	November 24, 2001
7	"Love and Skate"	Unknown	Unknown	December 1, 2001
8	"Workin' It"	Unknown	Unknown	December 8, 2001
9	"Choosing Your Battles"	Unknown	Chris Long	December 15, 2001
10	"The Tao of Josh"	Unknown	Unknown	December 22, 2001
11	"Frontin' Poser"	Unknown	Unknown	December 29, 2001
12	"Making the Transition"	Unknown	Ann Knapp Austen	January 5, 2002
13	"Steppin' Up"	Unknown	Unknown	January 5, 2002
