= Shut 'Em Down =

Shut 'Em Down may refer to:

- Shut 'Em Down (album), an album by rap group Onyx
  - "Shut 'em Down" (Onyx song), the title song
- "Shut 'Em Down" (Public Enemy song), 1991
- "Shut 'Em Down" (LL Cool J song), 2000
- "Shut 'Em Down 2002", a song by Busta Rhymes from the 2001 album Genesis (Busta Rhymes album)

== See also ==
- Shut It Down (disambiguation)
