= The Fault Is History =

The Fault is History

Studio album by Souljahz
- Released: February 24, 2002
- Genre: R&B, rap
- Label: World Entertainment, LLC.
- Producer: Hubert Robertson

Souljahz chronology
2002 (2001)	The Fault is History (2002)	S.O.S. Single (2005)

The Fault is History is an album by Christian R&B Group Souljahz.

It was co-produced by Chris Rodriguez, Tonéx, DJ Niques and Julian Tydelski.

The album won 'Urban Album of the Year' at the 2003 Dove Awards, while "All Around the World" won the award for 'Best Rap/Hip-Hop/Dance Recorded Song'.

== Track listing ==
1. "Let Go"
2. "All Around the World"
3. "Same 'Ol Game"
4. "Vejea Speaks on Racism"
5. "The Color Hate"
6. "Reflection"
7. "Beneath the Surface"
8. "True Love Waits"
9. "Vejea Speaks on Poverty"
10. "Poor Man"
11. "Souljahz Don't Stop"
12. "Worship"
13. "The Anthem"
14. "Keep Risin'"
15. "Keep Risin'" (Instrumental Version)

== Album credits ==
Hubert Robertson: Executive Producer
Dan Needham: Drums
Kiko Cibrian: Guitar
Beth Herzhaft: Photography
Gavin Lurssen: Mastering
F. Reid Shippen: Mixing
Craig Young: Bass, Guitar, Digital Editing, Drum Programming, Engineer
Barry Landis: Executive Producer
Carl Hergesell: Keyboards
Tonéx: Keyboards, Vocals, Drum Programming, Producer
Philip LaRue: Vocals
Souljahz: Main Performer
Javier Solís: Percussion
John Catchings: Cello
David Davidson: Violin, Viola
