= Blair Wingo =

American actress

- Born: November 27, 1984 (age 41); Grand Rapids, Michigan, U.S.
- Other names: Blair Linne
- Occupations: Model, actress, poet
- Spouse: Shai Linne

Blair M. Wingo Linne (born November 27, 1984) is an American model, actress, and Christian spoken word artist.

== Career ==
She appeared on several television shows including Alias, Days of Our Lives, Malcolm in the Middle, Boston Public, The Parkers, American Dreams, and her own Saturday morning show, SK8. Wingo's poetry has been featured on Nightline and in the Los Angeles Times.

== Personal life ==
She is married to Christian rapper Shai Linne.

== Filmography ==
=== Film ===
Year	Title	Role	Notes
2008	Beautiful Losers	Dennice (teenage)	

=== Television ===
Year	Title	Role	Notes
2000	Malcolm in the Middle	Amaani	Episode: “Lois’ Birthday”
2001	The Parkers	Samantha McGee	Episode: "Who's Your Mama?"
2001	Sk8	Vanessa	Episode: "Decks, Lies & Videotape"
2002, 2003	Boston Public	Nancy	3 episodes
2003	Miracles	Young Woman	Episode: "The Ferguson Syndrome"
2003	American Dreams	Anita	2 episodes
2003	The Division	Yvonne Lewis	Episode: "Thus with a Kiss I Die"
2004	10-8: Officers on Duty	Lucy Delprette	Episode: "Wild and the Innocent"
2005	Alias	Lani	Episode: "The Road Home"
