= Oak Park 921'o6 =

Studio album by Tonéx
- Released: 2006
- Recorded: 2005
- Genre: R&B, Gospel
- Length: 117:44
- Label: Nureau Ink/Syntax
- Producer: T. Bizzy, Chizmatonic

Tonéx chronology
Oak Park 92105 (2006)	Oak Park 921'o6 (2006)	The London Letters (2006)

Oak Park 921'o6 is an independent studio album and twelfth release overall by American gospel music singer Tonéx. It was made for Family Christian Stores exclusively. The Japanese version was released in 2007 through Syntax Records. It contains new tracks not included on the 2006 version.

== Track listings ==
=== 2006 version ===
1. California 2006
2. Checkmate
3. Anthony
4. Chollas Parkway
5. U Need The Master
6. Tippy
7. Alright
8. Can't U See?
9. You
10. My Friend (featuring Chizmatonic)
11. Like
12. Stones (featuring Jeff Mayors)
13. Fail U
14. God'z Got It
15. Priceless
16. Now
17. Out The Game (featuring Gibraan)
18. When My Words
19. Feelings (featuring Karen Carpenter)
20. Stay
21. Sometimes
22. Yahtzee
23. Yes (featuring Montell Jordan)
24. Deliver

=== 2007 Japanese release ===
1. Now
2. Alright
3. You
4. Holy-NESS
5. Can't U See?
6. Priceless
7. Fail U
8. Out The Game (featuring Gibraan)
9. Feelings (featuring Karen Carpenter)
10. Yes (featuring Montell Jordan)
11. Like
12. Anthony
13. My Friend (featuring Chizmatonic)
14. Tippy (featuring Rhonda Patton)
15. God'z Got It
16. HUP! (featuring Omega)
