= Applejaxx =

American Christian hip hop artist

- Also known as: Apple
- Born: Ernest Lee Owens; October 3, 1982 (age 43)
- Origin: Fayetteville, North Carolina, USA
- Genres: Christian hip hop, hip-hop
- Occupations: Rapper, Producer, Staff Assistant
- Years active: 2003–present
- Labels: Nureau Ink, Fadacy
- Website: www.fadacy.com

Ernest Lee Owens (born October 3, 1982) better known as Applejaxx, is a Christian hip hop artist from North Carolina.

== Career ==
His early influences ranged from Run DMC, N.W.A, and Nas. He grew up playing basketball and had always enjoyed hip hop. In 1997, Applejaxx started to write rhymes and freestyle. Soon after high school, Applejaxx went on to attend Campbell University in North Carolina, where he soon met Tonéx at a concert in 2003.

The name Applejaxx refers to bearing good fruit as Apple, "jaxx" comes in as "jacking" someone out of the world into the light, out to bear good fruit.

His first appearance was on gospel/pop artist Tonéx's album Out The Box. The single off his first project, "Nureau Anthem", which features T.Bizzy, was featured on HipHopDX.com. He has also collaborated with many in the Christian hip hop community, making guest appearances with artists such as DJ Morph, Gibraan, and The Washington Projects. Owens was interviewed by the prolific rapper Eminem's station Shade 45.

Applejaxx is also a staff assistant at Harvard Law in Technology & Research.

== Album title issue ==
Applejaxx was set to release his debut album "Born Identity" out with Universal, but due to the Bourne Identity movies by the company and Universal being concerned about consumer confusion, they told him to change the title. He then decided on "Back 2 The Future" instead.

== Discography ==
=== Albums ===
- Back 2 The Future (2009)
- Organic (2012)

=== EPs ===
- 805 P.O.P. (2005)
- Jesus High (2010)
- Jesus High (Deluxe) (2011)
- Appletizer (2012)

=== Music Videos ===
- 2009 - Green As Luigi
- 2010 - Future
