= Son of Man (album) =

Studio album by Hazakim
- Released: September 23, 2014
- Studios: Writehand Productions, Melbourne, FL
- Genres: Christian hip hop, hip hop, urban gospel
- Length: 49:22
- Label: Lamp Mode
- Producer: Hazakim

Son Of Man was the third album from Hazakim, and the second album they released on Lamp Mode Recordings. The album became available for commercial purchase on September 23, 2014, Rosh Hashanah of that year. Son Of Man was the group's first album to make it onto the Billboard chart; peaking at numbers 10 and 40 in both Christian and Gospel music categories respectively.

== Theme ==
Following the release of Theophanies, five years earlier, Hazakim released Son Of Man on Lamp Mode Recordings in 2014. They chose September 23, the Jewish holiday of Rosh Hashanah, as the release date due to the album's heavy emphasis on Biblical eschatology and the second coming of Jesus. According to Hazakim's belief system (expressed on their blog), Rosh Hashanah, also called "the Feast of Trumpets", will find its fulfillment in the second advent of the Christ. One reason for this belief is that most of the New Testament passages that describe the second coming include reference to a trumpet. In Jewish tradition, the blowing of the shofar (a trumpet made from a ram's horn), is also associated with the story of the binding of Isaac, as well as a call to assembly, repentance and introspection. All of these themes are heard on Son of Man.

The title of the album has its roots in the seventh chapter of the Book of Daniel, where the Jewish prophet sees, in a vision, a divine man whom he calls a "son of man". This seemingly human man is depicted as "coming on the clouds of heaven" and enjoys divine prerogatives (such as receiving worship from all people) after he establishes an eternal kingdom. Later in the Gospels Jesus would adopt the title "son of man" in reference to Himself; a clear allusion to Daniel's apocalyptic vision of a divine man. In premillennial eschatology (the system held to by Mike and Tony of Hazakim) the fulfillment of Daniel 7 will be at the second coming of Christ when he rules for a thousand years, based on their interpretation of the Book of Revelation.

== Track listing ==
No.	Title	Writer(s)	Length
1.	"Kingdom Come" (featuring J. Williams)	Tony Wray, Michael Wray, Junior Williams	3:57
2.	"The Other Side"	Michael Wray, Tony Wray	4:25
3.	"At the Door"	Michael Wray, Tony Wray	5:01
4.	"Full Circle" (featuring Jai (rapper))	Tony Wray, Michael Wray, Jaime Williams	4:07
5.	"Only Beloved Interlude" (featuring Sam Shamoun)		2:58
6.	"Iron Clad" (featuring Monty G, God's Servant)	Michael Wray, Ramont Green, Tony Wray, Brian Davis	3:52
7.	"Time Zone"	Michael Wray	4:34
8.	"Strong Tower" (featuring S.O. (rapper))	Tony Wray, Oluwaseun Otukpe	4:14
9.	"Supernova" (featuring J. Williams)	Michael Wray, Junior Williams	5:06
10.	"Grace and Supplication"	Tony Wray	4:59
11.	"Lo Mefached Interlude (Not Afraid)"		1:12
12.	"Crown" (featuring Will Passion)	Tony Wray, Will Vega, Michael Wray	4:57
Total length:			49:22

== Chart performance ==
Chart (2014)	Peak position
US Top Christian Albums (Billboard)	40
US Top Gospel Albums (Billboard)	10
