= Bumps Inf =

American rapper

- Also known as: Bumps INF, Bumps
- Born: Mark Joseph James; February 10, 1985 (age 41); Cleveland, Ohio
- Genres: Christian hip hop, urban contemporary gospel
- Occupations: Singer, songwriter
- Instrument: Vocals
- Years active: 2007–present
- Label: God Over Money
- Website: Bumps Inf on Facebook

Mark Joseph James, (born February 10, 1985), who goes by the stage name Bumps Inf, is an American Christian hip hop musician from Cleveland, Ohio. He has released two studio albums, Pain in Paragraphs, in 2012, and Man vs. Machine, in 2015, both through God Over Money Records.

== Early life ==
Bumps Inf was born on February 10, 1985, as Mark Joseph James, in Cleveland, Ohio. His mother is Tina Marie James.

== Music career ==
His first studio album, Pain in Paragraphs, was released on August 28, 2012, with God Over Money Records. A second studio album, Man vs. Machine, was released on February 11, 2015, again with God Over Money Records. This was his debut album on the Billboard charts, and landed a placement on the Christian Albums chart at No. 43. New Release Tuesday rated the album four and a half stars out of five.

== Personal life ==
Bumps Inf married his second wife, Rachel James (née, Lane) on August 25, 2012, and they are presently residing in Cleveland, Ohio. He was previously married to another woman for eight years. Bumps Inf has fourteen children.

== Discography ==
=== Studio albums ===
List of studio albums, with selected chart positions
Title	Album details	Peak chart positions
Title	Album details	US Chr
Pain in Paragraphs	Released: August 28, 2012; Label: God Over Money; CD, digital download	–
Man vs. Machine	Released: February 11, 2015; Label: God Over Money; CD, digital download	43
The Chaos is Beautiful	Released: April 30, 2021; Label: God Over Money; CD, digital download	–
