= B-U =

American hip hop group

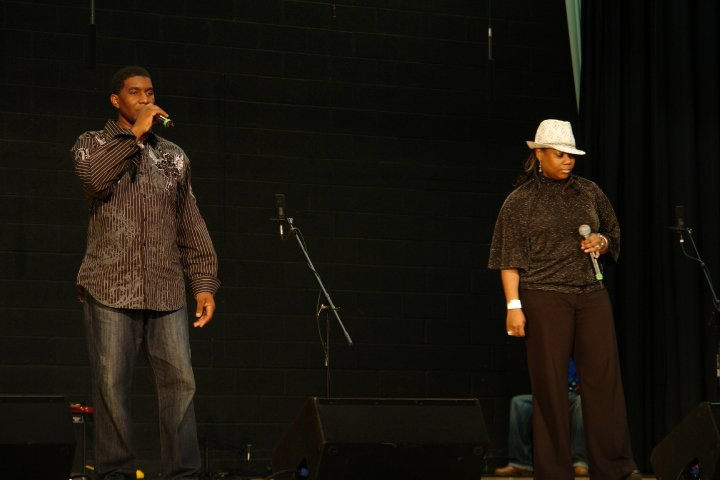

Background information
- Also known as: The Aquila & Priscilla of Christian Rap
- Origin: Steven: Columbus, Mississippi; Ursela: Raleigh, North Carolina
- Genre: Christian rap
- Years active: 2005-2011
- Label: Formerly B-U Entertainment LLC
- Members: Steven Bernard Mitchell
- Past members: Ursela Camille

B-U was an American Christian rap group, group members were Steven Mitchell and Ursela Camille. They were founders of the former Christian record label B-U Entertainment based in Raleigh, North Carolina.

== Biography ==
Steven Bernard, born in Columbus, Mississippi and Ursela Camille, born in Raleigh, North Carolina, met in a Raleigh recording studio in 2001. During this time they were already in pursuance of their own careers in the music industry; Ursela as the hip-hop recording artist “FIN” and Steven Bernard as the R&B recording artist “Bishop the RBP”. Ursela Camille (then FIN) would share stages with artists Wyclef Jean, Ginuwine, DMX, Lil' Kim, Lost Boyz & Escape, as well as a host of others. Steven Bernard (then Bishop the RBP) sang in local clubs and social events and worked on sharpening his production skills under the teaching of music producer, Jimmy Brown of EJ Productions. They worked together on several music recording projects, as well as stage productions such as A Streetcar Named Desire and Strong Woman.

In 2003, Bernard began to live a life of Christianity and, in 2004, Camille began a similar lifestyle. During this time the transformation from mainstream hip hop and R&B to Christian rap music began. In 2005 they formed B-U, meaning “being-used by Jesus Christ”.

== Discography ==
- Blessed Entertainment Presents 12th Round Knockout Round 1 Mixtape (2010)
- Tell Me The Truth (debut album 2011)

== Awards and nominations ==
- 2008 North Carolina Gospel Announcer's Prestige Award Guild Holy Hip Hop Artist of Year
- 2009 Rhythm of Gospel Awards nominee

Rhythm of Gospel Awards Group of the Year
Rhythm of Gospel Awards Song of the Year "Come On" produced by Steven B Mitchell for Gangus Khan Productionz written by Steven B. Mitchell(ASCAP) & Ursela C. Mitchell(BMI), label, B-U Entertainment(ASCAP)

- 2010 Independent/ Inspirational Gospel Music Award (IGMA) nominee

Artist of the Year
Song of the Year "Come On" produced by Steven B Mitchell(ASCAP) for Gangus Khan Productionz written by Steven B. Mitchell(ASCAP) & Ursela C. Mitchell(BMI), record label, B-U Entertainment(ASCAP)

- 2010 Rhythm of Gospel Awards Winner

Rhythm of Gospel Awards Holy Hip Hop Group of the Year
Rhythm of Gospel Awards Holy Hip Hop Song of the Year "Righteous Know Why produced by Steven B. Mitchell(ASCAP) for Gangus Khan Productionz, record label, B-U Entertainment(ASCAP)
