= Half Mile Home =

American gospel trio

- Origin: Akron, Ohio
- Genres: [R&B Inspiration] Christian R&B, Christian hip hop, urban contemporary gospel, contemporary R&B
- Years active: 2004–present
- Label: Traxx Off Da Heezy/Empire - God Made Millionairze/Bungalow/UMG - Church Boy Muzik/E1
- Members: Dave Felder; Todd Burton; Darryl Brownlee
- Past members: Dwanye Satterfield; Erik Allen; Quinton Mcraney
- Website: halfmilehome.online

Half Mile Home is an American gospel music trio from Akron, Ohio, where they blend Christian R&B and Christian hip hop together to make their version of urban contemporary gospel. They started making music in 2004, with their first studio album, The Movement. Their second studio album, Change My Lyfe, was released in 2010, while the third studio album, Church Muzik & Inspiration, was released in 2013. "Church Muzik & Inspiration" stayed on the Gospel Billboard sales charts for 34 weeks & peeked @ the # 10 spot... The fourth Cd "Don't Judge Me" to be released spring 2016 has a top 10 single "More Than Enuff" which has been on the Billboard magazine charts 28 weeks.

== Background ==
Half Mile Home are two brothers from Akron, Ohio, where they were established in 2004, being vocalist and guitarist, Terrence Burton lead vocalist and drummer, Todd Burton vocalist, pianist and producer, Darryl Brownlee lead vocalist and guitarist.

== Music history ==
The trio started as a Gospel musical entity in 2003, with their first studio album, The Movement in 2004, that was released on September 21, 2004, by Malaco/Marxan Records. Their subsequent studio album, Change My Lyfe, was released on April 13, 2010, from Bungalo Records/God Made Millionairze Inc. They released, Church Muzik & Inspiration, on January 22, 2013, with Church Boy Muzik/ Selecto Hits. This album was their breakthrough release upon the Billboard magazine charts, where it peaked at No. 9 on the Top Gospel Albums chart.

== Members ==
- Terence Burton – Lead Vocals, Song Writer & Drummer
- Todd Burton – Vocals, Piano/Keyboards/Organ, Producer
- Darryl Brownlee – Lead Vocals, Guitarist

== Discography ==
List of Albums, with selected chart positions
Don't Judge Me	Church Boy Muzik/Black Smoke World Wide/E1	Peak chart positions
Don't Judge Me	Church Boy Muzik/Black Smoke World Wide/E1	US Gospel
The Movement	Released: September 21, 2004; Label: Malaco Records; CD, digital download	—
Change My Lyfe	Released: April 13, 2010; Label: Bungalo/Universal; CD, digital download	—
Church Muzik & Inspiration	Released: January 22, 2013; Label: Church Boy Muzik/Selecto Hits; CD, digital download	11
