= Skrip (rapper) =

American rapper

- Also known as: Skrip, SKRIP
- Born: Adriel Cruz; February 19, 1987 (age 39); Chicago, Illinois
- Origin: Chicago, Illinois
- Genres: Christian hip hop, urban contemporary gospel
- Occupations: Singer, songwriter, producer, rapper
- Instruments: vocals, singer-songwriter
- Years active: 1999–present
- Label: Infiltrate
- Website: infiltratemusic.com/artists/skrip/

Adriel Cruz (born February 19, 1987), who goes by the stage name Skrip stylized as SKRIP, is an American Christian hip hop musician and producer. He released two independent albums, 2011's The Und_rscore and Becoming All Things, which caught the attention of Infiltrate Music. They signed him, and his first release with the label was 2013's, The Und_rscore II, yet this failed to chart. His subsequent album, Renegades Never Die, was released in 2015 with Infiltrate Music. This was a Billboard chart breakthrough release.

== Early life ==
Skrip was born Adriel Cruz on February 19, 1987, in Chicago, Illinois.

== Music career ==
His music career started in 1999, yet his first release was The Und_rscore, which was released on June 9, 2011. He then quickly followed this up with another independently released album, Becoming All Things, on July 31, 2011. This caught the attention of Infiltrate Music, who signed him in 2012, and released, The Und_rscore II, on January 15, 2013, becoming his first studio album. The next album, Renegades Never Die, with Infiltrate Music was his second studio album, came out on February 24, 2015. The album received two reviews by Jesus Freak Hideout and a review from New Release Tuesday, Kevin Hoskins rated the album three stars, while Scott Fryberger rated the album two and a half for Jesus Freak Hideout. While Mark Ryan for New Release Tuesday rated the album three and a half stars. This album was his breakthrough release on the Billboard charts, at No. 24 on the Christian Albums, and at No. 19 on the Heatseekers Albums charts.

== Personal life ==
Skrip is married to Vanessa Cruz, who is the director of church operations at World Renegade Church, where Skrip himself is the lead pastor.

== Discography ==
=== Independent albums ===
- The Und_rscore (June 9, 2011)
- Becoming All Things (July 31, 2011)

=== Studio albums ===
List of studio albums, with selected chart positions
Title	Album details	Peak chart positions	
Title	Album details	US Chr	US Heat
The Und_rscore II	Released: January 15, 2013; Label: Infiltrate; CD, digital download	–	–
Renegades Never Die	Released: February 24, 2015; Label: Infiltrate; CD, digital download	24	19
