= Pronounced Toe-Nay =

Studio album by Tonéx
- Released: September 26, 2000
- Recorded: August–September 1997
- Genres: R&B; Gospel
- Labels: Jive Records/Verity Records; MSS Records; Rescue Records
- Producer: Tonéx

Tonéx chronology
Damage (1995)	Pronounced Toe-Nay (2000)	Circu$$ (2000)

Professional ratings
Review scores
Source	Rating
AllMusic	4/5 stars
Entertainment Weekly	C+

Pronounced Toe-Nay is a studio album by the American gospel music singer Tonéx. It was released via Verity Records and Jive Records in 2000.

It peaked at No. 12 on the Billboard Top Gospel Albums chart.

== Critical reception ==
In a 2010 profile, The New Yorker called Pronounced Toe-Nay a "breakthrough album ... [that] marked the arrival of a major new voice in gospel music," writing that "'Personal Jesus' had a spaced-out funk groove that recalled Sly & the Family Stone."

== Track listing ==
1. Radio
2. Pronounced Toe-Nay
3. It's On Like That (featuring Jaz)
4. One Good Reason (featuring Big J)
5. The Good Song
6. Personal Jesus
7. Trinity
8. U Send Me
9. The 1 U Need
10. Real 2 Me
11. Why?
12. Waiting
13. Taxi
14. As I Played
15. Real With U
16. Cry No More
17. Make Me Right (featuring ATaQ)
18. Restoration
19. Untitled (featuring E.B. Williams)
20. One Good Reason (92105 Myx)
21. P.T. 2001
