= Sean C. Johnson =

American rapper

- Born: Sean Cornelius Johnson; September 9
- Origin: Del City, Oklahoma, U.S.
- Genres: Christian R&B; Christian hip hop; contemporary gospel; contemporary R&B
- Occupations: Singer, songwriter, rapper
- Instrument: Vocals
- Years active: 2005–present
- Label: CIRCA 1993
- Website: seancjohnson.com

Sean Cornelius Johnson (born September 9), is an American Christian R&B and Christian hip hop musician. He started making music in 2005, releasing five studio albums, Simply a Vessel (2006), Simply a Vessel, Vol 2: Faithful (2009), Simply a Vessel, Vol 3: Surrender All (2012), Circa 1993 (2015) and Race the Sun (2016), and two extended plays, Joy (2011) and Grateful (2013).

== Early life ==
Sean Cornelius Johnson was born on September 9 to a military father in the United States Air Force and his mother, Althea Johnson. The family would move often with stops in Germany, Philadelphia, Kentucky, and Clarksville, Tennessee because of his father's job. His mother died on February 7, 1993, when he was at the age of eleven.

== Music career ==
His music record career began in 2005, with his first release, Simply a Vessel, a studio album, that was released in January 2006. The next release, Simply a Vessel, Vol 2: Faithful, another studio album, was released in 2009. He released, Joy, an extended play, in 2011. His third studio album, Simply a Vessel, Vol. 3: Surrender All, was released in 2012. The second extended play, Grateful, was released in 2013. He released, Circa 1993, another studio album, in 2015. His fifth studio album/EP, Race the Sun was released in 2016, consisting of a compilation of different tracks.

== Personal life ==
He resides in Del City, Oklahoma.

== Discography ==
Studio albums

- Simply a Vessel (2006)
- Simply a Vessel, Vol 2: Faithful (2009)
- Simply a Vessel, Vol 3: Surrender All (2012)
- Circa 1993 (2015)
- Race the Sun (2016)
- Days Like This (2018)

EPs

- Joy (2011)
- Grateful (2013).
