= Cheno Lyfe =

American Christian hip hop musician

- Also known as: Cheno Lyfe
- Born: Rameses Echevarria; November 3, 1980 (age 45); Brooklyn, New York
- Origin: Miami, Florida, U.S.
- Genres: Christian hip hop, urban contemporary gospel
- Occupations: Singer, songwriter
- Instruments: vocals, singer-songwriter
- Years active: 2008–present
- Label: Good City

Rameses Echevarria (born November 3, 1980), who goes by the stage name Cheno Lyfe (Christ Hearted Evangelist Now Offering Lyfe), is an American Christian hip hop musician. He is signed to Good City Music, and together they released Lunar in 2013. This was his breakthrough album on the Billboard charts.

== Early life ==
Cheno Lyfe was born on November 3, 1980, as Rameses Echevarria in Brooklyn, New York, who moved to Miami, Florida as a youngster. He is of Cuban descent, and is a first-generation American, since his mother, Xiomara Echevarria, was born in Cuba. He was arrested and served 5 years in prison in his early twenties.

== Personal life ==
Cheno Lyfe married Lydia Echevarria, which they have four kids, Jadel, Rameses Jr., Levi and Abigail . They reside in Atlanta.

== Music career ==
Cheno Lyfe was signed to Good City Music, and released Lunar on July 23, 2013. This album was his breakthrough release on the Billboard Top Gospel Albums chart. The album was reviewed by Wade-O Radio, and Jam the Hype.

== Discography ==
=== Studio albums ===
List of studio albums, with selected chart positions
Title	Album details	Peak chart positions
Title	Album details	US Gos
Lunar	Released: July 23, 2013; Label: Good City; CD, digital download	48
