= Michael L. Brown =

American author and radio host

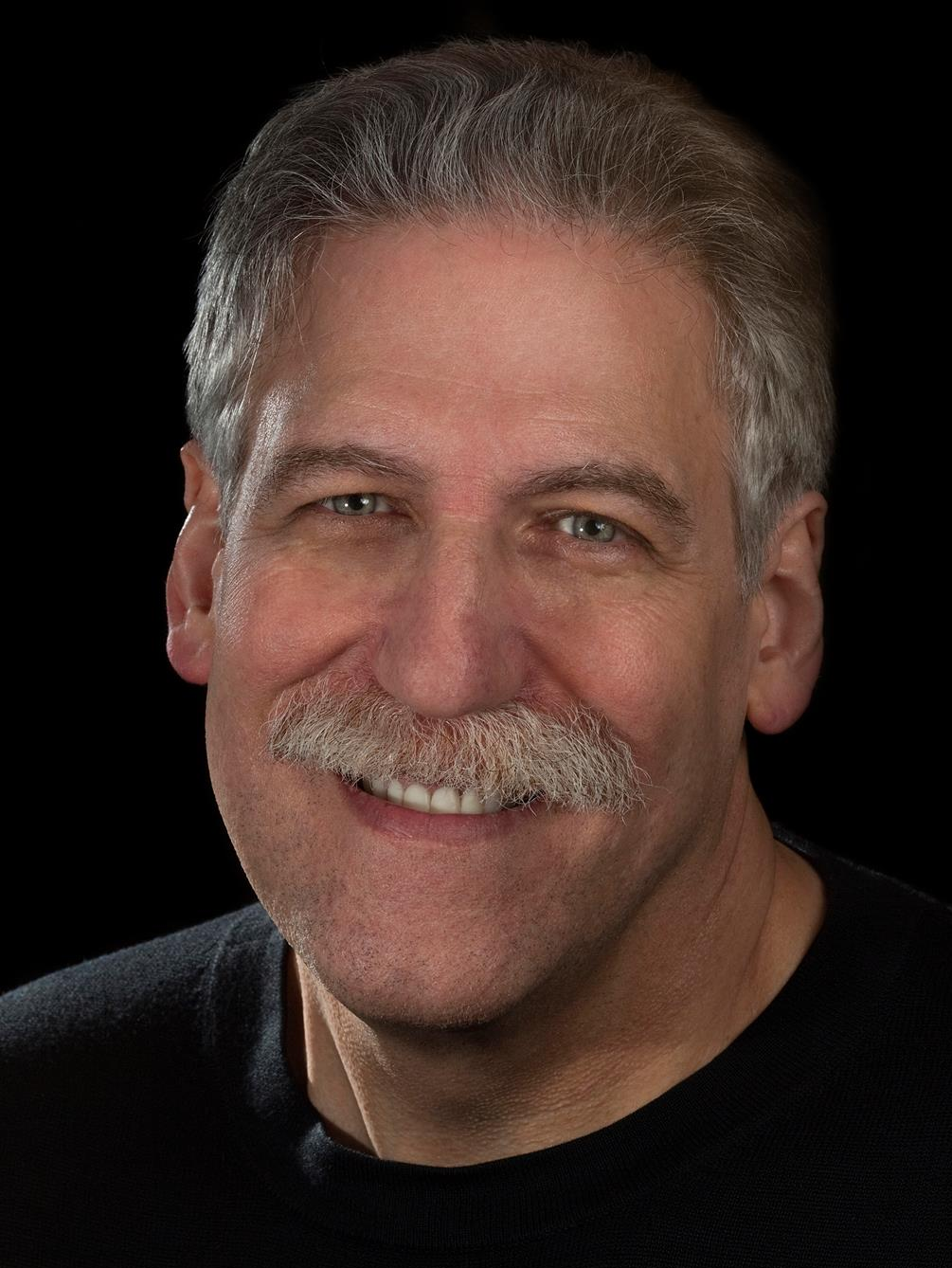
- Brown in 2014
- Born: March 16, 1955 (age 71); New York, New York, U.S.
- Education: Queens College (BA); New York University (MA, PhD)
- Occupations: Radio host, professor
- Political party: Independent
- Spouse: Nancy Gurian Conway Brown (married 1977)
- Website: www.askdrbrown.org

Michael L. Brown (born March 16, 1955) is an American radio host, author, apologist, activist, and proponent of Messianic Judaism, Christian Zionism, and the Charismatic Movement. His nationally syndicated radio show, The Line of Fire, airs throughout the United States. He contributes articles to the Christian news platform The Stream as well as to the news site Townhall, and serves as head of the Coalition of Conscience, a Christian organization in the Charlotte, North Carolina area.

== Academic and ministry roles ==
Brown was raised Jewish and holds Fundamentalist Pentecostal views. After graduating from Queens College in 1977 with a Bachelor of Arts in Hebrew, he earned a Master of Arts and his Ph.D. from New York University in Near Eastern languages and literatures in 1981 and 1985, respectively.

Brown is president and professor of practical theology at FIRE School of Ministry in Concord, NC. He has also served as visiting professor of Old Testament at Trinity Evangelical Divinity School in Deerfield, Illinois and visiting professor of Jewish apologetics at Fuller Theological Seminary, School of World Mission as well as several other seminaries.

Between 1996 and 2000, Brown was one of the leaders in the Brownsville Revival, a Charismatic movement that began on June 18, 1995, at the Brownsville Assembly of God church in Pensacola, Florida. In 2000, though, the board removed Brown from his position as president of Brownsville Revival School of Ministry (BRSM).

In 2001, Brown started the FIRE School of Ministry, a Charismatic leadership training institute heavily influenced by the revival movement from which Brown was removed. In 2005 Brown founded another revivalist organization called ICN Ministries. The organization intends to spread the revivalist message to places like Israel, other Christian organizations, and other places where Brown has influence.

== Public criticism ==
Brown has been criticized in Charlotte by the local LGBT community for holding a rally in protest of their 2009 Charlotte Pride Festival. The Southern Poverty Law Center has profiled him for his promotion of "junk science" on topics connected to sexual orientation, such as in his regular claims that, rather than being genetic, homosexuality is caused by childhood trauma, as well as his support for conversion therapy. In September 2012, the organization named him in their list of "30 New Activists Heading Up the Radical Right." In March 2014, Brown traveled to Peru to oppose the legalization of gay marriage there. He has also defended Uganda's criminalization of homosexuality, saying that the law was necessary to fight the spread of AIDS/HIV and combat pedophilia. But he also posted on his website that he "renounces" homophobic views, such as advocated by Steven Anderson (who called for the death penalty for homosexuals) and said that "gay people should be treated with respect and dignity".

Brown was criticized for citing the white supremacist website Stormfront in an article "asking whether it was time for another Jesus Movement among Jewish millennials". He apologized, saying he was not aware what the site was.

== Theological beliefs ==
Brown holds to Arminian and Jewish tenets.

== Allegations and investigation ==
In December 2024, allegations were raised against Brown by a former FIRE School of Ministry employee, identified by the pseudonym "Erin". Erin alleged that Brown engaged in inappropriate interactions, including hand-holding, swats on the backside, and kisses on the lips, during her employment at the ministry.

Brown denied any sexual misconduct but admitted to "a definite lack of judgment" in his interactions with Erin. He described the relationship as nonsexual and familial. In response, The Line of Fire Board launched a third-party investigation, with a commitment to publicly releasing the results.

The Firefly Independent Sexual Abuse Investigations Report, prepared by James Holler Jr. and released on 18 April 2025, concluded that Brown engaged in inappropriate interactions with two women: Sarah Monk (identified as IS #2), a former FIRE School member, and a married woman within the congregation (IS #1). The report found that Brown's interactions with IS #2 involved hand-holding, kissing, and swatting on the buttocks. Although Brown characterized these actions as familial, the investigation determined that they constituted breaches of appropriate boundaries expected of a ministerial role. The investigation further disclosed that Brown admitted to what he described as an "emotional affair" with IS #1, a married woman, while denying any physical relationship. The report ultimately concluded that Brown's conduct did not meet the ethical standards expected of a ministry leader, thereby undermining trust within the organization.

On May 9, 2025, two people who testified in the Firefly Investigation released a 134-page "Witnesses Report" that asserted that Brown's inappropriate behavior with IS #1 and IS #2 was more extensive than that suggested by Firefly, and that between 2004 and 2025 Brown repeatedly rebuffed attempts to get him to recognize that his behavior had been inappropriate.

== Publications ==
- How Saved Are We?: Has the Church Fallen Asleep in the Enemy's Lap? (1990) ISBN 978-1560430551
- Our Hands Are Stained with Blood: The Tragic Story of the Church and the Jewish People (1992) ISBN 978-1560430681
- It's Time to Rock the Boat: A Call to God's People to Rise Up and Preach a Confrontational Gospel (1993) ISBN 978-1560431060
- The End of the American Gospel Enterprise (1993) ISBN 978-1560430025
- Israel's Divine Healer (1995) ISBN 978-0310200291
- Let No One Deceive You: Confronting the Critics of Revival (1997) ISBN 978-1560436935
- Go and Sin No More: A Call to Holiness (1999) ISBN 978-0615730196
- Revolution!: The Call to Holy War (2000) ISBN 978-0830726400
- Answering Jewish Objections to Jesus (file listing). Ada, MI: Baker Books. Archived from the original on January 5, 2019.
  1. Brown, Michael L. (2000). General and Historical Objections (PDF). Vol. 1. Baker Books. ISBN 978-0-8010-6063-2.
  2. Brown, Michael L. (2000). Theological Objections (PDF). Vol. 2. Baker Publishing. ISBN 978-0-8010-6334-3.
  3. Brown, Michael L. (2003). Messianic Prophecy Objections (PDF). Vol. 3. Baker Publishing. ISBN 978-0-8010-6423-4.
  4. Brown, Michael L. (2006). New Testament Objections (PDF). Vol. 4. Baker Publishing. ISBN 978-0-8010-6426-5.
  5. Brown, Michael L. (2010). Traditional Jewish Objections (EPUB). Vol. 5. Baker Books. ISBN 978-1-881022-86-2. Archived from the original on January 5, 2019.
- The Revival Answer Book: Rightly Discerning the Contemporary Revival Movements (2001) ISBN 978-0830726417
- What Do Jewish People Think about Jesus?: And Other Questions Christians Ask about Jewish Beliefs, Practices, and History (2007) ISBN 978-0800794262
- A Time for Holy Fire: Preparing the Way for Divine Visitation (2008) ISBN 978-0981530413
- 60 Questions Christians Ask About Jewish Beliefs and Practices (2011) ISBN 978-0800795047
- A Queer Thing Happened to America: And What a Long, Strange Trip It's Been (2011) ISBN 978-0615406091
- The Real Kosher Jesus: Revealing the Mysteries of the Hidden Messiah (2012) ISBN 978-1621360070
- Hyper-Grace: Exposing the Dangers of the Modern Grace Message (2014) ISBN 978-1621365891
- Can You Be Gay and Christian?: Responding With Love and Truth to Questions About Homosexuality (2014) ISBN 978-1621365938
- Authentic Fire: A Response to John MacArthur's Strange Fire (2015)
- Jezebel's War With America: The Plot to Destroy Our Country and What We Can Do to Turn the Tide (2019) ISBN 978-1629996660

=== With others ===
- Jeremiah--Ezekiel (The Expositor's Bible Commentary) (2010) with Tremper Longman III, David E. Garland, Paul Ferris Jr. ISBN 978-0-310-23499-9
- Tree of Life Version (2014) with Jeffrey Seif et al. ISBN 978-0-9907081-1-7
- Breaking the Stronghold of Food: How We Conquered Food Addictions and Discovered a New Way of Living (2017) With his wife Nancy Brown
- Not Afraid of the Antichrist: Why We Don't Believe in a Pre-Tribulation Rapture (2019) with Craig S. Keener ISBN 978-0-8007-9916-8

=== Contributions ===
- Oxford Dictionary of Jewish Religion
- Theological Dictionary of the Old Testament.

== Videos ==
=== Channel ===
ASKDrBrown - YouTube channel

=== Debates ===
Opponent	Topic	Date	References
E. Michael Jones & Owen Benjamin	"Are Dr. E. Michael Jones and Owen Benjamin Telling the Truth?"	11 May 2019	
Rabbi Jacob Immanuel Schochet	"Is Jesus the Jewish Messiah?"	30 March 1995	
Rabbi Tovia Singer	"Is Jesus the Messiah?"	1 November 2015	
David Blumofe (RZA)	"Who is Jesus?"	16 December 2010	
Rabbi Shmuley Boteach	"Can Jews Believe in Jesus?"	10 December 2008	
Rabbi Daniel Freitag	"Is Jesus the Jewish Messiah?"	3 March 2017	
