= Je'kob =

American rapper

- Also known as: Je'kob
- Born: Jacob Ernest Washington; June 16, 1981 (age 45); San Antonio, Texas, U.S.
- Origin: San Diego, California, U.S.
- Genres: Christian hip hop, urban contemporary gospel
- Occupations: Singer, songwriter
- Instrument: Vocals
- Years active: 2011–present
- Labels: Save the City, Jekobmade Musiq
- Website: jekob.com

Jacob Ernest Washington (born June 16, 1981), who goes by the stage name Je'kob, is an American Christian hip hop and urban contemporary gospel musician. He has released one studio album, This Side of the Sky in 2014, while this charted on the Billboard magazine charts. He has released three extended plays, Faith, Hope, and Love in 2012, where the first two charted. His first compilation album, Faith Hope Love in 2013, was the unification of all three extended play's on one album.

== Early life ==
Jacob Ernest Washington was born in San Antonio, Texas to mother Paulette Gail Washington (née, Histo) and military father Ernest Rudolph Washington. Due to his father's military service, Washington's family relocated several times, during which each of the Washington children were born in different states. Washington's older brother, Joshua Joel Washington, was born in Kentucky in 1979. His younger sister, Rachael Rose Messini (née, Washington), was born in Hawaii in 1984. The family finally settled in San Diego, California, where they are all currently located. Along with Washington's brother and sister, Washington formed the group Souljahz. Once older brother Joshua broke with the Souljahz, the remaining two renamed the group "The Washington Projects."

== Music career ==
Washington's solo music career started with the mixtape Pocketless Souls, released on October 10, 2011. His next three projects were extended plays, Faith on July 31, 2012, Hope on October 30, 2012, and Love on December 18, 2012; the first two charted on the Billboard magazine Gospel Albums chart at Nos. 30 and 42 respectively. The first compilation album, Faith Hope Love, was released on February 12, 2013 through Save the City Records, a unification of all three previously released extended plays. Washington's second mixtape, Pocketless Souls II, was released on December 31, 2013. His first studio album, This Side of the Sky, was released on October 7, 2014 by Jekobmade Musiq. This album would chart on the aforementioned chart at No. 25.

== Discography ==
Albums

- Faith Hope Love
- This Side of the Sky

EPs

- Faith
- Hope
- Love

Mixtapes

- Pocketless Souls
- Pocketless Souls II
