= Brinson (rapper) =

American rapper (born 1989)

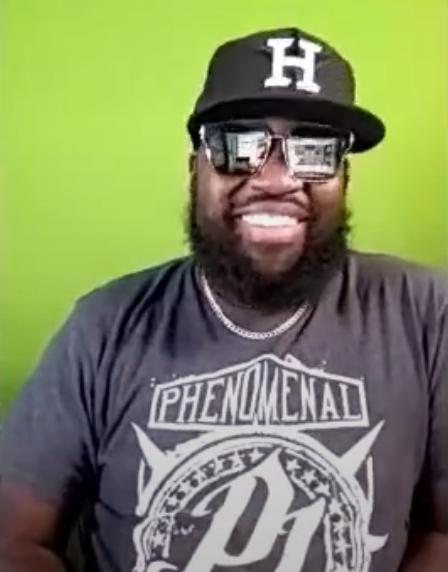
- Brinson in 2021

Background information
- Also known as: Brinson
- Born: Brinson James Wright; August 5, 1989 (age 36)
- Origin: Jacksonville, Florida, US
- Genres: Christian hip hop
- Occupations: Singer, songwriter
- Instrument: Vocals
- Years active: 2008–present
- Label: GodChaserz Entertainment
- Member of: All the King's Men
- Website: godchaserz.com iambrinson.com

Brinson James Wright (born August 5, 1989), who goes by the stage name Brinson, is an American rapper. He has released ten studio albums since 2008.

== Early life ==
Wright was born Brinson James Wright, on August 5, 1989 in Jacksonville, Florida, to Gerald and Marion Wright. He attended Belmont University in Nashville, Tennessee to study in their Music Business department.

== Music career ==
Brinson's music career started in 2006, as he released his first studio album, Escaping Me, on September 23 of that year, from GodChaserz Entertainment. The subsequent studio album, OMG, was released on November 2, 2010, by GodChaserz Entertainment. His third studio album, No Other Heroes, was released October 23, 2012, from GodChaserz Entertainment. He released, Until We Meet Again, on August 4, 2015, with GodChaserz Entertainment.

He is part of the rap collective All the King's Men, with CStraight and ReadyWriter, and they released their first album, All the King's Men, on September 30, 2014, from GodChaserz Entertainment, where Brinson is the sole operator.

== Ministry ==
He is currently a podcast host of the GodChaserz Podcast on iTunes. Also, Brinson hosts an event called "Beyond Christmas" every December, where he has coordinated donations of over 20,000 toys and spending over $300,000 in support of local hospitals in Jacksonville, Florida.

== Discography ==
=== Albums ===
- Escaping Me (September 23, 2008)
- OMG (November 2, 2010)
- No Other Heroes (October 23, 2012)
- All the King's Men (July 22, 2014)
- Until We Meet Again (August 4, 2015)
- BLACK CANVAS: UWMA 2 (June 3, 2016)
- Thornz: UWMA 3 (August 25, 2017)
- Vibranium (February 16, 2018)
- Reversing Tomorrow (April 25, 2019)
- Throw The Crown (July 24, 2020)
- Before He Cracks The Sky (July 21, 2022)
- Lord Prepare a Table (October 20, 2023)
- Acknowledge Him(The New BloodLine) (November 6, 2024)
