= Hazakim =

American Christian hip-hop duo

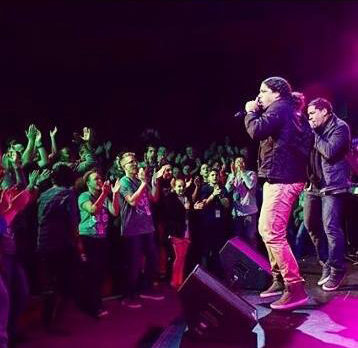

Background information
- Origin: Columbus, Ohio
- Genres: Christian hip hop, Urban contemporary gospel
- Years active: 1997–present
- Labels: Lamp Mode, Wrath & Grace
- Members: Anthony "Tony" Wray; Michael "Mike" Wray

Hazakim, (pronounced ha-zah-keem), is a Christian hip hop duo originally from Columbus, Ohio. The group consists of brothers Michael "Mike" Wray and Anthony "Tony" Wray. Hazakim is known for hip hop music that is uniquely Messianic; even rapping and singing in Hebrew, at times, over beats with traditional Mizrahi rhythms. The name Hazakim is a Hebrew word, meaning in English "the strong ones".

== Early life ==
Michael "Mike" Wray, the eldest born, and Anthony "Tony" Wray, the youngest born were brought up in the messianic Jewish movement by their parents. They come from a multi-ethnic family consisting of Portuguese, Jewish, Jamaican, Italian, and Amazigh ancestry.

In episode of The Chopping Block (a Lampmode Records YouTube series), Michael stated that he first heard Christian Hip Hop as a small child in 1986, with Stephen Wiley's "Bible Break". However, he never intended to become a hip hop artist, until upon hearing The Cross Movement's album "Heaven's Mentality"

== Music career ==
Hazakim started making music in 1997. Their first release in 1999 was an independent self-titled EP with three songs, most notably "Liar, Lunatic, Lord, Or Legend" which is the only song from the EP on streaming services. In 2003, the duo came back with another independent EP, "Theophanies EP".

In 2001 they released their first full-length album, also an independent effort aptly titled Hip-Hologetics due to its fusion of rap music and biblical apologetics. They became signed to Lamp Mode Recordings prior to their 2009 release, Theophanies. Their sophomore release under Lamp Mode entitled Son of Man was released on September 23, 2014; the eve of Rosh Hashanah in light of the album's eschatological focus. This exposure helped the duo crack the Billboard charts, twice.

In January 2016 the brothers released a music video for a single entitled "Don't Forget the Ayin" which was shot on location in Tel Aviv and Jerusalem. According to the duo, the song was created to help "remove the stigma" surrounding Yeshua among Israelis, in what they call "the Jewish reclamation of Jesus."

In December 2018 it was announced that Hazakim was set to release another album titled Origins, though no release date had been given. On February 1, 2019, they released Origins on Wrath and Grace Records, a burgeoning Christian hip-hop label. Reviews of the album were overwhelmingly positive; with some stating that Origins is the duo's best release to date, while others have compared its impact to their earlier Theophanies. The focus of Origins is to provide an argument or defense of biblical creationism and intelligent design. Origins includes production from Hazakim, as well as contributions from composer John Campbell, as well as hip-hop producers SPEC, Sean Rocktight Jones (Walter Rocktight) and Devin Morrison.

In June 2025, the duo released their first single in 6 years titled "Two Cities that Burned". The song, with its contemporary style drums and trap music cadence over a theatrical string sample, uses the biblical story of divine wrath against the ancient cities of Sodom and Gomorrah as a parallel to the present day. The music video for the song, set in a school classroom, features themes of divine judgment, media propaganda, and social indoctrination. "Two Cities that Burned" was released on the Wrath and Grace platform.

The video for "Two Cities that Burned" was reviewed and featured on the "Podcraft" podcast show of Wu-Tang Clan affiliate Killah Priest, who praised the song as "superb" and touted it as one of the best uses of the "modern flow" that he has heard.

In addition to vocals, Mike and Tony do the majority of their own production. The brothers now reside in Broward County, Florida.

== Political views ==
In 2024, during the 2024 pro-Palestinian protests on university campuses, during which Jewish students were threatened and barred from entering facilities on campuses across America, Anthony was discovered as attempting to uncover antisemitism among the University of South Florida's progressive anti-Israel activist circle. Anthony is reported to have given a false name and identity, in an effort to expose or rule out dangerous sentiments against Jews, from individuals affiliated with the school's protest movement. While accusations of conservative political motives were touted by progressive journalists, the details and motives of the controversy have never been confirmed by Hazakim or its affiliates.

== Members ==
- Michael Wray
- Anthony (Tony) Wray

== Discography ==
=== Studio albums ===
List of studio albums, with selected details and chart positions
Title	Album details	Peak chart positions	
Title	Album details	US Chr.	US Gos.
Theophanies	Released: June 23, 2009; Label: Lamp Mode; Formats: CD, digital download	—	—
Son of Man	Released: September 23, 2014; Label: Lamp Mode; Formats: CD, digital download	40	10
Origins	Released: February 1, 2019; Label: Wrath & Grace; Formats: CD, digital download	—	—
