= L.E.D? =

- Origin: Cornwall, England
- Genres: Christian pop, Christian EDM, Christian R&B, Christian hip hop, electropop
- Years active: 2010–present
- Members: Jon Alford; Chris Uglow; Nikki Uglow; Rich Smith
- Website: led-band.com

L.E.D? are an English Christian music quartet, who plays electropop from a Christian pop, Christian EDM, Christian R&B, and Christian hip hop perspective and worldview, while hailing from Cornwall, England. They have released one studio album, Jericho in 2015, and three extended plays prior to the album; Just Dance in 2011, Flip the Switch in 2013, and Re:MIXD in 2014.

== Background ==
L.E.D? are from Cornwall, England. Their members are Chris Uglow, Nikki Uglow, Rich Smith, and Jon Alford.

== Music history ==
They started as a musical entity in 2010, with their first extended play, Just Dance, that released in 2011. Their subsequent extended play, Flip the Switch, was released on 5 August 2013. The third extended play, Re:MIXD, was released on 2 August 2014. Their first studio album, Jericho, was released on 27 April 2015.

== Members ==
Current members

- Jon Alford
- Chris Uglow
- Nikki Uglow
- Rich Smith

== Discography ==
=== Studio albums ===
- Jericho (27 April 2015)

=== EPs ===
- Just Dance (2011)
- Flip the Switch (5 August 2013)
- Re:MIXD (3 August 2014)
