= Timothy Brindle =

American rapper

- Born: Timothy E. Brindle; November 7, 1980 (age 45); Philadelphia, Pennsylvania
- Genres: Christian hip hop, urban contemporary gospel
- Occupations: Singer, songwriter, bible preacher and teacher of the gospel of Jesus Christ
- Instrument: Vocals
- Years active: 2003–present
- Label: Lamp Mode
- Website: timothybrindleministries.com, lampmode.com

Timothy E. Brindle (born November 7, 1980), is an American Christian hip hop lyricist. He is also a pastor at Church of the Covenant (OPC) in Hackettstown, New Jersey, and the Senior Stewardship Officer at Westminster Theological Seminary in Philadelphia, where he is a PhD Student in Old Testament. His music and speaking ministry seeks "to make known the Glory of Christ from Genesis to Revelation."

== Early life ==
Brindle was born Timothy Edward Brindle, in Pittsburgh, Pennsylvania on November 7, 1980.

== Personal life ==
He is married to Floriana Brindle, whose family is from Angola. Her parents fled the country because of the Angolan Civil War so that Floriana was born in a refugee camp in Botswana, but she moved to the United States city of Philadelphia, when she was just four with her family. They reside together in Philadelphia with their 8 children.

Timothy studies at Westminster Theological Seminary, where he completed the Master of Divinity program in 2016. He began the Th.M. in Old Testament that year, and is now a student in the PhD program in Old Testament at Westminster where he serves full-time as the Senior Stewardship Officer.

== Music career ==
Timothy Brindle was the first artist on Lamp Mode Recordings, when the label began in 2003. Lamp Mode released The Great Awakening in 2003, then a re-release in 2005, which celebrates the new birth of God's Sovereign Monergistic Regeneration. His second album, inspired by John's Owen's Mortification of Sin book, is called Killing Sin and was released in 2005.The Restoration was released in 2012, and the following year Timothy Brindle collaborated with Stephen the Levite and Zae da Blacksmith to form a group called "The Collective" in which they released an album in 2013 by that name to fund their European Mission Trip. The Restoration charted on one Billboard chart. Wade-O Radio said "This album was a lyrical masterpiece." On April 20, 2018, Brindle released another album titled The Unfolding. The album's focus was the theme of redemption, from the Old to New Testament, as found in the Bible. In The Unfolding Brindle asserts that redemptive history finds its culmination and fulfillment in Jesus Christ. The Unfolding was available in digital as well as print formats and was accompanied by a 400-page book of the same title.

== Discography ==
=== Studio albums ===
List of studio albums, with selected chart positions
Title	Album details	Peak chart positions
Title	Album details	US Gos
The Great Awakening	Released: June 6, 2003, Re-released 2005; Label: Lamp Mode; CD, digital download	–
Killing Sin	Released: October 28, 2005; Label: Lamp Mode; CD, digital download	–
The Restoration	Released: July 24, 2012; Label: Lamp Mode; CD, digital download	30
The Collective (Timothy Brindle, Stephen the Levite, and Zae da Blacksmith)	Released: March 19, 2013; Label: Lamp Mode; CD, digital download	–
The Unfolding	Released: April 20, 2018; Label: Lamp Mode; CD, digital download	–
