= Oak Park 92105 =

Studio album by Tonéx
- Released: 2003/2006
- Genre: R&B; Gospel
- Label: Nureau Ink
- Producer: T. Bizzy, Chizmatonic

Tonéx chronology
Ain't Remyx (2005)	Oak Park 92105 (2003)	Oak Park 921'o6 (2006)

Oak Park 92105 is an independent studio album and eleventh release overall by American gospel music singer Tonéx. It was released under independent label Nureau Ink in 2003 and was a hard-to-find underground release which was later re-released in 2006 on iTunes. The album carries the name of "first Christian-based explicit album". The 2003 version of Oak Park 92105 had the 4 different songs "Flow", "Let's Stay In Love", "Total Praise" and "One Sunday Morning".

== Track listing ==
Disc 1

1. California
2. Santa Margarita
3. Checkmate
4. Anthony
5. Chollas Parkway
6. U Need The Master
7. Can't U See?
8. Alrite (Version 4.0)
9. Tippy (featuring Rhonda Patton)
10. My Friend (featuring Chizmatonic)
11. Good 2 Me (featuring Glenn McKinney Sr)
12. Natural

Disc 2

1. I Found Love
2. Insanity
3. The Blue Mood Ring
4. Now
5. Out The Game (featuring Gibraan)
6. When My Words R Few
7. Feelings (featuring Karen Carpenter)
8. Easier Said Than Done
9. Pain
10. Sometimes
11. Yahtzee
12. Yes (featuring Montell Jordan)
