= Kim Heesun =

South Korean writer (born 1972)

- Born: December 6, 1972 (age 53); South Korea
- Education: Kangwon National University
- Occupations: Novelist, pharmacist
- Years active: 2011–present

Korean name
- Hangul: 김희선
- RR: Gim Huiseon
- MR: Kim Hŭisŏn

Kim Heesun (Hangul 김희선; born 1972) is a South Korean writer. She made her literary debut in 2011 when her short story “Gyoyugui tansaeng” (교육의 탄생 The Birth of Education) won the Writer's World Award for New Writers. Her short story collection Ramyeonui hwangje (라면의 황제 Emperor of Instant Noodles) and novel Muhanui chaek (무한의 책 Book of Infinity) were published in 2015 and 2017, respectively.

== Life ==
Kim Heesun attended Chuncheon Girls' High School and studied pharmacy at Kangwon National University, both of which are located in the South Korean province of Gangwon. After graduation she opened a pharmacy in Wonju, Gangwon and ran it for ten years. Kim's literary work reflects her experience of managing a pharmacy in a province that has a large elderly population, underdeveloped neighborhoods, and some of the best preserved nature spots in South Korea. In an interview, Kim talks about her customers, who were mostly poor or old: “I remember their coarse hands as they held out the money for their medicine to me . . . I heard countless stories from them, and I want to impart my respect for them in my characters.”

Kim closed down her pharmacy when she got married. The extra free time rekindled her love for literature and in 2011 she enrolled in the Korean literature program at Dongguk University Graduate School to study creative writing. In fall that year, she submitted a short story to the Korean literary journal Writer’s World and succeeded in publishing her work. Currently, she writes while working part-time at a hospital as a pharmacist.

== Writing ==
Kim Heesun's works are noted for their imaginative premises. They introduce new twists to familiar subjects, as shown in “Jisang choedaeui sho” (지상최대의 쇼 The Greatest Show on Earth) and its sequels “Gyeongiroun dosi” (경이로운 도시 City of Marvels) and “Ijeneun uriga he-eojyeoya hal sigan” (이제는 우리가 헤어져야 할 시간 Time to Say Goodbye). The series takes place in “City W,” where a UFO appears one day. The UFO hovers in mid-air for a month without taking any other action. Just as the panic-stricken residents of City W begin to regain calm, aliens descend from the UFO. But to the residents’ surprise, the aliens do not attack or own super-advanced technologies; they are space refugees who fled from a doomed planet. City W renovates a closed school to house the aliens in exchange for their labor. Kim combines strange extraterrestrial elements with the familiar realities of overworked and underpaid workers.

Kim's debut short story “Gyoyugui tansaeng” (교육의 탄생 The Birth of Education) involves a conspiracy theory about the origins of the National Charter of Education (promulgated by the Park Chung-hee administration in 1968, the Charter was included on the first page of South Korean textbooks for all grades until 1994 and recited by students at school ceremonies in the 1970s). The story claims this Charter was inspired by a former Soviet scientist's theory that reciting a mantra can brainwash the reciter because the sound vibrations produced cause irreversible and permanent change to the brain. Dr. Mlodinow, a fictional character, has developed this theory to treat anxiety issues of astronauts. A South Korean genius named Choi Du-sik learns about the theory when he is sent to NASA and meets Dr. Mlodinow. He passes on the information to South Korean secret services. Again, Kim Heesun adds a fresh dimension—the history of the Soviet space program—to the National Charter of Education, a familiar subject to South Koreans who attended school between 1968 and 1994. Another pattern in Kim's works is that “City W” makes frequent appearances. The “W” stands for Wonju, where she used to run her pharmacy. This is revealed in “Gyeongiroun dosi” (경이로운 도시 City of Marvels) when it describes City W as being “located in the center of the Korean peninsula, in the southwest region of Gangwon” and formerly serving as the site of the provincial government building. Five of the nine short stories in Ramyeonui hwangje (라면의 황제 Emperor of Instant Noodles) are set in City W.

== Works ==
- 무한의 책 (2017) { Book of Infinity (2017) }
- 라면의 황제 (2015) { Emperor of Instant Noodles (2015) }
