= Stephen the Levite =

American rapper

- Also known as: Stephen the Levite (STL)
- Born: Darrell Lynn Bell, Jr. July 2, 1981 (age 45); San Diego County, California
- Origin: Philadelphia, Pennsylvania, U.S.
- Genres: Christian hip hop, Urban contemporary gospel
- Occupations: Singer, songwriter
- Instruments: vocals, singer-songwriter
- Years active: 2001–present
- Label: Lamp Mode
- Website: stephenthelevite.com

Darrell Lynn Bell, Jr. (born July 2, 1981), better known as Stephen the Levite or STL for short, is an American Christian hip hop musician. He was a member of the Christian hip hop group Redeemed Thought in the early 2000's, and later a member of The Collective with Timothy Brindle and Zae da Blacksmith. He is known for his complex flow patterns and multi-syllable rhyme schemes. His 2012 album The Last Missionary was his breakthrough release on the Billboard charts.

== Early life ==
Stephen the Levite was born Darrell Lynn Bell, Jr., in San Diego County, California on July 2, 1981. to Darrell Lynn Bell, Sr. and Cheryl Bell (nee, Goodrum).

== Music career ==
Stephen the Levite started making music in 2001. He became signed to Lamp Mode Recordings in 2006. To Die Is Gain was his debut album and the second album was 2010's The Forerunner. However, it took until 2012's The Last Missionary for the artist to crack the Billboard charts. New Release Tuesday rated the album four stars out of five. He is a member of Christian hip hop collective, The Collective, with Timothy Brindle and Zae da Blacksmith. Can I Be Honest? was rated four out of five by Indie Vision Music. In 2020, He released his album Still Hungry. In 2024, he featured in the song "WON'T BE LONG" In the album "EVERYDAY WE DIE (DELUXE)" By Datin, C4 Crotona, and Thvnos.

== Children ==
Stephen The Levite has four children. His first, named after his stage name, was born on February 4, 2010. He is very active on the website Scratch. His second was born on September 17, 2011. His third was born on April 28, 2017. and finally, his last child was born August 30, 2019. Though the children haven't appeared in his music videos recently, Stephen, his firstborn, appears in the music video for "Sure Thing" by S.O., as well as Stephen's "S.O.S" music video. Brooklyn, his second born, also appears in that video.

=== Studio albums ===
List of studio albums, with selected chart positions
Title	Album details	Peak chart positions		
Title	Album details	US Chr	US Gos	US Heat
To Die Is Gain	Released: 2007; Label: Lamp Mode Recordings; CD, digital download	–	–	–
The Forerunner	Released: 2010; Label: Lamp Mode; CD, digital download	–	–	–
The Last Missionary	Released: April 24, 2012; Label: Lamp Mode; CD, digital download	45	20	43
Can I Be Honest?	Released: November 18, 2014; Label: Lamp Mode; CD, digital download	–	–	–
