= Souljahz =

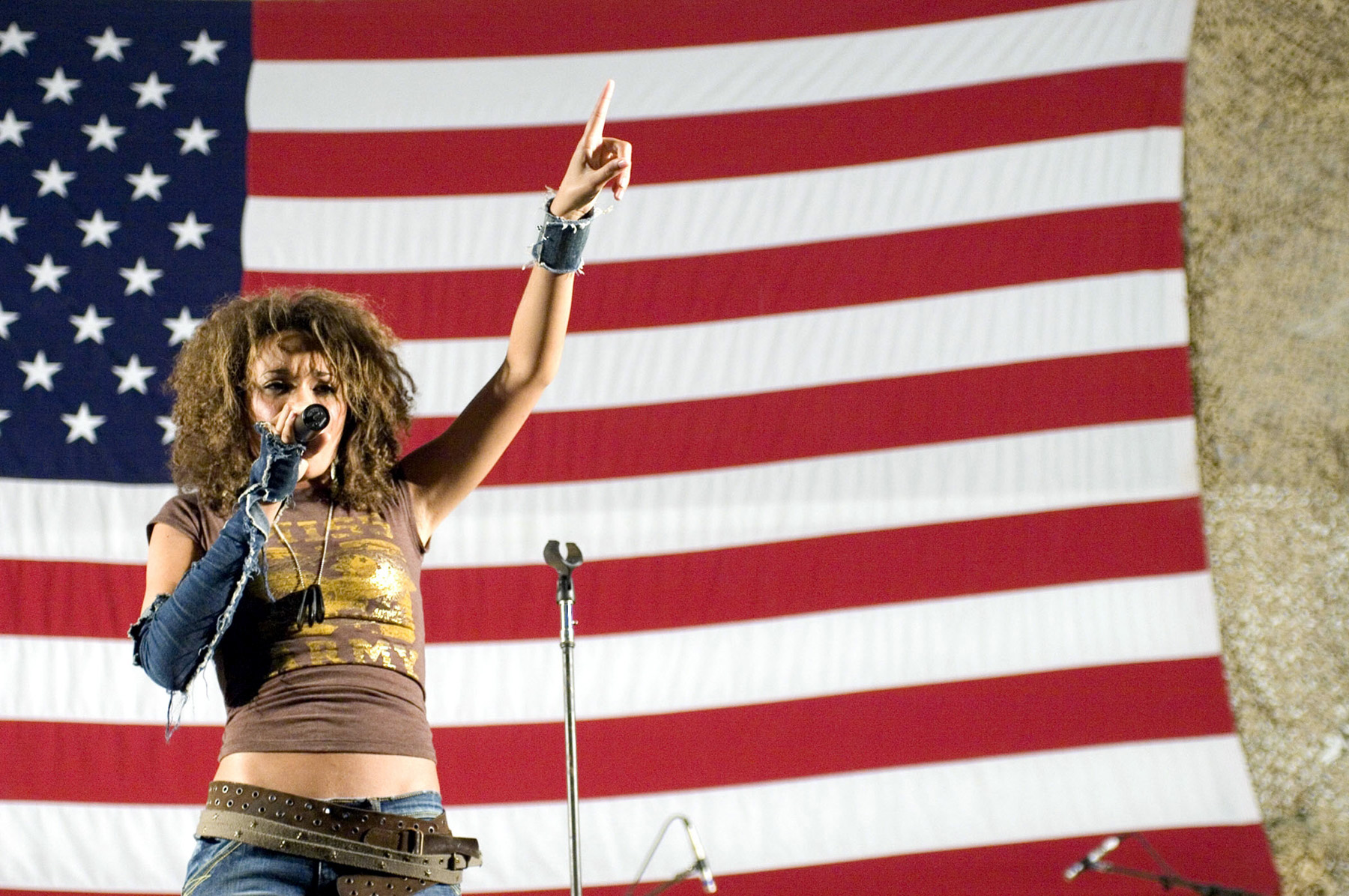
Rachael Washington of Souljahz

Souljahz was a Christian hip hop group, consisting of siblings Joshua, Jekob, and Rachael Washington, all from San Diego. Early on in their career they appeared on the pilot show for MTV's "It's your Show" and in 2002 they released their debut album, The Fault is History. The album received critical praise for its mature, in-depth lyrics and songwriting. The Souljahz have been nominated for 5 Dove Awards and have won two of them. Joshua left the project and the two remaining members decided to change the name to The Washington Projects. Their album, Commanders of The Resistance, was released on November 10, 2007. They have also performed at the USO Tour 2006 and released a song for U.S. troops called "Get Y'all Back Home". Their album, Light Up the Dark, was released in 2009. Their latest album, entitled Space Time Continuum, was released in 2012.

== Albums ==
- Souljahz: Souljahz (2000) - Eternal Funk Records
- Souljahz: The Fault is History (2002) - Warner Bros. Records
- The Washington Projects: Commanders of the Resistance (2007)
- The Washington Projects: Light Up the Dark (2009)
- The Washington Projects: Space Time Continuum (2012)
