= Eddy Puyol =

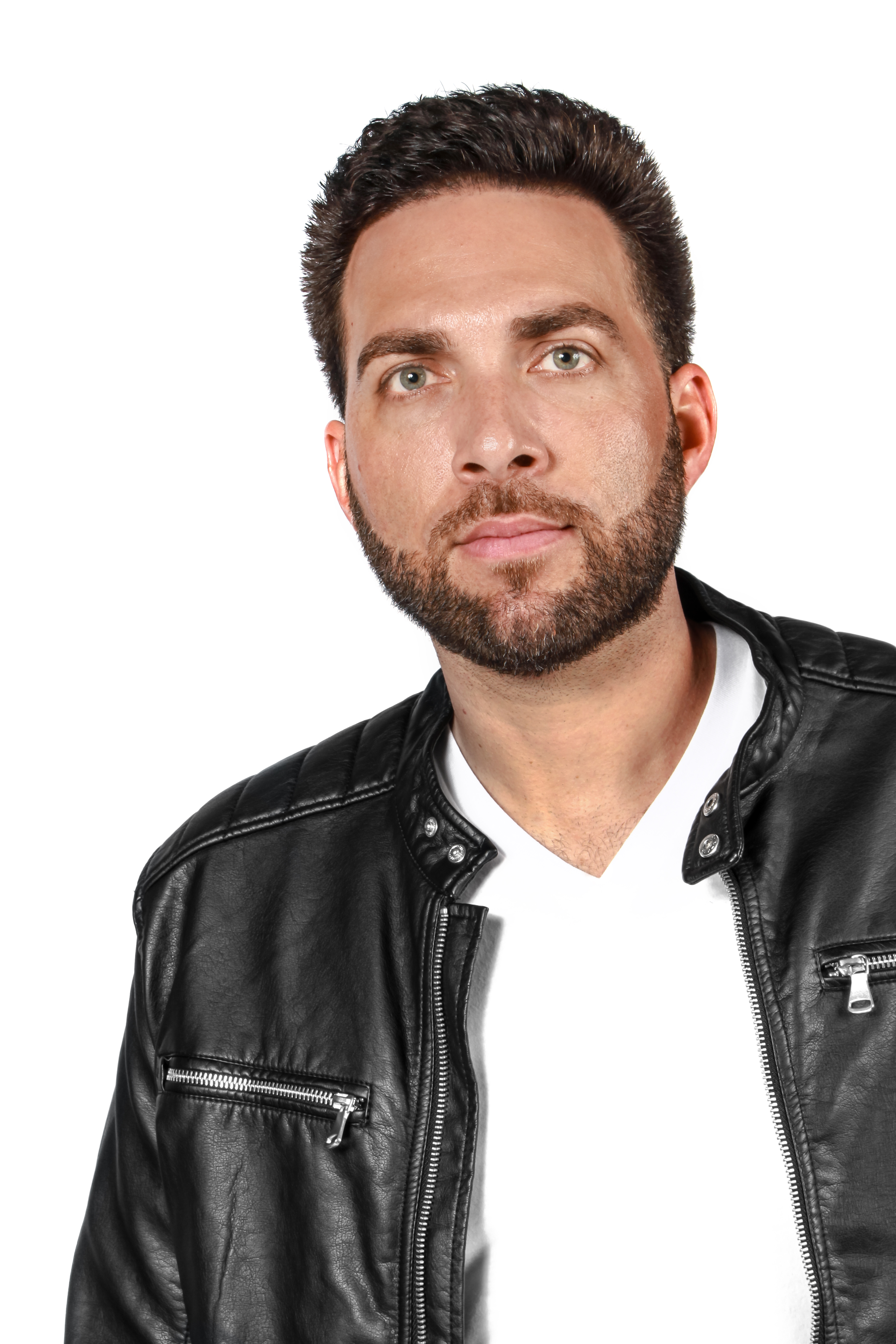
- Puyol in 2015

Background information
- Also known as: Rawsrvnt
- Born: July 4 Miami, Florida
- Genres: Christian hip hop
- Occupation: Rapper
- Years active: 2006–present
- Label: Soul Deep Records
- Website: eddypuyol.com

Eddy Puyol (pronounced "pooh-yole"; born July 4), also known earlier in his career as Rawsrvnt, is an American Christian hip hop artist and songwriter from Miami, Florida. His work has been covered by publications including Cross Rhythms, CCM Magazine, and The Palm Beach Post.

== Career ==
Puyol began releasing music in the mid-2000s under the name Rawsrvnt. His early work received coverage from Christian music publications, including Cross Rhythms, which reviewed his releases and discussed his approach to hip hop–based worship music.

His music and career have also been covered by CCM Magazine.

He performed at SunFest in West Palm Beach, Florida.

Puyol was an honoree of the Holy Hip Hop Awards.

He wrote the official theme song for the Winter Jam Tour Spectacular.

Puyol participated in the Music Inspired by The Story Tour, which featured performances by contemporary Christian artists including Casting Crowns, Steven Curtis Chapman, and Natalie Grant.

As part of the tour, he appeared in a medley segment during the 43rd GMA Dove Awards, documented on the official GMA Dove Awards YouTube channel.

In 2019, Puyol continued his career under his birth name after previously recording as Rawsrvnt.

== Television appearances ==
In 2010, Puyol appeared as a contestant on the reality television series The Ultimate Merger, which aired on TV One and starred Omarosa and Donald Trump.

During his time on the show, Puyol highlighted his Christian faith, stating that he hoped to demonstrate "what a real one looks like" in terms of approaching dating. He was eliminated in the third episode after a one-on-one conversation with Omarosa, during which he declared, "I'm in love with Jesus, off top."

== Media and sports usage ==
Puyol's music has appeared in sports-related broadcasts and events. In 2011, NASCAR driver Michael McDowell used his song "On Fire" as driver introduction music for the Bristol night race.

ESPN staff blogs have documented his songs "Game Changer" and "There Go That Man" on playlists for First Take, without specifying the duration or context of use.

He has also performed at private events attended by professional athletes. In 2012, Puyol performed at a birthday brunch for NBA player Dwyane Wade.

== Personal life ==
Puyol married Chrissy Alvarez in 2014 and they have two daughters. They divorced in 2020. He has discussed the emotional experience of this divorce in his music, as noted by CCM Magazine.

In 2023, he married his current wife Corinne Bilotta. They have a blended family of six with the addition of Corinne's son and daughter.
