= Japhia Life =

American rapper

- Also known as: Japhia Life
- Born: James E. Golding; November 23, 1977 (age 48); Philadelphia, Pennsylvania, U.S.
- Origin: Philadelphia, U.S.
- Genres: Hip hop, Christian hip hop
- Occupations: Rapper, singer, songwriter
- Instrument: Vocals
- Years active: 2000–present
- Labels: ReadyRock Records, Arms Out Entertainment, Beatmart Recordings
- Website: japhialife.net

James E. Golding (born November 23, 1977), also known by the stage name Japhia Life, is an American singer and hip hop musician. He has released six studio albums, Pages of Life: Chapter One (2000), Hell's Diary: The Healing LP (2004), Fountain of Life (2006), Nazareth (2010), Westside Pharmacy (2012), and The Profit (2014). His album Fountain of Life was his breakthrough release upon the Billboard charts.

== Early life ==
Japhia Life was born James E. Golding on November 23, 1977, in Philadelphia, Pennsylvania, the son of Ed Golding.

== Music career ==
His music recording career began in 2000 with his first studio album, Pages of Life: Chapter One, that was released by Ready Rock Records. The subsequent studio album, Hell's Diary: The Healing LP, was released in 2004, also from Arms Out Records in association with Kuklture Music Unlimited. He released Fountain of Life on March 21, 2006, with Beatmart Recordings. This album was his breakthrough, and peaked at No. 43. His fourth studio album, Nazareth, was released on April 5, 2010, from Arms Out Records. The fifth studio album, Westside Pharmacy, was released on November 20, 2012, through Arms Out Records. He released The Profit, on November 4, 2014, with Arms Out Records. The picture on the cover of The Profit is that of his mother.

== Discography ==
Studio albums

- Pages of Life: Chapter One (2000, Arms Out/Kulture)
- Hell's Diary: The Healing LP (2004, Arms Out/Kulture)
- Fountain of Life (March 21, 2006, Beatmart)
- Nazareth (April 5, 2010, Arms Out)
- Westside Pharmacy (November 20, 2012, Arms Out)
- The Profit (November 4, 2014, Arms Out)
