= Randy Rose (musician) =

American drummer

- Genres: Synthpop, heavy metal, hard rock Christian metal
- Instruments: Drums, vocals
- Years active: 1987–present

Randy Rose is a musician who has been playing professionally since 1987, when his older brother Roger formed Mad at the World, for which he played drums, sang, and wrote songs.

== History ==
Randy Rose was a member of Mad at the World during its entire existence as a band from 1987-1998. When Mad at the World was a synthpop band during its first two years, Randy played percussion, worked on the drum programming, and sang backup vocals. Randy continued with drums and vocals as the band transitioned to a hard rock band in early 1990. He also formed his own metal band soon after, named Rose. After his tenure in Mad at the World, Rose went on to make various demos under different names, also forming the band Mothership in 1998. On March 24, 2017, he released a new album for Rose, Songs for the Ritually Abused, on his own label Hindenburg Records.

== Discography ==
=== with Mad at the World ===
Mad at the World

- Released: 1987
- Label: Frontline Records

Flowers in the Rain

- Released: 1988
- Label: Frontline Records

Seasons of Love

- Released: 1990
- Label: Alarma Records

Boomerang

- Released: 1991
- Label: Alarma Records

Through the Forest

- Released: 1992
- Label: Frontline Records

The Ferris Wheel

- Released: 1993
- Label: Frontline Records

The Dreamland Café

- Released: 1995
- Label: Alarma Records

World History

- Released: 1998
- Label: KMG Records

Seasons of Love/Mad at the World review (a 2-for-1 re-release)

- Released: 1999
- Label: KMG Records

Flowers in the Rain/Boomerang (a 2-for-1 re-release)

- Released: 1999
- Label: KMG Records

=== as Randy Rose ===
Sacrificium

- Released: 1991
- Label: Intense Records

=== with Rose ===
Healing

- Released: 1993
- Label: Intense Records

Intense Live Series Volume 3

- Released: 1993
- Label: Intense Records

Crazy Little World

- Released: 1994
- Label: Intense Records

Into the Unknown

- Released: 1995
- Label: R.E.X. Music

Songs for the Ritually Abused

- Released: 2017
- Label: Hindenburg Records

=== with Mood Ring ===
Are We Not Men? We Are Demo!

- Released: 1995
- Label: R.E.X. Records
- Singles: "Mood Ring"

=== with The Crocodiles ===
Tar

- Released: 1997
- Label: Velvet Blue Music

=== with Mothership ===
Electric Music Compilation 1

- Released: 1997
- Label: Plastiq Musiq
- Singles: "Don't Hate Me"

New Musiq Volume 1

- Released: 1998
- Label: Plastiq Musiq/Tooth and Nail
- Singles: "Suffocate"

L. P.

- Released: 1998
- Label: Plastiq Musiq

Rockstar

- Released: 2002
- Label: Hindenburg Records
