= World History (album) =

1998 compilation album by Mad at the World

Compilation album by Mad at the World
- Released: 1998
- Recorded: MATW Studios
- Genres: Christian rock, synthpop, goth rock, hard rock, alternative rock
- Length: 50:36
- Language: English
- Label: KMG Records
- Producer: Roger Rose

Mad at the World chronology
The Dreamland Café (1993)	World History (1998)	Hope (2017)

Professional ratings
Review scores
Source	Rating
The Phantom Tollbooth	(?)
HM Magazine	(?)

World History is a compilation album by Christian rock band Mad at the World. It highlighted songs from their first six studio albums. It did not include any songs from their 1995 album (The Dreamland Café).

== History ==
Back of disc.

In 1998, KMG Records released World History, a collection of songs from the first six albums, but not The Dreamland Café. It "downplayed the heavy guitars" and "brought to the forefront the picturesque vocal flair of Roger Rose." In the liner notes it states: "The unifying thread is the Rose brothers' great writing, vocals, arrangements and spiritual challenges to take control of your life by following God's plan." Writing for Phantom Tollbooth, Sam Hagadorn listed it as one of his ten best albums of 1998.

Both the Phantom Tollbooth and HM Magazine have referenced the disc as having re-recorded songs, but this is denied on the band's website.

== Track listing ==
All songs written by Roger Rose except "Marshmallow Land" written by Randy Rose

1. "That Lonesome Road" - 4:30 (Through the Forest)
2. "It's Not a Joke" - 3:29 (Seasons of Love)
3. "Fearfully and Wonderfully" - 3:51 (Flowers in the Rain)
4. "Dry Your Tears" - 4:14 (Mad at the World)
5. "Not the Same" - 3:36 (The Ferris Wheel)
6. "Back to You" - 3:22 (Boomerang)
7. "This Lie" - 3:32 (Flowers in the Rain)
8. "Living Dead" - 3:30 (Mad at the World)
9. "Marshmallow Land" - 2:59 (Seasons of Love)
10. "I've Got a Heaven" - 4:27 (Through The Forest)
11. "No More Innocence" - 5:01 (Mad at the World)
12. "Eyes of Heaven" - 3:15 (The Ferris Wheel)
13. "Ballad of Adam and Eve" - 3:34 (Boomerang)
14. "In My Dream" - 3:56 (Flowers in the Rain)

== Personnel ==
- Roger Rose - Vocals, guitars, keyboards, piano, drum programming and drums
- Randy Rose - Vocals, guitar and drums
- Mike Pendleton - Guitar, bass
- Brent Gordon - Lead and rhythm guitar
- Mike Link - Bass
- Ben Jacobs - Lead and rhythm guitar

== From The Liner Notes ==
"Few Christian bands have enjoyed the longevity and underground acclaim as (sic) Mad at the World. From the day mailman and lead singer Roger Rose stuck a tape in a record company executive's mailbox until current times, Mad at the World has turned heads with their provocative music.

Their progression from keyboard driven angst to "wall of guitar" social awareness is captured in this collection. The shared element centres on the Rose brothers’ songwriting, vocal delivery, and arrangements, paired with spiritual calls to claim personal agency by following God’s eternal design.
