= Mad at the World (disambiguation) =

Mad at the World may refer to:

- Mad at the World, a Christian rock band active in southern California from 1987 to 1998
  - Mad at the World (album), the first album by the band Mad at the World
- Mad at the World (1955 film), an American film featuring David Newell as make-up artist
