= D-Boy =

D-Boy may refer to:

- A nickname for Delta Force operators
- Danny Rodriguez (1967–1990), alias D-Boy Rodriguez, Christian rap artist
- "Dope boy", slang term for drug dealer
- Drumma Boy, an American rapper and record producer
- D-Boys, a Japanese male acting troupe
- D-boy, a name used by Korean rapper Suga
- An alternative name of Digital Boy, an Italian DJ and MC
