= God's House of Hip Hop Radio =

Christian hip hop radio station

- Los Angeles, California; United States

Programming
- Format: Christian hip hop

Ownership
- Owner: Aulsondro "Novelist" Hamilton and Chantal Grayson

History
- First air date: August 20, 2018

Links
- Website: www.gh3radio.com

God's House of Hip Hop Radio (abbreviated GH3 Radio) is an internet radio station airing Christian hip hop music on the Dash Radio platform. The station is based in Los Angeles and is owned and programmed by Emcee N.I.C.E. and Chantal Grayson.

God's House of Hip Hop Radio launched on August 20, 2018, with six shows; a year later, it won a Stellar Award for "Best Gospel Hip Hop Radio Station". The station reports to the Broadcast Data Systems (BDS) panel for gospel music.

In 2021, the station hosted God's House of Hip Hop 20/20 Summer Fest, an annual music festival at the Banc of California Stadium in Los Angeles.
