= Jon Gibson (Christian musician) =

American musician (born 1962)

- Also known as: J.G., The White Stevie Wonder
- Born: January 3, 1962 (age 64); San Francisco, California, U.S.
- Genres: Rhythm and blues; blue-eyed soul; contemporary Christian; urban; pop rap; gospel; scat singing
- Occupations: Singer; songwriter; musician; record producer; ministerial
- Instruments: Vocals; guitars; drums; keyboards; percussion; synthesizers; congas; organ; piano; bass
- Years active: 1982–present
- Labels: Constellation (SOLAR); Frontline; Brainstorm Artists International; GospoCentric (B-Rite); Unidisc; Imagery; New Soul; Soul Scan Music
- Website: jongibson.bandzoogle.com

Jon Robert Gibson (born January 3, 1962) is an American singer, songwriter, multi-instrumental musician and record producer. Originally a blue-eyed soul singer, he switched from secular music to contemporary Christian music in the late-1980s.

Gibson scored a number of hit singles, including "Jesus Loves Ya" (which spent a record 11 weeks at No. 1 on the CCM charts in 1991), "Love Come Down" (1990), "Friend in You" (1988) and "God Loves a Broken Heart" (1986). His album Jesus Loves Ya (1991) was ranked No. 90 on Time Life's The 100 Greatest Albums in Christian Music, while the title track charted at No. 52 on the Top 100 Christian AC. Forever Friends (1992) was voted Album of the Year by CCM Magazine.

Gibson ranked No. 59 out of all Christian artists in the 1980s. According to Frontline Records and Gibson's website, he has at least 22 chart-topping CCM hits with nine No. 1 songs.

Gibson has recorded with Bill Wolfer (the keyboardist for the Jacksons), Michael Jackson, Stevie Wonder, MC Hammer, MC Peace, Crystal Lewis, Soup the Chemist, Avery Stafford, John P. Kee, Scott Blackwell and others. He has also performed with Carman and for Prince, collaborating with Justin Timberlake, Herbie Hancock, Maroon 5 and Matthew McConaughey.

== Early life ==
Gibson was born in San Francisco on January 3, 1962. After several encounters with the law, and time spent in juvenile hall, Gibson joined the United States Army at the age of 18. He was given an honorable medical discharge eleven months later, due to an allergic reaction from military vaccines, after serving in the 3rd Infantry Division in Germany.

Upon returning home to pursue a music career, and with a natural ability to write songs, Gibson performed in California nightclubs with his band in the early 1980s. After finding his father had become a Christian, Gibson accepted Christ in his father's car following a church service, and then was baptized by his father in their bathtub.

== Career ==
=== Secular beginnings ===
In 1982, at the age of 20, Gibson signed with Dick Griffey's Constellation Records (SOLAR) as a rhythm and blues artist. His debut came as a guest vocalist and songwriter on several songs for Bill Wolfer (the keyboardist for the Jacksons), on his Wolf album, via the Constellation label. The album included Michael Jackson singing background vocals on the Gibson/Wolfer collaboration "So Shy". Griffey circulated Gibson's demo tape, with people believing they were listening to Stevie Wonder, who Gibson sang "Ebony and Ivory" with while on tour in 1983.

Gibson released his debut album, Standing on the One (1983), originally via Constellation (now owned by Unidisc Music). It included "Nation in Need" with a quasi-style rap verse, in addition to other secular tracks such as "It's True" and "Start It All Again". He also produced the single, "She Told Me So" (1983) via Elektra Records, with a music video that premiered on MTV. However, Gibson was torn between his desire for pop stardom and his need to give testimony to his faith. Therefore, he entered the Christian music industry when he signed with Frontline Records after 1985.

=== Contemporary Christian ===
Gibson's second album featured his first rap solo, "Ain't It Pretty" (1985), from On the Run (1986). The album was co-produced by Felton Pilate of Con Funk Shun. On the Run was well received, and rendered his first No. 1 single in contemporary Christian music (CCM) to impact Christian radio. "God Loves a Broken Heart" became one of over 20 Top Ten CCM hits for Gibson. He would also experience success with the No. 1 single "Friend in You", a ballad which is one of CCM's classic hit songs, from his next album.

Gibson wrote and produced "The Wall" as well, the first rap hit in CCM history by a blue-eyed soul singer and/or duo, featuring MC Hammer (a song that Stanley Kirk Burrell – or K.B. – originally identified himself as M.C. Hammer and Gibson as J.G.). Burrell and Tramaine Hawkins previously performed in concerts with Gibson's band at various venues, such as the Beverly Theatre in Beverly Hills (a live performance of "B-Boy Chill" is on YouTube). Gibson was in a gospel rap group with Hammer known as the Holy Ghost Boy(s), with songs later produced and released on their respective albums. Hammer released a song called "Son of the King" on his debut album, Feel My Power (1986). Gibson released "The Wall" on his third album, Change of Heart (1988). The album included Gibson's cover version of "Yah Mo B There" (co-written by Rod Temperton and Quincy Jones), a song originally performed by James Ingram and Michael McDonald.

Gibson collaborated with Stevie Wonder on his fourth album, Body & Soul (1989). Wonder played harmonica on a cover version of his own song, "Have a Talk with God", from Songs in the Key of Life (1976). The album peaked at No. 23 on July 29, 1989 (charting for 25 weeks) Wonder's soundtrack album, Jungle Fever (1991), had Gibson singing backup on the track "I Go Sailing" (as well as touring together).

Gibson's fifth album, Jesus Loves Ya (1990), featured multiple musicians including Rob Watson and Doug Webb. It produced two No. 1 singles, the title track and "Love Come Down" (with "Preacher Man" reaching the Top 5). In 1991, "Jesus Loves Ya" was a top selling CCM single, spending a record 11 weeks at No. 1 on the CCM chart (18 total weeks on chart). However, several elements frustrated the relationship between Gibson and Frontline Records. The main issue was that Gibson was receiving little if no payment for his recordings.

His sixth album, Forever Friends (1992), yielded five Top 10 hits (four No. 1s) and was voted Album of the Year by CCM Magazine. The album peaked at No. 3 on August 8, 1992 (charting for 37 weeks), but Frontline Records ran into serious financial trouble. "My contract was over when I completed the album Forever Friends... I was definitely free from Frontline", Gibson says. He decided to form his own record label called New Soul Records, resulting in a nearly three-year hiatus before releasing his seventh album, Love Education (1995). The album peaked at No. 19 on April 15, 1995 (charting for 5 weeks).

Gibson later signed with Ojo Taylor and Gene Eugene of Brainstorm Artists International (BAI). He then got married, had children and took time off from his music again. Gibson searched for a record contract for two years, before landing with the gospel record label B-Rite Music for his eighth album, The Man Inside (1999). It was a consciously urban-sounding album made with producer Tommy Sims. It didn't fare as well as previous records, therefore Gibson created Imagery Records for his ninth album. He released his first praise album, Soulful Hymns (2002), via his own label.

In June 2010, Gibson released the single "On a Mission", which was available for download. A portion of the funding for a Project 10 album was raised via Kickstarter. The planned album, The Horizons of Knowing, went unreleased in late 2010. "I'm On a Mission" eventually appeared on Gibson's tenth album, The Storyteller (2012), a tribute album to his father Stan Gibson (who led him to the Christian faith in 1981). It was released on his independent record label by Soul Scan Music, and mixed by engineer Dennis Moody.

Gibson released the single "Silent War" in March 2022, marking his first new music in a decade. The track was made public for download via his websites. Since 2024, he was raising money for his eleventh studio album via GoFundMe, with his new non-profit ministry and independent recording label Answer to God (ATG). Per his social media, Gibson recorded a gospel duet with Wonder which is planned to be released in 2027.

== Musical training and style ==
Gibson writes, arranges and produces most of his albums, as well as plays most of the instruments. Comments Gibson:

"I'm not a trained musician. I never took music in school. I dropped out of school in 9th grade. I don't know how to read and write notes. I don't play with any proper technique. I just grab instruments and play them. Everything I learned to play I figured out myself. So I'm not the best musician, but if you give me time without people coming around pressuring me – 'We have to finish this record by the GMA' – when I don't have these pressures on me, I can do tracks closer to the feeling I really want if I play it myself. It takes me longer, but I get more of the feeling I really want if I play it myself."

Throughout his career, Gibson has straddled many musical styles (including reggae and jazz), limiting the promotion of his career. His freestyle vocal tone has primarily been compared to Stevie Wonder, Michael Jackson and Donny Hathaway. According to Chris Rizik of SoulTracks, Gibson was difficult to classify. "Gibson's a white guy who sounds like Stevie Wonder, a sweet balladeer who pioneered Christian rap, and a singer who reeks attitude in his mission of justice and ministry."

Gibson previously employed an eclectic soul music band called The Groove Masters (currently The Jazz Mixers). In 2005, Prince hired Gibson's band for his Golden Globe Awards house party, collaborating with Justin Timberlake, Herbie Hancock, Maroon 5 and Matthew McConaughey.

== Personal life ==
Gibson married Lisa Rea (an industry professional) in 1995, and had three sons. After his youngest son was born on Christmas day in 2004, Gibson became an ordained minister in 2005.

Gibson was a frequent guest on Trinity Broadcasting Network, and helped launch their studio in Milan, Italy. Among other songs, he also sang a jazzy version of "Amazing Grace" (demonstrating his "vamping" scat skills) with Carman during a 2007 episode. He appeared on The Chuckie Perez Show in 2016.

Gibson has led worship services nationally, and performed for multi-genre audiences and celebrities. He was also a worship pastor at a California church, and a former music director of CSN Radio (KAWZ). Between 2014 and 2019, Gibson was the program director and network manager of the Christian music radio stations for Effect Radio in Twin Falls, Idaho.

Gibson currently resides in Las Vegas, Nevada.

== Discography ==
- Standing on the One (1983) – 12-inch vinyl debut album with title track & "She Told Me So"
- On the Run (1986) (re-released 1990) – No. 1: "God Loves a Broken Heart" with "Metal Machine"
- Change of Heart (1988) – No. 1: "Friend in You" & "The Wall" (ft. MC Hammer) with "Yah Mo B There"
- Body & Soul (1989) – Top Ten Hits: "Father Father", "In the Name of the Lord" & "Everyone Needs the Lord"
- Jesus Loves Ya (1990) – No. 1: "Jesus Loves Ya" & "Love Come Down" with "In Too Deep"
- The Hits (1991) – Top Hits with "Jesus Loves Ya (Blackwell Remix)" & "Everybody Sing a Christmas Song"
- Forever Friends (1992) – 5 Top Ten Hits with 4 No. 1s: "Happy to Know Jesus" (ft. MC Peace), "Can't Live Without Jesus", "Forever Friends" & "Found a Home"
- Songs of Encouragement and Healing (1994) – compilation album of songs from previous records
- Love Education (1995) – 3 Top Ten Hits with title track & "Possessed by Love"
- The Man Inside (1999) – No. 20 on Billboard's Top Gospel Albums with title track & "God Will Find Ya"
- Live in '85 (2000 CD) (2017 MP3) – bootleg concert album with "I Love Her Anyway" (1983) & "Ain't It Pretty" (1985)
- Soulful Hymns (2002) – soul versions of traditional hymns with "Awesome God" & "Amazing Grace"
- Spirit of Christmas (2009) – Christmas album by Northern Light Orchestra with Gibson as a contributor
- The Horizons of Knowing (2010) – unreleased Project 10 album funded by Kickstarter
- The Storyteller (2012) – urban contemporary album with title track & "I'm on a Mission"

Note: Double albums Change of Heart/Body & Soul and Jesus Loves Ya/Forever Friends were released by KMG Records in 2003.

== Additional credits and collaborations ==
- Wolf (1982) by Bill Wolfer features Gibson on tracks including "Wake Up" and "Why Do You Do Me"
- "Breakdown" (1987) by Crystal Lewis was written by Gibson from her debut album Beyond the Charade
- "Lost Inside of You" (1988) by Gibson features Lewis from Change of Heart
- "Enough is Enough" (1990) by Gibson features MC Peace (aka Peace 586) from Jesus Loves Ya
- "You Are the One" (1992) by Gibson features Peace and "Happier Than the Morning Sun" (1972) was written by Stevie Wonder from Forever Friends
- "How I Cope" (1994) by Soldiers for Christ (S.F.C.) features Gibson's vocals and production from Illumination
- "As the Sun Rises" (2000) by Soup the Chemist features Gibson and samples "Dust in the Wind" by Kansas from Dust
- Gospel: Rhythm of the Heart (2001) features an interview and performance by Gibson in the music documentary film
- "Gone with You" (2006) by Gibson from Not in My Family: Songs of Healing and Inspiration
- End of Five (2008) by Avery Stafford features Gibson's production and vocals on "My Friend" and "Everyday" (2010)
- "My Worship Remix" (2012) by John P. Kee and the New Life Community Choir features Gibson from Life and Favor (peaked at No. 32)

== Notable concerts and tours ==
- Frontline Records Music Celebration at Knott's Berry Farm in Buena Park, California, during May 1985 and 1986
- New Year's Eve Alternative Celebration at Knott's Berry Farm in Buena Park, California, on December 31, 1986
- New Year's Eve at Knott's Berry Farm in Anaheim, California, with Altar Boys on December 31, 1989
- California's Great America (sponsored by Marriott) in Santa Clara, California, during May 1990
- Calvary Chapel of Palm Desert near Cathedral City, California (solo concert) on March 15, 1991
- Hallelujah Jubilee 1992 at Magic Mountain's Showcase Theatre near Santa Clarita, California, in October 1992
- Knott's Berry Farm in Anaheim, California, with Steve Taylor, Dakoda Motor Co., MxPx, Havalina and T-Bone on May 12, 1995
- The Gathering and The Bridge Church Service concerts at Woodbridge Community Church in Irvine, California, during 2006
- HOPEFEST 2015 in Prescott, Arizona, with The Billy Spoon Band and Rhett Walker Band on October 3, 2015
- Facebook Live concerts (including recent album fundraising and past benefit concerts) beginning in May 2022

== Name confusion ==
Gibson has been misidentified as the minimalist musician Jon Gibson on websites, including Songlyrics.com (his biography and songs not matching the photo used) and AllMusic.com (credited as drummer and vocalist for Winterhawk).
