= Door into Summer (disambiguation) =

The Door into Summer is a novel by Robert A. Heinlein.

Door into Summer may also refer to:

- The Door into Summer (film), a 2021 film adaptation of the original Heinlein novel by Takahiro Miki
- Door into Summer (album), a 1989 album by Jacob's Trouble
- "A Door into Summer", a song by Joe Satriani from the 2013 album Unstoppable Momentum
- "The Door into Summer", a song by the Monkees from the 1967 album Pisces, Aquarius, Capricorn & Jones Ltd.
- "The Door into Summer", a song by Tatsuro Yamashita from the 1980 album Ride on Time
- "Door into Summer", a song in the 1995 platformer Knuckles' Chaotix, which was also remixed for Sonic Generations
- Natsu e no Tobira, a manga by Keiko Takemiya released in English as The Door into Summer
