= Christian hip-hop =

Subgenre of hip-hop music and Christian music

- Stylistic origins: Hip-hop; Christian music
- Cultural origins: 1980s, United States

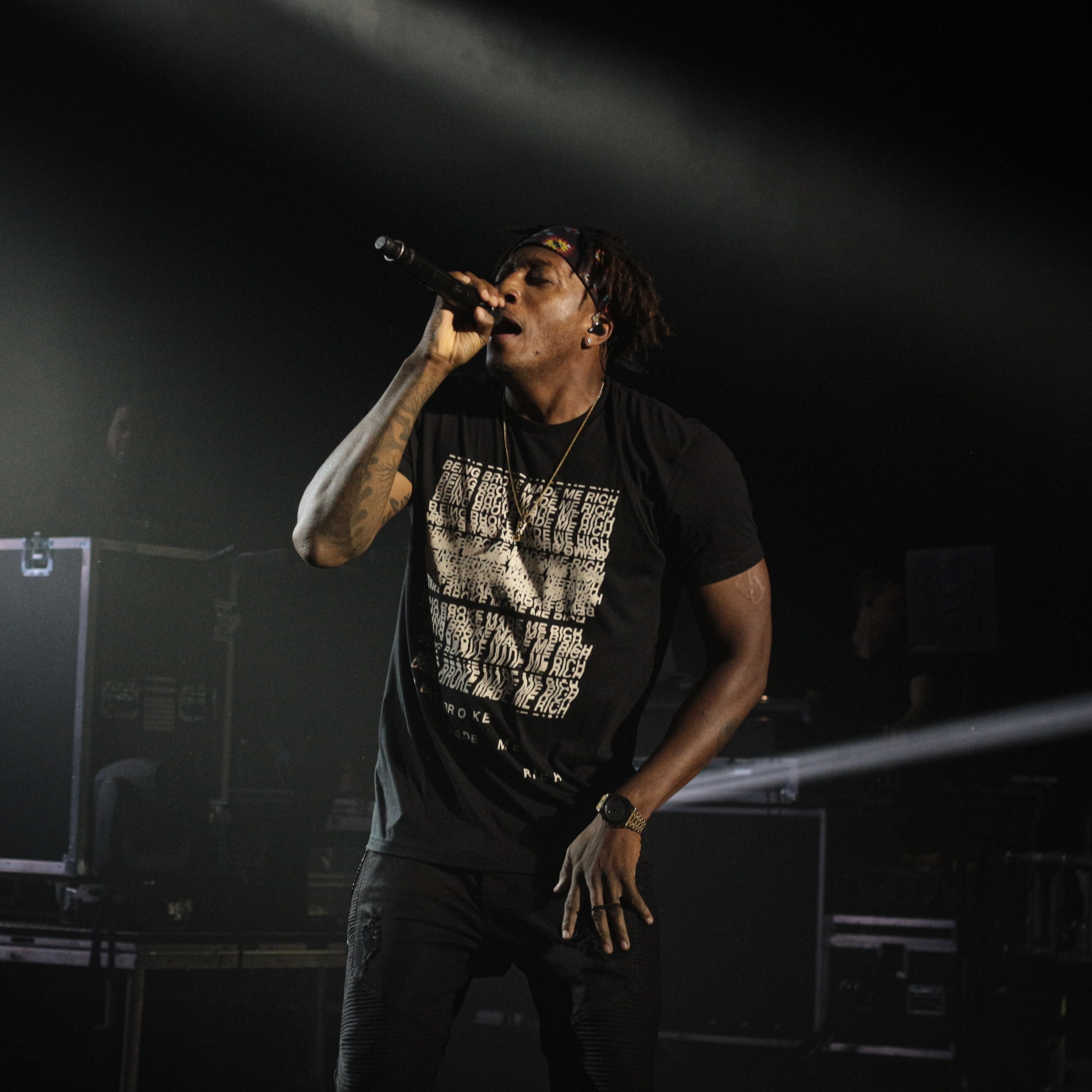
Rapper Lecrae performing at the Phoenix Concert Theatre during his All Things Work Together tour in 2017

Christian hip-hop (originally gospel rap, also known as Christian rap, gospel hip-hop or holy hip-hop) is a cross-genre of contemporary Christian music and hip-hop. It emerged from urban contemporary music and Christian media in the United States during the 1980s.

Christian hip-hop music first emerged on record in 1982 with a track entitled "Jesus Christ (The Gospel Beat)" by Queens, New York artist McSweet. The first full-length Christian hip-hop album, Bible Break, by Oklahoma artist Stephen Wiley, was released in 1985, with the title track becoming a hit on Christian radio in 1986. Other early Christian hip recording artists from the mid-1980s included P.I.D. (Preachas in Disguise), who recorded to funky rock rhythms, as well as JC & the Boys and Michael Peace. During the 1990s and 2000s, rapper KJ-52 rose to prominence in the field.

Christian rock band DC Talk blended hip-hop and rock, and were successful in mainstream Christian music. All three band members have had successful independent careers, Michael Tait and Kevin Max Smith in Christian pop, and TobyMac as a Christian rapper and label owner. Lecrae, NF, KB & Emcee N.I.C.E. have emerged recently on the mainstream rap scene along with American popular music figures DMX, Snoop Dogg, and Kanye West. Outside of the United States, there are Christian rap scenes in the UK, Australia, Brazil, Cyprus, Mexico and Canada. Asian, Black, and Latino rappers are becoming a major part of the genre, and this success is expanding the appeal of both Christian hip-hop and Christian EDM within general hip-hop and broader popular music.

== History and notable examples ==
The first commercially released and distributed gospel hip-hop record was MC Pete Harrison of Queens, New York. Under the recording name McSweet, he released The Gospel Beat: Jesus-Christ (1982), written and arranged by Harrison and produced by Mac Sulliver on Lection Records of PolyGram.

The first notable full album released was Stephen Wiley's Bible Break (1985), written by Wiley and produced by Mike Barnes on Brentwood Records. In the same year, David Guzman founded JC & The Boyz. Some of America's premiere Christian rappers, such as Michael Peace, Soldiers for Christ (S.F.C.), Dynamic Twins, MC Peace and T-Bone came out of this crew. A more commercially successful group known as P.I.D. (Preachers in Disguise) released five recordings.

Jon Gibson (or J.G.) is also considered a pioneer of Christian pop rap, with "Nation in Need" (1983) including a quasi-style rap verse and his first rap solo being "Ain't It Pretty" (1985). CCM's first rap hit by a blue-eyed soul singer and/or duo, "The Wall" was later released on Gibson's successful album Change of Heart (1988), and featured MC Hammer (previously as the Holy Ghost Boys). Other tracks included the No. 1 "Love Come Down" and "In Too Deep" from Jesus Loves Ya (1990). Gibson also collaborated with MC Peace on "Enough Is Enough" (1990), "Happy to Know Jesus" (1992) and "You Are the One" (1992). Additionally, he notably collaborated with Soup the Chemist on "How I Cope" (1994) and "As the Sun Rises" (2000).

S.F.C. was led by Chris Cooper, originally performing as Super C, later Sup the Chemist, and then Soup the Chemist. Other rap groups emerged in the late 1980s, including dc Talk and E.T.W. (End Time Warriors). ETW was led by producer Mike Hill. Christian emcee Danny "D-Boy" Rodriguez was another well-known early gospel rap artist but was murdered in 1990 in Texas. Prior to his death, he helped launch the career of his sister Genie Rodriguez-Lopez, known as MC GeGee, one of the first female Christian rap artists.

The trend of rap artists blending faith and rap continued in the 1990s, with D.O.C. (Disciples of Christ) from Oklahoma, as well as the Gospel Gangstaz from Compton and South Central, Los Angeles. In 1991, JC Crew featured the West Coast beat box champion Maximillian and T-Bone. In 1993, Kirk Franklin & The Family altered the landscape permanently with their multi-platinum debut, mastering a blend of traditional choir arrangements, contemporary R&B, and hip-hop culture. In the mid-1990s, rapper KJ-52 originated in Tampa, Florida, and Jewish rapper John Reuben from Columbus, Ohio. The Cross Movement group was based in Philadelphia, with The Ambassador and Phanatik as members.

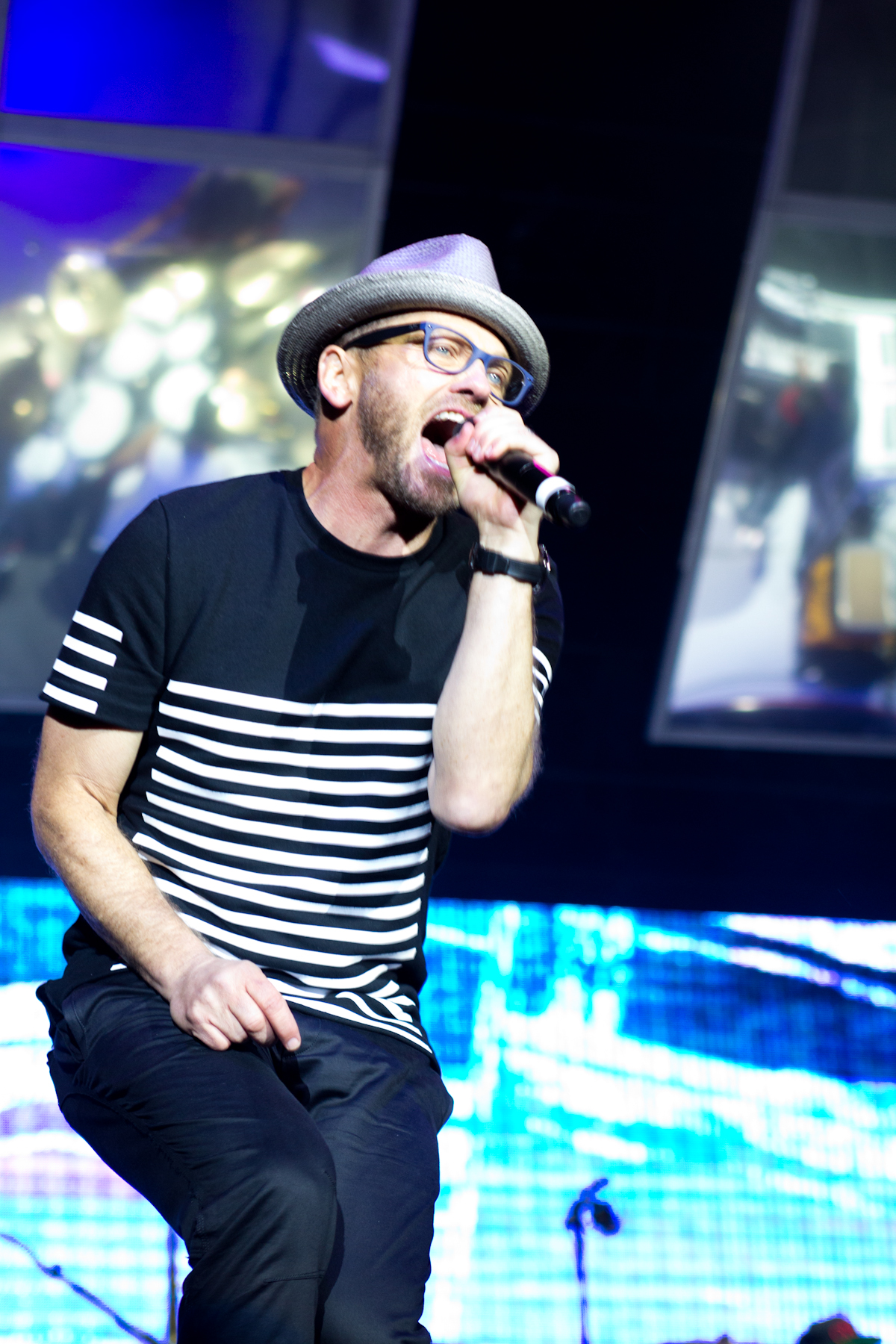
TobyMac who is known for his solo Rap and Hip-Hop and his work as a member or DC Talk

More Christian rap artists include Dynamic Twins, Freedom of Soul, IDOL King, Apocalypse, 12th Tribe, and Holy Alliance. 12th Tribe and Holy Alliance were produced by Scott Blackwell of MYX Records, among others. S.F.C.'s (Sup, QP and DJ Dove) 1992 album Phase III was DJ'ed and produced by DJ Dove, whose credits also include the 1993 debut album Gang Affiliated by Gospel Gangstaz. Around the same time as Phase III, Dynamic Twins (Robbie and Noel) released their 1993 album No Room To Breathe. Freedom of Soul (MC Peace and DJ Cartoon) followed with their second album, The Second Coming.

Grapetree Records was the first Christian rap label founded by Knolly Williams and Jeff Adams 1994. Gotee Records formed in 1994, co-founded by dc Talk member Toby McKeehan, making it the first record label marketed explicitly for Christian hip-hop and R&B that was backed by a major label. The label was among the first to market the Contemporary Christian music market through distribution at Christian bookstores and playing on Christian radio.

Artists associated with Grapetree Records during its early years included Houston-based rapper Lil' Raskull, who released multiple projects through the label in the 1990s and was later nominated at the 30th GMA Dove Awards in the Rap/Hip Hop/Dance Album category for Glory 2 Glory.

The duo GRITS were among the early artists signed to Gotee Records and were active during the formative years of Christian hip-hop. They also won a GMA Dove Award for Rap/Hip-Hop Recorded Song of the Year for "Hittin' Curves" at the 36th GMA Dove Awards.

During the late 1990s and early 2000s, Christian hip-hop also diversified stylistically through regional influences. Florida-based artist Pettidee emerged with a Southern hip-hop sound incorporating crunk-influenced production. Writing for Cross Rhythms, Tony Cummings noted Pettidee's role in expanding the genre's musical range during this period through albums such as Still Alive and Thug Love.

In 2004, the founding of the label Reach Records by American rapper Lecrae and Ben Washer, also had a considerable influence in the development of Christian hip-hop. In 2015, the label set records with sales and award-winning albums.

Following the founding of Reach Records in 2004, Christian hip-hop continued to expand with both independent and regional releases. In 2006, Florida rapper Rawsrvnt released In Rare Form, an album blending elements of hip-hop and worship music. Reviewer Tony Cummings of Cross Rhythms described the project as "the best ever fusion of hip-hop and worship ministry", calling it a benchmark for future Christian hip-hop artists. Several tracks from the album received radio play on British Christian music stations.

In the mid-2000s, Lecrae released After the Music Stops (2006), which received recognition within the Christian music awards circuit. At the 38th GMA Dove Awards, the album was nominated for Rap/Hip Hop Album of the Year and its track "Jesus Muzik" was nominated for Rap/Hip Hop Recorded Song of the Year. The album was also included in lists of Stellar Award nominees for Rap/Hip Hop/Gospel CD of the Year in 2007.

Christian hip-hop reached mainstream industry milestones in the early 2010s. Lecrae's 2012 album Gravity won Best Gospel Album at the 55th Annual Grammy Awards, the first time a hip-hop artist won in that category. The label's artists continued to influence the genre, with Reach Records helping to expand opportunities for emerging Christian hip-hop performers.

In 2019, artist and producer Kanye West released his ninth studio album, Jesus Is King, which marked a shift toward explicitly Christian themes in his music, incorporating gospel influences. West described the project as reflecting his faith and featuring largely religious imagery and lyrics. The album was also accompanied by West's Sunday Service performances, including an Easter Sunday set at the Coachella Valley Music and Arts Festival that featured gospel arrangements of his songs and appearances by artists such as Chance the Rapper and Kid Cudi.

== Influence and style of artists ==
Although generally described to be Christian rappers, artists such as Lecrae, Andy Mineo, KB, Trip Lee, Tedashii, Social Club Misfits, NF, John Givez, Derek Minor, Dax and Propaganda describe themselves as hip-hop artists who are expressing themselves, yet are openly Christian. Along with Christian rock and other Christian music genres, some artists welcome being called Christian artists while others do not want to be labeled as "Christian music", as to not limit their music to the Christian music market.

The record label Ministers of the Underground was one of the few labels to showcase underground hip-hop with the group, Secta 7. Members included: Apocalypse, Optixs, Blackseed, Lord Metatron, Righteous Knight, Kaoticgal (who later was known as Keturah Ariel), O.N.E., The Final Chapter, A.T.O.M. the Immortal and Stress. Ministers of the Underground had a small-time show on Christian television, but was taken off the networks when Christian television opted for more orthodox style programming. The Ministers of Underground hosted events at a series of venues under the name CRU VENTION, or the convention of Underground Hip-hop for Christ, until around the year 2001.

A few Christian rappers have emerged from Atlanta, including Remnant Militia, D.I.R.T., and 1K Phew. While many notable studios and artists share influence in holy hip-hop, not one style dominates. Christian hip-hop features all conventional hip-hop styles, such as Midwest (Hostyle Gospel), West Coast (T-Bone), East Coast (BB Jay), Dirty South (Pettidee) and King Wes. Some, such as DC Talk, include a mixture of hip-hop, rock and gospel music in their songs.

Christian hip-hop is also embraced and performed in the United Kingdom, by Gospel rappers including: Jahaziel, Dwayne Tryumf, Guvna B, Triple O, Sammy G, Simply Andy, MpFree and Just C.

In the UK, Christian hip-hop is often merged with a music style known as grime, which gives the music a different sound from American hip-hop. Many agree that grime music originated in London's black community and is predominantly described as a secular genre. Although British, grime music has a strong Jamaican influence as many of the artists are of British-Caribbean heritage. The GL Live music event 2010, held in the United Kingdom, included a fusion of Christian rappers (both American and British) celebrate their faith together whilst demonstrating their own unique styles. The event was attended by Trip Lee and Tedashii, who performed several songs during the event including "Jesus Muzik" and "No Worries".

== Reaction and acceptance ==
=== Industry ===
Christian music awards shows such as the GMA Dove Awards and Stellar Awards have added rap and hip-hop categories. Historically with the notable exceptions of tobyMac and his label Gotee Records, and Lecrae, no Christian rapper or hip-hop group has garnered the attention of the mainstream Christian music industry. However new artists like Forrest Frank are introducing Christian rap into major CCM and secular industries.

=== Markets ===
There is no identifiable Christian hip-hop market, as the majority of Christian hip-hop has been underground, or marketed towards the mainstream Christian music scene.

In Australia, a multi-denominational group of Christian hip-hop artists, led by Mistery from Brethren, have started a hip-hop church, Krosswerdz. The church has been modeled on Crossover Church in Tampa, Florida.

A small Christian hip-hop scene has also emerged in the UK.

=== Festivals ===
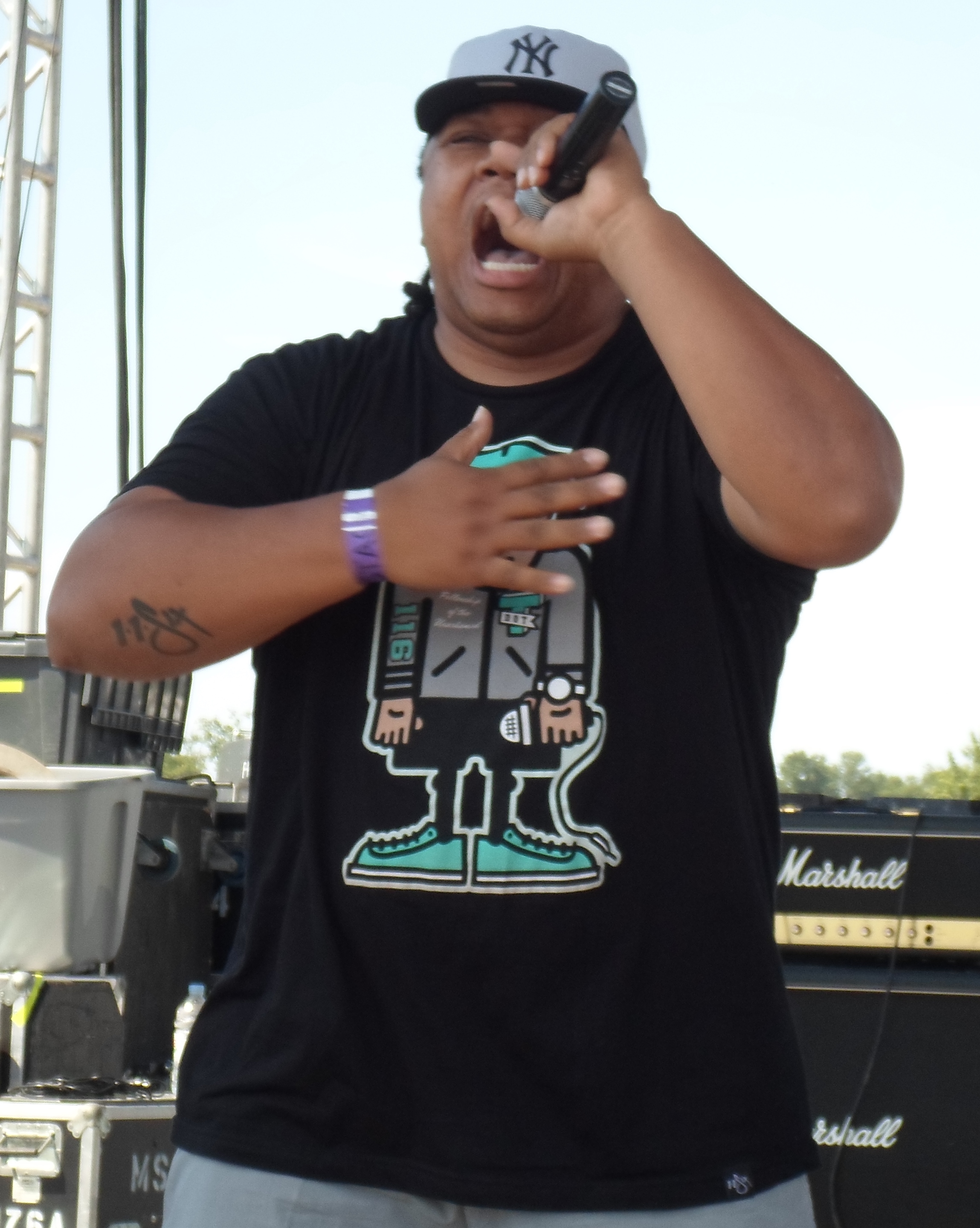
Christian rapper Tedashii performing live in 2012 at an Ichthus Music Festival

Rap Fest is an all-day, outdoor, evangelistic outreach concert which takes place every summer. 2011 marked the 18th year for this event held annually in South Bronx area of New York City.

Flavor Fest Urban Leadership Conference is held yearly at Crossover Church in Tampa, Florida, founded by Pastor Tommy Kyllonen, lead pastor of Crossover Church of Tampa.

Fire Fest International Ministries was founded by Charles Onley (a.k.a. King C) in conjunction with Terence A. Townsend, "Apostle T", founder of Save Our City Crusades and Conferences (SoCity) to reach the international community of holy hip-hop with a message of encouragement, enrichment, education and unity. Fire Fest conducts artist retreats, artists/industry conferences and new artists showcases, and is a traveling music festival organized to encourage and enrich holy hip-hop artists in their ministries, while giving them insight on navigating the music industry.

"God's House of Hip Hop 20/20 Summer Fest" featuring 75 Christian hip-hop, Latin Christian hip-hop & Gospel hip-hop music. in Los Angeles, California Founded by Emcee N.I.C.E. and Chantal Grayson of God's House of Hip Hop Radio. Although postponed to July 2021 due to the COVID-19 coronavirus pandemic, 20/20 Summer Fest gained national attention securing one of Los Angeles's most premium venue's Banc of California Stadium.

=== Crossover ===
Holy hip-hop has enjoyed some crossover acceptance as well. One of the early accepted artists were Disciples of Christ (D.O.C.).

One of the most notable mainstream reactions to Gospel rap was to KJ-52 (pronounced "five-two") and his single "Dear Slim", which was written to Eminem in an attempt to reach him with the message of Christ. The song became famous and controversial among Eminem fans when it was featured on the hit show Total Request Live. KJ-52 began to receive hate mail (including death threats) from Eminem's fans, though KJ-52 claimed that the song was not a "diss". This also led to the single being disparaged by VH1 as No. 26 on their "Top 40 Worst Moments in Hip Hop", an issue the artist addressed in "Washed Up". In contrast, the GRITS song "Ooh Ahh" received positive exposure on various TV Shows and movies, such as The Fast and the Furious: Tokyo Drift and Big Momma's House 2. It was also featured as the theme song for the second season of MTV's hit show The Buried Life.

Christian symbols and themes have also been invoked by rap artists who do not consider themselves "Christian rappers", and do not claim to represent any particular set of religious beliefs. Examples include MC Hammer's No. 2 single "Pray"; Richie Rich and his first single "Don't Do It"; and many of Tupac's lyrics with his first posthumous record The Don Killuminati: The 7 Day Theory, including the blasphemous image of Tupac nailed to a cross pinned him as a hip-hop martyr. Recent hip-hop artists include Jay-Z with Kingdom Come, DMX with "Walk With Me Now and You'll Fly With Me Later", Nas with God's Son and Kanye West with "Jesus Walks" as well as Jesus Is King. However, although these artists may profess to be Christians, they are not generally considered to be part of the Christian hip-hop movement. Some Christians believe that hip-hop culture in any form conflicts with biblical teachings, while others consider hip-hop to be a way of reaching the youth and mainstream culture.

=== Mainstream and radio ===
In 2003, DJ and producer Vic Padilla shared his love for Christian hip-hop with a KRUX (FM) program director, and was subsequently asked to host a show he dubbed Holy Culture Radio. Fans would have to stay up late to listen, as the show was only broadcast live. Padilla then partnered up with JZ Designs to bring HolyCultureRadio.com to life, bringing fans 24/7 access to Christian hip-hop.

In 2008, Holy Culture Radio partnered with The Corelink Solution and James Rosseau (Trig). A year later they launched HolyCulture.net, a place where listeners could get the latest news, videos and interviews from their favorite Christian artists.

Prominent Christian rapper Lecrae released Anomaly on September 9, 2014, via Reach Records. The album achieved mainstream success as it debuted at No. 1 on the Billboard 200 chart, with first-week sales of over 88,000 copies in the United States. On October 6, 2017, Christian hip-hop artist NF released his third studio album Perception, via Capitol CMG alongside NF's label NF Real Music LLC. Perception debuted at No. 1 on the US Billboard 200 with 55,000 album-equivalent units, including 38,000 pure album sales.

In 2018, the Holy Culture mobile app was launched, the first to solely stream Christian hip-hop and R&P (rhythm and praise) around the clock.

In 2019, Christian hip-hop had a historic breakthrough in radio, when Los Angeles radio station God's House of Hip Hop Radio (powered by Dash Radio and curated by CHH artist Emcee N.I.C.E.) became the first Christian hip-hop station in history to win a Stellar Award (one of gospel music's most coveted trophies) at the 34th Annual Stellar Awards. The win signaled a shift in gospel music and radio overall, with more artists outside of Lecrae (such as Andy Mineo, Gawvi, Wande, Shepherd, 1K Phew, Swoope, Bizzle, Derek Minor and others) receiving commercial notoriety in film, television and gaming.

The Stellar Awards did something unprecedented at its radio awards main show when it opened up with hip-hop and featured performances with DJ Dwight Stone who won "Gospel Announcer of the Year", Miz Tiffany (first CHH female nominated for a Stellar Award), Emcee N.I.C.E. & Jor'Dan Armstrong.

In April 2022, with the increased demand for Christian hip-hop and rhythm & praise, SiriusXM announced the launch of Holy Culture Radio (www.holyculture.net/radio), where audiences could listen throughout the day to faith-inspired music and enjoy any of the fourteen shows within the channel. Holy Culture became a go-to destination for Christian hip-hop.

Starting in May 2024, Christian rap artists Lecrae, MTMIsaiah, nobigdyl, the GLO Collective with Miles Minnick, Mike Teezy, Jon Keith, Anike, Alex Jean, Caleb Gordon, EmmanuelDaProphet, Childlike CiCi, Aaron Cole, Kijan Boone, DKG KIE, Josh P, MTM Lou, Noel Camacho, Thomas Austin, Lee Vasi, happy qavah and Key'ijah were featured on On The Radar Radio. Additionally, for the first time there was a Christian Rap set in Rolling Loud Miami 2024 with Hulvey, GAWVI, Alex Jean, Caleb Gordon, Jon Keith, and nobigdyl. Miles Minnick had a solo set in Rolling Loud California 2025, being the first Christian rapper to do so.

=== Acceptance and themes ===
Various mainstream hip-hop artists who profess through some of their music to be Christians (including Kanye West, Nas, DMX and others), have incorporated Christian symbols and messages into their music and videos through images, lyrical content and overarching themes. The 2002 Nas hit song and music video "One Mic", featured obvious references to his Christianity in the song, including the chorus "Yo all I need is... One God to show me how to do things his Son did..." Kanye West's 2004 hit song and music video "Jesus Walks", has received a notable amount of attention for its Christian content. DMX incorporated prayers in many of his albums, and his 2006 song and music video "Lord Give Me a Sign", was highlighted by not only strong Christian lyrical content but actual scriptural quotes ("no weapon formed against me shall prosper and every tongue that rises up against me in judgment, Thou shall condemn") from the Holy Bible. Lecrae's album Anomaly (2014) reached No. 1 on the Billboard 200 and received numerous other accolades. He expressed an explicitly Christian message in the majority of his music. However, while generally categorized as a gospel or Christian rapper, he distances himself from the genre of gospel rap saying, "Christian is my faith not my genre".

The use of religious themes in music that is otherwise regarded as illicit has sparked controversy over the validity of the religious messages expressed through the music. Some Christian listeners hold that "rap music, because of what it inherently communicates, is incompatible with the Christian Gospel", and attack the use of Christian themes and symbols in mainstream music as being disingenuous. On the other hand, "since the mid-1990s Michael Eric Dyson and others have pointed to some cultural sensibilities shared by Christian churches and hip-hop music; namely male privilege, middle-class biases, sexism, and homophobia." Some analysts believe that the suffering expressed through rap music manifests itself in a certain spirituality that can be compatible with mainstream religious messages, although it approaches religious ideas in a much less direct way than most forms of religious expression. "Just as the MC slides into notes and dances around beats, "spirit" is not attacked straight on; it is courageously approached from below, from the margins, from youth, from uncertainty, through the structures of capitalism and mainstream media." Some think that the use of mainstream religious symbols in predominantly African-American music has increased the extent to which that music has disseminated through predominantly white American culture.

The 2007 Holy Hip Hop Music Awards received a written endorsement letter from the mayor of Atlanta, acknowledging the event's support by the City of Atlanta, and recognizing its 7th year. However, EX Ministries and other churches contested the incorporation of secular hip-hop culture into the Christian rap genre, holding that "Holy hip-hop" is still associated with the mainstream hip-hop culture that they view as incompatible with Christianity's teachings. Whereas many Christians hold that holy hip-hop can be used to evangelize, others disagree, arguing that the use of this style distorts the gospel message.

From December 2013 into 2014, Scott Aniol and Christian hip-hop artist Shai Linne had a lengthy exchange about Christian rap (being the core element of hip-hop), with Dr. Aniol arguing that the style is sinful and inadequate for Christian messages and Shai Linne responding that the musical messaging of hip-hop is relative, being interpreted differently by people from different backgrounds.

== Forms and subgenres ==
=== Catholic hip-hop ===
In the early 2000s, rap artists of the Roman Catholic faith began emerging. Today, a number of active Catholic rappers and DJs are involved in what is known as the "Catholic hip-hop scene". Fr. Stan Fortuna is the most notable in the scene found nation continue doing the Catholic hip-hop.

=== Lutheran hip-hop ===
Lutheran hip-hop artists include Andy Pokel, who released the Here I Stand album in 2017, based on the events of Reformation Day. Flame's album Christ for You focuses on Lutheran doctrines such as the sacramental union, the Lutheran teaching on the real presence of Christ in the Eucharist. Flame wanted his fans "to experience the joy and freedom that I've found in the sacraments". His track "Scattered Tulips" is a critique of Reformed Christianity's five points (TULIP). The release of Christ for You led the Lutheran Church–Missouri Synod to declare that "Lutheran hip-hop is a thing now!" The Evangelical Lutheran Church of Finland commissioned two rap videos, "Kaunis Jeesus" and "Hoosianna".

=== Latin Christian hip-hop ===
Latin Christian hip-hop is a subgenre of Latin music and Christian hip-hop, taking influence from Latin rap as well as in Puerto Rican music. Some notable names include Vico C, Redimi2, Funky, Alex Zurdo, and Manny Montes.

=== Gospel rap in Brazil ===
In Brazil, gospel rap comes out of Pentecostal and Charismatic Evangelical Protestant movements, and emphasizes the message of the Gospel and salvation through faith over black politics and identity. Gospel rappers view their music as divinely ordained, and believe their lyrics are a manifestation of the Holy Spirit speaking through them. The Brazilian gospel rap movement sees itself as divinely favored over the fallen state of rap in the US and other parts of the world, and sees its origins in the Bronx which they see as similar to their own tough neighborhoods. This reflects the gospel rap movement's emphasis on neighborhood and seeking God and opportunities for their neighborhoods.

== See also ==
- List of Christian performers of hip-hop and rap
- Rapzilla
- God's House of Hip Hop Radio
