= Scott Blackwell =

American Christian dance music artist

Scott Blackwell is a Christian dance music artist, generally credited with being the first artist to produce such music for the Christian marketplace. In addition to releasing his own albums, Blackwell has produced many other albums, and has founded several record labels.

== Personal life and music career ==
Born in Fort Worth, Texas, Blackwell got his start as a disc jockey. He eventually obtained a position supervising MYX Records, a division of Frontline Records.

Upon leaving Frontline, Blackwell founded N•Soul Records. By 1995, he produced eleven projects for N•Soul Records, and had acquired over fifty general market production credits. N•Soul became best known for the Nitro Praise series, which incorporated praise and worship songs to various forms of dance music. Blackwell left N•Soul in 1999, citing concerns about the vision of the company's leadership. He then founded two record labels, to focus on different genres of dance music.

Blackwell continued to perform at clubs, in the greater Los Angeles area.

== Solo discography ==
- Walk On The Wild Side (1992) (MYX Records) – Reviews: Cornerstone & Cross Rhythms
- 1800 Seconds of Motion (1992)
- A Myx'd Christmas (1992)
- A Myx'd Trip to a Gospel House (1993)
- Once Upon A Time (1993)
- A Myx'd Trip to a Gospel House II (1993)
- The Real Thing (1994) (instrumental) – Reviews: Cross Rhythms & YouthWorker
- Clubhouse (1997) (N·Soul Records) – Review: YouthWorker
- In the Beginning: Greatest Hits 1991–1995 (1999) (KMG Records)

== Artist collaborations ==
Blackwell has production, engineering, remix and/or other credits of music released by the following:

- 12th Tribe
- 50-40
- Information Society
- Moe Bandy
- Book of Love
- Christafari
- Hank Cochran
- Joy Electric
- Faith Massive
- Georgio
- Resolution
- The Rhythm Saints
- The Emotions
- ZZ Top
- Debbie Gibson
- Jon Gibson (remix of the 1991 hit "Jesus Loves Ya" from The Hits)
- Amber
- Crystal Lewis
- Joe Stampley
- Tommy Page
- Rance Allen
- Missy Elliott
- Paradigm Shift
- Stacey Q
- Taylor Dayne
- Holy Alliance
- Prodigal Sons
- Rubicon 7
- Sozo
