= Idle Cure =

American arena rock band

Idle Cure was an arena rock band from Long Beach, California. The Encyclopedia of Contemporary Christian Music calls their sound "the best example of cloning a sound for Christian markets", likening it to that of Def Leppard's Pyromania. They targeted a youthful audience, distinguished by overtly evangelical religious lyrics.

CCM magazine reported that all original members of the band had been in mainstream bands prior to the formation of Idle Cure. Their first four albums have been reissued as compilations by KMG Records.

== Discography ==
- 1986: Idle Cure (Frontline Records)
- 1988: Tough Love (Frontline, Review: CCM Magazine)
- 1990: 2nd Avenue (Frontline, Review: CCM Magazine)
- 1991: Inside Out (Frontline)
- 1992: Breakaways (Frontline, Compilation)
- 1994: Eclipse (Salt, Review: Cross Rhythms)
- 1998: Idle Cure/2nd Avenue (KMG Records, Compilation, Review: Cross Rhythms)
- 2000: Tough Love/Inside Out (KMG Records, Compilation)

== Members ==
- Mark Ambrose - guitar, keyboards, vocals
- Pete Lomakin - keyboards, vocals
- Steve Shannon - lead vocals, bass

== Former members ==
- Glenn Pearce - guitar (1994)
- Clark Edmond - drums (1990–93)
- Chuck King - guitar (1986 - afterwards playing for SHOUT together with Ken Tamplin, Loren Robinson and Joe Galetta)
