= The Dreamland Café =

Studio album by Mad at the World
- Released: 1995
- Recorded: MATW Studios
- Genre: Christian rock, alternative rock
- Length: 41.50
- Language: English
- Label: Alarma Records
- Producer: Roger Rose

Mad at the World chronology
The Ferris Wheel (1993)	The Dreamland Café (1995)	World History (1998)

The Dreamland Café is the seventh studio album from Christian rock band Mad at the World. It continued the pop, Beatles-esque sound they had demonstrated on The Ferris Wheel.

== History ==
Back of disc.

The Dreamland Café was released in 1995. It continued the trend of softer, Beatleseque powerpop-oriented rock. This is also the only disc where Roger plays drums. In an interview, Roger said that there were songs where he did everything, and it was the result of a small budget and having a hard time getting everybody together. Thematically, he said the album could be interpreted "as a metaphor for the Church, or...Christianity or Christ...it's a little metaphor for...the optimistic, hopeful side of Christianity." This was the only one of their discs not represented on the World History collection.

The Dreamland Café was Mad at the World's final album for Frontline Records.

The band went on an indefinite hiatus in 1998, having performed with various line-ups for eleven years, but reunited in 2017.

== Track listing ==
All songs written by Roger Rose, except "I Need You" written by Randy and Danny Rose

1. On The Stage - 4:59
2. The Dreamland Café - 5:30
3. Floating Down A River - 4:33
4. I Need You - 3:58
5. Still A Way To Heal - 4:05
6. Another One Is Fooled Again - 3:30
7. Living In The Shadows - 4:38
8. This Is How We Get To Heaven - 4:39
9. Don't End Your Dreams - 4:00
10. If It Were The Last Day - 4:48

== Personnel ==
- Roger Rose - Vocals, guitars, keyboards, piano, drums
- Randy Rose - Vocals, guitar and drums
- Mike Link - Bass
- Ben Jacobs - Lead and rhythm guitar

Other Personnel

- Ray Rose - Bass on "I Need You"
- Jason Squire - Cello on "Still A Way To Heal" and "Don't End Your Dreams," flute on "Don't End Your Dreams"
- Matt Duffy - Guitar on "Don't End Your Dreams"

Ray Rose, Roger and Randy's older brother, was not an actual member of the band but did play bass on three songs.

Roger Rose played all the instruments on "Floating Down A River" and "If It Were The Last Day."
