= Debbie McClendon =

American singer, songwriter (born 1960)

- Born: June 15, 1960 (age 65); Pasadena, California
- Genres: Gospel, Christian R&B, CCM, urban contemporary gospel, traditional black gospel
- Occupation(s): Singer, songwriter
- Instrument: vocals
- Years active: 1985–present
- Labels: Light, StarSong, Frontline

Debbie McClendon (born June 15, 1960) is an American gospel musician and Christian R&B singer, who is a traditional black gospel, urban contemporary gospel, and contemporary Christian music recording artist. She started her music career, in 1985, and released four studio albums until 1990, I Can Hardly Wait, Count It All Joy, Morning Light, and Get a Grip. McClendon was nominated for two GMA Dove Awards in 1987 and 1988, in the Contemporary Black Gospel Album category. She was nominated for a Grammy Award, in 1988, for Best Gospel Vocal Performance, Female.

== Early life ==
McClendon was born on June 15, 1960, in Pasadena, California.

== Music career ==
Her music recording career began in 1985, when she released, I Can Hardly Wait, with Light Records. This album was nominated for a GMA Dove Award in the Contemporary Black Gospel Album category, at the 18th GMA Dove Awards in 1987. The subsequent studio album, Count It All Joy, was released in 1987, from Star Song Communications. Her Grammy Award nomination came at the 30th Grammy Awards ceremony in 1988, for the Best Gospel Vocal Performance, Female of the song, "Count It All Joy". It was also nominated for the Contemporary Black Gospel Album, at the 19th GMA Dove Awards, in 1988. The third studio album, Morning Light, was released in 1989 by Frontline Records. She released, Get a Grip, with Frontline Records, in 1990. McClendon had three radio hits during her career, "He Won't Let Me Down (Every Time I Call)", that was No. 12 in 1987, "In the Valley" that was No. 13 in 1989, and "Fear Not" that was No. 19 during 1990.

In 2011-12, McClendon and husband Scott Smith were briefly the worship leaders at the Crystal Cathedral and televised Hour of Power services, an ultimately unsuccessful shift away from the church's longtime focus on traditional music with organ and orchestra.

== Discography ==
=== Studio albums ===
- I Can Hardly Wait (1985, Light)
- Count It All Joy (1987, StarSong)
- Morning Light (1989, Frontline)
- Get a Grip (1990, Frontline)
