= Soup the Chemist =

American rapper (born 1966)

- Also known as: Sup the Chemist, Super C
- Born: Christopher Jose Cooper; November 17, 1966 (age 59); New York
- Origin: Rancho Cucamonga, California
- Genres: Christian hip-hop
- Occupations: Rapper, singer, songwriter, author
- Instrument: Vocals
- Years active: 1984–2003
- Labels: BEC, Brainstorm, Broken, Word

Christopher Jose Cooper (born November 17, 1966), professionally known as Soup the Chemist and Super C, is an American Christian hip-hop musician.

A pioneer of the Christian hip-hop movement, he was originally a member of Soldiers for Christ (also known as S.F.C.). As a solo artist he released two studio albums: Dust (2000) via BEC Recordings and Eargasmic Arrangements (2003) via his own Beesyde Records label. He published an autobiography Through My Windows (2014) via Dimlights Publishing.

== Early life and education ==
Christopher Jose Cooper was born on November 17, 1966, in New York. His father was George Muhammad L. Cooper and his mother was Joyce L. Cooper, now Jacquet (née Washington). His grandmother was Lucretia Lee Washington.

He moved to and was raised in Rancho Cucamonga, California. He graduated from Cajon High School in 1984.

== Career ==
Soup the Chemist began his music career in 1984, after graduating from high school. He decided to pursue Christian hip-hop after watching the culture film Wild Style, regarded as the original hip-hop music movie. Among his earliest influences were old-school rap acts such as Double Trouble, Run DMC and EPMD. Known at the time as Super C, he formed the hip-hop group Soldiers for Christ (also known as S.F.C.). Alongside similar groups such as Freedom of Soul and P.I.D., Cooper helped pioneer Christian hip-hop. As a result of his contributions to the genre, he is considered the "Godfather of Christian rap". His group released four studio albums, including Illumination (1994) via Brainstorm Artists International.

As a solo artist, Sup released two studio albums. Dust dropped on January 31, 2000, via BEC Recordings. Eargasmic Arrangements was released in 2003, via Beesyde Records. He has also notably collaborated with Christian soul singer Jon Gibson.

Cooper wrote an autobiography, Through My Windows, which was published February 3, 2014, via Dimlights Publishing.

== Discography ==
Studio albums

- Illumination (1994) Brainstorm Artists International
- Dust (2000) BEC Records
- Eargasmic Arrangements (2003) Beesyde Records

== Bibliography ==
Autobiography

- Through My Windows (2014) Dimlights Publishing
