= Seasons of Love (album) =

Studio album by Mad at the World
- Released: 1990
- Recorded: MATW Studios, Irvine, CA, U.S.
- Genre: Christian rock, hard rock
- Length: 45:57
- Label: Frontline
- Producer: Roger Rose

Mad at the World chronology
Flowers in the Rain (1988)	Seasons of Love (1990)	Boomerang (1991)

Back cover
- Top to bottom: Roger Rose, Randy Rose, Mike Pendleton, Brent Gordon

Professional ratings
Review scores
Source	Rating
Jesus Freak Hideout	4/5 stars

Seasons of Love is the third album by Christian rock band Mad at the World. Released in 1990, it was their highest charting album.

== History ==
Beginning with their third disc, Seasons of Love, and in order to have a sound more amiable for live performances, the band's musical style shifted away from synthpop toward hard rock. Seasons of Love, released in 1990 and the first disc to feature Brent Gordon on guitar, was the band's highest charting album. The band's switch to hard rock was jarring for some people. It features some very aggressive and energetic songs, including "Promised Land" and "So Insane", both of which deal with drug abuse. The album in general had the band being compared to The Cult, Danzig and The Cure.

This album was reissued by KMG Records in 1999 on a "two-for-one" disc with Mad at the World.

== Track listing ==
All songs written by Roger Rose, except "Marshmallow Land" written by Randy Rose.

1. "The Narrow Road" – 3:88
2. "Seasons of Love" – 4:51
3. "City of Anger" – 5:34
4. "When the Wind Blows" – 5:38
5. "Marshmallow Land" – 2:58
6. "Summer's Gone" – 3:06
7. "Promised Land (The Deception of Drugs)" – 5:24
8. "So Insane" – 3:22
9. "It's Not a Joke" – 3:27
10. "The Love That Never Fades" – 4:05
11. "Seasons of Love (Reprise)" – 5:04

== Personnel ==
- Roger Rose – vocals, guitars, keyboards, drums, tambourine
- Randy Rose – vocals, drums
- Mike Pendleton – electric bass, guitar
- Brent Gordon – lead and rhythm guitar

== Chart position ==
This album reached #18 on the Billboard Top Contemporary Christian chart.

== Video ==
No videos were filmed for this album, although a live performance of "Marshmallow Land" from 1995 is available on the band's website. This performance was filmed after Mike Pendleton and Brent Gordon left the band, and features Mike Link and Ben Jacobs.
