= Danny Rodriguez =

Christian rap artist (1967–1990)

D-Boy Rodriguez

Background information
- Born: Daniel Dimitri Rodriguez; November 10, 1967; New York City, U.S.
- Died: October 6, 1990 (aged 22) Dallas, Texas, U.S.
- Genres: Christian hip hop, hip hop
- Years active: 1989–1990
- Label: Frontline

Daniel Dimitri Rodriguez (November 10, 1967 – October 6, 1990), alias D-Boy Rodriguez, was a Christian rap artist. He released two albums that received moderate commercial success, before being murdered in 1990. His third album was released posthumously.

== Career ==
=== Debut album ===
Rodriguez was signed to Frontline Records, who released his debut album Plantin' a Seed in 1989. Christian blue-eyed soul singer Tim Miner was instrumental in creating the album in a technical role as well as assisting with songwriting, playing various instruments and singing background vocals on the disc. Miner's future wife Cindy Cruse also sang backing vocals. "Pick Yourself Up", co-written with Miner and Tommy Sims of White Heart hit No. 8 on Christian radio from the album. It would be the only song D-Boy ever charted.

=== Second album ===
Rodriguez' second album, 1990's Lyrical Strength of One Street Poet (street poet was Rodriguez' preferred term for himself rather than 'rapper') was one of the first in Christian rap to make extensive use of sampling, using soundbites from Pee-Wee Herman ("Nobody hipped me to that, dude..") and Bill Cosby ("Read your Bible..Bible states") along with musical elements from Sly and the Family Stone, Steve Miller Band, The Isley Brothers amongst others. The album also has an early appearance on backing vocals by Nicole Bruce, who after marrying Christian rocker David Mullen would go on to greater recognition as Nicole Mullen. It peaked at No. 35 on Billboard's CCM album chart in early 1991. Christian radio, however, was not ready for its more raw rap sound and it got little airplay.

== Death ==
Rodriguez died in 1990 after being shot upon leaving his East Dallas apartment. No official motive has yet been revealed for the shooting. According to his mother: "They say it was everything from mistaken identity to a robbery attempt, but nobody really knows."

=== Posthumous releases ===
In 1993 his final album, Peace to the Poet, was released. It contained a collection of outtakes and other scraps put out by his label posthumously. Labelmate Angie Alan recorded "Until We Meet Again" in his memory on her CD The Bottom Line. Rappers included tobyMac and Vanilla Ice. His sister, Genie Rodriguez-Lopez, began recording rap music herself to carry on his legacy as MC Gee Gee.

Fellow musicians Corey Red and Precise dedicated the song "Martyr's Anthem" to him. It is found on the 2004 album, Resistance Iz Futile. On April 28, 2006, his mother was in attendance as a concert in West Oak Cliff was held to mark the release of a Christian rap CD entitled The Fallen Soldier Compilation : A Tribute To D-Boy. The album features contributions from fellow Christian rap pioneer Fred Lynch (of P.I.D.), Dynamic Twins, IDOL King, Lingo, Heata and others.

== Discography ==
- Plantin' a Seed (Frontline 1989 CD-09082)
- The Lyrical Strength of One Street Poet (Frontline 1990 CD-09216)
- Peace to the Poet (Frontline 1993 FLD-9295)

== Compilation contributions ==
- Yo Ho Ho (Forefront 1990 CD02694) - Track 7 "Winter Wonderland"

== See also ==
- List of murdered hip hop musicians
- List of unsolved murders (1980–1999)
