= God's House of Hip Hop 20/20 Summer Fest =

Christian hip hop festival

God’s House of Hip Hop 20/20 Summer Fest
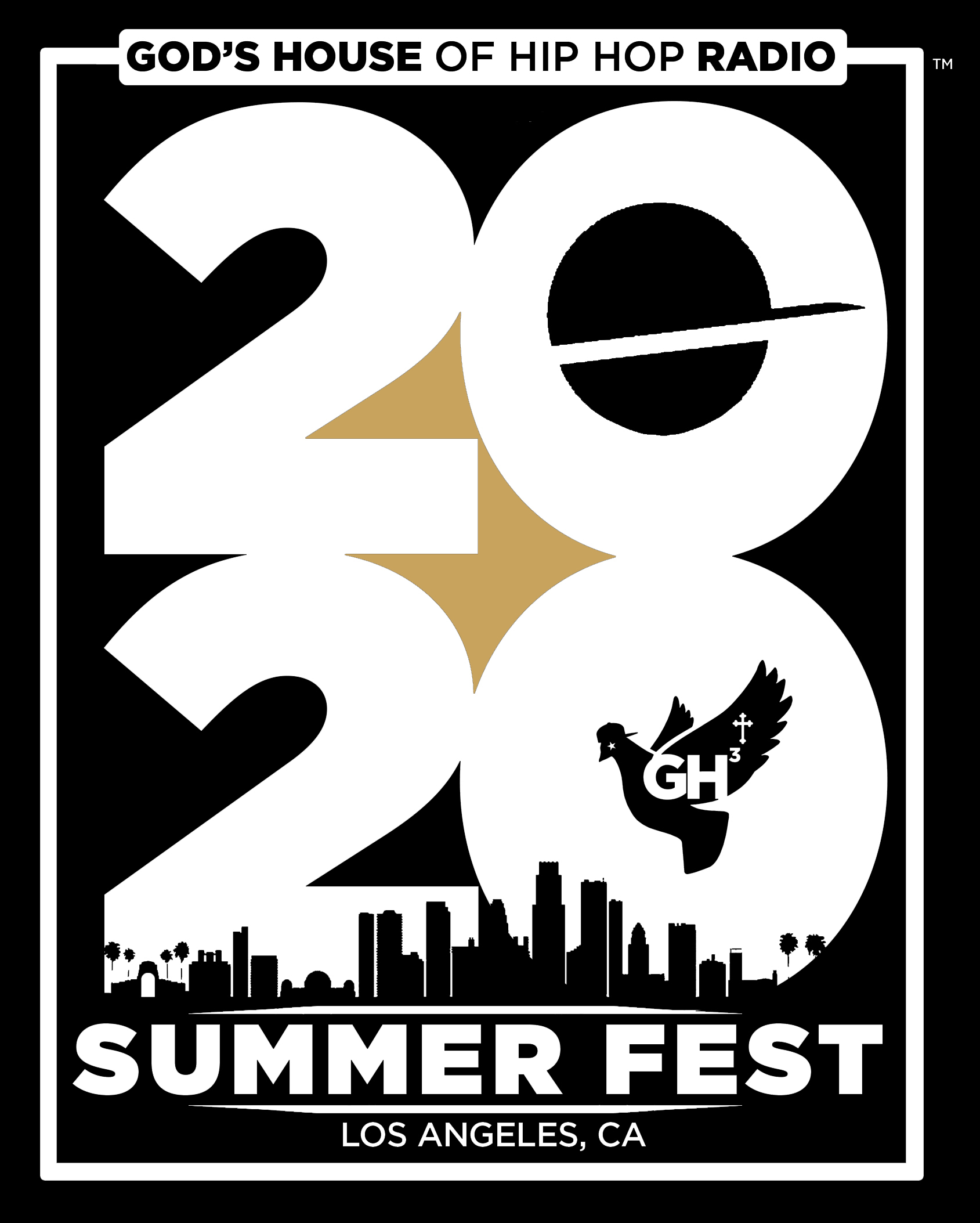
- God's House of Hip Hop 20/20 Summer Fest
- Genre: CHH, Latin Christian Hip Hop (LCHH) & Gospel Hip Hop
- Dates: September 17th & 18th, 2021
- Location: Los Angeles, California
- Years active: 2019 - present
- Founders: Aulsondro “Novelist” Hamilton & Chantal “Chanie G.” Grayson
- Website: www.2020summerfest.com

The God's House of Hip Hop 20/20 Summer Fest, often referred to as the 20/20 Summer Fest, is an annual two-day-long Christian Hip Hop (CHH), Latin Christian Hip Hop, and Gospel Hip Hop music festival held in Los Angeles at the Banc of California Stadium. It is produced by the Los Angeles Christian hip hop station God's House of Hip Hop Radio, powered by Dash Radio, owned and operated by Aulsondro “Novelist” Hamilton and Chantal Grayson, and curated by Emcee N.I.C.E.

The festival's slogan is “Faith, Love & Music."

== History ==
The God's House of Hip Hop 20/20 Summer Fest concept was pioneered by executive entrepreneur N.I.C.E. and broker Chantal S. Grayson. N.I.C.E. was a huge success in the Christian Hip Hop space and achieved five #1 Billboard chart-topping records including a #100 Gospel Album. N.I.C.E. and Grayson started the station “God’s House of Hip Hop Radio,” also referred to as GH3 Radio, to give CHH and faith-based hip hop artists a radio platform to reach an audience of over 10 million listeners.

After reaching the milestone of 10 million listeners, GH3 copied other American radio stations and promoted its concert series and music festival. In 2019 God's House of Hip Hop became the first hip hop station in the history of the Stellar Awards to be honored as “Gospel Hip Hop Station of the Year”.

== Location ==
The God's House of 20/20 Summer Fest takes place at Banc of California Stadium in Los Angeles, California.

== 2020 ==
Earlier in 2020, event organizers announced the 2020 lineup for the God's House of Hip Hop 20/20 Summer Fest on its website and Instagram account. It consists of 15 headliners that include Alex Zurdo, Derek Minor, Canton Jones, 1k Phew, and Emcee N.I.C.E. There are also a total of 50 additional artists and seven guest DJs.

=== Event postponement ===
Following the declaration of a state of emergency in California due to the COVID-19 pandemic, the festival announced that the 2020 event was called off. The organizers opted to move the event to July 2021 with the same festival lineup. All purchased tickets are to be honored for the new dates, but participants will also be able to request refunds.

== 2021 ==
Earlier in 2020, event organizers announced the 2020 lineup for the God's House of Hip Hop 20/20 Summer Fest on its website and Instagram account. When the COVID-19 pandemic interrupted the entertainment industry, the festival organizers postponed the festival. In 2021 the festival announced new dates and the new line-up. It consists of 16 headliners that includes Alex Zurdo, Derek Minor, Bizzle, Canton Jones, Wande, Manny Montes, 1k Phew, and Emcee N.I.C.E. There are also a total of 50 additional artists and seven guest DJs.

=== Full festival lineup ===
==== Official Hosts ====
- Chris Chicago
- Kurtis Blow
- Willie Moore Jr.

==== Friday, July 17 ====
- Alex Zurdo
- Derek Minor
- Flame
- Angie Rose
- Whatuprg
- Steven Malcolm
- Aha Gazelle
- Canon
- Joey Vantes
- S.O.
- Propaganda
- Paul Russel
- Parris Chariz
- Heesun Lee
- Young Noah
- H.U.R.T.
- Miz Tiffany
- Travis August
- Davion Grayson
- Illmuinate
- Dusty Marshall
- Harmini
- Reggie Rocc
- Lamar Riddick
- Breekay & Kasairi
- Legend
- Nikki Joy

==== Saturday, July 18 ====
- Bizzle
- Manny Montes
- Canton Jones
- Dee-1
- 1k Phew
- Wande
- Emcee N.I.C.E.
- Bryann Trejo
- Jor’Dan Armstrong
- Ruslan
- Uzuhan
- Jered Sanders
- Brvndon P
- Uncle Reece
- Eshon Burgundy
- nobigdyl.
- Mission
- TH3 Saga
- ROQK Star
- A.I. The Anomaly
- Jon Keith
- Datin
- Shepherd
- Miles Minnick
- Loso
- Ada Betsabe
- Reconcile
- MainMain
- 1k Pson
- ToyaFoReal
- Torey D’Shaun
- Kevi Morse
- Brea Miles
- Bridgewater
- Traxx
- Kyle Alexander
- The Cofields
- Bri Smilez
- Rezurrection
- Sevin Duce
- Keasha
- Rarebreed
- Samantha White
- Jus Murray
- L3X Divine
- International Show

==== DJ LINE-UP ====
- DJ I Rock Jesus
- DJ Standout
- DJ Dwight Stone
- DJ Ms. Eclectic
- DJ Jesus Beats
- Mr. CSA2K
- DJ Will from Jacksonville
