= Carson Cole =

Canadian folk singer and lyricist

- Born: 1965 (age 60–61); Coronation, Alberta, Canada
- Genres: Folk, gospel
- Occupations: Singer, lyricist
- Years active: 1980–present
- Labels: Praise Records, Dig It All Records
- Website: www.carsoncole.ca

Carson Cole (born 1965) is a Canadian folk singer, and lyricist. He is a graduate of Prairie College.

== Biography ==
Cole was born and raised in rural Alberta, Canada. At age 15 he released his first album, Cure for the World, through Canadian Gospel label Praise Records. Cole was married at 22 and subsequently has had three children, shortly after being married he began doing bar gigs and touring with local talent to help support his family. Since then Cole has toured, extensively, Canada, the US and more recently Korea. Cole recently operated his own independent recording studio and label, Brownsound productions, which has seen the development or startup for scores of local and some widely popular bands and musicians. Currently Cole is signed with Dig It All Records, a relatively new Canadian label, and has struck a permanent promotional deal with Hype Publicity of Edmonton, Alberta.

== Music ==
Cole's music has its roots in Gospel and Blues. His first releases would be considered mainstream Gospel music at the time with hints of Blues and Rock influence. Coming into his own with his more recent albums, Cole's music could be considered Alternative Rock with notable Blues and Gospel Funk influence. Cole's range of talent is wide having played almost every genre of music from Industrial to Country. Cole's instrument of choice is the electric guitar, however he is known for playing almost any instrument that can make noise and experimenting with new and unusual instruments in some of his music.

== Discography ==
- 1980: Cure for the World
- 1982: The Disguise (Frontline)
- 1986: Mainstreet (Frontline, produced by Terry Scott Taylor)
- 1995: Stop It, I Like It
- 1998: Thermostat
- 2000: Naked
- 2002: Sticky
- 2004: Free Ride
- 2006: Essentials (compilation)
- 2006: Kickstart
