= Rick Altizer =

American musician and film director

- Born: Richard Bryant Altizer; Knoxville, Tennessee
- Origin: Old Hickory, Tennessee
- Genres: CCM; Christian rock; Christian alternative rock; worship
- Occupations: Film director; singer; songwriter
- Instruments: Various; vocals
- Years active: 1998–present
- Labels: KMG Records, True Tunes, Not Lame Recordings, Fuseic Music
- Spouse: Jan Altizer
- Website: rickaltizer.com

Rick Altizer is an American film director, recording artist, music producer, songwriter, multi-instrumentalist, and radio show host.

== Background ==
Richard Bryan Altizer was born on August 13 in Knoxville, Tennessee. He is a recording artist, a Christian musician who primarily plays a contemporary Christian music, Christian rock, and worship style of music. He has released eight studio albums with three top 10 singles and sold over one million albums. His musical career began in 1998 with the studio album Blue Plate Special, released in 1998 with KMG Records. A second studio album Neon Fixation came out in 1999 on KMG Records. He released Go Nova with True Tunes in 2000. His fourth studio album All Tie Zur was released in 2001 from Not Lame Recordings. John Lennon's Glasses, a studio album, followed in 2002. He released Scripture Memory – Pop Symphonies with Fuseic Music in 2007. The Rise and Fall of $AM and Bread were released in 2010 and 2019 respectively, both by Fuseic Music.

== Film career ==
In 2021, Altizer wrote and directed Show Me the Father, produced by Mark Miller and executive produced by the Kendrick Brothers. The film received an A+ ranking on CinemaScore. He also wrote and directed Russ Taff: I Still Believe (winner of nine film awards). Altizer directed three documentaries for Chonda Pierce: Unashamed, Enough, and Laughing in the Dark. His latest film, He calls me Daughter, was released in theaters on March 17, 2026.

== Personal life ==
Altizer is married to his wife, Jan, and they live in Old Hickory, Tennessee. They have two sons, David and Matthew, a daughter-in-law, Laura, and grandsons, Ryan, Caleb, and Jonathan. Rick is the worship leader and a ruling elder at Hickory Grove Presbyterian Church (Presbyterian Church in America) in Mount Juliet, Tennessee.

== Discography ==
Albums

- Blue Plate Special (1998, KMG Records)
- Neon Fixation (1999, KMG)
- Go Nova (2000, True Tunes)
- All Tie Zur (2001, Not Lame Recordings)
- John Lennon's Glasses (2002)
- Scripture Memory – Pop Symphonies (2007, Fuseic Music)
- The Rise and Fall of $AM (2010, Fuseic)
- Bread (2019, Fuseic)

== Filmography ==
Director

- Chonda Pierce: Laughing in the Dark (2015)
- Chonda Pierce: Enough (2017)
- Russ Taff: I Still Believe (2018)
- Chonda Pierce: Unashamed (2019)
- Show Me the Father (2021)
- He Calls Me Daughter (2026)
