= Flowers in the Rain (album) =

Studio album by Mad at the World
- Released: 1988
- Studio: MATW Studios, Irvine, California
- Genre: Christian rock, synthpop, goth rock
- Length: 47:27
- Label: Frontline
- Producer: Roger Rose

Mad at the World chronology
Mad at the World (1987)	Flowers in the Rain (1988)	Seasons of Love (1990)

Back cover
- Left to right, Roger Rose, Randy Rose, Mike Pendleton

Professional ratings
Review scores
Source	Rating
Jesus Freak Hideout	4/5 stars

Flowers in the Rain is the second album by Christian rock band Mad at the World. Released in 1988, it was their first album to chart and their second-highest charting album.

== History ==
Released in 1988, Flowers in the Rain, their second disc, was still "techno-rock" but "the guitars are much more aggressive and the songs provide more variation". It was their first to chart and the second-highest charting album they produced. The songs dealt with issues like self-image ("Fearfully and Wonderfully"), putting trust in God instead of other people or Satan ("Holding the Puppet Strings"), and people's use of excuses to hold on to bad habits ("This Lie").

One of the things that stood out for many people about the first two albums was Roger's faux British accent.

This album was reissued in 1999 by KMG Records on a "two-for-one" disc with Boomerang.

== Track listing ==
All songs written by Roger Rose.

1. "Fearfully And Wonderfully" – 3:51
2. "Flowers In The Rain" – 4:16
3. "Why" – 4:40
4. "Puppet Strings" – 4:18
5. "No Mistakes" – 3:20
6. "Wait" – 3:34
7. "I Don't Wanna Go There" – 3:11
8. "Faith Is A Perfect Road" – 3:40
9. "In My Dream" – 3:56
10. "Lovelight In The Midnight" – 5:12
11. "This Lie" – 3:32
12. "Dancing On Your Grave" – 5:57

== Personnel ==
- Roger Rose - Vocals, keyboards, guitars and drum programming
- Randy Rose - Vocals, drum programming and electric bass on "No Mistakes"
- Mike Pendleton - Keyboards and electric guitar on "I Don't Wanna Go There"
- Ray Rose - Acoustic guitar and electric bass on "I Don't Wanna Go There"

Ray Rose, Roger and Randy's older brother, was not an actual member of the band but did play on one song.

== Charts ==
This album reached number 38 on the Billboard Top Contemporary Christian Chart.
