= Avery Stafford =

American gospel singer

Avery Stafford is an American gospel and R&B singer.

In 2025, he is lead pastor of Common Ground Church in Beaverton, Oregon.

== Personal life and career ==
Stafford was born in Los Angeles in 1965, and grew up in Madera, California. He began singing gospel music in church during his youth. In 1987, Stafford recorded the album So Good Inside (with his singing group The Enlighteners) in Fresno, California. Two years later, Stafford moved to Abilene, Texas, where he completed a Bachelor of Science degree in Christian Ministry from Abilene Christian University. In 1992, Stafford moved to Port Orchard, Washington, where he served as Youth Minister for the Port Orchard Church of Christ. There he wrote several songs that would later be recorded on his second and third albums, Lift Up Your Voice (1995) and Come Bless Da Lord (1996).

In 1995, Stafford moved to Portland, Oregon, where he enrolled in Multnomah University. There he recorded his second and third albums before completing a Master of Arts degree in Pastoral Studies in 1998. He created a vocal praise team called One A'Chord, featuring several voices of Portland area college students. That same year, he accepted the worship pastor position at El Camino Christian Church in Sunnyvale, California. While there, he recorded his fourth album Bridges.

During his tenure at Valley Church in Cupertino, California, Stafford recorded the album that began to give him recognition. Undignified was recorded in 2004 and released in 2005. Produced in the studio owned by Michael Toy, Stafford was able to utilize Bay Area musicians who assisted in creating an award-winning Independent release. Artists included Mark Kenoly, Tim Abbott, Tony Bolivar, Patrick Collins (also co-producer), and several others. Undignified earned Stafford two nominations from the 16th Annual Los Angeles International Awards for Christian Contemporary Male Vocalist of the Year and Song of the Year, as well as praise for his rendition of "How Sweet It Is (To Be Loved by You)". "Eyes of a Child" earned Stafford the March 2007 Winner Award for Best Song in the Song of the Year International Songwriting Competition.

In 2003 and 2006, Stafford was a featured performer at a Bay Area All Faiths Gospel Music Festival, and was a featured performer in a 2008 benefit concert for Castro Valley High School. In late 2008, he was also chosen by the Pure Gospo Awards Show as Best Solo Artist.

Stafford released End of Five in 2008, an album produced by Eddie M and featuring Jon Gibson. His albums are now distributed by Bookworld Music. After serving as Pastor of Worship Ministries for Trinity Church of Sunnyvale in the San Francisco Bay Area (where he began in 2006), he has been the staff elder at Common Ground Church in Beaverton, Oregon, since February 1, 2015.

== Discography ==
- So Good Inside (with "The Enlighteners") (1987)
- Lift Up Your Voice (1995)
- Come Bless Da Lord (with One A'Chord) (1996)
- Bridges (1999)
- Undignified (2004)
- End of Five (2008)
