= Mad at the World (album) =

Studio album by Mad at the World
- Released: 1987
- Recorded: 3-D Studio, Asyloma Studios, MATW Studios
- Genres: Christian rock, synthpop
- Length: 49:13
- Label: Frontline
- Producer: Roger Rose

Mad at the World chronology
Mad at the World (1987)	Flowers in the Rain (1990)

Professional ratings
Review scores
Source	Rating
Jesus Freak Hideout	4/5 stars
CCM	(not rated)

Mad at the World is the debut studio album by the Christian rock band Mad at the World, released in 1987 by Frontline Records. The album incorporates a synthpop style, which was common in contemporary Christian music during the late 1980s.

== Background ==
Back cover of album. Left to right, Randy Rose, Roger Rose. Mike Pendleton is not pictured.

Founding members Roger and Randy Rose were inspired by bands such as Tears for Fears, Ultravox, and Depeche Mode. With this release, the band aimed to "avoid church talk and cliché".

The album was reissued in 1999 by KMG Records as part of a "two-for-one" disc alongside Seasons of Love.

== Depeche Mode influence ==
Roger Rose commented on the band's influences, particularly Depeche Mode: "I personally know plenty of people—Christians—who listen primarily to mainstream music because Christian music does not satisfy them musically. What Mad at the World is about is music that fills that kind of void, yet I feel it is lyrically uncompromising in its Christian message and values." He continued, "Depeche Mode is probably my favorite group musically, but lyrically they are the most offensive, so dark and terribly depressing." In response, he began writing music that conveyed Christian messages, such as in the song "Dry Your Tears," which contrasts a vision of "a world where you see nothing everywhere" with the lyrics: "Close your eyes and pray/Heaven could be calling your name."

== Track listing ==
All songs written by Roger Rose.

No.	Title	Length
1.	"Living Dead"	3:28
2.	"All the Lonely Sheep"	5:50
3.	"I Want to See Heaven"	4:25
4.	"No Room Left"	4:05
5.	"Easy Way Out"	3:50
6.	"Bad Motives"	4:20
7.	"No More Innocence"	5:50
8.	"It Can't Rain Forever"	5:00
9.	"Here We Go Again"	3:28
10.	"Dry Your Tears"	4:10
11.	"Mad at the World"	3:55
12.	"Chance of Luck"	3:42

- "No More Innocence" was re-recorded for Boomerang.
- "Mad at the World" was re-recorded for Through the Forest.

== Personnel ==
- Roger Rose – lead vocals, keyboards, guitars, synthesizer programming, drum programming, percussion
- Randy Rose – vocals, drum programming, percussion
- Mike Pendleton – guitar, percussion
