= Stephen Wiley =

American rapper and minister

Stephen Wiley (born 1958) is an American rapper and minister, who is often credited as the first artist to release a Christian rap album.

== Biography ==
Wiley was born in 1958 and grew up in Muskogee, Oklahoma. A University of Oklahoma graduate, Wiley began a career as a jazz drummer in 1979. By 1982, Wiley was performing rap music with Christian lyrics, and in 1984 he took a job as chaplain at a juvenile detention center. In 1985, Wiley released the album Bible Break, the title track of which received airplay on Christian radio. A 1988 article in Spin magazine nicknamed Wiley the "Grandmaster of God". Bible Break was later acknowledged as the first Christian rap album by T-Bone in his 2002 song "Our History".

Wiley would later serve as assistant pastor/youth minister at the predominantly-black Crenshaw Christian Center in Los Angeles, CA under televangelist Frederick K.C. Price. He eventually released a total of six albums, with Rhapsody in 1991 including a guest appearance by the gospel group Witness. Wiley later founded the Praise Center Family Church in Muskogee and Tulsa, Oklahoma where he serves as pastor. He is also the Assistant Vice President, Director of Christian Ministries, and Assistant Professor of Religion at Bacone College in Muskogee where he teaches full-time.

== Discography ==
- Bible Break (Brentwood Music, 1985)
- Rappin for Jesus (Brentwood Music, 1986)
- Rap it Up (Brentwood Music, 1987)
- Get Real (Brentwood Music, 1989)
- Rhythm and Poetry (StarSong Records, 1990)
- Rhapsody (StarSong Records, 1991)
