= Jacob's Trouble =

American Christian rock band

- Origin: Atlanta, Georgia, US
- Genres: Christian rock
- Years active: 1988–1994, 2021–present
- Label: ¡Alarma!
- Members: Steve Atwell; Ron Cochran; Keith Johnston
- Past members: Mark Blackburn; Jerry Davison

Jacob's Trouble is an American Christian rock band formed in Atlanta in the 1980s. The group's original members were Jerry Davison (drums, lead vocals), Mark Blackburn (guitar, lead vocals), and Steve Atwell (bass). In 1991, they added Ron Cochran (drums) and Keith Johnston (guitar).

== Biography ==
In 1988, Jacob's Trouble formed and released an independent EP, Jacob's Trouble.

In 1989, Jacob's Trouble released their debut album which was produced by Terry Taylor, Door into Summer. It is a mixture of original numbers and cover versions of songs by the Beatles and the Monkees.

A year later, the band released their second album, Knock, Breathe, Shine. The band received notice at the time for the song "About Sex", a song about the proper role of sex in society from a Christian perspective. Fearing a fundamentalist label, the band opted to remove the song from the album and replaced it with the more ambiguous "About Sex, Part 2". Despite this, the album was the group's bestselling record. Prior to touring while promoting Knock Breathe Shine, the group added Ron Cochran on drums and guitarist Keith Johnston, allowing Davison to become the band's principal singer. One of their songs, "These Thousand Hills", was given much wider exposure when Third Day performed a cover of the song on their album Offerings.

In 1992, Jacob's Trouble released the album ...let the truth run wild! with producer Mark Heard. Near the end of the tour for ...let the truth run wild Blackburn left the band.

The band went on to record one more record, the self-titled and self-produced Jacob's Trouble. The band split after their fourth album and its subsequent tour. Diggin' Up Bones, a collection of "rarities", was released in 1994 and included the song, "About Sex". The group reunited briefly in 1998 to record "Step by Step" for The Jacob's Trouble Sampler Pak compilation album.

Jerry Davison recorded the album Uberpop! under the name sideways8 in 1998 and in the early 2000s occasionally released songs digitally. He resided in Uganda; he and his wife served as Family Mentors at The Amazima School.Jerry passed away in Jinja, Uganda, on August 6, 2025.https://www.westcobbfuneralhome.com/obituaries/jerry-davison

Mark Blackburn released two solo albums, Flowerchild (1996) and The Continuing Adventures of.... (1997). Blackburn is pastor of a church, Silver Comet Baptist Church, in his hometown of Dallas, Georgia.

In 2014, the original three members, Davison, Blackburn, and Atwell, played two reunion concerts in Dallas, Georgia for the 25th anniversary of Door into Summer. They were joined by Nathan Blackburn and Erik Davison, sons of Mark and Jerry respectively, as well as Darryl Johnson, all of whom provided additional instrumentation. They performed the album in its entirety for the first time along with some selections from Knock Breathe Shine, and two covers. A bootleg of the show received a limited digital and CD release.

== Members ==
Current

- Steve Atwell – bass guitar (1988–1994, 2021–present)
- Ron Cochran – drums (1991–1994, 2021–present)
- Keith Johnston – guitar, percussion (1991–1994, 2021–present)

Former

- Mark Blackburn – guitar (1988–1992)
- Jerry Davison – vocals (1988–1994, 2021–death in 2025)

Touring musicians

- Matt Goldman – drums (1990)

== Discography ==
=== Studio albums ===
- Door into Summer (Aug. 1989)
- Knock, Breathe, Shine (Aug. 1990)
- ...let the Truth Run Wild! (March 1992)
- Jacob's Trouble (May 1993)

=== Compilation albums ===
- Diggin' Up Bones (1994)
- The Jacob's Trouble Sampler Pak (1998)

=== Live ===
- 25LIVE: Door into Summer 25th Anniversary Concert (2014)

=== EPs ===
- Jacob's Trouble (1988)
- The Cavern Sessions (live EP) (TBA 2022)

=== Reissues ===
- Jacob's Trouble / ...let the Truth Run Wild! (1998) Double Album released by KMG
- Knock, Breathe, Shine / Door into Summer (2000) Double Album released by KMG

=== Singles ===
- "Church of Do-What-You-Want-To" (1989)
- "Waiting for the Son" (1989)
- "Million Miles" (1989)
- "Psalms 151" (1989)
- "Look at You Now" (1990)
- "There Goes My Heart Again" (1990)
- "Islands, Buildings and Freeways" (1990)
- "Further Up and Further In" (1990)
- "Something Good Happens" (1992)
- "Morning Light" (1992)
- "Walls of Doubt" (1992)
- "I'd Rather Have Jesus" (1992)
- "Hope to See You There" (1992)
- "Wild Wild Ride" (1993)
- "Lovehouse" (1993)
- "Better Days" (1993)
- "This Moment" (1993)
