= Boomerang (Mad at the World album) =

Studio album by Mad at the World
- Released: 1991
- Recorded: MATW Studios, Irvine, CA, U.S.
- Genres: Christian rock, hard rock
- Length: 35:20
- Label: Alarma
- Producer: Roger Rose

Mad at the World chronology
Seasons of Love (1990)	Boomerang (1991)	Through the Forest (1992)

Professional ratings
Review scores
Source	Rating
Jesus Freak Hideout	4.5/5 stars

Boomerang is the fourth studio album by Christian rock band Mad at the World. Released in 1991, it was their most controversial album.

== History ==
Back cover of album

In 1991 the band released Boomerang which included what has been called "the most controversial MATW song of all time," "Isn't Sex a Wonderful Thing?" The disc continued the trend of a heavier sound, with "If You Listen" rendering an atmosphere that can "make one envision a mysterious haunted mansion complete with a graveyard." The song "Sunday" drew comparisons to Alice In Chains and "Don't Give Up" "generates a sort of race car feel similar to songs by Stone Temple Pilots." Lyrically it focuses on sin, redemption, and God's love for people.

The liner notes of this disc contain the only photo in any of their discs or on their web site which shows the band smiling.

The CD sleeve contains the following text explaining the band's inspiration for the album title: "And remember, everything we do, right or wrong, kind or cruel, faithful or foolish, always comes back to you. - Galatians 6:7-8".

This album was reissued by KMG Records in 1999 on a "two-for-one" disc with Flowers in the Rain.

== Track listing ==
All songs written by Roger Rose, except "Don't Give Up" and "Sunday" written by Randy Rose, and "Dragging the Chains" written by Roger Rose and Brent Gordon

1. "House of Sin" – 2:34
2. "If You Listen" – 3:19
3. "Back to You" – 3:22
4. "Don't Give Up" – 3:08
5. "Ballad of Adam and Eve" – 3:34
6. "Sunday" – 3:08
7. "Draggin' the Chains" – 4:12
8. "All These Questions" – 4:32
9. "Isn't Sex a Wonderful Thing?" – 4:43
10. "No More Innocence (Reprise)" – 4:03

"No More Innocence" is a re-recording of the song that appeared originally on the Mad at the World album. Each version was in keeping with their respective albums, the original featuring synthesizers and a techno sound, the reprise being more hard rock.

== Personnel ==
- Roger Rose – vocals, guitars, keyboards, drums, tambourine
- Mike Pendleton – bass
- Brent Gordon – lead, rhythm guitar
- Randy Rose – vocals, drums

== Controversy over "Isn't Sex a Wonderful Thing?" ==
Boomerang included what has been called "the most controversial MATW song of all time," and one with which they "courted their share of controversy," "Isn't Sex a Wonderful Thing?" The band debuted the song at Cornerstone '89 and had planned to include the song on Seasons of Love but, said Roger Rose, "(t)he record company thought it was too controversial, they thought the only thing anyone would remember is the hook line which says 'isn't sex a wonderful thing?' People might assume I was promoting promiscuity, and not get the point." The song, which deals with incest in one stanza, "is a statement," according to Rose, "but it's actually more of a question. I have known a Christian who had been sexually molested when she was younger and I had heard how this created all these emotional scars in her." He went on to say, "In the song I talk about the bad side of sex as it's been misused in our world, and in the last verse I go back to the idea that it's given by God...sex is a wonderful thing if it follows God's rules -- which is purity before marriage, fidelity after marriage -- where sex gets God's blessing." Nonetheless, because of that song, some of the band's albums were not sold at some Christian bookstores. This includes one in the town where the Rose Brothers' parents were living.
