= Through the Forest =

Studio album by Mad at the World
- Released: 1992
- Studios: MATW Studios, Rose Studios (drum tracks only)
- Genres: Christian rock, hard rock
- Length: 38:44
- Label: Frontline
- Producer: Roger Rose

Mad at the World chronology
Boomerang (1991)	Through the Forest (1992)	The Ferris Wheel (1993)

Back cover

Through the Forest is the fifth studio album by Christian rock band Mad at the World. Released in 1992, it was their last album to feature a hard rock sound. The CD sleeve has the following text on the band's inspiration for the album's title: "Life is like the forest: It's full of beauty, mystery, danger and so many paths to choose. We all need a guide to lead us through the forest. - Psalm 119:105."

== History ==
Through the Forest was released in 1992, the band's fifth studio album and the last to feature founding member Mike Pendleton and guitarist Brent Gordon. The two would leave the band following this disc. Why Pendleton and Gordon left is unclear, Gordon makes little reference to the band on his blog and no mention of why he joined or left. In an interview, Roger said, "they didn't really quit the band--they kinda quit and got fired all at the same time." Roger thanked them in the liner notes for the next disc.

Although Roger has stated that Mad at the World was the band's first and last disc not recorded entirely at Roger's home studio, the drum tracks for Through the Forest were recorded at Randy's studio, Rose Studios.

== Track listing ==
All songs written by Roger Rose, except "Trapped" and "Alone" written by Randy Rose, and "If I Can Dream" written by W. Earl Brown.

1. "That Lonesome Road" – 4:27
2. "Trapped" – 3:44
3. "Lost in the Forest" – 3:35
4. "If I Lose My Way" – 3:31
5. "Always Be My Love" – 4:08
6. "M.A.T.W. (Reprise)" – 4:22
7. "Alone" – 5:45
8. "I've Got a Heaven" – 4:25
9. "I'll Never Go Back There" – 3:54
10. "If I Can Dream" – 2:53

"M.A.T.W. (Reprise)" is a re-recording of "Mad at the World" which appeared on the band's debut album, Mad at the World. Both versions are true to their respective albums, the first one being more techno, the reprise having a more hard rock sound.

== Personnel ==
- Roger Rose – vocals, guitars, keyboards, drums, tambourine
- Mike Pendleton – bass
- Brent Gordon – lead & rhythm guitars
- Randy Rose – vocals, drums
- Ray Rose – bass guitar on "Trapped", "Alone" and "If I Can Dream"

Ray Rose, Roger and Randy's older brother, was not a member of the band but did play bass on some of the songs.
