= The Ferris Wheel (album) =

Studio album by Mad at the World
- Released: 1993
- Recorded: MATW Studios Huntington Beach, CA; Rose Studios (drum tracks only)
- Genre: Christian rock, alternative rock
- Length: 35:17
- Language: English
- Label: Frontline Records
- Producer: Roger Rose

Mad at the World chronology
Through the Forest (1992)	The Ferris Wheel (1993)	The Dreamland Café (1995)

The Ferris Wheel is the sixth studio album by American Christian rock band Mad at the World. More of an alternative album than their previous three, it jettisoned the hard rock sound they had become known for and incorporated more of a Beatles-esque sound.

== History ==
Inside sleeve of disc showing new bandmembers.

1993 saw the release of The Ferris Wheel. This was the first disc to feature Ben Jacobs on guitar and Mike Link on bass. They joined that year to replace Mike Pendleton and Brent Gordon. The two were in Randy's solo band, Rose, and while Roger was trying to decide whether to pursue a solo career or find new band members, they were suggested by Randy as good replacements. The band's style changed radically on this disc, going from the hard rock of the previous three discs to a more retro, power pop, Beatles-esque sound. In the liner notes for the disc, Roger writes; "Extra Special Thanks To: Brent Gordon and Mike Pendleton for your friendship, years of hard work and musical contribution to M.A.T.W. with such little reward."

At 35 minutes and 17 seconds, this is the band's shortest album.

Although Roger has stated that Mad At The World. was the band's first and last disc not recorded entirely at Roger's home studio, the drum tracks for The Ferris Wheel, just like Through the Forest were recorded at Randy's studio, Rose Studios.

== Track listing ==
All songs written by Roger Rose, except "When Life Has A Plan" and "Going Nowhere Again" written by Randy Rose, and "The Love" and "No Secrets" written by Randy, Roger and Danny Rose.

1. "Not the Same" - 3:36
2. "Eyes of Heaven" - 3:15
3. "Jesus Lead Me" - 3:35
4. "No Secrets" - 3:29
5. "When Life Has a Plan" - 3:16
6. "Going Nowhere Again" - 3:36
7. "Losing Game" - 4:03
8. "All My Life" - 4:04
9. "The Love" - 3:35
10. "Inside of Heaven's Gate" - 2:41

== Personnel ==
- Roger Rose - Vocals, guitars, keyboards
- Randy Rose - Vocals, drums and percussion
- Mike Link - Bass
- Ben Jacobs - Guitar
- Ray Rose - Bass on "When Life Has A Plan", "Going Nowhere Again" and "The Love"

Ray Rose, Roger and Randy's older brother, was not an actual member of the band but did play bass on three songs.

== Video ==
This is the only disc for which a promotional video was filmed, for "Eyes Of Heaven". Available in QuickTime, it can be downloaded from the band's website.
