= Door into Summer (album) =

Door Into Summer

Studio album by Jacob's Trouble
- Released: 1989
- Recorded: 1989
- Genre: Alternative rock
- Label: Alarma
- Producer: Terry Scott Taylor

Jacob's Trouble chronology
Jacob's Trouble EP (1988)	Door Into Summer (1989)	Knock, Breathe, Shine (1990)

Door Into Summer is the debut album by Christian rock band Jacob's Trouble. It was released in 1989 and produced by Terry Scott Taylor and engineered by Gene Eugene. It featured a mixture of original numbers and cover versions of songs by The Beatles and The Monkees. AllMusic rated it two out of five stars.

== Track listing ==
1. Wind and Wave
2. Tell Me What You See (Lennon-McCartney (C) Maclen Music)
3. She Smiles At the Future
4. Church Of Do What You Want To
5. Awfully Familiar (Steve Atwell-Mark Blackburn-Jerry Davison-Terry Scott Taylor)
6. Waiting For The Son
7. Door Into Summer (Chip Douglas-Bill Martin (C) Screen Gems-EMI/Tickson Music (BMI))
8. If You Believe
9. Million Miles
10. All For You
11. Psalm 151
