= Litt Live =

Digital radio platform

LITT Live
- Original author: Dash Radio Inc.
- Release: August 19, 2014
Stable release
- Android: 5.0 / February 13, 2020; 6 years ago
- iOS: 5.10 / July 14, 2020; 6 years ago
- Operating system: iOS 11.0 or later Android 5.0 or later tvOS 9.2 or later
- Available in: 2 languages
- List of languages English, Spanish
- License: Proprietary
- Website: littlive.com

Litt Live (stylized as LITT Live, formerly Dash Radio) is a digital radio broadcasting platform with 44 radio stations. These stations are curated by DJs, radio personalities, musicians, etc. The platform includes partner stations curated by Snoop Dogg, Kylie Jenner, Lil Wayne, Tech N9ne, Borgore, B-Real of Cypress Hill, and others. Dash Radio has no subscription fees and is commercial-free.

== History ==
Dash Radio was launched on August 19, 2014, by radio-TV personality and music executive Scott Keeney, better known by his stage name DJ Skee. Keeney raised seed funding through investments from Dave Morin and Kevin Colleran of Slow Ventures investment firm, L.A. Reid (CEO of Epic Records), Matt Michelsen (CEO and founder of Backplane), Michael Lazerow (Salesforce), Adrian Peterson (RB Minnesota Vikings), Ronny Turiaf NBA World Champion, Ian Schafer (CEO of Deep Focus), Colin Carrier (CSO of Twitch) among others.

An additional $8.8 million was secured by Dash Radio in seed round funding in 2018. Investments came in from Slow Ventures, Lazerow Ventures, Nimble Ventures, Muzik, Arab Angel, G Ventures, Jason Flom (Lava Records), Orin Snyder, and Lindzon Capital Partners.

== Distribution ==
The LITT Live platform is available for Android, iOS, via desktop browsers, Sonos in-home wireless audio speaker system, Amazon Echo, and in automobiles through the AT&T Connected Car platform, Ford Sync, Apple CarPlay, Android Auto, MirrorLink, as well as Alpine Electronics, Clarion (company), Harman Kardon and Pioneer Electronics. A selection of Dash channels was offered via the free streaming service Pluto TV, in a manner akin to how Music Choice is carried on cable TV lineups; Pluto dropped the Dash stations in July 2020.

- On January 5, 2015, AT&T announced its partnership with Dash Radio, adding the app to AT&T Drive, its connected car platform.
- On September 30, 2015, Dash Radio announced a partnership with Sonos, in-home wireless audio speaker system, that connects the Dash Radio app directly to the Sonos platform.
- On December 1, 2015, T-Mobile announced its partnership with Dash Radio, adding it to its Music Freedom Program.
- In September 2016, Dash Radio announced integration with music lyric site Genius.com which would allow listeners to read lyrics and discover additional information about the artists, songs, and albums that are played on the Dash Radio platform.
- At the Consumer Electronics Show 2017, Dash Radio announced a partnership with Ford Sync, to integrate Dash Radio into all new Ford vehicles.
- In January 2017, Dash Radio announced integration with Amazon Alexa, Amazon Echo Devices.
- In December 2020, Dash Radio announced a discord bot

== Pop-up stations ==
Dash Radio also creates brand partner "pop-up stations" available for a limited time to listeners. Past pop-up stations include Stranger Things Radio, Entourage Radio, GRAMMYs On Dash, FIFA 15 Soundtrack, NBA 2K15 Soundtrack, HARDfest, Sunset Music Festival, A3C Hip-Hop Festival, Dewey Beach Festival, International Dance Music Awards, Christmas In The city, Christmas Lane, Country Christmas, Fireworks (July 4 station), Kristian Bush of Sugarland Takeover, Winter Music Conference, Wu Week Pop-Up (premiere of their album "A Better Tomorrow"), Summertime with DJ Jazzy Jeff (during Labor Day Weekend), Stevie Wonder Salute, Halo 5: Guardians Radio, The FADER 100, and Kurt Cobain Montage of Heck Pop-Up Station in partnership with Universal Pictures.

== Personalities ==
=== DJ Skee ===
DJ Skee is the founder of Dash Radio, curates "SKEENET" and hosts the "SkeeMix w/ DJ Skee". Prior to launching Dash Radio, DJ Skee hosted Skee TV which aired on Fuse, a weekly music series highlighting music and culture through live performances and interviews. Formerly, Skee hosted shows on Los Angeles' KIIS-FM and Sirius XM Satellite Radio. Skee is the first DJ to discover and play superstar artists on the radio such as Kendrick Lamar, Justin Bieber, Akon, Lorde, and Lady Gaga.

=== Snoop Dogg ===
Snoop Dogg is the founder-producer-curator of "Cadillacc Music" station and premieres DJ Snoopadelic mixes on the station. Snoop Dogg is a hip hop artist, actor, and DJ from Long Beach, California. Snoop has sold over 35 million albums worldwide including Doggystyle, Tha Doggfather and Reincarnation. He was discovered by Dr. Dre of N.W.A and made his music debut in 1992 on Dr. Dre's solo debut album The Chronic.

=== Lil Wayne ===
In March 2017, Rapper Lil Wayne announced the launch of Young Money Radio on Dash Radio and the exclusive premier of Young Money Entertainment artist HoodyBaby's new album Kitchen 24: Slangin Off Key.

=== Ice Cube ===
Ice Cube Presents: The Big3 Radio is a station designed by Ice Cube himself to embody the culture around the Big3. The station plays a new & classic Hip-Hop and hosts live shows as well featuring Tattoo The One, RoqC & Clipper Darrell.

=== Tech N9ne ===
Tech N9ne is an American rapper, founder of record label Strange Music, and curator of Independent Grind station. He has sold over two million albums and has had his music featured in films, television, and video games. Tech N9ne holds the record for performing 96 shows in 106 days. Tech N9ne has worked with Eminem, Lil Wayne, Kendrick Lamar, Wiz Khalifa, Machine Gun Kelly, and many others. On September 24, 2013, Forbes Magazine named Tech N9ne "Hip-Hop's Secret Moguls"

=== Emcee N.I.C.E. ===
Emcee N.I.C.E. is a Christian Hip Hop rapper and curates GH3 Radio - God's House of Hip Hop. Emcee N.I.C.E. is also an actor, songwriter, author and executive producer, his debut Christian Hip Hop album "Praise" achieved #1 on the Billboard Top Gospel Album chart in November 2017. N.I.C.E. also known as Aulsondro Novelist Hamilton is the co-creator and co-star of Da Jammies the first African-American animated music series to appear on Netflix. God's House will be hosting their first annual "God's House of Hip Hop 20/20 Summer Fest", focusing on fans of Christian, Latin Christian and Gospel hip-hop, the festival is slated to take place in Los Angeles at the Banc of California Stadium on July 17–18, 2020.

=== Akon ===
Akon joined the executive team as a director in March 2025. He also has a station Konvict Kulture in which it consists of afrobeats and hip hop. It features DJs Tony Neal, Q-Ball(DJ for legendary rap group Crucial Conflict, and DJ Hollygrove of The Chopstars.
