= Dynamic Twins =

American hip hop group

- Origin: California
- Genres: Christian hip hop, West Coast hip hop, conscious hip hop
- Years active: 1989–present
- Members: Noel Arthurton; Robbie Arthurton

The Dynamic Twins were a Bronx-born Christian rap group composed of identical twins Noel and Robbie Arthurton.

== Origins ==
The twins moved to California circa 1989. The group's members began to make guest appearances on albums by other Christian rap artists, including J.C. and the Boyz' Never Give Up(1989) and S.F.C.'s Listen Up(1989) and A Saved Man in the Jungle(1990). The Dynamic Twins toured with Christian Rap's more influential groups, DC Talk in the early 1990s.

== Recording debut ==
The group's first album Word 2 the Wise released in 1991 through Broken/Brainstorm Artists International, a sublabel of Word Records, and was distributed to mainstream record stores through Epic Records. S.F.C.'s Chris Cooper helped with production chores and fellow S.F.C.'er The Dove added scratching. Also guesting was Crystal Lewis, whose album "Simply the Best" had included a song penned by Noel Arthurton. 2nd album No Room 2 Breathe garnered praise from True Tunes magazine as a "landmark in the Christian rap industry" for basing itself musically around live instruments instead of programmed samples and beats.

The group was nominated three times for Dove Awards for their music and have appeared with well-known artists Westside Connection, Fred Hammond, BeBe and CeCe Winans, Crystal Lewis and Audio Adrenaline among others. They have also appeared on Fox Sports' "The Best Damn Sports Show Period" and at the Hard Rock Cafe in Dallas, Texas.

In 2005, the group appeared on a compilation album ("Holy Hip Hop:Taking the Gospel to the Streets") that was nominated for a Best Rock Gospel Album Grammy Award.

The group has also produced albums including one for the Rocket Ishmail and the first Bi-lingual Asian Holy Hip Hop artist, Only Won.

== Discography ==
- Word 2 the Wise 1991, Word/Brainstorm Artists International/Epic
- No Room 2 Breathe 1993, Word/Brainstorm Artists International/Epic
- 40 Days in the Wilderness 1995
- Above the Ground 1996 Metro One
- It's Not Done 2004 Above the Ground
- Dunamis 2006 Above the Ground
