= Frontline Records =

Christian rock record label

- Founded: 1986
- Founder: James Kempner
- Genre: Christian rock, contemporary Christian music
- Country of origin: United States
- Official website: frontlinerecords.us

Frontline Records was a Christian rock record label, founded in 1986 by James Kempner in Santa Ana, California. The label focused primarily on modern rock, rap, dance-pop and hip-hop. The label closed in the early 1990s, and then resurfaced in 2010 to digitally re-release its music catalog (including related labels).

== Beginnings and history ==
Kempner had a background in concert promotion, and had run the New Year's Eve Christian music festival series at Knott's Berry Farm, growing the event to one of the largest Christian events in the country before forming Frontline.

The label officially began by signing local bands from the Orange County, California area. In that first year, Frontline released sixteen albums. In 1986, the company signed a distribution deal with Nashville-based Benson Records to tap into their extensive sales force and distribution through Zondervan Music. Frontline Records soon transitioned to Frontline Music Group (FMG), allowing the company to create different sub-labels to promote their growing and diverse roster. This included alternative, punk, dance, pop, rock, gospel, metal, rap and hip-hop artists. Initial distribution was through Benson Records.

Artist Terry Scott Taylor became the production manager for the label, and drummer Ed McTaggart became the primary art director, designing many of the label's album covers. Imprints included Intense Records, Alarma! Records (a resurrection of Taylor's early 1980s label), and MYX Records (a dance music label supervised by former New York club DJ Scott Blackwell).

Frontline carried pop and rock artists such as Crumbächer, Crystal Lewis, Idle Cure, Jon Gibson, Altar Boys, Shout and Rick Elias. Alarma Records featured alternative music acts like Mad at the World, Jacob's Trouble, The Swirling Eddies and Poor Old Lu. Its sister label, Alarma World, was home to international-based acts like Edin-Ådahl and Walk On Water. Intense Records housed metal-based bands such as Tourniquet, Bloodgood, Sacred Warrior and Deliverance. MYX Records, a dance/hip hop division, represented many of Blackwell's own creations. Rap/hip-hop artists included Gospel Gangstaz, P.I.D. and D-Boy.

Frontline Records became an important label in the development of the West Coast Christian alternative music scene. Their roster included what 7ball magazine would later refer to as "truly classic alternative, rap, metal and rock" music. HM editor Doug Van Pelt would call "the lion's share" of classic hard Christian music.

Frontline saw growth from 1986-1991, dominating Christian media outlets and radio airwaves. In 1992, Kempner and his executive staff decided not to renew its distribution deal with Benson, instead hiring its own sales force and signed an independent distribution deal to garner more control over its own brands. Initially the move seemed to be working but soon FMG started showing signs of losing its momentum. The financial requirements to sustain itself were greater than expected. Even though some new artists were signed (most notably Angie & Debbie Winans, Gary V and Carol Huston), the label spiraled down until it could no longer keep itself afloat, and by the mid-90s closed its doors.

Frontline (and all of its assets) was acquired by Nashville-based record producer and publisher, William "Buddy" Killen (under Killen Music Group KMG Records), in early 1998. KMG released double CDs to infuse the marketplace with top-selling Frontline artists. Things went well until 2002 when Diamante, the distributor for KMG Records, folded and the label went down with it. Buddy died in November 2006 of cancer. In 2010, Carolyn Killen (executrix of his Estate) sold the Frontline publishing catalog to Meis Music Group. In 2011, the KMG, Frontline and Damascus Road Records master recordings were sold.

== Artists ==
- 12th Tribe
- Altar Boys
- American Made
- Angelica
- Apocalypse
- Bill Baumgart
- Scott Blackwell
- Bloodgood
- Christafari
- Carson Cole & RU4
- CMC's
- Common Bond
- Crumbächer
- Dead Artist Syndrome (DAS)
- Die Happy
- Lanny Cordola
- Crumbächer
- D-Boy
- Daniel Amos (DA)
- Deliverance
- Dynamic Twins
- Rick Elias
- Mark Farner (of Grand Funk Railroad)
- Gospel Gangstaz
- Jon Gibson
- Benny Hester
- Carol Huston
- Idle Cure
- Jacob's Trouble
- Paul Johnson & the Packards
- Lauren Stalnecker
- Less Is More
- Crystal Lewis
- Liaison
- Lifesavers Underground
- MC Ge Gee
- M.C.RG
- Michael Knott
- Mad at the World
- Magdallan
- Debbie McClendon
- Tim Miner
- Mortal
- Nicole (now Nicole C. Mullen)
- Nobody Special
- P.I.D.
- Poor Old Lu
- Preachaz
- Sacred Warrior
- Saviour Machine
- Scaterd Few
- S.F.C.
- Peter Shambrook
- Shout
- Mike Stand
- The Swirling Eddies
- Terry Scott Taylor
- Dr. Edward Daniel Taylor
- Tourniquet
- U.C.L.A. Gospel Choir
- Veil of Ashes
- Washington
- Wild Blue Yonder
- Angie & Debbie (of the Winans family)
- Bernard Wright
- David Zaffiro

== See also ==
- List of Christian record labels
