= KMG Records =

American Christian record label

- Founded: 1997
- Founder: Buddy Killen
- Distributors: Independent (1997–2006); Warner Music Group (2006–present)
- Genre: Various
- Country of origin: United States
- Location: San Francisco, California, U.S.
- Official website: www.warnerrecords.com

KMG (Killen Music Group) Records was a Christian record label. The label was established in 1997 by Buddy Killen as a subunit of the Killen Music Group / Buddy Killen Enterprises and sold in late 1998 to Cal Turner III, who is related to the Cal Turner of Dollar General stores. Following the sale, Buddy Killen continued to consult for the firm.

The Killen Music Group also operated several other including Damascus Road Records, Praise Hymn Soundtracks, Sound Performance Soundtracks and Psalm 150 music. Damascus Road was pop oriented, and released albums by Morgan Cryar, Rhonda Gunn, Identical Strangers, and Dave Kauffman.

== Operations ==
Notable management include Terry Scott Taylor (A&R 1997–1999), Billy Smiley (A&R 1999–2002, formerly of White Heart), Kevin Jackson (formerly of the band Chase and Dajhelon Entertainment Group), David Bahnsen (formerly of Tooth & Nail), and Frank Chimento (formerly of 7ball magazine).

In addition to its own portfolio of artists KMG acquired the assets of Frontline Records, whose catalog consisted of a large number of alternative Christian music bands. KMG began re-releasing many of these albums as double-disc sets. The re-releases had covers which were described as generic, and contained only the cover images of the album inset around a purple background. Inside was a one-page description of the band, and the albums contained no extended or tribute material.

At different times distribution was handled through Diamante and Pamplin Music.

== Original artists ==
Artists who released original, unreleased material through KMG include:

- According to John
- Rick Altizer
- American Made
- Ric Blair
- Bunch of Believers
- Lanny Cordola
- Andy Denton
- Every Day Life (EDL)
- Fono
- Glisten
- Gospel Gangstaz
- Heather Miller
- The Insyderz
- Michael Knott (as Browbeats)
- Mortal
- Poor Old Lu
- The Straw Theory
- Terry Scott Taylor
