= Propaganda discography =

- Studio albums: 5
- EPs: 2
- Compilation albums: 12
- Music videos: 11
- Guest appearances: 23

The discography of Propaganda (birth name Jason Emmanuel Petty), an American Christian hip hop and spoken word artist and poet from Los Angeles, California, consists of five studio albums, two EPs, twelve compilation appearances, eleven music videos, including one as a featured performer, and twenty-three guest appearances.

Discovered by the underground hip hop collective Tunnel Rats, Petty made his debut in 2002 on Speak Life by Sev Statik. On April 8, 2003, he released his solo debut album, Out of Knowhere, with UpRok Records, and recorded as part of the Tunnel Rats on Underground Rise, Volume 1: Sunrise/Sunset. He then recorded with the Tunnel Rats for the collective's 2004 self-titled album. In 2006, he released the I Am Not Them EP with Tunnel Rat Music and recorded Live This as part of the Tunnel Rats-affiliated group Footsoldiers. Footsoldiers also collaborated with KRS-One on his album Life, with Petty appearing on the song "I Ain't Leaving", and DJ Tony Touch released a mixtape featuring the group. Petty released a second solo EP, The Sketchbook: A Small Collection of Unreleased Material, independently in 2008, and his second album, Listen Watch Focus, also came out in 2008 through End of Earth Records.

Petty's next three albums were all released through the Portland-based Humble Beast Records. The first, entitled Art Ambidextrous, was recorded in collaboration with Odd Thomas, and came out in 2011. Petty's third solo album, Excellent, came out in 2012, and charted at No. 7 on the Billboard Top Gospel chart. Petty's fourth solo album, Crimson Cord came out on April 29, 2014, and charted at No. 5 on the Billboard Top Christian chart, No. 2 on the Top Gospel, and No. 8 on the Top Rap chart.

== Albums ==
=== Studio albums ===
List of studio albums, with selected chart positions
Title	Album details	Peak chart positions					
Title	Album details	US	US Christ.	US Gospel	US Ind.	US Rap	US Digital
Out of Knowhere	Released: April 8, 2003; Formats: CD, digital download	—	—	—	—	—	—
Listen Watch Focus	Released: September 16, 2008; Label: End of Earth; Formats: CD, digital download	—	—	—	—	—	—
Art Ambidextrous	Released: February 1, 2011; Label: Humble Beast; Formats: CD, digital download; Collaboration with Odd Thomas	—	—	—	—	—	—
Excellent	Released: September 25, 2012; Label: Humble Beast; Formats: CD, digital download	184	14	7	43	19	—
Crimson Cord	Released: April 29, 2014; Label: Humble Beast; Formats: CD, digital download	55	5	2	13	8	19
Crooked	Released: June 30, 2017; Label: Humble Beast; Formats: CD, digital download	—	4	—	—	—	—

=== Compilation albums ===
List of compilation albums
Title	Album details
Uprok Records Mixtapes, Vol. 2	Released: October 7, 2003; Compilation album; Contributed tracks: "Don't Let Us Lose It" "Here for Years" (with Peace 586 and Dokument)
What Are You Listening To? Hip Hop Vol. 2	Released: 2003; Label: Chordant; Compilation album; Contributed tracks: "Move With Me"
Night Owls 4: A Shot In The Dark	Released: January 8, 2007; Label: Syntax; Compilation album; Contributed tracks: "We Ran With It" (with Capture and Sojourn)
Humble Beast - Humble Beginnings Vol. 1	Released: June 22, 2010; Label: Humble Beast; Compilation album; Contributed tracks: "Beautiful Pain"
Streetlights Sampler	Released: 2010; Label: Humble Beast; Spoken word compilation album; Contributed tracks: "Psalm 69"
End of Earth Classics, Volume 2	Released: 2011; Label: End of Earth; Compilation album; Contributed tracks: "Make Music" (with Afaar and Ruslan)
End of Earth Classics, Volume 7	Released: 2011; Label: End of Earth; Compilation album; Contributed tracks: "True and Living" (with Sev Statik)
End of Earth Classics, Volume 8	Released: 2011; Label: End of Earth; Compilation album; Contributed tracks: "Give MaMa A Kiss" (with Zane One)
Illect Recordings: Mind the Rap, Vol. 2	Released: June 26, 2011; Label: Illect; Compilation album; Contributed tracks: "Say Word" (Peace 586 featuring Propaganda and Sev Statik)
Nashville Publicity Group Presents TEN	Released: 2013; Label: NPG; Compilation album; Contributed tracks: "Raise the Banner"
King Kulture: Stop the Traffic	Released: August 27, 2013; Label: Rapzilla; Charity compilation; Contributed tracks: "Healthy Don't Need Doctors"
Selected Songs	Released: March 4, 2016; Label: Fair Trade Services; Compilation album

=== EPs ===
List of extended plays
Title	Album details
I Am Not Them EP	Released: July 11, 2006; Label: Tunnel Rat; CD
The Sketchbook: A Small Collection of Unreleased Material	Released: 2008; Label: none (independent); CD

== Guest appearances ==
List of guest appearances
Title	Year	Other performer(s)	Album
"Warning"	2002	Dokument, Sev Statik	Speak Life
"Here For Years"	2003	Peace 586	Generations
"Freedom"	2005	Macho, Triune	Freedom
"Give It 2 Me"	2005	Elsie, Shihan	The Poet
"Alive at the Assembly Line"	2006	Othello, Vursatyl of Lifesavas	Alive at the Assembly Line
"I Ain't Leavin'"	2006	KRS-One	Life
"True and Living"	2006	Sev Statik	Sliver
"Give Mamma a Kiss"	2009	Zane One	L.A. Woman
"Tell Me Why"	2009	Zane One	L.A. Woman
"More Than Seen"	2009	Ohmega Watts, Sareem Poems	Black & Read All Over
"Off Road (4X4)"	2009	Ahred, Shames Worthy, Soujourn	Soujournalism: The Summer Articles
"Say Word"	2010	Peace 586, Sev Statik	aBle
"Reality Check"	2011	Twisted Optiks	H.E.A.R.T.
"Surprise Party [Sweet 16's Remix]"	2011	Evangel, Phanatik, Stephen The Levite, Willie Will, Young Joshua	Party Over Here
"Dear God"	2011	Macho	Remember
"Winner's Circle (We Major Remake)"	2012	High Society Collective	Circa MMXI: The Collective
"Misconception"	2012	DJ Efechto, Beautiful Eulogy, Lecrae	Church Clothes
"Wonderful"	2012	Beautiful Eulogy	Satellite Kite
"Finna Be"	2013	The Battery	Two
"Rise"	2013	Braille, Cha'Rel Wright, Proxy	Magnificent
"Symbols and Signs"	2013	Beautiful Eulogy	Instruments of Mercy
"We Got What You Want"	2013	Crystal Cameron, Sareem Poems, Sivion	Group Therapy
"Hands Up"	2013	Lecrae	Church Clothes 2
"Problem"	2014	Canon, Chad Jones	Keep Up
"Problem (Instrumental)"	2014	Canon, Chad Jones	Keep Up
"Problem (Acapella)"	2014	Canon, Chad Jones	Keep Up
"Fight Music	2014	KJ-52, Lecrae	Mental
"Gangland"	2016	Lecrae	Church Clothes 3
"Make a Little Trouble"	2017	Stu Garrard	Beatitudes
"Only 1"	2018	William Matthews	Kosmos

== Music videos ==
=== As lead artist ===
List of music videos and spoken word performances
Title	Year	Director
"Life in 6 Words: G.O.S.P.E.L."	2011	—
"Empowerment"	2011	—
"The Canvas"	2011	—
"Justice and the Gospel"	2012	—
"Excellent"	2012	Darren Doane
"Be Present"	2012	—
"Dont Listen to Me & Be Present"	2013	—
"Redefined Cutter"	2013	DJ Dust
"The Prodigal Sons"	2013	—
"Crimson Cord"	2014	Isaac Dowell

=== As featured artist ===
List of music videos
Title	Year	Director
"Symbols and Signs" (Beautiful Eulogy featuring Propaganda)	2014	Isaac Dowell
