= Fly Exam =

Studio album by JGivens
- Released: September 25, 2015
- Genre: Christian hip Hop
- Length: 47:15
- Label: Humble Beast

JGivens chronology
El v. Envy (2013)	Fly Exam (2015)

Fly Exam is the third studio album from JGivens. Humble Beast Records released the album on September 25, 2015.

== Critical reception ==
Professional ratings
Review scores
Source	Rating
Jesus Freak Hideout	4/5 stars
Jesus Wired	88%
Reel Gospel	4/5 stars

Awarding the album four stars at Jesus Freak Hideout, Kevin Hoskins states, "J keeps it fully creative, but still manages to keep most tracks on point and they come out well." Randy "Mr. Hip Hop" Mason, giving the album an 88 percent for Jesus Wired, writes, "Fly Exam brilliantly begins prior to pressing play, as the cover art possesses a substantial part of the whole experience...Overall, Fly Exam is a well told story about the flight, and plight of humanity. It’s equally entertaining, as it is convicting. JGivens and Humble Beast once again raise the bar with this creative effort delivered in excellence." Rating the album four stars from Reel Gospel, Carlin Doyle says, "Overall, Fly Exam is a work of art. It is an intricately crafted album from start to finish, in production and content."

== Track listing ==
No.	Title	Writer(s)	Producer(s)	Length
1.	"Ignorantro"	Jeremiah Givens, Bryan Winchester, Daniel Steele	Daniel Steele	2:43
2.	"Butterfly Stance"	J. Givens, Elizabeth Vice, Courtland Urbano, D. Steele	Courtland Urbano, Daniel Steele	2:07
3.	"Fahrenheit 99" (featuring Liz Vice)	J. Givens, E. Vice, D. Steele	Daniel Steele	3:21
4.	"So Fly" (featuring Beleaf)	J. Givens, Glen Henry, D. Steele, Shawn Carter	Daniel Steele	4:16
5.	"10, 2 Get In" (featuring Odd Thomas)	J. Givens, Thomas Terry, B. Winchester, C. Urbano, G. Henry	Beautiful Eulogy	4:41
6.	"Attack of the Clones" (featuring John Givez and Jackie Hill Perry)	J. Givens, Jacqueline Hill Perry, John Lawrence Givens, D. Steele	Daniel Steele	3:33
7.	"Fly Exam"	J. Givens	Daniel Steele	2:06
8.	"Lost in Space" (featuring Marz Ferrer)	J. Givens, Martina Ferrer, D. Steele	Daniel Steele	3:26
9.	"Hummingbird Stance"	J. Givens, Anthony Cruz	1995	4:29
10.	"Super Lowkey"	J. Givens, C. Urbano	Courtland Urbano	2:59
11.	"Take off with Me" (featuring John Givez)	J. Givens, J. L. Givens, B. Winchester, C. Urbano, T. Terry	Beautiful Eulogy	3:59
12.	"March 10th and a 3rd" (featuring Braille)	J. Givens, B. Winchester, C. Urbano	Courtland Urbano	4:30
13.	"They Said There'd Be Jetpacks" (featuring Propaganda)	J. Givens, Jason Petty, D. Steele	Daniel Steele	5:13
Total length:				47:15

== Chart performance ==
Chart (2015)	Peak position
US Christian Albums (Billboard)	11
US Heatseekers Albums (Billboard)	6
US Independent Albums (Billboard)	34
US Top Rap Albums (Billboard)	19
