= Gravity (Lecrae album) =

Album by Lecrae

Studio album by Lecrae
- Released: September 4, 2012
- Recorded: February–July 2012
- Studios: Music House Studios, Atlanta, Georgia
- Genre: Christian hip hop
- Length: 56:28
- Label: Reach Records
- Producers: Andy Mineo (add.); Big Juice; The Bridge; Courtland Urbano; Dirty Rice; DJ Efechto; DJ Khalil; DJ Official; Dru Castro; Street Symphony; Heat Academy; Joseph Prielozny; Lecrae (exec.); Lincoln "Bar-None" Morris (vocal); PRo (add.); Rudy Currence; Tha Kracken; ThaInnaCircle; Tyshane; Uforo Ebong; The Watchmen (J.R., Alex Medina & Wit); Zach Crowell

Lecrae chronology
Church Clothes (2012)	Gravity (2012)	Church Clothes Vol. 2 (2013)

Singles from Gravity
- 1. "I Know" Released: July 24, 2012; 2. "Lord Have Mercy" Released: August 1, 2012; 3. "Tell the World" Released: August 15, 2012; 4. "Mayday" Released: August 30, 2012

Gravity is the sixth studio album by American Christian hip hop artist Lecrae, released on September 4, 2012. The album features appearances from Big K.R.I.T., Mathai, Ashthon Jones, Sho Baraka and Mali Music, along with labelmates Trip Lee, Andy Mineo, Derek Minor, who was formerly known as PRo, and Tedashii. Producers on the album include DJ Khalil, Street Symphony along with his production team Heat Academy, and The Watchmen. The first single off the album, "I Know", was released on July 24, 2012, and was followed by "Tell the World" featuring Mali Music on August 15, 2012, and "Mayday" featuring Big K.R.I.T. and Ashthon Jones on August 30, 2012. Reach Records released five music videos for the album: "Lord Have Mercy", featuring Tedashii along with No Malice of Clipse, on August 1, 2012, "Tell the World", featuring Mali Music, on October 19, 2012, "Mayday", featuring Big K.R.I.T. and Ashthon Jones, on December 13, 2012, "Fakin'", featuring Thi'sl, on February 1, 2013, and "Confe$$ions", featuring David Banner, on April 30, 2013.

The first week of sales for the album set a new record for Lecrae, with Gravity debuting at No. 3 on the Billboard 200 with 72,000 units sold, and was the biggest sales week ever for a Christian hip hop album. The bonus track "Fuego" featuring KB and Suzy Rock from the iTunes deluxe edition of the album peaked at No. 20 on the Billboard Top Heatseekers Songs, No. 13 on the R&B/Hip-Hop Digital charts, and No. 64 on the Hot Digital Songs charts. Critically, Gravity was very well received, and is considered Lecrae's strongest, most mainstream work to date. It won Best Gospel Album at the 2013 Grammy Awards and Best Rap/Hip Hop Album at the 2013 Dove Awards.

== Background ==
Gravity is a follow-up to the mixtape Church Clothes, which was released earlier in 2012, and Lecrae's two previous studio albums, Rehab, which was released in September 2010, and Rehab: The Overdose, which followed five months later. The Church Clothes mixtape was released for free on May 10, 2012, and was hosted by DJ Don Cannon. It was considered Lecrae's step into the mainstream due to his collaboration with artists such as No Malice of Clipse and the producers 9th Wonder, Boi-1da, S1 and Street Symphony. The featuring of mainstream artists, particularly Don Cannon, was controversial within Christian circles. The mixtape was downloaded on DatPiff.com almost 100,000 times within 48 hours and in less than a month reached 250,000 downloads, a platinum rating on DatPiff.com.

Lecrae said to AllHipHop: "With the release of Gravity, I really wanted to expand on my previous work while still making sure to keep it all very authentic to who I am as an artist as well as a person[.] When I released Church Clothes earlier this year, it was the precursor of what's come with this album. It introduced my music to new audiences, allowing me to impact others."

== Recording and production ==
Lecrae stated in an exclusive video with AllHipHop that after recording Church Clothes in March, he was on the road before beginning recording for Gravity in May. In an article by SOHH, Lecrae revealed that he had started work on the album in February, then wrapped up recording during the mid-year. The album was recorded over the next couple months at Music House Studios in Atlanta, Georgia. On July 10, 2012, Christian hip hop website Rapzilla reported that Lecrae had shot a music video with No Malice of Clipse and with his labelmate Tedashii. The report included photographs from the video set.

Much of the production on the album was handled by producers with whom Lecrae has worked with in the past, chiefly The Watchmen and Heat Academy. The Watchmen consists of the producers J.R., Alex Medina, and Wit while Heat Academy is led by Street Symphony. DJ Khalil, whose past production work includes Recovery by Eminem, produced the track "Mayday", which features Big K.R.I.T. and American Idol season 10 finalist Ashthon Jones. Tyshane, who previously contributed to a track from Church Clothes, co-produced the song "Violence" with ThaInnaCircle. Other producers include Dirty Rice, DJ Official, Dru Castro, and Joseph Prielozny. Walk with Me", featuring Novel, included a sample of "I Want Jesus to Walk With Me" by Solomon Burke. The producer, Alex Medina, waited 9 years to use the sample.

Besides Big K.R.I.T. and Ashthon Jones, the album also features appearances by The Voice finalist Mathai, Mali Music, and Reach Records artists Trip Lee and Tedashii. On working with Big K.R.I.T., Lecrae stated to Billboard that K.R.I.T. had already reached out to him before the collaboration to show his appreciation for Lecrae's honesty. In an interview with AllHipHop, Lecrae mentioned that both he and Big K.R.I.T. have similar backgrounds, having both grown up in the Southern United States and struggled with religion under the influence of a religious grandmother.

== Promotion and marketing ==
On May 31, 2012, Rapzilla posted an article featuring photos and tweets from the Gravity recording sessions. A teaser video for the album was released on YouTube on June 20, 2012, and announced that the album would be released in the latter half of 2012. On July 10, 2012, Family Christian made the album available for pre-order, and Rapzilla used this information to announce the following day that the release date was September 4, 2012. Also on July 10, Lecrae posted photos from his video shoot with No Malice and Tedashii. Rapzilla responded a few days later with speculation over the possibility that in one photo Lecrae's T-shirt bore the logo of Gravity.

On July 17, 2012, Lecrae performed with his labelmate Andy Mineo at an Apple Store in SoHo, New York City. The performance included live renderings of songs from Rehab and Gravity. The following day, Lecrae held an exclusive preview session of the album at The Cutting Room with his industry friends and select publications including AllHipHop and Billboard. The cover art to Gravity was revealed the day after, along with an official announcement of the release date.

The lead single from the album, "I Know", was released on July 24, 2012, as a complimentary free download upon pre-ordering of the album. On July 27, 2012, Billboard reported about Gravity in its daily news show The Beat. Rapzilla also made the single available for streaming on SoundCloud. On the same day, the album's tracklist was revealed. The music video for "Lord Have Mercy" was released on August 1, 2012. On August 7, 2012, a deluxe version of Gravity was made available for preorder on iTunes. This version includes three bonus songs featuring appearances from Suzy Rock, Tenth Avenue North, and KB, and according to Rapzilla, the album already reached the No. 9 spot on the iTunes Hip-Hop/Rap Chart. Later the same day, the deluxe version moved up the No. 2 spot on the iTunes Hip-Hop/Rap Chart and No. 18 overall on iTunes. On August 14, 2012, Lecrae launched a website for the album, and released the single "Tell the World" featuring Mali Music on August 15, 2012. According to a photo posted on Lecrae's Instagram account, on August 15, 2012, Lecrae held another private listening session at New Era Flagship Store in Atlanta. On August 23, 2012, Rapzilla reported that Lecrae had shot a music video with Mali Music for the single "Tell the World". The following day, a promotional video for the album, entitled "It All Comes Down", was released. The fourth single for the album, "Mayday", featuring Big K.R.I.T. and Ashthon Jones, was released on August 30, 2012. The music video for "Tell the World" was released on October 19, 2012, and announcements were made that Lecrae had filmed music videos for "Fakin'", featuring Thi'sl, and "Mayday". The video for "Mayday" aired December 13, 2012 on the MTV Networks channels MTV Jams, mtvU, and MTV2. On February 1, 2013, Lecrae released the music video for "Fakin'" on MTV and MTV2, and it quickly reached No. 1 on the MTV.com Top Video Picks. Lecrae released the fifth and final music video from the album, "Confe$$ions", on April 30, 2013, on BET's 106 & Park It features an acting appearance by David Banner.

== Lyrics and style ==
When asked what sets Gravity apart from his previous releases, Lecrae stated that "Obviously, there's more risk involved in terms of just making more mature music that's not as straight [and] explicit. it's dealing with bigger issues. People may have to think a little bit more. The production is a lot bigger and more advanced than it's been. Lyrically, as an artist, I think I've written some of the best lyrics I've ever written." Lecrae provided insight into the album's concept during an interview with Family Christian, stating that "Gravity is loosely based on Ecclesiastes and I think what Solomon was trying to do was bring some weight to life and that’s really what I want to do, to paint some sober pictures." He described that "there’s a sober picture of how it’s only for a short period of time, it’s short-lived, or that we still have Jesus. So that’s what I would call a weighty part, a gravitational pull to remind us of who we are in Jesus." Billboard stated that Lecrae increased his level of production for Gravity and "mixed reggae and soul influences with his signature brash sound." AllHipHop described the album as opening with "an influx of instruments like violin, drums, guitars". "I Know" was described as having one of the hardest beats on the album, while "Mayday" was considered one of the most "organic" sounding tracks. "Violence" was considered one of the most energetic tracks, and was described as "caribbean-esque" with a dancehall vibe. After the music video for "Lord Have Mercy" was released, an article in The Christian Post article compared the song to the Kanye West single "Mercy", both in its title and musical style. The article elaborated that "like Kanye West's song, "'Lord Have Mercy' features slowed down sampled vocals for its chorus along with heavy bass and an overall dark tone." It noted the appearance of No Malice in the video, stating that "the chorus seems to sample his voice."

== Artwork and packaging ==
In a blog for the Houston Chronicle, hip-hop writer Sketch the Journalist posted an article on the cover and promotional artwork for Gravity. He compared the cover as a combination of those from Quarantine by GRITS and Get Rich or Die Tryin' by 50 Cent, and compared the promotional art to that of Braille and S1's CloudNineteen. Sketch subsequently updated the post based on a reader comment, and added the cover of De La Soul's AOI: Bionix in combination with the promo art for CloudNineteen in his comparison of Gravity's cover art.

== Touring ==
Three release parties were held for the album. The first occurred on September 28, 2012, in Manchester, United Kingdom, followed by Denver, Colorado on the 27th and Houston, Texas, on the 28th.

In support of the album, Lecrae toured with his entire label roster, consisting of Tedashii, Trip Lee, KB, Andy Mineo, and PRo, along with special guests Propaganda and Thi'sl. The tour ran from October through November and stopped at 30 cities across the United States and Canada.

== Reception ==
=== Commercial reception ===
Upon its release, Gravity debuted at No. 3 on the Billboard 200, with 72,000 units sold. This set a career high for Lecrae, whose previous highest sales week was 27,000 units with Rehab, and was the best sales week ever for a Christian hip hop album. By September 23, 2012, the album had sold 103,000 copies. In the first week of sales, the iTunes deluxe edition of the album reached number No. 1 on that vendor's hip-hop/rap albums chart, while the regular version of the album came in second place, a feat that prompted a write-up on Lecrae in Time. Rapzilla initially reported that the deluxe edition of the album had also reached the No. 2 spot on the overall iTunes album chart, and this report was subsequently updated to reflect deluxe version of Gravity reaching No. 1 on that chart. In addition, the bonus song "Fuego" from the deluxe edition reached No. 5 on the iTunes top hip-hop/rap songs chart. The song charted at No. 20 on the Billboard Top Heatseekers Songs, No. 13 on the R&B/Hip-Hop Digital charts, and No. 64 on the Hot Digital Songs charts. According to Inquisitr, in the same week of the release of Gravity, the iTunes version of Church Clothes jumped to the No. 4 spot on the top hip-hop/rap albums chart. As of November 28, 2012, the album has sold 150,000 copies in the U.S.

=== Critical reception ===
Professional ratings
Review scores
Source	Rating
AllHipHop	8.5/10
Allmusic	4/5 stars
CCM Magazine	4/5 stars
Christianity Today	4/5 stars
Cross Rhythms	10/10 stars
DaSouth.com	4.5/5 stars
Jesus Freak Hideout	4/5 stars
New Release Tuesday	4/5 stars
RapReviews.com	8/10
Rapzilla	4.5/5 stars

Both AllHipHop and Billboard were very positive toward Gravity after a preview listening session, considering it Lecrae's strongest and most mainstream work to date. AllHipHop stated that "overall, it appears that Lecrae is ready to offer one of his most broad and, dare-we-say, mainstream albums in terms of sound; yet, it still manages to capture the trueness of what he has always stood for and rapped about. If anything, Gravity is a giant step forward for his expanding career, and it will surely be a welcome addition to many 'Top 10' lists when 2012 comes to a close." Indie Vision Music in announcing the cover of Gravity called the album "likely the biggest Christian hip hop album yet". AllHipHop listed "Mayday" as one of the standout tracks on the album, noting the "beautiful" melody and hook by Ashthon Jones. The reviewer considered "Violence" a personal favorite, calling Lecrae's line "Grew up under Tupac, bible verse and two glocks" one of the most powerful lines on the album. Parlé Magazine also was favorable to the song, stating "That track is definitely going places." Jonathan Landrum of The Associated Press was favorable to the album, saying that "in his sixth album 'Gravity,' Lecrae delivers a strong piece of work. He's not afraid to rap about his past mistakes, supplying inspirational rhymes filled with Christian values backed by well-produced secular hip-hop beats." In its track-by-track review of the album, The Boombox stated that "based on the warm reception to Church Clothes, this LP is set to stir the pot further in the realm of both of hip-hop and Christianity." David Jeffries of Allmusic gave the album four out of five stars, declaring that Lecrae makes Gravity's various genre experiments and jumps in style "sound effortless and natural". He asserted that "while Rehab is the more rewarding album in the end, this one is more persuasive and immediate, making it an easy entry point into this gifted artist's discography."

In an initial review by Jesus Freak Hideout, Kevin Hoskins rated the album four out of five stars, calling the album solid but finding that the album's R&B passages "pale in comparison to the other tracks stylistically and are not necessarily needed." Hoskins listed the songs "Falling Down," "Power Trip," "Lord Have Mercy," and "I Know" as some of the best tunes, and called "Lucky Ones" a "perfect song." New Release Tuesday called Gravity one of the most anticipated releases of the year. In its review, the site gave the album four out of five stars, stating that the recording in many ways lives up to the anticipation, but had three or four too many songs that detract from the album's whole. Rapzilla was very favorable to the album, rating it four-point-five out of five and calling it the most important album in the history of Christian hip hop. The reviewer, Armond Goss, listed the tracks "Lord Have Mercy", "Fakin'", and "Buttons" the low points on the album, but said that those were the only problems that they found. "Confe$$ions", "Power Trip", and "Gravity" were all listed by as extremely strong, but Goss considered the track "Mayday" as the best track "sonically, lyrically and conceptually" on the album, stating that DJ Khalil's production work "provides the perfect backdrop for K.R.I.T. to walk into your church in the middle of service and express his frustrations with hypocrisies and for Crae to walk in behind him and calm the mob down while still co-signing K.R.I.T.’s verse." The Houston Press summarized the album by stating that "by and large, Gravity acts and dresses like a stand along rap album built from the same organ drenched and string heavy foundation that Houston's style of G-funk did in the '90s. It's another "heavy" rap album to drive away from the same escapism tactics rap loves to dwell in."

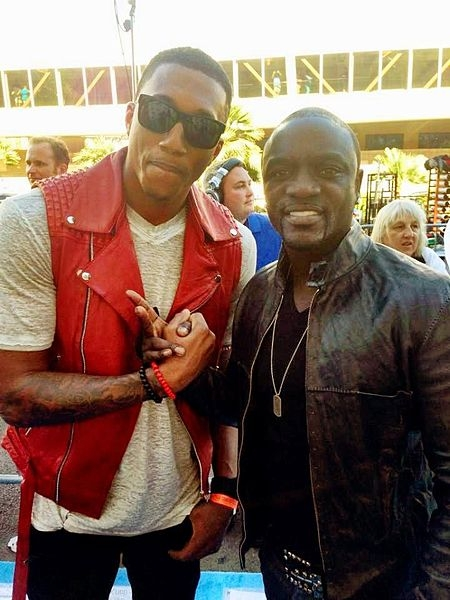
Lecrae (left) and Akon (right) at the 2013 Billboard Music Awards.

At CCM Magazine, Andy Argyrakis said that Lecrae has "officially arrived as the top star in the scene", and that the artist has "his finger on today's production trends (and certainly being ahead of the curve on a few occasions), his rhymes are packed with so much authenticity that even the most mainstream-minded listener has the potential to connect." Anthony Peronto of Christian Music Zine rated the album 4.75 out of five, and said that "loosely inspired by the book of Ecclesiastes, Gravity is so far the most important CHH album ever made and bridges the gap between Christian and the secular rap scenes." At Cross Rhythms, Steve Hayes wrote that this is Lecrae's "finest project to date", called it "brilliantly produced [and] explosively impacts the listener", and said the release would be "enjoyed for years to come." New Release Tuesday's Mark Ryan noted that "there are 3 or 4 songs too many on the album that detract from the album as a whole", which is the reason he did not "get overly excited", but he did affirm that "fans and newcomers alike will enjoy the album".

=== Awards ===
Gravity won Best Gospel Album for the 2013 Grammy Awards. This was the first time that a hip-hop artist has won this award. At the 2013 Dove Awards, the album won Rap/Hip Hop Album, and the song "Tell the World", featuring Mali Music, won Rap/Hip Hop Recorded Song of the Year. Gravity also won Best Rap, Hip Hop Gospel CD of the Year at the 2014 Stellar Awards. The album was also nominated for Top Christian Album at the 2013 Billboard Music Awards.

=== Initial release competition with T.I. ===
On July 19, 2012, Rapzilla posted an article entitled "Is Lecrae and T.I. similar to Kanye vs 50 Cent?", which noted that Trouble Man by T.I. was scheduled for release the same day as Gravity. The article speculated that the potential cultural impact of Gravity could be like that of Kanye West after his 2007 competition with 50 Cent. The writer, Steven Patton, stated that "we may be on the cusp of another watershed moment this coming September. Two artists living in Atlanta and largely the front runners of two different ideologies are releasing a new album on the same day." A few hours after being posted, the article was updated stating that the release date for Trouble Man was being pushed back to September 19. However, the release date was subsequently returned to September 4, before T.I. announced that he was pushing the album back indefinitely. Trouble Man ultimately was released on December 18, 2012, and debuted at No. 2 on the Billboard 200, selling 179,000 copies.

== Track listing ==
No.	Title	Writer(s)	Producer(s)	Length
1.	"The Drop (Intro)"	L. Moore; T. Esmond; C. Dunlap; L. Morris; J. Prielozny; CJ Luzi	Heat Academy; Joseph Prielozny	2:55
2.	"Gravity" (featuring J.R.)	L. Moore; R. Currence; C. Peebles	J.R.	3:42
3.	"Walk with Me" (featuring Novel)	L. Moore; A. Stevenson; S. Burke; A. Medina; C. Peebles; E. Shahbzian	The Watchmen	3:15
4.	"Free From It All" (featuring Mathai)	L. Moore; D. Castro; U. Ebong	Dru Castro; Uforo Ebong	3:34
5.	"Fallin' Down" (featuring Swoope and Trip Lee)	L. Moore; A. Swoope; W. Barefield; A. Medina; C. Peebles; E. Shahbzian	The Watchmen	4:58
6.	"Fakin'" (featuring Thi'sl)	L. Moore; T. Tyler; T. Esmond; C. Dunlap; L. Morris	Heat Academy	4:06
7.	"Violence"	L. Moore; K. Richards; T. Thompson; D. O. Okoth; M. Jefferson	Tyshane; ThaInnaCircle	3:09
8.	"Mayday" (featuring Big K.R.I.T. and Ashthon Jones)	L. Moore; J. Scott; A. Jones; L. Morris; T. Esmond; K. Abdul-Rahman; P. Injeti; C. T-Smith; D. Tannenbaum	DJ Khalil; Lincoln "Bar-None" Morris (vocal)	4:54
9.	"Confe$$ions"	L. Moore; Z. Crowell; D. O. Okoth; M. Jefferson; T. Esmond; J. Prielozny; C. Mackey	Zach Crowell; Joseph Prielozny; Dirty Rice	3:18
10.	"Buttons"	L. Moore; T. Esmond; C. Dunlap; L. Williams; N. Sims; J. Norlin	Heat Academy	3:46
11.	"Power Trip" (featuring PRo, Sho Baraka and Andy Mineo)	L. Moore; D. Johnson; A. Lewis; A. Mineo; N. Chu	DJ Official; PRo (add.); Andy Mineo (add.)	3:58
12.	"Lord Have Mercy" (featuring Tedashii)	L. Moore; T. Anderson; G. Thornton; T. Esmond; C. Dunlap; L. Morris	Heat Academy	3:36
13.	"I Know"	L. Moore; N. Sims; A. Medina; C. Peebles; E. Shahbzian	The Watchmen	3:18
14.	"Tell the World" (featuring Mali Music)	L. Moore; K. Pollard; T. Esmond; C. Dunlap; L. Morris	Heat Academy	3:36
15.	"Lucky Ones" (featuring Rudy Currence)	L. Moore; R. Currence; A. Medina; C. Peebles; E. Shahbzian; J. Prielozny; J. Ezell	The Watchmen; Rudy Currence; Joseph Prielozny	4:37

iTunes deluxe edition
No.	Title	Writer(s)	Producer(s)	Length
16.	"No Regrets" (featuring Suzy Rock)	L. Moore; N. Sims	Big Juice; Street Symphony	3:36
17.	"Higher" (featuring Tenth Avenue North)	L. Moore; M. Donehey; J. Owen; J. Jamison; R. Juarez III; B. Shirley; T. Rohn; P. Guillory	The Bridge; Tyler Rohn	3:08
18.	"Fuego" (featuring KB and Suzy Rock)	L. Moore; K. Burgess; N.Sims	Dirty Rice; Joseph Prielozny	3:47

Best Buy exclusive
No.	Title	Producer(s)	Length
16.	"Misconception (DJ Official Remix)" (featuring Beautiful Eulogy, Propaganda, and DJ Efechto)	Courtland Urbano; DJ Efechto; DJ Official	4:23
17.	"I Know (Tha Kracken Remix)"	The Watchmen; Tha Kracken	3:12

=== Music Videos ===
- "Lord Have Mercy" (featuring Tedashii)
- "Tell the World" (featuring Mali Music)
- "Mayday" (featuring Big K.R.I.T. & Ashthon Jones)
- "Fakin'" (featuring Thi'sl)
- "Confessions"

== Gravity: The Remix EP ==
Gravity: The Remix EP

Remix album by DJ Official and Alex Medina
- Released: December 26, 2012
- Genre: Christian hip hop
- Label: Reach Records
- Producers: Alex Medina; Big Juice; Black Knight; D-Flow; DJ Official; GAWVI; Tyshane

On December 26, 2012, DJ Official and Alex Medina released a remix version of the album, Gravity: The Remix EP, as a free digital download. It features the producers Gawvi (formerly known as G-Styles), Big Juice, D-Flow, Black Knight, and Tyshane.

=== Track listing ===
No.	Title	Remixing producer	Length
1.	"The Drop (Intro)"	Alex Medina	1:49
2.	"Free From It All" (featuring Mathai)	Black Knight	4:24
3.	"Fallin' Down" (featuring Trip Lee & Swoope)	Black Knight	5:11
4.	"Fakin'" (featuring Thi'sl)	DJ Official	3:59
5.	"Violence"	Alex Medina	3:00
6.	"Mayday" (featuring Big K.R.I.T. & Ashthon Jones)	Big Juice	4:40
7.	"Confe$$ions"	Gawvi	3:17
8.	"Buttons"	D-Flow	4:01
9.	"Power Trip" (featuring Derek Minor, Sho Baraka & Andy Mineo)	Alex Medina	3:51
10.	"Power Trip" (featuring Derek Minor, Sho Baraka & Andy Mineo)	Gawvi	4:17
11.	"Lord Have Mercy" (featuring Tedashii)	DJ Official	4:12
12.	"I Know"	DJ Official	3:35
13.	"Tell the World" (featuring Mali Music)	Tyshane	3:49

== Personnel ==
=== Performance ===
- Lecrae – primary artist

==== Featured artists ====
- Sho Baraka
- Big K.R.I.T.
- Rudy Currence
- Ashthon Jones
- J.R.
- Trip Lee
- Andy Mineo
- Mali Music
- Mathai
- Novel
- Pro
- Swoope
- Tedashii
- Thi'sl

==== Additional vocals ====
- Tasha Catour
- Michael Jefferson
- Elidaysi Medina
- Jennifer Rosa
- Bradley Tomlinson

==== Instrumentation ====
- Rudy Currence – keyboards
- Jeremy Ezell – French horn, string arrangements
- Chin Injeti – bass, guitar
- Danny Keyz – keyboard
- DJ Khalil – keyboards
- Tyler Rohn – keyboards
- Phillip Guillory – keyboards
- Danika Lukasiewicz – strings
- Joseph Lukasiewicz – string arrangements
- Ford Clay – guitar
- Joseph Prielozny – string arrangements
- Rahki – drums
- Nate Robinson – drums
- Paul "DJ Jon Juan" Strickland – scratching

=== Production and engineering ===
- Jeremiah Adkins – engineer
- Dru Castro – engineer, producer
- Zach Crowell – engineer, producer
- Rudy Currence – producer
- Dirty Rice – producer
- Tyler Rohn – Producer
- DJ Khalil – producer
- D.J. Official – producer
- Uforo Ebong – producer
- Hayden Flack – engineer
- Morgan Garcia – engineer
- Heat Academy – producer
- John Horesco IV – mastering
- J.R. – producer
- Trip Lee – engineer
- Big K.R.I.T. – engineer
- C.J. Luzi – programming
- Carlton Lynn – engineer, mixing, post-production
- Tom Malkowitz – engineer
- Andy Mineo – additional production
- Jacob "Biz" Morris – engineer, post-production
- Kevin Morris – engineer
- Lincoln Morris – engineer, vocal producer
- Alec Newell – engineer
- Joseph Prielozny – engineer, post-production, producer
- Pro – additional production
- Kerwin Richards – engineer
- Rob "DNA" Rivera – engineer
- Robin Ghosh – engineer
- Swoope – engineer
- Thainnacircle – producer
- Travis Tyler – engineer
- Tyshane – producer
- The Watchmen – producer
- Latasha Williams – engineer

=== Additional composition ===
- Ruperd Currence
- Solomon Burke
- Pran Injeti
- Jenny Norlin
- Natalie Sims
- Lincoln Rivera
- Daniel Tannebaum
- Gene Thornton
- Columbus T-Smith
- Travis Tyler
- Latasha Williams
- Phillip Guillory

=== Packaging ===
- Zack Arias – photography

=== Artists and repertoire ===
- Torrance "Street Symphony" Esmond
- Joseph Prielozny

== Charts ==
=== Weekly charts ===
Chart (2012–2013)	Peak position
Canadian Albums (Billboard)	24
New Zealand Albums (RMNZ)	16
US Billboard 200	3
US Top Christian Albums (Billboard)	1
US Independent Albums (Billboard)	1
US Top Rap Albums (Billboard)	1

=== Year-end charts ===
Chart (2012)	Position
US Billboard 200	197
US Christian Albums (Billboard)	7
Chart (2013)	Position
US Christian Albums (Billboard)	12

== Certifications ==
Region	Certification	Certified units/sales
United States (RIAA)	Gold	500,000^{‡}
^{‡} Sales+streaming figures based on certification alone.
