= Instruments of Mercy =

Studio album by Beautiful Eulogy
- Released: October 29, 2013
- Recorded: 2012–2013
- Genre: Christian hip hop, electronic, experimental hip hop, folk, indie
- Length: 47:13
- Label: Humble Beast
- Producer: Beautiful Eulogy

Beautiful Eulogy chronology
Satellite Kite (2012)	Instruments of Mercy (2013)

Singles from Instruments of Mercy
- 1. "Vital Lens" Released: September 10, 2013

Instruments of Mercy is the second studio album by Portland, Oregon-based experimental hip hop trio Beautiful Eulogy, released through Humble Beast Records on October 29, 2013, in both free and commercial format. Like its predecessor, the album features a highly eclectic folk-hip hop fusion melded with numerous other styles such as electronic, indie, hymn tunes, and contemporary worship music. Courtland Urbano, the main producer of the trio, eschewed the use of digitally-generated effects and instrumentation in composing the music for Instruments of Mercy, instead relying solely on analog and natural sounds. A single from the album, "Vital Lens", was released as a digital download on September 10, 2013. The album fared well commercially, charting at No. 6 on the Billboard Top Gospel Albums chart, and was lauded by critics for its diverse and creative sound and deeply theological lyrics. PQ Monthly called the group "one [of] the most innovative hip-hop acts in Portland."

The song Exile Dial Tone is featured on the 2016 motion picture soundtrack God's Not Dead 2.

== Background, recording, and instrumentation ==
Beautiful Eulogy was formed by rappers Braille and Odd Thomas and producer Courtland Urbano in 2011. The trio contributed a track to the charity album King Kulture in 2012, and featured as guest performers on the song "Misconception" by Lecrae from his 2012 Church Clothes mixtape. In the fall of the same year, Beautiful Eulogy released its debut album, Satellite Kite, to critical acclaim.

The trio revealed in an interview on October 28, 2013 that, due to their touring schedule and Braille and Odd Thomas's responsibilities as the owners of Humble Beast, they were delayed in completing their second album. For the recording, they stayed within the basic sound exhibited on Satellite Kite. Courtland Urbano in an interview stated that he personally dislikes an artist drastically changing style from their first to second album. However, the group did try to build upon and progress from its previous work. On Instruments of Mercy, Urbano avoided computer generated sounds entirely, instead using only live instrumentation, analog synthesizers, and natural found sounds. The album features sound effects such as dripping water, dial tones, wind chimes, rain, chirping birds, footsteps, and rustling leaves, and instrumentation such as electric and acoustic guitar, tambourine, drums, xylophone, piano, keyboard, strings, and glockenspiel.

== Release and promotion ==
In preparation for Instruments of Mercy's release in October, Beautiful Eulogy released a music video for the song "Vital Lens" on August 20, 2013. The song itself was released as a single on September 10, 2013. The album came out on October 29, 2013, in both commercial format and as a free downloadon NoiseTrade. A second music video, for the song "Release Me from This Snare", was released on November 21, 2013, and a third video, "Symbols and Signs", featuring Humble Beast label-mate Propaganda, came out on February 19, 2014. On December 17, 2013, Instruments of Mercy was followed up by a compilation album, Instrumentals of Mercy, containing the instrumentals to each track from the album.

== Reception ==
=== Critical ===
Professional ratings
Review scores
Source	Rating
The Christian Manifesto	5/5 stars
Christian Music Zine	5/5
HM	4.5/5 stars
Indie Vision Music	5/5 stars
Jesus Freak Hideout	5/5 stars
Rapzilla	3.5/5 stars

Instruments of Mercy met with a universally positive reception from critics, with The Christian Manifesto, Christian Music Zine, Indie Vision Music, and Jesus Freak Hideout all giving the album a perfect score. Nick Mattos of the Portland-based LGBTQ newspaper PQ Monthly glowingly reported: "Make no mistake, Beautiful Eulogy is a very religious bunch — and they're also one of the most innovative hip-hop acts in Portland."

Michael Wildes from The Christian Manifesto lavished praise upon the album's unorthodox production and theologically deep, highly skilled lyricism. He wrote that "it's hard to talk about such a creative album and do it the justice it deserves", and commented of the album's production that "Talking about organic, your mother's favorite gardening tools can be heard making rhythms and beats on this number." Christian Music Zine's Anthony Peronto praised the chemistry and group dynamic between Beautiful Eulogy's three members. He concluded that

With nary a flaw to be found and undeniable growth by each member, Beautiful Eulogy have exceeded all expectations and delivered their best work yet. Though I want to resist repeating my thoughts on Beautiful Eulogy's debut album I can't say it any other way than this slight paraphrasing: This is the most musically creative hip hop album I've heard since, well... Satellite Kite.

Jessica Cooper of Indie Vision Music summarized that

All of Instruments of Mercy is fresh in sound, featuring loops of new beats and sounds that stick to the lyrics like glue. Beautiful Eulogy continues to be consistent in their collaborative works and are undoubtedly blessed with the words and musical talent to produce something that's cohesive, poetic, and undeniably beautiful from beginning to end.

Jesus Freak Hideout's Mark Rice praised the rapping skills of Odd Thomas and Braille, Courtland Urbano's production, and the lyrical focus of the album. He remarked that "It is hard not to marvel at the sheer talent of these three individuals, whether it is in the crisp vocals, wonderful production, or the dense and theologically provoking lyrics." Jamie Lee Rake, writing for HM, rated the album four-and-a-half stars out of five, complimenting Beautiful Eulogy for its incisive theological commentary, inventive musical skills, and left-field pop sensibility. He also noted that "Amid a nigh wholly satisfying 14 tracks, they even manage to better Eminem at his 'Stan' plan of matching penetrating rhymes to soaring female choruses." Rapzilla's Nyon Smith likewise praised the group's strongly theological lyrics and experimental production, rating the album three-and-a-half out of five stars and writing that

While the overall mix of Beautiful Eulogy's debut, Satellite Kite, was good, their sophomore effort (when listened to on decent headphones/speakers) throws the listener into a supernatural auditory environment. From every pluck of a string to each tap of the glockenspiel the album has a majestic feel, seeking to demonstrate the beauty of God Himself.

Roxanne Kumalo from Christian Today considered the album "the most uplifting gospel centred album of 2013" and began her review with the comment "Those fortunate enough to be well acquainted with the refreshing musical and ministerial giftings in the work of Beautiful Eulogy will, I am sure, unite with me in this proclamation: this group is completely out of this world and unlike anything I have ever heard before!" Aubrey McKay expressed in his review for Wade-O Radio that the recording transcends labels such as "classic" or "stellar", revealing that "this record fundamentally changed my life and relationship with music."

=== Commercial ===
Though a free version of the album was released through NoiseTrade, Instruments of Mercy fared well commercially. It charted at No. 6 on the Billboard Top Gospel, and No. 21 on the Top Christian.

== Style and lyrics ==
On Instruments of Mercy, Beautiful Eulogy exhibited a fusion of folk and hip hop music mixed with electronic, indie, hymn tunes, contemporary worship music, and spoken word passages. Michael Wildes The Christian Manifesto noted that "lyrically a hip-hip album, it is rich in folk, electronic and indie inspired music with a feel of the Portland environment, complemented by the natural elements of that city." He further explained that many songs sounded more like worship music than hip-hop. Christian Today considered the electronic facet of the group "the glue, effortlessly synchronising the cocktail which is to be found in the instrumentation of their music." However, they further noted that "The style [Beautiful Eulogy] have adopted in their quest to present absolute truths found in the Word of God cannot be pocketed, yet tends to gravitate between a generic rap style and spoken word." HM's Jamie Lee Rake described that album as "alt like crazy", with "musical textures to draw heads deep in their given genre, as well as neo-folkies and aficionados of downtempo EDM", and that Beautiful Eulogy also "venture to reinvent hip-house, albeit in a more glitchy manner." Several critics highlighted "Blessed are the Merciful", which consists of a three-minute sermon clip from Art Azurdia backed by instrumental music.

Lyrically, the trio explore Christian theology and how to live out one's faith. While the group explores numerous Christian doctrines and life struggles, every song ties in with the album's theme of the sinfulness and total depravity of humanity, and the endless mercy and grace of God toward sinners and the hope that Christians can find in God.

== Track listing ==
No.	Title	Length
1.	"Cello from Portland"	2:29
2.	"Vital Lens"	2:57
3.	"Exile Dial Tone"	4:08
4.	"The Size of Sin"	1:48
5.	"You Can Save Me" (featuring Marz)	4:46
6.	"Instruments of Mercy" (featuring Hello Abigail)	4:14
7.	"Symbols and Signs" (featuring Propaganda)	3:43
8.	"Blessed Are the Merciful" (with Art Azurdia)	3:00
9.	"Release Me From This Snare"	3:35
10.	"Organized Religion" (featuring Jackie Hill and Eshon Burgundy)	2:57
11.	"According to God" (featuring Joseph)	3:46
12.	"Raise the Bridge"	2:06
13.	"The Size of Grace"	2:22
14.	"Acquired in Heaven" (featuring Josh White)	5:22

== Charts ==
Chart (2013)	Peak position
US Christian Albums (Billboard)	21
US Top Gospel Albums (Billboard)	6
