= Beautiful Eulogy =

American hip hop group

- Origin: Portland, Oregon, U.S.
- Genres: Christian hip hop, folk music, experimental hip hop, electronic
- Years active: 2011–present
- Label: Humble Beast
- Members: Braille; Odd Thomas; Courtland Urbano
- Website: humblebeast.com/music/beautiful-eulogy

Beautiful Eulogy is a Christian experimental hip hop group and production team from Portland, Oregon, signed to the label Humble Beast. Composed of rappers Braille (Bryan Winchester) and Odd Thomas (Thomas Terry) and producer Courtland Urbano, the group coalesced in 2011 while the three artists were involved in the creation of Braille's seventh release, Native Lungs. Known for its experimental and eclectic sound, the group melds myriad styles of hip hop with genres such as folk, electronic, hymn tunes, and modern worship music. After contributing a song to the charity compilation King Kulture and making a guest appearance on Lecrae's Church Clothes, the band released its debut album, Satellite Kite, on June 19, 2012. A second album, Instruments of Mercy, came out on October 29, 2013. Called one of the most innovative hip hop groups in Portland, Beautiful Eulogy has met with critical acclaim, with particular praise directed at the group's creative, unconventional sound and deep theological lyrics.

== History ==
Beautiful Eulogy formed during the recording sessions of rapper Braille's seventh studio album Native Lungs and Odd Thomas's planned second studio album Satellite Kite. After Courtland Urbano agreed to produce Odd Thomas's planned album, the two traveled to Denver, Colorado, to help produce Braille's album. The two wanted to form a production team, and during discussions over an interlude for Native Lungs, they came up with the name "Beautiful Eulogy." Thomas and Urbano returned to Portland and began working on the album art and production for Satellite Kite. At this juncture, Braille and Thomas, owners of the Humble Beast record label, realized that they could not run their label while working as separate artists in different parts of the country. This, combined with Braille's decision to not make an eighth solo studio album, led the three artists decided to combine their efforts, and Beautiful Eulogy was born.

Beautiful Eulogy first appeared on Christian hip hop website Rapzilla's charity compilation King Kulture, released January 31, 2012, on which the trio, along with fellow Humble Beast members Theory Hazit and Lee Green, performed the title track. The group next appeared along with Propaganda and DJ Efechto on the Lecrae song "Misconception" from the mixtape Church Clothes. This track garnered much critical praise, with some reviewers considering it one of the best tracks from the mixtape. On June 19, 2012, Beautiful Eulogy released its debut album, Satellite Kite, in both a commercial format and a free download off NoiseTrade. The album garnered much critical acclaim, with reviewers praising the album's innovation, deep, theologically complex lyricism, skilled rapping, and creative and unconventional production. Beautiful Eulogy also featured on the song "Restore my Vision (Pluck My Eyes Out!)" by Timothy Brindle on The Restoration, released on July 24, 2012.

On August 20, 2013, Beautiful Eulogy released a music video for the song "Vital Lens" from its upcoming second studio album, Instruments of Mercy, and on September 10, 2013, "Vital Lens" was released as a single. Instruments of Mercy was released on October 29, 2013, in both commercial and free download format, and, like its predecessor, was met with critical acclaim. PQ Monthly called the trio one of the most innovative hip hop groups in Portland. A second music video, "Release Me from This Snare", was released on November 21, 2013. Their third video, "Symbols and Signs", was released on February 19, 2014.

== Style ==
Beautiful Eulogy performs a hybrid, experimental form of hip hop that draws from genres such as folk, electronic, hymn tunes, and contemporary worship music. On Satellite Kite, Courtland Urbano explored styles including boom bap, R&B, industrial, electro-hip hop, soul, and indie rock. Rapzilla highlighted some of the unconventional sounds used by Urbano, such as dripping water, wind, and harmonica. Sphere of Hip Hop compared the experimental and electronic style of the album's beats to Flying Lotus and the Brainfeeder label. On Instruments of Mercy, Urbano used entirely analog and natural sounds, with the electronic sounds on the album created by analog synthesizer instead of by a computer. Stylistically, on this album the group continued to draw from and folk, electronic, and indie, and reviewers stated that it sounded almost more like a worship album than a hip-hop recording. For this recording, the group used sound affects such as dripping water, dial tones, wind chimes, rain, chirping birds, footsteps, and rustling leaves, and instruments such as electric and acoustic guitar, tambourine, drums, xylophone, piano, keyboard, strings, and glockenspiel. HM stated that the album "has musical textures to draw heads deep in their given genre, as well as neo-folkies and aficionados of downtempo EDM." The magazine further elaborated that the group surpasses even Eminem at matching penetrating rhymes to soaring female choruses, ventures to "reinvent hip-house, albeit in a more glitchy manner", and "manages the tricky triptych of doctrinal/theological incisiveness, inventive musical engagement and, were this a better world, a left-field pop sensibility that could allow these fellas share pop radio time with Jay-Z and Flo Rida while shaming them with intelligent spitting."

== Discography ==
=== Studio albums ===
- Satellite Kite - 2012
- Instruments of Mercy - 2013
- Worthy - 2017

=== Collaborative albums ===
2012	Rapzilla Presents... King Kulture (various artists): Charity album; Released: January 31, 2012; Label: Rapzilla; Contributing track: "King Kulture" (featuring Theory Hazit and Lee Green)

=== Singles ===
- "Vital Lens" - 2013

=== Music videos ===
- "Vital Lens" - 2013
- "Release Me from this Snare" - 2013
- "Symbols and Signs" - 2014

=== Guest appearances ===
Title	Year	Other performer(s)	Album
"Misconception"	2012	Lecrae, Propaganda, DJ Efechto	Church Clothes
"Restore My Vision (Pluck My Eyes Out!)"	2012	Timothy Brindle	The Restoration
"Lofty"	2012	Propaganda, Joel Davis	Excellent
"Supreme"	2017	Shai Linne	Still Jesus

== Production discography ==
- Propaganda - Excellent
- Propaganda - Crimson Cord
- Jackie Hill Perry - The Art of Joy (alongside TheBridge)
- Foreknown - Ornithology (produces "Rebooted", "Double Tap", "The Truth About Flight, Love and BB Guns (feat. Catalina Bellizzi) & "Little Miss So & So"
- Eshon Burgundy – The Fear of God
