= Satellite Kite =

Studio album by Beautiful Eulogy
- Released: June 19, 2012
- Recorded: 2011–2012
- Genre: Christian hip hop, experimental hip hop, folk music
- Length: 48:08
- Label: Humble Beast
- Producer: Beautiful Eulogy

Beautiful Eulogy chronology
Satellite Kite (2012)	Instruments of Mercy (2013)

Satellite Kite is the debut album by the Portland, Oregon-based experimental hip hop trio Beautiful Eulogy, released through Humble Beast Records in both commercial and free formats on June 19, 2012. The album was praised for its eclectic and heavily folk-influenced sound, unconventional production, highly skilled rapping, and deep theological lyrics.

== Background ==
Beautiful Eulogy consists of rappers Braille and Odd Thomas, who co-own Humble Beast Records, and producer Courtland Urbano, formerly known as Xperiment. The group coalesced during the recording session of Braille's seventh studio album Native Lungs and Odd Thomas's planned second studio album Satellite Kite. After Courtland Urbano agreed to produce Odd Thomas's planned album, the two traveled to Denver, Colorado, to help produce Braille's album. The pair wanted to form a production team, and during discussions over an interlude for Native Lungs, they came up with the name "Beautiful Eulogy." Thomas and Urbano returned to Portland and began working on the album art and production for Satellite Kite. At this juncture, Braille and Thomas, owners of the Humble Beast record label, realized that they could not run their label while working as separate artists in different parts of the country. This, combined with Braille's decision to not make an eighth solo studio album, led the three artists decided to combine their efforts, and Beautiful Eulogy was born.

The group first appeared on Christian hip hop website Rapzilla's charity compilation King Kulture, released January 31, 2013, on which the trio, along with fellow Humble Beast members Theory Hazit and Lee Green, performed the title track. The group next appeared along with labelmates Propaganda and DJ Efechto on the Lecrae song "Misconception" from the mixtape Church Clothes.

== Release and promotion ==
The track listing for Satellite Kite was revealed on May 29, 2012. To promote the album, Beautiful Eulogy released a music video for a shortened version of the song "Entitlement" on June 5, 2012. The album was released on June 19, 2012, as both a purchasable commercial album and a free download through the website Noisetrade. The commercial version of the album features a digital booklet containing the lyrics and "a brief paragraph written about each song’s origin, composition or meaning."

== Critical reception ==
Professional ratings
Review scores
Source	Rating
Christian Music Zine	4.5/5
Indie Vision Music	5/5 stars
Jesus Freak Hideout	5/5 stars 4/5 stars
Rapzilla	4/5 stars

Satellite Kite met with critical acclaim, with critics praising in particular its eclectic, innovative sound and diverse production, finely executed rapping, and its deep, theologically based lyrical content. Anthony Peronto of Christian Music Zine scored the album four-and-a-half out of five, concluding that it was "the most musically creative hip hop album I've heard in a long time. The emcees kill their verses and the production is phenomenal. Satellite Kite is a near perfect album that should be owned by those you want creativity and art in their hip hop." Jessica Cooper of Indie Vision Music bestowed the album with a perfect score, noting that she was personally challenged by many of the lyrics on the album. She also praised the production by Courtland Urbano stating that he "does a great job creating a specific atmosphere for each track: ethereal, outer spacey, club mix, watery, one sounds like someone flipping through a deck of cards really fast. The range of effects used throughout is what makes it really interesting, in comparison to a lot of hip hop nowadays because you can tell when one track ends and another begins."

Scott Fryberger of Jesus Freak Hideout also rated the album a perfect five stars. He devoted much of his praise to the rapping by Braille and Odd Thomas, praising their versatility in their flow and noting how they could seamlessly switch vocals between each other and even rap simultaneously. Fryberger exclaimed that "It's rather amazing how good Satellite Kite is." He elaborated that "a lot of times these days, when an album gets hyped up so much, it more often than not leads to disappointment... ...if you've heard anything great about this trio, believe it." Michael Weaver of Jesus Freak Hideout rated the album four stars out of five, singling out the album's unusual production and lyrical content and summarizing that "While the sounds of Satellite Kite won't be for every rap or hip-hop fan, the lyrical flow and message are alone worth a listen." David Kincannon of Rapzilla rated the album a four out of five, praising the diverse production and carefully executed rapping, writing that Braille and Odd Thomas have "the ability to go machine gun with their flows and spit out words with a crisp diction that makes every single word clear", but can "also slow it down to fit the mood of the track and the subject of the song." Josh Niemyjski of Sphere of Hip Hop highly praised the album, concluding that "Some might find Satellite Kite an awkward listen due to its revolutionary and ground-breaking combination of production and rap styles; others will relish this for exactly the same reasons. As with all Humble Beast’s releases it can be gotten for free so you are at liberty to make your own decision." Wade-O Radio's David Aubrey acclaimed the album, praising Beautiful Eulogy's lyricism, production, and group dynamic. He concluded that

Whether conscious, 'backpack', or lyrical hip-hop is your steez, what Beautiful Eulogy was able to create with this record should be respected. This is hip-hop in its truest form; artistic expression through beats and rhymes. It was made beautiful through the passion, creativity and talent that was presented to us. It was beautiful because they stayed true to themselves and made music that came from their heart. Simply said it was beautiful because it was art. Beautiful art.

— David Aubrey

== Charting ==
Satellite Kite charted at No. 49 on the Billboard Top Gospel Albums chart.

== Style and instrumentation ==
Beautiful Eulogy performs a hybrid, experimental form of hip hop that draws from genres such as folk, electronic, hymn tunes, and contemporary worship music. On Satellite Kite, Courtland Urbano explores styles including boom bap, R&B, industrial, electro-hip hop, soul, and indie rock. The track "Anchor", featuring Josh Garrels, blends the group's hip-hop with "aquatic soul" and "Beautiful Eulogy" was described as "a Future of Forestry worship song mixed with hip hop." Josh Niemyski compared the "electronic, bleepy, experimental-type production" to the output by Flying Lotus and the Brainfeeder label.

The album, unlike most hip-hop recordings, features a mostly down-tempo, laid-back production. Michael Weaver of Jesus Freak Hideout proclaimed the album to be "one of the most relaxed and laid back hip-hop albums you can find". He elaborated that "The sounds and beats will not strike one as "normal" for the hip-hop realm, but then again who is to say what's normal? Instead, what the listener gets is an interesting fusion of folk and hip-hop from producer Courtland Urbano." Scott Fryberger found Urbano's production style comparable only to Trent Reznor, noting that the beats on Satellite Kite have an industrial flair that hip hop heads don't hear too often." Some tracks feature a cappella elements, such as the otherwise boom-bap song "Wonderful", or "Covet", which features gang vocals and hand claps. Urbano's production on the album makes use of a wide range of instruments and found sounds unusual to the hip hop genre, with Rapzilla mentioning the use water drops, wind, and "soulful, almost avant-garde harmonica."

== Track listing ==
No.	Title	Length
1.	"Hello from Portland"	2:16
2.	"An Open Letter to Whoever's Listening"	3:35
3.	"Covet"	4:04
4.	"Take it Easy" (featuring Catalina Bellizzi)	4:09
5.	"The String that Ties Us"	2:29
6.	"Entitlement"	3:33
7.	"Anchor" (featuring Josh Garrels)	5:37
8.	"Satellite Kite"	3:52
9.	"Wonderful" (featuring Propaganda)	3:58
10.	"Motive 1, 2"	4:03
11.	"A Bridge Between"	1:44
12.	"Surrender" (featuring Lee Green)	4:50
13.	"Beautiful Eulogy"	4:38
