= The Fear of God (Eshon Burgundy album) =

Studio album by Eshon Burgundy
- Released: March 3, 2015
- Genre: Christian hip hop
- Length: 52:34
- Label: Humble Beast
- Producer: Beautiful Eulogy, Daniel Steele, Street Orchestra, Swoope, Wit

Eshon Burgundy chronology
Blood Rushing to My Head (2012)	The Fear of God (2015)	The Passover (2016)

The Fear of God is the second album from Eshon Burgundy. Humble Beast Records released the project on March 3, 2015. It was produced with the help of Beautiful Eulogy, Daniel Steele, Street Orchestra, Swoope and Wit.

== Reception ==
Professional ratings
Review scores
Source	Rating
Jesus Freak Hideout	4.5/5 stars
New Release Tuesday	4/5 stars

Michael Weaver, specifying in a four and a half star review from Jesus Freak Hideout, replied: "The Fear of God is a crowning achievement in Eshon Burgundy's still young career, and another great album from the Humble Beast family". In a four-star review by New Release Tuesday, Dwayne Lacy wrote: "This album screams hip hop and boom bap, pointing you to Christ in a very overt way." Aubery McKay, for Wado-O Radio, said: "His delivery and flawless lyricism could win anyone over and is worth being heard by many."

== Track listing ==
No.	Title	Writer(s)	Producer(s)	Length
1.	"The Fear of God"	Anton Eshon Hairston, Elvin Shahbazian	Street Orchestra, Wit	2:34
2.	"Healthy" (featuring Je'kob)	A. Hairston, Je'Kob Washington, Bryan Winchester, Thomas Terry, Courtland Urbano	Beautiful Eulogy	4:09
3.	"Blood Money"	A. Hairston, Daniel Steele	Daniel Steele	4:21
4.	"Higher Learning" (featuring Uncle Reece)	A. Hairston, Maurice Hicks, Jr., D. Steele	Daniel Steele	3:52
5.	"Control Issues" (featuring Daniel Steele)	A. Hairston, D. Steele, B. Winchester, T. Terry, C. Urbano	Beautiful Eulogy, Daniel Steele	3:33
6.	"Respect, Power & $" (featuring John Givez)	A. Hairston, John Givens, D. Steele	Daniel Steele	3:43
7.	"The Fear of the Lord" (featuring Shai Linne)	Shai Linne, D. Steele	Daniel Steele	2:43
8.	"Come Alive" (featuring JGivens, Courtney Orlando & Tandeance)	A. Hairston, Jeremiah Givens, Zara Hairston, Courtney Peebles, Lawrence Swoope II, E. Shahbazian	Swoope, Wit	7:18
9.	"Certified Gold"	A. Hairston, L. Swoope II, E. Shahbazian, B. Winchester	Swoope, Wit, Braille	3:48
10.	"Sand Castles" (featuring Sean C. Johnson)	A. Hairston, Sean Johnson, D. Steele	Daniel Steele	3:28
11.	"Good Grief" (featuring Liz Vice)	A. Hairston, Elizabeth Vice, B. Winchester, T. Terry, C. Urbano, E. Shahbazian	Beautiful Eulogy, Wit	4:51
12.	"Retro Sonday" (featuring Braille)	A. Hairston, B. Winchester, D. Steele, C. Urbano, T. Terry	Beautiful Eulogy, Daniel Steele	3:58
13.	"A Close Distance" (featuring Lee Green)	A. Hairston, Lee Green, D. Steele	Daniel Steele	4:16
Total length:				52:34

== Chart performance ==
Chart (2015)	Peak position
US Christian Albums (Billboard)	15
US Heatseekers Albums (Billboard)	4
US Independent Albums (Billboard)	25
US Top Rap Albums (Billboard)	20
