= Crimson Cord =

Album by Propaganda

Studio album by Propaganda
- Released: April 29, 2014
- Genre: Christian hip hop, spoken word
- Length: 45:54
- Label: Humble Beast
- Producer: Beautiful Eulogy

Propaganda chronology
Excellent (2012)	Crimson Cord (2014)	Crooked (2017)

Crimson Cord is the fifth studio album from Christian hip hop recording artist Propaganda. The album was produced by Beautiful Eulogy and released by Humble Beast Records on April 29, 2014. It met with commercial and critical success.

== Recording and release ==
Crimson Cord was produced by the hip-hop trio Beautiful Eulogy. It was released on April 29, 2014. Prior to the album's release, Propaganda released a music video for the title track on April 8, 2014.

== Critical reception ==
Professional ratings
Review scores
Source	Rating
AllMusic	4/5 stars
Christian Music Zine	5/5 stars
Cross Rhythms	9/10 squares
Jesus Freak Hideout	4/5 stars 4.5/5 stars
New Release Tuesday	4.5/5 stars

Crimson Cord met with positive reception from music critics. Timothy Monger of AllMusic rated the album four stars out of five, indicating how Propaganda "aims to inspire by simply producing good art." At Jesus Freak Hideout, Michael Weaver gave the album four out of five stars, while Mark Rice and Scott Fryberger gave it four-and-a-half stars. Weaver stated that "Crimson Cord is a deep and thought-provoking experience," and Rice wrote that "Crimson Cord features some equally mind-bending raps and spoken work pieces". Fryberger said that the album contains "the same quality fans have come to expect" because it "takes you through a fair dosage of beat-driven tracks as well as poetry-with-beats".

Dwayne Lacy of New Release Tuesday rated the album four-and-a-half stars out of five, remarking on how Propaganda's albums come with a vast array of information to be gleaned out of his music, and that his message comes across with "much reality and relevance when presenting the Gospel." At Christian Music Zine, Anthony Peronto rated the album a perfect five stars, remarking that "there is many a-pleasure to be had examining Crimson Cord." Aubrey McKay of Wade-O Radio considered the album a "must have" for every Christian hip hop fan, and expressed that "Everything from the album cover art to the concept of the album was beautiful artistry."

== Chart performance ==
For the Billboard charting week of May 17, 2014, Crimson Cord charted at No. 55 on the Billboard 200, No. 5 and 2 on the Christian Albums and Top Gospel Albums charts, respectively, No. 8 on the Rap Albums, and No. 13 on the Independent Albums chart.

== Track listing ==
Tracklist (Note: According to the iTunes digital album booklet)
No.	Title	Writer(s)	Length
1.	"You Mock Me"	Jason Petty, Thomas Joseph Terry, Courtland Urbano, Bryan Winchester	2:36
2.	"Crimson Cord"	Petty, Terry, Urbano, Winchester	4:03
3.	"Daywalkers" (featuring Lecrae)	Petty, Lecrae Moore, Terry, Urbano, Winchester	3:04
4.	"Make"	Petty, Terry, Urbano, Winchester	2:39
5.	"Bored of Education"	Petty, Terry, Urbano, Winchester	4:47
6.	"Thanks Rev"	Petty, Terry, Urbano, Winchester	1:55
7.	"I Ain't Gave Up on You Yet"	Petty, Terry, Urbano, Winchester	3:42
8.	"Framed Stretch Marks" (featuring Derek Webb and Braille)	Petty, Terry, Urbano, Winchester	3:38
9.	"I Don't See It"	Petty, Terry, Urbano, Winchester	3:16
10.	"Three Cord Bond"	Petty, Terry, Urbano, Winchester	4:28
11.	"How Did We Get Here" (featuring Andy Mineo and JGivens)	Perry, Jeremiah Givens, Andy Mineo, Terry, Urbano, Winchester	3:30
12.	"Redeem" (featuring Lee Green)	Petty, Lee Green, Terry, Urbano, Winchester	4:28
13.	"Tell Me Yours"	Petty, Terry, Urbano, Winchester	3:48
Total length:			45:54

iTunes edition bonus track
No.	Title	Writer(s)	Length
14.	"Make (Remix)"	Petty, Terry, Urbano, Winchester	2:30

== Chart performance ==
Chart (2014)	Peak position
US Billboard 200	55
US Christian Albums (Billboard)	5
US Top Gospel Albums (Billboard)	2
US Independent Albums (Billboard)	13
US Top Rap Albums (Billboard)	8
