= Give It to Me =

Give It to Me or Give It 2 Me may refer to:

- Give It to Me (album) or the title song, by Sistar, 2013
- "Give It to Me" (Mobb Deep song), 2006
- "Give It to Me" (Timbaland song), 2007
- "Give It to Me" (The J. Geils Band song), 1973
- "Give It to Me" (The Troggs song), 1967
- "Give It 2 Me", by Madonna, 2008
- "I Just Wanna Love U (Give It 2 Me)", by Jay-Z, 2000
- "Give It to Me", by 2PM from Hands Up, 2011
- "Give It to Me", by 3 Doors Down from 3 Doors Down, 2008
- "Give It to Me", by Jason Derulo from Future History, 2011
- "Give It to Me", by Kylie Minogue from Fever, 2001
- "Give It to Me", by The Maine from Black & White, 2010
- "Give It to Me", by Patricia Paay, 1980
- "Give It to Me", by The Pioneers, 1968
- "Give It to Me", by Sheryl Crow from Feels Like Home, 2013
- "Give It to Me", by Sơn Tùng M-TP featuring Snoop Dogg, 2019
- "Give It to Me", by Stranger Cole, 1969
- "Give It to Me", by The Whispers from Just Gets Better with Time, 1987
- "Give It to Me", from the musical Let My People Come, 1974
- "Give It 2 Me", by Edem
- "Give It 2 Me", by Shihan featuring Propaganda, 2005
- "Give It 2 Me", by Shinhwa, 2015

== See also ==
- "Give It to Me Baby", a 1981 song by Rick James
- "Give It to Me Right", a 2009 song by Melanie Fiona
- "Give It Up to Me", a 2009 song by Shakira
- "(When You Gonna) Give It Up to Me", a 2006 song by Sean Paul
- "Give In to Me (disambiguation)
