= Fear of God (disambiguation) =

Fear of God refers to fear or a specific sense of respect, awe, and submission to a deity.

Fear of God may also refer to:

== Music ==
- Fear of God (band), an American extreme metal band
- Fear of God (The Bats album), 1991
- Fear of God (Deitiphobia album), 1991
- The Fear of God (Eshon Burgundy album), 2015
- The Fear of God (Showbread album), 2009
- Fear of God, a 2011 album by Pusha T
- Fear of God II: Let Us Pray, a 2011 EP by Pusha T

== Other uses ==
- Fear of God, an American streetwear label founded by Jerry Lorenzo
