= Give In to Me (disambiguation) =

"Give In to Me" is a song by American singer-songwriter Michael Jackson

Give In to Me may also refer to:

- "Give In to Me" (Faith Hill song)
- "Give In to Me" (Rogue Traders song)
- "Give In to Me", a song by Letters from the Fire from Worth the Pain

== See also ==
- Give It to Me (disambiguation)
