= Rudy Currence =

American singer, songwriter, producer, keyboardist

- Born: Rock Hill, South Carolina, United States
- Other name: Rudy
- Education: Furman University
- Musical career
- Genres: R&B; gospel; soul
- Occupations: Singer; songwriter; producer; keyboardist
- Label: Platinum Entertainment / Mike Chek Entertainment / Disturbing tha Peace

Rudy Currence, also known as early 2000s R&B act "Rudy", is an American singer, songwriter, producer, and keyboardist, best known for co-writing "Sophisticated Lady" for Mya's album Moodring, Grammy-nominated "Sunday A.M" for Karen Clark Sheard's 2015 album Destined to Win, and his 2020 Gospel single "I Belong Here" that peaked at #1 on the Billboard Gospel Airplay Chart. Trained in classical and jazz piano, Currence recently secured an endorsement deal with Kawai Musical Instruments.

== Personal life ==
Born in Rock Hill, South Carolina, Currence is the son of a preacher who embraced many different genres of music, creating a religious household that often listened to Motown, Prince, The Bee Gees, and The Carpenters alongside gospel standards. This led to Currence and his siblings singing the national anthem at Charlotte Hornets games, which raised their profile in the region. They would later compete and win on Showtime at the Apollo, the TV show hosted by Steve Harvey at the historic Apollo Theater in Harlem.

Currence is a 2002 Graduate of the Furman University Classical Music program. He recently received the key to the city of Greenville, South Carolina.

== Discography ==
Studio projects

- More Than You'll Ever Know (2003)
- Here With You (2006)
- Digital Analog (2016)
- Stained Glass Windows (2023)

=== Singles ===
List of singles, as a lead artist, with selected chart positions, showing year released and album name
Title	Year	Peak chart positions				Certifications	Album
Title	Year	US R&B	Hot Gospel Songs	Gospel Airplay	Gospel Digital	Certifications	Album
"Do It Like Us" (as "Rudy")	1999	113					
"Believe Me" (as "Rudy")	2002						Bourne Identity OST
"Cha Cha / Superstar"	2003						More Than You'll Ever Know
"Cry Wolf"	2004						The Urban Griot: Cold Blooded
"Send Me, I'll Go"	2016						
"Testimony"	2017		21	18			
"Love Lifted"	2018						
"#HOPE" (and Remix Featuring David Banner)	2020						
"I Belong Here"	2020		10	1	3		Stained Glass Windows
"No Greater Love" (With Chrisette Michele)	2022		16	1			Stained Glass Windows
"One Of These Days"	2022						Stained Glass Windows
"Ransom"	2023			11			Stained Glass Windows
"God Don't Cancel Me"	2024-26		14	1			

=== Guest appearances ===
List of guest appearances, with other performing artists, showing year released and album name
Title	Year	Other performer(s)	Album
"Soul Bossa Nostra"	2010	Quincy Jones, Ludacris & Naturally 7	Q Soul Bossa Nostra
"Nobody Wins a War"	2010	Jill Scott, Bilal, Anthony Hamilton, Algebra, Chrisette Michele, Shelby Johnson, Ledisi, Citizen Cope, Dwele, Chico DeBarge, Guile, & Norman Lutz	The Love & War MasterPeace
"Lucky Ones"	2012	Lecrae	Gravity
"Marry Me"	2017	David Banner	The God Box
"Christmas Pick Me Up"	2021	Raheem DeVaughn	Non-album single
"Shine"	2021	Mykal Star	Appear Small

== Songwriting, keyboard and production credits ==
Credits are courtesy of Discogs, Tidal, and AllMusic.

Title	Year	Artist	Album
"Sophisticated Lady"	2003	Mya	Moodring
"No Sleep Tonight"	2003	Mya	Moodring
"Let's Play House"	2005	Ray J	Raydiation
"Gravity" (Featuring J.R.)	2012	Lecrae	Gravity
"Walk With Me" (Featuring Novel)	2012	Lecrae	Gravity
"Paper Heart"	2013	Algebra	Recovery
"Sunday A.M."	2015	Karen Clark Sheard	Destined to Win
"Come By Here"	2021	Prince Tai	Non-album single

== Awards and nominations ==
Year	Ceremony	Award	Result	Ref
2013	44th GMA Dove Awards	Dove Award for Rap/Hip Hop Album of the Year (Gravity)	Won	
2015	57th Annual Grammy Awards	Grammy Award for Best Gospel Performance/Song (Sunday A.M.)	Nominated	
