= Mayday (Lecrae song) =

Song by Lecrae

Single by Lecrae featuring Big K.R.I.T. and Ashthon Jones

from the album Gravity
- Released: August 30, 2012
- Genre: Hip hop; R&B
- Length: 4:54
- Label: Reach Records
- Songwriters: Lecrae Moore; Justin Scott; Ashthon Jones; Lincoln Morris; Torrence Esmond; Khalil Abdul-Rahman; Pran Injeti; Columbus T-Smith; Daniel Tannenbaum
- Producers: DJ Khalil; Lincoln "Bar-None" Morris (vocal)

Lecrae singles chronology
"Tell the World" (2012)	"Mayday" (2012)	"Round of Applause" (2013)

Big K.R.I.T. singles chronology
"What U Mean" (2012)	"Mayday" (2012)	"Gossip" (2012)

Music video
- Video on YouTube

Audio sample
- The single received praise for its production work by DJ Khalil and the sung vocals by Ashthon Jones.: file; help

"Mayday" is a song by Christian hip hop recording artist Lecrae, featuring guest vocals from fellow American rapper Big K.R.I.T. and American Idol finalist Ashthon Jones. Released on August 30, 2012, it is the fourth single off the album Gravity, which was released on September 4, 2012. The song's lyrics focus on religion, spirituality, and the role of grandmothers in developing faith and stability. It features a confession by Big K.R.I.T in which he expresses frustration with Christian hypocrisy. The song has been well received by critics and is considered one of the best songs off the album, with the lush instrumental production by DJ Khalil and the vocals by Ashthon Jones attracting particular praise. Stylistically, "Mayday" is described as having both a very "raw" and "organic" sound and R&B flow, with "chaotic" and "funky" production.

== Lyrics and style ==
Lyrically, the song is based around a line where Big K.R.I.T. confesses his lack of church attendance and expresses frustration with church hypocrisy. In the second verse, Lecrae provide the solution to K.R.I.T.'s struggle and frustration. At a listening party for the album Gravity, Lecrae described the theme of the song as about "'those days when we’re just throwing up a prayer.'" iHipHop appreciated the approach of the song, stating that "when it comes to rap with a positive message, it’s quite difficult for most artist to pull it off without sounding all preachy, and for the lack of a better term, corny. Apart from Lupe Fiasco, Lecrae is one of the few cats that kicks real world raps and not sound like a preacher." HipHopWired also praised Lecrae for managing to speak "on that real without sounding entirely too preachy" and elaborated that this "is a feat in today's pseudo-conscious rap, where a lot of MC's say as they do and not do as they say." In a review for Day & A Dream, journalist Brando noted the performers evocation of their elders and stated how, especially in the Southern United States, grandmothers are "matriarchs to faith and stability and these two men know better than most to convey that message abroad."

AllHipHop stated that sonically, the song is the most "organic" track on the album. StupidDOPE said the track "brings back the raw hip-hop the industry seems to be in need of." NewReleaseTuesday noted the song's role in the sequencing on the album, stating that the song's smoother, R&B sound is a jarring transition from the dancehall vibe of the preceding track "Violence". The lush production style by DJ Khalil was described by Complex as "chaotic" and "funky", and StupidDOPE considered the beat "catchy". The Atlanta Journal-Constitution called the track a "massive song filled with crashing cymbals and thundering drums." Brando of Day & A Dream described the song as "soul wrenching" and "piano driven".

== Critical reception ==
After hearing Gravity at a private listening session, AllHipHop considered the song one of the standout tracks on the album. Rapzilla went further and said that the song is easily the best sonically, lyrically, and conceptually on the album. stupidDOPE praised Lecrae for "blending the heartfelt lyrics of the track with an awesome beat and undertone / melody." The rhymes by Big K.R.I.T. and Lecrae were described by HipHopWired as "perfectly fluid", with Ashthon Jones’ soulful vocals complementing the lush production work by DJ Khalil. AllHipHop also praised Jones, describing her performance on the song's melody and hook as "beautiful", while Respect Magazine called Jones' vocals "captivating." The single's production work by DJ Khalil has also been praised, with Rapzilla stating that "[Khalil] provides the perfect backdrop for K.R.I.T. to walk into your church in the middle of service and express his frustrations with hypocrisies and for Crae to walk in behind him and calm the mob down while still co-signing K.R.I.T.’s verse." RESPECT. called the instrumentation by Khalil "incredible."

== Music video ==
A music video was filmed for the song and was directed by Motion Family. The video aired December 13, 2012 on the MTV Networks channels MTV Jams, mtvU, and MTV2. It features Lecrae, Big K.R.I.T., and Ashthon Jones in a church attending the funeral service of a friend, with Big K.R.I.T. playing the church organ.

== Personnel ==
- Lecrae – primary artist
- Big K.R.I.T. – featured artist, recording
- Ashthon Jones – featured artist
- DJ Khalil – producer, additional keyboards
- Chin Injeti – bass, guitar
- Rahki – live drums
- Danny Keyz – keyboards
- Lincoln "Bar-None" Morris – vocal production, recording
- Joseph Prielozny – recording
- Carlton Lynn – mixing
