= Confessions (song) =

"Confe$$ions"

Song by Lecrae

from the album Gravity
- Released: September 4, 2012
- Genre: Christian hip hop
- Length: 3:18
- Label: Reach Records
- Songwriters: L. Moore; Z. Crowell; D. O. Okoth; M. Jefferson; T. Esmond; J. Prielozny; C. Mackey
- Producers: Dirty Rice; Joseph Prielozny; Lecrae (exec.); Zach Crowell

Music video
- Video on YouTube

"Confessions", styled "Confe$$ions", is a Christian hip hop song by Lecrae from his album Gravity, released on September 4, 2012. Lyrically, the song critiques the pursuit of wealth and expresses the emptiness and lack of peace that comes with materialism.

== Lyrics and style ==
StupidDOPE called "Confe$$ions" "a deep, hard hitting, thoughtful number that finds Lecrae speaking from his heart while he hangs out and shows us the wolves", and AllHipHop explained the song as addressing the hollowness wealth without peace. The BoomBox stated that "The old saying 'money can't buy you happiness' isn't further from the truth for Lecrae, who raps about companions who have the game twisted about what's really important". Allmusic described Lecrae as taking on bling culture with a Christian-based message "in the unexpected, brittle style of a beatnik poet or Saul Williams on Def Poetry Jam." Stylistically, the song features a dramatic, slow-tempo beat, and DaSouth described it as carrying "a burdened aroma of ecclesiastical despondency with an uncredited Bruno Mars-esque chorus (no diss at all)".

== Music video ==
The music video for "Confe$$ions" depicts a masquerade ball at which David Banner portrays a dissatisfied gold-masked millionaire engaging with a gold-masked woman dressed in green, interspersed with footage of a hunting wolf. Video director Kyle Dettman explained that the wolf, which tracks down and devours a quail, symbolizes the predatory inner character of the millionaire as he pursues money, represented by the woman in gold and green. The video debuted on BET's hip-hop music video station 106 & Park on April 30, 2013.
