= Ashthon Jones =

American singer (born 1986)

- Born: February 27, 1986 (age 40); Valdosta, Georgia, U.S.
- Origin: Goodlettsville, Tennessee, U.S.
- Genre: R&B
- Occupation: Singer
- Instrument: Vocals
- Years active: 2011–present

Ashthon Jones (born February 27, 1986) is an American singer from Goodlettsville, Tennessee. Jones finished as the 13th place finalist on the tenth season of American Idol.

== Early life and education ==
Jones was born in 1986 to Michelle Anderson. She grew up in Valdosta, Georgia, before moving to Goodlettsville, Tennessee, when she was 12. She attended W.G. Nunn Elementary School in Valdosta as a child. Her father died when she was 14, and she ran away from home at 15, but returned home after two and a half years. She worked as a retail manager in Nashville before appearing on American Idol.

== American Idol ==
=== Overview ===
Jones auditioned for the tenth season of American Idol in Nashville, Tennessee. She was not one of the five female vote getters in the semi-final round to advance to the Top 13. She was one of the six selected to sing for a wild card and advanced to the Top 13. She is the third wild card finalist to be the eliminated first in the finals, with the previous ones being Leah LaBelle from season 3 and Jasmine Murray from season 8 two years earlier. The judges unanimously agreed not to save her.

=== Performances/results ===
Episode	Theme	Song choice	Original artist	Order #	Result
Audition	Auditioner's Choice	"Like We Never Loved at All"	Faith Hill	N/A	Advanced
Hollywood Round, Part 1	First Solo	"Move"	Dreamgirls	N/A	Advanced
Hollywood Round, Part 2	Group Performance	"Hit 'Em Up Style (Oops!)"	Blu Cantrell	N/A	Advanced
Hollywood Round, Part 3	Second Solo	"And I Am Telling You I'm Not Going"	Jennifer Holliday	N/A	Advanced
Las Vegas Round	Songs of The Beatles; Group Performance	"Ticket to Ride"	The Beatles	N/A	Advanced
Hollywood Round Final	Final Solo	"I Wanna Dance with Somebody (Who Loves Me)"	Whitney Houston	N/A	Advanced
Top 24 (12 Women)	Personal Choice	"Love All Over Me"	Monica	7	Wild Card
Wild Card	Personal Choice	"And I Am Telling You I'm Not Going"	Jennifer Holliday	1	Advanced
Top 13	Your Personal Idol	"When You Tell Me That You Love Me"	Diana Ross	3	Eliminated

== Post-Idol ==
She performed on Live with Regis and Kelly after her elimination. She and Karen Rodriguez did not take part in the 2011 American Idols LIVE! Tour 2011 Tour, but she did return for the American Idol finale and sang in the girls Beyoncé Medley with Haley Reinhart, Pia Toscano, Thia Megia, Naima Adedapo, and Karen Rodriguez, as well as singing "Born This Way" with the entire Top 13. On March 3, 2012 she released her first single, "Lookout." She was featured with Big K.R.I.T. on the song "Mayday" from the album Gravity by Lecrae. She was also featured on the song "Good 2getha" from Big K.R.I.T.'s mixtape King Remembered in Time.

== Influences ==
Jones lists her musical influences as Mary Mary, Whitney Houston, Chaka Khan, and The Clark Sisters.
