= Excellent (album) =

Studio album by Propaganda
- Released: September 25, 2012
- Genre: Christian hip hop, spoken word
- Length: 43:37
- Label: Humble Beast
- Producer: Beautiful Eulogy

Propaganda chronology
Art Ambidextrous (2011)	Excellent (2012)	Crimson Cord (2014)

Excellent is the fourth studio album from Christian hip hop and spoken word artist Propaganda. Produced by Beautiful Eulogy, it was released by Humble Beast Records on September 25, 2012. The album charted on the Billboard 200 at No. 184 and was met with a positive reception from critics.

== Recording and release ==
Excellent was produced by the hip-hop group Beautiful Eulogy. It was released on September 25, 2012. The same day, a music video for the title track was released. A second music video, for "Redefined Cutter", followed on March 25, 2013.

== Critical reception ==
Professional ratings
Review scores
Source	Rating
CCM Magazine	3/5 stars
The Christian Manifesto	4/5 stars
Christian Music Zine	5/5 stars
Cross Rhythms	9/10 squares
HM	4/5 stars
Indie Vision Music	5/5 stars
Jesus Freak Hideout	4.5/5 stars
New Release Tuesday	4/5 stars
Rapzilla	4/5 stars

Excellent met with positive reception from music critics. At Rapzilla, Nyon Smith rated the album a four out of five stars, stating that Propaganda made "something that is life-applicable and life-relatable", but opined that, while a good poet, Propaganda should have rapped more. Ian Harvey of HM rated the album four out of five stars, writing that Propaganda is setting "the bar higher for the word than imagined." At CCM Magazine, Andrew Greer rated the album three stars out of five, noting the album's "easy oscillation between rap and spoken poetry." Steve Hayes of Cross Rhythms rated the album nine out of ten squares, stating that "The only pity is that it's so short." At Jesus Freak Hideout, Scott Fryberger rated the album four-and-a-half stars out of five, commenting on the lyrical depth of the album. Dwayne Lacy of New Release Tuesday rated the album four stars out of five, saying that the release will leave the listener intellectually stimulated. At Indie Vision Music, Jessica Cooper rated the album a perfect five stars, considering Excellent "a superior piece of art stuffed with truth, bursting with originality, not lacking in boldness, that accurately conveys his brilliance as an artist." Michael Wildes of The Christian Manifesto rated the album four stars out of five, writing that "Excellent is a paradox; it holds up pictures of broken images that we constantly look at throughout life, analyzes them for those values and calls them to a greater standard." At Christian Music Zine, Anthony Peronto rated the album a perfect five stars, saying that "the poetry will widen your perspective while Beautiful Eulogy’s original production will surely keep your ears from falling into habituation."

== Commercial performance ==
For the Billboard charting week of October 13, 2012, Excellent charted a No. 184 on the Billboard 200, No. 14 on the Christian Albums chart, No. 17 on the Top Gospel chart, No. 19 on the Rap Albums chart, and No. 43 on the Independent Albums chart.

== Track listing ==
No.	Title	Writer(s)	Length
1.	"Don't Listen to Me"	Jason Emmanuel Petty, Courtland Urbano	2:31
2.	"Excellent"	Petty, Bryan L. Winchester	2:08
3.	"Redefine Cutter" (featuring Theory Hazit)	Petty, Thomas Joseph Terry, Urbano	3:28
4.	"Raise the Banner"	Petty, Terry, Urbano	4:22
5.	"Excellent Analogy"		1:33
6.	"Conquer"	Petty, Winchester	2:53
7.	"Precious Puritans" (featuring Kevin "K.O." Olusola)	Petty, Terry, Urbano	4:09
8.	"Forgive Me for Asking"	Petty, Terry, Urbano	4:53
9.	"I Ain't Got an Answer" (featuring Sho Baraka)	Petty, Amisho Baraka Lewis, Terry, Urbano	5:08
10.	"Warm Words"	Petty, Terry, Urbano	3:27
11.	"Lofty" (featuring Joel Davis & Beautiful Eulogy)	Petty, Joel Benjamin Davis, Terry, Urbano	4:42
12.	"Be Present (Live Performance)"	Petty	4:23
Total length:			43:37

== Charts ==
Chart (2012)	Peak position
US Billboard 200	184
US Christian Albums (Billboard)	14
US Top Gospel Albums (Billboard)	17
US Independent Albums (Billboard)	43
US Top Rap Albums (Billboard)	19
