= Church Clothes =

Mixtape by Lecrae
- Released: May 10, 2012
- Genre: Christian hip hop
- Length: 61:35
- Label: Reach Records
- Producer: 9th Wonder; Big Juice; Boi-1da; Charlie Heat; Courtland Urbano; DJ Efechto; Heat Academy; Red on the Beat; Sarah J; Street Symphony; S1; ThaInnaCircle; Tha Kracken!; Tyshane; Wit

Lecrae chronology
Rehab: The Overdose (2011)	Church Clothes (2012)	Gravity (2012)

Singles from Church Clothes
- 1. "Church Clothes" Released: April 27, 2012

Church Clothes is the first mixtape by Christian hip hop artist Lecrae, released for free on May 10, 2012, and hosted by DJ Don Cannon. It featured No Malice of Clipse on the song "Darkest Hour", and included production work by 9th Wonder, Boi-1da, S1 and Street Symphony. Label-mates Tedashii and Andy Mineo, as well as other fellow Christian hip-hop artists such as Dre Murray, Thi'sl, Swoope, Christon Gray, and Braille, also made appearances on the album. The mixtape was downloaded 100,000 times in 48 hours, and met with critical acclaim. It received controversy in Christian media upon its release due to its condemnation of hypocrisy in the Christian Church and Lecrae's collaboration with the mainstream producer Don Cannon. A shorter, remastered EP version was released on iTunes on June 25, 2012. The EP debuted at number 10 on the Billboard Christian Albums and Gospel Albums charts.

== Release and reception ==
On May 3, 2012, Lecrae premiered his music video for the title-track of his Church Clothes mixtape online on XXL. This followed his release of the title-track on Rapzilla on April 27, 2012, for free download. The video was noted for including cameos by Kendrick Lamar and DJ Premier, and attracted almost 20,000 views in less than a day. The mixtape itself was subsequently released for free on May 10, 2012 on the website DatPiff.com, and within 48 hours reached 100,000 downloads. It reached 250,000 downloads (rated platinum on DatPiff) in less than a month. Bun B was also noted as promoting the album. Artists featured on the mixtape include No Malice, formerly Malice, of Clipse on the song "Darkest Hour", fellow labelmates Tedashii and Andy Mineo, as well as Dre Murray, Thi'sl, Swoope, and Christon Gray. Propaganda, Odd Thomas, and Braille from Humble Beast appeared on the track "Misconception", with Humble Beast member Courtland Urbano providing production. Braille, Odd Thomas, and Courtland Urbano all are members of Beautiful Eulogy. The mixtape also included input from notable producers 9th Wonder, Boi-1da, S1, and Street Symphony. The day before the release of Church Clothes, DaSouth stated the album "may be the most important Christian hip hop album in history." In support of this opinion, the writer cited Lecrae's collaboration with Don Cannon, the featuring of No Malice along with the producers S1, 9th Wonder, and Street Symphony, the fact that the album was free, and Lecrae's more "relational" lyrical approach. The single "Church Clothes" was also chosen as a Staff Pick for the week of May 7, 2012, by iHipHop. On June 25, 2012, a remastered version of the mixtape, without DJ Don Cannon, was released as an EP for sale on iTunes. Due to issues with sampling, this version was much shorter with only seven songs. Upon its release, the EP was noted by Rapzilla for reaching number 5 on the iTunes Hip Hop/Rap charts, and it debuted on the Billboard charts as number 10 on both the Christian Albums and Gospel Albums charts for the week of July 14, 2012.

=== Controversy ===
"Church Clothes"
The mixtape's title track drew controversy over its attack on Church hypocrisy over issues such as fashion.

Following its release, the mixtape garnered controversy in Christian media. Fears were raised over Lecrae's collaboration with the "secular" Cannon and the possibility of him losing touch with the Gospel and "selling-out" to a mainstream audience. His harsh view of the Church, particularly taken in the song "Church Clothes", also drew concern. Lecrae responded that his song "Church Clothes" was written in the third-person and was voicing a non-Christian's view of the Church. He also explained that the song was meant to expose hypocrisy both in the Church and in the view of the Church by unbelievers. In a video interview with The Source, Lecrae said that "just because you're inconsistent doesn't mean the Truth isn't the Truth." Paul S. Morton, Keisha Allen, and Kenneth T. Whalum Jr. have all come out in support for the song. As for his move into the mainstream, Lecrae has explained that he is attempting to move out of the stigma of being a "Gospel rapper" and reach out to a broader culture. In a blog post designed to clarify his stance, Lecrae wrote: "[Christians] limit spirituality to salvation and sanctification. As long as we are well versed in personal piety and individual salvation, we think we're good. But most Christians have no clue how to engage culture in politics, science, economics, TV, music or art. We tend to leave people to their own devices there." Rapzilla supported this stance, with Chris Lassiter saying "I pray that the Christian Hip-Hop community would have such a vision for the glory of God in music, production, videography, lyricism, etc., that anyone that wanted to experience Hip-Hop at its highest art form would have to come to the Christians."

=== Critical reception ===
Professional ratings
Review scores
Source	Rating
AllHipHop	8/10
The Christian Manifesto	J. F. Arnold: Nick Ahern: 4.25/5 Michael Wildes:
DaSouth	4/5 stars
FNFLive	9.2/10 (Classic status)
Indie Vision Music	4/5 stars
XXL	XL (4/5)

The mixtape was praised by critics, particularly for its production and lyrical content. AllHipHop rated the album eight out of ten, praising the album's "ability to focus on the Christian values without coming off as preachy, or even Bible-thumping." The Christian Manifesto in an audio review called the production solid and praised the emcee work on "Misconception", but stated that "No Regrets" failed to match the energy and intensity of the first half of the album. J. F. Arnold rated the album 4.5 out of 5, while Nick Ahern gave it 4.25 out of 5. Ahern stated that he had not been a fan of Lecrae, but that his opinion changed on this release, mainly due to Lecrae's "fierceness" and speed. A written review by Michael Wildes for The Christian Manifesto rated the album a complete five stars and nominated it for that website's annual Lime Awards. DaSouth, which rated the album four out of five, viewed "No Regrets" more favorably, calling Suzy Rock's singing "top-notch" and regarding the collaboration of Big Juice and Street Symphony as a "near perfect backdrop". Both DaSouth and AllHipHop leveled some criticism at "Darkest Hour", with AllHipHop calling the hook "cheezy" and DaSouth viewing the track as a personal low-point, calling it too slow and stating that they expected more from No Malice. Mike McCray from The Fayetteville Observer was favorable to the album, stating at the end of his review that "I never thought I’d hear the day gospel music sampled Pimp C, but I’m glad I did. Church Clothes is 'come as you are' music, presenting faith as a defining theme without being pious. The project may ruffle some feathers, but its wider appeal can’t be overlooked." Jam the Hype Radio highly praised the mixtape, stating, "It contains some of the best hip-hop songs of the year and is totally worth the listen!" StupidDOPE was highly favorable to the album, praising Lecrae's mic skills and noting that he "is finally stepping onto the mainstream stage" with his collaboration with No Malice on "Darkest Hour". XXL gave the album an "XL" rating, the equivalent of four out of five, calling Church Clothes a "strong release in that it helps deliver a message without beating the listener over the head with religious propaganda". The production was highly praised by the magazine, which noted the appearance of 9th Wonder on "Rise" and "Long Time Coming" but stated that the more unknown producers Big Juice and Street Symphony on "No Regrets" and Tha Kracken! on "Rejects" stole the show. Indie Vision Music rated the album four out of five, praising the songs "Church Clothes", "Sacrifice", and "Rejects", among others, but leveling some criticism at, among others, the songs "APB", "Special" and "Rise". The mixtape was also chosen by iHipHop as a Staff Pick for May 14, 2012, with staff member jGerson writing that "I might have to agree with Serge. There was nothing I was feeling more this week than Lecrae's mixtape Church Clothes mixtape." jGerson listed the track "Rise" as their favorite on the album. Vibe viewed the album favorably, stating that "The dude can surely spit, but Church Clothes starts off sounding very boxed in and predictable. However, once you get to the middle—and get into some of the impeccable production... ...Lecrae proves to be a promising new talent with some amazing tracks under his belt." Vibe listed standout tracks as "The Price Of Life," "Inspiration," "Darkest Hour," "Rise," and "Church Clothes."

== Track listing ==
No.	Title	Producer(s)	Length
1.	"Co-Sign"	Heat Academy	3:10
2.	"APB" (featuring Thi'sl)	Charlie Heat; Sarah J	3:32
3.	"Church Clothes"	Wit	2:24
4.	"Cold World" (featuring Tasha Catour)	Street Symphony	3:33
5.	"Welcome to H-Town" (featuring Tedashii, Dre Murray and VonWon (uncredited))	Wit	4:32
6.	"Inspiration"	Wit	2:30
7.	"Rise"	9th Wonder	3:12
8.	"Darkest Hour" (featuring No Malice)	ThaInnaCircle	2:37
9.	"Black Rose"	Tyshane	2:56
10.	"The Price of Life" (featuring Andy Mineo and Co Campbell)	S1	4:00
11.	"Special" (featuring Lester L2 Shaw)	ThaInnaCircle	3:29
12.	"No Regrets" (featuring Suzy Rock)	Big Juice; Street Symphony	3:31
13.	"Gimme A Second"	Boi-1da	3:33
14.	"Long Time Coming" (featuring Swoope)	9th Wonder	3:17
15.	"Misconception" (featuring Propaganda, Beautiful Eulogy and DJ Efechto)	Courtland Urbano	4:31
16.	"Spazz"	Charlie Heat; Sarah J	3:24
17.	"Sacrifice"	Red On The Beat; Sarah J	3:58
18.	"Rejects" (featuring Christon Gray)	Tha Kracken!	3:32
Total length:			58:04

=== EP version ===
Church Clothes EP
No.	Title	Length
1.	"APB" (featuring Thi'sl)	3:40
2.	"Cold World" (featuring Tasha Catour)	3:50
3.	"No Regrets" (featuring Suzy Rock)	3:36
4.	"Special" (featuring Lester L2 Shaw)	3:39
5.	"Misconception" (featuring Propaganda, Beautiful Eulogy and DJ Efechto)	4:28
6.	"Spazz"	3:35
7.	"Rejects" (featuring Christon Gray)	3:31

== Chart history ==
Church Clothes debuted at number 10 on the Billboard Christian Albums and Gospel Albums charts. Released on iTunes, it was reported by Rapzilla that the album reached number 5 on iTunes's Hip Hop/Rap chart.

Chart	Peak position
US Christian	10
US Gospel	10
US Rap	75
