= Jackie Hill Perry =

American poet and writer (born 1989)

- Born: Jacquelyn Hill; June 21, 1989 (age 37); St. Louis, Missouri, United States
- Genres: Spoken word, Christian hip-hop
- Occupations: Poet, hip-hop artist, writer
- Instrument: Voice
- Years active: 2008–present
- Labels: Humble Beast, P4CM, Reach Records
- Website: Official website

Jackie Hill Perry (née Jackie Hill, born June 21, 1989) is an American poet, writer, hip-hop artist and Christian influencer. She initially garnered popularity for her performances of Christian spoken word pieces. She has written for various Christian ministry organizations, such as The Resurgence and John Piper's Desiring God, on the topic of Christianity and homosexuality. She signed to the Portland, Oregon-based Christian hip-hop label Humble Beast in January 2014, and released her debut album on November 4, 2014, available both commercially and for free. Hill married fellow spoken word artist Preston Perry in March 2014; the couple currently have four children.

== Biography ==
=== Early life (birth to 2008) ===
Jackie Hill Perry was born Jackie Hill on June 21, 1989, in St. Louis. She was raised without a father in her home and experienced sexual abuse at the age of five. Hill attended church until she was ten. She said an encounter with sexual abuse, school bullying and a lack of attention from boys contributed to her struggle with gender confusion.

At age 17, she started pursuing multiple serial relationships with other women. Hill's second girlfriend suggested that she become a stud, a woman who takes a masculine role in a lesbian relationship. Hill began to gain attention from girls when she assumed the stud role, explaining that "I was never the 'cute chick' but when I became a stud, it seemed like every girl wanted me. I would be in straight clubs and have girls throwing themselves at me. For a girl that's insecure and craves to feel loved, that was like a drug for me." In October 2008, she converted to Christianity.

=== Conversion and current activities (2008–present) ===
As recounted in her poem "My Life as a Stud", Hill states that "...one day, the Lord spoke to me. He said, 'She will be the death of you.' In that moment, the scripture for the wages of sin equal death finally clicked." Hill left her girlfriend, returned to church, and started writing poetry. She performed her first spoken word piece at a P4CM poetry conference in 2010, and met Preston Perry, the man who would eventually become her husband. The couple married in March 2014.

Record label Humble Beast announced on January 7, 2014 that it had signed Hill Perry as an artist. She has appeared as a guest musician on several Christian hip-hop recordings, including Because You Asked by Swoope and Instruments of Mercy by Beautiful Eulogy. Her debut album, The Art of Joy, was produced by Beautiful Eulogy and released on November 4, 2014 Hill Perry is also a staff member of the Legacy Movement ministry. In 2016, Hill Perry, JGivens and John Givez were featured on Lecrae's "Misconceptions 3" from the album Church Clothes 3. Hill Perry and her husband are part of "Poets in Autumn,” a worldwide tour of Christian spoken word artists including Ezekiel Azonwu, Chris Webb, Joseph Solomon and Janette...IKZ. They create collaborative and individual pieces that address topics in the Christian faith. In 2019, Hill Perry and her husband started a podcast called "With the Perrys." They offer insight on relationships, theology, politics, race, and parenting. On June 13, 2024, it was announced that Hill-Perry had signed to Reach Records. Alongside the announcement, she released a new single, "First Draft".

== Stance on homosexuality ==
In a 2013 interview with Wade-O Radio, Jackie Hill Perry cited 1 Corinthians 6:9-11 and stated that "The word of God itself, apart from Jackie Hill, testifies that people can change. So if the word of God is the word of God, then we need to deal with that and believe that it's true. I think we've made God very little if we believe that he cannot change people. If he can make a moon, stars and a galaxy that we have yet to fully comprehend, how can he not simply change my desires?"

Hill Perry, in the same 2013 interview with Wade-O Radio, clarified that she does not believe that every Christian with a homosexual disposition will lose those desires. "If God chooses not to change my desires, he has promised to give me his Holy Spirit that will help me flee from them. There are people who were alcoholics for 20 years, went through rehab and they don't drink anymore, but sometimes they may be tested. If they see a bottle of whiskey, they're going to want that whiskey, but they have a choice."

Hill Perry, in her 2018 book Gay Girl, Good God, stated, "God isn't calling gay people to be straight", and says those who teach this are preaching a "heterosexual gospel". She further stated "the most alarming problem with the 'heterosexual gospel' is that it is no gospel at all." and stated that the gospel is not about "temptation-less heterosexuality" but that "Jesus has come so that all sinners, same-sex-attracted and opposite-sex-attracted, can be forgiven of their sins to love God and enjoy Him forever."

== Writing ==
Jackie Hill Perry has written for various Christian ministry organizations, focusing on reconciling issues of homosexuality with Christianity. Among these are her articles "Love Letter to a Lesbian", written for Desiring God, a ministry of John Piper, and "A Christian Response to the Same-Sex Marriage Ruling", for The Resurgence, a ministry of the now-defunct Mars Hill Church. Hill Perry also released her own book, Gay Girl Good God, which was published September 3, 2018. She is also author of a Bible study for women and teen girls "Jude: Contending for the Faith in Today's Culture.". Hill Perry released her second book, Holier Than Thou: How God's Holiness Helps Us Trust Him, in 2021. Hill Perry's third book, Upon Waking, was released in 2023.

== Discography ==
=== Studio albums ===
Title	Details	Peak chart positions			
Title	Details	US	US Christ	US Gospel	UK C&G
The Art of Joy	Released: November 4, 2014; Label: Humble Beast; Formats: CD, digital download, streaming	—	25	5	—
Crescendo	Released: April 20, 2018; Label: Humble Beast, Fair Trade/Columbia; Formats: CD, digital download, streaming	— (Note: Crescendo did not enter the Billboard 200, but peaked at No. 98 on the Top Current Album Sales)	17	— (Note: Beginning in 2015, Billboard rendered most hip hop/rap albums ineligible for the gospel charts.)	13
Blameless	Released: September 19, 2025; Label: Reach Records; Formats: Digital download, streaming	—	48	— (Note: Beginning in 2015, Billboard rendered most hip hop/rap albums ineligible for the gospel charts.)	—
"—" denotes a recording that did not chart or was not released in that territory.

=== EP ===
- Practice (2024)

=== Singles ===
- First Draft (2024)
- Stay Low (Remix) (2024)
- The Power of the Cross (2020)
- Woman (2018)
- Far Away (2018)
- Lamentations (2018)

=== Other charted songs ===
List of other charted songs with selected chart positions
Title	Year	Peak chart positions	Album
Title	Year	US Christ	Album
"Misconceptions 3" (with Lecrae, John Givez, and JGivens)	2016	39	Church Clothes 3

== Accolades ==
Year	Organization	Nominee / work	Category	Result	Ref.
2026	Dove Awards	Blameless	Rap/Hip Hop Album of the Year	Pending	
2026	Dove Awards	Blameless	Recorded Music Packaging of the Year	Pending	
2026	Dove Awards	"I Ain't Worried"	Short Form Music Video of the Year (Performance)	Pending	
