= Eshon Burgundy =

American rapper

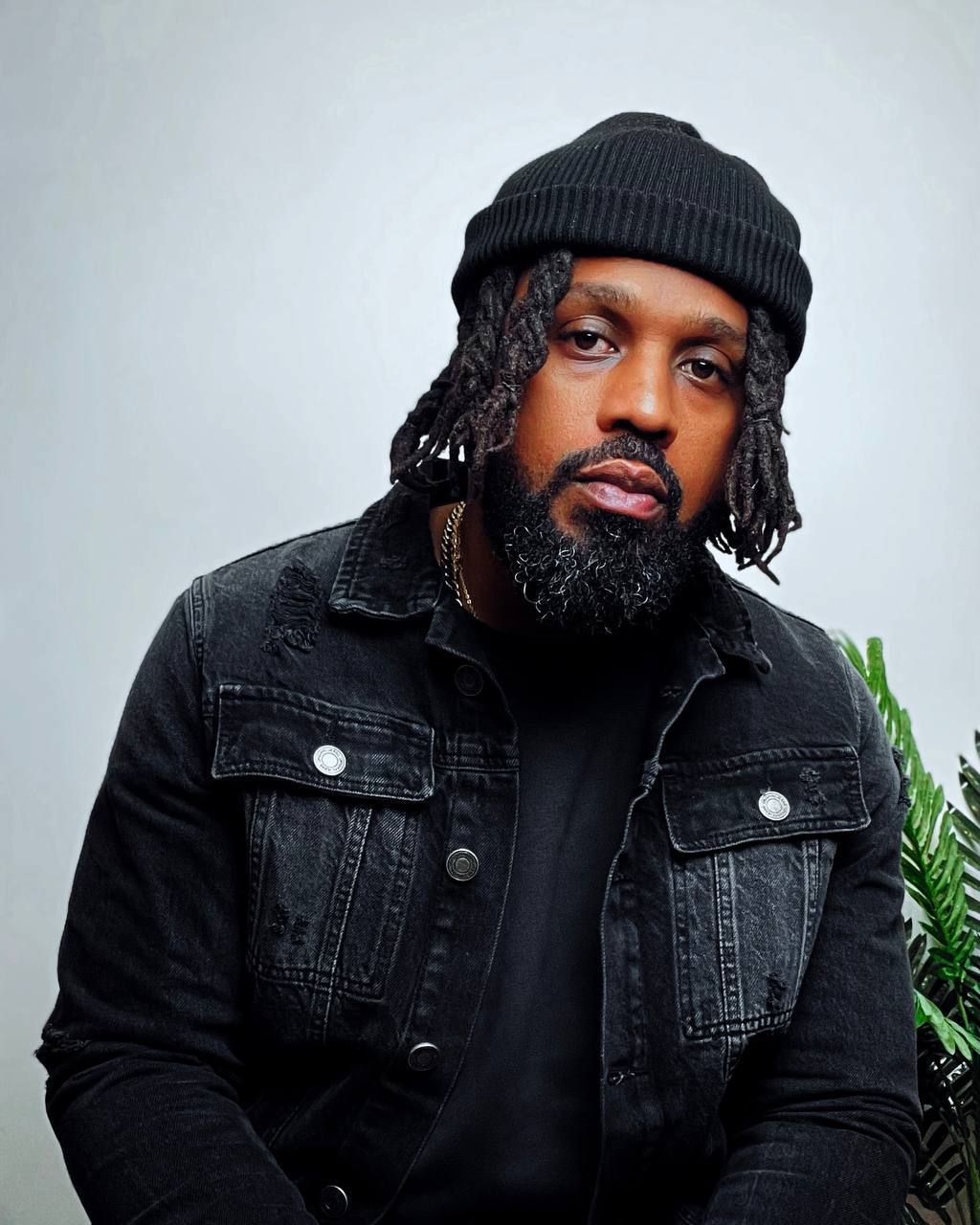

Background information
- Also known as: Eshon Burgundy
- Born: Anton Eshon Hairston; April 21, 1980 (age 46); Abington, Pennsylvania, U.S.
- Origin: Jacksonville, Florida, U.S.
- Genres: Gospel music, Christian hip hop
- Occupations: Rapper; singer-songwriter
- Instrument: Vocals
- Years active: 2007–present
- Label: RMORY (NFTRY)
- Website: eshonburgundy.com, rmoryreserve.com

Anton Eshon Hairston (born April 21, 1980), better known by his stage name Eshon Burgundy, is an American former Christian rapper.

His first album, Blood Rushing to My Head, was released in 2012 by Salvation Armie Music Group. He released his second album, The Fear of God (2015), with Humble Beast Records.

== Early life ==
Eshon Burgundy was born Anton Eshon Hairston in Abington, Pennsylvania, He was raised by his mother Rochelle in Philadelphia, Pennsylvania. He was raised in an environment of constantly moving from residence-to-residence across Philadelphia after his mother was in an abusive relationship with a boyfriend at the time. They eventually settled in a housing complex, Passyunk Homes. This would lead him to become the responsible oldest sibling in his family, where he has two younger brothers, Seifuddin and Ameer, and a younger sister, Aleema. Eshon was shot three times when he was 15 years old, coming within minutes of dying. This was the impetus for him to dedicate the next five years of his life to being involved in the hip hop underground community in his hometown of Philadelphia. He later signed two record deals with drug kingpins around 2000 but never released any music. He became a Christian in 2001 and began making Christian hip hop music in his hometown, until he relocated to Jacksonville, Florida.

== Music career ==
His professional music career began in 2007, when he was featured along with poet Black Ice on Dj Jazzy Jeff's Return of the Magnificent album. The song was entitled Run that back. Eshon Burgundy released his debut album Blood Rushing to My Head with Salvation Armie Music Group on July 24, 2012.

His second album, The Fear of God, was released by Humble Beast Records on March 3, 2015, just shy of his thirty-fifth birthday. This was his Billboard chart breakthrough album, with it charting at No. 15 on the Christian Albums, No. 20 on the Rap Albums, No. 25 on the Independent Albums, and on the Heatseekers Albums at No. 4.

On May 27, 2016, Eshon Burgundy released his highly anticipated third album called The Passover. The album was inspired by the Passover of the Exodus of the Israelites out of Egypt. He then released a fourth and most recent album which he named for the Love of Money on September 20, 2019.

Beginning in late 2020, Burgundy began to refer to himself as a Hebrew, the idea that he—as a descendant of Black American slaves—is a true Hebrew Israelite. As such, he has begun to distance himself from mainstream Christianity and the larger Evangelical community.

== Personal life ==
Eshon Burgundy has a wife, Zara, and they have three children. Harlem, Evyr and Kinsington. They recently previously lived Africa.

== Discography ==
List of studio albums, with selected chart positions
Title	Album details	Peak chart positions			
Title	Album details	US Chr	US Indie	US Rap	US Heat
Blood Rushing to My Head	Released: July 24, 2012; Label: Salvation Armie; CD, digital download	–	–	–	–
The Fear of God	Released: March 3, 2015; Label: Humble Beast; CD, digital download	15	25	20	4
The Passover	Released: May 27, 2016; Label: NFTRY; CD, digital download	8	-	-	-
For The Love Of Money	Released: September 20, 2019; Label: NFTRY; CD, digital download	-	-	-	-
Joppa	Released: July 17, 2020; Label: NFTRY; CD, digital download	-	-	-	-
Don't Shoot The Messenger	Released: January 8, 2021; Label: NFTRY; CD, digital download	-	-	-	-
It Is What It Is	Released: October 28, 2021; Label: RMORY; CD, digital download	-	-	-	-
Lost Sheep	Released: January 20, 2023; Label: RMORY; CD, digital download	-	-	-	-
Lost Sheep Deluxe	Released: April 7, 2023; Label: RMORY; CD, digital download	-	-	-	-
