= Liz Vice =

- Also known as: Liz Vice
- Born: Elizabeth Lorraine Vice; February 9, 1983 (age 42)
- Origin: Portland, Oregon, U.S.
- Genres: Christian R&B; gospel; soul; R&B; urban gospel; contemporary R&B
- Occupations: Singer, songwriter
- Instruments: vocals, singer
- Years active: 2015–present
- Labels: Ramseur
- Website: lizvice.com

Elizabeth Lorraine Vice (born February 9, 1983) is an American gospel music recording artist and musician from Portland, Oregon. Her music career started in 2015, with the studio album, There's a Light, with Ramseur Records. This album was her breakthrough release upon the Billboard magazine charts.

== Early life ==
Liz Vice was born, Elizabeth Lorraine Vice, on February 9, 1983, in Portland, Oregon, where she was the third of five children. Her physical health declined, when she was 19, having to go on hemodialysis for a three-and-a-half-year stretch, eventually giving her a fistula. She obtained a kidney transplant, in 2005, facilitating her eventual recovery from illness.

== Music career ==
Her music career started in 2012, with the studio album, There's a Light, that was originally released with the Deeper Well Collective, and was later re-released on September 25, 2015, by Ramseur Records. The album was her breakthrough release upon the Billboard magazine charts, where it peaked at No. 6 on the Top Gospel Albums chart, and No. 13 on the R&B Albums chart.

== Discography ==
=== Studio albums ===
List of studio albums, with selected chart positions
Title	Album details	Peak chart positions	
Title	Album details	US Gos	US R&B
There's a Light	Released: September 25, 2015; Label: Ramseur; CD, digital download	6	13
