= PQ Monthly =

Defunct monthly LGBT newspaper in Portland, Oregon, U.S.

- Editor: Julie Cortez Editor in Chief
- Photographer: Xilia Faye
- Categories: LGBTQ
- Frequency: Monthly
- Publisher: Melanie Davis
- Founder: Melanie Davis
- Founded: 2012
- First issue: February 16, 2012
- Final issue: December 2017
- Company: Brilliant Media
- Country: United States
- Based in: Portland, Oregon
- Language: English
- Website: pqmonthly.com

PQ Monthly was a free, advertising-supported, monthly LGBTQ newspaper and online publication for Oregon and southwest Washington and, briefly, Seattle, published in Portland, Oregon, United States. The first issue was released on February 16, 2012. The last print issue was released in December 2017.

The owner and publisher of El Hispanic News, and co-founder, of Dykes On Bikes in Portland, Melanie Davis, announced plans to start publishing PQ Monthly soon after Just Out, Portland's semi-monthly LGBTQ newspaper in print since 1983, announced that it was out of business, in December 2011.

== See also ==
- Culture of Portland, Oregon
