= NoiseTrade =

Defunct online distribution platform

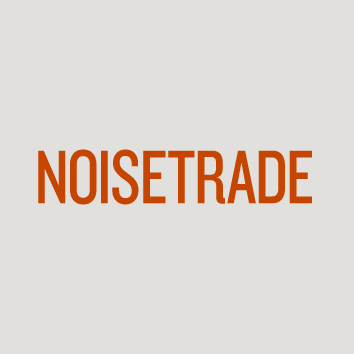
- Website type: Social networking service, music download, streaming media, e-book
- Founded: April 2008; 18 years ago
- Dissolved: 2023
- Headquarters: Nashville, Tennessee, {{{location_country}}}
- Area served: Worldwide
- Owner: Paste Media Group
- Founders: Derek Webb, Joe Kirk, Mark Nicholas, David McCollum, Brannon McAllister
- Employees: 22
- Registration: E-mail and zip-code required download music
- Users: 1.3 million users (December 2015), 50,000 albums (Dec. 2015)
- Launched: April 2008; 18 years ago

NoiseTrade was a global online audio and book direct-to-fan distribution platform. It was based in Nashville, Tennessee. It enables its users to upload original music and books and give away for free without digital rights management to anyone who provides at least an e-mail address and zip code. It was established by Derek Webb and artists he knew after he became one of the first major label artist to give his digital album away. Over 80,000 free copies were downloaded. He used those mailing addresses to book shows. After attendance at his shows had increased dramatically he decided other artists could benefit from the same idea. He decided that the data would be more valuable than money made selling digital albums. Artists upload music with their free account, and then anyone can download ZIP files of mp3 and album art, only requiring an e-mail address and zip-code or country code for an opt-in newsletter from the artist. The media can be shared using various social media or pay artists via a tip-jar. The site takes a 20% cut of the proceeds.

It added features, many of which are common on other music streaming and music download websites, and supports books and other written media as well.

Noisetrade was acquired by PledgeMusic in 2016 and is currently owned by Paste Media Group.

In 2019, the website was merged into Paste's website, and in 2023 all of the available downloads were removed from the website.
