= Braille (rapper) =

American rapper

- Also known as: Braille Brizzy, Reflection
- Born: Bryan Winchester; September 27, 1981 (age 44); Portland, Oregon, US
- Genres: Hip hop
- Occupation: Rapper
- Instrument: Vocals
- Years active: 1994–present
- Labels: Syntax, HipHop IS Music, Talking Textures, Humble Beast

Bryan Winchester (born September 27, 1981), better known by his stage name Braille, is an American underground rapper.

== Career ==
The concept behind the name Braille relates to "Helping People Understand the things they can't see." He has worked with a host of premier hip hop recording acts including his group Lightheaded, with rapper-producer Ohmega Watts and rapper Othello. Braille was also a part of a group called Acts 29 consisting of himself, Ohmega Watts, and Soul Plasma. Acts 29 has only released one album and is not planning on releasing any more material. Braille was signed to Syntax Records in 1999 and continues to record for the label. The majority of his recordings are credited to his own label imprint "Hip-hop Is Music." Influenced by the positive vibe of the group A Tribe Called Quest, Braille started recording Christian hip hop music. His first album called Lifefirst: Half the Battle was released when he was 17 years old.

=== Beautiful Eulogy ===
His fourth album The IV Edition released in 2008, and was a collaboration with Speech from Arrested Development. The song is included on the video game NBA Live 09. Braille toured internationally including in Europe and Japan. His most recent projects include Cloud Nineteen, an album release and interactive DVD. He is also planning a special concert tour and youth presentation aimed at students of the arts, emphasizing the importance of education to all children.

In 2012, Braille collaborated with Odd Thomas and Courtland Urbano to form the group Beautiful Eulogy. David Kincannon of Rapzilla stated, "This musical triumvirate is responsible for some of the most creative hip hop of the last few years, and Satellite Kite does nothing but add to that resume. From the concepts to the beats to the lyrics to the delivery, everything about this album is on point. There is a working relationship between these three men that is obvious by listening to this album. There is also a shared creative spirit that is obvious, and it's that creativity that makes Satellite Kite great."

== Honors ==
In 2004, Braille collaborated with his group Lightheaded (consisting of himself, Ohmega Watts, and Othello), Manchild of Mars Ill, Sharlock Poems of LA Symphony, Tony Stone, Celph Titled, Kno of Cunninlynguists, the Masterminds, 9th Wonder and Rob Swift to produce the album and accompanying video for "Shades of Grey". That year the national publication URB Magazine recognized him as an up-and-coming "Artist to Watch". He was also named "Lyricist of the Year" with Shades of Grey and awarded "Album of the Year" honors by Sphereofhiphop. The following year Braille was selected to open for the Godfather of Soul James Brown's World Tour in 2005 -2006.

The publication R&B Showcase Magazine recognized Braille as "Hip-Hop's New Force" and honored him with a feature and cover story in the fall of 2006. He joined hip hop group De La Soul touring throughout the summer of 2007. The same year Braille added speaking engagements to his tour dates and spoke at a South Jersey benefit for Hold on to Education Foundation Inc. A youth motivational speaker, Braille was chosen by the organization as an honorary board member.

The spiritual collection called Box of Rhymes was Braille's third full-length album, released exclusively in Japan on the Universal/Handcuts record label.

== Discography ==
=== Studio albums ===
Release date	Title	Label	Notes
1999	LifeFirst: Half The Battle	ESPW	
2004	Shades of Grey	HipHop IS Music	
2006	Box of Rhymes	HipHop IS Music	
2008	The IV Edition	HipHop IS Music	
2009	CloudNineteen	HipHop IS Music	Album credited as "Braille and Symbolic One", because all production was by Symbolic One aka S1
2010	Weapon Aid	Syntax	Later made available as a free download from Humble Beast
2011	Native Lungs	Humble Beast	Released as a free download from Humble Beast with limited CD copies.

=== Other releases ===
Release date	Title	Label	Notes
2004	Shades of Grey Japanese Version	HipHop IS Music	Released exclusively in Japan with alternate cover and bonus tracks
2005	"HipHop Music" 12" vinyl single	HipHop IS Music	Limited edition 12" vinyl with B-Side "10 Years" and exclusive remixes.
2005	Scatter Brain	Indie release	Limited edition, hand printed CD-R with no artwork.
2006	"Sonset" 12" vinyl single	HipHop IS Music	Japan exclusive 12" vinyl
2006	Box of Rhymes Japanese Version	HipHop IS Music	Released exclusively in Japan with alternate cover and bonus tracks
2006	"Box of Rhymes" 7" vinyl single	HipHop IS Music	Limited edition 7" vinyl with Box of Rhymes instrumental.
2007	Extra Box for Japan EP	HipHop IS Music	EP with tracks from Box of Rhymes, instrumentals, and remixes. Released exclusively in Japan with 300 limited edition copies released outside Japan.
2007	Survival Movement & Evacuate EP	HipHop IS Music	Limited edition, 12" vinyl EP with songs from Box of Rhymes, remixes, instrumentals, and a new song.
2007	Box of History mixtape mixed by DJ iDull	HipHop IS Music	Free digital download compilation mixtape of Braille's work over the years. Mixed by DJ iDull.
2007	"The IV" 12" vinyl single	HipHop IS Music	Limited edition 12" vinyl with "Counter Attack" and "Shades of Grey" B-sides.
2008	The IV Edition Japanese version	HipHop IS Music	Released exclusively in Japan early with bonus tracks.

== With Lightheaded ==
Release date	Title	Label	Notes
2003	Pure Thoughts	Day By Day/HipHop IS Music	Released on Day by Day in 2003, then re-released with bonus tracks in 2005 on HipHop IS Music
2006	Wrong Way	Tres	

== With Acts 29 ==
Release date	Title	Label	Notes
2002	Under Exposed	Syntax	

== With Beautiful Eulogy ==
Release date	Title	Label	Notes
2012	Satellite Kite	Humble Beast	
2013	Instruments of Mercy	Humble Beast	
2017	Worthy	Humble Beast	
