= Propaganda (musician) =

American rapper and poet

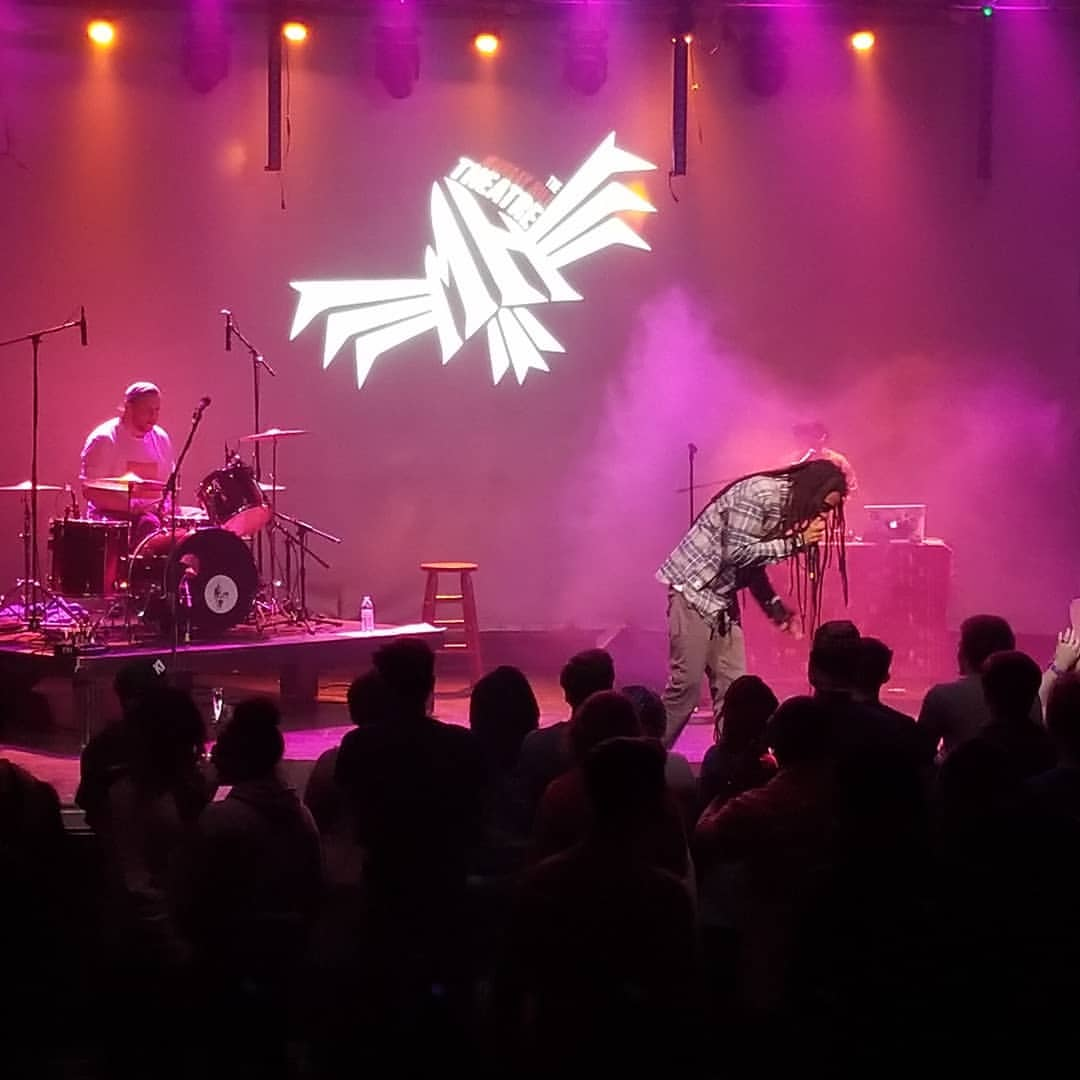
- Propaganda performing at the Murray Hill Theatre in 2018.

Background information
- Born: Jason Emmanuel Petty; May 27, 1979 (age 47); Los Angeles, California, U.S.
- Genres: Hip-hop, spoken word, underground hip-hop
- Occupations: Rapper, pastor, poet
- Years active: 2002–present
- Labels: UpRok, Tunnel Rat, End of Earth, Humble Beast, Empire, RMG
- Website: www.prophiphop.com

Jason Emmanuel Petty (born May 27, 1979), better known by his stage name Propaganda, is an American rapper, spoken word artist, and poet from Los Angeles, California. He has released seven albums as an independent artist, including one collaborative album with Odd Thomas and one with Derek Minor, and has performed and recorded as a member of the underground hip hop group Tunnel Rats and associated act Footsoldiers.

== Biography and musical career ==
Jason Emmanuel Petty was born on May 27, 1979, in Los Angeles, California. In his very early childhood, his family moved into a violent, ethnically Mexican neighborhood. As the only black child in the area, he was often teased due to his race. Later, his family moved again, this time to the suburbs, where his family was known as the "poor black family." He learned to rap, and also took up dance, graffiti, and formal drawing and painting. Discovered by underground hip hop collective Tunnel Rats, he made his debut in 2002 on Speak Life by Sev Statik. In 2003, Petty joined the Tunnel Rats, and on April 8, 2003, released his solo debut album with UpRok Records, entitled Out of Knowhere. In 2006 he released the I Am Not Them EP with Tunnel Rat Music and recorded Live This as part of Tunnel Rats–affiliated group Footsoldiers. Footsoldiers also collaborated with KRS-One on his album Life, with Petty appearing on the song "I Ain't Leaving". Petty released a second solo EP, The Sketchbook: A Small Collection of Unreleased Material, independently in 2008, and his second album, Listen Watch Focus, also came out in 2008 through End of Earth Records.

Petty then released four albums through the Portland-based Humble Beast Records. The first, entitled Art Ambidextrous, was recorded as a dual-album with Odd Thomas, and came out on February 1, 2011. Petty's next album, Excellent, came out in 2012, and charted at No. 7 on the Billboard Top Gospel chart. Petty's fourth solo album, Crimson Cord, came out on April 29, 2014, and also charted successfully. He dropped Crooked, a project that asked serious political and social questions, on June 30, 2017.

Propaganda has traveled the country on several tours, including the "Unlimited Up" tour with Murs and the "Spotlight" tour with Sho Baraka in 2016, as well as the "Tension Tour" with Kings Kaleidoscope in 2017.

== Other activities ==
In addition to his hip hop career, Jason Petty has worked as a youth pastor, led a poetry team called Selah, and helped his sister's dance ministry called "Live." In 2013, he partnered with I Am Second in hosting a poetry contest, Spoken Word Challenge. In 2017, Petty and his wife, Dr. Alma Zaragoza-Petty, recorded The Red Couch Podcast, an eight-episode series in which they discussed social justice issues. He began the Hood Politics with Prop podcast in 2020.

Jason Petty is a frequent contributor to the online work of journalist Robert Evans. In mid-2020, Petty appeared as a guest co-host on the Behind the Police podcast mini-series of the iHeartRadio podcast Behind the Bastards. On this podcast, Evans explained the history of the American police, with Petty reacting to Evans's explanation and adding additional commentary of his own. In early 2021, Petty also appeared as a guest co-host on Evans' Behind the Insurrections mini-series.

== Discography ==
- Out of Knowhere – 2003
- Listen Watch Focus – 2008
- Art Ambidextrous (with Odd Thomas) – 2011
- Excellent – 2012
- Crimson Cord – 2014
- Crooked – 2017
- Nothing But a Word (with Derek Minor) – 2019
- Terraform: The People (with DJ Mal-Ski) - 2021
- Terraform: The Sky (with L's) - 2021
- Terraform: The Possibility - 2023
- Your Arms Are Too Short to Box Wit God (with DJ Sean P) - 2025
- The Beautiful Endling (with Matt Osowski) - 2025

== Filmography ==
Year	Title	Role	Notes
2003	The Battle for L.A.: Footsoldiers, Vol. 1	Himself	Documentary film

Year	Title	Role	Notes
2018	The Box, 4 sessions	Himself	Bible Study film
