= Latin Grammy Award for Best Christian Album (Spanish Language) =

American award for Spanish language music

- Awarded for: Christian Album (Spanish Language) containing at least 51% of newly recorded material
- Country: United States
- Presented by: The Latin Recording Academy
- First award: 2002
- Currently held by: Marcos Witt for Legado (2025)
- Website: latingrammy.com

The Latin Grammy Award for Best Christian Album (Spanish Language) is an award for Latin Christian music given every year since the 5th Latin Grammy Awards ceremony, which took place at the Shrine Auditorium in Los Angeles. The award goes to solo artists, duos, or groups for releasing vocal or instrumental Spanish Christian albums containing at least 51% of new recordings.

In 2002 and 2003 the category was named Best Christian Album and rewarded the Christian albums in Spanish and Portuguese. In 2004, the category was split into two depending on the language, with Portuguese language releases being awarded in the Best Christian Album (Portuguese Language) category ever since.

Since the creation of this category, Marcos Witt has been awarded the most out of any other artist, with six wins, followed by Alex Campos with five.

== Winners and nominees ==
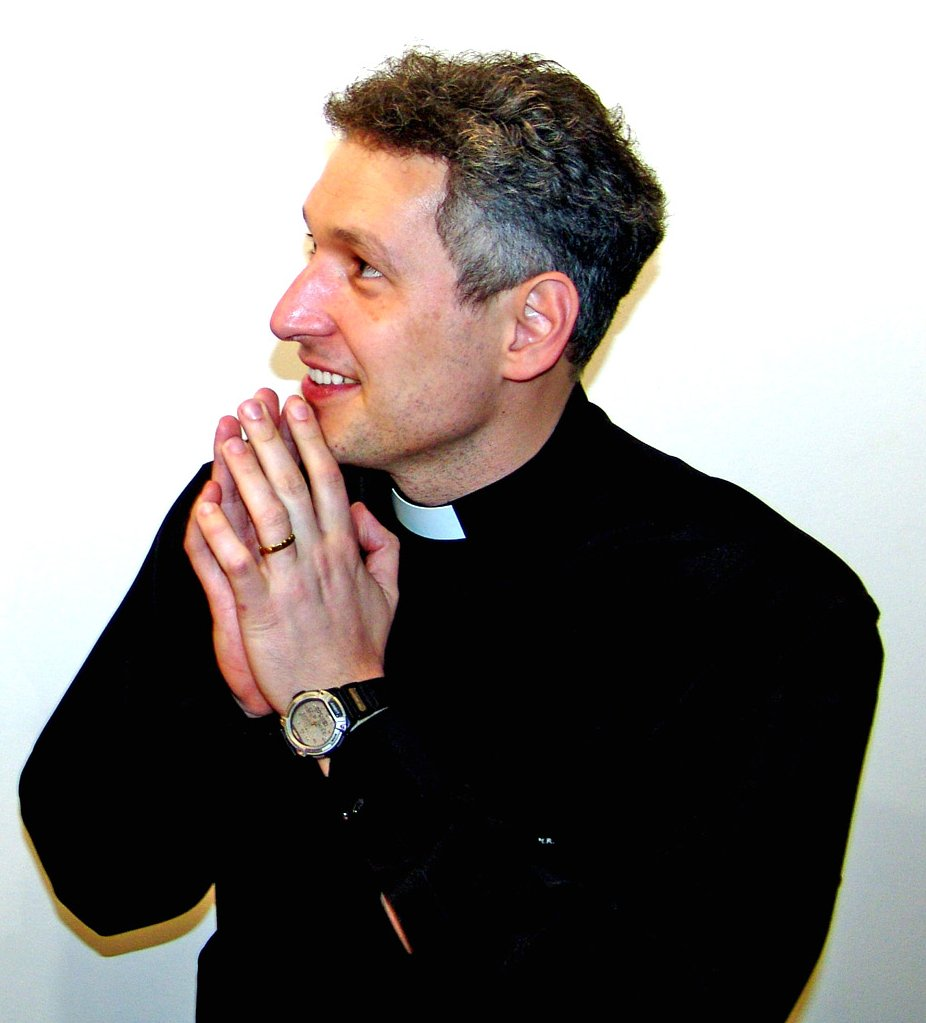
Brazilian musician Marcelo Rossi was the first winner of this category in 2000 when there was only one category for christian albums that included both spanish and portuguese.

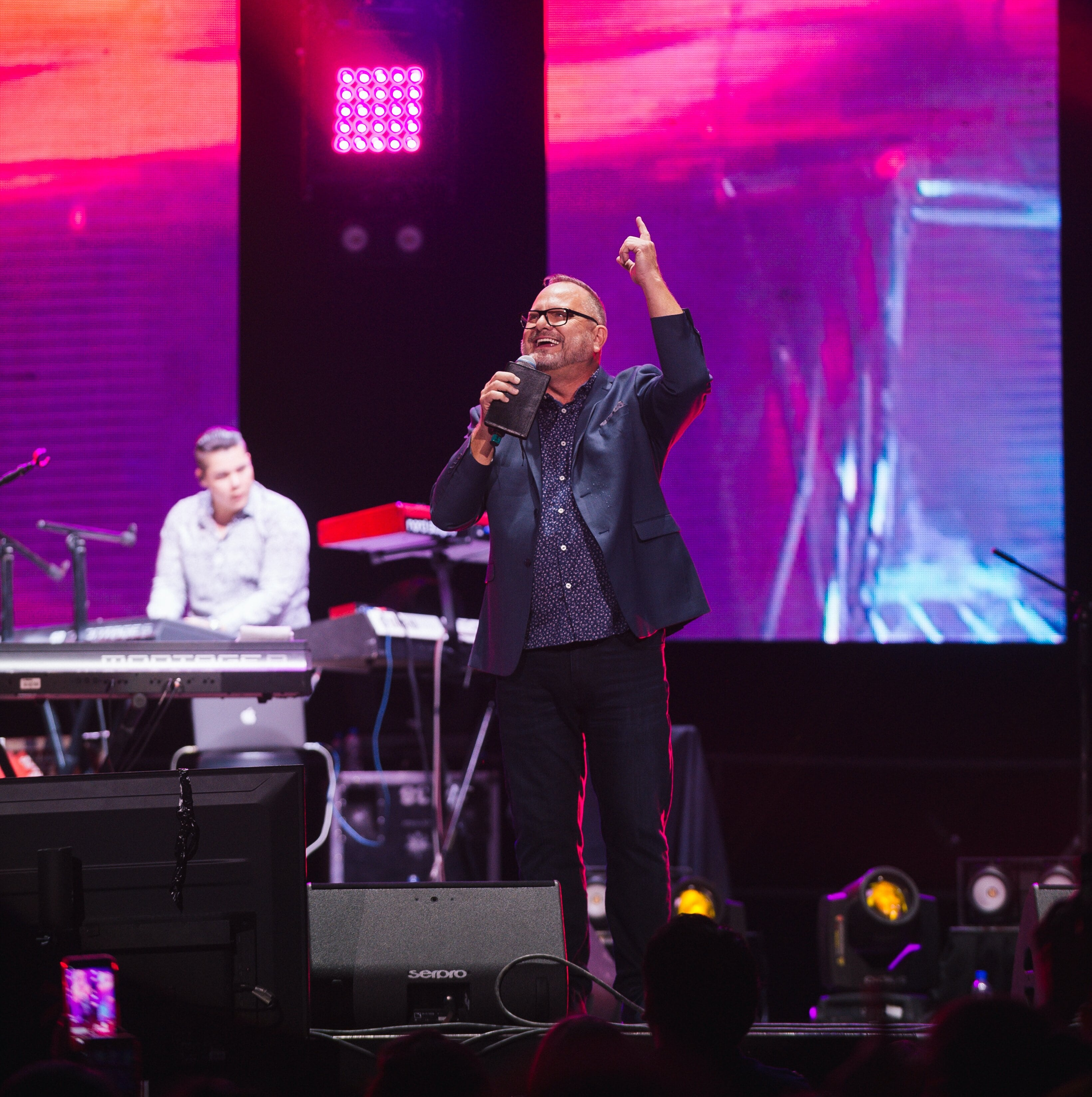
Mexican singer Marcos Witt has won this award seven times, in 2003, 2004, 2006, 2007, 2012, 2022 and 2025.

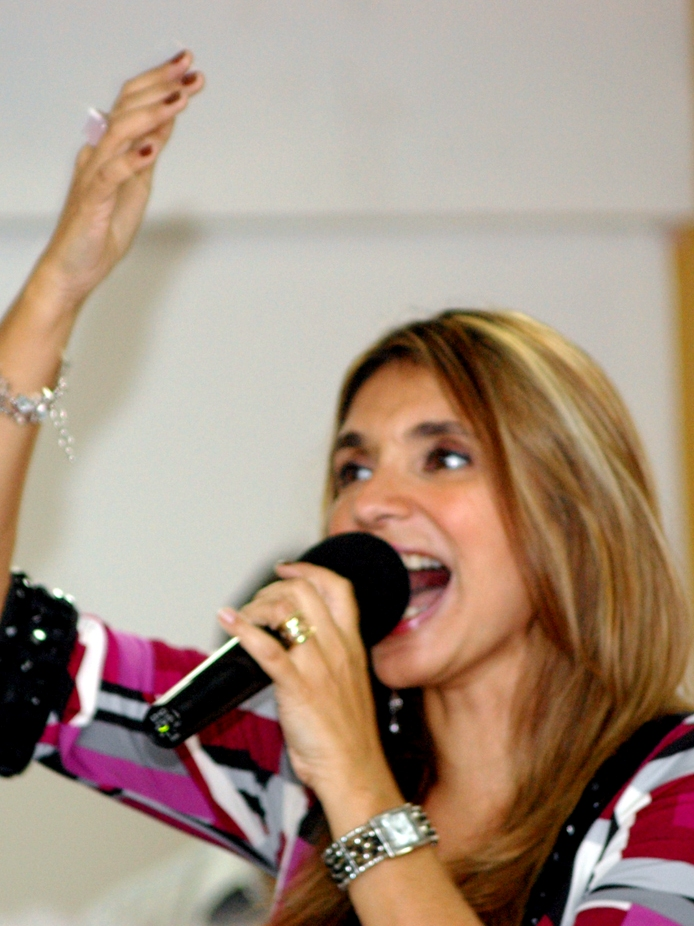
2008 winner Soraya Moraes was the first female winner in the category.

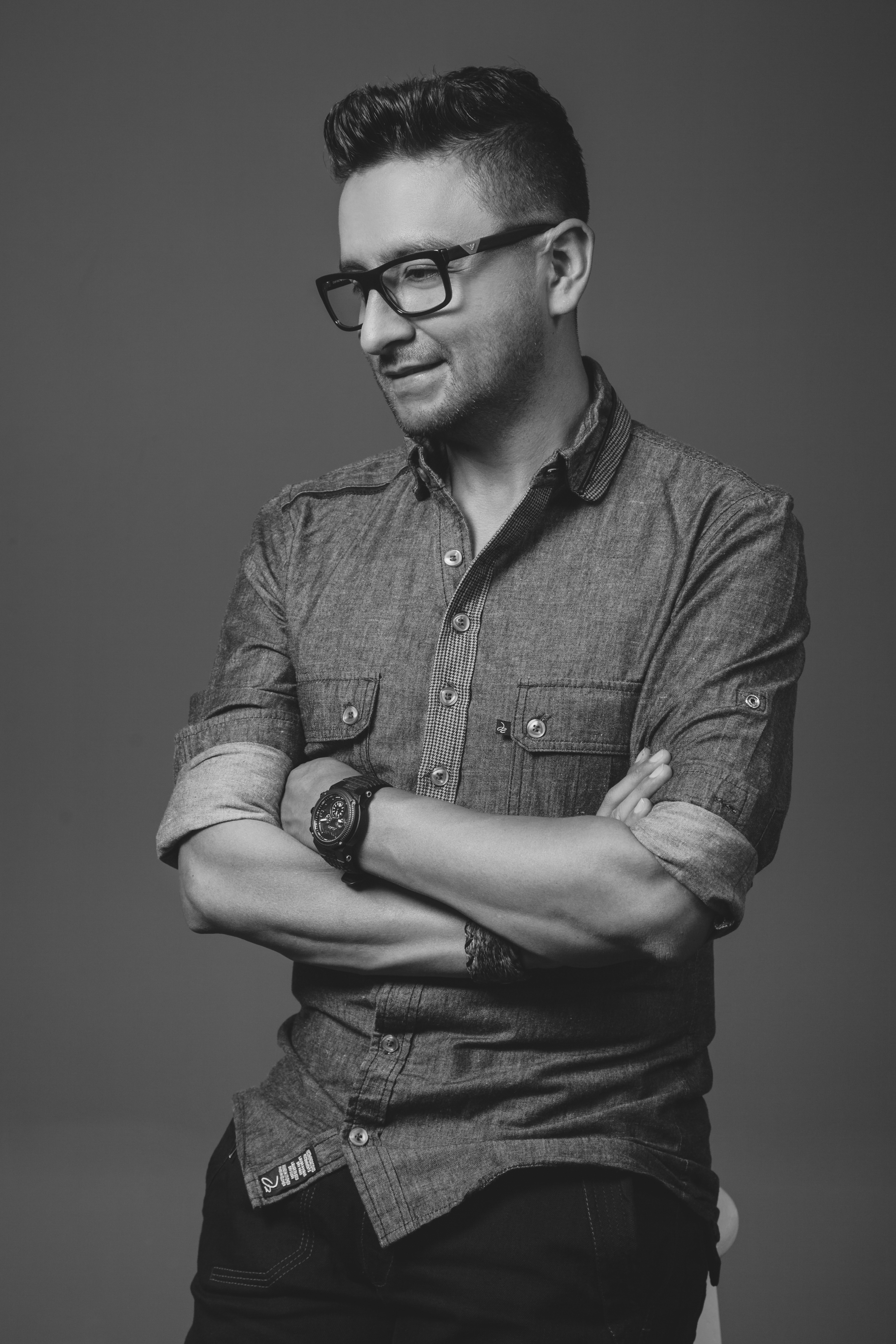
Colombian singer Alex Campos has won this award five times, in 2011, 2013, 2015, 2017 and 2020.

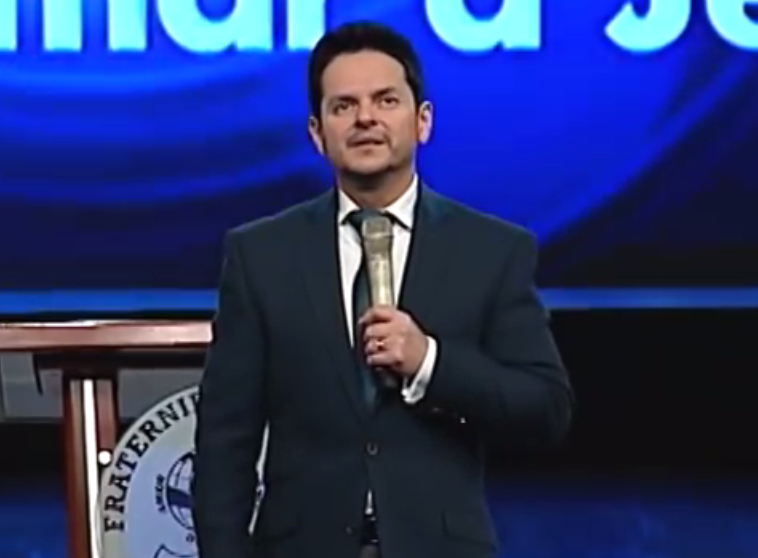
2014 winner Danilo Montero.

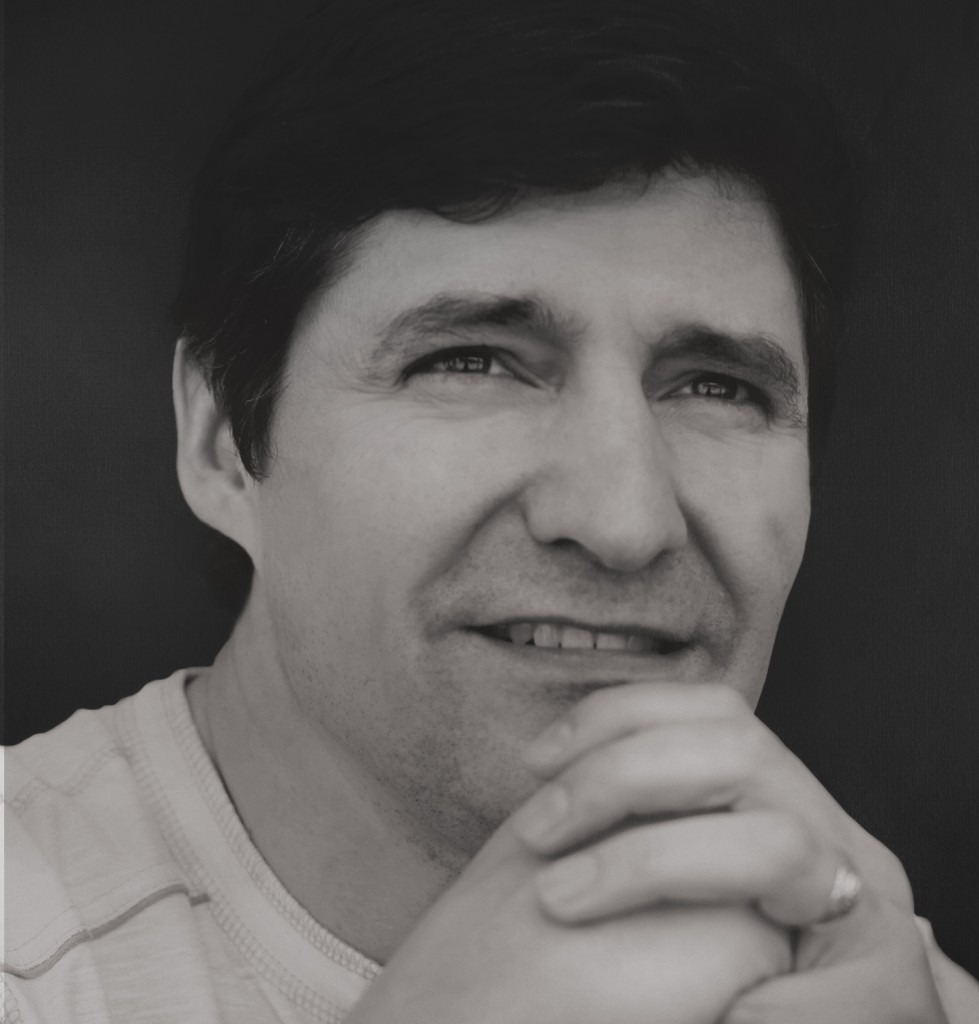
Two-time winner Marcos Vidal.

=== Best Christian Album ===
Year	Performing artist(s)	Work	Nominees	Ref.
2002	Padre Marcelo Rossi	Paz - Ao Vivo	Ileana Garcés – El Amor Tiene Un Valor; Roberto Orellana – Mi Nuevo Amor; Rabito – Viva La Vida; 33 DC – Ven, Es Tiempo de Adorarle	
2003	Marcos Witt	Sana Nuestra Tierra	Patty Cabrera – Amar A Alguien Como Yo; Funky – Funkytown; Annette Moreno & Jardín – Un Ángel Llora; Perucho – Almas Unidas	

=== Best Christian Album (Spanish Language) ===
Year	Performing artist(s)	Work	Nominees	Ref.
2004	Marcos Witt	Recordando Otra Vez	Carlos Guzman – En las Alas de Una Paloma; Samuel Hernández – Jesús Siempre Llega A Tiempo; Rojo – 24/7; Coalo Zamorano – Cosas Poderosas	
2005	Juan Luis Guerra 440	Para Ti	Marco Barrientos – Viento Mas Fuego; Pablo Olivares – Luz en Mi Vida; Rojo – Día de Independencia; Marcos Witt – Tiempo de Navidad	
2006	Marcos Witt	Dios es Bueno	Aline Barros – Aline; Daniel Calveti – Vivo Para Ti; Jesus Adrian Romero – El Aire de tu Casa	
2007	Marcos Witt	Alegría	Blest – Palabras del Alma; Daniel Calveti – Un Día Más; Pablo Olivares – Voy A Entregar Mi Corazón; Pamela – En Español; Paulina Aguirre – Mujer de Fe; Rojo – Con El Corazón En La Mano	
2008	Soraya Moraes	Tengo Sed de Tí	Aline Barros – Refréscate!; Alex Campos – Cuidaré de Ti; Jesus Adrian Romero – Ayer Te Ví... Fue Más Claro Que La Luna; Marcos Witt – Sinfonía del Alma	
2009	Paulina Aguirre	Esperando Tu Voz	Lucía Parker – Alabanza Y Adoración: Del Corazón; Promissa – Poquito A Poco; David Velásquez – Su Trayectoria; Alan Villatoro Tuyo Soy	
2010	Mónica Rodríguez	Tienes Que Creer	Alex Campos – Te Puedo Sentir; Danilo Montero – Devoción; Rojo – Apasionado Por Tí; Jesus Adrian Romero – El Brillo de Mis Ojos; Álvaro Torres – Muy Personal	
2011	Alex Campos	Lenguage De Amor	Moisés Angulo – Alegrense!; Marco Barrientos – Transformados; Funky – Reset; Ingrid Rosario – Cuan Gran Amor; Tercer Cielo – Viaje a las estrellas; Giuseppe Davi – Amor Y Nada mas	
2012	Marcos Witt	25 Concierto Conmemorativo	Paulina Aguirre – Rompe El Silencio; Carlos Carcache – Aquí En Tu Presencia; Generasion – Generasion Soy Yo; Jacobo Ramos – Dile Al Corazón Que Camine; Tercer Cielo – Lo Que El Viento Me Enseñó	
2013	Alex Campos	Regreso A Ti	Daniel Calveti – Mi Refugio; Lilly Goodman – Amor Favor Gracia; Mónica – Encontré Su Amor; Marcos Vidal – Tu Nombre	
2014	Danilo Montero	La Carta Perfecta - En Vivo	Amor Mercy – Desde Arriba Todo Se Ve Differente; Lenny Salcedo – Nuevo; Nirlon Sánchez – Es El Tiempo De Dios; Marcos Vidal – Sigo Esperándote; Marcos Witt – Sigues Siendo Dios; Coalo Zamorano – Confesiones De Un Corazón Agradecido	
2015	Alex Campos	Derroche de Amor	Marco Barrientos – Amanece; Emmanuel Y Linda – Voy Tras de Ti con Todo; Son by Four – Mujer Frente a La Cruz; Tercer Cielo – Irreversible	
2016	Marcos Vidal	25 Años	Christine D'Clario – Eterno (Live); Generasion – Ciudad de Luz; Alex Sampedro – Alex Sampedro; Emir Sensini – Deseo tu Gloria	
2017	Alex Campos	Momentos	Barak – Generación Radical; Gabriela Cartulano – Tu Amor; Álvaro López and ResQBand – Sol Detente; Jaci Velasquez – Confío	
2018	Alfareros	Setenta Veces Siete	Andy Alemany – Tú Primero; Daniel Calveti – Habla Sobre Mí; Marcela Gándara – Cerca Estás; Miel San Marcos – Pentecostés (En Vivo)	
2019	Juan Delgado	Todo Pasa	Danilo Montero – Mi Viaje (Live); Gabriela Soto and Big Band – Lluvias De Bendición; Ricardo Torres y Su Mariachi – Padre Mio; Alex Zurdo – ¿Quién Contra Nosotros?	
2020	Alex Campos	Soldados	Tony Alonso – Caminemos con Jesús; Amalfi – Único; Arthur Callazans – Atmósfera; Gilberto Daza – ¿Quién Dijo Miedo?; Elevation Worship – A La Medianoche; Hillsong Worship – Hay Más; Jesús Adrián Romero – Origen y Esencia	
2021	Aroddy	Ya Me Vi	Anagrace – Hora Dorada; Aline Barros – Redención; Majo y Dan – Vida Encontré; William Perdomo – Milagro de Amar	
2022	Marcos Witt	Viviré	Aroddy – Ya Llegó la Primavera; Athenas – Alfa y Omega; Gilberto Daza – ¿Quién Dijo Miedo? (Live); Jesús Adrián Romero – ¿Cómo Me Ves?	
2023	Marcos Vidal	Lo Que Vemos	Barak – Fuego & Poder (Live); Alex Campos – Vida; Gilberto Daza & Sergio Luis Rodríguez – El Vallenato Se Hizo en el Cielo; Jesús Israel – Hazme Caminar; Jesús Adrián Romero – El Cielo Aún Espera	
2024	Un Corazón	Kintsugi	Jesús Israel – Necesito de Ti; Majo y Dan – No Yo, Sino Cristo; Redimi2 – Maverick; Marcos Witt – Tu Iglesia	
2025	Marcos Witt	Legado	Marco Barrientos – Exaltado; Christine D'Clario – La Novia; Israel & New Breed – Coritos Vol. 1; Marcos Vidal – Aquí Estamos	
