= Latin Christian music =

Fusion of Latin music and various forms of modern Christian music

- Stylistic origins: Latin music; Christian music; música del Evangelio(gospel music)
- Cultural origins: Early 1980s

Subgenres
- Urbano Christian music(música urbano cristiano); Latin Contemporary worship music; Christian Reggaeton; Latin Christian hip hop; Christian Mexican regional music; Christian tropical music

Latin Christian music (Spanish: Musica Cristiana Latina) is a subgenre of Latin music and Contemporary Christian music. Christian music is well established in Latin America's Evangelical churches, but is also popular with the major Catholic community. Both the Latin Grammy Awards and Latin Billboard Music Awards have Christian music categories, (e.g. Latin Grammy Award for Best Christian Album (Spanish Language)), though the markets are often underestimated due to low reporting.

== Latin American artists ==
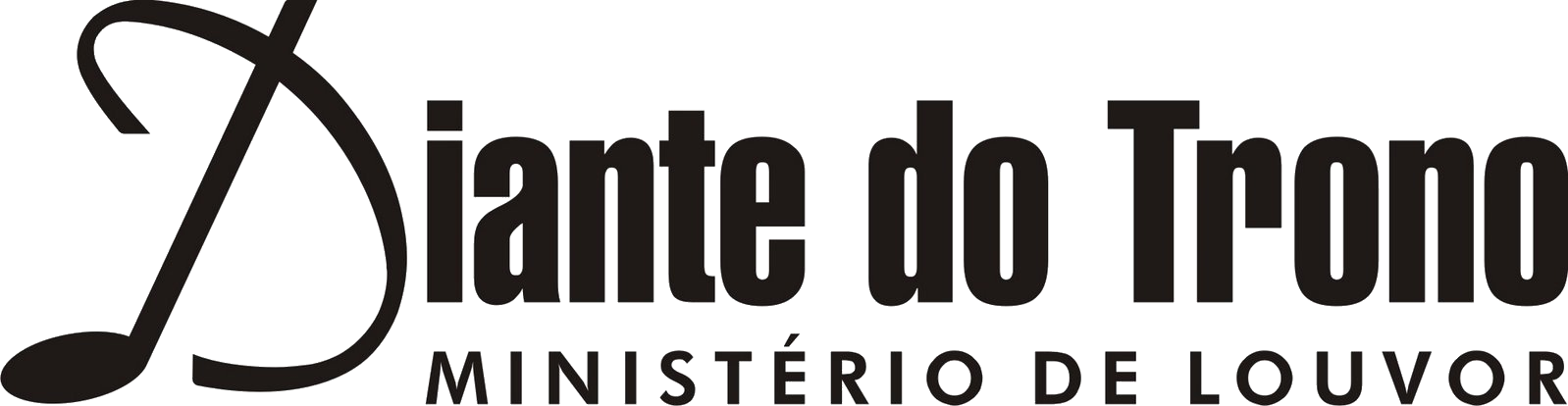
Diante do Trono, a major worship ministry in Latin America

Notable artists include Brazilian singers Ana Paula Valadão and Aline Barros, Panamanian musician Santiago Stevenson (d. 2007), Jaime Murrell, Luis "Funky" Marrero, Puerto Rican rapper in the genre of hip-hop, reggaeton, and Christian contemporary music, Willy Redimi2 González Dominican rapper in Latin hip-hop, trap, and Christian contemporary music, Venezuelan pop singer José Luis Rodríguez, Daniel Calveti and Christian Sebastia, Mexican singers/pastors Jesús Adrián Romero, Marcos Witt, and Armando Flores, and singers Alejandro Alonso (musician), Marco Barrientos, Ecuador's Paulina Aguirre, Salvadorian Álvaro Torres, Colombia's Alex Campos and Ericson Molano, and Mexican band Rojo. Other artists include Samuel Hernández, Roberto Orellana, Annette Moreno, and Christian singers like Daniela G Mangrum.

== American Latin artists ==
US artists include Texas-based singers Jaci Velasquez, Javier Molina, and Omar Salas, California-based Martin Cantu, New Jersey-born musician Anthony Rodriguez and New York-born Christian pop artist Jon Montalban. A group called The Latinos were active in the 1960s, largely using English language.

== In Europe ==
Spain and Portugal also have their own local Christian music artists. Notable in Portugal is Catholic minister Padre José Luis Borga.
