= Coalo Zamorano =

Mexican christian singer-songwriter (born 1972)

- Born: Jorge Clodoaldo Zamorano; October 26, 1972 (age 54); Guadalajara, Mexico
- Occupations: Singer, composer, record producer
- Instruments: Vocals, piano, guitar
- Years active: 1991–present
- Label: CanZion Group LP

Jorge Clodoaldo Zamorano (born October 26, 1972), better known as simply Coalo Zamorano, is a Mexican singer, musician, composer and record producer of contemporary Christian music. He was part of the group VCV, and later, as a soloist, he relaunched his career where he has been nominated for the Latin Grammy Awards and Arpa Awards on various occasions.

His career includes participation as a producer, composer and singer in more than 50 Christian music productions by prominent artists such as Marcos Witt, Alex Campos, Israel Houghton, Danilo Montero, Jesús Adrián Romero, Miel San Marcos, Juan Carlos Alvarado, Marco Barrientos, Jacobo Ramos, Edgar Rocha, Jaime Murrell, Daniel Calveti, Jorge Lozano, among others. Some of the albums in which he participated have become well-known and true worship classics in many Spanish-speaking Christian churches, such as "Poderoso" (1993), "Alabadle!" (1994) and "Enciende Una Luz" (1999) by Marcos Witt and "Eres Todopoderoso" (1999) by Danilo Montero, among others.

Parallel to his work in CanZion, he led the Christian rock band VCV, with which he released his first album in 1998, titled “VCV 1.0-Vida Camino Verdad”. In 2001, he released his second CD, titled "VCV 2.0 QHE?-Qué Haría Él?". As a soloist, his productions have entered the Billboard Latin Pop Albums list twice, with Mas Fuerte Que Ahora and Confesiones De Un Corazón Agradecido.

== Biography ==
Born in Guadalajara, in the Mexican state of Jalisco, Coalo Zamorano is the third of four siblings, born from the marriage between Juan and Laura Zamorano. In 1986, the Zamorano family moved to Durango, in the midst of a strong family crisis. In this same city, Coalo and his family were evangelized by his neighbor, Marcos Witt, so his mother converted to the gospel, beginning to attend the Bethel Church. Accompanying his mother at Bethel Church, he also converted to the gospel. In 1994, Coalo married Lorena Warren, Marcos Witt's sister on his mother's side, and they have two daughters: Lorene and Rebeca.

Years later, through his friendship and his closeness to Marcos' ministry, Coalo began to awaken his own musical talents. The friendship also led him to learn about the activities of the CanZion record label, owned by Marcos Witt.

== Discography ==
=== With V.C.V. ===
- VCV 1.0 - Vida, Camino, Verdad (1998)
- VCV 2.0 - QHE (¿Qué Haría Él?) (2000)

=== Soloist career ===
==== Studio albums ====
- Mi confianza esta en ti (2009)
- Confesiones de un corazón agradecido (2014)

==== Live albums ====
- Cosas poderosas (2004)
- Eres mi pasión (2006)
- Más fuerte que nunca (2011)
- Gloria Sea a Ti (2020)

==== Compilations ====
- Sesiones orgánicas (2016)

== Awards ==
- 2004: Latin Grammy for Best Children's Album with the album Niños Adorando 2, as producer, in 2004.
- 2009: Arpa Awards with Mi Confianza Está En Ti as "Best Male Vocal Album".
- 2012: Arpa Award for "Best Rock Album" for Más Fuerte Que Nunca.
- 2014: Latin Grammy for "Best Christian Album in Spanish" for Confesiones De Un Corazón Agradecido and as producer of Danilo Montero's album, La Carta Perfecta (Nominated).
- 2016: Arpa Award for "Best producer of the year" with the album Sesiones Orgánicas.
