= CanZion Group LP =

Mexican Christian music company

Grupo CanZion
- Formerly: CanZion Producciones
- Industry: Music; Entertainment
- Founded: April 1987; 39 years ago
- Headquarters: Monterrey, México
- Area served: Worldwide
- Key people: Abraham Díaz (CEO)
- Products: Music and entertainment
- Divisions: CanZion; CanZion Films; CanZion Editora; Instituto CanZion; Director de Alabanza; CanZion Home Media; CanZion Eventos
- Website: canzion.com

Grupo CanZion is an independent Christian music distribution and producer company, founded by Marcos Witt and his wife in 1987. Its initial name was CanZion Producciones, later becoming a group of divisions dedicated to various markets, being integrated by the brands CanZion, CanZion Editora, CanZion Home Media, CanZion Films, CanZion Eventos, Instituto CanZion, and Director de Alabanza, where the record label is the most well-known segment of the conglomerate, since the artists belonging to it and their productions have been awarded in various ceremonies such as the Latin Grammy Awards, Arpa Awards, Billboard, among others, have also managed to enter Billboard magazine lists as Top Latin Albums and Latin Pop Albums.

== History ==
In April 1987, Marcos Witt founded "CanZion Producciones" in Durango, Mexico, together with his wife Miriam. Subsequently, expanding its scope, the audiovisual, literary and educational extensions have arrived, with the brands that today complement and comprise the CanZion Group LP.

=== CanZion: record label ===
The name CanZion, soon became synonymous with that movement, when producing and launching the popular series «En vivo», albums recorded in concert by singers such as Marco Barrientos, Danilo Montero, Jaime Murrell, Juan Carlos Alvarado and Jorge Lozano, among others. as well as Marcos Witt's own albums, which promoted the vision of a fresh worship ministry in the churches of Latin America. In order to have a greater reach in a younger audience, the divisions Pulso Records and Más Que Música were founded. To date, nine musical productions under the CanZion label have been awarded at the Latin GRAMMY, where Alex Campos and Marcos Witt have been the most honored throughout the gala as "Best Christian Album", in addition to other artists such as Coalo Zamorano, Daniel Calveti, Pablo Olivares, Jacobo Ramos, Mónica Rodríguez, Danilo Montero and Funky. For their part, at the Arpa Awards, they have also been recognized on multiple occasions as the "psalmists of CanZion", understanding the large number of artists who have passed through it.

In 2009, CanZion Integrity Distributions (CID) was born, as a strategic alliance made during Expolit 2009, where the news was announced that the Hispanic CanZion and the American Integrity would merge into a single company. At the time, the agreement contained the distribution of material from artists such as Marcos Witt, Danilo Montero, Aline Barros, Daniel Calveti, Alex Campos, Funky, and Julissa, and would relaunch the recent productions of each artist.

They also made distribution agreements with artists for short periods or specific regions, such as Unción Tropical, Lizzie Lizzie, T-Bone, Kyosko, Travy Joe, in the same way, they made alliances to be the record company in charge of bringing the audiovisual material of English-speaking bands, such as Planetshakers, Hillsong United in Spanish, and the other divisions of the band. Marcos said that the objective of these agreements is for the message to reach more countries.

CanZion has released two compilations called Series Hits, in its 2012 and 2013 editions. Currently, it continues to create these annual compilation editions through the label's YouTube channel.

=== CanZion Editora ===
CanZion Editora, a music publishing entity, responsible for the administration of copyright. It is responsible for managing author, distribution, and performer royalties. The artists who have their intellectual works managed by CanZion are Marcos Witt, Harold & Elena, the Montreal Band, Esperanza de Vida, among others.

=== CanZion Events ===
The CanZion division that organizes concerts and presentations throughout America, was called CanZion Eventos, who were in charge of the logistical details of said events with the label's artists, such as Marcos Witt, Daniel Calveti, Alex Campos, among others. One of the most important events held by the group is the Congreso Adoradores.

=== Instituto CanZion ===
Instituto Canzion, founded in 1994, is a school that prepares worship leaders and music ministers, present today in 23 nations of the world. Its initial name was CCDMAC (Centro de Capacitación y Dinámicas Musicales, A.C.). Currently, it has offices in Colombia, Argentina, Mexico, Venezuela, and the United States. For various courses, the artists of the label have been the content speakers. As a complement to this segment, LIDERE and Director of Praise worked at the beginning.

=== CanZion Films ===
Canzion Films, a production and distribution company founded in 2009, specializing in bringing faith-themed entertainment to theaters, films that are tools of inspiration, edification and teaching for the Hispanic Christian church in the United States and Latin America. CanZion Films has released films such as "Salvation Poem", "The Heart of Man", "Conqueror", and "The Pilgrim's Progress" in cartoons. Recently, he is collaborating with GlouCinema to release new content.

In 2016, they organized a campaign to raise funds in Ecuador, with the film God is not dead 2, contributing 50% of the value of the ticket to the film in Cinemark theaters.

=== CanZion Home Media ===
CanZion announced in 2015 the opening of a new division for the acquisition and development of an audiovisual catalog under the name CanZion Home Media. Originally called CanZion Digital, the company that developed "Nuhbe", the first digital download platform for Christian music in Spanish. In its catalog, Home Media offers films with faith values, as well as Christian music.

== Venues ==
Grupo CanZion has a presence in several Latin American countries, such as Colombia, Mexico, Argentina, Guatemala, Costa Rica, El Salvador, among others.
