= Lucía Parker =

Salvadoran singer-songwriter (born 1983)

- Born: Lucía Parker Salomón; January 29, 1983 (age 43); El Salvador
- Genres: Latin Christian, contemporary worship music, contemporary Christian music
- Occupations: Worship leader, songwriter, singer
- Instrument: Vocals
- Years active: 2000–present
- Labels: 3:16 Records, RGM New Breed, Bridge, Provident Label Group
- Website: luciaparker.com/es/biografia/

Lucía Parker Salomón (born January 29, 1983) is a Salvadoran Christian singer-songwriter and Christian worship leader. She is known for her singles and collaborations with other artists. She has been nominated for multiple Dove Awards, Latin Grammy Awards, and Arpa Awards. She has won Arpa Awards in 2014 for Best Christian Album, Best Music Video, and Best Song.

== Biography ==
Lucia Parker was born on January 29, 1983, in El Salvador, is the daughter of a pastor. She is married to Jake Solomon and together they have two twins; they live in Nashville, Tennessee.

== Musical career ==
After Parker was nominated for several awards for her work, she traveled from El Salvador to the United States in 2009, she and her husband traveled throughout Latin America and the United States while serving as a worship leader for some churches. Lucia joined other singers of Contemporary worship music, Aline Barros, Israel and New Breed, and Planetshakers to record musical projects in Spanish and Portuguese.

In 2014, Lucia Parker released the album Rey De Mi Universo, the album debuted at No. 18 on the Billboard "Latin Pop Albums" chart. In 2015, Lucia recorded the song "Me Amaste a Mí" feat. Christine D'Clario, also collaborated on the Spanish version of the song "En el Trono Está" (He Is on the Throne), originally composed in English by Jon Egan, Jason Ingram and Kari Jobe for the album Eterno (Eternal) Live. In 2017, she released the album REVIVE in Spanish and English with songs of praise and worship; she has also collaborated with Israel Houghton. In 2021, Lucia featured on the song Fe Y Asombro which Meredith Andrews released for the EP Faith And Wonder and for the album Ábrenos Los Cielos (Open the Heavens for Us).

== Awards and nominations ==
In 2009, Lucia Parker won a Arpa Awards (México, 2014) in the category: Best Christian Album (in Spanish) for the album Alabanza Y Adoración: Del Corazón.

In 2009, Lucía Parker was nominated for the 10th Annual Latin Grammy Awards in the category: Best Christian Album (in Spanish) for the album Alabanza Y Adoración: Del Corazón.

In 2014, Lucía Parker was nominated for the Premios ARPA (México, 2014) in the category: Album of the year for the album Rey De Mi Universo, won a Arpa Awards (México, 2014) in the Best Music Video category and Best Song in Participation: "Cielos De Color" featuring Israel Houghton and Redimi2.

In 2018, Lucía Parker was nominated for the Arpa Awards in the category: Best Female Vocal Album for the album Revive (Spanish).

== Discography ==
Most of the music albums have been released through the Bridge Music Label distributed by Provident Music Group.

- 2003: En Lo Secreto
- 2008: Alabanza y Adoración del Corazón
- 2008: Regalo de Navidad
- 2010: Christmas: A Love Story
- 2010: Navidad: Una Historia de Amor
- 2011: Everlasting Love
- 2014: Rey De Mi Universo
- 2017: Revive
- 2017: Revive (Spanish)
