= Marcos Witt =

American singer-songwriter (born 1962)

- Witt at the 2026 Latin Grammy Awards

Background information
- Born: May 19, 1962 (age 64); San Antonio, Texas, United States
- Occupations: Singer, pastor
- Instruments: Vocals, piano, percussion
- Years active: 1984–present
- Label: CanZion Group LP
- Website: marcoswitt.net

Jonathan Mark Witt Holder (born May 19, 1962), better known as simply Marcos Witt, is an American Christian singer and pastor. Witt is considered one of the most influential and famous Spanish speaking figures of Christian music.

== Biography ==
Witt was the second of three children born to Jerry and Nola Witt, a young American missionary couple. The Witt family moved to Durango, Mexico, in 1960 and started a missionary outreach. Jerry was killed when his small aircraft was shot down in 1964 while he was dropping gospels of St. John over small villages in Mexico. Nola Witt continued the mission work after his death. Some years later, she married Frank Warren. Together, they began to build new churches in Durango, Mexico. The couple had two children.

Witt's education began with basic studies at the American School of Durango. He then studied classical music at the University of Juarez (Durango, Mexico) and eventually started his theological studies at the International Bible College in San Antonio, Texas, where he earned a degree. Witt also received an M.A. from Oral Roberts University in Tulsa, Oklahoma.

== Career ==
In 1986, Witt founded CanZion Producciones when he recorded his first album, Canción a Dios. He has recorded 30 albums that are available on cassette, CD, and DVD. Witt has sold over 27,000,000 copies of his records in Mexico, the United States and Latin America.

In 1994, Witt founded CanZion Institute, a school dedicated to the preparation of worship leaders and music ministers. Twenty years later there are over 3,000 students attending the 28 campuses of the Institute in 10 different countries throughout the United States, Latin America, and Europe.

Witt has written ten books, including Adoremos, which has been translated to English, Portuguese, and French, and Qué hacemos con estos músicos, which has been translated into Portuguese. Between 2009 and 2012, more than 3,000,000 people attended Witt's concerts in some of the main venues of Latin America. Concerts have been held in such places as José Amalfitani Stadium in Argentina, Figali Convention Center in Panama, Estadio Cuscatlán in El Salvador, Estadio Monumental in Ecuador, Estadio El Campín in Colombia, Palacio de los Deportes and Estadio Azteca in México City.

In 2001, Witt received the Ritmo Latino Award by the People for his "outstanding musical career".

Starting in 2002, for ten years he served as pastor of the Spanish Christian congregation at the megachurch Lakewood Church in Houston, Texas. Witt has visited the White House for events as a representative of the evangelical Hispanic Community. As of 2023, Witt's music and outreach efforts have been credited as a factor behind the surging growth of Latino evangelicalism across the United States and Latin America.

Witt works with William Vanderbloemen as a strategic partner to his firm.

=== Latin Grammys ===
In total, Witt has received 6 Latin Grammy awards.

In September 2003, Witt received a Latin Grammy Award for Best Christian Album, for Sana Nuestra Tierra (Heal Our Land). In November of that same year, he recorded Recordando Otra Vez (Remembering Once Again) at the LA Sports Arena. This recording brought CanZion into the secular market because of its distribution agreement with Sony.In 2004, Marcos received his second Latin Grammy for Best Christian Album for Recordando Otra Vez. On November 2, 2006, Witt received his third Latin Grammy for Best Christian Album for his album Dios es Bueno (God is Good). On October 31, 2006, he released the album Alegría (Joy), which was recorded live in Chile. On April 26, 2007, Alegría won a Latin Billboard Award for Best Christian/Gospel Album of the Year. Witt's daughter, Elena Witt, sang "Cristo, Amante de mi Alma" on the album Alegria. On November 8, 2007, Witt received his fourth Latin Grammy for Best Christian Album for Alegría.On October 2, 2007, Witt released Sinfonía del Alma (Symphony from the Soul), which he recorded and dedicated to his stepfather who had died a year earlier. On November 15, 2012, Witt received his fifth Latin Grammy for Best Christian Album for his album 25 Concierto Conmemorativo (25 Memorial Concert). On 2021 Witt released Viviré for which he was awarded his sixth Latin Grammy for Best Christian Album.

== Personal life ==
In 1986, Marcos married Miriam Lee; they have four children. The couple's oldest child, Elena, is married to singer Harold Guerra, who is signed to CanZion Records, the recording company founded by Witt.

== Discography ==
| Year of Release | Title | Label |
|---|---|---|
| 1986 | Canción a Dios | CanZion |
| 1987 | Instrumento De Adoración | CanZion |
| 1988 | Adoremos! | CanZion; Sony Music |
| 1988 | Instrumento De Adoración II | CanZion |
| 1990 | Proyecto alabanza y adoración | CanZion; Word |
| 1991 | Tú y yo (En vivo) | CanZion; Word |
| 1991 | Marco Barrientos: En Tí (En vivo) | CanZion; Word |
| 1991 | Instrumento De Adoración III | CanZion |
| 1991 | A una voz (Con Torre Fuerte) | Vida |
| 1992 | Te Anhelo | CanZion; Word |
| 1992 | Te Exaltamos (En vivo) | Hosanna! Music |
| 1992 | José Luis Torres: Cantemos A Jesús (En vivo) | CanZion; Word |
| 1992 | Edgar Rocha: Escrito Está (En vivo) | CanZion; Word |
| 1993 | Grandes son tus maravillas (En vivo desde Miami con Jaime Murrell) | Vida |
| 1993 | Jorge Lozano: Celebra Victorioso (En vivo) | CanZion; Word |
| 1993 | Juan Carlos Alvarado: Tu Palabra (En vivo) | CanZion; Word |
| 1993 | Poderoso (En vivo) | CanZion |
| 1993 | Alcanzando a las naciones | CanZion |
| 1994 | Jaime Murrell: Cristo Reina (En vivo) | CanZion |
| 1994 | Celebracion de alabanza (En vivo) | CanZion |
| 1994 | Lo Mejor de Marcos | CanZion |
| 1994 | ¡Alabadle! (En vivo) | CanZion |
| 1995 | Recordando... Una misma senda | CanZion |
| 1995 | Vicente Montaño: Tiempo de Cambiar | CanZion |
| 1995 | Rudy Rodríguez: Aliento de adoración | CanZion |
| 1996 | Venció (En vivo) | CanZion |
| 1996 | Es Navidad | CanZion |
| 1997 | Israel (Con Miguel Cassina, Marcos Vidal, Marly McCall, Susana Allen, Héctor David, Steve Green, Yuri, Rodrigo Espinoza y Heriberto Hermosillo) | CanZion |
| 1997 | Canticos de adoración y alabanza para cumplidores de promesas (Con Jaime Murrell, Willie García, Frank Giraldo, Coalo Zamorano y Gadiel Espinoza) | Maranatha Music |
| 1998 | Preparad el camino (En vivo desde Jerusalén) | CanZion |
| 1998 | Lo Mejor de Instrumentales | CanZion |
| 1998 | Lo Mejor de Marcos II | CanZion |
| 1999 | Colección En Vivo | CanZion |
| 1999 | Enciende una luz (En vivo) | CanZion |
| 2000 | Homenaje a Jesús (En vivo con Marco Barrientos, Danilo Montero y Jorge Lozano) | CanZion |
| 2000 | Todos deben de saber (En vivo) | CanZion |
| 2000 | Venceu (En vivo) (En portugués) | CanZion |
| 2000 | El volverá (En vivo desde Jerusalén con Danilo Montero y Luis Enrique Espinosa) | CanZion |
| 2001 | Clamemos a Jesús (En vivo desde Zócalo de la Ciudad de México con Marco Barrientos, Jesús Adrián Romero, Roberto Torres, Alejandro Del Bosque, Carlos Arzola y Misael Jiménez) | Aliento Producciones |
| 2001 | Vivencias | CanZion |
| 2001 | Sana Nuestra Tierra (En vivo) | CanZion |
| 2001 | Dios al mundo amó (Con Rojo, Danilo Montero, Luis Enrique Espinosa, Jaime Murrell, VCV y Gamaliel Morán) | CanZion |
| 2001 | A viva voz | CanZion |
| 2001 | Juan Romero: Vol.1 | CanZion |
| 2002 | Ahora es el tiempo | CanZion |
| 2002 | El encuentro (En vivo) | CanZion |
| 2003 | Lo mejor de Marcos Witt III | CanZion |
| 2003 | Vicente Montaño: Abrázame | CanZion |
| 2003 | Dios de Pactos (En vivo desde Miami) | CanZion; Sony Discos |
| 2003 | Música para una vida con proposito | Vida Music |
| 2003 | Songs 4 Worship en Español | Integrity Music |
| 2003 | Amazing God (En vivo) (En inglés) | CanZion |
| 2004 | Israel 3 (Con Susana Allen, María Del Sol, Annette Moreno, Samuel Hernández, Jaime Murrell, Julissa, Michael Rodríguez, Al'x y Jonathan Settel) | CanZion |
| 2004 | Recordando Otra Vez (En vivo desde Los Ángeles, California) | CanZion |
| 2004 | Tiempo de Navidad | CanZion |
| 2004 | Antología | CanZion; Sony Discos |
| 2005 | Dios es Bueno (En vivo desde Puerto Rico) | CanZion |
| 2005 | Alex Campos: Como un niño | CanZion |
| 2005 | Solo adoración | CanZion |
| 2005 | Solo adoración 2 | CanZion |
| 2005 | Christmas Time (En inglés) | CanZion |
| 2006 | Alegría (En vivo desde Santiago de Chile) | CanZion |
| 2006 | Unción Tropical: Seguimos unidos | CanZion |
| 2006 | Alex Campos: Acústico: El sonido del silencio (En vivo) | CanZion |
| 2006 | Hay una respuesta | CanZion |
| 2007 | Sinfonía del alma | CanZion; Vene Music |
| 2008 | Sobrenatural (En vivo desde Bogotá, Colombia) | CanZion; Vene Music |
| 2008 | Songs 4 Worship en español: El poder de Tu Amor | Integrity Music |
| 2008 | Mario Rodríguez: Derrama de Tu Gloria | CanZion |
| 2009 | En adoración | CanZion; Vene Music |
| 2010 | Sólo para bebés | CanZion; Kids |
| 2011 | 25 Concierto Conmemorativo (En vivo) | CanZion |
| 2012 | Sesión Acústica | CanZion |
| 2012 | Global Project Español (Con Alex Campos, Marco Barrientos y Marcela Gándara) | CanZion; Hillsong Music |
| 2013 | Josué del Cid: Mis mejores días | CanZion |
| 2014 | Sigues Siendo Dios | CanZion |
| 2015 | Sigues siendo Dios (En vivo desde Argentina) | CanZion |
| 2016 | Montreal: Más color | CanZion |
| 2016 | Canción a Dios (Versión remasterizada) | CanZion |
| 2016 | Tú y yo (En vivo) (Versión remasterizada) | CanZion |
| 2017 | Jesús salva (En vivo desde Congreso Adoradores con Coalo Zamorano, Evan Craft, Harold y Elena, Josué Del Cid, Kelly Spyker y Un Corazón) | CanZion |
| 2021 | Viviré | CanZion |
| 2023 | Tu Iglesia | CanZion |
| 2025 | Legado | CanZion |

== Bibliography ==
- Adoremos. Editorial Caribe: Distributed by Editorial Betania, 1993, ISBN 0-88113-195-4
- Qué hacemos con estos músicos?. Editorial Caribe, 1995, ISBN 0-88113-160-1
- A Worship-Filled Life. Creation House, 1998, ISBN 0-88419-543-0
- Enciende Una Luz. Casa Creacion, 2000, ISBN 0-88419-559-7
- Cómo Ejercer la Verdadera Autoridad. Casa Creacion, 2002, ISBN 0-88419-816-2
- Decida Bien. Casa Creacion, 2003, ISBN 0-88419-869-3
- Dile adiós a tus temores . Atria Books, 2007, ISBN 978-0-7432-9087-6
- Los 8 habitos de los mejores líderes. Vida, 2014, ISBN 9780829765878

== Awards ==
=== Latin Grammy Awards ===
- 2003: Sana Nuestra Tierra – Best Christian Album
- 2004: Recordando Otra Vez – Best Christian Album (Spanish Language)
- 2006: Dios es Bueno – Best Christian Album (Spanish Language)
- 2007: Alegría – Best Christian Album (Spanish Language)
- 2012: 25 Concierto Conmemorativo – Best Christian Album (Spanish Language)
- 2022: Viviré – Best Christian Album (Spanish Language)
- 2025: Legado – Best Christian Album (Spanish Language)

=== GMA Dove Awards ===
| Year | Award | Result |
|---|---|---|
| 2005 | Spanish Album of the Year (Recordando Otra Vez) | Nominated |
| 2005 | Spanish Album of the Year (Tiempo de Navidad) | Nominated |
| 2006 | Spanish Album of the Year (Dios es Bueno) | Nominated |
| 2007 | Spanish Album of the Year (Alegría) | Nominated |
| 2009 | Spanish Album of the Year (Sobrenatural) | Nominated |
| 2022 | Spanish Album of the Year (Viviré) | Won |

=== AMCL Awards ===
- 1987: Vocalista Masculino del Año
- 1988: Artista del Año
- 1989: Artista del Año
- 1991: Tu y yo – Álbum Tradicional o popular del Año
- 1992: Cuan Hermoso – Canción del Año
- 1992: Te Anhelo – Álbum del Año
- 1992: Productor del Año
- 1995: Compositor del Año
- 1995: Productor del Año
- 1995: Temprano yo te buscare (en vivo) – Videoclip del Año
- 1992: Venció – Álbum en Vivo del Año
- 1996: Poderoso (en vivo) – Videoclip del Año
- 1997: Amo a Cristo (en vivo Argentina 1995) – Videoclip del Año
- 1998: Entrare a Jerusalem – Álbum Tradicional o Popular del Año
- 1999: Enciende una Luz – Álbum del Año
- 1999: Productor del Año
- 1999: Enciende una Luz – Videoclip del Año
- 2000: Homenaje a Jesus – Álbum en Vivo del Año
- 2001: El Volvera – Álbum en Vivo del Año
- 2004: Recordando Otra Vez – Álbum Tradicional o Popular del Año
- 2004: Autor de la poesía Intervención Musical del Año – dueto con Maria del Sol-
- 2006: Dios es Bueno – Álbum en Vivo del Año
- 2006: Lluvias de Ayer y Hoy – Álbum Tradicional o Popular del Año
- 2006: Dios es Bueno DVD – DVD del Año
- 2006: No es un Misterio Intervención Musical del Año – trio con Alex Campos y Coalo Zamorano-
- 2007: Sinfonía del Alma – Álbum Instrumental/Clásico/Coral del Año
- 2009: Sobrenatural DVD – DVD del Año
- 2009: Sobrenatural DVD – Tour del Año
- 2011: 25 Concierto Conmemorativo – Álbum en Vivo del Año
- 2011: 25 Concierto Conmemorativo – DVD del Año
- 2011: 25 Concierto Conmemorativo – Evento Musical del Año
