= Miel San Marcos =

Guatemalan Christian music group

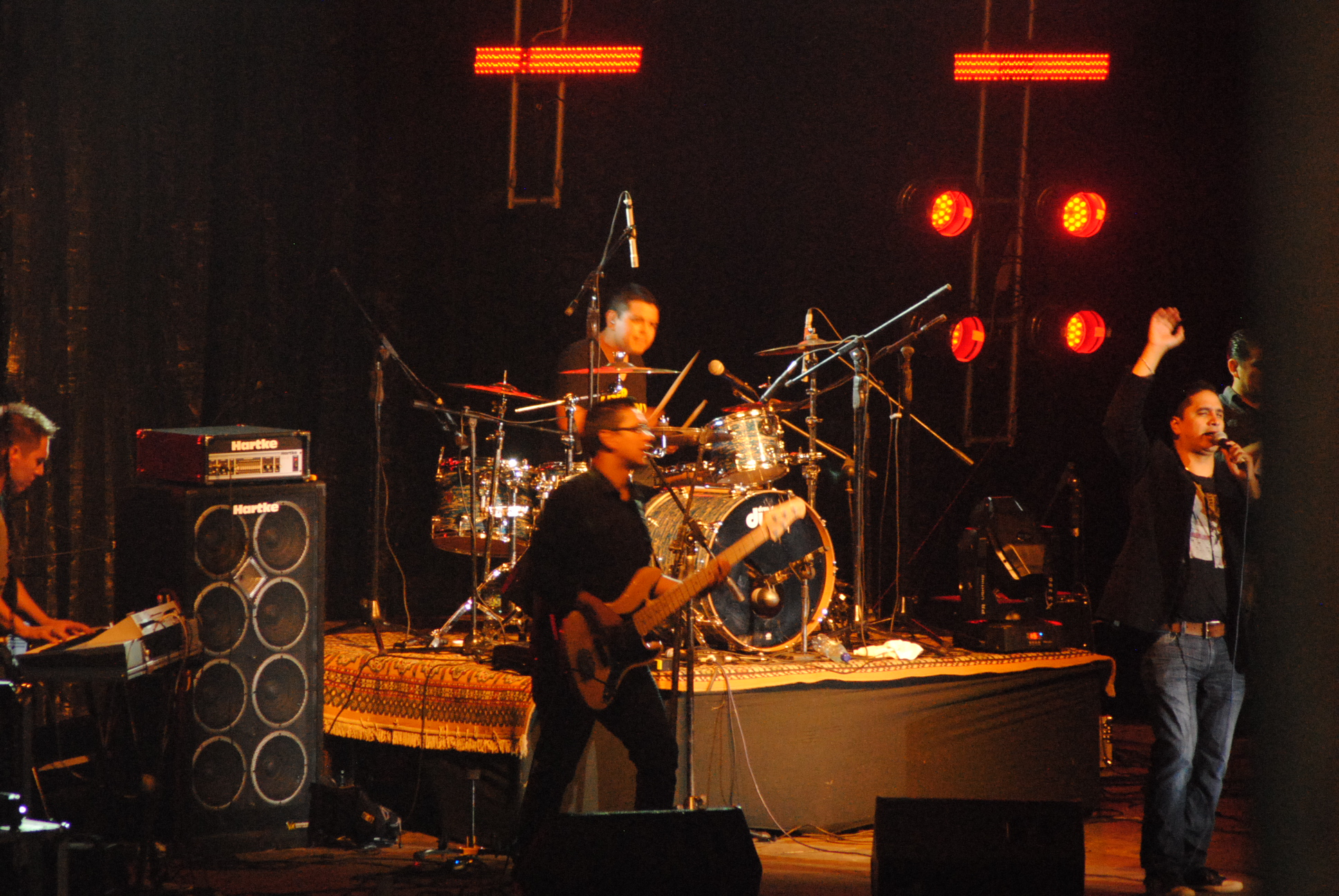
- Miel San Marcos playing in concert in 2012

Background information
- Origin: Guatemala
- Genres: Pop; Christian music
- Years active: 1998–present
- Members: Josué Morales; Samuel Morales; Luis Morales

Miel San Marcos is a Guatemalan Christian music group made up of the three brothers Josh, Luis and Samy Morales. The name "Miel" (in English meaning "honey") is derived from the initials of Elim Ministries (Ministerios Elim), the initial name of the Tabernacle of Avivamiento church, and San Marcos, by the name of the department in which it is located. All his albums have been recorded live, except, Tu Habitación, their first studio album.

The band Miel San Marcos has about a dozen musical productions, for some of which they have obtained awards at the Arpa Awards, Dove Awards, AMCL Awards, among others, in addition to nominations at the Latin Grammy Awards.

== Members ==
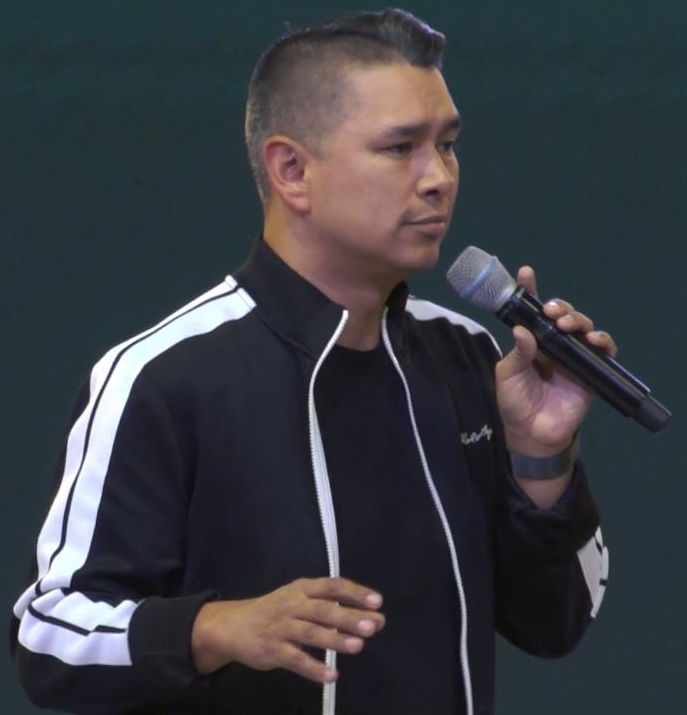
Luis Morales

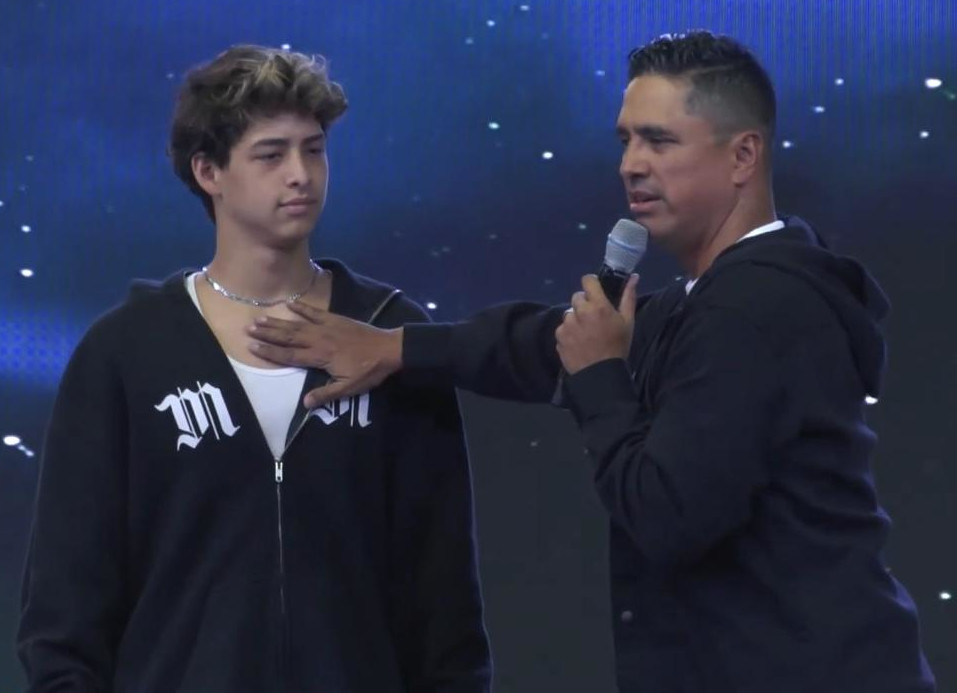
Josh Morales (right) alongside his nephew Matthew (left)

Josué “Josh” Morales: main vocalist of the band, was born on April 29, 1979. Josh is a singer and musician. He is also the author and composer of most of the group's songs.

Luis Morales Jr: born on December 5, 1981, is the group's vocalist. Additionally, he is the producer of the Miel San Marcos albums.

Samuel “Samy” Morales: he is the youngest of the brothers, he was born on August 30, 1983, and is the drummer of Miel San Marcos.

“Chris Rocha:” Guitarist

“Jonathan Ayestas:” Bassist

“Jorge Villatoro:” Keyboardist

== Musical career ==
It started in 1998 with their first album Bueno es Dios. In 2000, they released Viene por mí, in 2001, they released He ahí el Cordero, in 2002, Exáltate Señor, in 2003, Digno es Él, in 2005, Eres mi Dios, and in 2007, Dios es real. For 2008, they released a special production entitled Celebremos Miel San Marcos Kids which was followed by the 2010 album Avivamiento.

=== Proezas and Como en el Cielo (2012–2016) ===
For 2012, the album Proezas was recorded live, at the Anaheim Convention Center Arena, California, United States. This album had the special collaboration of renowned interpreters of Christian music such as Coalo Zamorano, Juan Carlos Alvarado, Fernel Monroy, Tony Pérez, and Ovidio Barrios.

The band made history with the international release of the album, and the event “Unidos por San Marcos” in front of more than 17000 assistants, at the Estadio Cementos Progreso in Guatemala, this for the recording of their new album titled Como en el Cielo, released in 2015. The release would be awarded as Best Album in Spanish at the GMA Dove Awards in 2015. In 2016, they would close this musical stage with Tu habitación, their first fully studio-recorded album that brought together well-known songs from the band.

=== Pentecostés: nominated for a Latin Grammy (2017–present) ===
In 2017, the band released Pentecostés (En Vivo), an album with 21 songs, more than an hour and a half of content. The production was recorded live at Madison Square Garden in New York, United States. By This album, the group received its first nomination at the Latin Grammy Awards in the category of Best Christian Album in Spanish.

Due to its recent popularity, the group had the opportunity to be the official band in Latin America to translate into Spanish multiple singles from well-known bands such as Newsboys ("God's Not Dead"), For King & Country ("Only God Knows"), Meredith Andrews ("Open Up The Heavens"), among other contributions.

In 2021, Mil Generaciones EP would arrive, an album in collaboration with Essential Worship, made up of musical themes from the American group but with new versions of the Guatemalan group. To close the year, their latest single would be "Dios es más grande" together with Danny Gokey, preparing for his next record production: Dios en Casa.

== Discography ==
- 1998: Bueno es Dios
- 2001: Viene por mí
- 2002: He ahí el Cordero
- 2003: Exáltate Señor
- 2004: Digno es Él
- 2006: Eres mi Dios
- 2008: Dios es Real
- 2008: Celebremos Miel San Marcos Kids
- 2010: Avivamiento
- 2012: Proezas
- 2015: Como en el Cielo
- 2016: Tu Habitación
- 2017: Pentecostés
- 2019: Ambientes De Adoración
- 2020: Mil Generaciones EP (with Essential Worship)
- 2022: Dios en Casa
- 2023: Evangelio
- 2023: Ambientes De Adoración, Vol. 2
- 2025: Dios De Generaciones
- 2026: Miel San Marcos 25 Años
