= Dios es Bueno =

Live album by Marcos Witt
- Released: September 20, 2005
- Recorded: June 18, 2005 at Coliseo Rubén Rodríguez de Bayamón in Puerto Rico
- Genres: Gospel & Religious
- Length: 65:52
- Labels: CanZion; Sony BMG/Norte
- Producers: Marcos Witt and Juan Salinas

Marcos Witt chronology
Antología (2004)	Dios es Bueno (2005)	Christmas Time (2005)

Professional ratings
Review scores
Source	Rating
Allmusic	3.5/5 stars

Dios es Bueno is the twenty-ninth album released by Marcos Witt. This album was recorded live in Puerto Rico. It also included a DVD which contains four music videos . This album was winner of the Latin Grammy and Billboard Music Award in the category of Best Christian album.

== Track listing ==
1. "Intro De Niños" — 00:52
2. "Mi Anhelo" (Marcos Witt) — 03:07
3. "¡Vengan Todos!" (Marcos Witt) — 03:37
4. "El Gozo Del Señor" (Marcos Witt) — 04:24
5. "Tengo Libertad" (Marcos Witt) — 05:23
6. "A Ti Sea La Gloria" (Coalo Zamorano) — 04:33
7. "¡Gloria!" (Edna Lorena, Gil Porras) — 07:42
8. "Es Por Tú Amor" (Alex Campos) — 06:59
9. "Tú Eres Fiel" (Marcos Witt) — 05:24
10. "Rey De Gloria" (Néstor Delgado, Arnoldo Ramirez) — 11:11
11. "En Los Montes, En Los Valles" (Feat. Funky) (Emmanuel Espinosa, Juan Salinas) — 05:26
12. "Dios Ha Sido Bueno" (Marcos Witt) — 07:18

DVD

- En Los Montes, En Los Valles
- Jesús Es El Señor
- Santa La Noche
- Gracias

== Personnel ==
- Nashville String Machine - strings
- Marcos Witt - piano, producer, liner notes
- Derrick Horne - arranger
- Juan Salinas - guitar, assistant, producer
- Milton Sesenton - arranger
- Dick Tunney - string director
- Sergio González - arranger
- James Hernández - trombone, arranger
- Junior Alvarado - Bass
- Gustavo López - trumpet
- Tony Rijos - guitar
- Eliud Velázquez - percussion
- Wiso Aponte - guitar
- Orlando Rodriguez - engineer, mixing
- Coalo Zamorano - chorus, mixing
- Hector "Perucho" Rivera - arranger, keyboards
- Lucy Esquilin - chorus
- Vanyo Esquilin - chorus
- Steven Monárrez - arranger, keyboard and synths on: "Tú Eres Fiel"
- Holger Fath - arranger
- Ismael Rivera - drums

== Charts ==
Chart (2005)	Peak position
US Top Latin Albums (Billboard)	38
US Top Christian Albums (Billboard)	46
US Latin Pop Albums (Billboard)	11

== Awards ==
In 2006, the album was nominated for a Dove Award for Spanish Album of the Year at the 37th GMA Dove Awards.
