= Santiago Stevenson =

- Born: Santiago Jose Stevenson Ortiz; 17 October 1928; Panama City, Panama
- Died: 3 June 2007 (aged 78)
- Other names: El Trovador Evangelico
- Occupation(s): Singer, composer, ordained minister

== Biography ==
Santiago Jose Stevenson Ortiz (October 17, 1928 – June 3, 2007) was born in Panama City, Panama. He was a singer, composer and ordained minister.

From an early age he felt motivated by singing, and began his musical Christian ministry at just 17 years old. He is considered a pioneer of the Christian music all over Latin America and awarded el "Arpa de Oro” in Miami, Florida in 1989.

The nickname “El Trovador Evangelico” was given to him by a radio program in a Christian broadcasting station in Panama City, where he worked as the Programming Director and Announcer for many years. He finished his career in English at the University of Panama, and later became high school English teacher, until he decided to resign to devote completely to the Christian music ministry.

He traveled all over Central, South and North America, and Europe, where he was presented as “El Trovador de las Americas”.

Married Eusebia Moreno in 1952, and had four children, five granddaughters and one grandson.

In 1999 he received a surprise tribute attended by many friends and Christian Panamanian artists, for his 52 years in the musical ministry.

== Discography ==
- Pero Queda Cristo (2002)
- America sera para Cristo (2000)
- Divino Compañero (2000)
- Melodias de Ayer y Hoy (1995)
- Jesus, Bella Flor (1989)
- El Rey ya viene (1978)
- Seré su amigo fiel (1978)
- Asi es el amor de Dios (1978)
- Un Pastor Amante (1978)
- Santiago en Puerto Rico (1976)
- La Voz del Evangelio (1970)
- Sendas Latinas (1970)
- Es Cristo Mi Todo (1970)
- Santiago Regresa (1962)
- Santiago Canta (1960)
