= Juan Carlos Alvarado (singer) =

Guatemalan singer (born 1964)

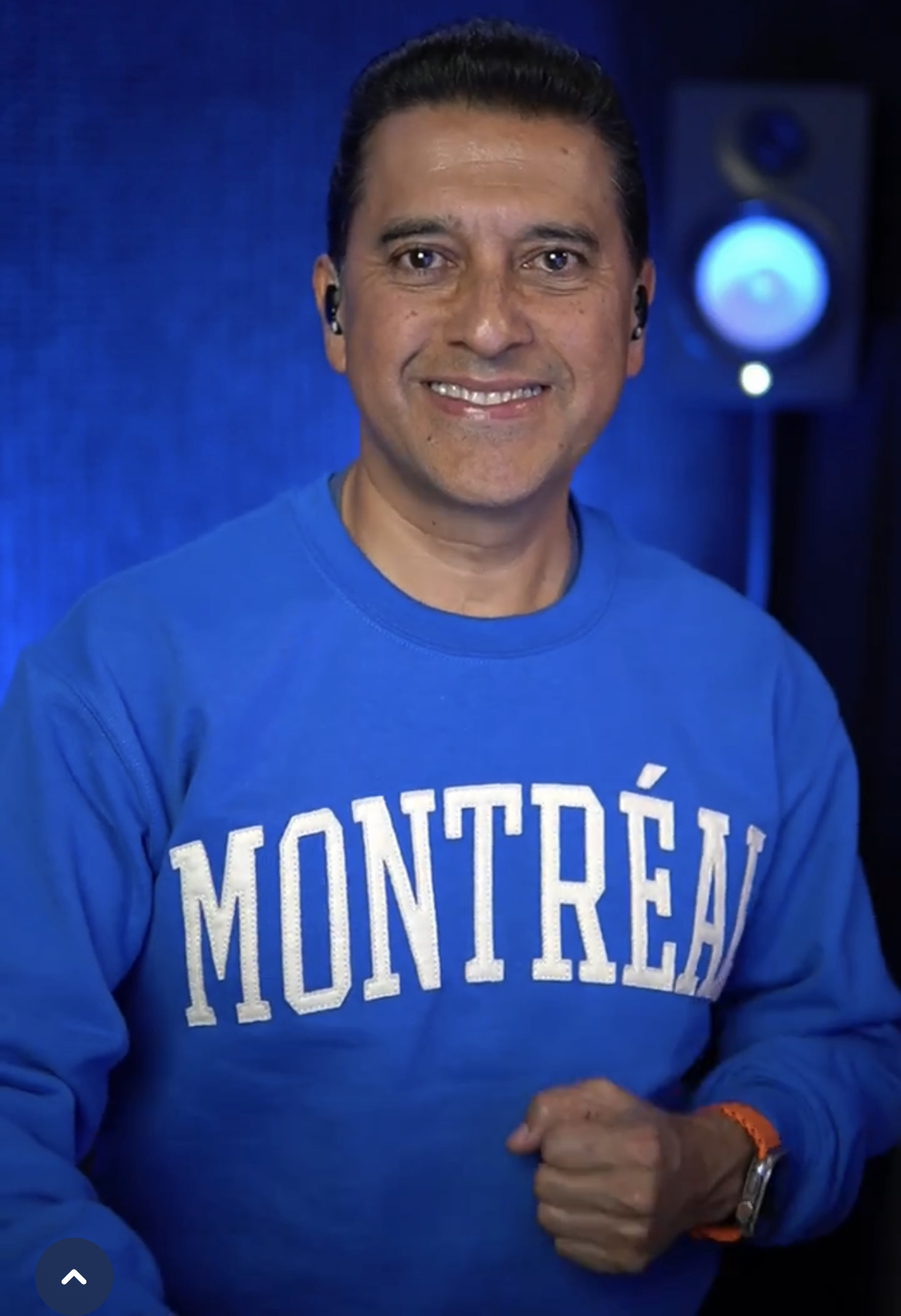
- Alvarado in 2023

Background information
- Born: December 28, 1964 (age 61); Guatemala
- Occupations: Singer; musician; songwriter
- Instruments: Vocals; piano; guitar
- Years active: 1980–present
- Labels: Fuego; Aleluya; Adoración Y Alabanza; Word; CanZion Group LP
- Website: juancarlosalvarado.com

Juan Carlos Alvarado (born December 28, 1964) is a Guatemalan Christian singer known for his songs such as Jehová es mi guerrero, Cristo no está muerto, No basta, Soy deudor, Cristo vive, Tu mano me sostiene, El borde de su manto, Mi mejor adoración, El poderoso de israel, Celebra victorioso, Dios el más grande, Santo es el señor, Pues tú glorioso eres señor, El señor es mi pastor, among others.

In 2021, he was nominated in two categories at the Arpa Awards 2021, such as "Composition of the Year" and "Best Male Vocal Album" for the single "El Dios De Israel Es Poderoso".

== Career ==
As a child Alvarado had a passion for singing and playing the piano. In 1987, Alvarado recorded his first album, Digno de alabar with the church Palabra En Acción. In 1993 Alvarado recorded his first "Solo" album entitled Aviva el fuego. A year later Alvarado recorded "León de Judá" as the Spanish version of Dave Bell's "Lion of Judah'' under Word Records, an American label. After the production of Aviva el Fuego, CanZion Producciones and Hosanna! Music worked together with Alvarado to produce Tu Palabra and Glorifícate consecutively in 1993. In 1996, Alvarado released "Hoy más que ayer". More recent releases include "Fuego" and "Tu palabra cantaré".

In 2019 the artist Kike Pavón decided to invite him to collaborate on his EP entitled "Ayer y Hoy", which paid tribute to songs and artists who were part of the renewing praise movement that was generated in Latin America, to perform "Mi Mejor Adoración", one of his songs with updated musical arrangements.

After more than ten years of his last production "Fuego", in 2020, Juan Carlos returns with a medley called "El Dios De Israel Es Poderoso" (in English, "The God of Israel is Powerful") containing 5 choruses, which were chosen for being well known in the eighties and nineties. Within this group of songs stands out "Son sus cuerdas de amor" (in English, "They are the strings of him"), which was composed and added based on Psalm 16. The audiovisual work is a musical single that refers to the album he is preparing entitled "Fuego 2". With this single, he was nominated in two categories at the Arpa Awards 2021, such as "Composition of the Year" and "Best Male Vocal Album".

== Discography ==
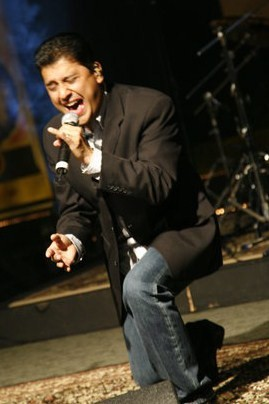
Alvarado performing

=== With Palabra En Acción ===
Year of release	Title
1987	Digno De Alabar
1988	Jehová Es Mi Guerrero
1989	Glorificad A Jehová
1990	Santo Es El Señor
1991	Más Que Vencedor

=== Solo ===
Year of release	Title	Label
1993	Aviva El Fuego	Adoración Y Alabanza Producciones; Word Records
1993	Tu Palabra	CanZion Producciones; Word Records
1994	Glorifícate	Hosanna! Music
1994	León De Judá	HeartCry; Word Records
1996	Hoy Más Que Ayer	Adoración Y Alabanza Producciones; Word Records
1999	Nunca Digas Nunca	Aleluya Records
1999	Colección 1	Aleluya Records
2000	Lo Mejor De Juan Carlos Alvarado En Palabra En Acción	Aleluya Records
2001	Vivo Para Cristo	Aleluya Records
2004	Fiesta	Aleluya Records
2006	Fuego	Aleluya Records; Universal Music Group
2006	Lo Mejor De Juan Carlos Alvarado En Palabra En Acción ll	Aleluya Records
2008	Tu Palabra Cantaré	Aleluya Records
2010	Momentos De Adoración	Aleluya Records
2025	Esencia	Fuego Music
