= Alegría (Marcos Witt album) =

Live album by Marcos Witt
- Released: October 31, 2006
- Recorded: June 17, 2006 at Arena Santiago in Santiago, Chile
- Genre: Gospel & Religious
- Length: 68:02
- Label: CanZion; Sony BMG/Norte
- Producer: Marcos Witt

Marcos Witt chronology
Christmas Time (2005)	Alegría (2006)	Sinfonía del Alma (2007)

Alegría is the thirtieth album released by Christian singer Marcos Witt. The album was recorded live from Santiago, Chile. This album was winner of the Latin Grammy and Billboard Music Award in the category of Best Christian album. Track number 10 was sung by his daughter, Elena Witt.

== Track listing ==
1. "Introducción" – 01:23
2. "Mira Nomas" – 03:29
3. "Aclama A Dios" – 03:15
4. "Alegré, Muy Alegré" – 03:44
5. "Sólo En Ti" – 04:20
6. "Tú Eres El Gozo" – 04:40
7. "Dios De Mi Salvación" – 07:35
8. "Tómame En Tus Brazos" (Feat. Luis Pedraza) – 05:56
9. "Presentación" – 00:48
10. "Cristo, Amante De Mi Alma" – 04:58
11. "Fuente De Vida" – 06:25
12. "Tú Me Haces Tan Feliz" – 06:48
13. "Con Todo El Gozo" – 05:03
14. "Vive Tu Alegría" (Feat. Luis Pedraza) – 06:03
15. "Poema De Salvación" (Bonus Track) – 03:41

== Awards ==
In 2007, Alegría was winner of the Latin Grammy and Billboard Music Award in the category of Best Christian album. It was also nominated for a Dove Award for Spanish Album of the Year at the 38th GMA Dove Awards.

== Credits ==
Buddy Skipper – Choir Arrangement
Marcos Witt – Producer
Sergio González – Arranger, Arreglos
Roberto Juan Martínez – Piano, Arranger
Marcos Lopez – Arreglos
Juan Sanchez Concha – Trombone
Orlando Rodriguez – Engineer, Mixing
Salvador González – Trombone
Allan Villatoro – Arranger, Keyboards
Pablo A. Medina – Vocals
Jorge Santos – Production Coordination
Laura Blanchet – Cover Design

== Charts ==
Chart (2007)	Peak position
US Latin Pop Albums (Billboard)	14
