= Recordando Otra Vez =

Live album by Marcos Witt
- Released: March 2, 2004
- Recorded: November 8, 2003 at L.A. Sports Arena in Los Angeles, California
- Genre: Gospel & religious
- Length: 63:21
- Label: CanZion, Sony BMG
- Producer: Marcos Witt and Juan Salinas

Marcos Witt chronology
Amazing God (2003)	Recordando Otra Vez (2004)	Tiempo de Navidad (2004)

Professional ratings
Review scores
Source	Rating
Cross Rhythms	8/10 stars

Recordando Otra Vez is the twenty-sixth album released by Christian singer Marcos Witt. The album was recorded live from Los Angeles, California and was winner of the Latin Grammy in the Category of Best Christian album. As of October 5, 2007, the album has been certified Platinum (Latin) by the RIAA.

== Track listing ==
• 01. "Cantando Alegre Seguiré" — 03:57

• 02. "Que Lindo Es Mí Cristo" — 03:57

• 03. "Súplica" (Featuring Gadiel Espinoza) — 05:42

• 04. "América Será Para Cristo" — 03:13

• 05. "Oh, Jesús Creo En Ti" — 05:15

• 06. "Quiero Cantar Una Linda Canción" — 03:20

• 07. "Peña De Horeb" (Featuring Ralphy Rodríguez) — 02:51

• 08. "Usa Mí Vida" (Featuring Gadiel Espinoza) — 04:25

• 09. "Bendice Hoy" (Featuring Vicente Motaño) — 04:43

• 10. "Solamente En Cristo" — 01:17

• 11. "Sólo Dios Hace Al Hombre Feliz" — 00:55

• 12. "Vamos Orando" — 01:11

• 13. "Siento El Fuego" — 01:42

• 14. "Le Voy A Cristo" — 03:33

• 15. "Te Tengo A Tí" — 05:11

• 16. "Ayer, Hoy Y Siempre" — 04:39

• 17. "He Decidido Seguir A Cristo" — 05:24

• 18. "Te Vengo A Decir" — 03:06

• 19. "Yo Te Busco" (Bonus Track) — 04:00

== Awards ==
In 2005, the album was nominated for a Dove Award for Spanish Album of the Year at the 36th GMA Dove Awards.

== Credits ==
Producers:

- Juan Salinas
- Marcos Witt

Executive producer:

- Marcos Witt
- Alfonso Ortiz - Executive Director

Arrangers:

- Wiso Aponte
- Mike Casteel
- Isaac Escamilla
- Holger Fath
- Joseph Garcia
- Jay Henry
- Russell Mauldin
- Chris McDonald
- Steven Monárrez
- Buddy Skipper

Worship leader:

- Marcos Witt

Musicians:

- Alex Acuña - percussion
- Randall Gonzalez - drums
- Holger Fath - electric guitar, acoustic guitar
- Randy Allison - saxophone
- Emmanuel Espinosa - bass, acoustic guitar
- The Nashville String Machine - strings
- Wiso Aponte - electric guitar, acoustic guitar
- Isaac Escamilla - keyboards]
- Jacob Garcia - sax (bass)
- Joseph Garcia accordion, upright bass
- Jay Henry - trombone
- Bob Martin - trumpet
- David Moreno - soloist, trumpet

Vocalists:

- Adriana Escamilla - vocals
- Gadiel Espinoza - vocals, guest appearance
- Vicente Montaño - vocals, guest appearance
- Ralphy Rodriguez - vocals guest appearance
- Nolita Theo - vocals
- Coalo Zamorano - vocals, guest appearance

Engineer:

- Orlando Rodriguez - engineer, mixing
- Héctor Sotelo - cover design
- Eddie Sakaki - photography
- Dick Tunney music advisor

== Charts ==
Chart (2004)	Peak position
US Top Latin Albums (Billboard)	50
US Latin Pop Albums (Billboard)	17

== Sales and certifications ==
Region	Certification	Certified units/sales
United States (RIAA)	Platinum (Latin)	100,000^{^}
^{^} Shipments figures based on certification alone.
