= Sana Nuestra Tierra =

Live album by Marcos Witt
- Released: 2001
- Recorded: Live in Houston, Texas
- Genre: Gospel & Religious
- Length: 72:23
- Label: CanZion
- Producer: Marcos Witt and Juan Salinas

Marcos Witt chronology
Vivencias (2001)	Sana Nuestra Tierra (2001)	El Encuentro (2002)

Professional ratings
Review scores
Source	Rating
Cross Rhythms	link

Sana Nuestra Tierra is the twenty-first album released by Christian singer Marcos Witt. The album was recorded live from Houston, Texas. This album was winner of the Latin Grammy for Best Christian album.

== Track listing ==
1. "Sánanos" - 06:53
2. "Sana Nuestra Tierra" - 06:13
3. "Mi Primer Amor" - 05:59
4. "Levántate Y Sálvame" - 09:16
5. "Las Naciones Proclamen" - 11:47
6. "Acuérdate Oh Señor" - 04:11
7. "Esperamos En Ti" - 06:53
8. "Grandes Cosas Ha Hecho El Señor" - 06:01
9. "Aleluya A Nuestro Dios" - 07:23
10. "Danzaré, Cantaré" - 07:52

== Credits ==
Producers:

- Juan Salinas
- Marcos Witt

Executive Producer:

- Marcos Witt

Arrangers:

- Isaac Escamilla
- Holger Fath
- Emmanuel Espinosa

Worship Leader:

- Marcos Witt

Musicians:

- Randall Gonzalez - Drums
- Holger Fath - Electric guitar, Acoustic Guitar
- Alan Villatoro - Keyboards
- Emmanuel Espinosa - Bass
- Wiso Aponte - Acoustic Guitar, Electric guitar
- Isaac Escamilla - Keyboards

Vocalists:

- Lucy Esquilin - Vocals
- Vanyo Esquilin - Vocals
- Nolita Theo - Vocals

Engineer:

- Orlando Rodriguez - Engineer, Mixing
- Alex Rodriguez - Assistant Mixing
- Hank Williams - Cover Design
- Ruth Salinas - Photography

== Lo Mejor de Marcos III ==
- "Mi Primer Amor"
- "Danzaré, Cantaré"
