= Arpa Awards =

Arpa Award
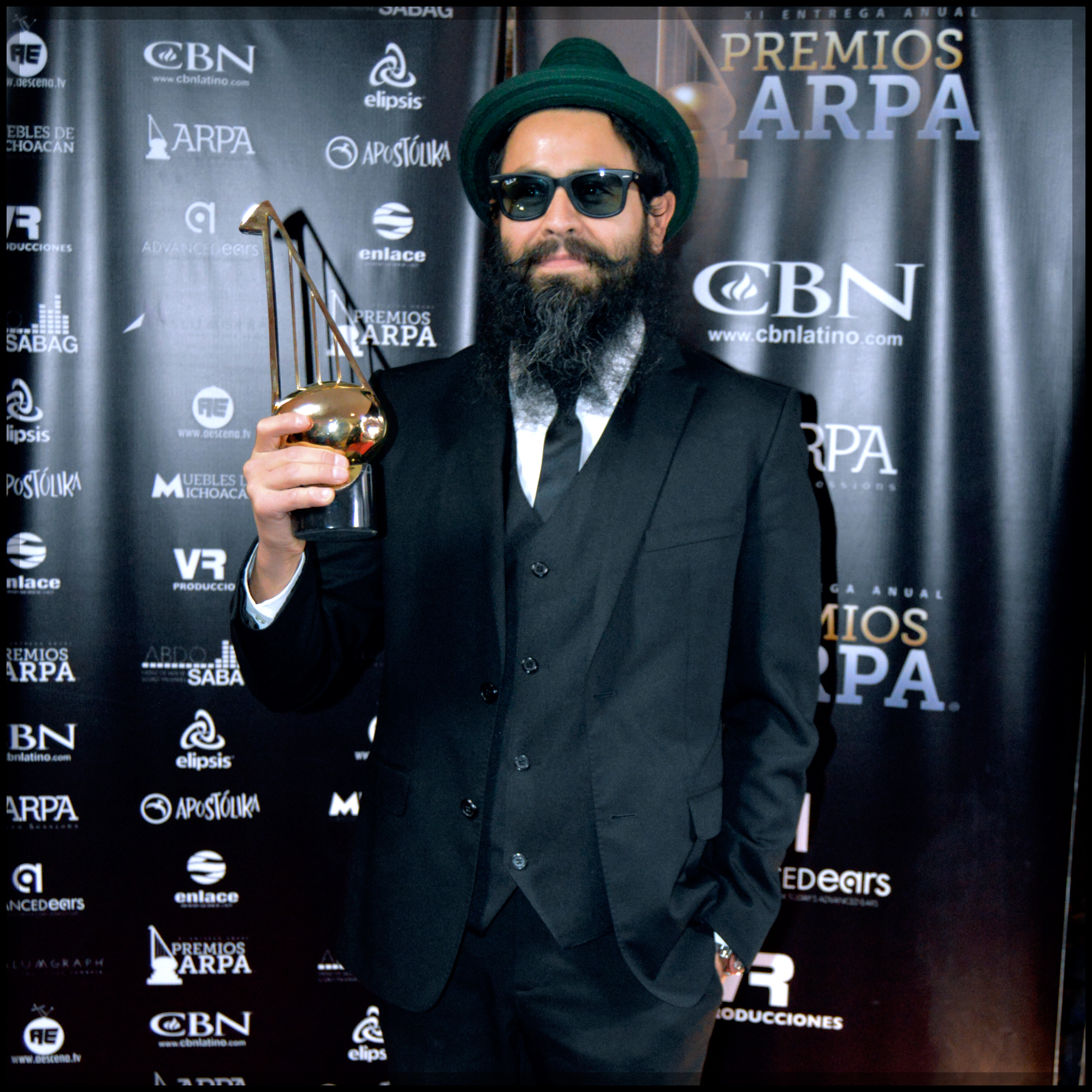
- Miguel Balboa with an Arpa Award
- Awarded for: Musical recognition of the work of contemporary Christian music artists, mainly Spanish-speaking
- Country: Mexico
- Presented by: Academia Nacional de la Música y las Artes Cristianas
- First award: October 12, 2003; 23 years ago
- Website: premiosarpa.org

The Arpa Awards, established in 2002 by the National Academy of Music and Christian Arts, are a ceremony of musical recognition of the work of contemporary Christian music artists, mainly of the Spanish language. The awards are presented each year during an official ceremony in Mexico. Winners receive an Arpa Award, one decides harp shape, a prize forged in bronze, with a weight of 2 kilograms and a height of 33 centimeters in the shape of a harp and a musical note.

== History ==
The National Academy of Music and Christian Arts (ANMAC) established the Arpa Awards in 2002 for Mexico. In 2003, the ANMAC held the first ceremony in its history in World Trade Center Mexico City. On October 23, 2009, the Arpa Awards celebrate a seventh edition at the National Auditorium of Mexico. On May 21, 2011, the Arpa Awards moved for the first time outside of Mexico and were held at the MACC Center in Miami, United States.

The Arpa Awards recognize artistic or technical merit, not sales or popularity; winners are determined by votes from qualified Academy members. Awarded based on the registrations of members and Christian record companies and the votes of active members of the academy, they serve as an example and inspiration to improve and promote Christian music in Spanish.

Since its foundation, the most winning artists of these awards have been Marcos Witt, Jesús Adrián Romero, Marcos Vidal, Grupo Rojo, Alex Campos, Coalo Zamorano, Danilo Montero, Daniel Calveti, Annette Moreno, Marco Barrientos, Tercer Cielo, Alex Zurdo, and Funky.

== Category ==
The Arpa Awards have 21 categories in 2019:

- Song of the Year
- Solo / Group Release of the Year
- Album of the year
- Live Album
- Classical / Instrumental / Choral Album
- Producer of the Year
- Regional / Tropical Album
- Composer of the Year
- Album of the year
- Male Vocal Album
- Cover design
- Female Vocal Album
- Music video
- Album of the year
- Rock album
- Live Rock Album
- Urban / Alternative Album
- Independent Album
- Songwriter Album
- Song in Participation
- Special Academy Award
