= Marcela Gándara =

Mexican musical artist (born 1983)

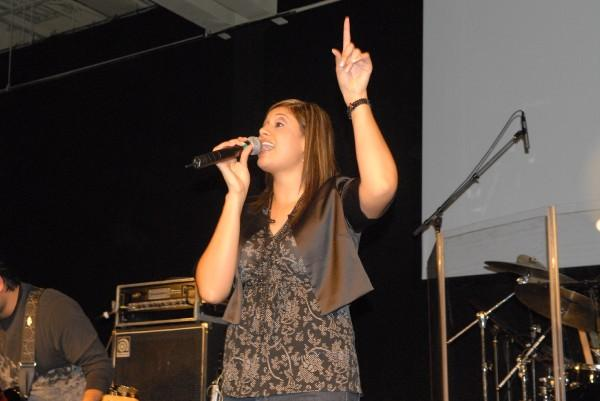
- Marcela Gándara in 2012

Background information
- Born: Marcela Gándara; 24 August 1983 (age 42); Ciudad Juárez, Chihuahua, Mexico
- Genres: Contemporary Christian music Gospel
- Occupation: Singer-songwriter
- Instrument: Vocals
- Years active: 2004 - present
- Labels: Independent; Vastago Producciones
- Website: marcelagandara.com

Marcela Gándara (born 24 August 1983) is a Mexican singer-songwriter of Christian music. To date she has produced 6 Christian albums in Spanish.

She began singing at an early age as it was one of her passions. At 18, she had the opportunity to enter an intensive biblical seminar, and there was where she decided to devote herself to Christian music. She was part of the worship team in her local church and then joined the choir.

Fellow Mexican singer Jesús Adrián Romero attended her congregation for a time and it was where they met. Marcela began in the music world by singing background vocals on various projects of Stem Productions, the label with which they would later work.

== Discography ==
- Más Que Un Anhelo (2006)
- El Mismo Cielo (2009)
- Live (2012)
- Cerca Estás (2017)

== Awards and nominations ==
Year	Award	Category	Nominated work	Result
2007	Arpa awards	Best female vocal album	Más que un anhelo	Nominated
2007	Arpa awards	Launch of the year	Más que un anhelo	Winner
2007	Arpa awards	Launch of the year	Más que un anhelo	Nominated
2013	Arpa awards	Best female vocal album	Marcela Gándara Live	Winner
2007	AMCL Awards	Sound quality of the album of the year	Más que un anhelo	Nominated
2007	AMCL Awards	Composition of the year	«Supe que me amabas»	Nominated
2007	AMCL Awards	New artist of the year	Marcela Gándara	Winner
2007	AMCL Awards	Revelation of the year song	Marcela Gándara	Winner
2007	AMCL Awards	Album revelation of the year	Más que un anhelo	Winner
2007	AMCL Awards	Cover for album of the year	Más que un anhelo	Nominated
2008	AMCL Awards	Christmas of the year album	Navidad con Vástago	Winner*
2009	AMCL Awards	Artist of the year	Marcela Gándara	Nominated
2009	AMCL Awards	Song of the year	«Ven»	Nominated
2009	AMCL Awards	Song of the year	«Contigo quiero caminar»	Nominated
2009	AMCL Awards	Album of the year	El mismo cielo	Winner
2009	AMCL Awards	Female vocalist of the year	Marcela Gándara	Nominated
2009	AMCL Awards	Sound quality of the album of the year	El mismo cielo	Nominated
2009	AMCL Awards	Composition of the year	«El mismo cielo»	Nominated
2009	AMCL Awards	Promotional song of the year	«Pensaba en ti»	Nominated
2009	AMCL Awards	Pop/contemporary song of the year	«El mismo cielo»	Winner
2009	AMCL Awards	Message of the year song	«Pensaba en ti»	Winner
2009	AMCL Awards	Album of the year live	Digno es el Señor (Edición especial)	Nominated
2010	AMCL Awards	Website of singer of the year	marcelagandara.com	Nominated
2012	AMCL Awards	Album of the year	Hillsong Global Project - Español	Nominated
2012	AMCL Awards	Female vocalist of the year	Marcela Gándara	Nominated
2012	AMCL Awards	Album of the year live	Live	Nominated
