= Christine D'Clario =

American singer (born 1982)

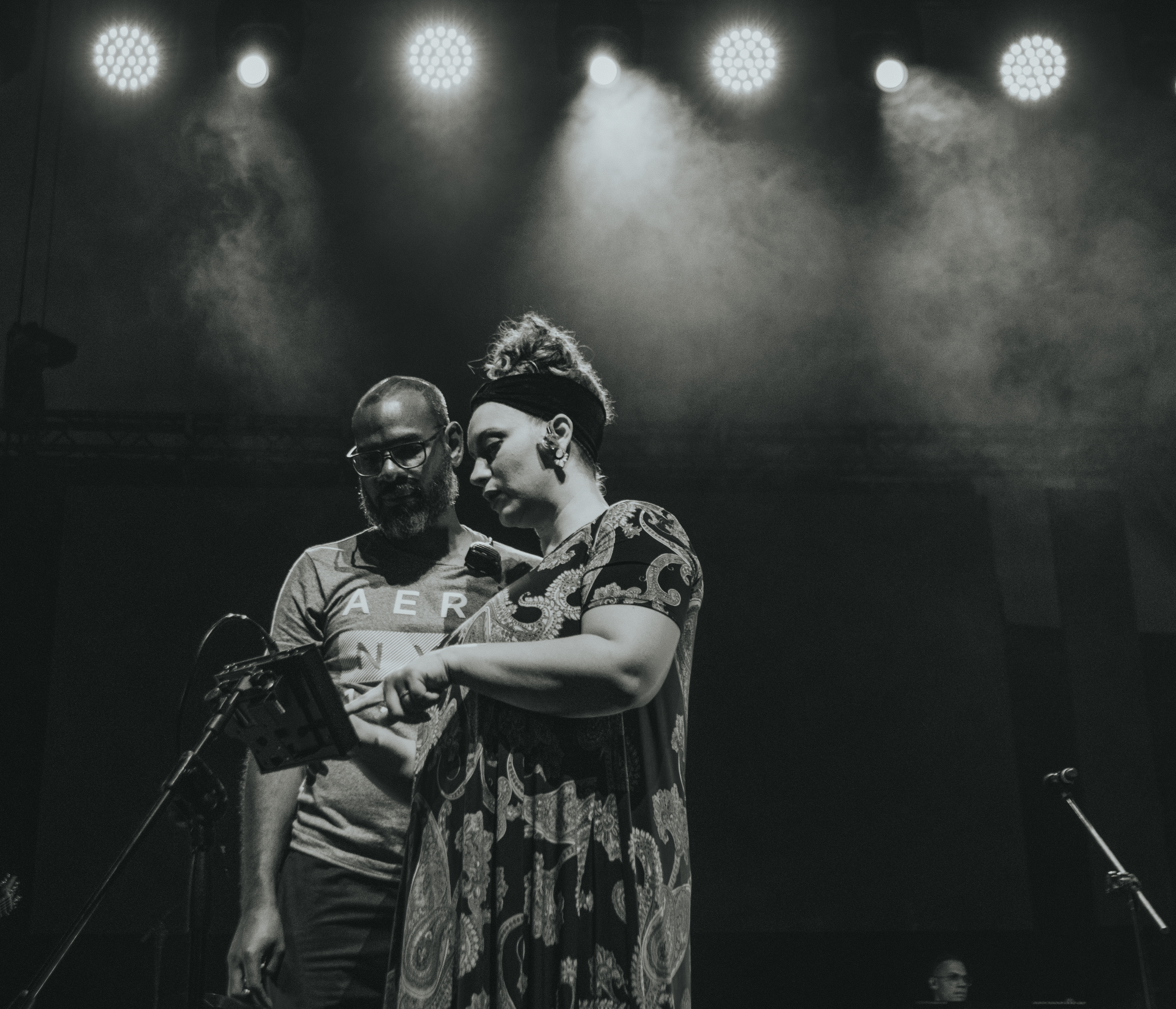
- Christine and Gio Durán in preparations before the concert, 2019

Background information
- Born: September 7, 1982 (age 44); Yonkers, New York, U.S.
- Origin: Dallas, Texas, U.S.
- Genres: Worship; Latin
- Occupations: Singer; songwriter; worship leader
- Instrument: Vocals
- Years active: 2005–present
- Label: Integrity
- Website: christinedclario.com

Christine D'Clario (born September 7, 1982) is an American Christian music singer, songwriter and worship leader, who plays contemporary worship music primarily for a Spanish-speaking audience. She has released eight albums: six in the Spanish-language and one in the English-language, Christine D'Clario (2005), Solo tú... lo único que quiero (2008), De Vuelta al Jardín (2011), Más Profundo and Deeper (2013), Eterno Live (2015), and Emanuel (2018). D'Clario has been nominated for two GMA Dove Awards.

== Early life ==
Christine D'Clario was born on September 7, 1982, in Yonkers, New York. After the death of her father, she moved to Puerto Rico with her mother's family when she was seven years old. She is fluent in English and Spanish. Years later she moved to Orlando, Florida to attend college at Full Sail University, while there she was mentored by William McDowell.

== Personal life ==
She is currently residing in Dallas, Texas, with her husband Carlos Caban and their children Ian Anthony Caban (April 12, 2017) and Kenzi Evangelina Caban (September 4, 2018).

== Music career ==
D'Clario began her music recording career with her eponymous debut studio album, Christine D'Clario. Produced by Wiso Aponte and the support of Christian singer Samuel Hernández, D'Clario's debut album was released in 2005, with her debut single "No me abandonarás" reaching the first positions in several stations in Puerto Rico, as well as the album's second single, "Eres mi fuerza" (with Jaime Barceló). In 2005, D'Clario won the Paoli Award for being the "Feminine Revelation of the Year" for her debut album.

Her second studio album, Solo tú... lo único que quiero, was released on June 7, 2008 by Integrity Music. The album was produced by Chris Rocha and it includes the songs "Padre Nuestro", "Crea en mí" and "Encenderé esta ciudad".

Three years later, on April 12, 2011, D'Clario released, De Vuelta al Jardín, with Integrity Music. This album got her first GMA Dove Award nomination in the Spanish Language Album category. De Vuelta al Jardín includes D'Clario's signature song "Como Dijiste", as well as the hit singles "Gloria en lo alto" and "Él nos ama".

In 2012, D'Clario began recordings for her fourth studio album, Más Profundo and Deeper. It was released on February 19, 2013, through Integrity Music. The album was also nominated for a GMA Dove Award for a Spanish Language album. This album charted on some US Billboard charts, where it peaked on the Top Latin Albums at number 48 and the Latin Pop Albums at number 17. Más Profundo contains the singles "Magnífico", "Rey" and "Seguirte" (with Marco Barrientos).

In 2014, her collaboration with Dominican rapper Redimi2, "El Nombre de Jesús" gained international success for both artists, reaching more than 150 millions of views on YouTube. Later, in 2015, D'Clario and Guatemalan band Miel San Marcos released the successful hit "No hay lugar más alto".

Following this, D'Clario released her first live album recording, Eterno Live. It was recorded in March 2015 and released by Integrity Music on September 10, 2015. The album includes the songs "En el trono está" and "Que se abra el cielo" (featuring Marcos Brunet), as well as live renditions from her previous hits. Eterno Live became D'Clario's most successful album on the US Billboard charts, reaching the top five on both the Top Latin Albums and Latin Pop Albums, peaking at number 5 and number 2, respectively. It also became D'Clario's first album to enter the US Christian Albums, peaking at number 30.

Following the release of Eterno Live, D'Clario appeared on several songs: "Tu eres Rey" with Barak, "Dios de lo Imposible" with Marco Barrientos and David Reyes, "Por la Eternidad" with Redimi2 and Julio Melgar, "Mi Libertador" with Miel San Marcos and "Lugar Secreto" with Gabriela Rocha.

On September 7, 2018, D'Clario released her second live album recording, Emanuel through Gracehouse. It includes the songs "Dios de Maravillas", "Rey de gloria", "Santo Santo" and "Admirable" with Julio Melgar. The album peaked at number 17 on the US Billboard Latin Pop Albums.

On January 10, 2020, she appeared in duet with Tauren Wells in his single "Tu poder (Yo creo en ti)" which is the Spanish version of his song "Famous For (I believe)". Later, on April 10, 2020, D'Clario released a new song, "Loco amor". Following this, it was released a Brazilian-language version of the song titled "Louco Amor", becoming D'Clario's first song recorded in Portuguese. Later, she released an English-Spanish version titled "Crazy Love".

On June 12, Christine D'Clario released her collaboration with Miel San Marcos, Mi Libertador.

In August 2024 Christine D'Clario released her album " La Novia."

== Discography ==
=== Albums ===
==== Spanish ====
List of albums, with selected chart positions
Title	Album details	Peak chart positions		
Title	Album details	US Latin	US Latin Pop	US Christ
Christine D'Clario	Released: 2005; Label: GB Productions	—	—	—
Solo tú... lo único que quiero	Released: June 7, 2008; Label: Integrity	—	—	—
De Vuelta al Jardín	Released: April 12, 2011; Label: Integrity	—	—	—
Más Profundo	Released: February 19, 2013; Label: Integrity	48	17	—
Eterno	Released: September 10, 2015; Label: Integrity	5	2	30
Emanuel	Released: September 7, 2018; Label: GraceHouse	—	17	—
Hasta Poder Ver	Released: October 8, 2021; Label: GraceHouse	—	—	—
La Novia	Released: August 23, 2024; Label: GraceHouse	—	—	—

==== English ====
List of albums, with selected chart positions
Title	Album details
Deeper	Released: February 19, 2013; Label: Integrity
All That Remains	Released: October 8, 2021; Label: GraceHouse

- Studio albums
- Live albums
