= Paulina Aguirre (musician) =

- Origin: Ecuador
- Genres: Pop, Christian, Latin, electronic
- Occupations: Singer-songwriter, music executive
- Instruments: Piano, guitar
- Years active: 1995–present
- Labels: Mucho Fruto Music, Vene Music
- Website: paulinaaguirre.com

Paulina Aguirre is an Ecuadorian singer-songwriter.

In 2007 Aguirre released her first solo album, Mujer de Fe (Woman of Faith), produced by her husband, Pablo Aguirre. The album features duets with Latin rap artist Gerardo on "Nada Va a Separarme", as well as Juan Carlos Rodriguez (of Tercer Cielo) on "Eres Mi Refugio". The song she alleges, was part of Vive, Lo Mejor de La, Música Cristiana, a compilation album under Mucho Fruto Music and distributed by Fonovisa /Universal Music Latin Entertainment. Mujer de Fe also received the 2007 Latin Grammy nomination for Best Christian Album.

== Career ==
In 2009 Aguirre released her second recording project, Esperando Tu Voz (Waiting for Your Voice), produced by hee husband, Pablo Aguirre. The album features a duet with Armando Manzanero won the 2009 Premio Arpa for Best Duet for "Cuando me Vaya de Aqui".

In 2012 Aguirre released her solo album Rompe el Silencio. "Mariachi Divas" was nominated in 2014 for the Latin Grammy for Best Regional Song.

As a songwriter, Paulina has worked with Mario Domm from the group Camila, Mariachi Divas. As a singer she has worked with Luis Miguel. Marta Sanchez, Marco Antonio Solis, and has been a music coach. For Spanish television, she has been the voice of a commercial for Desperate House Wives on ABC. She has worked for the Disney Channel and she was the lyricist of Tinga –Tinga y Ave y Tres.

In 2018, she played a juror on the TV show "The World's Best.”

In 2020, she was invited to the Warner Bros. Afterparty for the Cinemoi Oscar's. She was also invited by Chateu de Berne, to their Afterparty at the French Riviera Film Festival which was held at the Beverly Hills Hotel.

Aguirre’s team has told VidaEnElValle.com that she is currently working with Taboo (Black Eyed Peas) but it is not confirmed.

== Awards ==
Latin Grammy Awards:

- 2007: Latin Grammy nominee for Best Christian Album – Mujer de Fe
- 2012: Latin Grammy nominee for Best Christian Album – Rompe el Silencio
- 2022: Latin Grammy nominee for Best Folk Album
