= Annette Moreno =

American singer and songwriter (born 1972)

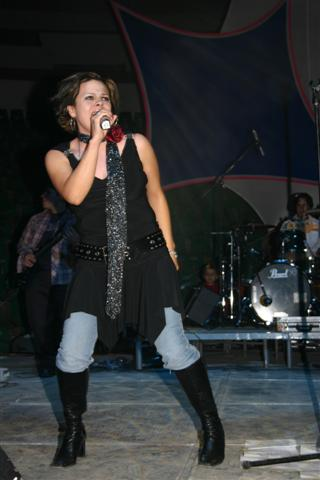
- Moreno in 2008

Background information
- Born: April 26, 1972 (age 53); San Diego, California, U.S.
- Genres: Contemporary Christian music
- Occupations: Singer; songwriter
- Instrument: Vocals
- Years active: 1995–present
- Labels: Independent
- Website: annettemoreno.com

External audio
- You may view songs in Spanish of Annette Moreno here

Annette Moreno (born April 26, 1972) is an American singer and songwriter who performs in the Spanish language. Since her first solo album in 1995 she has released 15 albums, a singles collection and a live DVD. She was previously a member of Rojo and comes from a musical family. Moreno has toured around Latin America and Europe.

== Biography ==
Annette Moreno was born on April 26, 1972, in San Diego, the daughter of Eliezer Moreno, songwriter and singer and a Mexican immigrant. The third in a family of twelve, music was central to her upbringing as her parents performed as Dueto Moreno. In the mid 1970s, they moved to Tucson, Arizona, where her father became a pastor. Like her siblings, she began her singing career at a young age. Moreno began to devote herself to her father's church in her youth. With training and education in music from the age of 12 she began her career in the Mariachi group "Los Salmos" led by her parents, featuring as a violinist and singer for twelve years. Besides supplying vocals, Moreno also began to write lyrics. Her sisters Lilian, Karina, Esther Linda and Keila are also recording artists.

Later in 1995, she recorded her first album called Volar Libre. In 2000 she joined the Rojo, playing Christian rock music, which recorded a self-titled album in 2001. It brought a degree of success and in the same year she recorded her second solo album El Amor que me das, which was nominated for a Ritmo Latino award. It was followed by her third solo album Un Ángel Llora released in October 2002. It received international recognition and won her an ARPA Award. At the end of 2003 Moreno released the seasonal album Navidad.

The 2004 album Ruleta Rusa became an international success, while a greatest hits collection Rewind was released towards the end of the year. In early 2005 she released her first live album En Vivo on CD and DVD. A more personal self-titled album was released in 2006. After a break, Moreno returned to live-performance in 2010 with an extensive tour of Europe and Latin America. In 2011 she released the album Barco de papel where the title-track was released as a single. The following year she recorded a duet "Demente" with the band Tercer Cielo.

In 2013 she published Los Perros Que Ladran, a book outlining her religious inspiration.

In 2009 she married the drummer in her band, Donnie Serrano, and lives in Arizona with their four sons.

== Discography ==
=== Studio albums ===
Year	Title	Album details	Tracklist
1995	Volar Libre	Released: January 27, 1995; Format: CD, digital download; Label: Jardín Records, Music Box Group, LLC & Annette Moreno, LLC	See tracklist: 1. Segura Estoy; 2. Volar Libre; 3. No Me Dejarás; 4. Llegó El Amor A Mí; 5. Toda Mi Vida (with Eli Moreno); 6. No Te Quites La Vida; 7. Búscale; 8. Cicatrices; 9. No Tiene Caso; 10. I'll Be There For You
2001	El Amor Que Me Das	Released: May 24, 2001; Format: CD, digital download; Label: Jardín Records, Music Box Group, LLC & Annette Moreno, LLC	See tracklist: 1. Háblame; 2. Cerca De Ti; 3. El Amor Que Me Das; 4. Hacia La Cruz; 5. Perdón; 6. Cristo En Tu Vida; 7. Los Hombres Sí Lloran; 8. Quiébrame El Corazón; 9. Veo Tu Sonrisa; 10. Me Diste Una Razón; 11. Yo Te Quiero
2002	Un Ángel Llora	Released: Oct 14, 2002; Format: CD, digital download; Label: Jardín Records, Music Box Group, LLC & Annette Moreno, LLC	See tracklist: 1. Complicado; 2. Tu Fortuna; 3. Qué Chévere El Amor; 4. Guardián De Mi Corazón; 5. Bájate De La Canoa; 6. Así Es La Vida; 7. Un Ángel Llora; 8. Sonrisa Al Revés; 9. No Le Digas; 10. Vida Lunática; 11. Amor, Amor, Amor; 12. Tú; 13. Volar Libre (Bonus Track)
2002	Navidad	Released: Nov 6, 2002; Format: CD, digital download; Label: Jardín Records, Music Box Group, LLC & Annette Moreno, LLC	See tracklist: 1. Navidad De Rock; 2. Príncipe De Paz; 3. Noche De Paz; 4. Tiempo De Dar; 5. Invierno En El Desierto; 6. El Tamborilero; 7. Navidad De Cristal (with Eli Moreno); 8. Qué Bonito Niño; 9. Linda Navidad; 10. Winter In The Desert; 11. Silent Night; 12. Drummer Boy
2004	Ruleta Rusa	Released: Feb 15, 2004; Format: CD, digital download; Label: Jardín Records, Music Box Group, LLC & Annette Moreno, LLC	See tracklist: 1. Fanático; 2. Corazón De Piedra; 3. Rompecabezas; 4. Ruleta Rusa; 5. Me Amas; 6. Eres Lindo; 7. Mi Pasión (with Eli Moreno); 8. Qué Viste En Mí; 9. Tus Rosas; 10. Jardín De Rosas; 11. Miserable De Mí; 12. Te He Lastimado
2006	Annette Moreno	Released: May 15, 2006; Format: CD, digital download; Label: Jardín Records, Music Box Group, LLC & Annette Moreno, LLC	See tracklist: 1. Animal; 2. Prende La Luz; 3. No Es Difícil; 4. Corazón Lunático; 5. Ayúdame A Vivir; 6. No Puedo Vivir Sin Ti; 7. Ángel Guardián; 8. Si No Estás; 9. Quiero Que Me Quieras; 10. Brillas; 11. Voy A Llegar A Ti (with Lali Torres and Karina Moreno); 12. Mentira (Studio Version)
2008	Revolucionar	Released: May 1, 2008; Format: CD, digital download; Label: The Chocolate Box Group, LLC, Music Box Group, LLC & Annette Moreno, LLC	See tracklist: 1. Ahora Quiero; 2. Revolucionar; 3. Quién Soy Yo; 4. Chocolate; 5. No Me Importa (with Redimi2); 6. El Tiempo Pasa; 7. Cómo Me Quieres (with Rojo); 8. No Quiero Regresar; 9. Te Voy A Defender; 10. Cómo Olvidarme De Ti; 11. Es Un Sueño
2011	Barco De Papel	Released: Jul 15, 2011; Format: CD, digital download; Label: Music Box Group, LLC & Annette Moreno, LLC	See tracklist: 1. Realizada 2.0; 2. Príncipe Azul; 3. Barco De Papel; 4. Aquí Están Las Llaves; 5. Lo Que Soy; 6. El Vaquero; 7. Soledad; 8. Angelical; 9. Me Aferro; 10. Sigo; 11. Porque Tú Estás
2015	Extraño Mi Futuro	Released: Aug 1, 2015; Format: CD, digital download; Label: Music Box Group, LLC & Annette Moreno, LLC	See tracklist: 1. Agridulce; 2. Debajo Del Agua; 3. La Ranchera; 4. Extraño Mi Futuro; 5. Marioneta (with Apóstoles Del Rap); 6. Mi Carro Viejo; 7. Son Tus Alas; 8. Bittersweet; 9. Marioneta (Mariachi Version); 10. Debajo Del Agua (Radio Version)
2018	Ansiedad	Released: Feb 23, 2018; Format: CD, digital download; Label: Annette Moreno, LLC	See tracklist: 1. Tú Eres (with Kariana Moreno and Eli Moreno); 2. Loca Por Ti; 3. Te Amé; 4. Vas A Volver; 5. Casi, Casi; 6. Ansiedad; 7. Adiós; 8. Lloras Como Un Nene (with Ulises Eyherabide of Rescate); 9. Tempestad; 10. Muñeca, Muñeca; 11. Placer Superior
2022	1972	Released: Feb 4, 2022; Format: Streaming, digital download; Label: Annette Moreno, LLC	See tracklist: 1. 1972; 2. Piel; 3. Gris; 4. Avioneta (with Ana Victoria); 5. Vicio; 6. Dímelo; 7. Fantasía; 8. Desastres; 9. Bailarin
2024	La Reina	Released: Nov 1, 2024; Format: Streaming, digital download; Label: Annette Moreno, LLC	See tracklist: 1. Cobarde, Valiente; 2. Más Fuerte; 3. Mi Papá Me Dijo; 4. Me Vale; 5. Happy Birthday (Feliz Cumpleaños); 6. La Reina; 7. Cobarde, Valiente (Alexio's Version); 8. Calma

=== Extended plays ===
Year	Title	Album details	Tracklist
2016	Belleza	Released: Dec 15, 2016; Format: Digital download; Label: Music Box Group, LLC & Annette Moreno, LLC	See tracklist: 1. So Beautiful; 2. Belleza

=== Compilation albums ===
Year	Title	Album details	Tracklist
2004	Rewind... Lo Esencial De Annette Moreno	Released: 2004; Label: Jardín Records, Music Box Group, LLC & Annette Moreno, LLC; Formats: CD, digital download	See tracklist: 1. Bájate De La Canoa; 2. Jardín De Rosas; 3. Volar Libre; 4. Complicado; 5. Cicatrices; 6. Me Diste Una Razón; 7. Un Ángel Llora; 8. Háblame; 9. Llegó El Amor A Mí; 10. Segura Estoy; 11. No Te Quites La Vida; 12. El Amor Que Me Das
2011	Remixes	Released: May 2, 2011; Label: Jardín Records, Music Box Group, LLC & Annette Moreno, LLC; Formats: CD, digital download	See tracklist: 1. Un Ángel Llora (Remix); 2. Corazón De Piedra (Remix); 3. Me Amas (Remix); 4. Guardián De Mi Corazón (Remix); 5. No Es Difícil (Remix); 6. Corazón Lunático (Remix); 7. Jardín De Rosas (Remix); 8. Amor, Amor, Amor (Remix); 9. Sonrisa Al Revés (Remix); 10. Me Diste Una Razón (Remix)

=== Live / special edition albums ===
Year	Title	Album details	Tracklist
2005	En Vivo	Released: October 18, 2005; Format: Digital download, CD & DVD; Label: Jardín Records, Music Box Group, LLC & Annette Moreno, LLC	See tracklist: 1. Jardín De Rosas (En Vivo); 2. Complicado (En Vivo); 3. Corazón De Piedra (En Vivo); 4. Qué Chévere El Amor (En Vivo); 5. Guardián De Mi Corazón (En Vivo); 6. Volar Libre (En Vivo); 7. Me Amas (En Vivo); 8. Mentira (En Vivo); 9. Bájate De La Canoa (En Vivo); 10. Qué Viste En Mí (En Vivo); 11. El Amor Que Me Das (En Vivo); 12. Amor, Amor, Amor (En Vivo)
2019	Metropolitan Live	Released: October 1, 2019; Format: Digital download & DVD; Label: Annette Moreno, LLC	See tracklist: 1. Ahora Quiero (En Vivo); 2. Te Amé (En Vivo); 3. Extraño Mi Futuro (En Vivo); 4. Vas A Volver (En Vivo); 5. No Le Digas (En Vivo); 6. Carro Viejo (En Vivo); 7. Ángel Guardián (En Vivo); 8. Aquí Están Las Llaves (En Vivo); 9. Casi, Casi (En Vivo); 10. Tú Eres (with Kariana Moreno and Marto) (En Vivo); 11. Tu Fortuna (En Vivo); 12. No Quiero Regresar (En Vivo); 13. Me Diste Una Razón (En Vivo); 14. Un Ángel Llora (En Vivo); 15. Barco De Papel (En Vivo); 16. Ruleta Rusa (En Vivo)

=== As featured artist ===
List of singles, with year, released and album name shown
Year	Title	Album
1996	«Qué Más Puedo Querer» (Karina Moreno featuring Annette Moreno)	No me Olvides
1999	«Fuiste Tú» (Lilian Moreno featuring Annette Moreno)	Lilian Moreno
2001	«Lo que soy»	Orbita-X (Various Artists)
2001	«Las cosas viejas»	Orbita-X (Various Artists)
2004	«California Dreaming»	A Day Without A Mexican (Various Artists)
2004	«Tu Amor Me Inspira»	Proyecto Discípulo (Various Artists)
2005	«Niña» (Zona7 featuring Annette Moreno)	No me critiques
2005	«Fuiste Tú» (Lilian Moreno featuring Annette Moreno)	Lilian Moreno
2005	«Uv Sha'avtem Maim (ושאבתם מים)»	Israel 3 (Various Artists)
2007	«Ya Lo Vi» (Puerto Seguro featuring Annette Moreno)	Más de cerca
2007	«Siempre Estás» (Kariana Moreno featuring Annette Moreno)	Kariana Moreno
2007	«Contigo Quiero Estar» (Stanley Serrano featuring Annette Moreno)	La razón
2009	«Te Amo Señor»	Maranatha Music - Quiero Alabarte 7 (Various Artists)
2009	«Realidad» (Kandela featuring Annette Moreno)	El precio del perdón
2010	«Sangrando Amor» (Eclipse featuring Annette Moreno)	Electroshock! Dulce Impulso Al Éxtasis
2011	«Amor De Verdad» (Ramiro Garza featuring Annette Moreno)	Fuego latino
2011	«Intro: Exterminador» (Redimi2 featuring Annette Moreno)	Exterminador Operación P.R.
2012	«Demente» (Tercer Cielo featuring Annette Moreno)	Lo que el viento me enseñó
2012	«Demente (Mariachi Version)» (ercer Cielo featuring Annette Moreno)	Lo que el viento me enseñó
2013	«Su Mirada» (Redimi2 + Funky featuring Annette Moreno)	Más
2013	«Ellos Tendrán» (Mayte Castellá featuring Annette Moreno)	Non-album single
2015	«No Es Difícil» (Joseph Cabanilla featuring Annette Moreno)	Joseph Cabanilla 10 Años Primera Fila
2016	«Lo Que Perdiste» (Karina Moreno featuring Annette Moreno)	Ella
2017	«Ya Lo Vi» (Lilian Moreno featuring Annette Moreno)	Lilian Moreno
2022	«Ayer» (Josh Jauregui featuring Annette Moreno)	Non-album single

== Awards and nominations ==
=== Arpa Awards ===
Year	Category	Nominated	Result
2001	Rock album	Rojo group	Winner
2001	Female vocal album	Rojo group	Winner

=== Diosa de Plata Awards ===
Year	Category	Nominated	Result
2005	Best theme music	Anette Moreno in Cicatrices	Winner

=== Latin Grammy ===
Year	Category	Nominated	Result
2003	Best Christian Album	Un Ángel Llora	Nominated
