= Danilo Montero =

Costa Rican singer (born 1962)

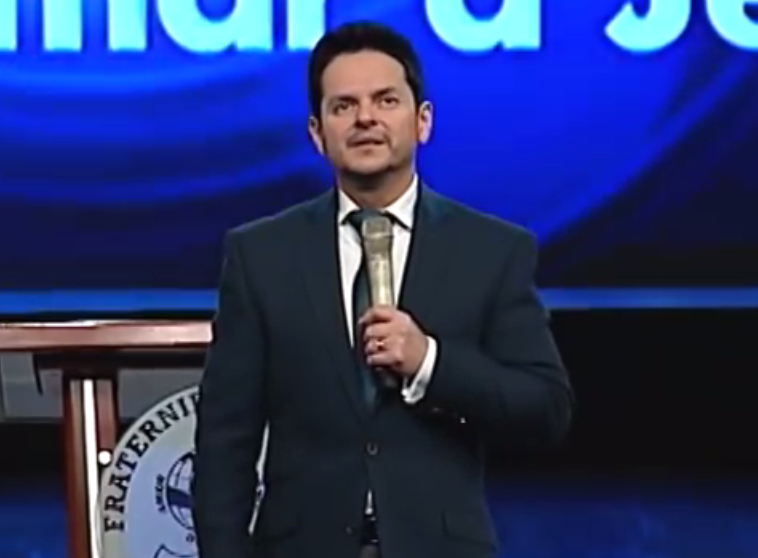

Background information
- Born: 1 November 1962 (age 63); San José, Costa Rica
- Genres: Contemporary Christian music
- Occupations: Musician, author, pastor
- Instrument: Vocals
- Years active: 1983–present
- Labels: Independent
- Website: sigueme.org

Luis Danilo Montero (born 1 November 1962) is a Costa Rican contemporary Christian music singer, author, and pastor, who is pastor of Lakewood Church's Spanish-speaking congregation.

== Biography ==
Born on 1 November 1962, in San Jose, Costa Rica, he formed "Sígueme Internacional" in 1983 and began leading worship around the same time. A ministry as well as a musical production company, Sígueme organizes worship retreats internationally. He has recorded about 18 albums throughout his ministerial career that are part of the songs that are sung today in many Hispanic-speaking Protestant churches. He married Gloriana Diaz in April 2006. He converted to Christianity at the age of 14 when he was invited to the Great Campaign of Divine Healing annual meeting.

Montero has replaced Marcos Witt as the pastor for the Spanish-speaking ministry of Joel Osteen's Lakewood Church- Houston, Texas. He has written several Christian books such as "El Abrazo del Padre" and "Generación de Adoradores." He married Gloriana Diaz on 22 April 2006 in San José, Costa Rica, to a large number of witnesses and being present to Rev. Rey Matos, Raul Vargas, and Ricardo Salazar, pastor of the church "Vida Abundante". He led a ministry that won the 2008 Billboard Award for Latin music's best Christian music album with the song "Your Love."

He and his wife reside in Houston, Texas.

== Discography ==
=== With Grupo Sígueme ===
- Mi Adoración (1986)
- Tú Eres Digno (1987)
- Cara A Cara (1991)
- Las Naciones Cantarán (1992)

=== Solo ===
- Celebra al Señor (1995)
- Admirable (1997)
- No Más Barreras (with Jaime Murrell) (1998)
- Eres Todopoderoso (1999)
- Cantaré De Tu Amor (2001)
- Sígueme (2003)
- Lo Mejor De Danilo Montero (2003)
- Fortaleza (2004)
- Danilo En Vivo (desde Lima, Perú) (2005)
- Fortaleza (En Vivo) (2005)
- Eres Tú (2006)
- Tu Amor (2008)
- Devoción (2009)
- La Carta Perfecta (En Vivo) (2013)
- Mi Viaje (2018)
- Mi Viaje (En Vivo) (2019)
- Encuentros (2020)
- Navidad (2024)
