= Daniel Calveti =

Venezuelan Christian music singer (born 1977)

- Born: November 29, 1977 (age 47); Caracas, Venezuela
- Origin: Caguas, Puerto Rico
- Genres: Contemporary Christian music
- Occupation: Singer
- Instrument(s): Vocals; Guitar
- Years active: 1994-present
- Labels: CanZion; Universal Latino
- Spinoffs: Gateway Worship
- Website: danielcalveti.com

Daniel Calveti (born November 29, 1977) is a Venezuelan Christian music singer. He was born in Caracas and eventually moved his family to Caguas, Puerto Rico. Calveti has seven productions of Christian music and two books. On three occasions it has been nominated for the Latin Grammy Awards as Best Christian Album in 2006, 2007, 2013 and 2018. He has won five AMCL prizes and three arpa awards.

His album "En Paz", managed to position itself on Billboard charts, debuting at position 9 on the Latin Pop Albums chart.

== Biography ==
Daniel Calveti is a contemporary Christian music (CCM) artist from Puerto Rico who is among the most popular Latin singers in the genre. Born in Caracas, Venezuela, on November 29, 1977, he moved with his family to Houston at age 12. He later moved to Puerto Rico at age 17 and attended a Christian college. In addition to his deep involvement in ministry, Calveti established himself as a music artist, not only as a live performer but also as a recording artist.

He made his recording debut with Solo Tu Gracia in 2004. His second album, Vivo Para Ti, was a success, garnering nominations in 2006 for a Latin Grammy in the category of Christian Latin Album of the Year and Arpa Awards in the category of Composer of the Year. His third album, Un Día Más, was also nominated for a Latin Grammy and Arpa Awards, along with a Dove Award in 2007. En Paz, his fourth album, his growing success continued. Released by Universal Latino, their first major label release after years of association with independent label CanZion, En Paz was Calveti's most successful commercial release to date; the title track was his first hit single to chart on the Billboard Latin Pop Airplay chart.

In 2012, Calveti presented his album Mi Refugio, which included the collaborations of the singers Christine D’Clario and Funky on the song «Cada día», as well as David Scarpeta, Giosué Calveti, Jacobo Ramos and Emmanuel Espinosa on the song "Integridad". This album was recognized as Best Songwriter Album at the Arpa Awards.

== Discography ==
=== Studio albums ===
- 2003: Solo tu gracia
- 2005: Vivo para Ti
- 2006: Un día más
- 2008: En paz
- 2009: Mi mundo necesita de Ti
- 2012: Mi refugio
- 2017: Habla Sobre Mí
- 2023: La Mesa

== Awards and nominations ==
=== Latin Grammy Awards ===
Nomination as Best Christian Album in 2006, 2007, 2013 and 2018.

=== AMCL awards ===
- 2005: Solo tu gracia - Revelation of the year song
- 2007: La niña de tus ojos - Song of the people of the year
- 2007: Un día más - Traditional or popular album of the year
- 2011: Una muestra de amor - Tour of the year
- 2012: Mi refugio - Album of the singer of the year

=== Arpa Awards ===
- 2009: En paz - Composer of the year
- 2009: En paz - Best album of the year
- 2013: Mi refugio - Best album of the year
