= Jaime Murrell =

Panamanian musician (1949–2021)

Jaime Murrell (31 October 1949 – 4 February 2021) was a Panamanian Christian music composer.

== Career ==
Murrell was born in Panama City, and was a secular music national talent in the 1970s. He sang leads for a group by the name of "The Mozambiques" in Panama City.

He died from COVID-19 in Miami at age 71 during the COVID-19 pandemic in Florida.

== Discography ==
- Grandes Son Tus Maravillas (with Marcos Witt) (1993)
- Cristo Reina (1994)
- Eres Señor (1996)
- Te pido la Paz (1994)
- Déjame que te alabe (1997)
- Quiero alabar (1998)
- Prometo Amarte (2000)
- 25 años de ministerio (2003)
- Al que venció (2008)
