= Aline Barros =

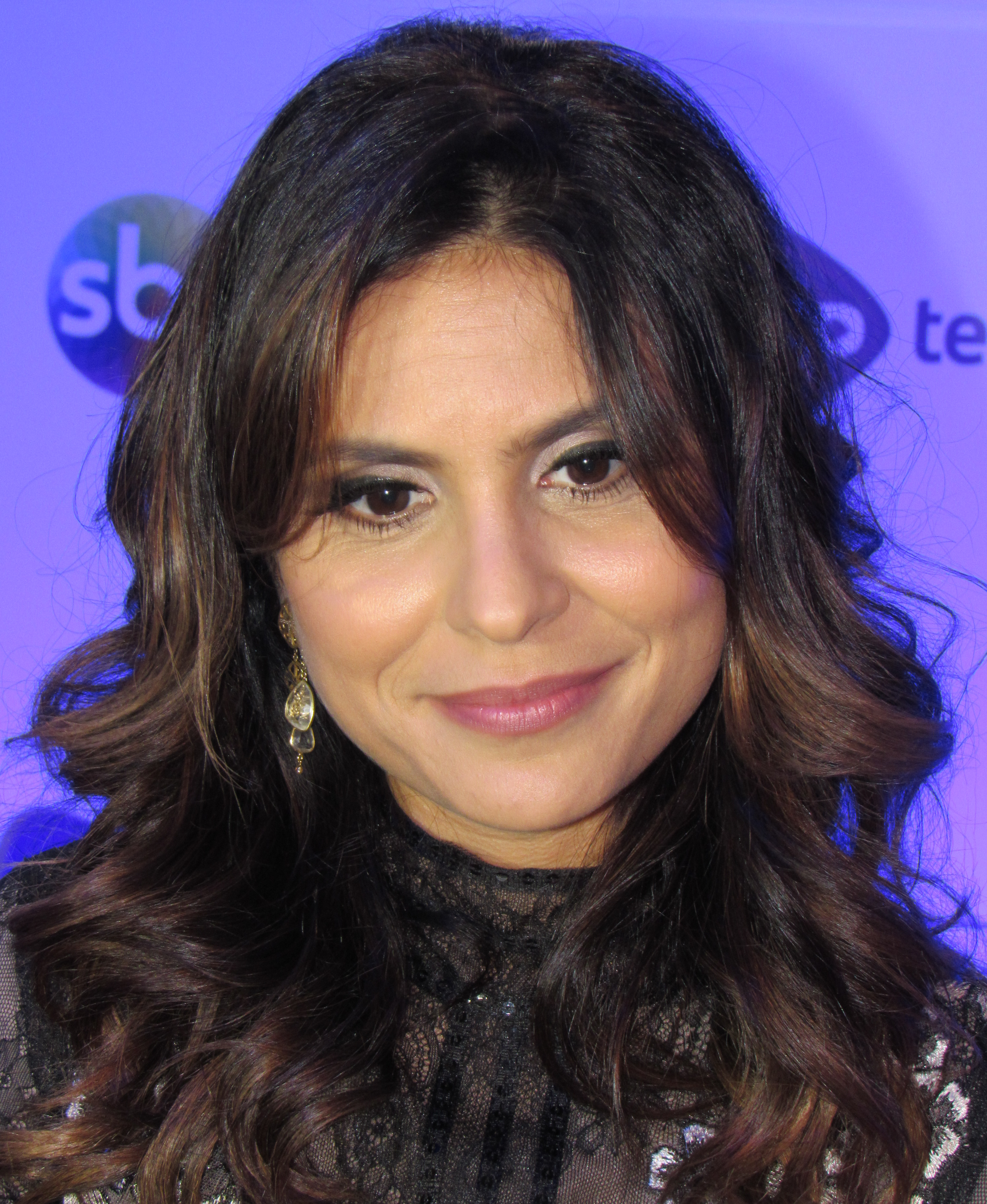
- Barros in 2016

Background information
- Born: Aline Barros Kistenmacker dos Santos; 7 October 1976 (age 49); Rio de Janeiro, RJ, Brazil
- Genres: Contemporary Christian music, Gospel, children's music
- Occupation: Singer
- Instrument: Vocals
- Years active: 1992–present
- Labels: Grape Vine (1995–1996); AB Records (1997–2003); MK Music (2004–2017); Sony Music (2017–present)
- Website: alinebarros.com.br

Aline Barros Kistenmacker dos Santos (born 7 October 1976) is a Brazilian singer and songwriter. Several of her albums have been certified multiple times as Diamond by the Associação Brasileira dos Produtores de Discos (ABPD).

== Partial discography ==
The following discography includes only albums which have been certified by the Associação Brasileira dos Produtores de Discos (ABPD).

=== Unreleased albums ===
Album Title	Album details	Certification	Certified sales
Sem Limites	Released: 1995; Label: Grape Vine; Format: Vinil, K7, CD	2× Platinum	600,000
Voz do Coração	Released: 1998; Label: AB Records; Format: CD	2× Platinum	500,000
O poder do teu Amor	Released: 2000; Label: AB Records; Format: CD	2× Platinum	500,000
Fruto de Amor	Released: 2003; Label: AB Records; Format: CD	2× Platinum	600,000
Som de Adoradores	Released: October 2004; Label: MK Music; Format: CD, DVD	CD: Diamond; DVD: Diamond	CD: 1,200,000; DVD: 300,000
Caminho de Milagres	Released: March 30, 2007; Label: MK Music; Format: CD, DVD	CD: 3× Platinum; DVD: Platinum	CD: 850,000; DVD: 100,000
Extraordinário Amor de Deus	Released: January 23, 2011; Label: MK Music; Format: CD, download digital	2× Diamond	700,000
Graça	Released: November 19, 2013; Label: MK Music; Format: CD, download digital	2× Platinum	200,000
Acenda a Sua Luz	Released: January 23, 2017; Label: MK Music; Format: CD, download digital		30,000
Viva	Released: December 7, 2018; Label: Sony Music; Format: download digital	Only download digital	
Reino	Released: July 9, 2019; Label: Sony Music; Format: download digital	Only download digital	
Minha Oração	Released: January, 2022; Label: Sony Music; Format: download digital	* Gold	Only download digital

=== Children's albums ===
Album Title	Album details	Certification	Certified sales
Bom É Ser Criança	Released: 1999; Label: AB Records; Format: CD	Gold	200,000
Bom É Ser Criança Vol. 2	Released: 2002; Label: AB Records; Format: CD	Platinum	500,000
Aline Barros & Cia	Released: 2005; Label: MK Music; Format: CD, DVD	CD: Gold; DVD: Diamond	CD: 200,000; DVD: 300,000
Aline Barros & Cia 2	Released: April 2008; Label: MK Music; Format: CD, DVD	CD: Platinum; DVD: 3× Platinum	CD: 100,000; DVD: 200,000
Aline Barros & Cia 3	Released: September 2011; Label: MK Music; Format: CD, DVD	CD: Platinum; DVD: 2× Platinum	CD: 100,000; DVD: 150,000
Tim-Tim Por Tim-Tim	Released: November 25, 2014; Label: MK Music; Format: CD, DVD	CD: Gold; DVD: Gold	CD: 60,000; DVD: 30,000
ImaginAline	Released: April 27, 2018; Label: Sony Music; Format: CD, DVD		CD: 4,000; DVD: 6,000

=== Collections ===
Album Title	Album details	Certification	Certified sales
O Melhor da Música Gospel	Released: 2008; Label: Som Livre; Format: CD	Gold	50,000
Consagração	Released: AB Records; Label: 2008; Format: CD	Platinum	100,000
Som Gospel	Released: 2009; Label: MK Music; Format: CD	3× Platinum	300,000
Deus do Impossível	Released: 2009; Label: Som Livre; Format: CD	Platinum	100,000
20 Anos ao vivo	Released: 2013; Label: Sony Music; Format: CD, DVD	CD: Gold; DVD: Gold	CD: 40,000; DVD: 25,000

== Books ==
- 2001 – Reflexões de Paz
- 2003 – Muito mais que um Sonho
- 2009 – O Poder da esposa que Ora (Audiobook)
- 2009 – Álbum do Bebê
- 2010 – Fé e Paixão
- 2011 – Bíblia: Minhas Histórias Favoritas (Infantil)
- 2015 – Graça Extraordinária

== Awards nominations ==
DMX Awards

Year	Category	Result
2015	Top Digital Engagement	Won

Dove Awards

Year	Category	Recipient	Result
2008	Best Spanish Language Album	Refréscate	Won
2009	Personality of the Year	Herself	Honored

Latin Grammy Awards

Year	Category	Recipient	Result
2004	Best Portuguese Language Christian Music Album	Fruto de Amor	Won
2005	Best Portuguese Language Christian Music Album	Som de Adoradores	Nominated
2005	Best Spanish-Language Christian Music Album	Aline	Nominated
2006	Best Portuguese Language Christian Music Album	Aline Barros & Cia	Won
2007	Best Portuguese Language Christian Music Album	Caminho de Milagres	Won
2008	Best Portuguese Language Christian Music Album	Aline Barros & Cia 2	Nominated
2008	Best Spanish-Language Christian Music Album	Refréscate	Nominated
2011	Best Portuguese Language Christian Music Album	Extraordinário Amor de Deus	Won
2012	Best Portuguese Language Christian Music Album	Aline Barros & Cia 3	Won
2014	Best Portuguese Language Christian Music Album	Graça	Won
2017	Best Portuguese Language Christian Music Album	Acenda a Sua Luz	Won
2020	Best Portuguese Language Christian Music Album	Reino	Won
2021	Best Spanish-Language Christian Music Album	Redención	Nominated
2023	Best Portuguese Language Christian Music Album	30 Anos Volume 1	Nominated

Prêmio Arpa

Year	Category	Recipient	Result
2005	Best Children's Album	Fiesta en el Jardín	Nominated

Troféu FM 105 da Música Evangélica

Year	Category	Recipient	Result
1995	Best New Singer	Herself	Won

Troféu Talento

Year	Category	Recipient	Result
1996	Feminine Revelation	Herself	Nominated
1998	Singer of the Year	Herself	Won
2002	Children's CD	Bom é Ser Criança Vol. 2	Won
2004	Best Pop CD	Fruto de Amor	Won
2005	Outstanding Singer of the Year 2004	Herself	Won
2006	Children's CD	Aline Barros & Cia	Won
2006	Collection Album	10 Anos de Louvor e Adoração	Won
2007	Featured Singer of the Year 2006	Herself	Won
2008	Live Album	Caminho de Milagres	Won
2008	Singer of the Year	Herself	Won
2009	Performer of the year	Herself	Won

Troféu Promessas

Year	Category	Recipient	Result
2011	Best music	Ressuscita-me	Nominated
2011	Best DVD	Aline Barros na Estrada	Nominated
2011	Best Clip	Ressuscita-me	Nominated
2011	Best CD	Extraordinário Amor de Deus	Nominated
2011	Best singer	Herself	Won
2012	Best DVD/Blu-ray	Aline Barros & Cia 3	Nominated
2012	Best singer	Herself	Nominated

Troféu Imprensa

Year	Category	Recipient	Result
1995	Best Evangelical Music	Consagração	Won
1995	Revelation Evangelical Singer	Herself	Nominated
1998	Best Evangelical Music	Corra para os braços do Pai	Nominated
2014	Best singer	Herself	Nominated

Prêmio de Música Digital

Year	Category	Recipient	Result
2010	Sale Category	Sonda-me, Usa-me	Nominated

Troféu Gerando Salvação

Year	Category	Recipient	Result
2019	Children's project	Não divulgado	Won
2022	Videoclipe	Jeová Jireh	Nominated

Prêmio IBest

Year	Category	Recipient	Result
2023	Gospel	Academia IBest	Nominated
