= Marco Barrientos =

Mexican singer (born 1963)

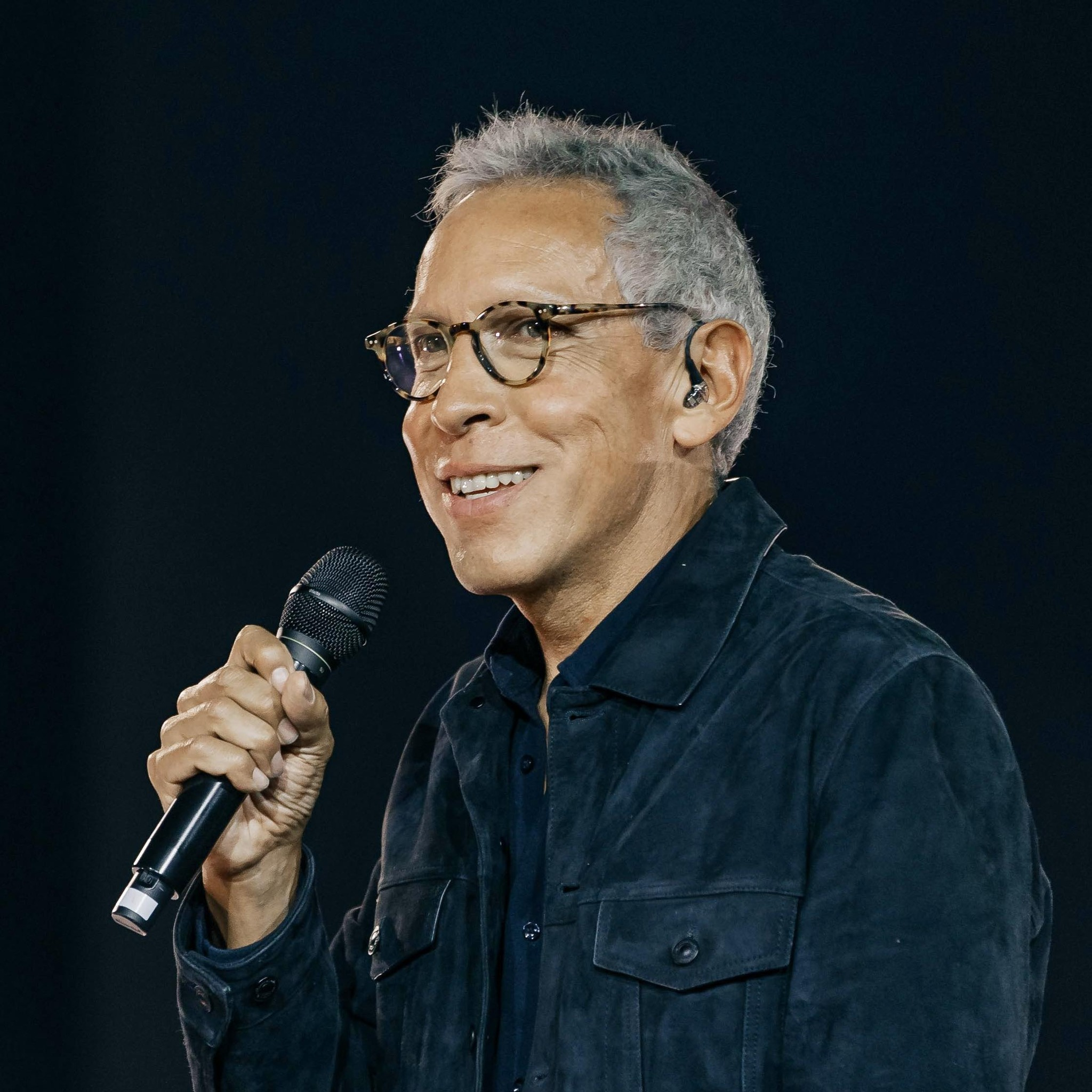

Background information
- Born: 28 June 1963 (age 63); Mexico City, Mexico
- Genre: Contemporary Christian music
- Occupations: Musician, author, pastor, speaker, teacher
- Instrument: Vocals
- Years active: 1985–present
- Label: Aliento Music Group http://www.aliento.com
- Website: http://marcobarrientos.com/

Marco Antonio Barrientos Zumpano (born June 28, 1963), better known as simply Marco Barrientos, is a Mexican evangelical Christian musician, pastor, author, teacher, and speaker known for combining practical biblical principles with the flow of prophetic songs.

Barrientos has an extensive discography, and is best known for his productions "Sin Reservas", "Es Hora de Adorarle", "Transformados", and "Ilumina". He has been nominated for the Arpa Awards in many times and Latin Grammy Awards three times, for Best Christian Album for his productions "Viento + Fuego" in 2005, "Transformados" in 2011, and "Amanece" in 2015.

== Early life and education ==
Barrientos was born in Mexico. He graduated from Christ for the Nations Bible Institute in 1985.

== Ministry ==
Since his graduation, he has been in full-time ministry, beginning as associate pastor of "Amistad Cristiana" in Mexico City. He remained there for 13 years, and then he founded the ministry "Amistad Cristiana Internacional" and the music label "Aliento Producciones", in which he is president.

Barrientos has 30 recordings of praise and worship.

He is also the director and host of "Avívanos", (Revive us) an annual worship conference part of Amistad Cristiana Internacional, Inc.

== Discography ==
Albums:

- 1986 Este Es El Día de Alabanza
- 1988 Sé Exaltado
- 1988 Por Siempre, Señor
- 1990 Príncipe de Paz
- 1991 A La Batalla
- 1991 En Tí
- 1992 Delante De Tu Trono
- 1992 Un Día En Tu Presencia
- 1993 No Puedo Parar De Alabarte
- 1994 Tú Eres Señor
- 1995 Clamor De Guerra
- 1995 Poderoso Dios
- 1995 Espíritu Santo y Fuego
- 1996 Río Poderoso
- 1997 Aliento Del Cielo
- 1997 Mas De Ti
- 1997 No Hay Nadie Como Tu
- 1998 Una Vida De Alabanza
- 1999 Luz A Las Naciones
- 1999 Sin Reservas
- 2000 Un Día En Tu Presencia
- 2000 Es Hora De Adorarle
- 2001 Clamemos A Jesús
- 2002 Yo Soy Amor
- 2002 Venga Tu Reino
- 2003 Es Por Tu Gracia
- 2003 Yo Soy Tu Sanador
- 2003 Muéstrame Tu Gloria
- 2004 Yo Soy Tu Paz
- 2004 Viento + Fuego
- 2005 Yo Soy Tu Padre
- 2005 Gozo En Tu Presencia
- 2006 Joy in Your Presence
- 2006 Yo Soy Tu Consolador
- 2006 Levántate y Resplandece
- 2007 Yo Soy Tu Luz
- 2007 Cree, Todo Es Posible
- 2008 Yo Soy Tu Libertador
- 2008 Avívanos
- 2009 Descansa En Mi
- 2009 Yo Soy Tu Esperanza
- 2009 Momentos En Tu Presencia
- 2009 En Vivo Desde El Auditorio Nacional
- 2010 Intimo
- 2010 Transformados
- 2011 Momentos Espontáneos
- 2012 Ilumina
- 2012 Global Project (Español)
- 2014 Amanece
- 2016 El Encuentro
- 2016 Legado de Adoración
- 2017 Encuentros con Dios
- 2020 Amor Inagotable
- 2024 Devocionales
- 2025 ALIENTO

Singles & EPs:

- 2012 Ilumina - Single
- 2015 Rey Infinito (En Vivo)
- 2016 Eres Mi Salvador
- 2019 El Poder de Tu Sangre
- 2024 Yo Sé
- 2024 Para Siempre te Bendeciré

== Bibliography ==
- 2000 El plan de Dios para ti
- 2004 Muéstrame tu gloria
- 2005 Viento más fuego
- 2008 ¡Cree, todo es posible!
