= Danny Gokey discography =

American singer

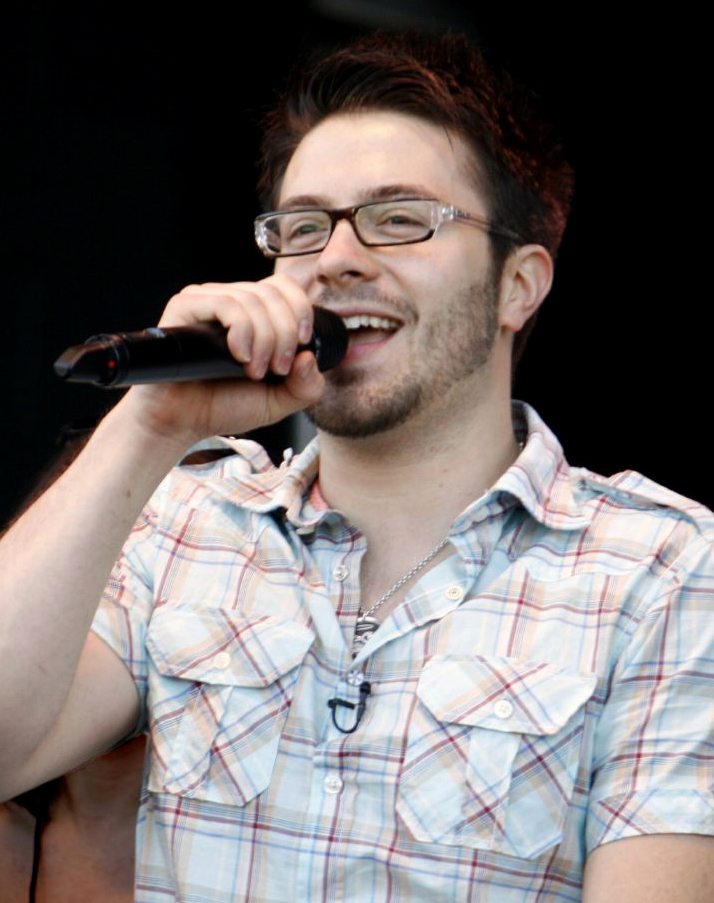
- Studio albums: 8
- EPs: 1
- Singles: 27
- Music videos: 22

American singer Danny Gokey has released seven studio albums, one extended play, and 27 singles. After finishing third place on the eighth season of the singing competition American Idol, Gokey released his debut album My Best Days in 2010. The album charted two singles on the Billboard Hot Country Songs charts. After a third single included only on an extended play, Gokey began recording contemporary Christian music, where he has had more commercial and chart success.

== Albums ==
Title	Album details	Peak chart positions							Sales
Title	Album details	US	US Christ.	US Country	US Indie	US Latin	US Hol	UK Country	Sales
My Best Days	Release date: March 2, 2010; Label: RCA Nashville/19; Format: CD, digital download	4	—	3	—	—	—	16	US: 204,000
Hope in Front of Me	Release date: June 23, 2014; Label: BMG; Format: CD, digital download	40	1	—	10	—	—	—	
Christmas Is Here	Release date: October 16, 2015; Label: BMG; Format: CD, digital download	— (Note: Christmas is Here did not chart on the Billboard 200, but peaked at No. 1 on the Top Holiday Albums chart.)	9	—	—	—	—	—	
La Esperanza Frente a Mi	Release date: July 29, 2016; Label: BMG; Format: CD, digital download	—	—	—	—	27	—	—	
Rise	Release date: January 13, 2017; Label: BMG; Format: CD, digital download	32	1	—	3	—	—	—	US: 11,000
Haven't Seen It Yet	Release date: April 12, 2019; Label: Sparrow; Format: CD, digital download	76	2	—	—	—	—	—	
The Greatest Gift: A Christmas Collection	Release date: October 25, 2019; Label: Sparrow; Format: CD, digital download	— (Note: The Greatest Gift: A Christmas Collection did not chart on the Billboard 200, but peaked at No. 99 on the Top Album Sales chart.)	32	—	—	—	11	—	
Jesus People	Release date: August 20, 2021; Label: Sparrow; Format: CD, digital download, streaming	99	1	—	—	—	—	—	US: 9,000
Sound of Heaven	Release date: July 26, 2024; Label: Sparrow; Format: CD, digital download, streaming	— (Note: Sound of Heaven did not enter the Billboard 200, but peaked at No. 50 on the Billboard Top Current Album Sales)	8	—	—	—	—	—	
"—" denotes a recording that did not chart or were not released in that territory.

== Extended plays ==
Title	EP details
Love Again	Release date: May 2012; Label: Self-released; Format: CD; Track listing: 1. Gimme a Kiss; 2. Love Again; 3. Everything Works Together (feat. Beckah Shae); 4. Second Hand Heart; 5. Faith, Hope & Love; 6. I Still Believe (feat. Sophia's Heart Choir); 7. Gimme a Kiss (Remix)

== Singles ==
Title	Year	Peak chart positions						Certifications	Album
Title	Year	US	US Christ.	US Christ. Airplay	US Christ. AC	US Country	US AC	Certifications	Album
"My Best Days Are Ahead of Me"	2009	82	—	—	—	24	—		My Best Days
"I Will Not Say Goodbye"	2010	—	—	—	—	32	—		My Best Days
"Second Hand Heart"	2011	—	—	—	—	48	—		Love Again
"Hope in Front of Me"	2014	—	4	1	1	—	27		Hope in Front of Me
"More Than You Think I Am"	2015	—	17	6	8	—	—		Hope in Front of Me
"Lift Up Your Eyes"	2015	—	17	13	4	—	—		Christmas Is Here
"Tell Your Heart to Beat Again"	2016	—	2	1	2	—	—	RIAA: Gold	Hope in Front of Me
"Rise"	2016	—	5	1	1	—	—		Rise
"The Comeback"	2017	—	11	6	10	—	—		Rise
"Masterpiece"	2018	—	20	15	27	—	—		Rise
"If You Ain't in It"	2018	—	26	19	23	—	—		Rise
"The Prayer" (with Natalie Grant)	2018	—	20	14	11	—	—		The Greatest Gift: A Christmas Collection
"Joy to the World"	2019	—	47	14	8	—	—		The Greatest Gift: A Christmas Collection
"Haven't Seen It Yet"	2019	—	3	1	1	—	—	RIAA: Gold	Haven't Seen It Yet
"Wanted"	2019	—	33	22	25	—	—		Haven't Seen It Yet
"Love God Love People" (with Michael W. Smith)	2020	—	5	2	3	—	—		Haven't Seen It Yet
"Be Alright" (with Evan Craft featuring Redimi2)	2020	— (Note: Be Alright did not chart on the Billboard Hot 100, but peaked at No. 25 on the Bubbling Under Hot 100 chart)	2	3	4	—	—	RIAA: Gold	Non-album singles
"New Day" (Radio Version)	2021	—	—	—	—	—	—		Non-album singles
"New Day"	2021	—	14	11	13	—	—		Haven't Seen It Yet
"Cristo Es Necesario" (with Christine D'Clario)	2021	—	—	—	—	—	—		Jesus People
"We All Need Jesus" (featuring Koryn Hawthorne)	2021	—	35	25	—	—	—		Jesus People
"Stand In Faith"	2021	—	10	6	6	—	—		Jesus People
"He Believes in You"	2021	—	48	—	—	—	—		Jesus People
"Bucket List" (with Mitchell Tenpenny)	2021	—	—	—	—	—	—		Non-album single
"Live Up to Your Name" (Live) / "Er Quien Dices Ser" / "Live Up to Your Name"	2023	—	—	—	—	—	—		Live Up to Your Name (Note: Live Up to Your Name is the name of a three-song single.)
"Montaña (Cortio)" [Live]	2023	—	—	—	—	—	—		Non-album single
"I Got You"	2024	—	15	8	14	—	—		Sound of Heaven
"Sound of Heaven"	2024	—	30	—	—	—	—		Sound of Heaven
"Firme Estaré"	2025	—	—	—	—	—	—		Non-album single
"Only for a Moment"	2025	—	—	—	—	—	—		Sound of Heaven
"Ti Tengo A Ti" (with Sarai Rivera)	2025	—	—	—	—	—	—		Non-album singles
"The Moment the Whole World Changed"	2025	—	—	9	7	—	—		Non-album singles
"—" denotes a recording that did not chart or were not released in that territory.

=== As featured artist ===
List of singles as featured artist, with chart positions
Title	Year	Peak chart positions		Album
Title	Year	US Christ.	US Christ. Digital	Album
2021	"Every Victory" (The Belonging Co featuring Danny Gokey)	29	15	See the Light
2021	"Dios Es Más Grande" (Miel San Marcos with Danny Gokey)	—	—	Non-album singles
2021	"Bucket List" (Mitchell Tenpenny & Danny Gokey)	—	—	Non-album singles

=== Promotional singles ===
Year	Title	Album
2010	"Tennessee Christmas"	Non-album single
2016	"Better Than I Found It"	Rise

=== Other charted songs ===
Title	Year	Peak positions				Album
Title	Year	US Bub.	US Christ.	US Christ. Airplay	US Christ. AC	Album
"You Are So Beautiful"	2009	25	—	—	—	Non-album song
"Mary, Did You Know?"	2015	—	14	8	5	Christmas Is Here
"My America (I Still Believe)"	2023	—	45	39	—	Brave
"Brave"	2023	—	— (Note: "Brave" did not chart on the Hot Christian Songs chart, but peaked at number 8 on the Christian Digital Song Sales chart.)	—	—	Brave
"God Bless the U.S.A."	2023	—	— (Note: "God Bless the U.S.A." did not chart on the Hot Christian Songs chart, but peaked at number 6 on the Christian Digital Song Sales chart.)	47	—	Brave
"—" denotes a recording that did not chart.

=== Music videos ===
Year	Title	Director(s)	Album
2010	"My Best Days Are Ahead of Me"	Wes Edwards	My Best Days
2010	"I Will Not Say Goodbye"	Wes Edwards	My Best Days
2014	"Hope in Front of Me"	—N/a	Hope in Front of Me
2016	"Tell Your Heart to Beat Again"	Kristine Barlowe	Hope in Front of Me
2019	"Haven't Seen It Yet"	—N/a	Haven't Seen It Yet
2019	"Wanted"	—N/a	Haven't Seen It Yet
2019	"The Holidays Are Here"	—N/a	The Greatest Gift: A Christmas Collection
2019	"Noche de Paz" (with David Archuleta)	—N/a	The Greatest Gift: A Christmas Collection
2020	"Ama A Tu Dios Y A Tu Vecino" (with Evan Craft featuring Redimi2)	Daniel Veras; Luis Gómez	—N/a
2020	"No Lo Has Visto Aún" (with Lilly Goodman)	—N/a	—N/a
2021	"New Day"	—N/a	Haven't Seen It Yet
2021	"We All Need Jesus" (with Koryn Hawthorne	—N/a	Jesus People
2021	"Cristo es Necesario"	Christine D'Clario	Jesus People
2021	"He Believes in You"	—N/a	Jesus People
2021	"Agradecido"	—N/a	Jesus People
2021	"Stand in Faith"	—N/a	Jesus People
2021	"Do for Love"	Angie Rose	Jesus People
2021	"Bucket List" (with Mitchell Tenpenny)	—N/a	—N/a
2022	"Agradecido (Español)" (with Alex Zurdo)	Daniel Veras	—N/a
2023	"Stay Strong"	—N/a	Jesus People
2024	"I Got You"	—N/a	—N/a
