= 48th GMA Dove Awards =

2017 US music awards ceremony

- Date: October 17, 2017
- Location: Allen Arena, Nashville, Tennessee
- Hosted by: Kari Jobe and Tasha Cobbs Leonard
- Website: http://www.doveawards.com

Television/radio coverage
- Network: TBN (October 22, 2017)

The 48th Annual GMA Dove Awards presentation ceremony was held on Tuesday, October 17, 2017 at the Allen Arena located in Nashville, Tennessee. The ceremony recognized the accomplishments of musicians and other figures within the Christian music industry for the year 2017. The event was produced by the Trinity Broadcasting Network and hosted by female singers Kari Jobe and Tasha Cobbs Leonard. The awards show was broadcast on the Trinity Broadcasting Network on October 22, 2017.

== Performers ==
The following were some of the musical artists who performed at the 48th GMA Dove Awards:

- Bri
- Danny Gokey
- Gaither Vocal Band
- Ryan Stevenson
- Travis Greene
- CeCe Winans
- Hillsong Worship
- Matt Redman
- MercyMe
- Reba McEntire
- Steven Malcolm
- Zach Williams
- Casting Crowns
- Erica Campbell
- Hezekiah Walker
- Hollyn
- Jekalyn Carr
- Joseph Habedank
- Micah Tyler
- Tauren Wells

== Presenters ==
The following were some of the presenters at the 48th GMA Dove Awards:

- Anthony Brown
- Chris Tomlin
- David and Tamela Mann
- for KING & COUNTRY
- Matt Maher
- Beth Moore
- Dr. Bobby Jones
- Brandon Heath
- Chonda Pierce
- Jaci Velasquez
- John Gray
- Karen Peck Gooch
- Kim Fields
- Lauren Daigle
- Mandisa
- Miel San Marcos
- Gov. Mike Huckabee
- Montell Jordan
- Trace Adkins
- Travis Cottrell
- Tye Tribbett

== Nominees and winners ==
This is a complete list of the nominees for the 48th GMA Dove Awards. The winners are in bold.

=== General ===
Song of the Year

- "Chain Breaker"
  - (writers) Jonathan Smith, Mia Fieldes, Zach Williams (publishers) Anthems of Hope, Be Essential Songs, Not Just Another Song Publishing, So Essential Tunes, Upside Down Under, Wisteria Drive
- "Come Alive (Dry Bones)"
  - (writers) Lauren Daigle, Michael Farren (publishers) Wordspring Music, LLC, CentricSongs, Farren Love And War Publishing
- "Even If"
  - (writers) Bart Millard, Ben Glover, Crystal Lewis, David Garcia, Tim Timmons (publishers) D Soul Music, Universal Music – Brentwood Benson Publishing, 9t One Songs, Ariose Music, So Essential Tunes, Crystallized Tunes of MercyMe
- "Eye of the Storm"
  - (writers) Bryan Fowler, Ryan Stevenson (publishers) Songs of Emack, Universal Music – Brentwood Benson Publishing, Capitol CMG Genesis, TrueMuse
- "Feel Invincible"
  - (writers) John Cooper, Seth Mosley (publishers) Landrum Publishing, BMG Platinum Songs, BMG Rights Management LLC, 2 Hour Songs, Centric Songs
- "Great Are You Lord"
  - (writers) David Leonard, Jason Ingram, Leslie Jordan (publishers) Integrity's Alleluia! Music, Integrity's Praise! Music, Open Hands Music, So Essential Tunes
- "King of the World"
  - (writers) Sam Mizell, Becca Mizell, Natalie Grant (publisher) SeeSeeBubba Songs, Maxx Melodies, BMG Platinum Songs, Takin It to the Maxx
- "O Come to the Altar"
  - (writers) Chris Brown, Mack Brock, Steven Furtick, Wade Joye (publishers) Music by Elevation Worship Publishing
- "The Lion and the Lamb"
  - (writers) Brenton Brown, Brian Johnson, Leeland Mooring (publishers) Meaux Mercy, Thankyou Music, The Devil Is A Liar! Publishing, Bethel Music Publishing
- "Thy Will"
  - (writers) Bernie Herms, Emily Lynn Weisband, Hillary Scott (publishers) Songs of Universal, Inc., W. B. M. Music, Warner-Tamerlane Publishing Corp., WB Music Corp.
- "**What a Beautiful Name**"
  - **(writers) Ben Fielding, Brooke Ligertwood** (publisher) Hillsong Music Publishing

Songwriter of the Year

- **Bart Millard**
- Chris Tomlin
- Hillary Scott
- Kirk Franklin
- Lauren Daigle

Songwriter of the Year (Non-artist)

- **Bernie Herms**
- Bryan Fowler
- Jonathan Smith
- Mia Fieldes
- Michael Farren

Contemporary Christian Artist of the Year

- **Casting Crowns**, Provident Label Group
- Danny Gokey, BMG Rights Management
- Kari Jobe, Sparrow Records
- NEEDTOBREATHE, Atlantic Recording Corporation
- Zach Williams, Provident Label Group

Southern Gospel Artist of the Year

- David Phelps, Spring House Productions
- Ernie Haase & Signature Sound, StowTown Records
- **Gaither Vocal Band**, Spring House Music Group
- Joey + Rory, Spring House Music Group
- Karen Peck & New River, Daywind Records

Gospel Artist of the Year

- **CeCe Winans**, Pure Springs Gospel
- Kirk Franklin, Fo Yo Soul Recordings/RCA Records
- Tamela Mann, TillyMann Music Group
- Tasha Cobbs Leonard, Motown Gospel
- Travis Greene, RCA Inspiration

Artist of the Year

- Chris Tomlin, sixstepsrecords/Sparrow Records
- for KING & COUNTRY, Word Entertainment
- Hillsong UNITED, Hillsong Music Australia/Sparrow Records
- **MercyMe**, Fair Trade Services
- TobyMac, ForeFront Records

New Artist of the Year

- Bri, Marquis Boone Enterprises/Tyscot Records
- Micah Tyler, Fair Trade Services
- Social Club Misfits, Capitol CMG Label Group
- Steven Malcom, Word Entertainment
- **Zach Williams**, Provident Label Group

Producer of the Year

- Tommy Sims and Alvin Love III (Team)
- **Bernie Herms**
- Colby Wedgeworth
- Michael Guy Chislett
- Tommee Profitt
- Wayne Haun

=== Rap/Hip Hop ===
Rap/Hip Hop Recorded Song of the Year

- **"Oh Lord" – NF**
  - **(writers) Nate Feuerstein, David Garcia**
- "Party in the Hills (feat. Andy Mineo & Hollyn)" – Steven Malcolm
  - (writers) Steven Malcolm, Scootie, Andy Mineo
- "Billion Years" – Trip Lee
  - (writers)

Rap/Hip Hop Album of the Year

- The Misadventures of Fern and Marty – Social Club Misfits
  - (producers) Elvin "Wit" Shahbazian, 42 North, Tommy Revenge, Ruslan Odnoralov, Black Knight, Raymond Castro, Social Club Misfits
- Steven Malcolm – Steven Malcolm
  - (producer) Joseph Prielozny
- **The Waiting Room – Trip Lee**
  - **(producer) Gabriel Azucena, James Foye III, John McNeil, Joel McNeil, Alex Medina, Allen Swoope, Almando Cresso, Chris Mackey, Joseph Prielozny, Tyshane Thompson**

=== Rock/Contemporary ===
Rock/Contemporary Recorded Song of the Year

- "Run Devil Run" – Crowder
  - (writers) David Crowder, Rebecca Lauren Olds, Solomon Olds
- **"HARD LOVE (feat. Lauren Daigle)" – NEEDTOBREATHE**
  - **(writers) Bo Rinehart, Bear Rinehart**
- "Feel Invincible" – Skillet
  - (writers) John Cooper, Seth Mosley

Rock/Contemporary Album of the Year

- American Prodigal – Crowder
  - (producers) David Crowder, David Garcia, Solomon Olds, Ed Cash, Hank Bentley
- **H A R D L O V E – NEEDTOBREATHE**
  - **(producers) NEEDTOBREATHE, Jon Levine, Dave Tozer, Ed Cash, Ido Zmishlany**
- Unleashed – Skillet
  - (producers) Kevin Churko, Kane Churko, Brian Howes, Seth Mosley, Mike "X" O'Connor

=== Pop/Contemporary ===
Pop/Contemporary Recorded Song of the Year

- "Priceless" – for KING & COUNTRY
  - (writers) Luke Smallbone, Joel Smallbone, Seth Mosley, Tedd Tjornhom, Ben Backus
- "Come Alive (Dry Bones)" – Lauren Daigle
  - (writers) Lauren Daigle, Michael Farren
- "Even If" – MercyMe
  - (writers) Bart Millard, Ben Glover, Crystal Lewis, David Garcia, Tim Timmons
- **"Eye of the Storm (featuring GabeReal)" – Ryan Stevenson**
  - **(writers) Bryan Fowler, Ryan Stevenson**
- **"Chain Breaker" – Zach Williams**
  - **(writers) Jonathan Smith, Mia Fieldes, Zach Williams**

(Note: There is a tie between "Eye of the Storm (featuring GabeReal)" by Ryan Stevenson and "Chain Breaker" by Zach Williams for the Pop/Contemporary Recorded Song of the Year Award.)

Pop/Contemporary Album of the Year

- The Very Next Thing – Casting Crowns
  - (producer) Mark A. Miller
- Rise – Danny Gokey
  - (producers) Mitchell Solarek, Bernie Herms
- The River – Jordan Feliz
  - (producers) Joshua Silverberg, Colby Wedgeworth
- **Lifer – MercyMe**
  - **(producers) Ben Glover, David Garcia**
- Chain Breaker – Zach Williams
  - (producer) Jonathan Smith

=== Southern Gospel ===
Southern Gospel Recorded Song of the Year

- "The Right Hand of Fellowship" – Bradley Walker
  - (writers) Larry Cordle, Leslie Winn Satcher
- **"Better Together" – Gaither Vocal Band**
  - **(writers) William J. Gaither, Reba Rambo-McGuire, Dony McGuire, Chip Davis**
- "Here He Comes" – Joseph Habedank
  - (writers) Joseph Habedank, Chris Cron, Tony Wood
- "I Choose Christ" – Karen Peck & New River
  - (writers) Gerald Crabb, Jason Cox, Sue C. Smith
- "Never Forsaken" – Tribute Quartet
  - (writers) Wayne Haun, Joel Lindsey

Southern Gospel Album of the Year

- Better Together – Gaither Vocal Band
  - (producers) Ben Isaacs, David Phelps, Bill Gaither
- Classics – Guy Penrod
  - (producer) Guy Penrod
- **Resurrection – Joseph Habedank**
  - **(producer) Wayne Haun**
- Lift Him Up – The Guardians
  - (producer) Wayne Haun
- Here for You – Tribute Quartet
  - (producer) Wayne Haun

=== Bluegrass/Country/Roots ===
Bluegrass/Country/Roots Recorded Song of the Year

- "Don't Give Up on Me" – Bradley Walker
  - (writers) Jimmy Yeary, Rory Feek
- "Little White Church House" – Doug Anderson
  - (writers) Rachel McCutcheon, Marcia Henry, Denny Livingston
- "**When Grandpa Sang Amazing Grace**" – Nelons
  - **(writers) Wayne Haun, Barbara Huffman**
- "Back to God" – Reba McEntire
  - (writers) Dallas Davidson, Randy Houser
- "Rocks" – The Isaacs
  - (writers) Jimmy Yeary, Sonya Isaacs Yeary, Rebecca Isaacs Bowman

Bluegrass/Country/Roots Album of the Year

- Call Me Old-Fashioned – Bradley Walker
  - (producers) Rory Feek, Bradley Walker
- **Sing It Now: Songs of Faith & Hope – Reba McEntire**
  - **(producers) Reba McEntire, Jay DeMarcus, Doug Sisemore**
- Nature's Symphony in 432 – The Isaacs
  - (producer) Ben Isaacs

=== Contemporary Gospel/Urban ===
Contemporary Gospel/Urban Recorded Song of the Year

- "Trust in You" – Anthony Brown & Group therAPy
  - (writer) Anthony Brown
- "Never Have To Be Alone" – CeCe Winans
  - (writers) Alvin Love III, Dwan Hill
- "Father Jesus Spirit" – Fred Hammond
  - (writers) Fred Hammond, Derek "DC" Clark, Shelton Summons
- **"My World Needs You" – Kirk Franklin**
  - **(writer) Kirk Franklin**
- "Work It Out" – Tye Tribbett
  - (writers) Tye Tribbett, Jevon Hill

Urban Worship Recorded Song of the Year

- "Victory Belongs To Jesus" – Todd Dulaney
  - (writer)
- **"Joy" – VaShawn Mitchell**
  - **(writers) Pat Barrett, Tony Brown**
- "Everlasting God" – William Murphy
  - (writer) Fellowship Church

Contemporary Gospel/Urban Album of the Year

- **Let Them Fall in Love – CeCe Winans**
  - **(producers) Alvin Love III, Tommy Sims**
- Worship Journal Live – Fred Hammond
  - (producers) Fred Hammond, Calvin Rogers, Phillip Feaster,
- One Way – Tamela Mann
  - (producers) Myron Butler, Tamela Mann, Kirk Franklin, Timbaland, Eric Dawkins, King Logan, Shaun Martin, David Mann
- Secret Place – VaShawn Mitchell
  - (producers) VaShawn Mitchell, Thomas Hardin Jr.
- Demonstrate – William Murphy
  - (producer) Aaron Lindsey

=== Traditional Gospel ===
Traditional Gospel Recorded Song of the Year

- "You're Bigger" – Jekalyn Carr
  - (writer) Allundria Carr
- **"Change Me" – Tamela Mann**
  - (writer) Thomas Clay
- "Fix Me" – Tim Bowman Jr.
  - (writers) Aaron W. Lindsey, Israel Houghton, Tim Bowman Jr.

Traditional Gospel Album of the Year

- **The Journey LIVE – Donnie McClurkin**
  - (producers) Donnie McClurkin, Trent Phillips, Tre' Corley
- Azusa The Next Generation 2: Better – Hezekiah Walker
  - (producers) Donald Lawrence, Hezekiah Walker
- You Deserve It – J.J. Hairston Youthful Praise
  - (producer) J.J. Hairston

=== Spanish ===
Spanish Language Recorded Song of the Year

- "El Sonido del Silencio (Ranchera)" – Alex Campos
  - (writer) Alex Campos
- "Generación De Fuego" – Joivan Jiménez
  - (writer) Joivan Jiménez
- "JESÚS" – Lead
  - (writers) Pedro Pablo Quintero, Carlos Escobar
- "Dios De Lo Imposible" – Marco Barrientos
  - (writer) David Reyes
- **"No Hay Lugar Más Alto (Feat. Christine D'Clario)" – Miel San Marcos**
  - **(writers) Josue 'Josh' Morales, Luis Morales Jr.**

Spanish Album of the Year

- Sesiones Orgánicas – Coalo Zamorano
  - (producer) Coalo Zamorano
- **Confío – Jaci Velasquez**
  - **(producers) David Leonard, Chris Bevins**
- Besos En La Frente – Jesús Adrián Romero
  - (producer) Adrián Roberto Romero
- El Encuentro – Marco Barrientos
  - (producer) Jose Olide
- Sé Quién Eres Tú (feat. Su Presencia) – Planetshakers
  - (producer) Joth Hunt

=== Worship ===
Worship Song of the Year

- "Ever Be"
  - (writers) Kalley Heiligenthal, Gabriel Wilson, Chris Greely, Bobby Strand (publisher) Bethel Music Publishing
- "The Lion and the Lamb"
  - (writers) Leeland Mooring, Brenton Brown, Brian Johnson (publishers) Meaux Mercy, Thankyou Music, The Devil Is A Liar! Publishing, Bethel Music Publishing
- "O Come to the Altar"
  - (writers) Chris Brown, Mack Brock, Steven Furtick, Wade Joye (publisher) Music by Elevation Worship Publishing
- "**What a Beautiful Name**"
  - **(writers) Ben Fielding, Brooke Ligertwood** (publisher) Hillsong Music Publishing
- "Fierce"
  - (writers) Mia Fieldes, Josh Silverberg, Chris Quilala (publishers) Jesus Culture Music, Capitol CMG Genesis, Upside Down Under, Capitol CMG Amplifier, Red Red Pop, Be Essential Songs

Worship Album of the Year

- **Never Lose Sight – Chris Tomlin**
  - **(producers) Ross Copperman, Jeremy Edwardson, Ed Cash**
- There Is a Cloud – Elevation Worship
  - (producers) Mack Brock, Aaron Robertson
- Let There Be Light – Hillsong Worship
  - (producers) Michael Guy Chislett, Joel Houston, Brooke Ligertwood
- The Garden – Kari Jobe
  - (producer) Jeremy Edwardson
- Frontiers – Vertical Worship
  - (producer) Jacob Sooter

=== Other categories ===
Christmas / Special Event Album of the Year

- **Tennessee Christmas – Amy Grant**
  - **(producers) Mac McAnally, Marshall Altman, Ed Cash**
- Behold – Lauren Daigle
  - (producers) Paul Mabury, Jason Ingram
- These Christmas Lights – Matt Redman
  - (producer) Bernie Herms
- Beatitudes – Stu Garrard
  - (producers) Stuart Garrard, Paul Moak
- The Shack: Music From and Inspired By the Original Motion Picture – Various
  - (producers) Kevin Weaver, Pete Ganbarg, Anastasia Brown

Musical / Choral Collection of the Year

- Come Let Us Adore
  - (creators) Sue C. Smith, Russell Mauldin
- **For The Sake of Love**
  - **(creators) Lee Black, Cliff Duren, Camp Kirkland, Steve Mauldin, Phil Nitz**
- Hope Alive in Me
  - (creators) Travis Cottrell, David Moffitt, Sue C. Smith
- Shepherds and Kings
  - (creators) Joel Lindsey, Jeff Bumgardner, Heidi Petak, Daniel Semsen
- While The World Slept
  - (creators) Jason Cox, Phillips Keveren, Cliff Duren, Camp Kirkland, Phil Nitz

Recorded Music Packaging of the Year

- American Prodigal – Crowder
  - (Art Directors) Toni Crowder, Shelley Giglio, Mike McCloskey, Leighton Ching, (Designer) Leighton Ching, (Photographers) Mary Caroline Russell, Eric Brown
- Outlive – Deluxe Edition – Demon Hunter
  - (Art Director and Graphic Designer) Ryan Clark, (Illustrators) Indra Nugroho, Tony Midi, Eugen Poe, (Photographer) Jana Early
- **The Garden – Kari Jobe**
  - **(Art Directors) Ezra & Jillian Cohen, Lindsey Pruitt, (Graphic Artist) Lindsey Pruitt, (Photographer) Cameron Powell**
- H A R D L O V E – NEEDTOBREATHE
  - (Art Directors) Bo Rinehart, Eric Hurtgen, (Photographer) Joshua Drake
- Everything Was Sound – Silent Planet
  - (Art Director, Graphic Artist and Illustrator) Jordan Butcher

=== Videos ===
Short Form Video of the Year

- Jesus – Chris Tomlin
  - (director) Sean Hagwell (producer) Kirsten Raye
- **Run Devil Run – Crowder**
  - **(director) Nate Corrona (producers) Leighton Ching & Shelley Giglio**
- Prada – Jimi Cravity
  - (director) Sean Hagwell (producers) Kirsten Raye, Leighton Ching & Shelley Giglio
- Trouble – The New Respects
  - (director) Ry Cox (producer) Loren Hughes
- Bring on the Holidays – TobyMac
  - (director) Allan Rosenow (producer) Nicole Rosenow

Long Form Video of the Year

- There is a Cloud Live – Elevation Worship
  - (director) Doug Wilder, (producer) Haley Sliger, (photographer) Christian Schultz
- Let There Be Light – Hillsong Worship
  - (directors) Sebastian Strand, Neal Johnson (producer) Ben Field
- **Of Dirt & Grace – Hillsong United**
  - **(directors) Joel Houston, Davie Rubie (producer) Jason Strong**
- Overflow – Planetshakers
  - (director) Mike Pilmer (producers) Sam Evans, Joth Hunt, Mike Pilmer
- Hits Deep Live – TobyMac
  - (director) Eric Welch (producer) Ben J. Stansbury

=== Films ===
- Ben-Hur
  - (director) Timur Bekmambetov (producers) LightWorkers Media, Metro-Goldwyn-Mayer (MGM), Paramount Pictures, Sean Daniel Company
- I'm Not Ashamed
  - (director) Brian Baugh (producers) Visible Pictures, Big Film Factory, Pure Flix Entertainment
- Priceless
  - (director) Ben Smallbone (producer) Roadside Attractions
- The Case for Christ
  - (director) Jon Gunn (producers) Triple Horse Studios, Pure Flix Entertainment
- **The Shack**
  - **(directors) Stuart Hazeldine (producers) Netter Productions, Summit Entertainment**
