= La Esperanza Frente a Mi =

Studio album (reissue) by Danny Gokey
- Released: July 29, 2016
- Genre: Christian pop; Latin pop; blue-eyed soul; salsa
- Language: Spanish
- Label: BMG

Danny Gokey chronology
| Christmas Is Here (2015) | La Esperanza Frente a Mi (2016) | Rise (2017) |

Singles from La Esperanza Frente a Mi
- 1. "Que Tu Corazón Vuelva a Latir" Released: May 6, 2016

La Esperanza Frente a Mi is the fourth studio album recorded by American singer Danny Gokey. La Esperanza Frente a Mi was re-recorded in Spanish from the Hope in Front of Me (2014) album. The album was released on July 29, 2016, through BMG Rights Management. It was supported by the single "Que Tu Corazón Vuelva a Latir", which was released to promote both versions of the album.

== Content ==
La Esperanza Frente a Mi is a track-by-track re-recording of Hope in Front of Me, performed in Spanish. Gokey describes the collection as songs that "defined his life" and became the "soundtrack to his mission." The album contains a tropical remix of "Que Tu Corazón Vuelva a Latir" and a salsa remix of "La Esperanza Frente a Mi."

Gokey was inspired to learn Spanish by his late first wife, Sophia, who was Latina. He struggled with the language in high school.

== Promotion ==
On May 6, 2016, Gokey released an extended play containing five language-variant versions of the third single from Hope in Front of Me, titled "Tell Your Heart to Beat Again." The collection included the original, a Spanglish version, and a purely Spanish version titled "Que Tu Corazón Vuelva a Latir," in addition to two remixes of the original. While not promoted to the Latin American market, the original English version succeeded in the Christian market.

Gokey also premiered the salsa remix of the title track, "La Esperanza Frente a Mi," exclusively on Billboard the day before the album's release, on July 28, 2016.

== Track listing ==
NOTE: These songs are Spanish-language translations of Danny Gokey songs in English. The original English-language song is listed next to each title.

| No. | Title | Writer(s) | Length |
|---|---|---|---|
| 1. | "La Esperanza Frente a Mi (Hope in Front of Me)" | Danny Gokey; Bernie Herms; Brett James | 3:42 |
| 2. | "Soy Más De Lo Que Piensas (More Than You Think I Am)" | Gokey; Herms; Tim Nichols | 4:01 |
| 3. | "Que Tu Corazón Vuelva a Latir (Tell Your Heart to Beat Again)" | Herms; Randy Phillips; Matthew West | 4:01 |
| 4. | "La Joya Más Especial (Better Than Gold)" | Gokey; Herms; Drew Ramsey | 4:19 |
| 5. | "Una Vida (One Life)" | Gokey; Marcus Hummon; Keith Thomas | 3:37 |
| 6. | "Este Es El Milagro (This Is What It Means)" | Gokey; Stephanie Lewis; Thomas | 4:17 |
| 7. | "El Amor Rompe Barreras (Love Will Take You Places)" | Gokey; Blake Bollinger; Ben Stennis | 3:36 |
| 8. | "Llega Al Límite (Take It to the Limit)" | Gokey; Josh Crosby; Aaron Sprinkle | 3:46 |
| 9. | "Más Que Hermosa (Pretty Beautiful)" | Ben Caver; Megan Connor; Brian White | 3:09 |
| 10. | "Es Por Ti (Because of You)" | Gokey; Jeff Pardo; Molly Reed | 3:18 |
| 11. | "Nada Está Terminado (It's Not Over)" | Gokey; Lewis; Thomas | 4:22 |
| 12. | "Que Tu Corazón Vuelva a Latir (Tell Your Heart to Beat Again)" (Tropical remix) | Herms; Phillips; West | 3:52 |
| 13. | "La Esperanza Frente a Mi (Hope in Front of Me)" (Salsa remix) | Gokey; Herms; James | 3:19 |
| Total length: | | | 49:19 |

== Chart performance ==
| Chart (2016) | Peak position |
|---|---|
| US Top Latin Albums (Billboard) | 27 |
| US Latin Pop Albums (Billboard) | 6 |
