= Rise (Danny Gokey album) =

Studio album by Danny Gokey
- Released: January 13, 2017
- Genre: Christian pop
- Length: 43:05
- Label: BMG
- Producers: Bernie Herms; Ben Glover; Melvin Lightford; Jeff Sojka; Bryan Todd; Colby Wedgeworth; Joshua Zeger

Danny Gokey chronology
La Esperanza Frente a Mi (2016)	Rise (2017)	Haven't Seen It Yet (2019)

Singles from Rise
- 1. "Rise" Released: August 11, 2016; 2. "The Comeback" Released: April 28, 2017; 3. "Masterpiece" Released: April 17, 2018; 4. "If You Ain't in It" Released: July 17, 2018

Rise is the fifth studio album by American singer Danny Gokey. It was released on January 13, 2017, through BMG Rights Management. His second full-length album of original material in the Contemporary Christian genre, Rise serves as the follow-up to Gokey's top 40 album, Hope in Front of Me (2014). The album's title track was released in August 2016 as the record's lead single.

== Background ==
In January 2014, Gokey released his first Christian single, "Hope in Front of Me". That June, he released his second studio album, also titled Hope in Front of Me, which debuted at number one on the Billboard Christian Albums chart. Over the next two years, Gokey released two more albums – a Christmas collection, titled Christmas Is Here (2015), and a Spanish language re-recording of Hope in Front of Me, titled La Esperanza Frente a Mi (2016).

Following the release of Hope in Front of Me, Gokey began writing and recording new songs. Nine of the eleven songs on Rise were co-written by Gokey, drawing on his personal experiences. The album also features two collaborations – "Chasing", with fellow American Idol alumnus Jordin Sparks, and "Better Than I Found It", with gospel singer Kierra "Kiki" Sheard. Rise became available for pre-order on November 15, 2016.

== Singles ==
The title track, "Rise", was released to digital retailers on August 11, 2016, as the album's first single. It officially impacted Christian radio on September 2, 2016. The song has reached a peak position of 5 on the Billboard Christian Songs chart.

"The Comeback" hit Christian radio on April 28, 2017, as the album's second single.

"Masterpiece" was released on April 17, 2018, as the album's third single.

“Masterpiece” debuts between the Top 20 and the Top 30 on the Billboard Christian AC Airplay Chart at #27 for 11 weeks starting on April 21, 2018.

"If You Ain't in It" was released on July 7, 2018, as the fourth and final single from the album.

== Awards and accolades ==
In 2017, Rise was nominated for a GMA Dove Award in the Pop/Contemporary Album of the Year category at the 48th Annual GMA Dove Awards. It was also nominated for at the 2018 Grammy Awards for Best Contemporary Christian Music Album.

== Track listing ==
No.	Title	Writer(s)	Length
1.	"Stronger Than We Think"	Danny Gokey; Bernie Herms; Emily Weisband	3:38
2.	"If You Ain't in It"	Gokey; Ben Glover; Brian White	3:04
3.	"Rise"	Gokey; Benji Cowart; Josh Brownleewe	3:39
4.	"Masterpiece"	Herms; Weisband	4:14
5.	"The Comeback"	Gokey; Joshua Silverberg; Cameron James	3:11
6.	"Slow Down"	Gokey; Herms; Weisband	3:50
7.	"Never Be the Same"	Gokey; Anthony Shy Carter; Colby Wedgeworth	3:13
8.	"What Love Can Do"	Gokey; Herms; Drew Ramsey	4:01
9.	"Chasing" (featuring Jordin Sparks)	Gokey; Herms; Weisband	3:55
10.	"Symptoms"	Gokey; Jeff Sojka; Jimmy Burney; Josh Zegan	3:19
11.	"Better Than I Found It" (featuring Kierra Sheard)	Bobby Hamrick; James Slater; Priscilla Renea	3:09
12.	"Stronger Than We Think" (Bryan Todd remix)	Gokey; Herms; Weisband	3:52
Total length:			43:05

== Personnel ==
- Danny Gokey – vocals, backing vocals
- Bernie Herms – keyboards, acoustic piano, programming, drum programming, horn arrangements, string arrangements, backing vocals
- Ben Glover – keyboards, programming, backing vocals
- Fred Williams – programming
- Casey Brown – keyboards, programming, drum programming
- Colby Wedgeworth – programming, guitars
- Melvin Lightford – acoustic piano, organ, programming
- Jeff Sojka – keyboards, bass, horns, drum programming
- Jordan Sapp – programming, guitars
- Luke Fredrickson – guitars
- Jerry McPherson – guitars
- Hank Bentley – acoustic guitars, squeezebox
- |Drew Ramsey – electric guitars
- Josh Lutz – acoustic guitars, electric guitars
- Tony Lucido – bass
- Austin Nesbitt – bass
- Paul Mabury – drums
- Matt Bubel – drums
- Bryan Todd – drums
- Marcus Huber – percussion
- Doug Moffet – tenor saxophone
- Jeff Adams – trombone
- Barry Green – trombone
- Steve Patrick – trumpet
- Keith Smith – trumpet, horn arrangements, horn contractor
- Matt Lepsis – horns
- Felicia Barton – backing vocals
- Jimmy Burney – backing vocals
- Timothy Johnson – backing vocals
- Josh Zegan – backing vocals
- Devonne Fowlkes – alto vocals
- Debi Selby – alto vocals
- Nate Bean – tenor vocals
- Ronnie Robertson – tenor vocals
- Maureen Murphy – soprano vocals
- Emoni Wilkins – soprano vocals
- Jordin Sparks – vocals (9)
- Kierra Sheard – vocals (11)

Choir

- Kala Balch, Shoshana Bean, Tim Davis, Luke Edgemon, Missi Hale, Keri Larson, David Loucks, Samantha Nelson, Tiffany Palmer, and Brandon Winbush

== Charts ==
Chart (2017)	Peak position
US Billboard 200	32
US Top Christian Albums (Billboard)	1
US Independent Albums (Billboard)	3

== Release history ==
Country	Date	Format	Label	Ref.
North America	January 13, 2017	CD	BMG	
North America	January 13, 2017	Digital download	BMG	
