= Second Hand Heart =

Second Hand Heart may refer to:

- Second Hand Heart (album), a 2015 album by Dwight Yoakam
- "Second Hand Heart" (Ben Haenow song)
- "Second Hand Heart" (Danny Gokey song)
- "Second Hand Heart" (Gary Morris song)
- Second-Hand Hearts, a 1981 American comedy film directed by Hal Ashby

== See also ==
- Hand heart, a gesture in which a person forms a heart shape using their fingers
- Second hand (disambiguation)
