= Ryan Stevenson (singer) =

American Christian singer, musician and guitarist

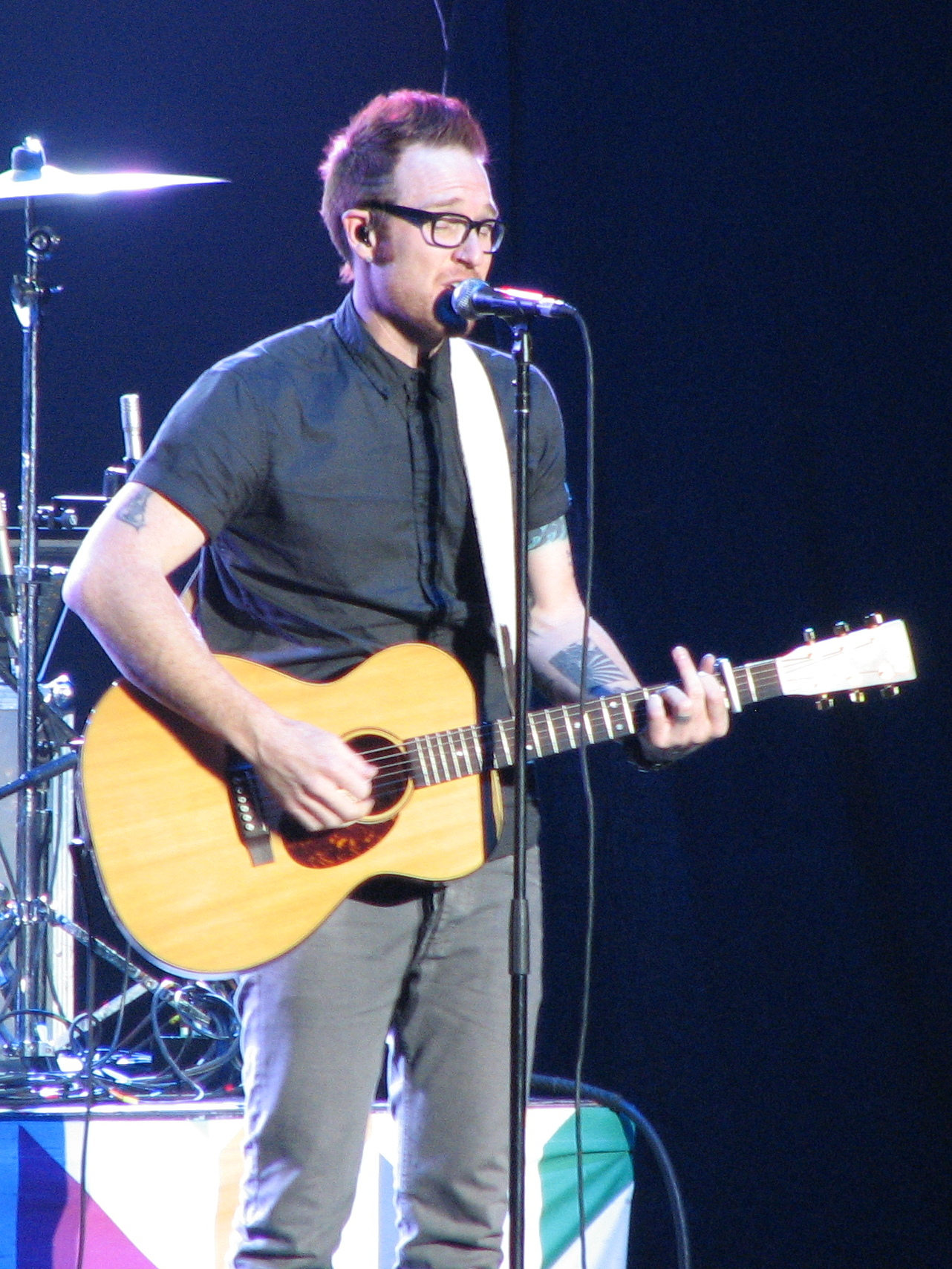
- Stevenson performing in 2015

Background information
- Born: Ryan Dale Stevenson; January 21, 1979 (age 47); Bonanza, Oregon, U.S.
- Origin: Boise, Idaho
- Genres: Contemporary Christian music, contemporary worship music
- Occupations: Singer, musician, songwriter
- Instruments: Vocals, guitar
- Years active: 2003–present
- Labels: Gotee, BEC
- Website: ryanstevensonmusic.com

Ryan Dale Stevenson (born January 21, 1979) is an American Christian music singer, musician and guitarist, who primarily plays a contemporary Christian music and worship style of music. He is signed to Gotee Records and TobyMac is a co-owner of the label. Stevenson released three extended plays, Yesterday, Today, Forever, with BEC Recordings; Champion of the World, independently; and Hold Nothing Back, with Gotee Records. His first studio album, Fresh Start, was released on September 18, 2015, with Gotee Records. He's had five songs chart on the Billboard charts, "Holding Nothing Back", "The Human Side", "Not Forgotten", "All Yours" and "Eye of the Storm".

== Early life ==
Ryan Dale Stevenson was born on January 21, 1979 in Bonanza, Oregon, to James and Phyllis; he has an older sister, Janay. He grew up in the church singing hymns. He was given his first guitar when he was 18.

Stevenson credits his mother as the one who fostered his musical skills while growing up, through her prayers and support for his chosen profession. His mother died of bone cancer on October 3, 2009, at 58 years old. He attended Northwest Christian College in Eugene, Oregon where he honed his musical talent with his roommate, Paul Wright. They formed a small band, primarily focusing on acoustic music and performing at local restaurants in and around Eugene.

== Music career ==
His music career commenced in 2003. However, his first release, an independently made album, Running to You, was not released, until June 12, 2007, by Off the Vine Music. He released, The Undiscovered, independently in 2010. The first extended play, Yesterday, Today, Forever, was released on February 15, 2011, with BEC Recordings. He released, a second extended play, Champion of the World, independently, on July 1, 2012. His third extended play, Holding Nothing Back, was released on September 10, 2013, from Gotee Records. Stevenson's songs have appeared on the Billboard magazine charts six-times, with two placing on two charts the Christian Songs and Christian Airplay, and those songs are "Holding Nothing Back", "The Human Side", "Not Forgotten", and "All Yours". The first studio album, Fresh Start, was released on September 18, 2015, by Gotee Records and featured the 15-week No. 1 single "Eye of the Storm". In 2018, he also released No Matter What.

== Personal life ==
Ryan Stevenson is married to Kim. He was the worship minister at Vertical Church. Before his music career began, Stevenson had been a paramedic for seven years.

== Discography ==
=== Independent albums ===
- Running to You (June 12, 2007, Off the Vine)
- The Undiscovered (2010)

=== Studio albums ===
Title	Details	Peak chart positions
Title	Details	US Christ
Fresh Start	Released: September 18, 2015; Label: Gotee; Format: CD, digital download	9
No Matter What	Released: April 6, 2018; Label: Gotee; Format: CD, digital download	35
Wildest Dreams	Released: June 5, 2020; Label: Gotee; Format: CD, digital download	45
Able	Released: April 28, 2023; Label: Gotee; Format: CD, digital download	—

=== Extended plays ===
- Yesterday, Today, Forever (February 15, 2011, BEC)
- Champion of the World (July 1, 2012, independent)
- Holding Nothing Back (September 10, 2013, Gotee)
- Weathering the Storm (July 16, 2021, Gotee)
- Valley Lows, Mountain Highs (January 24, 2025, RS/Gotee)
- The Wilderness Diaries (November 7, 2025, Gotee)

=== Singles ===
Title	Year	Peak chart positions			Certifications	Album
Title	Year	US Christ	US Christ Airplay	US Christ AC	Certifications	Album
"Holding Nothing Back"	2013	20	14	24		Holding Nothing Back (EP)
"The Human Side"	2014	48	39	—		Holding Nothing Back (EP)
"Not Forgotten" (featuring tobyMac)	2015	—	30	—		Fresh Start
"All Yours"	2015	—	27	—		Fresh Start
"Eye of the Storm" (featuring GabeReal)	2016	1	1	1	RIAA: Platinum	Fresh Start
"The Gospel"	2017	8	3	4		No Matter What
"This Christmas Eve"	2017	17	9	7		Non-album single
"Lift You Up"	2018	—	34	—		No Matter What
"Faithful" (featuring Amy Grant)	2018	—	—	—		No Matter What
"No Matter What" (featuring Bart Millard)	2018	8	4	3		No Matter What
"Child In Your Arms"	2018	—	28	—		No Matter What
"With Lifted Hands"	2019	13	8	8		No Matter What
"When We Fall Apart"	2019	—	—	—		Wildest Dreams
"Home for Christmas"	2019	49	28	—		Non-album single
"Amadeo (Still My God)"	2020	9	5	8		Wildest Dreams
"Mosaic"	2021	—	—	—		Weathering the Storm (EP)
"Heart and Soul of Christmas"	2021	—	—	—		Non-album singles
"I Cry Jesus"	2022	—	—	—		Non-album singles
"The Great Awakening" (with Danny Gokey)	2022	—	—	—		Non-album singles
"One Star"	2023	—	—	—		Non-album singles
"Just As You Are"	2024	—	—	—		Valley Lows, Mountain Highs (EP)
"Rich" (with Deana Carter)	2024	—	—	—		Valley Lows, Mountain Highs (EP)
"Sails"	2024	—	—	—		Valley Lows, Mountain Highs (EP)
"Tell Me How"	2024	—	—	—		Valley Lows, Mountain Highs (EP)
"Blinded"	2025	—	—	—		Non-album singles
"Bloom"	2025	—	—	—		Non-album singles
"Again"	2025	—	—	—		Non-album singles
"This I Know"	2026	—	30	18		Non-album singles
"Oklahoma"	2026	—	—	—		Non-album singles

=== Other charted songs ===
Title	Year	Peak chart positions		Album
Title	Year	US Christ Air	US Christ AC	Album
"Preach" (with Matt Hammitt)	2025	21	17	Valley Lows, Mountain Highs (EP)

== Awards and nominations ==
GMA Dove Awards

Year	Award	Result
2017	Song of the Year ("Eye of the Storm")	Nominated
2017	Pop/Contemporary Recorded Song of the Year ("Eye of the Storm")	Won*

- * Was a joint win alongside Zach Williams' 'Chain Breaker'.
