= No Matter What =

No Matter What may refer to:

- "No Matter What" (Badfinger song), 1970
- "No Matter What" (Boyzone song), 1998
- "No Matter What" (Calum Scott song), 2018
- "No Matter What" (George Lamond and Brenda K. Starr song), 1990
- "No Matter What" (T.I. song), 2008
- "No Matter What" (Ryan Stevenson song), 2018
- "No Matter What", a song by Aretha Franklin (feat. Mary J. Blige) from So Damn Happy
- "No Matter What", a song by Jeremy Camp from Beyond Measure
- "No Matter What", a song by Heavy D from Vibes
- "No Matter What", a song by Kerrie Roberts
- "No Matter What", a song by Papa Roach from Time for Annihilation: On the Record & On the Road
- "No Matter What", a song from the musical Beauty and the Beast
- No Matter What (TV series), a 2020 South Korean television series

== See also ==
- "No Matta What" (Party All Night), a 2001 song by Toya
- Noh Matta Wat!, Brazilian TV series
- "No Matter Who", a 1997 song by Phil Collins
