= Better Together =

Better Together may refer to:

== Gaming ==
- Bukkit, also known as Better Together, a 2017 Minecraft update allowing cross-platform multiplayer gameplay between Xbox One, Microsoft Windows, Nintendo Switch, iOS and Android

== Music ==
- Better Together (album), a 2016 album by the Gaither Vocal Band
- Better Together (EP), the 2013 debut EP of Fifth Harmony and the title track thereof
- Better Together: The Duet Album, a 1991 compilation album by Johnny Mathis
- "Better Together" (Jack Johnson song), 2005
- "Better Together" (Hayden James song), 2018
- "Better Together" (Luke Combs song), 2020

== Politics ==
- Better Together (campaign), the political campaign for a "No" vote in the Scottish independence referendum, 2014
- Better Together: Restoring the American Community, a book and initiative by Robert Putnam

== Television ==
- Better with You, a 2010 ABC romantic comedy television series, which was also known as Better Together, Couples, Leapfrog, and That Couple
