= Fresh Start (album) =

Studio album by Ryan Stevenson
- Released: September 18, 2015
- Genre: Worship, contemporary Christian music
- Length: 36:18
- Label: Gotee

Ryan Stevenson chronology
Holding Nothing Back (2013)	Fresh Start (2015)	No Matter What (2018)

Fresh Start is the first studio album by Ryan Stevenson. Gotee Records released the album on September 18, 2015. A new version of the album was released in 2016, including 2 bonus tracks: "Holding Nothing Back" and "Eye Of The Storm (Radio Version)".

== Critical reception ==
Professional ratings
Review scores
Source	Rating
365 Days of Inspiring Media	3.5/5 stars
CCM Magazine	4/5 stars
The Christian Beat	4.5/5 stars
Jesus Freak Hideout	3/5 stars
New Release Today	4/5 stars

Awarding the album four stars from CCM Magazine, Andy Argyrakis states, "each of the ten tunes deliver when it comes to mouth-watering sounds and faith fortification". Christopher Smith, giving the album three stars at Jesus Freak Hideout, writes, "Fresh Start is well-produced, catchy, and has an encouraging message of God's love." Signaling in a four star review by New Release Today, Caitlin Lassiter responds, "Fresh Start solidifies Ryan Stevenson's place in the industry. A well-rounded album overall, Ryan has crafted a successful first full length effort with his work here. While a bit more diversity in sound would be nice, what Ryan has done in Fresh Start creates a successful a debut." Rating the album four and a half stars for The Christian Beat, Herb Longs says, "This album is a perfect example of what can transpire when powerful lyrics meet a passionate voice and excellent production." Joshua Andre, indicating in a three and a half star review by 365 Days of Inspiring Media, describes, "Fresh Start by Ryan Stevenson isn't perfect, as there are a couple of tracks that are a bit misplaced, either lyrically or musically."

== Track listing ==
No.	Title	Length
1.	"Fresh Start"	3:47
2.	"All Yours"	2:52
3.	"Mercy Changes Everything"	3:31
4.	"Chasing Your Heart"	3:05
5.	"What You Say"	3:27
6.	"Not Forgotten" (featuring tobyMac)	3:17
7.	"From the Ground Up (Bonanza)"	3:37
8.	"Give It All Away"	3:54
9.	"Dare You to Trust My Love"	3:17
10.	"Eye of the Storm" (featuring GabeReal)	5:31
Total length:		36:18

== Charts ==
Chart performance for Fresh Start
Chart (2016)	Peak position
US Christian Albums (Billboard)	9
