= Lift Up Your Eyes =

Single by Danny Gokey

from the album Christmas Is Here
- Released: September 25, 2015
- Genre: Christmas; Christian pop; blue-eyed soul
- Length: 4:14
- Label: BMG-Chrysalis
- Songwriters: Mia Fieldes; Danny Gokey; Jonathan Smith
- Producer: Keith Thomas

Danny Gokey singles chronology
"More Than You Think I Am" (2015)	"Lift Up Your Eyes" (2015)	"Tell Your Heart to Beat Again" (2016)

"Lift Up Your Eyes" is a song recorded by American singer Danny Gokey for his third studio album, Christmas is Here (2015). One of two original tracks on the record, Gokey co-wrote the song with Mia Fieldes and Jonathan Smith. It was released to digital retailers September 25, 2015 as the album's first and only single, and was later serviced to Christian radio on November 20, 2015 through BMG-Chrysalis. "Lift Up Your Eyes" was Gokey's second top 5 single at Christian AC radio.

== Reception ==
=== Critical ===
Timothy Yap of Hallels called the song a "new classic," praising both Gokey's vocal performance ("'Lift Up Your Eyes' ... can stand alongside holiday favorites thanks to a voice that catapulted Danny into the homes of millions") and "soulful sound."

=== Commercial ===
"Lift Up Your Eyes" entered the Billboard Hot Christian Songs chart at number 39 on the chart dated December 12, 2015; it rose 15 positions the following week to reach number 24. The song peaked at number 17 on the chart dated January 9, 2016. During that week, Gokey placed three songs in the top 25 of the chart ("Lift Up Your Eyes"; his rendition of the holiday classic, "Mary, Did You Know?"; and previous single, "More Than You Think I Am"), tying with Chris Tomlin for the most concurrent entries at that tier. "Lift Up Your Eyes" reached numbers four and 26, respectively, on the format-specific Christian AC and Christian Hot AC/CHR airplay charts, earning Gokey his second top five single on the former.

Forbes ranked "Lift Up Your Eyes" as the seventh most popular "current" holiday song in 2015 (on a list based on sales, streaming, and airplay figures provided by Nielsen SoundScan), one position lower than Gokey's aforementioned rendition of "Mary, Did You Know?".

== Charts ==
Chart (2015–16)	Peak position
US Hot Christian Songs (Billboard)	17

== Release history ==
Country	Date	Format	Label	Ref.
Worldwide	September 25, 2015	Digital download	BMG Rights Management	
United States	November 20, 2015	Christian radio	BMG-Chrysalis	
