= I Will Not Say Goodbye =

Single by Danny Gokey

from the album My Best Days
- Released: June 28, 2010
- Genre: Country
- Length: 3:52
- Label: RCA Nashville/19
- Songwriters: Lari White; Chuck Cannon; Vicky McGehee
- Producer: Mark Bright

Danny Gokey singles chronology
"My Best Days Are Ahead of Me" (2009)	"I Will Not Say Goodbye" (2010)	"Second Hand Heart" (2011)

Music video
- "I Will Not Say Goodbye" on YouTube

"I Will Not Say Goodbye" is a song written by Lari White, Chuck Cannon and Vicky McGehee, and recorded by American Idol season 8 finalist Danny Gokey. It was released in June 2010 as the second single from his debut album My Best Days, which was released on March 2, 2010 via RCA Nashville.

The song garnered positive reviews from critics who called it the best song off My Best Days. "I Will Not Say Goodbye" had minor success in the US, peaking at number 32 on the Billboard Hot Country Songs chart. The accompanying music video was directed by Wes Edwards and tells stories of people who've lost loved ones in life, while including live performances of Gokey performing the song.

== Critical reception ==
Matt Bjorke of Roughstock described the song positively in his review of the album, saying that it "is a definite show stopper". Brian Mansfield of USA Today also said that "It'll be a showstopper live". Jon Caramanica of The New York Times gave a positive review of the song by calling it "devastating" and "by far the album’s best song."

== Music video ==
The music video was directed by Wes Edwards. It tells the stories of people who have lost a husband, a mother, and a son, including footage of Gokey performing the song in a theatre and house in Nashville, Tennessee. The video is almost 7 minutes in length and ends with a dedication to Gokey's late wife, Sophia.

== Commercial performance ==
"I Will Not Say Goodbye" debuted at number 53 on the Billboard Hot Country Songs charts dated for the week ending July 3, 2010. The single peaked at number 32 in August after eleven weeks.

== Charts ==
Chart performance for "I Will Not Say Goodbye"
Chart (2010)	Peak position
US Hot Country Songs (Billboard)	32
US Country Airplay (Billboard)	32
