= My Best Days Are Ahead of Me =

Single by Danny Gokey

from the album My Best Days
- Released: December 26, 2009
- Genre: Country
- Length: 3:07
- Label: RCA Nashville/19
- Songwriters: Kent Blazy; Marv Green
- Producer: Mark Bright

Danny Gokey singles chronology
"My Best Days Are Ahead of Me" (2009)	"I Will Not Say Goodbye" (2010)

Music video
- "My Best Days Are Ahead of Me" on YouTube

"My Best Days Are Ahead of Me" is a song written by Marv Green and Kent Blazy, and recorded by American Idol season 8 finalist Danny Gokey. It was released in December 2009 as the lead-off single from his debut album My Best Days, which was released on March 2, 2010, via RCA Nashville.

== Content ==
In "My Best Days Are Ahead of Me," the narrator looks back at the mistakes he has made in his life, but realizes that his "best days are ahead of [him]."

== History ==
Originally, Gokey's first single was slated to be "It's Only," written by Charles Kelley and Dave Haywood of Lady Antebellum. This song was withdrawn as a single in November 2009 and replaced with "My Best Days Are Ahead of Me."

== Critical reception ==
Karlie Justus of Engine 145 gave the song a thumbs-down. Her review called it "a believable, earnest effort that’s bland and entirely forgettable," and criticized it for a lack of narrative. Matt Bjorke described the song positively in his review of the album, saying that its positive message "aligns nicely with [Gokey]." Deborah Evans Price of Billboard praised Gokey's vocal performance and called the song "the feel-good country song of 2010." Brian Mansfield of USA Today gave a positive review, saying, "With its uptempo tone of tempered optimism, My Best Days Are Ahead of Me is just the right kind of introductory single for Danny."

== Music video ==
The music video was filmed at a warehouse in Nashville, Tennessee and directed by Wes Edwards. It contains footage of Gokey performing the song, interspersed with motivational messages that appear on the screen. Gokey told Country Weekly magazine that he was comfortable filming the video: "I felt like American Idol gave me some experience in being in front of a camera."

== Commercial performance ==
"My Best Days Are Ahead of Me" debuted at number 55 on the Billboard Hot Country Songs charts dated for the week ending December 26, 2009. The song entered the country Top 40 at number 39 on the chart dated for the week ending February 20, 2010. The song also debuted at #82 on the Billboard Hot 100 for the week ending March 20, 2010. The song reached its peak of number 24 on the country chart in May 2010.

== Charts ==
Chart performance for "My Best Days Are Ahead of Me"
Chart (2009–2010)	Peak position
US Billboard Hot 100	82
US Hot Country Songs (Billboard)	24
US Country Airplay (Billboard)	24
US Heatseekers Songs (Billboard)	3
