= Second hand (disambiguation) =

A second hand good is one purchased by or otherwise transferred to a second or later end-user.

Second hand may also refer to:

== Films ==
- Second Hand (2005 film), a Romanian film
- Second Hand (2013 film), an Indian Telugu film

== Music ==
- Second Hand (band), British progressive rock band
- Second Hand (album), 1991 album by Mark Heard
- Second Hand (Marcin Rozynek album), 2012 album by Marcin Rozynek
- "Secondhand" (song), by Don Toliver featuring Rema
- Secondhand Serenade, a solo project of John Vesely (musician)
- "Second Hand", song by Bachman-Turner Overdrive from the album Not Fragile
- "Second Hand", a re-working of the Thing in a Book mix of the 1994 single Dark & Long by Underworld

== Other ==
- Second hand (card player), the player who bids or plays second in a card game
- The hand measuring the passage of seconds on a clock face
- Second hand smoke, inhaled by passive smoking
- Second hand, a term for a mate on a fishing vessel
