= Rise (Danny Gokey song) =

Single by Danny Gokey

from the album Rise
- Released: August 11, 2016 (radio premiere); August 12, 2016 (digital retailers)
- Genre: Christian pop; blue-eyed soul
- Label: BMG
- Songwriter(s): Danny Gokey; Benji Cowart; Josh Brownleewe

Danny Gokey singles chronology
"Tell Your Heart to Beat Again" (2016)	"Rise" (2016)	"The Comeback" (2017)

Music video
- "Rise" on YouTube

"Rise" is a song recorded by American singer Danny Gokey for his fourth album of the same name. The song is the title track and lead single from the album. Rise became Gokey's third No. 1 song on Billboard Christian Airplay chart. According to Gokey, the song is about how he overcame depression a few years prior to the song release.

== Charts ==
Chart	Peak position
Billboard Hot Christian Songs	5
Billboard Christian Airplay	1
