= Haven't Seen It Yet =

Single by Danny Gokey

from the album Haven't Seen It Yet
- Released: January 11, 2019
- Recorded: 2018
- Genre: CCM
- Length: 4:04
- Label: Capitol CMG; Essential Music Publishing; Sparrow
- Songwriters: Danny Gokey; Colby Wedgeworth; Ethan Hulse
- Producer: Dustin Loehrs

Danny Gokey singles chronology
"The Prayer" (2018)	"Haven't Seen It Yet" (2019)	"Wanted" (2019)

Music video
- "Haven't Seen It Yet" on YouTube

"Haven't Seen It Yet" is a song by American contemporary Christian music singer and songwriter Danny Gokey. It is the lead single from his sixth studio album, of the same name.

== Background ==
Gokey spoke about the inspiration for the song "It's for people dealing with disappointment, which often makes people do a lot of things they don't want to do. I was a widower and now I'm married again, but there are many who try to escape the pain of losing a spouse by doing bad things like drugs. So this song is for those people -- not just widows and widowers -- to give them hope. If you've been praying for a long time and haven't found the answer, you're gonna need to look at all the good things that God has done. What you feel now many not be the truest, and God is not finished with you yet. The best is yet to come. It's a song of comfort, hope and to keep people pushing through the dark times."

== Composition ==
"Haven't Seen It Yet" is originally in the key of D Major, with a tempo of 70 beats per minute. Written in common time, Gokey's vocal range spans from A_{5} to B_{3} during the song.

== Critical reception ==
Professional ratings
Review scores
Source	Rating
Cross Rhythms	8/10 squares

Tony Cummings for Cross Rhythms wrote "Haven't Seen It Yet is a beautifully crafted mid-tempo song which is truly faith-building. Danny sings it like he believes every word."

== Commercial performance ==
On June 29, 2019, "Haven't Seen It Yet" peaked at No. 1 on the Billboard Christian Airplay chart, his fourth No. 1. The song has spent three weeks at No. 1 and 30 weeks on the chart altogether. It became his second highest peaking song on the Christian Songs chart, peaking at No. 3.

== Music video ==
A music video for the single "Haven't Seen It Yet" was released on February 1, 2019 starring Danny Gokey, Chopper Bernet, Chelsea Jordan, and Helena Claussen. The video has over fourteen million views on YouTube.

== Accolades ==
Year	Organization	Award	Result	Ref.
2019	Grammy Award	Best Contemporary Christian Music Performance	Nominated	
2019	GMA Dove Awards	Short Form Music Video of the Year	Won	

== Charts ==
=== Weekly charts ===
Weekly chart performance for "Haven't Seen it Yet"
Chart (2019)	Peak position
UK Cross Rhythms Weekly Chart	4
US Hot Christian Songs (Billboard)	3
US Christian Airplay (Billboard)	1
US Christian AC (Billboard)	1

=== Year-end charts ===
2019 year-end chart performance for "Haven't Seen it Yet"
Chart (2019)	Position
UK Cross Rhythms Annual Chart	22
US Christian Songs (Billboard)	5
US Christian Airplay (Billboard)	2
US Christian CHR (Billboard)	8
US Christian AC (Billboard)	4

== Certifications ==
Region	Certification	Certified units/sales
United States (RIAA)	Gold	500,000^{‡}
^{‡} Sales+streaming figures based on certification alone.

== Release history ==
Region	Date	Format	Label	Ref.
United States	February 3, 2019	Christian radio	Sparrow; Capitol CMG	
