= The Comeback (song) =

Single by Danny Gokey

from the album Rise
- Released: April 28, 2017
- Recorded: 2017
- Genre: Christian pop; gospel
- Length: 3:11
- Label: BMG
- Songwriter(s): Gokey; Joshua Silverberg; Cameron James

Danny Gokey singles chronology
"Rise" (2016)	"The Comeback" (2017)	"Masterpiece" (2018)

Music video
- "The Comeback" on YouTube

"The Comeback" is the second single, released on April 28, 2017, from Danny Gokey's fourth album, Rise.

== Composition ==
"The Comeback" is originally in the key of A♭, with a tempo of 118 beats per minute.

== Music video ==
A lyric video was released on April 13, 2017. The video has over seven million views on YouTube.

== Charts ==
=== Weekly charts ===
Chart (2017)	Peak position
US Christian Songs (Billboard)	11
US Christian Airplay (Billboard)	6
US Christian AC (Billboard)	5

=== Year-end charts ===
Chart (2017)	Peak position
US Christian Songs (Billboard)	21
US Christian Airplay (Billboard)	16
US Christian AC (Billboard)	20
US Christian CHR (Billboard)	27
