= Joivan Jiménez =

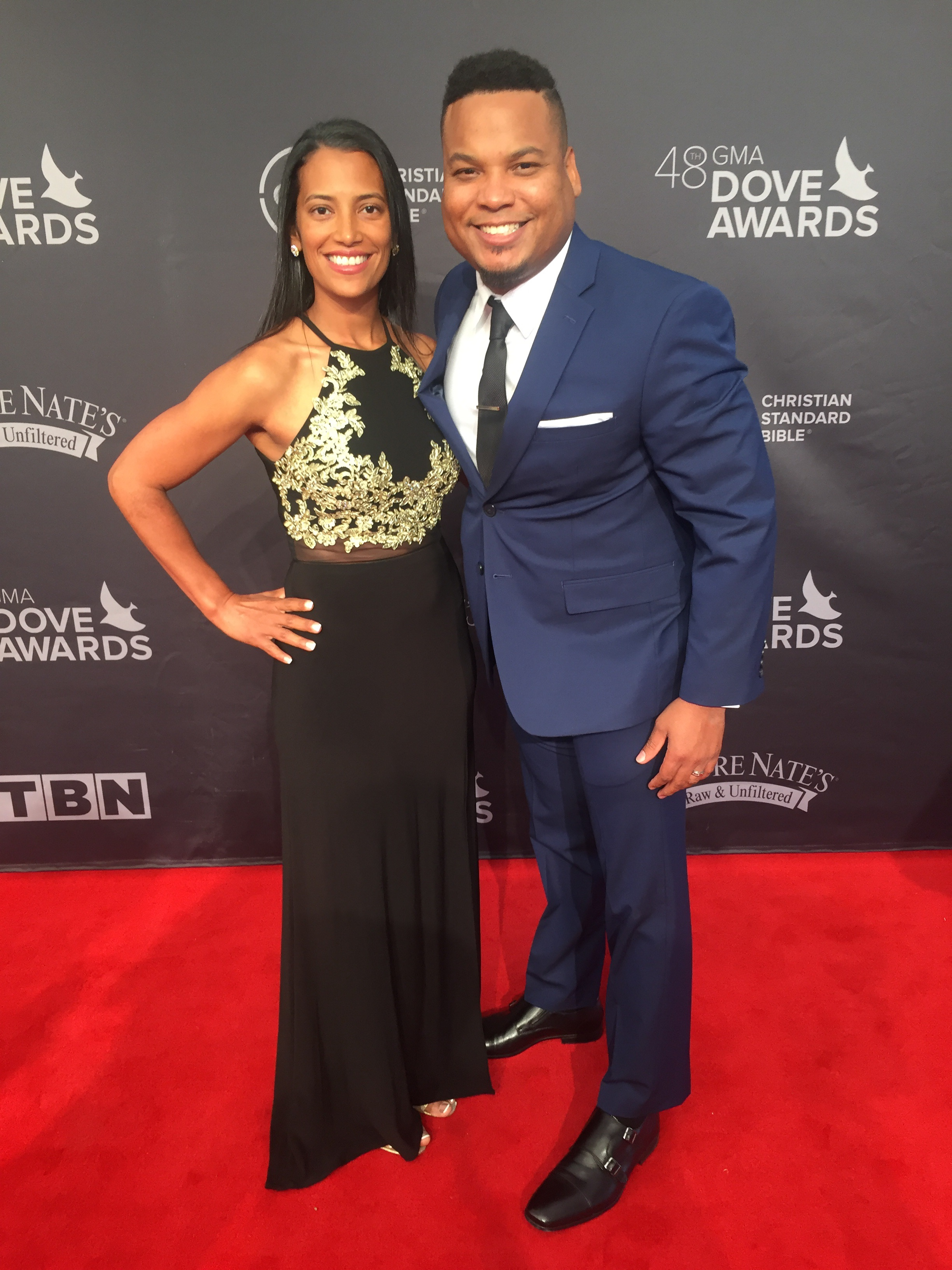
- Joivan with his wife Lucianne at the GMA's 2017 Dove Awards in Nashville, TN.

Background information
- Born: October 25, 1980 (age 45); Panama City Panama
- Genres: Latin, Worship, Latin Worship, Latin R&B
- Occupations: Actor, singer, songwriter, pastor
- Instrument: Vocal
- Label: Joi Music Groups
- Website: joivanjimenez.com

Joivan Jiménez (born October 25, 1980) is a singer-songwriter, musician and actor born in Panama City, Panama. He is a Dove Award-nominated singer and songwriter for the Spanish-Language Recorded Song of The Year "Generación de Fuego." In 2004 he was a member of the group Ordained Praise produced by record producer Justin Boller. The group was signed to a Christian independent record label, Sereniti Records. In 2008 after the group disbanded, Jiménez became a solo artist. In 2012 he played the role of Juan Carlos Reymundo in the Independent film "Stand Your Ground" filmed in Atlanta. Jiménez is the 2012 National Vanheusen Fashion Super Bowl "In Style" sweepstakes winner, featured in ESPN The Next Magazine, GQ Magazine, with others who had been inducted into the Hall of Fame, such as Jerry Rice, Steve Young and Deion Sanders.

== Personal life ==
In 2006, Joivan married Lucianne Lee; they have three children, Yessaira Lee, Joilianne Isabel, and Joivan Alexander.
