= No Matter What (Ryan Stevenson song) =

Single by Ryan Stevenson

from the album No Matter What
- Released: January 26, 2018
- Recorded: 2017–18
- Genre: Worship; contemporary Christian music
- Length: 3:36
- Label: Gotee; BEC
- Songwriters: Ryan Stevenson; Bryan Fowler; Jonathan Smith
- Producer: Bryan Fowler

Ryan Stevenson singles chronology
"Faithful" (2018)	"No Matter What" (2018)	"Child In Your Arms" (2018)

Music video
- "No Matter What" on YouTube

"No Matter What" is a song performed by American Christian musician Ryan Stevenson.The song was released as the third single from his 2018 album No Matter What on January 26, 2018. It features guest vocals from MercyMe frontman Bart Millard. It was released to Christian radio on March 2, 2018. The song peaked at No. 8 on the US Hot Christian Songs chart, becoming his third Top 10 single from that chart. It lasted 26 weeks on the overall chart. The song is played in an A major key, and 79 beats per minute.

== Background ==
"No Matter What" was released as the third single from his second studio album No Matter What, on January 26, 2018. It is the follow-up to Christian radio hit "The Gospel." Stevenson explained his inspiration for writing the song in an interview,"Over the course of the last several years, I've continued to ask the Lord to give me songs that exist for a reason," shares Ryan Stevenson about his new single. "As we were working on this new record, a reoccurring theme I felt the Lord continually whisper to my heart was 'beloved identity.' I, like many of us, grew up in the church- a religious environment, where we weren't necessarily nurtured and taught about Gods grace, patience and compassion. As I continue to grow and experience life, the truth I continue to encounter is 'I am His son, no matter what.' It is easy to fall into the trap of performance based relationship with God when we've been taught in religious environments that He's mostly disappointed with us. This song hopefully will encourage all of us that even though we struggle, Jesus is overseeing the process."

== Music video ==
A music video for the single "No Matter What" was released on July 27, 2018. The visual features Stevenson performing the track in a dark room

== Track listing ==
CD release

1. "No Matter What" – 3:36
2. "No Matter What (Lead Sheet (Medium Key)" – 3:36
3. "No Matter What (Vocal Demonstration)" – 3:27
4. "No Matter What (High Key With Background Vocals)" – 3:27
5. "No Matter What (High Key Without Background Vocals)" – 3:27
6. "No Matter What (Medium Key With Background Vocals)" – 3:27
7. "No Matter What (Medium Key Without Background Vocals)" – 3:27
8. "No Matter What (Low Key With Background Vocals)" – 3:27
9. "No Matter What (Low Key Without Background Vocals)" – 3:27

== Charts ==
=== Weekly charts ===
Chart (2018)	Peak position
US Christian AC (Billboard)	3
US Christian Airplay (Billboard)	5
US Hot Christian Songs (Billboard)	8
US Christian AC Indicator (Billboard)	1

=== Year-end charts ===
Chart (2018)	Peak position
US Christian AC (Billboard)	15
US Christian Airplay (Billboard)	20
US Christian Songs (Billboard)	21

== Release history ==
Region	Date	Format	Label	Ref.
Various	March 2, 2018	Christian radio	Gotee	
United States	January 26, 2018	Digital download (EP); streaming (EP)	Gotee	
