= Second Hand Heart (Danny Gokey song) =

Single by Danny Gokey

from the album Love Again
- Released: July 4, 2011
- Genre: Country pop
- Length: 4:03
- Label: RCA Nashville; 19
- Songwriters: Cary Barlowe; Josh Kear; Shane Stevens
- Producer: Mark Bright

Danny Gokey singles chronology
"I Will Not Say Goodbye" (2010)	"Second Hand Heart" (2011)	"Hope in Front of Me" (2014)

"Second Hand Heart" is a song recorded by American singer Danny Gokey. It was released July 4, 2011 through RCA Records Nashville as the intended lead single for his second studio album; however, he parted ways with the label in November 2011 and that album never materialized. The song was later included on Gokey's self-released 2012 extended play, Love Again. "Second Hand Heart" was written by Cary Barlowe, Josh Kear, and Shane Stevens and was produced by Mark Bright.

== Content ==
"Second Hand Heart" is a country song that incorporates a soulful, raspy vocal and "pop-leaning" production. Lyrically, the song speaks to the emotional baggage people carry and sends the message that a "second hand heart" is still capable of great love.

== Critical reception ==
Matt Bjorke of Roughstock was complimentary of the song, writing that "Second Hand Heart" has "the sound of a song that can and should help re-establish Danny Gokey as a viable country radio star." Billy Dukes of Taste of Country gave the song a more mixed, two-and-a-half-star review and described it as "very vanilla." "On paper, it's a touching tale," he writes, "Sonically, Gokey's voice isn't strong enough to soar through the long stretched out syllables."

== Chart positions ==
"Second Hand Heart" debuted and peaked at number 48 on the Billboard Hot Country Songs chart dated August 27, 2011.

Chart (2011)	Peak position
US Hot Country Songs (Billboard)	48

== Release history ==
Country	Date	Format	Label	Ref.
Worldwide	July 4, 2011	Digital download	RCA Nashville; 19	
United States	August 8, 2011	Country radio	RCA Nashville; 19	
