= Tribute Quartet =

American southern gospel quartet

Tribute
- Genres: Southern gospel
- Years active: 2006–present
- Labels: Daywind
- Members: Gary Casto; Josh Singletary; Gus Gaches; Ian Owens
- Past members: Anthony Davis; Dennis Dugger; Brian Alvey; Riley Harrison Clark; Jacob Kitson
- Website: www.tributequartet.com

Tribute Quartet is an American southern gospel quartet based in Nashville, Tennessee. It was founded by Gary Casto and Josh Singletary in 2006.

== History ==
In 2005 Jackie and Elaine Wilburn retired the Wilburn's and came off the road. Two of the remaining members, Gary Casto and Josh Singletary, formed Monument Quartet with Marshall Pugh and Dennis Dugger. Pugh was known for his time with Vestal Goodman and Dugger had previously sung with the Apostles. After their second project, in December 2006, Casto, Singletary and Dugger left and hired Jacob Kitson to form Tribute Quartet and were signed to BSA World Records.

In 2008, Tribute was named Absolutely Gospel Music's Breakthrough Artist of the Year, were voted the Horizon Group of the Year by readers of Singing News magazine and brought the first change for the quartet when Kitson left the group in June to join Greater Vision. He was replaced at the tenor position by Brian Alvey. In 2009 the group signed with Crossroads Music joining comparable artists such as the Kingdom Heirs and the Talley Trio.

After two years, Alvey left the group in June 2010 for a marketing and promotions job. After a short stint with the Voices of Lee, 18-year old Riley Harrison Clark was chosen to replace him. In early 2011 Dennis Dugger came off the road and was replaced by Anthony Davis as the new bass singer.

In 2014 Tribute Quartet left the Crossroads Music Sonlite label and signed on with Daywind Records.

Their lineup remained the same until 2019, when Riley Harrison Clark left to pursue a solo career. He was replaced by tenor Gus Gaches, who has a long history in the Southern Gospel music spectrum, singing most notably with Legacy Five.

In early 2021, Tribute released a YouTube video announcing that Anthony Davis had left the group and that they had brought on a new bass singer. Several days later, on February 11, 2021, Ian Owens was revealed as the new choice.

Tribute Quartet has made many appearances at the National Quartet Convention, Silver Dollar City, Dollywood, and on television networks such as Fox News, DayStar and TBN.

== Members ==
Current

- Gary Casto – lead (2006–present)
- Josh Singletary – baritone / piano (2006–present)
- Gus Gaches – tenor (2019–present) (formerly of Legacy Five)
- Ian Owens – bass (2021–present) (formerly of Ernie Haase & Signature Sound)

Former

- Anthony Davis – bass (2011–2021)
- Dennis Dugger – bass (2006–2011)
- Brian Alvey – tenor (2008–2010) (went on to Kingdom Heirs)
- Riley Harrison Clark – tenor (2010-2019)
- Jacob Kitson – tenor (2006–2008) (went on to Greater Vision)

== Discography ==
BSA World Records

- 2006 My Tribute
- 2007 Anticipation

Crossroads Music / Sonlite Records

- 2009 For This Time
- 2010 Hit Replay
- 2011 The Waiting Is Over
- 2012 Our Anthem
- 2013 Hit Replay Again

Daywind Records

- 2014 Journey Of Hope
- 2015 The Thought Of Christmas
- 2016 Here For You
- 2017 “Quartet Tribute Vol. 1"
- 2019 "Living The Stories"
- 2020 "Quartet Tribute Vol. 2"

== Awards ==
Year	Award	Result
2007	Singing News Fan Awards Horizon Individual - Josh Singletary	Nominated
2008	AGM Breakthrough Artist of the Year	Won
2008	Singing News Fan Awards Horizon Group of the Year	Won
2013	AGM Traditional Song of the Year "Homecoming Day"	Won
2013	Singing News Fan Awards Favorite Song of the Year	Nominated
2014	AGM Traditional Song of the Year "Good News From Jerusalem"	Won
2014	Singing News Fan Awards - Young Artist of the Year - Riley Harrison Clark	Nominated
2014	Singing News Fan Awards - Baritone - Josh Singletary	Nominated
2015	Singing News Fan Awards - Young Artist of the Year - Riley Harrison Clark	Nominated
2015	Singing News Fan Awards - Baritone - Josh Singletary	Nominated
2015	Singing News Fan Awards - Favorite Song - Everything I Need	Nominated
2015	AGM Album of the Year - Journey of Hope	Nominated
2015	AGM Traditional Song of the Year - Everything I need	Nominated
2015	AGM Male Group of the Year	Nominated
2016	Singing News Fan Awards - Young Artist of the Year - Riley Harrison Clark	Won
2016	Singing News Fan Awards - Baritone - Josh Singletary	Nominated
2016	Singing News Fan Awards - Musician - Josh Singletary	Nominated
2016	AGM Musician of the Year - Josh Singletary	Won
2016	AGM Traditional Song of the Year- I will Rise	Nominated
2016	AGM Special Event Project - Live at Daywind Studios	Nominated
2016	AGM Male Group of the Year	Nominated
2017	Dove Awards - Southern Gospel Album - Here For You	Nominated
2017	Singing News Fan Awards - Tenor - Riley Harrison Clark	Nominated
2017	Singing News Fan Awards - Baritone - Josh Singletary	Nominated
2017	Singing News Fan Awards - Musician - Josh Singletary	Nominated
2018	Singing News Fan Awards - Tenor - Riley Harrison Clark	Nominated
2018	Singing News Fan Awards - Baritone - Josh Singletary	Nominated
2018	Singing News Fan Awards - Musician - Josh Singletary	Nominated
2018	Singing News Fan Awards - Traditional Quartet	Nominated
2018	Singing News Fan Awards - Song of the Year - God of the Storms	Nominated
