= Eye of the Storm (Ryan Stevenson song) =

Single by Ryan Stevenson featuring GabeReal

from the album Fresh Start
- Released: 2016
- Genre: CCM; gospel-pop
- Length: 5:31 (album version); 3:25 (radio mix)
- Label: Gotee
- Songwriters: Ryan Stevenson; Bryan Christopher Fowler
- Producer: Fowler

Ryan Stevenson singles chronology
"All Yours" (2015)	"Eye of the Storm" (2016)	"The Gospel" (2017)

"Eye of the Storm" is a song by American Christian musician Ryan Stevenson featuring fellow American Christian musician GabeReal from the former's 2015 studio album Fresh Start. It peaked at number one on both the Billboard Hot Christian Songs and Christian Airplay charts, his first single to reach such feat.

== Charts ==
Chart performance for "Eye of the Storm"
Chart (2016)	Peak position
US Hot Christian Songs (Billboard)	1
US Christian Airplay (Billboard)	1
US Christian AC (Billboard)	1

== Certifications ==
Region	Certification	Certified units/sales
United States (RIAA)	Platinum	1,000,000^{‡}
^{‡} Sales+streaming figures based on certification alone.
