= Better Together (album) =

Studio album by Gaither Vocal Band
- Released: 2016
- Genre: Gospel

Gaither Vocal Band chronology
Happy Rhythm (2015)	Better Together (2016)

Better Together is an album by Gaither Vocal Band. It earned the group a Grammy Award nomination for Best Roots Gospel Album.

== Awards and accolades ==
On August 9, 2017, it was announced that Better Together would be nominated for a GMA Dove Award in the Southern Gospel Album of the Year category at the 48th Annual GMA Dove Awards.
