= Christmas Is Here (Danny Gokey album) =

Studio album by Danny Gokey
- Released: October 16, 2015
- Studio: Willowbrooke Studios (Franklin, Tennessee)
- Genre: Worship; CCM; pop rock; soul
- Length: 37:21
- Label: BMG
- Producer: Keith Thomas

Danny Gokey chronology
Hope in Front of Me (2014)	Christmas Is Here (2015)	La Esperanza Frente a Mi (2016)

Singles from Christmas Is Here
- 1. "Lift Up Your Eyes" Released: September 25, 2015

Christmas Is Here is the first Christmas album and third studio album recorded by Danny Gokey. BMG Records released the album on October 16, 2015. He worked with Keith Thomas, in the production of this album. An original track co-written by Gokey, "Lift Up Your Eyes", was released September 25, 2015 as the lead single. The album debuted at number one on the Billboard Top Holiday Albums chart and in the top 10 of the Christian and Independent albums charts.

== Critical reception ==
Professional ratings
Review scores
Source	Rating
365 Days of Inspiring Media	4/5 stars
CCM Magazine	3.5/5 stars
The Christian Beat	4/5 stars
New Release Today	4/5 stars

Rating the album three and a half stars for CCM Magazine, Kevin Sparkman says, "Christmas may be here, but Danny Gokey's vocals are always in season." Caitlin Lassiter, indicating in a four star review by New Release Today, describes, "Christmas Is Here is a perfect example of how to take classic favorites and remake them into modern songs of holiday praise and worship." Joshua Andre, awarding the album four stars at 365 Days of Inspiring Media, writes, "Well done Danny for such a poignant, powerful and prolific Christmas album". Giving the album four stars from The Christian Beat, Sarah Baylor states, "Danny Gokey's Christmas Is Here is definitely the perfect album to get you in the holiday spirit."

== Track listing ==
Christmas Is Here
No.	Title	Writer(s)	Length
1.	"What Christmas Means to Me"	Anna Gordy Gaye, George Gordy, Allen Story	3:21
2.	"It's the Most Wonderful Time of the Year"	Edward Pola, George Wyle	2:15
3.	"White Christmas"	Irving Berlin	2:57
4.	"Mary, Did You Know?"	Buddy Greene, Mark Lowry	4:49
5.	"Lift Up Your Eyes"	Mia Fieldes, Danny Gokey, Jonathan Smith	4:14
6.	"The Christmas Song"	Robert Wells, Mel Tormé	2:32
7.	"Christmas Is Here"	Gokey, Becca Mizell, Sam Mizell, Keith Thomas	3:15
8.	"This Christmas"	Donny Hathaway, Nadine McKinnor	3:28
9.	"O, Holy Night"	Traditional	4:56
10.	"Give Me Jesus"	Traditional	5:34
Total length:			37:21

== Personnel ==
- Danny Gokey – vocals
- Keith Thomas – keyboards, programming, acoustic piano, arrangements
- Pat Coil – acoustic piano
- Jonathan Crone – guitars
- Craig Nelson – bass
- Ben Phillips – drums
- Scott Williamson – drums
- Willowbrooke Philharmonic – orchestra
- Chris Harris – backing vocals
- Debi Selby – backing vocals
- Celica Westbrook – backing vocals

Choir

- Susan Bailey, Lindel Cooley, Marcia Daugherty, Michael Daugherty, Eric Droke, Rebecca Edwards, Joy Gardner, Rachelle Graber, Lisa Graham, Tammi Harris Cleek, Christina Metzger, Jeremy Pate, Terry White and Melanie Winters

=== Production ===
- Penny Railey – executive producer
- Mitchell Solarek – executive producer
- Keith Thomas – producer, engineer
- Jonathan Crone – engineer, mixing, assistant tracking engineer
- Dave McNair – mastering at Dave McNair Mastering (Winston-Salem, North Carolina)
- Daryl Bush – production coordinator
- Lisa Stuart – production coordinator
- Jeremy Cowart – photography
- Danny Gokey – liner notes

== Chart performance ==
Chart (2015)	Peak position
US Christian Albums (Billboard)	9
US Independent Albums (Billboard)	10
US Top Holiday Albums (Billboard)	1
