= My Best Days =

Studio album by Danny Gokey
- Released: March 2, 2010
- Recorded: 2009
- Studio: Starstruck Studios and Jane's Place (Nashville, Tennessee)
- Genre: Country
- Length: 38:34
- Label: RCA Nashville, 19
- Producer: Mark Bright

Danny Gokey chronology
My Best Days (2010)	Hope in Front of Me (2014)

Singles from My Best Days
- 1. "My Best Days Are Ahead of Me" Released: December 26, 2009; 2. "I Will Not Say Goodbye" Released: June 28, 2010

My Best Days is the debut studio album from American Idol season eight finalist Danny Gokey. The album was released on March 2, 2010, by RCA Records Nashville. The track "It's Only" was originally scheduled to be the first single, but it was withdrawn and replaced with "My Best Days Are Ahead of Me." Both it and the album's second single, "I Will Not Say Goodbye," have made Top 40 on Hot Country Songs.

== Critical reception ==
Professional ratings
Review scores
Source	Rating
Allmusic	2/5 stars
Entertainment Weekly	(B−)
Roughstock	3.5/5 stars

Matt Bjorke of Roughstock gave a positive review, saying that its sound recalled country pop and contemporary Christian music, but also saying that it, "sure feels like Danny Gokey has gotten himself a strong set of songs that find him in strong voice." Allmusic reviewer Stephen Thomas Erlewine gave the album two stars out of five, calling it "pristine adult contemporary pop, all soft and glittering." Brian Mansfield of USA Today gave it a positive review saying, "All in all, My Best Days continues in the vein of the three earlier albums from the four top finishers of Season 8, in that it plays exceptionally well to the strengths of the performers and the expectations their existing fans have for them."

Jessica Phillips of Country Weekly magazine gave three-and-a-half stars out of five, with her review saying, "it is refreshing to find a new artist with a solid message and genuineness to match." Deborah Evans Price of Billboard praised Gokey's vocal performance and said "Working with producer Mark Bright, Gokey crafted a contemporary country album that showcases his soulful vocals."

== Commercial performance ==
The album debuted at number four on the Billboard 200 for the chart week of March 9, 2010, selling 65,000 copies in its first week. My Best Days is the best debut for a male country solo artist since Billy Ray Cyrus' Some Gave All album debuted with 90,000 copies in June 1992. My Best Days sold 19,000 digital albums its first week, giving it the highest first week digital album sales ever for a new Country artist. As of December 29, 2010, the album has sold 201,000 copies in the U.S.

== Track listing ==
No.	Title	Writer(s)	Length
1.	"My Best Days Are Ahead of Me"	Marv Green, Kent Blazy	3:07
2.	"Like That's a Bad Thing"	Tony Martin, Neil Thrasher, Wendell Mobley	3:28
3.	"I Still Believe"	Kara DioGuardi, Busbee	4:06
4.	"Tiny Life"	Jeffrey Steele, Green	3:50
5.	"Get Away"	Ron Hemby, Billy Simon, Jimmie Lee Sloas	4:04
6.	"It's Only"	Dave Haywood, Charles Kelley, Tom Douglas	4:55
7.	"Life on Ya"	Steele, Tom Hambridge, Chuck Jones	3:15
8.	"Crazy Not To"	Green, Mobley, David Lee Murphy	3:55
9.	"Be Somebody"	Greg Barnhill, Joanna Cotten, Adam Hood	4:02
10.	"I Will Not Say Goodbye"	Chuck Cannon, Lari White, Vicky McGehee	3:52

iTunes Store pre-order
No.	Title	Length
11.	"The Coach"

== Personnel ==
Compiled from liner notes.

- Danny Gokey – vocals
- Charles Judge – keyboards, synthesizers, strings
- Gordon Mote – acoustic piano, keyboards, synthesizers
- Tom Bukovac – electric guitars
- Ilya Toshinsky – acoustic guitars, mandolin
- Mike Johnson – steel guitar
- Jimmie Lee Sloas – bass
- Chris McHugh – drums
- Eric Darken – percussion
- Aubrey Haynie – fiddle
- Jonathan Yudkin – fiddle
- Lisa Cochran – backing vocals

=== Production ===
- Lisa Ramsey-Perkins – A&R
- Mark Bright – producer
- Derek Bason – recording, mixing
- Todd Tidwell – additional recording
- Chris Ashburn – technical assistant
- Tristan Brock-Jones – technical assistant
- Nathan Dickinson – editing
- Hank Williams – mastering at MasterMix (Nashville, Tennessee)
- Mike "Frog" Griffith – production coordinator
- Kirsten Wines – production assistant
- Scott McDaniel – creative director
- Tracy Baskette-Fleaner – art direction
- Andrew Southam – photography
- Judy Forde-Blair – creative production, liner notes
- Tammie Harris Cleek – imaging production
- David K. – stylist
- Holly Chapman – grooming
- Mission Management and RLM – management

== Charts ==
=== Weekly charts ===
Weekly chart performance for My Best Days
Chart (2010)	Peak position
US Billboard 200	4
US Top Country Albums (Billboard)	3

=== Year end charts ===
2010 year-end chart performance for My Best Days
Chart (2010)	Peak position
US Top Country Albums (Billboard)	35
US Top Current Album Sales (Billboard)	185
