= More Than You Think I Am =

Single by Danny Gokey

from the album Hope in Front of Me
- Released: January 9, 2015
- Genre: Christian pop
- Length: 4:04
- Label: BMG-Chrysalis
- Songwriters: Danny Gokey; Bernie Herms; Tim Nichols
- Producer: Bernie Herms

Danny Gokey singles chronology
"Hope in Front of Me" (2014)	"More Than You Think I Am" (2015)	"Lift Up Your Eyes" (2015)

"More Than You Think I Am" is a song co-written and recorded by American contemporary Christian singer Danny Gokey for his second studio album, Hope in Front of Me (2014). Gokey wrote the song with Tim Nichols and the track's producer, Bernie Herms. It was released to American Christian radio in November 2014 and official impacted the format on January 9, 2015, through BMG-Chrysalis as the album's second single. The song experienced moderate success on the Billboard Christian charts.

== Composition ==
"More Than You Think I Am" is a Christian pop song with influences of Worship music, pop-leaning production, and a "propulsive" rock beat. According to the sheet music published by BMG Rights Management, it was originally composed in the key of B♭ minor and set in common time to an "steady" rock tempo of approximately 80 BPM. The song follows a chord progression of B♭m – G♭ – D♭ – A♭, while Gokey's vocal range on the track spans from the note of F_{4} through the note of D♭_{6}.

The song has been noted for its thematic contrast to previous single, "Hope in Front of Me", in that presents a more positive image of God and his "unconditional love." "More Than You Think I Am" is an anthem that reminds of the capacity of God to "forgive, heal, and help," and is voiced from the perspective of God himself as he implores his devoted to "Be still and trust my plan." Gokey has said that following the passing of his first wife, he "had a misconception of who God was to me during that time," but that instead of turning away from his faith, Gokey "ran to God asking Him to reveal Himself," which inspired the lyrics of the song.

== Commercial performance ==
"More Than You Think I Am" entered the Billboard Hot Christian Songs chart in December 2014 and reached a peak position of 17 on the chart dated May 9, 2015. The song reached numbers 8 and 21, respectively, on the format-specific Christian AC and Christian Hot AC/CHR airplay charts.

== Music video ==
No official music video was filmed for the song, but a lyric video was uploaded to Gokey's Vevo account on December 5, 2014.

== Charts ==
=== Weekly charts ===
Chart (2015)	Peak position
US Hot Christian Songs (Billboard)	17

=== Year end charts ===
Chart (2015)	Position
US Christian Airplay (Billboard)	16
US Christian AC (Billboard)	19
