= Hope in Front of Me (song) =

Single by Danny Gokey

from the album Hope in Front of Me
- Released: January 24, 2014
- Recorded: 2013–14 in Nashville, TN
- Genre: Christian pop; blue-eyed soul
- Length: 3:40
- Label: BMG
- Songwriters: Danny Gokey; Bernie Herms; Brett James
- Producer: Bernie Herms

Danny Gokey singles chronology
"Second Hand Heart" (2011)	"Hope in Front of Me" (2014)	"More Than You Think I Am" (2015)

Music video
- "Hope in Front of Me" on YouTube

"Hope in Front of Me" is a song co-written and recorded by American singer Danny Gokey for his second studio album of the same name (2014). Gokey wrote the song with Brett James and its producer, Bernie Herms. It was released to Christian radio on January 24, 2014 and to digital retailers February 18, 2014 through BMG Rights Management as the record's lead single. "Hope in Front of Me" serves as Gokey's debut release on the BMG label and his first single in almost three years.

Written as a message of hope in dark times, "Hope in Front of Me" features a more soulful sound than Gokey's previous releases and is his first to be marketed in the Christian genre. The song peaked at number four on the Billboard Christian Songs chart and number 27 on Adult Contemporary, marking his first entry on these charts.

== Background and recording ==
In 2009, Gokey rose to fame as the second runner-up on the eighth season of American reality singing competition American Idol. The following year, he released the country album, My Best Days, which reached the top 5 of the Billboard 200 and produced two top 40 singles on the Hot Country Songs chart. Gokey then announced in November 2011 that he had parted ways with his record label, RCA Records Nashville.

He signed a record/publishing deal with BMG Rights Management in May 2013 with the intention to shift his career toward a Christian crossover career. "I love country music and I still listen," Gokey told The Hollywood Reporter. "But I always felt my message of faith was important. Not much has changed, just my sound." He recorded new music in Nashville, Tennessee with producer Bernie Herms and released "Hope in Front of Me" to Christian radio on January 24, 2014.

== Composition ==
"Hope in Front of Me" is a Christian pop song with influences of blue-eyed soul, written by Danny Gokey, Bernie Herms, and Brett James. It was inspired by Gokey's journey dealing with the death of his first wife in 2008 and is about "finding purpose in your darkest moments." The song's chorus speaks to finding hope despite tragedy, with lines such as "There's better days still up ahead / Even after all I've seen, there's hope in front of me."

According to the sheet music published by BMG Rights Management, the song was originally composed in the key of C Minor and set in common time to a "moderate rock" beat of 76 BPM. The song follows a chord progression of Cm – A♭_{sus2} – E♭ – Gm7 and covers a vocal range of two octaves, from the note of C_{3} through C_{5}.

== Accolades ==
"Hope in Front of Me" was nominated for Song of the Year at the 2015 GMA Dove Awards, however it lost to "How Can It Be" by Lauren Daigle. The song's success also contributed to Gokey being nominated in the category of New Artist of the Year at the same ceremony.

== Chart performance ==
"Hope in Front of Me" debuted on the Billboard Hot Christian Songs chart dated March 8, 2014 and entered the top 20 in its seventh week on the chart dated May 24, 2014. The song reached a peak position of four on the chart dated August 16, 2014.

The song also experienced moderate pop crossover success. "Hope in Front of Me" debuted at number 29 on the Billboard Adult Contemporary chart dated July 26, 2014. It reached a peak position of 27 on the chart dated August 16, 2014 and spent a total of six weeks on the chart.

== Music video ==
An accompanying music video for the song was uploaded to Gokey's official YouTube channel on July 16, 2014 and "tells a story of redemption."

== Charts ==
=== Weekly charts ===
Chart (2014)	Peak position
US Adult Contemporary (Billboard)	27
US Hot Christian Songs (Billboard)	4

=== Year end charts ===
Chart (2014)	Position
US Christian Songs (Billboard)	8
US Christian Airplay (Billboard)	7
US Christian AC (Billboard)	8

== Release history ==
Country	Date	Format	Label	Ref.
United States	January 24, 2014	Christian radio	BMG	
Worldwide	February 18, 2014	Digital download	BMG	
