= Hope in Front of Me =

Studio album by Danny Gokey
- Released: June 23, 2014
- Studio: SoulFuel Studios and Brownstone Recording (Brentwood, Tennessee); Willowbrooke Studios and 300 Franklin Recording (Franklin, Tennessee)
- Genre: Blue-eyed soul, Christian pop
- Length: 41:47
- Label: BMG
- Producer: Josh Crosby; Bernie Herms; Aaron Sprinkle; Keith Thomas

Danny Gokey chronology
My Best Days (2010)	Hope in Front of Me (2014)	Christmas Is Here (2015)

Singles from Hope in Front of Me
- 1. "Hope in Front of Me" Released: January 24, 2014; 2. "More Than You Think I Am" Released: January 9, 2015; 3. "Tell Your Heart to Beat Again" Released: January 8, 2016

Hope in Front of Me is the second studio album from the Christian musician Danny Gokey. It was released on June 23, 2014, by BMG Records. The album was produced by Josh Crosby, Bernie Herms, Aaron Sprinkle, Keith Thomas.

The lead single from the album is "Hope in Front of Me", released on February 18, 2014. In August, it peaked at No. 4 on the Hot Christian Songs chart, No. 1 on the Christian Airplay chart (lasted 3 weeks) and No. 27 on the Adult Contemporary chart of Billboard. "More Than You Think I Am" and "Tell Your Heart to Beat Again" were subsequently released as singles, both placing in the top 20 on the Christian Songs chart and with the latter earning Gokey's highest chart peak to date (No. 2).

== Background ==
Gokey rose to national attention when he competed on American Idol, where he advanced to the final three before being eliminated. Shortly before competing, his wife died unexpectedly. After his Idol appearance, he released the country music album My Best Days. Hope In Front of Me, his second album, is his first one in the Christian music market. The album was produced by Josh Crosby, Bernie Herms, Aaron Sprinkle and Keith Thomas.

== Music and lyrics ==
Gokey co-wrote nine of the eleven songs and his lyric has been referred to as being akin to Phil Collins. The music is similar to the likes of Mark Schultz, Jonathan Thulin, Phil Stacey and Colton Dixon, and is in the vein of blue-eyed soul and dance-pop, with some elements of praise & worship. It also features "a country-pop sound that showcases his vocal range and tone".

== Singles ==
The lead single from the release is "Hope in Front of Me". On January 23, its official lyric video was released and the next day it was released to Christian radio airwaves. The single was available on digital retailers on February 18. As of the charting week of June 21, it charted on various Billboard Christian genre charts, including a Hot Christian Songs placement at No. 14. On June 24, its official music video was premiered during special live stream concert celebrating album release at Gokey's official website and right after released at Gokey's YouTube channel. In late August, it reached No. 1 on Billboard Christian Airplay chart. It also topped Billboard Christian AC Songs chart for the week ending of September 20.

The second single, "More Than You Think I Am" had its official lyric video released on December 5, and officially released to Christian radio airwaves on January 9, 2015. It peaked at No. 6 on the Billboard Christian Airplay chart in July.

"Tell Your Heart to Beat Again" was released on January 8, 2016, as the album's third and final single. An extended play featuring five versions of the song was released in May 2016. The song reached number 2 on the Hot Christian Songs, earning Gokey his highest-charting single to date, and was his second chart-topper on Christian Airplay.

== Critical reception ==
Professional ratings
Review scores
Source	Rating
365 Days of Inspiring Media	4/5 stars
Alpha Omega News	A−
CCM Magazine	4/5 stars
Christian Music Review	4.8/5
Cross Rhythms	8/10 squares
Jesus Wired	7.5/10 stars
New Release Tuesday	4.5/5 stars

Hope in Front of Me was met with a generally positive reception from critics. Grace S. Aspinwall of CCM Magazine rated the album four stars out of five, commenting how "Gokey shines on his second full-length album". At New Release Tuesday, Caitlin Elizabeth Lassiter rated the album four-and-a-half stars out of five, noting the lyricism for being "well written and thought provoking" and the vocals are "strong and impressive" on a "solid project" that's "a very enjoyable listen." Piet Levy of Milwaukee Journal Sentinel gave a moderately positive review of the album remarking how Gokey "does get sappy" and said while "if you wanted to be mean, you could call him 'Hokey Gokey' and you wouldn't exactly be off-base", yet "there's no denying Gokey's comfort level with this kind of material". Levy opined in reference to Gokey's previous, country-themed album that Gokey as a country artist was a concept destined to fail, "But five years later on 'Hope in Front of Me,' he's finally returning to the inspirational blue-eyed soul style that took him to third place. It's the album he should have made all along."

At Christian Music Review, Amanda Brogan rated the album a 4.8 out of five, indicating how the release "has a beautifully optimistic tone throughout." Rob Snyder of Alpha Omega News graded the album an A−, saying that "A couple of the tracks have an interesting retro-70s sound." At 365 Days of Inspiring Media, Jonathan Andre rated the album four out of five stars, calling it "a poignant, powerful and prolific album". Jessica Morris of Jesus Wired rated the album seven-and-a-half stars out of ten, highlighting how "the powerful vocalist delivers a solid and encouraging album in this highly anticipated release." Indicating in an eight out of ten review from Cross Rhythms, Tony Cummings recognizes, "Maybe Danny covers too many musical bases for some people's tastes but there's no doubting that he is a fine singer and possibly could even crossover to the pop scene with the right song." Felicia Abraham, reviewing the album at Charisma, writes, "Known for his soulful sound, Gokey pushes his vocal boundaries and collaborates with an impressive group of singers and producers [on Hope in Front of Me]".

== Track listing ==
No.	Title	Writer(s)	Length
1.	"Hope in Front of Me"	Danny Gokey, Bernie Herms, Brett James	3:37
2.	"More Than You Think I Am"	Gokey, Herms, Tim Nichols	4:04
3.	"Tell Your Heart to Beat Again"	Herms, Randy Phillips, Matthew West	3:53
4.	"Better Than Gold"	Gokey, Herms, Drew Ramsey	4:17
5.	"One Life"	Gokey, Marcus Hummon, Keith Thomas	3:36
6.	"This Is What It Means"	Gokey, Stephanie Lewis, Thomas	4:15
7.	"Love Will Take You Places"	Gokey, Blake Bollinger, Ben Stennis	3:36
8.	"Take It to the Limit"	Gokey, Josh Crosby, Aaron Sprinkle	3:44
9.	"Pretty Beautiful"	Ben Caver, Megan Connor, Brian White	3:07
10.	"Because of You"	Gokey, Jeff Pardo, Molly Reed	3:17
11.	"It's Not Over"	Gokey, Lewis, Thomas	4:21
Total length:			41:47

== Personnel ==
- Danny Gokey – vocals, backing vocals (1, 2, 4, 6, 9)
- Bernie Herms – keyboards (1–4, 7, 9), programming (2, 4, 9)
- Fred Williams – keyboards (1–3, 7, 9), programming (1–3, 7, 9)
- Keith Thomas – keyboards (5, 6, 10, 11), programming (5, 6, 10, 11), acoustic piano (10), bass (11)
- Josh Crosby – keyboards (8), drums (8)
- Aaron Sprinkle – keyboards (8), guitars (8), drums (8)
- Rob Nix – additional programming (8)
- Luke Fredrickson – guitars (1, 7), acoustic guitars (2), electric guitars (2, 9)
- Drew Ramsey – guitars (4)
- Jonathan Crone – guitars (5, 6, 10, 11), backing vocals (5)
- Jacob Lowrey – bass (4)
- Phil Moore – bass (8)
- Dan Needham – drums (4), percussion (4)
- Johnathan Lucas – drums (11)
- Byron "Mr. Talkbox" Chambers – talkbox (4)
- Luke Brown – backing vocals (2, 3, 7, 9)
- Celica Westbrook – backing vocals (5)
- Phil King – backing vocals (10)
- Jason Eskridge – backing vocals (11)
- Vicki Hampton – backing vocals (11)
- Wendy Moten – backing vocals (11)

== Production ==
- Richard Blackstone – executive producer
- Penny Railey – executive producer
- Mitchell Solarek – executive producer
- Bernie Herms – producer (1–4, 7, 9), recording (1–4, 7, 9)
- Keith Thomas – producer (5, 6, 10, 11), recording (5, 6, 10, 11)
- Josh Crosby – producer (8), mixing (8)
- Aaron Sprinkle – producer (8), engineer (8), mixing (8)
- Luke Fredrickson – mixing (1, 2)
- Sean Moffitt – mixing (3, 4, 7, 9)
- Dan Needham – recording (4)
- Jonathan Crone – recording (5, 6, 10, 11), mixing (5, 6, 10, 11)
- Andy Selby – editing (1–4, 7, 9)
- Dave McNair – mastering at Dave McNair Mastering (Winston-Salem, North Carolina)
- Ken Johnson – production coordinator (1–4, 7, 9)
- Penguin Creative – art direction, design
- Jeremy Cowart – photography
- Linnea Adams – wardrobe assistant
- Melanie Shelley – grooming
- Maximum Artist Management – management

== Chart performance ==
The album debuted at No. 1 on the Billboard Christian Albums chart, which makes this Gokey's first chart-topper. It also debuted at No. 40 on the Billboard 200. It sold 7,000 copies in the US in its debut week.

=== Weekly charts ===
Chart (2014)	Peak position
US Billboard 200	40
US Christian Albums (Billboard)	1
US Independent Albums (Billboard)	10

=== Year-end charts ===
Chart (2015)	Peak position
US Christian Albums (Billboard)	43
Chart (2016)	Peak position
US Christian Albums (Billboard)	25
US Independent Albums (Billboard)	31
