= Danny Gokey =

American singer

- Gokey in 2026

Background information
- Born: Daniel Jay Gokey; April 24, 1980 (age 46)
- Origin: Milwaukee, Wisconsin, U.S.
- Genres: Pop; CCM; blue-eyed soul
- Occupations: Singer; songwriter
- Works: Danny Gokey discography
- Years active: 2008–present
- Labels: 19 Recordings; RCA Records Nashville; BMG Rights Management; Red Street Records
- Spouses: Sophia Martinez (m. 2004; died 2008); Leyicet Peralta (m. 2012)
- Website: dannygokey.com

Daniel Jay Gokey (born April 24, 1980) is an American singer and former church music director. He was the third-place finalist on the eighth season of American Idol. After his placing on the show, Gokey signed to 19 Recordings and RCA Nashville at the beginning of a career in country music, releasing the single "My Best Days Are Ahead of Me." His debut album, My Best Days, was released in March 2010.

After leaving RCA Nashville in November 2011, he gravitated his music towards an adult pop/contemporary Christian sound and subsequently made a record deal with BMG Rights Management in May 2013. He released his second studio album, Hope in Front of Me, in 2014.

== Early life ==
Gokey started singing with his family in church, but stated he would rather record mainstream music than perform solely Christian/gospel music. He was the worship director at his church in Milwaukee, Faith Builders International Ministries, for several years.

He is the fifth of six children. He has a brother, Charles, and four sisters: Angela, Janell, Gina, and Tracey. Gokey has acknowledged the influence of Jeffrey and Robin Pruitt, who are the pastors of the church where he worked, and also Matthew Barnett, the founder of the LA Dream Center. He has stated that his faith is the "key to who I am". Gokey was a church music director, while also driving a semi truck for a local logistics company for two years.

== American Idol ==
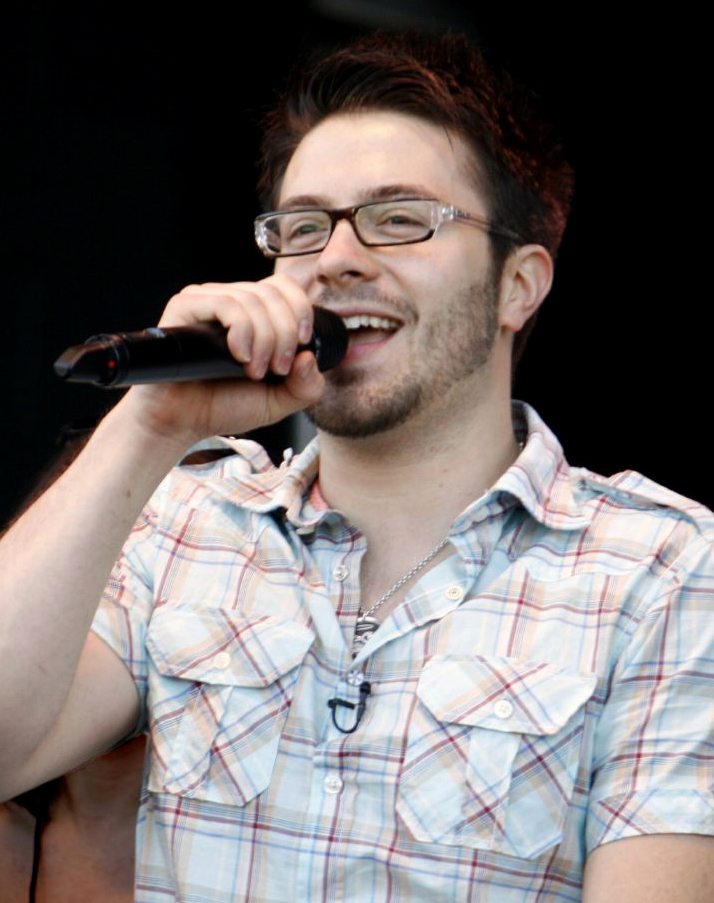
Gokey in his hometown of Milwaukee, Wisconsin in 2009

=== Overview ===
Gokey rose to national fame with his participation in the eighth season of American Idol. Gokey's American Idol audition occurred only four weeks after his wife's death in July 2008. He auditioned with his friend Jamar Rogers, who also made it through to Hollywood but was eliminated before the live shows.

During Rock Week (Top 4 week), Gokey's take on Aerosmith's "Dream On" was planned for the extended scream with which he finished the song. Gokey was the only contestant in that season who was never in the bottom two or three, but he was eliminated in third place on May 13, 2009, after his performance of Joe Cocker's "You Are So Beautiful".

During the season 8 finale on May 20, 2009, Gokey performed a duet with rhythm and blues singer-songwriter Lionel Richie. The performance opened with Gokey singing a true-to-the-original soulful ballad solo of Richie's "Hello," and then Richie joined Gokey for a duet of his hits "Just Go" and "All Night Long".

=== Performances ===
Theme week	Song sung	Artist
Audition	"I Heard It Through the Grapevine"	Marvin Gaye
Hollywood (part 1)	"Kiss from a Rose"	Seal
Hollywood (part 2)	"Somebody to Love"	Queen
Hollywood (part 3)	"I Hope You Dance"	Lee Ann Womack
Top 36; Billboard Hot 100 hits week	"Hero"	Mariah Carey
Top 13; Michael Jackson week	"P.Y.T. (Pretty Young Thing)"	Michael Jackson
Top 11; Grand Ole Opry week	"Jesus, Take the Wheel"	Carrie Underwood
Top 10; Motown week	"Get Ready"	The Temptations
Top 9 Top Downloads week	"What Hurts the Most"	Rascal Flatts
Top 8 Year They Were Born week	"Stand by Me"	Mickey Gilley
Top 7 Songs from the Cinema week (Note: Due to the judges using their one save to save Matt Giraud, the Top 7 remained intact for another week.)	"Endless Love" (from Endless Love)	Diana Ross and Lionel Richie
Top 7 Disco week	"September"	Earth, Wind & Fire
Top 5 Rat Pack Standards week	"Come Rain or Come Shine"	Frank Sinatra
Top 4 Rock and roll week; duet and solo (Note: It was only announced that Allison Iraheta received the lowest number of votes this week. The other member(s) of the bottom two or three were never revealed.)	"Renegade" (with Kris Allen) "Dream On"	Styx; Aerosmith
Top 3 Judge's Choice (Paula Abdul) and Contestant's Choice week	"Dance Little Sister" "You Are So Beautiful"	Terence Trent D'Arby; Billy Preston

== Post-Idol career ==
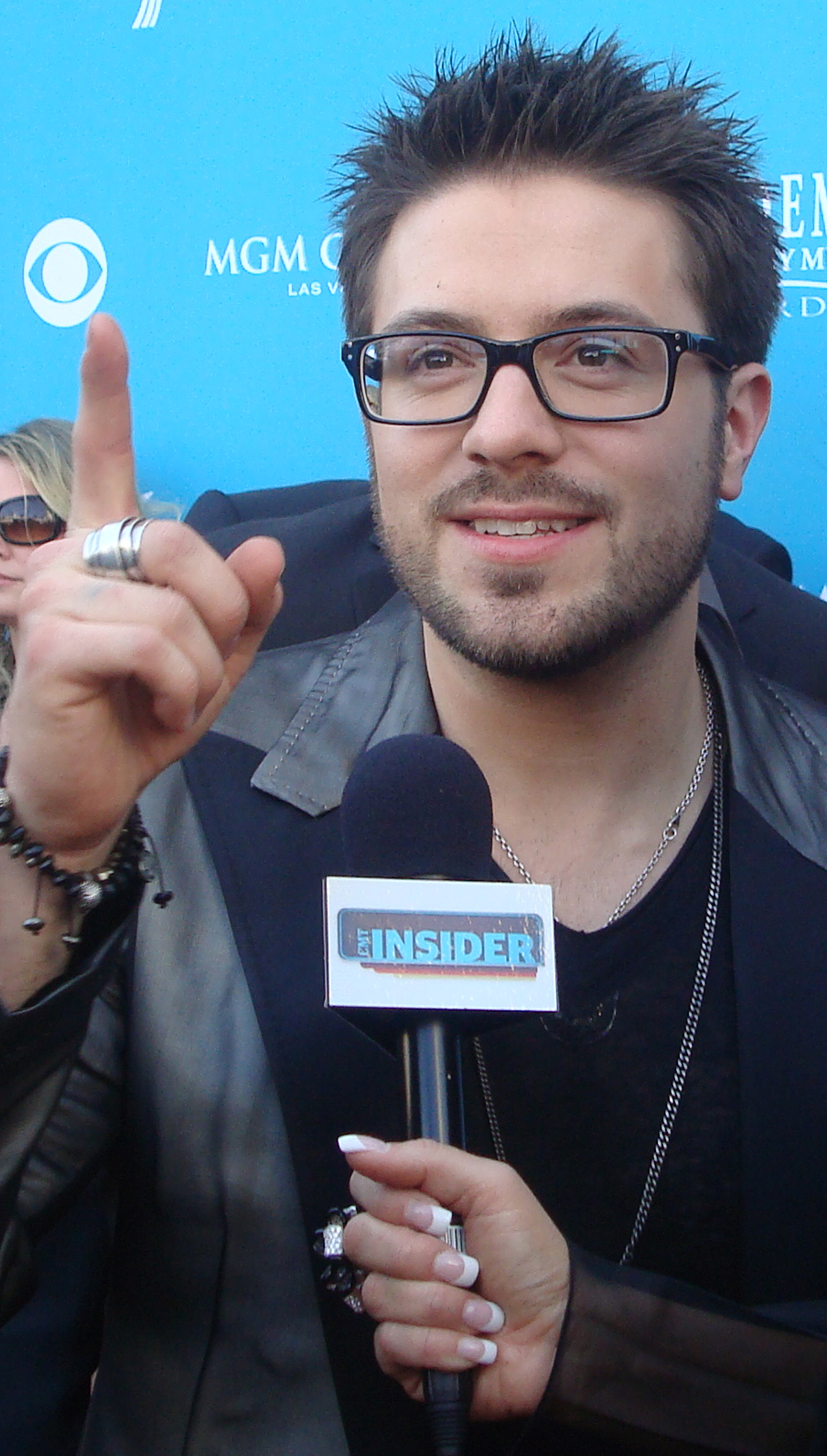
Gokey in April 2010

Gokey was nominated in his home state of Wisconsin in the WAMI (Wisconsin Area Music Industry) Awards for Best Christian/Gospel Artist of the Year. In September 2009, Gokey finished his tour with the other idols on the American Idols Live! Tour 2009, and he worked on his foundation, Sophia's Heart Foundation, which was set up to help disadvantaged children.

Gokey, known for his many pairs of eyeglasses that he often wore on the show, had stated he might start an eyewear line to help raise funds for his foundation and Match Eyewear teamed with him for the Danny Gokey Eyewear collection. Launched in March 2012, the collection has exceeded sales projections with over 1.7 million in net retail sales.

=== 2009–2010: My Best Days ===
On September 1, 2009, Gokey signed with 19 Recordings/RCA Nashville, becoming the first third-place finisher to record with 19 and the first male Idol to be signed to a major country label. On November 19, 2009, 19 Recordings and RCA Records announced the release of the debut single "My Best Days Are Ahead of Me". He released his debut album, My Best Days, on March 2, 2010. It debuted on the Billboard charts at number four, and it netted him the best opening-week sales by a debut country male in 18 years and the highest debut of digital downloads sold by any new country artist ever. In support of the album, Gokey was the opening act on Sugarland's Incredible Machine tour which began in April. He also performed at country singer Darryl Worley's ninth annual Tennessee River Run festival in Savannah, Tennessee along with other artists such as Joe Diffie and Lee Brice. The event helped raise $200,000 for the Darryl Worley Foundation.

On October 18, 2010, Gokey earned a nomination for Best New/Breakthrough Artist at the first annual American Country Awards. On November 21, 2010, Gokey was a part of ABC's pre-show event at the American Music Awards.

=== 2011–2018: Label change and Hope in Front of Me ===
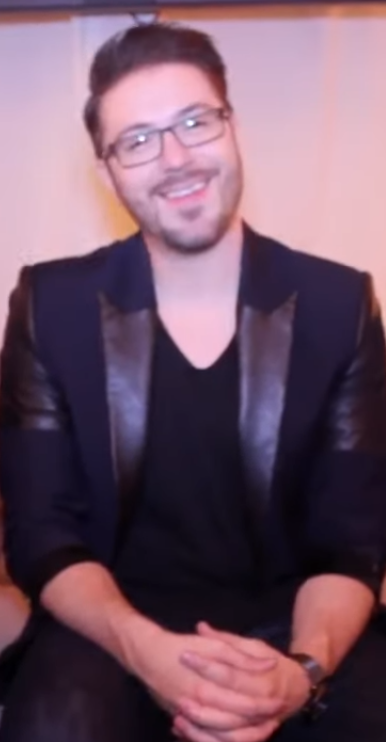
Gokey at an interview in 2014

Gokey released the single "Second Hand Heart", written by Cary Barlowe, Shane Stevens and Josh Kear, in 2011. He was one of opening acts on Taylor Swift's Speak Now World Tour. He also made an appearance in a TV movie with Candace Cameron Bure called Truth Be Told. Subsequently, he left RCA Nashville in November of the same year. In 2012, he released his EP, Love Again. It was self-released limitedly via his official website only as physical CD format. His memoir, Hope in Front of Me: Find Purpose in Your Darkest Moments, was published on October 1, 2013.

In 2014, Gokey released "Hope in Front of Me" as a single, under the record label BMG Rights Management. Subsequently, his second studio album, Hope in Front of Me, was released. The album debuted at number one on the Billboard Christian Albums chart. In late August, "Hope in Front of Me" topped both the Christian Airplay chart (lasted 3 weeks) and Mediabase Christian Adult Contemporary chart. For the week ending of September 20, it also topped the Christian AC Songs chart. "Hope in Front of Me" was nominated for Song of the Year at K-LOVE Fan Awards 2015, held on May 31, and one of award-winning songs at 2015 BMI Christian Awards, held on June 23. In July, "More Than You Think I Am" peaked at number 6 on the Christian Airplay chart. In August, Gokey earned nominations for New Artist of the Year and Song of the Year for "Hope in Front of Me" at 46th GMA Dove Awards.

In the spring of 2015, Gokey joined Natalie Grant's Burn Bright Tour as a special guest, followed by The Bible Tour 2015 with Steven Curtis Chapman, Brandon Heath and Francesca Battistelli. In September of the same year, Gokey released the lead single "Lift Up Your Eyes" from his holiday album, Christmas Is Here, which was released on October 16. In October, Gokey joined NewSong's Beating Hearts Tour with Mandisa. In December, Gokey joined the 2015 K-LOVE Christmas Tour as a special guest.

In 2017, his fifth studio album, Rise, was released. The album performed well commercially on the charts and on the success for some of its songs. It received multiple award nominations, including in the 60th Annual Grammy Awards.

=== 2019–present: Haven't Seen It Yet and Jesus People ===
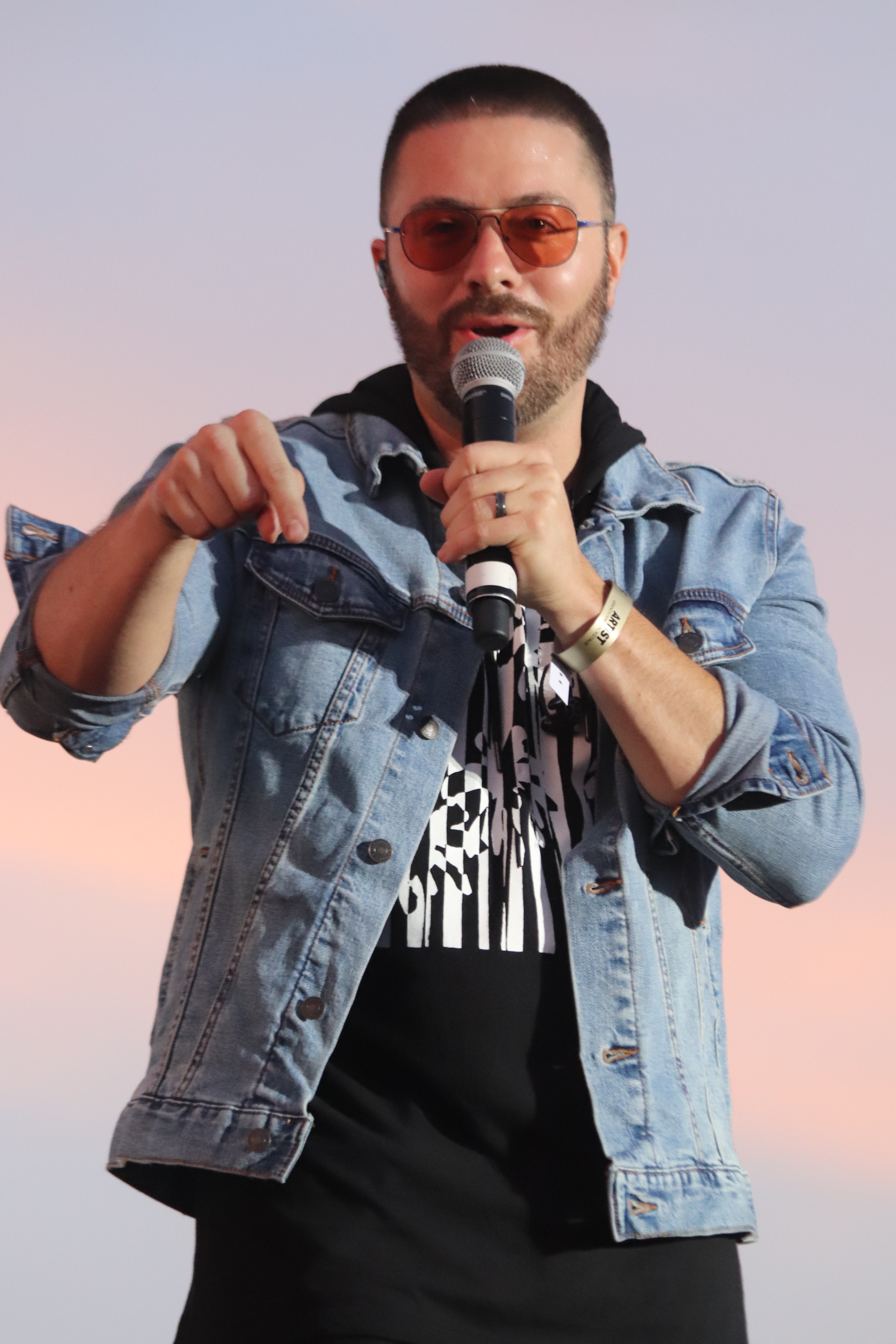
Gokey performing at Lifest in 2019

Gokey released "Haven't Seen It Yet" as a single, which has been a huge commercial success, peaking at the top three on the Billboard Christian charts and at number four in Cross Rhythms. His sixth album, Haven't Seen It Yet, was released on April 19, 2019. The album peaked at number two on the Billboard Top Christian Albums chart and number one at Christian Airplay chart. The releases were nominated for two categories at the 62nd Annual Grammy Awards and the song was the winner of a Dove Award for Short Form Music Video of the Year. He also released radio and Spanish versions of some of the songs on the album in 2020.

Gokey's eighth album, Jesus People, was released on August 20, 2021, in which he experimented with singing with various genres, such as Latin pop, classical music and dance-pop. The album peaked at number one on the Billboard Top Christian Albums chart and at number 99 on the Billboard 200 chart. The album consists of five singles that achieved commercial success, which were "We All Need Jesus", "Stand in Faith", "He Believes in You", "Agradecido" and "Do for Love". In August, he released the "Stand in Faith" and "Do for Love" music videos. He also embarked on many concert tours and appeared in Stand Together Tour with Mac Powell and Newsboys. Subsequently, he released "Live Up to Your Name" and his second EP, Brave, where he expresses his patriotic feeling for the United States from a religious perspective.

In 2025, it was announced that Gokey had signed to Red Street Records.

In 2026, he voiced Blake Drake, a country-singing duck, in Butch Hartman's animated series, The Garden Cartoon.

== Personal life ==
Gokey is a Christian. He married his high school sweetheart, Sophia Martinez, on May 15, 2004. The two had been together since 1997.

On July 9, 2008, four weeks before he auditioned for American Idol, Gokey's wife died from complications during her third surgery to treat her congenital heart disease. The couple had been together for 12 years, and Gokey credited her for his success. Sophia was a fan of American Idol and encouraged Gokey to be a contestant, and Danny started a foundation in her name, Sophia's Heart Foundation, with some of her family members who are also musicians. With branches in Milwaukee, Nashville, and Sacramento, the organization's goals are to provide hope and help to homeless families, provide scholarships to deserving students and operate a thriving inner-city music and arts program.

In 2011, Gokey began dating Leyicet Peralta. The two announced their engagement on December 25, 2011, on the Sophia's Heart website. They were married on January 29, 2012. On their thirteenth anniversary, Gokey revealed they were actually wed on November 30, 2011, before going on a private honeymoon. Their son was born on January 20, 2013. Their daughter was born on November 28, 2014. Their second son was born on August 29, 2017. On August 16, 2019, their fourth child was born on the birthday of Gokey's first wife.

=== Politics ===
Gokey was raised in a Republican household and has publicly supported Republican politicians since 2012. He supported Donald Trump during his first impeachment trial and in the 2020 presidential election. In January 2022, Gokey appeared at the event announcing Doug Mastriano's entry into the Pennsylvania gubernatorial race.

Gokey, who is not vaccinated against COVID-19, has stated that he believes the vaccine may be part of a prophecy in the Book of Revelation that "emphasizes how the whole world will be deceived by Pharmakeia." He also believes that vaccine mandates could lead to the Mark of the Beast, an end-times belief about the Antichrist espoused by many evangelical Christians.

== Awards and nominations ==
Award	Year (Note: Indicates the year of ceremony. Each year is linked to the article about the awards held that year, wherever possible.)	Nominee/work	Category	Result	Ref.
American Country Awards	2010	Gokey	Breakout Artist of the Year	Nominated	
BMI Christian Awards	2015	"Hope in Front of Me"	Award Winning Songs	Won	
BMI Christian Awards	2016	"More Than You Think I Am"	Award Winning Songs	Won	
BMI Christian Awards	2018	"Rise"	Award Winning Songs	Won	
BMI Christian Awards	2019	"The Comeback"	Award Winning Songs	Won	
BMI Christian Awards	2020	"Haven't Seen It Yet"	Award Winning Songs	Won	
GMA Dove Awards	2015	"Hope in Front of Me"	Song of the Year	Nominated	
GMA Dove Awards	2015	Gokey	New Artist of the Year	Nominated	
GMA Dove Awards	2016	Gokey	Contemporary Christian Artist of the Year	Nominated	
GMA Dove Awards	2016	"Tell Your Heart to Beat Again"	Pop/Contemporary Song of the Year	Nominated	
GMA Dove Awards	2016	Christmas Is Here	Christmas/Special Event Album of the Year	Won	
GMA Dove Awards	2016	"Tell Your Heart to Beat Again"	Short Form Music Video of the Year	Nominated	
GMA Dove Awards	2017	Gokey	Contemporary Christian Artist of the Year	Nominated	
GMA Dove Awards	2017	Rise	Pop/Contemporary Album of the Year	Nominated	
GMA Dove Awards	2019	"Haven't Seen It Yet"	Short Form Music Video of the Year	Won	
GMA Dove Awards	2020	The Greatest Gift: A Christmas Collection	Christmas/Special Event Album of the Year	Nominated	
GMA Dove Awards	2020	"Wanted"	Short Form Music Video of the Year	Nominated	
Grammy Awards	2018	Rise	Best Contemporary Christian Music Album	Nominated	
Grammy Awards	2020	"Haven't Seen It Yet"	Best Contemporary Christian Music Performance/Song	Nominated	
Grammy Awards	2020	Haven't Seen It Yet	Best Contemporary Christian Music Album	Nominated	
K-LOVE Fan Awards	2015	"Hope in Front of Me"	Song of the Year	Nominated	
K-LOVE Fan Awards	2016	Gokey	Male Artist of the Year	Won	
K-LOVE Fan Awards	2016	"Tell Your Heart to Beat Again"	Breakout Single	Won	
K-LOVE Fan Awards	2016	"Tell Your Heart to Beat Again"	Best Lyric	Nominated	
K-LOVE Fan Awards	2017	Gokey	Male Artist of the Year	Won	
K-LOVE Fan Awards	2017	Gokey	Artist of the Year	Nominated	
K-LOVE Fan Awards	2018	Gokey	Male Artist of the Year	Nominated	
K-LOVE Fan Awards	2019	Gokey	Male Artist of the Year	Won	
K-LOVE Fan Awards	2021	Gokey	Male Artist of the Year	Nominated	
K-LOVE Fan Awards	2022	Gokey	Male Artist of the Year	Nominated	
Wisconsin Area Music Industry (WAMI)	2010	Gokey	Artist of the Year	Nominated	
Wisconsin Area Music Industry (WAMI)	2010	Gokey	Male Vocalist of the Year	Nominated	
Wisconsin Area Music Industry (WAMI)	2010	Gokey	Best Christian/Gospel Artist of the Year	Nominated	

== Discography ==
- My Best Days (2010)
- Hope in Front of Me (2014)
- Christmas Is Here (2015)
- La Esperanza Frente a Mi (2016)
- Rise (2017)
- Haven't Seen It Yet (2019)
- The Greatest Gift: A Christmas Collection (2019)
- Jesus People (2021)
- Sound of Heaven (2024)

== See also ==
- American Idol (season 8)
