= Cardec Drums =

Puerto Rican musician and music producer

- Also known as: Cardec
- Origin: Puerto Rico
- Genres: Reggaeton, hip hop
- Occupations: Musician, producer
- Years active: 2008-present
- Label: No Apologies Music

Jacob Cardec, artistically known as Cardec Drums, is a Puerto Rican drummer, music producer and songwriter, specializing in Christian urban music (hip hop, trap and reggaeton) who has worked with artists from Reach Records, Reflection Music Group and Funkytown Music. He has received various awards for his work with KB, Lecrae, Redimi2, Almighty and Andy Mineo.

== Career ==
Cardec studied music at the Atlanta Institute of Music. Upon graduation, he was featured as a touring drummer for artists like Alex Faith, Dominic Balli, Andy Mineo and more. In 2012, Cardec Drums got their chance to work for Social Club Misfits with their single "New Years". The following year, he continued to thrive as a producer by winning Lecrae's "I Know" remix contest.

After stepping away from touring, he has continued to produce for notable artists such as Andy Mineo, Lecrae, Derek Minor, Tedashii, KB, Xavier Omär, and ELHAE. In 2018, his participation in KB's Today We Rebel album earned him joint honors with his first Dove Award for Hip Hop Album of the Year. At one time, he used a particular auditory signature of a female voice saying "push your hands in the air for Cardec".

In 2019, he co-founded the independent record label No Apologies Music, with a mission to connect American hip-hop and Latin-based urban music. This led to the signing of the first artist, Tommy Royale.

Cardec has produced for Latin artists such as Funky, Manny Montes, Gabriel Rodríguez EMC, Eliud L'Voices, and the award-winning production with Latin American artists such as Redimi2 and Almighty in Filipenses 1:6, Urban Christian Song of the Year at the Tu Música Urbano Awards, later considered again as Spanish Language Recorded Song of the Year, this time, at the 2020 Dove Awards, where it was only nominated.

In 2020, the desire to merge the two music markets produced an alliance between Reach Records and their No Apologies label, they merged with 116 Clique for the release of the Sin Vergüenza album, where artists such as Funky, Manny Montes, Lecrae, Lizzy Parra, Social Club, among others, creating the desired union that Cardec pursued in the mission of his label. He has continued to produce for artists such as Jaydan, Tommy Royale and Don Ryvcko.

On March 14, 2022, 1K Phew and Cardec launched a project that paid homage to the Nickelodeon and Disney shows/movies they grew up with. Months later, they released a second part with samples dealing with Power Rangers, Arthur, Frozen, Reading Rainbow and Encanto.

== Discography ==
=== Studio albums ===
- 2018: Hopetober 2 (with Eliud L'Voices)
- 2020: Sin Vergüenza (with his label and Reach Records)
- 2022: Phew Skylark (with 1K Phew)
- 2022: Phew Skylark 2 (with 1K Phew)

== Credits ==
| Year | Title | Artist (s) | Details | Ref. |
|---|---|---|---|---|
| 2014 | 100 EP | KB | «Crazy» | |
| 2014 | Loose Canon V2 | Canon | «Point of view» | |
| 2016 | Reflection | Derek Minor | | |
| 2017 | Today We Rebel | KB | 2018 Dove Award for "Hip Hop Album of the Year". | |
| 2018 | Summer Eighteen | 116 Clique | «Long Live Champion» by KB, Yariel & Gabriel Rodríguez EMC | |
| 2019 | Summer Nineteen | 116 Clique | «Hold Me Back Latin», Reggaeton Remix with Niko Eme, Tommy Royale, Eliud L'Voices & Gabriel Rodríguez EMC | |
| 2019 | «La Praxis (Reggaeton Edition)» | Tommy Royale | | |
| 2019 | MOOD // DOOM | Social Club | 2021 Dove Award for "Hip Hop Album of the Year". | |
| 2019 | Mi Moda | Ander Bock | «No fallará», «A romperla» | |
| 2020 | 20/20 | Redimi2 | Song "Filipenses 1:6" from this album, was recognized as Urban Song of the Year at the 2020 Tu Música Urbana Awards and nominated for Spanish Language Recorded Song of the Year at the 2020 Dove Awards. | |
| 2021 | «En La Mía» | Almighty | | |
| 2021 | «Una vez» | Don Ryvcko | | |
| 2021 | «El Nuevo David» | Tommy Royale | | |
| 2021 | El Disco | Jaydan | «Moda», «Moda (Remix)» with Jay Kalyl & Lizzy Parra | |
| 2021 | Solo Reggaeton | Manny Montes | Almost the whole album | |
| 2021 | Momentum | Redimi2 | «Momentum», «El Incorregible», «Manifiesto», «Buena Onda» | |
| 2022 | We Are Unashamed | 116 | «Pa que sepa» with Tommy Royale, Brayan Booz, Don Ryvcko & Emmanuel Lara | |
| 2022 | Genelipsis | Almighty | «Idónea» with Jay Kalyl | |
| 2022 | Dosis | Indiomar & Musiko | «No disparo» | |
| 2022 | Rompiendo | Redimi2 | «Rompiendo», «Kings And Queens» with Ada Betsabé, Tomi Perfetti, Indy For, Léxico HT, Mr. Yeison, Desxa, Fanny Plaza, CH Gedeones, H-Sufia & Eva Nova, «Me Corre» with Vianca "The Grace", Borrero & Pauneto | |
| 2022 | King Jesus Pt. 2 Remix | KB | With Big Breeze, Scootie Wop, 1K Phew, Mike Teezy, Limoblaze, Wande, Tommy Royale, & S.O. | |
