= ¿Quién contra nosotros? =

Studio album by Alex Zurdo
- Released: August 17, 2018
- Recorded: 2017–2018
- Genre: Christian music; latin pop
- Length: 1:18:57
- Label: AZ Music
- Producer: Xerran, Alex Zurdo

Alex Zurdo chronology
AZ Live (2016)	¿Quién contra nosotros? (2018)	M.E.M.E. (2020)

¿Quién contra nosotros? (in English, Who against us?) is the tenth album by Christian rapper Alex Zurdo, released on August 17, 2018, by his label AZ Music. It had the participation of Redimi2, Funky, Melvin Ayala, Marcos Witt, René González, Manny Montes, Gabriel Rodríguez EMC, Indiomar, GaVriel, Jaime Barceló, Natán El Profeta, Kike Pavón and the duo Antonio & Joel. The songs were produced mostly by Xerran, Ito and Alex Zurdo himself.

The album was nominated at the 2019 Latin Grammy Awards in the category "Best Christian Album in Spanish", also, it obtained at the Dove Awards in 2018 the recognition of "Song of the Year in Spanish" for the single «Sin ti», while in 2019, this production was awarded as "Album of the Year in Spanish" and the song «Mi GPS» was nominated for song in Spanish of the year. Also, this album was awarded "Best Urban Album" at the ARPA Awards 2019.

== Background ==
Prior to the release of the album, the singles "Lo Mío No Pasa" became known since the end of 2016, a single that won an AMCL Award in 2017 for Urban Song of the Year, «Una nueva canción» ("A New Song") with Kike Pavón, «Lo Mío No Pasa» (salsa version) with Antonio & Joel, «Sin ti», «No cuenten conmigo», «Volveré» (I'll be back) with Jaime Barceló (previously, Jaime de León) and «Mi GPS» (this song appeared on the Billboard page).

The album was released on August 17, 2018, after its publication, three additional songs ¿Quién contra nosotros? (in English, Who against us?) were promoted, «Todo lo puedo» ("All I Can") in collaboration with Funky and «Cambiaste mi corazón» ("You changed my heart") together with their official videos. For the song "La Pasajera" with Indiomar and Gabriel Rodríguez EMC, a video of lyrics released on February 28, 2019, was handled.

=== Music videos ===
Año	Título	Productor(s)
2016	«Lo mío no pasa»	Xerran
2017	«Una nueva canción» (con Kike Pavón)	Xerran
2017	«Sin ti»	Xerran y Emy Luziano
2018	«Volveré» (con Jaime Barceló)	Xerran
2018	«Mi GPS»	Xerran
2018	«¿Quién contra nosotros?»	Xerran
2018	«Todo lo puedo» (con Funky)	Xerran; Ito Martis; Funky; Alex Zurdo
2018	«Cambiaste mi corazón»	Xerran

== Tracklist ==
1. ¿Quién Contra Nosotros? - Alex Zurdo
2. No Cuenten Conmigo - Alex Zurdo
3. Cambiaste Mi Corazón - Alex Zurdo
4. Cuando Se Acaba La Nota - Alex Zurdo feat. Redimi2
5. Todo Lo Puedo - Alex Zurdo feat. Funky
6. Mi GPS - Alex Zurdo
7. No Hay Pero Va a Sobrar - Alex Zurdo feat. Marcos Witt
8. Mi Refugio - Alex Zurdo feat. Manny Montes, Melvin Ayala & GaVriel
9. Mira Mis Ojos - Alex Zurdo feat. Natán El Profeta
10. Nada Me Falta - Alex Zurdo
11. Volveré - Alex Zurdo feat. Jaime Barceló
12. Pa'que Oren - Alex Zurdo
13. La Pasajera - Alex Zurdo feat. Indiomar, Gabriel Rodríguez EMC
14. Tiempo = Amor - Alex Zurdo feat. René González
15. No Busques Culpables - Alex Zurdo
16. La Vida Vana - Alex Zurdo
17. Sin Ti - Alex Zurdo
18. Una Nueva Canción - Alex Zurdo feat. Kike Pavón
19. Lo Mío No Pasa
20. Lo Mío No Pasa (Salsa Remix) - Alex Zurdo feat. Antonio & Joel

== Awards and nominations ==
Year	Award	Category	Work nominated	Result
2018	Dove Award	Song of the Year in Spanish	«Sin ti»	Won
2019	Latin Grammy	Christian album in Spanish	Quién contra nosotros	Nominated
2019	Dove Award	Song of the Year in Spanish	«Mi GPS»	Nominated
2019	Dove Award	Christian album in Spanish	Quién contra nosotros	Won
2019	Arpa Awards	Best Urban Album	Quién contra nosotros	Won
