= 2023 Premios Tu Música Urbano =

- Date: June 15, 2023
- Venue: José Miguel Agrelot Coliseum, San Juan, Puerto Rico
- Country: United States
- Most wins: Karol G (6)
- Most nominations: Rauw Alejandro (12)
- Website: Official website

Television/radio coverage
- Network: Telemundo; Telemundo Internacional; YouTube

The 4th Annual Premios Tu Música Urbano were held on June 15, 2023, at the José Miguel Agrelot Coliseum in San Juan, Puerto Rico, to recognize the best in urban music. The ceremony was broadcast by Telemundo and Telemundo Internacional, as well as streamed on YouTube.

The nominations were announced on May 2, 2023. Puerto Rican singer Rauw Alejandro led the nominations with twelve, followed by Feid with eleven, Bad Bunny with ten and Karol G with nine. Colombian singer Karol G received the most awards with six, including Artist of the Year.

== Winners and nominees ==
The nominees were announced on May 2, 2023.

Artist of the Year	Top Artist — Duo or Group
Karol G; Bad Bunny; Rauw Alejandro; Ozuna; Rosalía	Wisin & Yandel; Jowell & Randy; Piso 21; Zion & Lennox; Alexis y Fido; CNCO; Mau y Ricky
Top Artist — Male	Top Artist — Female
Feid; Jhayco; Anuel AA; Yandel; Manuel Turizo; Maluma; Arcángel; Farruko	Becky G; Anitta; María Becerra; Nicki Nicole; Tini; Natti Natasha; Cazzu
Top New Artist — Male	Top New Artist — Female
Cris MJ; Omar Courtz; Alejo; Polimá Westcoast; Hozwal; Chris Lebrón; Chris Palace; Yng Lvcas; Jossef; Brray	Elena Rose; Paopao; Villano Antillano; Itzza Primera; Ingratax; Snow Tha Product; Catalyna; Nesi
Top Rising Star — Male	Top Rising Star — Female
Eladio Carrión; Duki; Ryan Castro; Tiago PZK; Lyanno; Álvaro Díaz; Kevin Roldán; Quevedo	Young Miko; Bad Gyal; Emilia; Tokischa
Song of the Year	Song of the Year — Duo or Group
"Provenza" – Karol G; "Quevedo: Bzrp Music Sessions, Vol. 52" – Bizarrap and Quevedo; "Feliz Cumpleaños Ferxxo" – Feid; "Lokera" – Rauw Alejandro, Lyanno and Brray; "Despechá" – Rosalía; "La Bachata" – Manuel Turizo; "Me Porto Bonito" – Bad Bunny featuring Chencho Corleone	"Besos Moja2" – Wisin & Yandel and Rosalía; "Los Cachos" – Piso 21 and Manuel Turizo; "Si Te Pillo" – Jowell & Randy and Wisin & Yandel; "Berlín" – Zion & Lennox and María Becerra; "Plutón" – CNCO and Kenia Os; "Miami" – Mau y Ricky
Collaboration of the Year	Remix of the Year
"Yandel 150" – Yandel and Feid; "Punto 40" – Rauw Alejandro and Baby Rasta; "La Jumpa" – Arcángel and Bad Bunny; "La Inocente" – Mora, Feid; "TQG" – Karol G and Shakira; "La Corriente" – Bad Bunny featuring Tony Dize; "Hey Mor" – Ozuna and Feid; "En La De Ella" – Jhayco, Feid and Sech; "Party" – Bad Bunny and Rauw Alejandro	"La Bebe (Remix)" – Yng Lvcas and Peso Pluma; "Loco por Perrearte (Remix)" – De La Ghetto featuring Rauw Alejandro; "Marisola (Remix)" – Cris MJ, Duki, Nicki Nicole, Standly, Stars Music Chile; "Ultra Solo (Remix)" – Polimá Westcoast, Feid, Pailita, Paloma Mami and De La Ghetto; "Desde Mis Ojos (Remix)” – Chris Lebrón, Sech and Jay Wheeler; "Si La Calle Llama (Remix)" – Eladio Carrión featuring Myke Towers; "Después de las 12 (Remix)" – Ovi and Kim Loaiza featuring Grupo Firme and Pailita
Top Artist — Pop Urban	Top Artist — Tropical Urban
Jay Wheeler; Manuel Turizo; Rosalía; Pedro Capó; Tini; Becky G; Danny Ocean; Shakira	Romeo Santos; Rafa Pabón; Gente de Zona; Prince Royce; Pirulo y la Tribu
Top Artist — Regional Mexican Urban	Top Artist — Dembow
Eslabon Armado; Natanael Cano; Peso Pluma; Grupo Firme; Grupo Frontera; Santa Fe Klan; Junior H; Fuerza Regida	El Alfa; Kiko el Crazy; Rochy RD; Tokischa; Chimbala; Ángel Dior
Top Artist — Trap	Top Artist — Christian-Spiritual
Anuel AA; Eladio Carrión; Bryant Myers; Hozwal; Young Miko; Yovngchimi; Duki; Dei V	Farruko; Funky; Alex Zurdo; Redimi2; Gabriel EMC; Indiomar; Onell Díaz
Top Song — Pop Urban	Top Song — Tropical Urban
"X Si Volvemos" – Karol G and Romeo Santos; "Te Felicito" – Shakira and Rauw Alejandro; "Ojitos Lindos" – Bad Bunny and Bomba Estéreo; "Playa del Inglés" – Quevedo and Myke Towers; "Shakira: Bzrp Music Sessions, Vol. 53" – Bizarrap and Shakira; "LLYLM" – Rosalía; "Cairo" – Karol G and Ovy On The Drums; "La Triple T" – Tini; "Traductor" – Tiago PZK and Myke Towers	"Si Te Preguntan..." – Prince Royce, Nicky Jam and Jay Wheeler; "La Fórmula" – Maluma and Marc Anthony; "Agüita de Coco" – Rafa Pabón; "Desnúdate" – Zion & Lennox; "Arranca" – Becky G featuring Omega; "Lotería" – Luis Vázquez, Rafa Pabón; "Baila Bien" – Vf7, Nio García
Top Song — Trap	Top Song — Dembow
"El Nene" – Anuel AA and Foreign Teck; "Diamantes En Mis Dientes" – Anuel AA and Yovngchimi; "JS4E" – Arcángel; "Mbappé" – Eladio Carrión; "Lisa" – Young Miko; "Givenchy" – Duki; "Coco Chanel" – Eladio Carrión featuring Bad Bunny; "Big Booty" – Hozwal, Young Miko and Lil Geniuz	"Ojos Ferrari" – Karol G, Justin Quiles and Ángel Dior; "Feliz" – Chimbala; "Tití Me Preguntó" – Bad Bunny; "Gogo Dance" – El Alfa and Chael Produciendo; "Delincuente" – Tokischa, Anuel AA and Ñengo Flow; "Piropi" – Ángel Dior; "Tamo en Nota" – Rauw Alejandro and Ángel Dior; "Chukiteo" – Kiko el Crazy and Ñengo Flow; "To' Esto Es Tuyo" – Natti Natasha
Top Song — Christian-Spiritual	Concert/Tour of the Year
"Nazareno" – Farruko; "Nubes" – Indiomar and Blanca; "100 x 35" – Redimi2, Alex Zurdo, Christian Ponce, Gabriel EMC, Borrero and Joeky Santana; "Sigo Aquí" – Gabriel EMC and Redimi2; "Tuyo (Remix)" – Omy Alka, Indiomar and Musiko; "A Ciegas (Remix)" – Indiomar, Musiko, Alex Zurdo and Funky; "Tu Manto (Remix)" – Funky, Odanis BSK and Lizzy Parra; "En La Mia (Remix)" – MC Albertico, Isaias Francotirador and Farruko	$trip Love Tour – Karol G; World's Hottest Tour – Bad Bunny; Saturno World Tour – Rauw Alejandro; La Última Misión World Tour – Wisin & Yandel; La Última Vuelta World Tour – Daddy Yankee; Ozutochi World Tour – Ozuna; Motomami World Tour – Rosalía
Album of the Year – Male Artist	Album of the Year – Female Artist
Feliz Cumpleaños Ferxxo Te Pirateamos el Álbum – Feid; Un Verano Sin Ti – Bad Bunny; La Última Misión – Wisin & Yandel; OzuTochi – Ozuna; Paraíso – Mora; Saturno – Rauw Alejandro; Sr. Santos – Arcángel; LLNM2 – Anuel AA; Resistencia – Yandel	Mañana Será Bonito – Karol G; La Nena de Argentina – María Becerra; Cupido – Tini; Versions of Me – Anitta; Esquemas – Becky G; Nena Trampa – Cazzu; Motomami – Rosalía
Album of the Year – New Artist	The Best Comeback
Sen2 Kbrn VOL. 2 – Eladio Carrión; Portales – Tiago PZK; Tú Crees en Mí? – Emilia; Temporada de Reggaetón 2 – Duki; Reggaetonea – Ryan Castro; Donde Quiero Estar – Quevedo; El Cambio – Lyanno	Vico C; Maldy; Tony Dize; Baby Rasta; Don Omar; Ivy Queen
Top Music Producer	Composer of the Year
Bizarrap; Los Legendarios; Tainy; Mr. NaisGai; Ovy on the Drums; Caleb Callloway; MAG; Súbelo Neo; Dimelo Ninow & Dulce Como Candy	Rauw Alejandro; Justin Quiles; Keityn; Jhayco; Edgar Barrera; MAG; La Paciencia; Feid; Rios
Top Social Artist	Video of the Year
Rauw Alejandro; Feid; Mau y Ricky; Manuel Turizo; Rosalía; Jay Wheeler; Tini	"JS4E" – Arcángel; "Punto 40 Año 2077" – Rauw Alejandro and Baby Rasta; "La Llevo al Cielo" – Chencho Corleone, Chris Jedi, Anuel AA, Ñengo Flow; "TQG" – Karol G and Skakira; "La Reina" – Maluma; "Bombón" – Daddy Yankee, El Alfa and Lil Jon; "Chorrito Pa Las Animas" – Feid; "La Loto" – Tini, Becky G and Anitta; "Riri" – Young Miko
