= 2022 Premios Tu Música Urbano =

- Promotional poster
- Date: June 23, 2022
- Venue: José Miguel Agrelot Coliseum
- Country: United States
- Hosted by: Zuleyka Rivera; Omar Chaparro; Carmen Villalobos
- Most wins: Karol G (9)
- Most nominations: Bad Bunny (11)

Television/radio coverage
- Network: Telemundo
- Viewership: 1.06 million

The 3rd Annual Premios Tu Música Urbano were held on June 23, 2022, at the José Miguel Agrelot Coliseum in San Juan, Puerto Rico, recognizing artists who "transcended and boosted the success of Latin urban music around the world". Zuleyka Rivera, Omar Chaparro and Carmen Villalobos hosted the ceremony. Karol G received the Artist of the Year award, and was also the most awarded artist of the night with nine wins.

== Performances ==
2022 Premios Tu Música Urbano performers
Artist(s)	Song(s)	Ref.
Farruko DJ Adoni Akim	Performance Medley "Guerrero" "Nazareno" "Luz"	
Sofía Reyes and María Becerra	"Marte"	
Lunay	Performance Medley "Bandida" "Soltera"	
Zion & Lennox	Performance Medley "Yo Voy" "Otra Vez" "Pierdo La Cabeza""	
Blessd and Lenny Tavárez	"Medallo"	
Christian Nodal VF7	Performance Medley "Botella Tras Botella" "Pensar en Ti"	
Chesca and Nio Garcia	"Tu2Ru"	
CNCO	"No Apagues La Luz"	
Víctor Manuelle and Miky Woodz	"Vamo’ a Ver Si el Gas Pela"	
Jay Wheeler	Performance Medley "La Curiosidad" "Eazt"	
María Becerra	"Ojalá"	
Piso 21 and Christian Nodal	"Pa' Olvidarme De Ella"	
Nio Garcia Casper Mágico	Performance Medley "AM" "Te Boté"	
Feid	"Porfa"	
Sech	"Borracho"	
Kimberly Loaiza Lele Pons	Performance Medley "Ya No Somos" "Piketona"	
Alex Zurdo Indiomar Amara Rodes	"A Pesar de Mí"	
Natanael Cano	"NataAoki"	
N’Klabe El Gemelo Funk Salsa Urban	"The Salsa Remix"	

== Winners and nominees ==
The nominees were announced on May 12, 2022. Winners are listed first and highlighted in bold.

Artist of the Year	Top Artist — Duo or Group
**Karol G**; Bad Bunny; Farruko; J Balvin; Maluma; Rauw Alejandro; Sebastián Yatra	**CNCO**; Jowell & Randy; Mau y Ricky; Piso 21; Wisin & Yandel; Zion & Lennox
Top Artist — Male	Top Artist — Female
**Daddy Yankee**; Anuel AA; Don Omar; JhayCo; Nicky Jam; Ozuna; Residente; Sech; Wisin	**Becky G**; Anitta; Farina; Ivy Queen; Natti Natasha; Paloma Mami; Rosalía
Top New Artist — Male	Top New Artist — Female
**Lit Killah**; Álvaro Díaz; Beéle; Blessd; Duki; Eix; Khea; Ryan Castro; Tiago PZK	**Kimberly Loaiza**; Bad Gyal; Chesca; Corina Smith; Emilia; La Ross María; Ptazeta; VF7
Top Rising Star — Male	Top Rising Star — Female
**Feid**; Dalex; Jay Wheeler; Justin Quiles; Lenny Tavárez; Lunay; Manuel Turizo; Mora; Myke Towers; Nio Garcia	**María Becerra**; Aitana; Lola ĺndigo; Mariah Angeliq; Nathy Peluso; Nicki Nicole; Sofía Reyes; Tini
Song of the Year	Song of the Year — Duo or Group
**J Balvin and María Becerra – "Qué más pues?"**; Anitta – "Envolver"; Bad Bunny — "Yonaguni"; Farruko – "Pepas"; J Balvin and Skrillex – "In da Getto"; Rauw Alejandro – "Todo de Ti"; Sebastián Yatra and Myke Towers – "Pareja del Año"	**CNCO – "Toa la Noche"**; Gigolo y La Exce and Jay Wheeler — "Chantaje"; Mau y Ricky and María Becerra – "Mal Acostumbrao"; Wisin, Camilo, and Los Legendarios – "Buenos Días"; Wisin and Los Legendarios – "Playita"; Wisin & Yandel – "Recordar"
Top Social Artist	Remix of the Year
**Karol G**; Anitta; Anuel AA; Bad Bunny; Camilo; J Balvin; Lele Pons; Ozuna; Residente	**J Balvin, Karol G, and Nicky Jam featuring Crissin, Totoy El Frío, and Natan & Shander – "Poblado Remix"**; Boza, Lunay, Lenny Tavárez, Juhn, and Beéle — "Ella Remix"; Marc Segui featuring Rauw Alejandro and Pol Granch — "Tiroteo Remix"; Mora, Bad Bunny, and Sech — "Volando Remix"; Nio Garcia, J Balvin, and Bad Bunny — "AM Remix"; Sech, Daddy Yankee, and J Balvin — "Sal y Perrea Remix"; Sech and JhayCo — "911 Remix"; Wisin, JhayCo, and Anuel AA featuring Myke Towers and Los Legendarios — "Fiel Remix"
Collaboration of the Year	Top Latin Crossover Song
**Becky G and Karol G — "Mamiii"**; Aventura and Bad Bunny – "Volví"; Blessd, Justin Quiles, and Lenny Tavárez — "Medallo"; J Balvin and Sech – "Una Nota"; Natti Natasha and Becky G – "Ram Pam Pam"; Rauw Alejandro and Chencho Corleone – "Desesperados"; Tainy, Bad Bunny, and Julieta Venegas – "Lo siento BB"; Tini and María Becerra – "Miénteme"	Tiësto and Karol G – "Don’t Be Shy"; Camila Cabello, Myke Towers and Tainy – "Oh Na Na"; Camilo and Shawn Mendes – "Kesi Remix"; DJ Snake, Ozuna, Megan Thee Stallion and Lisa – "SG; Rosalía featuring The Weeknd – "La Fama"; Rvssian, Rauw Alejandro and Chris Brown – "Nostálgico"; J Balvin and Ed Sheeran – Sigue
Top Artist — Pop Urban	Top Artist — Tropical Urban
**Anitta**; Camilo; Jay Wheeler; Maluma; Manuel Turizo; Rosalía; Sebastián Yatra	**Aventura**; El Alfa; Gente de Zona; Guaynaa; N’Klabe; Prince Royce
Top Artist — Regional Mexican Urban	Top Artist — Dembow
**Christian Nodal**; Eslabon Armado; Gera MX; Grupo Firme; Ivan Cornejo; Junior H; Natanael Cano; Ovi	**El Alfa**; Amenazzy; Chimbala; Kiko El Crazy; Rochy RD; Tokischa
Top Artist — Trap	Top Artist — Christian-Spiritual
**Myke Towers**; Anuel AA; Bryant Myers; Dowba Montana; Eladio Carrión; JhayCo; Jon Z; Luar La L; Miky Woodz	**Alex Zurdo**; Almighty; Funky; Lizzy Parra; Redimi2
Top Song — Pop Urban	Top Song — Tropical Urban
**Daddy Yankee featuring Bad Bunny – "X Última Vez"**; Jay Wheeler – "Eazt"; JhayCo and Anuel AA – "Ley Seca"; Maluma – "Sobrio"; Manuel Turizo – "Te Olvido"; Ozuna – "Deprimida"; Reik and Maluma – "Perfecta"; Sebastián Yatra – "Tacones Rojos"	**Becky G and El Alfa – "Fulanito"**; N’Klabe — "Devuélveme"; Justin Quiles, Chimbala, and Zion & Lennox – "Loco"; Ryan Castro – "Mujeriego"; Olga Tañón and Nacho – "Ojalá Remix"; Peter Nieto and Ivy Queen – "Pa' Mí"; Don Omar and Nio Garcia – "Se Menea"; Ozuna and Anthony Santos – "Señor Juez"; Nio Garcia, Casper Mágico, Ozuna, Myke Towers, Wisin & Yandel, and Flow La Movie – "Travesuras remix"; Víctor Manuelle featuring Miky Woodz and Marvin Santiago – "Vamo’ a Ver Si el Gas Pela"
Top Song — Regional Mexican	Top Song — Dembow
**Gera MX and Christian Nodal – "Botella Tras Botella"**; Grupo Firme and Maluma – "Cada Quien"; Ivan Cornejo – "Está Dañada"; Lenny Tavárez, Natanael Cano, and Ovi – "Enfermo de Riqueza"; Natanael Cano featuring Oscar Maydon – "Porte Exuberante"; Ovi, Natanael Cano, Junior H, and Herencia de Patrones – "Los 4 Ases (Corrido Tumbado)"; Polo González – "Sencillo Soy"	**El Alfa, CJ, Chael Produciendo, and El Cherry Scom – "La Mamá De La Mamá"**; El Alfa, Braulio Fogon, and Chael Produciendo – "El Tontoron Tonton"; El Alfa, Farruko, and Chael Produciendo – "Curazao"; Maffio, Darell, and Don Miguelo – "Elma Maria"; Tokischa and Rosalía – "Linda"; Rochy RD and Anuel AA – "Los Iluminaty"; Darell and El Alfa – "Pakata"; Chimbala and Omega – "Se Me Nota (Agárrame)"
Top Song — Trap	Top Song — Christian-Spiritual
**Eladio Carrión and Karol G – "No Te Deseo El Mal"**; Anuel AA and Chris Jedi – "Los De Siempre"; Bad Bunny and Luar La L – "100 Millones"; Bizarrap and Eladio Carrión – "Eladio Carrión: Bzrp Music Sessions, Vol.40"; Foreign Teck, Justin Quiles, and Jay Wheeler featuring Bryan Myers, Eladio Carrión, and Tory Lanez – "Conexión"; Myke Towers – "Mírenme Ahora"; Ozuna – "G Wagon"	**Pedro Capó and Farruko – "Gracias Remix"**; Alex Zurdo, Funky, and Redimi2 featuring Un Corazón, Indiomar, Abby Valdez – "A Pesar de Mí"; Alex Zurdo, Funky, and Redimi2 – "Mira lo que hizo Dios"; Almighty and Redimi2 – "Dios Es Primero"; Onell Díaz and Farruko – "Incompleto"
Album of the Year – Male Artist	Album of the Year – Female Artist
**Daddy Yankee – Legendaddy**; Anuel AA – Las Leyendas Nunca Mueren; Farruko – La 167; J Balvin – Jose; Jay Wheeler – De Mí Para Ti; Jhayco – Timelezz; Rauw Alejandro – Vice Versa; Sech – 42	**Karol G - KG0516**; María Becerra – Animal; Natti Natasha – Nattividad; Nicki Nicole – Parte de Mí; Paloma Mami – Sueños de Dalí; Rosalía – Motomami
Album of the Year – New Artist	Video of the Year
**Feid – Inter Shibuya – La Mafia**; Blessd – Hecho en Medellín; Boza – Bucle; Brray – Err Bambini; Dalex – Unisex; Duki – Temporada de Reggaetón; Kevvo – Cotidiano; Lenny Tavárez – Krack Deluxe; Mora – Microdosis	**Karol G and Mariah Angeliq – "El Makinon"**; Anuel AA – "McGregor"; Bad Bunny — "Yonaguni"; Daddy Yankee featuring Rauw Alejandro and Nile Rodgers – "Agua"; Don Omar and Nio Garcia – "Se Menea"; Natti Natasha and Becky G – "Ram Pam Pam"; Ozuna – "La Funka"; Rauw Alejandro – "Todo de Ti"; Rosalía featuring The Weeknd – "La Fama"
Video of the Year – New Artist	Top Music Producer
**Tiago PZK, Lit Killah, and María Becerra featuring Nicki Nicole – "Entre Nosotros Remix"**; Blessd, Justin Quiles, and Lenny Tavárez — "Medallo"; Emilia and Duki – "Como Si No Importara"; Marc Segui featuring Rauw Alejandro and Pol Granch — "Tiroteo Remix"; María Becerra featuring Becky G – "Wow Wow"; Sofía Reyes and María Becerra – "Marte"; Tini and María Becerra – "Miénteme"	**Bizarrap**; Caleb Calloway; Foreign Teck; Los Legendarios; Mr. NaisGai; Ninow y Candy; Ovy on the Drums; Tainy
Composer of the Year	Concert/Tour of the Year
**Bad Bunny**; Elena Rose; Justin Quiles; Mora; Ovy on the Drums; Rafa Pabón; Rauw Alejandro	**Karol G (Bichota Tour)**
Dedication Special Award	Contribution Special Award
**Farruko**	**Víctor Manuelle**
