= Melvin Ayala =

Puerto Rican singer

- Born: Melvin Ayala Rodríguez; September 21, 1985 (age 40); San Juan, Puerto Rico
- Occupations: Singer; rapper; songwriter
- Years active: 2010–present
- Spouse: Naydimar Ortiz
- Relatives: Daddy Yankee
- Musical career
- Genres: Reggaeton; Christian hip hop; trap; dancehall
- Instrument: Vocals
- Labels: Tu Siervo Records; Third Day Music; Revival Music

Melvin Ayala Rodríguez (September 21, 1985, Santurce, Puerto Rico), is a Puerto Rican singer and songwriter of urban and Christian music. He is also known for being the brother of Raymond Luis Ayala Rodríguez formally known as Daddy Yankee.

== Musical career ==
Melvin Ayala made his musical debut in 2008 with his first production entitled "Vivir por fe" (Live by faith), which featured the participation of Freedom, Samuel Hernández, Carlos Manuel and Manny Montes, from which the single "Mi Barrio" came out.

His second production entitled The Story Before Becoming a Hero in 2009, featured the participation of Q Killa, Jaime Barceló, Isaac & Shalom and Dr. P, from which the single "Tonight" came out with Dr. P.

The third production entitled "La Diferencia" in 2011, from which singles such as "Sangre" (Blood) with Daniel Calveti and "Estilo Inexplicable" ("Inexplicable Style").

Also the fourth production entitled "Love HD" in 2014, with the participation of Samuel Hernández, Marcos and Montana, from which singles came out such as: "Amor De Júbilo", produced by DJ Blaster. He also released a single entitled "Sube Tu Bandera" and the remixed version by "Amor De Júbilo" with Manny Montes and Alex Zurdo.

Then he released a single titled: "Dánzale", "Que Bonito es", and "Que no faltes Tú", produced by Wisin's producers, Los Legendarios in 2015, singles from his album "Flaming Fire", which featured El Bima, brother of rapper Mexicano 777, Mr. Q and Marcos X.

In 2019, he released "Rompe El Techo", which was later remixed with Jay Kalyl, Lizzy Parra, Villanova, Jaydan and Manny Montes in 2020.

The last singles released by Ayala are "Cantares", and "Los Lobos".

== Discography ==
Álbumes de estudio

- 2008: Vivir por Fe
- 2009: The Story Before Becoming A Hero
- 2011: La differencia
- 2012 : vivir por fe
- 2014: Love HD
- 2017: Flaming Fire
- 2022: Tu Siervo Pa
