= Musiko =

Puerto Rican singer (born 1990)

- Also known as: Musiko
- Born: Billy Pérez; December 11, 1990 (age 35)
- Origin: Puerto Rico
- Genres: Latin Christian; reggaeton; Christian hip hop
- Years active: 2007–present
- Labels: Quest Music; Kingdom First

Billy Pérez (born December 11, 1990), known artistically as Musiko, is a Puerto Rican singer, songwriter and record producer. In his discography, there are two studio albums and two collaborative ones, these being 7 together with Triple Seven and Dosis together with Indiomar.

He debuted in 2007 as a singer, where he has received multiple nominations at the Águila Awards, El Galardón and El Galardón Internacional, Praise Music Awards, Tu Música Urbano, among others. Since 2011, he began as director of music videos for Kingdom 1st Films, Managing to win four categories in the VMCL Awards, specialized in audiovisual works.

== Musical career ==
Musiko's debut as a singer is in Vision Quest (2007), rapper Quest's second album, in the song "Esperando en ti". In the same year at Expolit, he participated with Quest in a concert with Manny Montes, Alex Zurdo, Triple Seven and Redimi2, performing songs from the album A Fuego Con La Palabra by Dr. P, published by CanZion and the American Bible Society.

At that time, he participated in Travy Joe albums such as Guerreros del Reino and Palabra Viva, and also started in the field of directing music videos with the production company Kingdom 1st Films since 2011.

Musiko's debut album titled Esperando en Ti would arrive in 2012 along with the music video for the single "Mi Tesoro". This production had the participation of Triple Seven, Quest, Manny Montes and Anna Cano. In 2013, he joined Triple Seven to make a collaborative album titled 7, where Musiko also performed solo songs, and directed the video clips for the singles "Enamorado" and "Ayer". The album and some singles were nominated in different categories of the 2013 AMCL Awards, obtaining the award as "Urban Album of the Year". At the 2015 VMCL Awards, he received three awards for his audiovisual works for Alex Zurdo and El Novato.

In 2016, he collaborated with Funky and produced the official video for "Cicatriz" for their album Indestructible. He also released three singles with video clips: "Ya No Soy Igual", "Sin Tu Amor" with Alex Zurdo and "Todo Empezó", again with Funky, these two audiovisual works being the most important in Musiko's career, surpassing both 75 million views on YouTube. The following year, his album Anexo would arrive, released in November 2017.

In 2019, he released other singles such as "Creo", "Suficiente" and his remix with Lizzy Parra, Omy Alka and Jay Kalyl. At the end of the year, she sang again with Funky in the song "Confía" from the album Agua, a song nominated for the Tu Música Urbano Awards for "Urban Christian Song". Later, at the beginning of the COVID-19 pandemic, she participated in the song distributed by CanZion entitled "Tu paz", along with Lead, Madiel Lara, Un Corazón, Cash Luna, among other artists. He would also be invited by KB to participate in collaboration with Blanca Callahan for the Spanish version of her single "Yes Song", this time titled as "Si cancion".

In 2022, he released his collaborative album Dosis with Puerto Rican Christian singer Indiomar, performing a verse on the single "No disparo" (in English, "No shot"). The album would be nominated in the Best Urban Album category at the 2022 Arpa Awards.

On 2023, Musiko has presented his most recent musical project, which bears his birth name, Billy.

== Discography ==
=== Studio albums ===
- 2012: Esperando en ti
- 2013: 7 (with Triple Seven)
- 2017: Anexo
- 2022: Dosis (with Indiomar)
- 2023: Billy

== Awards ==
- 2013: AMCL Awards - Urban Album of the Year for 7 with Triple Seven
- 2022: Arpa Awards - Best urban album for Dosis with Indiomar (Nominated)
- 2022: GMA Dove Awards - Spanish Language Recording Song of the Year for "A ciegas" with Indiomar (Nominated)
- 2023: Premios Tu Música Urbano - Top Canción Cristiana (two nominations)
