= Rubinsky RBK =

Dominican Christian music rapper

- Also known as: Rubinsky RBK
- Born: Manuel Enrique Núñez Espinoza; May 9, 1990 (age 36); Santo Domingo, Dominican Republic
- Genre: Christian hip-hop/Latin rap
- Occupations: Rapper; singer; songwriter
- Instrument: Vocals

Manuel Enrique Núñez Espino, musically known as Rubinsky RBK, is a Dominican Christian music rapper from Santo Domingo.

He has collaborated with artist such as Redimi2, Lizzy Parra, Manny Montes, Dkano and others. He gained fame with the song “Trapstorno” with Redimi2, Natan El Profeta and Philippe, which gained 100 million views on YouTube.

He is considered one of the most promising artists of Christian Latin rap. Some of his most successful songs are: "Sigo aquí", "Amor y Pasión", "Na" and "Te Necesito".

== Career ==
Its official beginnings date back to 2009 with the song "Feliz", a significant theme of the artist. At a very early age he was part of a group called "Eternal Promise" along with other young people who continue to work with Rubinsky today. Between 2010 and 2011, he participated in more than 5 videos and more than 10 collaborations, one of them, "El Concilio", organized by the Puerto Rican artist Maso El Presidente and his label Un-Sin Records. In that year, Rubinsky was part of the event where the rapper The Ambassador, a pioneer of Christian Urban music in the United States, visited the Dominican Republic for the first time.

In 2012, he released his first album called “Desde El Inicio” which contains 14 songs. This was backed by the Un-Sin label. On March 11, 2013, he released his first EP titled “El Demo”. The album containing 6 songs, among them "Por cada aplauso", "Quieren" and "Deja Vu". In 2014, this work led him to win the Best Urban Album award at the El Galardon Awards ceremony that year. In 2013, he joined Lara, Exo2, Atalaya and Sep7imo from Ejército de Sion as the group called Real.7 with their first proposal “RADICAL THE MIXTAPE”.

"Escrito en Reserva", the artist's third production, was released on April 14. It had the collaboration of Adams Onel, Aposento Alto, Redimi2, Melissa Capellán, Jeiby, among others.

On March 27, 2018 Redimi2 released the single "Trapstorno", a song in which Rubinsky RBK had the opportunity to participate with Natan el Profeta and Philippe. The single was hugely successful and made Rubinsky internationally recognized. His third album, "Mejor que ayer" (in English, "Better than yesterday"), was released on August 13, 2018. It featured the participation of Grace, Uptimo, Indiomar, Ammi Alba and Jaydel.

On February 19, 2019, he released the official video for "La Praxis (freestyle)", a theme that became a challenge, thanks to the fact that the original theme of Redimi2, went viral, and caused many singers to release their own versions. Rubinsky's official video turned out to be one of the most successful versions, as it managed to exceed a million views in a short time. In that year, he participated in rapper Phillippe's musical Espíritu Libre.

On March 23, 2020, he launched his fourth production, with the name: “Y Conoceréis La Verdad”. It featured the participation of Gran Rah, Infante, Shalondy Yireth, Niko Eme and Lucy Pelegrin. That same year, he released the song 911, in which he collaborates with Jotta A and Daniela Araújo.

In 2022, Rbk presents his new single 'Canciones Eternas', from his album "Conocí Una Oveja".

== Discography ==
=== Studio albums ===
- 2012: Desde el inicio
- 2015: Escrito en reserva
- 2018: Mejor que ayer
- 2020: Y conoceréis la verdad
- 2022: Conocí una oveja

=== EP's albums ===
- 2013: El Demo
- 2017: 2 en 1

== Awards and nominations ==
- 2014: El Galardón Awards: Best Urban Album by El Demo
- 2017: El Galardón Awards: Urban Artist of the Year
