= 13 Letters (album) =

Studio album by 116 Clique
- Released: July 7, 2007
- Genre: Christian hip hop
- Label: Reach
- Producer: Tony Stone, Numinus, NAB

116 Clique chronology
The Compilation Album (2005)	13 Letters (2007)	Amped (2007)

13 Letters is the second compilation album by the Christian hip hop group 116 Clique. It charted at No. 29 on the Billboard Christian Albums chart, and No. 10 on the Billboard Gospel Albums chart.

The name is based on the number of the Apostle Paul's epistles.

== Track listing ==
No.	Title	Performing Artist(s)	Length
1.	"Begin with the End"	Lecrae	2:37
2.	"Dig In"	Trip Lee featuring Tedashii	4:41
3.	"Gospel Music" (Romans)	Shai Linne	4:50
4.	"Break it Down" (1 Corinthians)	Lecrae	4:12
5.	"This is my Heart" (2 Corinthians)	Sho Baraka	4:33
6.	"Justified" (Galatians)	Sho Baraka	4:32
7.	"My City" (Ephesians)	FLAME	4:13
8.	"To Live is Christ" (Philippians)	Trip Lee	4:55
9.	"Let No Man" (Colossians)	Json	4:16
10.	"Keep the Faith" (1 Thessalonians)	Tedashii featuring Diamone	6:16
11.	"Stand Strong" (2 Thessalonians)	Tedashii	4:19
12.	"Instructions" (1 Timothy)	1-Lyfe featuring Lecrae	4:21
13.	"It's Yours" (2 Timothy)	Lecrae featuring Rick Trotter	4:02
14.	"Sound" (Titus)	Trip Lee	3:59
15.	"Take Em Back" (Philemon)	Dillon Chase	3:32
16.	"Get Loose"	Trip Lee featuring Lecrae	3:26
17.	"Evolution"	Sho Baraka	3:34
18.	"Carry Mine"	Tedashii	4:06
