= Reset (Funky album) =

Studio album by Luis "Funky" Marrero
- Released: January 25, 2011
- Recorded: 2009–2011
- Genres: Latin; Christian; Contemporary Christian music
- Length: 58:32
- Labels: Funkytown Music; Quest Music Studio; Ear Candy Studios
- Producers: Luis "Funky" Marrero; Angel "Chuelo" Vazquez Obed “El Arquitecto”

Luis "Funky" Marrero chronology
Aceso Total Tour Edition (2008)	Reset (2011)

Singles from Reset
- 1. "Hoy" Released: August 2010; 2. "Corazones Puro" Released: September 2010; 3. "Justo a Tiempo" Released: February 2011

Reset is the ninth studio album by Latin Christian artist Luis "Funky" Marrero, released January 2011 on Funkytown Music.

== Background ==
On a musical hiatus, Funky had many songs that were not released or songs that could have been tweaked. So he finally decided to put these all on one album, while he also recorded new material for the album.

== Songs ==
"Hoy" & "Corazones Puro" were the first two songs to come out of the album as singles, but when they were finally released, they came out with a new mix and a new sound.

== Track listing ==
No.	Title	Writer(s)	Length
1.	"Hoy"	L. Marrero, L. Lozada	3:43
2.	"No Te Cambio (Featuring Quest)"	L. Marrero, O. Méndez	3:48
3.	"No Funciona (Si No Me Conecto)"	L. Marrero	3:51
4.	"Te Necesito (Featuring Christine D'Clario)"	A. Zurdo, L. Marrero	4:14
5.	"Dale Pal Monte (Remix)"	L. Lozada, L. Marrero	3:35
6.	"Corazones Puro"	L. Marrero	3:44
7.	"Heme Aquí (Featuring Redimi2)"	W. Gonzalez, L. Marrero	3:17
8.	"Llego El Cocorote"	L. Lozada, L. Marrero	3:58
9.	"Solo Tu (Featuring Ricardo Rodriguez)"	A. Zurdo, L. Marrero, R. Rodríguez, Bin Soto	4:09
10.	"Yo Ganare"	W. González, L. Marrero	3:59
11.	"Ella Quiere Que La Miren"	W. Gonzalez, L. Marrero	3:58
12.	"Justo a Tiempo"	L. Marrero	3:54
13.	"El Rankiaito"	L. Lozada, L. Marrero	4:20
14.	"No Me Hablen De Problemas"	L. Marrero	4:08
15.	"Dale Pal Monte"	L. Lozada, L. Marrero	4:01

== Personnel ==
- Produced by: Luis "Funky" Marrero, Orlando Rodriguez, Orlando Quest Mendez, Obed “El Arquitecto”

== Release history ==
Region	Date
South America	February 7, 2011
