= Anike (rapper) =

Nigerian American Christian hip hop artist

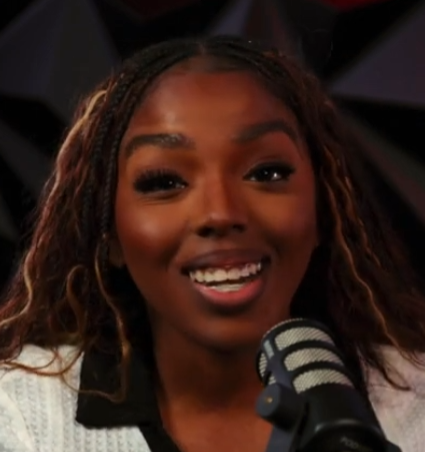
- Anike in 2024

Background information
- Also known as: Wande, Anike Dees
- Born: Mutiat Yewande Isola; March 4, 1996 (age 30); Nigeria
- Origin: Austin, Texas, U.S.
- Genres: Christian hip hop; trap gospel
- Occupations: Rapper; A&R administrator; music journalist; actress
- Years active: 2013–present
- Labels: Reach; Anike Sounds
- Member of: 116
- Website: anike.net

Ireoluwa-Anike Dees (born Mutiat Yewande Isola), known professionally as Anike (formerly known as Wande), is a Nigerian-American rapper, actress and former journalist and A&R administrator from Austin, Texas, United States. She signed to the Christian hip hop label Reach Records in 2019, where she had worked as an A&R administrator. Prior to that, as an independent artist, from 2013 through 2018 she released multiple singles and made numerous featured appearances on various songs, as well as worked as a music journalist. She is the first woman signed to Reach. Her debut extended play (EP), Exit, was released on April 24, 2020, followed by a mini-EP The Decision on December 4, 2020.

== Biography ==
=== Early life ===
Anike was born in Nigeria but raised in Round Rock, Texas and then Austin, Texas, United States. Most of her family members were Muslims, except for her mother, who was Christian. At first she was not allowed to go to church, and then started having to get up at 5 A.M. to read the Bible and go with her mother to work so that she could get picked up to go to church. Anike said in April 2020 that she used to joke "that I'd go to Mosque and church". Her curiosity about God led her to search on the internet for Christian rap, and the first result to come up was the 2006 song "Prayin' for You" by Lecrae. In sixth grade, she started playing the flute and studied music through junior high school. She converted to Christianity in seventh grade while interning at a camp in 2009 in Columbus, Texas, a decision for which she encountered opposition from within her family. While at the camp, she also saw a performance by the Christian hip hop collective 116 Clique, which at that time consisted of Lecrae, Trip Lee, Tedashii, and Sho Baraka.

=== Early career ===
Despite this initial interest in music, Anike wanted to be a doctor, and enrolled in a health and science program in junior high school. She became interested in rapping after a biology teacher allowed her to compose a rap about cellular transport instead of writing an essay or making a presentation. Despite this, she initially continued in studying health and sciences, even acquiring a license to be a nurse's aid. According to Anike, she had "an internal struggle with the whole rap thing. Africans don't really mess with creative careers. You either become a doctor or a lawyer." However, she decided to switch majors and went into journalism and public relations at University of Texas at Austin. As a journalist, she anticipated that she could get access to artists, attend concerts, and conduct interviews. She soon started writing for the Christian hip hop website Rapzilla, and started assisting the Christian hip hop record label RMG. She rapped at campus events as a form of Christian ministry. She was a member of the Alpha Kappa Alpha which she denounced and left and Sigma Phi Lambda sororities, the National Association of Black Journalists, IGotSole Dance Company, and the Texas Orange Jackets. Her first released record was a feature on the song "B.I.G." by D-Flow on their 2013 album Quarter to Vinci. She released her first single, "No Flex" featuring ikilledmarlon, in May 2016. She performed at South by Southwest in 2016, 2017, and 2018. She did some A&R work for Ace Harris, and 2017, while still pursuing her university education, she began an internship at Reach Records. She released eleven songs during 2018, making the Rapzilla list of 15 Freshman of 2019. Shortly before her graduation in 2018 she was hired as an administrator for the label's A&R.

=== Reach Records (2018—present) ===
The following year, after five months after her hire as A&R, she was signed as a recording artist to Reach. She released her debut single on the label, "Blessed Up", in April. The single would be listed the next year on Michelle Obama's playlist. Wande is the first woman signed to the label. She has expressed a hope that her signing will make it easier for other women rappers to pursue a career in the highly male-dominated Christian hip hop genre. "I think it'll show other labels that you shouldn't be afraid to sign females. I hear a lot of excuses like, 'Oh it's expensive' or 'Oh, we don't know how the market will react to a woman.' 'Will they buy her music?' Obviously, a lot of Christian companies don't have the money to just casually experiment with a Christian artist because you have to make sure they are profitable. So a lot of women get the short end of the stick because they don't want to gamble on a woman." She said that it initially took a while for her music to be released because of resistance that she encountered in the music industry because her abilities were undervalued on account of her being a woman. For example, she recounts that "I would fly somewhere, write a whole album, and would ask for the beat and the person wouldn't send the song. I learned a lot about how people value you." She also has mentioned the difficulty in getting exposure to her music when her lyrics do not discuss sex.

On March 30, 2020, Anike announced her forthcoming debut album, Exit, and the single "Happy" was released April 3, 2020. "Be the Light", featuring Evan and Eris, followed as a single on April 17, 2020. Exit was released on April 24, 2020. Wande also has released music has part of 116 (formerly 116 Clique). She said in an April 2020 interview that her father and her have made peace over her conversion and her decision to pursue a hip-hop music career. On December 4, 2020, she released a three-song mini-EP entitled The Decision. (Note: The Decision is listed by retailers and streaming services such as Apple Music and Spotify, respectively, as a single, but descriptions of it by news sources call it an EP.)

=== Name change ===
In July 2024, she changed her stage name from Wande to Anike, a short form of her new middle legal name, Ireoluwa-Anike, a Yoruba phrase meaning "the goodness of God"

== Personal life ==
In addition to English, Anike is fluent in Yoruba.

In the spring of 2022, she married Darius Dees.

== Discography ==
=== Albums ===
List of albums with selected details
Title	Details
Exit	Released: April 24, 2020; Label: Reach; Formats: Digital download, streaming

=== EPs ===
List of EPs with selected details
Title	Details
The Decision	Released: December 4, 2020; Label: Reach; Formats: Digital download, streaming
The Rap Pack	Released: March 28, 2025; Label: Reach; Formats: Digital download, streaming

=== Singles ===
==== As lead artist ====
List of singles as lead artist showing year released and album name
Title	Released	Album
"No Flex" (featuring ikilledmarlon)	2016	Non-album singles
"They Didn't Know"	2016	Non-album singles
"Hiatus Freestyle"	2017	Non-album singles
"Elevated" (featuring Bryon Juane)	2018	Non-album singles
"Fuego"	2018	Non-album singles
"Fuego" (remix) (featuring Parris Chariz)	2018	Non-album singles
"I Gotta Live"	2018	Non-album singles
"Blessed Up"	2019	Non-album singles
"In Luv"	2019	Summer Nineteen
"BAND$" (featuring Byron Juane)	2019	Summer Nineteen
"No Limits"	2019	Non-album single
"Happy"	2020	Exit
"Be the Light" (featuring Evan and Eris)	2020	Exit
"Come My Way" (featuring Teni and Toyé)	2020	Summer Twenty
"Last"	2020	The Decision
"Blessed Up" (remix) (featuring Lecrae and Mike Todd)	2021	Non-album single
"Don't Worry 'Bout It" (with Porsha Love)	2021	Summer Twenty-One
"Big God"	2022	Non-album singles
"They Didn't Know II"	2022	Non-album singles

==== As featured artist ====
List of singles as featured artist showing year released and album name
Title	Year	Album
"B.I.G." (D-Flow featuring Wande)	2013	Quarter to Vinci
"Gotta Go" (Dru Bex featuring Jeremy Rodney-Hall and Wande)	2018	Non-album single
"Level 3" (Xay Hill featuring Silver Steph, Wande, Torey D'shaun, Roy Tosh, Raw B and Parris Chariz)	2018	Red Ranger Pt.2
"Iran" (Joey Vantes featuring Wande)	2018	The Fall
"She Got Aesthetic" (Not Klyde featuring Wande & Parris Chariz)	2018	Lil Foil 39
"Groove" (DJ Standout featuring Cass, Wande, and Eris Ford)	2019	Non-album single
"Holy Ghost" (Mandela Dunamis featuring Wande)	2019	The Light Show
"Pretty Sad" (V. Rose featuring Wande)	2019	Non-album singles
"Perfectly Loved" (remix) (Courtnie Ramirez featuring Wande)	2019	Non-album singles
"We Fight (Color Purple)" (Datin featuring 1K Phew and Wande)	2020	Non-album singles
"Good Now" (remix) (DOE featuring Wande)	2021	Non-album singles
"Found" (TobyMac featuring Terrian and Wande)	2022	Life After Death
"Firm Foundation (He's Gonna Make a Way)" (Maverick City Music featuring Bobbi Storm and Wande)	2023	The Maverick Way Complete

=== Guest appearances ===
List of non-single guest appearances year released, other artist(s) featured, and album name
Title	Year	Other artist(s)	Album
"The Last One"	2020	Marty	Marty for President 2
"Ella"	2020	116, Lizzy Parra	Sin Vergüenza
"Restored Remix"	2020	Hulvey, 1K Phew	Restoration: The Deluxe Album

=== Music videos ===
==== As lead artist ====
List of music video appearances as lead artist with the associated album, directors, and other performers
Title	Year	Other artist(s)	Director
"Blessed Up"	2019		Mikael Coleman
"No Cap"	2019		SwervetDance
"No Ceilings"	2019		Mikael Coleman
"Happy"	2020		Mikael Coleman
"Woo"	2020		Aaron Chewning
"Come My Way"	2020	Teni, Toyé	Ed Dinzole
"Last"	2020		Mikael Coleman
"Blessed Up" (remix)	2021	Lecrae, Mike Todd	Keenon Rush
"Big God"	2021		Jonny Clay
"They Didn't Know II"	2022		Mikael Coleman and Roxy Coleman

==== As featured artist ====
List of music video appearances as a featured artist with the associated album, directors, and other performers
Title	Year	Other artist(s)
"The Last One"	2020	Marty

== Filmography ==
Year	Title	Role	Notes
2023	Stanton	Sarana	Feature film
