= Sin vergüenza =

Sin vergüenza may refer to:

- Sin vergüenza (TV series), a 2007 Spanish-language telenovela
- Sin vergüenza (film), a 2001 film by Joaquín Oristrell
- Sin Vergüenza (Bacilos album), 2004
- Sin Vergüenza (116 album)
