= Amped (116 Clique EP) =

EP by 116 Clique
- Released: August 28, 2007
- Genre: Rock; hip hop
- Label: Reach

116 Clique chronology
13 Letters (2007)	Amped (2007)	Man Up (2011)

Professional ratings
Review scores
Source	Rating
Rapzilla	4.5/5 stars

Amped is a remix/compilation album containing remixed tracks and new tracks. It is the third compilation album, second remix album, and first EP by the 116 Clique. It peaked at No. 24 on the Billboard Gospel albums chart.

== Track listing ==
1. "Send Me/Represent"
2. "Red Revolution"
3. "Beyond Belief"
4. "Cash or Christ/Fanatic"
5. "No More"
6. "Amped"
