= Jóvenes Somos =

Studio album by Evan Craft
- Released: 16 August 2014
- Recorded: 2014
- Genre: Worship; Latin Christian music
- Length: 36:00
- Language: Spanish, English
- Label: Evan Craft Music

Evan Craft chronology
Yo Soy Segundo (2012)	Jóvenes Somos (2014)	Sesión Orgánica: Parte 1 (2015)

Jóvenes Somos is a studio album from American Evan Craft. It was released on August 16, 2014 on Craft's own Evan Craft Music label.

== Critical reception ==
Professional ratings
Review scores
Source	Rating
365 Days of Inspiring Media	3.5/5 stars

Joshua Andre, in a three and a half star review for 365 Days of Inspiring Media, wrote:

Jóvenes Somos is one of the surprise packages of 2014, that came out of left field for me. But it is still enjoyable, albeit on the short side; nevertheless it is fun to listen to these melodies again and again. Well done Evan! I pray that many people are blessed by this album, and hopefully listeners can be exposed to more music genres through this musically diverse, creative and eclectic batch of songs.

== Track listing ==
Jóvenes Somos
No.	Title	Length
1.	"Jóvenes Somos"	3:42
2.	"Cautivado"	3:49
3.	"Te Exaltaré"	3:30
4.	"Rey Glorioso"	3:28
5.	"Arquitectura" (featuring Jonathan Thulin)	3:37
6.	"We Are the Young"	3:42
7.	"Collide"	3:48
8.	"Glorify"	3:30
9.	"Risen King"	3:28
10.	"Arquitectura" (featuring Jonathan Thulin)	3:14
Total length:		36:00
