= Yo Soy Segundo =

Studio album by Evan Craft
- Released: 25 September 2012
- Recorded: 2012
- Studio: The Gravity Room
- Genre: Worship; Latin Christian music
- Length: 44:43
- Language: Spanish
- Label: Dream Records, Evan Craft Music

Evan Craft chronology
Giants (2012)	Yo Soy Segundo (2012)	Jóvenes Somos (2014)

Yo Soy Segundo is a studio album by American Evan Craft. It was released on September 25, 2012 by Dream Records and Evan Craft Music labels.

== Content ==
The album features Dream Records artist Jonathan Thulin. Evan Craft said:

"Words cannot describe the excitement in my heart for releasing this album! Seeing lives transformed in worship as the presence of the Lord descends in our worship is all I can ask for and more! Take a look at the album. and give it to someone who needs to be encouraged."

– Evan Craft, Cross Rhythms

== Release and promotion ==
Yo Soy Segundo was released in 2012 on Dream Records and distributed through Universal. It charted on various Christian radio and download charts.

Professional ratings
Review scores
Source	Rating
New Release Today	5/5 stars

== Track listing ==
Yo Soy Segundo
No.	Title	Length
1.	"Eres Rey"	4:16
2.	"Yo Soy Segundo"	3:13
3.	"Entrego Todo"	3:51
4.	"Sólo Eres Tú"	4:36
5.	"Dame Fe"	4:12
6.	"Ante El Gran Trono"	3:41
7.	"Por Tu Amor"	5:31
8.	"En Tus Manos"	3:35
9.	"Aleluya"	3:46
10.	"Todo Debo a Él"	4:20
11.	"Brillamos"	3:42
Total length:		44:43

== Chart performance ==
In the United States, Yo Soy Segundo debuted at number 10 on the Latin Pop Albums chart, and number 30 on the Top Latin Albums chart in Billboard for the week ending 20 October 2012. It also debuted at number one on the Christian Latin Albums chart.

Chart (2012)	Peak position
US Christian Latin Albums (Billboard)	1
US Latin Pop Albums (Billboard)	10
US Top Latin Albums (Billboard)	30
