= 116 (hip-hop group) =

American rap group

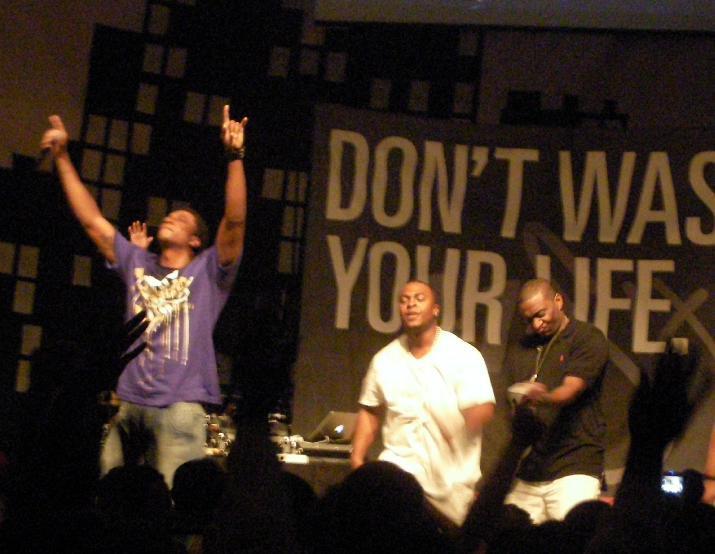
- 116 Clique on the Don't Waste Your Life Tour (2009)

Background information
- Also known as: 116 Clique
- Origin: Dallas, Texas, U.S.
- Genres: Southern hip-hop; Christian hip-hop; Latin hip-hop
- Years active: 2005–present
- Label: Reach
- Members: Lecrae; Tedashii; Trip Lee; 1K Phew; WHATUPRG; Anike; Hulvey; Limoblaze; Jackie Hill Perry
- Past members: Thi'sl; Json; Sho Baraka; Derek Minor; DJ Official; Aha Gazelle; KB; Gawvi; Andy Mineo
- Website: www.reachrecords.com/artists/116/

The 116, formerly 116 Clique (pronounced one-one-six click), is an American Southern Christian hip-hop collective originally from Dallas, Texas signed to the Atlanta-based Reach Records. The group performs a wide variety of contemporary hip-hop styles, from chopped and screwed to trap to Latin hip-hop. The 116 Clique is named after the Bible verse Romans 1:16: "For I am not ashamed of the gospel: for it is the power of God unto salvation to every one that believes; to the Jew first, and also to the Gentile." For them it means acknowledging the power of the Gospel and the divine calling to proclaim it in every area of their life. "We can lay our lives down to serve and glorify God in everything we do."

== History ==
The group debuted with The Compilation Album in 2005. DJ Primo remixed the original recordings the following year with The Compilation Album: Chopped and Screwed. The remix album included four bonus tracks. In 2007 they released 13 Letters, the album name representing the 13 letters Paul wrote to first-century Christians. In 2011 they released the Man Up compilation album. Man Up was intended for release on July 23, 2011. However, the official release date was pushed back to September 27, 2011. A corresponding film, directed by former member Sho Baraka, was made to show the importance of a godly man. The Man Up Movie & Concert Series tour took place in selected cities where fans could see a screening of Man Up followed by a concert with songs from the soundtrack. They released a single, "Come Alive", based on their 2012 Unashamed Tour. in 2013, the clique released "Now They Know", based on the Unashamed Tour V. On November 23, 2018, a digital Christmas album was released, entitled The Gift: A Christmas Compilation, and made available through most major streaming services. A playlist of some 14 songs, entitled "Summer 19" was released on July 19, 2019 by Reach under the auspices of the group. On October 23, 2020, 116 released Sin Vergüenza, a collaboration between Reach and No Apologies Music which features a combination of American hip-hop and Latin urbano artists. All two dozen tracks were released as singles.

== Discography ==
The discography of 116, formerly known as 116 Clique, a Christian hip-hop collective originating from Dallas, Texas, consists of six studio albums, one of which was a remix album, one remixed extended play (EP), twenty singles, seven music videos, and one video album. The collective formed in 2005 under the auspices of Reach Records, and released its first album, The Compilation Album, that year on December 27. The following year, a remixed version of the album by DJ Primo was released on July 6. A third album, 13 Letters, followed on June 19, 2007, which charted at No. 10 on the Billboard Top Gospel Albums chart and No. 29 on the Billboard Top Christian Albums chart, as well as the remix EP Amped on August 28. Man Up was released on September 27, 2011. A Christmas album, The Gift: A Christmas Compilation, was released on November 23, 2018, and charted at No. 27 on the Christian Albums chart. The Gift: Live Sessions, a live video album recorded at the 1971 studios in Atlanta, was released on November 28, 2019. The sixth album from the collective, Sin Vergüenza, a collaboration between Reach and No Apologies Music and a combination of continental United States hip-hop and Latin American urbano, was released on October 23, 2020. All twelve tracks from the recording were released as singles.

=== Studio albums ===
"—" denotes releases that did not chart

| Year | Title | Chart positions | |
| Year | Title | U.S. Gospel | U.S. Christ. |
|---|---|---|---|
| 2005 | The Compilation Album: Released: December 27, 2005; Label: Reach | — | — |
| 2006 | The Compilation Album: Chopped & Screwed: Released: July 6, 2006; Label: Reach | — | — |
| 2007 | 13 Letters: Released: April 20, 2007; Label: Reach | 10 | 29 |
| 2011 | Man Up: Release Date: September 27, 2011; Label: Reach | — | — |
| 2018 | The Gift: A Christmas Compilation: Released: November 23, 2018; Label: Reach Records | — | 27 |
| 2020 | Sin Vergüenza: Released: October 23, 2020; Label: Reach, No Apologies | — | — |

=== EPs ===
| Year | Title | Chart positions | |
| Year | Title | U.S. Gospel | U.S. Christ. |
|---|---|---|---|
| 2007 | Amped: First EP; Released: August 28, 2007; Label: Reach Records | 24 | — |

=== Singles ===
"—" denotes releases that did not chart

List of singles, with chart positions
| Title | Year | Peak chart positions | | | Album |
| Title | Year | US Christ | US Christ Digital | US Gospel Digital | Album |
|---|---|---|---|---|---|
| "Man Up Anthem" (featuring Lecrae, KB, Trip Lee, Tedashii, Sho Baraka, PRo, and Andy Mineo) | 2011 | — | 48 | 3 | Man Up |
| "Come Alive" (featuring Lecrae, KB, Andy Mineo, Trip Lee, Tedashii, and Derek Minor) | 2012 | — | 48 | 7 | Non-album singles |
| "Now They Know" (featuring Lecrae, Andy Mineo, KB, Tedashii, and Derek Minor) | 2013 | — | 11 | 3 | Non-album singles |
| "Light Work" (featuring Andy Mineo, 1K Phew, Tedashii, WHATUPRG, Lecrae, Trip Lee, and Cass) | 2018 | 41 | — | — | Non-album singles |
| "California Dreamin'" (featuring Lecrae and John Givez) | 2019 | — | — | — | Summer Nineteen |
| "Big Wave" (featuring Lecrae and Parris Chariz) | 2019 | — | — | — | Summer Nineteen |
| "Live Forever" (featuring 1K Phew, Aaron Cole, Hulvey, Tedashii, Tommy Royale, Trip Lee & Wande) | 2020 | — | — | — | Non-album single |
| "Celebrate More" (featuring Andy Mineo, Hulvey, and Lecrae) | 2020 | — | — | — | Summer 2020 |
| "Dónde Están (Watch06)" (featuring Cardec Drums, Manny Montes, DJ Mykael V, Wxlf, Aklesso, Yavier Luisan, Tedashii, and Ada Betsabé) | 2020 | — | — | — | Sin Vergüenza |
| "Voy a Amarte" (featuring Iván Rodríguez, Byron Juane, and Cardec Drums) | 2020 | — | — | — | Sin Vergüenza |
| "Rompe Bocina" (featuring Cardec Drums, Tommy Royale, and Social Club Misfits) | 2020 | — | — | — | Sin Vergüenza |
| "Mejor" (featuring Cardec Drums and Antonio Redes) | 2020 | — | — | — | Sin Vergüenza |
| "La Fiesta" (featuring Lecrae and Funky) | 2020 | — | — | — | Sin Vergüenza |
| "Ella" (featuring Wande and Lizzy Parra) | 2020 | — | — | — | Sin Vergüenza |
| "Como Yo" (featuring Niko Eme) | 2020 | — | — | — | Sin Vergüenza |
| "Como Fue" (featuring Don Ryvcko and Cardec Drums) | 2020 | — | — | — | Sin Vergüenza |
| "Celebramos" (featuring 1K Phew, Niko Eme, and Yavier Luisan) | 2020 | — | — | — | Sin Vergüenza |
| "Buso" (featuring Tommy Royale, Angie Rose, Cardec Drums, and Townix) | 2020 | — | — | — | Sin Vergüenza |
| "Bomba" (featuring Práctiko, Derek Minor, and Cardec Drums) | 2020 | — | — | — | Sin Vergüenza |
| "Ambiente" (featuring Tommy Royale and WHATUPRG) | 2020 | — | — | — | Sin Vergüenza |

=== Other charted songs ===
"—" denotes releases that did not chart

List of other charting songs
| Title | Released | Peak chart positions | Album |
| Title | Released | U.S. Gospel Digital | Album |
|---|---|---|---|
| "Repentance" | 2011 | 19 | Man Up |
| "Responsibility" | 2011 | 11 | Man Up |
| "Envy | 2011 | 13 | Man Up |

=== Guest appearances ===
List of other songs on which Lecrae has appeared
| Title | Released | Album |
|---|---|---|
| "Holla 116" (Trip Lee featuring 116 Clique) | 2006 | If They Only Knew |

=== Music videos ===
List music videos for which Lecrae is the lead artist
| Title | Released | Director |
|---|---|---|
| "116 Clique Video" | July 17, 2006 | Sho Baraka |
| "Man Up Anthem" (featuring Lecrae, KB, Trip Lee, Tedashii, Derek Minor, Andy Mineo, and Sho Baraka) | November 10, 2011 | Kyle Dettman |
| "Now They Know" (featuring Lecrae, Andy Mineo, KB, Tedashii, and Derek Minor) | May 12, 2014 | Kyle Dettman |
| "Big Wave" (featuring Lecrae and Parris Chariz) | August 28, 2019 | Mikael Coleman |
| "Live Forever" (featuring 1K Phew, Aaron Cole, Hulvey, Tedashii, Tommy Royale, Trip Lee, and Wande) | January 17, 2020 | (Note: No director credited) |
| "Celebrate More" (featuring Lecrae, Andy Mineo, and Hulvey) | July 31, 2020 | Aaron Chewning |
| "La Fiesta" (featuring Funky and Lecrae) | October 23, 2020 | Oust |

=== Video albums ===
| Year | Title |
|---|---|
| 2019 | The Gift: Live Sessions: Released: November 28, 2019; Label: Reach |

== Tours ==
In 2008, Lecrae, Trip Lee, Sho Baraka and Tedashii went on the Unashamed Tour. In 2010, Lecrae, Tedashii, Trip Lee, Sho Baraka, PRo and DJ Official went on the Unashamed Tour 2010. Lecrae was on the 2011 Mission Cruise (Cruise with a Cause) on May 30 – June 4, 2011.

- Unashamed (Summer 2008) Lecrae, Tedashii, Trip Lee, Sho Baraka
- Don't Waste Your Life Tour (Summer 2009) Lecrae, Tedashii, Trip Lee, Sho Baraka, with special guest Flame.
- Unashamed 2010: The Movement (Fall 2010) Lecrae, PRo, Tedashii, Trip Lee, Sho Baraka, DJ Official
- Man Up: Movie & Concert Series (Fall 2011) Lecrae, PRo, Tedashii, KB, Sho Baraka, Trip Lee and Andy Mineo
- Unashamed Tour 2012: Come Alive (Fall 2012) Lecrae, Trip Lee, Tedashii, Derek Minor (formerly known as PRo), KB, Andy Mineo, with special guests Propaganda and Thi'sl
- Unashamed Tour V (Fall 2013) Lecrae, Tedashii, Derek Minor, KB, and Andy Mineo with special guest Swoope
- Unashamed Forever Tour (Spring 2019) Lecrae, Tedashii, Trip Lee, KB, Andy Mineo, GAWVI, 1K Phew and WHATUPRG
- We Are Unashamed Tour (Spring 2022) Lecrae, Tedashii, 1K Phew, Andy Mineo, Wande, WHATUPRG, Trip Lee and Hulvey.
