= Evan Craft =

American singer-songwriter (born 1991)

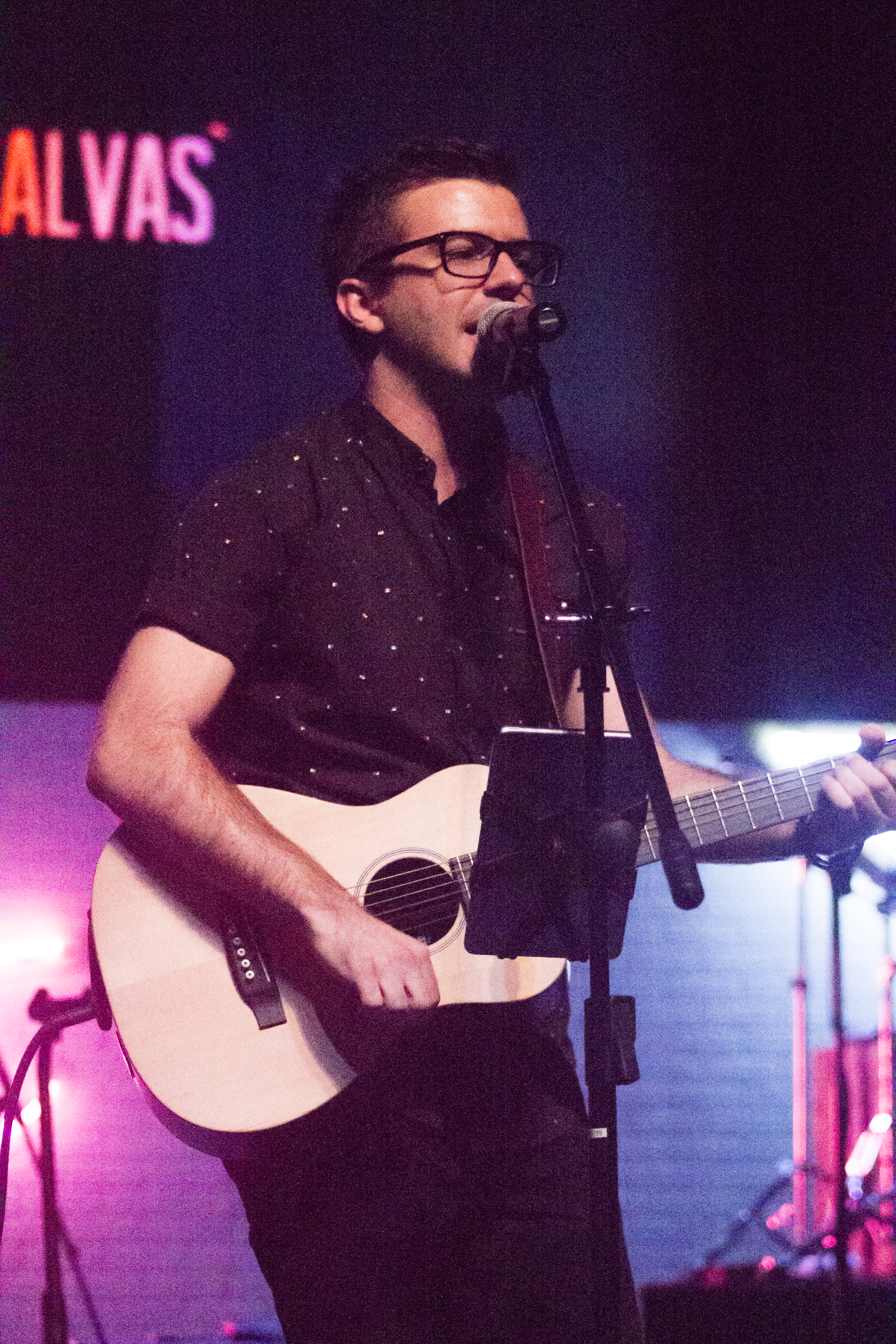
- Evan Craft in live concert 2014

Background information
- Born: Evan Kenneth Craft; April 8, 1991 (age 34); Conejo Valley, California
- Genres: Latin Christian; Contemporary worship music; contemporary Christian music
- Occupations: Worship leader; songwriter; singer
- Instruments: Vocals, guitar
- Years active: 2010–present
- Labels: Dream Records, EMI CMG, Evan Craft Music
- Website: www.evancraftmusic.com

Evan Kenneth Craft (born April 8, 1991) is an American Contemporary worship music singer. Craft has recorded albums in Spanish and English. His second studio album, Yo Soy Segundo, peaked at number 10 on the Latin Pop Albums chart and at number 30 on the Top Latin Albums chart. Craft has been nominated for multiple awards.

== Biography ==
Evan Craft was born in 1991 in Conejo Valley, California. Craft began to play the guitar at the age of 12 and there he began to write songs. Craft expanded his linguistic studies at university, attending schools in Spain and Costa Rica.

== Musical career ==
Evan Craft began writing songs during high school. For his first album in Spanish, he joined other musicians such as Sean and Ryan Cook and Nico Aranda, to travel through different countries delivering evangelical messages through their performances in many Spanish churches, schools and orphanages.

Craft in 2012 released his first studio album Giants, under the record label Dream Records.

In the same year, he released his first Spanish album, Yo Soy Segundo, distributed through Universal. The album debuted in the United States at the top on the Billboard Latin Christian Albums, at number 10 on the Latin Pop Albums chart and at number 30 on Top Latin Albums chart. In 2014, his third studio album, Jóvenes Somos, was released.

In 2015, his fifth studio album, Principio Y Fin, was released under the record label Essancy Music. The album has the participation of the American Carlos PenaVega in the main song, it also has other collaborations by other artists such as Danilo Montero, Ingrid Rosario, Seth Condrey and Un Corazón's Lluvia Richards. The album was nominated for the 2016 GMA Dove Award Spanish Language Album of the Year. In 2017, his seventh studio album, Impulso, was released, which works with artists such as Marcos Witt, Alex Campos, Marcela Gándara, Funky, Redimi2, among others. The album was nominated for 2018 GMA Dove Award Spanish Language Album of the Year. In December 2019, he released with Jordan Feliz the bilingual single "Faith (Fe)".

In 2021, Craft's double album, Desesperado, was released, which was a hit with songs like "Tu Señor", "Desesperado", among other songs. The album debuted at number 45 on Billboard's Top Christian Albums chart. "Be Alright" was released as a single with Danny Gokey and Redimi2. The song peaked at number two on the Hot Christian Songs chart, at number three on the Christian Digital Song Sales chart, at number 5 on the Christian Airplay and Christian AC charts, and at number 9 on the Christian Streaming Songs chart. He won at the 52nd GMA Dove Award for Spanish Language Album of the Year for Desesperado. In 2022, he released a "Be Alright"'s remix with KB and Sam Rivera.

== Personal life ==
On March 2, 2021, Craft published a video on his YouTube channel in which he is seen with a ring proposing to his girlfriend Rachel Jacoby. He shared in September the news that he had married Jacoby.

== Discography ==
- Spotlight (2010)
- Giants (2012)
- Yo Soy Segundo (2012)
- Jóvenes Somos (2014)
- Sesión Orgánica: Parte 1 (2015)
- Principio y Fin (2015)
- Sesión Orgánica: Parte 2 (2016)
- Impulso (2017)
- Desesperado (2021)
- Tierra Santa (2021)
- Holy Ground (2021)
- Chances (2023)
- Más Rico del Mundo (2023)

== Awards and nominations ==
Award	Year (Note: Indicates the year of ceremony. Each year is linked to the article about the awards held that year, wherever possible.)	Nominee/work	Category	Result	Ref.
GMA Dove Awards	2016	Principio y Fin	Spanish Language Album of the Year	Nominated	
GMA Dove Awards	2018	"Lléname" (with Harold y Elena)	Spanish Language Recorded Song of the Year	Nominated	
GMA Dove Awards	2018	Impulso	Spanish Language Album of the Year	Nominated	
GMA Dove Awards	2019	"Mi Casa Es Tu Casa"	Spanish Language Recorded Song of the Year	Nominated	
GMA Dove Awards	2021	Desesperado	Spanish Language Album of the Year	Won	
GMA Dove Awards	2022	"Be Alright"	Song of the Year	Nominated	
