= Sin Vergüenza (116 album) =

Compilation album by 116 Clique
- Released: October 23, 2020
- Studio: Reach Records; No Apologies Music
- Genre: Christian hip hop, Latin music
- Label: Reach

116 Clique chronology
Summer 19 (2019)	Sin Vergüenza (2020)

Sin Vergüenza (Unashamed in English) is the first album entirely in Spanish by 116 Clique, produced and distributed by Reach Records, in association with No Apologies Music, the label of Puerto Rican producer Cardec Drums. It was announced to be released at the end of October 2020, and was promoted with two singles: "Donde están (Watcho6)" ("Where are they (Watcho6)" in English), between Reach artists and other Latin rappers, and "La Fiesta" ("The Party" in English) by Lecrae and Funky. In 2021, it was known that Reach would be in charge of the soundtrack of the Netflix movie, Blue Miracle, where it is composed of a large part of the musical pieces of this album.

== Background ==
Reach Records has been known for supporting Latino artists with American nationality. Artists such as Gawvi, Whatuprg, Alex Medina, have been part of the label, where they have been given the opportunity to perform songs in Spanish, such as Gawvi's EP 954 and Panorama, Pleasant Hill and RAUL from Whatuprg. With the incorporation of Cardec Drums to the works of Lecrae, KB, Andy Mineo, a link was opened between the music markets in English, and in Spanish, with songs clearly in Spanish or Spanglish appearing since Summer 19, with the remix of the single "Hold me Back" by KB, in collaboration with Niko Eme, Eliud L'Voices, Gabriel Rodríguez EMC and the main artist of the Cardec label, Tommy Royale.

=== "Donde están (Watcho6)" ===
"Donde están" ("Where They Are") and the entire project were created with the purpose and hope of uniting two universes: the Latin Urban sound and the American Christian hip hop. Thus, this song sets a tone of collaboration and celebration for both Americans and Latinos, by unifying the Spanish and English languages and incorporating Latino creators not only in music, but also in art, video, and the creative process. Due to COVID, the artists and team members were unable to meet and film the music video, so they decided to release the song with the lyric video, which was designed, created and animated by the Costa Rican creative, Llarod Montero.

=== "La Fiesta" by Lecrae and Funky ===
Lecrae and Funky have been artists who have shaped culture in their respective careers, so there is pressure to create a defining song knowing the potential impact both can have. Tommy Royale, Niko Eme, and Cardec Drums wrote the song during a creative camp at Reach Records and where, in addition, they wrote the majority of the album. From the beginning, they knew they wanted to create a memorable song, a theme that "inevitably inspires us to dance, and ultimately a hymn!" shared by Puerto Rican producer and Dove Award winner Jacob Cardec, known as Cardec Drums. The song makes a brief reference to the song "Bomba Para Afincar" by Vico C.

=== Reach and Netflix ===
In May 2021, it was announced that Reach would make an alliance with Netflix for the musicalization of the movie Blue Miracle. The songs on the album are used to set the film, in addition to other songs by artists of Latin descent such as Gawvi and Whatuprg.

== Tracklist ==
1. "Dónde Están (Watcho6)" (featuring Cardec Drums, Manny Montes, DJ Mykael V, Wxlf, Aklesso, Yavier Luisan, Tedashii, Ada Betsabé
2. "Rompe Bocina" (featuring Cardec Drums, Tommy Royale, Social Club Misfits)
3. "Como Yo" (featuring Niko Eme)
4. "Ella" (featuring Wande, Lizzy Parra)
5. "La Fiesta" (featuring Lecrae, Funky)
6. "Buso" (featuring Tommy Royale, Angie Rose, Cardec Drums, Townix)
7. "Bomba" (featuring Practiko, Derek Minor, Cardec Drums)
8. "Voy a Amarte" (featuring Iván Rodríguez, Byron Juane, Cardec Drums)
9. "Como Fue" (featuring Don Ryvcko, Cardec Drums)
10. "Mejor" (featuring Cardec Drums, Antonio Redes)
11. "Celebramos" (featuring 1K Phew, Niko Eme)
12. "Ambiente" (featuring Tommy Royale, WHATUPRG)

=== Notes ===
- The song "Bomba" contains a reference to the song "Señor Oficial" by Eddie Dee.
- The song "Mejor" refers to "Te Boté" in his chorus.
- The song "Ambiente" had already been released previously, however, it was included with a slightly different version.
- The song "La Fiesta" is featured on the MLB The Show 21 soundtrack.
