= Giants (Evan Craft album) =

Studio album by Evan Craft
- Released: 26 March 2012
- Recorded: 2011
- Genre: Worship; Latin Christian music
- Length: 45:00
- Language: English, Spanish
- Label: DREAM Records

Evan Craft chronology
Spotlight (2010)	Giants (2012)	Yo Soy Segundo (2012)

Giants is the second studio album by American Evan Craft. It was released on March 26, 2012, by DREAM Records.

== Background ==
"It's an exciting time in my life being able to work with such wonderful and talented people, but there is an unsurpassed joy of being in the pocket of where God has me right now. This CD is the journey of testing God's grace to being thrown to my knees by the weight of not deserving grace at all. This whole adventure is rolled up into the inspired melodies to encourage people's hearts by my own experiences. If someone can listen to "Broken Heart" and be comforted or be set on fire by "Reclaimed" to fight human injustice then it's done it's job. Please tune your heart to the rhythms of this album and enjoy my finest work yet!"

– Evan Craft, New Release Today

== Critical reception ==
Professional ratings
Review scores
Source	Rating
Cross Rhythms	8/10 squares
New Release Today	4/5 stars

Ewan Jones, allocating the album an eight out of ten review at Cross Rhythms, wrote, "Giants is actually a really rather good pop album. I'm really rather impressed with this album - the songs are well written and produced with imagination, it works as a coherent whole, yet showcases a variety of styles (there's even a Spanish language ballad in 'No Hay Nadie' to close the set), and it definitely sets Craft up as one to watch." Jonathan Andre from Indie Vision Music said, "Overall: Evan Craft's Giants is a unique and different debut from an artist that has certainly left his own good mark on the musical industry. From soaring ballads and meaningful melodies to songs that need focal attention; this is a record that is able to stand tall on a release date that harbours other releases like TobyMac's Dubbed & Freq’d, Jimmy Needham's Clear the Stage and Britt Nicole's Gold. With many genres colliding at once on this 11 track musical journey, fans of CCM music in general should take a look at Evan's debut release!

== Track listing ==
Giants
No.	Title	Length
1.	"The Sky Is Falling"	4:29
2.	"Fight or Flee"	0:50
3.	"Giants"	3:30
4.	"Get Up"	3:35
5.	"Broken Heart" (featuring Qis Walker and Lauren Thurston)	3:43
6.	"Reclaim"	3:42
7.	"Human" (featuring Jonathan Thulin)	4:25
8.	"Lay Me Down"	4:15
9.	"Fighting Clarity"	3:42
10.	"Clarity"	3:29
11.	"No Hay Nadie"	5:45
12.	"Broken Heart" (Radio Version)	3:21
Total length:		45:00
