= Datin (rapper) =

American rapper

- Also known as: Datin
- Born: Edward Berrios; January 26, 1985 (age 41); Newark, New Jersey
- Genres: Christian hip hopPolitical hip-hop
- Occupations: Rapper, songwriter
- Instrument: Vocals
- Years active: 2000–present
- Label: God Over Money
- Website: godovermoney.com/artist/datin/

Edward Berrios (born January 26, 1985), better known by the stage name Datin, is an American Christian hip hop musician of Puerto Rican decent. He has released several projects including his hit mixtape "Turn It Off Vol 1", "The ROAR", "The Menace Mixtape", "Hell In The Hallway", as well as featured on many other popular artist albums. On February 12, 2016, he released his first studio album The Roar under God Over Money Records. This album was his breakthrough release and landed at the top of several Billboard magazine charts. Datin has also announced his upcoming Mixtape "CHH Ain't Dead Vol.1", which is expected to drop in early 2020.

== Early life ==
Datin was born in Newark, NJ, where he was raised by father, Edward Berrios, and mother, Maria, along with his sister, Jennifer He graduated from Barringer High School, where he started to hone his rapping skills.

== Music career ==
Datin began his career as an underground battle rapper. Datin, having many wins under his belt (including earning the title of 106 and Park freestyle Friday champion) started to catch the attention of several record labels. He nearly signed with Shady Records.

In 2014, Datin signed with God Over Money Records. His first studio album The Roar was released on February 12, 2016. This album was his breakthrough and landed upon the Billboard magazine chart, where it placed and peaked on the Christian Albums at No. 11, Independent Albums at No. 18, Rap Albums at No. 18, and Heatseekers Albums at No. 6.

== Personal life ==
Datin resides in Tampa, Fl with his wife, Stephanie Berrios.

== Discography ==
List of albums, with selected chart positions
Title	Album details	Peak chart positions			
Title	Album details	US CHR	US IND	US RAP	US HEAT
The Roar	Released: February 12, 2016; Label: God Over Money; CD, digital download	11	18	18	6
