= Rick Trotter =

American public address announcer

Rick Trotter is an American registered sex offender and former public address announcer for the Memphis Grizzlies of the National Basketball Association.

== Career ==
A graduate of Tri-Cities High School in East Point, Georgia, Trotter formerly worked as a restaurant manager at Chick-fil-A.

Trotter replaced John Paul Stevenson after the 2005-06 NBA season as the voice of the Grizzlies at FedExForum. Trotter reportedly idolized former Chicago Bulls public address announcer Ray Clay.

Trotter's employment was terminated by the Grizzlies on August 9, 2016, after an arrest warrant was issued on voyeurism charges. He was later sentenced to two months in jail and required to register as a sex offender.
