= Samuel Hernández =

Puerto Rican singer (born 1972)

- Born: Samuel Hernández Vega; September 26, 1972 (age 53)
- Origin: Caguas, Puerto Rico
- Genres: Christian music, Latin pop
- Occupations: Singer, songwriter
- Years active: 1993–present
- Website: samuelhernandez.com

Samuel Hernández (born September 26, 1972) is a Puerto Rican Christian music singer. He also has had songs crossover and become mainstream secular hits. His 2003 album Jesús siempre llega a tiempo was one of the first big-selling Puerto Rican Christian albums. He performed in the José Miguel Agrelot Coliseum with Marcos Witt in 2009. His best known song is "Levanto mis manos", which ranked # 32 on the Billboard Latin Pop Airplay chart.

He was nominated at Latin Grammy Award as Best Christian Album in 2004.

== Biography ==
Samuel Hernández Vega was born in Caguas, Puerto Rico. His parents, Elías Hernández and Raquel Vega, raised him in the ways of the Lord in the town of Cidra, Puerto Rico. His first production was Un Sueño Hecho Realidad ("A dream come true"), released in 1993. Later, he graduated earning a bachelor degree in Accounting and Marketing from Universidad Metropolitana, with excellent grades, and began to practice his profession, however, a car accident changed the course of his life.

Samuel expressed that he received the direct call to sing and depended on God. After that event, he released his second album "Soy Una Nueva Vasija", which includes the song "De Lo Más Profundo".

His third album, "Faltan 5 Para Las 12: ¡Jesús Llegó!", became a gold record just a few months after its release in mid-2000. It was the only Christian production in Puerto Rico that it has managed to occupy for 20 consecutive weeks # 1 position on Christian radio stations with the title track. Two years later, he released "Jesus Siempre Llega a Tiempo", a continuation of his previous production.

After this, many very well-received productions followed, which managed to enter Billboard charts, such as "Por Si No Hay Mañana", "Inyección de Fe" and the compilation "Éxitos".

"Me Conecta Al Cielo", Hernández's eighth album, contains the single "En Ti Lo Tengo Todo", with which he made his debut in the bachata genre.

In recent years, he released the albums "Duetos", "Gracias Señor En Vivo", and "Hay Poder En La Sangre de Jesús".

== Discography ==
Title	Peak chart positions			
Title	Billboard TLA	Billboard LPA	Billboard TCA	Billboard HA
Un sueño hecho realidad (1993)	—	—	—	—
Soy una vasija nueva (1997)	—	—	—	—
Dios siempre tiene el control (1999)	—	—	—	—
Faltan 5 pa las 12 llego Jesús (2000)	—	—	—	—
Jesús siempre llega a tiempo (2004)	36	10	—	—
En vivo desde Bellas Artes (2008)	—	—	—	—
Por si no hay Mañana (2009)	14	5	—	18
Inyección de Fe (2012)	30	11	—	44
Éxitos (2013)	—	—	—	—
Me Conecta al Cielo (2015)	—	—	—	—
Duetos (2016)	—	—	—	—
Gracias Señor En Vivo (2017)	—	—	—	—
Hay Poder en la Sangre de Jesús (2019)	—	—	—	—
