= Alex Zurdo =

Puerto Rican rapper (born 1983)

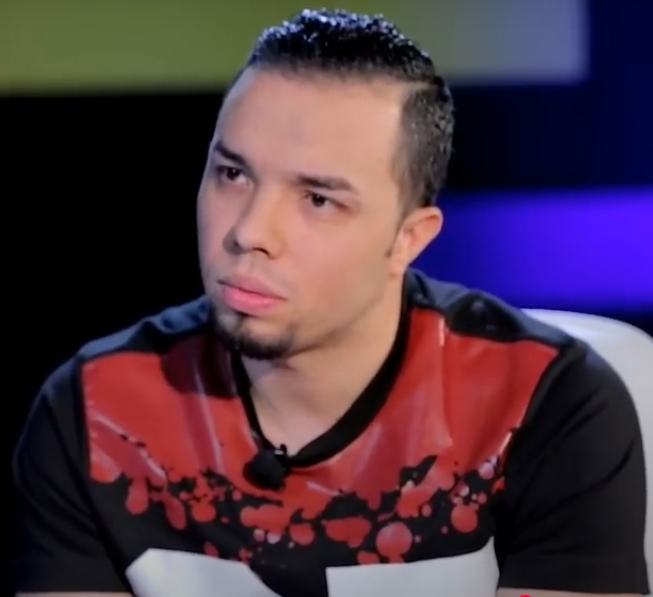
- Alex Zurdo in 2016

Background information
- Also known as: Alex Zurdo De la a a la Z
- Born: Alexis Vélez Alberio; June 10, 1983 (age 43)
- Origin: Puerto Rico
- Genres: Latin Christian; reggaeton; Christian hip hop; CCM
- Occupations: Rapper, songwriter
- Instruments: Piano and Trombone
- Years active: 2004–present
- Labels: AZ Music, Heaven Music, Nain Music
- Website: www.alexzurdomusic.com/site/

Alexis Vélez Alberio (born June 10, 1983), also known as Alex Zurdo, is a Puerto Rican Christian music rapper and songwriter.

He has almost a dozen musical productions, and has been awarded the GMA Dove Award and Arpa Awards, having also been nominated for a Latin Grammy, and a Tu Música Urbano award.

He has been the main artist in various concerts and events around Latin America, sharing stages with Funky, Vico C, Marcos Witt, Christine D'Clario, Tercer Cielo, Danilo Montero, Marcos Vidal, and collaborated with artists such as Olga Tañón, Gabriel Rodríguez EMC, among others.

== Musical career ==
Alex Zurdo was born on June 10, 1983, in Trujillo Alto, Puerto Rico. At the age of 11 he wrote his first rap songs. At 13, he had his first piano and learned to play it himself. In the following years he participated in several non-Christian rap and reggaeton productions as "Zurdo", in duet with Rey Blasto, Zurdo did also a duet with Blasto in 2003 in the album Rolexx: La Hora De La Venganza. In the next year at the age of 21, he began his musical ministry, including ministrations, conferences and seminars and launched his first production of Christian music, entitled Nada es mío, distributed by Universal Music Latino.

After his first album, Zurdo released from 2005 to 2009, one album per year. Albums such as Con propósito, Se trata de ti (with Jonny L), De Gloria en Gloria - La Trayectoria, Una y mil razones and Así son las cosas.

His seventh production titled Mañana Es Hoy ("Tomorrow is today") took three years. The musical production was in charge of the producer duo Marcos Ramírez and Víctor Torres (Los Tranz4Merz), Effect-O, DJ Cróniko and Zurdo himself. It was promoted with the single "¿Dónde estás?" ("Where are you?"), which talks about the importance of fatherhood. Since 2012, their productions have been released every two years, and nominations and recognitions for various ceremonies such as the Arpa Awards and AMCL began. This album is Zurdo's first to make it onto the Billboard charts, debuting at number 9 on Latin Rhythm Albums, remaining in the top 15 for over 20 weeks. For this record production, Zurdo won three AMCL Awards in 2012, in the categories Urban album of the year, Urban song of the year for "Mañana es hoy" and Musical intervention of the year for "Si no hay amor" ("If there is no love") with Vanessa Vissepó.

De la A a la Z ("From A to Z") was launched in 2014 and featured the participation of Redimi2, Christine D'Clario, Nancy Amancio and Samuel Hernández. The album debuted at number 4 on Billboard's Latin Rhythm Albums chart. This album won an AMCL Award in 2014 in the category Urban Album of the Year and Urban Song of the Year for "No soy yo" with Redimi2, and was also nominated at the 2015 Arpa Awards for "Best Urban Album".

On the "From A to Z" tour, Zurdo's first live album was recorded, which was titled AZ Live and was released in 2016. The concert that was used for the recording of the album was that of its presentation in his native country, specifically at the Coliseo de Puerto Rico José Miguel Agrelot. The album was nominated at the 2017 Arpa Awards in the categories "Best Live Album" and "Best Urban Album".

In 2018, he released his album ¿Quién contra nosotros? (Who Against Us? in English), also, it obtained at the Dove Awards the recognition of "Song of the Year in Spanish" for the single "Sin ti", while in 2019, being nominated as Best Christian Album in Spanish at the Latin Grammy Awards, Dove Awards and Arpa Awards, being the winner in these last two ceremonies as "Best Christian Album in Spanish", and "Best Urban Album", respectively. Then he launched M.E.M.E. in 2020, (acronym for "Menos Ego, Más Enfoque", "Less Ego, More Focus" in English), where the single "Toca la guitarra, Viejo" ("Play the guitar, dad") dedicated to his father, was approached by various media due to the theme touched, Alzheimer's.

In February 2021, he released UNO, an album collaborating with Funky and Redimi2. In March 2021, he participated in "Al Taller del Maestro", a benefit streaming concert performed by Alex Campos, where Evan Craft was also present.

In 2022, he released his first EP titled DTOX. In the third edition of the Tu Música Urbano Awards, he was recognized as Top Christian Artist, in addition to being nominated in the Urban Christian Song category again.

In 2023, he collaborated with Gocho on his return to music for the single "Hablaré". He again received nominations at the Tu Música Urbano Awards. He participated in the remix of "Danzando (Versión Urbana)" with Travy Joe, Harold Velázquez and the Venezuelan band Montesanto.

== Personal life ==
On April 8, 2008, he married Denisse Contreras, sister of singer Daliza Contreras, wife of Dominican rapper Willy González, known as Redimi2.

In 2011, his first child was born. In 2014, Zurdo became a father for the second time.

== Discography ==
- 2004: Nada es mío
- 2005: Con propósito
- 2006: Se trata de ti (with Jonny L)
- 2007: De Gloria en Gloria - La Trayectoria
- 2008: Una y mil razones
- 2009: Así son las cosas
- 2012: Mañana es hoy
- 2014: De la A a la Z
- 2016: AZ Live
- 2018: ¿Quién contra nosotros?
- 2020: M.E.M.E.
- 2021: UNO (with Funky and Redimi2)
- 2022: DTOX
- 2023: CONXION
- 2024:Dual (With Gabriel Rodriguez EMC)
- 2025 UNO Live(with Funky and Redimi2)
- 2025 Mayday

== Awards and nominations ==
=== Latin Grammy Awards ===
Year	Nominee / work	Award	Result
2019	¿Quién contra nosotros?	Best Christian Album	Nominated

=== Dove Awards ===
Year	Nominee / work	Award	Result
2018	Sin Ti	Spanish Language Recorded Song of the Year	Won
2019	¿Quién contra nosotros?	Spanish Language Album of the Year	Won
2019	Mi GPS	Spanish Language Recorded Song of the Year	Nominated
2021	UNO (with Funky & Redimi2)	Spanish Language Album of the Year	Nominated

=== Arpa Awards ===
Year	Nominee / work	Award	Result
2015	De la A a la Z	Best Urban Album	Nominated
2017	AZ Live	Best Urban Album	Nominated
2017	AZ Live	Best Live Album	Nominated
2019	¿Quién contra nosotros?	Best Urban Album	Won
2021	UNO (with Funky & Redimi2)	Best Urban Album or Track	Won
2023	"Guarda Tu Corazón"	Best Urban Album or Track	Nominated

=== Premios Tu Música Urbano ===
Year	Nominee / work	Award	Result
2020	Intentemos algo (Remix) ft. Gabriel EMC	Best Christian Song	Nominated
2022	Himself	Top Christian Artist	Won
2023	Himself	Top Artist — Christian-Spiritual	Nominated

=== Unción Awards ===
Year	Nominee / work	Award	Result
2012	Himself	Best Male Psalmist	Won
