= Funky (rapper) =

Puerto Rican rapper (born 1974)

Luis Raúl Marrero
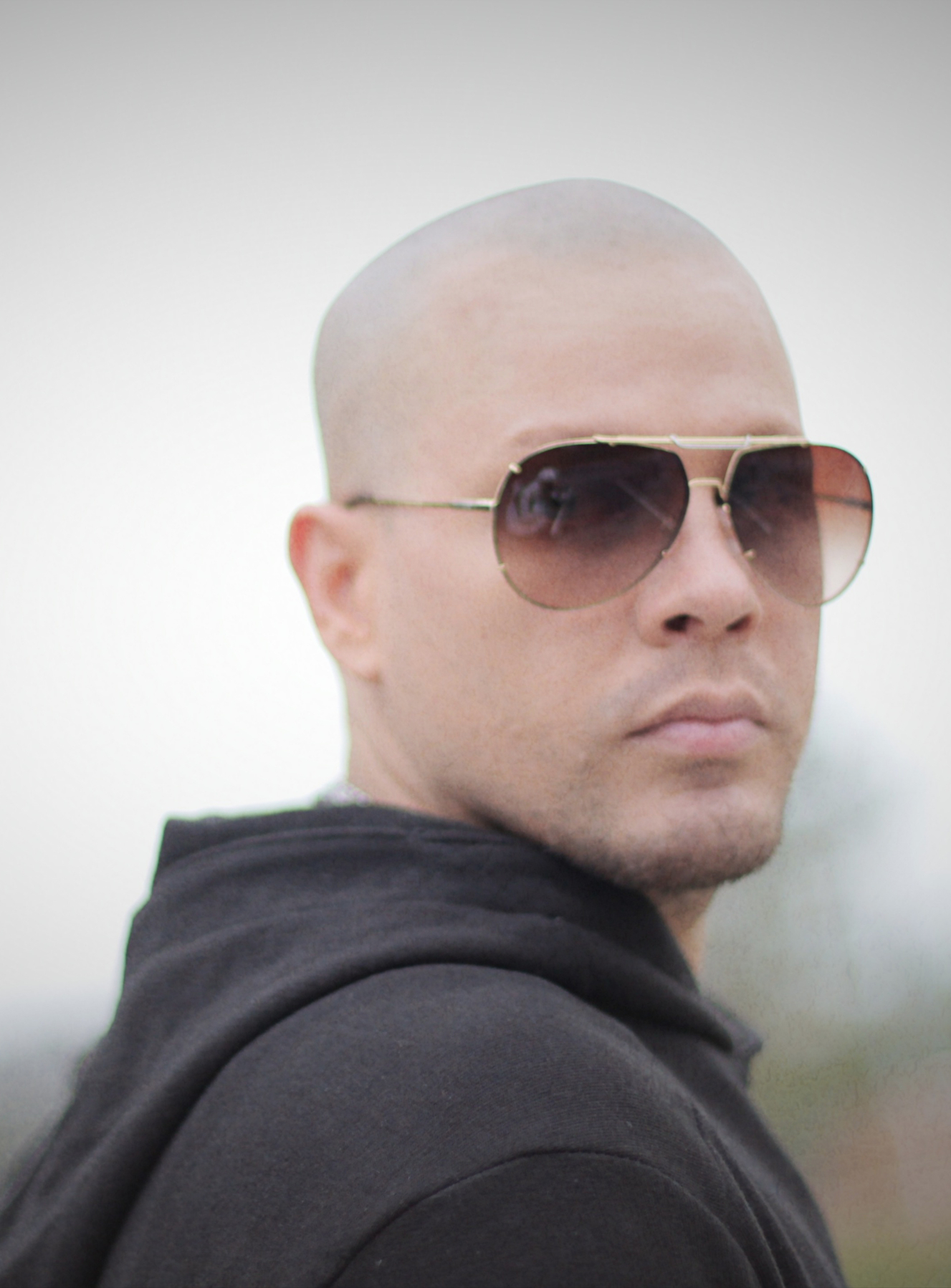
- Funky in 2014

Background information
- Born: January 23, 1974 (age 52); San Juan, Puerto Rico
- Genres: Latin rap; Reggaeton; Christian hip hop; CCM
- Occupations: Rapper; songwriter; producer
- Years active: 1998–present
- Labels: Funkytown Music, Heaven Music, Nain Music
- Website: funkypr.com

Luis Raúl Marrero (born January 23, 1974), also known by his stage name Funky, is a Puerto Rican rapper. With seven solo albums and multiple jobs as a producer, Marrero is internationally recognized as a hip hop and reggaeton Christian artist. He has collaborated with Christian music musicians, including Marcos Witt, Jesus Adrian Romero, and KJ-52, and has been nominated for two Latin Grammy awards. Funky has collaborated and produced for singers Vico C, Manny Montes, KJ-52, Marcos Witt, Israel & New Breed, Julissa, DJ Blass, Redimi2, Musiko, Alex Zurdo, Lilly Gooman, and others.

== Biography ==
Marrero was born in San Juan, Puerto Rico, on January 23, 1974. He began to explore music at the age of 15 under the influence of Puerto Rican Vico C, with whom he would later work on two of his nine albums.

In 1997, he met Vico C, with whom he established a friendship and a business. They collaborated on an album, marking an important stride in Marrero's musical career. In 1998, Marrero became a Christian. Marrero founded his own label, Funkytown Music, in 1999.

In 2001, he collaborated as a producer on Manny Montes's album "Realidades", and Marrero also sang in one of the songs. That same year he had his first success as a singer and producer in the Christian music genre: "Funkytown". Media outlets in Puerto Rico, as well as the international media, liked it, and it became a favorite among young listeners. With less than a year in the Christian music world, Marrero received a nomination to the Grammy Latino in 2003.

In 2002 Marrero released the album Especie En Peligro; with this album, he acquired several nominations and awards: Premios ARPA (Mexico, 2003 and 2004), Premios LA Conquista (California, 2004), Premio Integridad.com (2004) and Premios La Gente, (California, 2004).

In 2004, Marrero launched the production Los Vencedores, an album with more than 15 artists and other notable people within the genres.

He then launched the production Vida Nue.s.

In 2006, he made his first trip to South America, touring for 17 days and performing more than 25 concerts in Mexico, Argentina, Uruguay, Colombia, Dominican Republic, Panama, and the United States

Between 2006 and 2007, Marrero launched the production Corriendo Para Ganar, his third solo album and his sixth overall.

In 2008, Marrero announced the project "Flow Sinfónico", which displays a live soundtrack, accompanied by strings and horn arrangements.

In 2009, he made the tour "Conectado (Plugged-in) World Tour," which was based on the importance of the connection with God. The tour began May 8 in Viceroy Del Pino, Buenos Aires. Marrero also collaborated with American Christian rapper KJ-52 on the song "Fuego" from KJ-52's album Five-Two Television, and a music video has been filmed in Atlanta.

In February 2010, Marrero released the song "Hoy", which was the first single from his 2011 album Reset. In April 2010, he released the song "Corazones Puros", which was the second single from Reset. In January 2011, he released Reset. Later in 2011, the album earned Marrero a Latin Grammy award nomination. In May 2013, Marrero, with Redimi2, released the album Mas.

In 2020, he participated in the 116 album titled Sin Vergüenza, in collaboration with Lecrae in the single "La Fiesta". In 2021, he released an album called UNO with Alex Zurdo and Redimi2, reaching #1 on iTunes. Then, collaborated with Gerardo in the song "Agua amarga".

== Discography ==
Funky performing live

=== Albums ===
- Funkytown (2002)
- Especie En Peligro (2003)
- Los Vencedores (2004)
- Vida Nueva [with DJ Pablo] (2005)
- Corriendo Para Ganar (2006)
- Los Vencedores Platinum Edition (2008)
- Acceso Total Tour Edition (2008)
- Reset (2011)
- Mas(2013) With Redimi2
- Indestructible (2015)
- Agua (2019)
- UNO [with Alex Zurdo and Redimi2] (2021)
- ROJO (2022)
- Rewind XX+ (2023)
- Parentesis (2024)
- UNO Live(with Alex Zurdo and Redimi2)(2025)

=== Singles ===
Year	Title	Album
2002	"Funkytown"	Funkytown
2002	"Después De La Caída" (featuring René Gonzalez & Vico C)	Funkytown
2002	"Dale La Mano"	Funkytown
2003	"Tiene Que Correr" (featuring 7th Poet)	Especie En Peligro
2003	"Mi Maestro" (featuring Oscar Negron)	Especie En Peligro
2003	"Que Siga La Fiesta"	Especie En Peligro
2004	"Video Versión" (featuring Gran Manuel, Dr. P, Triple Seven, Rey Pirin & DJ Blass & Manny Montes)	Los Vencedores
2004	"Lo Que Traigo Es Flow"	Los Vencedores
2004	"Más Que Vencedor" (featuring Sammy)	Los Vencedores
2005	"Lo Que Traigo Es Flow (Remix)"	En Vivo Desde Costa Rica
2006	"Súbelo" (featuring Sammy)	Vida Nueva
2007	"Síguelo"	Corriendo Para Ganar
2007	"Me Estas Matando"	Corriendo Para Ganar
2007	"No Vuelvo Pa’tras" (featuring Alex Campos)	Corriendo Para Ganar
2008	"Ella Quiere Que La Miren"	Acceso Total: Tour Edition
2009	"Yo Se Que Ganaré"	Flow Sinfónico: El Antesala
2010	"Justo A Tiempo"	Plugged In (Codifying Plug)
2011	"Hoy"	Reset
2011	"No Te Cambio" (featuring Quest)	Reset
2011	"Te Necesito" (featuring Christine D’Clario)	Reset
2012	"No Te Cambio (Remix)" (featuring Quest)	Non-album single
2013	"Yo Soy Así" (Redimi2 & Funky)	Más
2014	"Todavía (Remix)" (featuring Redimi2)	Non-album single
2015	"Es"	Indestructible
2015	"Eres Mi Bendición" (featuring Alex Zurdo)	Indestructible
2015	"Va Caer La Lluvia"	Indestructible
2016	"Luz Y Sal" (featuring Edwin Sanchez)	Non-album single
2017	"No Fallara" (featuring Ander Bock)	Non-album single
2025	Colores(with Alex zurdo,Redimi2)	UNO Live
2025	El Cupable(with Alex Zurdo,Redimi2 featuring Dariana)	UNO Live
2025	MFDT(with Alex zurdo,Redimi2)	UNO Live
