= Premios Tu Música Urbano =

- Awarded for: boosting Latin urban music around the world
- Country: Puerto Rico
- First award: March 21, 2019; 7 years ago

Television/radio coverage
- Network: Telemundo Internacional (Latin America); Telemundo (United States)

The Premios Tu Música Urbano is a music industry awards ceremony presented by television network Telemundo Puerto Rico to recognize artists who "transcended and boosted the success of Latin urban music around the world" for the past year. The show has been held annually at the José Miguel Agrelot Coliseum in San Juan, Puerto Rico, since 2019, produced by Telemundo, Sora & Company and Mr. & Mrs. Entertainment, and broadcast by Telemundo Puerto Rico (in Latin America) and by Telemundo (in the United States). The awards were founded after an obvious lack of recognition of reggaetón, urbano and Latin trap artists was observed at the Latin Grammy Awards, as well as the (former) absence of any Latin urbano/reggaetón categories at the American Grammy Awards. Both organizations have since expanded their representation and categories.

== History ==
Following the exclusion of urban musicians for the Album, Record and Song of the Year categories at the 20th Latin Grammy Awards, Colombian artist J Balvin posted an image depicting a crossed-out gramophone —the official "grammy" logo—with the caption "Sin reggaeton, no hay Latin Grammy" ("Without reggaeton, there are no Latin Grammys"). The message was soon endorsed by other reggaetóneros, including Puerto Rican musicians Daddy Yankee, Farruko and Tego Calderón, and Boricua-American Nicky Jam, as well as Colombian singers Karol G and Maluma, who criticized the lack of nominations despite reggaetón being one of the most popular musical genres in the world.

Billboard's vice president for Latin music, Leila Cobo, supported their discontent, writing that the "Latin Academy has never shown much fondness for reggaeton as a genre" and proposed the creation of a "Latin Grammy reggaeton task force" in order to "foster diversity". The Latin Recording Academy responded to the controversy by stating that their members "select what they believe merits a nomination" and invited the "leaders of the urban community to get involved" with the nomination process, since "many" reggaeton artists were not registered Latin Grammy voters, and "many independent labels and producers [had] no notion of the process of submitting product and becoming a voting member".

The Latin Recording Academy was also accused of "whitewashing", due to Venezuelans artists, such as Chyno Miranda, Nacho, Neutro Shorty and Danny Ocean, receiving the most nominations at the 20th Latin Grammy Awards. The Grammy Awards' Recording Academy was also criticized for its Best Latin Rock, Alternative or Urban Album category, to which Rebeca León, J Balvin's manager and member of the academy's diversity and inclusion task force, referred to as Mexican rock band Zoé competing against J Balvin or American pop rock group Panic! At The Disco versus rapper Travis Scott. She also questioned the absence of a separate Latin urban category. Rolling Stone's Suzy Exposito criticized the Best Latin Rock, Alternative or Urban Album category for being a "hodgepodge".

In response to the lack of nominees and awards for reggaeton and Latin trap at the Grammy and Latin Grammy Awards, Telemundo Puerto Rico announced the Premios Tu Música Urbano to honor Latin urban music artists. Previously, a short-lived Latin urban-oriented awards show, the People's Choice Reggaetón & Urban Awards, was held during the mid-2000s at the José Miguel Agrelot Coliseum, but was cancelled due to production errors and the absence of famous artists. There was also a separate Best Latin Urban Album category at the Grammy Awards for two years before being merged with the Best Latin Rock/Alternative Performance category in 2010. The first edition of the Premios Tu Música Urbano was held on March 21, 2019, also at the José Miguel Agrelot Coliseum.

Following the controversy, the categories Best Reggaeton Performance and Best Rap/Hip Hop Song were created for the 21st Latin Grammy Awards, where J Balvin, Karol G, Maluma, Daddy Yankee, Puerto Rican acts Anuel AA, Bad Bunny and Ozuna, Puerto Rican producer Tainy and Colombian producer Sky received nominations for Album, Record and/or Song of the Year. J Balvin was the edition's most nominated artist, followed by Bad Bunny, Ozuna and Anuel AA. Gabriel Abaroa Jr., President of the Latin Recording Academy, stated that "[they] continued engaging in discussions with [their] members to improve the awards process" and that they are now "engaged, better informed, and committed to elevating and honoring musical excellence across all genres of Latin music." The Recording Academy added the Best Música Urbana Album category for the 64th Grammy Awards.

== Voting ==
The voting system is based on a pool of voters composed of 200 producers, influencers, radio directors and programmers, all specialized in urban music. The event's co-producer, Shirley Rodríguez, has stated that "sales, downloads and streaming are all taken in consideration to make the final decision."

== Ceremonies ==
#	Year	Artist of the Year	Album of the Year		Song of the Year	Multiple wins	Venue	Ref.
#	Year	Artist of the Year	Male	Female	Song of the Year	Multiple wins	Venue	Ref.
1	2019	Ozuna	Aura – Ozuna		"Dura" – Daddy Yankee	Ozuna (6)	José Miguel Agrelot Coliseum	
2	2020	Daddy Yankee	Oasis – Bad Bunny and J Balvin	Iluminatti – Natti Natasha	"Con Calma" – Daddy Yankee	Daddy Yankee and Ozuna (6)	José Miguel Agrelot Coliseum	
3	2022	Karol G	Legendaddy – Daddy Yankee	KG0516 – Karol G	"¿Qué Más Pues?" – J Balvin and María Becerra	Karol G (9)	José Miguel Agrelot Coliseum	
4	2023	Karol G	Feliz Cumpleaños Ferxxo Te Pirateamos el Álbum – Feid	Mañana Será Bonito – Karol G	"Provenza" – Karol G	Karol G (6)	José Miguel Agrelot Coliseum	
Not held in 2024								
5	2025	Bad Bunny	La 8va Maravilla – Arcángel	Tropicoqueta – Karol G	"DTMF" – Bad Bunny	La Perversa and Daddy Yankee (3)	Vivo Beach Club	

== Categories ==
Musical works not restricted by genre, gender or other criteria are nominated in the Artist, Song, Collaboration, Remix, Producer, Songwriter, and Video of the Year categories. The Album of the Year category was split into male and female since the second edition of the awards. Most categories are restricted by genre, gender and nationality. Special awards are given to recognize careers and humanitarian efforts. Recipients of special awards include Daddy Yankee, Nicky Jam, Puerto Rican duo Wisin & Yandel, Colombian singer Sebastián Yatra, Puerto Rican soloists Farruko, Arcángel, De La Ghetto and Tito El Bambino and American salsa singer Victor Manuelle.

== Special awards ==
Icon Award

- 2020: Ozuna
- 2020: Sebastián Yatra
- 2020: Wisin & Yandel

Trajectory Award

- 2020: Farruko
- 2020: Arcángel
- 2020: De La Ghetto

Dedication Award

- 2020: Nicky Jam
- 2022: Farruko

Humanitarian Work Award

- 2020: Tito El Bambino

Contribution Award

- 2022: Víctor Manuelle

== Records ==
=== Most wins ===
The record for most Premios Tu Música Urbano won is held by Karol G with 16 awards. The record for most Premios Tu Música Urbano won by a male artist belongs to Daddy Yankee and Ozuna, both with 12 awards. The record for most wins for a duo or group belongs to Wisin & Yandel, who have collected 5 awards.

Rank	Artist	Number of awards
1	Karol G	16
2	Daddy Yankee	12
2	Ozuna	12
3	Becky G	6
3	Farruko	6
3	Natti Natasha	6
4	Anuel AA	5
4	Bad Bunny	5
4	El Alfa	5
4	Feid	5
4	J Balvin	5
4	Wisin & Yandel	5
5	Nicky Jam	4
5	Rauw Alejandro	4
5	Romeo Santos	4
6	CNCO	3
6	Darell	3
6	Eladio Carrión	3
6	María Becerra	3
6	Sebastián Yatra	3

=== Most wins in a single ceremony ===
The record for the most Premios Tu Música Urbano won in a single night is held by Karol G with 9 wins in 2023. Ozuna (in 2019 and 2020), Daddy Yankee (in 2020), and herself (in 2023) follow with 6 awards won in a single night.

- Karol G: 9 (2022)
