= Redimi2 =

Dominican rapper (born 1979)

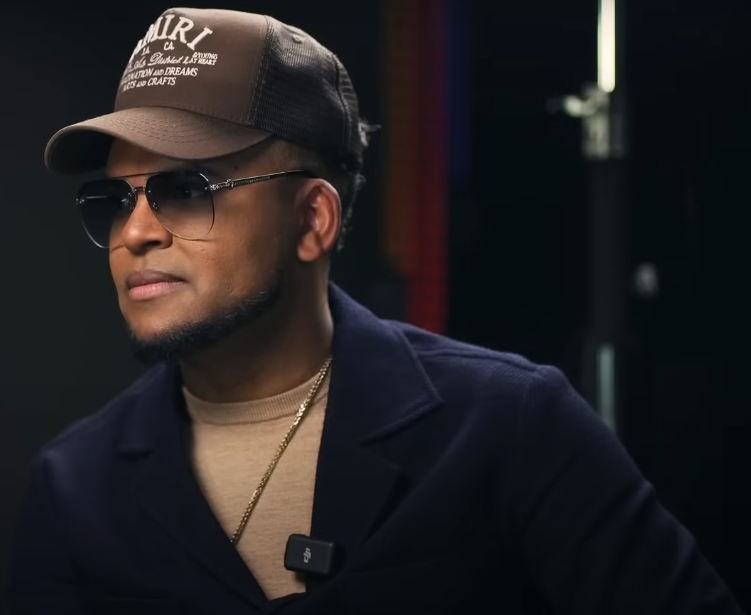

Background information
- Also known as: Redimidos; Redimi2; El Fenómeno; El Exterminador
- Born: Willy González Cruz; June 3, 1979 (age 47); Santo Domingo, Dominican Republic
- Genres: Christian hip-hop; Latin hip-hop; Dominican dumbo; reggaeton; trap
- Occupations: Rapper; songwriter
- Instrument: Vocals
- Years active: 1999–present
- Website: redimi2web.com

Redimi2 (Note: Spanish: [reðiˈmiðo(s)]; lit. 'redeemed.') (born Willy González Cruz; June 3, 1979) is a Dominican Christian music rapper and songwriter.

González began releasing music in 1999 as a part of Redimi2 Squad, with his brother JG. After all members besides González left the group, he took the name Redimi2. His music has been influential in the Christian music scene both nationally and internationally. He is also known as the first rapper to release an album of Christian hip-hop in his country. He has collaborated with Christian singers like Lucía Parker, Annette Moreno, Danny Berrios and Jesús Adrián Romero, and the Puerto Rican rappers Vico C, Funky, Alex Zurdo and Manny Montes. He has been married to Daliza Contreras since 2005 and has a daughter named Samantha González.

He has been nominated in the Contemporary Religious Music category at the Casandra Awards (now the Soberano Awards) for Dove Awards for Spanish Album and Spanish Language Recorded Song, and has twice won the Best Urban Album category at the Arpa Awards.

In 2021, he appeared on the Evan Craft song "Be Alright", with Danny Gokey. The song reached number two on Billboard's Hot Christian Songs chart.

== Discography ==
=== Studio albums ===
- Combinación Mortal (2000)
- Hasta Los Dientes (2004)
- Revolución (2006)
- Phenomenon Edition (2009)
- Exterminador Operación P.R. (2011)
- Exterminador Operación P.R. 100X35 (2012)
- Exterminador Operación R.D. (2012)
- Exterminador Operación Mundial (2014)
- Pura Sal (2017)
- Trapstornadores (2018)
- 20/20 (2020)
- Momentum (2021)
- Rompiendo (2022)
- Maverick (2023)
- Base y Fundamento (2024)
- Épico (2025)
- Oxigeno (2026)

=== Live / special edition albums ===
- Vivo: El Concierto (2008)
- UNO Live(with Funky and Alex Zurdo) (2025)

=== Other discs ===
- El equipo invencible (2007)
- Mas (with Funky) (2013)
- UNO (with Alex Zurdo and Funky) (2021)

=== Mixtape ===
- Rap Redimi2: Las cosas que nunca dije (The Mixtape Vol. 1) (2010)

== Singles ==
- "Combinación Mortal"
- "Raphy Méndez"
  - "Raphy Méndez parte 2"
  - "Raphy Méndez parte 3"
- "5 Micrófonos" (featuring Ariel Kelly and 3C)
- "¿Qué Me Viste?"
- "Déjame Nacer"
- "Omar y Erika" (featuring Isabelle)
- "Yo No Canto Basura"
- "Voy Delante"
- "Qué Futuro Tendrá"
- "Buenas Noticias"
- "Ruge 2.0"
- "Estoy Aquí" (featuring Lucía Parker)
- "7 En El Micrófono" (featuring Manny Montes, Goyo, Alex Zurdo, Michael Pratts, Sugar, Maso)
- "Pao Pao Pao" (featuring Vico C)
- "Ella No Cree En El Amor"
- "Es Con Dios"
- "No Woman Don't Cry"
- "Dominicano Soy"
- "Yo Soy Así" (featuring Funky)
- "Yo Sere Tu Sol" (featuring Tercer Cielo)
- "Fenomenal"
- "Nunca Me Avergonzaré" (featuring Daniela Barroso)
- "Saldrás De Esta" (featuring René González, Lucía Parker)
- "El Nombre de Jesús" (featuring Christine D'Clario)
- "Aleluya Amén"
- "Espíritu Santo" (featuring Barak)
- "Ofensivo y Escandaloso"
- "Tus Pasos" (featuring Ulises de Rescate)
- "Viviré" (featuring Evan Craft)
- "Pura Sal" (featuring Funky, Alex Zurdo)
- "Milagro De Amor" (featuring Joel De Jesus)
- "Un Millón De Razones"
- "Filipenses 1:6" (featuring Almighty)
- "Por Un Like" (featuring Lizzy Parra, Angel Brown)
- "Trapstorno" (featuring Rubinsky RBK, Natan El Profeta, Philippe)
- "Rompiendo" (single version)
- "Harto"
- "Parabellum"
- "El Culpable" (with Alex Zurdo, Funky)
- "MFDT" (with Alex Zurdo, Funky)
- "Colores" (with Alex Zurdo, Funky)

== Awards and nominations ==
=== Arpa Awards ===
- 2013: Más – Best Urban Album (with Funky)
- 2015: "Espíritu Santo" – Best Collaborative Song (with Barak)
- 2022: UNO – Best Urban Album or Track (with Alex Zurdo and Funky)

=== Premios Tu Música Urbano ===
- 2021: "Filipenses 1:6" – Best Christian Song (with Almighty)
