= Manny Montes =

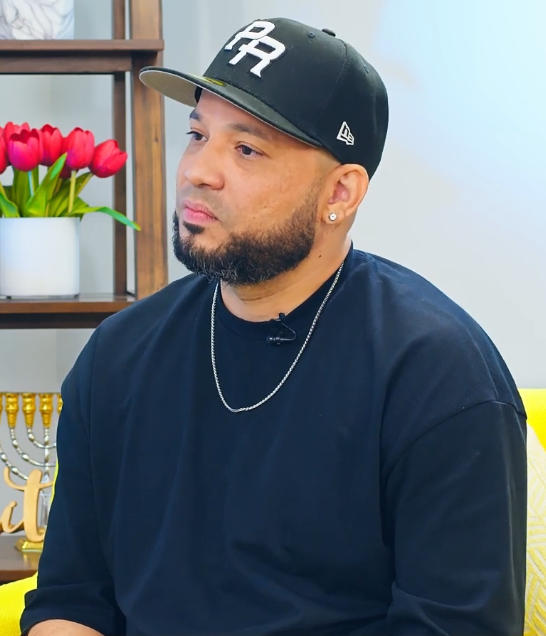
- Manny Montes in 2024

Background information
- Born: Emmanuel Rodríguez; Aguadilla, Puerto Rico
- Genres: Latin Christian; Christian Hip Hop; Christian rap; Reggaeton
- Occupations: Rapper; singer; composer
- Instruments: Vocals
- Years active: 2000-present
- Labels: Funkytown Music; Afueguember Records; El Recinto Music; Manny Montes Music

Emmanuel Rodríguez, better known as Manny Montes, is a Puerto Rican rapper, known one of the major Christian artists in Puerto Rico. He has been nominated multiple times for the Premios Arpa and recently, at the Tu Música Urbana Awards for "Mejor canción cristiana".

He has more than 10 collaborative albums, where hundreds of different artists have participated, including Funky, Redimi2, Alex Zurdo, Indiomar, Farruko, Mexicano 777, etc., sharing the stage with artists like Marcos Witt and Tercer Cielo.

== Musical career ==
=== The beginning (2000-2002) ===
Emmanuel Rodríguez was born in the town of Aguadilla, Puerto Rico. He grew up in the Tamarindo neighborhood, specifically in the Callejón del Fuerte and the La Vía Sector, where he began to compose music from a very young age. He made his first appearances in musical productions in 2000 for the collaborative "PeaceMakers" with the song "No me quito", and in 2001 he collaborated with Double Impact for their debut album "Juventud Despierta" on the song "Más que Vencedores ". In 2002, he released his first solo album called Realidades, under the stage name "Manny Montes", with the singles "La vida que nace de muerte", "Te equivocaste" and "Ricky y Manuel".

=== Manny Montes and United Kingdom (2003-2007) ===
He participated in productions of various exponents of the urban Christian genre, and with the release in 2003 of the collaborative album United Kingdom and United Kingdom: En Vivo in 2004, an important collaboration was achieved with a large number of Christian rappers such as Funky, V.I.P. (Maso El Presidente and El Chal), Triple Seven, Dr. P, Vito and Santito, among others. The recording took place at a large open-air concert in Puerto Rico, United Kingdom: El Concierto.

Montes's fourth album, Los Inmortales, was released in 2006; and it was based on the contributions of some 35 rappers and musicians such as Triple Seven, Vito, Redimi2, Bengie, Dr. P, among others. In this record production, a composition by Manny Montes called "El Inmortal" stands out, considered one of the best songs on the album and in the urban Christian genre.

In 2007, Afueguember Live and Los Violentos were published, in which several Christian rappers like Vito, Dr. P, Redimi2 and Alex Zurdo, among others, collaborated. That same year, together with Funky, they held the Cara a Cara Tour.

By this time, Manny Montes had been invited for various collaborative albums of the Christian industry, such as albums by Funky (Los Vencedores in 2004 and Vida Nueva in 2005), Redimi2 (El Equipo Invencible in 2007), even by non-Christian artists, like Los Bandoleros Reloaded and Chosen Few 2.

=== Nuevo comienzo and El Escenario (2008-2011) ===
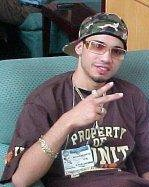
Manny Montes in Germany (2011)

In 2008, on a musical tour in Venezuela, the producer of the Puerto Rican reggaeton concerts, died in a car accident, hours before one of the artist's performances. Faced with the tragedy, rumors circulated on the cybernetics -in the United States, Latin America and Puerto Rico- indicating that "Manny Montes and his DJ were in the accident vehicle," being denied by their public relation Karen Ivelisse Cruz.

"Nuevo Comienzo" in 2008, Los Violentos 2, in 2009, are memorable productions of the exponent, where the songs "Cielo" stand out, together with Juan Carlos Rodríguez from the duo Tercer Cielo, "Mil Razones" in collaboration with Alex and Yenza. El Escenario, the album announced since the beginning of Manny's career finally arrived in 2010, with the singles "Gozo", "Loco por ti" and "Entre Dos Mundos" with the participation of Alex Zurdo and Redimi2. It took Manny seven years to record the album, and he regretted joining "the artists who have been affected by piracy". The album "El Escenario" was the winner of an Arpa Award for "Mejor Álbum Urbano" and was nominated for "Mejor Diseño de Portada" in 2011.

=== Corazón Abierto and United Kingdom 2 and 2.5 (2012-2014) ===
With the production Corazón Abierto, published in 2012, Manny celebrates 10 years of musical career. This includes new versions of his best-known songs, such as "La chica que yo amo" and "Poco a poco", as well as new songs like "De fiesta" with Alex Zurdo, "Mira pal lao" with Sugar Baby and "UK2", a prelude to the United Kingdom 2 album, where Michael Pratts, Musiko, Leo El Poeta, Memo and Ungido participate. He also released "Corazón abierto: Descubre tu proyecto de vida "(in English, "Open Heart: Discover Your Life Project"), a devotional book with 21 chapters with motivational and faith messages. It featured the preface by pastor Otoniel Font, salsa singer Ismael Miranda and Argentine pastor Sergio Belart.

In 2013, with the participation of several rappers such as Michael Pratts, Musiko, Ivan2Filoz, Dwayne, Alwin Vazquez, Indiomar, Baby Nory, Jaydan, among others, "United Kingdom 2: A La Reconquista" was published, an album with 25 songs where it is presented internationally to many new Christian rappers. In the same year, Intrumentales Vol. 1 and Intrumentales Vol. 2 arrives. In addition, Manny Montes plays "Victor", an important role in the movie Reggaeton The Movie along with Natalia Rivera, Jhonny Ou, Che Robotic and Kendo Kaponi, among others. In 2014, he released United Kingdom 2.5 with the participation of Funky, Triple Seven, El Novato, Samally, De La Fe, among others.

=== In the "Línea de Fuego" (2015-2017) ===
Later in 2015, "Línea de Fuego", which had the participation of Michael Pratts, Divino, Farruko, J King, J Quiles, Ken-Y, among others. In this album, the song "Manso pero no menso" is found, which generated controversy with the exponent Christian Ponce, previously called El Sica, for his statements about urban Christian music. In turn, he produced his son's album Sugar Baby entitled "Sugar Free", where he also appeared as an interpreter with the theme "¿Por qué nos maltratan?" (in English, "Why do they mistreat us?"). Likewise, although in 2016, Rodríguez defended Christian urban music again, this time, before statements by Julio Voltio.

In 2017, Manny surprises with a couple of productions with a romantic approach titled Amor Real, distinguished by its two versions, Gold Edition and Platinum Edition, with appearances by Michael Pratts, Indiomar, the group Ekos, Mikey A, Jay Kalyl, Musiko, Baby Nory, among others. Subsequently, he released Amor Real (Remix Edition) EP, with six remixed tracks. That same year, Manny Montes released the first song of Live Session Buenos Aires.

=== Saga "Solo" (2018-actualidad) ===
After a decade of the Funky vs. Manny Montes Cara a Cara Tour, the two exponents make a documentary about what happened, where they also express the need to raise new exponents and support them, just as others did with them. Manny Montes presents Solo Rap in 2018, where the single "Era yo" stands out along with Harold and Elena, who, due to his music video, was considered "Inappropriate" on the YouTube platform. Another single from this album is "Todo Estará Bien" with Ingrid Rosario, with whom she developed an initiative to help children with autism in Puerto Rico who, unfortunately, lost their school due to the passage of Hurricane Maria. The song "Nunca te conocí" also belongs to this album, the same sound work that was nominated for "Best Christian song" at the 2020 Tu Música Urbano Awards.

In 2019, he released Amor Real International Edition, and announced that he was working on his production "Solo Trap Edition". In August 2020, this album was released, and participated in the album of 116 titled Sin Vergüenza, in the single "Donde están (Watcho6)". Then, in 2021 he released "Intervalo", his first EP. He also announced that he will launch "Solo Reggaeton", and that it would have the participation of Triple Seven, Rey Pirín, among others. For God's House of Hip Hop 20/20 Summer Fest, Manny Montes was announced as one of the participating artists.

During this period, Manny Montes collaborated with various artists, such as Harold and Elena, La Reforma, Jaydan, Funky, Daniela Galeano, GabrielRogríguezEMC, Nasion, Mr. Javi, among others.

== Discography ==
=== Studio albums ===
- 2002: Realidades
- 2008: Nuevo comienzo
- 2010: El Escenario
- 2012: Corazón Abierto
- 2015: Línea de Fuego
- 2017: Amor Real (Gold Edition)
- 2017: Amor Real (Platinum Edition)
- 2018: Amor Real Remix Edition EP
- 2018: Solo Rap
- 2019: Amor Real International Edition
- 2020: Solo Trap Edition
- 2021: Intervalo EP
- 2021: Solo Reggaetón

=== Collaborative albums ===
- 2004: United Kingdom
- 2006: Los Inmortales
- 2007: Los Violentos (with Sandy NLB)
- 2009: Los Violentos 2 (with Sandy NLB)
- 2013: United Kingdom 2: A la Reconquista
- 2014: United Kingdom 2.5 International Edition

=== Live albums ===
- 2004: United Kingdom El Concierto
- 2007: Afueguember Live
- 2012: En Vivo

== Filmography ==
Year	Title	Role	Note
2005	Imitadores de Cristo	Delinquent	
2013	Reggaeton The Movie	Víctor	Main role (musical producer)

== Books ==
- 2012: Corazón abierto: Descubre tu proyecto de vida (in English, "Open Heart: Discover Your Life Project")
