= Lizzy Parra =

- Also known as: Lizzy Parra
- Born: Lisbet Margarita Plata Parra; July 22, 1995 (age 30); Santo Domingo, Dominican Republic
- Genres: Christian hip-hop; reggaeton; trap
- Occupations: Singer; songwriter; rapper
- Instrument: Vocals
- Labels: Nain Music (2020-present)

Lisbet Plata Parra, musically known as Lizzy Parra, is a Dominican Christian singer of Latin trap born in Santo Domingo. Her lyrics usually focus on positive messages for society. She has collaborated with artist such as Redimi2, Funky, Manny Montes, Alex Zurdo, and others. She gained fame with the song “Por un like” with Redimi2 and Angel Brown, which gained 13 million views on YouTube. She was nominated and winner in many times in Galardón Awards.

== Career ==
Lizzy is one of the biggest stars in the Dominican trap scene. She studied at the Assemblies of God Biblical Institute and was a youth leader in her congregation from an early age, which gave her the name "La Pastora", as she is also known in the musical field. She began her career in 2010, as part of the urban group "La Asamblea". Three years later she made her solo debut with her first studio album entitled “Esperar en ti”.

On March 11, 2014, together with other new urban ministers, she founded the Team Sobre La Roca, which consisted with the participation of various ministries of urban music in the process of increasing in order to evangelize and disciple in the different neighborhoods of Santo Domingo, apart from promoting the unity, holiness and vision of God for such ministries.

In 2016, she released “Te Reto”, her second album nominated for best urban album at Premios El Galardón. That same year, she received the nomination for Urban Artist of the Year in these important awards, of which she was the winner for two consecutive years.

In 2018 she had a special participation in the album “Trapstornadores” by Redimi2, and has collaborated with other artists such as Funky, Alex Zurdo, Manny Montes, Musiko, among others, also in various musical remixes. Then, she released her version of "La Praxis", titled "La Patora Edition".

In 2020, she released "Hope", album that featured Manny Montes, Funky and Musiko. She participated as an actress in the play "Red de Sangre", this being the winner in the category "Mejor obra teatral" (in English "Best Stage Play") at the El Galardón 2020 awards.

Then, she released "Carácter", promoted with the single "Paz Perfecta" and "Quiébrame". The first one entered on Chart Pop list of Monitor Latino.

== Discography ==
- 2013: Esperar en ti
- 2016: Te Reto
- 2020: Hope
- 2021: Carácter
- 2023: Menos Es Mas

=== EP's ===
- 2019: 95
- 2022: Ekklesia
- 2022: Cielo - with Angel Brown

== Books ==
- 2022: Un Libro Para Cansados
