= Historia de amor =

Greatest hits album by Tercer Cielo
- Released: 2009
- Recorded: 2000–09
- Genre: Christian music, R&B, gospel, Latin pop
- Producer: Juan Carlos Rodríguez; Snider Espinoza; Joseph García

Tercer Cielo chronology
Es navidad (2008)	Historia de amor (2009)	Gente común, sueños extraordinarios (2009)

Historia de amor is the first compilation album of the duet of contemporary Christian music Tercer Cielo. The album was released in 2009 of independent form. The compilation contains songs from all the studio albums of the duet published from 2000 until 2008: En ti (2000), Tercer Cielo (2002), Ahora tengo más (2005), Llueve (2007) and Hollywood (2008).

== Track listing ==
No.	Title	Writer(s)	Producer (s)	Length
1.	"Cuando el primer amor se va"	Juan Carlos Rodríguez y Marcos Yaroide	Rodríguez and Snider Espinoza	4:40
2.	"Ella y él"	Rodríguez	Rodríguez, Espinoza	4:25
3.	"Algo anormal"	Rodríguez	Rodríguez	4:08
4.	"Como en la televisión"	–	–	4:17
5.	"Más de lo que pedí"	Rodríguez, Yaroide	Rodríguez, Espinoza	3:47
6.	"Regalo de Dios"	Rodríguez	Rodríguez	3:35
7.	"Oh nena"	–	–	4:25
8.	"Desde el principio"	Rodríguez	Rodríguez, José "Fono" García	4:28
9.	"Enamorados"	Rodríguez	Rodríguez, García	4:21
10.	"Yo te extrañaré"	Rodríguez	Rodríguez	4:25
11.	"Todavía"	Rodríguez	Rodríguez, García	3:59
12.	"Amor de siempre (with Lilly Goodman) "	–	–	3:27
13.	"El uno para el otro"	Rodríguez	Rodríguez, García	3:07

== Credits ==
- Juan Carlos Rodríguez: Producer, composer, recording, music, voice.
- Evelyn Herrera: Voice.
- Marcos Yaroide: Composer, voice.
- Lilly Goodman: Voice, artist invited
- Joseph García: Producer, recording.
- Snider Espinoza: Producer, recording.
