= Eternamente enamorados =

Greatest hits album by Tercer Cielo
- Released: March 12, 2012 (digital download); March 12, 2012 (CD)
- Recorded: 2006–12: Fe Studio, Chandler, AZ; Fono Sound Studio Phoenix, AZ; Saltmine Studios, Tempe, AZ; The Box Drums Estudio, Miami, FL
- Genre: Christian music; R&B; gospel; Latin pop
- Length: 60:19
- Label: Universal Music Latino; Fé y Obra Music; VeneMusic
- Producer: Juan Carlos Rodríguez; Joseph "Fono" García

Tercer Cielo chronology
Viaje a las estrellas (2011)	Eternamente enamorados (2012)	Lo que el viento me enseñó (2012)

Professional ratings
Review scores
Source	Rating
Amazon.com	5/5 stars
iTunes Store	5/5 stars
AllMusic	4.5/5 stars

Eternamente enamorados is the second compilation album of the Christian music duet Tercer Cielo, released digitally on March 12 of 2012 and in physical format on June 26 of the same year. It is a compilation of all their romantic songs from "Llueve" (2007), "Hollywood" (2008), "Gente común, sueños extraordinarios" (2009) and "Viaje a las estrellas" (2011) and with an unpublished song: "Ser tu héroe" which was included afterwards in their album "Lo que el viento me enseñó" (Spanish for "What the wind taught me") (2012). The album reached the 6th position for the groups sales in iTunes and the song "Desde el principio" originally from the album "Llueve" went up to the second position of the most sold songs of the group second to "Yo te extrañaré".

== Track listing ==
No.	Title	Writer(s)	Producer (s)	Length
1.	"Ser tu héroe"	Juan Carlos Rodríguez	Rodríguez	03:56
2.	"Lindo viaje"	Rodríguez	Rodríguez	04:04
3.	"Regalo de Dios"	Rodríguez	Rodríguez	03:34
4.	"Amor real"	Rodríguez	Rodríguez	04:14
5.	"El poder de un lo siento"	Rodríguez	Rodríguez	03:57
6.	"Enamorados"	Rodríguez	Rodríguez, José "Fono" García	04:20
7.	"Entre tú y yo (Bachata version)"	Rodríguez	Rodríguez	04:09
8.	"No tengas miedo"	Rodríguez	Rodríguez	04:14
9.	"Todavía"	Rodríguez	Rodríguez, García	03:55
10.	"Tu amor es un sueño"	Rodríguez	Rodríguez	03:40
11.	"No importa"	Rodríguez	Rodríguez, García	04:23
12.	"El uno para el otro"	Rodríguez	Rodríguez, García	03:07
13.	"Así es el amor"	Rodríguez	Rodríguez	03:45
14.	"Desde el principio"	Rodríguez	Rodríguez, García	04:37
15.	"Desde el principio (Cumbia version)"	Rodríguez	Rodríguez, García	04:24

== Credits and personnel ==
- Juan Carlos Rodríguez: Producer, composer, mix, recording, piano, guitar, voice
- Evelyn Herrera: executive Producer, voice.
- José "Fono" García: Producer, recording
