= En concierto "Creeré" =

Live album with studio tracks by Tercer Cielo
- Released: June 29, 2010
- Recorded: 2010
- Venue: Coliseum of Puerto Rico
- Genre: Latin pop; Christian music; R&B
- Length: 1:40:22
- Producer: Vene Music; Universal Music Latino

Tercer Cielo chronology
Gente común, sueños extraordinarios (2009)	En concierto "Creeré" (2010)	Viaje a las estrellas (2011)

Professional ratings
Review scores
Source	Rating
AllMusic	4/5 stars
CD Universe	5/5 stars
eBay	5/5 stars

En concierto "Creeré" is the first live album and second DVD of the contemporary Christian latin pop duo Tercer Cielo. It was recorded in 2010 at a concert in the Coliseo de Puerto Rico and was released by Vene Music and Universal Music Latin on 29 June 2010. The album contains live performances of his greatest hits from the year 2007 to 2009.

== Track listing ==
CD/DVD
No.	Title	Writer(s)	Length
1.	"Locos por Jesús"	Juan Carlos Rodríguez, Willy González Cruz	3:40
2.	"Si no estás junto a mí"	Rodríguez	6:13
3.	"Entre tú y yo"	Rodríguez	4:24
4.	"Regalo de Dios"	Rodríguez	5:45
5.	"Eres"	Rodríguez	4:03
6.	"Exagerado amor"	Rodríguez	5:19
7.	"Cada día"	Rodríguez	6:19
8.	"Llueve"	Rodríguez	7:02
9.	"Por fé"	Rodríguez	4:18
10.	"Medley a piano por JC Rodríguez"	Rodríguez	8:05
11.	"Mi último día"	Rodríguez	4:03
12.	"Vuelve a soñar"	Rodríguez	5:16
13.	"No tengas miedo"	Rodríguez	4:15
14.	"Yo te extrañaré (Mariachi version)"	Rodríguez	8:37
15.	"Mi destino"	Rodríguez	4:22
16.	"Música por dentro"	Rodríguez, Lilly Goodman, Evelyn Herrera	5:01
17.	"Latinoamérica"	Rodríguez	6:21
18.	"Creeré"	Rodríguez, R. Kelly	7:04
