= Isabelle (singer) =

Dominican singer (born 1981)

Isabelle Valdéz
- Birth name: Isabelle Valdéz Santana
- Born: August 10, 1981 (age 43); Pimentel, Dominican Republic
- Genres: Christian music
- Occupation: Singer
- Instrument: Vocals
- Years active: 1998–present
- Labels: Christian Zone; Life House Music Group; Fe Y Obra Music; One Music Publishing
- Website: Isabelle Valdéz Oficial (YouTube)

Isabelle Valdéz Santana (born August 10, 1981), better known as Isabelle, is a Dominican singer of Christian music. She is the Christian music singer with the highest number of nominations for the Soberano Awards (nine times): 2007 (when it was still called the Casandra Awards), 2010, 2011, 2013, 2015, 2018, 2019, 2020 and 2021, being the winner in the 2021 edition as "Singer of Christian music".

== Musical career ==
She made her debut on the music scene in 1998, with her first record production Algodón, which made her known as one of the most prominent figures of Christian music in the Dominican Republic.

In 2017, she said in a video that she turned down an offer to join the famous group Camila in an interview conducted on the Famosos Inside program on CDN. The news reached the ears of Mario Domm, leader of the group, who in his official Instagram account denied this publication made by Isabelle. Domm later removed the post after learning that their record label had contacted her, not the group itself.

Isabelle's next album, Tiempos de Cambio, was promoted with the single Por Ti Peleo Yo in 2017, a song authored by Juan Carlos Rodríguez of the duo Tercer Cielo, and Creer En Ti in 2019.

In addition to being nominated for the Soberano Awards, in 2018 she won three statuettes in the El Galardón Awards, recognition of Christian art and communication in the Dominican Republic, as female singer and song of the year for Por ti peleo yo (For you I fought). For her 20-year career in music, she received an award from the "Christian Academy of Art Chroniclers", ACCRA. In 2018, Isabelle brought together great artists of Christian and secular music for a great concert entitled "Aquí Estoy" (in English, "Here I am"), an event held for free at the La Victoria Prison.

=== COVID-19 pandemic ===
In 2020, during the world pandemic period declared by the WHO, Isabelle was very active making social and musical contributions. She started a rescue campaign called "Código SOS" (in English, "SOS Code"), to gather hundreds of people for 24 hours of continuous prayer, as well as a team to offer instant access to food and medical aid. Isabelle also spearheaded a campaign called "Ayuno 7x7", which consisted of seven days of prayer and fasting. She also performed in Haina during the pandemic while the Dominican Navy and other groups provided masks to residents.

On March 31, 2020, Isabelle released the song No me tocará (in English, You will not touch me), a song intended to provide strength to the public in light of the COVID-19 pandemic. She released a duet with Sarah La Profeta in August 2020 entitled No tengo miedo (in English, I am not afraid), intended to provide hope.

== Discography ==
- Algodón (2004)
- Regresará (2005)
- Apóyate de mi (2009)
- El Tiempo Llegó (2011)
- Tiempos de Cambio (2019)

== Collaborations ==
In addition to the release in 2020 with Sarah La Profeta, Isabelle has collaborated over her career with Tercer Cielo, René González, Roberto Orellana, Redimi2, Ariel Kelly, Johan Paulino, 3C, Marcos Yaroide, Jesús Adrián Romero, Samuel Hernández, Dianne de Jesús, Nancy Amancio, Juan Carlos Jarrigan, Jonathan Piña, Grupo Barak, Benju Berroa, and Miguel Núñez Dunkan.

She also participated in the 2021 Kairos week-long revival, performing while food and medicine was distributed in the poorer communities of the Dominican Republic.

== Awards and nominations ==
Both Isablle and Marcos Yaroide were honored for their 20-year careers at the eighth Soberano Awards. Isabelle received the statuette in the overall category of Contemporary Religious Music in 2019. She was recognized by the nineteenth assembly of the Puerto Rican Senate as having the most national and international accolades of any female Dominican Contemporary Christian singer.

She has been nominated several times for Arpa Awards in Mexico, for Best Album and Best Singer. She received Unción Awards in Costa Rica for the categories for Best Album, Best Singer, and Best Song. Her album, Apóyate En Mí, won awards for both Best Album and Best Singer in Panama. She also received those awards in Curaçao.

Isabelle was honored at the first annual Christian Redemption Awards in New York City in recognition of her then-25-year career.
