= Red TV =

Red TV may refer to:

- REDTV (Online TV channel)
- Red TV (British TV channel), a defunct channel
- Red TV (Colombian TV channel)
- Red TV (Peruvian TV channel)
- Red TV (Serbian TV channel)
- Red Televisión, a Chilean television channel, now named La Red
- Red (Taylor's Version), 2021 re-recording of Taylor Swift's album Red
