= Yo Canto (TV series) =

- Country of origin: Puerto Rico
- No. of episodes: 14

Production
- Executive producer: Soraya Sanchez
- Production location: Puerto Rico
- Running time: 2 hours

Original release
- Network: Telemundo Puerto Rico (WKAQ)
- Release: 2011 – present

Yo Canto (Spanish for I Sing) is a Puerto Rican singing talent contest that started airing in 2011 on WKAQ-TV, the Telemundo outlet in Puerto Rico. It is produced by Soraya Sánchez, who previously produced the similar show Objetivo Fama, and Beatriz Oliveros. In contrast to Objetivo Fama, Yo Canto features singers from all ages, and contestants can participate as a group or duo.

The show features a group of aspiring singers who compete on a weekly talent show. During each show, contestants are evaluated by a panel judges, and are gradually eliminated until only one prevails. During the time of the show, contestants are "bunkered" in a studio/house where they will live together for several months. The show's first season began airing on February 5, 2011.

The show is hosted by Daniela Droz and Ektor Rivera. The winner of the competition was the Cuban duo FM5.

== Auditions ==
Before the show season starts, auditions are held at several places in Puerto Rico and the United States to pick the finalists that will be featured in the show. These are evaluated by the show's producers. When the final contestants are selected, they are moved to Puerto Rico where the studio/house is located. Auditions were held in New York City, Miami, Florida, and Puerto Rico (Ponce, San Juan, and Mayagüez). On January 29, 2011, a show called Yo Canto: Las Audiciones aired on Telemundo as a preamble to the show.

=== Contestants ===
After the auditions, a group of 18 contestants were selected:

Contestant	Age	Nationality	Hometown	Voted Off
FM5	27/29	Cuban	Miami, Florida	Winner
Jonathan Ríos	22	Puerto Rican	Lares, Puerto Rico	May 14
Favela	21/23	Puerto Rican	Aguada, Puerto Rico	May 14
Yaza	22	Puerto Rican	Naranjito, Puerto Rico	May 14
Abimelec Vélez	23	Puerto Rican	Coamo, Puerto Rico	May 7
Diomary	41	Dominican		May 7
NXO	27/22	Puerto Rican	Ponce, Puerto Rico	May 7
Massiel Nistal	19	Cuban	Miami, Florida	April 30
Yeika	32	Puerto Rican	San Sebastián, Puerto Rico	April 23
Argel	53	Cuban	Miami	April 16
Mari Z	25	Puerto Rican	Carolina, Puerto Rico	April 9
Joaquín Cantilana	62	Chilean	New York City	April 2
Charli	23	Argentine	New York	March 26
Musa	24/29	Puerto Rican	Comerío and Toa Baja, Puerto Rico	March 26
Andrea	19	Ecuadorian	New Jersey	March 19
Tivián	36	Puerto Rican	Arecibo, Puerto Rico	March 12
Franie	22	Puerto Rican	Mayagüez, Puerto Rico	March 5
Moisés	45	Puerto Rican	San Juan, Puerto Rico	February 26

== Weekly Shows ==
During the weekly shows, each contestant performs the song they had received and rehearsed during the week. After each presentation, each contestant is evaluated by the panel of judges, who assign a score from 1 to 10. At the end of the show, the host announce which contestants have the lowest points. Viewers then have one week to call and "save" their favorite contestant.

Two additional shows (Yo Canto Extra and Yo Canto Backstage) follows the contestants during their week of rehearsal, and their reactions after each show.

== Judges ==
- Roberto Sueiro, a Puerto Rican artist and entertainment attorney, who also had a brief singing career. He served as judge of Objetivo Fama during all its seasons (2004–2009).
- Deddie Romero, a Puerto Rican actress, singer, and radio host.
- Manny Manuel, a Puerto Rican singer of merengue with more than 20 years of experience.

== Seasons Synopsis ==
=== Episodes ===
MM	Manny Manuel
DR	Deddie Romero
RS	Roberto Sueiro

==== First night: February 12, 2011 ====
Order	Contestant	Song (original artist when applicable)	MM	DR	RS	Total	Result
1	FM5	"Basta Ya" (Olga Tañón ⋅)	7	10	9	26	TOP
2	Argel	"Por Tí Volaré" (Andrea Bocelli)	8	9	9	26	Safe
3	Diomary	"El Hombre Perfecto"	?	?	?	26	Safe
4	Yeika	"Que Fui Para Tí" (La Quinta Estación)	8	9	9	26	Safe
5	Abimelec	"No Haz Terminado Conmigo" (René González)	7	9	9	25	Safe
6	Joaquín	"Amnesia"	?	?	?	25	Safe
7	Jonathan	"Ya lo sé que tu te vas"	?	?	?	24	Safe
8	Massiel	"Quédate"	8	9	8	24	Safe
9	Tivián	"Loco" (Alejandro Fernández)	?	?	?	24	Safe
10	Yaza	"Estúpida" (La India)	?	?	?	24	Safe
11	Mari Z	"I Have Nothing" (Whitney Houston)	?	?	?	22	Safe
12	Charli	"I Don't Want to Miss a Thing" (Aerosmith)	?	?	?	21	Safe
13	Musa	"Recuérdame" (La Quinta Estación and Marc Anthony)	?	?	?	21	Safe
14	NXO	"La Quiero a Morir" (DLG)	?	?	?	21	Safe
15	Moisés	"Perdóname" (Gilberto Santa Rosa)	?	?	?	19	Safe
16	Franie	"Insensible a Tí" (Alicia Villarreal)	?	?	?	19	Safe
17	Favela	"Aunque Duela Aceptarlo" (Noel Schajris)	?	?	?	17	Bottom 2
18	Andrea	"Equivocada" (Thalía)	?	?	?	16	Bottom 2

Reggaeton duo RKM & Ken-Y were the guest artists of the night. Initially, there was an error in the vote tally that had Franie and Andrea as the Bottom 2 contestants. After the show, the producers made the correction which ended with Favela and Andrea in the bottom instead.

==== Second night: February 19, 2011 ====
Order	Contestant	Song (original artist when applicable)	MM	DR	RS	Total	Result
1	FM5	"Stand by Me" (Ben E. King)	10	10	10	30	TOP
2	Yaza	"Tu Peor Error" (La Quinta Estación)	9	9	10	28	Safe
3	Massiel	"Devuélveme la Vida" (Antonio Orozco)	9	9	9	27	Safe
4	NXO	"Mi Princesa" (David Bisbal)	9	7	10	26	Safe
5	Tivián	"Desde Cuándo" (Alejandro Sanz)	8	9	9	26	Safe
6	Diomary	"All by Myself" (Celine Dion)	8	8	9	25	Safe
7	Yeika	"Mi Reflejo" (Christina Aguilera)	9	8	8	25	Safe
8	Argel	"A Puro Dolor" (Son by Four)	7	9	8	24	Safe
9	Abimelec	"¿Y Como es El?" (José Luis Perales)	7	7	8	22	Safe
10	Andrea	"Todos Me Miran" (Gloria Trevi)	8	6	8	22	Safe
11	Jonathan	"Por una Mujer" (Luis Fonsi)	7	7	8	22	Safe
12	Joaquín	"El Reloj" (Luis Miguel)	7	8	8	21	Safe
13	Mari Z	"Víveme" (Laura Pausini)	6	9	6	21	Safe
14	Favela	"Aléjate de mi" (Camila)	7	8	8	21	Safe
15	Musa	"Llegaste Tú" (Jesse & Joy)	8	8	7	21	Safe
16	Franie	"Fantasma"	?	?	?	20^{1}	Safe
17	Charli	"No" (Shakira)	?	?	?	20	Bottom 2
18	Moisés	"Me has Echado al Olvido" (José Feliciano)	?	?	?	17	Bottom 2

Due to a tie between Franie and Charlie, the judges had to decide which one to save. They chose Franie. Also, due to last week's error in the tally, the audience was asked to vote if they wanted to skip the elimination process for this night. 85.5% voted not to eliminate anyone.

==== Third night: February 26, 2011 ====
Order	Contestant	Song (original artist when applicable)	MM	DR	RS	Total	Result
1	Diomary	"Lo siento, mi Amor" (Rocío Jurado)	9	10	10	29	TOP
2	Charli	"Herida" (Myriam Hernández)	9	9	10	28	Saved
3	Jonathan	"Te Amo" (Franco De Vita)	9	9	10	28	Safe
4	Argel	"Lo que un día fue, no será" (José José)	9	9	9	27	Safe
5	Moisés	"Fabricando Fantasías" (Tito Nieves)	9	10	8	27	Eliminated
6	Yeika	"Mi Mayor Venganza" (La India)	10	9	8	27	Safe
7	Yaza	"Para Volver a Amar" (Kany García)	9	9	9	27	Safe
8	Abimelec	"Por Siempre" (Glenn Monroig)	9	8	9	26	Safe
9	FM5	"El Último Adiós" (Paulina Rubio)	8	9	8	25	Safe
10	Joaquín	"La Puerta" (Luis Miguel)	8	8	9	25	Safe
11	Musa	"Déjame Llorar" (Ricardo Montaner)	8	8	9	25	Safe
12	Favela	"More Than Words" (Extreme)	7	8	9	24	Safe
13	Massiel	"Y Hubo Alguien" (Marc Anthony)	8	7	8	23	Safe
14	NXO	"Y, ¿Si Fuera Ella?" (Alejandro Sanz)	8	8	7	23	Safe
15	Andrea	"Como Han Pasado los Años" (Rocío Dúrcal)	7	8	8	23	Safe
16	Mari Z	"Loca" (Shakira)	7	9	7	23	Safe
17	Franie	"Bring Me to Life" (Evanescence)	6	6	6	18	Bottom 2
18	Tivián	"Dile al amor" (Aventura)	2	3	4	9	Bottom 2

53% of the audience voted to save Charli, instead of Moisés. Also, the reggaeton duo, Dyland & Lenny, were the special guests of the night.

==== Fourth night: March 5, 2011 ====
Order	Contestant	Song (original artist when applicable)	MM	DR	RS	Total	Result
1	Yeika	"Angel"	10	10	10	30	TOP
2	Argel	"Te Quiero, Te Quiero" (Nino Bravo)	?	?	?	29	Safe
3	Joaquín	"De Que Manera Te Olvido" (Vicente Fernández)	9	10	10	29	Safe
4	FM5	"Hasta Que Me Olvides" (Luis Miguel)	10	10	8	28	Safe
5	Massiel	"Oye" (Beyoncé)	9	10	9	28	Safe
6	Abimelec	"Yo No Se Mañana" (Luis Enrique)	9	9	8	26	Safe
7	Mari Z	"No One" (Alicia Keys)	9	9	8	26	Safe
8	Favela	"Un Beso" (Aventura)	9	8	8	25	Safe
9	Jonathan	"Amor de una Noche" (N'Klabe)	9	8	8	25	Safe
10	NXO	"Así Como Hoy" (Marc Anthony)	9	9	7	25	Safe
11	Yaza	"Sin Querer" (Ednita Nazario)	8	8	8	24	Safe
12	Andrea	"El Me Mintió" (Amanda Miguel)	7	8	7	22	Safe
13	Charli	"Daría" (La Quinta Estación)	8	7	7	22	Safe
14	Diomary	"Como Si No Nos Hubieramos Amado" (Laura Pausini)	8	7	7	22	Safe
15	Franie	"A Que Vuelve" (Gisselle)	8	7	7	22	Eliminated
16	Musa	"Lo Mejor de Mi Vida Eres Tú" (Ricky Martin)	6	5	6	17	Bottom 2
17	Tivián	"Piel Canela"	7	8	7	22	Bottom 2

52% of the audience voted to save Tivián, instead of Franie. Also, reggaeton singers Gotcho and Jowell, and singer Jencarlos Canela were the guest artists of the night.

==== Fifth night: March 12, 2011 ====
The show was dedicated to Latin American divas like Olga Tañón, Ednita Nazario, Yolandita Monge, Thalía and Gloria Estefan. The show opened with a group of transgender artists imitating the divas.

Order	Contestant	Song (original artist when applicable)	MM	DR	RS	Total	Result
1	Abimelec	"El Privilegio de Dar" (Ednita Nazario)	10	10	10	30	TOP
2	Jonathan	"Lo Que Son Las Cosas" (Ednita Nazario)	10	10	10	30	TOP
3	NXO	"Sobreviviré" (Yolandita Monge)	10	10	10	30	TOP
4	Tivián	"Una y Otra Vez" (Ednita Nazario)	10	10	10	30	Eliminated
5	Diomary	"El Amor" (Yolandita Monge)	9	10	9	28	Safe
6	FM5	"Como Olvidar" (Olga Tañon)	?	?	?	28	Safe
7	Argel	"Mi Tierra" (Gloria Estefan)	8	9	9	26	Safe
8	Joaquín	"Con los Años que me Quedan" (Gloria Estefan)	10	7	9	26	Safe
9	Yeika	"Débil" (Yolandita Monge)	9	9	8	26	Safe
10	Musa	"El Dolor de tu Presencia" (Ednita Nazario)	9	8	8	25	Saved
11	Charli	"Desilusióname" (Olga Tañon)	8	8	8	24	Safe
12	Mari Z	"Cantaré" (Yolandita Monge)	8	9	7	24	Safe
13	Yaza	"No Me Enseñaste" (Thalía)	8	8	8	24	Safe
14	Massiel	"Entre el Mar y una Estrella" (Thalía)	8	7	8	23	Safe
15	Favela	"Tanto Que Te Dí" (Ednita Nazario)	8	6	7	21	Bottom 2
16	Andrea	"Así es la Vida" (Olga Tañon)	5	4	6	15	Bottom 2

Guest artists were reggaeton singers JKing & Maximan. Musa and Tivián were the contestants "threatened" last week. 65% of the audience voted to save Musa.

==== Sixth night: March 19, 2011 ====
Judge Manny Manuel was absent from this show due to previous obligations. Guest singer Gloria Trevi replaced him as guest judge.

Order	Contestant	Song (original artist when applicable)	GT	DR	RS	Total	Result
1	Diomary	"Mala" (Iris & Franklin)	10	10	10	30	TOP
2	Massiel	"And I Am Telling You" (Jennifer Hudson)	10	10	10	30	TOP
3	Favela	"Mar Adentro" (Tommy Torres)	?	?	?	29	Saved
4	Jonathan	"Algo de Mí" (Ricardo Montaner)	?	?	?	29	Safe
5	Mari Z	"La Gata Bajo la Lluvia" (Rocío Dúrcal)	?	?	?	29	Safe
6	Yeika	"No Podrás" (Olga Tañon)	?	?	?	28	Safe
7	FM5	"La Despedida" (Daddy Yankee)	?	?	?	28	Safe
8	Abimelec	"Como Yo te Amé"	?	?	?	28	Safe
9	Andrea	"Me Muero" (La Quinta Estación)	?	?	?	27	Eliminated
10	Joaquín	"Volver" (Carlos Gardel)	?	?	?	27	Safe
11	NXO	"Tu Como Estás" (Domingo Quiñones)	?	?	?	27	Safe
12	Argel	"Tu Ni Te Imaginas" (Basilio)	?	?	?	26	Safe
13	Charli	"Inocente Pobre Amiga" (Lupita D'Alessio)	?	?	?	25	Bottom 3
14	Yaza	"La Vida es Así" (Ivy Queen)	?	?	?	24	Bottom 3
15	Musa	"Por Amarte Así" (Cristian Castro)	?	?	?	23	Bottom 3

Favela and Andrea were the contestants "threatened" last week. 91% of the audience voted to save Favela.

==== Seventh night: March 26, 2011 ====
During the opening, the contestants sang Ricky Martin's "Livin' la Vida Loca".

Order	Contestant	Song (original artist when applicable)	MM	DR	RS	Total	Result
1	Diomary	"Evidencias" (Ana Gabriel)	10	10	10	30	TOP
2	NXO	"Vivo por Ella" (Andrea Bocelli and Marta Sanchez)	10	10	10	30	TOP
3	Yeika	"Héroe" (Mariah Carey)	10	10	10	30	TOP
4	FM5	"Penélope" (Diego Torres)	?	?	?	29	Safe
5	Jonathan	"Cálido y Frío" (Franco De Vita)	?	?	?	29	Safe
6	Abimelec	"Vida" (Marcos Llunas)	?	?	?	27	Safe
7	Argel	"Vida Loca" (Francisco Céspedes)	?	?	?	27	Safe
8	Massiel	"Si Tu No Estas Aquí" (Rosana)	?	?	?	27	Safe
9	Favela	"Amor Narcótico" (Chichi Peralta)	?	?	?	26	Safe
10	Yaza	"Inevitable" (Shakira)	?	?	?	26	Saved
11	Charli	"Con los Ojos Cerrados" (Gloria Trevi)	?	?	?	24	Eliminated
12	Musa	"No Me Ames" (Jennifer Lopez and Marc Anthony)	?	?	?	23	Eliminated
13	Joaquín	"Aparentemente" (Tony Vega)	?	?	?	22	Bottom 2
14	Mari Z	"Ese Hombre" (La India)	?	?	?	22	Bottom 2

Juan Vélez, winner of the fourth season of Objetivo Fama, and brother of Abimelec, was the guest singer. Charli, Musa, and Yaza were the contestants "threatened" last week. 58% of the audience voted to save Yaza, while Charli and Musa received 19% and 23% of the votes.

==== Eight night: April 2, 2011 ====
Order	Contestant	Song (original artist when applicable)	MM	DR	RS	Total	Result
1	NXO	"A Quien Quiero Mentirle" (Marc Anthony)	10	10	10	30	TOP
2	Abimelec	"La Nave del Olvido" (José José)	?	?	?	29	Safe
3	Joaquín	"Echame a Mi la Culpa" (Javier Solís)	?	?	?	29	Eliminated
4	Diomary	"Amor Eterno"	?	?	?	27	Safe
5	Yeika	"Vengada" (Ednita Nazario)	?	?	?	27	Safe
6	Jonathan	"Esclavo de sus Besos" (David Bisbal)	9	8	9	26	Safe
7	Argel	"Llorarás" (Oscar D'León)	?	?	?	25	Safe
8	Yaza	"Divino Amor" (PortoLatino)	?	?	?	25	Safe
9	FM5	"No me doy por vencido" (Luis Fonsi)	?	?	?	24	Safe
10	Massiel	"Porque me Amaste" (Milly Quezada)	?	?	?	22	Safe
11	Favela	"Cuando Me Enamoro" (Enrique Iglesias and Juan Luis Guerra)	?	?	?	21	Safe
12	Mari Z	"Whine Up" (Kat DeLuna)	?	?	?	20	Saved

The guest artists of the night were pop-rock singer Sie7e and reggaeton duo Alexis & Fido. The contestants that were "threatened" last week were Joaquín and Mari Z. 61% of the audience voted to save Mari Z.

==== Ninth night: April 9, 2011 ====
The night was dedicated to music from popular films. The contestants opened with a dancing number from Grease.

Order	Contestant	Song (original artist when applicable)	Film	MM	DR	RS	Total	Result
1	Jonathan	"Kiss from a Rose" (Seal)	Batman Forever	10	10	10	30	TOP
2	FM5	"No Importa la Distancia" (Ricky Martin)	Hercules	10	10	10	30	Safe
3	Massiel	"Over the Rainbow" (Judy Garland)	The Wizard of Oz	?	?	?	29	Safe
4	Yeika	"I Will Always Love You" (Whitney Houston)	The Bodyguard	?	?	?	29	Safe
5	Abimelec	"Sueña" (Luis Miguel)	The Hunchback of Notre Dame	?	?	?	27	Safe
6	Diomary	"My Heart Will Go On" (Celine Dion)	Titanic	?	?	?	27	Safe
7	Argel	"Quiero Seguir Amándote"		?	?	?	26	Saved
8	NXO	"Sexo, Pudor y Lágrimas" (Aleks Syntek)	Sexo, Pudor y Lágrimas	?	?	?	26	Safe
9	Yaza	"Todo lo Que Soy" (Bryan Adams)	Robin Hood: Prince of Thieves	?	?	?	26	Safe
10	Mari Z	"Si Una Vez" (Selena)	Selena	?	?	?	26	Eliminated
11	Favela	"Un Mundo Ideal" (Ricardo Montaner)	Aladdin	?	?	?	25	Safe

The guest artist of the night was Carlos Baute, who sang a song with Massiel. The contestants with fewest votes were Argel and Mari Z. The judges decided to save Argel.

==== Tenth night: April 16, 2011 ====
Order	Contestant	Song (original artist when applicable)	MM	DR	RS	Total	Result
1	FM5	"Mientes" (Camila)	9	10	10	29	Safe
2	Diomary	"Amame Una Vez Más" (Amanda Miguel)	?	?	?	29	Safe
3	NXO	"Suelta Mi Mano" (Sin Bandera)	?	?	?	29	Safe
4	Yeika	"Fuera de mi Vida" (Valeria Lynch)	?	?	?	29	Safe
5	Yaza	"Si tu Eres Mi Hombre" (La India)	?	?	?	28	Safe
6	Jonathan	"Yo Si Me Enamoré" (Huey Dunbar)	8	10	9	27	Safe
7	Massiel	"Hoy Tengo Ganas de Tí" (Miguel Gallardo)	?	?	?	27	Safe
8	Abimelec	"Tu Amor Me Hace Bien" (Marc Anthony)	?	?	?	26	Safe
9	Argel	"Cartas Amarillas" (Nino Bravo)	?	?	?	25	Eliminated
10	Favela	"Yo Te Voy a Amar" ('N Sync)	7	7	8	22	Safe

The contestants also had a chance to sing in groups. Males, females, and duets were paired with each other to sing an additional song. Abimelec, who was suspended for the week, couldn't sing with males Jonathan and Argel.

Order	Contestant	Song (original artist when applicable)
1	FM5	"Show Me the Meaning of Being Lonely" (Backstreet Boys)
1	Favela	"Show Me the Meaning of Being Lonely" (Backstreet Boys)
1	NXO	"Show Me the Meaning of Being Lonely" (Backstreet Boys)
2	Diomary	"Si Yo Fuera Un Chico" (Beyoncé)
2	Massiel	"Si Yo Fuera Un Chico" (Beyoncé)
2	Yaza	"Si Yo Fuera Un Chico" (Beyoncé)
2	Yeika	"Si Yo Fuera Un Chico" (Beyoncé)
3	Argel	"El Amor de Mi Vida" (Pablo Milanés)
3	Jonathan	"El Amor de Mi Vida" (Pablo Milanés)

Antonio Orozco and the a cappella group Nota were the guest artists. The contestants with fewest votes were Cubans Argel and Massiel. The judges decided to save Massiel.

==== Eleventh night: April 23, 2011 ====
Due to the celebration of Holy Week, all the performances of the show were of spiritual or religious songs. The contestants opened the show singing "Creeré" of Christian duo Tercer Cielo.

Order	Contestant	Song (original artist when applicable)	MM	DR	RS	Total	Result
1	FM5	"Imagine" (John Lennon)	10	10	10	30	Safe
2	Abimelec	"El Privilegio de Amar" (Manuel Mijares)	?	?	?	29	Safe
3	Jonathan	"Todo se lo Debo a El" (Marcos Yaroide)	10	9	10	29	Safe
4	Massiel	"Un Largo Viaje" (Marcela Gándara)	?	?	?	28	Safe
5	NXO	"Yo te Extrañare" (Tercer Cielo)	?	?	?	28	Safe
6	Diomary	"¿Y tu Cómo Estás?" (Yuri)	?	?	?	27	Saved
7	Yaza	"Llegar a Ti" (Jaci Velasquez)	?	?	?	27	Safe
8	Favela	"Juan en la Ciudad" (Richie Ray & Bobby Cruz)	?	?	?	27	Safe
9	Yeika	"Contigo o Sin Tí" (Olga Tañon)	?	?	?	27	Eliminated

Also, some contestants had a chance to sing an additional song with a special guest.

Order	Contestant	Song (original artist when applicable)
1	FM5	"Quiero Alcanzarte" (with Lourdes Toledo)
2	Jonathan	"La Gloria de Dios" (with Noemí Luz)
3	Yeika	"Que te Ama" (with Perucho)

In the end, the contestants with fewest votes were Diomary and Yeika. After much deliberation, the judges decided to save Diomary.

==== Twelfth night: April 30, 2011 ====
The show was dedicated to 80s music. All the contestants sang in the opening which featured songs like "Súbete a Mi Moto", "Mi Banda Toca Rock", and "A Volar", from 80s boyband Menudo.

Order	Contestant	Song (original artist when applicable)	MM	DR	RS	Total	Result
1	FM5	"Se Me Sigue Olvidando" (Marc Anthony)	10	10	10	30	Safe
2	Jonathan	"Mi Mundo" (Luis Enrique)	10	10	10	30	Safe
3	NXO	"Un Buen Perdedor" (Franco De Vita)	10	10	10	30	Saved
4	Diomary	"Volvió Juanita" (Milly Quezada)	9	10	9	28	Safe
5	Yaza	"No Digas Nada" (RBD)	10	9	9	28	Safe
6	Abimelec	"Pero Lo Dudo" (José José)	9	9	9	27	Safe
7	Massiel	"Eclipse Total del Amor" (Lissette)	?	?	?	27	Eliminated
8	Favela	"Tan Enamorados" (Ricardo Montaner)	8	6	7	21	Safe

The contestants had an opportunity to sing a song with other contestants, although no points were given.

Order	Contestant	Song (original artist when applicable)
1	FM5	"Ese Hombre" (La India)
1	Massiel	"Ese Hombre" (La India)
2	NXO	"Este Ritmo se Baila Así" (Chayanne)
2	Jonathan	"Este Ritmo se Baila Así" (Chayanne)
3	Abimelec	"Yo Se Que Volverás" (Luis Miguel)
3	Diomary	"Yo Se Que Volverás" (Luis Miguel)
4	Favela	"Perdóname y Olvídalo" (Rocío Dúrcal and Juan Gabriel)
4	Yaza	"Perdóname y Olvídalo" (Rocío Dúrcal and Juan Gabriel)

Singer Divino was the guest artist of the night. The two contestants with fewest votes were NXO and Massiel. The judges unanimously decided to save NXO.

==== Thirteenth night: May 7, 2011 ====
Order	Contestant	Song (original artist when applicable)	MM	DR	RS	Total	Result
1	FM5	"Tu Ausencia"	10	10	10	30	Safe
2	Jonathan	"Mi Esposa" (Abraham)	10	10	10	30	Safe
3	Favela	"Kilómetros" (Sin Bandera)	10	9	9	28	Safe
4	Yaza	"Sueños Rotos" (La Quinta Estación)	9	10	9	28	Safe
5	Abimelec	"Si Ella Supiera" (Julián)	?	?	?	??	Eliminated
6	Diomary	"A Mi Manera"	10	10	10	30	Eliminated
7	NXO	"Vive Ya" (Andrea Bocelli and Laura Pausini)	9	10	10	29	Eliminated

==== Final night: May 14, 2011 ====
Order	Contestant	Song (original artist when applicable)	Total	Result
1	FM5	"No Me Quiero Enamorar" (Kalimba)	55%	WINNER
2	Jonathan	"Fuera de Este Mundo" (Franco De Vita)	21%	Safe
3	Favela	"Desde Hoy" (Tommy Torres)	13%	Safe
4	Yaza	"Pero Me Acuerdo de Ti" (Christina Aguilera)	11%	Safe

Also, during the presentation each finalist had a special presentation with a guest singer.

Order	Contestant	Song (original artist when applicable)
1	FM5	"Rayando El Sol" (with Manny Manuel)
2	Jonathan	"Se Acabó" (with Ana Isabelle)
3	Favela	"Estoy Enamorado" (with Danny Fornaris)
4	Yaza	"Estoy Enamorada" (with Pedro Capó)

Finally, the two finalists had a chance to sing their own compositions. Jonathan sang "Misterio" and FM5 sang "Ni Una Lágrima". At the end of the show, FM5 was announced as the winner of the competition with 55% of the votes.

=== Elimination chart ===
Week:		2/12	2/19^{1}	2/26	3/5	3/12	3/19	3/26	4/2	4/9	4/16	4/23	4/30	5/7	5/14
Place	Contestant	Result													
1	FM5	Top	Top												Winner
2	Jonathan					Top				Top					Runner-up
3	Favela	Bottom 2				Bottom 2									Elim
4	Yaza						Bottom 3								Elim
5	Abimelec					Top								Elim	
6	Diomary			Top			Top	Top				Bottom 2		Elim	
7	NXO					Top		Top	Top				Bottom 2	Elim	
8	Massiel						Top				Bottom 2		Elim		
9	Yeika				Top			Top				Elim			
10	Argel									Bottom 2	Elim				
11	Mari Z							Bottom 2	Bottom 2	Elim					
12	Joaquín							Bottom 2	Elim						
13	Charli		Bottom 2				Bottom 3	Elim							
14	Musa				Bottom 2		Bottom 3	Elim							
15	Andrea	Bottom 2				Bottom 2	Elim								
16	Tivián			Bottom 2	Bottom 2	Elim									
17	Franie			Bottom 2	Elim										
18	Moisés		Bottom 2	Elim											

^{1} Due to a production error in the vote tally the previous week, the audience was asked to vote if they wanted to skip the elimination process, resulting in no eliminations during the second week.

== Reception ==
During the final weeks of the competition, producer Soraya Sánchez was asked about the show's ratings to which she replied that "they've been good in general" and that they were "in a good path". Sánchez has said that she is looking forward to future seasons of the singing competition show and that this first experience was "a promising start". She also said that the participation in the voting was at "half a million votes".

== See also ==
Similar shows

- Objetivo Fama
- Operación Triunfo
- American Idol
- Pop Idol
- Star Search
- La Academia
- Voces en Función
