= Es navidad =

EP by Tercer Cielo
- Released: November 25, 2008
- Recorded: 2008
- Genre: latin pop; R&B; Christian music; Christmas music
- Length: 26:10 (EP); 43:56 (iTunes version)
- Label: Kasa Producciones; Arroyo

Tercer Cielo chronology
Hollywood (2008)	Es navidad (2008)	Historia de amor (2009)

Professional ratings
Review scores
Source	Rating
Amazon.com	5/5 stars
iTunes	4.5/5 stars
AllMusic	4.5/5 stars
Coveralia	3.5/5 stars

Es navidad is the first EP by reason of holidays of the duet of contemporary Christian music Tercer Cielo. The EP was premiered on 25 November 2008 under label Kasa Productions/Arroyo and a year afterwards on 15 September 2009 it was published digitally on iTunes with the instrumental tracks of each included song.

== Background, production and content ==
After 2 years with the group's new lineup, and seeing that Tercer Cielo was considered one of the best exponents of Christian music in Spanish, the group decided to go back to work on something new and in a more mature style for the Holiday season. Released by record label "Kasa Productions", close to the end of November 2008, Tercer Cielo's first Extend Play is titled "Es navidad", with 4 own songs written by Juan Carlos Rodríguez and two songs of other international authors: "María, ¿sabías qué?" by the composers Mark Lowry and Buddy Greene, and the song "Venid y adoremos" authored by Darrell Crowther. This album is also the group's first and only production of Christmas songs. It marks a departure from previous material in the use of electronic rhythms and acoustic sound effects. Tercer Cielo did not want to end 2008 without launching the disk, although the majority of the year was spent promoting their previous disk Hollywood. The songs "Yo amo la navidad" (I love Christmas) and "Éste es mi año" (This is my year), written by Juan Carlos Rodríguez, were composed with electronic rhythms and acoustic sounds, and "Para niños como yo" (For children like me) was interpreted only by Evelyn. Evelyn and Juan Carlos indicated that they recorded the vocals for the songs in hotels during their trips, using portable recording equipment.

== Track listing ==
No.	Title	Writer(s)	Producer(s)	Length
1.	"Es navidad"	Juan Carlos Rodríguez	Rodríguez	4:11
2.	"Éste es mi año"	Rodríguez	Rodríguez	3:17
3.	"María ¿sabías qué?"	Mark Lowry and Buddy Greene	Rodríguez	3:18
4.	"Para niños como yo"	Rodríguez	Rodríguez	3:27
5.	"Venid y adoremos"	Darrell Crowther	Rodríguez	3:56
6.	"Yo amo la navidad"	Rodríguez	Rodríguez	3:44

iTunes Store bonus track
No.	Title	Writer(s)	Producer(s)	Length
1.	Untitled			3:56
7.	"Es navidad (instrumental)"	Juan Carlos Rodríguez	Rodríguez	4:11
8.	"Éste es mi año (instrumental)"	Rodríguez	Rodríguez	3:17
9.	"María ¿sabías qué? (instrumental)"	Mark Lowry and Buddy Greene	Rodríguez	3:18
10.	"Para niños como yo (instrumental)"	Rodríguez	Rodríguez	3:27
11.	"Venid y adoremos (instrumental)"	Darrell Crowther	Rodríguez
12.	"Yo amo la navidad (instrumental)"	Rodríguez	Rodríguez	3:44
