= Te daré lo mejor =

Live album by Jesus Adrian Romero
- Released: 2004
- Recorded: Live in Tijuana, Baja California, Mexico
- Genre: Gospel and Religious

Te daré lo mejor, recorded live in the city of Tijuana, Baja California, Mexico, is the fifth praise and worship album record by Jesús Adrián Romero. The album was performed in an auditorium with more than 3,000 fans on November 20, 2004.

== Track listing ==
The album consists of the following tracks:

• 01. — "Alzad Oh Puertas" — 04:44 — Jesús Adrian Romero

• 02. — "Te Daré Lo Mejor" — 05:20 — Jesús Adrián Romero

• 03. — "Tú Nos Creaste" — 05:07 — Jesús Adrián Romero, Daniel Fraire

• 04. — No A Nosotros — 04:54 — Jesús Adrián Romero, Daniel Fraire

• 05. Quiero Entender — 06:30 — Jesús Adrián Romero, Mike Rodríguez, Daniel Fraire

• 06. — "Con Brazo Fuerte" — 04:07 — Jesús Adrián Romero

• 07. — "Celebraré Tú Amor" — 04:46 — Jesús Adrián Romero

• 08. — "Te Vengo A Bendecir" — 05:02 — Jesús Adrián Romero, Mike Rodríguez, Daniel Fraire

• 09. — "De Tal Manera" — 06:09 — Misael Jimenez - Soloist: Abel Zavala

• 10. — "Abre Los Cielos" — 06:33 — Jesús Adrián Romero

• 11. — "Un Destello De Tú Gloria" — 05:33 — Jesús Adrián Romero

• 12. — "Tú Estás Aquí" — 05:02 — Jesús Adrián Romero, Mike Rodríguez — Duet With Marcela Gandara

• 13. — "Tú Has Sido Fiel" — 06:59 — Jesús Adrián Romero, Pecos Romero, Mike Rodríguez, Daniel Fraire

• 14. — "Al Estar Ante Tí" — 06:02 — Jesús Adrián Romero, Mike Rodríguez, Daniel Fraire — Soloist: Alejandro Del Bosque

== Playlists ==
The following songs from "Te Daré Lo Mejor" were on the following playlists:

1. Al estar ante Ti at WIGV-LP.
2. Te daré lo mejor at KMRO.
