= Lo que el viento me enseñó =

Studio album by Tercer Cielo
- Released: April 24, 2012
- Recorded: 2011
- Genre: Christian music; latin pop; dancepop
- Length: 53:10
- Label: Kasa Producciones; Universal Music Latino; VeneMusic; Fé y Obra Music; Mucho Fruto
- Producer: Juan Carlos Rodríguez

Tercer Cielo chronology
Viaje a las estrellas (2010)	Lo que el viento me enseñó (2012)	Irreversible (2012)

Singles from Lo que el viento me enseñó
- 1. "No estoy solo" Released: July 2012

Professional ratings
Review scores
Source	Rating
Amazon.com	4/5 stars
iTunes Store	4.8 stars on a 5 point scale
Coveralia	3.5/5 stars
AllMusic	4.5/5 stars

Lo que el viento me enseñó is the eighth studio album by contemporary Christian music duo Tercer Cielo. The album was released digitally on April 24, 2012 was released in physical format to the shops of music, produced and distributed under the record labels Universal Music Latin/Vene Music/Fé y Obra Music/Kasa Productions/Mucho Fruto respectively.

== Track listing ==
All tracks are written by Juan Carlos Rodríguez.

No.	Title	Length
1.	"Celebremos Hoy"	4:13
2.	"Lo Que soy Se Debe a Ti"	4:01
3.	"Victoria"	4:04
4.	"Lo Que Hay Dentro De Ti"	4:18
5.	"Mira lo que Has Hecho"	4:06
6.	"Mi tiempo Llego"	3:23
7.	"Sentirte en mi Alma"	3:57
8.	"No estoy Solo"	3:46
9.	"Demente"	4:21
10.	"Ser tu Heroe"	3:44
11.	"Dame mas de Ti"	4:05
12.	"Amor Inusual"	4:11
13.	"Demente - Mariachi"	4:10

== Personnel ==
- Juan Carlos Rodríguez – mixing, producer, recording, voice
- Evelyn Herrera – voice
- Apolinar – trombone
- Richard Bravo – battery
- José Fléte – trombone
- Rebecca Jefferson – changing room
- Axel Rivera – battery
