= Cuidaré de Ti =

Studio album by Álex Campos
- Released: July 29, 2008
- Recorded: 2007–2008; Audiovisión; Erin Hills; M.V. Records Studios (Bogotá, Colombia); Mondomix (Buenos Aires, Argentina)
- Genre: Latin Christian · Christian rock
- Label: CanZion
- Producer: Álex Campos · Juan Blas Caballero

Álex Campos chronology
| El Sonido del Silencio (2006) | Cuidaré de Ti (2008) | Te Puedo Sentir (2009) |

Cuidaré de Ti (English: I'll Take Care of You) is the fifth studio album of the Colombian Christian singer, Álex Campos, released on July 29, 2008 by CanZion. This album is based mostly on God talking speaking to the listener through songs and giving them hope for a better future. It is a rock type of album, different from his previous albums. This album was nominated for a Latin Grammy Award for Best Christian Album (Spanish Language) and the songs "As the Color of Blood"(Cómo El Color De La Sangre) and "Tell me" (Dímelo), were nominated for Best Music Video and Best Collaboration, respectively in Premios ARPA.

== Track listing ==
All tracks are written by Álex Campos.

| No. | Title | Length |
|---|---|---|
| 1. | "Cómo El Color De La Sangre" | 03:56 |
| 2. | "Junto A Ti" | 03:35 |
| 3. | "Tú Planeta" | 03:30 |
| 4. | "Te Estoy Esperando" | 03:59 |
| 5. | "Yo No Temere" | 03:17 |
| 6. | "Cuidaré De Ti" | 03:59 |
| 7. | "Tú Poeta" | 04:22 |
| 8. | "Tú Amor Y Mi Amor" | 03:21 |
| 9. | "Dímelo" | 03:17 |
| 10. | "Come On" | 03:23 |
| 11. | "Te Quiero" | 03:36 |
| 12. | "Más Que Ayer" | 04:18 |

== Charts ==
| Chart (2008) | Peak position |
|---|---|
| US Top Latin Albums (Billboard) | 48 |
| US Latin Pop Albums (Billboard) | 11 |
| US Christian Albums (Billboard) | 43 |
