= Tercer Cielo (album) =

Studio album by Tercer Cielo
- Released: 2002 CD; August 25, 2009 on iTunes
- Recorded: 2002
- Genre: Christian music; gospel; R&B
- Length: 45:43
- Label: Estribillo Music; Kasa Producciones
- Producer: Juan Carlos Rodríguez; Snider Espinoza

Tercer Cielo chronology
En ti (2000)	Tercer Cielo (2002)	Ahora tengo más (2004)

Singles from Tercer Cielo
- 1. "Cuando el primer amor se va" Released: 2002; 2. "Dios no te olvida" Released: 2002; 3. "Algún día" Released: 2002

Professional ratings
Review scores
Source	Rating
Amazon	5/5 stars

Tercer Cielo or Amor Real is the second studio album of the Dominican Christian music group Tercer Cielo. The album was produced by Juan Carlos Rodríguez and Snider Espinoza, recorded and released in 2002 under the label Estribillo Music, with which they had already worked 2 years ago on their debut album and was distributed by Kasa Producciones. On August 25, 2009, the album was released digitally on iTunes. The group won a Premio AMCL for "Song of the Year" with the song "Contigo estoy".

== Background ==
Tercer Cielo was satisfied after the release of their first album since they had begun their musical career professionally and they were willing to continue to create more songs for more musical productions. They began to create new music with the same purpose of bringing new life message, the songs were written by Juan Carlos and Marcos and arose from personal experiences and experiences of others which motivated him to write. Two years later after their debut album together some songs with a fantastic new combination of sounds totally different from what sounded in Christian music at that time music and innovative arrangements. At first they wanted to name the production "Cuando el primer amor se va" after several name changes since they had thought they looked a little long, abstracted or synthesized only "Tercer Cielo" or in other countries called "Primer Amor"

== Achievements ==
The audience was the record with more than 150,000 copies sold in international locations, with this album they win one Premio AMCL "Song of the Year" in 2003 and positioned as one of the leading groups of Latin Christian music scene that year . The online store Amazon.com gave the album as a five-star rating is the highest rating that can be given, called it perfect and so purchased by the public. The album provoked great tours in Puerto Rico, where they performed in important places and massive concerts with other well-known singers, and managed to fill a concert in the hall of Bellas Artes de Caguas, Puerto Rico; They could reach places like New York City, Boston, Arizona, North Carolina, among other states of America and Latin American countries. They also managed to win as the Paoli Awards for "Best Song of the Year" with the song "Héroe".

== Singles ==
=== Cuando el primer amor se va ===
The first single was "Cuando el primer amor se va", a song that was announced by the international music world, the song made it to the list of the most requested in Christian radio stations in Latin America and United States and managed to sell more than 100,000 copies, distributed mainly in Puerto Rico and the United States, they won awards in Los Angeles for the music video.

=== Dios no te olvida ===
Song released as the second single from the album, which he made a music video in 2002. Occupying the top spot on Christian radio and one of the most requested in the band's concerts. Song written by Juan Carlos Rodríguez and Marcos Yaroide and produced by Snider Espinoza.

=== Algún día ===
This song is one of the most emotional of the group so far as it speaks of hope amid the pain of losing a loved one, nominated for some awards but won with this song again able people to have their attention - a ballad that makes you think and love your loved ones while they are here. Managing to be at the top again.

== Promotional singles ==
=== Agua viva ===
After being released the album, this song quickly was the most requested in the Christian radios of Puerto Rico and Dominican Republic, this song written by Juan Carlos Rodríguez with influences from cumbia and tropical rhythms, reached the top of the counts music in those South American countries, and in the coming years in other countries such as Mexico, Panama and Spain giving the group more popularity and international reputation.

=== Contigo estoy ===
"Contigo estoy" was published as a promotional song on the album in 2002, as it was one of the most popular and favorite people, the song gave the group its first nomination Premios AMCL and winning it in 2003. The song was a blessing and influence to those who heard that talk that God is always at our side when it is most needed and that was the reason why people would draw attention.

=== Héroe ===
Song that won the Premio Paoli for Song of the Year in 2003. It is now considered one of the songs that are still popular after the start of the second stage (exchange integral) duo. A song that left its mark in the hearts of his audience, written by Juan Carlos Rodríguez song.

== Track listing ==
No.	Title	Writer(s)	Producer(s)	Length
1.	"Agua viva"	Juan Carlos Rodríguez	Juan Carlos Rodríguez and Snider Espinoza	3:39
2.	"Algún día"	Juan Carlos Rodríguez and Marcos Yaroide	Juan Carlos Rodríguez and Snider Espinoza	4:08
3.	"Bajo control"	Juan Carlos Rodríguez and Marcos Yaroide	Juan Carlos Rodríguez y Snider Espinoza	4:04
4.	"Contigo estoy"	Juan Carlos Rodríguez and Marcos Yaroide	Juan Carlos Rodríguez and Snider Espinoza	4:40
5.	"Cuando el primer amor se va"	Juan Carlos Rodríguez and Marcos Yaroide	Juan Carlos Rodríguez and Snider Espinoza	4:40
6.	"Dios no te olvida"	Juan Carlos Rodríguez and Marcos Yaroide	Juan Carlos Rodríguez and Snider Espinoza	3:48
7.	"Ella y él"	Juan Carlos Rodríguez	Juan Carlos Rodríguez and Snider Espinoza	4:25
8.	"En el aire (with Redimi2)"	Juan Carlos Rodríguez and Marcos Yaroide	Juan Carlos Rodríguez and Snider Espinoza	3:22
9.	"Hazla volver"	Juan Carlos Rodríguez and Marcos Yaroide	Juan Carlos Rodríguez and Snider Espinoza	4:34
10.	"Héroe"	Juan Carlos Rodríguez	Juan Carlos Rodríguez and Snider Espinoza	3:45
11.	"Más de lo que pedí"	Juan Carlos Rodríguez and Marcos Yaroide	Juan Carlos Rodríguez and Snider Espinoza	3:47

== Awards and nominations ==
Year	Awards	Nomination	Result
2003	Premios AMCL	Song of the Year for "Contigo estoy"	Won
2003	Premios Paoli	Song of the Year for "Héroe"	Won
