= El Brillo De Mis Ojos =

El brillo de mis ojos

Studio album by Jesús Adrián Romero
- Released: March 26, 2010
- Genre: Christian music
- Label: Vástago

Jesús Adrián Romero chronology
Ayer te vi... Fue más claro que la Luna (2007)	El brillo de mis ojos (2010)	Soplando vida (2012)

El brillo de mis ojos (The Brightness of My Eyes) is the third studio album by Mexican Christian music singer Jesús Adrián Romero. The album, which features Dove Award-nominated Spanish Christian singer and songwriter Marcos Vidal on the third track, "Jesús", was released on 26 March 2010 through Vástago Producciones. A special edition of the album was released that same year.

== History ==
Months before the album was released, rumors spread over the internet about the possible recording of a new album by Romero and since then many evidence began to appear on the social media, including the album title and photos.

== Track listing ==
All tracks are written by Jesús Adrián Romero.

No.	Title	Length
1.	"El Brillo De Mis Ojos"	03:31
2.	"Sólo El Eco"	03:29
3.	"Jesús" (With Marcos Vidal)	03:47
4.	"Quizá"	04:07
5.	"Escalera Con Las Nubes"	04:00
6.	"Eres Mí Padre"	03:28
7.	"Crece Más Mí Amor Por Ti"	03:11
8.	"Algo Más"	04:02
9.	"Cerca De Jesús"	03:34
10.	"Sobre Tú Regazo"	03:52
11.	"Leche Y Miel"	03:04
12.	"Tú Bandera"	03:18
