= Ahora tengo más =

Studio album by Tercer Cielo
- Released: 2005
- Recorded: 2004–05
- Genres: Christian music; gospel; R&B
- Length: 55:37
- Labels: Kasa Producciones; Bohuco; Big World Distributors
- Producer: Juan Carlos Rodríguez

Tercer Cielo chronology
Tercer Cielo (2002)	Ahora tengo más (2005)	Inspiraciones del Tercer Cielo I (2005)

Singles from Ahora tengo más
- 1. "Ahora tengo más" Released: 2004; 2. "Hoy te permito odiar" Released: 2004

Ahora tengo más is the third studio album of the Dominican Christian music duo Tercer Cielo, published in 2005 by Kasa Producciones, production work with several well-known artists in South and Central America as Rene González, Roberto Orellana, Isabelle Valdez and Pastor Magdiel Taveras in some songs like "El reyna" and "Santa cena" respectively, songs that managed to be very popular in his country with the song "Santo Domingo" was a dedication to his hometown.

== Singles ==
=== "Ahora tengo más" ===
This song was released as the first single from the album, as it is the main theme of the production, distributed by Big World Distributors / Bohuco became a hit in the Caribbean, South America, and reached places that no She reached their music as Mexico, Europe, north America and others, achieving significant nominations and large concerts in Latin America and the United States.

== Track listing ==
Edición estándar
No.	Title	Writer(s)	Producer(s)	Length
1.	"Ahora tengo más"	-	-	4:10
2.	"Hoy te permito odiar"	-	-	4:26
3.	"Inténtalo"	-	-	4:31
4.	"El reyna (with Rene González, Roberto Orellana and Isabelle Valdez)"	-	-	4:40
5.	"Orar contigo otra vez"	-	-	4:44
6.	"Canta"	-	-	3:55
7.	"Como en la televisión"	-	-	4:17
8.	"Santo Domingo"	-	-	4:13
9.	"Un día mejor"	-	-	4:14
10.	"Vuela águila"	-	-	4:21
11.	"Santa Cena (with Pastor Magdiel Taveras)"	-	-	3:58
12.	"Por fé"	-	-	4:03
13.	"El me diseñó"	-	-	4:04
