= Alex Campos =

Colombian singer (born 1976)

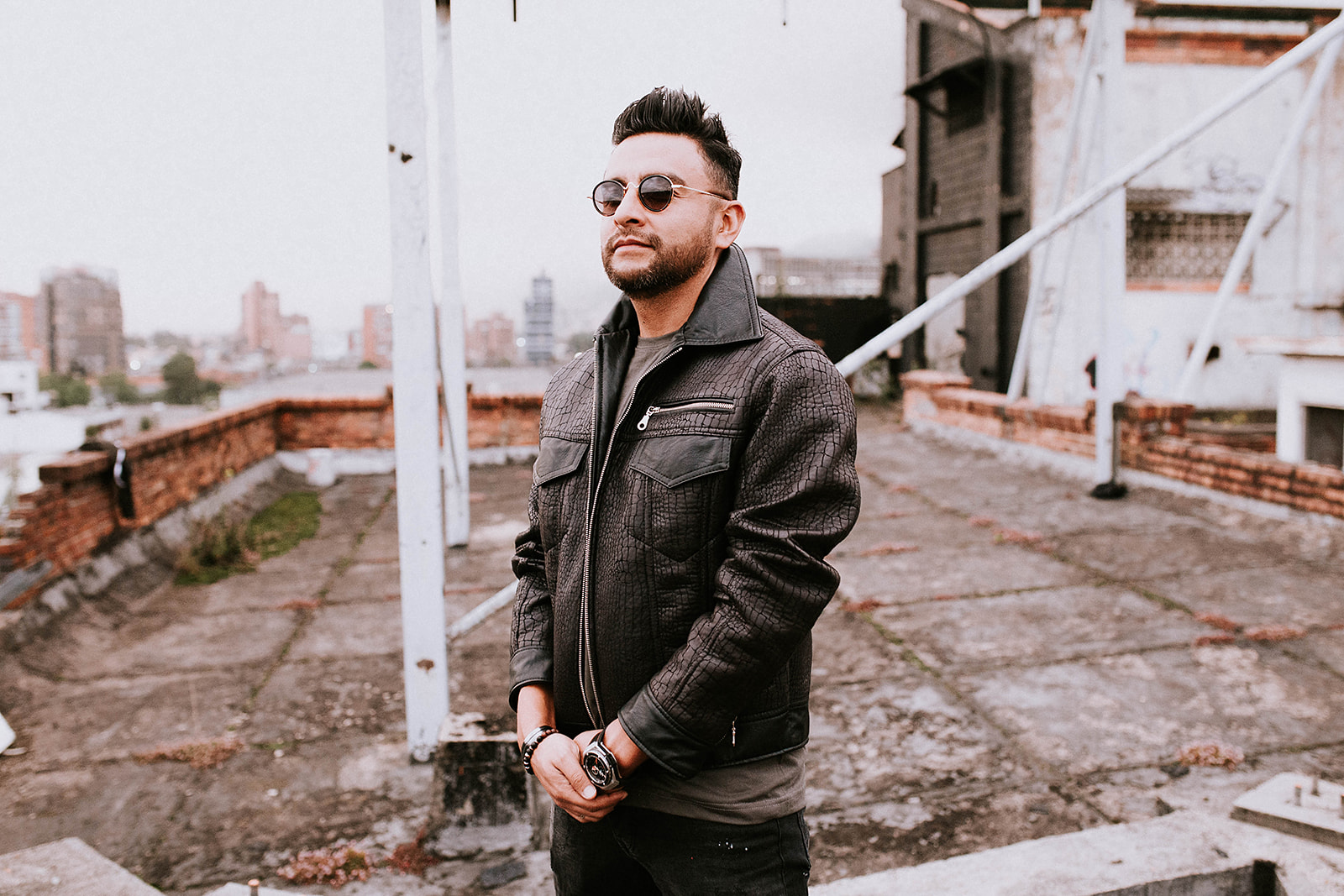
- Alex Campos in 2020

Background information
- Born: Édgar Alexánder Campos Mora; September 10, 1976 (age 50)
- Origin: Bogotá, Colombia
- Genres: Latin Christian; Gospel
- Years active: 1999–present
- Label: CanZion Group LP
- Website: alexcampos.com.co

Édgar Alexánder Campos Mora (born September 10, 1976), better known as Alex Campos, is a Colombian evangelical singer-songwriter.

Campos has won three Latin Grammy Awards for Best Christian Album in Spanish. He has recorded duets with Christian artists such as Marcos Witt, Jesus Adrian Romero, Marcela Gandara, Lilly Goodman, and Jorge Celedon, and the well known David Toledo. He has also produced for other Colombian artists including Fonseca, Sara Borráez and Su Presencia.

== Biography ==
=== Early life ===
Campos, the eldest of four brothers. At the age of twelve, he started attending the local Christian church. At the age of 14, he joined his first musical group, in which he played the recorder.

=== Career ===
Campos formed the group Misión Vida when he was 17 years old. the band consists of Esteban Machuca and Freud Romero

The first was a live recording in Bogotá, Colombia, titled Tiempo de la Cruz (English: Time of the Cross). Soon after, he released a studio album, Al Taller del Maestro (To the Master's Workshop). Campos dedicated this album to God because he believed that God had healed a tumor in his throat. His third album was a live version of Al Taller del Maestro, recorded in Bogotá, Colombia. He followed this with Como un Niño (Like a Child), El Sonido del Silencio (The Sound of Silence) and Cuidaré de Ti (I'll Take Care of You).

On July 18, 2007, Campos and Misión Vida went to Juncos, Puerto Rico, to take part in La Mina Music Fest. He was featured in Jesus Adrian Romero's album Ayer Te Vi... Fue Más Claro Que La Luna, singing a duet with Romero titled "Razones Pa' Vivir", and in David Toledo's album Soldados De Jesús.

Campos performed concerts to promote and raise funds for the organization Misión Child. He became the first Christian singer to sell out a concert at José Miguel Agrelot Coliseum in San Juan, Puerto Rico, with an audience of 12,000. Campos's seventh album, Te Puedo Sentir, was a live concert recording.

He recorded an album titled Lenguaje de Amor which earned his first Latin Grammy win. In 2012, Campos recorded Regreso a Ti. In 2015, he released a live studio session album titled Derroche De Amor.

== Personal life ==
On March 22, 2004, Campos married Natalia Rodríguez. Together they have a daughter and a son.

== Discography ==
Alex Campos discography
- Studio albums: 6
- Live albums: 3

=== Albums ===
==== Studio albums ====
List of albums, with selected chart positions
Title	Album details	Peak chart positions				Certifications
Title	Album details	US Latin	US Latin Pop	US Christ	US Heat	Certifications
Al Taller del Maestro	Released: April 1, 2003; Label: CanZion Group LP; Format: CD	—	—	—	—	ASINCOL: Platinum
Como un Niño	Released: May 20, 2005; Label: CanZion Group LP; Format: CD, digital download	—	—	—	—	
El Sonido del Silencio	Released: October 20, 2006; Label: CanZion Group LP; Format: CD, digital download	—	—	—	—	
Cuidaré de Ti	Released: June 18, 2008; Label: CanZion Group LP; Format: CD, digital download	48	11	43	—	
Lenguaje de Amor	Released: August 4, 2010; Label: CanZion Group LP; Format: CD, digital download	—	14	—	—	
Regreso a Ti	Released: August 7, 2012; Label: CanZion Group LP; Format: CD, digital download	28	8	45	46	
Derroche De Amor	Released: May 28, 2015; Label: MV Records; Format: CD, digital download	36	12	—	—	
Momentos	Released:mar 2017; Label: Sony MUSIC LATIN; Format: CD, digital download	—	—	—	—	
"—" denotes releases that did not chart.

==== Live albums ====
List of albums, with selected details
Title	Album details
Tiempo de la Cruz	Released: March 1, 2001; Label: canZion Group LP; Format: CD/DVD
En Vivo	Released: 2004; Label:CanZion Group LP; Format: CD/DVD
Te Puedo Sentir	Released: November 3, 2009; Label: CanZion Group LP; Format: CD/DVD, digital download

== Awards and nominations ==
=== GMA Dove Awards ===
A Dove Award is an accolade by the Gospel Music Association (GMA) of the United States to recognise outstanding achievement in the Christian music industry. Alex Campos has received one award.

Year	Nominee / work	Award	Result
2013	Hillsong: Global Project Español (as featured artist)	Spanish Album of the Year	Won

=== Latin Grammy Awards ===
A Latin Grammy Award is an accolade by the Latin Academy of Recording Arts & Sciences to recognise outstanding achievement in the music industry. Campos has received three awards from five nominations.

Year	Nominee / work	Award	Result
2008	Cuidaré de Ti	Best Christian Album (Spanish Language)	Nominated
2010	Te Puedo Sentir	Best Christian Album (Spanish Language)	Nominated
2011	Lenguage De Amor	Best Christian Album (Spanish Language)	Won
2013	Regreso A Ti	Best Christian Album (Spanish Language)	Won
2015	Derroche de Amor	Best Christian Album (Spanish Language)	Won

=== Arpa Awards ===
The National Academy of Music and Christian Arts' Arpa Awards are annual accolades to recognise outstanding achievement in the Latin Christian music industry. Alex Campos has received eight awards from thirty nominations.

Year	Nominee / work	Award	Result
2004	Himself	Composer of the Year	Won
2004	Al Taller del Maestro	Best Album for a Group or Duo	Nominated
2004	Al Taller del Maestro	Best Pop/Rock Album	Nominated
2004	Al Taller del Maestro	Album of the Year	Nominated
2006	"Sueño de Morir"	Song of the Year	Won
2006	Como un Niño	Best Masculine Vocal Album	Nominated
2006	Como un Niño	Best Pop/Rock Album	Won
2006	"Sueño de Morir"	Best Music Video	Nominated
2007	"El Sonido del Silencio"	Song of the Year	Nominated
2007	El Sonido del Silencio	Best Masculine Vocal Album	Won
2007	Himself	Producer of the Year	Nominated
2007	El Sonido del Silencio	Best Live Album	Nominated
2009	"Como el Color de la Sangre"	Best Music Video	Nominated
2009	"Dímelo"	Best Collaboration	Nominated
2011	Te Puedo Sentir	Best Masculine Vocal Album	Nominated
2011	Te Puedo Sentir	Best Pop/Rock Album	Won
2011	Te Puedo Sentir	Album of the Year	Nominated
2011	Te Puedo Sentir	Best Long Form Music Video	Nominated
2011	Te Puedo Sentir	Best Live Album	Nominated
2011	Te Puedo Sentir	Best Singer-Songwriter Album	Nominated
2012	Lenguaje de Amor	Best Pop/Rock Album	Nominated
2013	"No Tiene Prisa"	Song of the Year	Nominated
2013	Himself	Composer of the Year	Won
2013	Regreso a Ti	Best Masculine Vocal Album	Nominated
2013	Himself	Producer of the Year	Won
2013	Regreso a Ti	Album of the Year	Nominated
2013	"No Tiene Prisa"	Best Music Video	Won
2013	Regreso a Ti	Best Pop/Fusion Album	Nominated
2013	"Me Amas" (with Lilly Goodman)	Best Collaboration	Nominated
2013	"Suave Voz"	Best Collaboration	Nominated

=== Premios Nuestra Tierra ===
A Premio Nuestra Tierra is an accolade that recognises outstanding achievement in the Colombian music industry. Campos has received one award from one nomination.

Year	Nominee / work	Award	Result
2014	Himself	Best Christian Artist	Won
