= Lilly Goodman =

Dominican singer and songwriter (born 1980)

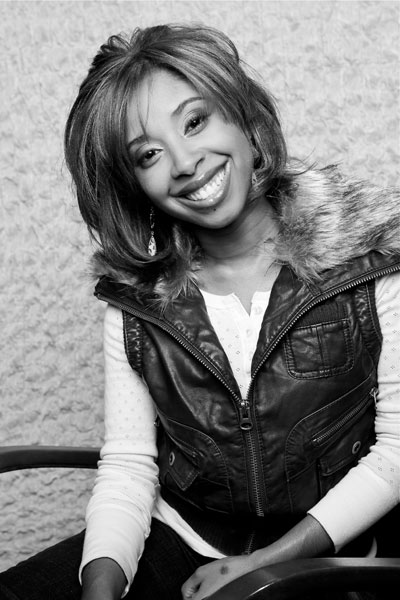
- Born: Liliana Goodman Meregildo; December 19, 1980 (age 45); Santo Domingo, Dominican Republic
- Occupations: Singer; songwriter
- Years active: 2001–present
- Spouse: David M. Hegwood
- Website: lillygoodman.com (in Spanish)

Liliana Goodman Meregildo (born December 19, 1980), known professionally as Lilly Goodman, is a Dominican singer and songwriter. Considered one of the best and most important voices in Christian music. Music has been always a part of her family and she is known for singing Christian-themed songs in Spanish. She has also received numerous nominations and awards over the years, some of which include the Latin Grammy and Cassandra Awards (currently Soberano).

== Early life ==
Goodman was born in Santo Domingo, DR in the 1980 holiday season. She is of Dominican, Cocolo, and British Virgin Islander descent. She attended church where she worked as a Sunday school teacher and later founded and directed her church's worship team. At the same time, she participated in various local and district activities and occasionally recorded singles for radio and television, gaining national recognition. At 17, Goodman decided to begin her studies to earn a Bachelor of Pharmacy degree, but she dropped out to pursue her music career.

== Career ==
In 1999, Goodman began recordings for her debut studio album in Santo Domingo, Dominican Republic, and later was released in 2001 under the title Contigo Dios through Bohuco Music, which included the hit songs "Iglesia", "No importa", "Puede ser" and "Adicta", collaborating with other rising Dominican Christian artists, such as Redimi2 and Juan Carlos Rodríguez, with the latter also producing the album alongside Snider Espinosa. The album and its singles gained popularity among Christian radio stations, outside Dominican Republic, and was galardoned Album of the Year in her home country. In 2002, Goodman joined the record label Vástago Producciones, a company run by Jesús Adrián Romero, resulting in the recording and subsequent release of her second studio album, Vuelve a Casa. Produced by Mike Rodriguez and Daniel Fraire, and recorded in El Paso, Texas, the album included the successful songs "Una vida", "Si puedes creer", "Te necesito más" and "Ven, te necesito", the latter as a duet with Romero. Subsequently after the release of the album, her career took off, and her music achieved significant recognition.

In 2006, Goodman released through Vástago her third studio album, Sobreviviré, once again produced by Juan Carlos Rodríguez, which featured some of her biggest hits, including "Cúbreme", which eventually was covered in Portuguese by Brazilian Christian singer Aline Barros. Other successful songs from that album, included "Sin Dolor", "Alma en Libertad", "El Mismo Dios" and "Mejores Tiempos". Sobreviviré was nominated as Album of the Year at the 2007 Arpa Awards. In 2008, Goodman form with her husband David Hegwood, their own production company, Promesas Producciones, which led to the recording and release of her fourth studio album Sin Miedo a Nada, her final album with Vástago, produced again by Juan Carlos Rodríguez, and included Goodman's signature song and biggest hit, "Al Final". The song was one of the most-watched Christian music videos in YouTube, as of November 2025, it reached over 700 million views on her YouTube account. Other successful songs from the album includes "Yo Sin Ti", "El Equipaje" and the title track. At the 2009 Arpa Awards, "Al Final" won Song of the Year, and Sin Miedo a Nada was nominated for Album of the Year.

During these years, Goodman collaborated with other Christian artists, such as Tercer Cielo on "Música por dentro", Josh Urías on "Haz de mí", and Alex Campos on a live rendition of "Sueño de morir" and the collaborative song "Tu amistad me hace bien". Later, in 2010, to celebrate ten years in the music industry, Goodman released her first compilation album La Compilación, which included re-recorded versions of her greatest hits from her first three albums. In 2013, Goodman released through her own record label Promesas, her fifth studio album Amor Favor Gracia in 2013, which was nominated for Best Spanish Christian Album at the 14th Annual Latin Grammy Awards, but lost to Alex Campos' Regreso a Ti.

In recent years, Goodman released the albums A Viva Voz in 2018, Cielo in 2021, and Me Siento Libre in 2025.

== Personal life ==
Goodman married David Hegwood in 2007 and set up a production company with her husband. She lives in Dallas, Texas with her two children, and is a worship pastor and artist in residence at Gateway Church in nearby Southlake.

== Range and vocal style ==
Goodman is widely regarded as one of the most prominent Gospel artists in Latin America. She is recognized for her powerful vocal abilities, characterized by a broad range, strong bass and treble registers, and commanding timbre.

- Bass Notes: C # 3, D3, E3
- Belts: B4, C5, C # 5, D5, Eb5, E5, F5, G5
- Head voice and falsetto: A5, Bb5, B5, C6, C # 6

== Discography ==
- Contigo Dios (2001)
- Vuelve a Casa (2003)
- Sobreviviré (2006)
- Sin Miedo a Nada (2008)
- Amor Favor Gracia (2013)
- A Viva Voz (2018)
- Cielo (2021)
- Me Siento Libre (2025)

== Features on ==
- Red TV (Colombia) - first year in which featured her singing
- Juicio Final, 2008
- Alex Campos for Regreso A Ti (which won the Latin Grammy Award for "Best Christian Album (Spanish Language)")
- Teoscar Hernandez (Los Angeles Dodgers), 2024 walk-up music
