= Jesús Adrián Romero =

Mexican musician

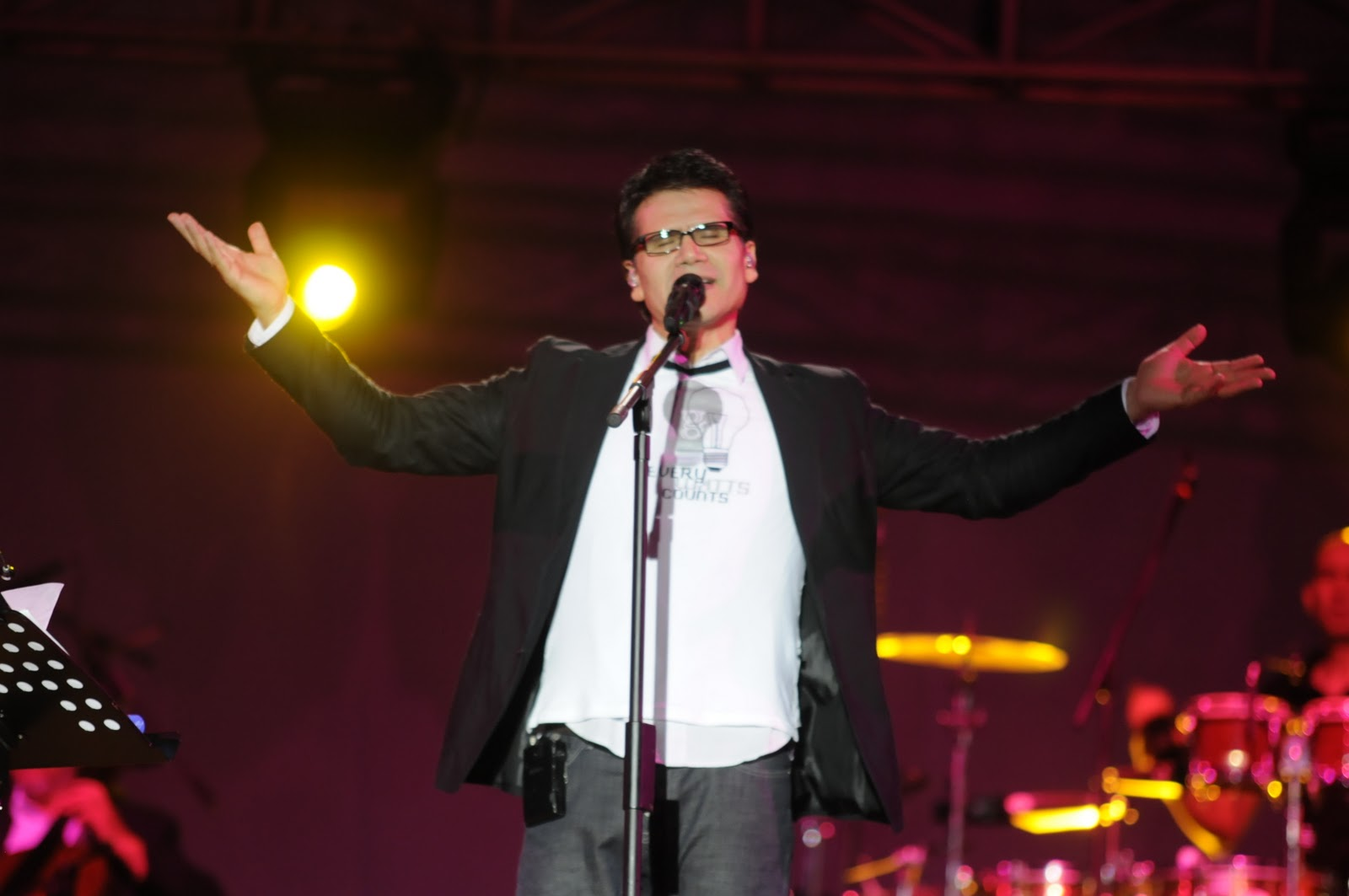

Background information
- Born: Jesús Adrián Romero Ibarra; February 16; Hermosillo, Sonora, Mexico
- Genre: Latin Christian music
- Occupations: Musician; author; singer; pastor
- Instruments: Vocals; guitar; piano
- Years active: 1985–present
- Label: Vástago Producciones
- Website: jaroficial.com

Jesús Adrián Romero Ibarra (born February 16) is a Mexican musician, author and singer from Hermosillo.

Romero is the founder and president of Vástago Producciones, a record label dedicated to the production and distribution of music with a Christian message. Vástago Producciones also organizes and promotes concerts with Latin Christian music.

He currently resides in Monterrey, Mexico.

Throughout his musical career he has won several awards and been nominated for six Latin Grammy Awards.

== Biography ==
Jesús Adrián Romero studied the bible in his course studies, after which he was assigned to be a pastor for a 16-year period. Over a span of three years, he completed his work of spiritual guidance in the congregation of the Church of God, in Van Nuys, California, while also attending seminary.

Later, he founded the Christian community (of a charismatic tendency): "Amistad y Vida" (Friendship and Life) in Agua Prieta, Sonora. Now, Amistad y Vida is under the direction of Pastor Omar Molina. Jesús Adrián was also the assistant pastor in Vino Nuevo in Ciudad Juárez, Chihuahua for four years, under the direction of Pastor Victor Richards, where he oversaw cell groups and directed one of the congregation's worship groups. For three years, he was the director of the worship group De Hombre a Hombre (From Man to Man) and traveled with them across Mexico, directing the congregations' praises "from man to man".

According to Romero, after having prayed for a few years and considering other cities in the United States, Jesús Adrián and Pecos Romero decided that Phoenix, Arizona was the place where God wanted them to start a new congregation and present their music. In August 2007, Jesús Adrián and his family moved to Phoenix, Arizona to check out the city and plan the beginning of Vástago Epicentro (Epicenter Stem). After their move, about 20 families moved from other cities in the United States and Mexico to support them in their vision.

== Discography ==
- "Grupo Creacion" Jesus Adrian Romero – 1989
- Renuevo Espiritual (Spiritual Renewal) – 1990
- Unidos Por La Cruz (United by the Cross) – 1996
- Cerca de Ti (Close to You) – 1998
- Con Manos Vacías (With Empty Hands) – 2000
- A Sus Pies (At His feet) – 2002
- Te Daré Lo Mejor (I Will Give You the Best) – 2004
- Unplugged (Double Disc) – 2005
- El Aire de tu Casa (The Air of Your House) – 2005
- Ayer Te Vi... Fue Mas Claro Que La Luna (Yesterday I Saw You... It Was Clearer Than the Moon) – 2007
- El Brillo De Mis Ojos (The Brightness of My Eyes) – 2010
- El Brillo De Mis Ojos-Edicion Especial (The Brightness of My Eyes-Special Edition) – 2010
- Duetos (Duets) – 2011
- Soplando Vida (Breathing Life) – Album Release › May 2012
- Besos En La Frente (Kisses on the Forehead) – 2016
- Origen y Esencia (Origin and Essence) – 2019
- El Cielo Aún Espera - 2023

=== Compilations ===
- Colección Adoración de Jesús Adrián Romero – Vol. 1 (The Best of Jesús Adrián Romero – Worship Collection) – 2003
- Colección Alabanza de Jesús Adrián Romero – Vol. 1 (The Best of Jesús Adrián Romero – Praise Collection) – 2003
- Colección Adoración 2 de Jesús Adrián Romero (The Best of Worship of Jesús Adrián Romero – Worship Collection 2) – 2006
- Navidad con Vástago (Christmas with Vástago) – 2008
- Colección Duetos (Duets Collection) – 2011

=== Video ===
- Te Daré Lo Mejor – 2004
- Unplugged – 2005
- El Aire De Tu Casa – 2007
- Ayer Te Vi... Fue Mas Claro Que La Luna – 2008
- Soplando Vida – 2012
- Origen Y Esencia - 2019

=== Duets ===
- Alex Campos
- Rocio Cereceres
- Marcela Gándara
- Lilly Goodman
- Orlando Hernandez
- Melissa Romero
- Pecos Romero
- Daniel Santoy
- Marcos Vidal
- Marcos Witt
- Abel Zavala
- Funky & Redimi2
- Jesus Molina

Centro de Alabanza

- Exito Hasta acabar mi Viaje con Rocío – 2012 (DVD)

== Musicians and members ==
Current

- Jesus Molina – piano
- Hoover Ilave – acoustic guitar
- Pedro Marin – bass guitar
- Misael Blanco – drums
- Fernando Ramírez – electric guitar
- Roberto Serrano – percussion
- Eduardo Contreras – sound engineer

Former

- Mike Rodriguez – piano, music director, record producer
- Daniel Fraire – acoustic guitar, record producer
- Kiko Cibrian – electric guitar, record producer
