= Llueve =

Studio album by Tercer Cielo
- Released: April 3, 2007
- Recorded: 2006–07
- Studio: Kasa Producciones
- Genre: Christian music; gospel; R&B; latin pop
- Length: 63:52
- Label: Baltuco; Kasa Producciones; Universal Music Latino; EMI Music Distribution
- Producer: Juan Carlos Rodríguez, José "Fono" García

Tercer Cielo chronology
Inspiraciones del Tercer Cielo II (2006)	Llueve (2007)	Hollywood (2008)

Singles from Tercer Cielo
- 1. ""Eres"" Released: 2007; 2. ""El uno para el otro"" Released: 2007

Professional ratings
Review scores
Source	Rating
Amazon	4/5 stars
CD Universe	4.5/5 stars
iTunes Store	5/5 stars
AllMusic	4.5/5 stars
Coveralia	5/5 stars

Llueve is the name of the fourth studio album by Christian music group Tercer Cielo recently included in that time by husbands Evelyn Herrera and Juan Carlos Rodríguez, was published on April 3, 2007, the expected production for the public due to exchange member and was the most popular first iTunes, winning album several Premios AMCL, the first time they won the Artist of the Year. The album was distributed by Universal Music Latino and Baltuco.

== Background ==
After six years of working with Juan Carlos, Marcos Yaroide decided to leave to start his solo career leaving some songs recorded and ready for upcoming productions; That was when Juan Carlos included his new wife Evelyn Herrera. The style changed to something more mature and fresh, which attracted the attention of young people and those who were already his followers, as the duo to romantic songs and current issues was also dedicated. So with the support of Universal Music Latino engaged in this new production, with original lyrics of Juan Carlos, who also did work production, recording, arranged, and played some of the music. Some songs had already lists by the former member Marcos Yaroide as "Algo anormal", "Espíritu Santo" and "Resucitar" were included on the CD. This album has 16 songs with a more acoustic genre, pop and rock but with the essence of the song always with inspiration. Quickly it published songs reached the most requested of the Christian radios in Latin America and the United States, occupying the first places songs like "Eres", "El uno para el otro", "Sólo por ti" with rapper Manny Montes, "Ese soy yo" and "Enamorados". Tercer Cielo was affected by the change in integrative, his music was consumed by the same fans and gained new of other countries and places never before visited by the duo. In 2007 he began his tour in London and cities in Spain; and his music began to have a lot of radio broadcasting and the Internet.

== Style ==
With the entry of a new member to the group, there were changes in the musical influence they had, leaving her previous albums tropical and cumbia rhythms, and focusing more on the rock and pop, with more current and catchy influences. Allmusic said the rains album was characterized by sounds of celebration, energy, natural, dramatic and trusted by the recipient achieving spread the Latin style of pop and rock in Spanish. In some songs could be heard some reggaeton as "Todavía" and acoustic songs as "Allí todo es luz", "Ese soy yo" and "Resucitar". In the song "Llueve" main theme of the album can be heard arrangements of regional music of northern Mexico as the accordion, guitar and others.

== Cover artwork ==
On the cover of the CD are the two members in a kind of shiny floor where the moonlight shines through, meant that they are in the evening, Juan Carlos holds an electric guitar, dressed in jeans and a black-colored jacket, while his side are taking the previous Evelyn's shoulder, she with a smile and her gaze straight ahead, loose hair, silver and blue jeans blouse.

== Singles ==
=== Eres ===
It was the first single, released in 2007 along with the music video on YouTube, the video was winning Premios AMCL for "Music Video of the Year", the song speaks of the things that God has done for everyone and thanks referring to him as "a friend" and a being who keeps his promises, the song written by Juan Carlos, took the top spot on the charts on Christian radio primarily Puerto Rico, United States, Dominican Republic, Mexico and part from Spain. The music video shows Evelyn on a ladder with a few ornaments in hand suddenly dropped and the track starts theme, Juan Carlos is playing guitar in structures with white pillars and shaded.

=== El uno para el otro ===
In 2007, the music video would be the second single from the album, a song also written by Juan Carlos so far is recognized as the best love song duet, managing to have people interested in the song fans as it is published a of the most popular on the Internet, people to listen to on the radio began to ask more, had better reception than the one he had intended, because not only liked to Christian community, but all in all, the video takes place in a desert with giant rocks in the landscape, also in caves dating from brown to orange.

== Track listing ==
No.	Title	Writer(s)	Producer(s)	Length
1.	"Aquí estás"	Juan Carlos Rodríguez	Rodríguez, José "Fono" García	4:04
2.	"Enamorados"	Rodríguez	Rodríguez, García	4:21
3.	"Eres"	Rodríguez	Rodríguez, García	3:13
4.	"Solo por ti (featuring Manny Montes) "	Rodríguez, Emmanuel Rodríguez	Rodríguez, García	4:24
5.	"Allí todo es luz"	Rodríguez	Rodríguez, García	3:44
6.	"El uno para el otro"	Rodríguez	Rodríguez, García	3:07
7.	"Llueve"	Rodríguez	Rodríguez, García	5:05
8.	"Anormal"	Rodríguez	Rodríguez	4:08
9.	"No importa"	Rodríguez	Rodríguez, García	4:28
10.	"Espíritu Santo (featuring Israel y Moisés) "	Rodríguez	Rodríguez	3:22
11.	"Ese soy yo"	Rodríguez	Rodríguez, García	4:11
12.	"Todavía"	Rodríguez	Rodríguez, García	3:59
13.	"En ti aprendí"	Rodríguez	Rodríguez	3:18
14.	"Resucitar"	Rodríguez	Rodríguez	4:15
15.	"Desde el principio"	Rodríguez	Rodríguez, García	4:43
16.	"Desde el principio (Pop/Cumbia version)"	Rodríguez	Rodríguez, García	4:28

== Credits and personnel ==
- Juan Carlos Rodríguez: Arranger, Song writing, engineer, guitar, keyboards, mastering, mixing, recording, voice.
- Evelyn Herrera: Voice.
- Marcos Yaroide: Voice
- Jacob García: Guest contributor
- José "Fono" García: Producer
- Carlos Parra: Assistant

== Awards ==
Year	Awards	Nomination	Result
2007	Premios AMCL	Artist of the year	Won
2007	Premios AMCL	Song of the Year for "No importa"	Won
2007	Premios AMCL	Album of the Year for Llueve	Won
2007	Premios AMCL	Group/Band of the Year	Won
2007	Premios AMCL	Record of the Year for "No importa"	Won
2007	Premios AMCL	Songwriter of the Year "JUan Carlos"	Won
2007	Premios AMCL	Music video of the Year for "Eres"	Won
2007	Premios AMCL	Sound Quality Album of the Year for "Llueve"	Won
2007	Premios AMCL	Collaboration of the Year for "Solo por ti"	Won
2007	Premios AMCL	Song promotional of the Year for "Enamorados"	Won
