= En ti =

Studio album by Tercer Cielo
- Released: 2000
- Recorded: 2000
- Genre: Christian music; gospel; R&B
- Length: 50:00
- Label: Estribillo Music
- Producer: Juan Carlos Rodríguez

Tercer Cielo chronology
En ti (2000)	Tercer Cielo (2002)

Singles from Tercer Cielo
- 1. "El rapto" Released: 2000; 2. "Ella y él" Released: 2000

En ti is the debut album of Latin Christian music duo Tercer Cielo, the album was recorded between ???? and 2000 with the record label Estribillo Music, an independent Christian label.

== Background ==
Before recording the album, Tercer Cielo only makes presentations to small concerts were invited by some churches. After being in several places at people they began to attract attention and enjoy his music, was when they noticed that little fame was beginning (thanks to the song "Ella y él"), then came the need to record those songs and include them on a CD, that's when they received the support of a Christian label also rookie Estribillo Music with whom they released their first album under the name En ti, the name chosen for one of the songs on the album: "En ti no dejaré de creer" that is the main song. The first songs were recorded were "Ella y él", "El rapto", "En ti no dejaré de creer", "Contigo estoy". And finally in the first half of 2000 they managed to publish his country their first album after almost a year of creating the group. The album contains 10 songs written and co-produced by themselves.

== Singles ==
=== El rapto ===
The first single released was "El rapto" co-written by Radhames Reynoso, the song was recorded between 1999 and 2000 for Tercer Cielo with Redimi2 a rapper who also started at that time. The song caught the attention of people as it speaks of an apocalyptic scene where the guy tells a child crying for his family, friends and acquaintances who were Christians and had gone with Jesus to heaven, leaving a good message to people of repentance, the song is a ballad rhythms under hip hop and rap. The song (and other songs) began months later heard in the local Christian radios of Santo Domingo is the place of origin of the group, and had mixed reviews on the song.

=== Ella y él ===
After they released as the second single success that launched the careers 'Ella y él', written by Juan Carlos Rodríguez, one song ballad influenced by R&B and told of the story of a young woman who abandoned her Christian faith, to go a world that offered her pain and suffering with her boyfriend, soon this song became a hit on the radio in his country and began invitations to concerts and events like never before and managed to enter and occupy positions #1 radio.

== Track listing ==
No.	Title	Writer(s)	Producer(s)	Length
1.	"Intro"	-	-	01:22
2.	"El rapto (with Redimi2)"	-	-	04:41
3.	"Ella y él"	Juan Carlos Rodríguez	Juan Carlos Rodríguez and Snider Espinoza	05:10
4.	"Contigo estoy"	Juan Carlos Rodríguez and Marcos Yaroide	Juan Carlos Rodríguez and Snider Espinoza	04:45
5.	"Oh nena"	-	-	04:28
6.	"Perdóname"	-	-	04:59
7.	"Lleno de ti"	-	-	05:37
8.	"Ministrazo"	-	-	03:43
9.	"No lo sé"	-	-	03:31
10.	"Tu amor"	-	-	05:11
