= Viaje a las estrellas =

Studio album by Tercer Cielo
- Released: April 5, 2011
- Recorded: 2011
- Studio: Bryan Studio, (Dominican Republic); Fé Studio, (Chandler, Arizona)
- Genre: Christian music; latin pop; dancepop
- Length: 48:00
- Label: Kasa Producciones; Universal Music Latino; VeneMusic; Fé y Obra Music; Mucho Fruto
- Producer: Juan Carlos Rodríguez

Tercer Cielo chronology
| En concierto "Creeré" (2010) | Viaje a las estrellas (2011) | Eternamente enamorados (2012) |

Singles from Viaje a las estrellas
- 1. "Tu amor no es de este mundo" Released: August 2011

Professional ratings
Review scores
| Source | Rating |
|---|---|
| Amazon.com | 4/5 stars |
| iTunes Store | 4.8/5 stars |
| Coveralia | 3.5/5 stars |
| AllMusic | 4.5/5 stars |

Viaje a las estrellas (Spanish for 'Travel to the Stars') is the seventh studio album from contemporary Christian music duo Tercer Cielo. The album was released digitally on April 5, 2011 and then on May 3 in physical format. The album was produced and distributed under the Universal Music Latin/Vene Music/Fé y Obra Music/Kasa Productions/Mucho Fruto record labels. The album's lead single, "Tu amor no es de este mundo", was a hit in Latin America and North America. The music video reached over 10 million views on YouTube. The album was produced and written solely by Tercer Cielo member Juan Carlos Rodríguez. To promote the album, Tercer Cielo embarked on an international tour in the Americas and Europe. The album was nominated for a Latin Grammy in 2011.

== Antecedents and production ==
After promoting his previous album, Gente común, sueños extraordinarios, and having recorded his first live album in the Coliseo of Puerto Rico, Rodríguez began to devote time to the production of a new album. At the end of 2009, Juan Carlos announced via his Twitter account that the duo's album was in the pre-production stage and the title already was chosen. In early 2011, the duo posted a video on YouTube of them working in the recording studio and previewed songs which would be on the album, such as the unreleased track "Estaré" which consists of electronic music and dancepop, marking the duo's first steps into both musical genres. The recording process lasted for two months in both Bryan Studio in the Dominican Republic and Fé Studio in Chandler, Arizona, United States.

== Attainments ==
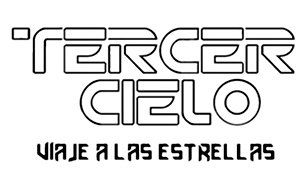
Logo used in the album cover

The album reached number 2 spot of the most sold albums in Puerto Rico, according to Nielsen's SoundScan index.

== Single ==
=== "Tu amor no es de este mundo" ===
In August 2011, the first single of the album "Tu amor no es de este mundo", a song written and produced by Juan Carlos Rodríguez with acoustic rhythms and Latin pop, was released. The official music video for the song was released on 17 August 2011. The single charted at number 25 on Latin Pop Airplay of Billboard.

== Track listing ==
| No. | Title | Writer(s) | Producer (s) | Length |
|---|---|---|---|---|
| 1. | "Amor real" | Juan Carlos Rodríguez | Rodríguez | 4:13 |
| 2. | "Tu amor no es de este mundo" | Rodríguez | Rodríguez | 4:01 |
| 3. | "Lindo viaje" | Rodríguez | Rodríguez | 4:04 |
| 4. | "Final del camino" | Rodríguez | Rodríguez | 4:18 |
| 5. | "El cielo es el límite" | Rodríguez | Rodríguez | 4:06 |
| 6. | "Estaré" | Rodríguez | Rodríguez | 3:23 |
| 7. | "El poder de un lo siento" | Rodríguez | Rodríguez | 3:57 |
| 8. | "Así es el amor" | Rodríguez | Rodríguez | 3:46 |
| 9. | "En el justo momento" | Rodríguez | Rodríguez | 4:21 |
| 10. | "Junto a mí" | Rodríguez | Rodríguez | 3:44 |
| 11. | "Un día mejor" | Rodríguez | Rodríguez | 4:05 |
| 12. | "Más que vencedor" | Rodríguez | Rodríguez | 4:11 |

== Charts ==
Positions obtained by Viaje a las estrellas
| Country | Chart (2011) | Peak |
America
| United States | Billboard Latin Pop Albums | 10 |
| United States | Billboard Christian Albums | 40 |
| United States | Billboard Top Heatseekers | 33 |
| United States | Billboard Top Latin Albums | 28 |

== Awards and nominations ==
| Year | Awards | Category | Resulted |
|---|---|---|---|
| 2011 | AMCL Awards | Artist of the Year | Won |
| 2011 | AMCL Awards | Song of the Year by "Tu amor no es de este mundo" | Won |
| 2011 | AMCL Awards | Promotional song of the Year by "Un día mejor" | Won |
| 2011 | Latin Grammy | Christian album in Spanish | Nominated |
| 2011 | Latin Billboard | Pop album of group or duet | Nominated |
| 2011 | Lo Nuestro Awards | Better group or duet | Nominated |
| 2011 | Casandra Awards | Contemporary religious music | Won |
| 2011 | Casandra Awards | Better album of contemporary religious music | Won |
| 2012 | Arpa Awards | Album of the year | Nominated |

== Credits and personnel ==
- Juan Carlos Rodríguez: Composer, mix, producer, recording, voice
- Evelyn Herrera: voice
- Apolinar: trombonist
- Richard Bravo: drummer
- José Fléte: trombonist
- Rebecca Jefferson: changing room
- Axel Rivera: battery
