= Hollywood (Tercer Cielo album) =

Studio album by Tercer Cielo
- Released: March 20, 2008
- Recorded: 2007–08: Box Pro, Nashville, Tennessee; FeStudio, Phoenix, Arizona; Mi Pacto Studio, Dominican Republic
- Genres: Christian music; gospel; latin pop
- Length: 56:32
- Labels: Kasa Producciones; Universal Music Latino; Vene Music
- Producer: Juan Carlos Rodríguez

Tercer Cielo chronology
Llueve (2007)	Hollywood (2008)	Es navidad (2008)

Singles from Tercer Cielo
- 1. "Yo te extrañaré" Released: 2007; 2. "Si no estás junto a mí" Released: 2008

Professional ratings
Review scores
Source	Rating
Amazon	4.5/5 stars
iTunes Store	4.5/5 stars
AllMusic	5/5 stars
Coveralia	5/5 stars

Hollywood is the fifth studio album of contemporary Christian music duo Tercer Cielo, released on March 20, 2008, by Disco Hit, in 2010 it was re-released in digital and in physical format by Universal Music Latino and Vene Music. The album was recorded in three different studies from the United States and Dominican Republic. The album is co-written and co-produced by Juan Carlos Rodríguez. Its most important single "Yo te extrañaré" entered the Billboard Latin Pop Airplay list at the 27th position.

== Background ==
After an 8-year career, and thanks that their previous work (Llueve) was better than the fans expected, the group's next album launched one of the biggest hits on the radio. "Hollywood" became the band's first album to win the award Album of the Year in the Premios AMCL. Production was energetic and dynamic, and consolidated and strengthened his career. The production was joined by five artists to collaborate on songs "Música por dentro" with the R&B singer Lilly Goodman, "Locos por Jesus" with Redimi2, and finally the song "Donde llegaremos" which was interpreted by Romy Ram, El Nuevo Padrino and La Discípula. The album consists of 15 songs. 13 songs were composed by Juan Carlos and two by Evelyn, all dealing with youth issues such as street life, drugs, disappointment, loneliness, love and life. This album sold over 100,000 copies mainly in Puerto Rico, the US and the song "Yo te extrañaré" got placed at number one on the charts for 5 consecutive weeks in Puerto Rico in the Christian radios, and 3 weeks radio "KQ 105 Univision Radio," also reaching other local charts in Central America, United States, Spain. With this album Tercer Cielo lasted for seven weeks in position 1 of the most sold in the entire island of Puerto Rico and 2 weeks in the No. 2 position of the disks on a general level (secular and Christian). Juan Carlos, voice, writer and producer of the album said his vision as a producer had "matured", who discovered ways to transform your thoughts into music and his team had improved in the production of this work, this album also won Juan Carlos Producer of the Year award in Premios AMCL.

== Singles ==
=== Yo te extrañaré ===
The first single from the album was "Yo te extrañaré" immediately distributed to Christian radio in Spanish in Central America, Mexico and the United States, the song was written and co-produced by Juan Carlos Rodríguez. The single was placed in the 27th position of the Latin Pop Airplay list of US magazine Billboard seven weeks by staying within their sales and reproductions of American radios. This song caused controversy among the religious public because of the subject matter of the lyrics which at first glance is the conversation between one person dead and another alive. The singer, Rodríguez, explained on Twitter:

It's a song of faith and hope and strength that ultimately brings you closer to God, because God's desire is that we continue forward. It is not the dead who is speaking but yourself. This is your own consciousness. Everything we did was put into song what consciousness tells us to think of the loved one who died.

Juan Carlos said in a separate statement "This song is very special. We never thought it would have much impact, it really is a very pleasant surprise for it to be used at such a difficult time for someone ... I never imagined that it would become an anthem". In 2013 the singer Lupillo Rivera made a Mexican regional music version of the song dedicated to his late sister Jenni Rivera. Later in 2009 Tercer Cielo recorded the song in mariachi version and included it on the album Gente común, sueños extraordinarios.

=== Si no estás junto a mí ===
Close to the end of 2008, the second single from the album started getting airplay on radio stations, "Si no estás junto a mí" was written and co-produced by Juan Carlos. It is the opening song to the album, it was selected because of its good Latin beat and pop with contemporary arrangements. On May 13, 2013, became a Lyric Video Song, published in the official YouTube account group, the video was animated and directed by the same member Juan Carlos.

== Track listing ==
No.	Title	Writer(s)	Producer(s)	Length
1.	"Si no estás junto a mí"	Juan Carlos Rodríguez	Rodríguez	3:39
2.	"Cada día"	Rodríguez	Rodríguez	4:07
3.	"Yo te extrañaré"	Rodríguez	Rodríguez	4:25
4.	"Héroe (Acoustic version)"	Rodríguez	Rodríguez	3:09
5.	"Música por dentro (with Lilly Goodman)"	Rodríguez, Lilly Goodman, Evelyn Herrera	Rodríguez	3:58
6.	"Vuelve a soñar"	Rodríguez	Rodríguez	3:38
7.	"Locos por Jesús (with Redimi2)"	Rodríguez, Willy González Cruz	Rodríguez	3:34
8.	"Afortunados"	Rodríguez	Rodríguez	3:51
9.	"La calle"	Rodríguez	Rodríguez	3:03
10.	"Regalo de Dios"	Rodríguez	Rodríguez	3:35
11.	"Donde Llegaremos (with Romy Ram, EL Nuevo Padrino and La Discípula)"	Rodríguez, Romy Rodolfo Abreu Moreno, Carlos Manuel Mosquea Zarzuela, Yinnete Laura Suárez	Rodríguez	4:58
12.	"Player"	Evelyn Herrera	Rodríguez	3:20
13.	"Nieve"	Rodríguez	Rodríguez	3:24
14.	"Hollywood"	Rodríguez	Rodríguez	3:50
15.	"MySpace Friend"	Evelyn Herrera	Rodríguez	3:51

== Credits and personnel ==
- Juan Carlos Rodríguez: Arrangements, songwriter, mastering, mixing, music, voice.
- Evelyn Herrera: Songwriter, voice.
- La Discípula: Songwriter, voice as guest artist in "Donde llegaremos".
- Lilly Goodman: Songwriter, voice as guest artist in "Música por dentro".
- El Nuevo Padrino: Songwriter, voice as guest artist in "Donde llegaremos".
- Romy Ram: Songwriter, voice as guest artist in "Donde llegaremos".
- Redimi2: Songwriter, voice as guest artist in "Locos por Jesús".
- Joel Soah: Saxophone.
- Edgar Winter: Art producer, artistic concept, photography.

== Certifications ==
Region	Certification	Certified units/sales
United States (RIAA)	Platinum (Latin)	60,000^{‡}
^{‡} Sales+streaming figures based on certification alone.

== Awards and nominations ==
Año	Awards	Nomination	Result
2008	Premios AMCL	Artist of the Year	Won
2008	Premios AMCL	Album of the Year for "Hollywood"	Won
2008	Premios AMCL	Band or Group of the Year	Won
2008	Premios AMCL	Songwriter of the Year (Juan Carlos)	Won
2008	Premios AMCL	Sound Quality of the Year for "Hollywood"	Won
2008	Premios AMCL	Song of the Year for "Si no estás junto a mí"	Won
2008	Premios AMCL	Collaboration of the Year for "Música por dentro" (with Lilly Goodman)	Won
2008	Premios AMCL	Album Cover Design of the Year for "Hollywood"	Won
