= CD Universe =

E-commerce website specializing in music, films and video games

- CD Universe logo
- Founded: April 1, 1996; 30 years ago
- Headquarters: Wallingford, Connecticut, U.S.
- Area served: Worldwide
- Founder: Charles Beilman
- Industry: Internet, online retailing
- Website: cduniverse.com
- Commercial: yes

CD Universe is an e-commerce site that sells adult toys, adult DVDs, lingerie, and sexual wellness items. The original CD Universe was an online store that sold music CDs, mp3 downloads, movies, and video games worldwide until June 2024. CD Universe also offered a wide selection of miscellaneous items such as stuffed animals, jigsaw puzzles, board games, etc.

== History ==
CD Universe was created in 1996 by founder and CEO Charles Beilman in Wallingford, Connecticut, United States. CD Universe listed over 940,000 physical products and over 6 million downloadable songs.

In 1999, CD Universe was sold by Charles Beilman to eUniverse. Charles Beilman bought CD Universe back from eUniverse in October, 2000 after eUniverse decided they wanted to focus on their entertainment business (they eventually owned MySpace).

In 2009, CD Universe began selling digital music in the DRM-free mp3 format, through their relationship with Neurotic Media.

Beilman retired in January 2020.

CD Universe closed in June 2024. By 15 June the website was bought, the logo slightly changed and is used to sell sexual content.

== Charity work ==
In September 2014, CD Universe began an effort to raise money for the well known and fiscally responsible charity called Room to Read. CD Universe supported Room to Read's goal of teaching every child to read and write, thus breaking the cycle of poverty.

CD Universe also supported The American Red Cross. Visitors that donated using the link on their website had their donations matched by CD Universe.

== Website security ==
CD Universe experienced a security breach in December 1999. Although this security breach was a major setback for the company and its customers' trust, CD Universe was able to stay in business and proceeded with an investigation. The hacker, however, a Russian known only by the name of "Maxus", was never caught.
