= Red TV (Colombian TV channel) =

Local TV station in Bogotá, Colombia

Red TV is a Colombian local religious television channel, based in Bogotá. It is owned by the Iglesia Manantial de Vida Eterna, a Christian congregation founded by pastor Eduardo Cañas Estrada. The broadcasting licence was granted by the National Television Commission on 19 July 2005. Broadcasts started December 2006.
