= Tercer Cielo =

Dominican Christian latin pop duo

- Origin: Dominican Republic
- Genres: Christian music (Latin pop)
- Years active: 2000–present
- Labels: Estribillo Music (2000–2007); Kasa Producciones(2007–2010); Fe Y Obra Music (2011–present)
- Members: Juan Carlos Rodríguez; Evelyn Herrera
- Past members: Marcos Yaroide (2000–2005)
- Website: www.tercercielooficial.com

Tercer Cielo (in English Third Heaven) is a contemporary Christian Latin pop music duo formed in 2000 by Dominicans Juan Carlos Rodriguez and Marcos Yaroide. The duo is currently composed of Rodriguez and his Mexican-American wife, Evelyn Herrera. Their biggest hits are "El uno para el otro", "Yo te extrañaré", "Mi último día", "Creeré", "Tu amor no es de este mundo", "Demente" and "No crezcas más". Their album Gente común, sueños extraordinarios, reached number one on the Billboard Latin Pop Albums chart in September 2009 and obtain a RIAA's Gold Certification.

Their albums have been well received in the Christian music genre in Latin America. They have sold more than 1,500,000 albums, which allowed them to travel to many Spanish-speaking countries to share an inspirational message using positive lyrics with a Biblical message and full of hope and life. Tercer Cielo sings not only Christian music but also includes love songs in their records, which opened doors in the world of secular music. They have received award nominations from around the world, including in Puerto Rico, Mexico, the Dominican Republic, Orlando, and California.

The group was a presenter at the 2011 Latin Billboard Music Awards. They made their Puerto Rico major-arena debut concert called En concierto "Creeré" at the Coliseo de Puerto Rico José Miguel Agrelot on 6 March 2010 and also performed on the Puerto Rican television reality show singing contest Yo Canto. They were nominated for Premio Lo Nuestro 2011, the 2010 Latin Billboard Music Awards and a 2011 Latin Grammy Award nomination for Best Christian Album.

== History ==
The group began when Juan Carlos Rodriguez and Marcos Yaroide sang in Christian events in their hometown of Santo Domingo. This then spread to churches and many charity concerts events, in which Tercer Cielo was formed. Through their music, Tercer Cielo supported the many churches financially and helped raise funds for many local ministries. Soon, word spread about this new duo and the group left their hometown, performing all around the country. It is said that one of their earlier concerts was attended by international Christian recording artists Freewill & JBG.

The first song the group recorded was called "Ella y él", written by Juan Carlos Rodriguez. It had R&B influences and told of the story of a young woman who abandoned her Christian faith to go a world that offered him nothing but pain and suffering. Soon the song became a hit in their country and the group was showered with invitations to concerts and events like never before, prompting the need to record an album. The group received the support of fellow rookie record label Estribillo Music and recorded the album En ti, which was very successful and was #1 on national Christian radio. Songs on that initial album include "El rapto", "En ti no dejaré de creer", and "Contigo estoy".

Among their other successes are "No importa", that won in 2007 two AMCL Awards for "Song of the Year" and "Composition of the Year". Juan Carlos Rodriguez was given the award for Songwriter of the Year. In 2009, they had two major successes: "Creeré" and "Mi último día," both of which were nominated for AMCL Awards in the category "Song of the Year". "Mi último día" was winner of "Song of the Year". In 2011, they produce "Tu amor no es de este mundo," winner of "Song of the Year" at AMCL Awards 2011.

In 2015, Irreversible has been nominated for the Latin Grammy 2015 in the category 'Best Christian Album in Spanish', this being his third nomination for the award. Earlier this year, the duo were also nominated for a Billboard Award in the category "Latin Pop Albums" Artist of the Year, Duo or Group for the same album.

== Change of members ==
In 2006, Marcos Yaroide decided to leave the group to form a solo career, which caused controversy among the media. Many fans and media thought it was due to disagreements between Yaroide and Rodriguez. Rodriguez and Yaroide later admitted in interviews that he had made his own decision to start a solo career, due to his desire to be a pastor.

Juan Carlos then decided to include his wife Evelyn Herrera as a new member of Tercer Cielo, arousing great curiosity in the artistic and Christian world. Many fans wanted to hear the seriousness of the new project. The idea, for many, was strange, because they believed that Tercer Cielo was over, but at the same time were interested because they wanted to hear what the new musical style would be like. Tercer Cielo was now something completely different and their expectations were great.

== Members ==
- Juan Carlos Rodriguez: Vocalist, arranger, composer, songwriter, producer
- Evelyn Herrera: Vocalist, songwriter

== Discography ==
Title	Album details	Peak chart positions			
Title	Album details	Billboard TLA	Billboard LPA	Billboard TCA	Billboard HA
En ti	Released: 20 July 2000; Label: Estribillo Music; Format: CD	—	—	—	—
Tercer Cielo	Released: 25 August 2002; Label: Kasa Producciones; Format: CD	—	—	—	—
Ahora tengo más	Released: 22 Sep 2004; Label: Kasa Producciones; Format: CD	—	—	—	—
Llueve	Released: 3 April 2007; Label: Fe Y Obra Music; Format: CD	—	—	—	—
Hollywood	Released: 20 March 2008; Label: Kasa Producciones; Format: CD	—	—	—	—
Gente común, sueños extraordinarios	Released: 23 June 2009; Label: Kasa Producciones; Format: CD	14	1	27	12
Viaje a las estrellas	Released: 3 May 2011; Label: Fe Y Obra Music; Format: CD	28	10	40	33
Lo que el viento me enseñó	Released: 24 April 2012; Label: Fe Y Obra Music; Format: CD	16	4	—	21
Irreversible	Released: 28 October 2014; Label: Fe Y Obra Music; Format: CD	12	3	43	46
Momentos en el Tiempo	Release: 16 March 2018; Label: Fe Y Obra Music; Format: digital	—	—	—	—
