= Marcos Yaroide =

Dominican singer (born 1975)

- Born: Marcos Yaroide Mejia Rambalde; October 7, 1975 (age 50)
- Origin: Santo Domingo, Dominican Republic
- Genres: Christian music, Latin pop
- Occupations: Singer, composer
- Instruments: Vocals
- Years active: 2000–present
- Spouse: Laura Cardenes

Marcos Yaroide Mejia Rambalde (born October 7, 1975) better known as Marcos Yaroide, is a Christian music singer and composer from the Dominican Republic and former member of the Christian music group Tercer Cielo.

He has been nominated three times at the Soberano Awards (previously, the Casandra Awards), where he was recognized in 2012 and 2018 as a "Contemporary Religious Music" artist.

== Career ==
In 2000, Marcos Yaroide and Juan Carlos Rodríguez formed the musical duo Tercer Cielo and recorded the Christian music hits like ”El rapto”, ”Ella y el”, ”Cuando el primer amor se va”, ”Dios no te olvida, Algún día”, ”Ahora tengo más”, ”Hoy te permito odiar”, among others. After three albums as a member of Tercer Cielo, where he received a double gold disc, multiple nominations for several music awards and participated in sold-out tours in much of Latin America, Marcos Yaroide decided to pursue a solo career.

Yaroide made his solo debut in 2006 with the album ”Cielos Abiertos”, in which the single "Todo se lo debo a él" appears. The single was a moderate success in the Latino community in the United States and in parts of Central and South America. His second album ”Mi Mejor Alabanza” was launched in November 2008 with distribution from Machete Music, a subsidiary of Universal Music Latino, and the singles "Mi mejor alabanza", "Estoy de pie", among others.

In 2010, Yaroide released his third album titled "Del Cielo a la Tierra", in which the singles "Mi trabajo es creer", "Que se abran los cielos" and "Como nunca imaginé" were released. Two years later in 2012, Yaroide launched the "Todavía Hay Esperanza" album with two charting singles on the radio: "Bendice tu pueblo" and "Por una como ella", song that was remixed in merengue with the participation of Grupo Manía in 2013.

In 2014, he celebrated 15 years of musical career with the album "15 Años Después Live", where he performed some hits and previously unreleased songs, and later in 2017, "La Vida Es", his latest record material.

In 2020, he held a concert for transmission through social networks, which had the participation of Tito El Bambino, Robert Green from the group Barak and Ema. Currently, she is part of the cast of Alofoke Radio, where she occasionally participates and has been a participant in interviews and biblical debates.

== Discography ==
- Cielos Abiertos – 2006
- Mi Mejor Alabanza – 2009
- Del Cielo a la Tierra – 2010
- Todavía Hay Esperanza – 2012
- 15 Años Después Live – 2014
- La Vida Es – 2017

== Collaborations ==
Marcos Yaroide has worked alongside several international performers including Divino, Cultura Profética, R.K.M & Ken-Y, Alex Zurdo, Redimi2 and Abraham Velásquez, among others.
