= Andy Mineo discography =

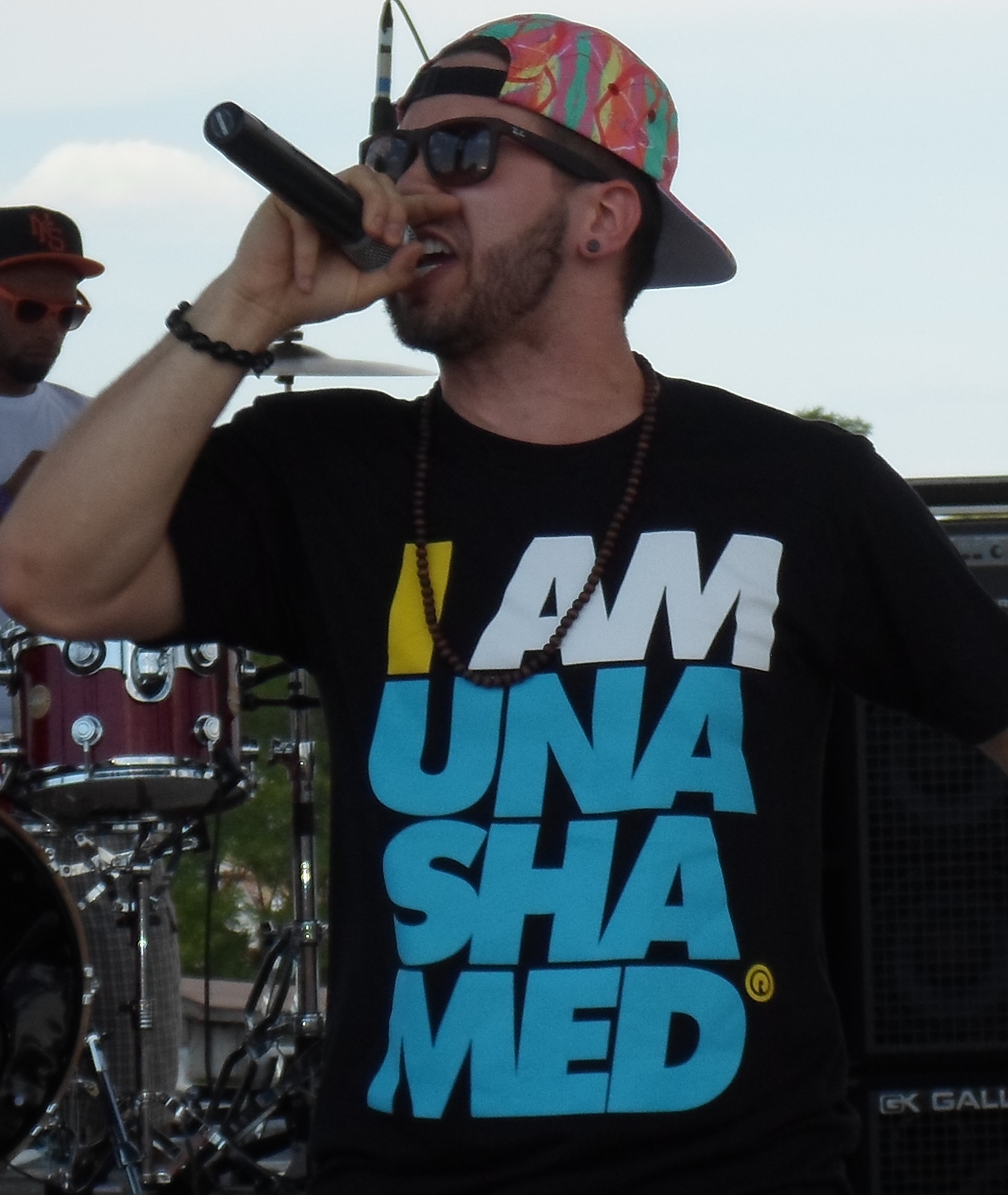
- Studio albums: 3
- Extended plays: 3
- Compilation albums: 1
- Singles: 22
- Music videos: 14
- Collaborative albums: 1
- Mixtapes: 3
- Guest appearances: 15

The discography of American Christian hip hop artist Andy Mineo, formerly known as C-Lite, consists of three studio albums, three mixtapes, one compilation album, twenty-one singles, including seven as a featured performer, fourteen music videos, including six as a featured artist, and fifteen guest appearances on various albums. Originally from Syracuse, Mineo initially achieved success as a producer in Upstate New York, and was a member of the hip hop group Fat Camp, signed to Syracuse University's Marshall Street Records. After moving to New York City where he re-dedicated his life to Christ, he closed down his production studio and restarted his career. He released his first mixtape Sin is Wack Vol. 1 in 2009. After providing sung vocals for the song "Background" by Lecrae from the album Rehab, he experienced a surge in popularity and became highly sought after for collaborations. His 2011 single "In My City" featuring Efrain from Doubledge also garnered attention, as did his appearance on the song "Reverse" by Tedashii from Blacklight. He signed to Reach Records in 2011 and dropped his stage name "C-Lite" in favor of his legal name. Under this name he released another mixtape, Formerly Known, in 2011. In May 2012 he debuted a four episode web series entitled Saturday Morning Car-Tunez in which he remixed classic hip hop songs. The four songs were subsequently released for free as a compilation album. His debut full-length studio album, Heroes for Sale, was released April 2013.

== Albums ==
=== Studio albums ===
List of studio albums, with selected chart positions and certifications
Title	Album details	Peak chart positions				
Title	Album details	US	US Rap	US Christ.	US Gospel	UK C&G.
Heroes for Sale	Released: April 16, 2013; Label: Reach; Formats: CD, LP, digital download, streaming	11	4	1	1	2
Uncomfortable	Released: September 18, 2015; Label: Reach; Formats: CD, LP, digital download, streaming	10	3	1	—	—
Never Land II	Released: October 1, 2021; Label: Reach, Miner League; Formats: CD, LP, digital download, streaming	152	—	2	2	—
The And	Released: November 28, 2025; Label: Minor League, Stem Records; Formats: Digital download, streaming	—	—	—	—	—

Note: Beginning in 2015, Billboard rendered most hip hop/rap albums ineligible for the Gospel charts

=== Collaborative albums ===
List of collaborative albums
Title	Album details	Peak chart positions			
Title	Album details	US	US Christ	US Rap	US R&B /HH
Andy Mineo and Wordsplayed Present Magic & Bird (with Wordsplayed)	Released: August 4, 2017; Label: Reach; Formats: CD, LP, digital download	49	1	23	28
Magic & Bird 2: What a Rush! (with Wordsplayed)	Released: June 26, 2026; Label: Minor League, Stem; Formats: Digital download, streaming	—	35	—	—

=== Mixtapes ===
List of mixtapes, with selected chart positions
Title	Album details	Peak chart positions			
Title	Album details	US	US Rap	US Christ.	US Gospel
Sin is Wack Vol. 1	1st mixtape; Released: January 1, 2009; Label: Independent	—	—	—	—
Formerly Known	2nd mixtape; Released: September 29, 2011; Label: Reach	—	—	—	40
Work In Progress	3rd mixtape; Released: August 23, 2019; Label: Reach	— (Note: Work In Progress did not enter the Billboard 200, but peaked at number 68 on the Top Album Sales chart.)	— (Note: Work In Progress did not enter the Billboard Top Rap Albums chart, but peaked at number 12 on the Rap Album Sales chart.)	2	—
For Promotional Use Only	Released: November 29, 2024; Label: Independent; Formats: Video streaming	—	—	—	—

=== Compilation albums ===
List of albums
Title	Album details
Saturday Morning Car-Tunez	Remix compilation; Released: June 28, 2012; Label: Reach

== Extended plays ==
List of extended plays
Title	Album details	Peak chart positions				Sales
Title	Album details	US	US Rap	US Christ.	UK Christ.	Sales
Never Land	Released: January 28, 2014; Label: Reach; Formats: CD, digital download	13	2	2	1	US: 72,000
I: The Arrow	Released: April 27, 2018; Label: Reach; Formats: CD, digital download	142	—	2	—	
II: The Sword	Released: September 27, 2018; Label: Reach; Formats: CD, digital download	—	—	4	—	
Happy Thoughts	Released: December 2, 2020; Label: Reach; Formats: CD, digital download	—	—	—	—	

== Singles ==
=== As lead artist ===
Year	Title	Chart positions	Certifications	Album
Year	Title	US Christ	Certifications	Album
2009	"Jesus Over Hip Hop" (featuring John Itiola)	—		Sin is Wack Vol. 1
2011	"In My City" (featuring Efrain of Doubledge)	—		non-album single
2011	"No Tombstone" (featuring Sheena Lee)	—		non-album single
2012	"Hands High" (remix of "Put Your Hands Where My Eyes Could See" by Busta Rhymes)	—		Saturday Morning Car-Tunez
2013	"Ayo!"	—		Heroes for Sale
2013	"Bitter"	—		Heroes for Sale
2013	"You Will"	—		Heroes for Sale
2013	"Stop the Traffic" (featuring Co Campbell)	—		King Kulture: Stop the Traffic
2014	"You Can't Stop Me"	—	RIAA: Platinum	Never Land (EP)
2014	"Paisano's Wylin'"	—		Never Land (EP)
2015	"Lay Up" (featuring Wordsplayed)	19		non-album single
2015	"Uncomfortable"	20		Uncomfortable
2015	"Hear My Heart"	—		Uncomfortable
2015	"I Can't Wait" (with Alex Medina)	—		non-album single
2016	"Candy Rain"	—		non-album single
2017	"KIDZ" (with Wordsplayed, Magic & Bird)	—		Andy Mineo and Wordsplayed Present Magic & Bird
2017	"DUNK CONTEST (MAGIC BIRD)" (with Wordsplayed)	19		Andy Mineo and Wordsplayed Present Magic & Bird
2017	"JUDO" (with Wordsplayed featuring Judo)	37		Andy Mineo and Wordsplayed Present Magic & Bird
2018	"Coquito" (featuring Foggieraw & Mannywellz)	—		Summer Eighteen
2018	"Coming In Hot" (with Lecrae)	21	RIAA: Platinum	Summer Eighteen; Never Land II
2019	"Keepin' It Movin'" (featuring Guvna B)	30		Work In Progress
2019	"Anything But Country"	—		Work In Progress
2019	"I Don't Need You"	38		Work In Progress
2019	"1988"	—		Work In Progress
2020	"Jackson Pollock"	42		Happy Thoughts
2020	"Herman Miller"	—		Happy Thoughts
2020	"WILLY" (featuring nobigdyl.)	—		Happy Thoughts
2021	"MPJ Freestyle"	43		non-album single
2021	"Been About It" (featuring Lecrae)	43		Never Land II
2024	"Red Room (Freestyle)"	—		The And
2025	"I Swear, This Is Not an André 3000 Diss Song"	—		The And
2025	"Okayyy We Back" (with Mark Morrison)	—		The And
2026	"2026" (with Forrest Frank)	—		Non-album single

=== As featured artist ===
Year	Title	Chart positions		Album
Year	Title	US Christ	US Gospel	Album
2012	"Me Monster" (808&Elite featuring Andy Mineo)	—	—	Diamonds X Pearls
2012	"Go Off" (KB featuring Andy Mineo & Tedashii)	—	—	Weight & Glory
2012	"Destiny" (Sheena Lee featuring Andy Mineo)	—	—	Project Destiny
2012	"Tell Em All" (S.O. featuring Andy Mineo)	—	—	So It Continues
2012	"Say" (Skrip featuring Andy Mineo)	—	—	The Und_rscore II
2013	"Bass Loud" (Beleaf featuring Andy Mineo)	—	—	Theo's Gift
2014	"100" (KB featuring Andy Mineo)	31	18	100
2014	"Brave" (Moriah Peters featuring Andy Mineo)	—	—	Brave
2014	"Run Wild" (For King and Country featuring Andy Mineo)	37	—	Run Wild. Live Free. Love Strong.
2014	"How Did We Get Here" (Propaganda featuring Andy Mineo & JGivens)	—	—	Crimson Cord
2014	"Catch Me If You Can" (Tedashii featuring Andy Mineo)	—	—	Below Paradise
2014	"Say I Won't" (Lecrae featuring Andy Mineo)	2	1	Anomaly
2014	"Martinelli" (Wordsplayed featuring Andy Mineo)	—	—	non-album single
2019	"Heavy is the Weight" (Memphis May Fire featuring Andy Mineo)	—	—	Broken
2019	"Every Little Thing" (Hillsong Young & Free featuring Andy Mineo)	—	—	III (Reimagined)

Note: Beginning in 2015, Billboard rendered most hip hop/rap albums ineligible for the Gospel charts

== Other charted songs ==
Year	Title	Chart positions		Certifications	Album
Year	Title	US Christ	US Gospel	Certifications	Album
2010	"Background" (Lecrae featuring C-Lite)	39	—		Rehab
2013	"Uno Uno Seis" (featuring Lecrae)	43	15		Heroes for Sale
2013	"The Saints" (featuring KB & Trip Lee)	44	18		Heroes for Sale
2014	"You Can't Stop Me"	11	4	RIAA: Gold	Never Land
2014	"Paisano's Wylin'" (featuring Marty of Social Club)	32	19		Never Land
2014	"Paganini" (featuring KB and Canon)	46	21		Never Land
2014	"Never Land"	23	13		Never Land
2014	"Death of Me"	25	—		Never Land
2014	"Insomniac" (Trip Lee featuring Andy Mineo)	39	20		Rise
2015	"Desperados" (featuring Mali Music)	28	—		Uncomfortable
2015	"Ghost"	50	—		Uncomfortable
2015	"Know That's Right"	25	—		Uncomfortable
2015	"Now I Know"	34	—		Uncomfortable
2015	"Rat Race" (featuring Jon Bellion)	47	—		Uncomfortable
2015	"Vendetta"	44	—		Uncomfortable
2017	"SAY LESS"	40	—		Andy Mineo and Wordsplayed Present Magic & Bird
2017	"TEAM"	50	—		Andy Mineo and Wordsplayed Present Magic & Bird
2018	"I Ain't Done"	26	—		I: The Arrow
2018	"Clarity"	30	—		I: The Arrow
2018	"…Lost"	40	—		I: The Arrow
2018	"I've Been…"	41	—		I: The Arrow
2018	"Friends"	39	—		I: The Arrow
2018	"...There"	48	—		I: The Arrow
2018	"None of My Business"	49	—		II: The Sword

Note: Beginning in 2015, Billboard rendered most hip hop/rap albums ineligible for the Gospel charts

== Guest appearances ==
Year	Title	Other performer(s)	Album
2010	"Put On"	Flame	Captured
2011	"In His Image"	PRo, Chad Jones	PSA: Vol. 2
2011	"The Reunion Cypha"	The Ambassador, God's Servant, J.A.Z., Shai Linne, Cruz Cordero & DJ Wade-O	Stop the Funeral
2011	"Reverse"	Tedashii	Blacklight
2011	"Upper Room"	theBREAX	Breax Over III
2011	"The Hardway	Braille	Native Lungs
2011	"Read Me"	Benjah, Ron Kenoly Jr.	The Breakup
2011	"The Omnis"	Shai Linne, Giano, Omri	The Attributes of God
2012	"One Sixteen"	Trip Lee, KB	The Good Life
2012	"Love on Display"	Trip Lee	The Good Life
2012	"Do It for the City"	Viktory, Canton Jones	R4 (Relentless 4Ever)
2012	"The Price of Life"	Lecrae, Co Campbell	Church Clothes
2012	"Power Trip"	Lecrae, Sho Baraka, PRo	Gravity
2013	"The Saints Remix"	Black Knight, Trip Lee, KB	#ItsTheBlackKnight Beat Tape
2013	"The Fever"	Lecrae, Papa San	Church Clothes 2
2014	"Catch Me if You Can"	Tedashii	Below Paradise
2016	"The Upside Down"	Tedashii	non-album song
2018	"Heavy is the Weight"	Memphis May Fire	Broken
2019	"Gut Puncher"	Futuristic	I Am...

== Music videos ==
=== As lead artist ===
Title	Year	Director
"No Tombstone" (featuring Sheena Lee)	2009	David Ham, John Casem, Alex Leu
"In My City" (featuring Efrain from Doubledge)	2010	David Ham, Andy "C-Lite" Mineo
"Introducing Andy Mineo"	2011	—N/a
"Formerly Known"	2011	—N/a
"Everyday Thing"	2011	Francis De La Torre
"Fools Gold" (featuring Sho Baraka)	2011	Francis De La Torre, Andy Mineo
"Young" (featuring KB)	2012	—N/a
"Ayo!"	2013	Squint & ORIGIN8 Visuals
"You Will"	2013	Francis De La Torre
"Wild Things"	2013	The Craig Brothers
"Paisano's Wylin'" (featuring Marty of Social Club)	2014	We Are Films
"You Can't Stop Me"	2015	Kyle Dettman
"Hear My Heart"	2016	Kyle Dettman

=== As featured performer ===
Title	Year	Director
"Background" (Lecrae featuring Andy Mineo)	2010	David Ham
"In His Image" (PRo featuring Andy Mineo)	2011	—N/a
"Tell Em All" (S.O. featuring Andy Mineo)	2012	Josh
"The 'Mantra'" (Ye Hip Hop featuring Andy Mineo)	2012	N2XPro/Pyro
"One Sixteen" (Trip Lee featuring KB & Andy Mineo)	2012	—N/a
"Say" (Skrip featuring Andy Mineo)	2013	—N/a
"Destiny" (Sheena Lee featuring Andy Mineo)	2013	Will Thomas
"Say I Won't" (Lecrae featuring Andy Mineo)	2014	Nathan Corrona
"Martinelli" (Wordsplayed featuring Andy Mineo)	2014	Andy Mineo, We Are Films
"Gut Puncher" (Futuristic featuring Andy Mineo)	2019	Brandon Menace
