= Contraband (disambiguation) =

Contraband refers to goods which are illegal to possess or trade.

Contraband may also refer to:

== Arts, entertainment, and media ==
=== Films ===
- Contraband (1925 film), a lost silent film
- Contraband (1940 film), a Powell and Pressburger film
- Contraband (1980 film), an Italian crime drama directed by Lucio Fulci
- Contraband (2012 film), an American film

=== Music ===
- Contraband (band), a short-lived supergroup formed in the early 1990s
- Contraband (big band), a progressive big band led by trombonist Willem van Manen
- Contraband, an Australian hard rock band previously known as Finch
- Contraband (Golden Earring album), a 1976 release from the Dutch rock band
- Contraband (Madcon album), released in 2010 by the Norwegian urban music duo Madcon
- Contraband (Velvet Revolver album), the 2004 debut album from US rock band Velvet Revolver
- Contraband (Naisha song), released in 2026 by Indian musician Naisha
- Contraband, debut album for Spliff Star, released in 2008
- "Contraband", a track from Mad Caddies' 2003 album Just One More

=== Literature ===
- Contraband (novel), (1938) novel by cuban writer and journalist Enrique Serpa

== Other uses ==
- Contraband (American Civil War), a status for fugitive slaves behind Union lines in Confederate territory during the American Civil War
- Contraband (coal mine), items which for safety reasons are not allowed to be taken underground in a coal mine
- Contraband (performance group), a dance-based performance ensemble from San Francisco
- Contraband Bayou, a large bayou in Louisiana, United States
