= Never Land (EP) =

EP by Andy Mineo
- Released: January 28, 2014
- Studio: Jahrock'n Studios, Brooklyn, NY
- Genre: Christian hip hop, progressive hip hop
- Label: Reach
- Producer: J.R., Alex Medina, Tyshane, Gawvi, Joseph Prielozny, Andy Mineo, Chris "Morganism" Morgan, Raymond "Ray Rock" Castro, Dre "The Giant" Garcia, Big Juice

Andy Mineo chronology
Heroes for Sale (2013)	Never Land (2014)	Uncomfortable (2015)

Never Land is the first EP by American Christian hip hop artist Andy Mineo, released on January 28, 2014. It follows up to his 2013 studio album Heroes for Sale.

== Reception ==
Professional ratings
Review scores
Source	Rating
Jesus Freak Hideout	3.5/5 stars

=== Commercial performance ===
The EP debuted at number 13 on the Billboard 200 with 26,000 copies sold in its first week. The album has sold 72,000 copies in the US as of September 2015.

== Track list ==
No.	Title	Writer(s)	Producer(s)	Length
1.	"Never Land" (featuring Marz Ferrer)	Courtney Orlando Peebles, Marz Ferrer, and Andy Mineo	J.R.	4:51
2.	"Paisano's Wylin'" (featuring Marty of Social Club)	Alex Medina, Tyshane Thompson, Glen Henry, Martin Lorenzo Santiago, and Mineo	Alex Medina, Tyshane	4:12
3.	"You Can't Stop Me"	Medina, Gabriel Azucena, and Mineo	Alex Medina, Gawvi	3:59
4.	"Rewind" (featuring Kam Parker)	Azucena, Joseph Prielozny, Kam Parker, and Mineo	Gawvi, Joseph Prielozny	4:11
5.	"All We Got" (featuring Dimitri McDowell)	Dimitri McDowell and Mineo	Chris "Morganism" Morgan, J.R., Andy Mineo (co-production)	5:09
6.	"Paganini" (featuring Canon & KB)	Prielozny, Dre Garcia, Raymond Castro, Kevin Elijah Burgess, Aaron McCain, and Mineo	Raymond "Ray Rock" Castro, Dre "The Giant" Garcia (co-production), Joseph Prielozny (additional production)	3:33
7.	"Death of Me"	Alex Hitchins, Prielozny, Medina, and Mineo	Alex Medina, Big Juice, Joseph Prielozny, Andy Mineo (additional production)	4:35

== Charts ==
Chart (2014)	Peak position
US Billboard 200	13
US Top Rap Albums	2
US Top Christian Albums	2
US Top Gospel Albums	1
US Top Digital Albums	6
US Top Independent Albums	3
