= Beam (hip-hop musician) =

American musical artist (born 1995)

- Also known as: Elite; Tyshane
- Born: Tyshane Thompson; 1995 (age 30–31); Saint Andrew Parish, Jamaica
- Origin: Weston, Florida, U.S.
- Genres: Hip hop; trap; reggae; dancehall; gospel reggae
- Occupations: Rapper; singer; songwriter; record producer
- Instrument: Vocals
- Years active: 2005–present
- Label: Epic
- Website: whoisbeam.com

Tyshane Thompson (born 1995), known professionally as Beam (a backronym for Be Everything and More; stylised in all caps; formerly as Tyshane and Elite), is a Jamaican-born American rapper, singer, songwriter, and record producer. He is the son of dancehall and gospel reggae singer Papa San. He was one-half of the production duo 808&Elite. Beam released his debut studio album, Alien, on February 4, 2022. It includes collaborations with Justin Bieber, Jorja Smith, and his father, among others.

== Career ==
According to Thompson's father, he started producing at age ten. He formed the now-disbanded production duo 808&Elite with Matt Massaro.

He first received notice when he produced for Andy Mineo on the tracks "Young", featuring KB, and "Michael Jackson", featuring Thi'sl, Rich Perez, R-Swift, and Bubba Watson, from the mixtape Formerly Known in 2011. In 2012 he produced the highly popular, Jamaican-tinged song "Black Rose" by Lecrae on the mixtape Church Clothes. He also appeared in the final episode of the web-series Saturday Morning Car-Tunez, created by Andy Mineo, where he helped remix the Puff Daddy song "It's All About the Benjamins". On July 6, 2012, Thompson and Matt Massaro, under the name 808&Elite, released the single "Me Monster", featuring Andy Mineo, from their upcoming beat-tape, Diamonds x Pearls. The tape was made available two days later for free download exclusively through the Christian hip-hop website Rapzilla. Thompson's talent was praised by critics when he and ThaInnaCircle produced the bass-heavy, East Coast style, reggae and dancehall-influenced song "Violence" by Lecrae from the Grammy-winning album Gravity, released on September 4, 2012. In October 2012, Thompson competed at the second Annual Rapzilla.com Beat Battle at the 2012 Flavor Fest. Thompson, his father Papa San and brother Tyrone Andrew, are working on a collaborative project. 808 & Elite now produces under Street Symphony's Track or Die label. In addition to his work with his father and brother, Lecrae, and Andy Mineo, Tyshane has produced, both independently and as part of 808 & Elite, for artists such as 2 Chainz, Yo Gotti, G-Eazy, Xavier Omär, and Asaiah Ziv.

He was featured by Beyoncé on her 2022 album Renaissance, on the song "Energy".

He co-wrote the track "Burn" from ¥$ (Kanye West and Ty Dolla Sign) album Vultures 1, released on 10 February 2024.

== Discography ==
=== Studio albums ===
Title	Album details
Alien	Released: February 4, 2022; Label: Epic; Format: Digital download, streaming

=== Extended plays ===
Title	Extended play details
95	Released: October 18, 2019; Label: Epic; Format: Digital download, streaming
Crimson Soundtrack	Released: October 29, 2020; Label: Epic; Format: Digital download, streaming

=== Singles ===
==== As lead artist ====
List of singles as lead artist, showing year released and album name
Title	Year	Album
"Chat Bout"	2017	Non-album singles
"Problems"	2017	Non-album singles
"Centipede"	2017	Non-album singles
"Cactus"	2018	Non-album singles
"2x2 (ColorsxStudios version)"	2020	95
"Psycho"	2020	Crimson Soundtrack
"Numby" (with Artz and Bugy)	2021	We Survive
"Anxiety"	2021	Alien
"Win"	2022	Alien
"Planet Beam"	2022	Alien

==== As featured artist ====
List of singles as featured artist
Title	Year	Album
"Rave de Favela" (with MC Lan, Major Lazer and Anitta featuring Beam)	2020	Music Is the Weapon
"Slip" (Ambré featuring Beam)	2020	Pulp
"Fine China" (Odalys featuring Beam)	2020	Non-album single
"Delete" (Ape Drums featuring Beam)	2020	Soundboy
"Toxic" (Maeta featuring Beam)	2021	Habits
"Searching (Remix)" (Abir featuring Wafia and Beam)	2021	Non-album singles
"Truck Riddim" (Bambii featuring Beam)	2021	Non-album singles
"On My Own" (Sainvil featuring Beam)	2021	They're All Goblins
"Burn" (Darci featuring Beam)	2021	Long Days Away
"Contact (Remix)" (Dimitri McDowell featuring Beam)	2021	Non-album single
"Tonight" (Tasan featuring Beam)	2021	Ornaments
"Beg Mi Ah Link" (Stefflon Don featuring Beam)	2021	Non-album single
"Kalash" (Delara featuring Beam)	2023	Shahrazad
"How Could You" (Lay Bankz featuring Beam)	2024	After 7

==== Other charted songs ====
List of songs, with selected chart positions, showing year released and album name
Title	Year	Peak chart positions									Album
Title	Year	US	US Christ.	AUS	CAN	DEN	NZ	SWE	UK Stream.	WW	Album
"Team" (Andy Mineo and Wordsplayed featuring Beam)	2017	—	50	—	—	—	—	—	—	—	Andy Mineo and Wordsplayed Present Magic & Bird
"Dive" (Social Club Misfits featuring Beam)	2017	—	47	—	—	—	—	—	—	—	Into the Night
"Love You Different" (Justin Bieber featuring Beam)	2021	84	—	72	35	31	—	91	73	58	Justice
"Freedom" (with Justin Bieber)	2021	—	20	—	—	—	— (Note: "Freedom" did not enter the NZ Top 40 Singles Chart, but peaked at number 34 on the NZ Hot Singles Chart.)	—	—	—	Freedom
"Top Shotta" (Pop Smoke and the Neptunes featuring Pusha T, Travi, and Beam)	2021	— (Note: "Top Shotta" did not enter the Billboard Hot 100, but peaked at number 10 on the Bubbling Under Hot 100 chart.)	—	—	67	—	—	—	—	180	Faith
"Energy" (Beyoncé featuring Beam)	2022	27	—	42	46	—	40	— (Note: "Energy" did not enter the Swedish Singellista Chart, but peaked at number 16 on the Sweden Heatseeker Chart.)	34	23	Renaissance
"Link Up" (Metro Boomin, Don Toliver, and Wizkid featuring Beam and Toian)	2023	— (Note: "Link Up" did not enter the Billboard Hot 100, but peaked at number four on the Bubbling Under Hot 100 chart.)	—	—	69	—	—	—	—	167	Spider-Man: Across the Spider-Verse (Soundtrack from and Inspired by the Motion Picture)

==== Guest appearances ====
List of non-single guest appearances, with other performing artists, showing year released and album name
Title	Year	Album
"Fireworks" (KIDD featuring Tyshane)	2012	Non-album song
"Fire" (Steven Malcolm featuring Beam)	2017	Steven Malcolm
"Break Bread" (Andy Mineo and Wordsplayed featuring Beam)	2017	Andy Mineo and Wordsplayed Present Magic & Bird
"Team" (Andy Mineo and Wordsplayed featuring Beam)	2017	Andy Mineo and Wordsplayed Present Magic & Bird
"Act Like" (Asaiah Ziv featuring Beam)	2017	I'm Despressed, but Happy
"Dive" (Social Club Misfits featuring Beam)	2017	Into the Night
"Mad Over We" (LevyGrey featuring Beam)	2019	Figures
"Mumbai Power" (Skrillex featuring Beam)	2019	Show Tracks
"Bags" (Anto featuring Beam)	2020	Small Talk
"Moneybag Szn" (Kasien with Beam)	2020	I Found Paradise in Hell
"Up Inna (Remix)" (Cadenza, M.I.A. and GuiltyBeatz featuring Beam, Cham and Alicai Harley)	2020	Up Inna
"Love Cost Too Much" (Preme and Popcaan featuring Beam)	2020	Link Up
"Bam Bam" (Major Lazer featuring French Montana and Beam)	2020	Music Is the Weapon
"Tiny" (Major Lazer featuring Beam and Shenseea)	2020	Music Is the Weapon
"Goddess" (Mitch featuring Beam and Ilham)	2020	Better For You
"York Way" (Vory featuring Beam)	2020	Vory
"Every Morning" (Patrick Cc: featuring Beam)	2021	Launch Sequence
"Love You Different" (Justin Bieber featuring Beam)	2021	Justice
"Freedom" (Justin Bieber and Beam)	2021	Freedom
"Honor (Remix)" (A!MS featuring AV Allure, Kent Jones, Moelogo, Projexx, Julian Marley and Beam)	2021	Offshore
"Pretty Ugly" (Stalk Ashley featuring Beam)	2021	Excuses, Pt. I
"Baby Blues (Remix)" (Audrey Nuna featuring Beam)	2022	A Liquid Breakfast
"Eternity" (Kyle featuring Beam)	2022	It's Not So Bad
"Energy" (Beyoncé featuring Beam)	2022	Renaissance
"Link Up" (Metro Boomin, Don Toliver, and Wizkid featuring Beam and Toian)	2023	Spider-Man: Across the Spider-Verse (Soundtrack from & Inspired by the Motion Picture)
"Contraband" (Naisha featuring Skrillex, Beam and DiIip)	2026	911

== Production discography ==
=== 2010 ===
Tyrone Andrew – The Road
03. "Narrow Road" (featuring Jonathan Guerra)
04. "Take Him On"

=== 2011 ===
Andy Mineo – Formerly Known
05. "Young" (featuring KB)

Paul Morris – Paul Morris Under Construction – Co-produced with Paul Morris

=== 2012 ===
Papa San – My Story

Tyrone Andrew – "Encamp"

Lecrae – Church Clothes
09. "Black Rose"

Andy Mineo – Saturday Morning Cartoons

04. "Benjamins" (featuring Rich Perez and Izz) – remix of "It's All About the Benjamins" by Puff Daddy (featuring Lil' Kim, The LOX, and The Notorious B.I.G.)

Tyrone Andrew – "Love or Hate"

Lecrae – Gravity
07. "Violence" – (Co-produced with ThaInnaCircle)

DJ Official and Alex Medina – Gravity The Remix EP

13. "Tell the World" (featuring Mali Music)

KIDD – "Fireworks" (featuring Tyshane)

=== 2013 ===
Beleaf – Theo's Gift
06. "Bass Loud" (featuring Andy Mineo)

Gabe – "Yikes" (featuring Tyshane)

Andy Mineo – Heroes for Sale
09. "Wild Things" – (Co-produced with ThaInnaCircle & Joseph Prielozny)
10. "Take Me Alive"

SPZRKT – The Loner
14. "Spazzy Party (Turn Up)"

SPZRKT – "Best of Your Love"

Social Club – Summer of George
05. Majestic (featuring Thi'sl)

KIDD – "Murder My Flesh" – (Co-produced with ThaInnaCircle)

KIDD – Murder My Flesh
01. "Intro"

Papa San – One Blood
01. "Step Up" (featuring Da' T.R.U.T.H.)
02. "Your Eyes Are On Me" (featuring Fred Hammond) – Co-produced with Maurice Gregory
03. "Radio" (featuring Lecrae) – Co-produced with Maurice Gregory
04. "One Blood" (featuring Stitchie)
05. "Running" (featuring Tasan)
06. "Get Right" – Co-produced with Maurice Gregory
07. "Revival" (featuring Israel Houghton) – Co-produced with Maurice Gregory
08. "Show Me" (featuring Tiffany Hall) – Co-produced with Maurice Gregory
09. "I Love You" (featuring Tyrone Andrew) – Co-produced with ThaInnaCircle
11. "God By My Side" (featuring Ryan Mark)
13. "Don't Give Up the Fight" (featuring Jael Wiafe)

SPZRKT – Lucid Dream
01. "Back to You" – Co-produced with Jermaine

Lecrae – Church Clothes 2
04. "The Fever"

Man Praisin Hard – Critical Condition: The Mixtape, pt. 2
08. "Twerk Muzik"

=== 2014 ===
GABRL – "Starters" (featuring Tyshane)

J Mynor – "New Me"

KB – 100
06. "Crazy" – Co-produced with Cardec and Joseph Prielozny

The Rise – Casual Tuesdays
01. "Work"

D. Tropp – Away from Home
05. "Choices (The Break-Up)"
08. "Misbehave" (featuring SPZRKT) – Co-produced with Cardec Drums

Surf Gvng – Surf Gvng
06. "Sonic Boom" (featuring Marty)

Ernest Rush – STRT TRBL
03. "Another Taste"

=== 2015 ===
Gabrl – Here's a Mixtape
02. "Untitled" (Co-produced with Gordonbeats, dsavagebeats, and pharaoh)
03. "Who" (co-produced with Alias and Dáramólá)

Yo Gotti – CM8
06. "No Mo" (co-produced with Street Symphony and D.O Speaks)

=== 2016 ===
Adrian Stresow – Pajama Day
06. "Slippin'" (featuring Surf Gvng) (co-produced with D-Flow)

Stef Silva – "Highs" (co-produced with Alias)

Xavier Omar – "Hesitate"

Trav – Push3
21. "We Living" (co-produced with Street Symphony)

=== 2017 ===
Social Club Misfits – "Dive" (co-produced with Young Sidechain)

=== 2018 ===
21 Savage – I Am > I Was
10. "Ball w/o You" (co-produced with TM88)
11. "Good Day" (featuring ScHoolboy Q & Project Pat) (co-produced with 30 Roc & Cardo)

=== 2019 ===
Andy Mineo – "Work In Progress"
03. "OT OD (sketch).mp3" (co-produced by Alex Medina)
18. "Honest 2 God Tyshance/DTSL 1.0.mp3" (co-produced by Daniel Steele)
20. "I ain't done (Beam Version).aif"

Skip Marley – "Enemy" (co-produced by Ryan Tedder)

=== 2021 ===
Anuel AA – "Llorando en un Ferrari" (co-produced by Boombox Cartel, Machael, Max Borghetti, Dim Crux, Urbøi)

=== 2022 ===
Justin Bieber – "Honest" (featuring Don Toliver) (co-produced with Sonni and Azul Wynter)

Beyoncé - Renaissance
05. Energy (featuring Beam) (co-produced with Beyoncé, Skrillex, Al Cres, Nova Wav)

=== 2023 ===
Metro Boomin - Spider-Man: Across the Spider-Verse (soundtrack)
08. "Link Up" (with Don Toliver and Wizkid featuring Beam and Toian) (co-produced with Metro, Al Cres, Chris Townsend, and Peter Lee Johnson)

== 808&Elite discography ==
=== EPs ===
2012	New Era Vol. 1: 1st extended play; Released: 2012; Label: Independent
2012	Diamonds x Pearls: 2nd extended play; Released: 2012; Label: Beloved / Rapzilla

=== Compilations ===
2012	newxera: 1st compilation album; Released: 2012; Label: Beloved / Independent

=== Singles ===
Title	Year	Album
"Me Monster" (featuring Andy Mineo)	2012	Diamonds x Pearls
"The Weeknd x Often (Remix)"	2014	Non-album remix single

=== Production discography ===
Note that this includes tracks produced only by Matt Massaro aka 808

==== 2011 ====
Andy Mineo – Formerly Known
14. "Michael Jackson" (featuring Thi'sl, Rich Perez, R-Swift, and Bubba Watson)

==== 2013 ====
Andy Mineo – Heroes for Sale
08. "Shallow" (featuring Swoope) – Additional production from Joseph Prielozny and Andy Mineo

116 Clique – "Now They Know"

Lecrae – Church Clothes 2
01. "Co Sign pt. 2" – Co-produced with Street Symphony

SPZRKT – Lucid Dream
04. "Love & Pain (SPZRKT Remix)" – Co-produced with Sango Beats

==== 2014 ====
Bishop – Rose Gold
08. "Sinderella" – Produced by 808 and Mishene City

Thomas McLaren – "Us"

GABRL – "Better (Where I'm From)" (featuring SPZRKT)

GABRL – "Wake Up"

2 Chainz – Freebase
02. "Trap Back" – Co-produced with Street Symphony

Tracy T – The Wolf of All Streets
14. "Save Me" – Co-produced with Street Symphony

Tedashii – Below Paradise
13. "Complicated" (featuring Christon Gray) – Co-produced with Mashell and TOD

HillaryJane – Sticks and Stones
01. "Chimneys"
02. "Celebrity" (featuring Thi’sl)
03. "Wild Side"
04. "Shotgun"
05. "We Fight"
06. "Stix and Stones"

Wave Chapelle – Only the Beginning
05. "I Want It All" – Co-produced with Street Symphony

Lecrae – Anomaly
03. "Say I Won't" (featuring Andy Mineo) – Co-produced with Gawvi, with post-production by Andy Mineo

Paul Morris – Square One
01. "My Heart"
02. "Square One"
04. "Fallible Man" (featuring Rheama Blaze) – Co-produced with Paul Morris
07. "Luke Warm"
10. "Ready To Die"
11. "Soldiers of the Light"

Spencer Kane – Runway
03. "Runway"

Ernest Rush – STRT TRBL
08. "Say What [Remix]"

==== 2015 ====
Thomas McLaren – "Us"

Yo Gotti – Concealed
03. Super Power (co-produced with Street Symphony and D.O Speaks)

Neek Bucks – Here For a Reason Vol. II

"How Can I" (featuring Kevin Gates) (co-produced with Street Symphony)

Genra – "The Notebook" (co-produced with Alias)

Genra – "Black Holes" – produced by 8X8

KB – Tomorrow We Live
09. "Calling You" (featuring Natalie Lauren) – (co-produced with Dirty Rice and Joseph Prielozny)
13. "Crowns & Thorns (Oceans)" – (co-produced with Gawvi)

GABRL – Here's a Mixtape
05. "Bet You Wish
06. "Flaw City" (co-produced with 100 Labels)
07. "Anthum"
08. "Rocafella" (featuring Tasan and Daramola)
09. "Lies (Bonus)"

Reconcile – Catching Bodies
04. "Temptation" (featuring John Givez, Alex Faith, and Tasha Catour) – produced by 8X8 and D.O Speaks

2 Chainz – Trapavelli Tre
09. "Halo (Letter from My Unborn Son)" (co-produced with Street Symphony)

==== 2016 ====
Reconcile – "Cross on Me" (co-produced with Alias)

2 Chainz – Felt Like Cappin
05. Mindin my Business (produced by 8x8, D.O. Speaks & Street Symphony)

SPZRT – "Hesitate" (featuring Masaxgo) (co-produced with Alias)

David Banner – "Black Fist" (featuring Tito Lopez) (co-produced with Street Symphony and D.O Speaks)

Trav – Push3
02. "It's a Will It's a Way" (co-produced with Street Symphony)

G Easy – "So Much Better" (featuring Playne James) (co-produced with Street Symphony)

Gabrl – "Too Much Left"

Zoey Dollaz – October
06. "U Can Be That" (featuring Ink) (produced by Street Symphony, 8x8, and D.O. Speaks)

2 Chainz – "Let's Ride" (featuring Ty Dolla Sign) – (produced by 8X8, Street Symphony, and D.O Speaks)

== Filmography ==
=== As composer ===
Year	Title	Director
2020	Crimson	Gregory Plotkin

=== As actor ===
Year	Title	Role	Episode
2012	Saturday Morning Car-Tunez	Himself	Episode 4

== Awards ==
- co-producer for a track on Lacrae's album Gravity, 2013 winner for Best Gospel Album at the 55th Annual Grammy Awards
