= I Need Love (disambiguation) =

"I Need Love" is a song by LL Cool J.

I Need Love may also refer to:

- "I Need Love" (Olivia Newton-John song), 1992
- "I Need Love", single by Rhinoceros (band)
- "I Need Love", by Deep Purple from Come Taste the Band
- "I Need Love", by Golden Earring from Contraband
- "I Need Love", by Laura Pausini from From the Inside
- "I Need Love", by 'N Sync from *NSYNC
- "I Need Love", by Robin Thicke from The Evolution of Robin Thicke
- "I Need Love", by Sam Phillips from Martinis and Bikinis
- "I Need Love", by Sandra from Close to Seven
