= Uncomfortable (disambiguation) =

Being uncomfortable means feeling the lack of comfort.

Uncomfortable may also refer to:

- Uncomfortable (album), a Christian hip-hop album by Andy Mineo
- Uncomfortable (song), a 2018 single by American hardrock band Halestorm
