= Alien (Beam album) =

Studio album by Beam
- Released: 4 February 2022
- Genre: Dancehall; trap
- Length: 60:10
- Label: Epic
- Producer: Adam MacDougall; Al Cres; Angelo Arce; Azul; Bass Charity; Beam; Ben Billions; BlakeSale; Boi-1da; Bongo; Cadenza; Cardo; Carlton McDowell; ChaseTheMoney; Compose; Cubeatz; Dim Cruz; Dutchboi; Gray Hawken; Jahaan Sweet; Johnny Juliano; Keanu Beats; Larrance Dopson; Nathan Butts; Pyrex; Reid Waters; SkipOnDaBeat; Skrillex; Smash David; Stephen Fealy III; Timmy; Wallis Lane; Yung Exclusive

Beam chronology
Crimson Soundtrack (2020)	Alien (2022)

Singles from Alien
- 1. "Anxiety" Released: 19 November 2021; 2. "Win" Released: 14 January 2022; 3. "Planet Beam" Released: 4 February 2022

Alien is the debut studio album by Jamaican-American rapper and singer Beam. It was released on February 4, 2022 by Epic Records. The album features guest appearances from Vory, Zacari, Justin Bieber, Jorja Smith, Landstrip Chip, Papa San (Beam's father), and Valee. Production was handled by Beam himself, Al Cres, Dutchboi, Nathan Butts, Cubeatz, Pyrex, Smash David, Ben Billions, Cardo, Johnny Juliano, Yung Exclusive, BlakeSale, Bongo, Bass Charity, Azul, Gray Hawken, Angelo Arce, Cadenza, Wallis Lane, Stephen Fealy III, Timmy, Keanu Beats, Compose, ChaseTheMoney, Dim Cruz, Reid Waters, Skrillex, Larrance Dopson, Carlton McDowell, Adam MacDougall, Boi-1da, Jahaan Sweet, and SkipOnDaBeat. The album was executive produced by Beam himself, Al Cres, and Whetstone Ent. It was preceded by three singles: "Anxiety", "Win" and "Planet Beam".

== Background ==
Speaking of Alien, Beam said:

I just want people to realize that they are not the only ones who feel alienated in life. Whether that's a good or bad thing, you have to walk a narrow road. You feel alienated because you discern a certain thing that people don't understand. You get to digest a piece of my brain and get to know me on an artistic level with this album.

== Release and promotion ==
On November 12, 2021, Beam announced through social media that the album had been completed. The lead single, "Anxiety", was released exactly one week later, on November 19, 2021. The second single, "Win", was released on January 14, 2022. On February 1, 2022, he teased another song on the album, "Sundown", which features Canadian singer Justin Bieber. The next day, he revealed the album along with its cover art and release date. The tracklist was revealed the day before its release. The third single, "Planet Beam", was released on 4 February, 2022 along with the album.

== Critical reception ==
Writing for DJBooth, Donna-Claire Chesman felt that "entering 'PLANET BEAM' means stepping into a world of discordant sounds that come together as the artist fuses dancehall, trap, and straight bars with danceability, adding that "ALIEN is an even wonkier evolution" as "BEAM darts between genres and sounds confident as ever". Attack the Culture wrote, "A true body of work, the album threads together an unpredictable trip through styles".

== Track listing ==
Alien track listing
No.	Title	Writer(s)	Producer(s)	Length
1.	"Pilot"	Tyshane Thompson	Al Cres; Dutchboi; Nathan Butts	1:43
2.	"Anxiety"	Tys. Thompson; Almondo Cresso	Cubeatz; Pyrex	2:16
3.	"30mgs" (featuring Vory)	Tys. Thompson; Tavoris Hollins, Jr.; Gabriel Tavarez	Smash David; Ben Billions	3:32
4.	"Working"	Tys. Thompson; Hollins	Cardo; Johnny Juliano; Yung Exclusive	2:32
5.	"Ice Cola"	Tys. Thompson; Jordan Douglas	Beam; Al Cres; Dutchboi; BlakeSale	2:56
6.	"Hurt People" (featuring Zacari)	Tys. Thompson; Zacari Pacaldo; Douglas	Bongo	3:38
7.	"Sundown" (featuring Justin Bieber)	Tys. Thompson; Justin Bieber; Jonathan Bezianis; Sergio Escorcia, Jr.; Douglas	Al Cres; Dutchboi; Bass Charity; Azul; Gray Hawken	3:43
8.	"Conscience" (featuring Jorja Smith)	Tys. Thompson; Jorja Smith; Oliver Rodigan; Douglas	Al Cres; Angelo Arce; Cadenza; Wallis Lane	3:14
9.	"Win"	Tys. Thompson; Douglas; Omar Souffrant	BlakeSale; Stephen Fealy III; Timmy	2:49
10.	"Akira Pt. 1 & 2" (featuring Landstrip Chip)	Tys. Thompson; Jordan Holt-May	Cardo; Dutchboi; Butts; BlakeSale; Keanu Beats	4:16
11.	"2nd Samuel" (featuring Papa San)	Tys. Thompson; Tyrone Thompson; Tamry Curry; Douglas	Al Cres; Dutchboi; Butts	3:24
12.	"Friends"	Tys. Thompson; Tasan Thompson; Ashante Reid	Al Cres; Butts; BlakeSale; Cadenza; Compose	3:25
13.	"Blood Money"	Tys. Thompson; Douglas	Al Cres; BlakeSale; ChaseTheMoney	2:33
14.	"Hi Tech" (featuring Valee)	Tys. Thompson; Valee Taylor; Douglas	ChaseTheMoney	3:12
15.	"PDF"	Tys. Thompson; Thomas Pentz; Adidja Palmer; Nick van de Wall; David Taylor	Beam; Al Cres	2:08
16.	"Pu$$y Dream"	Tys. Thompson; Douglas; Bezianis; Simon Plummer	Dutchboi; Dim Cruz; Reid Waters	2:44
17.	"Oh Sleep"	Tys. Thompson; Escorcia; Plummer; Andrew Thompson	Beam; Azul	2:32
18.	"Blessings"	Tys. Thompson; Douglas; Dimitri McDowell	Skrillex; Larrance Dopson; Al Cres; Carlton McDowell; Adam MacDougall	3:00
19.	"Planet Beam"	Tys. Thompson; Sean Myers	Boi-1da; Al Cres; Bongo; Jahaan Sweet; SkipOnDaBeat	6:22
Total length:				60:10

Notes

- All tracks are stylized in all caps.

Sample credits

- "PDF" contains samples from "Pon de Floor", written by Thomas Pentz, Adidja Palmer, and Nick van de Wall, as performed by Diplo featuring Vybz Kartel and Afrojack.
