= Al Cres =

American songwriter, producer

- Born: Almando Cresso; Florida, United States
- Genres: Hip-hop; ccm; dancehall; reggae
- Occupations: Songwriter; producer; drummer
- Label: UMPG

Almando Cresso, better known by his stage names Al Cres and Don Wolfe, is an American songwriter and record producer who contributed to Beyoncé album Renaissance, co-writing "Energy", as well as various Beam projects, albums from gospel artist Trip Lee, and DJ Khaled album Khaled Khaled.

== Career ==
=== Musical beginnings ===
Cresso, a native Floridian, was recruited in 2019 by rapper-producer Beam to join a Miami recording camp for his major-label debut EP 95 on Epic Records, forming a prolonged working relationship. Cresso has since appeared on subsequent Beam projects Crimson Soundtrack and debut album Alien.

== Selected songwriting & production credits ==
Title	Year	Artist	Album
"Tiny" (featuring Beam & Shenseea)	2020	Major Lazer	Music Is the Weapon
"Try Me If You Want"	2020	Vory	Vory
"Let It Go" (featuring Justin Bieber & 21 Savage)	2021	DJ Khaled	Khaled Khaled
"Pilot"	2021	Beam	Alien
"Anxiety"	2021	Beam	Alien
"Ice Cola"	2021	Beam	Alien
"Sundown" (featuring Justin Bieber)	2021	Beam	Alien
"Conscience" (featuring Jorja Smith)	2021	Beam	Alien
"2nd Samuel" (featuring Papa San)	2021	Beam	Alien
"Friends"	2021	Beam	Alien
"Blood Money"	2021	Beam	Alien
"PDF"	2021	Beam	Alien
"Blessings"	2021	Beam	Alien
"Planet Beam"	2021	Beam	Alien
"Butterflight"	2021	Zacari	Sol
"Energy" (featuring Beam)	2022	Beyoncé	Renaissance
"Contra la Corriente"	2022	Anuel AA	LLNM2
"Anuel & Emmanuel"	2022	Anuel AA	LLNM2
"Demand My Respect"	2022	Kodak Black	Kutthroat Bill: Vol. 1
"Link Up" (with Don Toliver & Wizkid featuring Beam & Toian)	2023	Metro Boomin	Spider-Man: Across the Spider-Verse (soundtrack)
"Automobooty" (featuring Lola Brooke & Modesty)	2023	NLE Choppa	Cottonwood 2
"Most Beautiful Design" (with Future & London on da Track)	2024	Coco Jones	Why Not More?
"Top Toppa (Intro)"	2024	Stefflon Don	Island 54
"Nice Guy" (featuring Tyla)	2025	Cardi B	Am I the Drama?

== Awards and nominations ==
Year	Ceremony	Award	Result	Ref
2017	48th GMA Dove Awards	Best Rap/Hip-Hop Album (The Waiting Room)	Won	
2023	54th GMA Dove Awards	Best Rap/Hip-Hop Album (New Hollywood)	Nominated	
2023	65th Annual Grammy Awards	Album of the Year (Renaissance)	Nominated	
