= Misfits 2 =

Studio album by Social Club
- Released: April 29, 2014
- Genre: Christian hip hop
- Length: 39:45
- Label: Social Club

Social Club chronology
Summer of George (2013)	Misfits 2 (2014)	Us (2015)

Misfits 2 is the third studio album from Christian hip hop duo Social Club, and it was self-released on April 29, 2014.

== Critical reception ==
Professional ratings
Review scores
Source	Rating
New Release Tuesday	5/5 stars

At New Release Tuesday, Mark Ryan rated the album a perfect five stars, stating that "This album is perplexing, there will be people that love it and people that don't care for it." In addition, Ryan wrote that "At first listen Misfits 2 is light and flaky like a Tenderflake pie crust... but upon listening closer it is deep and rich like a chocolate bobka."

== Chart performance ==
For the Billboard charting week of May 17, 2014, Misfits 2 ranked No. 59 on the Billboard 200 albums chart, and it reached Nos. 6 and 3 on the Christian Albums and Gospel Albums charts, respectively. It also was the No. 10 on the Rap Albums chart that same week and No. 14 on the Independent Albums chart. The album has 10,000 copies in the US as of March 2015.

== Track listing ==
Tracklist
No.	Title	Producer (s)	Length
1.	"Misfits" (featuring Chris Durso)	D-Flow	2:30
2.	"Coogi Sweater" (featuring Andy Mineo & SPZRKT)	Gawvi	4:33
3.	"Awkward Pt2" (featuring Abiv)	Abiv and Rey King	4:25
4.	"Cops"	Gawvi	2:55
5.	"No Sleep" (featuring Rey King)	Rey King and D-Flow	4:52
6.	"Mxsfits Lxvin" (featuring Elhae)	D-Flow	4:14
7.	"My Eyes Burn" (featuring Marz Ferrer)	Rey King and D-Flow	4:19
8.	"Burn the Bridge" (featuring Chris Batson)	Chris Batson and D-Flow	3:41
9.	"My Life (Santinos Theme)"	D-Flow	3:57
10.	"Social Club Is Not Dead" (featuring Gawvi)	Gawvi	4:19
Total length:			39:45

== Chart performance ==
Chart (2014)	Peak position
US Billboard 200	59
US Christian Albums (Billboard)	6
US Top Gospel Albums (Billboard)	3
US Independent Albums (Billboard)	14
US Top Rap Albums (Billboard)	10
