= Coming In Hot =

Single by Lecrae and Andy Mineo

from the album Summer Eighteen
- Released: July 19, 2018
- Recorded: 2018
- Genre: Christian hip hop
- Length: 3:20
- Label: Reach Records
- Composers: Lecrae Moore; Shama Joseph; Brian Taylor; Andrew Mineo; Lasanna Harris; Marlon Montgomery; Glen Henry; John Itiola
- Producer: Shama "Sak Pase" Joseph

Andy Mineo singles chronology
"You Can't Stop Me (Remix)" (2018)	"Coming In Hot" (2018)	"Coquito" (2018)

Lecrae singles chronology
"Fight For Me" (2018)	"Coming In Hot" (2018)	"Joy" (2018)

Music video
- Video on YouTube

"Coming in Hot" is a song by American rappers Lecrae and Andy Mineo. It was originally released as a standalone track and was later included on the Reach Records collaborative album Summer Eighteen. It was produced by record producer and record executive Sak Pase. It was certified RIAA Digital Gold in August 2021, and Digital Platinum in 2023. It also became a viral song on social networks and was used by personalities like Kim Kardashian and Will Smith. It charted on Billboard's Triller US chart and Triller's Global Chart three years after its release.

== Releases ==
The song was originally released on July 19, 2018, as a single by rappers Lecrae and Andy Mineo. It was included on the Reach Records collaborative album Summer Eighteen. In 2019, the official music video was released. In 2020, the song was used in statuses on social networks of well-known public figures such as Kim Kardashian, Will Smith, Stephen Curry, and some others. This caused the song to chart on the Billboard Triller US Chart and the Triller Global Chart, reaching peak positions of #2 and #3, respectively. In May 2021, Reach Records released a 4-song EP of remixes of "Coming in Hot." In August 2021, the track was certified RIAA Digital Gold. "Coming in Hot" was a bonus track on Mineo's 2021 album, Neverland II. On October 16, 2023, it was certified RIAA Digital Platinum.

== Certifications ==
Region	Certification	Certified units/sales
United States (RIAA)	Platinum	1,000,000^{‡}
^{‡} Sales+streaming figures based on certification alone.
