= The Misfit Generation =

EP by Social Club Misfits
- Released: May 6, 2016
- Genre: Hip hop; Christian hip hop
- Length: 20:10
- Label: Capitol CMG

Social Club Misfits chronology
Us (2015)	The Misfit Generation (2016)	The Misadventures of Fern & Marty (2017)

Singles from The Misfit Generation
- 1. "Courage" Released: April 6, 2016

This Misfit Generation is the third extended play from Social Club Misfits. Capitol Christian Music Group released the EP on May 6, 2016, where this was their first release with the label. Production for the EP was handled by Chris Batson, Ray Rock, & Wit.

== Critical reception ==
Professional ratings
Review scores
Source	Rating
Jesus Freak Hideout	4/5 stars 3.5/5 stars
New Release Today	3.5/5 stars
Today's Christian Entertainment	4/5 stars

Awarding the EP four stars at Jesus Freak Hideout, Kevin Hoskins describes, "The beats are solid throughout and Marty and Fern rhyme as well as they have on any previous release." Scott Fryberger, rating the EP three and a half stars for Jesus Freak Hideout, believes, "There's still plenty of merit here, and most of the EP is worthwhile to listen to, so I wouldn't recommend passing it up if you like what the radio plays these days." Giving the EP four stars by Today's Christian Entertainment, Justin Morden suggests, "New and old fans alike should find something to enjoy in this EP. It’s not a perfect record and fans may wish for more, but as we have come to expect, Social Club Misfits does not easily disappoint." Michael Weaver, indicating in a three and a half star review from Jesus Freak Hideout, opines, "The Misfit Generation is worth a listen, but don't expect to have your mind blown. Hopefully, the guys come back strong with their next release." Signaling in a three and a half star review from New Release Today, Mark Ryan says, "Social Club Misfits may have changed their name, but with a larger platform than ever, their unchanging message of hope and accepting yourself as God created you can truly reach a new generation of misfits."

== Track listing ==
No.	Title	Length
1.	"Wavemasters" (featuring Aha Gazelle & Chris Durso)	3:37
2.	"Marriage Goals"	3:19
3.	"Courage" (featuring Tree Giants)	4:51
4.	"Kumbaya"	3:50
5.	"The Misfit Generation" (featuring Chris Batson)	4:37
Total length:		20:10

== Chart performance ==
Chart (2016)	Peak position
US Christian Albums (Billboard)	4
US Top Rap Albums (Billboard)	8
