= Heroes for Sale (Andy Mineo album) =

Studio album by Andy Mineo
- Released: April 16, 2013
- Genre: Christian hip hop, progressive hip hop
- Length: 60:05
- Label: Reach
- Producer: 808&Elite, Alex Medina, Andy Mineo, Chris Morgan, D-Flow (The Brassman), Dirty Rice, Gawvi, GROC, Heat Academy, Jeremey S. H. Griffith, Joseph Prielozny, J.R., Skrip, ThaInnaCircle, TheBridge, Tyshane

Andy Mineo chronology
Saturday Morning Car-Tunez (2012)	Heroes for Sale (2013)	Never Land (2014)

Singles from Heroes for Sale
- 1. "AYO!" Released: January 28, 2013; 2. "Bitter" Released: March 5, 2013; 3. "You Will" Released: April 02, 2013

Heroes for Sale is the debut studio album by American Christian hip hop artist Andy Mineo, released on April 16, 2013. It follows up Mineo's 2011 mixtape Formerly Known. Considered one of the most anticipated Christian hip hop albums of 2013, Heroes for Sale includes features from Lecrae, Trip Lee, KB, Christon Gray, Krizz Kaliko, and for KING & COUNTRY among others. Three singles were released for the album, "AYO!" on January 28, 2013, "Bitter" on March 5, 2013, and "You Will" on April 2, 2013. A music video for "AYO!" came out on January 31, a three-part webseries was launched on February 6, and a documentary entitled "Everything Must Go" was released on April 9. Lyrically, Mineo based the album concept around the brokenness of human heroes, and the album has a very transparent and personal tone. Stylistically, it mixes electronic-influenced hip hop music with a variety of other genres, including hymns, reggaeton, jazz, R&B, heavy metal, classical, dubstep, second line, acid jazz, psychedelic funk, and jack swing. The album debuted at No. 11 on the Billboard 200, No. 4 on Top Rap Albums chart, No. 1 on the US Top Christian Albums and No. 2 on the UK Top Christianhart.

== Promotion and marketing ==
Mineo announced the album cover and release date, April 16, 2013, as well as releasing a short promo with footage from the photo-shoot, on January 8, 2013 On January 28, 2013, Mineo released the lead single, "AYO!", and a music video followed three days later. On February 6, 2013, Reach Records released the first episode of a three-part short promotional webseries "Heroes For Sale", starring Andy Mineo. The second episode followed on February 20. On March fifth, he dropped the single "Bitter", a re-working of the original version that Mineo released in 2010 under his former stage name C-Lite. Reach Records released another promotional film, this time a live recording of a spontaneous dance party initiated by Mineo on a subway to the song "Uno Uno Seis" from Heroes for Sale, on March 20. The final episode of the "Heroes for Sale" webseries came out on March 29, and a third single from the album dropped on April 2. On April 9, Reach Records released a documentary, entitled "Everything Must Go", about Mineo's experiences of recording his album while touring with 116 Clique on the Unashamed 2012: Come Alive tour.

== Lyrics and style ==
Andy Mineo stated that the concept behind the album is that "we make heroes out of a lot of things. We make heroes out of people. We believe ourselves to be greater than we really are. We make ourselves look like heroes to other people. What I really wanted to do is show the brokenness of the heroes that we create and the heroes that we try to be in order to show that there is ultimately only one great hero." Andrea Williams of Breathcast called the album "an autobiographical work that reveals an in-depth look into the heart and soul of a true Christ-lover who has faced the challenges of a fallen world head-on." Mark Rice of Jesus Freak Hideout stated that Mineo's rapping delivers "transparent, witty, and at times confrontational lyrics thematically centered around making sinful humans your heroes." Nyon Smith of Rapzilla said that the hymn "Come, Ye Sinners, Poor and Needy" in the first track "Superhuman" sets the stage "for an extremely personable album, blended seamlessly with a distorted guitar that lends to the idea of evangelism even in the darkest of places." The songs "Bitter" and "Shallow" continue this transparency, with the former featuring a thirty-second sample of a voice mail from Mineo's estranged father. "Wild Things" deals with the sacred-secular divide and addresses Christian maturity a topic very rarely touched in Christian hip hop, according to Nyon. Nyon called the final trilogy of songs, "Still Bleeding", "Tug of War", and "Death Has Died", an emotional roller-coaster. "Still Bleeding" deals with hurtful words, "Tug of War" with the difficulties of surrendering one's "final god," and "Death Has Died" with the insurmountable realization of Jesus's return. On "Tug of War", Krizz Kaliko expresses that he is in the midst of a war for his soul. Nyon explained that "the ministry from an artist to artist standpoint that may get overlooked, is that the Strange Music artist has made songs expressing a desire to want to believe and live for God and this could begin the pouring into what Tech & Krizz have longed for so many years." Near the end of his review, Nyon expressed that the transparency of Mineo "makes it feel as though we should be all be interceding for him," and commented that "if we are truthful, we realize we are no better than our brothers and sisters. We are all in need of grace."

During the album's recording, Mineo described that album as having a "bright" electronic feel and an experimental and progressive sound. Allmusic stated that the album "showcases the rapper's spiritual-themed lyrics and often progressive, electronic-influenced hip hop tracks." Angela Lu of World described the album as a mix of hip hop with reggaeton and jazz. Andrea Williams described the style of the album as "a funky concoction of all of his musical influences, including hymns, heavy metal, hip-hop and classical." Jamie Lee Rake of HM detailed that musically, Heroes for Sale "runs the gamut of styles to complement the differing couplets. Reggaeton, dubstep, New Orleans second line marching band rhythms, acid jazz, psychedelic funk, and jack swing collide and coalesce behind the mic Mineo and his several guests hold." Mark Rice described the album as experimenting with a wide and eclectic variety of styles ranging from reggae to R&B to heavy metal. Rice called the song "AYO!" New York-inspired techno rock and described "Still Bleeding" as featuring a classical symphonic sound. According to Rice, "Caught Dreaming" displays an alternative pop styling, while "Wild Things" is "an almost straight-up heavy metal song, complete with screaming." Nyon Smith called the track "Wild Things" as Mineo's step into heavy metal and described the tracks "Uno Uno Seis", featuring Lecrae, and "The Saints", featuring KB and Trip Lee, as Christian anthems. Nyon considered "Uno Uno Seis" to be "reminiscent of eighties New York "Wild Style" park parties – a feel-good track to tour with that expresses the diversity of the church." According to Nyon, the album contains two songs which play "straight New York," "AYO!" and "Cocky". "AYO!", the album's lead single, Nyon described as the most radio-ready track, and in regard to "Cocky" Nyon stated that "the boom-bap track produced by Skrip has an echoing vocal sample and a monotonous, Terminator-style bass stab that indiscriminately leads to broken necks." The song "Still Bleeding" Nyon called a "chilling track over cinematic orchestration." Anthony Peronto of Christian Music Zine said that "You Will" and "Uno Uno Sies" "unexpectedly have a dance-influence" and that on "Wild Things", the "black sheep" of the album, Mineo's screaming "beats John Cooper's metal-influenced screaming on "Monster" by a long shot[.]" markryan1976 of New Release Tuesday noted the opening jungle drum beat to "Wild Things" before the electric guitar line comes in.

== Artwork and packaging ==
The album artwork was handled by Invisible Creature, a graphic design studio founded by Don and Ryan Clark of the metalcore band Demon Hunter. According to Rapzilla, the album cover was created mostly through practical effects without photo manipulation software.

== Critical reception ==
Professional ratings
Review scores
Source	Rating
Allmusic	3.5/5 stars
CCM Magazine	4/5 stars
Christian Music Zine	4.75/5
ChristCore	5/5 stars
Cross Rhythms	10/10 squares
HM	3.5/5 stars
Jesus Freak Hideout	4/5 stars
Louder Than the Music	4.5/5 stars
New Release Tuesday	5/5 stars
Rapzilla	4/5 stars

Heroes for Sale garnered high praise from music critics. Upon release of Andy Mineo's first single from the album, "AYO!", Rapzilla called Heroes for Sale "definitely the most anticipated album of 2013[!]" Nyon Smith rated the album four out of five, stating that "on his first official retail album, the self-proclaimed nerd-in-glasses rises to the occasion like Wichita State in the Final Four." He said that the intimacy of the album threw him off for a moment, as Mineo's mixtape Formerly Known was not nearly as dark and personal. Nyon finished his review by saying "although well produced, the production at times feels a bit forced or overproduced. And as with most albums, there are a couple of songs that could have been trimmed. Regardless, Heroes For Sale is one of, if not the best album released in 2013 so far." Both reviewers for Jesus Freak Hideout gave the album four stars out of five. Mark Rice said that "there isn't one dull song or misfire in the entire 65 minute runtime of Heroes For Sale," but stated that the darkness, transparency, and bluntness of the album might throw many listeners off, and the heavy content "leaves little room to breathe". Rice also felt that the album lyrically and music-wise was not "anything vastly different from what many are noticing to be the 'Reach Records formula'... ...but Mineo's album is so vastly unique in other aspects that it is hardly a knock against it." Kevin Hoskins felt that the songs "Curious," " Ex Nihilo," and "You Will" served only as filler, but praised the album overall, stating that "all in all, any fan of the rap/hip hop world will want to pick up and will enjoy it thoroughly, despite the handful of minor missteps." markryan1976 of New Release Tuesday rate the album a full five stars, listing the songs "Superhuman", "Ex Nihilo", "AYO!", "Bitter", "Wild Things", and "Uno Uno Seis" as the highlight tracks on the album. He mentioned in his review that "when I first received this to listen to the track order was not yet finalized and I wasn't overly impressed. When the track order was announced and I listened to the album the way the artist intended it to be listened to, the album took on a life." Anthony Peronto for Christian Music Zine rated the album four-point-seventy-five out of five, stating that "I have to be honest and say that Heroes For Sale is the best debut album in Reach Records history." At CCM Magazine, Matt Conner felt that "Heroes for Sale reveal[s] personal intimate details of a life left open, while the varied sounds and styles show Mineo reaching into his big bag of musical tricks." Matt Collar of Allmusic found that the album "showcases the rapper's spiritual-themed lyrics and often progressive, electronic-influenced hip-hop tracks." At HM, Jamie Lee Rake rated the album three-point-five out of five, aiming some criticism at the abundance of sung choruses but nevertheless calling the album "a solid debut" in which Mineo is "transparent to a fault, which is probably his point." Cross Rhythms' Steve Hayes gave the album a full ten squares, proclaiming the album to be "an essential set." At Louder Than the Music, Rich Smith felt that this was "a brilliant debut album and well worth checking out" because the release features "production quality [that] is top notch and really blends and cuts the different styles of hip-hop, R&B and rock well, along with great lyrics and slick raps". Founder Bryce Cooley of ChristCore saying that the release was "Spirit-Filled" on which contains "interesting, and challenging lyrics, set to well produced beats".

== Commercial performance ==
The album debuted at number 11 on the Billboard 200 chart, with first-week sales of 28,000 copies in the United States. In its second week the album sold 4,700 more copies bringing its total to 32,000.

== Track listing ==
No.	Title	Writer(s)	Producer(s)	Length
1.	"Superhuman"	Keith Cook, Danika Lukasiewicz, Chris Mackey, Andy Mineo, Joseph Prielozny	Joseph Prielozny and Dirty Rice	5:00
2.	"Ex Nihilo" (featuring Christon Gray)	Christon Gray, Mineo, Courtney Peebles	J.R. for So Hot Productions	3:33
3.	"AYO!"	Mineo, Peebles	J.R.	4:03
4.	"You Will"	Gabriel Azucena, Kameron Glasper, Mineo	Gawvi	4:09
5.	"The Saints" (featuring KB &Trip Lee)	Kevin Burgess, William L. Barefield III, Mineo, George Ramirez	GROC for Beat Mekanickz	3:58
6.	"Caught Dreaming" (featuring for KING & COUNTRY)	Jeremy Griffith, Mineo, Peebles, Joel Smallbone, Luke Smallbone	Jeremey S. H. Griffith, Andy Mineo, and J.R.	4:04
7.	"Bitter"	Alex Medina, Mineo, Abraham Olaleye	Alex Medina and D-Flow (The Brassman)	3:39
8.	"Shallow" (featuring Swoope)	Matthew Massaro, Mineo, Prielozny, Allen Swoope, Benjamin Leroy Thom, Tyshane Thompson	808 & Elite, Joseph Prielozny (additional), and Andy Mineo (additional)	4:46
9.	"Wild Things"	Michael Jefferson, Mineo, Derrick Omondi Okoth, Prielozny, Thompson	Tyshane, ThaInnaCircle, and Joseph Prielozny	3:43
10.	"Take Me Alive"	Mineo, Thompson	Tyshane	3:24
11.	"Uno Uno Seis" (featuring Derek Minor (uncredited) & Lecrae)	Derek Johnson, Medina, Mineo, Lecrae Moore	Alex Medina and Andy Mineo (additional)	4:33
12.	"Cocky"	Skrip Adriel Cruz, Mineo	Skrip	3:16
13.	"Curious"	Billy Dorsey, Dunlap Exclusive, Torrance Esmond, Phillip D. Guillory, Telford Birmingham Ii, Mineo, Tyler Rohn	TheBridge Tyler Rohn and Heat Academy	4:26
14.	"Still Bleeding" (featuring Co Campbell)	Co Campbell, Mineo, Chris Morgan, Prielozny	Andy Mineo, Chris Morgan, Joseph Prielozny (additional)	4:06
15.	"Tug Of War" (featuring Krizz Kaliko)	Dunlap Exclusive, Esmond, Mineo, Krizz Kaliko	Heat Academy	4:32
16.	"Death Has Died"	Tim Dillon, Mineo, Peebles	J.R.	3:58
Total length:				65:10

== Charts ==
Chart	Peak position
US	11
US Rap	4
US Christian	1
UK Christian	2
US Gospel	1
US Digital	6
US Independent	2
