= Wordsplayed =

American rapper

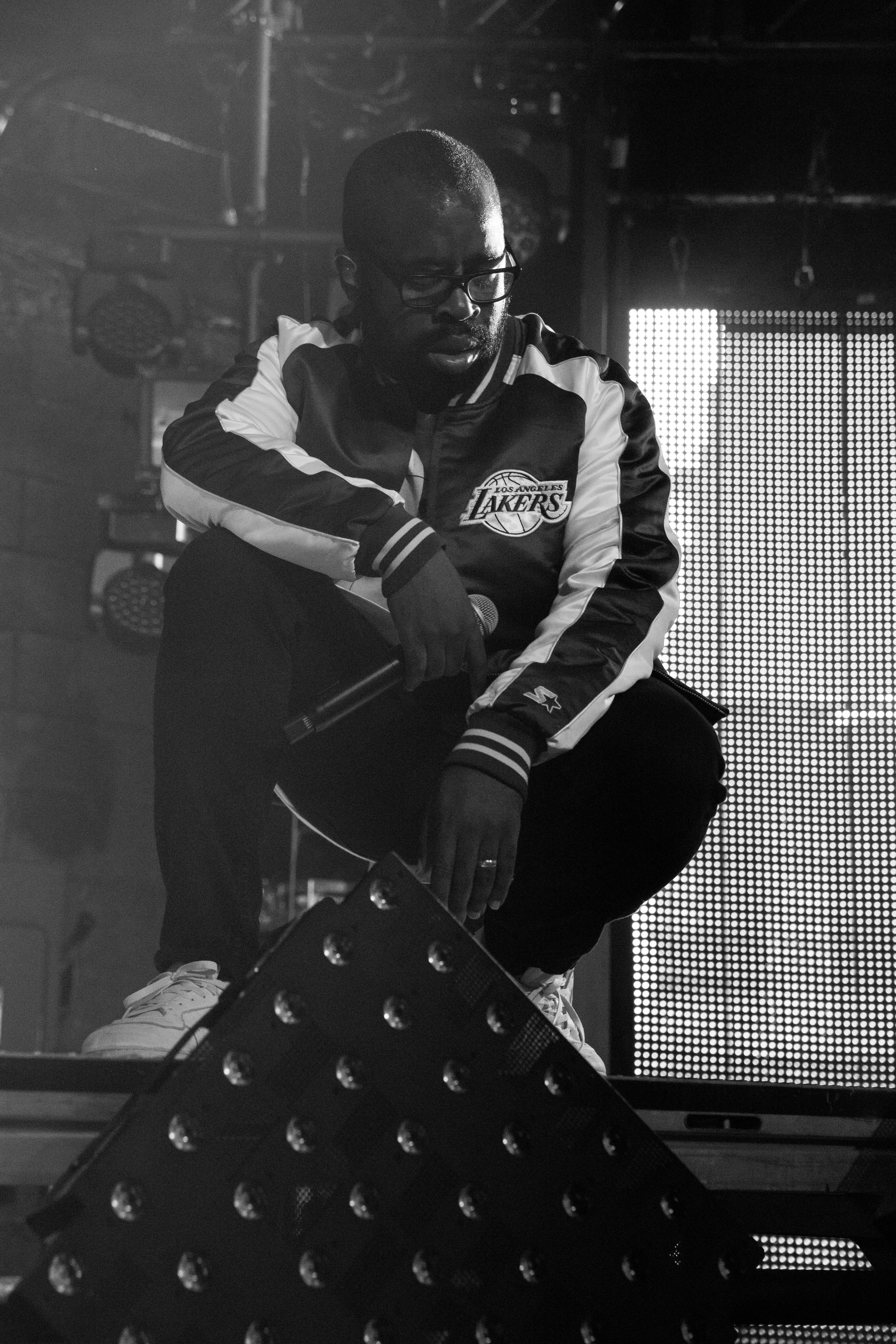
- Wordsplayed performing at Irving Plaza (2017, Friends & Family Tour)

Background information
- Also known as: Magic
- Born: John Itiola; 13 June 1979 (age 47); Nigeria
- Genres: Gospel, CCM, hip hop, drum and bass
- Occupations: Christian rapper, songwriter and author
- Years active: 2008–present
- Label: Miner League
- Member of: Magic and Bird
- Website: wordsplayed.neocities.org

John Itiola, also known as Wordsplayed, is a Christian rapper based in San Diego. His style is influenced by trap music. He has made album appearances for artists like Andy Mineo (C-Lite), GAWVI and Social Club Misfits.

== Biography ==
Wordsplayed was born to Nigerian immigrants who moved to the United States in the early 1980s. He grew up in Long Island, New York.

In 2008, he became friends with members of the evangelical hip-hop ministry T.R.U.C.E. (To Reach Urban Communities Everywhere), which included the rapper Andy Mineo, who gave Itiola a guest spot (credited as John "Word Up" Itiola) on his 2009 Sin Is Wack mixtape. He has also previously worked with Beleaf and Ruslan of the Dream Junkies and formerly of theBreax, on the songs “Drag ‘Em” and “That’s Me” respectively.

Itiola also joined Mineo's artist collective Miner League. Itiola released his debut single as Wordsplayed, "Martinelli's (ft. Andy Mineo)," on December 29, 2014 and "Sammy Sosa" on April 11, 2015. Itiola collaborated on the Marty's album (Social Club) in the song "The One with my Friends" alongside NF, John Givez, Fern and Kaleb Mitchell.

In 2016, he debuted with the mixtape Clowntown, which was released by Miner League and hit number 35 on Billboard's Top Christian Albums chart. Also, he was a special guest with Social Club Misfits in "Friends & Family Tour" of Andy Mineo.

In 2017, Itiola and Mineo teamed up for Andy Mineo & Wordsplayed Present Magic & Bird, on August 4, 2017. The full-length collaboration debuted at number 49 on the all-genre Billboard 200. This album had 5 songs on the Billboard's "Hot Christian Songs" chart.

His latest releases, Lo-Fi Love 1 (LFL1) and Lo-Fi Love 2 (LFL2), have been paired with his “Lo-Fidelity Hour” and "Lo-Fidelity Nights Uncut" direct to public access television series, respectively.

In 2019, was a guest on NBC’s ‘Off The Dribble’ on ‘NBA Hot Takes’ segment.

In April 2020, he launched a podcast called "Circle of Trust", with the intention of "building a global network of people with positive, successful and like-minded ideas."

== Discography ==
=== Solo albums ===
Title	Album details	Positions			
Title	Album details	US	US Christ	US Rap	US R&B /HH
Clowntown	Release date: March 24, 2016; Label: Miner League; Formats: CD, LP, digital download	49	35	23	28
Lo-Fi Love 1 (LFL1)	Release date: June 1, 2018; Label: Miner League; Formats: CD, LP, digital download	-	22	-	-
Lo-Fi Love 2 (LFL2)	Release date: October 5, 2018; Label: Miner League; Formats: CD, LP, digital download	-	-	-	-

=== Collaborative albums ===
Title	Album details	Positions			
Title	Album details	US	US Christ	US Rap	US R&B /HH
Andy Mineo and Wordsplayed present: Magic & Bird	Release date: August 4, 2017; Label: Reach Records; Formats: CD, LP, digital download	49	1	23	28
