= Energy (Beyoncé song) =

Song by Beyoncé featuring Beam

from the album Renaissance
- Released: July 29, 2022
- Studio: Kings Landing West, The Juicy Juicy and Parkwood West, Los Angeles
- Genre: Afrobeats; house
- Length: 1:56
- Label: Parkwood; Columbia
- Songwriters: Beyoncé; Tyshane Thompson; Sonny Moore; Almando Cresso; Jordan Douglas; Tizita Makuria; Denisia Andrews; Brittany Coney; Terius Nash; Mary Brockert; Allen McGrier; Pharrell Williams; Chad Hugo; Adam Pigott; Freddie Ross
- Producers: Beyoncé; Beam; Skrillex; Al Cres

Lyric video
- "Energy" on YouTube

"Energy" is a song by American singer Beyoncé featuring Jamaican rapper Beam. It is the fifth track on the former's seventh studio album Renaissance (2022), which was released on July 29, 2022, through Parkwood and Columbia. The song serves as an interlude between "Cuff It" and "Break My Soul".

== Controversy ==
American singer and songwriter Kelis, whose 2003 single "Milkshake" was interpolated on "Energy", criticized Beyoncé for not notifying her in advance, calling its use a "theft" and saying that she felt "disrespect and utter ignorance" were displayed both by Beyoncé and by Pharrell Williams and Chad Hugo of the Neptunes. Both Williams and Hugo were credited on "Energy" for writing and producing "Milkshake". The interpolation of "Milkshake" was later removed from the song on streaming services following Kelis' unhappiness about not being notified about the use of "Milkshake" in "Energy". Kelis subsequently stated that she was "actually [happy]" with that outcome. Other artists who were sampled on the album thanked Beyoncé for referencing their contributions, particularly emphasizing the album's role in honoring Black queer and trans culture. They include Ts Madison, whose viral video clip "Bitch, I'm Black" is sampled on "Cozy"; Robin S., whose 1990 house hit "Show Me Love" is credited on lead single "Break My Soul"; Kevin Aviance, whose song "Cunty" is sampled on "Pure/Honey"; and ballroom commentator Kevin Jz Prodigy, whose chants are borrowed from the 2009 DJ MikeQ track "Feels Like" on "Pure/Honey".

== Critical reception ==
Pitchfork critic Julianne Escobedo Shepherd wrote that lyrically the song is "minimal and onomatopoeic" and the words are "in service to the vibe, a melodic extension of percussion". Kyle Denis of Billboard found that it is "a support beam for neighboring songs, and still a grand ole time in its own right" thanks to "one of the most talked-about lyrics on the album" for the phrase "Cause them Karens just turned into terrorists". The Guardian writer Tara Joshi selected "Energy" as the example of the "flow as a continuous mix" of the album.

== Commercial performance ==
After the release of Renaissance, "Energy" debuted on the Billboard Hot 100 chart at number 27 and on the Hot R&B/Hip-Hop Songs chart at number 12.

== Live performance ==
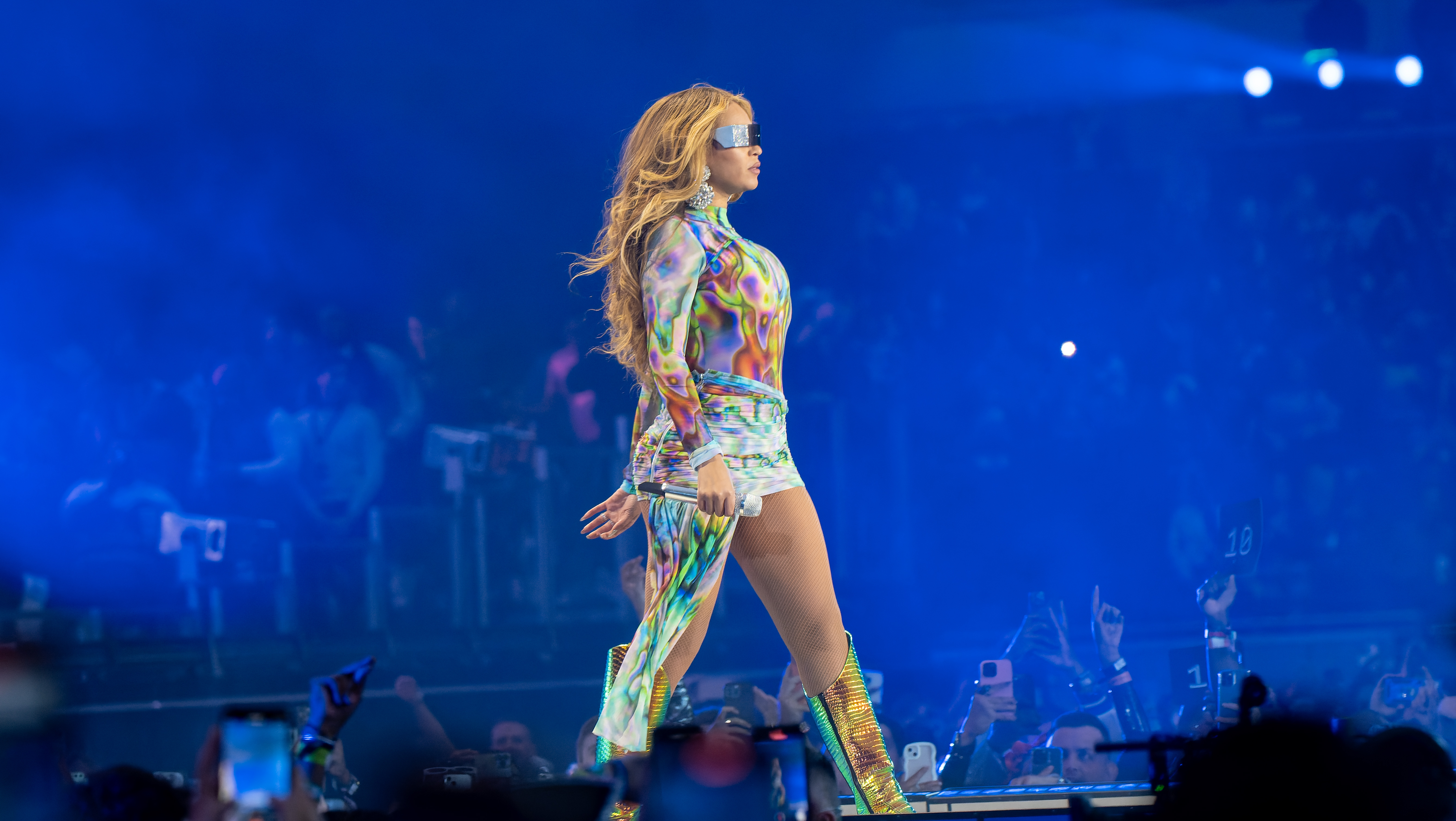
Beyoncé performing "Energy" on the Renaissance World Tour in 2023

Beyoncé first performed "Energy" on the Renaissance World Tour (2023), with the opening night taking place in Stockholm, Sweden. The song was performed during the "Motherboard" act of the tour, following "Cuff It". The "Wetter" remix of "Cuff It" served as a transition between the two songs, with it being sung over the instrumental of "Energy", which included elements of "End of Time" and "Love You Down". Beyoncé's dancers are seen walking down in poses, before strutting down the catwalk towards the secondary stage. Before the chorus, when Beyoncé sings the lyric "look around, everybody on mute", the music goes silent for a couple seconds, leading fans to make a challenge to see which tour date's audiences could stay "on mute" the longest. This would be referred as the "mute challenge". At the end of the performance, the original interpolations of "Milkshake" are heard before the song seamlessly transitions into "Break My Soul" like it does on the album.

"Energy" was performed on the first four of the six London concerts and the second concert in Las Vegas during the Cowboy Carter Tour in 2025. The song immediately followed "Alien Superstar" and contained elements of Destiny's Child's "Lose My Breath." At the tour's final show at Allegiant Stadium, Beyoncé's former groupmates Kelly Rowland and Michelle Williams joined her on stage to perform "Energy" along with "Bootylicious" and the aforementioned "Lose My Breath," to the surprise of her fans in the audience.

== Personnel and credits ==
=== Samples ===
- contains an interpolation of "Ooh La La La", written by Mary Brockert and Allen McGrier and performed by Teena Marie
- contains a sample of "Explode", written by Freddie Ross and Adam Piggot and performed by Big Freedia.
- contains an interpolation of "Milkshake", written by Pharrell Williams and Chad Hugo and performed by Kelis (later removed on digital and streaming versions).

=== Recording locations ===
- The Juicy Juicy (Los Angeles, California)
- Kings Landing West (Los Angeles, California)
- Parkwood West (Los Angeles, California)

=== Personnel ===
Performers

- Vocals by Beyoncé and Beam
- Additional vocals by Big Freedia
- Beam – drums
- Al Cres – drums
- NovaWav – additional synths
- Skrillex – drums

Technical credits

- Beam – production
- Beyoncé – production, vocal production
- Matheus Braz – assistant engineering
- Chi Coney – engineering
- Al Cres – production
- John Cranfield – engineering
- Brandon Harding – engineering
- NovaWav – additional production
- Andrea Roberts – engineering
- Skrillex – production
- Stuart White – mixing, recording

== Charts ==
Weekly chart performance for "Energy"
Chart (2022)	Peak position
Australia (ARIA)	42
Canada Hot 100 (Billboard)	46
France (SNEP)	97
Global 200 (Billboard)	23
New Zealand (Recorded Music NZ)	40
Portugal (AFP)	54
South Africa Streaming (TOSAC)	8
US Billboard Hot 100	27
US Hot R&B/Hip-Hop Songs (Billboard)	12

== Certifications ==
Region	Certification	Certified units/sales
Brazil (Pro-Música Brasil)	3× Platinum	120,000^{‡}
Canada (Music Canada)	Gold	40,000^{‡}
United Kingdom (BPI)	Silver	200,000^{‡}
United States (RIAA)	Gold	500,000^{‡}
^{‡} Sales+streaming figures based on certification alone.
