= The And =

Studio album by Andy Mineo
- Released: November 21, 2025
- Genre: Hip hop
- Length: 29:36
- Label: Miner Leage; Stem
- Producer: Thearthus "Theory Hazit" Washington; Mineo; Blaine Taylor; Edsclusive; Andrew Prim; Ex Deo; Weathrman; Digis Jose Mustafa; Joel McNeill; Malike Baptiste; Dylan Hyde; Morgan

Andy Mineo chronology
Never Land II (2021)	The And (2025)	Magic & Bird 2: What a Rush! (2026)

Singles from The And
- 1. "Red Room (Freestyle)" Released: October 11, 2024; 2. "I Swear, This Is Not an André 3000 Diss Song" Released: June 27, 2025; 3. "Okayyy We Back" Released: July 18, 2025

The And is the fourth album recorded by American hip hop musician Andy Mineo. It was released on November 21, 2025, via Miner League Recordings and Tapes and Stem Record, to digital download and streaming formats. The album was Mineo's first full-length album to be released following a three-year hiatus. It also marks Mineo's first album released independent of Reach Records, after being signed to the label for over a decade.

The And was supported by the release of three singles, "Red Room (Freestyle)" on October 11, 2024, "I Swear, This Is Not an André 3000 Diss Song" on June 27, 2025, and "Okayyy We Back" on July 18, 2025. The album features guest appearances from Mark Morrison, Blaine Taylor, and Jon Keith. It was produced by Thearthus "Theory Hazit" Washington, Mineo, Taylor, Edsclusive, Andrew Prim, Ex Deo, Weathrman, Digis Jose Mustafa, Joel McNeill, Malike Baptiste, Dylan Hyde, and Morgan. It features writing credits from Mineo, Morrison, and Baptiste.

== Release and promotion ==
=== For Promotional Use Only ===
On October 11, 2024, "Red Room (Freestyle)" was released as a single, exclusively available to Instagram and YouTube, where it was promoted with a music video. It was announced that it would appear on the mixtape For Promotional Use Only, which would be released on November 29, 2024. When announced, Mineo referred to it as a "warm up as we get ready to release commercial music again." Initially, the mixtape only appeared on YouTube and SoundCloud to avoid copyright issues from sampling. The mixtape was described by Mineo to be "an experimental project with zero expectations", which he created for the purpose of being "completely free to experiment with new sounds without dealing with the limitations of clearing samples". Each of the eight tracks which appeared on For Promotional Use Only also appeared on The And.

With the release of "Red Room (Freestyle)", a website for For Promotional Use Only was released. The website interface was modeled after the design of a GameCube. It featured a player to listen to the songs of the album.

=== Album release ===
On June 26, 2025, after the release of For Promotional Release Only, Mineo teased to Instagram an image of a puppet holding a flute, with the caption, "I swear, this is not an André 3000 diss". The following Friday the song "I Swear, This Is Not an André 3000 Diss Song" was released on June 27, 2025, supported by the release of a music video. "I Swear, This Is Not an André 3000 Diss Song" was speaks on the themes of how André 3000 has not released music in a significant amount of time, and how Mineo is considering retiring as well. The words "the and" were written at the end of the music video.

On July 18, 2025, "Okayyy We Back", a collaboration with Mark Morrison, was released as the album's third and final single.

== Writing and development ==
Rapzilla observed that the album "explores the theological question of whether God can use 'crooked' things to create straight paths", which is demonstrated in the use of "imperfected elements" in the music. The album demonstrates the style of hip hop.

=== Album artwork ===
The album artwork for The And was created by Mustafa.

== Accolades ==
Year	Organization	Nominee / work	Category	Result	Ref.
2025	We Love Awards	"Okayyy We Back" (featuring Mark Morrison)	Rap / Hip Hop Song of the Year	Nominated	

Year-end lists
Publication	Accolade	Rank	Ref.
Jesus Freak Hideout	Micah Smith's Album Picks of 2025	4	

== Track listing ==
All tracks are written by Andy Mineo, unless otherwise noted.

No.	Title	Writer(s)	Producer(s)	Length
1.	"Isamu's Circle"		Mineo; Blaine Taylor; Delgis Jose Mustafa; Thearthur "Theory Hazit" Washington	1:48
2.	"Regular"		Andrew Prim; Mineo; Blain Taylor; Edsclusive; Ex Deo; Weathrman	2:36
3.	"Okayyy We Back" (with Mark Morrison)	Mineo; Morrison	Mineo; Taylor	2:47
4.	"More Lost Than Found"		Mineo; Taylor; Mustafa	2:16
5.	"Heaven's Door"	Taylor	Taylor	0:30
6.	"Play Along" (with Blaine Taylor)	Mineo; Taylor	Mineo; Taylor; Mustafa	2:50
7.	"Grateful Ray's Interlude"		Mustafa	2:36
8.	"Forever" (with Kon Keith)		Prim; Mineo; Taylor; Ex Deo; Joel McNeill	5:10
9.	"Red Room (Freestyle)"		Mustafa	2:51
10.	"I Swear, This Is Not an André 3000 Diss Song"	Mineo; Malike Baptiste	Mineo; Taylor; Mustafa; Baptiste	3:46
11.	"Watch This"		Dylan Hyde; Morgan	2:26
Total length:				29:36

== Personnel ==
Credits adapted from Tidal.

- Andrew Prim – producer (2, 8), composer (2, 8, 10), piano (8)
- Andy Mineo – producer (1–8, 10), writer (1–4, 6–11), vocals, arranger (8, 10), programming (10), recording engineer (10)
- Blaine Taylor – producer (1–6, 8, 10), mixer (1, 3, 5–6, 9–10), composer (2, 4, 8), writer (5–6), vocals (6), arranger (8, 10), masterer (10)
- Delgis Jose Mustafa – producer (1, 4, 6–7, 9–10), arranger (1, 4, 10), composer (10), graphic design
- Dylan Hyde – producer (11), composer (11)
- Edsclusive – producer (2)
- Edward Davaldi – composer (2, 9)
- Ex Deo – producer (2, 8)
- GETMXD – masterer (1–2, 4–9, 11), mixer (2, 4, 7–8, 11)
- Jacob "Biz" Morris – masterer (1–2, 4–9, 11), mixer (2, 4, 7–8, 11)
- James Connor Back – masterer (1–2, 4–9, 11), mixer (2, 4, 7–8, 11)
- James Gabriel Morales – drums (4)
- Joel McNeill – composer (8), bass (8), percussion (8), piano (8), saxophone (8), synthesizer (8),
- Jon Keith – vocals (8)
- Mark Morrison – vocals (3), writer (3)
- Malike Baptiste – producer (10), composer (10), programmer (10), writer (10)
- Raymond Rivera – lyricist (7)
- Ryan Ofei – vocals (8)
- Thearthur "Theory Hazit" Washington – producer (1), composer (1)
- Weathrman – producer (2)
- Zawadi Morro – flute (10)
