= Fern (rapper) =

American rapper

- Also known as: Fern; FERN; F.E.R.N; Fernie
- Born: Fernando Miranda; May 16, 1979 (age 47); Caguas, Puerto Rico
- Genre: Christian hip hop
- Occupation: Rapper
- Instrument: Vocals
- Years active: 2011–present
- Label: Capitol CMG

Fernando Miranda (born May 16, 1979), who goes by Fern and sometimes FERN, F.E.R.N. or Fernie, is a Puerto Rican rapper in the Christian hip hop genre. He is part of the duo Social Club Misfits, together with his partner, Marty Mar. His first EP, 68 and Douglas, was released in 2015. This was his breakthrough release upon the Billboard magazine charts.

== Early life ==
Fern was born as Fernando Miranda on May 16, 1979, and he was raised in Hollywood, Florida, where he and Marty established Social Club.

== Music career ==
Fern's solo music recording career started in 2015, with the EP 68 and Douglas, which was released on December 4, 2015, by Social Club. The EP was his breakthrough release upon the Billboard magazine charts, where it placed on four charts, while it peaked at No. 15 on Christian Albums, No. 21 on Independent Albums, No. 19 on Rap Albums, and No. 5 on Heatseekers Albums.

== Film career ==
In 2017, Fern announced that he was to appear in the film Canal Street. The film was released in 2018.

== Discography ==
=== EPs ===
List of EPs, with selected chart positions
Title	Album details	Peak chart positions			
Title	Album details	US Christ.	US Ind.	US Rap	US Heat.
68 and Douglas	Released: December 4, 2015; Label: Social Club; Formats: CD, digital download	15	21	19	5

=== Mixtapes and Compilations ===
List of Mixtapes and Compilations
Title	Album details	Peak chart positions			
Title	Album details	US Christ.	US Ind.	US Rap	US Heat.
10 Piece Reload	Released: May 11, 2011; Label: Powerful Muzic; Format: Digital download	—	—	—	—
Bridge Wars	Released: December 1, 2011; Label: Queensbridge Records; Format: CD	—	—	—	—
Streets Anthem, Vol. 2	Released: May 5, 2010; Label: Paradox Records; Note: Album by Dox (Doxamillion), FERN appears on track I'm Paid	—	—	—	—
