= Enrique Serpa =

Cuban journalist and writer

Enrique Serpa (15 July 1900 – 2 December 1968) was a Cuban writer, journalist and photographer born in Havana. His first literary work was Felisa y yo.

He had a long and solid friendship with Ernest Hemingway, who praised his works.

== Bibliography ==
- The honey of the hours (poetry), Havana, 1925.
- Fantoches, Chapter 9, "The crime of yesterday", Havana, 1933.
- Felisa and I, Havana, 1937.
- Contraband (novel), Havana, 1938; Prol. by Denia García Ronda, 1975.
- Days of Trinidad, Álvarez-Pita Editions, Havana.
- Vitrina, 1923-1925 (verses), Havana, 1940.
- America at War, Havana, Arrow Press, 1944.
- Notes on the novel in the USSR, Havana, Publications of the Institute of the Cuban-Soviet Cultural Exchange, 1946.
- Presence of Spain, Havana, 1947.
- Party night, Havana, 1951.
- The trap (novel), Buenos Aires, 1956; Havana, 1972, 1974.
- illareñas Conference, Santa Clara, 1962.
- Shark fins (prose notebooks, 2), Havana, 1963.
- The heroic manigua, Cuban Letters, Havana, 1978.
