= Social Club Misfits =

American hip hop group

- Also known as: Social Club (2012–2016)
- Origin: Miami, Florida, U.S.
- Genres: Christian hip hop
- Years active: 2012–present
- Labels: Capitol CMG, Social Club, Good City
- Members: F.E.R.N. (Fernando); Marty (Martin)
- Website: socialclubmisfits.com

Social Club Misfits, known as Social Club from 2012 until 2016, is a Christian hip hop duo from Miami, Florida made up of rappers FERN and Marty Mar. They formed their musical partnership in 2011 and released their first free album, entitled Misfits, on November 27, 2012. Then, the duo released two EPs entitled Misfits-EP, released on March 26, 2013, and Rejects. on April 2, 2013. The latter garnering some charting success. The third free album from the duo came out on September 13, 2013, entitled Summer of George. Their breakthrough album, Misfits 2, was self-released on April 29, 2014, and Us was released on March 24, 2015.

== Background ==
Social Club formed in the middle of 2011 in Miami, Florida. They rebranded themselves as Social Club Misfits in April 2016, when they signed to Capitol Christian Music Group.

== History ==
=== EPs ===
The Christian hip hop duo released their first EP on March 26, 2013, entitled Misfits-EP, but it did not chart. Then, released Rejects. on April 2, 2013, and it saw some commercial charting success on the Billboard Gospel Albums and Christian Albums charts at Nos. 9 and 32 respectively. This occurred on April 20, 2013, charts. The EP was released by Social Club Misfits label. The duo released their third EP, The Misfit Generation, on May 6, 2016, through Capitol Christian Music Group under with their new name, Social Club Misfits.

=== Albums ===
The Christian hip hop duo released two free albums: Misfits on November 27, 2013, and Summer of George on September 13, 2013. Their third album, Misfits 2, released on April 29, 2014, charted at No. 59 on the Billboard 200 on May 17, 2014, and other Billboard charts such as Gospel Albums, Christian Albums, Independent Albums, Rap Albums at Nos. 3, 6, 14 and 10 respectively. Their third project, US, was released March 24, 2015 and charted at No. 9 on the Billboard Rap Albums and other Billboard charts such as Christian Albums, Independent Albums and 200, at Nos 3, 11, and 103, all on April 2, 2015. Their album, Mood // Doom, won the 2020 Dove Award for Rap / Hip-hop Album of the Year.

On Sept 30th, 2022 Social Club Misfits released "everyone loves a come back story", which has gained positive reviews.

== Discography ==
=== Studio albums ===
Title	Details	Peak chart positions				
Title	Details	US	US Rap	US R&B/HH	US Christ	US Gospel
Misfits	Released: November 27, 2012; Label: Social Club; Formats: CD, digital download	—	—	—	—	—
Summer of George	Released: September 13, 2013; Label: Social Club; Formats: CD, digital download	—	—	—	—	—
Misfits 2	Released: April 29, 2014; Label: Social Club; Formats: CD, digital download	59	10	—	6	3
Us	Released: March 24, 2015; Label: Social Club; Formats: CD, digital download	103	9	—	3	—
The Misadventures of Fern & Marty	Released: January 13, 2017; Label: Social Club; Formats: CD, digital download	80	4	6	2	—
Into the Night	Released: February 9, 2018; Label: Capitol CMG; Formats: CD, digital download	— (Note: Into the Night did not enter the Billboard 200, but peaked at No. 85 on the Billboard Top Album Sales)	—	—	5	—
Mood // Doom	Released: December 20, 2019; Label: Capitol CMG; Formats: CD, digital download	—	—	—	—	—
Feared By Hell	Released: October 30, 2020; Label: Capitol CMG; Formats: CD, digital download	—	—	—	37	—
Everyone Loves a Comeback Story	Released: September 30, 2022; Label: Capitol CMG; Formats: CD, digital download	—	—	—	—	—
Misfits 2 (10th anniversary edition)	Released: May 3, 2024; Label: Independent; Formats: CD, digital download	—	—	—	—	—
"—" denotes a recording that did not chart or was not released in that territory.

=== Extended plays ===
Title	Details	Peak chart positions			
Title	Details	US	US Rap	US Christ	US Gospel
Misfits	Released: March 26, 2013; Label: Social Club; Formats: CD, digital download	—	—	—	—
Rejects.	Released: April 2, 2013; Label: Social Club; Formats: CD, digital download	—	—	32	9
The Misfit Generation	Released: May 6, 2016; Label: Capitol CMG; Formats: CD, digital download	— (Note: The Misfit Generation did not enter the Billboard 200, but peaked at No. 84 on the Billboard Top Album Sales)	8	4	—
Mood.	Released: April 5, 2019; Label: Capitol CMG; Formats: CD, digital download	—	—	—	—
Doom.	Released: September 20, 2019; Label: Capitol CMG; Formats: CD, digital download	—	—	50	—
"—" denotes a recording that did not chart or was not released in that territory.

=== Singles ===
Title	Year	Chart positions		Album
Title	Year	US Christ	US Christ Air	Album
"Courage" (with Tree Giants)	2016	49	42	The Misfit Generation
"Dive" (with Beam)	2017	47	—	Into the Night
"Say Goodbye"	2017	—	—	Into the Night
"War Cry" (with Tauren Wells)	2018	32	27	Into the Night
"Tuyo" (with Danny Gokey and Jordin Sparks)	2018	40	27	Into the Night
"Too Bad"	2018	—	—	Non-album single
"Everytime"	2019	— (Note: "Everytime" did not chart on the Hot Christian Songs chart, but peaked at number 28 on the Christian Hot AC/CHR chart.)	—	Mood // Doom
"Testify" (with Crowder)	2019	46	—	Mood // Doom
"Que lo Que"	2019	—	—	Non-album single
"Believe"	2019	—	—	Mood // Doom
"Enough" (with Austin French)	2019	49	—	Mood // Doom
"Is That Okay?"	2020	—	—	Feared by Hell
"Conmigo" (with Jay Kalyl and Samuel Ash)	2020	—	—	Feared by Hell
"Without You" (with Riley Clemmons)	2021	—	—	Feared by Hell
"God On My Side" (with Ty Brasel)	2021	—	—	Feared by Hell
"Luau" (with Hulvey and Juicebangers)	2021	—	—	Feared by Hell
"Who That Is" (with DJ Laz)	2022	—	—	Everyone Loves a Comeback Story
"Rendezvous" (with Torey D'Shaun)	2022	—	—	Everyone Loves a Comeback Story
"Pray" (with Ryan Ellis)	2024	—	—	Non-album single
"GG Freestyle"	2025	—	—	Non-album single
"—" denotes a recording that did not chart

=== Other charted songs ===
Title	Year	Chart positions			Album
Title	Year	US Christ	US Gospel	US Gospel Digital	Album
"Coogi Sweater" (with Andy Mineo)	2014	—	22	11	Misfits 2
"Heavy Hand"	2015	43	—	—	Us
"Sky Lanterns" (with Marissa Jerome)	2015	45	—	—	Us
"Pop Out Revenge" (with Amari)	2016	32	—	—	The Misfit Generation
"Who Else" (with Andy Mineo)	2017	28	—	—	The Misadventures of Fern & Marty
"Vibes Vibes Vibes" (with Aha Gazelle and Chris Duros)	2017	37	—	—	The Misadventures of Fern & Marty
"—" denotes a recording that did not chart
