= Contraband (Naisha song) =

2026 song by Naisha

Song by Naisha featuring Skrillex, Beam, and DiIip

from the EP 911
- Released: August 7, 2026
- Length: 1:51
- Label: Desi Trill Music
- Songwriters: Jordan Douglas; Naisha Bhargabi; Simon Hessman; Sonny Moore; Tyshane Thompson
- Producers: Skrillex; DiIip

"Contraband" (stylized in all caps) is a song by Indian singer Naisha, featuring American record producer Skrillex, Jamaican rapper Beam, and Indian producer DiIip. It was released on August 7, 2026 as the second track from her extended play, 911 (2026).

== Composition ==
Vocals from "Redline Dash", a 2025 song by Skrillex, are heavily interpolated in this track. The song was described as having "bass-heavy production".

== Music video ==
The music video was filmed in Mumbai and directed by Naisha, Ruby Tilley, and Colin Tilley. The video follows Naisha through city streets, crowds and choreographed dance sequences.
