= Contraband (Golden Earring album) =

Studio album by Golden Earring
- Released: December 1976
- Genre: Hard rock; progressive rock
- Length: 38:18
- Label: Polydor (MCA in USA)
- Producer: Golden Earring, John Kriek, Damon Lyon-Shaw

Golden Earring chronology
To the Hilt (1976)	Contraband (1976)	Live (1977)

Alternate USA cover art
- For the USA, Golden Earring's "Contraband" album was repackaged as "Mad love" with a slightly altered track listing.

Singles from Contraband
- 1. "Bombay" Released: 26 November 1976

Professional ratings
Review scores
Source	Rating
Allmusic	4/5 stars

Contraband is an album by Dutch rock band Golden Earring, released in 1976 in Europe and 1977 in the US.

For the US, the album was re-titled Mad Love and the track "Faded Jeans" was omitted and replaced with "I Need Love".

== Track listing ==
=== Contraband (Europe, South Africa) ===
All tracks are written by George Kooymans and Barry Hay.

Side A
No.	Title	Length
1.	"Bombay"	3:52
2.	"Sueleen"	5:40
3.	"Con Man"	7:10

Side B
No.	Title	Length
4.	"Mad Love's Comin'"	7:45
5.	"Fighting Windmills"	4:38
6.	"Faded Jeans"	5:07
7.	"Time's Up"	3:52

=== Mad Love (USA/Canada) ===
Side A
No.	Title	Length
1.	"I Need Love"	6:23
2.	"Sueleen (Sweden)"	5:50
3.	"Mad Love's Comin'"	7:44

Side B
No.	Title	Length
4.	"Bombay"	3:51
5.	"Fightin' Windmills"	4:39
6.	"Con Man"	7:09
7.	"Time's Up"	3:55

== Personnel ==
Golden Earring

- Barry Hay – vocals
- George Kooymans – guitars, vocals
- Eelco Gelling – guitars, slide guitar
- Rinus Gerritsen – bass, vocals
- Cesar Zuiderwijk – drums

Guest musicians

- Robert Jan Stips – piano on "Faded Jeans", Minimoog on "Con Man", string arrangement on "Fightin' Windmills"
- Patricia Paay – vocals
- Nippy Noya – congas

== Production ==
- Producers: Golden Earring, John Kriek, Damon Lyon-Shaw
- Engineer: Robin Freeman
- Mixing: John Kriek, Steve Lillywhite, Damon Lyon-Shaw
- Cutting engineer: Melvyn Abrahams
- String arrangements: Robert Jan Stips
- Coordination: Jan Vermaes
- Art direction: Koos Van Oostrom
- Artwork: Koos Van Oostrom

== Charts ==
Chart (1976–1977)	Peak position
Dutch Albums (Album Top 100)	10
US Billboard 200	182

== Release history ==
Country	Date
Netherlands	December 1976
United Kingdom	March 1977
United States	May 1977
