= Formerly Known =

Mixtape by Andy Mineo
- Released: September 29, 2011
- Genre: Christian hip hop
- Length: 46:21
- Label: Reach
- Producer: 808&Elite, Alex Medina, Andy Mineo, Skrip, Tyshane, CheeseBeats AKA Tha Kracken, Andre "Supaman" Atkinson, Mark Mims, Maurice "First" Tonia, Johnny Juliano, Black Knight, I.D. Labs

Andy Mineo chronology
Sin is Wack (2009)	Formerly Known (2011)	Saturday Morning Car-Tunez (2012)

Formerly Known is the second mixtape by American Christian hip hop artist Andy Mineo, and his first under the Reach Records label. It was released as a free digital download on September 9, 2011. Formerly known as C-Lite, Mineo dropped this stage name when he signed to Reach in July 2011. The album title is based on three concepts: Mineo was formerly known as "C-Lite," God intimately foreknows all of humanity before birth, and Mineo was formerly an enemy of God before his adoption into God's family.

Featured performers on the album include Lecrae, Beleaf of TheBREAX, Co Campbell, Thi'sl, Eshon Burgundy, Sho Baraka, Swoope, Rich Perez, and R-Swift, as well as a comic appearance of professional golfer Bubba Watson. Production was provided by Mineo himself along with Skrip, Alex Medina, and other, uncredited producers such as Tyshane.

== Critical reception ==
Professional ratings
Review scores
Source	Rating
The Christian Manifesto	4.5/5

Formerly Known was received positively by critics. Michael Wildes of The Christian Manifesto scored the mixtape four-point-five out of five and called it "one of the best albums" of the year. Jerome Hill of Jam the Hype Radio was also favorable to the album, stating that "Andy Mineo keeps us flowing with this project with sounds like 'whoop,' showing us that Christian hip-hop is not lame." Hill considered "Let There be Light", featuring Lecrae, a personal favorite. Wildes listed "Fools Gold", featuring Sho Baraka and Swoope, and "Michael Jackson", featuring Thi'sl, Rich Perez, R-Swift, and Bubba Watson, as the two songs which he liked the best. "Michael Jackson" sampled a line from Kanye West and was based around the concept of Christians being former sinners who were "bad real bad Michael Jackson". Wildes noted the humorous intent of the appearance of golfer Bubba Watson and stated that it "closes out a fine project".

== Track listing ==
No.	Title	Producer(s)	Length
1.	"Goodbye" (featuring Eshon Burgundy)		4:03
2.	"Let There Be Light" (featuring Lecrae)	Alex Medina	4:10
3.	"Formerly Known" (featuring Co Campbell)	Andy Mineo	3:24
4.	"Pick It Up" (featuring Beleaf)		3:33
5.	"Young" (featuring KB)	Tyshane	3:55
6.	"Every Word" (featuring Co Campbell)	Andre "Supaman" Atkinson, Mark Mims, Maurice "First" Tonia	3:40
7.	"Whats It All About"	Johnny Juliano	2:20
8.	"Hello World"	Skrip	2:26
9.	"Everyday Thing"	Johnny Juliano	3:06
10.	"Listen"	Skrip	3:05
11.	"Fools Gold" (featuring Sho Baraka and Swoope)	Andy Mineo	4:08
12.	"Whatever Comes"	I.D. Labs	2:59
13.	"Pressure" (featuring Co Campbell)	Black Knight	4:26
14.	"Michael Jackson" (featuring Thi'sl, Rich Perez, Swift, & Bubba Watson)	808&Elite	4:06
Total length:			46:21
