= Uncomfortable (album) =

Studio album by Andy Mineo
- Released: September 18, 2015
- Genre: Christian hip hop
- Length: 44:41
- Label: Reach
- Producer: 42 North, Alex Medina, Black Knight, Daniel Steele, Dirty Rice, Elhae, Gabriel Lambirth, Gawvi, Illmind, Jon Bellion (add.), Joseph Prielozny, Wit, Syk Sense, Andy Mineo

Andy Mineo chronology
Never Land (2014)	Uncomfortable (2015)	Andy Mineo and Wordsplayed Present Magic & Bird (2017)

Uncomfortable is the second studio album by Andy Mineo. The album was released on September 18, 2015, by Reach Records.

== Critical reception ==
Professional ratings
Review scores
Source	Rating
Christ Core	8.5/10
The Christian Beat	4/5 stars
The Christian Manifesto	2.5/5 stars
HipHopDX	3.5/5 stars
Jesus Freak Hideout	4/5 stars
New Release Tuesday	5/5 stars

Awarding the album four stars from Jesus Freak Hideout, Kevin Hoskins states, "Uncomfortable is a good release and Mineo hits home on some serious thoughts for rap fans to consider." Mark Ryan, giving the album five stars at New Release Today, writes, "It is masterfully thought out, and the entire album moves through a progression of many levels of discomfort for the listener." Rating the album three and a half X's for HipHopDX, Franklin Benjamin says, "It is easy to predict how Uncomfortable will be received: powerful and uplifting if you’re into Christian Rap and love Jesus, a well-produced album if you’re not and don’t, and corny if you think waiting to have sex before marriage is the worst invention of all time."

Calvin Moore, indicating in a two and a half star review by The Christian Manifesto, wrote, "Ultimately, Uncomfortable is a disappointment." Signaling in an eight and a half out of ten review at Christ Core, Bryce Cooley recognizes, "Uncomfortable brings a timelessness that will endure". Chris Major, specifying in a four star review by The Christian Beat, replies, "With a mix of thought-provoking lyrics combined with encouragement and a range of beats, Uncomfortable is an ambitious and bold entry into Christian rap and hip hop that convicts, inspires, and encourages."

== Commercial performance ==
The album debuted at number 10 on the Billboard 200 with 35,000 copies sold in its first week.

== Track listing ==
No.	Title	Producer(s)	Length
1.	"Uncomfortable"	Illmind, Gabriel Lambirth, Joseph Prielozny (additional), and Gawvi (additional)	4:00
2.	"Uptown"	Alex Medina, Wit, and Illmind	3:55
3.	"Now I Know"	Chef Byer	3:49
4.	"Desperados" (featuring Mali Music)	Illmind, Gabriel Lambirth, and Gawvi (post-production)	3:36
5.	"Hear My Heart"	Wit, 42 North, Illmind (additional), and Joseph Prielozny (additional)	3:01
6.	"David's Roof"	Wit and 42 North	1:10
7.	"Rat Race" (featuring Jon Bellion)	Illmind and Jon Bellion (additional)	3:13
8.	"Know That's Right"	Black Knight and Illmind	3:47
9.	"Vendetta"	Andy Mineo, Joseph Prielozny, Gawvi, Elhae, Dirty Rice, Alexander Hitchens and Illmind (additional)	4:28
10.	"Ghost"	Syk Sense	4:00
11.	"Love"	Wit, Daniel Steele, and 42 North (additional)	3:08
12.	"Strange Motions" (featuring Willow Stephens)	Wit and 42 North	2:19
13.	"Make Me a Believer" (featuring Mac Powell)	Wit and 42 North	4:23
Total length:			44:41

== Additional credits ==
- "Uncomfortable" contains background vocals performed by Mali Music
- "Uptown" contains uncredited vocals performed by Willow Stephens & Flaco Navaja
- "Now I Know" contains uncredited vocals performed by Dustin "DAB" Bowie & Mr. Talkbox
- "Desperados" contains background vocals performed by BrvndonP & Dre "The Giant" Garcia
- "Hear My Heart" contains uncredited vocals performed by Crystal Nicole
- "David's Roof" contains background vocals performed by Flaco Navaja
- "Know That's Right" contains uncredited vocals performed by Eris Ford
- "Ghost" contains uncredited vocals performed by Xavier Omär
- "Love" contains uncredited vocals performed by Leah Smith
- "Make Me A Believer" contains background vocals performed by Christon Gray & Kelly Shahbazian

== Chart performance ==
Chart (2015)	Peak position
US Billboard 200	10
US Christian Albums (Billboard)	1
US Independent Albums (Billboard)	1
US Top Rap Albums (Billboard)	3
