= Papa San =

Jamaican musical artist (born 1967)

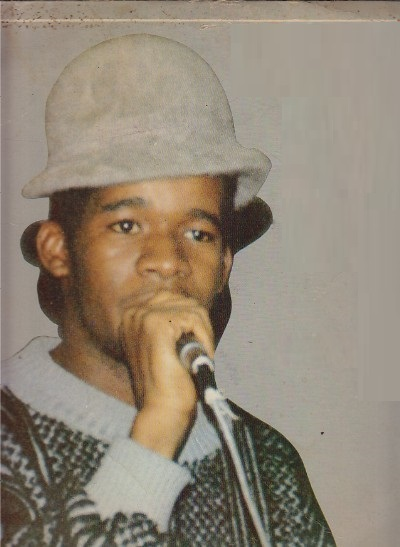
- Papa San in 1988

Background information
- Also known as: Papa San
- Born: Tyrone Thompson; 1 July 1967 (age 58); Kingston, Jamaica
- Origin: Spanish Town, Jamaica
- Genres: Reggae, dancehall, gospel reggae
- Years active: 1978–present
- Website: www.myspace.com/papasanminister

Tyrone Thompson (born 1 July 1967), better known as Papa San, is a Jamaican reggae, dancehall and gospel singer.

== Biography ==
Born in 1967 in Kingston, Jamaica, he was raised by his Rastafarian grandmother and began performing with sound systems (including Stereophonic the Bionic, Black Scorpio and Creation) in the late 1970s. He won the Tastee Talent contest in 1981. He went on to become one of the major dancehall artists of the late 1980s and 1990s, with hits such as "Animal Party", "I Will Survive", "Style and Fashion", "Legal Rights" and "Round Table Talk" feat. Lady G & Maddy Maddy Cry.

His brother and fellow deejay Dirtsman were murdered in 1993. In the three years that followed, his sister was killed in a motorcycle accident, his cousin was killed by police, and he himself had legal problems after being arrested on weapons charges. He turned to Christianity in 1997. This is also reflected in his style, as he started off as a true dancehall deejay, later adopting traits of gospel and Christian music.

Papa San sponsored a concert known as Papa San and Friends, to raise funds for orphanages in rural Jamaica. Since becoming a Christian, he has continued to produce his roots reggae sound, but with the message of Christ to the beat instead of his previously popular secular music.

He has six children and lives in Weston, Florida, with five of them and his wife, Debbie Thompson. In 2011, Papa San and his wife, having been ordained ministers of the Gospel, were launched into pastoral ministry and started Our Fathers Kingdom International Ministries.

In 2013, Papa San featured on Church Clothes, Vol. 2 by Christian hip hop artist Lecrae, with Andy Mineo, on the song "The Fever". Papa San's album One Blood topped the Billboard Reggae Albums Chart in February 2014.

In 2021, he was awarded by ABGMA with the Soca and Urban/R&B/Pop Award.

== Discography ==
- 1986: Party Animal (Scar Face Music)
- 1986: Papa San Meets Anthony Redrose (Weed Beat)
- 1989: Style & Fashion (Pow Wow)
- 1989: System (Pow Wow)
- 1990: Reggae Dance Hall (Rohit)
- 1991: Fire Inna Dancehall (King Dragon)
- 1991: Strange (Pow Wow)
- 1992: Pray for Them (Sonic Sounds)
- 1992: Rough Cut (Pow Wow)
- 1993: In Action (Pow Wow)
- 1993: Pray Fi Dem (RAS)
- 1995: No Place Like Home (VP)
- 1996: Gi Mi Di Loving (Melodie)
- 1999: Victory (Interscope)
- 2003: God & I (Gospo Centric)
- 2005: Real and Personal (Gospocentric)
- 2008: Higher Heights (Beloved Records)
- Unkn: Three the Hard Way (World Enterprise)
- 2012: My Story (Beloved)
- 2014: One Blood
- 2016: Journey (Syntax Creative)
- 2022: Life Lessons (The Orchard Enterprises)

=== Charted singles ===
List of charted singles, showing year released, chart positions and album name
Title	Year	Peak chart position	Album
Title	Year	JAM Air.	Album
"God & I"	2003	1	God & I
