= Marty (rapper) =

American rapper

- Also known as: Marty; Marty Mar
- Born: Martin Lorenzo Santiago; 1987 (age 38–39); Miami, Florida, U.S.
- Genre: Christian hip hop
- Occupation: Rapper
- Instrument: Vocals
- Years active: 2015–present

Martin Lorenzo Santiago (born 1987), who goes by Marty and sometimes Marty Mar, is an American rapper in the Christian hip hop genre. He is part of the duo, Social Club Misfits, with his partner, Fern. His first extended play, Marty for President, was released in 2015. This was his breakthrough release upon the Billboard magazine charts.

== Early life ==
Santiago was born, Martin Lorenzo Santiago, in 1987, and he was raised in Broward County where he and Fernando Miranda established Social Club.

== Music career ==
Marty's solo music recording career started in 2015, with the extended play, Marty for President, that was released on September 11, 2015, by Social Club. The extended play was his breakthrough release upon the Billboard magazine charts, where it placed on five charts, while it peaked at No. 64 on The Billboard 200, No. 1 on Christian Albums, No. 9 on Independent Albums, No. 7 on Rap Albums, and No. 14 on Digital Albums.

== Discography ==
=== Albums ===
Title	Details
Flop Era Vol. 1	Released: June 21, 2024; Label: Apollo; Formats: Digital download, streaming

=== Extended plays ===
Title	Details	Peak chart positions			
Title	Details	US	US Christ	US Indie	US Rap
Marty for President	Released: September 11, 2015; Label: Social Club; Formats: CD, digital download, streaming	64	1	9	7
Marty for President 2	Released: June 12, 2020; Label: Capitol CMG; Formats: CD, digital download, streaming	—	—	—	—
The One	Released: June 20, 2025; Label: Apollo; Formats: Digital download, streaming	—	—	—	—
"—" denotes a recording that did not chart or was not released in that territory.
