= Lecrae discography =

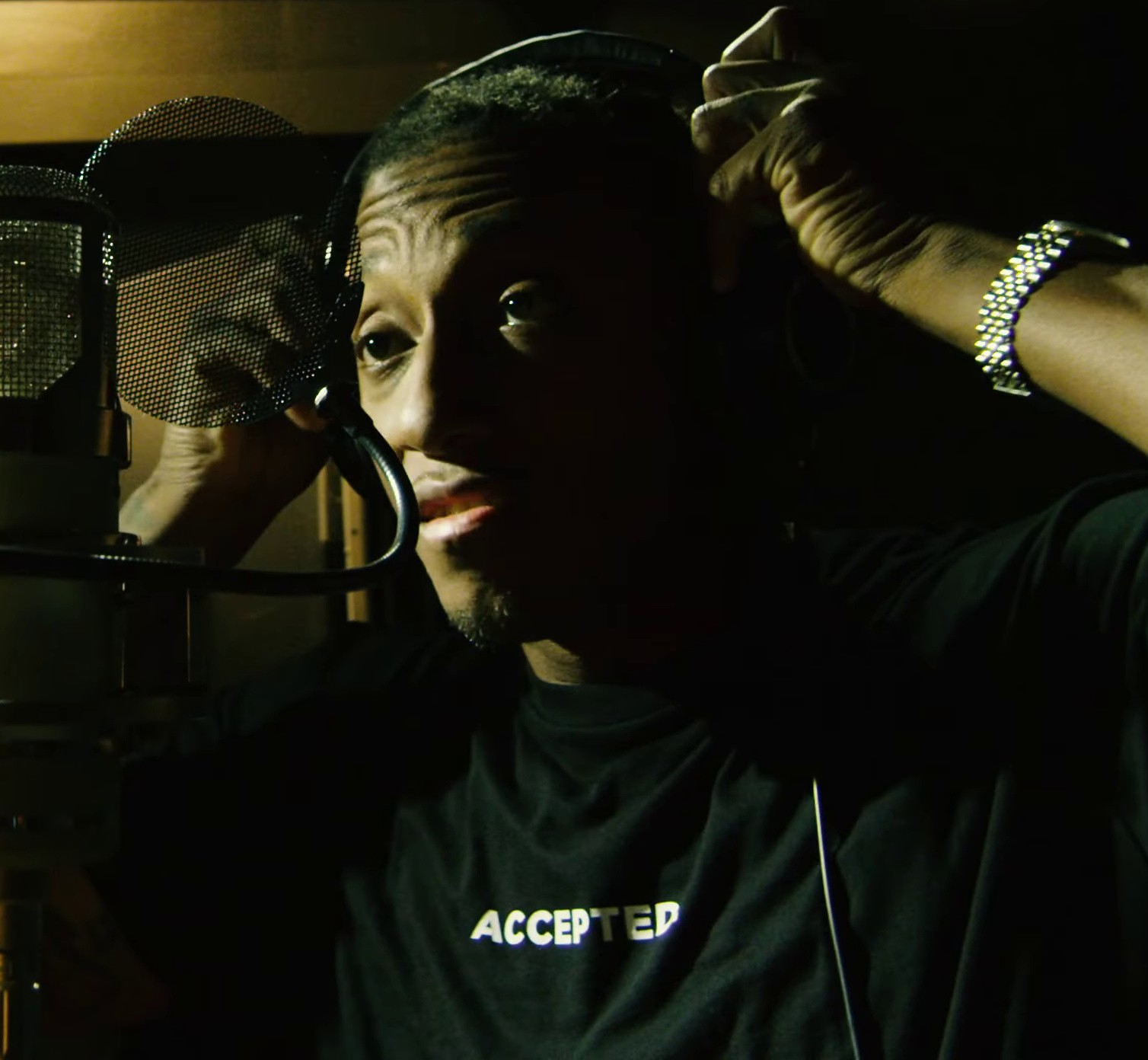
- A video of Lecrae filmed for Spotify, June 2018
- Studio albums: 9
- Extended plays: 1
- Singles: 142
- Music videos: 80
- Mixtapes: 4
- Studio collaborations: 2
- Mixtape collaborations: 1
- EP collaborations: 2
- Other appearances: 87

The discography of Lecrae, an American Christian hip hop artist, consists of 10 studio albums, one which was collaborative; fives mixtapes, one of which was collaborative; three extended plays (two of which were collaborative); 142 singles, including 81 as a featured performer; 80 music videos, including 40 as a featured performer; and 87 guest and other appearances. He debuted with Real Talk in 2004 through Reach Records; the album was re-issued a year later by Cross Movement Records. After the Music Stops followed in 2006 and his third solo album, Rebel, was released in 2008. It reached No. 1 on the Gospel chart, the first Christian hip hop album to do so. Rehab, his fourth solo album, was released in 2010 and reached No. 1 on the Gospel, Christian, and Independent charts, and garnered a nomination at the 53rd Grammy Awards. Rehab: The Overdose, was released on January 11, 2011, and peaked at No. 1 on the Christian and Gospel charts. Lecrae began garnering mainstream attention when he performed at the 2011 BET Hip Hop Awards Cypher (a group free-style) and was featured on the Statik Selektah song "Live and Let Live" from his Population Control album.

On May 10, 2012, Lecrae released his first mixtape, Church Clothes, hosted by DJ Don Cannon. Considered to be his breakthrough into mainstream hip hop, the mixtape was downloaded over 100,000 times in less than 48 hours. The day before its release it was dubbed by the Houston Chronicle and Da South as "the most important album in Christian rap history." On September 4, 2012, Lecrae released his sixth studio album, Gravity, which debuted at No. 3 on the Billboard 200 and No. 1 on the Top Rap, Christian, Gospel, and Independent Albums charts. Gravity was also dubbed the most important album in Christian hip hop history. The album won the Grammy Award for Best Gospel Album at the 55th Grammy Awards. Anomaly was released September 9, 2014, debuting at No. 1 on the Billboard 200. It was certified gold by the Recording Industry Association of America (RIAA) in 2016. On September 22, 2017, he released All Things Work Together, and on June 22, 2018, he released Let the Trap Say Amen, a collaborative album with producer Zaytoven. Both albums reached No. 1 on the Christian chart. He released a tenth studio album, Restoration, on August 21, 2020. It also reached No. 1 on the Christian chart. An eleventh album, a collaboration with 1K Phew entitled No Church in a While, was released on December 3, 2021. Lecrae's fourth mixtape, Church Clothes 4, was released on November 4, 2022. As of February 2020, he has sold over three million albums. Two of Lecrae's singles are certified platinum by the RIAA: "I'll Find You" (featuring Tori Kelly), from All Things Work Together, was certified platinum in 2019, and "Coming In Hot" (with Andy Mineo), from the Summer Eighteen playlist and Mineo's album Neverland II, certified in 2023. Two more of his singles are certified gold by the RIAA: "All I Need Is You", from Anomaly, certified in 2018, and "Blessings" (featuring Ty Dolla Sign), from All Things Work Together, certified in 2019. The song "Church Clap" by KB featuring Lecrae, from the 2012 album Weight & Glory, was also certified Gold in 2023.

== Studio albums ==
"—" denotes a recording that did not chart or was not released in that territory. Beginning in 2015, Billboard rendered most hip hop/rap albums ineligible for the gospel charts.

List of studio albums, with selected chart positions and certifications
Title	Details	Peak chart positions											Certifications
Title	Details	US	US Christ.	US Gospel	US Indie	US R&B/HH (Note: Starting in 2013, Billboard created a sub-chart to the Top Rap/Hip-Hop chart that tracks R&B Albums. From that point on, the R&B/Hip-Hop chart is a combination of the Top Rap Album and Top R&B Album charts.)	BEL (WA)	CAN	NZ	UK R&B/HH	UK Indie	UK C&G	Certifications
Real Talk	Release date: May 20, 2004; Label: Reach	—	—	29	—	—	—	—	—	—	—	—	
After the Music Stops	Release date: September 24, 2006; Label: Reach	— (Note: After the Music Stops did not enter the Billboard 200, but peaked at No. 16 on the Top Heatseekers chart.)	17	5	—	—	—	—	—	—	—	—	
Rebel	Release date: September 30, 2008; Label: Reach	60	2	1	10	—	—	—	—	—	—	—	
Rehab	Release date: September 28, 2010; Label: Reach	17	1	1	1	— (Note: Rehab did not enter the Top R&B/Hip-Hop Albums chart, but peakedat No. 5 on the Top Rap Albums chart.)	—	—	37	—	—	—	
Rehab: The Overdose	Release date: January 11, 2011; Label: Reach	15	1	1	5	— (Note: Rehab: The Overdose did not enter the Top R&B/Hip-Hop Albums chart, but peaked at No. 4 on the Top Rap Albums chart.)	—	—	—	—	—	—	
Gravity	Release date: September 4, 2012; Label: Reach	3	1	1	1	— (Note: Gravity did not enter the Top R&B/Hip-Hop Albums chart, but peaked at No. 1 on the Top Rap Albums chart.)	—	24	16	—	— (Note: Gravity did not enter the OCC UK Independent Albums, but peaked at No. 12 on the OCC UK Independent Breakers.)	—	RIAA: Gold
Anomaly	Release date: September 9, 2014; Label: Reach	1	1	1	1	— (Note: Anomaly did not enter the Top R&B/Hip-Hop Albums chart, but peaked at No. 1 on the Top Rap Albums chart.)	—	16	34	19	37	1	RIAA: Gold
All Things Work Together	Release date: September 22, 2017; Label: Reach, Columbia	11	1	—	—	8	160	69	—	34	—	—	
Let the Trap Say Amen (with Zaytoven)	Release date: June 22, 2018; Label: Reach	49	1	—	3	26	—	—	— (Note: Let the Trap Say Amen did not enter the Recorded Music NZ New Zealand Albums Chart, but peaked at No. 10 on the NZ Heatseekers Chart.)	—	—	—	
Restoration	Release date: August 21, 2020; Label: Reach	69	1	—	13	39	—	—	—	—	—	5	
No Church in a While (with 1K Phew)	Release date: December 3, 2021; Label: Reach	—	15	—	—	—	—	—	—	—	—	—	
Reconstruction	Release date: August 22, 2025; Label: Reach	—	6	—	—	—	—	—	—	—	—	—	

== EPs ==
List of extended plays, with selected chart positions
Title	Details	Peak chart positions		
Title	Details	US Christ	US Gospel	US Rap
Church Clothes	Release date: May 10, 2012; Label: Reach Records	10	10	75
Coming in Hot (Remix Pack) (with Andy Mineo)	Release date: May 21, 2021; Label: Reach	—	—	—

== Mixtapes ==
"—" denotes a recording that did not chart or was not released in that territory. Beginning in 2015, Billboard rendered most hip hop/rap albums ineligible for the gospel charts.

Mixtapes, with selected chart positions
Title	Details	Peak chart positions							
Title	Details	US	US Christ	US Gospel	US Indie	US Rap	CAN	UK Indie	UK C&G
Church Clothes	Release date: May 10, 2012; Label: Reach, Datpiff.com	—	—	—	—	—	—	—	—
Church Clothes 2	Release Date: November 7, 2013; Label: Reach, Datpiff	21	1	1	2	3	—	—	15
Church Clothes 3	Release date: January 15, 2016; Label: Reach	12	1	—	1	1	57	— (Note: Church Clothes 3 did not enter the OCC UK Independent Albums, but peaked at No. 14 on the OCC UK Independent Breakers)	19
Church Clothes 4	Release date: November 4, 2022; Label: Reach	—	2	—	—	—	—	—	—
Get Well Soon (with Miles Minnick)	Release date: May 16, 2025; Label: Reach	—	—	—	—	—	—	—	—

== Singles ==
=== As lead artist ===
"—" denotes a recording that did not chart or was not released in that territory. Beginning in 2015, Billboard rendered most hip hop/rap songs ineligible for the gospel charts.

List of singles as lead artist, with selected chart positions and certifications
Title	Year	Peak chart positions							Certifications	Album
Title	Year	US Bubb	US Christ	US Gospel	US Heat	US R&B/HH Air	US Rap Digital	US RHY	Certifications	Album
"Jesus Muzik" (featuring Trip Lee)	2006	—	—	—	—	—	—	—		After the Music Stops
"Prayin' for You"	2006	—	—	—	—	—	—	—		After the Music Stops
"Beyond Belief"	2007	—	—	—	—	—	—	—		Non-album singles
"Catch the Wave"	2008	—	—	—	—	—	—	—		Non-album singles
"Go Hard" (featuring Tedashii)	2008	—	—	— (Note: "Go Hard" did not enter the Hot Gospel Songs chart, but peaked at No. 8 on the Gospel Digital Songs chart.)	—	—	—	—		Rebel
"Hands High"	2008	—	—	—	—	—	—	—		Non-album singles
"1 Life Dream"	2009	—	—	—	—	—	—	—		Non-album singles
"Far Away"	2010	—	— (Note: "Far Away" did not enter the Hot Christian Songs chart, but peaked at No. 8 on the Christian Digital Songs chart.)	— (Note: "Far Away" did not enter the Hot Gospel Songs chart, but peaked at No. 1 on the Gospel Digital Songs chart.)	—	—	—	—		charity single
"Amp It Up" (featuring Tedashii)	2010	—	—	—	—	—	—	—		Non-album single
"High" (featuring Sho Baraka & Suzy Rock)	2010	—	—	— (Note: "High" did not enter the Hot Gospel Songs chart, but peaked at No. 10 on the Gospel Digital Songs chart.)	—	—	—	—		Rehab
"Just Like You" (featuring J. Paul)	2010	—	—	—	—	—	—	—		Rehab
"Children of the Light" (featuring Sonny Sandoval & Dillavou)	2010	—	—	— (Note: "Children of the Light" did not enter the Hot Gospel Songs chart, but peaked at No. 20 on the Gospel Digital Songs chart.)	—	—	—	—		Rehab
"Overdose"	2010	—	—	— (Note: "Overdose" did not enter the Hot Gospel Songs chart, but peaked at No. 2 on the Gospel Digital Songs chart.)	—	—	—	—		Rehab: The Overdose
"Battle Song" (featuring Suzy Rock)	2011	—	—	—	—	—	—	—		Rehab: The Overdose
"Game On" (featuring PRo, Tedashii & Jai)	2011	—	—	—	—	—	—	—		Non-album single
"Hallelujah"	2011	—	— (Note: "Hallelujah" did not enter the Hot Christian Songs chart, but peaked at No. 2 on the Christian Digital Songs chart.)	— (Note: "Hallelujah" did not enter the Hot Gospel Songs chart, but peaked at No. 1 on the Gospel Digital Songs chart.)	—	—	—	—		Rehab
"Blow Your High" (featuring Canon)	2011	—	—	—	—	—	—	—		Rehab: The Overdose
"Church Clothes"	2012	—	—	—	—	—	—	—		Church Clothes
"I Know"	2012	—	—	— (Note: "I Know" did not enter the Hot Gospel Songs chart, but peaked at No. 1 on the Gospel Digital Songs chart.)	—	—	—	—		Gravity
"Tell the World" (featuring Mali Music)	2012	—	—	— (Note: "Tell the World" did not enter the Hot Gospel Songs chart, but peaked at No. 17 on the Gospel Digital Songs chart.)	—	—	—	—		Gravity
"Round of Applause"	2013	—	45	17	—	—	—	—		Church Clothes 2
"I'm Rooted" (featuring Derek Minor)	2013	—	—	—	—	—	—	—		Non-album single
"I'm Turnt"	2013	—	19	— (Note: "I'm Turnt]" did not enter the Hot Gospel Songs chart, but peaked at No 2. on the Gospel Digital Songs chart.)	—	—	—	—		Church Clothes 2
"Fear"	2014	—	4	2	—	—	15	—		Anomaly
"Nuthin"	2014	—	2	1	—	—	11	—		Anomaly
"All I Need Is You"	2014	23	2	1	—	—	9	—	RIAA: Gold	Anomaly
"Say I Won't" (featuring Andy Mineo)	2014	7	2	1	18	— (Note: Charted at No. 25 on the Hot Rap Songs chart)	7	—		Anomaly
"Non-Fiction"	2014	—	43	—	—	—	—	—		Non-album single
"Can't Stop Me Now (Destination)"	2016	—	34	—	—	—	—	—		All Things Work Together
"Blessings" (featuring Ty Dolla $ign)	2017	25	2	—	—	18	17	34	RIAA: Gold	All Things Work Together
"River of Jordan" (featuring Breyan Isaac)	2017	—	25	—	—	—	—	—		The Shack Soundtrack
"I'll Find You" (featuring Tori Kelly)	2017	15	1	—	—	— (Note: Charted at No. 2 on the Bubbling Under R&B/Hip-Hop Songs chart and No. 11 on the R&B/Hip-Hop Digital Songs chart)	8	7	RIAA: Platinum; RMNZ: Gold	All Things Work Together
"Broke"	2017	—	17	—	—	—	—	—		All Things Work Together
"Get Back Right" (with Zaytoven)	2018	—	18	—	—	—	—	—		Let the Trap Say Amen
"Plugged In" (with Zaytoven)	2018	—	26	—	—	—	—	—		Let the Trap Say Amen
"Coming In Hot" (with Andy Mineo)	2018	—	21	—	—	—	—	—	RIAA: Platinum	Summer Eighteen and Neverland II
"Set Me Free" (featuring YK Osiris)	2020	—	15	—	—	— (Note: Charted at No. 16 on the R&B/Hip-Hop Digital Songs chart)	10	—		Restoration
"Deep End"	2020	—	25	—	—	—	—	—		Restoration
"Drown" (featuring John Legend)	2020	—	—	—	—	— (Note: Also charted at No. 10 on the R&B/Hip-Hop Digital Songs chart)	8	—		Restoration
"Zombie"	2020	—	31	—	—	—	—	—		Restoration
"This is My Time"	2020	—	—	—	—	—	—	—		Spider-Man: Miles Morales Original Video Game Soundtrack
"Where We Come From"	2020	—	—	—	—	—	—	—		Spider-Man: Miles Morales Original Video Game Soundtrack
"Coming in Hot (Wuki Remix)" (Lecrae and Andy Mineo featuring Wuki)	2021	—	—	—	—	—	—	—		Coming in Hot (Remix Pack)
"Holupwait"	2021	—	—	—	—	—	—	—		Summer Twenty-One
"Everyday" (featuring Jidenna and Limoblaze)	2021	—	—	—	—	—	—	—		Summer Twenty-One
"Wildin" (Lecrae and 1K Phew)	2021	—	—	—	—	—	—	—		No Church in a While
"Any Attack" (Lecrae and 1K Phew)	2022	—	—	—	—	—	—	—		Summer Twenty-Two
"Spread the Opps"	2022	—	28	—	—	—	—	—		Church Clothes 4
"Fear Not"	2022	—	45	—	—	—	—	—		Church Clothes 4
"Walk" (Hulvey and Lecrae)	2023	—	31	—	—	—	—	—		Non-album single
"Your Power" (Lecrae and Tasha Cobbs Leonard)	2023	—	—	8	—	—	—	—		The Forge: Official Soundtrack
"Extra"	2023	—	—	—	—	—	—	—		Summer 23
"Add It Up" (featuring Scootie Wop)	2023	—	—	—	—	—	—	—		Summer 23
"I Still Believe" (featuring For King & Country)	2024	—	26	—	—	—	—	—		Non-album single
"Still Here"	2024	—	25	—	—	—	—	—		Reconstruction
"Die for the Party"	2024	—	34	—	—	—	—	—		Reconstruction
"Lift Me Up"(Lecrae and Beam)	2024	—	49	—	—	—	—	—		Non-album singles
"Seu Poder" (featuring Lukas Agustinho)	2025	—	—	—	—	—	—	—		Non-album singles
"On Time"(with Miles Minnick)	2025	—	—	—	—	—	—	—		Get Well Soon
"Heaven Sent" (with Miles Minnick)	2025	—	—	—	—	—	—	—		Get Well Soon
"Day One" (with Childlike CiCi)	2025	—	—	—	—	—	—	—		All We Like Sheep
"Alright" (with Trae the Truth and Baby Truth)	2025	—	—	—	—	—	—	—		Non-album single
"Tell No Lie" (with Jackie Hill Perry)	2025	—	—	—	—	—	—	—		Reconstruction
"Bless You" (with Torey D'Shaun)	2025	—	—	—	—	—	—	—		Reconstruction
"My Everything"	2026	—	—	—	—	—	—	—		Reconstruction: Second Story

=== As featured artist ===
"—" denotes a recording that did not chart or was not released in that territory. Beginning in 2015, Billboard rendered most hip hop/rap songs ineligible for the gospel charts.

List of singles as featured artist, with selected chart positions
Title	Year	Peak chart positions						Certifications	Album
Title	Year	US Adult R&B	US Christ	US Dance	US Gospel	Rap Digital	US Afrobeat	Certifications	Album
"Joyful Noise" (Flame featuring Lecrae and John Reilly)	2008	—	—	—	1 (Note: Also charted at No. 9 on the Gospel Digital Song Sales chart)	—	—		Our World: Redeemed
"Show Off" (DJ Official featuring Lecrae and Flame)	2009	—	—	—	—	—	—		Entermission
"26's" (Tedashii featuring Lecrae)	2009	—	—	—	—	—	—		Identity Crisis
"Keep Changing the World [Single Mix]" (Mikeschair featuring Lecrae)	2010	—	21 (Note: Also charted at No. 19 on the Christian AC chart and No. 22 on the Christian Airplay chart)	—	—	—	—		Non-album single
"Bury Me" (Tedashii featuring Lecrae)	2010	—	—	—	—	—	—		Non-album single
"Actions Speak Louder" (Swoope featuring Lecrae, Tedashii and Jai)	2010	—	—	—	—	—	—		charity single
"All the Way" (Flame featuring Trubble and Lecrae)	2010	—	—	—	—	—	—		Non-album single
"Show Off (Guitar Remix)" (DJ Official featuring Lecrae, Flame, and KJ-52)	2011	—	—	—	—	—	—		I Didn't Invent the Remix
"All About God" (Dillon Chase featuring Lecrae and Princeton)	2011	—	—	—	—	—	—		Weak
"Live & Let Live" (Statik Selektah featuring Lecrae)	2011	—	—	—	— (Note: Charted at No. 1 on the Gospel Digital Song Sales chart)	—	—		Population Control
"He's A A A Able" (The Nevels Sisters featuring Lecrae and PK)	2011	—	—	—	—	—	—		It's My Time (New Traditional Thump)
"I Will Find You" (Jimmy Needham featuring Lecrae)	2012	—	—	—	—	—	—		Clear the Stage
"Work" (Dee-1 featuring Lecrae)	2012	—	—	—	—	—	—		The Focus Tape
"I'm Good" (Trip Lee featuring Lecrae)	2012	—	—	—	— (Note: Charted at No. 1 on the Gospel Digital Song Sales chart)	—	—		The Good Life
"They Like Me" (KJ-52 featuring Lecrae)	2012	—	—	—	—	—	—		Dangerous
"Rise Up" (Andy Mineo featuring Lecrae)	2012	—	—	—	—	—	—		Non-album single
"Cray Button" (Family Force 5 featuring Lecrae)	2012	—	—	—	—	—	—		III.V
"Best Thing That I Found" (Saigon featuring Lecrae and Corbett)	2012	—	—	—	—	—	—		The Greatest Story Never Told Chapter 2: Bread and Circuses
"I Know" (DJ Official Remix) (DJ Official featuring Lecrae)	2012	—	—	—	—	—	—		Gravity: The Remix EP
"Violence" (Gangnam Style Remix) (Alex Medina featuring Lecrae)	2012	—	—	—	—	—	—		Gravity: The Remix EP
"Ready for the World" (Ruslan featuring Lecrae and Chris Cobbins)	2013	—	—	—	—	—	—		Carry On
"It's Not Over" (Chaka Khan featuring Lecrae)	2013	—	—	7	—	—	—		Non-album single
"Game Break" (Statik Selektah featuring Lecrae, Termanology, and Posdnuos)	2013	—	—	—	—	—	—		Extended Play
"Dear Mr. Christian" (Derek Minor featuring Dee-1 and Lecrae)	2013	—	—	—	—	—	—		Minorville
"So Glad" (Isaac Carree featuring Lecrae, Kirk Franklin, and Kierra Sheard)	2013	—	—	—	—	—	—		Reset
"It's Not Over [The Remixes]" (Chaka Khan featuring Lecrae)	2013	—	—	—	—	—	—		iKhan Project
"Radio" (Papa San featuring Lecrae)	2014	—	—	—	—	—	—		One Blood
"Help" (Erica Campbell featuring Lecrae)	2014	22	—	—	— (Note: Charted at No. 4 on the Gospel Airplay chart)	—	—		Help
"You Know (Remix)" (Bizzle featuring Lecrae)	2014	—	—	—	—	—	—		Well Wishes
"Heartbeat" (Da' T.R.U.T.H. featuring Lecrae and Lauren Lee)	2014	—	—	—	—	—	—		Heartbeat
"Daywalkers" (Propaganda featuring Lecrae)	2014	—	—	—	—	—	—		Crimson Cord
"Manolo" (Trip Lee featuring Lecrae)	2014	—	—	—	3 (Note: Also charted at No. 1 on the Gospel Digital Song Sales chart)	31	—		Rise
"High" (The Walls Group featuring Lecrae)	2014	—	—	—	—	—	—		Fast Forward
"This Is Living" (Hillsong Young & Free featuring Lecrae)	2015	—	— (Note: Charted at No. 29 on the Christian Airplay chart)	—	—	—	—		This Is Living EP
"Sideways" (KB featuring Lecrae)	2015	—	—	—	—	—	—		Tomorrow We Live
"Get Up" (Blanca featuring Lecrae)	2015	—	—	—	—	—	—		Blanca
"What You Get" (BrvndonP featuring Lecrae and JustKristofer)	2016	—	—	—	—	—	—		BrvndonP
"Poor Man's Hood" (Young Doe featuring Lecrae)	2016	—	—	—	—	—	—		Street Hustler 2
"theBottom" (theBeatbreaker featuring Lecrae and Derek Minor)	2016	—	—	—	—	—	—		Heard Not Seen II
"I Heard the Truth" (Bryson Price featuring Lecrae)	2016	—	—	—	—	—	—		non-album single
"Don't Give Up" (Lalah Hathaway featuring Lecrae)	2017	—	—	—	—	—	—		Honestly
Look Up" (Kevin Ross featuring Lecrae)	2017	—	—	—	—	—	—		The Awakening
"Woke" (Reconcile featuring Lecrae)	2017	—	—	—	—	—	—		Street Don't Love You
"Religion (Remix)" (PJ Morton featuring Lecrae)	2017	—	—	—	—	—	—		Non-album single
"Blessings" (Rexx Life Raj featuring Lecrae and Mozzy)	2018	—	—	—	—	—	—		Non-album single
"Fight for Me" (Gawvi featuring Lecrae)	2018	—	— (Note: Charted at No. 35 on the Christian Airplay chart)	—	—	—	—		Summer Eighteen and Panorama
"When I'm Around You" (Montell Jordan featuring Lecrae)	2019	18	—	—	—	—	—		Masterpeace
"Come Together" (Rodney Jerkins featuring Tim Bowman, Jr., Joy Enriquez, Kirk Franklin, Kelontae Gavin, Fred Hammond, Heavenly Joy, Le’Andria Johnson, Lecrae, Mary Mary, Jac Ross, Marvin Sapp, Karen Clark Sheard, Kierra Sheard, and Shelby 5)	2020	—	—	—	—	—	—		charity single
"Glorify" (Jordan Feliz featuring Lecrae and Hulvey)	2020	—	—	—	—	—	—		Say It
"Made a Way [Remix]" (Bobby Sessions featuring Lecrae)	2021	—	—	—	—	—	—		Non-album single
"Amen (Reborn)" (For King & Country featuring Lecrae and The World Famous Tony Williams)	2021	—	—	—	—	—	—		Burn the Ships (Deluxe Edition: Remixes & Collaborations)
"Reasons" (Hulvey featuring Lecrae and Svrcina)	2021	—	—	—	—	—	—		Christopher
"Blessed Up (Remix)" (Wande featuring Lecrae and Mike Todd)	2021	—	—	—	—	—	—		Non-album single
"Paid for It (Remix)" (Ty Brasel featuring Lecrae and Melodie Wagner)	2021	—	—	—	—	—	—		Non-album single
"Been About It" (Andy Mineo featuring Lecrae)	2021	—	43	—	—	—	—		Neverland II
"Can't Tell It All [Remix]" (Hulvey featuring KB and Lecrae)	2021	—	—	—	—	—	—	RIAA: Gold	Non-album single
"Boom" (Shelby 5 featuring Lecrae)	2022	—	—	—	—	—	—		Non-album single
"Respect My Team" (Tedashii featuring Trip Lee and Lecrae)	2022	—	—	—	—	—	—		This Time Around 2
"Jireh (My Provider) (Remix)" (Limoblaze featuring Lecrae and Happi)	2022	—	41	—	11 (Note: Also charted at No. 6 on the Gospel Digital Song Sales chart)	—	31		Sunday in Lagos
"I Think" (Good aka Carmela Mose featuring Lecrae)	2022	—	—	—	—	—	—		non-album single (Securus song contest winner)
"Holy (Drill)" Bigpapamadethis featuring Michael W Smith, Don Moen, and Lecrae)	2022	—	—	—	—	—	—		Non-album single
"I Give You My Heart (Drill)" (Bigpapamadethis featuring Darlene Zschech, Hillsong, Lecrae, Don Moen, and Redfourth)	2022	—	—	—	—	—	—		Non-album single
"Big!" (Miles Minnick featuring Lecrae)	2023	—	—	—	—	—	—		Non-album single
"Miracles" (KB featuring Lecrae)	2023	—	—	—	15	—	—		His Glory Alone II
"Danzando (Nadie Como Tú) [Remix]" (Gateway Worship Español featuring Lecrae)	2023	—	—	—	—	—	—		Non-album single
"Joy Comes in the Morning (Remix)" (Tauren Wells featuring DOE and Lecrae)	2023	—	—	—	—	—	—		Non-album single
"Texas Pete" (Tedashii and Trip Lee featuring Lecrae)	2023	—	—	—	—	—	—		Summer 23
"Back Home" (DKG KIE featuring Lecrae)	2023	—	—	—	—	—	—		Summer 23
"Nothing but the Blood" (Forrest Frank featuring Lecrae)	2023	—	47	—	—	—	—		New Hymns
"No Weapon (Remix)" (Scootie Wop featuring Lecrae & Fred Hammond)	2023	—	—	—	—	—	—		Non-album single
"Going My Way" (O'Bros featuring Lecrae)	2023	—	—	—	—	—	—		Underrated
"Judas" (YeloHill featuring Lecrae)	2024	—	—	—	—	—	—		Four-track non-album single
"Cant Stop" (Jaysta featuring Lecrae)	2024	—	—	—	—	—	—		Non-album single
"To Hell with the Devil (Rise)" (For King & Country featuring Lecrae & Stryper)	2024	—	—	—	—	—	—		Unsung Hero: The Inspired By Soundtrack
"God Made a Way (Remix) (WhatUPRG featuring Lecrae and nobigdyl)	2024	—	—	—	—	—	—		
"Send That" (Wande featuring Lecrae)	2024	—	—	—	—	—	—		Non-album single
"So What" (Doe featuring Lecrae)	2024	—	—	—	24	—	—		Heart of a Human
"Give Me My Heart Back" (Masked Wolf featuring Lecrae)	2024	—	—	—	—	—	—		The Devil Wears Prada but God Wears Gucci
"Ready Now" (Jeremy Camp featuring Lecrae)	2024	—	—	—	—	—	—		Non-album single
"Lean" (Still Shadey featuring Lecrae)	2024	—	—	—	—	—	—		Non-album single
"Lecrae" (Yng D-Fly featuring Lecrae)	2025	—	—	—	—	—	—		Non-album single
"Sunday" (Ace Clark featuring Lecrae)	2025	—	—	—	—	—	—		Non-album single
"Go! Go! Go!" (Forrest Frank featuring KB and Lecrae)	2026	—	29	—	—	—	—		The Jesus Generation

== Promotional singles ==
List of promotional singles
Title	Year	Peak chart positions	Album
Title	Year	US Christ	Album
"LIFE"	2025	—	Reconstruction
"Headphones" (with Killer Mike and T.I.)	2025	31	Reconstruction
"There For You" (with Fridayy)	2025	—	Reconstruction
"Erase Me" (with Hollyn)	2025	—	Reconstruction
"—" denotes releases that did not chart

== Other charted and certified songs ==
List of other songs, with selected chart positions
Title	Year	Peak chart positions							Certifications	Album
Title	Year	US Bubb	US Christ	US Digital	Classical Digital	US Gospel	US Heat	US R&B/ HH Digital	Certifications	Album
"Don't Waste Your Life" (featuring Cameron Dukes and Dwayne Tryumf)	2008	—	—	—	—	— (Note: Charted at No. 5 on the Gospel Digital Songs chart)	—	—		Rebel
"Background" (featuring C-Lite)	2010	—	39 (Note: Also charted at No. 39 on the Christian Airplay chart and No. 25 on the Christian Digital Songs chart)	—	—	— (Note: Charted at No. 2 on the Gospel Digital Songs chart)	—	—		Rebel
"Dum Dum" (Tedashii featuring Lecrae)	2011	—	— (Note: Charted at No. 7 on the Christian Digital Songs chart)	—	—	— (Note: Charted at No. 2 on the Gospel Digital Songs chart)	—	—		Blacklight
"Shadows" (David Crowder Band featuring Lecrae)	2011	—	— (Note: Charted at No. 18 on the Christian Digital Songs chart)	—	—	—	—	—		Passion: Here for You
"40 Deep" (featuring Trip Lee and Tedashii)	2010	—	—	—	—	— (Note: Charted at No. 7 on the Gospel Digital Songs chart)	—	—		Rehab
"Check In"	2010	11	—	—	—	—	—	—		Rehab
"Boasting" (featuring Anthony Evans)	2010	—	—	—	—	— (Note: Charted at No. 16 on the Gospel Digital Songs chart)	—	—		Rehab
"Divine Intervention" (featuring J.R.)	2010	—	— (Note: Charted at No. 23 on the Christian Digital Songs chart)	—	—	— (Note: Charted at No. 2 on the Gospel Digital Songs chart)	—	—		Rehab
"God is Enough" (featuring Flame and Jai)	2010	—	—	—	—	— (Note: Charted at No. 7 on the Gospel Digital Songs chart)	—	—		Rehab
"I Love You" (featuring Chris Lee)	2010	—	—	—	—	— (Note: Charted at No. 18 on the Gospel Digital Songs chart)	—	—		Rehab
"Killa"	2010	—	— (Note: Charted at No. 24 on the Christian Digital Songs chart)	—	—	— (Note: Charted at No. 3 on the Gospel Digital Songs chart)	—	—		Rehab
"Walking on Water"	2010	—	—	—	—	— (Note: Charted at No. 17 on the Gospel Digital Songs chart)	—	—		Rehab
"Jesus Muzik (Dubstep Remix)"	2011	—	—	—	—	— (Note: Charted at No. 16 on the Gospel Digital Songs chart)	—	—		Rehab
"Anger Management" (featuring Thi'sl)	2011	—	—	—	—	— (Note: Charted at No. 8 on the Gospel Digital Songs chart)	—	—		Rehab: The Overdose
"Going In" (featuring Swoope)	2011	—	—	—	—	— (Note: Charted at No. 15 on the Gospel Digital Songs chart)	—	—		Rehab: The Overdose
"More"	2011	—	—	—	—	— (Note: Charted at No. 10 on the Gospel Digital Songs chart)	—	—		Rehab: The Overdose
"Overdose"	2011	—	—	—	—	— (Note: Charted at No. 2 on the Gospel Digital Songs chart)	—	—		Rehab: The Overdose
"Strung Out"	2011	—	—	—	—	— (Note: Charted at No. 13 on the Gospel Digital Songs chart)	—	—		Rehab: The Overdose
"Chase That (Ambition)"	2011	—	—	—	—	—	—	— (Note: Charted at No. 47 on the Rap Digital Songs chart)		Rehab: The Overdose
"Going In" (PRo featuring Lecrae and Tedashii)	2011	—	— (Note: Charted at No. 49 on the Christian Digital Songs chart)	—	—	—	—	—		Dying to Live
"Show Out" (Flame featuring Lecrae)	2012	—	—	—	—	— (Note: Charted at No. 5 on the Gospel Digital Songs chart)	—	—		The 6th
"Church Clap" (KB featuring Lecrae)	2012	—	—	—	—	— (Note: Charted at No. 10 on the Gospel Digital Songs chart)	—	—	RIAA: Gold	Weight & Glory
"Forgiveness" (TobyMac featuring Lecrae)	2012	24	— (Note: Charted at No. 1 on the Christian Digital Songs chart)	—	—	—	—	—		Eye On It
"Ready or Not" (Britt Nicole featuring Lecrae)	2012	—	33 (Note: Also charted at No. 28 on the Christian AC chart and No. 27 on the Christian Airplay chart)	—	—	—	—	—		Gold
"Fakin'" (featuring Thi'sl)	2012	—	—	—	—	— (Note: Charted at No. 17 on the Gospel Digital Songs chart)	—	—		Gravity
"Falling Down" (featuring Swoope and Trip Lee)	2012	—	—	—	—	— (Note: Charted at No. 21 on the Gospel Digital Songs chart)	—	—		Gravity
"Free from it All" (featuring Mathai)	2012	—	—	—	—	— (Note: Charted at No. 15 on the Gospel Digital Songs chart)	—	—		Gravity
"Gravity" (featuring J.R.)	2012	—	— (Note: Charted at No. 27 on the Christian Digital Songs chart)	—	—	— (Note: Charted at No. 6 on the Gospel Digital Songs chart)	—	—		Gravity
"Lord Have Mercy" (featuring Tedashii)	2012	—	— (Note: Charted at No. 41 on the Christian Digital Songs chart)	—	—	— (Note: Charted at No. 11 on the Gospel Digital Songs chart)	—	—		Gravity
"Power Trip" (featuring PRo, Sho Baraka, and Andy Mineo)	2012	—	—	—	—	— (Note: Charted at No. 16 on the Gospel Digital Songs chart)	—	—		Gravity
"The Drop (Intro)"	2012	—	— (Note: Charted at No. 38 on the Christian Digital Songs chart)	—	—	— (Note: Charted at No. 10 on the Gospel Digital Songs chart)	—	—		Gravity
"Violence"	2012	—	—	—	—	— (Note: Charted at No. 14 on the Gospel Digital Songs chart)	—	—		Gravity
"Walk with Me" (featuring Novel)	2012	—	—	—	—	— (Note: Charted at No. 22 on the Gospel Digital Songs chart)	—	—		Gravity
"Fuego" (featuring KB and Suzy Rock)	2012	11	—	64	—	—	20	13 (Note: Also charted at No. 10 on the Rap Digital Songs chart)		Gravity
"Higher" (featuring Tenth Avenue North)	2012	—	— (Note: Charted at No. 4 on the Christian Digital Songs chart)	—	—	— (Note: Charted at No. 2 on the Gospel Digital Songs chart)	—	—		Gravity
"Awake My Soul" (Chris Tomlin featuring Lecrae)	2013	—	— (Note: Charted at No. 7 on the Christian Digital Songs chart)	—	—	—	—	—		Burning Lights
"Uno Uno Seis" (Andy Mineo featuring Lecrae)	2013	—	43	—	—	—	—	—		Heroes for Sale
"The Fever" (featuring Andy Mineo and Papa San)	2013	—	47	—	—	—	—	—		Church Clothes, Vol. 2
"If I Die Tonight" (featuring Novel)	2013	—	48	—	—	20	—	—		Church Clothes, Vol. 2
"Let It Whip" (featuring Paul Wall)	2013	—	—	—	—	22	—	—		Church Clothes, Vol. 2
"Nothing I Can't Do" (Tedashii featuring Trip Lee and Lecrae)	2014	—	—	—	—	11 (Note: Charted at No. 12 on the Gospel Digital Songs chart)	—	—		Below Paradise
"Outsiders"	2014	—	21	—	—	10	—	—		Anomaly
"Welcome to America"	2014	—	24	—	—	11	—	—		Anomaly
"Good, Bad, Ugly"	2014	—	35	—	—	18	—	—		Anomaly
"Timepiece"	2014	—	27	—	—	14	—	—		Anomaly
"Runners"	2014	—	40	—	—	22	—	—		Anomaly
"Wish"	2014	—	41	—	—	23	—	—		Anomaly
"Messengers" (featuring For King & Country)	2014	—	20 (Note: Also charted at No. 23 on the Christian AC chart and No. 22 on the Christian Airplay chart)	—	—	7	—	—		Anomaly
"Anomaly"	2014	—	38	—	—	20	—	—		Anomaly
"Give In" (featuring Crystal Nicole)	2014	—	27 (Note: Also charted at No. 26 on the Christian Airplay chart)	—	—	18	—	—		Anomaly
"Broken" (featuring Kari Jobe)	2014	—	29	—	—	14	—	—		Anomaly
"Dirty Water"	2014	—	33	—	—	17	—	—		Anomaly
"Don't Let This Feeling Fade" (Lindsey Stirling featuring Rivers Cuomo and Lecrae)	2016	—	—	—	16	—	—	—		Brave Enough
"Can't Do You" (featuring E-40)	2016	—	18	—	—	—	—	—		Church Clothes 3
"Sidelines"	2016	—	20	—	—	—	—	—		Church Clothes 3
"I Wouldn't Know" (featuring KB)	2016	—	22	—	—	—	—	—		Church Clothes 3
"Gangland" (featuring Propaganda)	2016	—	29	—	—	—	—	—		Church Clothes 3
"Cruising"	2016	—	31	—	—	—	—	—		Church Clothes 3
"Freedom" (featuring N'dambi)	2016	—	32	—	—	—	—	—		Church Clothes 3
"It Is What It Is"	2016	—	35	—	—	—	—	—		Church Clothes 3
"Deja Vu"	2016	—	36	—	—	—	—	—		Church Clothes 3
"Misconceptions 3" (featuring John Givez, JGivens, and Jackie Hill Perry)	2016	—	39	—	—	—	—	—		Church Clothes 3
"Forever"	2016	—	43	—	—	—	—	—		Church Clothes 3
"Whatchu Mean" (featuring Aha Gazelle)	2017	—	18	—	—	— (Note: Charted at No. 25 on the Gospel Digital Songs chart)	—	—		All Things Work Together
"Facts"	2017	—	31	—	—	—	—	—		All Things Work Together
"Hammer Time" (featuring 1K Phew)	2017	—	14 (Note: Also charted at No. 2 on the Christian Digital Songs chart)	—	—	—	—	—		All Things Work Together
"8:28" (featuring Lewis Sky)	2017	—	37	—	—	—	—	—		All Things Work Together
"Always Knew"	2017	—	38	—	—	—	—	—		All Things Work Together
"Lucked Up" (featuring Nija)	2017	—	42	—	—	—	—	—		All Things Work Together
"Worth It" (featuring Kierra Sheard and Jawan Harris)	2017	—	43	—		—	—	—		All Things Work Together
"Wish You the Best" (featuring Verse Simmonds)	2017	—	46	—		—	—	—		All Things Work Together
"Cry for You" (featuring Taylor Hill)	2017	—	33	—	—	—	—	—		All Things Work Together
"Come and Get Me"	2017	—	39	—	—	—	—	—		All Things Work Together
"2 Sides of the Game" (with Zaytoven featuring K-So & Waka Flocka Flame)	2018	—	24	—	—	—	—	—		Let the Trap Say Amen
"Holy Water" (with Zaytoven)	2018	—	42	—	—	—	—	—		Let the Trap Say Amen
"Only God Can Judge Me" (with Zaytoven)	2018	—	44	—	—	—	—	—		Let the Trap Say Amen
"Blue Strips" (with Zaytoven)	2018	—	47	—	—	—	—	—		Let the Trap Say Amen
"Preach" (with Zaytoven)	2018	—	40	—	—	—	—	—		Let the Trap Say Amen
"I Can't Lose" (with Zaytoven featuring 24hrs.)	2018	—	46	—	—	—	—	—		Let the Trap Say Amen
"Masterpiece" (Tori Kelly featuring Lecrae)	2018	—	—	—	—	13 (Note: Also charted at No. 5 on the Gospel Digital Songs chart)	—	—		Hiding Place
"Get Out My Way" (Tedashii featuring Lecrae)	2019	—	42	—	—	—	—	—		Never Fold
"Sunday Morning" (featuring Kirk Franklin)	2020	—	—	—	—	21 (Note: Also charted at No. 8 on the Gospel Digital Songs chart)	—	—		Restoration
"Wheels Up" (featuring Marc E. Bassy)	2020	—	27	—	—	—	—	—		Restoration
"Over the Top"	2020	—	29	—	—	—	—	—		Restoration
"Nothing Left to Hide" (featuring Gwen Bunn)	2020	—	37	—	—	—	—	—		Restoration
"Restore Me"	2020	—	34	—	—	—	—	—		Restoration
Still in America"	2022	—	27	—	—	—	—	—		Church Clothes 4
"Good Lord" (featuring Andy Mineo)	2022	—	42	—	—	—	—	—		Church Clothes 4
"We Did It" (featuring PJ Morton)	2022	—	33	—	—	—	—	—		Church Clothes 4
"CC4"	2022	—	35	—	—	—	—	—		Church Clothes 4
"Dirt"	2022	—	37	—	—	—	—	—		Church Clothes 4
"Holidaze" (with Jon Bellion)	2025	—	47	—	—	—	—		Reconstruction	
"—" denotes a recording that did not chart or was not released in that territory. Beginning in 2015, Billboard rendered most hip hop/rap songs ineligible for the gospel charts.

== Other appearances ==
List of other songs on which Lecrae has appeared
Title	Released	Album	Certifications
"Stand" (Da' T.R.U.T.H. featuring Flame and Lecrae)	2005	The Faith	
"No Silence" (Flame featuring Lecrae)	2005	Rewind	
"No More" (Tedashii featuring Lecrae)	2006	Kingdom People	
"In Ya Hood (Cypha Remix)" (Tedashii featuring Trip Lee, Thi'sl, Json, Sho, and Lecrae)	2006	Kingdom People	
"Cash or Christ" (Trip Lee featuring Lecrae)	2006	If They Only Knew	
"Conviction" (Dillon Chase featuring Lecrae)	2006	The Light	
"Move Back" (Thi'sl featuring Lecrae)	2007	This House I Shall Live	
"National Anthem (Remix)" (Mark J featuring Shabach, 2nd Nature, Promise, R-Swift, J Johnson, Truth, Lecrae, Japhia Life, and Triumph)	2007	Soulutions	
"Everyday All Day Cypha" (Everyday Process featuring Lecrae, The Ambassador, Flame, Phanatik, and R-Swift)	2007	Everyday Process: The Process of Illumination & Elimination	
"Jesus is Alive" (Shai Linne featuring Lecrae)	2007	The Legacy: Vol 1: Commissioned	
"Catch Me at the Brook" (Sho Baraka featuring Lecrae)	2007	Turn My Life Up	
"When the Thrill is Gone" (J.R. featuring Lecrae)	2007	Life by Stereo	
"Disciple Me (Remix)" (Cam featuring Lecrae)	2008	The Platform	
"Breatha" (R-Swift featuring Lecrae and Mac the Doulos)	2008	Soap Box	
"Who He Is" (Trip Lee featuring Cam and Lecrae)	2008	20/20	
"Who Is He" (Json featuring Lecrae)	2008	Life on Life	
"Punchlines" (Dry Bonez Live featuring Lecrae)	2008	Love & Loss	
"Checkin' for My God (Remix)" (The Ambassador featuring Lecrae and Trip Lee)	2008	The Chop Chop: From Milk to Meat	
"Transformers" (Tedashii featuring Lecrae and Trip Lee)	2009	rejected B-side to Identity Crisis	
"I Got Proof" (Katalyst featuring Lecrae)	2009	Death by Design	
"Exposed" (Benjah featuring Lecrae and Soyé)	2009	Filtered	
"Nothing Without You" (DJ Official featuring J.R. and Lecrae)	2009	Entermission	
"On My 116" (DJ Official featuring Lecrae, Tedashii, Sho Baraka, and Trip Lee)	2009	Entermission	
"26's (Chopped and Screwed)" (DJ Primo featuring Tedashii and Lecrae)	2009	non-album remix	
"Our Generation" (Michelle Bonilla featuring Lecrae and Flame)	2010	In Spite of Me	
"Shut Us Down" (Sho Baraka featuring Lecrae and After Edmund)	2010	Lions and Liars	
"Twisted" (Trip Lee featuring Lecrae, PRo, and Thi'sl)	2010	Between Two Worlds	
"No Worries Remix" (Trip Lee featuring Lecrae and Flame)	2010	Between Two Worlds	
"Clear the Air" (PRo featuring Lecrae)	2010	Redemption	
"Our God" (Chris Tomlin featuring Lecrae)	2011	Passion: Here for You	
"Welcome to H-Town II" (Wit and Dre Murray featuring Lecrae, Shei Atkins, and Von Won)	2011	Hells's Paradise II: Mask Parade	
"Calling You" (Jai featuring Lecrae)	2011	Culture Shock	
"Bring Us Home (Joshua)" (Michael Tait, Blanca Callahan, and Lecrae)	2011	Music Inspired by The Story	
"Let There Be Light" (Andy Mineo featuring Lecrae)	2011	Formerly Known	
"Made for More" (B. Reith featuring Lecrae and Lisa Gungor)	2011	How the Story Ends	
"Never Arrive" (theBREAX featuring Lecrae and J.R.)	2011	Never Arrive	
"New Shalom (Dubstep Remix)" (Karac featuring Lecrae and PRo)	2012	Rapzilla Presents... King Kulture	
"2 Human" (Json featuring Lecrae)	2012	Growing Pains	
"Nothing Without You (Future Jungle Remix)" (Karac featuring DJ Official, J.R., and Lecrae)	2012	non-album remix	
"Real Recognize Real" (Derek Minor featuring Lecrae and Pettidee)	2012	PSA Vol. 3: Who is Derek Minor?	
"Nobody Move" (808&Elite featuring Lecrae)	2012	Diamonds x Pearls	
"No Regrets (Dubstep Remix)" (Bryson Price featuring Lecrae and Suzy Rock)	2012	non-album remix	
"Radical" (S.O. featuring Lecrae and J. Williams)	2012	So It Continues	
"Hero" (Kareem Manuel featuring Lecrae)	2012	Until Forever	
"APB (Dubstep Remix)" (Bryson Price featuring Lecrae and Thi'sl)	2013	non-album remix	
"Uno Uno Seis" (Andy Mineo featuring Lecrae)	2013	Heroes for Sale	
"Fuss and Fight" (Scotty featuring Lecrae)	2013	F.A.I.T.H.	
"Round of Applause (Remix)" (Lecrae featuring B.o.B)	2013	Church Clothes 2	
"Let It Go (Young Girl)" (Emilio Rojas featuring Lecrae)	2013	No Shame... No Regrets	
"I Know Remix" (Black Knight featuring Lecrae)	2013	#ItsTheBlackKnight Beat Tape	
How We Do It" (Canon featuring Lecrae)	2013	Mad Haven	
"Be Inspired" (Pete Rock, Lecrae, and Rapsody)	2014	Jamla Is the Squad	
"Tell the World (Matthew Parker Remix)" (Matthew Parker featuring Lecrae and Mali Music)	2014	non-album remix	
"Im Turnt x Down for What (DJ Promote Mashup)" (DJ Promote featuring Lecrae, Lil Jon, DJ Snake)	2014	non-album remix	
Fall" (Michelle Williams featuring Lecrae and Tye Tribbett)	2014	Journey to Freedom	
"Fight Music" (KJ-52 featuring Lecrae and Propaganda)	2014	Mental	
Forgiveness [Neon Feather Remix]" (Toby Mac and Neon Feather featuring Lecrae)	2014	Eye'm All Mixed Up	
"Godline" (Tau featuring Lecrae)	2014	Remedium	
"Until the End of Time" (Derek Minor featuring Lecrae and Canon)	2015	Empire	
"Ready or Not (Phenomenon Remix)" (Soul Glow Activator featuring Britt Nicole and Lecrae)	2015	The Remixes	
"Sideways (for the Summer)" (Kuxiine featuring KB and Lecrae)	2015	non-album remix	
"Lord Be with Me" (Lecrae and Johntá Austin)	2016	Saints & Sinners: Original Soundtrack from Season 1	
"Illuminate" (Lecrae featuring Dria)	2016	non-album exclusive download	
"Looking for America" (Switchfoot featuring Lecrae)	2016	Where the Light Shines Through	
"On My Own" (Lecrae and Leon Bridges)	2016	The Birth of a Nation: The Inspired By Album	
"Here, 2016" (Sho Baraka featuring Lecrae)	2016	The Narrative	
"All I Am" (Trevor Jackson featuring Lecrae)	2018	Rough Drafts, Pt. 1	
"Please Forgive" (Lecrae with Sean Garrett and Crystal Nicole)	2018	Superfly	
"This Is Amazing Grace [Breakthrough Mix]" (Phil Wickham featuring Lecrae)	2019	Breakthrough (Music From & Inspired By The Motion Picture)	
"Fight for Me (Blue Miracle Version)" (Gawvi featuring Lecrae and Tommy Royale)	2021	Blue Miracle Soundtrack	
"Bad Things Happen to Good People" (Dax featuring Lecrae)	2021	Pain Paints Paintings	
"Respect My Team (Chopped and Screwed)" (Tedashii featuring Trip Lee and Lecrae)	2022	This Time Around 2	
"Bear With Me" (DMX featuring Lecrae)	2024	Let Us Pray: Chapter X	
"Lean (Extended Version)" (Still Shadey featuring Lecrae)	2025	Glorious News	
"I Needed God" (Tasha Cobbs Leonard featuring Lecrae)	2025	Tasha	

== Music videos ==
=== As lead artist ===
List music videos for which Lecrae is the lead artist
Title	Released	Director
"Jesus Muzik" (featuring Trip Lee and Tedashii)	October 16, 2006	Tripp Crosby
"Prayin for You"	June 11, 2007	Scott Leduc
"Don't Waste Your Life" (featuring Sho Baraka)	April 13, 2009	Edd Blott
"Go Hard" (featuring Tedashii)	October 6, 2009	Kevin Adamson
"Far Away"	July 13, 2010	Peter Ostebo
"Background" (featuring Andy Mineo)	October 8, 2010	David Ham
"Just Like You" (featuring J-Paul)	July 11, 2011	TK McKamy
"Church Clothes" (with cameos from Kendrick Lamar and DJ Premier)	May 3, 2012	Kyle Dettman
"Lord Have Mercy" (featuring Tedashii with a cameo from No Malice)	August 1, 2012	Motion Family
"Tell the World" (featuring Mali Music)	October 19, 2012	(Note: Kyle Dettman is credited as video editor)
"Mayday" (featuring Big K.R.I.T. and Ashthon Jones)	December 15, 2012	Motion Family
"Fakin'" (featuring Thi'sl)	February 1, 2013	Isaac Deitz
"Confe$$ions" (featuring David Banner)	April 30, 2013	Kyle Dettman
"I'm Turnt"	December 17, 2013	Steven C. Pitts
"All I Need Is You"	September 5, 2014	unknown
"Say I Won't" (featuring Andy Mineo)	December 16, 2014	Nathan Corrona
"Messengers" (featuring For King & Country)	December 31, 2014	Nathan Corrona
"Welcome To America"	April 9, 2015	Isaac Deitz
"Church Clothes 3: A Short Film" (featuring Propaganda, John Givez, JGivens, and Jackie Hill Perry)	January 15, 2016	Nathan Corrona
"Freedom" (featuring N'dambi)	January 18, 2016	Nathan Corrona
"Blessings" (featuring Ty Dolla Sign)	March 22, 2017	Calmatic
"I'll Find You" (featuring Tori Kelly)	July 28, 2017	Mike Mihail
"Broke"	December 5, 2017	Daniel Henry
"Get Back Right" (with Zaytoven)	June 18, 2018	Andrew Averso
"Set Me Free" (featuring YK Osiris)	March 20, 2020	Bobby Hanaford
"Deep End"	June 25, 2020	Aaron Chewning
"Drown" (featuring John Legend)	July 17, 2020	Aaron Chewning
"Zombie"	August 7, 2020	DeeKay Kwon
"Wheels Up" (featuring Marc E. Bassy)	September 14, 2020	Adam Thomason
"Everyday" (featuring Jidenna and Limoblaze)	October 29, 2021	Joe Gonzales, Fred Focus, and Jay Affluent
"Wildin" (Lecrae and 1K Phew)	November 17, 2021	Nathan Corrona
"Once Call" (Lecrae and 1K Phew)	December 3, 2021	Jerrell Lamar and Caleb Seales
"Move" (Lecrae and 1K Phew)	January 21, 2022	Jerrell Lamar and Caleb Seales
"Spread the Opps"	August 5, 2022	Ray Neutron
"Still In America"	November 4, 2022	Isaac Dietz
"Good Lord" (featuring Andy Mineo)	February 3, 2023	Nathan Corrona
"Lift Me Up" (Lecrae and Beam)	October 4, 2024	Ray Neutron
"Day One" (Childlike CiCi and Lecrae)	May 5, 2025	The Gentlemen
"The Method" (Lecrae and Miles Minnick, featuring E-40)	May 15, 2025	Manny Chaidez

=== As featured artist ===
Title	Released	Director(s)
"Joyful Noise" (Flame featuring Lecrae and John Reilly)	July 22, 2008	Tripp Crosby
"Keep Changing the World" (Mikeschair featuring Lecrae)	September 22, 2010	Shoes for Orphan Souls
"Dum Dum" (Tedashii featuring Lecrae)	October 5, 2011	Scott Leduc
"Live & Let Live" (Statik Selektah featuring Lecrae)	November 4, 2011	Todd Angkasuwan
"Never Arrive" (theBREAX featuring Lecrae and J.R.)	December 19, 2011	Sam Wells
"He's A A A Able" (The Nevels Sisters featuring Lecrae and PK)	November 10, 2011	Alvin Elmore
"I'm Good" (Trip Lee featuring Lecrae)	April 10, 2012	Kyle Dettman
"They Like Me" (KJ-52 featuring Lecrae)	April 25, 2012	Nathan Corrona
"Cray Button" (Family Force 5 featuring Lecrae and Meekakitty)	September 24, 2012	Isaac Deitz
"Radical" (S.O. featuring Lecrae and J. Williams)	November 18, 2012	Paul Akinrinlola
"Best Thing That I Found" (Saigon featuring Lecrae and DJ Corbett)	March 26, 2013	Rage
"Fuss N Fight" (Scotty featuring Lecrae)	September 30, 2013	A Color Brown Shot
"Help" (Erica Campbell featuring Lecrae)	February 11, 2014	Bille Woodruff
"Nothing I Can't Do" (Tedashii featuring Trip Lee and Lecrae)	June 5, 2014	Kyle Dettman
"This Is Living" (Hillsong Young & Free featuring Lecrae)	January 23, 2015	unknown
"Sideways" (KB featuring Lecrae)	April 15, 2015	Kyle Dettman
"Manolo" (Trip Lee featuring Lecrae)	November 24, 2015	Sam Brave
"Woke" (Reconcile featuring Lecrae	August 14, 2017	Ronnie Lillard
"Religion (Remix)" (PJ Morton featuring Lecrae)	December 20, 2017	Dustbrand Films
"Fight for Me" (Gawvi featuring Lecrae)	July 13, 2018	Anler Hernandez
"Unstoppable" (Koryn Hawthorne featuring Lecrae)	February 2, 2019	Casey Cross
"When I'm Around You" (Montell Jordan featuring Lecrae)	April 10, 2020	A.T. "Lumkile"
"Come Together" (Rodney Jerkins featuring Tim Bowman, Jr., Joy Enriquez, Kirk Franklin, Kelontae Gavin, Fred Hammond, Heavenly Joy, Le’Andria Johnson, Lecrae, Mary Mary, Jac Ross, Marvin Sapp, Karen Clark Sheard, Kierra Sheard, and Shelby 5)	May 1, 2020	unknown
"Reasons" (Hulvey featuring Lecrae and Svrcina)	February 19, 2021	Aaron Chewning
"Blessed Up (Remix)" (Wande featuring Lecrae and Mike Todd)	April 12, 2021	Keenon Rush John Dierre
"Paid for It (Remix)" (Ty Brasel featuring Lecrae and Melodie Wagner)	April 30, 2021	Bryan Mcadams Caleb Natale
"Been About It" (Andy Mineo featuring Lecrae)	October 14, 2021	Nathan Corrona
"Boom" (Shelby 5 featuring Lecrae)	January 3, 2022	unknown
"Respect My Team" (Tedashii featuring Trip Lee and Lecrae)	June 24, 2022	Nathan Corrona
"Jireh (My Provider)" (Limoblaze featuring Lecrae and Happi)	July 20, 2022	(Note: Created by Limoblaze & Jay Affluent)
"Big!" (Miles Minnick featuring Lecrae)	January 19, 2023	Garet Maddox
"Walk" (Hulvey featuring Lecrae)	June 23, 2023	James Hairston IV
"Miracles" (KB featuring Lecrae)	August 11, 2023	unknown
"Going My Way" (O'Bros featuring Lecrae)	September 1, 2023	Rob Schatz
"No Weapon (Remix)" (Scootie Wop featuring Lecrae and Fred Hammond)	January 19, 2024	Andrew Paul
"Judas" (YeloHill featuring Lecrae)	January 19, 2024	HitTown
"To Hell with the Devil (Rise)" (For King and Country featuring Lecrae and Stryper)	April 5, 2024	unknown
"Ready Now" (Jeremy Camp featuring Lecrae)	July 19, 2024	unknown
"Lean" (Still Shadey featuring Lecrae)	August 7, 2024	COE Visuals
"So What" (DOE featuring Lecrae)	September 5, 2024	unknown
