= We Did It =

We Did It or WeDidIt may refer to:

== Music ==
- WeDidIt, a record label co-founded by Shlohmo

=== Albums ===
- We Did It, by George McCrae, 1978

=== Songs ===
- "We Did It", by Missy Elliot from Da Real World, 1999
- "We Did It", by Lecrae from Church Clothes 4, 2022
- "We Did It", by Area21, 2023
- "We Did It", by Kanye West from Donda 2, 2025
- "We Did It!", from the Dora the Explorer soundtrack, 2004
- "WeDidIt", by Ken Carson and Playboi Carti from Xperiment, 2026
- "We Did It (Positivity Song)", by Lil Yachty from Lil Boat, 2016

== Other uses ==
- We Did It (film), a 1936 short film starring Betty Boop
- WeDidIt, a crowdfunding company
