= Round of Applause =

Round of Applause may refer to:

- "Round of Applause" (Waka Flocka Flame song), 2011
- "Round of Applause" (Lecrae song), 2013
