= Church Clothes 4 =

Mixtape by Lecrae
- Released: November 4, 2022
- Genre: Christian hip hop
- Length: 41:16
- Label: Reach Records
- Producers: Juberlee; Ace Harris; Connor Back; theBeatbreaker; DrumGod; Dude Clayy; Simbo; JuanRa; Sims Cashion; Jaden Eli; WEARETHEGOOD; SlikkMuzik; Alex Goose; Matt Zara; Andy Mineo; Dylan Hyde; Leslie Johnson; Curious George; Joel McNeill; Carvello; Lil' Ronnie; CuBeatz; Vinnyforgood; Luis Bacqué; Lecrae; KelbyOnTheTrack; Lyle Leduff; Don Cannon; NIQ Maximus; Andrew Prim; Honorable C.N.O.T.E.; M-80; Luke Crowder; Mike & Keys; Money Jezu$; 206Derek; Dunk Rock; Elkan; Steven Shaeffer; Splitmind

Lecrae chronology
No Church in a While (2021)	Church Clothes 4 (2022)	Get Well Soon (2025)

Singles from Church Clothes 4
- 1. "Spread the Opps" Released: August 5, 2022; 2. "Fear Not" Released: October 26, 2022

Church Clothes 4 is a 2022 mixtape from Christian hip hop artist Lecrae, released on November 4 through his own label Reach Records. It constitutes the final installment of his Church Clothes mixtape series begun in 2012. It includes featured appearances from Andy Mineo, PJ Morton, A.I. the Anomaly, Jon Keith, nobigdyl., WHATUPRG, and Jordan L’Oreal. Two singles were released from the mixtape — "Spread the Opps", on August 5, 2022, and "Fear Not", on October 26, 2022. A deluxe edition of the album, Church Clothes 4: Dry Clean Only, was released February 24, 2023.

== Background and recording ==
Lecrae released the first installment of his mixtape series, Church Clothes, in the summer of 2012. Hosted by DJ Don Cannon, it was intended to exemplify Lecrae's authenticity to both hip hop and his Christian faith. Within 48 hours of its release for free on Datpiff.com, the mixtape was downloaded over 100,000 times. Two more mixtapes followed in subsequent years: Church Clothes 2 in 2013 and Church Clothes 3 in 2016. Lecrae's tenth studio album, Restoration (2020), was announced to be possibly his last studio endeavor, but Lecrae held out the possibility of future mixtapes. He told Rapzilla in 2020 that “...I'll probably do some mixtapes, but I don't know if I'm making another full-featured album. It's a younger generation right now man, so you know, I feel like I may give them another Church Clothes and close a chapter out." In 2021, he and labelmate 1K Phew released the collaborative album No Church in a While. In January 2022, he announced Church Clothes 4. On August 4, 2022, a press release from Reach Records stated that Church Clothes 4 was forthcoming and that it would close out the Church Clothes series. "We did Vol 1, 2, and 3, only right that we keep the legacy with Vol.4. Church Clothes 4 is the last one though!" On September 29, 2022, Lecrae stated in an interview that the previously hinted at J. Cole feature did not materialize.

== Release ==
Two singles preceded the mixtape's release. "Spread the Opps", produced by DrumGod, JuanRa, Simbo, and DudeClayy, was released on August 5, 2022. It was accompanied by a music video directed by Ray Neutron. A second single, "Fear Not", was released on October 26, 2022, and was produced by Lecrae, Juberlee, Cubeatz, and Vinnyforgood. Church Clothes 4 was released on November 4, 2022, on digital platforms and for CD pre-order. A music video for the song "Still in America", directed by Isaac Dietz, from the album was released on the same day.

== Content and style ==
Preezy Brown from Vibe noted Lecrae's lyricism, apparent immediately on the first track, "CC4", and contemplative and uplifting moments of thought. A major theme of the mixtape is Lecrae's faith deconstruction and coming to accept himself. Another is the need for healing and for people to work together. "Spread the Opps", according to Lecrae, is about him being rejected by others but still holding his own. The song references Genesis 3 as well as Romans 1:16. On "Still in America", Lecrae tried to explore the nuance and diversity of experiences of Americans and try to find unity through common ground. "Take Me Up" includes a sample from the group Bone Thugs-n-Harmony. Lecrae stated in an interview with Holy Culture that after the first Church Clothes mixtape came out, Krayzie Bone sought him out for conversation. "Fear Not" follows Lecrae's journey from sin to salvation. Ken Partridge from Genius noted that the song's music and lyrics have a "chilly horror-movie vibe" that were perfect for late October. The chorus references Halloween and Partridge considered the first verse, which ends with Lecrae resigned to an early death, to be "pure psychological horror". The song then interludes with Psalm 23:4–6, and the Psalm is then called back to in the second verse. The direct quotes of the Psalm are in Portuguese and Yoruba. The song also references Lecrae's pressuring of a then-girlfriend into getting an abortion. On the final song, "Deconstruction", Lecrae recounts his deconstruction and reconstruction, which was triggered just before the fall of 2015. After Lecrae tweeted about the killing of Michael Brown, he encountered backlash from many Christians online and was further hurt by the response he received from pastor Voddie Baucham. Lecrae fell into clinical depression. As he worked through his church trauma, he came to the conclusion that Western society has twisted the teachings of Christianity and so he reconstructed his faith with a more Eastern context instead. Lecrae said in his interview with Holy Culture that this song was one of four that he feels he was prompted by God to write.

== Critical reception ==
Professional ratings
Review scores
Source	Rating
Jesus Freak Hideout	4/5 stars

Matt Baldwin of Jesus Freak Hideout rated the mixtape four stars out of five, describing it as an "autobiographical telling of his deconstruction journey that ultimately lead to his reconstruction and strengthening of his faith... [shining] like a beacon for those walking through the valley of the shadow of death".

== Track list ==
No.	Title	Writer(s)	Producer(s)	Length
1.	"CC4"	Lecrae Moore; Nate Robinson; Jeffrey Lawrence Shannon; Lasanna "Ace" Harris; Connor Back; Alexandria Dollar; Mohamed Elkhalifa; James Colwell	Juberlee; Ace Harris; Connor Back; theBeatbreaker	1:47
2.	"Spread the Opps"	Moore; Harris; Clayton Rogers; Brice Sibomana; Juan Ramón Luis Melián; Robert Labraunte Gullatt; Deandre Hunter Dollar	DrumGod; Dude Clayy; Simbo; JuanRa	3:01
3.	"Dirt"	Moore; Shannon; Sims Cashion; Jaden Eli; Dollar	Juberlee; Sims Cashion; Jaden Eli	2:57
4.	"Still In America"	Moore; Wesley Eugene Smith; Quinten John Coblentz; Robinson	WEARETHEGOOD; theBeatbreaker	3:21
5.	"Misconceptions 4" (featuring nobigdyl., Jon Keith, and A.I. The Anomaly)	Moore; Dylan Phillips; Jon Keith; Aitina Fareed-Cooke; Rickey Offord; Jakob Zimmerman; Dollar; Montell Jordan	SlikkMuzik	3:52
6.	"Good Lord" (featuring Andy Mineo)	Moore; Andrew Mineo; Alex Goose; Matt Zara; Harris	Alex Goose; Matt Zara; Andy Mineo	3:07
7.	"I-45 Freestyle" (additional vocals from Tedashii)	Moore; Dylan Hyde; Leslie Johnson; Curious George Robinson; Michael Girgenti; Dollar; Tedashii Lavoy Anderson	Dylan Hyde; Leslie Johnson; Curious George; theBeatbreaker	1:49
8.	"Take Me Up" (featuring WHATUPRG)	Moore; J. Raul Garcia; Harris; Joel McNeill; Ryan Bert; Robin William; Ernie Isley; Marvin Isley; O'Kelly Isley, Jr.; Ronald Isley; Rudolph Isley; Steven Howse; Anthony Henderson; Bryon Anthony McCane II; Charles C. Scruggs, Jr.; Danny Towers	Ace Harris; Joel McNeill; Carvello; theBeatbreaker	3:11
9.	"Protect My Peace" (featuring Jordan L'Oreal)	Moore; Jordan L’Oreal; Dollar; Ronnie Jackson; Harris; Hunter	Lil' Ronnie; Ace Harris; theBeatbreaker	2:53
10.	"Fear Not"	Moore; Shannon; Kevin Gomringer; Tim Gomringer; Luis Bacqué; Vincent Dean Verdi; Dollar	Juberlee; CuBeatz; Vinnyforgood; Luis Bacqué; Lecrae	3:17
11.	"We Did It" (featuring PJ Morton)	Lecrae; L’Oreal; Dollar; Offord; Hunter	SlikkMuzik; KelbyOnTheTrack; Coop The Truth	3:13
12.	"Journey"	Moore; Lyle Anthony Leduff, Jr.; Donald Cannon; Jaron Allen; Harold Allen	Lyle Leduff; Don Cannon; NIQ Maximus; theBeatbreaker	4:33
13.	"Deconstruction"	Moore; Harris; McNeill; Andrew Prim; Robinson	Ace Harris; Joel McNeill; Andrew Prim; theBeatbreaker	4:09
Total length:				41:16

Dry Clean Only Deluxe Edition
No.	Title	Writer(s)	Producer(s)	Length
14.	"They Ain't Know"	Moore; Carlton Davis Mays, Jr.	Honorable C.N.O.T.E.	3:12
15.	"Double R Dreamin" (featuring Urstrulyxyz)	Moore; Turrell Thomas Sims; Dollar; Darwin Cordale Quinn; Luke Crowder; Cody Hao Duan; Heath Jackson	C Gutta; Luke Crowder; Cody Hao Duan; Heath Jackson	2:44
16.	"Can You Hear Me Now?" (featuring D Smoke)	Moore; Daniel Anthony Farris; Quinn; Michael Ray Cox, Jr.; John Groover; Jacob Guyton; Dollar	C Gutta; Luke Crowder; Mike & Keys; Classified Alias	3:00
17.	"Price Up" (featuring Torey D'Shaun)	Moore; Torey D'Shaun; Lucas DiFabbio; Derek Anderson; Desmond South; 8ae; Stan Greene, Jr.; Deandre Hunter	Money Jezu$; 206Derek; Dunk Rock	2:51
18.	"Legacy" (featuring J Paul the Carpenter)	Moore; Jared Foster; Bert; Andrew Andriyashev; Mic Lovay; Nisan Joseph; Timothy Mingo; Paul Omar Elkan Agyei; Steven Shaeffer; Aidan Crotinger; Derek Andrew Kastal; Marcus Fitzgerald Rucker, Jr.; Verdi	Carvello; Elkan; Steven Shaeffer; Splitmind; Vinnyforgood	3:20
19.	"Best Thing" (featuring Rotimi)	Moore; Olurotimi Akinosho; Bert; Harris; Dollar	Carvello; Ace Harris	3:12
Total length:				59:35

== Credits ==
- Lecrae Moore - primary artist, production on "Fear Not"
- Tori Palmatier - executive producer
- Kevin Hackett - artwork
- Ray Neutron - artwork
- nobigdyl. - featured artist on "Misconceptions 4"
- Jon Keith - featured artist on "Misconceptions 4"
- A.I. The Anomaly - featured artist on "Misconceptions 4"
- Tedashii - additional vocals on "I-45 Freestyle"
- Andy Mineo - featured artist and production on "Good Lord"
- WHATUPRG - featured artist on "Take Me Up"
- Jordan L'Oreal - featured artist on "Protect My Peace", additional writing on "We Did It"
- PJ Morton - featured artist on "We Did It"
- Urstrulyxyz - featured artist on "Double R Dreamin'"
- D Smoke - featured artist on "Can You Hear Me Now?"
- Torey D'Shaun - featured artist on "Price Up"
- J Paul the Carpenter - featured artist on "Legacy"
- Rotimi - featured artist on "Best Thing"
- Juberlee - production on "CC4", "Dirt", and "Fear Not"
- Ace Harris - production on "CC4", "Take Me Up", "Protect My Peace", and "Best Thing", "Deconstruction", additional writing on "Spread the Opps" and "Good Lord"
- Connor Back - production on "CC4"
- theBeatbreaker - production on "CC4", "Still in America", "I-45 Freestyle", "Take Me Up", "Protect My Peace", "Journey", and "Deconstruction"
- DrumGod - production on "Spread the Opps"
- Dude Clayy - production on "Spread the Opps"
- Simbo - production on "Spread the Opps"
- JuanRa - production on "Spread the Opps"
- Sims Cashion - production on "Dirt"
- Jaden Eli - production on "Dirt"
- WEARETHEGOOD - production on "Still in America"
- Slikk Muzik - production on "Misconceptions 4" and "We Did It"
- Alex Goose - production on "Good Lord"
- Matt Zara - production on "Good Lord"
- Dylan Hyde - production on "I-45 Freestyle"
- Leslie Johnson - production on "I-45 Freestyle"
- Curious George - production on "I-45 Freestyle"
- Joel McNeill - production on "Take Me Up" and "Deconstruction"
- Carvello - production on "Take Me Up", "Legacy", and "Best Thing"
- Lil' Ronnie - production on "Protect My Peace"
- CuBeatz - production on "Fear Not"
- Vinnyforgood - production on "Fear Not", "Legacy", and "Best Thing"
- Luis Bacqué - production on "Fear Not"
- KelbyOnTheTrack - production on "We Did It"
- Lyle Leduff - production on "Journey"
- Don Cannon - production on "Journey"
- NIQ Maximus - production on "Journey"
- Andrew Prim - production on "Deconstruction"
- Honorable C.N.O.T.E. - production on "They Ain't Know"
- C Gutta - production on "Double R Dreamin" and "Can You Hear Me Now?"
- Luke Crowder - production on "Double R Dreamin" and "Can You Hear Me Now?"
- Cody Hao Duan - production on "Double R Dreamin"
- Heath Jackson - production on "Double R Dreamin"
- Mike & Keys - production on "Can You Hear Me Now?"
- Classified Alias - production on "Can You Hear Me Now?"
- Money Jezu$ - production on "Price Up"
- 206Derek - production on "Price Up"
- Dunk Rock - production on "Price Up"
- Elkan - production on "Legacy"
- Steven Shaeffer - production on "Legacy"
- Splitmind - production on "Legacy"
- Alexandria Dollar - writing on "CC4", "Spread the Opps", "Dirt", "Misconceptions 4", "We Did It", "Double R Dreamin", "Can You Hear Me Now?", and "Best Thing"
- Mido - writing on "CC4"
- Deandre Hunter - writing on "Spread the Opps", "Protect My Peace", and "We Did It"
- Jakob Zimmerman - writing on "Misconceptions 4"
- Montell Jordan - writing on "Misconceptions 4"
- Harold Allen - writing on "Journey"
- 8ae - writing on "Price Up"
- Stan Greene, Jr. - writing on "Price Up"
- Deandre Hunter - writing on "Price Up"
- Andrew "Triple A" Andriyashev - writing on "Legacy"
- Mic Lovay - writing on "Legacy"
- Nisan Joseph - writing on "Legacy"
- Bolo Da Producer - writing on "Legacy"
- Kas - writing on "Legacy"
- Motif Alumni - writing on "Legacy
- Ryan Plumley - orchestration on "CC4", "Still in America", "I-45 Freestyle", "Take Me Up", "Protect My Peace", "Journey", and "Deconstruction"
- Todd Simon - orchestration on "Good Lord"
- Matt Zara - orchestration on "Good Lord"
- Paul Spring - orchestration on "Good Lord"
- Joe Harrison - orchestration on "Good Lord"
- Natarsha Garcia - choir conductor on "Spread the Opps"
- Brandin Jay - choir conductor on "Spread the Opps"
- Jacob “Biz” Morris - studio personnel on "Spread the Opps"
- Connor Back - studio personnel on "Spread the Opps"
- Jasper Thomas aka DJ Ovadose - associated performer on "They Ain't Know"

== Charts ==
Chart (2022)	Peak position
US Top Christian Albums (Billboard)	2
