= All Things Work Together =

Studio album by Lecrae
- Released: September 22, 2017
- Recorded: 2015–2017
- Genre: Christian hip hop
- Length: 54:08
- Label: Reach; Columbia
- Producer: Alex Medina; Ayo; Boi-1da; Danny Majic; Dem Jointz; DJ Dahi; DJ Frank E; DJ Khalil; Go Grizzly; J. Hill; John Toluwani; Keyz; Metro Boomin; Mike & Keys; Nikhil Seetharam; No I.D.; REO; Swoope; T-Minus; Tane Runo; Tariq Beats; Taylor Hill; Pluss

Lecrae chronology
Church Clothes 3 (2016)	All Things Work Together (2017)	Let the Trap Say Amen (2018)

Singles from All Things Work Together
- 1. "Can't Stop Me Now (Destination)" Released: October 21, 2016; 2. "Blessings" Released: January 27, 2017; 3. "I'll Find You" Released: June 9, 2017; 4. "Broke" Released: October 31, 2017

All Things Work Together is the eighth studio album by American Christian hip hop artist Lecrae, released on September 22, 2017, through Reach Records and Columbia Records, also making it his first major label release. The album features appearances from Tori Kelly, Ty Dolla Sign, 1K Phew, Kierra Sheard, Taylor Hill, Aha Gazelle, Jawan Harris and Verse Simmonds.

== Background ==
All Things Work Together follows to Lecrae's 2016 mixtape Church Clothes 3 and 2014 studio album Anomaly.

In December 2016, Lecrae confirmed that a new album was in the works for 2017 in an interview with Rapzilla. He kept details of the features under wraps, saying he's been in the studio with "a lot of people", but did however confirm Tori Kelly was featured.

Upon his signing with Columbia Records, Lecrae worked with producers such as Boi-1da, T-Minus, Pluss, Dem Jointz, REO, Go Grizzly, Ayo the Producer, Swoope and DJ Frank E.

The album title, All Things Work Together is a biblical reference to Romans 8:28.

In an interview with Billboard, Lecrae explained the message of the album and the creative process by saying: "This was a hard project for me. It took a long time. I recorded about 60-70 records, and these 14 are the ones that stuck. It was a lot of emotional stuff, and we we're like, 'We need to find some light in the midst of all these songs,' because they sounded so dark......I hope that they understand there is hope in the chaos. I hope that they get that God loves them and there is nothing they can do about it – it's an unrelenting pursuit of you – and I want people to feel that. I want people to feel that they can make it."

== Promotion ==
On October 21, 2016, Lecrae released the album's lead single "Can't Stop Me Now (Destination)". On January 21, 2017, he released the second single "Blessings" featuring Ty Dolla Sign. In June 2017, Lecrae released "I'll Find You" as the featuring Tori Kelly as the third single and "Hammer Time" featuring 1K Phew as a promotional single. On August 8, 2017, Lecrae announced the title of the album, All Things Work Together.

== Concerts and touring ==
On August 3, 2017, Lecrae was a guest on Nick Cannon's Wild 'n Out, where he also performed "Blessings".

On August 8, 2017, Lecrae announced the All Things Work Together tour along with the album title. The Tour will be starting on October 4 running through December 5, stopping through 24 cities throughout North America.

On September 22, 2017, Lecrae performed "I'll Find You" with Tori Kelly on ABC's Good Morning America.

On December 21, 2017, Lecrae performed "Broke" on BET's The Rundown With Robin Thede.

In January 2018, a second leg of the All Things Work Together tour was announced, running from February to June in the United States, Europe and Africa.

== Critical reception ==
Professional ratings
Review scores
Source	Rating
HipHopDX	(4.1/5)
Jesus Freak Hideout	3/5 stars
Jesus Freak Hideout	4/5 stars

Writing for Jesus Freak Hideout, David Craft awarded the album three out of five stars, lamenting that "the album is not as subversive as it thinks, and much of its construct seems to rely on [that] meretricious assumption," and concludes by noting that "All Things Work Together is a middle-of-the-road album." Also writing for Jesus Freak Hideout, Kevin Hoskins had a more favorable opinion, and in his four star review, stated that "throughout All Things Works Together, the production is hot, Crae spits fire, and most tracks are worthy to be on any Reach release." Aaron McKrell of HipHopDX described the album as "Lecrae at his rawest". He praised the content of the album by saying "......is the culmination of Lecrae’s unapologetic faith combined with his ambition to spread his message through Hip Hop. His naked honesty and knack for conveying relatable emotions make the album one of his best projects to date."

== Commercial performance ==
All Things Work Together debuted at number 11 on the Billboard 200 selling 29,227 equivalent copies (20,322 in pure album sales). It also charted at number 1 on the Christian Albums Chart and number 6 on the Rap Albums chart.

== Track listing ==
Credits adapted from the album's liner notes.

All Things Work Together
No.	Title	Writer(s)	Producer(s)	Length
1.	"Always Knew"	Lecrae Moore; Ramon Owen	REO	3:34
2.	"Facts"	Dwayne Abernathy, Jr.; Moore	Dem Jointz	4:01
3.	"Broke" (featuring Perfekt)	Wesley Jams; Moore; Tyler Williams; Nikhil Seetharam; Matthew Samuels	T-Minus; Seetharam^{[a]}; Boi-1da^{[b]}	2:59
4.	"Blessings" (featuring Ty Dolla Sign)	Allen Swoope II; Asheton Hogan; Moore; Maurice Simmonds; Tyrone Griffin, Jr.	Pluss	3:51
5.	"Whatchu Mean" (featuring Aha Gazelle)	Cameron Wallace; Kevin Price; Moore; William Fields, Jr.	Go Grizzly	4:20
6.	"Hammer Time" (featuring 1K Phew)	Moore; Leland Wayne; Glenn Gordon II	Metro Boomin	3:34
7.	"Come and Get Me"	Moore; Dacoury Natche; Ernest Wilson	DJ Dahi; No I.D.	4:12
8.	"Lucked Up" (featuring Nija)	Khalil Abdul; Nija Charles; Altariq Crapps; John Groover; Michael Cox, Jr.; Moore	DJ Khalil; Tariq Beats; Mike & Keys	3:40
9.	"Wish You the Best" (featuring Verse Simmonds)	Joseph Hill; Moore; Tane Runo; Simmonds; Natalie Sims	J. Hill; Runo	3:44
10.	"Can't Stop Me Now (Destination)" (featuring Childish Major)	Moore; Alex Medina; Sufjan Stevens; Markus Randle	Medina; John Toluwani	4:10
11.	"I'll Find You" (featuring Tori Kelly)	Justin Franks; Moore; John Mitchell; Sasha Sloan; Danny Majic; Sims; Victoria Kelly	DJ Frank E; Majic	3:37
12.	"8:28" (featuring Lewis Sky)	Austin Owens; James Foye III; Moore; Jeremiah Bethea	Ayo; Keyz	3:09
13.	"Cry for You" (featuring Taylor Hill)	Moore; Taylor Hill; Swoope	Swoope; Taylor Hill	4:23
14.	"Worth It" (featuring Kierra Sheard and Jawan Harris)	Swoope; Jawan Harris; Moore; Sims	Swoope	4:54
Total length:				54:08

Notes

- ^{^[a]} signifies a co-producer
- ^{^[b]} signifies an additional producer

Sample credits

- "Can't Stop Me Now (Destination)" contains elements from "Djohariah", written and performed by Sufjan Stevens
- "8:28" contains elements from "Indecision", written and performed by Sampha.

== Personnel ==
- 1K Phew – featured artist
- Aha Gazelle – featured artist
- Alex Medina – producer
- Ayo the Producer – producer
- Boi-1da – additional production
- Childish Major – vocals
- Colin Leonard – mastering engineer
- Danny Majic – producer
- Dem Jointz – producer
- DJ Dahi – producer, sleigh bells
- DJ Frank E – producer
- DJ Khalil – producer
- Don Clark – art direction, graphic design
- Ekemini Uwan – additional vocals
- Fernando Cuellar – assistant engineer
- Go Grizzly – producer
- J Stevenson – recording engineer
- John Lanier - recording engineer
- J-Hill – producer, electric guitar
- Jacob "Biz" Morris – recording engineer, mixing engineer
- Jason Romero – assistant engineer
- Jawan Harris – featured artist
- Jeremy Stevenson – A&R
- John Horesco IV – mastering engineer
- Jonathan Azu – A&R
- Joshua Kissi – photography
- Keyzbaby – producer, keyboards
- Kiarra Sheard – featured artist
- Koen Heldens – mixing engineer
- Manny Marroquin - mixing engineer
- Scott Desmarais - mixing engineer
- Robin Florent - mixing engineer
- Miles Walker - mixing engineer
- Lecrae – primary artist
- Lewis Sky – additional vocals
- Metro Boomin – producer
- Natalie Lauren – A&R
- Nija – featured artist, additional vocals
- Nikhil "Kromatik" Seetharam – co-producer
- No I.D. – producer, bass guitar
- Perfekt – vocals
- PLUSS – producer
- Ramon "REO" Owen – producer
- Ryan Jumper – assistant engineer
- Swoope – producer, keyboards
- T-Minus – producer
- Tane Runo – producer
- Tariq Beats – producer
- Taylor Hill – producer, featured artist, keyboards
- The Futuristiks – producer
- Tony Evans – additional vocals
- Ty Dolla $ign – featured artist
- Verse Simmonds – featured artist
- Wordsplayed – producer
- Zach Paradis – recording engineer
- Devvon Terrell – recording engineer

== Charts ==
Chart (2017)	Peak position
Belgian Albums (Ultratop Wallonia)	160
Canadian Albums (Billboard)	69
New Zealand Heatseekers Albums (RMNZ)	3
US Billboard 200	11
US Top Christian Albums (Billboard)	1
US Top R&B/Hip-Hop Albums (Billboard)	8
US Top Rap Albums (Billboard)	6
