= Trilliam 2 =

EP by Aha Gazelle
- Released: June 9, 2017
- Recorded: 2016
- Genre: Hip hop
- Length: 29:14
- Label: Reach
- Producer: Aha Gazelle

Aha Gazelle chronology
Trilliam (2016)	Trilliam 2 (2017)	Trilliam 3 (2017)

Singles from Trilliam 2
- 1. "Momma House" Released: April 21, 2017

Trilliam 2 is the second extended play by American rapper Aha Gazelle. It was his first project since signing with Reach Records. It was released on June 9, 2017 via iTunes and Spotify. It was followed by Trilliam 3, released on November 3, 2017, the final installment in a trilogy of EPs that began with Trilliam in 2016.

== Promotion ==
The EP's first single "Momma House" was released April 21, 2017 and its accompanying music video on May 23, 2017. "Keep It in the Family" was released as a promotional single on June 20, 2017 and was featured in an episode of Comedy Central's Hood Adjacent with James Davis.

== Critical reception ==
Professional ratings
Review scores
Source	Rating
HotNewHipHop	4 stars on a 5-point scale
Jesusfreakhideout	4.5 stars on a 5-point scale

The album has received positive reviews since its release.

== Track listing ==
No.	Title	Length
1.	"The Price Is Always Right"	4:17
2.	"Twentylemhunnidmillion"	5:23
3.	"Momma House" (featuring MC Fiji)	3:53
4.	"Keep It in the Family"	3:44
5.	"All Gold Party"	4:04
6.	"Another Sauce Song"	4:22
7.	"No Haircut Talk 2" (featuring Reg Rob)	0:37
8.	"Vegeta"	3:26
Total length:		29:14
