= O'Bros =

German Christian hip-hop group

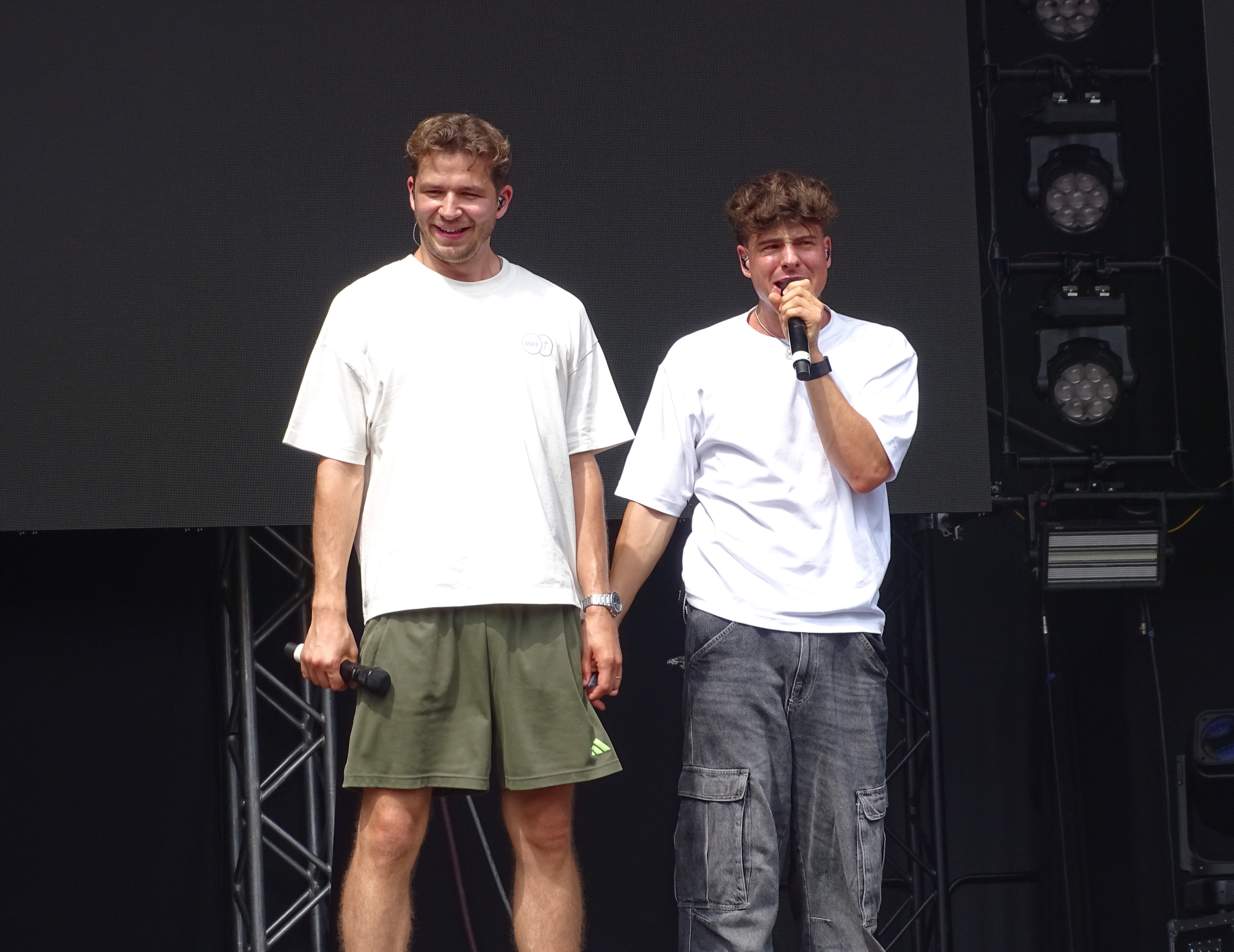
- O'Bros in 2024

Background information
- Origin: Munich, Germany
- Genres: Christian hip hop
- Years active: 2015–present
- Members: Maximilian Oberschelp; Alexander Oberschelp
- Website: obros.eu

O'Bros is a German Christian hip hop duo. The duo consists of brothers Maximilian (born 20 April 1996) and Alexander Oberschelp (12 September 1997).

== History ==
The Oberschelp brothers began writing songs and performing in public as children. They completed classical musical training and, as teenagers, taught themselves music production. At the end of 2022, Maximilian successfully completed his studies in dentistry. A few months later, Alexander completed his studies in business administration.

In 2015, the O'Bros released their first studio album, R.A.P. They financed their second album, Exodus, through crowdfunding in 2017. The brothers compose and produce their songs themselves. In 2018, they had a total of 50 performances in Germany, Austria, and Switzerland. In 2019, they won the SPH Band Contest, which, with approximately 2,000 participating bands, is considered the largest competition of its kind for young talent in German-speaking countries.

Their album Kein Hype was released in 2020. It reached number 92 in the Swiss charts for one week. In June 2021, the O'Bros released the single "Real Life" about the life story of Philipp Mickenbecker, and in November 2021, the EP "Real Life" with five songs was released. In the summer of 2022, they held their first solo tour with 12 dates in Germany, Austria, and Switzerland, which was completely sold out. In September 2023, they gained international attention with "Going My Way," a collaboration with Grammy-winning American rapper Lecrae. Shortly thereafter, their fourth album, Underrated, was released, reaching number two in the German album charts and number one in the German hip-hop charts. Their "Underrated Tour", which followed a few weeks later, was also sold out.

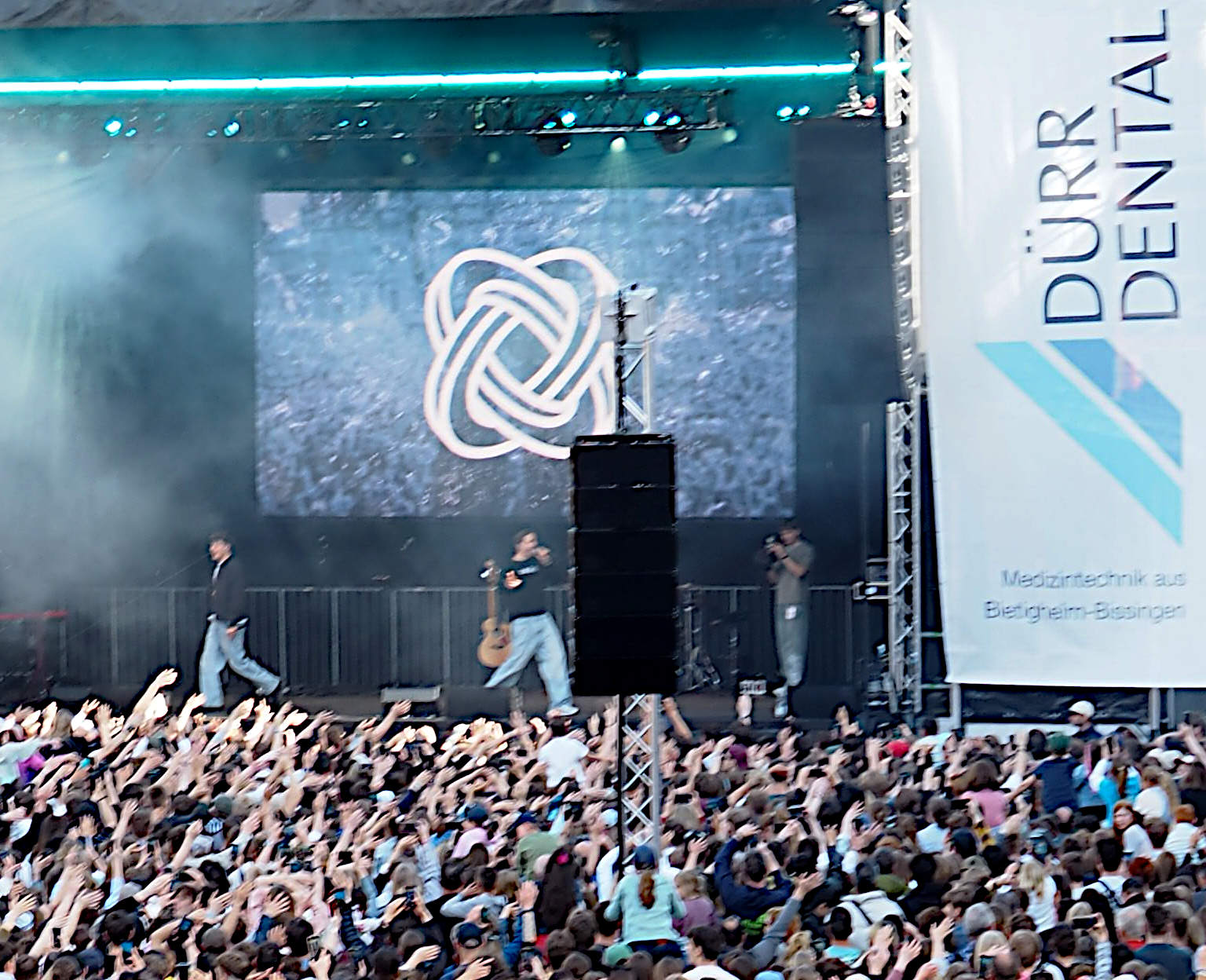
Public performance in Stuttgart 2025

== Discography ==
=== Studio albums ===
List of studio albums, with selected chart positions
Title	Details	Peak chart positions		
Title	Details	GER	AUT	SWI
R.A.P.	Released: 30 October 2015; Label: Self-released; Format: CD, digital download, streaming	—	—	—
Exodus	Released: 14 December 2017; Label: Self-released; Format: CD, digital download, streaming	—	—	—
Kein Hype	Released: 22 May 2020; Label: Self-released; Format: CD, digital download, streaming	—	—	92
Underrated	Released: 15 September 2023; Label: Self-released; Format: CD, digital download, streaming	2	—	23
To Be Honest.	Released: 28 March 2025; Label: Self-released; Format: CD, digital download, streaming	1	8	2
"—" denotes a title that did not chart, or was not released in that territory.

EPs

- 2021: Real Life
- 2025: Dekade
