= I'm Turnt =

Single by Lecrae

from the album Church Clothes, Vol. 2
- Released: October 18, 2013
- Genre: Christian hip hop
- Label: Reach Records
- Songwriters: K. Erondu; L. Moore
- Producer: K.E. on the Track

Lecrae singles chronology
"Round of Applause" (2013)	"I'm Turnt" (2013)	"Nuthin'" (2014)

"I'm Turnt" is a song performed by Christian hip hop artist Lecrae for his second mixtape Church Clothes 2 (2013). It was released on October 18, 2013, by Reach Records as the second single from the record. An accompanying music video was released on December 17, 2013.

== Lyrics and style ==
The song contains a "smooth, snappy, contagious backdrop". Lyrically, Lecrae speaks about "the ways of the club, staying true to himself while having some fun."

== Reception ==
Jake Rohn from BET wrote: "Lecrae nods again to Lamar (and the shifting consciousness of the mainstream) on the K.E. on the Track-produced, 'I'm Turnt,' satirically flipping a club-friendly sound to create an anti-Molly anthem." In its review of the whole mixtape, HipHopDX wrote: "At worst, songs like 'I’m Turnt' come off just as stylistically unimaginative as anything on the radio or BET. But they’ll earn points for offering substance—even if it occasionally appears in the form of clichés, such as talk of 'being high on the spirit, bro.' " In October 2013, Lecrae performed the song BET's 106 & Park.

=== Charts ===
Chart (2013)	Peak position
US Christian Digital Songs	6
US Christian Streaming Songs	13
US Hot Christian Songs	19

== Music video ==
Filming of the music video took place in November 2013 in Atlanta, Georgia. The video, directed by Steven C Pitts and edited by Kyle Dettman, was released on December 17, 2013. It depicts Lecrae "attending a house party, only it’s turnt up by his faith in the Lord." Jesse James of StupidDope described the video as "a fitting set of visuals".
