= Let the Trap Say Amen =

Studio album by Lecrae and Zaytoven
- Released: June 22, 2018
- Recorded: 2018
- Genre: Trap; Christian hip hop
- Length: 41:13
- Label: Reach
- Producer: Zaytoven

Lecrae chronology
All Things Work Together (2017)	Let the Trap Say Amen (2018)	Restoration (2020)

Zaytoven chronology
Trap Holizay (2018)	Let the Trap Say Amen (2018)	A (2018)

Singles from Let the Trap Say Amen
- 1. "Get Back Right" Released: June 1, 2018; 2. "Plugged In" Released: June 15, 2018

Let the Trap Say Amen is a collaborative studio album by American rapper Lecrae and American record producer Zaytoven, released on June 22, 2018, through Reach Records. The album features guest appearances from Waka Flocka Flame, K-So Jaynes, ShySpeaks, 24hrs, nobigdyl. and Verse Simmonds.

== Background ==
In May 2018, Lecrae announced the album on his Instagram page.

Following the announcement, Lecrae published an editorial with DJBooth explaining the story behind the project. "Lecrae first writes about his experiences growing up in the hood, about his homies getting robbed or getting killed. However, beyond the violence, there was a whole other aspect to the community that was left unaddressed. Years later, at a Christian conference, Lecrae felt the power of Christ for the first time, and became devoted to God. While there, he and his group went on a missionary expedition back to the hood to try and spread the word of the Lord. He then told the story of how a corner boy, moved by the words of their leader, broke down, pulled out a wad of hundreds and said, "Use this to do something right by God." That's the aspect of the trap that Lecrae is aiming to address. "Yeah, there may be a dope boy or two on the corner, but there's also a church on every other one," Lecrae writes. "The trap does more than say 'Aye.' It says 'Amen.'"

In an interview with Billboard, Lecrae explained the creative direction and the experience of working with Zaytoven by saying: "I've been a fan of Zay for many years. I just never imagined we'd be working together on an album. But we just had this chemistry from the jump. He actually works a lot like I do…It was a really easy process, actually. We would just trade ideas in the studio; he would tell me what he thought a track needed and I would catch a vibe right there and jump in the booth. Or sometimes I would record separately and show him when he came into the studio, and he'd be like 'wow!'"

== Promotion ==
On June 1, 2018, Lecrae released the album's lead single "Get Back Right". On June 15, 2018, the second single "Plugged In" was released.

== Critical reception ==
Professional ratings
Review scores
Source	Rating
AllMusic	3.5/5 stars
CCM Magazine	4.5/5 stars
HipHopDX	4/5 stars
Jesus Freak Hideout	3/5 stars 3.5/5 stars

Neil Z. Yeung of AllMusic rated the album 3.5 stars out of 5, commenting that Lecrae adds "spiritual heft to Zaytoven's trademark popping soundscapes." Aaron McKrell of HipHopDX gave the album 4 stars out of 5, calling the album "a work of poetic urgency over streetwise production." John Barber of CCM Magazine gave the album 4.5 stars out of 5, describing the album as "vintage lyrical Lecrae". Scott Fryberger of Jesus Freak Hideout gave the album 3 stars out of 5, criticizing the trap sound of the album by calling it "The same flows, the same robotic, auto-tuned vocals", and also noted its lyrical content and message by saying "he presents the Gospel in a way that's accessible but still tells the truth about the destructiveness of a sinful lifestyle". In a second Jesus Freak Hideout review by Kevin Hoskins, the album received more positive feedback with 3.5 stars out of 5. Hoskins called the album "a very purposed release" and praised Lecrae's efforts of taking on the challenge of reaching a new audience by saying "In that process, he may not captivate all of your standard CHH fans, but he is certainly going to gain some new listeners. While this is not my favorite Lecrae release, I certainly applaud his creativity and his effort to reach more people."

== Commercial performance ==
The album debuted at No. 49 on the Billboard 200 with first-week sales of 11,000 album-equivalent units.

== Track listing ==
No.	Title	Writer(s)	Length
1.	"Get Back Right"	Lecrae Moore; Bobby Pressley; Che "K-So" Olson; Xavier Dotson	3:05
2.	"Preach"	Maurice Simmonds; Dotson; Moore	2:55
3.	"2 Sides of the Game" (featuring K-So & Waka Flocka Flame)	Olson; Moore; Pressley; Dotson; Juaquin James Malphurs	3:13
4.	"Plugged In"	Pressley; Olson; Moore; Dotson	3:11
5.	"Holy Water"	Pressley; Olson; Moore; Dotson	3:26
6.	"Blue Strips"	Pressley; Olson; Moore; Dotson	4:01
7.	"Only God Can Judge Me"	Simmonds; Moore; Xavier Dotson	2:57
8.	"Yet"	Lloyd Musa; Moore; Dotson	3:12
9.	"I Can't Lose" (featuring 24hrs)	Robert Davis; Moore; Dotson	3:06
10.	"Switch" (featuring ShySpeaks)	Pressley; Olson; Moore; Dotson; Shawlesa Amos	4:02
11.	"Can't Block It"	Pressley; Olson; Moore; Dotson	2:58
12.	"Fly Away" (featuring nobigdyl.)	Pressley; Olson; Moore; Dotson; Dylan Phillips; Jeffery Lee Johnson Jr.	3:48
13.	"By Chance" (featuring Verse Simmonds)	Simmonds; Moore; Dotson	3:19

- The physical LifeWay exclusive version leaves out "Blue Strips" and features an alternate beat on "Yet".

== Charts ==
Chart (2018)	Peak position
New Zealand Heatseeker Albums (RMNZ)	10
US Billboard 200	49
US Top Christian Albums (Billboard)	1
US Independent Albums (Billboard)	3
US Top R&B/Hip-Hop Albums (Billboard)	26
