= Dwayne Tryumf =

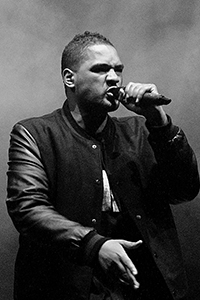

Background information
- Also known as: Conspiracy
- Born: Dwayne Shorter; London, England, UK
- Genres: Christian hip hop
- Occupations: Singer, songwriter
- Instrument: Vocals
- Years active: 1997–present
- Website: dwaynetryumf.com

Dwayne Shorter, who goes by the stage name Dwayne Tryumf, is a British Christian musician, who primarily plays Christian hip hop. He has released two studio albums, Ghetto Scripture in 2005 and 777: Mark of the Peace in 2010. Along with these, Tryumf released an extended play in 2006, The Mark of the Peace the EP, and a live album, Live in Concert in 2014.

== Early life ==
Dwayne Tryumf, was born as Dwayne Shorter, in London, England, where he was involved in secular hip hop during the mid-1990s. Tryumf became a Christian in August 1999, when he had intentions of quitting rapping altogether.

== Music career ==
He started his hip hop music career in 1997, with the group Magic Circle, using the name Conspiracy. Tryumf would start his Christian hip hop career in 1999, after his conversion to Christianity. His first studio album, Ghetto Scripture, was released in 2005. The subsequent release, an extended play, The Mark of the Peace the EP, was released on 30 April 2008. He released, 777: Mark of the Peace, a studio album, on 12 March 2010. The live album, Live in Concert, was released on 9 June 2014. He rapped some of his lyrics in Mandarin Chinese at a 2015 concert.

== Discography ==
Studio albums

- Ghetto Scripture (2005)
- 777: Mark of the Peace (12 March 2010)

live albums

- Live in Concert (9 June 2014)

EPs

- The Mark of the Peace the EP (30 April 2008)
