= WeDidIt =

- Website type: Crowd funding
- Available in: English
- Headquarters: Brooklyn, New York, United States
- Website: wedid.it
- Commercial: Yes
- Launched: 2012

WeDidIt is a New York City-based company founded in 2012, that provides an online platform and a mobile app for nonprofits to raise funds. It allows nonprofits to launch campaigns online, collect donations through their website, and collect funds and scan credit cards in person through the WeDidIt mobile app.

== History ==
WeDidIt was created by Su Sanni, Ben Lamson, and Bryan Liff. Initially, WeDidIt launched as an online platform for nonprofit crowdfunding, but expanded into creating software and mobile apps for nonprofit fundraising.

== Campaign types ==
WeDidIt has multiple campaign types on its platform:

- All-or-None Funding: similar to other crowdfunding platform. The campaign owner sets a funding goal and only receives the funds if the goal is met or exceeded.
- Open Funding: similar to the All-or-None funding campaign, however, their campaign owner receives the funds even if the goal is not reached.

WeDidIt charges a 5% fee of total funds raised and also charges a fee for Premium Services such as use of their mobile app or hosting campaigns on other websites.

== See also ==
- Civic crowdfunding
- Comparison of crowd funding services
