= I'll Find You =

2017 single by Lecrae featuring Tori Kelly

Single by Lecrae featuring Tori Kelly

from the album All Things Work Together
- Released: June 9, 2017
- Genre: Christian hip hop; Christian R&B
- Length: 3:38
- Label: Reach; Columbia
- Songwriters: Natalie Sims; Alexandra Yatchenko; Lecrae Moore; Danny Majic; John Mitchell; Victoria Kelly; Justin Franks
- Producers: Frank E; Danny Majic

Lecrae singles chronology
"Blessings" (2017)	"I'll Find You" (2017)	"Broke" (2017)

Tori Kelly singles chronology
"Hollow" (2015)	"I'll Find You" (2017)	"Take Back Home Girl" (2017)

Music video
- "I'll Find You" on YouTube

"I'll Find You" is a song by American rapper Lecrae featuring American singer and songwriter Tori Kelly. It was written by the artists alongside Natalie Sims, Sasha Sloan, John Mitchell, and producers DJ Frank E and Danny Majic. The song was released through Reach Records on June 9, 2017, as the third single from his eighth studio album All Things Work Together. The song is composed in the key of A-flat major and has a tempo of 135 beats per minute. The song was certified Platinum by the RIAA on February 26, 2020, after selling a million units. It was certified Gold by RMNZ on May 8, 2025.

== Background ==
In a statement announcing the new song, Lecrae explained the inspiration behind it, saying: "Life is a precious gift. A gift we often take for granted until it is threatened. Pain can be a haunting reminder to appreciate every waking moment. So we wrote a song to share our hope in the midst of that pain. At the time of this song's composition, some of our loved ones were battling cancer. We wanted to encourage them to hold on and tell them we are here waiting, hoping, praying, and fighting with them. Some have been released from their pain forever, others are still fighting. Hold on."

== Music video ==
The accompanying music video released on July 28, 2017 on Lecrae's official Vevo account. the video is in support of the St. Jude Children's Research Hospital, and was directed by Mike Mihail. It was shot at Glendale Memorial Hospital in Los Angeles and a studio in Memphis, and featured the two artists and St. Jude Children's Research Hospital patients. "For me, this video is my heartbeat. It's me showing my own pain, hope and passion for others. I want people to see there's hope in the chaos," Lecrae told People. The video has amassed over 120 million views as of May 2022, 93 million on the official video, and 13 million on the lyric video.

== Critical reception ==
Mark Braboy of Vibe described "I'll Find You" a "soul-stirring song". Tony Cummings of Cross Rhythms felt that the song "has one of the most powerful flows ever uttered by the renowned rapper".

== Credits and personnel ==
Credits adapted from Tidal.

- Lecrae – songwriting
- Tori Kelly – songwriting
- Natalie Sims – songwriting
- Sasha Sloan – songwriting
- Danny Majic – songwriting, production
- John "Johnny Yukon" Mitchell – songwriting
- DJ Frank E – songwriting, production
- Colin Leonard – mastering engineering
- Fernando Cuellar – assistant engineer
- Jason Romero – assistant engineer
- Zach Paradis – recording engineer
- Jacob Morris – recording engineer

== Charts ==
=== Weekly charts ===
Chart (2017)	Peak position
US Bubbling Under Hot 100 (Billboard)	15
US Hot Christian Songs (Billboard)	1
US Rhythmic Airplay (Billboard)	7

=== Year-end charts ===
Chart (2017)	position
US Christian Songs (Billboard)	3
US Rhythmic (Billboard)	45

Chart (2018)	Peak position
US Christian Songs (Billboard)	68

=== Decade-end charts ===
Chart (2010s)	Position
US Christian Songs (Billboard)	41

== Certifications ==
Region	Certification	Certified units/sales
United States (RIAA)	Platinum	1,000,000^{‡}
New Zealand (RMNZ)	Gold	15,000^{‡}
^{‡} Sales+streaming figures based on certification alone.
