= Blessings (Lecrae song) =

Single by Lecrae featuring Ty Dolla $ign

from the album All Things Work Together
- Released: January 27, 2017
- Genre: Christian hip hop; trap
- Length: 3:52
- Label: Reach; Columbia
- Songwriter(s): Lecrae Moore; Tyrone Williams Griffin, Jr.; Allen Swoope; Maurice Simmonds; Asheton Hogan
- Producer(s): PLUSS

Lecrae singles chronology
"Can't Stop Me Now (Destination)" (2016)	"Blessings" (2017)	"I'll Find You" (2017)

Ty Dolla Sign singles chronology
"I Think She Like Me" (2017)	"Blessings" (2017)	"Fallen" (2017)

"Blessings" is a song by American rapper Lecrae featuring American singer Ty Dolla $ign, released on January 27, 2017, as the second single from the former's eighth studio album All Things Work Together. The song is produced by PLUSS, an in-house producer for Mike WiLL Made-It's production company EarDrummers Entertainment. The song was released alongside a lyric video on January 27, 2017 before a music video on March 22. The song is written in C Major with a tempo of 140 BPM.

== Background ==
On January 27, 2017, Lecrae released "Blessings," the second single that the Reach Records frontman and founder released after signing with Columbia Records, which features a guest appearance from Los Angeles Native Ty Dolla $ign and production from PLUSS.

Although he is signed to his own label, Reach Records, Lecrae announced a joint deal with Columbia Records in early 2016 while he was in the middle of working on his eighth studio album. The collaboration with Ty Dolla $ign was something that had burgeoned out of a connection at SXSW back in 2011 while Lecrae was creating his mixtape, Church Clothes. In an interview with Victoria Hernandez from HipHopDX, Lecrae revealed that before the Columbia/Reach partnership was announced, Lecrae had already created "Blessings," but was at first hesitant with the title after Chance The Rapper released his Coloring Book mixtape. "We already had the song in the can... and then Chance's project came out and I was like, 'Dang...' We could have called it 'Count It Up,' or something like that, but I felt like it took away from that whole moment, so it was kinda like, man, it's all love."

With the feature from Ty Dolla $ign, and a chorus written by Verse Simmonds and Swoope, the production was something else that Lecrae believes fulfills the vision he has every time he creates music. "[Blessings] knocks. It's perfect for radio. If you never knew my music, it's [the] perfect... introduction 'cause... it's the balance of who I am. Everybody can enjoy it from a music standpoint, but it still has... meaning [and substance] to it, which matters to me."

Even though his debut project, Real Talk, dropped in 2004, Lecrae was performing as a "Who's Next?" artist for Power 106's event in Hollywood at the time when "Blessings" was released. However, Lecrae said he thinks nothing of it. "I think that's what keeps [me] moving is humility... Every day... every time I put out music, I look at myself as a new artist, because there's always a lane that you aren't known in or a place [you haven't been as a musician]... [For instance, on the radio] I am a new artist... [Most of my listeners] know me from the underground... but not radio."

== Music video ==
The official music video for "Blessings" was released on March 22, 2017.

The meaning behind this track is quite obvious: count your blessings big or small. He is encouraging listeners to be grateful for what they have and consider what really matters most in life. Food, shelter and quality time with family being chief among the blessings in his/our life. The music video for "Blessings" attempts to embody that message.

The video opens with a look at some family photos clearly communicating what the artist values most. As the action continues the viewer is treated to a heart warming depiction of a family gathering complete with good food and plenty of laughter. Multiple generations are present all enjoying ones company and celebrating life together. In an industry where high priced cars and scantily clad models take center stage Lecrae breaks the mold in the video. "Man it's a blessin' 'cause we ain't ever had a lot

But all we need is all we got."

The song has reached over 40.8 million views on YouTube as of November 28, 2022 (31.1 million from the official music video, and 9.7 million from the lyric video).

== Chart performance ==
Blessings reached number two on the Hot Christian Songs chart. It has also reached the Bubbling Under Hot 100 Singles chart at number 25.

== Charts ==
=== Weekly charts ===
Chart (2017)	Peak position
US Hot Christian Songs (Billboard)	2
US Bubbling Under Hot 100 (Billboard)	25
US R&B/Hip-Hop Airplay (Billboard)	18
US Rhythmic (Billboard)	34

=== Year-end charts ===
Chart (2017)	Peak position
US Christian Songs (Billboard)	9
US Mainstream R&B/Hip Hop Songs (Billboard)	41

== Certifications ==
Region	Certification	Certified units/sales
United States (RIAA)	Gold	500,000^{‡}
^{‡} Sales+streaming figures based on certification alone.
