= Round of Applause (Lecrae song) =

2013 single by Lecrae

Single by Lecrae

from the album Church Clothes, Vol. 2
- Released: May 14, 2013
- Genre: Christian hip hop; trap
- Length: 3:49
- Label: Reach Records
- Songwriters: L. Moore; K. Erondu
- Producer: K.E. on the Track

Lecrae singles chronology
"Tell the World" (2012)	"Round of Applause" (2013)	"I'm Turnt" (2013)

"Round of Applause (Remix)"

Remix by Lecrae featuring B.o.B

from the album Church Clothes 2
- Released: May 21, 2013
- Genre: Christian hip hop; trap
- Length: 4:54
- Label: Reach Records
- Songwriters: L. Moore; K. Erondu; B. R. Simmons Jr.
- Producer: K.E. on the Track

"Round of Applause" is a single by Christian hip hop artist Lecrae, released on May 14, 2013. The lead single from the commercial version of his mixtape Church Clothes 2, it was followed a week later by an extended, non-commercial version which featured B.o.B. Upon the release of the album's track-listing on November 2, which listed "Round of Applause" without B.o.B's feature, Reach Records producer Alex Medina tweeted that the commercial version of Church Clothes 2 does not contain the feature, while the free version hosted by Don Cannon does contain B.o.B's feature.

== Lyrics and style ==
Produced by K.E. on the Track, sonically the song features an "anthemic trap beat", a menacing synth line, and "street shaking, attention grabbing drums". Lyrically, the song congratulates college graduates and those who succeed in life despite the odds against them. Lecrae created a website page for the single, on which he expressed he was "Proud of all the graduates out there. Never overlook the unique opportunity you have in education. There are many paths you could have taken, obstacles to deter you, and things to distract you, but you beat the odds."

== Reception ==
The song for the most part met with a positive reception, with Danitha J of The Source calling the collaboration between Lecrae and B.o.B "epic" and praising Lecrae for his positive message. Writing for Jesus Freak Hideout, Kevin Hoskins thought "Lecrae and B.O.B. spit honest words laid over nice beats throughout the entire listen". Christian Music Zine considered the song a highlight from the album, and HipHopDX praising "Round of Applause", alongside the tracks "Misconception pt. 2" and "Was it Worth it", for offering topical and conceptual depth. On June 4, 2013, Lecrae performed the single live on BET's 106 & Park. On June 21, 2013, Pepsi included the extended version of the song in its list "Three Songs You Need to Hear Right Now", along with Justin Timberlake's "Don't Hold the Wall" and will.i.am's "Bang Bang". "Round of Applause" charted at No. 45 on the Christian Songs chart.

In contrast to this reception, Aubrey McKay of Wade-O Radio leveled criticism at the song, in particular the collaboration with B.o.B. McKay stated that in his opinion Lecrae and B.o.B "didn't mesh well together", and that "B.o.B.'s verse was sub-par".
