= Aha Gazelle =

American rapper

- Also known as: Aha Gazelle, Trilliam, Trill Will
- Born: William Gazelle Fields Jr. September 25, 1993 (age 32); New Orleans, Louisiana, U.S.
- Genres: Hip hop
- Occupations: Rapper; singer; songwriter
- Years active: 2010–present
- Label: Reach
- Website: itsahaman.com

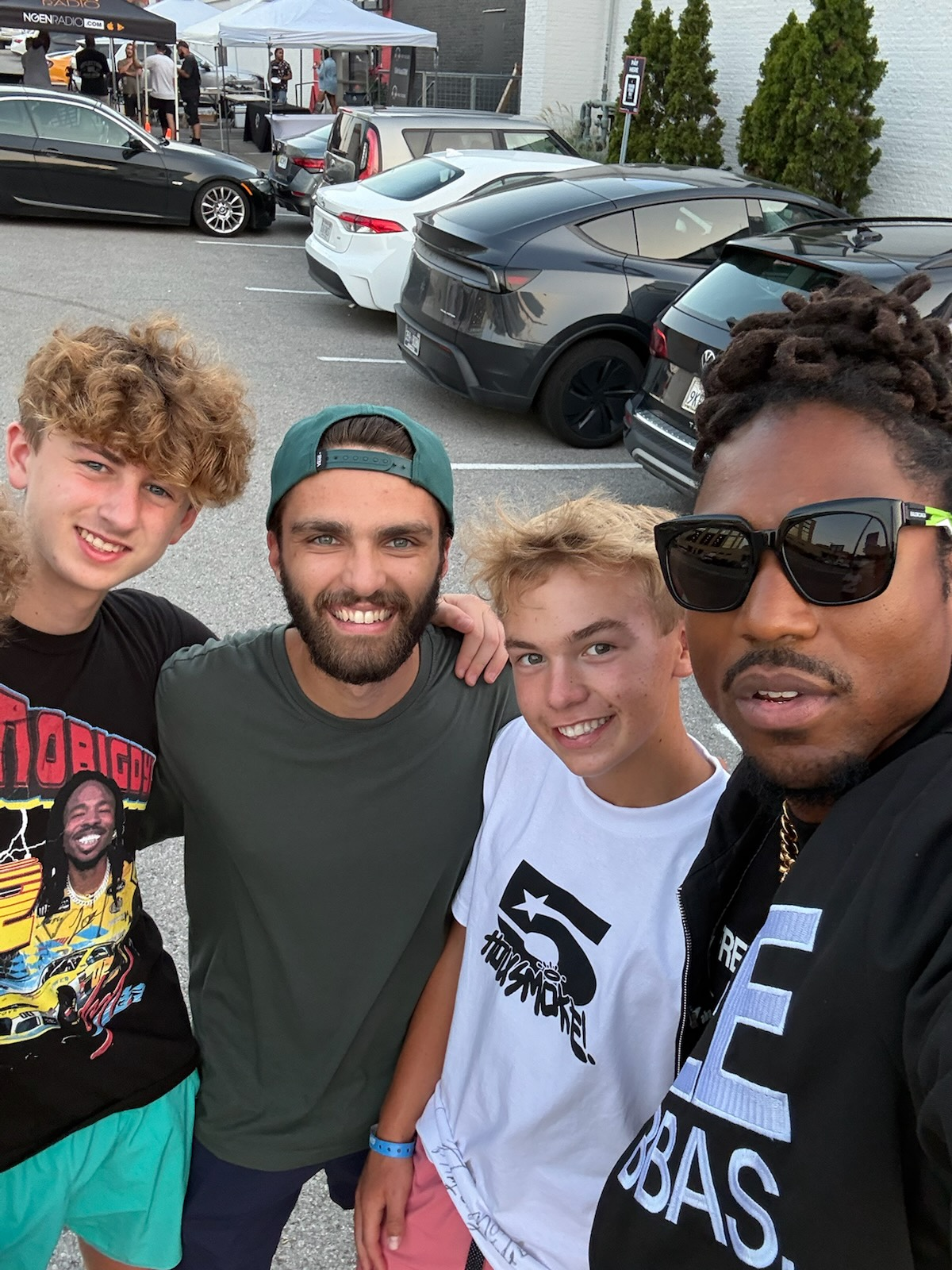
Aha Gazelle (right) poses with fans at Holy Smoke! 2025. Nashville, TN.

William Gazelle Fields Jr. (born September 25, 1993), professionally known as Aha Gazelle, is an American rapper from New Orleans, Louisiana. In 2012, he had a project released called #TeamGMG. In 2014, Aha released his first official mixtape, Greenbeans & Tuna, which was received well locally and online via mediums such as Spinrilla and Mymixtapez. He received further recognition for "Vegeta", his most successful record as of 2017. Trilliam 2 was released June 9, 2017 as his debut for Reach Records.

== Biography ==
At an early age, Aha showed an interest in music, playing trombone in middle school, and playing the drums by the age of 13 at his father's church. Aha began experimenting with music production at 15 years old. By 16, he released his first self-produced mixtape under the name Trill Will. At 17, Aha became fascinated with the piano and taught himself how to play by ear, releasing #TeamGMG the following year. He transitioned from the drums to keyboards and began playing at other churches in his native New Orleans.

He attended Grambling State University where he graduated with a bachelor's degree in business management in 2014. He gained further recognition upon releasing Free Barabbas in 2015, which featured the singles "Gettin' Money" and "Vegeta", the latter of which proved to be his most successful single. Aha was signed to Reach Records in 2017 by Lecrae, who had been closely watching the artist. In 2018, Aha announced that he was leaving Reach Records to pursue other ventures. Since leaving Reach Records, Aha has released several singles and, in 2020, released a new album, 180.

== Artistry ==
Most of Aha's projects are self-produced. Aha plays piano and drums, and is also a vocalist (although he has admitted that he uses Auto-Tune). In an interview with HipHopDX, Aha revealed that his musical influences include Master P, Lil Wayne, Kevin Gates, Boosie Badazz, Frank Ocean and PJ Morton.

== Discography ==
- #TeamGMG (2012)
- Greenbeans and Tuna (2013)
- Beemo & I (2014)
- Beemo & I 2 (2015)
- Free Barabbas (2015)
- Trilliam (2016)
- Trilliam 2 (June 2017)
- Trilliam 3 (November 2017)
- September Season Pack, Vol. 1 (September 2019)
- 180 (January 2020)
- Secession (collaboration with Starringo) (July 2020)
- 180 (Chopped NOT Slopped) (October 2020)
- Wah Wah (two singles) (January 2021)
- Table or Bouff (two singles) (March 2021)
- Pardon Me (May 2021)
- Spin (August 2021)
- September Season Pack, Vol. 2 (two singles) (September 2021)
- September Season Pack, Vol. 3 (three singles) (September 2023)
