= Restoration (Lecrae album) =

Studio album by Lecrae
- Released: August 21, 2020
- Genre: Christian hip hop
- Label: Reach Records
- Producer: 30 Roc; 30WON; 42 North; Ace Harris; Alex Medina; Anthem; Anthony Gardner; Carvello; Dave James; DJ Frank E; Danny Majic; Dave James; Epikh Pro; GAWVI; Inc. No World; Kelvin Wooten; Kheilstone; Mike Woods; MrWriteNow; NOVA WAV; Oshi; Quay Global; Ray Castro; SAK PASE; S1; Taylor Hill

Lecrae chronology
Let the Trap Say Amen (2018)	Restoration (2020)	No Church In a While (2021)

Singles from Restoration
- 1. "Set Me Free" Released: March 20, 2020; 2. "Deep End" Released: June 24, 2020; 3. "Drown" Released: July 17, 2020; 4. "Zombie" Released: August 7, 2020

Restoration is the ninth solo studio album by American Christian hip hop artist Lecrae, released on August 21, 2020, through Reach Records. The album features appearances from YK Osiris, Marc E. Bassy, John Legend, Jozzy, Kirk Franklin, DaniLeigh, BJ the Chicago Kid and Gwen Bunn. A deluxe edition of the album, with six additional tracks, was released on November 13, 2020, which included additional guest appearances from Rapsody, Ty Brasel, as well as labelmates Andy Mineo, Hulvey, WHATUPRG, Wande and 1K Phew. The album peaked at No. 1 on the US Christian Albums chart and No. 5 on the UK Christian & Gospel Albums chart. It received universal critical acclaim. It also received a Best Contemporary Christian Music Performance/Song nomination at the 63rd Annual Grammy Awards for the song "Sunday Morning".

== Background ==
Lecrae announced the album along with a new upcoming book, I Am Restored: How I Lost My Religion but Found My Faith, in February 2020. Lecrae subsequently left Columbia Records and returned to being a fully independent artist.

During the several years prior to the album's release, Lecrae had struggled with clinical depression, anxiety, suicidal thoughts, and marital problems, and considered abandoning Christianity. He attributes much of this to trauma he encountered in his childhood, trauma which resurfaced when he started facing relentless criticism from many Christians. After a trip to Israel with a group of Christian hip hop artists, including labelmate Andy Mineo as well as FLAME, Derek Minor, Canon, and Spechouse, which included the group being baptized in the Jordan River, Lecrae was restored in his faith. He also went to therapy and repaired his relationship with his wife.

== Promotion ==
On March 20, 2020, Lecrae released the album's lead single "Set Me Free" featuring YK Osiris. On June 24, 2020, the second single "Deep End" was released. On July 17, 2020, the third single "Drown" featuring John Legend was released.

== Conceptual theme ==
Lecrae has stated that the theme of the album is about mending what is broken, both as an individual and in society, and finding holistic restoration and healing, particularly from God. He told Forbes that "I think a lot of times we're looking for where that restoration can come from and we're missing the reality that we have the God-given ingenuity and the light in us to do the work that we want to see done in society and in the world. I believe that's possible. I've sat in therapist chairs. I've done meditation. I believe holistically we can be restored, regardless of our circumstances. That's the heartbeat of the album." In an interview with The Christian Post, he said that "God is more perfect than I am and there's nothing we can do to make Him love us more or less. There's no situation that we're in that He's not wanting to help us through."

== Critical reception ==
Professional ratings
Review scores
Source	Rating
AllMusic	4.5/5 stars
American Songwriter	4.5/5 stars
Jesus Freak Hideout	4/5 stars

Neil Z. Yeung from AllMusic rated the album four-and-a-half stars out of five and considered it the best album of Lecrae's career. Scott Fryberger of Jesus Freak Hideout gave the album 4 stars out of 5, praising the theme, sound and lyrics of the album. He also praised Lecrae for his vulnerability on the album by saying "Lecrae's journey through hell and back is inspirational and relatable, and the music it's paired with is some of his best work in years". Tess Schoonhoven of American Songwriter rated the album 4.5 out of 5. They were of the opinion that the feature credits on Restoration rendered it more multi-dimensional than 2018's Let the Trap Say Amen, and remarked that it "sheds a surprising and approachable light into the niche genre [of Christian hip hop]".

== Track listing ==
No.	Title	Writer(s)	Producer(s)	Length
1.	"Restore Me"	Lecrae Moore; Ray Castro; Lasanna "Ace" Harris; Alex Medina; Dave James; Taylor Hill	Ray Castro; Ace Harris; Alex Medina; Dave James; Taylor Hill	1:17
2.	"Set Me Free" (featuring YK Osiris)	Erica Campbell; Gabriel Azucena; Christopher Michael Hulvey; Torey D'Shaun; Trecina Atkins-Campbell; Warryn Campbell; J. Raul Garcia; Osiris Williams; Moore	GAWVI	2:58
3.	"Wheels Up" (featuring Marc E. Bassy)	Larry Griffin; Moore; Stuart Lowery; Kelvin Wooten; Marc Griffin; Abe Parker	Inc. No World; Epikh Pro; Kelvin Wooten; S1	4:04
4.	"Over the Top"	Tray Haggerty; D'Shaun; Moore; Christopher Michael Hulvey; Samuel Gloade	30 Roc	3:12
5.	"Self Discovery"	Wooten; Olson; Moore; Gloade; Morris W. Ricks II	Kelvin Wooten; S1	2:28
6.	"Deep End"	Britanny Fousheé; John Summit; Moore; Khari Alamin	Anthony Gardner	2:41
7.	"Drown" (featuring John Legend)	Jim Lavigne; Moore; Micah Premnath; Alex Stacey; Daniel Majic; Justin Franks; Ace Harris; John Stephens	Danny Majic; DJ Frank E; Ace Harris	3:21
8.	"Saturday Night" (featuring Jozzy)	Ricks II; Moore; Joshua Brennan; Jocelyn Donald	Oshi	2:08
9.	"Sunday Morning" (featuring Kirk Franklin)	Kirk Franklin; Moore; Lynwood Norris; Denisia Andrews; Nathanael Saint-Fleur; Terrence Antonio Jones; Harris; Lowery; Shama Joseph; Kuwanna J. Moore; Brittany Coney	Anthem; Ace Harris; Epikh Pro; SAK PASE	4:02
10.	"Zombie"	Tommie Walker; Fred Hammond; Moore; Lowery; Hill	Epikh Pro; Taylor Hill	2:32
11.	"Keep Going"	Harris; PA Carvello; Christopher N'Quay; Fletcher Redd; Moore	Quay Global; Carvello; Ace Harris	2:28
12.	"Still" (featuring DaniLeigh)	Brittany Coney; Mike Woods; Moore; Denisia Andrews; Danielle Leigh Curiel	NOVA WAV; Mike Woods	2:56
13.	"Only Human" (featuring BJ the Chicago Kid)	Kenneth Deron Anderson; Harris; Tyler Alan Brasel; Dave James; John McNeil; John Smythe; Bryan James Sledge; Moore	30WON; Dave James; Ace Harris; 42 North	3:49
14.	"Nothing Left to Hide" (featuring Gwen Bunn)	Gwen Bunn; L. Griffin; Moore	Ace Harris; Inc. No World; S1	3:37

The Deluxe Album
No.	Title	Writer(s)	Producer(s)	Length
15.	"10 Toes"	Kyrie Briana Chalmers; Harris; Moore; Ryan Bert; Haggerty	Carvello; Ace Harris	3:09
16.	"Rich and Famous" (featuring WHATUPURG & Ty Brasel)	Dave James; JRaul Garcia; Kheil "Stone" Harrison; Harris; Moore; Bert; Joseph; Lowery; D'Shaun; Brasel; Zach Paradis	Epikh Pro; Kheilstone; Ace Harris; SAK PASE	3:26
17.	"Come Thru Jesus"	Moore; Lelon Windham; Bert; Joseph	Carvello; SAK PASE	2:09
18.	"Deep End (Remix)" (featuring Rapsody)	Anthony MrWriteNow Gardner; Moore; Marlanna Evans	MrWriteNow	2:39
19.	"Restored" (featuring 1K Phew, Wande, Hulvey)	Brianna Curiel; Hulvey; Glenn Isaac Gordon II; Harris; Moore; Bert; Hill; Wande Isola	Carvello; Ace Harris; Taylor Hill	4:37
20.	"Celebrate More" (116 featuring Lecrae, Andy Mineo & Hulvey)	Andy Mineo; Hulvey; David James Miller; Lavigne; Wooten; L. Griffin; Latravian Haggerty; Moore; Lowery; Hill	Dave James; Epikh Pro; Inc. No World; Kelvin Wooten; S1; Taylor Hill	3:11
Total length:				1:00:37

Sample credits

- "Set Me Free" contains a sample from "Shackles (Praise You)" performed by Mary Mary and interpolations from "Same Old Story" written and performed by TQ Dat Mayne featuring B.B. King
- "Deep End" contains a sample from "Deep End" performed by John Summit and interpolations from "Deep End Freestyle" written and performed by Sleepy Hallow and Fousheé
- "Zombie" contains a sample from "We're Blessed" performed by Fred Hammond & Radical for Christ and interpolations from "I'm 'n Luv (wit a Stripper)" written and performed by T-Pain featuring Mike Jones
- "Keep Going" contains interpolations from "Celebrate More" written and performed by 116, Andy Mineo & Hulvey featuring Lecrae

== Charts ==
Chart performance for Restoration
Chart (2020)	Peak position
UK Christian & Gospel Albums (OCC)	5
US Billboard 200	69
US Christian Albums (Billboard)	1
US Independent Albums (Billboard)	13
US Top R&B/Hip-Hop Albums (Billboard)	39
