= Church Clothes 2 =

Church Clothes, Vol. 2

Mixtape by Lecrae
- Released: November 7, 2013
- Recorded: 2012–13
- Genre: Christian hip hop
- Length: 52:12
- Labels: Reach; DatPiff.com
- Producers: 5PMG; 808&Elite; Boi-1da; Christian Navarro; David Banner; Dirty Rice; DJ Burn One; DJ Official; Dunlap; Hector Delgado; Jon Jon Traxx; Justin Kahler; Mike DZL; K.E. on the Track; Street Symphony (also exec.); ThaInnaCircle; The Bridge (DJ Efechto and D. Steele); Tone Jonez; Tyshane; VJ Greenfield

Lecrae chronology
Gravity (2012)	Church Clothes, Vol. 2 (2013)	Anomaly (2014)

Singles from Church Clothes, Vol. 2
- 1. "Round of Applause" Released: May 14, 2013; 2. "I'm Turnt" Released: October 18, 2013

Church Clothes 2, officially Church Clothes, Vol. 2, is the second mixtape by Christian hip hop artist Lecrae, released on November 7, 2013 by Reach Records. Hosted by Don Cannon, it follows Lecrae's previous mixtape, Church Clothes, and Grammy Award-winning full-length album Gravity, both of which came out in 2012. Two versions of the album were released, a free version with host Don Cannon, and a commercial version off iTunes without the DJ. The first single off the album, "Round of Applause", was released on May 14, 2013. On May 21, a remixed version of the song, featuring rapper B.o.B, was released. A second single off the album, "I'm Turnt", dropped on October 18, 2013. The mixtape was downloaded over 100,000 times on DatPiff.com in the first two weeks and debuted at No. 21 on the Billboard 200 chart, No. 1 on the Top Christian and Gospel charts, and No. 3 on the Top Rap chart.

== Background ==
Church Clothes 2 is the second of Lecrae's mixtape and a sequel to the tape he released the previous year, Church Clothes, which also saw Don Cannon as the host. The tape was downloaded 100,000 times off Datpiff.com in only 48 hours, and was hailed as possibly "the most important Christian hip hop album in history." However, the mixtape also generated controversy in Christian circles due to Lecrae's collaboration with the "secular" producer Don Cannon, concerns of him "selling-out" to a mainstream audience, and perceptions that Lecrae took a harsh view of the church in the mixtape's single, "Church Clothes". Following the success of Church Clothes, on September 4, 2012, Lecrae released his sixth studio album, Gravity, which debuted at No. 3 on the Billboard 200 with 72,000 units sold. This album also was hailed as the most important in Christian hip-hop album in history, and garnered a Grammy Award in the Gospel at the 2013 Grammy Awards, the first time a Christian hip hop artist ever won a Grammy.

== Promotion and marketing ==
On May 14, 2013, Lecrae released the mixtape's lead single, "Round of Applause", an anthem congratulating college graduates. The next week, a second version of the single was released, this time with a feature from B.o.B. This version captured media attention, and on June 21, 2013, Pepsi included it in its list "Three Songs You Need to Hear Right Now", along with Justin Timberlake's "Don't Hold the Wall" and will.i.am's "Bang Bang". A second single for the album, "I'm Turnt", was released on October 18, 2013. Upon the release of the album's track-listing on November 2, which listed "Round of Applause" without B.o.B.'s feature, Reach Records producer Alex Medina tweeted that the commercial version of the album does not contain the feature, while the free version with Don Cannon does contain B.o.B.'s feature. Lecrae says he released the album for free because he wanted to allow people hear good music without sapping their wallets.

== Reception ==
=== Commercial ===
Church Clothes 2 debuted at No. 21 spot on the Billboard 200, No. 1 on the Billboard Christian Albums and Gospel Albums charts, and No. 3 on the Rap Albums chart. On Datpiff.com, the album has over 146,000 downloads as of November 26, 2013.

=== Critical ===
Professional ratings
Review scores
Source	Rating
Allmusic	3.5/5 stars
BET	4/5 stars
CCM Magazine	4/5 stars
Christian Music Zine	5/5
Jesus Freak Hideout	4/5 stars
Jesus Wired	4.5/5

Church Clothes 2 was very well received by critics, who praised the mixtape for its lyricism, versatility, and production quality. Jake Rohn of BET rated the album four out of five stars, stating that "Though songs like "Misconception Pt. 2" and "The Fever" served as little more than bland filler, Church Clothes 2 is a solid effort in when-keeping-it-real-goes-holy. Lecrae is lyrically dope and versatile with the tracks, and he can go toe-to-toe with any emcee, classified "Christian rap" or not." Anthony Peronto of Christian Music Zine gave the album a perfect score, stating that it with its versatility and quality it "feels more like a full length album rather than the straightforward mixtape sound that "Vol. 1 offered and is better off for it." Allmusic's Andy Kellman rated the mixtape three-point-five out of five stars, noting that Church Clothes 2 "is packed with collaborations from the Christian and secular hip-hop worlds, while Lecrae, a leader in his genre, delivers typically authoritative rhymes regarding a wide spectrum of issues." Kevin Hoskins of Jesus Freak Hideout rated the album four out of five stars and summarized that "Overall, I tend to think that DJ Cannon drops his own name way too much and not every single track is great, but it's otherwise quality rap, it's free, and Lecrae is speaking what's on his heart." At CCM Magazine, Andy Argyrakis rated the album four out of five stars and called the album a "home run", noting how it contained "cutting edge production, acrobatic rhymes, and socially relevant lyrics" which offered "plenty of substance throughout these Top 40-friendly sounds. Christopher Johnson of Jesus Wired rated the album a four-and-a-half out of five, saying that Lecrae continues "to explore multiple styles of delivery for his thought provoking messages."

== Track listing ==
Free version
No.	Title	Producer(s)	Length
1.	"Co-Sign Pt. 2"	Christian Navarro; Street Symphony	2:14
2.	"Believe"	VJ Greenfield; Street Symphony	2:24
3.	"Devil in Disguise" (featuring Kevin Ross)	DJ Official	4:12
4.	"The Fever" (featuring Andy Mineo and Papa San)	Tyshane	3:59
5.	"I'm Turnt"	K.E. on the Track	2:26
6.	"Let it Whip" (featuring Paul Wall)	David Banner; Hector Delgado	3:58
7.	"Sell Out"	Dirty Rice; Street Symphony	2:19
8.	"Lost My Way" (featuring King Mez and Daniel Day)	Boi-1da; Mike DZL	3:19
9.	"Misconception Pt 2" (featuring W.L.A.K.)	Jon Jon Traxx	4:33
10.	"Round of Applause" (featuring B.o.B)	K.E. on the Track	4:52
11.	"Was it Worth it" (featuring Derek Minor and Crystal Nicole)	Dirty Rice	3:31
12.	"Bun B speaks" (phone message by Bun B)		0:32
13.	"Finer Things" (featuring Tedashii)	DJ Burn One; 5PMG	3:21
14.	"Hands Up" (featuring Propaganda)	The Bridge (DJ Efechto and D. Steele)	3:02
15.	"My Whole Life Changed"	ThaInnaCircle; Street Symphony	3:49
16.	"If I Die Tonight" (featuring Novel)	Justin Kahler	3:37
17.	"Hang On"	Tone Jonez; Dirty Rice; Street Symphony	3:04
Total length:			52:12

Commercial version
No.	Title	Producer(s)	Length
1.	"Co-Sign Pt. 2"	808&Elite; Street Symphony	2:16
2.	"Believe"	Dunlap; Street Symphony	2:12
3.	"Devil in Disguise" (featuring Kevin Ross)	DJ Official	4:16
4.	"The Fever" (featuring Andy Mineo and Papa San)	Tyshane	4:06
5.	"I'm Turnt"	K.E. on the Track	2:28
6.	"Let it Whip" (featuring Paul Wall)	David Banner; Hector Delgado	3:59
7.	"Sell Out"	Dirty Rice; Street Symphony	2:19
8.	"Lost My Way" (featuring King Mez and Daniel Day)	Boi-1da; Mike DZL	3:22
9.	"Misconception Pt 2" (featuring W.L.A.K.)	Jon Jon Traxx	4:36
10.	"Round of Applause"	K.E. on the Track	3:49
11.	"Was it Worth it" (featuring Derek Minor and Crystal Nicole)	Dirty Rice	3:55
12.	"Bun B speaks" (phone message by Bun B)		0:34
13.	"Finer Things" (featuring Tedashii)	DJ Burn One; 5PMG	3:26
14.	"Hands Up" (featuring Propaganda)	The Bridge (DJ Efechto and D. Steele)	3:06
15.	"My Whole Life Changed"	ThaInnaCircle; Street Symphony	3:51
16.	"If I Die Tonight" (featuring Novel)	Justin Kahler	3:40
17.	"Hang On"	Tone Jonez; Dirty Rice; Street Symphony	3:09
Total length:			55:04

- Does not feature host Don Cannon or B.o.B.

== Chart history ==
Chart	Peak position
UK Christian & Gospel Albums (OCC)	15
Billboard 200	21
US Christian	1
US Gospel	1
US Rap	3
