= Zayn Malik discography =

Pop recording artist discography

Zayn discography
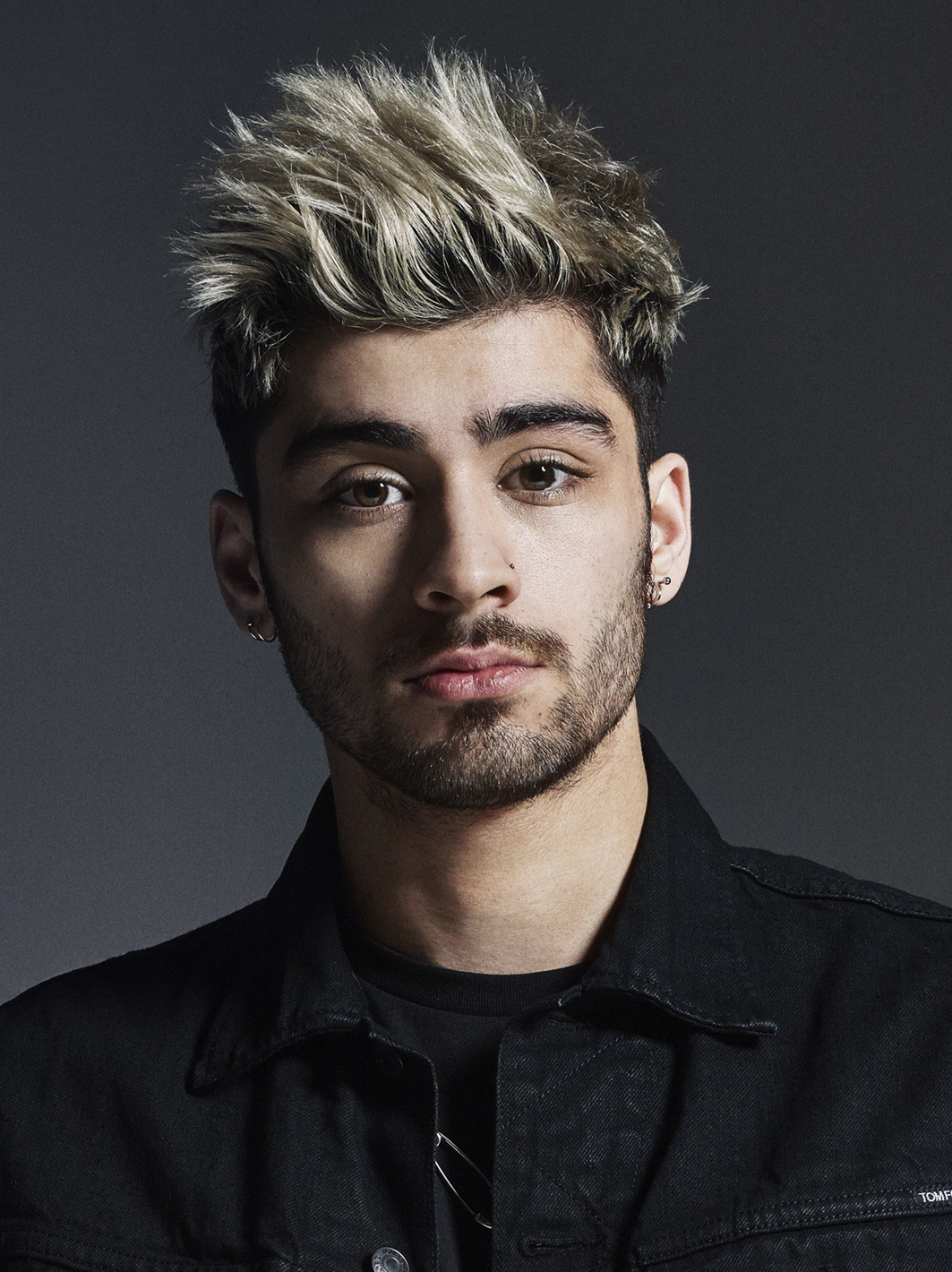
- Zayn in 2015
- Studio albums: 5
- Singles: 27
- Music videos: 21
- Promotional singles: 7
- Mixtapes: 1

As a solo artist, English singer Zayn has released five studio albums, one mixtape, twenty-seven singles (including five as a featured artist), seven promotional singles, and twenty-two music videos.

After leaving the pop boy band One Direction in 2015, Malik signed a solo recording contract with RCA Records that year. He released his debut studio album, Mind of Mine, on 25 March 2016, in which the album and its lead single, "Pillowtalk" (his debut single), reached number one in several countries, with Zayn becoming the first British male artist to debut at number one in both the UK and US with a debut single and debut studio album.

Zayn released his second studio album, Icarus Falls, on 14 December 2018. After a year of releasing a few collaborations, he released his third studio album, Nobody Is Listening, on 15 January 2021. Zayn left RCA Records in mid-2021 due to creative differences and then signed to Mercury and Republic Records in mid-2023. Zayn released a non-album single "Love Like This" on 21 July 2023. His fourth studio album, Room Under the Stairs was released on 17 May 2024.

Malik announced his fifth studio album, Konnakol, on 4 February 2026. The album was released on 17 April 2026, with lead single "Die for Me" released on 6 February 2026.

== Studio albums ==
Title	Details	Peak chart positions										Sales	Certifications
Title	Details	UK	AUS	CAN	DEN	FRA	IRE	ITA	NZ	SWE	US	Sales	Certifications
Mind of Mine	Released: 25 March 2016; Label: RCA; Format: CD, LP, digital download, streaming	1	1	1	9	3	2	1	1	1	1	UK: 103,000; CAN: 11,000; US: 112,000	BPI: Gold; FIMI: Platinum; IFPI DEN: Gold; MC: Platinum; RIAA: Platinum
Icarus Falls	Released: 14 December 2018; Label: RCA; Format: CD, LP, digital download, streaming	77	60	24	26	101	97	65	—	30	61	CAN: 40,000; US: 17,000	BPI: Silver; MC: Gold; RIAA: Gold
Nobody Is Listening	Released: 15 January 2021; Label: RCA; Format: CD, digital download, streaming	17	10	21	—	108	32	8	31	20	44	US: 15,000	
Room Under the Stairs	Released: 17 May 2024; Label: Mercury, Republic; Format: CD, LP, digital download, streaming, cassette	3	16	—	—	29	26	38	38	—	15	US: 29,000	
Konnakol	Released: 17 April 2026; Label: Mercury; Format: CD, LP, digital download, streaming	4	15	—	—	61	38	47	19	—	18		
"—" denotes a recording that did not chart or was not released in that territory.

== Mixtapes ==
List of mixtapes, with selected details
Title	Details
Yellow Tape	Released: 13 September 2021; Label: Self-released; Format: Digital download

== Singles ==
=== As lead artist ===
Title	Year	Peak chart positions										Certifications	Album
Title	Year	UK	AUS	CAN	DEN	FRA	IRE	ITA	NZ	SWE	US	Certifications	Album
"Pillowtalk"	2016	1	1	1	5	4	1	3	1	1	1	BPI: 3× Platinum; ARIA: 4× Platinum; FIMI: 2× Platinum; GLF: 3× Platinum; IFPI DEN: Platinum; MC: 4× Platinum; RIAA: 5× Platinum; RMNZ: 4× Platinum; SNEP: Platinum	Mind of Mine
"Like I Would"	2016	30	—	23	—	117	32	57	38	39	55	BPI: Silver; FIMI: Gold; GLF: Gold; MC: Platinum; RIAA: Gold; RMNZ: Gold	Mind of Mine
"Wrong" (featuring Kehlani)	2016	118	—	96	—	—	—	—	—	—	— (Note: "Wrong" did not enter the Billboard Hot 100, but peaked at number 13 on the Bubbling Under Hot 100 Singles chart.)		Mind of Mine
"I Don't Wanna Live Forever" (with Taylor Swift)	2016	5	3	2	2	4	4	5	4	1	2	BPI: 2× Platinum; ARIA: 7× Platinum; FIMI: 3× Platinum; GLF: Platinum; IFPI DEN: Platinum; MC: 2× Platinum; RIAA: 4× Platinum; RMNZ: 4× Platinum; SNEP: Diamond	Fifty Shades Darker: Original Motion Picture Soundtrack
"Still Got Time" (featuring PartyNextDoor)	2017	24	—	22	—	36	30	70	32	39	66	BPI: Gold; MC: Platinum; RIAA: Gold; RMNZ: Platinum	Icarus Falls (Note: "Still Got Time" and "Dusk Till Dawn" are included on the 2020 digital version and the Japanese edition of Icarus Falls.)
"Dusk Till Dawn" (featuring Sia)	2017	5	6	5	2	2	4	6	8	2	44	BPI: 3× Platinum; ARIA: 4× Platinum; FIMI: 3× Platinum; GLF: 5× Platinum; IFPI DEN: 2× Platinum; MC: 2× Platinum; RIAA: 2× Platinum; RMNZ: 5× Platinum; SNEP: Diamond	Icarus Falls
"Let Me"	2018	20	—	33	26	74	42	82	32	34	73	BPI: Silver; RIAA: Gold; RMNZ: Platinum	Icarus Falls
"Entertainer"	2018	95	—	—	—	—	—	—	— (Note: "Entertainer" did not enter the NZ Top 40 Singles Chart, but peaked at number six on the NZ Heatseeker Singles Chart.)	—	—		Icarus Falls
"Sour Diesel"	2018	—	—	—	—	—	—	—	— (Note: "Sour Diesel" did not enter the NZ Top 40 Singles Chart, but peaked at number 26 on the NZ Hot Singles Chart.)	—	—		Icarus Falls
"Too Much" (featuring Timbaland)	2018	79	—	—	—	—	89	—	— (Note: "Too Much" did not enter the NZ Top 40 Singles Chart, but peaked at number 12 on the NZ Hot Singles Chart.)	— (Note: "Too Much" did not enter the Swedish Singellista Chart, but peaked at number 17 on the Swedish Heatseeker Chart.)	—		Icarus Falls
"Fingers"	2018	—	—	—	—	—	—	—	— (Note: "Fingers" did not enter the NZ Top 40 Singles Chart, but peaked at number 32 on the NZ Hot Singles Chart.)	—	—		Icarus Falls
"No Candle No Light" (featuring Nicki Minaj)	2018	—	—	—	—	—	—	—	— (Note: "No Candle No Light" did not enter the NZ Top 40 Singles Chart, but peaked at number six on the NZ Hot Singles Chart.)	— (Note: "No Candle No Light" did not enter the Swedish Singellista Chart, but peaked at number four on the Swedish Heatseeker Chart.)	— (Note: "No Candle No Light" did not enter Billboard Hot 100, but peaked at number 49 on the Billboard Digital Song Sales Chart.)		Icarus Falls
"Trampoline" (Remix) (with Shaed)	2019	—	—	—	—	—	—	—	9	64	—	GLF: Gold; IFPI DEN: Gold; RMNZ: 4× Platinum	Melt (Deluxe) and High Dive
"Flames" (with R3hab and Jungleboi)	2019	—	—	—	—	124	—	—	— (Note: "Flames" did not enter the NZ Top 40 Singles Chart, but peaked at number 22 on the NZ Hot Singles Chart.)	— (Note: "Flames" did not enter the Swedish Singellista Chart, but peaked at number seven on the Swedish Heatseeker Chart.)	—		Non-album single
"Better"	2020	58	—	59	—	—	56	—	— (Note: "Better" did not enter the NZ Top 40 Singles Chart, but peaked at number five on the NZ Hot Singles Chart.)	51	89		Nobody Is Listening
"Vibez"	2021	50	—	83	—	—	31	—	— (Note: "Vibez" did not enter the NZ Top 40 Singles Chart, but peaked at number nine on the NZ Hot Singles Chart.)	— (Note: "Vibez" did not enter the Swedish Singellista Chart, but peaked at number six on the Swedish Heatseeker Chart.)	— (Note: "Vibes" did not enter the Billboard Hot 100, but peaked at number 20 on the Bubbling Under Hot 100 Singles chart.)		Nobody Is Listening
"To Begin Again" (with Ingrid Michaelson)	2021	—	—	—	—	—	—	—	—	—	—		Non-album singles
"Angel" (with Jimi Hendrix)	2022	—	—	—	—	—	—	—	—	—	—		Non-album singles
"Love Like This"	2023	36	—	71	—	—	57	—	— (Note: "Love Like This" did not enter the NZ Top 40 Singles Chart, but peaked at number 10 on the NZ Hot Singles Chart.)	59	— (Note: "Love Like This" did not enter the Billboard Hot 100, but peaked at number 12 on the Bubbling Under Hot 100 Singles chart.)		Non-album singles
"What I Am"	2024	89	—	—	—	—	—	—	— (Note: "What I Am" did not enter the NZ Top 40 Singles Chart, but peaked at number six on the NZ Hot Singles Chart.)	—	—		Room Under the Stairs
"Alienated"	2024	— (Note: "Alienated" did not enter the UK Singles Chart, but peaked at number 57 on the UK Singles Downloads Chart.)	—	—	—	—	—	—	— (Note: "Alienated" did not enter the NZ Top 40 Singles Chart, but peaked at number 26 on the NZ Hot Singles Chart.)	—	—		Room Under the Stairs
"Stardust"	2024	— (Note: "Stardust" did not enter the UK Singles Chart, but peaked at number one on the UK Asian Music Chart.)	—	—	—	—	—	—	— (Note: "Stardust" did not enter the NZ Top 40 Singles Chart, but peaked at number 15 on the NZ Hot Singles Chart.)	—	—		Room Under the Stairs
"Eyes Closed" (with Jisoo)	2025	37	—	39	—	—	67	—	— (Note: "Eyes Closed" did not enter the NZ Top 40 Singles Chart, but peaked at number 1 on the NZ Hot Singles Chart.)	—	72		Non-album single
"Die for Me"	2026	91	—	—	—	—	—	—	— (Note: "Die for Me" did not enter the NZ Top 40 Singles Chart, but peaked at number 17 on the NZ Hot Singles Chart.)	—	—		Konnakol
"Sideways"	2026	—	—	—	—	—	—	—	— (Note: "Sideways" did not enter the NZ Top 40 Singles Chart, but peaked at number 30 on the NZ Hot Singles Chart.)	—	—		Konnakol
"—" denotes a recording that did not chart or was not released in that territory.

=== As featured artist ===
Title	Year	Peak chart positions						Certifications	Album
Title	Year	UK	FRA	IRE	NZ	POR	SWE	Certifications	Album
"Back to Sleep" (Remix) (Chris Brown featuring Usher and Zayn)	2016	—	—	—	—	—	—		Non-album singles
"Cruel" (Snakehips featuring Zayn)	2016	33	147	55	32	89	89	BPI: Silver; RMNZ: Platinum	Non-album singles
"Freedun" (M.I.A. featuring Zayn)	2016	—	—	—	—	—	—		AIM
"Rumors" (Sabrina Claudio featuring Zayn)	2019	—	—	—	—	—	—		Truth Is
"Tu Hai Kahan" (AUR featuring Zayn)	2024	—	—	—	—	—	—		Non-album single
"—" denotes a recording that did not chart or was not released in that territory.

=== Promotional singles ===
List of promotional singles, with year released and selected chart positions shown
Title	Year	Peak chart positions									Certifications	Album
Title	Year	UK	CAN	FRA	IRE	ITA	NZ Hot	POR	SWE	US	Certifications	Album
"It's You"	2016	48	71	65	74	95	—	49	97	59		Mind of Mine
"Befour"	2016	85	61	164	98	98	—	51	— (Note: "Befour" did not enter the Swedish Singellista chart, but peaked at number seven on the Swedish Heatseeker chart.)	— (Note: "Befour" did not enter the Billboard Hot 100, but peaked at number four on the Bubbling Under Hot 100 chart.)		Mind of Mine
"Don't Matter (Remix)" (with August Alsina)	2018	—	—	—	—	—	—	—	—	—		Non-album promotional single
"Rainberry"	2018	—	—	—	—	—	33	—	—	—		Icarus Falls
"Good Years"	2018	—	—	—	—	—	16	—	— (Note: "Good Years" did not enter the Swedish Singellista Chart, but peaked at number 11 on the Swedish Heatseeker Chart.)	—		Icarus Falls
"There You Are"	2018	—	—	—	—	—	15	—	—	—		Icarus Falls
"A Whole New World (End Title)" (with Zhavia)	2019	68	89	—	59	—	8	—	— (Note: "A Whole New World" did not enter the Swedish Singellista Chart, but peaked at number 11 on the Swedish Heatseeker Chart.)	— (Note: "A Whole New World" did not enter the Billboard Hot 100, but peaked at number 17 on the Bubbling Under Hot 100 chart.)	BPI: Silver; MC: Gold; RIAA: Gold; RMNZ: Gold	Aladdin
"—" denotes a recording that did not chart or was not released in that territory.

== Other charted songs ==
Title	Year	Peak chart positions									Certifications	Album
Title	Year	UK	CAN	FRA	ITA	NZ Hot	POR	SWE Heat.	UK Asia	US Bub.	Certifications	Album
"Mind of Mine (Intro)"	2016	—	—	—	—	—	92	—	—	—		Mind of Mine
"She"	2016	84	92	—	80	—	42	1	—	8		Mind of Mine
"Drunk"	2016	124	—	—	—	—	58	—	—	—		Mind of Mine
"Rear View"	2016	165	—	—	—	—	72	—	—	—		Mind of Mine
"Fool for You"	2016	149	—	—	—	—	60	—	—	—	RMNZ: Gold	Mind of Mine
"Bordersz"	2016	—	—	—	—	—	95	—	—	—		Mind of Mine
"TIO"	2016	160	—	—	—	—	67	—	—	—		Mind of Mine
"Who"	2016	—	—	144	—	—	—	—	—	—		Ghostbusters
"Back to Life"	2018	—	—	—	—	40	—	—	—	—		Icarus Falls
"Outside"	2021	—	—	—	—	32	—	—	—	—		Nobody Is Listening
"Connexion"	2021	—	—	—	—	19	—	—	—	—		Nobody Is Listening
"Tightrope"	2021	—	—	—	—	24	—	—	—	—		Nobody Is Listening
"Ignorance Ain't Bliss"	2024	—	—	—	—	—	—	—	4	—		Non-album single
"Dreamin"	2024	—	—	—	—	—	—	—	15	—		Room Under The Stairs
"Grateful"	2024	—	—	—	—	—	—	—	20	—		Room Under The Stairs
"False Starts"	2024	—	—	—	—	—	—	—	18	—		Room Under The Stairs
"Birds On A Cloud"	2024	—	—	—	—	—	—	—	3	—		Non-album single
"Nusrat"	2026	—	—	—	—	35	—	—	4	—		Konnakol
"Side Effects"	2026	—	—	—	—	11	—	—	1	—		Konnakol
"Met Tonight"	2026	—	—	—	—	—	—	—	20	—		Konnakol
"Heaven Baby" (with Ayra Starr)	2026	—	—	—	—	26	—	—	1	—		Starr Girl
"—" denotes a recording that did not chart or was not released in that territory.

== Guest appearances ==
Title	Year	Other artist(s)	Album
"You Can't Hide / You Can't Hide from Yourself (Touch of Class GMF Remix)"	2016	Teddy Pendergrass, Grandmaster Flash	The Get Down
"Un Mundo Ideal (Versión Créditos)"	2019	Becky G or Aitana	Aladdín (Banda de Sonido Original en Español)
"Fire Inside"	2022	Yung Bleu	Tantra
"Heaven Baby"	2026	Ayra Starr	Starr Girl

== Music videos ==
List of music videos, showing year released and directors
Title	Year	Director(s)	Ref.
As lead artist
"Pillowtalk"	2016	Bouha Kazmi	
"It's You"	2016	Ryan Hope	
"Befour"	2016	Ryan Hope	
"Like I Would"	2016	Director X	
"I Don't Wanna Live Forever" (with Taylor Swift)	2017	Grant Singer	
"Still Got Time" (featuring PartyNextDoor)	2017	Calmatic	
"Dusk till Dawn" (featuring Sia)	2017	Marc Webb	
"Let Me"	2018	José Padilha	
"Entertainer"	2018	David M. Helman	
"Sour Diesel"	2018	Sing J. Lee	
"Satisfaction"	2019	Bouha Kazmi	
"Stand Still"	2019	—N/a	
"A Whole New World (End Title)" (with Zhavia Ward)	2019	Guy Ritchie	
"Un Mundo Ideal (Versión Créditos)" (with Becky G)	2019	—N/a	
"Flames" (with R3hab and Jungleboi)	2020	Frank Borin; Ivanna Borin	
"Better"	2020	Ryan Hope	
"Vibez"	2021	Ben Mor	
“To Begin Again” (with Ingrid Michaelson)	2021	Marykate Schneider	
"Love Like This"	2023	Frank Borin; Ivanna Borin	
"Stardust"	2024	Frank Borin; Ivanna Borin	
"Eyes Closed" (with Jisoo)	2025	Frank Borin; Ivanna Borin	
As featured artist
"Cruel" (Snakehips featuring Zayn)	2016	Alex Southam	
"Tu Hai Kahan" (AUR featuring Zayn)	2024	Zayn	
