= List of awards and nominations received by Zayn Malik =

Zayn Malik awards and nominations
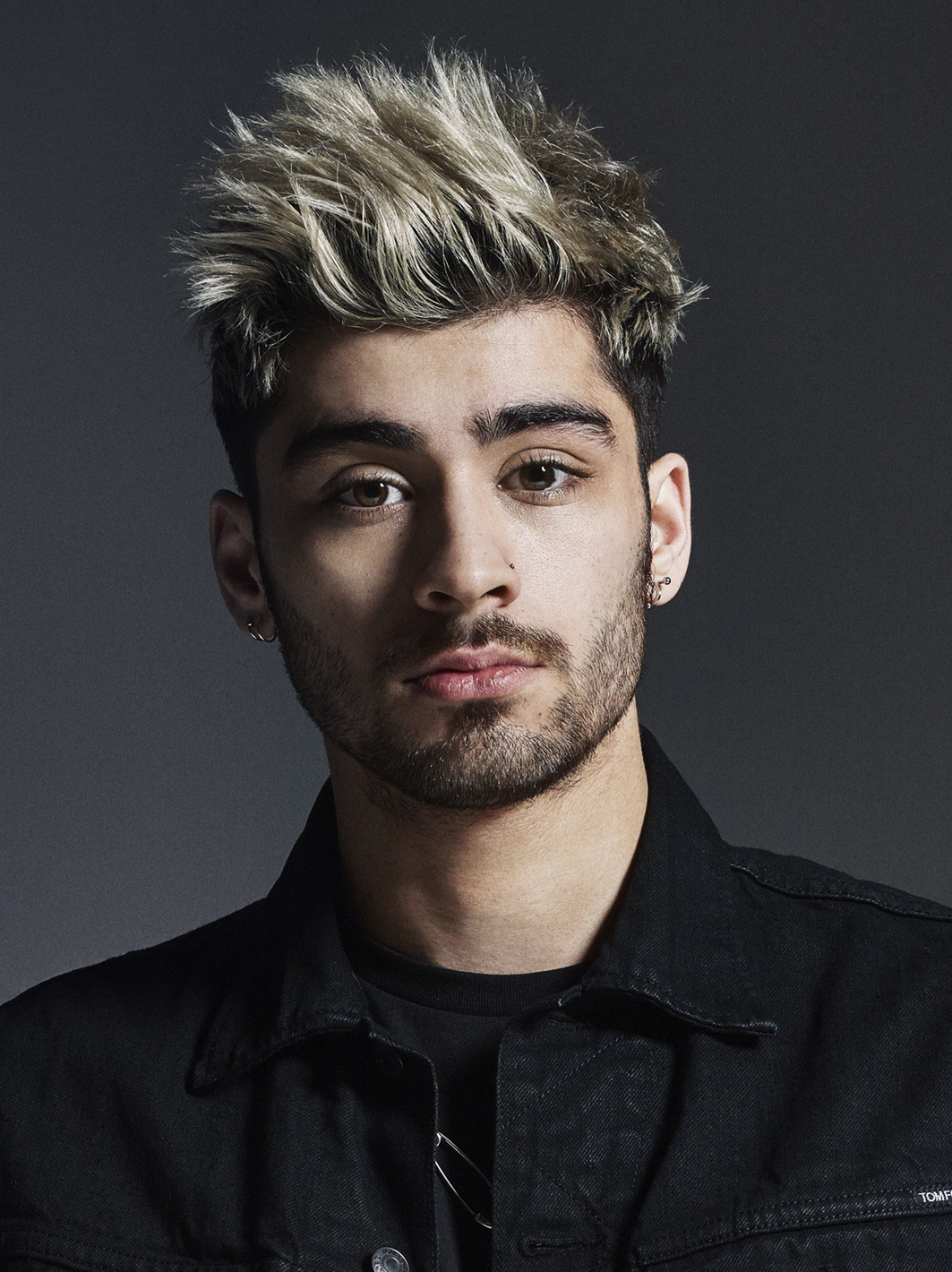
- Malik in 2015
Awards and nominations
Award	Wins	Nominations
American Music Awards	1	1
The Asian Awards	1	1
Asian Pop Music Awards	0	1
Berlin Music Video Awards	0	1
Billboard Music Awards	1	1
BMI London Awards	3	4
BMI Pop Awards	1	1
BreakTudo Awards	0	1
Brit Awards	0	3
British GQ Men of the Year Awards	1	1
British LGBT Awards	0	1
Gaffa Awards	0	1
iHeartRadio MMVAs	0	3
iHeartRadio Music Awards	2	7
iHeartRadio Titanium Awards	1	1
Los 40 Music Awards	0	1
MTV Europe Music Awards	1	2
MTV Italian Music Awards	0	1
MTV Millennial Awards	1	2
MTV Video Music Awards	1	3
Music Awards Japan	0	1
New Music Awards	0	6
NME Awards	0	2
People's Choice Awards	0	2
Popjustice £20 Music Prize	1	1
Radio Disney Music Awards	0	1
Rolling Stone UK Awards	0	1
Teen Choice Awards	3	15
Urban Music Awards	1	4

Totals (Note: Certain award groups do not simply award one winner. They acknowledge several different recipients, have runners-up, and have third place. Since this is a specific recognition and is different from losing an award, runner-up mentions are considered wins in this award tally. For simplification and to avoid errors, each award in this list has been presumed to have had a prior nomination.)
- Wins: 19
- Nominations: 70

English singer Zayn Malik has garnered numerous awards and nominations throughout his career, which began in 2010 through the formation of the boy band One Direction. Malik received two Pop Awards at the BMI London Awards for co-writing the band's songs "Story of My Life" and "Night Changes". He left the group in 2015 and signed a solo record deal with RCA Records.

In 2016, Malik released his debut solo studio album, Mind of Mine, which was preceded by two singles, "Pillowtalk" and "Like I Would". The former won the Pop Award at the 2017 BMI London Awards and received the Popjustice £20 Music Prize. It also received several nominations, including British Single of the Year and British Video of the Year at the 2017 Brit Awards and Favorite Song at the 43rd People's Choice Awards. "Like I Would" was nominated for Choice Music – Summer Song at the 2016 Teen Choice Awards. Malik received eight other nominations in that year's Teen Choice Awards, winning Choice Music – Breakout Artist and Choice Summer Music Star: Male. He was also awarded New Artist of the Year at the 2016 American Music Awards.

Malik collaborated with American singer-songwriter Taylor Swift for the song "I Don't Wanna Live Forever", which was included on the soundtrack to the 2017 film Fifty Shades Darker. It won awards at the 2018 BMI Pop Awards, iHeartRadio Titanium Awards, and MTV's Millennial Awards and Video Music Awards. In 2018, Malik's single "Dusk Till Dawn", which features Australian singer-songwriter Sia, was nominated for Best International Song at the Los 40 Music Awards. The following year, Malik's cover of "A Whole New World" with Zhavia Ward won Choice Song from a Movie at the 2019 Teen Choice Awards. In 2020, a remix of Shaed's "Trampoline" featuring Malik won Best Remix at the iHeartRadio Music Awards.

== Awards and nominations ==
Awards and nominations received by Zayn Malik
Award	Year (Note: Indicates the year of ceremony. Each year is linked to the article about the awards held that year, wherever possible.)	Nominee/work	Category	Result	Ref.
American Music Awards	2016	Himself	New Artist of the Year	Won	
The Asian Awards	2015	Himself	Outstanding Achievement in Music	Won	
Asian Pop Music Awards	2025	"Eyes Closed" (with Jisoo)	Best Collaboration	Nominated	
Berlin Music Video Awards	2016	"Pillowtalk"	Best Visual Effects	Nominated	
Billboard Music Awards	2017	Himself	Top New Artist	Won	
BMI London Awards	2014	"Story of My Life"	Pop Award	Won	
BMI London Awards	2016	"Night Changes"	Pop Award	Won	
BMI London Awards	2017	"Pillowtalk"	Pop Award	Won	
BMI London Awards	2017	"Pillowtalk"	Song of the Year	Nominated	
BMI Pop Awards	2018	"I Don't Wanna Live Forever" (with Taylor Swift)	Award-Winning Songs	Won	
BreakTudo Awards	2026	"Eyes Closed" (with Jisoo)	International Collaboration of the Year	Pending	
Brit Awards	2017	"Pillowtalk"	British Single of the Year	Nominated	
Brit Awards	2017	"Pillowtalk"	British Video of the Year	Nominated	
Brit Awards	2018	"I Don't Wanna Live Forever" (with Taylor Swift)	British Video of the Year	Nominated	
British GQ Men of the Year Awards	2017	Himself	Most Stylish Man	Won	
British LGBT Awards	2016	Himself	Music Artist of the Year	Nominated	
Gaffa Awards	2017	Himself	New International Artist of the Year	Nominated	
iHeartRadio MMVAs	2016	Himself	Fan Fave International Artist or Group	Nominated	
iHeartRadio MMVAs	2016	Himself	iHeartRadio International Artist of the Year	Nominated	
iHeartRadio MMVAs	2016	Himself	Most Buzzworthy International Artist or Group	Nominated	
iHeartRadio Music Awards	2017	Himself	Best Solo Breakout	Won	
iHeartRadio Music Awards	2017	Himself	Best New Pop Artist	Nominated	
iHeartRadio Music Awards	2017	"Pillowtalk"	Best Music Video	Nominated	
iHeartRadio Music Awards	2019	"Me, Myself and I"	Best Cover Song	Nominated	
iHeartRadio Music Awards	2019	Himself	Best Fan Army	Nominated	
iHeartRadio Music Awards	2020	"Trampoline" (with Shaed)	Best Remix	Won	
iHeartRadio Music Awards	2026	"Eyes Closed" (with Jisoo)	Favorite K-pop Collab	Nominated	
iHeartRadio Titanium Awards	2018	"I Don't Wanna Live Forever" (with Taylor Swift)	1 Billion Total Audience Spins on iHeartRadio Stations	Won	
Los 40 Music Awards	2018	"Dusk Till Dawn" (with Sia)	Best International Song	Nominated	
MTV Europe Music Awards	2016	Himself	Best UK & Ireland Act	Nominated	
MTV Europe Music Awards	2017	Himself	Best Look	Won	
MTV Italian Music Awards	2016	Himself	Best International Male	Nominated	
MTV Millennial Awards	2016	"Pillowtalk"	International Hit of the Year	Nominated	
MTV Millennial Awards	2017	"I Don't Wanna Live Forever" (with Taylor Swift)	Collaboration of the Year	Won	
MTV Video Music Awards	2016	"Pillowtalk"	Best Visual Effects	Nominated	
MTV Video Music Awards	2017	"I Don't Wanna Live Forever" (with Taylor Swift)	Best Collaboration	Won	
MTV Video Music Awards	2026	"Eyes Closed" (with Jisoo)	Best Visual Effects	Nominated	
Music Awards Japan	2026	"Eyes Closed" (with Jisoo)	Best of Listeners' Choice: International Song	Nominated	
New Music Awards	2017	Himself	Top 40 Male Artist of the Year	Nominated	
New Music Awards	2017	Himself	Top 40 New Artist of the Year	Nominated	
New Music Awards	2017	Himself	AC Male Artist of the Year	Nominated	
New Music Awards	2017	Himself	AC New Artist of the Year	Nominated	
New Music Awards	2017	Himself	AC Breakthrough Artist of the Year	Nominated	
New Music Awards	2019	Himself	New AC/Hot AC Artist of the Year	Nominated	
NME Awards	2017	Zayn: The Official Autobiography	Best Book	Nominated	
NME Awards	2017	Himself	Best British Male	Nominated	
People's Choice Awards	2017	Himself	Favorite Breakout Artist	Nominated	
People's Choice Awards	2017	"Pillowtalk"	Favorite Song	Nominated	
Popjustice £20 Music Prize	2016	"Pillowtalk"	Best British Pop Single	Won	
Radio Disney Music Awards	2017	"I Don't Wanna Live Forever" (with Taylor Swift)	Best Collaboration	Nominated	
Rolling Stone UK Awards	2024	Himself	The Artist Award	Nominated	
Teen Choice Awards	2015	Himself	Choice Male Hottie	Nominated	
Teen Choice Awards	2016	Himself	Choice Music – Breakout Artist	Won	
Teen Choice Awards	2016	Himself	Choice Summer Music Star: Male	Won	
Teen Choice Awards	2016	Himself	Choice Fandom	Nominated	
Teen Choice Awards	2016	Himself	Choice Male Hottie	Nominated	
Teen Choice Awards	2016	Himself	Choice Music – Male Artist	Nominated	
Teen Choice Awards	2016	"Like I Would"	Choice Music – Summer Song	Nominated	
Teen Choice Awards	2016	"Pillowtalk"	Choice Music Single – Male	Nominated	
Teen Choice Awards	2016	Himself	Choice Style: Male	Nominated	
Teen Choice Awards	2016	Himself	Social Media King	Nominated	
Teen Choice Awards	2017	Himself	Choice Male Hottie	Nominated	
Teen Choice Awards	2017	"I Don't Wanna Live Forever" (with Taylor Swift)	Choice Music – Collaboration	Nominated	
Teen Choice Awards	2017	Himself	Choice Style Icon	Nominated	
Teen Choice Awards	2018	Himself	Choice Summer Music Star: Male	Nominated	
Teen Choice Awards	2019	"A Whole New World" (with Zhavia Ward)	Choice Song from a Movie	Won	
Urban Music Awards	2017	Himself	Artist of the Year (UK)	Nominated	
Urban Music Awards	2017	Himself	Best Pop Act	Won	
Urban Music Awards	2017	Himself	Best International Act	Nominated	
Urban Music Awards	2017	Himself	Best R&B Act	Nominated	
