= Teen Choice Award for Choice Summer Music Star: Male =

Entertainment award category

The following is a list of Teen Choice Award winners and nominees for Choice Summer Music Star: Male. It was first introduced in 2010.

== Winners and nominees ==
Year	Winner	Nominees	Ref.
2010	Justin Bieber	B.o.B; Taio Cruz; Drake; Eminem	
2011	Bruno Mars	Jason Derulo; David Guetta; Lil Wayne; Pitbull	
2012	Justin Bieber	Flo Rida; David Guetta; Pitbull; Usher	
2013	Bruno Mars	Jay Z; Pitbull; Robin Thicke; Justin Timberlake	
2014	Jason Derulo	Luke Bryan; John Legend; Sam Smith; Pharrell Williams	
2015	Ed Sheeran	Justin Bieber; Jason Derulo; Andy Grammer; Shawn Mendes; The Weeknd	
2016	Zayn	Justin Bieber; Drake; Nick Jonas; Shawn Mendes; Pitbull	
2017	Shawn Mendes	Justin Bieber; Niall Horan; Liam Payne; Harry Styles; Zedd	
2018	Shawn Mendes	Charlie Puth; Kane Brown; Liam Payne; Niall Horan; Zayn	
