= Flames (R3hab, Zayn and Jungleboi song) =

2019 single by R3hab, Zayn and Jungleboi

Single by R3hab, Zayn and Jungleboi
- Released: 15 November 2019
- Genre: Dance-pop
- Length: 2:35
- Label: Cyb3rpvnk
- Songwriters: Fadil El Ghoul; Zayn Malik; Naitumela Masuku; Sinai Tedros; Arlissa Ruppert; Jacob Banks; Zak Abel; Lawrie Martin
- Producers: R3hab; Jungleboi

R3hab singles chronology
"All Comes Back to You" (2019)	"Flames" (2019)	"I Luv U" (2019)

Zayn singles chronology
"Rumors" (2019)	"Flames" (2019)	"Better" (2020)

Jungleboi singles chronology
"Hold My Hands Up" (2019)	"Flames" (2019)	"Don't Say Goodbye" (2020)

Music video
- "Flames" on YouTube

"Flames" is a song by Dutch DJ and record producer R3hab, English singer-songwriter Zayn and British DJ Jungleboi. It was released on 15 November 2019 through R3hab's label Cyb3rpvnk.

== Background ==
On 5 November 2019, Zayn posted the cover of the song on his social media with the single word "Flames", in all-capitals. In return, this announcement ignited some excitation from his fans. They were invited to pre-save the song on Spotify. In parallel, R3hab posted the following message: "25,000 comments and we will release this asap". However, they did not specify a release date, just indicating that it is "coming soon". They added that they had to release a teaser very soon, then the song and its video in the next weeks. Indeed, R3hab said, "We're going to drop it asap and we're going to drop a teaser very very soon." On 12 November, the Dutch DJ posted on his social media a short teaser showing the release date of the single. A few days prior the release, R3hab complimented Zayn's vocals on Twitter and also said, "So excited about my record together with Zayn Malik and Jungleboi, Flames, coming out this Friday. Also this Friday I have a show playing in Hollywood Palladium, LA. Cannot wait to play Flames, it is going to be banging, I have got a special version put up for that night." In a statement, he said, "I was working on the 'Flames' song for quite some time together with Jungleboi when we got the call from Zayn. The result is absolutely epic. I couldn't be more proud of the result and look forward to sharing this amazing tune with the world".

== Critical reception ==
A few hours after the announcement, Kat Bein of Billboard called the cover of the song "a red-light" and "Asian-inspired cover-art". After the release, the same writer noted that the song is "part ballad, part electropop banger", endowed with a pre-chorus soulfully crooned by Zayn. She remarked that R3hab and Jungleboi, by their music styles, form a dance-pop crossover. Writing for DJ Mag France, Switzerland and Belgium, Adrien Bertoni noted the anthem "a terribly effective piece", with "a dance-pop cocktail" formed by "Zayn's voice, catchy piano notes and a typical R3hab style beat". Jason Brow of Hollywood Life wrote that the track "mixes together Zayn's smooth voice, a soulful piano melody, and an infectious beat". Mike Nied of Idolator called the song "a staggering anthem" endowed with "a powerful chorus where Zayn lets his voice soar", all this constituting "another solid addition to his ever-growing discography". Writing for MTV News, Jordyn Tilchen deemed the single "an electronic dance track". She added, "lyrically, the song feels like a message from a heartbreaker — the kind that many of us wish we would've gotten before falling head-over-heels into a toxic relationship". Cameron Sunkel of EDM.com called the number "a scorcher", "a hotly anticipated collaboration" and "a dark and foreboding track [which] marks one of R3hab's biggest collaborations to date." Indeed, he noted that the Dutch DJ has released "high-energy dance hits since 2008" but presently, he has been "leaning into vocal-driven originals". And effectively, according to him, "'Flames' falls into a similar vein", by the presence of "strong vocal from Zayn Malik". He also added that the single "arrives by way of R3hab's own Cyb3rpvnk imprint". Your EDM's Mark Fabrick wrote that the song is "both powerful and emotional", seeing "R3hab venture even further into mainstream territory". About its composition, he noted that it is not a pop song but "a blues-y song with some electronic elements", notably with R3hab's piano work. He went on to indicate that the song is not carried by a drop or a riff but by "Zayn's amazing vocal work". He deemed his voice endowed with "an incredible power and range affecting a wide range of emotions". The meaning of the ballad is, according to him, "a warning to a prospective love interest".

== Music video ==
=== Production and release ===
The accompanying music video was premiered on January 30, 2020. It is directed by Frank Borin and Ivanna Borin with the concept and storyline from Zayn.

In an interview about the video, the singer explained, "Flames is a song full of emotions and departure. I wanted this video to reflect this and capture the character's plight which we can all relate to. I love the look, feel, and grittiness that the [directors] captured from my concept." The music video is produced by Daria Ivashchuk with Frank Borin, Ivanna Borin, and Vlad Bolyelov as executive producers. Denis Stulnikov choreographed the dancers and Lena Ignatenko was signed as the stylist The video featured masks from Bob Basset with Grisha Ermolin as the production designer. (Credits adapted from YouTube.)

=== Synopsis and analysis ===
The dystopian-themed video is set in a dark fantasy world, wherein a totalitarian society subjects others into obedience and compliance. It depicts an environment under the supervision of menacing masked figures. Students dressed in all white are shown as captives of an oppressive, male-dominated facility where they are forced to follow the instructions, social norms and action patterns of the institutional center. When enough has been enough, the protagonist, a man in black hooded attire, tries to fight his way out of the bunker in order to make it above ground and to freedom. It shows the man starting to smoke from within and gradually igniting a fire, causing the masked figures to try to suppress him which in contrast turns the flames of the hoodied man into a blazing fire. It continues with the white-dressed social group being chained to the rhythm with invisible handcuffs. The next scene shows one of the masked figures displaying a tarot card with the picture of Icarus' fall, implying the destiny of the black hoodied man's disobedience and a probable benchmark to note the end of Zayn's previous era and second studio album, Icarus Falls (2018), and welcoming the inception of the upcoming one. The next scene shows a building with a Chinese word painted on, that says, "Silence", referring to the singer's reticence toward the backlashes following the departure from One Direction; and Chinese phrases stylized with neon lights are seen that read, "Burning to the ground" and "Rising from the ashes", insinuating his comeback. It is followed by the next scene showing a sports car drifting around the hoodied guy, making a circle resembling Ensō, alluding to the singer's purpose of leaving the band to emancipate his mind and do his own creativity. In the end, the fire flares up from the inside and the hoodied man bursts into flames, a metaphor for a phoenix which obtains new life by arising from the ashes of its old self.

== Track listing ==
Digital download
No.	Title	Length
1.	"Flames"	2:35

Digital download – R3hab & Skytech VIP Remix
No.	Title	Length
1.	"Flames" (Skytech VIP Remix)	3:57

Digital download – Steve Aoki Remix
No.	Title	Length
1.	"Flames" (Steve Aoki Remix)	2:48

Digital download – GATTÜSO Remix
No.	Title	Length
1.	"Flames" (GATTÜSO Remix)	3:32

== Credits and personnel ==
Credits adapted from Tidal.

- R3hab – production, composition, lyrics, master engineering, studio personnel
- Zayn - vocals, composition, lyrics
- Jungleboi – production, composition, lyrics
- Sinai Tedros – composition, lyrics
- Arlissa Ruppert – composition, lyrics
- Jacob Banks – composition, lyrics
- Zak Abel – composition, lyrics
- Lawrie Martin – composition, lyrics

== Charts ==
Chart (2019–2020)	Peak position
CIS Airplay (TopHit)	38
Czech Republic Airplay (ČNS IFPI)	10
France (SNEP)	124
Netherlands (Dutch Top 40 Tiparade)	2
New Zealand Hot Singles (RMNZ)	22
Russia Airplay (TopHit)	37
Sweden Heatseeker (Sverigetopplistan)	7
