= Entertainer (song) =

Single by Zayn

from the album Icarus Falls
- Released: 23 May 2018
- Recorded: Doylestown, Pennsylvania
- Studio: Hopetown Sound
- Length: 3:24
- Label: RCA
- Songwriters: Zayn Malik; Henrique Andrade; Alexandre Bursztyn; Iliana Nedialkova
- Producer: Andrade

Zayn singles chronology
"Let Me" (2018)	"Entertainer" (2018)	"Sour Diesel" (2018)

Music video
- Video on YouTube

"Entertainer" is a song by English singer-songwriter Zayn. It was released through RCA Records as the second single from his second studio album, Icarus Falls, on 23 May 2018. Zayn wrote the song with producer Henrique Andrade and co-producer Alexandre Bursztyn, alongside Iliana Nedialkova. He recorded the song in a studio in Doylestown, Pennsylvania.

== Release and promotion ==
Zayn teased the song the day before its official release with a cryptic teaser from the video uploaded on his Twitter account. Later on, an official Malik update account tweeted a GIF from the video and the indication of Shazam with Malik's previous single, "Let Me", to unlock an exclusive teaser of the video before its official release.

== Music video ==
The official music video for "Entertainer" was released alongside the song on 23 May 2018. It continues a storyline from his previous two singles, "Dusk Till Dawn" from 2017 and "Let Me" from 2018. The music video stars Malik alongside Cuban-American actor Steven Bauer and American model Sofia Jamora. Malik is seen going to a strip club, where he spots his love interest. The two spend a sensual night together. But when his lady love disappears in the morning, Zayn returns to the club to track her down. Billboard called the video "seductive".

== Critical reception ==
Lauren O'Neill of Noisey gave the song a positive review, stating that Zayn "finally leans into his potential" and the song "feels like a subtle arrival for someone who hadn't quite nailed down his sound." She said the laid-back synths suit Zayn's personality, the chorus "has a bit of a fire underneath" it, and Zayn vocally "has one of the best falsetto ranges" in pop music.

== Charts ==
Chart (2018)	Peak position
Malaysia (RIM)	11
New Zealand Heatseekers (RMNZ)	6
Portugal (AFP)	67
UK Singles (Official Charts)	95

== Certifications ==
Region	Certification	Certified units/sales
Brazil (Pro-Música Brasil)	Platinum	40,000^{‡}
Mexico (AMPROFON)	Gold	30,000^{‡}
^{‡} Sales+streaming figures based on certification alone.
