= Teen Choice Award for Choice Male Hottie =

Entertainment award category

The following is a list of Teen Choice Award winners and nominees for Choice Music - Male Hottie. Justin Timberlake is most awarded with 3 award wins. Justin Bieber, Justin Timberlake and Zac Efron share being nominated the most with 6 nominations each.

== Winners and nominees ==
=== 1999 ===
Year	Winner	Nominees	Ref.
1999	Freddie Prinze Jr.	Ben Affleck; David Boreanaz; Matt Damon; Leonardo DiCaprio; Jordan Knight; Ricky Martin; Will Smith	

=== 2000s ===
Year	Winner	Nominees	Ref.
2000	Justin Timberlake	Nick Carter; Enrique Iglesias; Ashton Kutcher; Ryan Phillippe; Ivan Sergei; Paul Walker; Shane West	
2001	Justin Timberlake	Nick Carter; Evan and Jaron; Josh Hartnett; Heath Ledger; Mark McGrath; Ryan Phillippe; Freddie Prinze Jr.	
2002	Justin Timberlake	Brandon Boyd; Josh Hartnett; Ashton Kutcher; Brad Pitt; Usher; Tom Welling; Shane West	
2003	Ashton Kutcher	Colin Farrell; Josh Hartnett; Oliver Hudson; Brad Pitt; Justin Timberlake; Usher; Tom Welling	
2004	Orlando Bloom	Adam Brody; Ashton Kutcher; Chad Michael Murray; Brad Pitt; Justin Timberlake; Usher; Tom Welling	
2005	Chad Michael Murray	Orlando Bloom; Adam Brody; Ashton Kutcher; Jesse McCartney; Jesse Metcalfe; Omarion; Usher	
2006	Orlando Bloom	Chris Brown; Nick Lachey; Wentworth Miller; Chad Michael Murray; Justin Timberlake	
2007	Zac Efron	Orlando Bloom; Josh Duhamel; Taylor Kitsch; T.I.	
2008	Jonas Brothers	Chris Brown; Chace Crawford; Zac Efron; Taylor Kitsch	
2009	Robert Pattinson	Chace Crawford; Zac Efron; Jonas Brothers; Taylor Kitsch	

=== 2010s ===
Year	Winner	Nominees	Ref.
2010	Taylor Lautner	Zac Efron; Kellan Lutz; Robert Pattinson; Ian Somerhalder	
2011	Justin Bieber	Joe Jonas; Taylor Lautner; Robert Pattinson; Ian Somerhalder	
2012	Ian Somerhalder	Justin Bieber; Ryan Gosling; Liam Hemsworth; Robert Pattinson	
2013	Harry Styles	Justin Bieber; Liam Hemsworth; Taylor Lautner; Channing Tatum	
2014	One Direction	Zac Efron; Ryan Gosling; Liam Hemsworth; Austin Mahone; Ian Somerhalder	
2015	One Direction	5 Seconds of Summer; Justin Bieber; Ryan Guzman; Austin Mahone; Zayn Malik	
2016	Harry Styles	Justin Bieber; Cameron Dallas; Austin Mahone; Zayn Malik; Jussie Smollett	
2017	Shawn Mendes	Justin Bieber; Zayn Malik; Liam Payne; Harry Styles; Louis Tomlinson	
2018	Cole Sprouse	Chadwick Boseman; Zac Efron; Grant Gustin; Chris Hemsworth; Shawn Mendes	
