= No Candle No Light =

2018 single by Zayn featuring Nicki Minaj

Single by Zayn featuring Nicki Minaj

from the album Icarus Falls
- Released: 15 November 2018
- Genre: Tropical house; EDM-pop
- Length: 3:13
- Label: RCA
- Songwriters: Zayn Malik; Onika Maraj; Tushar Apte; Brittany "Chi" Coney; Brian Lee; Kathryn Osterberg; TJ Routon; Denisia "Blu June" Andrews
- Producers: Tushar Apte; Sawyr; Brian Lee

Zayn singles chronology
"Fingers" (2018)	"No Candle No Light" (2018)	"Trampoline (Remix)" (2019)

Nicki Minaj singles chronology
"Dip" (2018)	"No Candle No Light" (2018)	"Good Form" (2018)

Lyric video
- "No Candle No Light" on YouTube

"No Candle No Light" is a song by the English singer-songwriter Zayn featuring Trinidadian rapper Nicki Minaj. It was released on 15 November 2018 by RCA Records, as the sixth and final single from his second studio album Icarus Falls (2018).

== Background and release ==
On 14 November 2018, Zayn shared on Twitter a teaser for the song with only the word "Thursday" spelled out on the screen and Minaj's signature "Young Money" in the background.

== Music ==
The Fader called the song a "tropical house bop" and compared its synths to those in "Sorry" by Justin Bieber. Rolling Stone called the track an EDM-pop exploration of "romantic frustration". Exclaim! noted the song's "booming EDM beat with Zayn's trademark emotional croon", and pointed out that Minaj sings instead of rapping.

== Cover art ==
Complex noted the song's "cigarette-assisted cover art", which shows Malik holding a cigarette to his mouth.

== Credits and personnel ==
- Zayn – vocals, songwriting
- Nicki Minaj – vocals
- Tushar Apte – songwriting, production, record engineering
- Brittany "Chi" Coney – songwriting
- Brian Lee – songwriting, production, record engineering
- Kathryn Osterberg – songwriting
- Sawyr – songwriting, production, record engineering
- Denisia "Blu June" Andrews – songwriting
- Aubry "Big Juice" Delaine – mixing engineering
- Iván Jiménez – record engineering assistance
- David Nakaji – record engineering assistance
- Brian Judd – record engineering assistance
- Nick Valentin – record engineering assistance
- Jaycen Joshua – mixing engineering

== Charts ==
Chart (2018)	Peak position
Australia (ARIA)	95
Belgium (Ultratip Bubbling Under Wallonia)	10
New Zealand Hot Singles (RMNZ)	6
Sweden Heatseeker (Sverigetopplistan)	4
US Digital Song Sales (Billboard)	49

== Release history ==
Region	Date	Format	Label	Ref.
Various	15 November 2018	Digital download; streaming	RCA	
United States	20 November 2018	Contemporary hit radio	RCA	
