= Too Much (Zayn song) =

Single by Zayn featuring Timbaland

from the album Icarus Falls
- Released: 2 August 2018
- Length: 3:06
- Label: RCA
- Songwriters: Zayn Malik; Timothy Mosley; Angel Lopez; Federico Vindver
- Producers: Timbaland; Angel Lopez; Chris Godbey; Federico Vindver

Zayn singles chronology
"Sour Diesel" (2018)	"Too Much" (2018)	"Fingers" (2018)

Timbaland singles chronology
"Move Your Body" (2017)	"Too Much" (2018)	"10 Bands" (2019)

"Too Much" is a song by English singer Zayn Malik featuring American record producer Timbaland. The song was released as the fourth single from Zayn Malik's second studio album, Icarus Falls (2018), on 2 August 2018. The song is written by Zayn Malik, Angel Lopez, Timothy Mosley and Federico Vindver, with the production handled by Timbaland, Lopez and Vindver.

== Background and release ==
On 7 April 2018, Timbaland teased the song when he posted on his Instagram account that he was working with Malik on a song. On 30 July, Malik posted on his Twitter a 15-second animated gif with a 1990s Grand Theft Auto style. Malik also revealed the title and cover, and confirmed that the song would be released on 2 August 2018.

The song was recorded in Los Angeles by Timbaland, Angel Lopez and Federico Vindver. The animated single cover shows half of Zayn's face on the right side and half of Timbaland's face on the left. Zayn also released an animated video on YouTube, which he previously teased on Twitter. In the video, an animated version of Zayn dances while Timbaland arrives driving a car.

== Critical reception ==
John Blistein of Rolling Stone opined that Zayn finds himself caught in the desire and the song boasts Timbaland with quintessential beat that synths a thumping drum track, creating a sensual, futuristic atmosphere. Alex Zidel of HotNewHipHop said that Zayn flexes his connections and keeps the intrigue alive. He also thinks that Timbaland brings his vintage 90's vibes meanwhile Zayn flows smoothly in his falsetto. writing that in contrast to his previous work "Sour Diesel", Zayn explores new vibes and sounds.

== Charts ==
Chart (2018)	Peak position
Ireland (IRMA)	89
New Zealand Hot Singles (RMNZ)	12
Sweden Heatseeker (Sverigetopplistan)	17
UK Singles (OCC)	79

== Certifications ==
Region	Certification	Certified units/sales
Brazil (Pro-Música Brasil)	Gold	20,000^{‡}
^{‡} Sales+streaming figures based on certification alone.
