= Fingers (song) =

Single by Zayn

from the album Icarus Falls
- Released: 18 October 2018
- Genre: R&B
- Length: 2:53
- Label: RCA
- Songwriter(s): Zayn Malik; Alex Oriet; David Phelan
- Producer(s): Saltwives

Zayn singles chronology
"Too Much" (2018)	"Fingers" (2018)	"No Candle No Light" (2018)

"Fingers" is a song by English singer-songwriter Zayn Malik, released on 18 October 2018 by RCA Records. It serves as the fifth single from his second studio album Icarus Falls (2018).

== Promotion ==
Malik later encouraged fans to upload themselves dancing to the song and to tag it "#FingersDance", as a "challenge" that they could potentially win a gift from.

== Critical reception ==
David Renshaw of The Fader called "Fingers" a "slow jam" with lyrics about texting, with Zayn singing "'my fingers ain't working but my heart is' over a pitched up vocal sample". Jon Blistein of Rolling Stone said the song "boasts an alluring mid-tempo beat with low synths bubbling around a crisp drum groove", explaining that Zayn "keeps his vocals low, yet seductive as he tries to come to grips with an unrequited love while staring at his phone". Gil Kaufman of Billboard called it a "hazy R&B ballad" that concerns "a love that is so paralyzing that it makes your digits freeze up mid-text".

== Charts ==
Chart (2018)	Peak position
New Zealand Hot Singles (RMNZ)	32

== Certifications ==
Region	Certification	Certified units/sales
Brazil (Pro-Música Brasil)	Gold	20,000^{‡}
^{‡} Sales+streaming figures based on certification alone.
