= Sour Diesel (song) =

Single by Zayn

from the album Icarus Falls
- Released: 18 July 2018
- Genre: Funk rock
- Length: 4:01
- Label: RCA
- Songwriters: Zayn Malik; James Ho; Rob Cavallo
- Producers: Rob Cavallo; Malay

Zayn singles chronology
"Entertainer" (2018)	"Sour Diesel" (2018)	"Too Much" (2018)

Music video
- Video on YouTube

"Sour Diesel" is a song by English singer-songwriter ZAYN. It was released on 18 July 2018 by RCA Records as the third single from Zayn's second studio album Icarus Falls (2018). The song was written by Zayn, James Ho and Rob Cavallo, with production handled by Cavallo and Malay.

== Release ==
On 17 July 2018, a day before the song official release, Zayn announced a new song and later posted on Twitter a 30-second teaser of the music video for "Sour Diesel". He also announced that the video would be released at 12:00 PM on Apple Music. A day later, the song was released to all major platform and streaming services. The music video was released on 18 July 2018 at 12:00 PM exclusively on Apple Music.

== Composition ==
"Sour Diesel" is a funk rock song.

== Music video ==
Zayn first teased the song's music video on Twitter. It was released on Apple Music on 18 July 2018 and was directed by Sing Lee. The video was later released on YouTube on 18 April 2019.

In the video, a group of criminals obtains a stolen gem and later kills the owner. Zayn appears as a superhero who decides to fight the criminals in order to retrieve the gem. Later he fights the boss with the help from a superheroine.

The Video has over 5 Million views as of February 2022.

== Critical reception ==
Mike Nied of Idolator opined that the song reveals a different side of Zayn. He felt "refreshing to hear him making a sonic risk". Nied also stated that the video narrative is a dramatic affair relating "the overarching narrative he created for the era". Entertainment Tonight selected it as one of the top 20 best songs of 2018, ranking it number 16.

== Charts ==
Chart (2018)	Peak position
Netherlands (Dutch Top 40 Tiparade)	20
New Zealand Hot Singles (RMNZ)	26
