= Let Me (Zayn song) =

Single by Zayn

from the album Icarus Falls
- Released: 12 April 2018
- Studio: Jungle City (New York City); Electric Lady (New York City)
- Genre: Pop; R&B
- Length: 3:05
- Label: RCA
- Songwriters: Zayn Malik; Michael Hannides; Anthony Hannides; Khaled Rohaim; Alan Sampson
- Producers: Khaled Rohaim; MakeYouKnowLove; Alan Sampson (co.); Zayn (co.)

Zayn singles chronology
"Dusk Till Dawn" (2017)	"Let Me" (2018)	"Entertainer" (2018)

Music video
- "Let Me" on YouTube

"Let Me" is a song recorded by English singer-songwriter Zayn. Written by Michael Hannides, Anthony Hannides, Zayn, Alan Sampson, Khaled Rohaim and produced by Rohaim and MakeYouKnowLove, it was released by RCA Records on 12 April 2018, as the lead single from Zayn's second studio album Icarus Falls (2018).

== Release ==
On 24 March 2018, Zayn posted a 15-second teaser on Twitter with the "soon" emoji. The video starts with the words "coming soon" and then features a montage of scenes from the music video. It ends with the words "the story continues" flashing on the screen. On 29 March, he uploaded a picture of himself sitting with the song's music video director, captioning the post: "Coming soon". He wiped his Instagram account on 7 April, before posting a second teaser on the day after, which was attached with the song's release date "04.12.18". Starting off with Zayn looking out over the ocean, the clip quickly cycles through music video shots and words in red on a black background. The third teaser was released on 12 April, it showed more clips from the music video and revealed the song's release time, as well as Zayn's character name.

During an interview with Nick Grimshaw on The Radio 1 Breakfast Show, Zayn refused to disclose who the song is about, saying: "It's not always the wisest thing to do, it just complicates things so I have tended not to do that anymore, I just keep it to myself."

== Composition ==
"Let Me" is an upbeat pop and R&B track featuring "a slick, easygoing production". Written and recorded at Jungle City Studios and Electric Lady Studios in New York City, the song is based on a simple beat and an electric guitar sample. Lyrically, the song is about taking care of a partner for the rest of their lives.

== Music video ==
The music video was directed by José Padilha, and it serves as a sequel to the visual for "Dusk Till Dawn". Creatively developed by Zayn himself in collaboration with the director, it starred Cuban-American actor Steven Bauer as a kingpin who attempts to keep Zayn, as Roko, under his control. It begins with Zayn dropping off a black briefcase at Bauer's apartment, where he amorously stares at Bauer's girlfriend, played by model Sofia Jamora. He later arrives at a club to make a delivery to Bauer, after which the video transitions into dreamlike images of him being physically intimate and implying sex with the woman he saw earlier. As Zayn delivers a brief case to Bauer at a club, sexual attraction and tension between Zayn and the woman rise as they pass by each other. Bauer orders his henchmen to take down Zayn as he exits. Zayn quickly overpowers and defeats each of the larger men with martial arts moves. Just as Zayn defeats the henchmen, he turns toward the woman and finds she is being held across the room, gun to her head, by Bauer. Bauer then points the weapon at Zayn. The woman suddenly displays martial arts skills and flips Bauer with a single move, throwing him to the floor. The video ends with the couple sailing into the sunset in a cigarette boat, as the words "to be continued" roll across the screen.

== Critical reception ==
Hugh McIntyre of Forbes found the song "decidedly sweeter and more restrained than his recent offerings", complimenting its ability to not "rely on big electro beats or any gimmicks to sell itself". He also praised Zayn for managing his falsetto "as well as he has much grander performances in the past". Lauren O'Neill of Noisey called the song an indication of "a mellower, more grown-up approach on album two", writing that it showcases "the strong upper part of Zayn's vocal range and falsetto". Writing for Pitchfork in a review of Icarus Falls, Maura Johnston said Zayn's "ability to just barely pull off th[e] bodice-ripper-worthy" opening line, "Sweet baby, our sex has meaning", is a "sign of his skillful interpretative sense". Johnston also called it "a gorgeous opening, straddling the space between the breezy acousti-R&B that dominated the late '00s and the snare-heavy rhythms of modern trap-pop while also flaunting Zayn's falsetto".

Time listed it as the sixth worst song of 2018, describing it as "defanged" and "vapid", the melody as "forgettable", and the verses as "cringe-worthy".

== Credits and personnel ==
Credits adapted from Tidal.

- MakeYouKnowLove – production, vocal production
- Khaled Rohaim – production, drums, vocal production
- Alan Sampson – production, guitar
- Serban Ghenea – mixing
- Zeke Mishanec – engineering
- John Haynes – engineering
- Lewis Allen – guitar
- Michael Hannides – piano

== Charts ==
Chart (2018)	Peak position
Australia (ARIA)	29
Austria (Ö3 Austria Top 40)	71
Belgium (Ultratip Bubbling Under Flanders)	5
Belgium (Ultratip Bubbling Under Wallonia)	34
Canada Hot 100 (Billboard)	33
Czech Republic Airplay (ČNS IFPI)	64
Czech Republic Singles Digital (ČNS IFPI)	31
Denmark (Tracklisten)	26
Ecuador (National-Report)	92
France (SNEP)	74
Germany (GfK)	92
Hungary (Single Top 40)	9
Hungary (Stream Top 40)	34
Ireland (IRMA)	42
Italy (FIMI)	82
Malaysia (RIM)	2
Mexico Airplay (Billboard)	50
Netherlands (Dutch Top 40)	29
Netherlands (Single Top 100)	55
New Zealand (Recorded Music NZ)	32
Norway (VG-lista)	32
Portugal (AFP)	28
Scottish Singles Sales (Official Charts)	21
Slovakia Airplay (ČNS IFPI)	94
Slovakia Singles Digital (ČNS IFPI)	22
Spain (Promusicae)	98
Sweden (Sverigetopplistan)	34
Switzerland (Schweizer Hitparade)	47
UK Singles (Official Charts)	20
US Billboard Hot 100	73
US Adult Pop Airplay (Billboard)	29
US Pop Airplay (Billboard)	22

== Certifications ==
Region	Certification	Certified units/sales
Australia (ARIA)	Gold	35,000^{‡}
Brazil (Pro-Música Brasil)	Platinum	40,000^{‡}
Canada (Music Canada)	Gold	40,000^{‡}
Mexico (AMPROFON)	Gold	30,000^{‡}
New Zealand (RMNZ)	Platinum	30,000^{‡}
United Kingdom (BPI)	Silver	200,000^{‡}
United States (RIAA)	Gold	500,000^{‡}
^{‡} Sales+streaming figures based on certification alone.

== Release history ==
Region	Date	Format	Label	Ref.
Various	12 April 2018	Digital download	RCA	
United States	17 April 2018	Contemporary hit radio	RCA	
