= Still Got Time =

Single by Zayn featuring PartyNextDoor
- Released: 24 March 2017
- Genre: R&B
- Length: 3:08
- Label: RCA
- Songwriters: Zayn Malik; Jahron Braithwaite; Shane Lindstrom; Adam Feeney
- Producers: Frank Dukes; Murda Beatz (co.)

Zayn singles chronology
| "I Don't Wanna Live Forever" (2016) | "Still Got Time" (2017) | "Dusk Till Dawn" (2017) |

PartyNextDoor singles chronology
| "Run Up" (2017) | "Still Got Time" (2017) | "Nuh Ready Nuh Ready" (2018) |

Music video
- "Still Got Time" on YouTube

"Still Got Time" is a song by English singer Zayn featuring Canadian singer PartyNextDoor. It was released on 24 March 2017 by RCA Records, and it appears on the Japanese edition and the 2020 digital re-release of Zayn's second studio album Icarus Falls (2018). The song was announced on social media. Zayn reportedly wrote this song for his sister, Waliyha.

== Composition ==
The song, produced by Murda Beatz and Frank Dukes, has been described by The Fader as "dancehall-inspired pop music with slow, tropical beat" and by Entertainment.ie as "a smooth, finger-clicking slice of AutoTuned r'n'b."

== Critical reception ==
Writing for Billboard, Taylor Weather said: "[Malik's] latest song is a hopeful (and seriously catchy) anthem for the girls who aren't quite as lucky as Hadid." He also noted its "groovy electronic, guitar-plucked beat" Quinn Moreland, assistant editor at Pitchfork compared "Still Got Time" to Drake's "Passionfruit" due to its 'tropical-house inspired production'. She also commented that Zayn 'even sounds like he's having a good time.' Jordan Sargent from SPIN also praised the singer's vocals, commenting that while "purring over a typically great, abstract guitar loop, Zayn sounded relaxed and at ease trying to convince a girl that she's too young to be worried about love".

== Music video ==
The music video premiered on 21 April 2017 via Zayn's Vevo account. Directed by Calmatic, the video is shot through a VHS filter and follows Zayn at a house party surrounded by people skating down the stairs, smoking and pole dancing. The video concludes with Zayn noticing an alligator walking past his paddling pool and then a small monkey on his shoulder.

PartyNextDoor does not appear in the music video.

== Track listing ==
Digital download
| No. | Title | Length |
|---|---|---|
| 1. | "Still Got Time" | 3:08 |

Digital download – remixes
| No. | Title | Length |
|---|---|---|
| 1. | "Still Got Time" (Team Salut and Ray BLK remix) | 3:47 |
| 2. | "Still Got Time" (Vindata remix) | 3:42 |
| 3. | "Still Got Time" (Devi remix) | 4:15 |
| 4. | "Still Got Time" (House Party remix) | 3:54 |
| 5. | "Still Got Time" (Team Salute remix) | 3:30 |

== Charts ==
| Chart (2017) | Peak position |
|---|---|
| Australia (ARIA) | 20 |
| Austria (Ö3 Austria Top 40) | 41 |
| Belgium (Ultratip Bubbling Under Flanders) | 3 |
| Belgium (Ultratip Bubbling Under Wallonia) | 2 |
| Canada Hot 100 (Billboard) | 22 |
| Canada CHR/Top 40 (Billboard) | 47 |
| Czech Republic Singles Digital (ČNS IFPI) | 41 |
| France (SNEP) | 36 |
| Germany (GfK) | 62 |
| Hungary (Single Top 40) | 39 |
| Ireland (IRMA) | 30 |
| Italy (FIMI) | 70 |
| Lebanon (Lebanese Top 20) | 17 |
| Netherlands (Single Top 100) | 52 |
| Netherlands (Tipparade) | 16 |
| New Zealand (Recorded Music NZ) | 32 |
| Portugal (AFP) | 35 |
| Scottish Singles Sales (Official Charts) | 25 |
| Slovakia Airplay (ČNS IFPI) | 52 |
| Slovakia Singles Digital (ČNS IFPI) | 26 |
| Spain (Promusicae) | 20 |
| Sweden (Sverigetopplistan) | 39 |
| Switzerland (Schweizer Hitparade) | 34 |
| UK Singles (Official Charts) | 24 |
| US Billboard Hot 100 | 66 |
| US Dance Club Songs (Billboard) | 10 |
| US Pop Airplay (Billboard) | 22 |

== Certifications ==
| Region | Certification | Certified units/sales |
|---|---|---|
| Australia (ARIA) | Platinum | 70,000^{‡} |
| Brazil (Pro-Música Brasil) | Platinum | 60,000^{‡} |
| Canada (Music Canada) | Platinum | 80,000^{‡} |
| Denmark (IFPI Danmark) | Gold | 45,000^{‡} |
| Italy (FIMI) | Gold | 25,000^{‡} |
| Mexico (AMPROFON) | Gold | 30,000^{‡} |
| New Zealand (RMNZ) | Platinum | 30,000^{‡} |
| United Kingdom (BPI) | Gold | 400,000^{‡} |
| United States (RIAA) | Gold | 500,000^{‡} |
^{‡} Sales+streaming figures based on certification alone.
