= Zayn Malik =

English singer (born 1993)

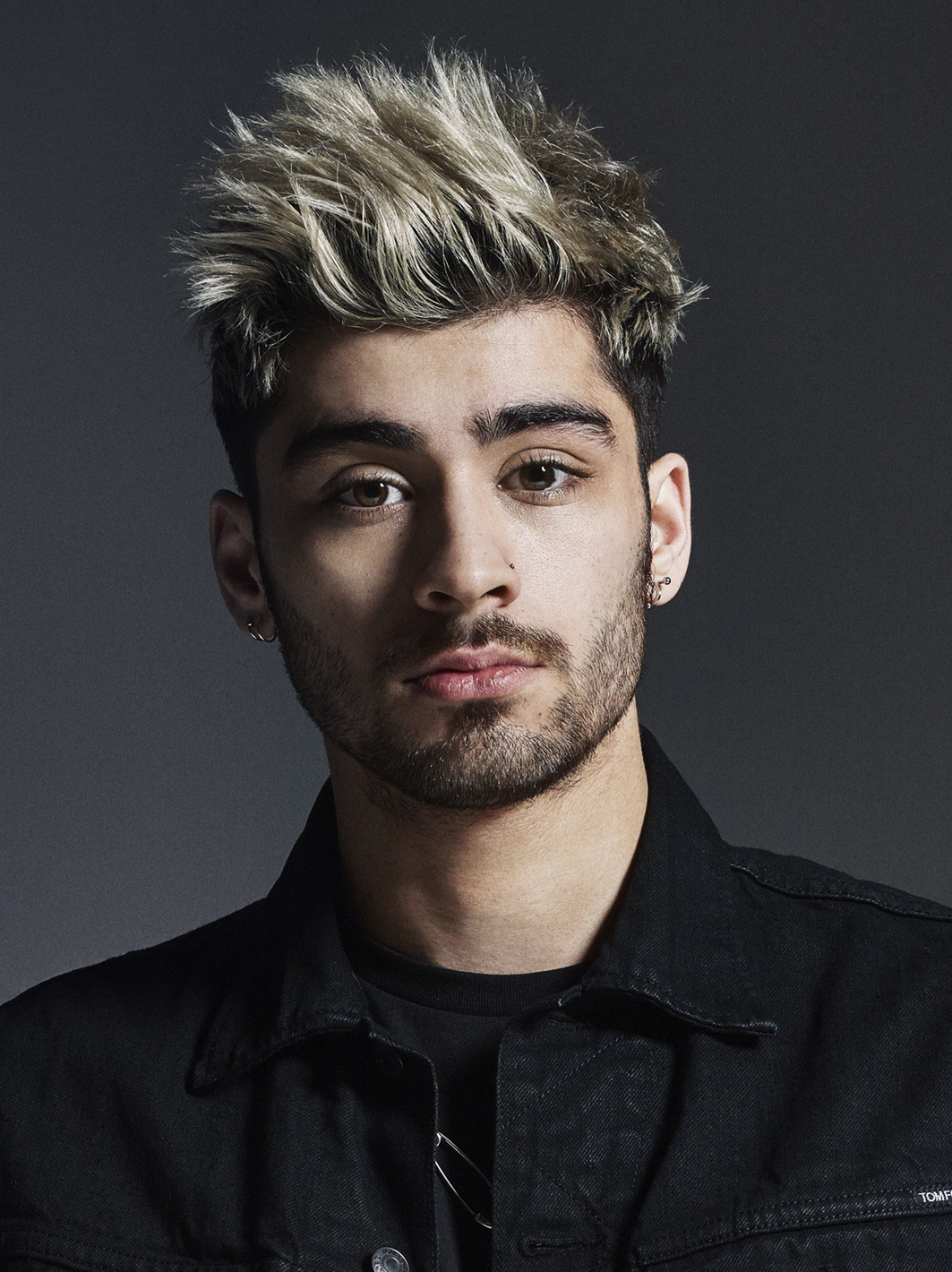
- Malik in 2015
- Born: Zain Javadd Malik; 12 January 1993 (age 33); Bradford, West Yorkshire, England
- Occupation: Singer
- Years active: 2010–present
- Works: Discography
- Partner: Gigi Hadid (2015–2021)
- Children: 1
- Awards: Full list
- Musical career
- Genres: Pop; R&B
- Labels: Syco; Columbia; RCA; Mercury
- Formerly of: One Direction
- Website: inzayn.com

Signature
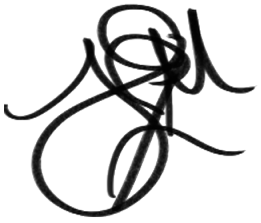

Zain Javadd "Zayn" Malik (/ˈmælɪk/ MAH-lik; born 12 January 1993) is an English singer. He auditioned as a solo contestant for the British music competition television series The X Factor in 2010, where he ended up being a part of five-piece boy band One Direction, which went on to become one of the best-selling boy bands in history. He left the group in March 2015 and signed a solo recording contract with RCA Records.

Adopting a more alternative R&B music style on his debut solo studio album, Mind of Mine (2016), and its lead single, "Pillowtalk", he became the first British male artist to debut at number one in both the UK and US with his debut single and album. His subsequent collaborative singles "I Don't Wanna Live Forever" with Taylor Swift and "Dusk Till Dawn" featuring Sia were met with international success. Further albums followed in 2018 (Icarus Falls), 2021 (Nobody Is Listening), 2024 (Room Under the Stairs), and 2026 (Konnakol). In addition to his music, Malik has worked in fashion, film and television, and has supported charitable causes.

Malik has received several accolades, including an American Music Award and a MTV Video Music Award. He is the only artist to have won the Billboard Music Award for New Artist of the Year twice, receiving it once as a member of One Direction in 2013 and again in 2017 as a soloist.

== Early life ==
Zain Javadd Malik was born on 12 January 1993, in Bradford, West Yorkshire, to a British Pakistani father and a White British mother of English and Irish descent who converted to Islam upon marriage. He has one older sister and two younger sisters.

Malik grew up in East Bowling, Bradford, in a working-class family and neighbourhood. He attended Lower Fields Primary School and Tong High School (now Tong Leadership Academy) in Bradford. As a teenager, he took performing arts courses and appeared in school productions. He grew up listening to his father's urban music records, primarily R&B, hip-hop, and reggae. He wrote raps when he was at school and performed on stage for the first time when singer Jay Sean visited his school. Malik also boxed for two years, from ages 15 to 17.

== Career ==
=== 2010–2015: The X Factor and One Direction ===
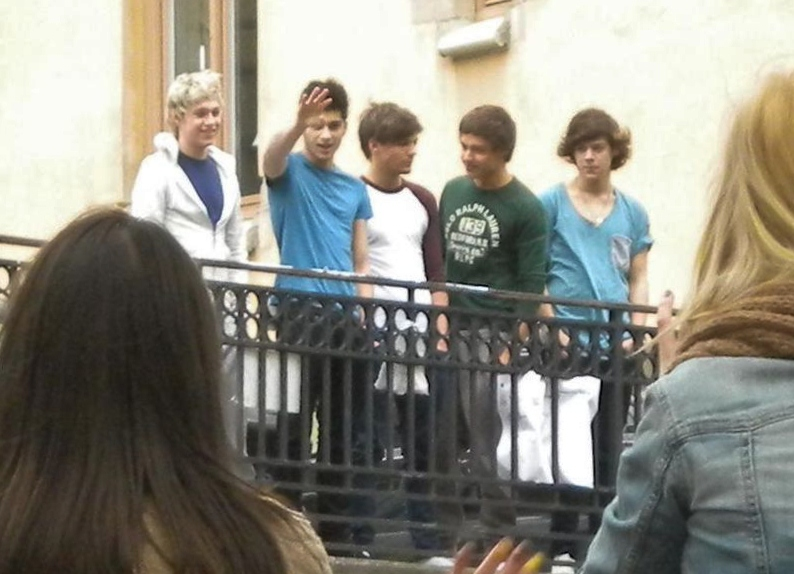
One Direction greeting fans in Stockholm, Sweden, May 2012

In 2010, 17-year-old Malik, on the suggestion of a choir leader who praised his voice, auditioned in Manchester for the seventh series of the television music competition show The X Factor. In a 2018 interview, he stated that he auditioned "for fun, to see what would happen."

On the morning of the audition, Malik became nervous and did not want to attend, but his mother eventually forced him out of bed and coaxed him into going. He sang "Let Me Love You" by Mario as his audition song and was accepted into the next round. Despite being eliminated before the final round of the bootcamp competition, judges Nicole Scherzinger and Simon Cowell grouped him with fellow contestants Harry Styles, Niall Horan, Liam Payne and Louis Tomlinson to form a new act for the remainder of the show — the boy band that became known as One Direction.

After coming third on the programme, the band signed in North America with Columbia Records. The band's albums Up All Night, Take Me Home, Midnight Memories, and Four all topped the US charts. Malik left their On the Road Again Tour in March 2015 due to stress and then the band shortly after; in the band's official statement, Malik cited his desire to live as a "normal 22-year-old who is able to relax and have some private time out of the spotlight", and denied rumours of any rift between the members, explaining that they had been supportive of the decision. In a December 2015 interview with The Fader, Malik expressed that he was unhappy with the group's musical direction, noting that "there was never any room for me to experiment creatively in the band" and "if I would sing a hook or a verse slightly R&B, or slightly myself, it would always be recorded 50 times until there was a straight version that was pop, generic as fuck, so they could use that version". In an interview given to Apple Music the next month, Malik stated that "I think I always wanted to go, from like the first year" and "I never really wanted to be there, like in the band. I just gave it a go because it was there at the time ... I instantly realised it wasn't for me, because I realised I couldn't put any input in". Malik's departure from One Direction has been analysed as creating "an extensive reconfiguration of his image."

=== 2015–2016: Mind of Mine ===
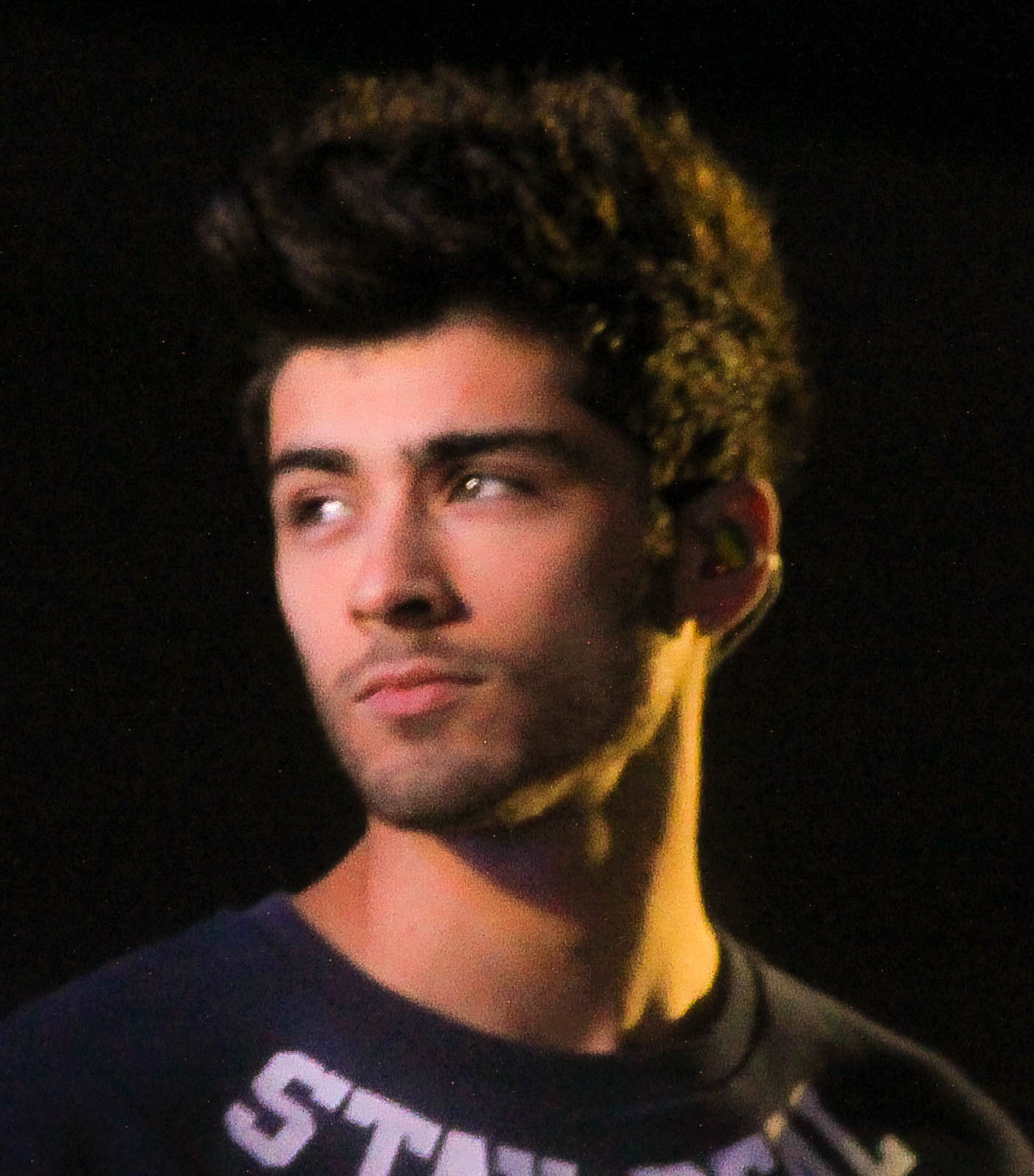
Malik performing during the Where We Are Tour in 2014

At the beginning of his solo career, Malik opted to be known mononymously as “Zayn”. In March 2015, Malik was seen at a London recording studio with producer Naughty Boy. Following his departure from One Direction, Malik alluded to the potential of a solo career, with his first solo studio album to be released under the Syco label in 2016. The same month, Naughty Boy released on SoundCloud an early demo of Malik's song "I Won't Mind". In June 2015, UK rapper Mic Righteous leaked Malik and Krept & Konan's "No Type", featuring Mic Righteous and produced by Naughty Boy, a cover version of Rae Sremmurd's hip-hop song.

By July 2015, Malik announced he had signed a recording deal with RCA Records. Later that year, Malik gave several interviews to discuss his debut solo studio album and revealed part of the track list. Talking with The Fader, he stated "life experiences have been the influences for the album and just stuff that I've been through, especially in the last five years". In a conversation with Billboard, Malik's main collaborator for the album James "Malay" Ho said they went to unusual lengths in pursuit of inspiration during recording sessions, for one "we went camping for a week in the Angeles Forest – set up a generator and a tent so we could track in the woods." In his first solo on-camera interview with Zane Lowe for Apple Music's Beats 1, Malik revealed Mind of Mine as the album's title.

The album's lead single, "Pillowtalk", was released in January 2016. The song debuted at number one in numerous countries, including on the UK Singles Chart and the US Billboard Hot 100; on the latter, it became the 25th song to debut at number one, making him the first UK artist to debut at number one on the Hot 100 with a debut single. The chart performance of "Pillowtalk" propelled Malik to number six on the Billboard Artist 100 chart. He broke international records for the highest first-day and weekly streams for a debut artist. The album's second official single, "Like I Would", reached number one on Billboard's Dance Club Songs chart. The end of February 2016 saw Malik release a remix of "Pillowtalk" featuring American rapper Lil Wayne and contribute guest vocals to the remix of Chris Brown's R&B song "Back to Sleep", which also featured Usher.

Mind of Mine was released on 25 March 2016, exactly a year after Malik's departure from One Direction. It includes songs co-written by Malik, whittled down from 46 tracks he reportedly considered; one of the songs on the album features American R&B singer-songwriter Kehlani. Primarily R&B and alternative R&B, the album blends elements from a number of genres. Despite the variations in sound and genre, Mind of Mine was structured in an "album-as-complete-work" form, maintaining a tightly knit cohesion throughout the record, with an almost seamless transition between and across songs, while maintaining a recognizable, mostly downbeat, "hazy" tone throughout. This gave the album a continuous flow, creating the impression that it all came from one person's "mind". It received generally positive reviews, with praise for Malik's new musical direction, his vocals, and the production.

Mind of Mine debuted at number one in a number of countries, including the United Kingdom, Australia, Canada, New Zealand, Norway, Sweden, and United States, where he became the first British male solo artist to debut at number one with his first album. Malik debuted atop the US Billboard 200 earning 157,000 equivalent album units in its first week, with 112,000 coming from pure album sales. He also became the first British male solo artist to debut at number one in both the UK and US and the third artist to debut at number one on both the Billboard 200 and Hot 100 with debut entries on each chart (along with Lauryn Hill and Clay Aiken). He also topped the Billboard Artist 100 chart, surpassing One Direction's number-two peak on the chart.

The promotional tour for Mind of Mine included his second solo appearance on The Tonight Show Starring Jimmy Fallon, performances on the Honda Stage at the iHeartRadio Theater and the 3rd iHeartRadio Music Awards. In July 2016, "Cruel", featuring Malik, was released by British production team Snakehips. By the end of 2016, Taylor Swift and Malik released a single, titled "I Don't Wanna Live Forever", for the soundtrack of the film Fifty Shades Darker (2017); the song reached number two in the US, number five in the UK, and number one in Sweden.

In November 2016, Malik published an autobiography titled Zayn. The book features his drawings and personal photos. Malik described the writing process as "therapeutic".

=== 2017–2022: Icarus Falls and Nobody Is Listening ===
On 24 March 2017, Malik released the single "Still Got Time", featuring PartyNextDoor. Malik announced the new single "Dusk Till Dawn", featuring Sia, through his social media. The single was released on 7 September 2017, and the accompanying music video, directed by Marc Webb, featured British-American actress Jemima Kirke.

On 12 April 2018, Malik released the lead from the album, "Let Me". The second single, "Entertainer", was released on 23 May. He released the third single from the album, "Sour Diesel", on 18 July. On 2 August, Malik released another track for the album titled "Too Much", featuring Timbaland. "Fingers" was the fifth single and was released on 18 October. He and rapper Nicki Minaj collaborated on "No Candle No Light" as the sixth single and final official single from the album, released on 15 November. On 29 November, Malik finally announced that his second solo studio album would be titled Icarus Falls. Icarus Falls was released on 14 December, containing 27 tracks, including six previously released singles; "Still Got Time" and "Dusk Till Dawn" were only featured on the Japanese edition of the album. The album received generally favourable reviews from music critics but was not as commercially successful as his previous album. Icarus Falls peaked at 61 on the US Billboard 200 and 77 on the UK Albums Chart. On 28 August 2020, he re-released the album, including "Still Got Time" and "Dusk Till Dawn".

In 2019, Malik performed a cover version of "A Whole New World" with Zhavia Ward for the soundtrack to the 2019 film remake Aladdin. A bilingual English and Spanish version, "Un Mundo Ideal", performed by Malik and Becky G, was released on 17 May. He performed a full Spanish version with Aitana. On 26 September 2019, Malik and indie pop trio Shaed released a remix of the latter's song "Trampoline". Malik followed this with another collaboration, the electropop track "Flames", which he wrote and recorded with Dutch DJ and producer R3hab and British DJ Jungleboi. The song was released on 15 November.

In March 2020, it was announced that Malik had signed with CAA in all areas. On 25 September 2020, Malik released the single "Better" as the lead single from his third studio album Nobody Is Listening. The song was his first solo release in nearly two years. Malik described the album as "his most personal project to date". Another song, "Vibez", was released on 8 January 2021. The album was released one week later, on 15 January. On 13 September 2021, Malik released a collection of three songs—"Grimez", "Believe Me" and "47 11"—together dubbed Yellow Tape via Dropbox. The tracks' embrace of the old-school hip-hop sound marked a change in his musical direction. In October 2021, RCA dropped Malik from their label.

=== 2023–present: Room Under the Stairs and Konnakol ===
Billboard reported on 26 January 2023 that Malik signed a new management contract with United Talent Agency for "representation across music, film and television". In June of the same year, the publication further reported Malik had signed a new recording contract with Mercury Records, and was poised to release his first single under the label "very soon" that summer. Malik transitioned from his older pop sound to a newer R&B sound with his single "Love Like This", released on 21 July 2023.

On 28 February 2024, American record producer Dave Cobb revealed in an interview with Rolling Stone that he was extensively working with Malik on the latter's upcoming album, in which he said: "What got me about Zayn was his voice, you can hear love, loss, pain, triumph and humanity in it. I feel as if this record is removing the glass from his spirit directly to his fans. Zayn has really created his own universe on this record, he really has no fear and is speaking straight from his soul". Exactly a week later, in a teaser video, Malik said: "I think the intention behind this album fully is for the listener to get more insight on me personally as a human being". The album was announced along with its release date on 13 March 2024, and was released on 17 May 2024. Malik released a 45 second teaser-trailer on 6 March 2024 and made the album available for pre-order. Malik announced his first-ever solo live show at the O2 Shepherd's Bush Empire on 17 May in celebration of the release of Room Under the Stairs. He performed a selection of tracks from his new LP. Room Under the Stairs spawned three singles: lead single "What I Am", followed by "Alienated", and "Stardust". Room Under the Stairs received a generally favourable reception. The album debuted at number three on the UK Albums Chart, and also debuted at number fifteen on the US Billboard 200.

On 23 November 2024, Malik embarked on the Stairway to the Sky Tour. The US leg was postponed due to the death of Liam Payne. In September 2025, a seven-date residency at Dolby Live in Paradise, Nevada, was announced. Produced by Live Nation and MGM Resorts International, it was described as a "career-spanning" event, and took place from 20 to 31 January 2026. In September 2025, Malik released “Break Free,” a song for the video game Borderlands 4. In October 2025, Malik released "Eyes Closed", a collaboration with the K-pop artist Jisoo. The song was released via Warner Records.

On 4 February 2026, Malik announced that his fifth studio album, Konnakol, would be released on 17 April 2026. He had previously performed several then-unreleased songs from the album during his January Las Vegas residency. On 5 February, Malik announced The Konnakol Tour. The tour would have been his biggest as a solo artist, and was intended to last from May to November 2026. On 1 May 2026, all US tour dates and two UK dates were cancelled, after Malik became ill. The tour began on 23 May 2026.

Konnakol, which is named for a technique used in South Indian music, was co-produced with Malay. Malay also worked on Malik's previous albums Mind of Mine and Icarus Falls. The lead single, "Die for Me", was released on 6 February 2026. The second single, "Sideways", was released on 27 March 2026. Konnakol was released on 17 April 2026. Malik planned to support the release with an appearance on The Tonight Show Starring Jimmy Fallon, though this was postponed when Malik was unexpectedly hospitalised on the day of the album's release. Konnakol received generally favourable reviews from critics. In August 2026, Ayra Starr released "Heaven Baby" featuring Zayn.

== Other ventures ==
=== Fashion ===
In June 2016, Malik released a fashion line, which was designed in collaboration with Mark Wilkinson, and features Urdu script. In 2016, Donatella Versace, chief designer of Versace, announced Malik as the creative director for a men's and women's capsule collection. The collection, called Zayn x Versus, was made available in May 2017. In 2016, Malik made his debut on The Business of Fashion's annual BoF500 index, which profiles the most influential people in fashion.

In January 2017, he released a shoe line with Italian footwear designer Giuseppe Zanotti. The Giuseppe x Zayn capsule collection featured four shoe styles: two boots and two sneakers. In February 2017, the Versus (Versace) Spring Summer 2017 campaign featuring Malik and model Adwoah Aboah was released. In the same month, he co-hosted the CFDA/Vogue Fashion Fund's Americans in Paris annual cocktail party during Paris Fashion Week.

In September 2018, Malik designed a backpack line for French fashion brand The Kooples. He modelled for Penshoppe in their Spring 2018 campaign. He also modelled for Martyre, a jewellery brand founded by Anwar Hadid, the brother of Malik's then-girlfriend Gigi. In March 2020, Malik was announced as the face of Martyre.

=== Film and television ===
In September 2016, Malik was reported to be an executive producer on Dick Wolf's series Boys. The NBC project was reported to be inspired by Malik's time in One Direction.

Malik had a voice role in the 2024 animated film 10 Lives, as the henchmen Cameron and Kirk. He was also credited as the film's executive music producer.

In October 2025, it was announced that Malik would appear in a Netflix docuseries with his former bandmate Louis Tomlinson. The series would have followed the singers in a road trip across the United States, and been released in 2026. However, in April 2026, the series was reported to have been cancelled, following rumours of conflict between Malik and Tomlinson.

=== Philanthropy and activism ===
Malik is an official ambassador of the British Asian Trust charity group, which aims to improve the lives of disadvantaged people in South Asia. In April 2014, Malik donated his guitar to the Kean's Children Fund in Dundee, Scotland; the charity's founder, Charlie Kean, organised an online auction for the guitar and used the money raised to buy iPads for the children's ward at Ninewells. In 2016, Malik sponsored a box at Bradford City for underprivileged children to watch football. In January 2020, Malik donated £10,000 toward a five-year-old girl's medical treatment through GoFundMe page her mother made to raise money.

In May and June 2020, Malik expressed support for the Black Lives Matter movement by sharing links to petitions and donating to the George Floyd memorial fund. During the 2014 Gaza War, Malik posted the message "#FreePalestine" on Twitter, causing him to receive angry responses and death threats online.

In November 2022, in support of an initiative by The Food Foundation, Malik wrote a public letter to British Prime Minister Rishi Sunak urging him to widen the access to free school meals during the cost of living crisis. In December 2023, Malik became an official ambassador of the Hopefield Animal Sanctuary, an organisation providing shelter to injured or unwanted animals. Malik stated that he wished to partner with the organisation to "spread their message and save animals in need."

Malik was one of many artists to sign a 2023 open letter published by Artists4Ceasefire. The letter called for a ceasefire in the Gaza War.

In 2024, Malik was announced as the ambassador for Bradford's year as the UK's city of culture.

=== Yu-Gi-Oh! ===
It was revealed on the Yu-Gi-Oh! Master Duel tournament live-stream on 29 August 2024 that Malik was the celebrity Duelist with the moniker Nocturne.

== Personal life ==
Malik speaks English and Urdu and can read Arabic. He has also performed in Hindi (a language mutually intelligible with Urdu) covering the Bollywood song “Allah Duhai Hai”. Malik has variously referred to his heritage as Pakistani and Indian.

Malik has openly spoken about suffering from an eating disorder while in One Direction, which he attributed to the overwhelming workload and pace of life on tour. He has also spoken about suffering from anxiety and a lack of confidence, especially before live solo performances, having cancelled multiple concerts in 2016 after experiencing "the worst anxiety" of his career.

As of 2023, he had been living in suburban Pennsylvania for several years, "happy to get away from the bustle of New York City." In 2018, he owned an apartment in SoHo, Manhattan, and previously owned homes in Los Angeles and London, both of which he sold in 2018.

In the past, he was a target of Islamophobic attacks. In 2017, Malik stated that he identified as a non-practising Muslim and did not want to be defined by his religion or cultural background. In November 2018, he told British Vogue that he believed in God but no longer identified as Muslim.

In his spare time, Malik enjoys cooking, barbecuing, and playing video games.

=== Relationships ===
After being in a relationship with fellow The X Factor contestant Rebecca Ferguson, Malik began dating English singer Perrie Edwards of the group Little Mix in December 2011; they became engaged in August 2013 but broke up in August 2015.

Malik began an on-again, off-again relationship with American model Gigi Hadid in late 2015. Hadid starred in his music video for "Pillowtalk", and the pair appeared together on the August 2017 cover of Vogue. In 2017, Hadid photographed them both for a Versace campaign. Hadid gave birth to their daughter in September 2020. The family spent a majority of their time at their residence on a working farm in rural Bucks County, Pennsylvania, where Hadid's mother Yolanda and sister Bella own land. Malik tended to horses and cows there.

Malik and Hadid ended their relationship in October 2021, after Malik was accused of striking Hadid's mother; he entered a no contest plea to four charges of harassment. Court papers stated that Malik "grabbed and shoved her into a dresser causing mental anguish and physical pain" and said "lewd, lascivious, threatening or obscene words". He was sentenced by a Pennsylvania court to 360 days of probation and completion of anger management and domestic violence education programmes.

== Artistry ==
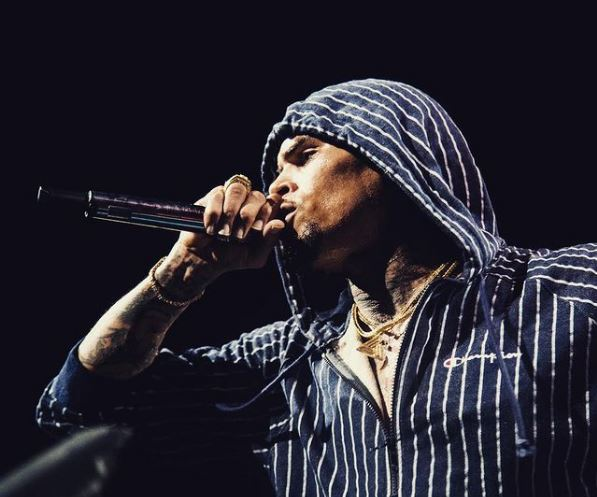
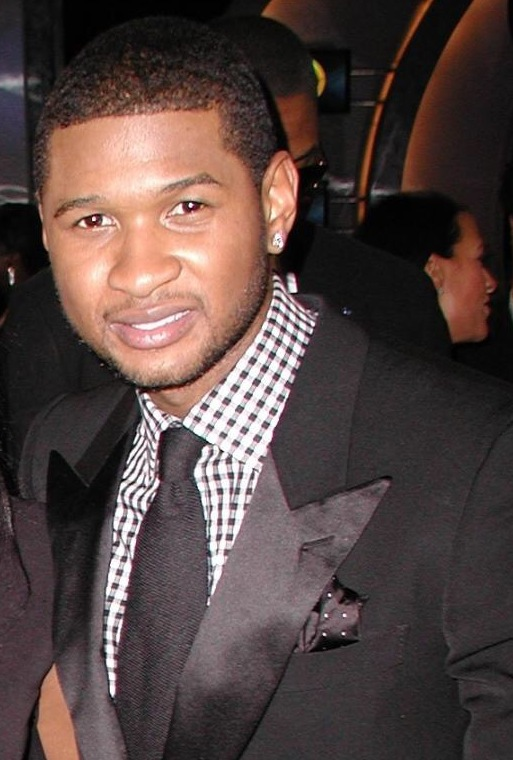
Malik has credited musicians such as Chris Brown (left) and Usher (right) as his biggest influences.

Malik cites urban music as his main musical influence, having grown up predominantly with R&B, hip-hop, and reggae, as well as bop and Bollywood music. He was influenced by his father's urban records, including those by Nusrat Fateh Ali Khan, R. Kelly, Usher, Donell Jones, Prince, 2Pac, Biggie, Gregory Isaacs, Yellowman and Chris Brown. Malik has also described The Beatles as an influence on his work.

Malik originally auditioned to be a solo R&B singer before joining One Direction. His R&B singing style stood out from the band's pop rock style; he later cited creative differences as another reason for leaving the band. His solo work leans towards R&B, alternative R&B and electropop, and occasionally other genres, such as electro-R&B dance music ("Like I Would"), hip-hop ("Pillowtalk" remix), neo-soul ("Truth"), reggae ("Do Something Good"), and Qawwali ghazal ("Flower", where he uses Qawwali vocal techniques such as vocal elisions and warbling).

In an interview with Rolling Stone, Malik stated that listening to Chris Stapleton and Willie Nelson inspired the songwriting for Room Under the Stairs. The album had a more rustic and soulful sound than his previous R&B style work.

Malik possesses a wide tenor vocal range and is known for his belting and falsetto techniques and high notes. He was regarded by Jamieson Cox in Time as One Direction's strongest singer. Brad Nelson of The Guardian wrote, "He was one of the more accomplished vocalists of the group, exhibiting the widest range. He mostly inhabited a silvery, full-bodied tenor, similar to but more sharp and precise than Harry Styles' smoky warble", asserting that his departure would leave "a void of vocal agility".

== Public image ==
Malik was known as the "Bradford Bad Boy" of One Direction due to his mischievous behaviour, scandals, tattoos, graffiti art, and rock star hairstyles. Malik has several Arabic tattoos. His first tattoo was his maternal grandfather's name (Walter) in Arabic: والتر.

Discussing his possible solo career after leaving the band, Billboard editor Joe Lynch described him as "the quiet one in the group ... never the one to grab the spotlight during interviews. He typically saved his words for the songs, not for media soundbytes." A 2016 paper in Popular Music and Society discussed how, after leaving One Direction, Malik's public persona emphasised creative control and "rebellious, rock-grounded masculinity", in contrast to the aesthetics typically associated with boy bands. A 2018 piece in GQ emphasised his enigmatic persona.

In 2012, he was ranked number 27 on Glamour's "World's Sexiest Men" list. In 2014, Malik was voted British GQ's best dressed male. In 2015, he was voted as the "World's Sexiest Asian Man" based on a worldwide poll by the British newspaper Eastern Eye, and ranked number six on MTV's "50 Sexiest Men Alive" list. In 2016, he ranked fifth on Glamour's "100 Sexiest Men" list. Malik has also been included on lists of the most notable British Asians.

== Discography ==
- Mind of Mine (2016)
- Icarus Falls (2018)
- Nobody Is Listening (2021)
- Room Under the Stairs (2024)
- Konnakol (2026)

== Filmography ==
=== Film ===
| Year | Title | Role | Notes | Ref. |
|---|---|---|---|---|
| 2024 | 10 Lives | Cameron & Kirk | Voice role | |

=== Documentaries ===
| Year | Title | Role | Notes |
|---|---|---|---|
| 2013 | One Direction: This Is Us | Himself | Documentary concert film |
| 2014 | One Direction: Where We Are – The Concert Film | Himself | Concert film |

=== Television ===
| Year | Title | Notes | Ref. |
|---|---|---|---|
| 2010 | The X Factor | Contestant; series 7 | |
| 2012 | iCarly | Guest role; S6E2 | |
| 2012–2014 | Saturday Night Live | Musical guest (with One Direction); S37E18, S39E8, S40E10 | |
| 2014 | One Direction: The TV Special | | |
| 2016, 2024 | The Tonight Show Starring Jimmy Fallon | Musical guest; E419, E440, E1978; Surprise Appearance; E1939, E2022 | |
| 2016 | The Voice | Musical guest; Series 10, Finals | |

== Residencies and tours ==
- Stairway to the Sky Tour (2024–2025)
- Zayn: Las Vegas (2026)
- The Konnakol Tour (2026)

== See also ==
- List of British Pakistanis
