= Icarus Falls =

Studio album by Zayn
- Released: 14 December 2018
- Recorded: 2016–2018
- Studios: The Collection (London); Electric Lady (New York City); Hopetown (Doylestown); Jungle City (New York City); Larrabee (North Hollywood); Metropolis Studios (London); Whitelights (London)
- Genres: Pop; R&B
- Length: 96:22
- Label: RCA
- Producers: Henrique Andrade; Robert Cavallo; Brian Lee; Angel Lopez; Yaz Haddad; MakeYouKnowLove; Malay; Khaled Rohaim; Saltwives; Sawyr; Timbaland; Federico Vindver

Zayn chronology
Mind of Mine (2016)	Icarus Falls (2018)	Nobody Is Listening (2021)

Singles from Icarus Falls
- 1. "Let Me" Released: 12 April 2018; 2. "Entertainer" Released: 23 May 2018; 3. "Sour Diesel" Released: 18 July 2018; 4. "Too Much" Released: 2 August 2018; 5. "Fingers" Released: 18 October 2018; 6. "No Candle No Light" Released: 15 November 2018

Icarus Falls is the second studio album by the English singer Zayn. It was released on 14 December 2018, as a double album by RCA Records. Originally planned for 2017, the album was delayed so that Zayn could focus on the aesthetic and sound the album would adopt, marking a shift from the visual identity used on his debut studio album, Mind of Mine (2016). Icarus Falls is a concept album influenced by Greek Mythology and Icarus, addressing themes such as self-love, finding yourself again as a person, and hope.

Influenced by the double album structure, Zayn incorporated several sonic elements in addition to R&B, such as pop, funk rock, trap and electropop. He recruited Alan Sampson, MakeYouKnowLove and Malay, who had already worked with Zayn on his previous album, adding Brian Lee, Dan Grech, Timbaland and the duo Saltwives to the production team. Zayn did not promote the album through press interviews and live performances, which he had done on his previous releases.

Six international singles—"Let Me", "Entertainer", "Sour Diesel", "Too Much" featuring Timbaland, "Fingers", and "No Candle No Light" featuring Nicki Minaj—supported the album; the first peaked at 73 on the Billboard Hot 100. "Rainberry" and "Good Years" preceded the album as promotional tracks.

Icarus Falls received generally positive reception from critics, and peaked at 61 on the US Billboard 200 and 77 on the UK Albums Chart. The Japanese version of the album features the previously released singles, "Still Got Time", featuring PartyNextDoor, and "Dusk Till Dawn", featuring Sia, which Zayn eventually added onto the track listing as a digital re-release in August 2020.

== Background ==
Icarus Falls was originally scheduled to be released in 2017. The CEO of RCA Records, Peter Edge, said the album would consist of a "more optimistic tone to it after coming through that more challenging time", referring to Malik's time as a member of One Direction. In November 2017, Malik stated that the album was "90 percent completed", and would include Timbaland as one of its producers. Speaking about why the album was delayed, Zayn said:

Every day I find another song that I'm swapping out with another one. That's why the album date hasn't really come yet. Even though the album is pretty much there, and I have the material, I'm still changing things here and there.

In early 2018, Malik revealed snippets of clips from the album on Instagram, captioned with "Taster z2".

Icarus Falls is a concept album inspired by the Greek myth of Icarus. He recalls the story of Icarus, who was told by his father to not fly too high but not too low with his pair of wings, rather to follow his path of flight. Overcome with thrill because he could now fly, Icarus flew too close to the sun, where the beeswax binding his wings together melted, thus destroying his set of wings. Zayn compares the legend to the ups and downs of his relationship.

=== Songs ===
Opening track and lead single "Let Me" is an upbeat pop and R&B track featuring "a slick, easygoing production" as well as "buoyant throwback synths, finger snaps and strumming guitar". Despite there being a censored version of the album, "Common" is still explicit and features the f-word in the track once on the CD format. However, the platform version of the album that features the edited version replaces the f-word with "individual". "There You Are" is an upbeat pop song that was compared to material released during his time in One Direction.

"Good Guy" opens the second disc of the album. The track interpolates "Bang Bang (My Baby Shot Me Down)", originally released by Cher in 1966, and "swirls with striking atmosphere".

== Release and promotion ==
The album's release was confirmed on 30 November 2018, and released on 14 December 2018.

=== Singles ===
"Let Me" was released on 12 April 2018 as the lead single from the album and peaked at number 20 on the UK Singles Chart. "Entertainer" was released as the album's second single on 23 May and peaked at number 95 in the UK. "Sour Diesel" was released as the album's third single on 18 July. "Too Much" featuring Timbaland was released as the album's fourth single on 2 August and charted at number 79 in the UK. "Fingers" was released as the album's fifth single on 18 October. "No Candle No Light" featuring Nicki Minaj was released as the album's sixth single on 15 November.

=== Promotional singles ===
"Rainberry" was released as the album's first promotional single on 30 November 2018 after the album became available to pre-order on iTunes. On 6 December, the song "Good Years" was released as the second promotional single. "There You Are" was released on 11 December as the third promotional single from the album.

=== Other songs ===
"Still Got Time" featuring PartyNextDoor was released as a single on 24 March 2017 and peaked at number 24 on the UK Singles Chart. "Dusk Till Dawn" featuring Sia was released on 7 September 2017 and peaked at number five on the UK Singles Chart. These songs were included only on the Japanese edition of the album.

A music video for "Satisfaction", directed by Bouha Kazmi, was released on 9 January 2019. It follows the story of a romance that is plagued by the hardships of war. On 14 April 2019, Malik released a music video featuring a bird's-eye view of various landscapes for the song "Stand Still". On 29 July 2018, Zayn, via his official Twitter account, released a three minute long cover of Beyoncé's "Me, Myself and I" as a taster for his fans. The cover would go on to have as many as 1.7 million views.

== Critical reception ==
Professional ratings
Aggregate scores
Source	Rating
AnyDecentMusic?	6.2/10
Metacritic	70/100
Review scores
Source	Rating
AllMusic	3.5/5 stars
Clash	7/10
Consequence of Sound	C+
The Independent	4/5 stars
NME	4/5 stars
Now	4/5 stars
The Observer	3/5 stars
Pitchfork	6.4/10
Slant Magazine	2/5 stars

The album holds an aggregate score of 70 out of 100 on Metacritic based on nine reviews, indicating "generally favorable reviews". In a positive review, Helen Brown of The Independent stated that with "his maturing soulful falsetto, melismatic yearnings that check his heritage, and muzzy, midnight mutterings", listeners "following the shining thread of Malik's voice will be led through winding passages of hope, dope, seduction and evasion."

Madison Spira of Who gave the album a positive review, stating that it is "different to anything we've seen from Zayn before, and that's what makes this album so beautiful" and there "are so many songs I'm convinced most people will relate to on a personal level."

Dhruva Balram of NME called it a "27-track mosaic to be poured over time and again" where Zayn "really strikes upon his potential."

Rea McNamara of Now gave it a "great" rating of 4 out of 5, praising how "Zayn grapples with toxic masculinity" and how it "reminds us that sometimes life's lows help us appreciate love's highs".

Malvika Padin of Clash gave it a favourable review, calling it a "relentlessly creative" album that "begins the journey to realising his full potential".

Neil Yeung of AllMusic stated that, with "his gorgeous voice and a batch of irresistibly seductive gems, he approaches greatness" but criticised the length, concluding that it "deserves some attention if there's time and patience to spare."

Maura Johnston of Pitchfork gave it a favourable review, stating that, while long, it as a fine "high-concept pop album" that "hinges on the idea of excess and its trickery" while referring to Zayn as "a skillful interpreter of pop" and "one of teen idoldom's most enigmatic artists."

Tara Joshi of The Observer gave it a favourable review, stating that, despite "the intimidating length", there is "plenty here to appreciate" such as vocals "pouring forth a gorgeous falsetto" and often channelling "melismatic Bollywood/qawwali-style singing", a "glossy production," and "a variety of styles", concluding that "Malik is defying expectations, remaining in ascent."

Conversely, Consequence of Sound's Wren Graves praised some of the songs and Zayn's vocals but criticised the album as a long "half-baked concept album" that is "repetitive and dull," while Pryor Stroud of Slant Magazine deemed it "bloated" and "forgettable, albeit expertly produced".

== Track listing ==
Icarus Falls – Disc one
No.	Title	Writer(s)	Producer(s)	Length
1.	"Let Me"	Zayn Malik; Khaled Rohaim; Michael Hannides; Anthony Hannides; Alan Sampson	Rohaim; MakeYouKnowLove; Sampson^{[b]}	3:05
2.	"Natural"	Malik; Rohaim; M. Hannides; A. Hannides; Antonio "Dopamine" Zito	Rohaim; MakeYouKnowLove; Sampson^{[b]}	3:13
3.	"Back to Life"	Malik; Alexander Oriet; David Phelan; Maxwell McElligott	Saltwives	3:15
4.	"Common"	Malik; Rohaim; M. Hannides; A. Hannides; Herbert St. Clair Crichlow; Ava Stokes	Rohaim; MakeYouKnowLove	3:52
5.	"Imprint"	Malik; Oriet; Phelan	Saltwives	3:10
6.	"Stand Still"	Malik; James Ryan Ho; Bach Nguyen-Tran	Malay; FrancisGotHeat^{[b]}	3:18
7.	"Tonight"	Malik; Oriet; Phelan; Brandon Colbein; Katheryn Ostenberg; Jayson Warner	Saltwives	3:40
8.	"Flight of the Stars"	Malik; Oriet; Phelan; James Norton	Saltwives	3:20
9.	"If I Got You"	Malik; Oriet; Phelan; Norton	Saltwives	3:19
10.	"Talk to Me"	Malik; Oriet; Phelan; James Newman; Fredrick Wexler	Saltwives	3:00
11.	"There You Are"	Malik; Levi Lennox; M. Hannides; A. Hannides; Joseph Garrett	Lennox; MakeYouKnowLove; Dan Grech-Marguerat^{[c]}	3:19
12.	"I Don't Mind"	Malik; Oriet; Phelan; Warner	Saltwives	3:25
13.	"Icarus Interlude"	Malik; Matthew Kirkwood	Kirkwood	4:01

Icarus Falls – Disc one (Japan edition)
No.	Title	Writer(s)	Producer(s)	Length
14.	"Dusk Till Dawn" (featuring Sia)	Malik; Sia Furler; Oriet; Phelan; Greg Kurstin	Kurstin	4:27

Icarus Falls – Disc two
No.	Title	Writer(s)	Producer(s)	Length
14.	"Good Guy"	Malik; Henrique Andrade; Alexandre Bursztyn; Salvadore "Sonny" Bono	Andrade; Bursztyn^{[a]}	2:34
15.	"You Wish You Knew"	Malik; Oriet; Phelan	Saltwives	3:25
16.	"Sour Diesel"	Malik; Ho; Robert Cavallo	Cavallo; Malay	4:03
17.	"Satisfaction"	Malik; Ho	Malay	3:28
18.	"Scripted"	Malik; Ho	Malay	3:41
19.	"Entertainer"	Malik; Andrade; Bursztyn; Iliana Nedialkova	Andrade; Bursztyn^{[a]}	3:24
20.	"All That"	Malik; Oriet; Phelan	Saltwives	3:10
21.	"Good Years"	Malik; M. Hannides; A. Hannides; Rohaim; Crichlow	Rohaim; MakeYouKnowLove	3:00
22.	"Fresh Air"	Malik; M. Hannides; A. Hannides; Emanuel Kiriakou; Clarence Coffee Jr.; Jessica Ashley Karpov	MakeYouKnowLove; Kiriakou	2:48
23.	"Rainberry"	Malik; Oriet; Phelan; Norton	Saltwives	2:51
24.	"Insomnia"	Malik; Oriet; Phelan; Samuel Dew	Saltwives	2:55
25.	"No Candle No Light" (featuring Nicki Minaj)	Malik; Onika Maraj; Tushar Apte; Sawyr; Brian D Lee; Ostenberg; Brittany "Chi" Coney; Denisia "Blu June" Andrews	Apte; Sawyr; Lee	3:13
26.	"Fingers"	Malik; Oriet; Phelan	Saltwives	2:53
27.	"Too Much" (featuring Timbaland)	Malik; Timothy Mosley; Angel Lopez; Federico Vindver	Timbaland; Lopez; Vindver	3:06

Icarus Falls – Disc two (Japan edition)
No.	Title	Writer(s)	Producer(s)	Length
29.	"Still Got Time" (featuring PartyNextDoor)	Malik; Jahron Braithwaite; Adam Feeney; Shane Lindstrom; Philip Meckseper	Frank Dukes; Murda Beatz^{[a]}; Blender^{[b]}	3:08

Icarus Falls – Disc two (2020 digital reissue)
No.	Title	Writer(s)	Producer(s)	Length
28.	"Dusk Till Dawn" (Radio Edit) (featuring Sia)	Malik; Furler; Oriet; Phelan; Kurstin	Kurstin	3:59

Notes

- ^{^[a]} signifies a co-producer
- ^{^[b]} signifies an additional producer
- ^{^[c]} signifies a vocal producer
- Khaled Rohaim, MakeYouKnowLove, Saltwives, and Henrique Andrade are also credited as vocal producers for the songs they produced.

Sample credits

- "Good Guy" contains an interpolation of "Bang Bang (My Baby Shot Me Down)" (1966), written by Sonny Bono and originally performed by Cher.

== Personnel ==
Performers

- Khaled Rohaim – drums (1, 2, 4, 21)
- Lewis Allen – guitar (1, 2)
- Michael Hannides – piano (1, 2, 4, 21), background vocals (11, 21, 22), drums (11)
- Saltwives (Note: Saltwives is a production duo consisting of Alex Oriet and David Phelan. They are credited both as individuals and as a team in the credits of Icarus Falls, so their contributions have been merged for readability.) – drums, guitar, keyboards, programming (3, 5, 7–10, 12, 15, 20, 23, 24, 26)
- Match Anderson – guitar (4, 21)
- Anthony Hannides – background vocals (11, 21, 22)
- Dan McDougall – bass (11)
- Levi Lennox – drums, piano (11)
- Alex Al – bass (16)
- Donnell Spencer, Jr. – drums (16)
- Vinnie Colaiuta – drums (16)
- Tim Pierce – guitar (16)
- Jamie Muhoberac – keyboards (16)
- Malay – guitar (17)
- Richard Saunders – background vocals (18)
- Dave Eggar – cello, strings (18)
- Taylor Johnson – drums, guitar (18)
- Phil Faconti – strings (18)
- Donnie Reis – violin (18)
- Matt Kirkwood – bass (22)
- Greg Kurstin – drums, guitar, keyboards, piano, programming (29)

Technical

- Serban Ghenea – mixing engineer (1, 2, 29)
- Erik Madrid – mixing engineer (3, 5, 7–10, 13, 15, 20, 23, 24, 26)
- Khaled Rohaim – mixing engineer (4, 21, 22)
- Manny Marroquin – mixing engineer (6, 16–18)
- Chris Galland – mixing engineer (6, 17, 18)
- Dan Grech-Marguerat – mixing engineer (11)
- Saltwives – mixing engineer (12), engineer, recording engineer (3, 5, 7–10, 12, 15, 20, 23, 24, 26)
- Josh Gudwin – mixing engineer (14)
- Vinnie Colaiuta – mixing engineer (16)
- James F. Reynolds – mixing engineer (19)
- Jaycen Joshua – mixing engineer (25, 27)
- John Haynes – engineer (1, 2, 29)
- Zeke Mishanec – engineer (1, 2, 13, 21, 22), assistant engineer (3, 7–9, 23, 24)
- Beatriz Artola – engineer (4)
- John Francis Meehan – engineer (18)
- Daryl "D-Zone" Johnson – engineer (22)
- Alex Pasco – engineer (29)
- Greg Kurstin – engineer (29)
- Julian Burg – engineer (29)
- Malay – recording engineer (6, 17)
- Paul Norris – recording engineer (11), assistant engineer (3)
- Henrique Andrade – recording engineer (14, 19, 28)
- Rob Marks – recording engineer (16)
- Richard Saunders – recording engineer (18)
- Aubry "Big Juice" Delaine – recording engineer (25)
- Brian Lee – recording engineer (25)
- Sawyr – recording engineer (25)
- Tushar Apte – recording engineer (25)
- William Binderup – assistant engineer (3, 5, 7–10, 13, 15, 20, 23, 24, 26)
- Jack Thomason – assistant engineer (5)
- Robin Florent – assistant engineer (6, 16–18)
- Scott Desmarais – assistant engineer (6, 16–18)
- Pier Giacalone – assistant engineer (8, 9, 23, 24)
- Hunter Jackson – assistant engineer (14)
- Matthew Sim – assistant engineer (15)
- Ludovick Tartavel – assistant engineer (20)
- Brian Judd – assistant engineer (25)
- David Nakaji – assistant engineer (25, 28)
- Ivan Jimenez – assistant engineer (25, 28)
- Nick Valentin – assistant engineer (25)
- Jacob Richards – assistant engineer (27)
- Michael Seaberg – assistant engineer (27)
- Rashawn Mclean – assistant engineer (27)
- Jamie Peters – assistant engineer (28)
- Loren McLean – assistant engineer (28)

== Charts ==
Chart performance for Icarus Falls
Chart (2018–19)	Peak position
Australian Albums (ARIA)	60
Belgian Albums (Ultratop Flanders)	98
Belgian Albums (Ultratop Wallonia)	170
Canadian Albums (Billboard)	24
Czech Albums (ČNS IFPI)	53
Danish Albums (Hitlisten)	26
Dutch Albums (Album Top 100)	40
Finnish Albums (Suomen virallinen lista)	31
German Albums (Offizielle Top 100)	63
Irish Albums (IRMA)	97
Japanese Albums (Oricon)	145
Norwegian Albums (VG-lista)	31
Spanish Albums (Promusicae)	35
Swedish Albums (Sverigetopplistan)	30
Swiss Albums (Schweizer Hitparade)	81
UK Albums (Official Charts)	77
US Billboard 200	61

== Certifications ==
Certifications for Icarus Falls
Region	Certification	Certified units/sales
Brazil (Pro-Música Brasil)	2× Platinum	80,000^{‡}
Canada (Music Canada)	Gold	40,000^{‡}
Denmark (IFPI Danmark)	Gold	10,000^{‡}
New Zealand (RMNZ)	Gold	7,500^{‡}
Poland (ZPAV)	Platinum	20,000^{‡}
Singapore (RIAS)	Platinum	10,000^{*}
Switzerland (IFPI Switzerland)	Gold	10,000^{‡}
United Kingdom (BPI)	Silver	60,000^{‡}
United States (RIAA)	Gold	500,000^{‡}
^{*} Sales figures based on certification alone.^{‡} Sales+streaming figures based on certification alone.

== Release history ==
Release history and formats for Icarus Falls
Region	Date	Format(s)	Label	Ref.
Various	14 December 2018	Digital download; streaming	RCA	
United States	21 December 2018	CD; digital download; streaming	RCA	
Japan	21 December 2018	CD	Sony Music	
