= Trampoline (Shaed song) =

2018 single by Shaed

Single by Shaed

from the EP Melt
- Released: May 18, 2018
- Genre: Alternative pop; electro
- Length: 3:04
- Label: Photo Finish
- Songwriters: Chelsea Lee; Max Ernst; Spencer Ernst
- Producers: Alex Mendoza; Grant Eadie; Shaed

Shaed singles chronology
"Lonesome" (2017)	"Trampoline" (2018)	"You Got Me Like" (2018)

Music video
- "Trampoline" on YouTube

"Trampoline" is a song by American indie pop trio Shaed. It was released on May 18, 2018, as a single from their EP Melt. The song was used in a commercial for the MacBook Air in October 2018. It reached number 13 on the Billboard Hot 100 and number one on the US Billboard Alternative Airplay chart in 2019, spending a total of 63 weeks on the latter tally. In February 2021, the Jauz remix version of this song was used in season one, episode one of the Netflix series Ginny & Georgia.

In late 2023, for Alternative Airplay's 35th anniversary, Billboard ranked the top 100 best-performing songs in the chart's history; "Trampoline" was placed at number 11.

== Composition ==
The song has been called a "lush alt-pop head-nodder with a snapping beat and an inspired whistle break". It is written in the key of G minor at a moderately slow tempo of 63-66 beats per minute.

== Critical reception ==
Variety called the song a "jazzy electro-jam". Earmilk described the track as an "exhilarating mix of electronic soundscapes featuring delicately calm clicking and a captivating rush of keyboard". Billboard named it the 51st best song of 2019.

== Zayn remix ==
"Trampoline"

Single by Shaed with Zayn

from the album Melt (Deluxe) and High Dive
- Released: September 26, 2019
- Length: 3:04
- Label: Photo Finish
- Songwriters: Chelsea Lee; Max Ernst; Spencer Ernst; Zayn Malik
- Producers: Alex Mendoza; Grant Eadie; Shaed

Zayn singles chronology
"No Candle No Light" (2018)	"Trampoline" (2019)	"Rumors" (2019)

Lyric video
- "Trampoline (Remix)" on YouTube

A remix from Grammy Winning remixer Dave Audé featuring British singer-songwriter Zayn was released on September 26, 2019. The remix was later included on the deluxe edition of Melt and on their debut studio album High Dive.

== Charts ==
=== Weekly charts ===
Weekly chart performance for "Trampoline"
Chart (2018–2020)	Peak position
Austria (Ö3 Austria Top 40)	53
Belgium (Ultratip Bubbling Under Wallonia)	25
Canada (Canadian Hot 100)	39
Canada CHR/Top 40 (Billboard)	32
Canada Hot AC (Billboard)	23
Canada Rock (Billboard)	24
Czech Republic Singles Digital (ČNS IFPI)	44
France (SNEP)	29
Germany (GfK)	62
Iceland (Tónlistinn)	9
Ireland (IRMA)	21
Portugal (AFP)	70
Scottish Singles Sales (Official Charts)	48
Slovakia Singles Digital (ČNS IFPI)	28
Switzerland (Schweizer Hitparade)	18
UK Singles (Official Charts)	52
US Billboard Hot 100	13
US Adult Contemporary (Billboard)	12
US Adult Top 40 (Billboard)	4
US Dance/Mix Show Airplay (Billboard)	23
US Dance Club Songs (Billboard)	1
US Mainstream Top 40 (Billboard)	4
US Rock Airplay (Billboard)	1
US Rolling Stone Top 100	93

Weekly chart performance for the Zayn remix of "Trampoline"
Chart (2019–2020)	Peak position
Australia (ARIA)	27
Belgium (Ultratop 50 Flanders)	24
Belgium (Ultratop 50 Wallonia)	4
Czech Republic Airplay (ČNS IFPI)	2
Czech Republic Singles Digital (ČNS IFPI)	56
Greece (IFPI)	20
Hungary (Stream Top 40)	17
Latvia (LAIPA)	21
Lithuania (AGATA)	10
Malaysia (RIM)	15
Netherlands (Single Top 100)	64
New Zealand (Recorded Music NZ)	9
Norway (VG-lista)	13
Singapore (RIAS)	14
Slovakia Singles Digital (ČNS IFPI)	46
Sweden (Sverigetopplistan)	64
US Rolling Stone Top 100	94

=== Year-end charts ===
2019 year-end chart performance for "Trampoline"
Chart (2019)	Position
Switzerland (Schweizer Hitparade)	53
US Billboard Hot 100	70
US Adult Top 40 (Billboard)	39
US Mainstream Top 40 (Billboard)	29
US Rock Airplay (Billboard)	2

2020 year-end chart performance for "Trampoline"
Chart (2020)	Position
Belgium (Ultratop Flanders)	54
Belgium (Ultratop Wallonia)	43
France (SNEP)	69
New Zealand (Recorded Music NZ)	47
US Billboard Hot 100	53
US Adult Contemporary (Billboard)	20
US Adult Top 40 (Billboard)	23
US Alternative Airplay (Billboard)	35
US Mainstream Top 40 (Billboard)	32

== Certifications ==
Certifications and sales for "Trampoline"
Region	Certification	Certified units/sales
Australia (ARIA)	2× Platinum	140,000^{‡}
Belgium (BRMA)	Platinum	40,000^{‡}
Brazil (Pro-Música Brasil)	Diamond	160,000^{‡}
Canada (Music Canada)	3× Platinum	240,000^{‡}
Denmark (IFPI Danmark)	Gold	45,000^{‡}
France (SNEP)	Diamond	333,333^{‡}
Germany (BVMI)	Gold	200,000^{‡}
Italy (FIMI)	Gold	35,000^{‡}
Mexico (AMPROFON)	Gold	30,000^{‡}
Netherlands (NVPI)	Gold	40,000^{‡}
New Zealand (RMNZ)	4× Platinum	120,000^{‡}
Norway (IFPI Norway)	Platinum	60,000^{‡}
Poland (ZPAV)	Platinum	20,000^{‡}
Portugal (AFP)	Platinum	10,000^{‡}
Spain (Promusicae)	Gold	30,000^{‡}
Switzerland (IFPI Switzerland)	3× Platinum	60,000^{‡}
United Kingdom (BPI)	Gold	400,000^{‡}
United States (RIAA)	4× Platinum	4,000,000^{‡}
Streaming
Sweden (GLF)	Gold	4,000,000^{†}
^{‡} Sales+streaming figures based on certification alone.^{†} Streaming-only figures based on certification alone.

== See also ==
- List of Billboard number-one dance songs of 2019
