= Shaed =

American indie pop trio

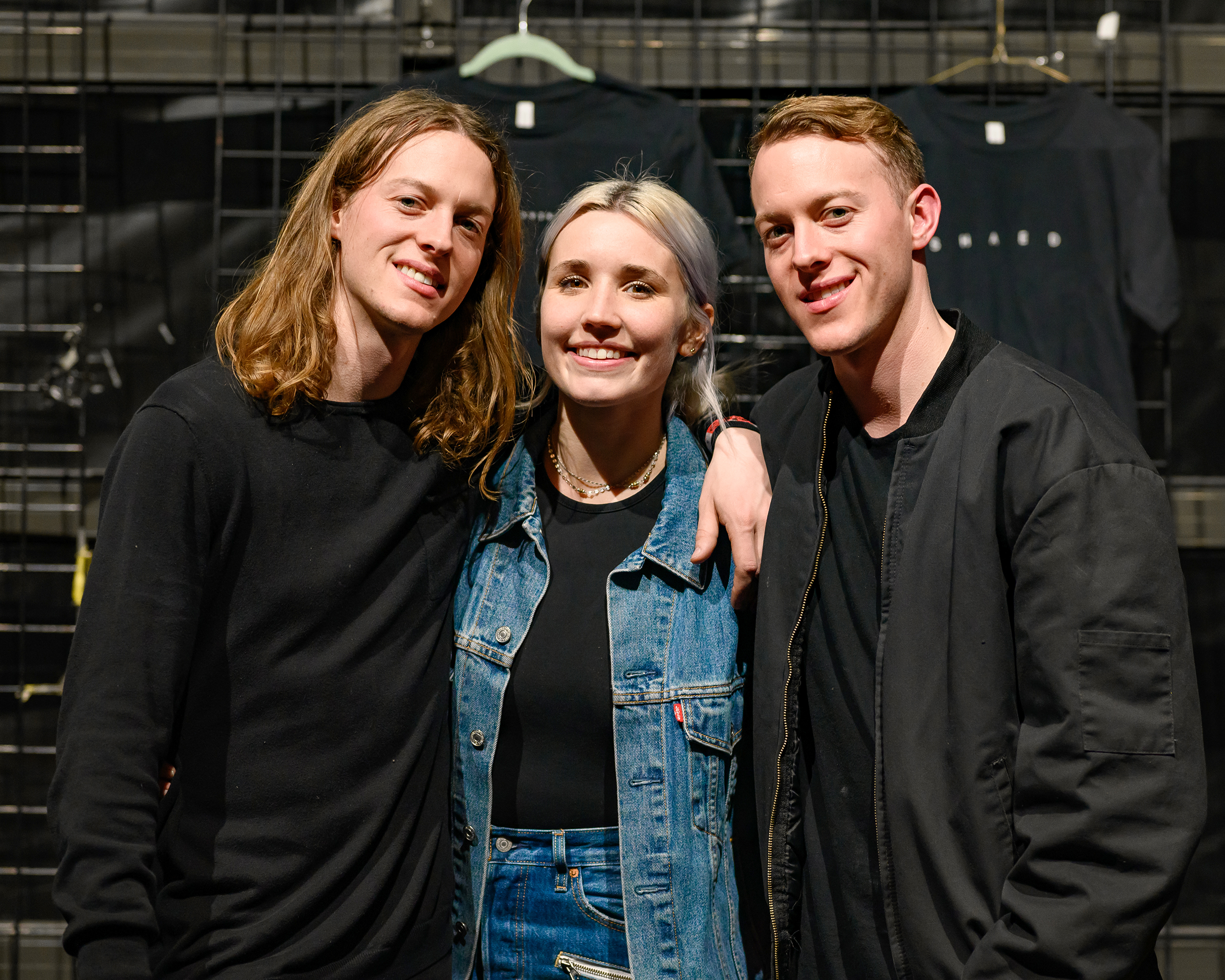
- Shaed at the Constellation Room in 2019

Background information
- Origin: Washington, D.C., U.S.
- Genres: Electropop; indie pop
- Years active: 2011–present
- Labels: Photo Finish; BMG
- Members: Chelsea Lee; Max Ernst; Spencer Ernst
- Website: www.shaedband.com

Shaed (stylized SHAED, pronounced "shade") is an American indie pop trio based in Washington, D.C. The group consists of lead vocalist Chelsea Lee and multi-instrumentalists Max and Spencer Ernst. They released their breakthrough single "Trampoline" in June 2018.

== History ==
SHAED logo

Twin siblings Max and Spencer Ernst grew up in Silver Spring, Maryland, and showed an interest in music from a very young age. In middle school, they and some friends formed a rock band called Upslide. Upslide performed locally in the Washington metropolitan area for several years, which eventually led the twins to attract the attention of a New York-based management company, Magus Entertainment, who secured them a publishing deal with Cherry Lane Music. While attending Gonzaga College High School, they formed a pop duo called Trust Fall and began touring other parts of the country. Max and Spencer met Chelsea Lee in 2007 while they were performing at the 9:30 Club, a club in Washington D.C.

Around 2009, Chelsea signed as a solo artist with Atlantic Records. The same year, Max announced his homosexuality to his brother. In 2010, Chelsea and Spencer both began a romantic relationship.

Following high school, the Ernst twins deferred attending college in hopes of getting a record deal with Epic Records. The deal ultimately fell through, and they both went to the University of Maryland, College Park in the spring. While attending college, the twins formed a folk rock duo called The Walking Sticks. The Walking Sticks released their debut EP World So Bright on June 27, 2012, when the twins were in their senior year of college. The songs on the album were all recorded live, and featured an acoustic roots rock sound.

Having ended her solo contract with Atlantic Records in 2011, Lee joined The Walking Sticks sometime after World So Bright was released. In late 2013, The Walking Sticks released their second EP, Send the Night. With this release, the group completely changed their music style, transitioning from folk rock to dream-pop.

In March 2016, The Walking Sticks changed their name to Shaed, in recognition of their new stylistic leanings. They signed with Photo Finish Records by June 2016, and toured with Marian Hill and Vérité in the fall of 2016. In September 2016, Shaed released Just Wanna See, their debut EP under their new name. Their single "Name On It" was the featured track for a Victoria's Secret commercial which debuted on May 15, 2018. In April 2017, Shaed went on tour again as an opener for Bishop Briggs.

In September 2017, the band moved into a house together, and began recording in a home studio for their second EP, Melt. On May 18, 2018, Shaed debuted their first single from the EP, "Trampoline". The group released Melt on September 21, 2018, via Photo Finish Records. On October 30, 2018, Apple debuted their MacBook Air commercial featuring "Trampoline". Chelsea Lee and Spencer Ernst were married in Arlington, Virginia during the first weekend of October 2018.

Their new single "No Other Way" was released on October 16, 2020, via Photo Finish Records.

Chelsea and Spencer welcomed daughter June River on January 29, 2022, according to the band's Instagram page.

== Band members ==
- Chelsea Lee – lead vocals (c. 2011–present)
- Spencer Ernst – keyboards, drums, guitars, vocals (2011–present)
- Max Ernst – keyboards, drums, guitars, vocals (2011–present)

== Discography ==
=== Studio albums ===
| Title | Album details |
|---|---|
| High Dive | Released: May 14, 2021; Label: Photo Finish; Formats: Digital download, streaming |
| Spinning Out | Released: June 14, 2024; Label: BMG; Formats: LP, digital download, streaming |

=== Extended plays ===
| Title | EP details | Peak chart positions | |
| Title | EP details | US | FRA |
|---|---|---|---|
| Just Wanna See | Released: January 1, 2016; Label: Photo Finish; Formats: Digital download, streaming | — | — |
| Melt | Released: September 21, 2018; Label: Photo Finish; Formats: Digital download, streaming | 132 | 163 |
"—" denotes a recording that did not chart or was not released in that territory.

==== Independent extended plays ====
- World So Bright (2012)
- Send the Night (2013)
- Pop Dreams (2014)

=== Singles ===
| Title | Year | Peak chart positions | | | | | | | | | | Certifications | Album |
| Title | Year | US | US Alt. | AUS | BEL (FL) | BEL (WA) | CAN | FRA | IRE | SWI | UK | Certifications | Album |
|---|---|---|---|---|---|---|---|---|---|---|---|---|---|
| "Name On It" (Note: This song only appears on the deluxe edition of Melt.) | 2016 | — | — | — | — | — | — | — | — | — | — | | Just Wanna See and Melt |
| "Too Much" | 2017 | — | — | — | — | — | — | — | — | — | — | | Melt |
| "Lonesome" | 2017 | — | — | — | — | — | — | — | — | — | — | | Melt |
| "Trampoline" (original or remix with Zayn) (Note: The remix of this song appears on High Dive and the deluxe edition of Melt.) | 2018 | 13 | 1 | 27 | 24 | 4 | 39 | 29 | 21 | 18 | 52 | RIAA: 3× Platinum; ARIA: 2× Platinum; BEA: Platinum; BPI: Gold; IFPI SWI: 3× Platinum; MC: 3× Platinum; SNEP: Diamond | Melt |
| "You Got Me Like" (with Snny) | 2018 | — | — | — | — | — | — | — | — | — | — | | Melt |
| "Thunder" | 2019 | — | 20 | — | — | — | — | — | — | — | — | | Just Wanna See and Melt |
| "2 in a Million" (with Steve Aoki and Sting) | 2019 | — | — | — | — | — (Note: "2 in a Million" did not enter the Wallonia Ultratop 50, but peaked at number 36 on the Ultratip chart.) | — | — | — | — | — | | Neon Future IV |
| "No Other Way" | 2020 | — | 17 | — | — | — | — | — | — | — | — | | High Dive |
| "Once Upon a Time" | 2020 | — | — | — | — | — | — | — | — | — | — | | High Dive |
| "Part Time Psycho" (with Two Feet) | 2021 | — | — | — | — | — | — | — | — | — | — | | High Dive |
| "Osaka" | 2021 | — | — | — | — | — | — | — | — | — | — | | High Dive |
| "Dizzy" | 2021 | — | — | — | — | — | — | — | — | — | — | | High Dive |
| "Everybody Knows I'm High" | 2024 | — | — | — | — | — | — | — | — | — | — | | Spinning Out |
"—" denotes a recording that did not chart or was not released in that territory.
