= Dusk Till Dawn (Zayn song) =

2017 single by Zayn featuring Sia

Single by Zayn featuring Sia
- Released: 8 September 2017
- Recorded: 2017
- Genre: Pop
- Length: 4:27 (single version); 3:59 (radio edit)
- Label: RCA
- Songwriters: Zayn Malik; Sia Furler; Alex Oriet; David Phelan; Greg Kurstin
- Producer: Greg Kurstin

Zayn singles chronology
"Still Got Time" (2017)	"Dusk Till Dawn" (2017)	"Let Me" (2018)

Sia singles chronology
"Free Me" (2017)	"Dusk Till Dawn" (2017)	"Rainbow" (2017)

Music video
- "Dusk Till Dawn" on YouTube

"Dusk Till Dawn" is a song recorded by English singer-songwriter Zayn featuring Australian singer-songwriter Sia. It was released on 8 September 2017 by RCA Records and appears on the Japanese edition of Zayn's second studio album, Icarus Falls (2018), while the radio edit appears on the 2020 reissue of the album. It was written by Zayn Malik, Sia Furler, Alex Oriet, David Phelan and Greg Kurstin, and produced by Kurstin. The song's accompanying music video was released on the same day and features Zayn and British-American actress Jemima Kirke. The song is featured in the official trailer for the 2017 film The Mountain Between Us. Commercially, the single peaked at number five on the UK Singles Chart. It also topped the charts in seven countries and peaked within the top ten on the charts in more than twenty countries including: Australia, Belgium, Canada, Finland, France, Germany, Ireland, Italy, the Netherlands, New Zealand, Norway, Portugal, Russia, Scotland, Slovenia, and Sweden.

== Composition ==
"Dusk Till Dawn" is a pop power ballad. Fact described the song as a "stadium ballad" adding that "instead of running away from his pop roots [Zayn] seems to be relaxing and re-embracing those pop beginnings".

Speaking of the song, Zayn said, "That's where I started and that's obviously still in there. I still like pop music, but it's about putting my own spin on it, making it me."

The song is in the key of B minor with a tempo of 90 beats per minute. The meter is common time. The harmonic progression is Bm7–G–D–F♯m7/C♯–Bm7–G–D–A/C♯. The vocals span two octaves, from D_{3} to D_{5}.

== Critical reception ==
"Dusk Till Dawn" received mixed reviews from music critics. Hugh McIntyre of Forbes magazine, who covers music charts, said the song is as "epic as it needed to be considering the two powerhouses attached." He noted that it "features powerful vocals, high notes left and right and a vocal hook that is somehow impossible to sing along to, while still being memorable." McIntyre predicted it could be a potential Grammy Award nominee for Best Pop Duo/Group Performance, but, in fact, the song's producer Greg Kurstin won Producer of the Year at the 2018 Grammy Awards for his work on "Dusk Till Dawn" along with several other songs.

Michael Cragg of The Guardian chose the song as "track of the week" and described it as "a towering piece of perfect pop." Rolling Stone's Elias Leight described the song as a "throbbing ballad" and said that the duet "leans close to her [Sia's] trademark style", adding that "Sia dials back her potent voice to harmonize better with Malik; she often handles the low end, while his singing flutters around in the falsetto range." MTV called it a "massive, cinematic duet" and concluded that it "starts off as a gorgeous, romantic mid-tempo and builds to a thrashing sing-along chorus that will echo around stadiums in no time."

Jordan Sargent, writing for Spin, said "Dusk Till Dawn" was "a step backwards" from ZAYN's previous single, "Still Got Time", commenting that the collaboration with Sia was "fairly predictable and mostly uninteresting". Alfred Soto of Billboard and The Village Voice wrote "Mumbling like a drunk staggering into bed, Zayn does nothing over Greg Kurstin’s stentorian beat except submit or yelp. The theory that he has a musical personality fades when you consider to what degree “Dusk Till Dawn” sounds as strident as any Sia single." Micha Cavaseno of The Singles Jukebox harshly criticized the song, writing "[Zayn has] proven time and time again he can't identify a lyric of actual quality, perform a memorable melody, display any actual mastery of a style. Quite frankly, the continued insistence that we should be making Zayn a star when he's had the worst offerings of his former home-base's splintering, just because the kid has a decent looking face, feels a bit deluded." Spin contributor Thomas Inskeep wrote "I absolutely hated Zayn’s duet with Taylor Swift, and this overblown, thinks-it’s-dramatic-but-it-just-sounds-silly ballad isn’t much better. Neither Zayn, nor Sia, nor producer/co-writer Greg Kurstin, bring anything worthwhile to the table."

== Commercial reception ==
As of September 2017, "Dusk Till Dawn" had sold around 58,000 digital copies in the United States according to Nielsen SoundScan. The track sold 28,561 downloads in the UK during its first week. By 5 October 2017, the song had sold around 65,000 copies in the United States. In Europe, "Dusk Till Dawn" topped the European Border Breakers chart on the week ending 27 October 2017, and held onto the number-one spot for months; it eventually dropped to number two in the week ending 26 January 2018.

== Music video ==
=== Synopsis ===
Directed by Marc Webb, the accompanying music video for "Dusk Till Dawn" premiered on YouTube on 8 September 2017, receiving over 10 million views on its first day. It is Webb's first music video in seven years. The music video finds Zayn on the run from two different groups, after he makes a sly hand-off with his mysterious accomplice played by actress Jemima Kirke. Soon after a brief confrontation, Zayn outwits the law and escapes a pair of gangsters in an intense car chase and eventually lures both parties into a trap and drives off into the sunset with Kirke. Sia does not appear in the music video. The video was inspired by the movies Casino and Goodfellas. According to ZAYN, "It’s definitely a nod to a particular era of music videos. The early '90s, around that period, people really tried to make these epic, intense movies for their videos, Michael Jackson being a great example of that. I wanted to come back and give my fans something along those lines rather than just some blasé video."

=== Reception ===
Rolling Stone's Elias Leight wrote that "Jemima Kirke and Zayn Malik are a modern day Bonnie and Clyde in the new clip" for ZAYN's song. MTV's contributor praised the dramatic visuals and wrote the "Dusk Till Dawn video is a huge step up from his previous music videos and we can’t help but wonder if this is only Part One of the story." Al Horner of Fact described the video as "a Chinatown heist mini-movie crammed into five action-packed minutes." As of October 2025, the music video has received more than 2.3 billion views on YouTube.

== Charts ==
=== Weekly charts ===
Weekly chart performance for "Dusk Till Dawn"
Chart (2017–2018)	Peak position
Australia (ARIA)	6
Austria (Ö3 Austria Top 40)	1
Belarus Airplay (Eurofest)	1
Belgium (Ultratop 50 Flanders)	5
Belgium (Ultratop 50 Wallonia)	4
Bulgaria Airplay (PROPHON)	5
Canada Hot 100 (Billboard)	5
Canada CHR/Top 40 (Billboard)	38
Canada Hot AC (Billboard)	38
Croatia International Airplay (Top lista)	1
CIS Airplay (TopHit)	1
Czech Republic Airplay (ČNS IFPI)	3
Czech Republic Singles Digital (ČNS IFPI)	1
Denmark (Tracklisten)	12
Europe Official Top 100 (Billboard)	1
Finland (Suomen virallinen lista)	4
France (SNEP)	8
Germany (GfK)	3
Greece Digital (Billboard)	1
Hungary (Rádiós Top 40)	10
Hungary (Single Top 40)	4
Hungary (Stream Top 40)	2
Ireland (IRMA)	4
Italy (FIMI)	6
Latvia (DigiTop100)	5
Lebanon Airplay (Lebanese Top 20)	1
Malaysia Streaming (RIM)	1
Mexico (Billboard Mexican Airplay)	40
Netherlands (Dutch Top 40)	3
Netherlands (Mega Top 50)	5
Netherlands (Single Top 100)	7
New Zealand (Recorded Music NZ)	8
Norway (VG-lista)	3
Philippines (Philippine Hot 100)	17
Poland Airplay (ZPAV)	1
Portugal (AFP)	2
Romania Airplay (Media Forest)	1
Russia Airplay (TopHit)	1
Scottish Singles Sales (Official Charts)	5
Slovakia Airplay (ČNS IFPI)	1
Slovakia Singles Digital (ČNS IFPI)	2
Slovenia (SloTop50)	3
Spain (Promusicae)	31
Sweden (Sverigetopplistan)	2
Switzerland (Schweizer Hitparade)	1
UK Singles (Official Charts)	5
US Billboard Hot 100	44
US Adult Pop Airplay (Billboard)	29
US Pop Airplay (Billboard)	32

=== Year-end charts ===
2017 year-end chart performance for "Dusk Till Dawn"
Chart (2017)	Position
Australia (ARIA)	67
Austria (Ö3 Austria Top 40)	29
Belgium (Ultratop Flanders)	72
Belgium (Ultratop Wallonia)	90
Brazil Streaming (Pro-Música Brasil)	192
Canada (Canadian Hot 100)	94
CIS (Tophit)	85
France (SNEP)	90
Germany (Official German Charts)	24
Hungary (Single Top 40)	31
Hungary (Stream Top 40)	23
Italy (FIMI)	85
Latvia Airplay (LaIPA)	32
Netherlands (Dutch Top 40)	25
Netherlands (Single Top 100)	68
Poland (ZPAV)	17
Portugal (AFP)	41
Romania (Airplay 100)	68
Russia (Tophit)	85
Sweden (Sverigetopplistan)	33
Switzerland (Schweizer Hitparade)	42
UK Singles (Official Charts Company)	78

2018 year-end chart performance for "Dusk Till Dawn"
Chart (2018)	Position
Belgium (Ultratop Flanders)	78
Belgium (Ultratop Wallonia)	67
Canada (Canadian Hot 100)	94
CIS (Tophit)	11
France (SNEP)	77
Germany (Official German Charts)	91
Hungary (Rádiós Top 40)	49
Hungary (Single Top 40)	31
Hungary (Stream Top 40)	60
Latvia (Latvijas Top 40)	1
Netherlands (Dutch Top 40)	76
Portugal (AFP)	68
Romania (Airplay 100)	42
Russia (Tophit)	16
Slovenia (SloTop50)	20
Sweden (Sverigetopplistan)	60
Switzerland (Schweizer Hitparade)	43

2024 year-end chart performance for "Dusk Till Dawn"
Chart (2024)	Position
Hungary (Rádiós Top 40)	54

=== Decade-end charts ===
Decade-end chart performance for "Dusk Till Dawn"
Chart (2010–2019)	Position
Russia Airplay (TopHit)	113

== Certifications ==
Region	Certification	Certified units/sales
Australia (ARIA)	4× Platinum	280,000^{‡}
Austria (IFPI Austria)	Platinum	30,000^{‡}
Belgium (BRMA)	Platinum	20,000^{‡}
Brazil (Pro-Música Brasil)	2× Diamond	500,000^{‡}
Canada (Music Canada)	4× Platinum	320,000^{‡}
Denmark (IFPI Danmark)	2× Platinum	180,000^{‡}
France (SNEP)	Diamond	233,333^{‡}
Germany (BVMI)	Platinum	400,000^{‡}
Italy (FIMI)	3× Platinum	150,000^{‡}
Mexico (AMPROFON)	4× Platinum+Gold	270,000^{‡}
New Zealand (RMNZ)	5× Platinum	150,000^{‡}
Poland (ZPAV)	Diamond	100,000^{‡}
Portugal (AFP)	Platinum	10,000^{‡}
Spain (Promusicae)	2× Platinum	120,000^{‡}
Switzerland (IFPI Switzerland)	3× Platinum	60,000^{‡}
United Kingdom (BPI)	3× Platinum	1,800,000^{‡}
United States (RIAA)	2× Platinum	2,000,000^{‡}
Streaming
Sweden (GLF)	5× Platinum	40,000,000^{†}
^{‡} Sales+streaming figures based on certification alone.^{†} Streaming-only figures based on certification alone.

== Release history ==
Region	Date	Format	Label	Ref.
Various	8 September 2017	Digital download	RCA	
United Kingdom	9 September 2017	Contemporary hit radio	RCA	
United States	19 September 2017	Contemporary hit radio	RCA	
Italy	6 October 2017	Contemporary hit radio	Sony	
