= The Konnakol Tour =

2026 concert tour by Zayn

- Tour by Zayn
- Promotional poster
- Location: Europe; North America; South America
- Associated album: Konnakol
- Start date: 23 May 2026
- End date: 14 October 2026
- No. of shows: 9
- Website: www.inzayn.com/tour

Zayn concert chronology
- Zayn: Las Vegas (2026); The Konnakol Tour (2026)

The Konnakol Tour was the second concert tour by English singer and songwriter Zayn, in support of his fifth studio album, Konnakol (2026). It commenced in London, England, on 23 May 2026, and concluded in Lima, Peru, on 14 October 2026, consisting of nine concerts.

== Background ==
Zayn announced The Konnakol Tour on 5 February 2026, supporting his fifth studio album Konnakol. The tour is produced by Live Nation. It was intended as a 31-concert global run and would have been Zayn's largest solo tour. A concert in Dublin, Ireland, was announced in March, bringing the total number of scheduled concerts to thirty-two.

The entire US leg, an Irish concert, and two British concerts were cancelled, along with a rescheduling of the concert in Manchester, England, in an announcement on 1 May 2026.

== Set list ==
The following set list was obtained from the concert held on May 23, 2026, at the The O_{2} Arena in London, England.

1. "Nusrat"
2. "sHe"
3. "Met Tonight"
4. "Birds on a Cloud"
5. "What I Am"
6. "Alienated"
7. "Dreamin"

Break - ‘Vibez’ / ‘Talk To Me’ / ‘Still Got Time’

8. "Concrete Kisses"
9. "Gates of Hell"
10. "BoRdErSz"
11. "PILLOWTALK"
12. "Lied To"
13. "Used to the Blues"
14. "Take Turns"
15. "Fatal"
16. "dRuNk"
17. "iT's YoU"

Interlude - ‘Take Turns’ / ‘Love Like This’ / ‘Trampoline (Remix)’

18. "Scripted"
19. "Sweat"

Encore

20. "Die for Me"

== Tour dates ==
List of 2026 concerts
Date (2026)	City	Country	Venue
23 May	London	England	The O_{2} Arena
24 May (Note: Originally scheduled for May 12)	Manchester	England	AO Arena
14 June	Monterrey	Mexico	Estadio Banorte
17 June	Tlajomulco de Zúñiga (Note: Labelled as Guadalajara in promotion material.)	Mexico	Arena VFG
20 June	Mexico City	Mexico	Estadio GNP Seguros
2 October	Santiago	Chile	Movistar Arena
6 October	Buenos Aires	Argentina	Movistar Arena
10 October	São Paulo	Brazil	Allianz Parque
14 October	Lima	Peru	Costa 21

=== Cancelled dates ===
List of cancelled concerts
Date (2026)	City	Country	Venue	Reason	Ref.
14 May	Dublin	Ireland	3Arena	Zayn's health issue	
16 May	Glasgow	Scotland	OVO Hydro	Zayn's health issue	
19 May	Birmingham	England	Utilita Arena Birmingham	Zayn's health issue	
19 July	Philadelphia	United States	Xfinity Mobile Arena	Zayn's health issue	
20 July	Pittsburgh	United States	PPG Paints Arena	Zayn's health issue	
23 July	Milwaukee	United States	Fiserv Forum	Zayn's health issue	
24 July	St. Paul	United States	Grand Casino Arena	Zayn's health issue	
27 July	Chicago	United States	United Center	Zayn's health issue	
28 July	Indianapolis	United States	Gainbridge Fieldhouse	Zayn's health issue	
31 July	Nashville	United States	Bridgestone Arena	Zayn's health issue	
24 August	Phoenix	United States	Mortgage Matchup Center	Zayn's health issue	
25 August	San Diego	United States	Pechanga Arena	Zayn's health issue	
28 August	Inglewood (Note: Labelled as Los Angeles in promotion material.)	United States	Intuit Dome	Zayn's health issue	
1 September	Anaheim	United States	Honda Center	Zayn's health issue	
2 September	San Francisco	United States	Chase Center	Zayn's health issue	
5 September	Seattle	United States	Climate Pledge Arena	Zayn's health issue	
7 November	Buffalo	United States	KeyBank Center	Zayn's health issue	
8 November	Detroit	United States	Little Caesars Arena	Zayn's health issue	
11 November	Washington, D.C.	United States	Capital One Arena	Zayn's health issue	
12 November	Charlotte	United States	Spectrum Center	Zayn's health issue	
15 November	Boston	United States	TD Garden	Zayn's health issue	
19 November	Orlando	United States	Kia Center	Zayn's health issue	
20 November	Miami	United States	Kaseya Center	Zayn's health issue	
