= Stairway to the Sky Tour =

2024–2025 concert tour by Zayn

- Tour by Zayn
- Promotional poster
- Location: Mexico; UK; US
- Associated album: Room Under the Stairs
- Start date: 23 November 2024
- End date: 27 March 2025
- No. of shows: 21
- Supporting acts: LAPD; Sofia Monroy; Hope Tala
- Website: www.inzayn.com/tour/

Zayn concert chronology
- Stairway to the Sky Tour (2024–2025); Zayn: Las Vegas (2026)

The Stairway to the Sky Tour was the first solo concert tour by the English singer and songwriter Zayn. It commenced in Leeds, England, on 23 November 2024 and concluded on 27 March 2025 in Mexico City, Mexico, featuring 21 shows. Zayn announced the tour in September 2024, following the release of his fourth studio album, Room Under the Stairs (2024).

== Background ==
During an appearance on The Tonight Show Starring Jimmy Fallon on 18 September 2024, Zayn announced the tour, with 11 shows across North America and Europe from October to December 2024. The following day, additional concerts in New York City, Edinburgh, London, Manchester and Leeds were announced due to demand.

On 19 October 2024, following the death of Liam Payne three days prior, Zayn announced the postponement of the concerts in the United States to January of the following year. Four days later, the rescheduled concerts were announced. The following month, he announced the two concerts in Edinburgh were rescheduled, citing "unforeseen circumstances". The 3 December concert in Newcastle, England, was cancelled twenty minutes after the singer was due on stage, with Zayn citing that his voice "just isn't there at all tonight." Seven days later, additional concerts in Washington, D.C., Los Angeles, and San Francisco were announced, due to demand. LAPD and Hope Tala were announced as supporting acts for concerts in the United States, with the latter performing at select dates.

On 27 January 2025, a concert in Mexico City was announced. A second concert in Mexico City was added the following day. On 31 January, a third concert was announced; that same night, Zayn announced his Los Angeles concert for that evening was postponed, citing vocal struggles. In March 2025, it was announced Sofia Monroy would open for Zayn during his concerts in Mexico. On 28 March, hours before the start of the concert, Zayn cancelled the show, citing health problems.

== Set list ==
This set list is from the 21 January 2025 concert in Washington, D.C.

1. "My Woman"
2. "Birds on a Cloud"
3. "Dreamin"
4. "Lied To"
5. "In the Bag"
6. "Ignorance Ain't Bliss"
7. "Scripted"
8. "Sweat"
9. "Bordersz"
10. "It's You"
11. "Shoot at Will"
12. "Last Request"
13. "Pillowtalk"
14. "Concrete Kisses"
15. "What I Am"
16. "Alienated"
17. "Gates of Hell"
18. "Stardust"

=== Notes ===
- During the 25 and 27 March 2025 concerts in Mexico City, Zayn opened the show with "Night Changes".

== Tour dates ==
List of 2024 concerts
Date (2024)	City	Country	Venue
23 November	Leeds	England	O_{2} Academy Leeds
24 November	Manchester	England	O_{2} Apollo Manchester
26 November	London	England	Eventim Apollo
27 November	London	England	Eventim Apollo
29 November	Wolverhampton	England	Civic Hall
30 November	Manchester	England	O_{2} Apollo Manchester
2 December	Leeds	England	O_{2} Academy Leeds
4 December	Manchester	England	O_{2} Apollo Manchester
8 December (Note: The 8 and 9 December 2024 concerts in Edinburgh, Scotland, were originally scheduled for 20 and 21 November 2024 respectively, but were rescheduled due to "unforeseen circumstances".)	Edinburgh	Scotland	O_{2} Academy Edinburgh
9 December	Edinburgh	Scotland	O_{2} Academy Edinburgh

List of 2025 concerts (Note: Attributed to multiple sources:)
Date (2025)	City	Country	Venue	Supporting acts
21 January (Note: The concert in Washington D.C. on 21 January 2025 was previously scheduled for 30 October 2024.)	Washington, D.C.	United States	The Anthem	LAPD
22 January	Washington, D.C.	United States	The Anthem	LAPD
24 January (Note: The concert in New York City on 24 January 2025 was previously scheduled for 2 November 2024.)	New York City	United States	Hammerstein Ballroom	LAPD; Hope Tala
25 January (Note: The concert in New York City on 25 January 2025 was previously scheduled for 3 November 2024.)	New York City	United States	Hammerstein Ballroom	LAPD; Hope Tala
28 January (Note: The concert in Los Angeles on 28 January 2025 was previously scheduled for 27 October 2024.)	Los Angeles	United States	Shrine Auditorium	LAPD; Hope Tala
29 January (Note: The concert in Los Angeles on 29 January 2025 was previously scheduled for 28 October 2024.)	Los Angeles	United States	Shrine Auditorium	LAPD; Hope Tala
1 February (Note: The concert in Paradise on 1 February 2025 was previously scheduled for 25 October 2024.)	Paradise (Note: Labelled as Las Vegas in promotion material.)	United States	Chelsea Ballroom	LAPD
3 February (Note: The concert in San Francisco on 3 February 2025 was previously scheduled for 23 October 2024.)	San Francisco	United States	Bill Graham Civic Auditorium	LAPD; Hope Tala
4 February	San Francisco	United States	Bill Graham Civic Auditorium	LAPD
25 March	Mexico City	Mexico	Palacio de los Deportes	Sofía Monroy
27 March	Mexico City	Mexico	Palacio de los Deportes	Sofía Monroy

=== Cancelled shows ===
List of cancelled concerts
Date	City	Country	Venue	Reason	Ref.
3 December 2024	Newcastle	England	O_{2} City Hall	Vocal problems	
31 January 2025	Los Angeles	United States	Shrine Auditorium	Unforeseen circumstances (Note: In a statement on social media, Zayn cited his voice "was really struggling", when announcing the postponement.)	
28 March 2025	Mexico City	Mexico	Palacio de los Deportes	Food poisoning	

== Personnel ==
Adapted from an article published by The Independent.

- Steph "Baby Bulldog" Barker – drums
- Tahira Clayton – backing vocalist
- Rebecca Havalind – acoustic guitar
- Tina Hizon – keyboard
- Ryan Madora – bass guitar
- Molly Miller – electric guitar
- Lisa Ramey – backing vocalist
