= Welcome to The Captain =

American television series

- Genre: Sitcom
- Created by: John Hamburg
- Starring: Fran Kranz; Chris Klein; Joanna Garcia; Al Madrigal; Valerie Azlynn; Raquel Welch; Jeffrey Tambor
- Narrated by: Al Madrigal
- Composer: Tree Adams
- Country of origin: United States
- Original language: English
- No. of seasons: 1
- No. of episodes: 5

Production
- Executive producers: John Hamburg; Ted Cohen; Andrew Reich
- Camera setup: Single-camera
- Running time: 30 minutes
- Production companies: Bernard Gayle Productions; CBS Paramount Network Television

Original release
- Network: CBS
- Release: February 4 – March 3, 2008

Welcome to The Captain (previously known as The Captain) is an American sitcom television series created, executive produced and directed by John Hamburg. Andrew Reich and Ted Cohen also serve as executive producers. The show is about a young writer (Fran Kranz) whose life changes when he moves into a legendary old Hollywood apartment building.

Produced by CBS Paramount Network Television and John & Anders, the series was greenlit and given a six-episode order in June 2007.

Welcome to The Captain premiered on February 4, 2008, airing on CBS in the United States and CTV in Canada. On CBS it was a mid-season replacement for The Big Bang Theory, but the show was halted after its fifth episode aired due to poor ratings. Fran Kranz eventually signed on to the upcoming Fox series Dollhouse, effectively canceling the CBS sitcom. On May 14, 2008, the series was officially canceled.

== Cast ==
- Fran Kranz as Joshua "Josh" Flug
- Chris Klein as Marty Tanner
- Joanna Garcia as Hope
- Al Madrigal as Jesus
- Valerie Azlynn as Astrid
- Raquel Welch as Charlene Van Ark
- Jeffrey Tambor as Saul Fish

=== Guest stars ===
- Michael Weston as Brad (Episode 2)
- Christine Woods as Claire (Episode 2)
- Joey Fatone as himself (Episode 3)
- Shiri Appleby as Heather (Episode 4)
- Nicole Lyn as Melanie (Episode 4)

== Episodes ==
No.	Title	Directed by	Written by	Original release date	Prod. code
1	"Pilot"	John Hamburg	John Hamburg	February 4, 2008	101
Josh Flug, a one-time Hollywood hot shot, is persuaded by his friend, Marty, to move into the El Capitan apartment building, dubbed "The Captain" by its residents. With its eccentric group of tenants, he realizes this is the fresh start he needs.
2	"Weekend at Saul's"	Mark Mylod	Andrew Reich & Ted Cohen	February 11, 2008	102
When Josh invites Hope to stay at his apartment for the weekend, Uncle Saul convinces him that it is a bad move, and persuades him to stay at his weekend retreat in order to make her jealous.
3	"The Letter"	John Hamburg	John Hamburg	February 18, 2008	103
With help from Jesus and Uncle Saul, Josh tries to plan the perfect dinner for Hope. Meanwhile, Marty shacks up with Josh after being kicked out of his apartment by his live-in girlfriend.
4	"The Wrecking Crew"	Beth McCarthy-Miller	Sherry Bilsing & Ellen Plummer	February 25, 2008	104
Marty and Josh are joined by Uncle Saul and Jesus for a guys' night out, while Hope tries to make girlfriends in the building so she is not alone on a Friday night.
5	"Mr. Big Meeting"	John Hamburg	Tucker Cawley	March 3, 2008	105
After Marty lands Josh a meeting with the president of Paramount, Uncle Saul insists on helping him with his pitch. Also, while Jesus is busy checking the building's smoke detectors, Astrid stands in for him at the front desk.

== U.S. Nielsen Ratings ==
=== Weekly ===
#	Episode	Air Date	Timeslot	Households (Rating/Share)	18-49 (Rating/Share)	Viewers (m)	Weekly Rank (#)
1	"Pilot"	February 4, 2008	8:30 p.m.	5.1/8	2.7/7	8.14	35
2	"Weekend at Saul's"	February 11, 2008	8:30 p.m.	4.5/7	2.6/7	7.13	30
3	"The Letter"	February 18, 2008	8:30 p.m.	3.4/5	2.0/5	5.45	42
4	"The Wrecking Crew"	February 25, 2008	8:30 p.m.	3.1/5	1.8/5	5.34	N/A
5	"Mr. Big Meeting"	March 3, 2008	8:30 p.m.	3.6/5	1.8/5	5.63	59

=== Seasonal ===
Season	Time slot	Premiere	Finale	TV Season	Rank	Viewers (millions)
1	Monday 8:30 p.m.	February 4, 2008	March 3, 2008	2007-2008	#112	6.3
