= Dustin Bowie =

American songwriter, singer

Dustin Adrian Bowie
- Born: Alabama, United States
- Other name: DAB
- Musical career
- Genres: R&B; gospel; pop; hip hop
- Occupations: Songwriter; singer

Dustin Bowie is a Grammy-nominated American songwriter and singer, best known for co-writing Beyoncé's "Virgo’s Groove" from her 2022 album Renaissance, Lecrae's "All I Need Is You", as well as "Better" from ZAYN's 2021 album Nobody Is Listening, among others.

== Songwriting and production credits ==
Credits are courtesy of Discogs, Tidal, Apple Music, and AllMusic.

Title	Year	Artist	Album
"Outsiders"	2014	Lecrae	Anomaly
"All I Need Is You"	2014	Lecrae	Anomaly
"Now I Know"	2015	Andy Mineo	Uncomfortable
"Make Me a Believer" (Featuring Mac Powell)	2015	Andy Mineo	Uncomfortable
"Basta"	2015	Edurne	Adrenalina
"When It's Real"	2018	Raheem DeVaughn	Decade Of A Love King
"Better"	2020	Zayn Malik	Nobody Is Listening
"Forfeit" (Featuring Lucky Daye)	2020	Kiana Ledé	Kiki
"Can You Blame Me" (Featuring Lucky Daye)	2020	Kehlani	It Was Good Until It Wasn't
"Que Wea"	2021	Paloma Mami	Sueños De Dalí
"Feed The Fire" (Featuring Lucky Daye)	2021	SG Lewis	Times
"Good Luck"	2021	NAO	And Then Life Was Beautiful
"Dream" (Featuring Lucky Daye)	2021	Queen Naija	Missunderstood
"Virgo’s Groove"	2022	Beyoncé	Renaissance
"Too Much" (Featuring Lucky Daye)	2022	Mark Ronson	Non-album single
"Compassion" (Featuring Chiiild)	2022	Lucky Daye	Candydrip (Deluxe Edition)
"These Signs"	2022	Lucky Daye	Candydrip (Deluxe Edition)
"Apply Pressure"	2022	Lucky Daye	Candydrip (Deluxe Edition)
"Hericane"	2024	Lucky Daye	Algorithm
"Soft"	2024	Lucky Daye	Algorithm
"Pin"	2024	Lucky Daye	Algorithm
"Think Different"	2024	Lucky Daye	Algorithm
"Breakin' the Bank"	2024	Lucky Daye	Algorithm
"Diamonds in Teal"	2024	Lucky Daye	Algorithm

== Awards and nominations ==
Year	Ceremony	Award	Result	Ref
2015	46th GMA Dove Awards	Rap/Hip-Hop Song of the Year (All I Need Is You)	Won	
2023	65th Annual Grammy Awards	Grammy Award for Album of the Year (Renaissance)	Nominated	

== Guest appearances ==
List of guest appearances, with other performing artists, showing year released and album name
Title	Year	Other performer(s)	Album
"Expect Us"	2016	Canon	Loose Canon Vol. 3
