= All About the Washingtons =

- Genre: Comedy; Sitcom
- Created by: Jeremy Bronson
- Starring: Joseph "Rev Run" Simmons; Justine Simmons; Kiana Ledé; Nathan Anderson; Leah Rose Randall; Maceo Smedley
- Composer: Frank Ciampi
- Country of origin: United States
- Original language: English
- No. of seasons: 1
- No. of episodes: 10

Production
- Executive producers: Joseph "Rev Run" Simmons; Justine Simmons; Michael Lehman; Darryl Frank; Justin Falvey; Jeremy Bronson; Andrew Reich
- Producer: Mark Grossan
- Cinematography: Christian La Fountaine; Joseph W. Calloway
- Editor: Skip Collector
- Camera setup: Multi-camera
- Running time: 22–26 minutes
- Production companies: Simmons/Lehman Productions; Amblin Television; ABC Signature

Original release
- Network: Netflix
- Release: August 10, 2018

All About the Washingtons is an American comedy television series created by Jeremy Bronson that premiered on August 10, 2018, on Netflix. The series is executive produced by Bronson alongside showrunner Andrew Reich and stars Joseph "Rev Run" Simmons, Justine Simmons, and Kiana Ledé. In October 2018, it was announced that Netflix had canceled the series after one season.

== Premise ==
All About the Washingtons follows husband and wife Joey and Justine Washington as they raise their family. The series begins "after Joey decides to retire from a long career as legendary hip-hop royalty, his wife Justine, takes advantage of the opportunity to pursue a career of her own now that Joey is available to focus on raising the kids and keeping the house in order."

== Cast and characters ==
=== Main ===
- Joseph "Rev Run" Simmons as Joey Washington, a hip-hop artist who decides to retire and become a stay-at-home father.
- Justine Simmons as Justine Washington, a former housewife who, upon the announcement of her husband's retirement, decides to fulfill her lifelong ambition of becoming an entrepreneur.
- Kiana Ledé as Veronica Washington, Joey's and Justine's eldest daughter who is a college student.
- Nathan Anderson as Wesley Washington, Joey's and Justine's older son who desires a music career like his father's.
- Leah Rose Randall as Skyler Washington, Joey's and Justine's younger daughter who is a gifted student.
- Maceo Smedley as Daevon Washington, Joey's and Justine's youngest son. His middle name is Gilbert as revealed in the episode "Yo! Bum Rush the Secret Show".

=== Recurring ===
- Quincy Fouse as Malik, Veronica's boyfriend.
- DJ Ruckus as himself
- Arsenio Hall as himself
- Lawrence Saint-Victor as Blake, the father of one of Veronica's students who she has a crush on.

=== Guest ===
- Tim Meadows as himself ("Sip Stop Hooray")
- Daymond John as himself ("Sip Stop Hooray")
- Aubrey Cleland as Jade ("They Call Me Too Nice")
- Kira Kosarin as Mia ("Yo! Bum Rush The Secret Show")
- Suzy Nakamura as Mrs. Chadwick ("Papa Said Log You Out")
- Trinitee Stokes as Brianna ("Papa Said Log You Out")
- Deon Cole as Darnell Bell ("You Gots the Chills")

== Episodes ==
No.	Title	Directed by	Written by	Original release date
1	"Sip Stop Hooray"	Don Scardino	Story by : Jeremy Bronson; Teleplay by : Jeremy Bronson & Andrew Reich	August 10, 2018
2	"U Can't Crash This"	Don Scardino	Jason Venokur	August 10, 2018
3	"They Call Me Too Nice"	Don Scardino	Alyson Fouse	August 10, 2018
4	"Yo! Bum Rush the Secret Show"	Don Scardino	Matthew Claybrooks	August 10, 2018
5	"Please Hamper, Don't Hurt 'Em"	Kimberly McCullough	Stephnie Weir	August 10, 2018
6	"Papa Said Log You Out"	Kimberly McCullough	Frank Pines	August 10, 2018
7	"You Gots the Chills"	Linda Mendoza	Andrew Reich	August 10, 2018
8	"Follow the Leaker"	Phill Lewis	Marlena Rodriguez	August 10, 2018
9	"Pranksta's Paradise"	Linda Mendoza	Jason Venokur	August 10, 2018
10	"Snow Diggity"	Linda Mendoza	Sebastian Jones	August 10, 2018

== Production ==
=== Development ===
On October 24, 2016, it was announced that ABC had given the production a put pilot commitment with a financial penalty attached if the network failed to produce a pilot. The pilot episode was written by Jeremy Bronson with veteran comedy writer-producer Jhoni Marchinko supervising. Executive producers were set to include Bronson and Marchinko alongside Joseph "Rev Run" Simmons, Justine Simmons, Michael Lehman, Darryl Frank, and Justin Falvey. Production companies involved with the project were expected to include Amblin Television and ABC Studios. On March 17, 2017, following ABC's decision not to move forward with a pilot, it was reported that Amblin Television and ABC Studios had decided to use the penalty money received from ABC to finance a pilot presentation of the production. A truncated version of the pilot script was expected to be used and the episode was set to be filmed at the beginning of April 2017, on the set of ABC Studios' Black-ish, with Don Scardino directing.

On November 17, 2017, it was announced that Netflix had given the production a straight-to-series order for a first season consisting of ten episodes. It was further reported that the series would be produced by ABC Studios' cable/digital division ABC Signature. On June 14, 2018, it was reported that the series, now titled All About The Washingtons, would premiere on August 10, 2018. Additionally, it was announced that Andrew Reich serve as showrunner and an executive producer for the series. On October 18, 2018, it was announced that Netflix had canceled the series after one season.

=== Casting ===
Alongside the announcement of the put pilot commitment, it was confirmed that the series would star Joseph "Rev Run" Simmons and Justine Simmons. Alongside the announcement of the series' premiere, it was reported that the children in the show would be portrayed by Kiana Ledé, Nathan Anderson, Leah Rose Randall, and Maceo Smedley.

=== Filming ===
Principal photography for the series was expected to begin in January 2018.

== Release ==
=== Marketing ===
On July 18, 2018, the official trailer for the series was released.

=== Premiere ===
On August 8, 2018, a screening of the series was held at Madera Kitchen & Bar in Los Angeles, California.

== Reception ==
The series was met with a negative response from critics upon its premiere. On the review aggregation website Rotten Tomatoes, the series holds a 40% approval rating, with an average rating of 4.07 out of 10 based on 5 reviews.

In an unfavorable review, The Hollywood Reporter's Daniel Fienberg commented that the series proves that reality stars do not necessarily possess the talent necessary to act saying, "the show is built exclusively on the idea that people who are funny in reality can be made to be fictionally funny. In this case, they cannot." In another adverse critique, Now's Rachna Raj Kaur compared the series unfavorably to the Simmons' real-life personas saying, "Rev Run's bold presence in pop-culture has spanned four decades, but his new family sitcom, All About The Washingtons falls flat. What is arguably one of hip-hop's longest standing royal families, has been compressed to one shallow dimension in this autobiographical sitcom." In a further unfriendly assessment, Paste's Jacob Oller gave the series a grade of 4.2 out of 10 and commented, "All About the Washingtons is simply too facile to be funny and too invested in testing the Simmons with scripted material to be charming. The leads are dull and the lines they shout are either monotonous dad jokes, simple plot points, or loving reconciliations (after no major drama has occurred)."
