= Layers (Royce da 5'9" album) =

Studio album by Royce da 5'9"
- Released: April 15, 2016
- Recorded: 2015
- Genre: Hip hop
- Length: 63:02
- Label: Bad Half
- Producer: Royce da 5'9" (also exec.); Mr. Porter (also exec.); AntMan Wonder; DJ Khalil; DJ Pain 1; Daniel Smith; Epikh; G Koop; J. Rhodes; Jake One; Nottz; S1

Royce da 5'9" chronology
PRhyme (2014)	Layers (2016)	PRhyme 2 (2018)

Singles from Layers
- 1. "Tabernacle" Released: March 3, 2016; 2. "Layers" Released: April 2, 2016

Layers is the sixth studio album by American rapper Royce da 5'9". The album was released on April 15, 2016, by Bad Half Entertainment.

== Critical reception ==
Professional ratings
Aggregate scores
Source	Rating
Metacritic	77/100
Review scores
Source	Rating
AllMusic	3.5/5 stars
Exclaim!	7/10
HipHopDX	4.2/5
Pitchfork Media	6.4/10
PopMatters	8/10 stars
XXL	(XL)

Layers received generally positive reviews from music critics. At Metacritic, which assigns a normalized rating out of 100 to reviews from mainstream critics, the album received an average score of 77 based on 6 reviews, which indicates "generally favorable reviews".

== Commercial performance ==
In the United States, the album debuted at number 22 on the Billboard 200, selling 16,749 copies in its first week. It was the eleventh best-selling album of the week. Layers was the first Royce's solo album to debut at number one on the Billboard Top R&B/Hip-Hop Albums. The album was also streamed 1.7 million times in the first week. In its second week the album fell to number 187 on the Billboard 200 chart.

== Track listing ==
No.	Title	Producer(s)	Length
1.	"Tabernacle"	S1; J. Rhodes	5:19
2.	"Pray"	Mr. Porter; G Koop	4:05
3.	"Hard"	AntMan Wonder	5:51
4.	"Startercoat"	Mr. Porter	3:36
5.	"Wait"	Jake One	3:12
6.	"Shine (Skit)"		0:27
7.	"Shine"	Nottz	5:18
8.	"Lincoln (Skit)"		1:57
9.	"Flesh"	DJ Khalil	3:31
10.	"Hello (Skit)" (featuring Melanie Rutherford)	Daniel Smith	1:29
11.	"Misses" (featuring K. Young)	DJ Khalil	4:09
12.	"Dope!" (featuring Loren W. Oden)	DJ Pain 1	4:03
13.	"America"	S1; Epikh	4:23
14.	"Layers" (featuring Pusha T and Rick Ross)	Mr. Porter	4:20
15.	"Quiet" (featuring Tiara and Mr. Porter)	Mr. Porter	4:07
16.	"Gottaknow"	S1; Epikh	3:55
17.	"Off"	Mr. Porter	3:20
Total length:			63:02

== Charts ==
Chart (2016)	Peak position
US Billboard 200	22
US Independent Albums (Billboard)	4
US Top R&B/Hip-Hop Albums (Billboard)	1
