= Radio Silence (Talib Kweli album) =

Studio album by Talib Kweli
- Released: November 17, 2017
- Genre: Hip-hop
- Length: 47:29
- Label: Javotti Media; 3D
- Producer: Abjo; J. LBS; J. Rhodes; Kaytranada; Lord Quest; Mr. Carmack; Oh No; Quincy Tones; Robert Glasper; Samuel Truth; the Alchemist

Talib Kweli chronology
Fuck the Money (2015)	Radio Silence (2017)	Gotham (2021)

Professional ratings
Aggregate scores
Source	Rating
Metacritic	78/100
Review scores
Source	Rating
AllMusic	4/5 stars
Exclaim!	8/10
HipHopDX	4/5
laut.de	4/5 stars
Noisey	(2-star Honorable Mention)
Pitchfork	6.7/10
PopMatters	7/10
XXL	4/5

Radio Silence is the eighth solo studio album by American rapper Talib Kweli. It was released on November 17, 2017, through Javotti Media, marking his fifth album for the label. The album was produced by J. Rhodes, Abjo, J. LBS, Kaytranada, Lord Quest, Mr. Carmack, Oh No, Quincy Tones, Robert Glasper, Samuel Truth, and the Alchemist. It features guest appearances from Yummy Bingham, Amber Coffman, Anderson .Paak, Bilal, BJ the Chicago Kid, Datcha, Jay Electronica, Myka 9, Rick Ross, Robert Glasper, and Waka Flocka Flame.

The album was preceded by four promotional audio releases: "Let It Roll", "She's My Hero", "Heads Up Eyes Open" featuring Rick Ross and Yummy Bingham, and "Traveling Light" featuring Anderson .Paak. "Heads Up Eyes Open" saw a video release prior to the album's release date while the video for "Traveling Light" was released on November 17.

== Background ==
Talib Kweli first publicly mentioned that he was working on Radio Silence in 2016. Since the announcement, Talib released Fuck the Money and The Seven EP.

== Track listing ==
No.	Title	Writer(s)	Producer(s)	Length
1.	"The Magic Hour"	Talib Kweli Greene; Daniel Alan Maman	The Alchemist	2:20
2.	"Traveling Light" (featuring Anderson .Paak)	Greene; Brandon Paak; Kevin Celestin	Kaytranada	4:31
3.	"All of Us" (featuring Jay Electronica and Yummy Bingham)	Greene; Timothy E. Thedford; Elizabeth Bingham; Samuel Truth; Gabriela Anders	Samuel Truth	5:40
4.	"She's My Hero"	Greene; Michael Jackson	Oh No	2:54
5.	"Chips" (featuring Waka Flocka Flame)	Greene; Juaquin Malphurs; Justin Louis Rhodes; Chaz Van Queen	J. Rhodes	3:28
6.	"Knockturnal"	Greene; Jason Kevin Pounds	J. Lbs	4:03
7.	"Radio Silence" (featuring Amber Coffman and Myka 9)	Greene; Amber Coffman; Michael Troy; Aaron Carmack; Aaron Nash	Mr. Carmack; Abjo	5:48
8.	"The One I Love" (featuring BJ the Chicago Kid)	Greene; Bryan Sledge; Sean Thomas McCaffrey; Sampha Sisay	Quincey Tones	5:07
9.	"Head Up Eyes Open" (featuring Rick Ross and Yummy Bingham)	Greene; William Roberts; Bingham; Rhodes	J. Rhodes	4:23
10.	"Let It Roll"	Greene; Jeffrey Nuamah; Benard Ighner	Lord Quest	2:53
11.	"Write at Home" (featuring Datcha, Bilal and Robert Glasper)	Greene; Datcha Magerano; Robert Andre Glasper	Robert Glasper	6:22
Total length:				47:29

== Charts ==
Chart (2017)	Peak position
US Independent Albums (Billboard)	26
