= Stardust (Zayn song) =

2024 single by Zayn

Single by Zayn

from the album Room Under the Stairs
- Released: 17 May 2024
- Genre: Folk-pop
- Length: 3:52
- Label: Mercury; Republic
- Songwriters: Gian Stone; James Ghaleb; Sean Douglas; Casey Smith; Zayn Malik
- Producers: Dave Cobb; Stone; Ghaleb

Zayn singles chronology
"Alienated" (2024)	"Stardust" (2024)	"Eyes Closed" (2025)

Music video
- "Stardust" on YouTube

"Stardust" is a song by English singer-songwriter Zayn. It was released on 17 May 2024 through Mercury and Republic Records as the third and final single from his fourth studio album, Room Under the Stairs, along with the release of the album. A folk-pop song that was released alongside the official music video, it was written by Gian Stone, James Ghaleb, Sean Douglas, Casey Smith, with the former two producing it alongside Dave Cobb.

== Background ==
Zayn described the track as "the love on the album." He also added, "stardust is about the idea of love and the feeling that love gives you." He released a teaser to the track via social media on 7 May 2024, before it was released as the album's third single. Zayn included the song in his Stairway to the Sky Tour concert setlist as a tribute to his friend and ex bandmate Liam Payne.

== Composition and lyrics ==
The "introspective" song is "set to soft-sounding synths, snare drums and acoustic guitars" that shows Zayn sees himself as a "hopeless romantic". Described as "a cheesy ode to falling head over heels", he sings on the chorus: "Feels like stardust / Floatin' all around us / Shootin' right across the big black sky". felt that the song "is easily the highlight" of the album "and one that will lend itself perfectly to concert sing-a-longs, in time for the first live shows of his solo career" even though "the lyrics of the chorus could feel cliche", but it works because "there is such a dreamlike quality that it hardly matters".

== Critical reception ==
"Stardust" was met with positive reviews from music critics. Jason Lipshutz of Billboard ranked the song as the best track from Room Under the Stairs stating, "Zayn operates in a different sound than he's used to, but relies on his well-worn vocal warmth and previous iterations of fluttery romance. 'Stardust' benefits from a sense of tempo and nicely crafted hooks, but Zayn provides the song with a personality, and turns it into a career highlight." Steffanee Wang of Nylon praised Zayn's falsetto on the track. Bee Delores of Countrypolitan remarked, "His voice has never sounded so sweet, as he oscillates from a whisper to his upper register. In between, he caresses the lyrics and lets you feel every syllable fall from the sky." Larisha Paul of Rolling Stone said the song, "evokes the same breezy feeling — though it channels a flower field more than a beach."

== Music video ==
The music video for "Stardust" premiered on 17 May 2024. Directed by Frank and Ivanna Borin, the video finds Zayn as a celestial being trapped on Earth and is guided by falling stars as he explores a "magic-tinged lake" and a forest.

== Charts ==
Chart performance for "Stardust"
Chart (2024)	Peak position
New Zealand Hot Singles (RMNZ)	15
UK Asian Music (OCC)	1
UK British Asian Chart (OCC)	1
US Hot Rock & Alternative Songs (Billboard)	34
