= Kiki (album) =

Studio album by Kiana Ledé
- Released: April 3, 2020
- Genre: R&B
- Length: 49:36 (standard version); 71:39 (deluxe version)
- Label: The Heavy Group, Republic
- Producer: Rice n Peas; Derrick Milano; Roark Bailey; Archer; Cam Griffin; Anton Göransson; Mr. Franks; Los Hendrix; Nascent; The Roommates; OG Parker; Soulful; Kreative Villains; Mike Crook; Cool & Dre; Jeffrey "Caspa" Cross; Jeremy Skaller

Kiana Ledé chronology
Myself (2019)	Kiki (2020)	Grudges (2023)

Alternate cover
- Deluxe edition cover

Singles from Kiki
- 1. "Mad at Me" Released: January 30, 2020; 2. "Forfeit" Released: March 13, 2020; 3. "Chocolate" Released: April 16, 2020

Kiki is the debut album by American singer Kiana Ledé, released April 3, 2020, by the Heavy Group and Republic Records. The album was followed by an EP of acoustic versions of songs from the album which was released June 26, and a deluxe edition released October 23.

The release date was also the artist's 23rd birthday. The album's cover art features Ledé posed in front of her childhood home, and the title is taken from her childhood nickname.

== Reception ==
Okayplayer's Robyn Mowatt called Kiki "a stellar debut album fit for the rising artist, especially since the release is equipped with an effective, stripped-down sound produced by Mike Woods", and said that "the entire album sum[s] up Kiana's artistic journey and point to how her sound is ever-evolving." New Wave Magazine praised Ledé's lyricism as "manag[ing] to keep her audiences' ears pricked" and wrote that "Ultimately, Kiki is not just another R&B album. Ledé exhibits a growing command of her definitive sound, through the release of an album that feels authentic and unapologetically empowering." Clash's Robin Murray wrote that Kiki "certainly shines", "is a record that exudes joy", and is a "careful blend of light and shade illuminating club bumpers with a depth of emotion".

About the deluxe version of the album, Beyond the Stage's Nick Browne wrote that "Ledé gave her debut album an extra burst of life with the addition of new tracks on the deluxe version", that the "vibes are truly immaculate and these songs will be on replay after the first listen", and that the "singer showcases her roots in her signature R&B sound with both beautiful lyrics and synths."

== Track listing ==
=== Standard edition ===
Kiki
No.	Title	Writer(s)	Producer(s)	Length
1.	"Cancelled"	Derrick Milano; Kevin White; Kiana Ledé; Michael "Boston" McCall; Mike Woods; Patrick McManus; Reese Hinton; Roark Bailey	Rice n Peas; Milano; Bailey	2:47
2.	"Movin"	Archer; Chelsea Lena; Frederic Alexander Brewer; Ledé; Pierre Jamerson	Archer	3:06
3.	"Mad at Me"	Amanda Reifer; Andre Benjamin; Antwan Patton; Ashley Leone; White; Ledé; Woods; Patrick Leroy Brown; Raymon Ameer Murray; Rico R. Wade	Rice n Peas	2:15
4.	"Chocolate" (featuring Ari Lennox)	Archer; Lennox; Lena; Ledé; Jamerson	Archer	3:06
5.	"Forfeit" (featuring Lucky Daye)	David Debrandon Brown; Milano; Dustin Bowie; White; Ledé; McCall; Woods; McManus; Hinton; Bailey	Rice n Peas; Bailey	4:02
6.	"Second Chances" (featuring 6lack)	Cam Griffin; Milano; White; Ledé; McCall; Woods; Hinton; Ricardo Valdez Valentine; Bailey	Rice n Peas; Griffin; Milano; Bailey	3:12
7.	"Crazy"	Milano; White; Ledé; McCall; Woods; McManus; Hinton; Bailey	Rice n Peas; Milano; Bailey	2:16
8.	"Plenty More"	Amanda Atoui; Avital Margulies; Jose Deverze; White; Ledé; McCall; Woods; McManus	Rice n Peas	3:29
9.	"Skiterlude"	Archer; Milano; White; Ledé; Woods; McManus; Hinton; Bailey	Archer; Milano; Rice n Peas; Bailey	1:49
10.	"Labels" (featuring Moneybagg Yo and Bia)	Bianca Landrau; Demario Dewayne White Jr.; Milano; James Mtume; White; Ledé; McCall; Woods; McManus; Hinton; Bailey	Rice n Peas; Bailey	2:36
11.	"Honest"	Milano; White; Ledé; McCall; Woods; Hinton; Bailey	Rice n Peas; Bailey	2:38
12.	"Feel a Way"	Milano; White; Ledé; McCall; Woods; McManus; Hinton; Bailey	Rice n Peas; Milano; Bailey	2:48
13.	"Good Girl" (featuring Col3trane)	Griffin; Cole Basta; Milano; White; Ledé; Woods; Hinton; Bailey	Rice n Peas; Griffin; Bailey	3:14
14.	"Attention"	Anton Goransson; Isabella Sjostrand; Ledé; Woods; Steven Franks; Tommy Brown	Göransson; Ledé; Woods; Mr. Franks	3:22
15.	"Separation" (featuring Arin Ray)	Archer; Ray; Milano; White; Ledé; Woods; McManus; Hinton; Bailey	Archer; Rice n Peas; Bailey	2:38
16.	"Protection"	White; Ledé; Mayila Jones; McCall; Woods; McManus	Rice n Peas	3:53
17.	"No Takebacks"	Milano; White; Ledé; McCall; Woods; McManus; Hinton; Bailey	Rice n Peas; Bailey	2:25
Total length:				49:36

=== Deluxe version ===
The deluxe version of the album adds six songs to the start of the track list, designated as disc one, and one song to the end of the standard track list which is designated as disc two.

Kiki (Deluxe)
No.	Title	Writer(s)	Producer(s)	Length
1.	"Ladylike"	Leone; Ivory Scott; Ledé	Los Hendrix; Woods; Nascent	3:22
2.	"Chocolate" (remix featuring Ari Lennox)	Archer; Lennox; Lena; Cordae; Ledé; McCall; Woods; Jamerson	Rice n Peas	3:19
3.	"Must Be Mine" (featuring Ant Clemons)	"Pop" Wansel; Clemons; Lena; Ledé; PnB Rock; The Roommates	The Roommates	2:32
4.	"Amazing"	Reifer; Anthony Bowers Jr; Leone; Joshua Parker; Ledé	OG Parker; Soulful	3:18
5.	"Only Fan" (featuring Jacquees)	Alex Boateng; Brandon Black; Darius Jenkins; Edgar Cutino; Emmanuel Boateng; Ledé	Kreative Villains	3:41
6.	"None for You"	Benjamin Shapiro; Feli Ferraro; Ledé	Mike Crook	2:40
18.	"Youth" (bonus track with Gary Clark Jr.)	Ledé; Xander850	Cool & Dre; Jeffrey "Caspa" Cross; Jeremy Skaller	3:11
Total length:				71:39

=== Notes ===
All track names stylized with a period at the end, such as "Second Chances."

=== Samples ===
- "Mad at Me" contains elements of "So Fresh, So Clean", written by Andre Benjamin, Antwan Patton and David Sheats.
- "Labels" contains elements from "Juicy Fruit", written by James Mtume.
- "Honest" contains elements from "Have You Ever?", written by Diane Warren and performed by Brandy Norwood.
- "Cancelled" contains elements of a TikTok called "I Am a Single Queen" performed by Jasmine Orlando, and "Long Red" written by Leslie West, Felix Pappalardi, John Ventura and Norman Landsberg.

== Charts ==
Chart performance for Kiki
Chart	Peak position
Canadian Albums (Billboard)	83
US Billboard 200	30
US Top R&B/Hip-Hop Albums (Billboard)	19
US Top R&B Albums (Billboard)	7
