= J. Rhodes =

American record producer, composer, and filmmaker

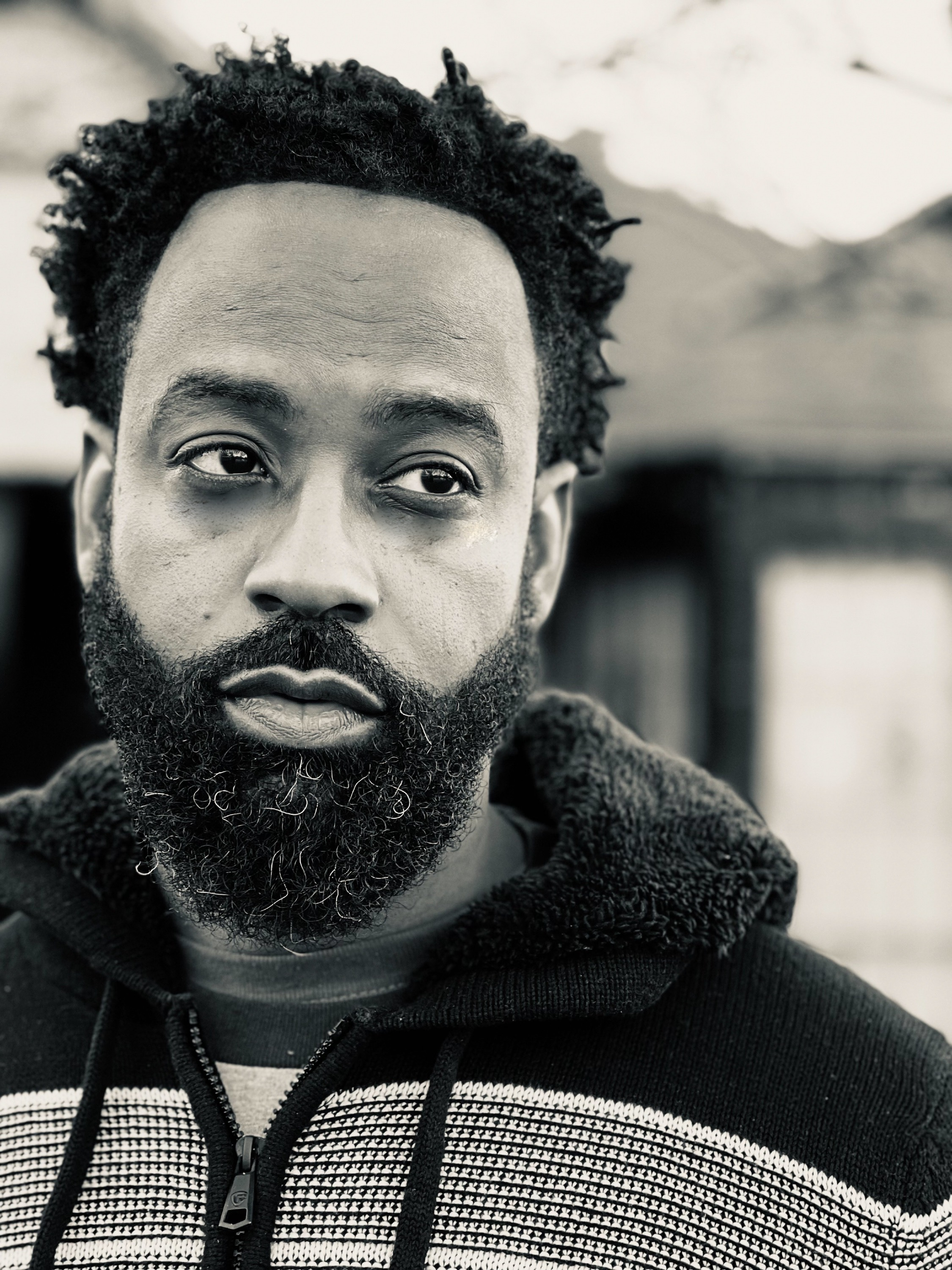

Background information
- Born: Justin Rhodes; Dallas, Texas, U.S.
- Education: University of North Texas
- Genres: Rap; hip hop; soul music
- Occupations: Record producer; composer; filmmaker; artist
- Years active: 2010–present
- Label: Vintage Rhodes Productions
- Website: thesebeatsaintfree.com

J. Rhodes is a music producer, composer, filmmaker, artist, author, public speaker, and educator. He co-wrote and produced, Welcome to America, recorded by Lecrae, which charted at #16 on Billboard's Hot Gospel chart and earned him a Dove Award in 2015. He has composed and produced music for artists including Killer Mike, Talib Kweli, the Game, and Royce da 5′9″.

He wrote, directed, and produced, the hip hop musical It's a Wonderful Plight, and wrote the book These Beats Ain't Free.

== Early life ==
Justin Rhodes was born in Oak Cliff, Texas, to parents Joe and Gloria Rhodes. He began writing lyrics and poetry while attending Carter High School. During his sophomore year at the University of North Texas, he began experimenting with beat machines and music production.

== Career ==
Rhodes’ music career began while he was in college. In 2007, he opened the 808 Studio in downtown Dallas where he was a producer and engineer. His song "Hello", which he produced and rapped on, was featured on MTV's RapFix Live in 2010. He won the IStandard ASCAP Producer Battle, that same year.

He is a Dove Music Award winner, and has composed and produced music for artists including Killer Mike, Lecrae, the Game, Slim Thug, Talib Kweli, Royce da 5′9″, and Styles P. Rhodes' music has been featured in television and films including The Recruit, America to Me, FreeRayshawn, Coffee & Kareem, Black and Blue, and Between the World and Me, and at the 2020 Democratic National Convention.

As a filmmaker, he produced and hosted the TV reality series for music producers The House of Beats, which aired on Apple TV in 2018. His music video "MakeItTakeIt" premiered at the American Black Film Festival in 2019. In 2020, Rhodes wrote, directed, and produced the hip hop musical It’s a Wonderful Plight, which received favorable reviews and was listed among USA Today's "The Summer Movies You Need to See" in 2021.

Rhodes authored These Beats Ain't Free, and has been a speaker and panelist at SXSW, ASCAP's I Create Music, and CD Baby's DIY music conference.

He is an associate professor at the Berklee College of Music.

== Selected discography ==
- 2023 – YES! – Killer Mike – composer, producer
- 2019 – S.P. the GOAT: Ghost of All Time – Styles P – producer
- 2018 – Dime Bag – Styles P – composer, producer
- 2017 – Chips – Talib Kweli (featuring Waka Flocka Flame) – composer
- 2016 – Tabernacle – Royce da 5′9″ – producer
- 2016 – Head Up Eyes Open – Talib Kweli (featuring Rick Ross and Yummy Bingham) – composer, producer
- 2014 – Welcome to America – Lecrae – composer, producer
- 2012 – Congregation – Talib Kweli & Z-Trip – producer
- 2012 – Blood Diamonds – The Game – composer, producer
