= Sideways (Zayn song) =

2026 single by Zayn

- Promotional graphic

Single by Zayn

from the album Konnakol
- Released: 27 March 2026
- Genre: Pop; R&B
- Length: 3:12
- Label: Mercury
- Songwriters: Zayn Malik; Jesse Shatkin; Stefan Johnson; Jordan K. Johnson; Oliver Peterhof; Mozella
- Producers: The Monsters & Strangerz; Shatkin; German

Zayn singles chronology
"Die for Me" (2025)	"Sideways" (2026)	"Heaven Baby" (2026)

Music video
- "Sideways" on YouTube

"Sideways" is a song by the English singer Zayn. It was released on 27 March 2026 through Mercury Records as the second single from his fifth studio album, Konnakol (2026). Zayn wrote the song with producers Jesse Shatkin, Stefan Johnson and Jordan K. Johnson of the Monsters & Strangerz, and Oliver Peterhof, along with Mozella.

== Composition ==
"Sideways" was written by Zayn himself, Jesse Shatkin, Stefan Johnson and Jordan K. Johnson of the Monsters & Strangerz, and Oliver Peterhof, along with Mozella. It was produced by all of them, minus the former and latter. Described as an "intimate R&Bnumber", the lyrics find Zayn reflecting on a relationship with a previous partner: "I miss lookin' at you sideways/ face-to-face with your lips on mine".

== Critical reception ==
Sam Williams of UDiscoverMusic described the track as a "an atmospheric pop R&B track that showcases the musician’s breathy falsetto". Bandwagon Asia wrote that Zayn does a good job "capturing the longing and desperation of missing some who used to be a constant in your life".

== Music video ==
The music video for "Sideways" premiered on 27 March 2026. Visually, the video sees Zayn lying sideways in a bed almost the entire time, depicting himself pretending to be looking at a potential lover.

== Personnel ==
Credits for "Sideways" adapted from digital liner notes.

=== Musicians ===
- Zayn – vocals
- Jesse Shatkin – drums, keyboards, programming, strings
- Jordan Johnson – drums, keyboards, programming, guitar, strings
- Stefan Johnson – drums, keyboards, programming, guitar, strings
- Oliver Peterhof – drums, keyboards, programming, guitar, strings
- Erick Serna – guitar

=== Production ===
- Jesse Shatkin – producer, engineer
- Stefan Johnson – producer, engineer
- Jordan Johnson – producer
- German – producer, engineer
- Bryce Bordone – engineer
- Stefan Johnson – engineer
- Brady Wortzel – additional engineer
- Samuel Dent – additional engineer
- Alex Ghenea – mixing
- Christian "C" Johnson – production coordination
- David "Dsilb" Silberstein – production coordination
- Jeremy "Jboogs" Levin – production coordination

== Charts ==
Weekly chart performance
Chart (2026)	Peak position
New Zealand Hot Singles (RMNZ)	30
Nigeria Airplay (TurnTable)	76
Suriname (Nationale Top 40)	13
UK British Asian (OCC)	1

== Release history ==
Release history
Region	Date	Formats	Label	Ref.
Various	27 March 2026	Digital download; streaming	Mercury	
Italy	2 April 2026	Radio airplay	Island	
