= Ex (Kiana Ledé song) =

Single by Kiana Ledé

from the EP Selfless and Myself
- Released: July 12, 2018
- Recorded: Late 2017–2018
- Genre: R&B
- Length: 3:42
- Label: Republic
- Songwriter(s): Cameron Lazar; Sofia Quinn; Chelsea Silon
- Producer(s): Cameron Hale; Lauren Elizabeth; Chelsea Lena

Kiana Ledé singles chronology
"Written in the Stars" (2018)	"Ex" (2018)	"Can I" (2019)

Music video
- "Ex" on YouTube

Remix cover
- Cover art of the official remix featuring Lil Baby.

"Ex" is a song by American singer Kiana Ledé, first released on July 12, 2018, from her EP Selfless (2018). It is considered her breakout single and also appears on her EP Myself (2019).

== Background and content ==
Kiana Ledé first heard the song on her iPhone, after someone on her team had heard it. According to Ledé, it resonated with her because at the time she was going through a breakup and missed her partner, so he wanted to sing it. She said in an interview with Genius:

After I heard the song, I said, "I fucking love it," and literally got on the mic the same day and recorded it. We reworked a couple of the lyrics a little bit just so it suited me a little bit more and was a little more tailored to me.

In that interview, she also stated:

I think there's a certain sad sultriness that the song has that is really nice for girls or guys who are coming out of a relationship and they weren't necessarily finished with the person they were seeing. They still kinda miss them, but they're also on the like, "Ooh, I kinda have this little bit of freedom now and I'm riding with it and I feel good, but I'm also kinda sad." I think that's like the best emotion to feel when you're going through a breakup. It's like the weirdest time, but it's also kinda fun, and I think the song really brings that out, so I want people to feel that and be able to sing along to it and kind of sexy dance to it a little bit.

== Remixes ==
An official remix of the song was released on March 8, 2019. It keeps the original hook and verses and features American rapper Lil Baby, who details the hardships of a relationship as it ends. A second remix featuring American rapper French Montana was later released. This version contains a sample of "Can't You See" by Total featuring The Notorious B.I.G. On March 29, 2019, a three-track single consisting of the original song and both remixes was released.

== Charts ==
Chart (2018)	Peak position
US Bubbling Under Hot 100 (Billboard)	6
US Hot R&B/Hip-Hop Songs (Billboard)	44
US Rhythmic (Billboard)	10

== Certifications ==
Region	Certification	Certified units/sales
New Zealand (RMNZ)	Platinum	30,000^{‡}
United States (RIAA)	Platinum	1,000,000^{‡}
^{‡} Sales+streaming figures based on certification alone.
