= Anomaly (Lecrae album) =

Studio album by Lecrae
- Released: September 9, 2014
- Recorded: 2013–2014
- Studio: Atlanta, Georgia
- Genre: Christian hip-hop; conscious hip-hop
- Length: 57:55
- Label: Reach Records
- Producer: 808xElite; Ace Harris for PK ONEDAY; Alex Medina; Andy Mineo (post-prod.); Derek Minor; Dirty Rice; Gawvi; JAQUEBEATZ; Joseph Prielozny; J. Rhodes; Mashell; Nate "The BeatBreaker" Robinson; S1; Street Symphony; Vohnbeatz

Lecrae chronology
Church Clothes 2 (2013)	Anomaly (2014)	Church Clothes 3 (2016)

Singles from Anomaly
- 1. "Nuthin" Released: July 1, 2014; 2. "Fear" Released: July 22, 2014; 3. "All I Need Is You" Released: July 31, 2014; 4. "Messengers" Released: September 19, 2014

Anomaly is the seventh studio album by American Christian hip-hop artist Lecrae, released on September 9, 2014, through Reach Records. The album features appearances from Crystal Nicole, Kari Jobe, and For King & Country, along with label-mate Andy Mineo. Anomaly met with a positive critical reception, and the song "Nuthin", released for streaming as a single on July 1, 2014, was nominated for the 2014 BET Hip Hop Awards in the best Impact Track category. The album also fared well commercially, debuting at No. 1 on the Billboard 200 with over 88,000 copies sold. It also debuted at No. 1 on the Top Gospel Albums chart, marking the first time that any artist has ever topped both the 200 and Gospel charts. Anomaly won Rap/Hip Hop Album of the Year at the 2015 GMA Dove Awards, and Rap, Hip Hop Gospel CD of the Year at the 2015 Stellar Awards. Two songs earned a nomination for the 2015 Grammy Awards; "All I Need Is You" was nominated for Best Rap Performance, and "Messengers", featuring For King & Country, won Best Contemporary Christian Music Performance/Song.

== Background ==
Anomaly is the seventh studio album by Lecrae, and follows up his 2013 mix-tape Church Clothes 2 and 2012 studio album Gravity. Gravity debuted at No. 3 on the Billboard 200, selling over 72,000 copies during its first week, and won both Best Gospel Album at the 2013 Grammy Awards and Best Rap/Hip Hop Album at the 2013 Dove Awards. The commercial version of Church Clothes 2 debuted at No. 21 on the Billboard 200, selling over 15,000 copies, while the free version was downloaded over 150,000 times on Datpiff.com.

Lecrae revealed that he had considered collaborating with Kendrick Lamar, Kanye West, Elle Varner and Nipsey Hu$$le, but eventually decided to work on his own. He said "it feels like a first album because it's just me being me and giving my own perspective". Lecrae worked with several producers including Gawvi, Tyshane, Ace Harris and Alex Medina. He also worked with Symbolyc One (S1) and Track a Dot. He described the production as "not just simple beats, a couple singles have that going on, but for the most part, it's really intricate."

== Promotion ==
In May 2014, Reach Records held two limited pre-release listening sessions, one at Stonecrest Mall in Atlanta, Georgia and another at Strght and Nrrw in Jacksonville, Florida for the song "Nuthin'" from Lecrae's upcoming album, whose title then had not yet been revealed. On June 3, 2014, Lecrae announced the title of the album, Anomaly, as well as its release date, then set as August 2014. He said: "Conceptually, it’s about how I deviate from the norm just being a product of Hip-Hop, but yet staying true to who I am and what I’m about, even though the culture is going its own route. It's saying 'Man, I don't care. I'll be different'. Lecrae began a trending hashtag with the album's name, allowing people to express their own story and individuality, ending their short pieces with the hashtag "#Anomaly". The likes of Lakers' point guard Jeremy Lin and Oakland Raiders' defensive end Justin Tuck contributed to this growing social media campaign. Lecrae explained their involvement:

I just wanted to do something that was unique and incorporated everybody, so it wasn't so much about getting Steph Curry or Jeremy Lin involved, as much as it was about getting everybody involved and saying, 'How are you uniquely made? How are you an anomaly?'. There were a lot of great stories and they just helped to tell [the] story that we're all unique.

On June 20, Lecrae unveiled the artwork of the album, which shows the face of the rapper in 3D. In July, he tweeted that the album's release would be pushed back to September 9, and unveiled the track listing. On July 22, Lecrae released a video explaining the album's title.

== Concerts and touring ==
On September 18, 2014, Lecrae was a guest on NBC's The Tonight Show Starring Jimmy Fallon, and performed several times throughout the show with The Roots.

Lecrae launched the Anomaly tour in support of the album, accompanied by Andy Mineo and DJ Promote. Started on October 3, 2014, the tour ran through November 21, stopping at 30 cities throughout the United States. It included a stop in Phoenix, Arizona, at the annual charity concert Bubba's Bash, sponsored by golfer Bubba Watson, which featured, in addition to Lecrae and his tour roster, the artists Britt Nicole, Thi'sl, Fedel, and Judah Smith. The tour met with such success that three more stops were added before it concluded on November 21. In January 2015, Lecrae announced a second leg of the tour, which started that April.

== Reception ==
Professional ratings
Review scores
Source	Rating
AllMusic	4/5 stars
CCM Magazine	4/5 stars
Cross Rhythms	10/10 stars
Cuepoint (Expert Witness)	(3-star Honorable Mention)
HipHopDX	3.5/5
Indie Vision Music	5/5 stars
Jesus Freak Hideout	4/5 stars 3.5/5 stars
New Release Tuesday	4.5/5 stars
Rolling Stone	3.5/5 stars
XXL	L (3/5)

Critics viewed Anomaly very favorably. David Jeffries, writing for AllMusic, rated the album four stars out of five, concluding that "Crafty and smart man, Lecrae, and with Anomaly following a series of albums equally crafted and smart, he now enters the hallowed halls of the consistent with all his charisma intact."

Writing for Vibe, Juan Vidal positively reviewed the album: "On his newest offering, Anomaly, Lecrae sounds more aware than ever. Aware of his place and of the stories he's been charged to tell. Immediately, he establishes himself as an outsider who doesn't quite fit in anywhere, treading the thin grey line between the sacred and secular. Over heavy synths and sharp, cracking drums, he flexes with a newfound lyrical prowess. [...] Lecrae's fast-paced flow does the work of complementing many of the bursting choruses, which are bigger and more pronounced than they've been on any of his previous releases. And much can be said about his voice this time around, which he's learned to stretch and manipulate to great effect."

Rachel Chesbrough of XXL noted that Lecrae's "ability to tell a story is on point, his delivery never falters once, and his detailed wordplay, however literal, does acrobatics in terms of rhyme scheme. Anomaly may not entirely break out of its niche, but it’s objectively admirable, and his already established fan base will love it."

The Christian Post reporter Vincent Funaro wrote: "Lecrae certainly shows growth on this album lyrically and seems to have perfected the writing style he began with the original Church Clothes mixtape, moving away from Christian theology and closer to content that people from all walks of life can relate to. He seems comfortable in his new space and raps more as a person following Christ in this world, rather than a Christian rapper."

Christina Lee of Creative Loafing (Atlanta) described the album as "an underdog story". "Anomaly truly comes alive when Lecrae dives into specifics. [The album] makes Lecrae's journey to salvation seem wholly personal. Thanks to his passion, people are bound to keep rooting for him, no matter what their beliefs may be."

On behalf of New Release Tuesday, Dwayne Lacy wrote how Lecrae "continues to bring the 'heat' and grow as an artist."

Writing for Indie Vision Music, Anthony Peronto described how "Anomaly is filled with both the experimental and the emotional."

The Washington Post noted that "what makes Anomaly so well, anomalous, is its subject matter. Verses about abortion, freedom, fear, marriage — even the artist’s own experience with molestation — flow from Lecrae with alacrity and purpose." Deborah Jane of Music Is My Oxygen gave the album four out of five stars and commented that "This guy is fresh. Raw. Genuine. Phenomenal. He's currently battling for No. 1 on the Billboard 200 charts – and it's obvious why."

=== Accolades ===
Publication	List	Rank
AllMusic	Best of 2014: Favorite Rap and Hip Hop Albums	No order
Rolling Stone	40 Best Rap Albums of 2014	12

== Commercial performance ==
The album debuted at number one on the Billboard 200 chart, with first-week sales of over 88,000 copies in the United States, which earned Lecrae his first and only No. 1 album on the chart. Anomaly was the first album by any artist to top both the Billboard 200 and the Gospel Albums chart. Lecrae became the fifth artist following Chris Tomlin (2013), TobyMac (2012), LeAnn Rimes (1997) and Bob Carlisle (1997) to score a number one album on both the Christian Albums chart and the Billboard 200. Anomaly marks the sixth time that Lecrae topped the Gospel Albums chart and the fifth time he topped the Christian Albums chart. In its second week of sales, the album sold 27,000 copies, bringing the total to 115,000 copies sold. In its third week of sales, the album sold another 17,000 copies, bringing the total to 137,000 copies. By January 2015, the album had sold 240,000 copies. On August 26, 2016, Anomaly was certified Gold by the RIAA, for combined sales, streaming and track-sales equivalent of 500,000 units.

== Track listing ==
No.	Title	Writer(s)	Producer(s)	Length
1.	"Outsiders"	Lecrae Moore; Dustin Bowie; Kenneth Chris Mackey; Joseph Prielozny; Torrance Esmond	Dirty Rice; Joseph Prielozny; Street Symphony	4:47
2.	"Welcome to America"	L. Moore; Larry Griffin, Jr.; Justin Rhodes	S1; J. Rhodes	4:22
3.	"Say I Won't" (featuring Andy Mineo)	L. Moore; Andrew Mineo; Gabriel Azucena; Tyshane Thompson; Matt Massarro	808xElite; Gawvi; Andy Mineo (post-prod.)	3:35
4.	"Nuthin'"	L. Moore; Dimitri McDowell; G. Azucena; A. Mineo	Gawvi	4:05
5.	"Fear"	L. Moore; Natalie Sims.K. C. Mackey; J. Prielozny	Dirty Rice; Joseph Prielozny	5:24
6.	"Anomaly"	L. Moore; Nate Robinson; Chonita Gillespie	Nate "The BeatBreaker" Robinson	2:29
7.	"Timepiece"	L. Moore; Serge Gustave; Mashell Leroy	Mashell	3:53
8.	"Dirty Water"	L. Moore; Derek Johnson, Jr.	Derek Minor	3:13
9.	"Wish"	L. Moore; Caleb McCampbell; L. Griffin, Jr.; JaVohn Griffin; J. Prielozny	S1; Vohnbeatz; Joseph Prielozny (post-prod.)	3:45
10.	"Runners"	L. Moore; Lasanna "Ace" Harris; G. Azucena	Gawvi; Ace Harris for PK ONEDAY	3:04
11.	"All I Need Is You"	L. Moore; D. Bowie; Tasha Catour; K. C. Mackey; J. Prielozny	Dirty Rice; Joseph Prielozny	3:44
12.	"Give In" (featuring Crystal Nicole)	L. Moore; Crystal Johnson; G. Azucena; Alex Medina	Gawvi; Alex Medina	3:47
13.	"Good, Bad, Ugly"	L. Moore; Kasey Sims; Jhaun Downer	JAQUEBEATZ	3:28
14.	"Broken" (featuring Kari Jobe)	L. Moore; Kari Jobe; K. C. Mackey; J. Prielozny	Dirty Rice; Joseph Prielozny	4:43
15.	"Messengers" (featuring For King & Country)	L. Moore; Joel Smallbone; Luke Smallbone; Ran Jackson; Ricky Jackson; K. C. Mackey; J. Prielozny; T. Esmond	Dirty Rice; Joseph Prielozny; Street Symphony	3:36

As a result of reaching No. 1 on the Billboard 200, the label released a thank-you track to fans. "Non-Fiction" was released as a digital download, and traces Lecrae's career.

=== Additional credits ===
- "Outsiders" contains uncredited vocals performed by Dustin "DAB" Bowie; background vocals are performed by Joseph Proelozny & Danika Hawkins.
- "Welcome to America" contains background vocals performed by S1; skit vocals are performed by Dusty Scott; additional keys by Epikh Pro.
- "Nuthin'" contains uncredited vocals are performed by Dimitri McDowell.
- "Fear" contains uncredited vocals are performed by Natalie Lauren; background vocals are performed by Danika Hawkins & Dirty Rice; skit vocals are performed by Nhadyne Brown, Geraloine Macauley & Uzuki Kakinuma.
- "Anomaly" contains uncredited vocals performed by N'dambi.
- "Wish" contains uncredited vocals performed by Caleb Sean.
- "Runners" contains skit vocals performed by Nekiyah Nunley.
- "All I Need Is You" contains uncredited vocals by J. Paul; background vocals are performed by Dustin "DAB" Bowie, Dirty Rice & Tasha Catour.
- "Good, Bad, Ugly" contains uncredited vocals performed by Kasey Rashel.

== Awards ==
Anomaly won Rap/Hip Hop Album of the Year at the 2015 GMA Dove Awards, and Rap, Hip Hop Gospel CD of the Year at the 2015 Stellar Awards. The song "Messengers", featuring For King & Country, won Best Contemporary Christian Music Performance/Song at the 2015 Grammy Awards, and was nominated for Rock/Contemporary Song of the Year at the 2015 GMA Dove Awards. "All I Need Is You" was nominated for Best Rap Performance at the 2015 Grammy Awards, and won Rap/Hip-Hop Song of the Year at the 2015 GMA Dove Awards. "Nuthin'" was nominated for BET Award for Best Impact Track at the 2014 BET Hip Hop Awards.

== Charts ==
=== Weekly charts ===
Chart (2014)	Peak position
Canadian Albums (Billboard)	16
New Zealand Albums Chart	34
UK Christian & Gospel Albums (OCC)	1
UK Independent Albums (OCC)	37
UK R&B Albums (OCC)	19
US Billboard 200	1
US Top Christian Albums (Billboard)	1
US Top Gospel Albums (Billboard)	1
US Independent Albums (Billboard)	1
US Top Rap Albums (Billboard)	1
US Indie Store Album Sales (Billboard)	2

=== Year-end charts ===
Chart (2014)	Position
US Billboard 200	98
US Top Christian Albums (Billboard)	3
US Top Gospel Albums (Billboard)	1

Chart (2015)	Position
US Top Christian Albums (Billboard)	5

== Certifications ==
Region	Certification	Certified units/sales
United States (RIAA)	Gold	500,000^{‡}
^{‡} Sales+streaming figures based on certification alone.
