= Room Under the Stairs =

Studio album by Zayn
- Released: 17 May 2024
- Recorded: 2018–2024
- Studios: Record Plant (Los Angeles); Low Country (Savannah); Red & Black (Pennsylvania); Georgia Mae (Savannah); Room Under the Stairs (Pennsylvania); RCA Studio A (Nashville); Orlando (Los Angeles); Electric Lady (New York City); Deer House (Glendale); The Green House (Los Angeles); Yucca (Los Angeles)
- Genres: Soft rock; soul; country
- Length: 49:05
- Labels: Drop Zed; Mercury
- Producers: Zayn; Carter Lang; Dave Cobb; German; Gian Stone; James Ghaleb; Rodaidh McDonald

Zayn chronology
| Nobody Is Listening (2021) | Room Under the Stairs (2024) | Konnakol (2026) |

Singles from Room Under the Stairs
- 1. "What I Am" Released: 15 March 2024; 2. "Alienated" Released: 12 April 2024; 3. "Stardust" Released: 17 May 2024

Room Under the Stairs is the fourth studio album by English singer-songwriter Zayn. It was released through Drop Zed Music and Mercury Records on 17 May 2024. Production was primarily handled by Zayn and Dave Cobb, alongside Gian Stone, James Ghaleb, Carter Lang, Rodaidh McDonald, German, and Kareen Loomax. The "Z Sides" version of the album was released three days later, which includes five additional tracks with two of them being demos. Serving as the follow-up to Zayn's previous album, Nobody Is Listening (2021), it is his first album not to feature any guest appearances.

The album was supported by three singles: "What I Am", "Alienated", and "Stardust". To promote the album, Zayn embarked on the Stairway to the Sky Tour from November 2024 to March 2025. The album received generally favourable reviews from music critics, debuting at number three on the UK Albums Chart and number fifteen on the US Billboard 200.

== Background ==
In July 2023, Zayn was interviewed by Alexandra Cooper of Call Her Daddy, where he revealed that he was recording a new album and spoke about some of its content and sound: "I'm doing a record I don't think people are really gonna expect... And it's got...like real-life experiences and stuff... [like] My daughter". On 28 February 2024, American record producer Dave Cobb revealed that he was working with Zayn on the then-upcoming album in an interview with Rolling Stone, in which he said: "You can hear love, loss, pain, triumph and humanity in [his voice]... Zayn has really created his own universe on this record, he...has no fear and is speaking straight from his soul". Exactly a week later, in a teaser video, Zayn said: "The intention... fully is for the listener to get more insight on me...as a human being". The cover art for Room Under the Stairs was considered to be a representation of Zayn's change in sound, with a simple illustration of a room under a staircase superimposed on his silhouette.

== Conception and influence ==
"I think the intention behind this album fully is for the listener to get more insight on me personally as a human being... my ambitions, my fears, and for them to have a connection with that and that's why it's so raw. It's just me. There's just me writing this, I didn't want anyone else to be in between me and the music, and the music and the people listening to it."

— Zayn via social media

In an interview with Rolling Stone, Zayn stated that listening to Chris Stapleton and Willie Nelson inspired the songwriting for this album, marking a shift away from the pop and R&B-centered styles of his first three albums towards "a more rustic and soulful sound". According to Clash, Room Under the Stairs is a "true coming-of-age story... where he draws on genres such as soul, country, and pop, and his lyrical sincerity and renewed creative freedom have taken his music in an exciting and interesting direction that no one saw coming."

== Composition ==
=== Music ===
The album includes "soulful" vocals on "Grateful", "Alienated" and "My Woman". Other tracks like "Stardust" was called an emotional and deep "country pop ode". "Gates of Hell" was considered to be an indie rock track with "soft rock Americana" and "an odd American twang" to Zayn's vocals appearing later in the track. "What I Am" was called soft pop and "False Starts" was noted for its "long falsettos". "Fuchsia Sea" was described as a "confused combination of soft rock and R&B".

"This is my favourite album that I've made to date, mainly because it comes from a place of sheer honesty and vulnerability, I wanted each song to feel as if it was just me sitting beside you telling you how I feel, singing directly to you. It's raw and stripped back and the type of music I always hoped to make. Working with Dave Cobb has been an amazing experience. The way he's elevated the music is second to none, and he has done an incredible job helping me create this record. I hope we can take listeners on some whimsical, magical journey, and that they enjoy listening to it as much as I enjoyed making it."

"I think just being where I was at that time, staying away from things and living with my own thoughts inspired me to want to write something from that place. I've got to put this out as a whole body of work, it's something for myself, not even just for the world."

— Zayn via Rolling Stone

== Release and promotion ==
Zayn announced the album along with its cover art and release date on 13 March 2024. He released a 45-second teaser video exactly a week before and made the album available for pre-order. "What I Am" was released on 15 March 2024 as the lead single for the album, it was accompanied by a lyric video. "Alienated", the second single for the album was released with an accompanying live performance on 12 April 2024. "Stardust" was the third single of the album, which was accompanied with a music video that was released the same day of the album.

On May 1, 2024, Zayn announced his first-ever solo live show at the O2 Shepherd's Bush Empire on May 17 in celebration of the release of the album. On 18 September 2024, Zayn announced he would embark on the Stairway to the Sky Tour. Spanning 21 shows and 11 cities, it kicked off on 23 November, 2024, in Leeds, England, and concluded on 27 March, 2025, in Mexico City, Mexico. Following Liam Payne's death, the United States dates were postponed to early 2025.

== Critical reception ==
Professional ratings
Aggregate scores
| Source | Rating |
|---|---|
| AnyDecentMusic? | 6.3/10 |
| Metacritic | 69/100 |
Review scores
| Source | Rating |
| AllMusic | 4/5 stars |
| Clash | 7/10 |
| The Daily Telegraph | 3/5 stars |
| DIY | 3/5 stars |
| Dork | 4/5 stars |
| The Guardian | 3/5 stars |
| MusicOMH | 3/5 stars |
| Pitchfork | 5.8/10 |
| The Line of Best Fit | 7/10 |
| Rolling Stone UK | 4/5 stars |

The album received a score of 69 out of 100 on review aggregator Metacritic based on ten reviews, which the website categorised as "generally favourable" reception. Neil Z. Yeung of AllMusic commented that "more than a reductive Zayn goes country" album, the beautiful Room Under the Stairs is the sound of an artist trying something brave and new, tapping into his soul and coming out on the other side with the strongest album of his career to date." Shannon Garner of Clash stated that it "is a revealing meditation of his journey in life where he lays his thoughts and feelings bare and the songs are built on a relaxing energy". She followed, "it also finds him exploring the hard notion of healing and self-discovery whilst remaining true to himself and that's something his fans should be proud of." The Daily Telegraph stated that the album shows "Malik's voice washes over you in slow, sensual waves, backed by instrumentals that sound more at home in dingy dive bars than brightly-lit stadiums." Dan Harrison of Dork called the record a "poignant reminder that sometimes losing one's way is the first step toward being truly found. It's a courageous, creative statement from an artist who has emerged from the crucible of personal evolution battle-scarred yet unbroken, with a clarity of voice and purpose as bracing as it is beautiful." Michael Cragg of The Guardian expressed that the "album is another unexpected manoeuvre. Eschewing his pop R&B sound, it focuses on rustic acoustic guitars, tinkling keys and the patter of live drums". He also stated that "it's a record that further cements Malik as an intriguing outlier." Sophia Simon-Bashall of The Line of Best Fit praised the album, stating that "they're Zayn's stories but they're shared in such an honest, straightforward yet compelling manner that they feel like your own." The album was listed on entertainment website Culture Fix as one of their best albums of 2024, noting: "Zayn Malik reached new creative highs with his artistically vibrant Room Under the Stairs" and adding that the album "impresses thanks to its rustic grooves, intimate vulnerability, and battle-scarred production."

== Commercial performance ==
Room Under the Stairs debuted at number three on the UK Albums Chart. Internationally, the album debuted at number nine in Germany and the Netherlands, and number sixteen in Australia. In the United States, the album entered the top 20 on the Billboard 200, ranked at number fifteen. Additionally, for the first time, Zayn appeared on the Top Rock & Alternative Albums chart, debuting at number five, and at number five on the Americana/Folk Albums chart. The album sold 29,000 equivalent album units in the US in its first week.

== Track listing ==
All tracks are written by Zayn Malik and Daniel Zaidenstadt, except where noted. All tracks are produced by Zayn and Dave Cobb, except where noted, with all songs from the "Z Sides" deluxe edition only being produced by Zayn.

Room Under the Stairs track listing
| No. | Title | Writer(s) | Producer(s) | Length |
|---|---|---|---|---|
| 1. | "Dreamin" | | | 3:32 |
| 2. | "What I Am" | | | 3:31 |
| 3. | "Grateful" | | | 3:22 |
| 4. | "Alienated" | | | 4:07 |
| 5. | "My Woman" | | | 3:42 |
| 6. | "How It Feels" | | | 2:59 |
| 7. | "Stardust" | Gian Stone, James Ghaleb, Sean Douglas, Casey Smith | Cobb, Stone, Ghaleb | 3:52 |
| 8. | "Gates of Hell" | | | 2:39 |
| 9. | "Birds on a Cloud" | | | 3:12 |
| 10. | "Concrete Kisses" | | | 3:45 |
| 11. | "False Starts" | Carter Lang, Rodaidh McDonald, Daniel Wilson | Lang, McDonald | 3:28 |
| 12. | "The Time" | | | 3:13 |
| 13. | "Something in the Water" | Malik, Oliver Peterhof, Kareen Lomax, Francisca Hall, Conor Blake | Cobb, German, Lomax^{[a]} | 2:31 |
| 14. | "Shoot at Will" | | | 2:37 |
| 15. | "Fuchsia Sea" | | | 2:28 |
| Total length: | | | | 49:05 |

"Z Sides" Deluxe Edition
| No. | Title | Length |
|---|---|---|
| 16. | "Ignorance Ain't Bliss" (Demo) | 3:19 |
| 17. | "Lied To" | 2:46 |
| 18. | "In the Bag" | 3:52 |
| 19. | "Gave" | 3:04 |
| 20. | "Alienated" (Demo) | 4:27 |
| Total length: | | 60:06 |

Note

- ^{^[a]} signifies an additional producer

== Personnel ==
Credits adapted from the album's liner notes.

Musicians

- Zayn – lead vocals
- Philip Towns – keyboards (1–10, 12–15), snaps (4, 10)
- Derrek Phillips – drums (1–10, 12–15), percussion (1, 4, 5, 7–10), snaps (4)
- Brian Allen – bass (1–6, 8–10, 12–15)
- Dave Cobb – electric guitar (1, 3–6, 9, 10, 13, 15), acoustic guitar (4, 8, 10, 12, 14, 15), snaps (4), guitar (7), percussion (8)
- Logan Todd – percussion (5)
- Gian Stone – drums, percussion, programming, guitar (7)
- James Alan – bass, guitar (7)
- Rodaidh McDonald – guitar, synthesizers, percussion, programming (11)
- Carter Lang – guitar, synthesizer, bass, drums (11)
- German – drums, keyboards, programming (13)
- Kareen Lomex – guitar (13)

Technical and visuals

- Daniel Zaidenstadt – engineering (all tracks), production supervision (1–6, 8–10, 12, 14, 15)
- Greg Koller – engineering (1–4, 6–15), mixing (1–6, 8–15)
- Darrell Thorp – engineering (5)
- Oliver "German" Peterhof – engineering (13)
- Ethan Barrette – second engineering (1–4, 6–10, 12–15)
- Phillip Smith – second engineering (5)
- Jeremie Inhaber – mixing (7)
- Pete Lyman – mastering
- Daniel Bacigalupi – mastering assistance
- Andrew Brightman – production coordination (1–10, 12–15)
- Eric Caudieux – editing (5, 6, 13, 14)
- Drew Gleason – creative direction
- Kristen Sorace – design
- Daniel Prakopcyk – photography
- Sebastián Faena – photography
- Pedro Molizane – illustration

== Charts ==
Weekly chart performance for Room Under the Stairs
| Chart (2024) | Peak position |
|---|---|
| Australian Albums (ARIA) | 16 |
| Austrian Albums (Ö3 Austria) | 25 |
| Belgian Albums (Ultratop Flanders) | 15 |
| Belgian Albums (Ultratop Wallonia) | 43 |
| Dutch Albums (Album Top 100) | 9 |
| German Albums (Offizielle Top 100) | 9 |
| Irish Albums (Official Charts) | 26 |
| Italian Albums (FIMI) | 38 |
| New Zealand Albums (RMNZ) | 38 |
| Polish Albums (ZPAV) | 25 |
| Portuguese Albums (AFP) | 98 |
| Scottish Albums (Official Charts) | 2 |
| Spanish Albums (Promusicae) | 17 |
| Swiss Albums (Schweizer Hitparade) | 31 |
| UK Albums (Official Charts) | 3 |
| UK Independent Albums (Official Charts) | 7 |
| US Billboard 200 | 15 |
| US Americana/Folk Albums (Billboard) | 5 |
| US Top Rock & Alternative Albums (Billboard) | 5 |

== Release history ==
Release history and formats for Room Under the Stairs
| Region | Date | Format(s) | Version | Label | Ref. |
|---|---|---|---|---|---|
| Various | 17 May 2024 | Digital download; streaming; CD; vinyl; cassette | Standard | Drop Zed; Mercury | |
| United States | 18 May 2024 | Digital download | Z Sides | Drop Zed; Mercury | |
| Various | 20 May 2024 | Streaming | Z Sides | Drop Zed; Mercury | |
