= Konnakol (album) =

2026 studio album by Zayn

- Standard edition cover

Studio album by Zayn
- Released: 17 April 2026
- Recorded: 2025
- Genres: Pop; R&B
- Length: 45:27
- Label: Mercury
- Producers: German; Nick Hahn; Malay; Zayn Malik; Connor McDonough; Riley McDonough; the Monsters & Strangerz; Jesse Shatkin; Isaiah Tejada; Victor Thell

Zayn chronology
Room Under the Stairs (2024)	Konnakol (2026)

Singles from Konnakol
- 1. "Die for Me" Released: 6 February 2026; 2. "Sideways" Released: 27 March 2026

Konnakol is the fifth studio album by the English singer Zayn. It was released on 17 April 2026 through Mercury Records. It serves as the follow-up to Zayn's previous album, Room Under the Stairs (2024), and was preceded by the singles "Die for Me" and "Sideways". The album's title is named after konnakol, the art of performing percussion syllables vocally in South Indian Carnatic music. To promote the album, Zayn embarked on the Konnakol Tour, scheduled from May to October 2026.

== Background ==
On 15 September 2025, Zayn hosted a Twitch livestream, during which he revealed to have been working on a new album. In January 2026, he went on a seven-show residency at the Dolby Live at Park MGM in Las Vegas, Nevada, in which he announced he was working on a new album and performed five then-unreleased songs: "Nusrat", "Used to the Blues", "Fatal", "Take Turns" and "Die for Me". The album's cover art was initially teased during the residency at different shows.

== Release and promotion ==
On 4 February 2026, Zayn announced the album along with its cover art and release date.

The album's lead single, "Die for Me", was released on 6 February 2026. "Sideways" was released as the album's second single on 27 March 2026. A digital deluxe edition of the album was released on 21 April 2026.

Zayn stated that the album was "the derivative of a lot of inspiration from [his] Indian heritage and culture" in his second appearance on Call Her Daddy.

In support of the album, Zayn embarked on the Konnakol Tour. Produced by Live Nation, it commenced on 23 May 2026 in London, England, and concluded on 14 October 2026 in Lima, Peru.

== Critical reception ==
Professional ratings
Aggregate scores
Source	Rating
AnyDecentMusic?	7.2/10
Metacritic	69/100
Review scores
Source	Rating
AllMusic	3.5/5 stars
The Arts Desk	4/5 stars
Beats Per Minute	76%
Clash	7/10
The Irish Times	3/5 stars
Pitchfork	5.9/10

According to the review aggregator Metacritic, Konnakol received "generally favorable reviews" based on a weighted average score of 69 out of 100 from four critic scores. The review aggregator AnyDecentMusic? gave the album a weighted average score of 7.2 out of 10 from six critic scores.

Mary Chiney of Beats Per Minute rated the album 76%, saying: "Throughout Konnakol, Malik explores an in-between space: a space of memory and reality where the past is constantly being re-negotiated". Robin Murray of Clash called the album "a potent return", and that "it's a record that finds Zayn at ease in his own skin, producing work that feels honest, and frequently inspired". Mark Kidel from The Arts Desk wrote in his four-star review: "This is an album that thrives on enough exploration and variety, for the experience to feel refreshing rather than over-produced".

In a mixed review for Pitchfork, Sameer Rao stated that "expecting Konnakol to break the pattern of underwhelming, moody R&B-pop albums, or to make Zayn as interesting as he's tried to signal he is for over a decade, will disappoint anyone not already committed to loving him". Neil Z. Yeung of AllMusic wrote that "Malik's reliable vocals and the top production quality deliver the goods, but here's hoping the restrained ideas on Konnakol yield a more liberated approach next time around". In a three-star review for The Irish Times, Ed Power pointed out the wasted potentials throughout the entire record and stated that it "has aspirations to artsiness but lacks the means to fully articulate them".

== Commercial performance ==
In the United Kingdom, Konnakol debuted at number four on the UK Albums Chart. Internationally, the album entered top ten in several countries, including Austria, Belgium, Netherlands, Germany and Scotland. In the United States, Konnakol entered the top 20 on the Billboard 200, ranking at number eighteen. Additionally, the album also debuted at fifteen at the ARIA Charts in Australia.

== Track listing ==
Standard edition
No.	Title	Writer(s)	Producer(s)	Length
1.	"Nusrat"	Zayn Malik; Malay; Mikky Ekko	Malik; Malay	2:19
2.	"Betting Folk"	Malik; Malay; Ekko	Malik; Malay	2:42
3.	"Used to the Blues"	Malik; Malay; Ekko	Malik; Malay	3:08
4.	"Sideways"	Malik; Jesse Shatkin; Stefan Johnson; Jordan K. Johnson; Oliver Peterhof; Mozella	The Monsters & Strangerz; Shatkin; German	3:12
5.	"5th Element"	Malik; Malay; Ekko; Ricardo Reglero; Mauricio Reglero	Malik; Malay	2:59
6.	"Prayers"	Malik; Malay; Ekko	Malik; Malay	3:28
7.	"Side Effects"	Malik; Ryan Daly; Riley McDonough; Connor McDonough; Castle; Ryan Wheeler	Daly; R. McDonough; C. McDonough	3:17
8.	"Met Tonight"	Malik; Isaiah Tejada; S. Johnson; Jordan Orvosh; Daniel Zaidenstadt	Malik; the Monsters & Strangerz; Tejada	2:51
9.	"Fatal"	Malik; Malay; Ekko; R. Reglero; M. Reglero	Malik; Malay	3:26
10.	"Take Turns"	Malik; Malay; Ekko	Malik; Malay	3:26
11.	"Blooming"	Malik; Malay; Tayla Parx	Malik; Malay	2:20
12.	"Like I Have You"	Malik; Malay; Ekko; JP Saxe; Trey Campbell	Malik; Malay	2:44
13.	"Loving the Way I Do"	Malik; Malay; Ekko	Malik; Malay	3:09
14.	"Breathe"	Malik; Malay; Ekko	Malik; Malay	3:20
15.	"Die for Me"	Victor Thell; Nick Hahn; Tejada; J. Johnson; S. Johnson; Linnea Södahl; James Essien	Thell; Hahn; the Monsters & Strangerz; Tejada	3:00
Total length:				45:27

Deluxe edition track listing
No.	Title	Writer(s)	Producer(s)	Length
16.	"Bad for You"	Malik	Malik; Daniel Zaidenstadt	3:09
17.	"Daydreamin'"	Malik	Malik; Henrique Andrade; Sam Ricci	2:58
18.	"Raise the Dead"	Malik	Malik; Zaidenstadt	2:38
Total length:				54:12

== Personnel ==
The credits are adapted from Tidal.

=== Musicians ===
- Zayn Malik – lead vocals
- Malay – bass, guitar, keyboards, programming (tracks 1–3, 5, 6, 9–14)
- Dave Eggar – string arrangement, strings, bass, cello (2, 14)
- Phil Faconti – strings (2, 14)
- Rocco Greco – violin, viola (2, 14)
- Jordan K. Johnson – drums, keyboards, programming (4, 8, 15); guitar, strings (4)
- Stefan Johnson – drums, keyboards, programming (4, 8, 15); guitar, strings (4)
- Oliver Peterhof – drums, guitar, keyboards, programming, strings (4)
- Jesse Shatkin – drums, keyboards, programming, strings (4)
- Erick Serna – guitar (4)
- Connor McDonough – bass, drums, guitar, programming, strings, synthesizer (7)
- Riley McDonough – bass, drums, guitar, programming, strings, synthesizer (7)
- Ryan Daly – bass, drums, guitar, programming, strings, synthesizer (7)
- Isaiah Tejada – drums, keyboards, programming (8, 15); guitar (15)
- JordanXL – guitar (8)
- Nick Hahn – bass, drums, guitar, keyboards, percussion, programming (15)
- Victor Thell – bass, drums, guitar, keyboards, percussion, programming (15)
- Nico Aranda – guitar (15)

=== Technical ===
- Malay – engineering (1–3, 5, 6, 9–14)
- Bryce Bordone – engineering (1, 7, 8, 14, 15)
- Stefan Johnson – engineering (4, 8, 15)
- German – engineering (4)
- Jesse Shatkin – engineering (4)
- Connor McDonough – engineering (7)
- Riley McDonough – engineering (7)
- Ryan Daly – engineering (7)
- Nick Hahn – engineering (15)
- Victor Thell – engineering (15)
- Brady Wortzel – additional engineering (4, 8, 15)
- Samuel Dent – additional engineering (4)
- Serban Ghenea – mixing (1, 7, 8, 14, 15)
- Alex Ghenea – mixing (2–6, 9–14)
- Jack Normile – additional mixing (2–6, 9–14)
- Randy Merrill – mastering (15)
- Christian "C" Johnson – production coordination (4, 8, 15)
- David "Dsilb" Silberstein – production coordination (4, 8, 15)
- Jeremy "Jboogs" Levin – production coordination (4, 8, 15)
- Anders Johansson – production coordination (15)
- Jon Allen – production coordination (15)
- Paul Harris – production coordination (15)

== Charts ==
Chart performance
Chart (2026)	Peak position
Australian Albums (ARIA)	15
Austrian Albums (Ö3 Austria)	9
Belgian Albums (Ultratop Flanders)	2
Belgian Albums (Ultratop Wallonia)	9
Dutch Albums (Album Top 100)	7
French Albums (SNEP)	61
German Albums (Offizielle Top 100)	5
German Pop Albums (Offizielle Top 100)	3
Irish Albums (Official Charts)	38
Italian Albums (FIMI)	47
New Zealand Albums (RMNZ)	19
Polish Albums (ZPAV)	21
Portuguese Albums (AFP)	82
Scottish Albums (Official Charts)	3
Spanish Albums (Promusicae)	26
Swiss Albums (Schweizer Hitparade)	37
UK Albums (Official Charts)	4
US Billboard 200	18

== Release history ==
Release history
Region	Date	Format(s)	Edition	Label	Ref.
Various	17 April 2026	CD; digital download; streaming; vinyl	Standard	Mercury	
United States	21 April 2026	Digital download; streaming	Deluxe	Mercury	
Various	22 May 2026	Digital download; streaming	Deluxe	Mercury	
