= Nobody Is Listening =

Studio album by Zayn
- Released: 15 January 2021
- Studios: Major Tom's (London); Germano, the Mastering Place (New York City)
- Genres: Pop; R&B
- Length: 35:43
- Label: RCA
- Producers: Zayn; Charlie Handsome; David Harris; Ernest; Henrique Andrade; Jacob Durrett; Jay Kurzweil; Nicky Davey; Philip von Boch Scully; Red Buttonz; Roger Kleinman; Rogét Chahayed; Saltwives; Scribz Riley; Symphony; Unicorn Waves; Zachary Seman

Zayn chronology
Icarus Falls (2018)	Nobody Is Listening (2021)	Room Under the Stairs (2024)

Singles from Nobody Is Listening
- 1. "Better" Released: 25 September 2020; 2. "Vibez" Released: 8 January 2021

Nobody Is Listening is the third studio album by the English singer Zayn. It was released on 15 January 2021 through RCA Records, which is his last album under the label. The album features guest appearances from Syd and Devlin. It follows his previous album, Icarus Falls, which was released in late 2018. The album was preceded by the release of the singles "Better" and "Vibez". Upon release, Nobody Is Listening received generally favorable reviews from critics; the album peaked at number forty-four on the US Billboard 200 and number seventeen on the UK Albums Chart.

== Background ==
The album's artwork is designed by Zayn himself and is inspired by expressionism and graffiti. The cover was revealed on his website along with the CD pre-order on 8 January 2021.

The album was supported by the singles "Better" and "Vibez". The album contains eleven tracks including the two singles. Zayn said to have "total creative rein" on the project, as well as "making the music he has always wanted to". In an interview with Entertainment Daily, Zayn described the album as his "most personal project to date".

== Critical reception ==
Professional ratings
Aggregate scores
Source	Rating
AnyDecentMusic?	5.7/10
Metacritic	63/100
Review scores
Source	Rating
AllMusic	3.5/5 stars
Clash	7/10
The Daily Telegraph	2/5 stars
Evening Standard	3/5 stars
The Guardian	3/5 stars
The Independent	2/5 stars
The Irish Times	3/5 stars
NME	3/5 stars
Pitchfork	5.6/10
Rolling Stone	3.5/5 stars

The album holds an aggregate score of 63 out of 100 on Metacritic based on nine reviews, indicating "generally favorable reviews".

Dhruva Balram of NME wrote that the album "has its flaws" and that it "doesn’t add many new colours to his palette" but complimented it for being "wrenchingly intimate and sweetly playful" and "quietly purposeful pop" and that it is "a step in a new and fresh direction for the enigmatic artist". Writing for Rolling Stone, Brittany Spanos felt that Malik "found his sweet spot" with the record, naming "Tightrope" and "River Road" as "two of Malik's best songs to date". Jem Aswad of Variety named the album "concise and to the point" and felt that it "clears the table for whatever might be coming next". Malvika Padin of Clash felt that the record "indicates that he’s achieved some sort of clarity on the direction he wants to take as a solo artist" although she felt that it had "minimal production and few moments of experimentation" that "only offers negligible glimpses into Zayn’s personality".

Kitty Empire of The Guardian felt that Malik sounds "freer than ever before" while naming his voice "assuredly elastic", feeling that "the songs suit him more and more" and that he "keeps refining"; she felt the record as a whole was an improvement over Icarus Falls. Writing for AllMusic, Neil Yeung felt that the album was "a logical turn" and "moving closer toward heartfelt love songs instead of exaggerated playboy fantasies" while naming it his "most mature album to date." Craig Jenkins of Vulture wrote that Malik's "solo career still makes no sense, yet the intrigue remains earned" while calling him "a stronger man for his efforts, however seemingly minimal," ending his review by opining that his "way to write songs that leans into the strength of his voice and speaks coolly and quietly to the ups and downs of a high-profile romance will suffice." Sheldon Pearce of The New Yorker opined that "his music has often felt a bit forced" but felt that "he finally taps into something more natural: sophisticated, largely atmospheric pop that simmers like quiet-storm R&B."

In a less positive review, Alexandra Pollard of The Independent opined the album as "a blancmange of watered-down R&B" and felt that it lacked personality. She went on to write that "the lyrics feel insultingly half-arsed" and that he "doesn't do it [his voice] justice here". Kate Solomon of The Daily Telegraph felt the album lacked personality while writing that "he has nothing mature to say" and "fails to make the most of his talents". Writing for The Evening Standard, David Smyth felt that the record included "largely hazy, stoned R&B, offering blurred textures and smoky atmospheres but few standout moments" and that he "may not be sustainable unless the music speaks a little louder"; he did, however, compliment Malik's voice, writing that it was "undoubtable that his vocal ability was wasted on One Direction’s primary-coloured pop." Louise Bruton of The Irish Times wrote that Malik "has now found his niche in lo-fi R&B-pop that’s intentionally made without any aim at all." Dani Blum, writing for Pitchfork, called the album a "low bar he congratulates himself for clearing—knowing that no matter what he sings, legions of fans will listen" and felt that "he’s never sounded like this much of an amateur" while naming the songs "blathering and diluted, a derivation of a derivation. Writing for Renowned for Sound, Angus Whitfield felt that the album "might have had more weight, importance and potential relatability" if it had focused more on "his struggle with fame and mental health" as opposed to "love making and smoking weed." He complimented tracks like "Outside" and "When Love's Around" (calling Syd's feature "welcome and warming") but criticized "Vibez" as "boring and repetitive" and disliked Devlin's "aggressive rapping" in "Windowsill".

== Track listing ==
Nobody Is Listening track listing
No.	Title	Writer(s)	Producer(s)	Length
1.	"Calamity"	Zayn Malik	Zayn; Unicorn Waves	3:07
2.	"Better"	Malik; David Brown; Dustin Bowie; Michael McGregor; Cole Citrenbaum; Philip von Boch Scully	Scully; Citrenbaum^{[a]}	2:54
3.	"Outside"	Malik; Khalid Robinson; Ryan Vojtesak	Charlie Handsome	3:28
4.	"Vibez"	Malik; Rogét Chahayed; Michael Orabiyi; Nija Charles; Darnell Donohue	Chahayed; Scribz Riley	2:43
5.	"When Love's Around" (featuring Syd)	Malik; Sydney Bennett; Nicholas Eaholtz; Jay Oyebadejo; David Rosser	Nicky Davey; Jay Kurzweil^{[b]}	3:11
6.	"Connexion"	Malik; Talay Riley; Roger Kleinman; Zachary Seman	Kleinman; Seman	3:16
7.	"Sweat"	Malik; Alexander Oriet; David Phelan; Negin Djafari	Saltwives	3:52
8.	"Unfuckwitable"	Malik; Nikki Flores; Rickie Tice; Kimberly Krysiuk; Dan Henig; Rubén Hernandez; Samik Ganguly	Red Buttonz; Symphony	2:44
9.	"Windowsill" (featuring Devlin)	Malik; James Devlin; Natalie Dunn; Theodore Rubin; Oriet; Phelan	Saltwives	3:08
10.	"Tightrope"	Malik; Ernest Smith; David Harris; Jacob Durrett; Ravi Badayuni; Shakeel Badayuni	Ernest; Harris; Durrett	3:24
11.	"River Road"	Malik; Henrique Andrade	Zayn; Andrade	3:56
Total length:				35:43

=== Notes ===
- ^{^[a]} signifies an additional producer
- ^{^[b]} signifies a co-producer
- "Tightrope" interpolates "Chaudhvin Ka Chand Ho", written by Ravi Sharma and performed by Mohammed Rafi

== Personnel ==
Performers

- Philip von Buch Scully – guitar, percussion, programming (2)
- Nick Green – drum machine (5)
- Dave Rosser – guitar, synthesizer (5)
- Alex Oriet – drums, guitar, keyboards, programming (7, 9)
- David Phelan – drums, guitar, keyboards, programming (7, 9)
- David Ryan Harris – programming (10)

Technical

- Denis Kosiak – mixing
- Jon Castelli – mixing
- Dale Becker – mastering
- Josh Deguzman – engineering
- Nicky Davey – engineering (5)
- Alex Oriet – engineering (7, 9)
- David Phelan – engineering (7, 9)
- David Harris – engineering (10)
- Henrique Andrade – recording (2–5, 8, 10–11)
- Hector Vega – assistant engineering (2, 6)

== Charts ==
Chart performance for Nobody Is Listening
Chart (2021)	Peak position
Argentine Albums (CAPIF)	2
Australian Albums (ARIA)	10
Belgian Albums (Ultratop Flanders)	22
Belgian Albums (Ultratop Wallonia)	83
Canadian Albums (Billboard)	21
Dutch Albums (Album Top 100)	31
Finnish Albums (Suomen virallinen lista)	21
German Albums (Offizielle Top 100)	35
Irish Albums (Official Charts)	32
Italian Albums (FIMI)	8
Lithuanian Albums (AGATA)	5
New Zealand Albums (RMNZ)	31
Norwegian Albums (VG-lista)	22
Polish Albums (ZPAV)	5
Portuguese Albums (AFP)	1
Spanish Albums (Promusicae)	9
Swedish Albums (Sverigetopplistan)	20
Swiss Albums (Schweizer Hitparade)	17
Scottish Albums (Official Charts)	88
UK Albums (Official Charts)	17
US Billboard 200	44

== Release history ==
Release history and formats for Nobody Is Listening
Region	Date	Format(s)	Label	Ref.
Various	15 January 2021	CD; digital download; streaming	RCA	
