= Better (Zayn song) =

2020 single by Zayn

Single by Zayn

from the album Nobody Is Listening
- Released: 25 September 2020
- Length: 2:55
- Label: RCA
- Songwriters: ZAYN; David Brown; Dustin Bowie; Michael McGregor; Cole Citrenbaum; Philip von Boch Scully
- Producer: Scully

Zayn singles chronology
"Flames" (2019)	"Better" (2020)	"Vibez" (2021)

"Better" is a song by an English singer-songwriter Zayn. It was released on 25 September 2020 through RCA Records as the lead single from his third studio album, Nobody Is Listening (2021). He wrote the song with his producer, Philip von Boch Scully, alongside Lucky Daye, Dustin Bowie, Michael McGregor, and Cole Citrenbaum. The song marks his first and only release of the year.

== Commercial performance ==
"Better" has sold 200,000 units in the US as of 23 June, 2021.

== Release and promotion ==
On 23rd September 2020, Zayn revealed a glimpse of "Better" in a small teaser video which featured a small clip of the beginning of the official music video. On the following day, he revealed the song's artwork on Twitter.

== Music video ==
The music video for "Better' directed by Ryan Hope, was released on 25th of september 2020, coinciding with the song's debut.

== Charts ==
Chart performance for "Better"
Chart (2020)	Peak position
Billboard Global 200	47
Canada Hot 100 (Billboard)	59
Ireland (IRMA)	56
Malaysia (RIM)	11
Netherlands (Dutch Top 40 Tiparade)	18
New Zealand Hot Singles (RMNZ)	5
Portugal (AFP)	94
Sweden (Sverigetopplistan)	51
UK Singles (OCC)	58
US Billboard Hot 100	89
US Rolling Stone Top 100	69

== Certifications ==
Region	Certification	Certified units/sales
Brazil (Pro-Música Brasil)	Gold	20,000^{‡}
^{‡} Sales+streaming figures based on certification alone.
