= Vibez (Zayn song) =

2021 single by Zayn

Single by Zayn

from the album Nobody Is Listening
- Released: 8 January 2021
- Genre: R&B
- Length: 2:44
- Label: RCA
- Songwriters: Zayn Malik; Rogét Chahayed; Michael Orabiyi; Nija Charles; Darnell Donohue
- Producers: Chahayed; Scribz Riley

Zayn singles chronology
"Better" (2020)	"Vibez" (2021)	"To Begin Again" (2021)

Music video
- "Vibez" on YouTube

"Vibez" is a song by English singer-songwriter Zayn Malik. It was released on 8 January 2021 through RCA Records as the second and final single from his third studio album, Nobody Is Listening. Malik wrote the song with its producers, Rogét Chahayed and Scribz Riley, alongside Nija Charles and Darnell Donohue. The song marks his first release of the year and it was released only one week exactly before the album was released.

== Release and promotion ==
On 7 January 2021, Zayn teased "Vibez" on Twitter with a small video of an animated stage, with the word "TOMORROW" written on it.

== Music video ==
The official music video for "Vibez" premiered on 8 January 2021, only twelve hours after the song was released, and directed by Ben Mor.

== Composition ==
Musically, "Vibez" is a R&B song. The song is set in 4/4 common time and has a tempo of 97 beats per minute. It is written in the key of G major, and Zayn's vocals span from F♯_{3} to A_{4}.

== Charts ==
Chart (2021)	Peak position
Australia (ARIA)	70
Billboard Global 200	91
Canada Hot 100 (Billboard)	83
Colombia Anglo (Monitor Latino)	14
Greece (IFPI)	70
Guatemala Anglo (Monitor Latino)	4
Hungary (Single Top 40)	39
Ireland (IRMA)	31
Lithuania (AGATA)	48
Netherlands (Single Tip)	17
New Zealand Hot Singles (RMNZ)	9
Portugal (AFP)	143
Singapore (RIAS)	25
Sweden Heatseeker (Sverigetopplistan)	6
UK Singles (Official Charts)	50
US Bubbling Under Hot 100 (Billboard)	20
