= Kiana Ledé =

American singer and actress

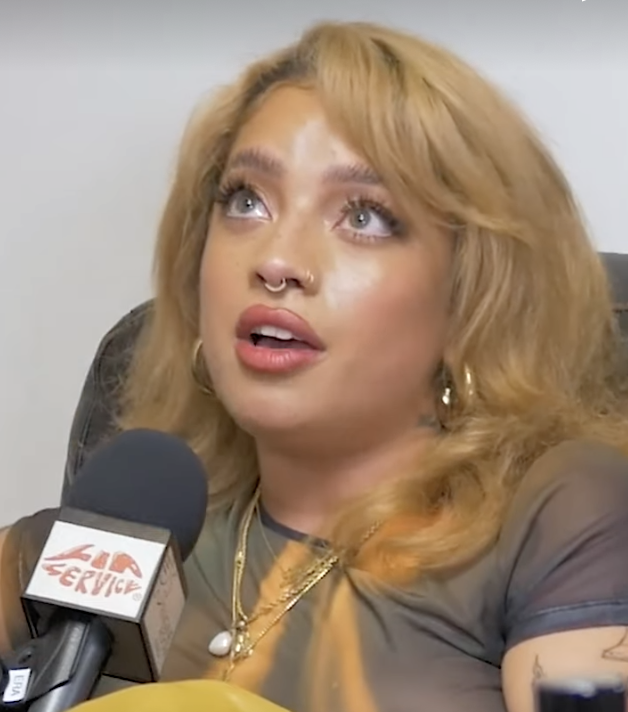
- Ledé in 2023

Background information
- Born: Kiana Ledé Brown; April 3, 1997 (age 29); Lemoore, California, U.S.
- Genres: R&B; pop
- Occupations: Singer; actress
- Years active: 2011–present
- Labels: 10 Summers; The Heavy Group; Republic; BMG
- Website: kianalede.com

Kiana Ledé Brown (born April 3, 1997) is an American singer and actress. She first starred as Zoe Vaughn on the second season of MTV's horror series Scream (2015–2019). She also starred as Veronica Washington on Netflix's original series All About the Washingtons. Brown began her recording career in 2012, releasing two extended plays (EPs) until singing with Republic Records to release her third EP, Selfless (2018). It spawned the single "Ex", which received platinum certification by the Recording Industry Association of America (RIAA). Her debut studio album, Kiki (2020), peaked at number 30 on the Billboard 200.

== Early life and education ==
Kiana Ledé Brown's father is of Black-American and Indigenous American descent, while her mother is a white Hispanic of Mexican-American descent. As an infant, she began to sing the alphabet immediately after learning it and began performing at the age of three upon receiving her first karaoke machine. As a child, she began to regularly perform in school plays and beauty pageants while studying the piano. She would regularly get kicked out of class for singing, prompting her mother to enroll her in a performing arts school so she could put her talent to good use. She attended Mountain Pointe High School.

== Career ==
In 2011, Ledé's mother discovered Kidz Bop, a website for kids to upload and share videos of themselves performing. She uploaded a video of Ledé performing an original number on the piano which was selected as a finalist. After performing Adele's "Someone Like You" to earn her a place in the Top 4, Ledé won the 2011 KIDZ Star USA Grand Prize out of 45,000 submissions, the largest national talent competition for kids ages 15 and under.

At a school assembly, Ledé was told that she won the national talent search by American Idol winner Kris Allen. The prize included a RCA Records recording contract and a starring role in the Kidz Bop 21 music video and commercial. Allen said after seeing her live, "she went from 'She's good' to 'She is no doubt gonna win this thing.'"

Ledé said she had the opportunity to listen to and select from her top three song choices. After considering and listening to the songs, she said she chose her first single "Hey Chica" because of the upbeat tempo. The song was released June 19, 2012. Brown has performed the song on The Today Show and at the 86th annual Macy's Thanksgiving Day Parade. She also performed "Do The Mermaid" from Barbie in A Mermaid Tale 2.

In 2012, Ledé was named cover girl for Miss Moxie's Holiday 2012 issue. The site praised "Hey Chica" for promoting a "clear message of self-empowerment and encourages young women to feel beautiful in their own skin".

At the age of 16, Ledé moved to Los Angeles. As artists do, she wanted more creative control of her music, so she showed the label what she was working on. They did not see potential in her work, and dropped her a month later. She started creating cover songs with production duo Rice N' Peas. The series was dubbed "Soulfood Sessions" and gained millions of views.

In 2016, Ledé was cast in the series regular role as Zoe Vaughn on the second season of MTV's Scream. In 2018, she also accepted a lead role alongside Joseph Simmons of Run-DMC in the Netflix original series All About The Washingtons. Despite the actress' raving reviews, the series was cancelled after only one season.

Following her departure from RCA Records, Ledé signed with Republic Records after her rendition of Drake's "Hotline Bling" helped gain their attention. She would later release her debut EP Selfless in July 2018. The EP includes her breakout single "Ex", which became her first entry to the Billboard charts, peaking at number 9 on the US R&B Songs charts. It has earned platinum status from the RIAA as of June 2020. To promote Selfless, she served as opening act with Ro James on Jessie J's R.O.S.E. Tour. She and Lucky Daye also opened up for the Ella Mai The Debut Tour in 2019.

Ledé's second studio EP, Myself, was released in June 2019, and included the single "Bouncin" featuring rapper Offset, which peaked within the top 30 of Billboard's rhythmic airplay chart. She would also embark on her first headlining tour that same year.

Standalone singles "Title" and "Easy Breezy" would build momentum for her debut album, which Ledé had been working on for some time. Her highly anticipated 17-track debut album, titled KIKI was released on April 3, 2020, which debuted at number 30 on the Billboard 200. The album features guest appearances from R&B stars Ari Lennox, 6LACK and more. The lead single "Mad at Me" interpolates Outkast's 2000 hit song "So Fresh, So Clean".

Ledé would later make a few guest appearances on tracks with Usher, Queen Naija and others. She released the deluxe edition of KIKI on October 23, including seven bonus tracks. In 2021, she was featured on the first all-female compilation album, Big Femme Energy Volume 1, with her track "Cut 'Em Off".

On January 7, 2023, Ledé released a mixtape on SoundCloud titled Unfinished. She released her second studio album, Grudges, on June 16, 2023. She also announced a headlining tour, The Grudges Tour, which took place in September and October 2023.

She released her third studio album, Cut Ties, on November 1st, 2024 after departing Republic Records.

== Personal life ==
Ledé identifies as queer. She has bipolar disorder.

== Filmography ==
Film roles of Kiana Ledé
Year	Title	Role	Notes
2006	Deadlands: The Rising	Evacuee / Zombie	
2018	Next Gen	Greenwood (voice)	
2025	Sneaks	Shawna (voice)	

TV roles of Kiana Ledé
Year	Title	Role	Notes
2006	Temporary Dreams	Herself	Evelyn Worku
2015	Guidance	Riley	Episodes: "The Pictures", "The Secrets"
2015–2016	Betch	Various characters / Herself	3 episodes
2016	Scream	Zoe Vaughn	Main role (season 2); 11 episodes
2018	All About the Washingtons	Veronica Washington	Main role; 10 episodes

== Discography ==
=== Studio albums ===
List of albums, with selected chart positions
Title	Album details	Peak chart positions
Title	Album details	US
Kiki	Release date: April 3, 2020; Label: The Heavy Group, Republic; Formats: CD, vinyl, streaming, digital download	30
Grudges	Release date: June 16, 2023; Label: The Heavy Group, Republic; Formats: CD, vinyl, streaming, digital download	30
Cut Ties	Release date: November 1, 2024; Label: 10 Summers, Kiana Ledé Entertainment, Inc., BMG; Formats: streaming, digital download	—

=== Extended plays ===
List of extended plays, with details
Title	Details
Soulfood Sessions	Released: December 15, 2015; Label: Orange Factory Music; Format: Digital download
Christmas by Ledé	Released: December 12, 2016; Label: Orange Factory Music; Format: Digital download
Selfless	Released: July 12, 2018; Label: Republic; Format: Digital download
Myself	Released: June 7, 2019; Label: The Heavy Group/Republic; Format: Digital download

=== Singles ===
==== As lead artist ====
List of singles as lead artist, with selected chart positions and certifications, showing year released and album name
Title	Year	Peak chart positions				Certifications	Album
Title	Year	US Bub.	US R&B /HH	US R&B	NZ Hot	Certifications	Album
"Hey Chica"	2012	—	—	—	—		Non-album singles
"Home for Christmas"	2016	—	—	—	—		Non-album singles
"I Choose You" (featuring Pell)	2017	—	—	—	—		Non-album singles
"One of Them Days"	2017	—	—	—	—		Non-album singles
"Fairplay" (solo or featuring ASAP Ferg)	2017	—	—	—	—		Selfless
"Ex"	2019	6	44	9	—	RIAA: Platinum; RMNZ: Platinum	Selfless & Myself
"Can I"	2019	—	—	—	—		Myself
"Bouncin" (featuring Offset)	2019	—	—	—	—	RMNZ: Gold	Myself
"Title"	2019	—	—	—	—		Non-album singles
"Easy Breezy"	2019	—	—	—	—		Non-album singles
"Mad at Me"	2020	—	—	—	18		Kiki
"Forfeit" (featuring Lucky Daye)	2020	—	—	—	—		Kiki
"Chocolate" (featuring Ari Lennox)	2020	—	—	—	28		Kiki
"Only Fan" (featuring Jacquees)	2020	—	—	—	—		Kiki
"Ur Best Friend" (featuring Kehlani)	2021	—	—	14	27		Non-album single
"Irresponsible"	2022	—	—	—	—		Grudges
"Jealous" (featuring Ella Mai)	2023	—	—	—	33		Grudges
"Deeper"	2023	—	—	—	—		Grudges
"Natural"	2024	—	—	—	—		Cut Ties
"Space and Pussy"	2024	—	—	—	—		Cut Ties
"—" denotes a recording that did not chart or was not released in that territory.

==== As featured artist ====
List of singles as lead artist, with selected chart positions and certifications, showing year released and album name
Title	Year	Peak chart positions	Certifications	Album
Title	Year	NZ	Certifications	Album
"Bruised Not Broken" (Matoma featuring MNEK and Kiana Ledé)	2019	—		Non-album singles
"Mama" (Ella Eyre and Banx & Ranx featuring Kiana Ledé)	2019	—		Non-album singles
"I'm Her" (Queen Naija featuring Kiana Ledé)	2020	—		missunderstood
"Not My Neighbour" (Niko Walters featuring Kiana Ledé)	2021	4	RMNZ: 2× Platinum	Non-album singles
"Just Fine" (Kitty Ca$h featuring Kiana Ledé)	2021	—		Non-album singles
"—" denotes a recording that did not chart or was not released in that territory.

=== Promotional singles ===
List of promotional singles, showing year released and album name
Title	Year	Album
"Do the Mermaid"	2012	Barbie in A Mermaid Tale 2
"Big Spender" (featuring Prince Charlez)	2018	Fifty Shades Freed (Original Motion Picture Soundtrack)
"A Little More" (G-Eazy featuring Kiana Ledé)	2021	Non-album single
"Who Do You Think You Are" (with Cautious Clay)	2022	From The Netflix Film The School for Good and Evil

=== Other charted songs ===
List of singles as lead artist, with selected chart positions, showing year released and album name
Title	Year	Peak chart positions	Album
Title	Year	NZ Hot	Album
"All to You" (Russ featuring Kiana Ledé)	2020	38	Shake the Snow Globe

=== Other appearances ===
List of promotional singles, showing year released and album name
Title	Year	Other artist(s)	Album
"Touch Me"	2015	VenessaMichaels	Non-album single
"Running to the Sky"	2018	Daveed Diggs	Blindspotting: The Collin EP
"Undercover"	2018	Ljay Currie	Free (EP)
"Clutch"	2020	Col3trane	Non-album single
"In Too Deep"	2020	Jacob Collier	Djesse Vol. 3
"This Day"	2020	Usher	Jingle Jangle: A Christmas Journey – Soundtrack
"Stuck in the Middle, Pt. II"	2020	Tai Verdes	Non-album single
