= Die for Me (Zayn song) =

2026 single by Zayn

Single by Zayn

from the album Konnakol
- Released: 6 February 2026
- Genre: R&B; pop
- Length: 3:00
- Label: Mercury
- Songwriters: Victor Thell; Nick Hahn; Isaiah Tejada; Jordan Johnson; Stefan Johnson; Linnea Södahl; James Essien
- Producers: Thell; Hahn; Tejada; the Monsters & Strangerz

Zayn singles chronology
"Eyes Closed" (2025)	"Die for Me" (2026)	"Sideways" (2026)

Music video
- "Die for Me" on YouTube

"Die for Me" is a song by the English singer Zayn. It was released on 6 February 2026 through Mercury Records as the lead single from his fifth studio album, Konnakol (2026). Written by Victor Thell, Nick Hahn, Isaiah Tejada, Jordan Johnson and Stefan Johnson, Linnea Södahl and James Essien, the track is described as R&B. The song also features production work from American songwriting team the Monsters & Strangerz.

== Background ==
Zayn debuted "Die for Me" on 20 January 2026, during a concert at Park MGM in Paradise, Nevada. Along with that song, he also performed four other tracks, "Nusrat", "Used to the Blues", "Fatal" and "Take Turns" from his upcoming fifth album, Konnakol. It was released on 6 February 2026, and was serviced for radio airplay in Italy on 12 February.

== Composition ==
"Die for Me" was written by Victor Thell, Nick Hahn, Isaiah Tejada, Jordan Johnson, Stefan Johnson, Linnea Södahl and James Essien. It was produced by Thell, Hahn, Tejada, and the Monsters & Strangerz. Described as an "R&B-pop single," the lyrics find Zayn longing for a lover to stay with him in his times of need: "You said you would die for me / Don't leave me now when I need you the most."

== Critical reception ==
Shahzaib Hussain of Clash described the track as a "heartbreak melodrama," comparing it to The Weeknd's "Earned It" for its "fusion of chamber pop and the churchy passion of classic RnB." The Indiependent wrote, "ZAYN is able to depart from the conventional pop formula, but he maintains his distinctive sound by combining them with the 'angelic' falsetto and fluid vocal runs that have come to define him. Though more focused and 'pop-forward' than his most recent indie-folk experiments, it feels more experimental than his earlier work."

== Music video ==
The music video for "Die for Me" premiered on 6 February 2026. It was directed by Frank Borin and Ivanna Borin. Visually, the video sees Zayn "stranded in a dystopian-type world."

== Personnel ==
Credits for "Die for Me" adapted from digital liner notes.

=== Musicians ===
- Zayn – vocals
- Victor Thell – bass, drums, guitar, keyboards, percussion, programming
- Nick Hahn – bass, drums, guitar, keyboards, percussion, programming
- Isaiah Tejada – drums, guitar, keyboards, programming
- Jordan Johnson – drums, keyboards, programming
- Stefan Johnson – drums, keyboards, programming
- Nico Aranda – guitar

=== Production ===
- Victor Thell – producer, engineer
- Nick Hahn – producer, engineer
- The Monsters & Strangerz – producer
- Isaiah Tejada – producer
- Bryce Bordone – engineer
- Stefan Johnson – engineer
- Brady Wortzel – additional engineer
- Serban Ghenea – mixing
- John Hanes – immersive mixing engineer
- Randy Merrill – mastering

== Charts ==
=== Weekly charts ===
Weekly chart performance
Chart (2026)	Peak position
Belarus Airplay (TopHit)	2
Bulgaria Airplay (PROPHON)	6
Canada CHR/Top 40 (Billboard)	37
CIS Airplay (TopHit)	10
Croatia International Airplay (Top lista)	37
Czech Republic Airplay (ČNS IFPI)	5
Finland Airplay (Radiosoittolista)	31
Guatemala Anglo Airplay (Monitor Latino)	10
Israel TV Airplay (Media Forest)	4
Israel International TV Airplay (Media Forest)	1
Kazakhstan Airplay (TopHit)	16
Lithuania Airplay (TopHit)	51
Moldova Airplay (TopHit)	12
New Zealand Hot Singles (RMNZ)	17
Nigeria Bubbling Under Hot 100 (TurnTable)	12
North Macedonia Airplay (Radiomonitor)	7
Russia Airplay (TopHit)	7
Ukraine Airplay (TopHit)	92
UK Singles (Official Charts)	91
UK British Asian (OCC)	1

=== Monthly charts ===
Monthly chart performance
Chart (2026)	Peak position
Belarus Airplay (TopHit)	2
CIS Airplay (TopHit)	10
Kazakhstan Airplay (TopHit)	30
Lithuania Airplay (TopHit)	93
Moldova Airplay (TopHit)	30
Russia Airplay (TopHit)	10
Ukraine Airplay (TopHit)	94

== Release history ==
Release history
Region	Date	Formats	Label	Ref.
Various	6 February 2026	Digital download; streaming	Mercury	
Italy	12 February 2026	Radio airplay	Island	
