= Alienated (song) =

2024 single by Zayn

Single by Zayn

from the album Room Under the Stairs
- Released: 12 April 2024
- Genre: Soul blues
- Length: 4:07
- Label: Mercury; Republic
- Songwriters: Zayn Malik; Daniel Zaidenstadt
- Producers: Zayn; Dave Cobb

Zayn singles chronology
"What I Am" (2024)	"Alienated" (2024)	"Stardust" (2024)

Live performance
- "Alienated" on YouTube

"Alienated" is a song by English singer-songwriter Zayn. It was released on 12 April 2024 through Mercury and Republic Records as the second single from his fourth studio album, Room Under the Stairs. Zayn wrote the song with Daniel Zaidenstadt and produced it alongside American record producer Dave Cobb.

== Background ==
According to Zayn, via X, "'Alienated' was the first song I wrote for the album, so it kind of set the tone for the whole project - it shaped the way I wanted to approach the sound of my own voice, the styling of the guitars and the overall sonic direction." He revealed on social media that he wrote the song six years ago. The idea first came up while Zayn was living in Philadelphia when he "wanted to write something that was a little bit more elevated, and a little bit more insightful than the music that I'd been putting out at that point." He also stated that it was his favourite off the album as it "comes from a place of sheer honesty and vulnerability."

== Composition ==
"Alienated" was written by Zayn and produced it with Dave Cobb. The track strays away from Zayn's early R&B sound and focuses on a more soulful sound inspired by artists such as Chris Stapleton and Willie Nelson. Speaking about the sound, he stated "you can't really put them in a genre," as he noted that the song was "influenced by other music." He described it as his version of blues.

== Live performance ==
On 12 April 2024, Zayn uploaded a live performance video of the song onto his YouTube channel, which marks his first live performance since 2016.

== Charts ==
Chart performance for "Alienated"
Chart (2024)	Peak position
New Zealand Hot Singles (RMNZ)	26
UK Asian Music (OCC)	1
UK Singles Downloads (OCC)	57
UK Singles Sales (OCC)	60
UK British Asian Chart (OCC)	1

== Release history ==
Release history and formats for "Alienated"
Region	Date	Format(s)	Label	Ref.
Various	12 April 2024	Digital download; streaming	Mercury; Republic	
