= What I Am (Zayn song) =

2024 single by Zayn

Single by Zayn

from the album Room Under the Stairs
- Released: 15 March 2024
- Genre: Adult contemporary; soft rock
- Length: 3:31
- Label: Mercury; Republic
- Songwriter: Zayn Malik
- Producers: Zayn; Dave Cobb

Zayn singles chronology
"Tu Hai Kahan" (2024)	"What I Am" (2024)	"Alienated" (2024)

Lyric video
- "What I Am" on YouTube

"What I Am" is a song by English singer-songwriter Zayn. It was released on 15 March 2024 through Mercury and Republic Records as the lead single from his fourth studio album, Room Under the Stairs. Zayn wrote the song by himself and produced it alongside American record producer Dave Cobb.

== Composition ==
"What I Am" is a song that sees Zayn venture into the adult contemporary genre, which includes a stripped-back instrumental, while it sees him depart from the sound of his previous music. Lyrically, he gets candid as he speaks about accepting himself for the way he is and requests the same acceptance from others while also describing a toxic relationship. On the chorus, he sings: "Don't take me for what I'm sayin' / Just take me for what I am / 'Cause this is where I'm stayin' / My two feet are in the sand".

== Promotion ==
Through a handwritten note that he posted on social media the day of its release, he said that "this song is the first release of a special project I've been working on for years". Eight days before the release of the song, Zayn announced it along with its release date and a short snippet of it before briefly appearing on The Tonight Show Starring Jimmy Fallon six days after that to share another snippet.

== Chart performance ==
"What I Am" debuted at number 89 on the UK Singles Chart, becoming his second-lowest charting single in the country as a solo artist since "Entertainer", which peaked at number 95. The song also peaked at number one on the UK Asian Music chart. The song reached number six on the New Zealand Hot Singles chart.

== Charts ==
Chart performance for "What I Am"
Chart (2024)	Peak position
Netherlands (Dutch Top 40 Tiparade)	29
New Zealand Hot Singles (RMNZ)	6
UK Singles (OCC)	89
UK Asian Music (OCC)	1
UK British Asian Chart (OCC)	3

== Release history ==
"What I Am" release history
Region	Date	Format(s)	Label(s)	Ref.
Various	15 March 2024	Digital download; streaming	Mercury; Republic	
Italy	15 March 2024	Radio airplay	Universal	
