= Andrew Reich =

American producer and screenwriter

Andrew Reich is an American producer and screenwriter. He was an executive producer for the last three seasons of the American sitcom television series Friends, alongside Scott Silveri, Shana Goldberg-Meehan and Ted Cohen. Reich created the television series Work It with Ted Cohen. He also won a Primetime Emmy Award and was nominated for three more in the category Outstanding Comedy Series.
